= List of Question Time episodes =

The following is a list of episodes of Question Time, a British current affairs debate television programme broadcast by BBC Television.

Contents

Year overview · Presenters · Highest appearance makers

Year: 1979 · 1980 · 1981 · 1982 · 1983 · 1984 · 1985 · 1986 · 1987 · 1988 · 1989
1990 · 1991 · 1992 · 1993 · 1994 · 1995 · 1996 · 1997 · 1998 · 1999
2000 · 2001 · 2002 · 2003 · 2004 · 2005 · 2006 · 2007 · 2008 · 2009
2010 · 2011 · 2012 · 2013 · 2014 · 2015 · 2016 · 2017 · 2018 · 2019
2020 · 2021 · 2022 · 2023 · 2024 · 2025 · 2026 ·

Notes · References · External links

== Year overview ==
Year	Episodes	Transmission dates
1979	13 (Note: Note Genome lists 14 episodes but Election Question Time aired 4 May 1979 is not considered part of the series.)	25 September – 18 December
1980	32	15 January – 18 December
1981	31	15 January – 17 December
1982	31	14 January – 16 December
1983	32 (Note: Note Genome only lists 29 episode due to Radio Times Printing dispute.)	13 January – 15 December
1984	35	12 January – 20 December
1985	29	10 January – 12 December
1986	35	9 January – 11 December
1987	33	15 January – 10 December
1988	35	7 January – 15 December
1989	37	12 January – 14 December
1990	34	18 January – 13 December
1991	35	10 January – 5 December
1992	33	23 January – 10 December
1993	34	14 January – 9 December
1994	35	13 January – 15 December
1995	32	12 January – 14 December
1996	33	11 January – 19 December
1997	33	23 January – 18 December
1998	33 (Note: Note Genome only lists 32 episodes due to 16 April 1998 being unscheduled.)	15 January – 17 December
1999	37 (Note: Note Genome only lists 36 episodes due to 15 July 1999 being unscheduled.)	14 January – 16 December
2000	36	13 January – 14 December
2001	38 (Note: Note Genome only lists 37 episodes due to 13 September 2001 being unscheduled.)	11 January – 6 December
2002	37 (Note: Note Genome only lists 36 episodes due to 28 March 2002 being unscheduled.)	10 January −12 December
2003	35	9 January – 11 December
2004	37	8 January – 9 December
2005	35	6 January – 8 December
2006	36	12 January – 7 December
2007	37	11 January – 13 December
2008	36	17 January – 11 December
2009	37	15 January – 10 December
2010	40	14 January – 9 December
2011	39	13 January – 8 December
2012	36	12 January – 13 December
2013	38	10 January – 12 December
2014	36	9 January – 11 December
2015	41	8 January – 17 December
2016	39	14 January – 8 December
2017	41	12 January – 14 December
2018	39	11 January – 13 December
2019	42	10 January – 13 December
2020	37	9 January – 10 December
2021	39	6 January – 16 December
2022	37	13 January – 15 December
2023	37	12 January – 14 December
2024	39	11 January – 12 December
2025	33	16 January – 11 December
2026	to be determined	22 January – to be determined

== Presenters ==
Presenters	Date	No. of episodes
Robin Day	1979–1989	303
Robert McKenzie	1980–1981	3
Ludovic Kennedy	1982–1983	4
Bernard Levin	1984–1985	2
Sue Lawley	1984–1987	5
Donald MacCormick	1985	9
Peter Sissons	1989–1993	149
David Dimbleby	1994–2018	914
John Humphrys	2009	1
Nick Robinson	2017	1
Fiona Bruce	2019–	
Victoria Derbyshire	2022	1

== Highest appearance makers ==
Panellists	Affiliation	No. of appearances	Average per year	Date
Kenneth Clarke	Conservatives	60	1.4	1982–2025
Shirley Williams	Labour (before 1981); Social Democrats (1981–88); Liberal Democrats (1988–2021)	58	1.7	1980–2015
Menzies Campbell	Liberal Democrats	47	1.6	1987–2017
Harriet Harman	Labour	45	1.3	1981–2015
Charles Kennedy	Liberal Democrats	44	1.4	1983–2015
Nigel Farage	Conservatives (until 1992); UKIP (1993–2018); Brexit Party / Reform UK (2019–present)	38	1.9	2000–2024
Michael Heseltine	Conservatives	38	1.1	1979–2015
Clare Short	Labour	38	1.2	1980–2011
Paddy Ashdown	Liberal Democrats	36	1.1	1983–2016
Roy Hattersley	Labour	36	1.2	1979–2010

== Episode guide ==
=== 1979 ===
#	No. in year	Airdate	Location	Panellists	Notes
—	—	4 May 1979		Robin Day, Robert McKenzie, David Butler	Election Question Time
1	1	25 September 1979	London	Michael Foot, Teddy Taylor, Edna O'Brien, Derek Worlock	
2	2	2 October 1979	London	Tess Gill, Jo Grimond, Eric Morley, Peter Shore	
3	3	9 October 1979	London	Sue Arnold, Michael Heseltine, William Rodgers, Arthur Scargill	
4	4	16 October 1979	London	James Anderton, Judith Hart, John Mortimer, Enoch Powell	
5	5	23 October 1979	London	Anthony Frodsham, Clive Jenkins, Margo MacDonald, Nicholas Scott	
6	6	30 October 1979	London	Roy Hattersley, Elspeth Howe, Emily Macfarquhar, Ray Whitney	
7	7	6 November 1979	London	Julian Amery, Paul Johnson, Wendy Mantle, Sid Weighell	
8	8	13 November 1979	London	Clement Freud, Ann Leslie, David Owen, Peter Thorneycroft	
9	9	20 November 1979	London	Rachel Billington, Barbara Castle, Monty Finniston, William Waldegrave	
10	10	27 November 1979	London	Janet Fookes, Robert Kilroy-Silk, William Rees-Mogg, Barbara Wootton	
11	11	4 December 1979	London	Eldon Griffiths, Conor Cruise O'Brien, Gaia Servadio, Eric Varley	
12	12	11 December 1979	London	George Brown, Clare Francis, Joan Lestor, Christopher Mayhew	
13	13	18 December 1979	London	Neil Kinnock, Bel Mooney, Chris Patten, John Rae	

=== 1980 ===
#	No. in year	Airdate	Location	Panellists	Notes
14	1	15 January 1980		Tony Benn, Germaine Greer, John Hackett, Norman St. John Stevas	
15	2	22 January 1980		Tessa Jowell, William Rees-Mogg, William Waldegrave, Barbara Wootton	
16	3	29 January 1980		Noel Annan, Kenneth Baker, Denis Healey, Sara Morrison	
17	4	5 February 1980		Edward du Cann, Monty Finniston, Suzanne Lowry, Oonagh McDonald	
18	5	12 February 1980		Alun Chalfont, Nigel Lawson, Merlyn Rees, Marina Warner	
19	6	21 February 1980		David Basnett, Barbara Castle, Detta O'Cathain, Peter Tapsell	
20	7	28 February 1980		Anna Coote, Janet Fookes, Gerald Kaufman, Cyril Smith	
21	8	6 March 1980		Eric Heffer, Mary Kenny, David Marquand, Geoffrey Rippon	
22	9	13 March 1980		Rhodes Boyson, Austin Mitchell, Alfred Robens, Clare Short	Presenter: Robert McKenzie
23	10	20 March 1980		John Gale, Jill Knight, Michael Meacher, Donald Stokes	Presenter: Robert McKenzie
24	11	27 March 1980		Joel Barnett, John Biffen, Alan Fisher, Sarah Hogg	
25	12	3 April 1980		Bonnie Angelo, Julian Critchley, Lena Jeger, Trevor Phillips	
26	13	10 April 1980		Jock Bruce-Gardyne, Ray Buckton, Margaret Maden, John Methuen	
27	14	17 April 1980		Elisabeth Hoodless, R.V. Jones, Sheila Roberts, John Silkin	
28	15	24 April 1980		Liliana Archibald, Tessa Blackstone, Nicholas Fairbairn, Dickson Mabon	
29	16	1 May 1980		Joe Ashton, John Biggs-Davison, Emma Nicholson, Ivor Richard	
30	17	8 May 1980		Alan Beith, John Grugeon, Stan Orme, Claire Palley	
31	18	15 May 1980		Hugh Clegg, Reg Prentice, Jo Richardson, Angela Rumbold	
32	19	22 May 1980		Leon Brittan, Paul Foot, Walter Goldsmith, Shirley Williams	
33	20	29 May 1980		Patricia Hewitt, Robert Mellish, Timothy Raison, David Sheppard	
34	21	5 June 1980		Patrick Devlin, Patricia Hollis, Harold Lever, Janet Young	
35	22	12 June 1980		Ann Clwyd, James Goldsmith, Sally Oppenheim-Barnes, Bill Sirs	
36	23	16 October 1980		David Basnett, Patricia Hewitt, Daphne Park, Jim Prior	
37	24	23 October 1980		Roy Hattersley, Una Kroll, Nigel Lawson, Arnold Weinstock	
38	25	30 October 1980		Denis Healey, Mary Kaldor, Conor Cruise O'Brien, Peter Thorneycroft	
39	26	6 November 1980		Mary Baker, Leonard Downie, Francis Pym, Peter Shore	
40	27	13 November 1980		Liliana Brisby, Eric Heffer, Ann Leslie, Norman St John Stevas	
41	28	20 November 1980		Michael Carver, Judith Hart, Gavin Laird, Angus Maude	
42	29	27 November 1980		John Alderson, Dianne Hayter, Roy Shaw, Teddy Taylor	
43	30	4 December 1980		Tessa Blackstone, Lynda Chalker, Joe Gormley, John Harvey-Jones	
44	31	11 December 1980		David Howell, Peter Jay, Neil Kinnock, Gillian Peele	
45	32	18 December 1980		Stanley Booth-Clibborn, Edward du Cann, Antonia Fraser, Shirley Williams	

=== 1981 ===
#	No. in year	Airdate	Location	Panellists	Notes
46	1	15 January 1981		Barbara Castle, Peter Parker, Cyril Smith, William Whitelaw	
47	2	22 January 1981		Terence Beckett, Tom Jackson, Sally Oppenheim-Barnes, John Silkin	
48	3	29 January 1981		Frances Morrell, David Owen, David Steel, Peter Walker	
49	4	5 February 1981		Gwyneth Dunwoody, Eldon Griffiths, Clive Jenkins, David Napley	
50	5	12 February 1981	London	Edward Daly, Edna Healey, Max Beloff, Norman St John-Stevas	
51	6	26 February 1981		Rhodes Boyson, Donald Dewar, Alex Jarratt, Nancy Seear	
52	7	5 March 1981		Monty Finniston, Barney Hayhoe, Terry Marsland, Jack Straw	
53	8	12 March 1981		Geoffrey Howe, Detta O'Cathain, Stanley Orme, David Penhaligon	
54	9	19 March 1981		Peggy Fenner, Merlyn Rees, William Rees-Mogg, Arthur Scargill	
55	10	26 March 1981		Nicky Harrison, Douglas Hurd, Gerald Kaufman, Dick Taverne	
56	11	2 April 1981		Moss Evans, Jo Grimond, Susan Masham, Norman Tebbit	Presenter: Robert McKenzie
57	12	9 April 1981		Nigel Broackes, Harriet Harman, Roy Hattersley, Michael Heseltine	
58	13	16 April 1981		Terry Duffy, Sarah Hogg, Paul Johnson, Hugh Montefiore	
59	14	23 April 1981		Janey Buchan, John Pardoe, Leo Pliatzky, Geoffrey Rippon	
60	15	30 April 1981		Nicholas Fairbairn, Roy Jenkins, Bel Mooney, Peter Shore	
61	16	7 May 1981		Ralf Dahrendorf, Ken Gill, Helene Hayman, Peter Thorneycroft	
62	17	14 May 1981		Nicholas Goodison, Ian Mikardo, Jane Reed, George Younger	
63	18	21 May 1981		Frank Field, Grey Gowrie, Miriam Karlin, Sara Morrison	
64	19	28 May 1981		Leon Brittan, Eric Heffer, Mary Holland, Enoch Powell	
65	20	4 June 1981		Lynda Chalker, Paul Foot, Denis Healey, Peter Hill-Norton	
66	21	11 June 1981		David Evans, Neil Kinnock, Usha Prashar, Timothy Raison	
67	22	18 June 1981		David Howell, Michael Meacher, Janet Morgan, Woodrow Wyatt	
68	23	22 October 1981		Leon Brittan, Kay Carmichael, Jo Grimond, Denis Healey	
69	24	29 October 1981		Judith Hart, Douglas Hurd, Ann Leslie, William Rodgers	
70	25	5 November 1981		Roy Hattersley, Nigel Lawson, Alan Sapper, Elizabeth Sidney	
71	26	12 November 1981		Robin Cook, Ian Gilmore, Detta O'Cathain, Jane Reed	
72	27	19 November 1981		Paul Boateng, Ronald Dworkin, Anne Jones, William Whitelaw	
73	28	26 November 1981	Liverpool	Jock Bruce-Gardyne, Eric Heffer, Roy Jenkins, Clare Short	
74	29	3 December 1981		Naomi McIntosh, Sally Oppenheim-Barnes, Adam Thomson, George Wright	
75	30	10 December 1981		Gerry Fitt, Joan Lestor, Emily Macfarquhar, Francis Pym	
76	31	17 December 1981		Edward du Cann, Antonia Fraser, Harold Lever, Bernard Levin	

=== 1982 ===
#	No. in year	Airdate	Location	Panellists	Notes
77	1	14 January 1982		Neil Kinnock, Marion Roe, John Thorn, Shirley Williams	
78	2	21 January 1982		Terence Duffy, Tess Gill, Patrick Jenkin, Margaret Shaw	
79	3	28 January 1982		Gerald Kaufman, Geoffrey Rippon, Barbara Switzer, Julie Tallon	
80	4	4 February 1982		Alec Kitson, Isobel Lindsay, David Penhaligon, Malcolm Rifkind	
81	5	11 February 1982		Joe Haines, Frances Morrell, Cyril Smith, Janet Young	
82	6	18 February 1982		Oonagh McDonald, David Owen, Norman Tebbit, Sidney Weighell	
83	7	25 February 1982		David Aaronovitch, Christopher Chataway, Brenda Dean, William Waldegrave	
84	8	4 March 1982		Bonnie Angelo, Anna Coote, Grey Gowrie, Peter Shore	
85	9	11 March 1982		Sarah Hogg, Geoffrey Howe, John Silkin, David Steel	
86	10	18 March 1982		Norman Fowler, Ken Livingstone, Becky Tinsley, Barbara Wootton	
87	11	25 March 1982		John Alderson, Alan Clark, Sheila Rothwell, Arthur Scargill	
88	12	1 April 1982		Terry Marsland, John Smith, Norman St John-Stevas, Mike Thomas	
89	13	8 April 1982		Alun Chalfont, Judith Hart, David Howell, David Owen	
90	14	15 April 1982		Denis Healey, Russell Johnston, Geoffrey Rippon, Peregrine Worsthorne	
91	15	22 April 1982		John Hackett, Douglas Hurd, Drew Middleton, Edward Shackleton	
92	16	29 April 1982	Belfast	Peter Jenkins, Inez McCormack, Jim Prior, Merlyn Rees	
93	17	6 May 1982		Betty Boothroyd, Winston Churchill, Bruce Kent, Christopher Mayhew	
94	18	13 May 1982		David Blunkett, Kenneth Clarke, Conor Cruise O'Brien, Polly Toynbee	
95	19	20 May 1982		John Harvey-Jones, Brenda Maddox, Cecil Parkinson, Peter Shore	Presenter: Ludovic Kennedy
96	20	27 May 1982		Janey Buchan, Edward du Cann, Peter Jay, Sue Slipman	Presenter: Ludovic Kennedy
97	21	3 June 1982		Kina Avebury, Enoch Powell, Ivor Richard, Norman St John-Stevas	Presenter: Ludovic Kennedy
98	22	10 June 1982		John Hackett, Joan Lestor, John Mortimer, Angela Rumbold	
99	23	17 June 1982		Tony Benn, Michael Heseltine, Patricia Mann, David Steel	
100	24	28 October 1982		Norman Fowler, Neil Kinnock, Julia Neuberger, Marjorie Proops	
101	25	4 November 1982		Antonia Fraser, Denis Healey, Roy Jenkins, William Whitelaw	
102	26	11 November 1982	Cardiff	Leon Brittan, Gwyneth Dunwoody, Ann Leslie, Dafydd Wigley	
103	27	18 November 1982		Roy Evans, Harriet Harman, Sally Oppenheim-Barnes, Clive Thornton	
104	28	25 November 1982		Alan Beith, Rhodes Boyson, Asa Briggs, Ann Taylor	
105	29	2 December 1982		Peter Hain, Tom King, Bernard Levin, Margaret Wingfield	
106	30	9 December 1982		Julian Critchley, Detta O'Cathain, Joan Ruddock, Eric Varley	
107	31	16 December 1982		Claire Brooks, Patrick Meaney, Peter Shore, Peter Walker	

=== 1983 ===
#	No. in year	Airdate	Location	Panellists	Notes
108	1	13 January 1983		Monty Finniston, Rosalind Gilmore, Nigel Lawson, Arthur Scargill	
109	2	20 January 1983	Newcastle	Jack Cunningham, Peter Jenkins, Geoffrey Rippon, William Rodgers	
110	3	27 January 1983		Neil Cameron, Patricia Hewitt, Francis Pym, David Sheppard	
111	4	3 February 1983		Lynda Chalker, Winnie Ewing, Clive Sinclair, George Wright	
112	5	10 February 1983		John Gummer, Anne Jones, Paul Oestreicher, John Smith	
113	6	17 February 1983		Barbara Castle, Kenneth Clarke, Rosalyn Higgins, Richard Holme	
114	7	24 February 1983		Edward Gardner, Ken Livingstone, A. J. P. Taylor, Polly Toynbee	
115	8	3 March 1983		Jean Barker, Brian Glover, Tessa Jowell, Michael Mander	
116	9	10 March 1983		Edwina Currie, Neil Stewart, John Thorn, Des Wilson	Presenter: Ludovic Kennedy
117	10	17 March 1983		Geoffrey Howe, Gerald Kaufman, Patricia Mann, Shirley Williams	
118	11	24 March 1983		Donald Dewar, Mary Kenny, Dick Taverne, George Young	
119	12	31 March 1983		Grey Gowrie, Kate Hoey, William McCarthy, Madsen Pirie	
120	13	7 April 1983		Noel Annan, Helen Liddell, Geoffrey Pattie, Cyril Smith	
121	14	14 April 1983		David Blunkett, Edward du Cann, Andrew Knight, Sue Slipman	
122	15	21 April 1983		Jill Craigie, Patrick Mayhew, Beryl Platt, Russell Profitt	
123	16	28 April 1983		Neil McIntosh, Jim Mortimer, Anne Robinson, Norman Tebbit	
124	17	5 May 1983		Michael Foot, Michael Heseltine, Ann Leslie, David Steel	
125	18	12 May 1983		David Basnett, Leo Pliatzky, Nicholas Ridley, Elizabeth Sidney	
126	19	19 May 1983 (Note: 19 May 1983: During the 1983 general election campaign Conservative Foreign Secretary Francis Pym said on Question Time that he thought landslide victories did not produce successful governments. He was later sacked by the Prime Minister Margaret Thatcher.)		Roy Hattersley, David Owen, Francis Pym	
127	20	26 May 1983	Manchester	Tony Benn, Geoffrey Howe, David Penhaligon	
128	21	2 June 1983	Birmingham	Denis Healey, Cecil Parkinson, William Rodgers	
129	22	16 June 1983		Tony Benn, Michael Meadowcroft, Donald Trelford, William Whitelaw	
130	23	23 June 1983		Gwyneth Dunwoody, David Owen, Norman Tebbit, Clive Thornton	
131	24	30 June 1983	Cambridge	Enoch Powell, Clare Short, Norman St John-Stevas, George Thomas	
132	25	27 October 1983		Claire Brooks, John Gummer, Nicholas Henderson, Ken Livingstone	
133	26	3 November 1983		Robin Cook, Rosalind Gilmore, Emily Macfarquhar, Nicholas Ridley	
134	27	10 November 1983		Norman Fowler, Roy Hattersley, Wendy Hogg, Shirley Williams	
135	28	17 November 1983		Paddy Ashdown, Ann Clwyd, Bernard Levin, George Walden	
136	29	24 November 1983		Ian Gow, John Pardoe, Diana Rookledge, John Smith	
137	30	1 December 1983		John Harvey-Jones, Douglas Hurd, Jonathon Porritt, Barbara Switzer	
138	31	8 December 1983		Charles Kennedy, Gavin Laird, Clive Sinclair, George Younger	
139	32	15 December 1983		David Alton, John Hackett, Oonagh McDonald, James Prior	

=== 1984 ===
#	No. in year	Airdate	Location	Panellists	Notes
140	1	12 January 1984		Jo Foley, Tom King, Michael Meacher, Clive Thornton	
141	2	19 January 1984		Denis Healey, John Hoskyns, Francis Pym, Des Wilson	
142	3	26 January 1984		Noel Annan, Tony Banks, Edwina Currie, Ruth Levitt	
143	4	2 February 1984	Nottingham	Myra Blyth, Rhodes Boyson, Anthony Sampson, Jack Straw	
144	5	9 February 1984		Lesley Abdela, Jack Cunningham, Jenny Kirkpatrick, Peter Walker	
145	6	16 February 1984		Kenneth Baker, Len Murray, David Penhaligon, Elizabeth Rees	
146	7	23 February 1984		Margaret Beckett, Leon Brittan, Roy Jenkins, Peter Timms	
147	8	1 March 1984		Ann Burdus, Eric Heffer, Simon Hughes, Janet Young	
148	9	8 March 1984		Lalage Bown, Edward du Cann, Austin Mitchell, Donald Stewart	
149	10	15 March 1984	Sheffield	Kenneth Clarke, Rosalind Gilmore, Peter Shore, David Steel	
150	11	22 March 1984		Rodney Bickerstaffe, Cecil Parkinson, Margaret Sharp, Adam Thompson	
151	12	29 March 1984		David Blunkett, Patrick Jenkin, Madsen Pirie, Nancy Seear	
152	13	5 April 1984		Grey Gowrie, Peter Hall, Joan Lestor, Diana Warwick	Presenter: Bernard Levin
153	14	12 April 1984		Alan Clark, Jane Reed, Muriel Turner, Paul Tyler	Presenter: Sue Lawley
154	15	19 April 1984		James Anderton, Bryan Gould, Anne Sofer, Norman St. John-Stevas	
155	16	26 April 1984		John Cartwright, Lynda Chalker, Alistair Graham, Joan Ruddock	
156	17	3 May 1984		Gerald Kaufman, Nigel Lawson, Brenda Maddox, David Owen	
157	18	10 May 1984		Susan Crosland, Derek Ezra, David Howell, Chris Mullin	
158	19	17 May 1984		Harriet Harman, Malcolm Rifkind, Susan Thomas, Donald Trelford	
159	20	24 May 1984		Roy Close, Margaret Hodge, Polly Toynbee, George Young	
160	21	31 May 1984		Maggie Clay, James Eberle, Norman Lamont, George Robertson	
161	22	7 June 1984	Brussels	Edward Heath, Christine Ockrent, Roy Jenkins, Robin Cook	
162	23	14 June 1984		Tony Benn, Grey Gowrie, Detta O'Cathain, Donny O'Rourke	
163	24	21 June 1984		Antonia Fraser, Michael Meadowcroft, John Smith, Norman Tebbit	
164	25	12 July 1984		Kenneth Clarke, James Cooke, Ken Livingstone, Shirley Williams	
165	26	18 October 1984		George Galloway, Robert Maxwell, Polly Toynbee, David Young	
166	27	25 October 1984		David Alton, Joan Maynard, David Mellor, Enid Ralphs	
167	28	1 November 1984	Derry	Peter Archer, John Hume, Michael Mates, Enoch Powell	
168	29	8 November 1984		Paddy Ashdown, Roy Hattersley, Ann Leslie, Peter Walker	
169	30	15 November 1984		John Banham, Derek Hatton, Emma Nicholson, Shirley Williams	
170	31	22 November 1984		Barbara Castle, Douglas Hurd, Archy Kirkwood, Detta O'Cathain	
171	32	29 November 1984		Lalage Bown, Max Hastings, Frank Judd, Richard Luce	
172	33	6 December 1984	Leeds	Rodney Bickerstaffe, Claire Brooks, Kenneth Clarke, Peter Newsam	
173	34	13 December 1984		Jeremy Bullmore, John Moore, Jeff Rooker, Diana Warwick	
174	35	20 December 1984		Tony Blair, Bernard Levin, Richard Needham, Sue Slipman	

=== 1985 ===
#	No. in year	Airdate	Location	Panellists	Notes
175	1	10 January 1985		Ann Burdus, Denzil Davies, Malcolm Rifkind, William Rodgers	
176	2	17 January 1985		Margaret Joachim, Richard Needham, Andrew Neil, Clare Short	
177	3	24 January 1985		Jack Cunningham, Jo Foley, Geoffrey Howe, David Owen	
178	4	31 January 1985		Gwyneth Dunwoody, John Harvey-Jones, Tony Newton, Anthony Parsons	
179	5	7 February 1985		Elizabeth Cottrell, John Gunnell, Chris Patten, David Penhaligon	
180	6	14 February 1985		John Gummer, Dipak Nandy, George Robertson, Audrey Slaughter	
181	7	21 February 1985		Antonia Fraser, Michael Hancock, Tom King, Ken Livingstone	
182	8	28 February 1985		Norman Lamont, Jonathon Porritt, Elizabeth Rees, Norman Willis	
183	9	7 March 1985		Tony Benn, Kenneth Clarke, Anne Jones, David Steel	Presenter: Donald MacCormick
184	10	14 March 1985		Jeffrey Archer, Robin Cook, Jim Prior, Sue Slipman	Presenter: Donald MacCormick
185	11	21 March 1985		Leon Brittan, Rosalind Gilmore, Michael Meacher, Anne Sofer	Presenter: Donald MacCormick
186	12	28 March 1985		Oonagh McDonald, John Patten, Mary Warnock, Alan Watson	Presenter: Donald MacCormick
187	13	4 April 1985		Peter Jenkins, Jean Millar, John Prescott, Norman Tebbit	Presenter: Donald MacCormick
188	14	18 April 1985		Grey Gowrie, Laura Grimond, Denis Healey, Carol Smart	Presenter: Bernard Levin
189	15	25 April 1985		Myra Blyth, Donald Dewar, Teresa Gorman, Cecil Parkinson	Presenter: Sue Lawley
190	16	2 May 1985		Joel Barnett, Maggie Clay, Patrick Jenkin, Michael Montague	Presenter: Sue Lawley
191	17	9 May 1985		Lynda Chalker, Roy Jenkins, Jack Straw, Gordon Wilson	Presenter: Donald MacCormick
192	18	16 May 1985		Tony Blair, Edward du Cann, Peter Parker, Nancy Seear	Presenter: Donald MacCormick
193	19	23 May 1985		Gerald Kaufman, Sheila McKechnie, Ian Wrigglesworth, George Younger	Presenter: Donald MacCormick
194	20	30 May 1985		Margaret Beckett, Alex Carlile, Laurence Martin, George Walden	Presenter: Donald MacCormick
195	21	6 June 1985		David Blunkett, Norman Fowler, Christine Ockrent, Shirley Williams	
196	22	24 October 1985		Ann Burdus, Roy Evans, Roy Hattersley, Douglas Hurd	
197	23	31 October 1985		Frances Morrell, Chris Patten, David Penhaligon, Ruth Wishart	
198	24	7 November 1985		Kenneth Baker, Michael Meacher, Nick Raynsford, Shirley Williams	
199	25	14 November 1985		Alan Clark, Derek Hatton, Gavin Laird, Polly Toynbee	
200	26	21 November 1985		Paddy Ashdown, Robin Cook, Robin McCartney, Malcolm Rifkind	
201	27	28 November 1985	Swansea	Kenneth Clarke, Dafydd Elis-Thomas, Jean Millar, Giles Radice	
202	28	5 December 1985		Jim Prior, John Redwood, Clare Short, Sue Stapely	
203	29	12 December 1985		David Astor, Angela Rumbold, Auberon Waugh, Valerie Wise	

=== 1986 ===
#	No. in year	Airdate	Location	Panellists	Notes
204	1	9 January 1986		David Blunkett, Antonia Fraser, David Owen, Norman Tebbit	
205	2	16 January 1986		Harriet Harman, Norman Lamont, Donald Trelford, Des Wilson	
206	3	23 January 1986		Gerald Kaufman, Jonathon Porritt, Nicholas Ridley, Anne Sofer	
207	4	30 January 1986	Belfast	David Alton, Tom King, Ann Leslie, John Smith	
208	5	6 February 1986		Edwina Currie, Andrew Neil, William Rodgers, Tom Sawyer	
209	6	13 February 1986		Digby Anderson, Gwyneth Dunwoody, Richard Holme, Norman St John-Stevas	
210	7	20 February 1986		Leon Brittan, Walter Hayes, John Prescott, Sue Slipman	
211	8	27 February 1986		Tony Benn, Joe Haines, Michael Heseltine, Roy Jenkins	
212	9	6 March 1986		Jack Cunningham, Brenda Dean, John Harvey-Jones, Geoffrey Howe	
213	10	13 March 1986	Middlesbrough	Peter Bottomley, Tom McNally, Jane Reed, George Robertson	
214	11	20 March 1986		Rosalind Gilmore, Denis Healey, John MacGregor, Nancy Seear	
215	12	27 March 1986		John Banham, John Butcher, Laura Grimond, Ken Livingstone	
216	13	10 April 1986		Margaret Beckett, Rhodes Boyson, Simon Hughes, Peter Riddell	
217	14	17 April 1986		Donald Dewar, Norman Fowler, Nicholas Henderson, William Wallace	
218	15	24 April 1986		Alex Carlile, John Edmonds, Ann Leslie, John Moore	
219	16	1 May 1986	Aberdeen	Margaret Ewing, Archy Kirkwood, Oonagh McDonald, Geoffrey Pattie	
220	17	8 May 1986		Bill Morris, Suzanne Reeve, Ian Wrigglesworth, David Young	
221	18	15 May 1986		Paul Channon, Denzil Davies, Jo Foley, David Steel	
222	19	22 May 1986		Teresa Gorman, Michael Meadowcroft, Margaret Prosser, Nicholas Scott	
223	20	29 May 1986	Canterbury	James Cleminson, Bryan Gould, Edward Heath, Becky Tinsley	
224	21	5 June 1986		Margaret Clay, Michael Foot, Peter Jenkins, Peter Walker	
225	22	12 June 1986		Diane Abbott, Jeffrey Archer, Bill Jordan, Alan Watson	
226	23	19 June 1986		Kenneth Baker, Germaine Greer, David Owen, John Smith	
227	24	25 September 1986	Eastbourne	Gerald Kaufman, David Steel, Ian Wrigglesworth, George Younger	
228	25	2 October 1986	Blackpool	David Blunkett, Roy Hattersley, Norman Tebbit, Shirley Williams	
229	26	9 October 1986	Bournemouth	Paddy Ashdown, Denis Healey, Nigel Lawson, Jim Prior	
230	27	16 October 1986		Cecil Parkinson, William Rodgers, Joan Ruddock, Mary Ann Sieghart	
231	28	23 October 1986		Edwina Currie, Shirley Goodwin, John Prescott, Elizabeth Shields	
232	29	30 October 1986		Paul Channon, Oonagh McDonald, Andrew Neil, Alan Watson	
233	30	6 November 1986		Paul Boateng, Jeremy Bullmore, John Redwood, Polly Toynbee	
234	31	13 November 1986		Donald Dewar, Antonia Fraser, Douglas Hurd, Roy Jenkins	
235	32	20 November 1986		Ann Burdus, Alan Clark, Janice Lennon, Dennis Skinner	
236	33	27 November 1986		Walter Hayes, John Moore, Clare Short, Becky Tinsley	
237	34	4 December 1986		Bryan Gould, Geoffrey Howe, Peter Sutherland, Susan Thomas	
238	35	11 December 1986		Charles Kennedy, Ken Livingstone, John Patten, Katharine Whitehorn	

=== 1987 ===
#	No. in year	Airdate	Location	Panellists	Notes
239	1	15 January 1987		Kenneth Baker, Ian Hislop, Frances Morrell, Shirley Williams	Presenter: Sue Lawley
240	2	22 January 1987		Laura Grimond, Roy Hattersley, Dennis Potter, William Waldegrave	Presenter: Sue Lawley
241	3	29 January 1987		John Edmonds, Ann Leslie, Dick Taverne, David Young	
242	4	5 February 1987		Robin Cook, Sarah Hogg, Michael Howard, Anthony Sampson	
243	5	12 February 1987	Bradford	Michael Heseltine, Simon Hughes, Diana Jeuda, Charles Moore	
244	6	19 February 1987		Michael Meacher, Detta O'Cathain, Chris Patten, William Wallace	
245	7	26 February 1987		Alistair Graham, Bernie Grant, Angela Rumbold, Anne Sofer	
246	8	5 March 1987		Alex Carlile, Ann Clwyd, Norman Fowler, Max Hastings	
247	9	12 March 1987		David Alton, Rhodes Boyson, Isobel Lindsay, Bill Mackenzie	
248	10	19 March 1987		John Harvey-Jones, John MacGregor, Nancy Seear, John Smith	
249	11	26 March 1987		Denzil Davies, Howard Davies, Malcolm Rifkind, Chris Wilmore	
250	12	2 April 1987		Alan Beith, Tony Benn, Christina Lyon, George Walden	
251	13	9 April 1987	Derby	David Clark, Kenneth Clarke, Rod Hackney, Sue Stapely	
252	14	30 April 1987		Rosie Barnes, Nicholas Horsley, Norman Lamont, George Robertson	
253	15	7 May 1987		Harriet Harman, Peter Riddell, Peter Walker, Des Wilson	
254	16	14 May 1987	Bradford	David Blunkett, Usha Prashar, Nicholas Ridley, Sue Slipman	
255	17	21 May 1987		Kenneth Baker, Bryan Gould, Shirley Williams	
256	18	28 May 1987	Glasgow	Alan Beith, Kenneth Clarke, Denis Healey, Alex Salmond	
257	19	4 June 1987	Leicester	Roy Hattersley, Roy Jenkins, Nigel Lawson	
258	20	18 June 1987		Diane Abbott, Michael Heseltine, Andrew Neil, Cyril Smith	
259	21	17 September 1987		Robin Cook, Norman Fowler, Shirley Williams, Des Wilson	
260	22	24 September 1987		Linda Bellos, John Harvey-Jones, John Lloyd, Charles Moore	
261	23	1 October 1987	Brighton	Charles Kennedy, Ken Livingstone, John Smith, David Young	
262	24	8 October 1987	Blackpool	John Biffen, Cecil Parkinson, John Prescott, David Steel	
263	25	15 October 1987		Menzies Campbell, Harriet Harman, Sarah Harrison, David Mellor	
264	26	22 October 1987		John Banham, Donald Dewar, Polly Toynbee, John Wakeham	
265	27	29 October 1987		Edwina Currie, Mary Kenny, Clare Short, Matthew Taylor	
266	28	5 November 1987		Ann Burdus, David Sainsbury, Jack Straw, William Waldegrave	
267	29	12 November 1987		Barbara Amiel, Alan Beith, Tony Benn, Douglas Hurd	
268	30	19 November 1987		Neil McIntosh, Kenneth Miller, Chris Patten, Joan Ruddock	
269	31	26 November 1987		Maggie Clay, Frank Dobson, Nicholas Ridley, Ruth Wishart	
270	32	3 December 1987		Rosie Barnes, Tessa Blackstone, Oliver Letwin, Nick Scott	
271	33	10 December 1987		Gerald Kaufman, Christine Ockrent, William Rodgers, Norman Tebbit	

=== 1988 ===
#	No. in year	Airdate	Location	Panellists	Notes
272	1	7 January 1988		David Blunkett, Brenda Maddox, Malcolm Rifkind, Ian Wrigglesworth	
273	2	14 January 1988		Harriet Crawley, Joan Lestor, Angela Rumbold, Nancy Seear	
274	3	21 January 1988		John Edmonds, Teresa Gorman, Ann Leslie, Cyril Smith	
275	4	28 January 1988		Kenneth Clarke, Roy Hattersley, Janice Lennon, Robert Maclennan	
276	5	4 February 1988	Liverpool	Ann Clwyd, Norman Fowler, Derek Worlock	
277	6	11 February 1988		Gordon Brown, Chantal Cuer, John Moore, Andrew Neil	
278	7	18 February 1988		Howard Davies, Margaret Hodge, Michael Howard, Peter Riddell	
279	8	25 February 1988		Shirley Goodwin, Russell Johnston, Michael Meacher, Michael Portillo	
280	9	3 March 1988		Susan Crosland, Michael Heseltine, David Owen, Dennis Skinner	
281	10	10 March 1988	Belfast	Harold McCusker, Nuala O'Faolain, Merlyn Rees, George Younger	
282	11	17 March 1988		Malcolm Bruce, Janet Cohen, Bryan Gould, John Major	
283	12	24 March 1988		Max Hastings, Frank Field, Usha Prashar, Marion Roe	
284	13	14 April 1988		Paddy Ashdown, Kenneth Baker, Ann Taylor, Mary Warnock	
285	14	21 April 1988		Peter Luff, John MacGregor, Detta O'Cathain, John Prescott	
286	15	28 April 1988		Lynda Chalker, Antonia Fraser, Tom Sawyer, Brian Wolfson	
287	16	5 May 1988		Tom King, Sara Parkin, George Robertson, Shirley Williams	
288	17	12 May 1988		David Alton, Norman Lamont, Austin Mitchell, Pauline Perry	
289	18	19 May 1988	Norwich	Bernard Donoughue, Walter Hayes, Sheila McKechnie, John Patten	
290	19	26 May 1988		Eric Heffer, Sarah Hogg, Charles Kennedy, David Mellor	
291	20	2 June 1988		Stuart Holland, Charles Moore, Susan Thomas, George Walden	
292	21	9 June 1988		Patricia Hollis, Roy Jenkins, Suzanne Reeve, Nicholas Ridley	
293	22	16 June 1988		Michael Heseltine, Andrew Neil, Nancy Seear, John Smith	
294	23	22 September 1988		Alan Beith, Tessa Blackstone, Kenneth Clarke, David Owen	
295	24	29 September 1988	Fleetwood	Paddy Ashdown, Rosie Barnes, Norman Fowler, Martin O'Neill	
296	25	6 October 1988	Blackpool	Tony Benn, Roy Hattersley, Nicholas Ridley, Nancy Seear	
297	26	13 October 1988	Brighton	Edward Heath, Robin Cook, Charles Kennedy, Nigel Lawson	
298	27	20 October 1988		Peter Jenkins, Mo Mowlam, Angela Rumbold, Cyril Smith	
299	28	27 October 1988		Tony Blair, Ann Leslie, Jonathon Porritt, Michael Portillo	
300	29	3 November 1988		John Banham, Joanna Foster, Harriet Harman, Malcolm Rifkind	
301	30	10 November 1988		Janet Daley, Simon Jenkins, Gerald Kaufman, David Mellor	
302	31	17 November 1988		Nigel Lawson, David Marquand, David Montgomery, Clare Short	
303	32	24 November 1988		Barbara Amiel, Gordon Brown, Alex Carlile, Cecil Parkinson	
304	33	1 December 1988	Newcastle	Ann Burdus, Eric Forth, Antonia Fraser, Jack Straw	
305	34	8 December 1988		Lynda Chalker, Donald Dewar, Charles Moore, Marie Staunton	
306	35	15 December 1988		Chantal Cuer, Bryan Gould, Michael Heseltine, Enoch Powell	

=== 1989 ===
#	No. in year	Airdate	Location	Panellists	Notes
307	1	12 January 1989		Russell Johnston, Maeve Sherlock, Chris Smith, Norman Tebbit	
308	2	19 January 1989		John Biffen, Pauline Perry, John Prescott, David Willetts	
309	3	26 January 1989		Simon Hornby, Richard Ryder, David Steel, Ann Taylor	
310	4	2 February 1989	Stoke-on-Trent	Hartley Booth, Frank Dobson, Sue Slipman, Michael Spicer	
311	5	9 February 1989		Ian Aitken, Menzies Campbell, Jane Ewart-Biggs, Douglas Hurd	
312	6	16 February 1989		Teresa Gorman, Ben Pimlott, Mary Ann Sieghart, Arthur Scargill	
313	7	23 February 1989	Dundee	David Blunkett, Paul Channon, Jim Sillars, Judy Steel	
314	8	2 March 1989		Elizabeth Filkin, Quintin Hogg, Roy Hattersley, Tim Melville-Ross	
315	9	9 March 1989		Stuart Holland, Helen Liddell, William Rees-Mogg, William Waldegrave	
316	10	16 March 1989		Robin Cook, Sarah Hogg, Roy Jenkins, John Major	
317	11	6 April 1989		Edwina Currie, Nicholas Henderson, Brian Sedgemore, Ruth Wishart	
318	12	13 April 1989	Bangor	Harriet Harman, Michael Howard, Alan Watkins, Phil Williams	
319	13	20 April 1989		John Patten, Susan Thomas, Keith Vaz, Brian Wolfson	
320	14	27 April 1989		Jack Dromey, Max Hastings, John MacGregor, Sara Parkin	
321	15	4 May 1989	York	Edward Pearce, Nancy Seear, John Smith, Norman Tebbit	
322	16	11 May 1989		John Burgh, Frances Edmonds, Chris Patten, George Robertson	
323	17	18 May 1989		Elizabeth Filkin, Tom King, Andrew Neil, Joan Ruddock	
324	18	25 May 1989		Kenneth Baker, Brenda Dean, Ann Leslie, Linbert Spencer	
325	19	1 June 1989		Tony Benn, Kenneth Clarke, Shirley Williams, Elizabeth Symons	
326	20	8 June 1989		Paddy Ashdown, Patricia Hewitt, Geoffrey Howe, Bernard Levin	
327	21	15 June 1989		Paddy Ashdown, Peter Jenkins, Mo Mowlam, Peter Walker	
328	22	22 June 1989 (Note: 22 July 1989: This was the last edition of Question Time under Robin Day's chairmanship, programme included brief highlights of the past ten years.)		Michael Foot, Antonia Fraser, Michael Heseltine, David Owen	
329	23	12 July 1989	Paris	Leon Brittan, Chantal Cuer, Denis Healey, Yvette Roudy	
330	24	14 September 1989	Brighton	Paddy Ashdown, Roy Hattersley, Sara Parkin, Nicholas Ridley	
331	25	21 September 1989	London	Janet Daley, Chris Patten, Peter Riddell, Clare Short	
332	26	28 September 1989	London	Frances Edmonds, Peter Newsam, John Prescott, Norman Tebbit	
333	27	5 October 1989	Brighton	Kenneth Baker, Arthur Scargill, Nancy Seear, John Smith	
334	28	12 October 1989	Blackpool	Rosie Barnes, John Biffen, Gerald Kaufman, Cecil Parkinson	
335	29	19 October 1989	London	Paul Boateng, Lynda Chalker, Ann Leslie, Jonathon Porritt	
336	30	26 October 1989		Gordon Brown, Edwina Currie, Rita Donaghy, William Rees-Mogg	
337	31	2 November 1989		Eric Forth, Ian Hislop, Russell Johnston, Ann Taylor	
338	32	9 November 1989	London	Donald Dewar, Julia Langdon, Graham Leonard, Angela Rumbold	
339	33	16 November 1989		Patricia Hewitt, Tim Melville-Ross, Michael Portillo, Cyril Smith	
340	34	23 November 1989	London	Kenneth Baker, Menzies Campbell, Chantal Cuer, Bryan Gould	
341	35	30 November 1989	Birmingham	Mary Archer, Norman Lamont, Ken Livingstone, Linbert Spencer	
342	36	7 December 1989	London	Ian Aitken, Barbara Castle, Ian Crowther, David Hunt	
343	37	14 December 1989	London	Denis Healey, Geoffrey Howe, David Owen, Sara Parkin	

=== 1990 ===
#	No. in year	Airdate	Location	Panellists	Notes
344	1	18 January 1990	London	John Banham, Mary Holland, David Mellor, George Robertson	
345	2	25 January 1990	London	Douglas Hurd, Roy Jenkins, Mo Mowlam, Andrew Neil	
346	3	1 February 1990	London	Robin Cook, Pauline Perry, Anthony Sampson, Jean Barker	
347	4	8 February 1990	Glasgow	Paddy Ashdown, Margaret Ewing, George Younger, Frank Dobson	
348	5	15 February 1990	London	Margaret Beckett, Kenneth Clarke, Dr Madsen Pirie, Nina Temple	
349	6	22 February 1990	London	Kim Howells, Sheila McKechnie, Enoch Powell, David Willetts	
350	7	1 March 1990	London	Frank Field, Norman Fowler, Sue Stapely, Michael White	
351	8	8 March 1990	London	Jane Grant, Michael Howard, Mary Kenny, Joan Ruddock	
352	9	15 March 1990	London	Gordon Brown, John MacGregor, Mary Ann Sieghart, Des Wilson	
353	10	22 March 1990	London	Mark Bonham-Carter, Sarah Hogg, Nicholas Ridley, John Smith	
354	11	29 March 1990	Middlesbrough	Alan Beith, Virginia Bottomley, David Jenkins, Gavin Laird	
355	12	5 April 1990	London	Max Hastings, Peter Mandelson, Rosalind Miles, John Patten	
356	13	26 April 1990	London	Tessa Blackstone, David Montgomery, Roger Poole, Norman Tebbit	
357	14	3 May 1990	London	Jack Cunningham, June Osborne, Malcolm Rifkind, David Steel	
358	15	10 May 1990	London	Michael Heseltine, Detta O'Cathain, John Prescott, Alan Watkins	
359	16	17 May 1990	Oxford	Paul Foot, Dr Sheila Lawlor, Jack Straw, David Waddington	
360	17	24 May 1990	London	Lynda Chalker, Harriet Harman, John Harvey-Jones, Norman Stone	
361	18	31 May 1990	Truro	Tony Blair, Ann Leslie, Charles Kennedy, Emma Nicholson	
362	19	7 June 1990	London	Simon Jenkins, Tom King, Clare Short, Ruth Wishart	
363	20	14 June 1990	London	Tony Benn, David Blake, Chris Patten, Anne Burdus	
364	21	21 June 1990	London	Antonia Fraser, Nigel Lawson, John Smith, Shirley Williams	
365	22	20 September 1990	London	Paddy Ashdown, Roy Hattersley, Douglas Hurd, Robert Maxwell, Caspar Weinberger	
366	23	27 September 1990	Cardiff	Gerald Kaufman, Cecil Parkinson, David Steel, Alan Walters, Henry Kissinger	
367	24	4 October 1990	Blackpool	Edwina Currie, Bill Jordan, Dennis Skinner	
368	25	11 October 1990	Bournemouth	Bryan Gould, Michael Heseltine, Jean Lambert, Norman Tebbit	
369	26	18 October 1990 (Note: 18 October 1990: This edition was originally scheduled to feature four panellists of Tony Benn, Margaret Ewing, Andrew Neil and Malcolm Rifkind. However both Tony Benn and Andrew Neil were late to arrive, so Menzies Campbell and Magnus Linklater took their place, but eventually both Benn and Neil arrived 20 minutes into the programme. Thus this was the first edition to feature six panellists.)	Edinburgh	Menzies Campbell, Margaret Ewing, Malcolm Rifkind, Magnus Linklater, Tony Benn, Andrew Neil	
370	27	25 October 1990	London	Kenneth Clarke, David Owen, James Pickles, John Smith	
371	28	1 November 1990	London	David Blunkett, Brenda Dean, John Harvey-Jones, Edward Heath	
372	29	8 November 1990	Bradford	John Banham, David Mellor, John Prescott, Nancy Seear	
373	30	15 November 1990	Cambridge	Kenneth Baker, Gordon Brown, David Jenkins, Mary Whitehouse	
374	31	22 November 1990 (Note: 22 November 1990: Broadcast on the day of Margaret Thatcher's resignation. Transmitted in two parts with two different panels.)	London	Enoch Powell, David Owen, James Callaghan, Simon Jenkins; Michael Howard, Nigel Lawson, Paddy Ashdown, Roy Hattersley	
375	32	29 November 1990	London	Barbara Castle, Peter Lilley, Peter Morgan, Shirley Williams	
376	33	6 December 1990	Brighton	Max Beloff, Arthur Scargill, Ann Taylor, William Waldegrave	
377	34	13 December 1990	London		

=== 1991 ===
#	No. in year	Airdate	Location	Panellists	Notes
378	1	10 January 1991	London	Douglas Hurd, Roy Jenkins, Gerald Kaufman, Marjorie Thompson	
379	2	17 January 1991 (Note: 17 January 1991: Special Question Time concentrating on events and questions around the Gulf War, and split into two sections, with two different panels.)	London	Kenneth Clarke, Roy Hattersley, Paddy Ashdown, David Sheppard, Gerald Kaufman, David Owen, Bruce Kent	
380	3	24 January 1991	London	Henry E. Catto, Jr., Denis Healey, Ghada Karmi, Chris Patten	
381	4	31 January 1991	London	Edward Heath, Max Hastings, Sara Parkin, John Smith	
382	5	7 February 1991		Tony Banks, William Rees-Mogg, David Steel, Norman Tebbit	
383	6	14 February 1991		Jeffrey Archer, Margaret Beckett, Melvyn Bragg, Malcolm Rifkind	
384	7	21 February 1991	London	Kenneth Baker, Garret FitzGerald, Shirley Porter, John Prescott	
385	8	28 February 1991	London	Cecil Parkinson, John Prescott, Graham Leonard	
386	9	7 March 1991	London	Robin Cook, Edwina Currie, John Stalker, Des Wilson	
387	10	14 March 1991		Tony Blair, Peter Brooke, Helena Kennedy, Olga Maitland	
388	11	21 March 1991		Dr Ann Robinson, (Note: Dr Ann Robinson, head of policy unit at the Institute of Directors.) Nigel Lawson, John Smith and Alan Beith	
389	12	11 April 1991	London	Tony Benn, David Mellor, Simon Hughes, Stephen Fry	
390	13	18 April 1991	London	Bryan Gould, David Hunt, Detta O'Cathain, Cyril Smith	
391	14	25 April 1991	London	Alan Beith, John Pilger, Angela Rumbold, John Smith	
392	15	2 May 1991		Roy Hattersley, Dr. Ann Robinson, Nancy Seear, William Waldegrave	
393	16	9 May 1991		Gordon Brown, Janet Cohen, Sally Hamwee, Nicholas Ridley	
394	17	16 May 1991	London	Kenneth Baker, Garret FitzGerald, Zerbanoo Gifford, Clare Short	
395	18	23 May 1991	Birmingham	Anila Graham, Michael Howard, Charles Kennedy, Ken Livingstone	
396	19	30 May 1991		Paul Boateng, Geoffrey Howe, Rosalind Miles, Shirley Porter	
397	20	6 June 1991		Diana Cornish, Bernard Ingham, Glenda Jackson, Des Wilson	
398	21	13 June 1991		Virginia Bottomley, John Edmonds, Andrew Neil, Joan Ruddock	
399	22	12 September 1991	London	Tony Blair, Michael Heseltine, Julia Neuberger, Paddy Ashdown	
400	23	19 September 1991	London	Sara Parkin, David Owen, William Waldegrave and Jack Straw	
401	24	26 September 1991	Birmingham	John Banham, Mo Mowlam, Malcolm Rifkind, Marjorie Thompson	
402	25	3 October 1991	Falmer	Jack Cunningham, Norman Tebbit, Clare Short, Charles Kennedy	
403	26	10 October 1991	Fleetwood	Nicholas Ridley, Nancy Seear, David Hunt, Robin Cook	
404	27	17 October 1991	Edinburgh	Michael Forsyth, Margaret Ewing, Gordon Brown, David Steel	
405	28	24 October 1991	Nottingham	Kenneth Clarke, John Egan, Elizabeth Symons	
406	29	31 October 1991	London	Margaret Beckett, Garret FitzGerald, Roy Jenkins, John MacGregor	
407	30	7 November 1991	London	John Patten, Tessa Blackstone, Sir Cyril Smith, Rhiannon Chapman (Note: Rhiannon Chapman, director of the Industrial Society.)	
408	31	14 November 1991	London	Jennifer d'Abo, Norman Lamont, Roy Hattersley, Alan Beith	
409	32	21 November 1991	Cardiff	Alf Gordon, (Note: Alf Gordon, Welsh Develop Corporation.) Emily Blatch, Ken Livingstone, Dafydd Wigley	
410	33	28 November 1991	Swindon	David Mellor, David Blunkett	
411	34	5 December 1991	London	Tony Benn, Christine Crawley, Howard Davies, Gillian Shephard	
412	35	12 December 1991	Bristol	Esther Leneman, (Note: Esther Leneman, French radio and television journalist.) Steve Jones, Chris Patten, Harriet Harman	

=== 1992 ===
#	No. in year	Airdate	Location	Panellists	Notes
413	1	23 January 1992	Manchester	Virginia Bottomley, John Smith, Des Wilson	
414	2	30 January 1992	Bristol	Kenneth Baker, John Harvey-Jones, Ann Taylor	
415	3	6 February 1992	London	Shirley Williams, Patricia Hewitt, Edwina Currie, Yve Newbold	
416	4	13 February 1992	London	Gerald Kaufman, Edward Heath	
417	5	20 February 1992	London	Bernard Ingham, Peter Lilley, Inga-Stina Robson, John Prescott	
418	6	27 February 1992	London	Tom King, William Rodgers	
419	7	5 March 1992	London	Menzies Campbell, Michael Howard, Joan Ruddock	
420	8	12 March 1992	London	Douglas Hurd, Margaret Beckett, Dr. Ann Robinson	
421	9	19 March 1992	Luton	Gordon Brown, Ieuan Wyn Jones, Chris Patten, David Steel	
422	10	26 March 1992	Birmingham	Norman Lamont, Roy Hattersley, Simon Hughes, John Taylor	
423	11	2 April 1992	London	Michael Heseltine, Alex Salmond, John Smith, Alan Beith	
424	12	21 May 1992	London	Paul Boateng, Kenneth Clarke, Anthony Scrivener, Susan Masham	
425	13	23 April 1992	Hatfield	Tony Blair, Shirley Williams, Dr Elizabeth Nelson, Jeffrey Archer	
426	14	30 April 1992	London	Howard Davies, Nirj Deva, Tessa Jowell, Liz Lynne	
427	15	7 May 1992	Glasgow	Ruth Wishart, Margaret Ewing, Ian Lang, Ken Livingstone	
428	16	14 May 1992	Bristol	Margaret Hodge, Bill Jordan, David Puttnam, Alan Clark	
429	17	28 May 1992	Reading	Yvonne Barton, (Note: Yvonne Barton from British Gas.) John MacGregor, Bryan Gould and Matthew Taylor	
430	18	4 June 1992	London	Virginia Bottomley, Marjorie Mowlam, Dr Sheila Lawlor, (Note: Dr Sheila Lawlor from the Centre for Policy Studies.) Dr Marie Stewart (Note: Dr Marie Stewart, an Equal Opportunities Consultant.)	
431	19	11 June 1992	Derby	Paddy Ashdown, Edwina Currie, John Smith, Ian Hay Davison	
432	20	18 June 1992	London	Malcolm Rifkind, John Prescott	
433	21	17 September 1992	London	John Patten, Robin Cook, Howard Davies	
434	22	24 September 1992		Denis Healey, Cecil Parkinson	
435	23	1 October 1992	Blackpool	Michael Portillo, Arthur Scargill, Margaret Beckett, Malcolm Bruce	
436	24	8 October 1992	Brighton	Gordon Brown, Michael Howard, Paddy Ashdown, Sir Clifford Chetwood	
437	25	15 October 1992	London	Judith Chaplin, Janet Anderson, Liz Lynne, Bernard Ingham	
438	26	22 October 1992	Maidstone	Harriet Harman, Andrew Neil, Bernard Weatherill	
439	27	29 October 1992	Washington, D.C.	Jeane Kirkpatrick, Kurt Schmoke, Ed Koch, Vin Weber, Shirley Williams	
440	28	5 November 1992	London	William Waldegrave, Jack Cunningham, Julia Neuberger, Michael Dobbs	
441	29	12 November 1992	London	Neil Kinnock, Kenneth Clarke, Roy Jenkins, Elizabeth Symons	
442	30	19 November 1992	Birmingham	Nigel Lawson, John Prescott, Anna Vinton	
443	31	26 November 1992	Norwich	Gillian Shephard, Joan Ruddock, Lorna Fitzsimons, Tim Waterstone	
444	32	3 December 1992	Southampton	David Mellor, Peter Mandelson, Russell Johnston	
445	33	10 December 1992	London	John MacGregor, Mel Read, Charles Powell, Holger K. Nielsen	

=== 1993 ===
#	No. in year	Airdate	Location	Panellists	Notes
446	1	14 January 1993	London	Tony Blair, Virginia Bottomley, Patience Purchas, David Steel	
447	2	21 January 1993	Birmingham	David Blunkett, Jean Denton, Elaine Foster, Edward Roberts	
448	3	28 January 1993	London	Simon Jenkins, Mo Mowlam	
449	4	4 February 1993	London	Tony Benn, Jan Hall, Michael Heseltine, Ian McAllister	
450	5	11 February 1993	Bristol	Douglas Hurd, Dawn Primarolo, Hilary Williams	
451	6	18 February 1993	London	Nicholas Soames, Ken Livingstone	
452	7	25 February 1993	London	George Young, Kate Hoey	
453	8	4 March 1993	London	Brian Mawhinney, Tessa Blackstone, Charles Kennedy	
454	9	11 March 1993		Malcolm Rifkind, Paul Boateng	
455	10	18 March 1993	Cardiff	Gordon Brown, John Harvey-Jones, David Hunt, Ieuan Wyn Jones	
456	11	25 March 1993	London	Kenneth Baker, Moira Constable, Pauline Green, David Starkey	
457	12	1 April 1993	London	Gyles Brandreth, John Eatwell, Amanda Platell	
458	13	22 April 1993	Manchester	Roy Hattersley, Edwina Currie, Kay Coleman, Peter Jonas	
459	14	29 April 1993	Bristol	Pam Charlwood, Glenys Kinnock, Emma Nicholson, Elizabeth Symons	
460	15	6 May 1993	Maidstone	Jonathan Aitken, Judi Clements, Bryan Gould, Tim Razzall	
461	16	13 May 1993	Leeds	Frank Dobson, Timothy Eggar, John Monks, Dr. Ann Robinson	
462	17	20 May 1993	London	Lynda Chalker, Alan Eastwood, Patricia Hewitt, Ray Williamson	
463	18	27 May 1993	London	Margaret Beckett, Simon Hughes, Andrew Neil, Tony Newton	
464	19	3 June 1993	Manchester	Luna Frank-Riley, Edward Heath, Martin Jacques, Gerald Kaufman	
465	20	10 June 1993	Glasgow	Margaret Ewing, Ian Lang, Joyce McMillan, Jack Straw	
466	21	17 June 1993	London	Michael R. Angus, John Prescott, Norman Tebbit, Shirley Williams	
467	22	16 September 1993	London	Howard Davies, Roy Jenkins, Norman Lamont, Clare Short	
468	23	23 September 1993	London	Alan Beith, Robert Horton, Michael Howard, Mo Mowlam	
469	24	30 September 1993	Brighton	Tony Blair, John Edmonds, Liz Lynne, David Mellor	
470	25	7 October 1993	Blackpool	Menzies Campbell, Harriet Harman, Simon Jenkins, John Patten	
471	26	14 October 1993	Maidstone	Bryan Gould, Bernard Ingham, Elizabeth Symons, William Waldegrave	
472	27	21 October 1993	Birmingham	Alan Clark, Victoria Glendinning, Robert Key, Peter Mandelson	
473	28	28 October 1993	London	Peter Taylor, Charles Pollard, George Carman, Vivien Stern	
474	29	4 November 1993	London	Emeka Anyaoku, Tony Benn, Edwina Currie, Niall Ferguson	
475	30	11 November 1993	Leeds	Hilary Armstrong, Stephen Dorrell, Arthur Scargill, David Steel	
476	31	18 November 1993	Bristol	Gordon Brown, Malcolm Bruce, Norman Fowler, Christina Gorna	
477	32	25 November 1993	London	Roy Hattersley, Margaret Hodge, David Hunt, Sara Morrison	
478	33	2 December 1993	London	Michael Portillo, Robin Cook	
479	34	9 December 1993	London	Michael Heseltine, Neil Kinnock, Julia Neuberger, Michael Dobbs	

=== 1994 ===
#	No. in year	Airdate	Location	Panellists	Notes
480	1	13 January 1994	London	Paddy Ashdown, Kenneth Clarke, John Prescott, Dr. Ann Robinson	
481	2	20 January 1994 (Note: 20 January 1994: This edition was notable for a confrontation between Jeffrey Archer and David Starkey over the age of homosexual consent.)	Birmingham	Jeffrey Archer, Garret FitzGerald, Estelle Morris, David Starkey	
482	3	27 January 1994	Maidstone	Virginia Bottomley, Ian Hay Davidson, Brenda Dean, Steve Jones	
483	4	3 February 1994	London	Kamlesh Bahl, Roy Jenkins, Peter Lilley, Ken Livingstone	
484	5	10 February 1994	London		
485	6	17 February 1994	London	Max Hastings, Michael Mansfield, John MacGregor, Mo Mowlam	
486	7	24 February 1994	London	Tony Blair, Peter Hennessy, Douglas Hogg, Ann Leslie	
487	8	3 March 1994	London	Glenda Jackson, Andrew Neil, David Steel, Nicholas Soames	
488	9	10 March 1994	Nottingham	Christina Baxter, Jack Cunningham, Paul Johnson, William Waldegrave	
489	10	17 March 1994	Cardiff	John Redwood, Kim Howells, Ieuan Wyn Jones, Liz Symons	
490	11	24 March 1994	Manchester	Liz Lynne, John Patten, Robert Scott, Jack Straw	
491	12	14 April 1994	Birmingham	Margaret Beckett, Anne Minto, Norman Tebbit, Shirley Williams	
492	13	21 April 1994	London	David Alton, Tony Benn, Gerald Malone, Sara Morrison	
493	14	28 April 1994	Bristol	John Gummer, Harriet Harman, Charles Kennedy, Terry Waite	
494	15	5 May 1994	London	Glenys Kinnock, Simon Jenkins, Norman Lamont, Menzies Campbell	
495	16	12 May 1994 (Note: 12 May 1994: Edition following the death of Labour Party leader John Smith, which sees panellists depart from the usual political debate to pay tribute to Smith instead.)	Edinburgh	Menzies Campbell, Malcolm Rifkind, George Robertson, Alex Salmond	
496	17	19 May 1994	Norwich	Edwina Currie, Simon Hughes, Gerald Kaufman, Charles Powell	
497	18	26 May 1994	Nottingham	Alan Beith, Terence Conran, John MacGregor, Joyce Quin	
498	19	2 June 1994	London	Michael Heseltine, John Prescott, P. D. James, Alex Carlile	
499	20	9 June 1994		David Hunt, David Blunkett, Shirley Williams, Colin Blakemore	
500	21	16 June 1994	London	Valerie Amos, Robin Cook, Tim Clement-Jones, Michael Portillo	
501	22	15 September 1994	London	Stephen Dorrell, Harriet Harman, Ian Hislop, Anne-Marie Huby	
502	23	22 September 1994	Leeds	Menzies Campbell, Robin Cook, Jean Denton, Judith Donovan	
503	24	29 September 1994	London	Roy Calne, Alan Clark, Anne Kelleher, Clare Short	
504	25	6 October 1994	Blackpool	Gordon Brown, Louise Christian, Teresa Gorman, Richard Holme	
505	26	13 October 1994	Bournemouth	Malcolm Bruce, David Hunt, Mo Mowlam, Mary Ann Sieghart	
506	27	20 October 1994	London	Fiona Gilmore, Jude Kelly, John Prescott, John Redwood	
507	28	27 October 1994	London	Margaret Beckett, Daniel Finkelstein, Gerald Malone, Denise Searle	
508	29	3 November 1994	Bristol	Frank Dobson, Roger Gale, Charles Kennedy, Cristina Odone	
509	30	10 November 1994	London	Diane Abbott, Christine Hancock, Norman Lamont, Matthew Parris	
510	31	17 November 1994		Janet Daley, Tony Newton, Susan Thomas, Jack Straw	
511	32	24 November 1994	Dundee	Hilary Campbell, Helen Liddell, John MacKay, Alex Salmond	
512	33	1 December 1994	London	Alex Carlile, Gill Nott, Ann Taylor, George Young	
513	34	8 December 1994	Belfast	Ken Maginnis, Patrick Mayhew, Ivor Richard, Bríd Rodgers	
514	35	15 December 1994	Oxford	Ruth Deech, Dawn Primarolo, Malcolm Rifkind, Francis Wheen	

=== 1995 ===
#	No. in year	Airdate	Location	Panellists	Notes
515	1	12 January 1995	London	Niall Ferguson, Victoria Glendinning, Margaret Hodge, Michael Howard	
516	2	19 January 1995	Southampton	Edwina Currie, John Denham, Gwynneth Flower, Matthew Taylor	
517	3	26 January 1995	Liverpool	David Alton, Rosie Boycott, Alistair Burt, Angela Eagle	
518	4	2 February 1995	London	Michael Ancram, Paul Boateng, Christopher Frayling, Jan Hall	
519	5	9 February 1995	Newcastle	Alan Beith, Kate Hoey, Teddy Taylor, Anne Wright	
520	6	16 February 1995	Cardiff	Ann Clwyd, Fiona Driscoll, Peter Lilley, Dafydd Wigley	
521	7	23 February 1995	London	Germaine Greer, Michael Portillo, Joyce Quin, David Steel	
522	8	2 March 1995	Colchester	Judith Church, Jeremy Hanley, Jean Lambert, Robin Page	
523	9	9 March 1995	Leicester	Kamlesh Bahl, Liz Lynne, Steven Norris, Chris Smith	
524	10	16 March 1995	London	Colin Blakemore, Jo Brand, Brian Mawhinney, Joan Ruddock	
525	11	23 March 1995	Glasgow	Donald Dewar, Margaret Ewing, Ian Lang, Ray Michie	
526	12	30 March 1995	London	Angela Browning, Jack Cunningham, Diana Maddock, Frederic Raphael	
527	13	27 April 1995	Birmingham	Paddy Ashdown, David Hunt, Bridget Rosewell, Clare Short	
528	14	11 May 1995	Caernarfon	Neil Hamilton, Glenys Kinnock, Elfyn Llwyd, Rosemary Righter	
529	15	18 May 1995	Plymouth	Alan Clark, John Denham, Jessica Mann, Susan Thomas	
530	16	25 May 1995	Norwich	Virginia Bottomley, John Charmley, Frances Crook, Alistair Darling	
531	17	1 June 1995	London	Menzies Campbell, Robin Cook, Ann Leslie, Nicholas Soames	
532	18	15 June 1995	London	Jonathan Aitken, Josephine Hart, George Robertson, Barbara Young	
533	19	22 June 1995	Manchester	Simon Hughes, Carolyn Johnson, Michael Mates, Mo Mowlam	
534	20	21 September 1995	Glasgow	Roseanna Cunningham, Charles Kennedy, Michael Hirst, George Robertson	
535	21	28 September 1995	London	Patricia Hewitt, Steve Jones, John Maples, Sarah Sands	
536	22	5 October 1995	Brighton	Robin Cook, Lisa Jardine, Liz Lynne, Norman Tebbit	
537	23	12 October 1995	Blackpool	Margaret Beckett, Alex Carlile, Kenneth Clarke, Marilyn Orcharton	
538	24	19 October 1995	London	Louise Christian, Stephen Dorrell, Ian Hislop, John Prescott	
539	25	26 October 1995	Birmingham	Roy Hattersley, Norman Lamont, Diana Maddock, Mary Ann Sieghart	
540	26	2 November 1995	Cardiff	Dafydd Elis-Thomas, William Hague, Margaret Jay, Natalie Wheen	
541	27	9 November 1995	London	Ken Livingstone, Sheila Masters, John Redwood, Elizabeth Symons	
542	28	16 November 1995	London	Frank Dobson, Michael Forsyth, Anne-Marie Huby, Ray Michie	
543	29	23 November 1995	Leeds	Keith Hellawell, Richard Littlejohn, Angela Rumbold, Ann Taylor	
544	30	30 November 1995	London	Harriet Harman, Roy Jenkins, Shriti Vadera, William Waldegrave	
545	31	7 December 1995	Belfast	Michael Ancram, Seamus Mallon, Mo Mowlam, David Trimble	
546	32	14 December 1995	Nottingham	Tony Banks, David Evans, Ruth Mackenzie, Gill Nott	

=== 1996 ===
#	No. in year	Airdate	Location	Panellists	Notes
547	1	11 January 1996	London	Edwina Currie, Nick Harvey, Tina Knight, Peter Mandelson	
548	2	18 January 1996	Bristol	Roger Freeman, Max Hastings, Elizabeth Meehan, Joan Ruddock	
549	3	25 January 1996	London	Virginia Bottomley, Simon Hughes, Clare Short, Stephen Tumim	
550	4	1 February 1996	Birmingham	Alan Duncan, Ruth Lea, Emma Nicholson, Chris Smith	
551	5	8 February 1996	Manchester	Tessa Jowell, Rodney Klevan, Peter Lilley, Mavis Nicholson	
552	6	15 February 1996	Southampton	Malcolm Bruce, Kenneth Clarke, Bronwen Maddox, John Prescott	
553	7	22 February 1996	London	Tony Benn, Claire Holder, Tessa Keswick, Brian Mawhinney	
554	8	29 February 1996	Norwich	David Blunkett, Archy Kirkwood, Bridget Ogilvie, Ann Widdecombe	
555	9	7 March 1996	Newcastle	Rosie Boycott, Andrew Foster, Gerald Malone, Joyce Quin	
556	10	14 March 1996	London	Donald Dewar, Michael Heseltine, Gerry Robinson, Shirley Williams	
557	11	21 March 1996	Liverpool	Teresa Gorman, Cristina Odone, Jack Straw, Christopher Tugendhat	
558	12	28 March 1996	London	Margaret Beckett, Menzies Campbell, Anne McElvoy, Tony Newton	
559	13	18 April 1996	Southampton	Peg Alexander, Alistair Darling, Diana Maddock, David Willetts	
560	14	25 April 1996	Nottingham	Paddy Ashdown, Kate Barker, Angela Browning, Robin Cook	
561	15	9 May 1996	Edinburgh	Iain Duncan Smith, Margaret Ewing, Mo Mowlam, David Steel	
562	16	16 May 1996	London	David Howell, Rana Kabbani, Sheila Masters, Peter Shore	
563	17	23 May 1996	Manchester	Simon Heffer, John Monks, Angela Rumbold, Clare Short	
564	18	30 May 1996	Bristol	Paul Boateng, Christine Laird, Margaret Sharp, William Waldegrave	
565	19	6 June 1996	London	Ian Lang, Glenda Jackson, Bernard Ingham, Jo Brand	
566	20	13 June 1996	Birmingham	Anne Campbell, Charles Kennedy, Norman Lamont, Prue Leith	
567	21	26 September 1996	London	Menzies Campbell, Harriet Harman, Peter Lilley, Bronwen Maddox	
568	22	3 October 1996	Blackpool	Gordon Brown, William Hague, Charles Kennedy, Lesley Knox	
569	23	10 October 1996	Bournemouth	Robin Cook, Stephen Dorrell, Ruth Lea, Emma Nicholson	
570	24	17 October 1996	London	Margaret Beckett, Christopher Haskins, Michael Heseltine, Sheila Lawlor	
571	25	24 October 1996	Birmingham	Nick Harvey, Frederic Raphael, Ann Taylor, Ann Widdecombe	
572	26	31 October 1996	Cardiff	Glenys Kinnock, Brian Mawhinney, Melanie Phillips, Dafydd Wigley	
573	27	7 November 1996	London	Alison Carnwath, Roy Hattersley, Lisa Jardine, John Redwood	
574	28	14 November 1996	Nottingham	Douglas Hogg, Patricia Hollis, Raj Persaud, Sandi Toksvig	
575	29	21 November 1996	Glasgow	Winnie Ewing, Archy Kirkwood, Norman Lamont, Brian Wilson	
576	30	28 November 1996	London	Malcolm Bruce, Alistair Darling, Michael Jack, Pauline Neville-Jones	
577	31	5 December 1996	Belfast	John Hume, Patrick Mayhew, Mo Mowlam, John Taylor	
578	32	12 December 1996	Manchester	Roger Freeman, Peter Hitchens, Liz Lynne, John Prescott	
579	33	19 December 1996	London	Valerie Amos, Matthew Parris, Malcolm Rifkind, Clare Short	

=== 1997 ===
#	No. in year	Airdate	Location	Panellists	Notes
580	1	23 January 1997	London	Carmen Callil, Frank Dobson, Charles Moore, Gillian Shephard	
581	2	30 January 1997	Norwich	Ian Lang, Robert Maclennan, Mary Ann Sieghart, Jack Straw	
582	3	6 February 1997	London	Janet Anderson, Angela Browning, Richard Littlejohn, Dafydd Wigley	
583	4	13 February 1997	Leeds	Kenneth Clarke, Robin Cook, Rosalind Gilmore, David Steel	
584	5	20 February 1997	London	Donald Dewar, Germaine Greer, Michael Howard, Roy Jenkins	
585	6	27 February 1997	Southampton	Mo Mowlam, Alex Salmond, Paul Tyler, George Young	
586	7	6 March 1997	London	Don Foster, Harriet Harman, Ian Hislop, Tony Newton	
587	8	13 March 1997	Birmingham	Tony Benn, Frederick Forsyth, Edward Heath, Liz Lynne	
588	9	20 March 1997	London	Anne McElvoy, Michael Portillo, Shirley Williams, Andrew Smith	
589	10	3 April 1997		Alex Salmond, Dafydd Wigley	
590	11	10 April 1997	London	Paddy Ashdown	
591	12	17 April 1997	London	John Major	
592	13	24 April 1997 (Note: 1997: In the build-up to the 1997 General Election, the three main party leaders answered questions from a studio audience.)	London	Tony Blair	
593	14	8 May 1997		Peter Lilley, Andrew Neil, Ann Taylor, Jenny Tonge	
594	15	15 May 1997		Kenneth Clarke, Ruth Lea, Peter Mandelson, Shirley Williams	
595	16	22 May 1997		Frank Dobson, Michael Howard, Gill Nott, Polly Toynbee	
596	17	29 May 1997	Manchester	Michael Ancram, Jackie Ballard, Lynn Collins, John Prescott	
597	18	5 June 1997	London	Clive Anderson, Margaret Beckett, Julia Middleton, John Redwood	
598	19	12 June 1997	Newcastle	Teresa Gorman, Jacqui Smith, Adair Turner, Francis Wheen	
599	20	19 June 1997	London	Martin Bell, Linda Colley, Robin Cook, Tom King	
600	21	25 September 1997	London	Rosie Boycott, Charles Kennedy, Jack Straw, Ann Widdecombe	
601	22	2 October 1997	Southampton	Malcolm Bruce, Harriet Harman, Peter Lilley, Judy McKnight	
602	23	9 October 1997	Manchester	Menzies Campbell, Kay Coleman, Frank Dobson, Archie Norman	
603	24	16 October 1997	London	Norman Fowler, Ann Leslie, George Robertson, Bridget Rosewell	
604	25	23 October 1997	Belfast	Gerry Adams, John Dunlop, John Hume, Andrew Hunter, Paul Murphy	
605	26	30 October 1997	Nottingham	David Blunkett, Iain Duncan Smith, Sarah Ludford, Janet Paraskeva	
606	27	6 November 1997	London	Paul Foot, Cheryl Gillan, Clare Short, David Starkey	
607	28	13 November 1997	Leeds	Hugh Dykes, John Redwood, Joan Smith, Brian Wilson	
608	29	20 November 1997	London	Lisa Jardine, Peter Mandelson, John Maples, Anne Minto	
609	30	27 November 1997	Birmingham	Oona King, Julie Kirkbride, Richard Littlejohn, Lembit Öpik	
610	31	4 December 1997		Robin Cook, Heather Rabbatts	
611	32	11 December 1997	Cardiff	Michael Ancram, Ron Davies, Nigella Lawson, Dafydd Wigley	
612	33	18 December 1997	London	Germaine Greer, Michael Heseltine, Chris Smith, Shirley Williams	

=== 1998 ===
#	No. in year	Airdate	Location	Panellists	Notes
613	1	15 January 1998	London	Michael Cashman, Judith Donovan, Francis Maude, Ann Taylor	
614	2	22 January 1998	Southampton	Clive Anderson, Don Foster, Barbara Roche, Ann Widdecombe	
615	3	29 January 1998	Glasgow	Donald Findlay, Eddie Izzard, Gavin Strang, Nicola Sturgeon	
616	4	5 February 1998	Norwich	Derek Fatchett, Susan Greenfield, Cecil Parkinson, Jenny Tonge	
617	5	12 February 1998	London	Margaret Beckett, Angela Browning, Trevor Phillips, Andrew Roberts	
618	6	19 February 1998	Nottingham	Hilary Armstrong, Nick Harvey, Peter Hitchens, David Willetts	
619	7	26 February 1998	London	Tony Benn, Alan Duncan, Jude Kelly, Emma Nicholson	
620	8	5 March 1998	Leeds	Peg Alexander, Simon Burns, Clarissa Dickson-Wright, Alun Michael	
621	9	12 March 1998	Cardiff	John Bercow, Louise Christian, Peter Hain, Phil Willis	
622	10	19 March 1998	London	Alistair Darling, Peter Lilley, Malcolm Bruce, Hilary Wainwright	
623	11	26 March 1998	Birmingham	Jackie Ballard, Geoff Hampton, David Heathcoat-Amory, Michael Meacher	
624	12	2 April 1998		Frank Dobson, Teresa Gorman, Liz Lynne, Sandi Toksvig	
625	13	16 April 1998	Belfast	John Hume, Robert McCartney, Martin McGuinness, Dermot Nesbitt	
626	14	23 April 1998	Manchester	Shelagh Diplock, Norman Fowler, Gerald Kaufman, David Rendel	
627	15	30 April 1998	Leeds	Michael Ancram, Paddy Ashdown, Nyta Mann, Jack Straw	
628	16	14 May 1998	Glasgow	Donald Dewar, Charles Kennedy, Raymond Robertson, Elaine C. Smith	
629	17	28 May 1998	Birmingham	Peta Buscombe, Oliver James, Ann Leslie, Chris Smith	
630	18	4 June 1998	London	Beatrix Campbell, Menzies Campbell, Harriet Harman, Michael Howard	
631	19	11 June 1998	Newcastle	Jack Cunningham, Leanda de Lisle, Anne-Marie Huby, John Redwood	
632	20	18 June 1998	London	Tony Benn, Edward Heath, David Steel, Polly Toynbee	
633	21	24 September 1998	London	Ann Widdecombe, Cristina Odone, Charles Kennedy, Norman Pace, Jack Cunningham	
634	22	1 October 1998	Manchester	Chris Smith, Michael Ancram, Janet Daley, Rodney Bickerstaffe, Emma Nicholson	
635	23	8 October 1998	Bournemouth	Clare Short, Richard Branson, Michael Howard, David Yelland	
636	24	15 October 1998	Leeds	Frederick Forsyth, Ozwald Boateng, Angela Eagle, Stephen Dorrell, Jenny Tonge	
637	25	22 October 1998	Cardiff	Michael Winner, Ron Davies, John Redwood, Helen Mary Jones, Mary Ann Sieghart	
638	26	29 October 1998	Birmingham	Brian Sewell, Norman Fowler, Diane Abbott, Menzies Campbell, Julia Neuberger	
639	27	5 November 1998	London	Frank Dobson, Peter Hitchens, Shirley Williams, David Willetts, Maeve Sherlock	
640	28	12 November 1998	Glasgow	Michael Forsyth, Helen Liddell, Roseanna Cunningham, Simon Hughes, Jeremy Isaacs	
641	29	19 November 1998	Peterborough	Richard Littlejohn, Paul Heaton, Virginia Bottomley, Patricia Hollis, Brian Rix	
642	30	26 November 1998	Newcastle	Paul Sykes, Chris Patten, Diana Maddock, Nick Brown, Nigella Lawson	
643	31	3 December 1998	Southampton	Roy Hattersley, Piers Morgan, Janet Street-Porter, Iain Duncan Smith	
644	32	10 December 1998	Manchester	Ken Livingstone, Francis Maude, Derek Draper, Ann Leslie, Margo MacDonald	
645	33	17 December 1998	Nottingham	Mo Mowlam, Kenneth Clarke, Robert Ayling, Simon Heffer, Beatrix Campbell	

=== 1999 ===
#	No. in year	Airdate	Location	Panellists	Notes
646	1	14 January 1999	London	Michael Portillo, Ann Taylor, Matthew Parris, Fay Weldon, Malcolm Bruce	
647	2	21 January 1999	Leeds	David Trimble, Teresa Gorman, Bill Morris, Liz Lynne, Hilary Wainwright	
648	3	28 January 1999	Plymouth	Tony Benn, Lembit Öpik, Rick Stein, Angela Browning, Mandi Norwood	
649	4	4 February 1999	London	Peter Lilley, Rosie Boycott, Nick Harvey, Christopher Haskins, Amanda Foreman	
650	5	11 February 1999	Southampton	Janet Anderson, Norman Lamont, Archy Kirkwood, Max Clifford, Alice Thomson	
651	6	18 February 1999	Hull	Jo Brand, Tony Banks, Martin Bell, Alan Duncan, Susan Greenfield	
652	7	25 February 1999 (Note: 25 February 1999: This edition concerned the findings from the Stephen Lawrence enquiry.)	London	Michael Mansfield, Glen Smyth, Paul Boateng, Norman Fowler, Annie Stewart	
653	8	4 March 1999	Maidstone	Tony Robinson, Alan Clark, Ruth Lea, George Robertson, Elspeth Howe	
654	9	11 March 1999	Manchester	Clare Short, John Redwood, Jackie Ballard, Germaine Greer, Andrew Neil	
655	10	18 March 1999	London	Norman Tebbit, Billy Bragg, Polly Toynbee, Oona King, Steven Norris	
656	11	25 March 1999	Sheffield	David Blunkett, David Steel, Anne-Marie Huby, Tim Yeo, Dorothy Grace-Jones	
657	12	15 April 1999	Cardiff	Dafydd Wigley, Glenys Kinnock, Jenny Randerson, John Maples, Tim Spicer	
658	13	22 April 1999	Glasgow	Donald Dewar, Alex Salmond, Jim Wallace, David McLetchie	
659	14	29 April 1999	London	Michael Heseltine, Jack Cunningham, Charles Kennedy, Charles Moore, Yasmin Alibhai-Brown	
660	15	13 May 1999	Birmingham	Michael Howard, Menzies Campbell, Margaret Beckett, Michael Nazir-Ali, Melanie Phillips	
661	16	20 May 1999	Belfast	John Taylor, Robert McCartney, Mitchel McLaughlin, Bríd Rodgers, Bronagh Hinds	
662	17	27 May 1999	Bath	Jilly Cooper, Liam Fox, Max Hastings, Alun Michael, Ray Michie	
663	18	3 June 1999	Norwich	Francis Maude, John Reid, Matthew Taylor, Petronella Wyatt, Carl Chinn	
664	19	10 June 1999	Birmingham	Jim Davidson, Anne McElvoy, Joyce Quin, Michael Ancram, George Monbiot	
665	20	17 June 1999	Manchester	Charlie Whelan, Gerald Kaufman, Theresa May, Don Foster, Sheila McKechnie	
666	21	24 June 1999	Leeds	Arthur Scargill, Alistair Darling, Nicholas Soames, Sarah Ludford, Decca Aitkenhead	
667	22	1 July 1999 (Note: 1 July 1999: The Leader of the Opposition William Hague was the sole panellist in this special Question Time programme)	Birmingham	William Hague	
668	23	8 July 1999 (Note: 8 July 1999: Tony Blair was the sole panellist in a special Question Time programme)	London	Tony Blair	
669	24	15 July 1999	Belfast	John Hume, Pat Doherty, Ken Maginnis, David Ervine, Albert Reynolds, Michael Ancram	
670	25	23 September 1999	London	Nick Brown, John Maples, Shirley Williams, Mary Ann Sieghart, Michael Bloomberg	
671	26	30 September 1999	Bournemouth	Chris Smith, Ann Widdecombe, Simon Hughes, Ken Cameron, Alice Thomson	
672	27	7 October 1999	Manchester	Robin Cook, Michael Ancram, Menzies Campbell, Janet Street-Porter, Martha Lane Fox	
673	28	14 October 1999 (Note: 14 October 1999: Australian Republic Referendum special.)	Sydney	Bob Hawke, Bill Hayden, Aden Ridgeway, Sophie Panopoulos, Geoffrey Robertson, Simon Heffer	
674	29	21 October 1999	London	Keith Vaz, John Redwood, Jenny Tonge, David Mellor, Beatrix Campbell	
675	30	28 October 1999	Southampton	Theresa May, Diane Abbott, Lembit Öpik, Boris Johnson, Hugh Fearnley-Whittingstall	
676	31	4 November 1999	Glasgow	John Reid, Annabel Goldie, Margo MacDonald, Will Hutton, Sue Townsend	
677	32	11 November 1999	Maidstone	Andrew Smith, Archie Norman, Jean Lambert, Piers Morgan, Gillian duCharme	
678	33	18 November 1999	Durham	Mo Mowlam, David Willetts, Malcolm Bruce, Jonathan Edwards, Deborah Orr	
679	34	25 November 1999	Birmingham	Clare Short, Edward Heath, Germaine Greer, Steve Jones, Ivan Massow	
680	35	2 December 1999	Cardiff	Paul Murphy, Nigel Evans, Helen Mary Jones, Eva Pascoe, David Starkey	
681	36	9 December 1999	Manchester	Roy Hattersley, Julie Kirkbride, Susan Kramer, Phil Redmond, Bruce Anderson	
682	37	16 December 1999	Leeds	Margaret Beckett, Kenneth Clarke, David Steel, Michael Winner, Kristen Lippincott	

=== 2000 ===
#	No. in year	Airdate	Location	Panellists	Notes
683	1	13 January 2000	London	Alistair Darling, Malcolm Rifkind, Rosie Boycott, Andrew Roberts, Heather Rabbatts	
684	2	20 January 2000	Liverpool	Ian McCartney, Steven Norris, Jackie Ballard, John Sentamu, Melanie Phillips	
685	3	27 January 2000	Southampton	Harriet Harman, Francis Maude, Mark Oaten, Cristina Odone, Simon Fanshawe	
686	4	3 February 2000	Brussels	Robin Cook, Iain Duncan Smith, Shirley Williams, Jacques Santer, Jens-Peter Bonde	
687	5	10 February 2000	Birmingham	David Blunkett, Angela Browning, Nick Harvey, Ann Leslie, Malcolm McLaren	
688	6	17 February 2000	London	Michael Heseltine, Roger Scruton, Glenys Kinnock, Ian Hislop	
689	7	24 February 2000	Leeds	Gerald Kaufman, Andrew Lansley, Peter Ridsdale, Ruth Turner, Edwina Currie	
690	8	2 March 2000 (Note: 2 March 2000: London Mayoral Election debate)	London	Ken Livingstone, Frank Dobson, Susan Kramer, Steven Norris, Tim Rice	
691	9	9 March 2000	Nottingham	Michael Meacher, John Redwood, Alan Beith, Miranda Sawyer, Dawn Airey	
692	10	16 March 2000	Truro	Theresa May, Peter Hitchens, Jo Brand, Nick Brown, Matthew Taylor	
693	11	23 March 2000	Maidstone	Margaret Jay, Tom Strathclyde, Simon Hughes, Brian Sewell, Fabiola Arredondo	
694	12	30 March 2000	Belfast	David Trimble, Andrew MacKay, Gerry Kelly, Mark Durkan, Suzanne Moore	
695	13	13 April 2000	Edinburgh	Dennis Canavan, Henry McLeish, Roseanna Cunningham, Ian Rankin, Clarissa Dickson Wright	
696	14	27 April 2000	Newcastle	Geoff Hoon, Norman Lamont, Liz Lynne, Frederick Lawton, Glen Smyth	
697	15	11 May 2000	London	Charles Falconer, Angela Browning, Charles Kennedy, Brian Souter, Boy George	
698	16	18 May 2000	York	Ann Taylor, Bernard Jenkin, A. A. Gill, Emma Nicholson, Steve Cram	
699	17	25 May 2000	Cardiff	Rhodri Morgan, Ann Widdecombe, Dafydd Wigley, Bharti Patel, Boris Johnson	
700	18	1 June 2000	Aberdeen	Alex Salmond, Helen Liddell, Annabel Goldie, Jim Wallace, Mark Pyper	
701	19	8 June 2000	Manchester	Clare Short, Liam Fox, Cristina Odone, Rodney Bickerstaffe, Chris Woodhead	
702	20	15 June 2000	Birmingham	Michael Howard, Nick Brown, Max Hastings, Jackie Ballard, Ann Mallalieu, Emma Inglis	
703	21	22 June 2000	Southampton	Charles Kennedy	
704	22	29 June 2000	Leeds	William Hague	
705	23	6 July 2000	Brighton	Tony Blair	
706	24	21 September 2000	Southampton	Menzies Campbell, Germaine Greer, Clare Short, Andrew Lansley, Vivienne Parry	
707	25	28 September 2000	London	Richard Branson, Piers Morgan, Michael Portillo, Jack Straw, Jenny Tonge	
708	26	5 October 2000	Bournemouth	Michael Ancram, Mary Archer, Malcolm Bruce, Robin Cook, Tamara Ingram	
709	27	12 October 2000	Cardiff	Ron Davies, Helen Mary Jones, David Willetts, Allison Pearson, Nigel Havers	
710	28	19 October 2000	Oxford	Kenneth Clarke, Charles Moore, Ann Taylor, Shirley Williams, Robert Winston	
711	29	26 October 2000	Glasgow	Paddy Ashdown, Ruth Wishart, John Reid, Margaret Ewing, David McLetchie	
712	30	2 November 2000	Norwich	Peter Hain, John Redwood, George Monbiot, Matthew Parris, Shaks Ghosh	
713	31	9 November 2000	London	Diane Abbott, Dominic Lawson, Susan Kramer, Francis Maude, Gary Hart	
714	32	16 November 2000	Blackburn	Geoff Hoon, Navnit Dholakia, Loyd Grossman, Theresa May, Rowan Pelling	
715	33	23 November 2000	Leeds	David Blunkett, Nigel Farage, Janet Street-Porter, Tim Yeo, Benjamin Zephaniah	
716	34	30 November 2000	Birmingham	Paul Boateng, Ann Widdecombe, Will Self, Digby Jones, Sandra Gidley	
717	35	7 December 2000	Manchester	Roy Hattersley, John Bercow, Leon Brittan, Andrew Motion, Suzanna Taverne	
718	36	14 December 2000	Maidstone	Harriet Harman, Iain Duncan Smith, Michael Winner, James Rubin, Matthew Taylor	

=== 2001 ===
#	No. in year	Airdate	Location	Panellists	Notes
719	1	11 January 2001	London	Margaret Beckett, Julie Kirkbride, Nick Harvey, Trevor Kavanagh, David Puttnam	
720	2	18 January 2001	Bristol	Yasmin Alibhai-Brown, Phil de Glanville, Liam Fox, Margaret Jay, Phil Willis	
721	3	25 January 2001	Southampton	Alistair Darling, Rosie Boycott, Tim Rice, Angela Browning, Wayne Hemingway	
722	4	1 February 2001	Carlisle	Tony Benn, John McCririck, Claire Rayner, David Heathcoat-Amory	
723	5	8 February 2001	Lincoln	Charles Clarke, Jackie Ballard, Karan Bilimoria, Andrew Lansley, Andrew Rawnsley	
724	6	15 February 2001	Caernarfon	Cheryl Gillan, Ieuan Wyn Jones, Glenys Kinnock, Robert Swan, Lembit Öpik	
725	7	22 February 2001	Birmingham	Conrad Black, Robin Cook, Francis Maude, Shirley Williams	
726	8	1 March 2001	Stockton-on-Tees	Nick Brown, Muriel Gray, Raj Persaud, David Starkey, Tim Yeo	
727	9	8 March 2001	London	Clare Short, Michael Portillo, Paddy Ashdown, Ken Livingstone, Ruth Lea	
728	10	15 March 2001	Glasgow	Malcolm Bruce, Roseanna Cunningham, Iain Duncan Smith, Helen Liddell, Tommy Sheridan	
729	11	22 March 2001	Exeter	Michael Ancram, Clarissa Dickson Wright, Helene Hayman, Darcus Howe, Matthew Taylor	
730	12	29 March 2001	Leeds	Menzies Campbell, Michael Gove, Alan Milburn, Anna White, Ann Widdecombe	
731	13	4 April 2001	London	Stephen Byers, Simon Hughes, Roger Scruton, Janet Street-Porter, David Willetts	
732	14	26 April 2001	Manchester	Peter Ainsworth, Martin Bell, Charles Falconer, Simon Heffer, Tanni Grey-Thompson	
733	15	3 May 2001	Southampton	Theresa May, Bill Morris, Mark Oaten, Chris Smith, Petronella Wyatt	
734	16	10 May 2001	London	Margaret Beckett, John Redwood, Jenny Tonge, Polly Toynbee, Chris Woodhead	
735	17	15 May 2001 Part 1 (Note: 15 May 2001: Wales Question Time with Plaid Cymru leader Ieuan Wyn Jones. Presented by David Williams.)	Swansea	Ieuan Wyn Jones	
736	18	16 May 2001 Part 2 (Note: 15 May 2001: Scotland Question Time with SNP leader John Swinney. Presented by Anne McKenzie.)	Edinburgh	John Swinney	
737	19	17 May 2001	Newcastle	Charles Kennedy	
738	20	23 May 2001	Manchester	William Hague	
739	21	30 May 2001 (Note: 30 May 2001: During the 2001 General Election campaign, the main political party leaders faced questions from a studio audience.)	Milton Keynes	Tony Blair	
740	22	14 June 2001	Nottingham	Clare Short, David Willetts, Tim Razzall, David Baddiel, Janet Daley	
741	23	21 June 2001	Reading	Boris Johnson, Ken Loach, Zac Goldsmith, Barbara Roche, Prue Leith	
742	24	28 June 2001	Norwich	Patricia Hewitt, Ann Widdecombe, Nick Harvey, Nick Cohen, Joel Edwards	
743	25	5 July 2001 (Note: 5 July 2001: 2001 Conservative Leadership special)	London	Michael Ancram, Kenneth Clarke, David Davis, Iain Duncan Smith, Michael Portillo	
744	26	13 September 2001 (Note: 13 September 2001: Filmed two days after the 11 September 2001 attacks. The BBC received more than 2,000 complaints for its strong anti-American sentiments from audience members.)	London	Paddy Ashdown, Tam Dalyell, Yasmin Alibhai-Brown, Philip Lader	
745	27	20 September 2001	Leeds	Ishtiaq Ahmed, David Davis, Geoff Hoon, Susan Kramer, Bill Emmott	
746	28	27 September 2001	Southampton	Menzies Campbell, Bonnie Greer, Peter Hain, Bernard Jenkin, George Monbiot	
747	29	4 October 2001	London	John Reid, Michael Ancram, Bianca Jagger, Mark Oaten, Amanda Platell	
748	30	11 October 2001	Liverpool	Rosie Boycott, Tim Collins, Simon Heffer, Gerald Kaufman, Jenny Tonge	
749	31	18 October 2001	Cheltenham	Tony Benn, Max Hastings, Donald Anderson, Caroline Spelman, Irvine Welsh	
750	32	25 October 2001	Manchester	Hilary Benn, Eric Forth, Noreena Hertz, Ann Leslie, Matthew Taylor	
751	33	1 November 2001	Glasgow	Haleh Afshar, Thomas Galbraith, Rebecca Hardy, Henry McLeish, Alex Salmond	
752	34	8 November 2001	Leicester	Navnit Dholakia, Peter Hitchens, Denis MacShane, Claire Rayner, David Willetts	
753	35	15 November 2001	Norwich	Richard Branson, Charles Clarke, Marie Colvin, Theresa May, Piers Morgan	
754	36	22 November 2001	London	Charles Kennedy, Robin Cook, Bob Kiley, Caroline Lucas, Oliver Letwin	
755	37	29 November 2001	Belfast	Germaine Greer, Martin McGuinness, Charles Moore, Bríd Rodgers, David Trimble	
756	38	6 December 2001	Bristol	Diane Abbott, Kenneth Clarke, Ed Davey, Melanie Phillips, Will Self	

=== 2002 ===
#	No. in year	Airdate	Location	Panellists	Notes
757	1	10 January 2002	London	Margaret Beckett, Michael Howard, Simon Hughes, Clive Anderson, Tim Martin	
758	2	17 January 2002	Cardiff	Rhodri Morgan, Julie Kirkbride, Dafydd Wigley, Lembit Öpik, Jane Moore	
759	3	24 January 2002	Sunderland	Hilary Armstrong, John Bercow, Muriel Gray, Sandy Millar, Tom Shakespeare	
760	4	31 January 2002	Nottingham	Camila Batmanghelidjh, Alistair Darling, James Mawdsley, Phil Willis, Ann Winterton	
761	5	7 February 2002	Ipswich	Patsy Calton, Janet Daley, Michael Grade, Stephen Twigg, Tim Yeo	
762	6	14 February 2002	Manchester	Ann Widdecombe, Malcolm Bruce, Gwyneth Dunwoody, Ivan Massow, Carol Sarler	
763	7	21 February 2002 (Note: 21 February 2002: Noted for Ian Hislop's attack on Mary Archer.)	Maidstone	Ian Hislop, Mary Archer, Harriet Harman, Nicholas Soames, William Atkinson	
764	8	28 February 2002	Bradford	Estelle Morris, Eric Pickles, Matthew Parris, Abi Ekoku, Joanne Harris	
765	9	7 March 2002	Yeovilton	Ben Bradshaw, John Edmonds, Julie Kirkbride, Shirley Williams, Antony Worrall Thompson	
766	10	14 March 2002	Norwich	Nick Brown, Harry Enfield, Elizabeth Filkin, Liam Fox, Tariq Ali	
767	11	21 March 2002	Harrogate	Tim Collins, Evan Harris, Patrick Moore, Dawn Primarolo, Mary Ann Sieghart	
768	12	28 March 2002	Wolverhampton	Roy Hattersley, John Redwood, Lauren Booth, Julian Fellowes, Tim Razzall	
769	13	18 April 2002	Leeds	Helen Liddell, Michael Howard, Matthew Taylor, Beverly Malone, Rocco Forte	
770	14	25 April 2002	Caernarfon	Peter Ainsworth, Helen Mary Jones, Alun Michael, Sandi Toksvig, Simon Weston	
771	15	9 May 2002	Glasgow	Michael Meacher, Lorraine Kelly, Jacqui Lait, John Swinney, Jim Wallace	
772	16	16 May 2002	London	Peter Hain, Michael Heseltine, Tracey Emin, Melanie Phillips, Richard Rogers, Gurbux Singh	
773	17	23 May 2002	Manchester	Norman Baker, Claire Fox, Damian Green, Loyd Grossman, Clare Short	
774	18	30 May 2002	Isle of Wight	John Fortune, Oona King, Quentin Letts, Steven Norris, Joan Walmsley	
775	19	6 June 2002	Blackpool	Beatrix Campbell, Barry Norman, Peter Ridsdale, Barbara Roche, John Whittingdale	
776	20	13 June 2002	Torquay	Menzies Campbell, Teresa Gorman, Emma Jones, John Maples, Chris Mullin	
777	21	20 June 2002	Stoke-on-Trent	Victor Adebowale, Bruce Anderson, Yvette Cooper, Oliver Letwin, Linda Smith	
778	22	27 June 2002	Birmingham	Iain Duncan Smith	
779	23	4 July 2002	London	John Prescott, Michael Ancram, Alan Beith	
780	24	12 September 2002 (Note: 12 September 2002: Special edition from New York, one year on from the World Trade Centre attacks.)	New York	Geoff Hoon, Ed Koch, Victoria Toensing, Michael Moore, Sheikh Hamza Yusuf	
781	25	19 September 2002	Manchester	Charles Kennedy	
782	26	26 September 2002	London	Mike O'Brien, Bernard Jenkin, Menzies Campbell, Tariq Ali, Rosemary Hollis	
783	27	3 October 2002	Liverpool	John Reid, John Bercow, Susan Kramer, Bob Crow, Patti Boulaye	
784	28	10 October 2002	London	Damian Green, Gus Macdonald, Jackie Stewart, Janet Street-Porter, Joan Walmsley	
785	29	17 October 2002	Coventry	Clive James, Terry Pratchett, Peter Tatchell, Ann Widdecombe, Brian Wilson	
786	30	24 October 2002	Glasgow	Iain Banks, Harriet Harman, Michael Moore, Malcolm Rifkind, Nicola Sturgeon	
787	31	31 October 2002	Leeds	David Davis, Alistair Darling, Jenny Tonge, Minette Marrin, Rodney Bickerstaffe	
788	32	7 November 2002	London	Ben Elton, Dominic Lawson, Mo Mowlam, David Willetts	
789	33	14 November 2002	Norwich	Charles Falconer, Theresa Villiers, Bonnie Greer, Piers Morgan, William Shawcross	
790	34	21 November 2002	Cardiff	Tony Benn, Francis Maude, Matthew Taylor, Janet Ryder, Peter Hitchens	
791	35	28 November 2002	London	Andy Gilchrist, Simon Hughes, Peter Mandelson, Theresa May, Melanie Phillips	
792	36	5 December 2002	Southampton	Paul Boateng, Norman Tebbit, Sandi Toksvig, Tony Robinson, Ruth Lea	
793	37	12 December 2002	Hereford	Jackie Ballard, Quentin Letts, Rhodri Morgan, John O'Farrell, Caroline Spelman	

=== 2003 ===
#	No. in year	Airdate	Location	Panellists	Notes
794	1	9 January 2003	Belfast	Nigel Dodds, Mitchel McLaughlin, Paul Murphy, Bríd Rodgers, David Trimble	
795	2	16 January 2003	London	Jeremy Clarkson, Patricia Hewitt, Michael Howard, Ken Livingstone	
796	3	23 January 2003	Hull	Kenneth Clarke, Robin Cook, Liz Lynne, Amanda Platell, Benjamin Zephaniah	
797	4	30 January 2003	Tamworth	George Galloway, Bernard Jenkin, Mark Oaten, Ann Leslie	
798	5	6 February 2003	Dartmouth	Billy Bragg, Eric Forth, Estelle Morris, Andrew Pierce, Shirley Williams	
799	6	13 February 2003	Caernarfon	Ron Davies, Tim Yeo, Rosie Boycott, Simon Thomas, Simon Heffer	
800	7	20 February 2003	Maidstone	Margaret Hodge, Shailesh Vara, David Baddiel, Vanessa Redgrave, Frederick Forsyth	
801	8	27 February 2003	Manchester	Michael Meacher, Malcolm Bruce, Beatrix Campbell, Tim Collins, Clarissa Dickson-Wright	
802	9	6 March 2003	Bedford	Charles Clarke, Clive Anderson, Alan Duncan, Germaine Greer	
803	10	13 March 2003	Edinburgh	Michael Ancram, Ann Clwyd, Roseanna Cunningham, Simon Hughes, Matthew Parris	
804	11	20 March 2003 (Note: 20 March 2003: Broadcast on the day of the outbreak of the Iraq War .)	London	Peter Hain, William Hague, Shirley Williams, Piers Morgan	
805	12	27 March 2003	London	Yasmin Alibhai-Brown, Geoff Hoon, Charles Kennedy, Oliver Letwin	
806	13	3 April 2003	Burnley	Roy Hattersley, Will Self, Mary Ann Sieghart, Michael Moore, Caroline Spelman	
807	14	9 April 2003	Southampton	Mike O'Brien, David Willetts, Jenny Tonge, Digby Jones, Mark Steel	
808	15	24 April 2003 (Note: 24 April 2003: Special edition from Abu Dhabi which discussed the consequences of the war in Iraq .)	Abu Dhabi	Geoff Hoon, Michael Howard, Benazir Bhutto, James Rubin, Rami Khouri	
809	16	8 May 2003	London	Liam Fox, Hazel Blears, Caroline Lucas, Rod Eddington, Vanessa Feltz	
810	17	15 May 2003	Cardiff	Douglas Alexander, Nigel Evans, Adam Price, Lembit Öpik, Sharron Davies	
811	18	22 May 2003	Leeds	Ian McCartney, Theresa May, Menzies Campbell, Polly Toynbee, Nigel Farage	
812	19	5 June 2003	Lerwick	Alex Salmond, Muriel Gray, Oona King, John Redwood, Jim Wallace	
813	20	12 June 2003	Newcastle	Thomas Galbraith, David Steel, Nick Brown, Janet Street-Porter, Andrew Roberts	
814	21	19 June 2003	Manchester	Peter Hain, David Davis, Tom Shakespeare, Anne Atkins, Decca Aitkenhead	
815	22	26 June 2003	Nottingham	Gwyneth Dunwoody, David Mellor, Trevor Phillips, Sandi Toksvig	
816	23	3 July 2003	London	Valerie Amos, Tim Collins, Tim Razzall, Janet Daley, John O'Farrell	
817	24	25 September 2003	London	Patricia Hewitt, Michael Ancram, Menzies Campbell, Michael Grade	
818	25	2 October 2003	Southampton	Peter Hain, Oliver Letwin, Navnit Dholakia, Mandy Telford, Jane Moore	
819	26	9 October 2003	Morecambe	Alistair Darling, Theresa May, Simon Hughes, Helena Kennedy, Max Hastings	
820	27	16 October 2003	London	Clare Short, David Aaronovitch, Boris Johnson, Susan Kramer, Joel Edwards	
821	28	23 October 2003	Worcester	Harriet Harman, Richard Branson, Alan Duncan, Hilary Wainwright, Julian Lloyd Webber	
822	29	30 October 2003	Manchester	Gerald Kaufman, Piers Morgan, Digby Jones, Tim Collins, Sandra Gidley	
823	30	6 November 2003	Glasgow	Denis MacShane, Tom Strathclyde, John Swinney, Rosie Kane, Edwina Currie	
824	31	13 November 2003	Omagh	David Trimble, Martin McGuinness, Mark Durkan, Nigel Dodds	
825	32	20 November 2003	Borehamwood	Hilary Benn, John Bercow, Jenny Tonge, Vanessa Redgrave, Clive James	
826	33	27 November 2003	Wolverhampton	Charles Falconer, Kenneth Clarke, Joan Walmsley, Simon Heffer, Bonnie Greer	
827	34	4 December 2003	St Austell	Margaret Hodge, Liam Fox, Mark Oaten, William Shawcross, Shami Chakrabarti	
828	35	11 December 2003	Leeds	Charles Clarke, David Davis, Susan Greenfield, Henry Blofeld, Barry Norman	

=== 2004 ===
#	No. in year	Airdate	Location	Panellists	Notes
829	1	8 January 2004	Manchester	Hazel Blears, David Willetts, Ed Davey, Tony Wilson, P. D. James	
830	2	15 January 2004	Slough	David Miliband, George Osborne, Shirley Williams, David Starkey, Claire Fox	
831	3	22 January 2004	Nottingham	Douglas Alexander, Michael Ancram, Matthew Taylor, Norman Jay, Anne Atkins	
832	4	29 January 2004 (Note: 29 January 2004: This edition focused on the publication of the Hutton Report.)	Milton Keynes	Menzies Campbell, Margaret Beckett, Ian Hislop, Oliver Letwin, Janet Daley	
833	5	5 February 2004	Stoke-on-Trent	Peter Hain, Tim Yeo, Jenny Tonge, Rod Liddle, Rosemary Hollis	
834	6	12 February 2004	Portsmouth	Roy Hattersley, Ann Widdecombe, Lembit Öpik, Toby Young, Shirley Conran	
835	7	19 February 2004	Aberystwyth	Ann Clwyd, Laura Anne Jones, Adam Price, Simon Weston, Darcus Howe	
836	8	26 February 2004	Norwich	Ben Bradshaw, Julie Kirkbride, Caroline Lucas, Brian Eno, Peter Hitchens	
837	9	4 March 2004	Stockton-on-Tees	Waheed Alli, Adam Afriyie, Sarah Teather, Melanie Phillips, Wayne Hemingway	
838	10	11 March 2004	Gloucester	Theresa May, Tim Razzall, Beverley Hughes, Bruce Anderson, Alain De Botton	
839	11	18 March 2004	London	Harriet Harman, Malcolm Rifkind, Jeremy Clarkson, Vince Cable, Nick Cohen	
840	12	25 March 2004	Shrewsbury	Tony Benn, John Redwood, John Thurso, Barbara Follett, Ned Temko	
841	13	15 April 2004	Leeds	Chris Bryant, Andrew Lansley, Mark Oaten, Benjamin Zephaniah, Emma Soames	
842	14	22 April 2004	Manchester	Estelle Morris, Andrew Rosindell, David Laws, Amanda Platell, Mick Hucknall	
843	15	29 April 2004	London	Valerie Amos, Norman Tebbit, Simon Thomas, Rhona Cameron, Sheikh Hamza Yusuf	
844	16	6 May 2004	Birmingham	Yvette Cooper, Nicholas Soames, David Steel, John Sentamu, Jane Moore	
845	17	13 May 2004	St Andrews	Alex Salmond, Alistair Darling, Julia Hartley-Brewer, Annabel Goldie, Malcolm Bruce	
846	18	20 May 2004	Sheffield	Patricia Hewitt, Menzies Campbell, Michael Ancram, Jean Lambert, Robert Kilroy-Silk	
847	19	27 May 2004	Newbury	Peter Hain, Julian Fellowes, Janet Street-Porter, Caroline Spelman, Phil Willis	
848	20	3 June 2004	Darlington	Shirley Williams, Liam Fox, Polly Toynbee, Nick Brown, Zac Goldsmith	
849	21	17 June 2004	Cardiff	Caroline Flint, Germaine Greer, David Willetts, Dick Morris, Matthew Taylor	
850	22	24 June 2004	Norwich	Robin Cook, John Bercow, Marc Roche, Harry Enfield, Allison Pearson	
851	23	1 July 2004	Inverness	Douglas Alexander, Bernard Jenkin, Andrew Pierce, Roseanna Cunningham, Kaye Adams	
852	24	8 July 2004 (Note: School's edition)	London	David Lammy, Boris Johnson, Sarah Teather, Jimmy Carr, Kat Fletcher	
—	25	16 September 2004 (25th Anniversary Special)	not applicable	Best of Question Time special edition to mark 25 years of the programme	
853	26	23 September 2004	Borehamwood	Peter Hain, Simon Hughes, Tim Collins, Julia Hartley-Brewer, Richard Dreyfuss	
854	27	30 September 2004	Brighton	Geoff Hoon, Liam Fox, Sandra Gidley, Kwame Kwei-Armah, Ruth Lea	
855	28	7 October 2004	Poole	Patricia Hewitt, David Cameron, Jody Dunn, Nigel Farage, Matthew Parris	
856	29	14 October 2004	Gateshead	Harriet Harman, Michael Gove, Lembit Öpik, Shami Chakrabarti, Christopher Meyer	
857	30	21 October 2004	Oxford	Caroline Flint, Michael Heseltine, Clement Freud, Peter Tatchell, Melanie Phillips	
—	31	28 October 2004 (Note: 28 October 2004: 2004 US Presidential Election special.) (US Presidential Election Special)	Miami	Sidney Blumenthal, David Frum, Richard Littlejohn, Michael Moore, Lida Rodriguez-Taseff	
858	32	4 November 2004	London	Douglas Alexander, Shirley Williams, Caroline Spelman, Ben Elton, Andrew Roberts	
859	33	11 November 2004	Glasgow	Francis Maude, Alex Salmond, Cathy Jamieson, Peter Oborne, Rosie Kane	
860	34	18 November 2004	Norwich	Ben Bradshaw, Tim Yeo, Jenny Tonge, Greg Dyke, Simon Hart	
861	35	25 November 2004	Liverpool	Clare Short, George Osborne, Mark Oaten, James Jones, Linda Smith	
862	36	2 December 2004	Manchester	Hazel Blears, Alan Duncan, Sarah Teather, John Sergeant, Raj Persaud	
863	37	9 December 2004	Plymouth	Ed Balls, Oliver Letwin, Matthew Taylor, Germaine Greer, Robert Kilroy-Silk	

=== 2005 ===
#	No. in year	Airdate	Location	Panellists	Notes
864	1	6 January 2005	Leeds	Clare Short, Alan Duncan, Tim Razzall, Barbara Stocking, David Aaronovitch	
865	2	13 January 2005	Cambridge	Charles Falconer, John Redwood, Caroline Lucas, Armando Iannucci, Ann Leslie	
866	3	20 January 2005	Manchester	Valerie Amos, Michael Ancram, Susan Kramer, Billy Bragg, Jeremy Greenstock	
867	4	27 January 2005	London	Ken Livingstone, Kenneth Clarke, Joan Walmsley, John Rentoul, Trevor Kavanagh	
868	5	3 February 2005 (Note: 3 February 2005: This show included a successful marriage proposal from an audience member to his girlfriend, the programme's first in its 25 year history.)	Derby	Margaret Beckett, Andrew Lansley, David Laws, Yasmin Alibhai-Brown, John Stevens	
869	6	10 February 2005	Belfast	Paul Murphy, Jeffrey Donaldson, Martin McGuinness, David Trimble, Mark Durkan	
870	7	17 February 2005	Slough	Diane Abbott, Nicholas Soames, John Thurso, Johann Hari, Heather Mills McCartney	
871	8	24 February 2005	Warrington	Alun Michael, Theresa May, Norman Baker, Mark Steel, Anne Atkins	
872	9	3 March 2005	London	Charles Clarke, David Davis, Mark Oaten, Shami Chakrabarti	
873	10	10 March 2005 (Note: 10 March 2005: This edition of Question Time was in China as part of the BBC's China Week.)	Shanghai	Liu Jianchao, Chris Patten, David Tang, Long Yongtu, Isabel Hilton	
874	11	17 March 2005	Cardiff	Rhodri Morgan, Julie Kirkbride, Sandi Toksvig, Simon Thomas, Digby Jones	
875	12	31 March 2005	Grimsby	Margaret Hodge, David Cameron, Lembit Öpik, George Galloway, Alice Thomson	
876	13	6 April 2005	Stirling	David Blunkett, Michael Ancram, Jim Wallace, Nicola Sturgeon, Petrina Holdsworth	
877	14	14 April 2005	Birmingham	Ruth Kelly, Liam Fox, Menzies Campbell, David Baddiel, Janet Daley	
878	15	21 April 2005	Durham	Robin Cook, William Hague, Shirley Williams, Jean Lambert	
—	16	28 April 2005 (Note: 28 April 2005: 2005 General Election special) (General Election Special)	London	Tony Blair, Michael Howard, Charles Kennedy	
879	17	12 May 2005	Leeds	Lynne Featherstone, Harriet Harman, Boris Johnson, Jo-Anne Nadler, Andrew Rawnsley	
880	18	19 May 2005	Edinburgh	Anne McGuire, Annabel Goldie, Matthew Taylor, Alex Salmond, George Galloway	
881	19	26 May 2005 (Note: 26 May 2005: French EU constitution referendum special edition.)	Paris	Hervé Mariton, Jacques Myard, Denis MacShane, Liam Fox, Caroline Lucas, Eddie Izzard	
882	20	9 June 2005	Peterborough	David Lammy, John Redwood, Jenny Tonge, Jane Fonda, Peter Hitchens	
883	21	16 June 2005	Caernarfon	Clare Short, Iain Duncan Smith, Helen Mary Jones, Marc Roche, Rod Liddle	
884	22	23 June 2005	Exeter	Peter Hain, Francis Maude, Susan Kramer, Marie O'Riordan, Michael Winner	
885	23	30 June 2005	Manchester	Tony Benn, Justine Greening, Lembit Öpik, June Sarpong, Otis Ferry	
886	24	7 July 2005 (Note: 7 July 2005: Special edition from Johannesburg. This was broadcast on the day of 7 July 2005 attacks in London.)	Johannesburg	Valerie Amos, Edna Adan Ismail, Bianca Jagger, Moeletsi Mbeki, Morgan Tsvangirai	
887	25	22 September 2005	Blackpool	David Miliband, Theresa May, David Laws, Quentin Letts, Bonnie Greer	
888	26	29 September 2005	Brighton	Patricia Hewitt, Kenneth Clarke, Simon Hughes, Janet Street-Porter, Stephen Green	
889	27	6 October 2005	Manchester	Douglas Alexander, Francis Maude, Jo Swinson, Anne McElvoy, David Starkey	
890	28	13 October 2005	Stanley	Ben Bradshaw, David Cameron, Mark Oaten, Muriel Gray, Ann Leslie	
891	29	20 October 2005	Birmingham	Estelle Morris, Andrew Lansley, Greg Dyke, Matthew Parris, Kate Allen	
892	30	27 October 2005	London	Jacqui Smith, Eric Forth, Nick Clegg, Tanni Grey-Thompson, Edwina Currie	
893	31	3 November 2005 (Note: 3 November 2005: 2005 Conservative Leadership special)	Nottingham	David Cameron, David Davis	
894	32	10 November 2005	Carlisle	Geoff Hoon, Caroline Spelman, Chris Huhne, Rhona Cameron, Toby Young	
895	33	17 November 2005	Newbury	Charles Falconer, David Willetts, Shirley Williams, Alice Miles, Derek Laud	
896	34	24 November 2005	Fareham	Roy Hattersley, Alan Duncan, John Thurso, Lorna Fitzsimons, Jane Moore	
897	35	1 December 2005	Glasgow	Margaret Hodge, Annabel Goldie, Nicola Sturgeon, Tom Shakespeare, A. A. Gill	
898	36	8 December 2005	Bristol	Hilary Benn, George Osborne, Jenny Willott, Piers Morgan, Janet Daley	

=== 2006 ===
#	No. in year	Airdate	Location	Panellists	Notes
899	1	12 January 2006	London	Ed Balls, Norman Tebbit, Mark Oaten, Mariella Frostrup, Matthew Parris	
900	2	19 January 2006	Skegness	Chris Bryant, Alan Duncan, Menzies Campbell, Salma Yaqoob, Andrew Green	
901	3	26 January 2006	Basingstoke	Valerie Amos, John Redwood, Simon Hughes, Claire Fox, Zac Goldsmith	
902	4	2 February 2006	Aberystwyth	Rhodri Morgan, Chris Huhne, Leanne Wood, Cheryl Gillan, Adam Rickitt	
903	5	9 February 2006 (Note: 9 February 2006: 2006 Liberal Democrats Leadership debate)	Harlow	Menzies Campbell, Simon Hughes, Chris Huhne	
904	6	16 February 2006	Preston	Peter Hain, Theresa May, Tim Razzall, John Sergeant, Kat Fletcher	
905	7	23 February 2006	Milton Keynes	Alistair Darling, Theresa Villiers, Nigel Farage, Art Malik, Cristina Odone	
906	8	2 March 2006	Telford	Shahid Malik, Jo-Anne Nadler, Will Self, Sarah Teather, Nicholas Winterton	
907	9	9 March 2006	Salisbury	Hazel Blears, Chris Grayling, Jean Lambert, Rod Liddle, Michael Nazir-Ali	
908	10	16 March 2006	Gateshead	Margaret Hodge, David Willetts, Jenny Tonge, Kwame Kwei-Armah, Simon Jenkins	
909	11	23 March 2006	Ipswich	Tony Benn, Boris Johnson, David Laws, Shami Chakrabarti, Digby Jones	
910	12	30 March 2006 (Note: 30 March 2006: Special edition from Moscow in time for the G8 conference in Saint Petersburg.)	Moscow	Garry Kasparov, Douglas Alexander, Grigory Karasin, Andrei Illarionov, Natalya Narochnitskaya, Igor Yurgens	
911	13	20 April 2006	Cambridge	Charles Clarke, George Osborne, Vince Cable, Janet Daley	
912	14	27 April 2006	Coventry	Charles Falconer, David Davis, Ed Davey, Carol Thatcher, Steve Richards	
913	15	4 May 2006	London	Margaret Beckett, William Hague, Julia Goldsworthy, Richard Littlejohn	
914	16	11 May 2006	London	Hazel Blears, Michael Heseltine, Menzies Campbell, Piers Morgan	
915	17	18 May 2006	Canterbury	Harriet Harman, Kenneth Clarke, Simon Hughes, Frederick Forsyth, Helena Kennedy	
916	18	25 May 2006	Hereford	Geoff Hoon, Sayeeda Warsi, Nick Clegg, Oona King, Niall Ferguson	
917	19	1 June 2006	Stockton-on-Tees	Diane Abbott, Michael Gove, Alain de Botton, Mary Ann Sieghart, Michael Winner	
918	20	8 June 2006	Torquay	George Galloway, David Lammy, Liam Fox, Max Hastings, Lynne Featherstone	
919	21	15 June 2006	Sheffield	Charles Falconer, Theresa May, Mark Oaten, Shami Chakrabarti, Derek Dougan	
920	22	22 June 2006	King's Lynn	Alan Johnson, Oliver Letwin, Charles Kennedy, Germaine Greer	
921	23	29 June 2006	Perth	Mike O'Brien, Julie Kirkbride, Nicol Stephen, Alex Salmond, Melanie Phillips	
922	24	6 July 2006	London	Sebastian Coe, Julia Goldsworthy, Richard Madeley, David Miliband, Matt Pollard	
923	25	21 September 2006	Tonbridge	Harriet Harman, Ann Widdecombe, Charles Kennedy, Christopher Meyer, Tariq Ali	
924	26	28 September 2006	Manchester	Jack Straw, Kenneth Clarke, Piers Morgan, Jenny Tonge, Lance Price	
925	27	5 October 2006	Bournemouth	Hazel Blears, Shirley Williams, Oliver Letwin, Ian Hislop, Sandra Howard	
926	28	12 October 2006	Glasgow	Vera Baird, Alan Duncan, Nicola Sturgeon, Tommy Sheridan, Clive Anderson	
927	29	19 October 2006	Preston	Hilary Armstrong, Theresa May, Chris Huhne, Hardeep Singh Kohli, Salma Yaqoob	
928	30	26 October 2006	Exeter	Ben Bradshaw, Michael Ancram, Paddy Ashdown, Pauline Neville-Jones, Janet Street-Porter	
929	31	2 November 2006	London	Charles Clarke, Michael Heseltine, Peter Hitchens, Amanda Platell, Menzies Campbell	
930	32	9 November 2006	Burton upon Trent	Geoff Hoon, Malcolm Rifkind, Rageh Omaar, Catherine Meyer, Jan Berry	
931	33	16 November 2006	Cheltenham	Boris Johnson, Tony McNulty, Jane Bonham Carter, Shappi Khorsandi, Robert Kilroy-Silk	
932	34	23 November 2006	Hartlepool	Denis MacShane, Sayeeda Warsi, Sarah Teather, Esther Rantzen, Polly Toynbee	
933	35	30 November 2006	Belfast	Peter Hain, David Trimble, Martin McGuinness, Mark Durkan, Jeffrey Donaldson	
934	36	7 December 2006	London	Ruth Kelly, David Davis, Martin Amis, Mariella Frostrup, Jeff Randall	

=== 2007 ===
#	No. in year	Airdate	Location	Panellists	Notes
935	1	11 January 2007	Dartford	Charles Falconer, George Osborne, Charles Kennedy, Clare Short, Kelvin MacKenzie	
936	2	18 January 2007	Northampton	Jacqui Smith, David Davis, Nick Clegg, Shami Chakrabarti, Edwina Currie	
937	3	25 January 2007	High Wycombe	Geoff Hoon, Nicholas Soames, Matthew Parris, Deborah Bull, Anne Atkins	
938	4	1 February 2007	Doncaster	Harriet Harman, Andrew Lansley, Mark Oaten, Tristram Hunt, Sarfraz Manzoor	
939	5	8 February 2007	Birmingham	David Miliband, Kenneth Clarke, Simon Hughes, Salma Yaqoob, Frederick Forsyth	
940	6	15 February 2007	London	Roy Hattersley, Norman Tebbit, Julia Goldsworthy, Richard Littlejohn, Janine di Giovanni	
941	7	22 February 2007	Edinburgh	George Foulkes, Nicol Stephen, Alex Salmond, Annabel Goldie, Hardeep Singh Kohli	
942	8	1 March 2007	Colchester	Peter Hain, Francis Maude, Menzies Campbell, Beverley Knight, Cristina Odone	
943	9	8 March 2007	Newcastle	Margaret Hodge, Alan Duncan, Piers Morgan, Siân Berry, Colin Byrne	
944	10	15 March 2007	Newport	Mike O'Brien, Priti Patel, Lembit Öpik, Clare Short, Peter Hitchens	
945	11	22 March 2007 (Note: 22 March 2007: Iraq special)	London	Tony Benn, Benazir Bhutto, John R. Bolton, Des Browne, Liam Fox, Charles Kennedy	
946	12	29 March 2007	Bath	Hazel Blears, Sayeeda Warsi, George Carey, Yvonne Thompson, Nigel Farage	
947	13	19 April 2007	Liverpool	Ed Miliband, Iain Duncan Smith, Jenny Tonge, Jan Ravens, Bruce Anderson	
948	14	26 April 2007	Oxford	Caroline Flint, Douglas Hurd, David Laws, Adam Price, Douglas Murray	
949	15	3 May 2007	London	Tim Collins, William Hague, Patricia Hewitt, Charles Kennedy, Oona King	
950	16	10 May 2007 (Note: 10 May 2007: This edition focused on Tony Blair's legacy after 10 years as Prime Minister.)	London	Peter Mandelson, Menzies Campbell, Kenneth Clarke, Jane Moore	
951	17	17 May 2007	Norwich	Douglas Alexander, Theresa May, Chris Huhne, Jeff Randall, Clemency Burton-Hill	
952	18	24 May 2007	Basingstoke	Alan Johnson, Michael Heseltine, Bob Crow, Martha Lane Fox, Allison Pearson	
953	19	31 May 2007	Stratford-upon-Avon	Roy Hattersley, Caroline Spelman, Sarah Teather, Simon Schama, Greg Dyke	
954	20	7 June 2007	Truro	Tony Benn, Francis Maude, Julia Goldsworthy, Boris Berezovsky, Melanie Phillips	
955	21	14 June 2007 (Note: 14 June 2007: Labour Deputy Leadership special)	London	Peter Hain, Harriet Harman, Alan Johnson, Hazel Blears, Hilary Benn, John Cruddas	
956	22	21 June 2007	Aldershot	Tony McNulty, Boris Johnson, Shirley Williams, Peter Hitchens, Christopher Hitchens	
957	23	28 June 2007	London	Yvette Cooper, Michael Howard, Menzies Campbell, Piers Morgan	
958	24	5 July 2007	London	Charlie Bell, Davina McCall, Ed Miliband, Douglas Murray, Sayeeda Warsi	
959	25	20 September 2007	Brighton	Geoff Hoon, John Redwood, Paddy Ashdown, Janet Street-Porter, Christiane Amanpour	
960	26	27 September 2007	Poole	John Denham, Ed Vaizey, Nick Clegg, Simon Schama, Amanda Platell	
961	27	4 October 2007	London	Ruth Kelly, George Osborne, Menzies Campbell, Ian Hislop	
962	28	11 October 2007 (Note: 11 October 2007: Noted for Kelvin MacKenzie's attack on Scotland. The BBC received 350 complaints and MacKenzie's comments drew widespread criticism in both Scotland and England.)	Cheltenham	Harriet Harman, Caroline Spelman, Simon Hughes, Kelvin MacKenzie, Chuka Umunna	
963	29	18 October 2007	Bradford	Peter Hain, David Davis, Charles Kennedy, Melanie Phillips, Rosie Millard	
964	30	25 October 2007	Oxford	Charles Falconer, Francis Maude, George Galloway, Maria Misra, Fraser Nelson	
965	31	1 November 2007	Swansea	David Lammy, Damian Green, Leanne Wood, Brian Paddick, Edwina Currie	
966	32	8 November 2007	London	Tony McNulty, Michael Heseltine, Vince Cable, Ahdaf Soueif, Douglas Murray	
967	33	15 November 2007 (Note: 15 November 2007: 2007 Liberal Democrats Leadership debate)	Buxton	Chris Huhne, Nick Clegg	
968	34	22 November 2007	Glasgow	Wendy Alexander, Nicola Sturgeon, Annabel Goldie, David Steel, David Aaronovitch	
969	35	29 November 2007	York	Caroline Flint, Alan Duncan, Sarah Teather, Nigel Farage, Paul Myners	
970	36	6 December 2007	Cambridge	Catherine Ashton, Kenneth Clarke, James Rubin, Allison Pearson, Simon Sebag Montefiore	
971	37	13 December 2007	London	Hazel Blears, Chris Patten, Charles Kennedy, Piers Morgan, Kirstie Allsopp	

=== 2008 ===
#	No. in year	Airdate	Location	Panellists	Notes
972	1	17 January 2008	Coventry	Jacqui Smith, Liam Fox, Chris Huhne, Kevin Maguire, Louise Bagshawe	
973	2	24 January 2008	Salisbury	Geoffrey Robinson, Oliver Letwin, David Laws, Alex James, Sarah Sands	
974	3	31 January 2008	London	Shaun Woodward, Kenneth Clarke, Amanda Platell, John Sessions, Bonnie Greer	
975	4	7 February 2008	Liverpool	Andy Burnham, Chris Grayling, Julia Goldsworthy, Shami Chakrabarti, Duncan Bannatyne	
976	5	14 February 2008	Watford	Caroline Flint, Sayeeda Warsi, Stephen Lowe, Clive James, Melanie Phillips	
977	6	21 February 2008	Newcastle	Ruth Kelly, Alan Duncan, Vince Cable, Fraser Nelson, Derek Simpson	
978	7	28 February 2008	Stirling	Annabel Goldie, Nicola Sturgeon, Nicol Stephen, Cathy Jamieson, George Galloway	
979	8	6 March 2008	Manchester	Ed Miliband, David Davis, Shirley Williams, Nigel Farage, Marcus Brigstocke	
980	9	13 March 2008	London	John Denham, Nicola Horlick, Charles Kennedy, George Osborne, Alex Salmond	
981	10	3 April 2008	Birmingham	Douglas Alexander, Theresa May, Sarah Teather, Clare Short, Rod Liddle	
982	11	17 April 2008	Bristol	Harriet Harman, Caroline Spelman, Lembit Öpik, Tony Parsons, Simon Heffer	
983	12	24 April 2008 (Note: 24 April 2008: This edition featured the three main candidates in the London mayoral election race .)	London	Boris Johnson, Ken Livingstone, Brian Paddick	
984	13	1 May 2008	London	William Hague, Paddy Ashdown, Richard Littlejohn, Des Browne, Polly Toynbee	
985	14	8 May 2008	Dorking	James Purnell, Michael Heseltine, Menzies Campbell, Piers Morgan, Rachel Johnson	
986	15	15 May 2008	Cardiff	Alan Johnson, Alan Duncan, Helen Mary Jones, Lauren Booth, Simon Woodroffe	
987	16	22 May 2008	Chester	Hazel Blears, Francis Maude, Simon Hughes, Cristina Odone, Tony Hall	
988	17	29 May 2008	Lincoln	Geoff Hoon, Eric Pickles, Caroline Lucas, Dan Snow, Ruth Lea	
989	18	5 June 2008	Wolverhampton	Peter Hitchens, David Miliband, Vince Cable, Douglas Hurd, Shami Chakrabarti	
990	19	12 June 2008	London	Michael Gove, Shirley Williams, Tony McNulty, June Sarpong, George Pascoe-Watson	
991	20	19 June 2008	Portsmouth	David Davis, Jo Swinson, Nigel Farage, Jerry Springer, Hilary Benn	
992	21	26 June 2008	Bexhill-on-Sea	Yvette Cooper, Pauline Neville-Jones, Chris Huhne, Grayson Perry, Ann Leslie	
993	22	3 July 2008	Musselburgh	David Cairns, Andrew Lansley, Nicola Sturgeon, Emma Nicholson, David Mitchell	
994	23	10 July 2008	London	Iain Duncan Smith, Douglas Alexander, Julia Goldsworthy, Saira Khan, Michael Heaver	
995	24	18 September 2008	Bournemouth	Harriet Harman, Alan Duncan, Lynne Featherstone, Ian Hislop, Simon Wolfson	
996	25	25 September 2008	Manchester	Hazel Blears, Theresa May, Vince Cable, Derek Simpson, Fraser Nelson	
997	26	2 October 2008	Birmingham	Jacqui Smith, Michael Heseltine, Charles Kennedy, Richard Lambert, Janet Street-Porter	
998	27	9 October 2008	London	Kenneth Clarke, John Denham, Chris Huhne, Michael Nazir-Ali, Ruth Lea	
999	28	16 October 2008	Stoke-on-Trent	Geoff Hoon, Dominic Grieve, Julia Goldsworthy, Clare Short, James Caan	
1000	29	23 October 2008 (Note: 23 October 2008: This was the 1000th edition of Question Time.) (Note: Phil Woolas was to appear on the panel but it was feared he would be too controversial.)	Peterborough	Jo Swinson, Roy Hattersley, Sayeeda Warsi, Alex Salmond, Lionel Barber	
—	30	30 October 2008 (Note: 30 October 2008: 2008 US Presidential Election special.) (US Presidential Election Special)	Washington, D.C.	Elizabeth Edwards, Christopher Nixon Cox, Clarence Page, Simon Schama, Cheri Jacobus	
1001	31	6 November 2008	London	Jack Straw, Bonnie Greer, Nigel Farage, Brian Eno, Pauline Neville-Jones	
1002	32	13 November 2008	Dover	Margaret Beckett, Shirley Williams, Jeremy Hunt, Brian Moore, Simon Heffer	
1003	33	20 November 2008	Glasgow	Tavish Scott, Philip Hammond, Nicola Sturgeon, Jim Murphy, Melanie Phillips	
1004	34	27 November 2008	Basildon	Douglas Alexander, George Osborne, Julia Neuberger, Justin King, Adam Price	
1005	35	4 December 2008	Newry	Mark Durkan, Arlene Foster, Alan Johnson, Andrew Lansley, Ken Maginnis, Conor Murphy	
1006	36	11 December 2008	Birkenhead	Nadine Dorries, Jim Knight, Lembit Öpik, Will Self, Esther Rantzen	

=== 2009 ===
#	No. in year	Airdate	Location	Panellists	Notes
1007	1	15 January 2009	Leeds	Chris Grayling, Stephen Pollard, Jenny Tonge, Willie Walsh, Shaun Woodward	
1008	2	22 January 2009	Crawley	Caroline Flint, Liam Fox, David Laws, Christopher Meyer, Janet Daley	
1009	3	29 January 2009	Fort William	Michael Gove, Hardeep Singh Kohli, Nicola Sturgeon, Jo Swinson, Charles Falconer	
1010	4	5 February 2009	Dunstable	Shami Chakrabarti, Nigel Farage, Theresa May, Will Young, Geoff Hoon	
1011	5	12 February 2009	Bath	Liam Byrne, Monty Don, Justine Greening, Salma Yaqoob, Kelvin MacKenzie	
1012	6	19 February 2009	London	Tony McNulty, Michael Heseltine, Piers Morgan, Sarah Teather, Timothy Campbell	
1013	7	26 February 2009	Merthyr Tydfil	Cheryl Gillan, Peter Hain, Elfyn Llwyd, Kirsty Williams, George Pascoe-Watson	
1014	8	5 March 2009	Dudley	Douglas Alexander, Andrew Mitchell, Shirley Williams, Toby Young, Germaine Greer	
1015	9	12 March 2009	Toxteth	Alan Johnson, Susan Kramer, David Mitchell, Charles Moore, Sayeeda Warsi	
1016	10	19 March 2009	London	Fern Britton, Vince Cable, Kenneth Clarke, Tessa Jowell, Douglas Murray	
1017	11	26 March 2009 (Note: 26 March 2009: Noted for Eric Pickles' 'explanation' of his part in the expenses debate.)	Newcastle	Charles Clarke, Ed Davey, Caroline Lucas, Eric Pickles, Michael Winner	
1018	12	23 April 2009	London	Vince Cable, John Denham, Philip Hammond, Ruth Lea, David Starkey	
1019	13	30 April 2009	Great Yarmouth	Norman Baker, Hilary Benn, Andrew Lansley, Frank Skinner, Leanne Wood	
1020	14	7 May 2009	Dunfermline	Bruce Anderson, Nadine Dorries, Iain Gray, David Steel, Nicola Sturgeon	
1021	15	14 May 2009	Grimsby	Margaret Beckett, Benedict Brogan, Menzies Campbell, Steve Easterbrook, Theresa May	
1022	16	21 May 2009 (Note: 21 May 2009: Focussed on the MP expenses scandal. Also, this edition was broadcast at the earlier time of 9:00 pm.)	Salisbury	Yasmin Alibhai-Brown, Marta Andreasen, Martin Bell, Ben Bradshaw, Vince Cable, William Hague	
1023	17	28 May 2009	London	Nigel Farage, Caroline Flint, Pierre-Yves Gerbeau, Jo Swinson, Daniel Hannan, Caroline Lucas	
1024	18	4 June 2009	London	Paddy Ashdown, Liam Fox, Max Hastings, Fiona Phillips, Jan Royall	
1025	19	11 June 2009 (Note: 11 June 2009: Was originally supposed to take place in Llandudno and feature Dom Joly as a panellist.)	Birmingham	Peter Hain, Chris Huhne, Ruth Lea, Derek Simpson, Caroline Spelman	
1026	20	18 June 2009	Sunderland	Charles Falconer, Kenneth Clarke, Ed Davey, Esther Rantzen, Polly Toynbee	
1027	21	25 June 2009 (Note: 25 June 2009: A cat was loose during the recording of this episode and is seen behind Julia Goldsworthy at various times.)	Newquay	Julia Goldsworthy, Pauline Neville-Jones, Jim Knight, Kelvin MacKenzie, Leanne Wood	
1028	22	2 July 2009	Cambridge	Harriet Harman, Iain Duncan Smith, David Laws, Peter Hitchens, Jarvis Cocker	
1029	23	9 July 2009	Manchester	Andy Burnham, Jeremy Hunt, Sarah Teather, Shami Chakrabarti, Suzanne Burlton	
1030	24	16 July 2009	Colchester	Chris Bryant, Margot James, Trisha Goddard, Lionel Barber, Lembit Öpik	
1031	25	23 July 2009	Norwich	Geoff Hoon, Shirley Williams, Sayeeda Warsi, Clive James, George Galloway	
1032	26	24 September 2009	Bournemouth	Harriet Harman, David Laws, Michael Heseltine, Digby Jones, Fraser Nelson	
1033	27	1 October 2009	Brighton	Ben Bradshaw, Theresa May, Charles Kennedy, Dambisa Moyo, David Starkey	
1034	28	8 October 2009	Manchester	Yvette Cooper, George Osborne, Sarah Teather, Stuart Rose, Ian Hislop	
1035	29	15 October 2009	Hull	Alan Johnson, Damian Green, Norman Baker, Nigel Farage, Joan Bakewell	
1036	30	22 October 2009 (Note: 22 October 2009: Notable due to appearance of BNP leader Nick Griffin. Big controversy, and record viewing figures – 7.9 million.)	London	Bonnie Greer, Jack Straw, Nick Griffin, Chris Huhne, Sayeeda Warsi	
1037	31	29 October 2009	Llandudno	Jacqui Smith, Cheryl Gillan, Lembit Öpik, Elfyn Llwyd, John Sergeant	
1038	32	5 November 2009	Reading	Peter Hain, Nick Herbert, Ian Blair, Robert Kilroy-Silk, Natalie Haynes	
1039	33	12 November 2009 (Note: 12 November 2009: Hosted by John Humphrys after David Dimbleby was hit by an animal on his farm.)	Weston-super-Mare	Shaun Woodward, Pauline Neville-Jones, Julia Goldsworthy, Will Self, James Cracknell	Presenter: John Humphrys
1040	34	19 November 2009	Leicester	Phil Woolas, Chris Grayling, Menzies Campbell, Nick Ferrari, Clare Short	
1041	35	26 November 2009	Edinburgh	Charles Falconer, David Davis, Nicola Sturgeon, Melanie Phillips, Marcus Brigstocke	
1042	36	3 December 2009	London	Margaret Beckett, Andrew Lansley, Vince Cable, Kirstie Allsopp, Clive Anderson	
1043	37	10 December 2009	Wootton Bassett	Richard Dannatt, Bill Rammell, William Hague, Paddy Ashdown, Piers Morgan, Salma Yaqoob	

=== 2010 ===
#	No. in year	Airdate	Location	Panellists	Notes
1044	1	14 January 2010	London	Peter Hain, Kenneth Clarke, Chris Huhne, Shappi Khorsandi, Kelvin MacKenzie	
1045	2	21 January 2010	Milton Keynes	Liam Byrne, Caroline Spelman, Sarah Teather, Andrew Roberts, Richard Madeley	
1046	3	28 January 2010	Basildon	Ben Bradshaw, Nigel Lawson, Jenny Tonge, Jane Moore, Douglas Murray	
1047	4	4 February 2010	Coventry	Charles Falconer, Theresa May, Clare Short, George Galloway, Melanie Phillips	
1048	5	11 February 2010	Belfast	Shaun Woodward, Sammy Wilson, Gerry Kelly, David Trimble, Jim Allister, Margaret Ritchie	
1049	6	18 February 2010	Middlesbrough	Roy Hattersley, Rory Stewart, Lynne Featherstone, Ruth Lea, Tom Conti	
1050	7	25 February 2010	Cardiff	Peter Hain, Liam Fox, Elfyn Llwyd, Nigel Farage, Janet Street-Porter	
1051	8	4 March 2010 (Note: 4 March 2010: Episode including Carol Vorderman as one of the panelists. She was slated for her performance, which the New Statesman's James MacIntyre described as "one of the worst by any panel member I have ever seen" because of her "clichéd, shrill, pub-boring, parochial approach" and because "she trotted out sluggish conventional wisdom at every turn".)	London	Andrew Adonis, Boris Johnson, Shirley Williams, Carol Vorderman, Will Self	
1052	9	11 March 2010 (Note: 11 March 2010: The show's first ever women-only audience, this was to mark International Women's Day.)	Dewsbury	Caroline Flint, Justine Greening, Jo Swinson, Monty Don, Kelvin MacKenzie	
1053	10	18 March 2010	Manchester	David Starkey, Margaret Beckett, Andrew Lansley, Charles Kennedy, Caroline Lucas	
1054	11	25 March 2010	Glasgow	Martin Sorrell, Liam Byrne, Alex Salmond, Sayeeda Warsi, Julia Goldsworthy	
1055	12	1 April 2010	Stevenage	Alan Johnson, Kenneth Clarke, Sarah Teather, Richard Littlejohn, Victoria Coren	
1056	13	7 April 2010 (Note: 7 April 2010: Broadcast brought forward a day due to a golfing tournament.)	Woking	David Miliband, Theresa May, Menzies Campbell, Simon Schama, Janet Daley	
1057	14	15 April 2010 (Note: 15 April 2010: Held after the first election debate in Manchester, focusing on domestic policy)	London	Ed Miliband, Michael Gove, David Laws, Nigel Farage, Shami Chakrabarti, John Sergeant	
1058	15	22 April 2010 (Note: 22 April 2010: Held after the second election debate in Bristol, focusing on International Affairs)	London	William Hague, Yvette Cooper, Menzies Campbell, Elfyn Llwyd, Ann Leslie	
1059	16	29 April 2010 (Note: 29 April 2010: Held after the third election debate in Birmingham, focusing on the Economy and Taxes)	Birmingham	Ed Balls, Liam Fox, Vince Cable, Janet Street-Porter, Alex Salmond	
1060	17	13 May 2010 (Note: 13 May 2010: First Question Time following the 2010 general election and the formation of the coalition government between the Conservative Party and the Liberal Democrats.)	London	Michael Heseltine, Charles Falconer, Simon Hughes, Melanie Phillips, Mehdi Hasan	
1061	18	20 May 2010	London	Theresa May, Menzies Campbell, Caroline Flint, Shami Chakrabarti, Douglas Murray	
1062	19	27 May 2010	Gravesend	John Redwood, Susan Kramer, Alastair Campbell, (Note: 27 May 2010: An appearance was expected to be made by a Liberal Democrat member of the Cabinet but would only appear under the condition Alastair Campbell was replaced by a Labour front-bencher. The BBC chose to have Campbell remain a panellist.) Piers Morgan, Max Hastings	
1063	20	3 June 2010	Brecon	David Willetts, Diane Abbott, Leanne Wood, Matthew Parris, Kelvin MacKenzie	
1064	21	10 June 2010	Plymouth	Jeremy Hunt, Ben Bradshaw, Salma Yaqoob, Katie Hopkins, Toby Young	
1065	22	17 June 2010	Witney	Chris Huhne, Peter Hain, Jeffrey Donaldson, Amanda Platell, Helena Kennedy	
1066	23	24 June 2010	London	Vince Cable, Ed Balls, Caroline Lucas, Brent Hoberman, Peter Hitchens	
1067	24	1 July 2010	Ipswich	Iain Duncan Smith, Alan Johnson, Simon Heffer, Mary Beard, Camila Batmanghelidjh	
1068	25	8 July 2010	Edinburgh	Michael Forsyth, Michael Moore, Douglas Alexander, Nicola Sturgeon, Ed Byrne	
1069	26	15 July 2010	Bexhill-on-Sea	Francis Maude, Andy Burnham, George Galloway, Sally Bercow, Nick Ferrari	
1070	27	22 July 2010	Hartlepool	Nigel Farage, Damian Green, Ruth Lea, Bob Crow, Sadiq Khan	
1071	28	16 September 2010 (Note: 16 September 2010: Labour Leadership Special)	London	David Miliband, Ed Miliband, Ed Balls, Andy Burnham, Diane Abbott	
1072	29	23 September 2010	Liverpool	Vince Cable, John Redwood, Caroline Flint, Ian Hislop, Mehdi Hasan	
1073	30	30 September 2010	Manchester	Grant Shapps, (Note: 30 September 2010: Sayeeda Warsi was due to appear, but Shapps took her place at the last minute.) Simon Hughes, Diane Abbott, David Starkey, Brian Cox	
1074	31	7 October 2010	Birmingham	Sayeeda Warsi, Charles Clarke, Susan Kramer, Max Mosley, Rageh Omaar	
1075	32	14 October 2010	Cheltenham	Max Hastings, Tessa Jowell, Maria Misra, David Willetts, Phil Willis	
1076	33	21 October 2010	Middlesbrough	Richard Dannatt, John Denham, Philip Hammond, Caroline Lucas, George Pascoe-Watson, Polly Toynbee	
1077	34	28 October 2010	Glasgow	Chris Bryant, Ed Davey, Hugh Hendry, Simon Schama, Nicola Sturgeon	
1078	35	4 November 2010	Sheffield	Jeremy Browne, Shami Chakrabarti, David Davis, Jon Gaunt, Jack Straw	
1079	36	11 November 2010	London	Sherard Cowper-Coles, Caroline Flint, Clive James, Theresa May, Douglas Murray	
1080	37	18 November 2010	Swansea	Lionel Barber, Nerys Evans, Chris Grayling, Carwyn Jones, Kelvin MacKenzie, Kirsty Williams	
1081	38	25 November 2010	Maidstone	Paddy Ashdown, Kenneth Clarke, Gloria De Piero, Nigel Farage, Kate Mosse	
1082	39	2 December 2010	Coventry	Danny Alexander, Nadine Dorries, Ken Livingstone, Christopher Meyer, John Sergeant	
1083	40	9 December 2010	London	Janet Daley, Liam Fox, Sadiq Khan, Norman Lamb, Aaron Porter	

=== 2011 ===
#	No. in year	Airdate	Location	Panellists	Notes
1084	1	13 January 2011	London	Michael Gove, Charles Kennedy, Diane Abbott, Jeanette Winterson, James Caan	
1085	2	20 January 2011	Burnley	Caroline Spelman, Simon Hughes, Alastair Campbell, George Galloway, Clarke Carlisle	
1086	3	27 January 2011	Cambridge	Chris Huhne, Chuka Umunna, Edwina Currie, Will Self, Katie Hopkins	
1087	4	3 February 2011	Workington	Andy Burnham, Damian Green, Clare Short, Melanie Phillips, Noreena Hertz	
1088	5	10 February 2011	Bristol	Francis Maude, Menzies Campbell, Jacqui Smith, Mehdi Hasan, Douglas Murray	
1089	6	17 February 2011	London	Vince Cable, Yvette Cooper, Michael Heseltine, Nigel Farage, Victoria Barnsley	
1090	7	24 February 2011	Newport	Cheryl Gillan, Peter Hain, Shirley Williams, Elfyn Llwyd, Janet Street-Porter, Fraser Nelson	
1091	8	3 March 2011	Derby	Iain Duncan Smith, Margaret Beckett, Mark Malloch Brown, David Starkey, Liam Halligan	
1092	9	10 March 2011	Edinburgh	Michael Moore, Douglas Alexander, Annabel Goldie, Nicola Sturgeon, Patrick Harvie, Nick Ferrari	
1093	10	17 March 2011	Eastbourne	Sayeeda Warsi, Simon Hughes, Chris Bryant, Caroline Lucas, Kelvin MacKenzie	
1094	11	24 March 2011	London	Danny Alexander, Ken Livingstone, Rory Stewart, Niall Ferguson, Bianca Jagger	
1095	12	31 March 2011	London	Boris Johnson, Sarah Teather, Diane Abbott, Clive Anderson, Mark Serwotka	
1096	13	7 April 2011	Oxford	Jeremy Hunt, Caroline Flint, Jo Swinson, Robert Winston, Simon Callow	
1097	14	14 April 2011	Liverpool	Chris Huhne, Michael Howard, Peter Hain, Alex Salmond, Cristina Odone	
1098	15	5 May 2011	London	Philip Hammond, Andy Burnham, Paddy Ashdown, Yasmin Alibhai-Brown, Douglas Murray, Armando Iannucci	
1099	16	12 May 2011	Sheffield	Vince Cable, David Blunkett, Anna Soubry, James O'Brien, Max Mosley	
1100	17	19 May 2011 (Note: 19 May 2011: Episode after Ken Clarke's controversial views on rape unfolded after an interview on the radio station BBC 5 Live.)	London	Kenneth Clarke, Jack Straw, Shami Chakrabarti, Melanie Phillips	
1101	18	26 May 2011	Exeter	Jeremy Browne, Hilary Benn, Louise Bagshawe, Charlotte Harris, Christopher Meyer	
1102	19	2 June 2011	Wrexham	Stephen Dorrell, Alan Johnson, Elfyn Llwyd, Simon Jenkins, Julia Hartley-Brewer	
1103	20	9 June 2011	Norwich	Andrew Mitchell, Charles Clarke, Jo Swinson, Germaine Greer, Peter Hitchens	
1104	21	16 June 2011	Aberdeen	Michael Moore, Alex Salmond, Michael Forsyth, Margaret Curran, Tom Hunter	
1105	22	23 June 2011	Huddersfield	Norman Baker, John Redwood, Rachel Reeves, Fern Britton, David Mitchell	
1106	23	30 June 2011	Birmingham	Philip Hammond, John Denham, Polly Toynbee, Richard Lambert, Christine Blower	
1107	24	7 July 2011	Basingstoke	Chris Grayling, Douglas Alexander, Shirley Williams, Hugh Grant, Jon Gaunt.	
1108	25	11 August 2011 (Note: 11 August 2011: Scheduled at the last minute following the riots in London and across England.)	London	David Davis, John Prescott, Brian Paddick, Fraser Nelson, Camila Batmanghelidjh, John Sentamu	
1109	26	8 September 2011	London	Liam Fox, David Miliband, Richard Perle, Tariq Ali, Bonnie Greer, Christina Schmid	
1110	27	15 September 2011	Derry	Owen Paterson, Diane Abbott, Nigel Dodds, Martina Anderson, Nicola Horlick	
1111	28	22 September 2011	Birmingham	Vince Cable, Harriet Harman, Priti Patel, Ian Hislop, Justine Roberts	
1112	29	29 September 2011	Liverpool	Grant Shapps, Tim Farron, Caroline Flint, Janet Street-Porter, Peter Oborne	
1113	30	6 October 2011	Manchester	Sayeeda Warsi, Andy Burnham, Charles Kennedy, Jane Moore, Billy Bragg	
1114	31	13 October 2011	London	Andrew Lansley, Ken Livingstone, Sarah Sands, Phil Hammond, Mark Littlewood	
1115	32	20 October 2011	Glasgow	Alistair Carmichael, Margaret Curran, Jacob Rees-Mogg, Brian Cox, Mike Russell	
1116	33	27 October 2011	Winchester	Iain Duncan Smith, Gloria De Piero, Nigel Farage, Jo Swinson, Julian Fellowes	
1117	34	3 November 2011	London	Theresa May, Ed Balls, Shirley Williams, Peter Hitchens, Benjamin Zephaniah	
1118	35	10 November 2011	Newcastle	Michael Moore, Rachel Reeves, Nadine Dorries, Colin Blakemore, Stephen Pollard	
1119	36	17 November 2011	Aberystwyth	Grant Shapps, Chris Bryant, Elin Jones, Will Hutton, Simon Jenkins	
1120	37	24 November 2011	Bath	Chris Huhne, Liz Kendall, Daniel Hannan, Justin King, Jimmy Wales	
1121	38	1 December 2011	London	Kenneth Clarke, Chuka Umunna, Deborah Meaden, David Frum, Mary Bousted	
1122	39	8 December 2011	Stoke-on-Trent	Tristram Hunt, Claire Perry, Constance Briscoe, Simon Wolfson, Mehdi Hasan	

=== 2012 ===
#	No. in year	Airdate	Location	Panellists	Notes
1123	1	12 January 2012	London	Justine Greening, Douglas Alexander, Paddy Ashdown, Nicola Sturgeon, Kelvin MacKenzie	
1124	2	19 January 2012	Shrewsbury	Sayeeda Warsi, Stephen Twigg, Caroline Lucas, Germaine Greer, Charles Moore	
1125	3	26 January 2012	Plymouth	Jeremy Browne, David Lammy, Liz Truss, Mark Steel, Melanie Phillips	
1126	4	2 February 2012	Southport	Alan Duncan, Sadiq Khan, Digby Jones, Phil Redmond, Emma Boon	
1127	5	9 February 2012	London	Philip Hammond, Shirley Williams, Alastair Campbell, Steve Coogan, Ann Leslie	
1128	6	16 February 2012	Nottingham	Kenneth Clarke, John Prescott, Susan Kramer, Julie Meyer, Owen Jones	
1129	7	23 February 2012	Tunbridge Wells	Ed Vaizey, Emily Thornberry, Paul Nuttall, Cristina Odone, Simon Schama	
1130	8	1 March 2012	Dewsbury	John Redwood, Rachel Reeves, Jo Swinson, David Starkey, Clarke Carlisle	
1131	9	8 March 2012	Guildford	Eric Pickles, Caroline Flint, Will Young, Janice Atkinson-Small, Will Self	
1132	10	15 March 2012	St Andrews	Willie Rennie, (Note: 15 March 2012: Last minute replacement for Charles Kennedy who missed his train.) Ruth Davidson, Frank Field, Humza Yousaf, Janet Street-Porter	
1133	11	22 March 2012	Grimsby	Vince Cable, Chuka Umunna, David Davis, Melissa Kite, Marina Lewycka	
1134	12	29 March 2012	Portsmouth	Sarah Teather, Douglas Alexander, Anna Soubry, Simon Jenkins, Alexei Sayle	
1135	13	19 April 2012	Leeds	Sayeeda Warsi, Yvette Cooper, Tim Farron, George Galloway, David Aaronovitch	
1136	14	26 April 2012 (Note: 26 April 2012: This edition was originally to be a London Mayoral Election Debate, but contenders pulled out as the BNP candidate was taking part.)	London	Chris Grayling, Diane Abbott, Simon Hughes, Nigel Farage, Polly Toynbee	
1137	15	3 May 2012	London	Iain Duncan Smith, Harriet Harman, Menzies Campbell, Theo Paphitis, Mark Serwotka	
1138	16	10 May 2012	Manchester	Caroline Spelman, Chris Bryant, Matthew Oakeshott, Mary Beard, Peter Oborne	
1139	17	17 May 2012	Cardiff	Maria Miller, Peter Hain, Leanne Wood, Kelvin MacKenzie, John O'Farrell (Note: 17 May 2012: Last minute replacement for Brian May who was ill.)	
1140	18	24 May 2012	King's Lynn	David Willetts, John Prescott, Caroline Lucas, Griff Rhys Jones, Minette Marrin	
1141	19	31 May 2012	Rugby	Alan Duncan, Stella Creasy, Mark Oaten, Fraser Nelson, Victoria Coren	
1142	20	7 June 2012	Inverness	Charles Kennedy, Johann Lamont, Michael Forsyth, Alex Neil, Melanie Phillips, Alan Cumming	
1143	21	14 June 2012	Stockton-on-Tees	Grant Shapps, Emily Thornberry, Tim Farron, Peter Hitchens, Greg Dyke	
1144	22	21 June 2012	West Bromwich	Kenneth Clarke, Andy Burnham, Len McCluskey, Ruth Lea, Julie White	
1145	23	28 June 2012	Luton	Justine Greening, Tessa Jowell, Paddy Ashdown, Tony Robinson, Terry Smith	
1146	24	5 July 2012	Derby	Ed Davey, Alan Johnson, Louise Mensch, Dominic Lawson, John Lydon	Last episode before the live coverage of the 2012 Summer Olympics and the 2012 Summer Paralympics in London.
1147	25	27 September 2012	Brighton	Danny Alexander, Harriet Harman, Jacob Rees-Mogg, Kirstie Allsopp, Steve Coogan	
1148	26	4 October 2012	Manchester	Kenneth Clarke, Douglas Alexander, Susan Kramer, Willie Walsh, Janet Street-Porter	
1149	27	11 October 2012	Birmingham	Grant Shapps, Caroline Flint, Simon Hughes, Cristina Odone, Benjamin Zephaniah	
1150	28	18 October 2012	Glasgow	Nicola Sturgeon, Ruth Davidson, Margaret Curran, Alan Cochrane, Mark Serwotka	
1151	29	25 October 2012	Slough	Vince Cable, Emily Thornberry, Claire Perry, Paul Nuttall, Mehdi Hasan	
1152	30	1 November 2012	London	David Miliband, Kwasi Kwarteng, Shami Chakrabarti, Jerry Springer, Colleen Graffy	
1153	31	8 November 2012	Bexhill-on-Sea	Damian Green, Chuka Umunna, Shirley Williams, David Blanchflower, Jane Moore	
1154	32	15 November 2012	Corby	Chris Grayling, Harriet Harman, Nigel Farage, Tessa Munt, Moray MacLennan	
1155	33	22 November 2012	London	Iain Duncan Smith, Yvette Cooper, Charles Kennedy, Deborah Meaden, Owen Jones	
1156	34	29 November 2012	Swansea	Patrick McLoughlin, Chris Bryant, Simon Jenkins, Neil Wallis, Charlotte Church	
1157	35	6 December 2012	Liverpool	Francis Maude, Andy Burnham, Tim Farron, Lionel Barber, Leanne Wood	
1158	36	13 December 2012	Bristol	Justine Greening, Stella Creasy, Karan Bilimoria, Will Self, Peter Hitchens	

=== 2013 ===
#	No. in year	Airdate	Location	Panellists	Notes
1159	1	10 January 2013	London	Ed Davey, John Prescott, Nadine Dorries, John Bird, Camilla Cavendish	
1160	2	17 January 2013	Lincoln	Nigel Farage, Mary Beard, Grant Shapps, Caroline Flint, Roland Rudd	
1161	3	24 January 2013	Weymouth	Anna Soubry, Ben Bradshaw, Menzies Campbell, Ian Hislop, Angela Epstein	
1162	4	31 January 2013	Lancaster	Sayeeda Warsi, Alan Johnson, Dom Joly, Zoe Williams, James Delingpole	
1163	5	7 February 2013	Stirling	Michael Moore, Humza Yousaf, Charles Falconer, Mary Macleod, Brian Souter	
1164	6	14 February 2013	Leicester	Maria Miller, Mary Creagh, Susan Kramer, George Galloway, Fraser Nelson	
1165	7	21 February 2013	London	Vince Cable, Diane Abbott, Michael Heseltine, Peter Hitchens, Giles Fraser	
1166	8	28 February 2013	Eastleigh	Jeremy Browne, Angela Eagle, Claire Perry, Neil Hamilton, Ken Loach	
1167	9	7 March 2013	Dover	Kenneth Clarke, Stephen Twigg, Melanie Phillips, Bob Crow, Diane James	
1168	10	14 March 2013	Cardiff	Francis Maude, Chuka Umunna, Kirsty Williams, Leanne Wood, Theo Paphitis	
1169	11	21 March 2013	York	Michael Gove, Emily Thornberry, Natalie Bennett, Mark Littlewood, Anthony Horowitz	
1170	12	11 April 2013	London	Kenneth Clarke, David Blunkett, Menzies Campbell, Polly Toynbee, Charles Moore	
1171	13	18 April 2013	Aldershot	Michael Howard, Caroline Flint, Sarah Teather, Amanda Platell, Griff Rhys Jones	
1172	14	25 April 2013	Worcester	Sajid Javid, Luciana Berger, Simon Hughes, Natalie Bennett, Nigel Farage	
1173	15	2 May 2013	Dartford	Justine Greening, Harriet Harman, David Starkey, Shirley Williams, Victoria Coren	
1174	16	9 May 2013	Coventry	David Davis, Tristram Hunt, Jo Swinson, Germaine Greer, Jerry Hayes	
1175	17	16 May 2013	Ipswich	Philip Hammond, Chris Bryant, Charles Kennedy, Gillian Tett, Peter Bazalgette	
1176	18	23 May 2013	Belfast	Theresa Villiers, Vernon Coaker, Ian Paisley Jr, John O'Dowd, Peter Tatchell, Maajid Nawaz	
1177	19	30 May 2013	London	Anna Soubry, Alan Johnson, Diane James, Julian Fellowes, Mehdi Hasan	
1178	20	6 June 2013	Blackburn	Margot James, Douglas Alexander, Matthew Oakeshott, Salma Yaqoob, A. N. Wilson	
1179	21	13 June 2013	Edinburgh	Ruth Davidson, Anas Sarwar, George Galloway, Angus Robertson, Lesley Riddoch, Nigel Farage	
1180	22	20 June 2013	London	Boris Johnson, Ed Davey, Tessa Jowell, Melanie Phillips, Russell Brand	
1181	23	27 June 2013	Newcastle	David Willetts, Liz Kendall, Simon Hughes, Mark Steel, Jill Kirby	
1182	24	4 July 2013	Basildon	Danny Alexander, Sarah Wollaston, Margaret Hodge, Tony Robinson, Douglas Murray	
1183	25	12 September 2013	London	Justine Greening, Chuka Umunna, Caroline Lucas, David Aaronovitch, Colleen Graffy	
1184	26	19 September 2013	Manchester	Kenneth Clarke, Harriet Harman, Shirley Williams, Laurie Penny, Antony Worrall Thompson	
1185	27	26 September 2013	London	Michael Gove, Douglas Alexander, Patrick O'Flynn, Will Self, Louise Cooper	
1186	28	3 October 2013	Birmingham	Grant Shapps, Yvette Cooper, Kirsty Williams, Mehdi Hasan, Quentin Letts	
1187	29	10 October 2013	Cambridge	Jo Swinson, Diane Abbott, Adam Afriyie, Sarah Churchwell, Matthew Parris	
1188	30	17 October 2013	Basingstoke	Mark Harper, Tristram Hunt, Diane James, Peter Oborne, Bonnie Greer	
1189	31	24 October 2013	Liverpool	Liz Truss, Caroline Flint, Tim Farron, Owen Jones, Peter Hitchens	
1190	32	31 October 2013 (Note: 31 October 2013: Journalist and presenter Paris Lees becomes the first openly transgender panellist to appear on the programme.)	St Austell	Matthew Hancock, Chris Bryant, Jeremy Browne, Harriet Sergeant, Paris Lees	
1191	33	7 November 2013	Boston	Vicky Pryce, Nigel Farage, Emily Thornberry, Anna Soubry, Benjamin Zephaniah	
1192	34	14 November 2013 (Note: 14 November 2013: The venue was changed from an episode scheduled for Brighton after BAE Systems announced the closure of shipyards in Portsmouth.)	Portsmouth	Ed Davey, Stella Creasy, Nigel Lawson, Paul Kenny, Nikki King	
1193	35	21 November 2013 (Note: 21 November 2013: The panel only consisted of 3 guests as Joan Bakewell and Tim Stanley were unable to make it due to transport issues.)	Manchester	Olly Grender, Sadiq Khan, Jeremy Hunt	
1194	36	28 November 2013	Falkirk	Margaret Curran, Eddi Reader, Alistair Carmichael, Nicola Sturgeon, Annabel Goldie, Patrick Harvie	
1195	37	5 December 2013 (Note: 5 December 2013: This episode was moved to a later time slot on BBC Two due to news coverage of the death of Nelson Mandela replacing normal BBC One programming.)	London	Danny Alexander, Rachel Reeves, David Davis, Mary Beard, Nick Ferrari	
1196	38	12 December 2013 (Note: 12 December 2013: This episode was originally scheduled for Swansea, but following the death of Nelson Mandela, it was broadcast from Johannesburg to debate his legacy.)	Johannesburg	Peter Hain, Pik Botha, Lindiwe Zulu, Lindiwe Mazibuko, Eusebius McKaiser, Andile Mngxitama	

=== 2014 ===
#	No. in year	Airdate	Location	Panellists	Notes
1197	1	9 January 2014	London	Norman Baker, Chuka Umunna, Nadine Dorries, Paul Nuttall, Susie Boniface	
1198	2	16 January 2014	Durham	Grant Shapps, Mary Creagh, Tim Farron, John Sentamu, Julia Hartley-Brewer	
1199	3	23 January 2014	Dundee	John Swinney, Ruth Davidson, Jim Sillars, Kezia Dugdale (Note: 23 January 2014: This episode had four panelists in order to have an equal number of people who are for and against Scottish independence.)	
1200	4	30 January 2014	Norwich	Kenneth Clarke, Emily Thornberry, Matthew Oakeshott, (Note: 30 January 2014: Matthew Oakeshott was a last minute replacement for Charles Kennedy.) Kate Smurthwaite, Mark Littlewood	
1201	5	6 February 2014	Gillingham	Matthew Hancock, Tessa Jowell, David Starkey, George Galloway, Alison Wolf	
1202	6	13 February 2014	Scunthorpe	Damian Green, Chris Bryant, Janice Atkinson, Robert Winston, Cristina Odone	
1203	7	20 February 2014	Swindon	Philip Hammond, Liz Kendall, Charles Kennedy, Jeanette Winterson, Roger Scruton	
1204	8	27 February 2014	Newport	Anna Soubry, Rushanara Ali, Elfyn Llwyd, Jay Rayner, Melanie Phillips	
1205	9	6 March 2014 (Note: 6 March 2014: Episode in which an audience member stormed out mid-show after engaging in a heated debate about immigration with panel member David Aaronovitch.)	London	Michael Heseltine, Simon Hughes, Rachel Reeves, David Aaronovitch, Amanda Platell, Aleksander Nekrassov (Note: 6 March 2014: Aleksander Nekrassov, a former Kremlin adviser, was a last minute addition to the panel because of events surrounding the 2014 Crimean crisis.)	
1206	10	13 March 2014	Nottingham	Douglas Alexander, Nick Hewer, Susan Kramer, Nadhim Zahawi, Isabel Oakeshott	
1207	11	20 March 2014	Warrington	Danny Alexander, Andy Burnham, Dominic Raab, Jill Kirby, Val McDermid	
1208	12	27 March 2014	Brighton	Justine Greening, Diane Abbott, Roger Helmer, Mick Hucknall, Simon Wolfson	
1209	13	3 April 2014	Bristol	Vince Cable, Peter Hain, Kwasi Kwarteng, Camilla Cavendish, Julie Bindel	
1210	14	10 April 2014	London	Sajid Javid, Harriet Harman, Kirsty Williams, Billy Bragg, Martin Sorrell	
1211	15	1 May 2014	Leeds	Yvette Cooper, Tim Farron, Suzanne Evans, Conor Burns, Simon Jenkins	
1212	16	8 May 2014	Southampton	Grant Shapps, Chuka Umunna, Shirley Williams, Nigel Farage, Caroline Lucas	
1213	17	15 May 2014	Coventry	Caroline Flint, Paddy Ashdown, Esther McVey, Humza Yousaf, Tim Stanley	
1214	18	22 May 2014	Radlett	Chris Grayling, Tristram Hunt, Jeremy Browne, Neil Hamilton, Jack Monroe, Kirstie Allsopp	
1215	19	29 May 2014	London	David Willetts, Margaret Curran, Louise Bours, Piers Morgan, Joey Barton	
1216	20	5 June 2014	Llandudno	David Jones, Liz Kendall, Hywel Williams, Isabel Hardman, Nev Wilshire	
1217	21	12 June 2014	King's Lynn	Iain Duncan Smith, Chris Bryant, Tessa Munt, Ian Hislop, Salma Yaqoob	
1218	22	26 June 2014	Wolverhampton	Anna Soubry, John Prescott, Paul Nuttall, Maajid Nawaz, Neil Wallis	
1219	23	3 July 2014	London	Alan Johnson, Jo Swinson, Bernard Jenkin, Peter Hitchens, Christine Blower	
1220	24	10 July 2014	Inverness	Ricky Ross, Scott Hastings, Joan Burnie, Alan Savage (Note: 10 July 2014: This was the final edition of Question Time to air before the 2014 Scottish independence referendum, and the first to include no politicians among its panelists.)	
1221	25	25 September 2014	Kelso	Rory Stewart, Emily Thornberry, John Swinney, Lesley Riddoch, Janet Street-Porter	
1222	26	2 October 2014	Northampton	Grant Shapps, Stella Creasy, Julian Huppert, Susie Boniface, Charlie Mullins (Note: 2 October 2014: Julian Huppert was a last minute replacement for Menzies Campbell, who had been scheduled to appear on the panel.)	
1223	27	9 October 2014	Clacton-on-Sea	Eric Pickles, Harriet Harman, Patrick O'Flynn, Malcolm Bruce, Jeanette Winterson	
1224	28	16 October 2014	Newbury	Jeremy Hunt, Angela Eagle, Menzies Campbell, Isabel Oakeshott, Giles Fraser	
1225	29	23 October 2014	Liverpool	Alex Salmond, Caroline Flint, Mark Harper, Louise Bours, Len McCluskey	
1226	30	30 October 2014	Taunton	Owen Paterson, Tristram Hunt, Susan Kramer, Caroline Lucas, Anthony Horowitz	
1227	31	6 November 2014	Middlesbrough	Charles Kennedy, Douglas Alexander, Brandon Lewis, Melanie Phillips, Matt Forde	
1228	32	13 November 2014	Cardiff	Stephen Crabb, Carwyn Jones, Leanne Wood, Kirsty Williams, Rod Liddle	
1229	33	20 November 2014	Birmingham	Kenneth Clarke, Andy Burnham, Douglas Carswell, Yasmin Alibhai-Brown, Dia Chakravarty	
1230	34	27 November 2014	London	Michael Gove, Chuka Umunna, Jo Brand, Amanda Platell, Norman Baker	
1231	35	4 December 2014	Doncaster	Sajid Javid, Yvette Cooper, Shirley Williams, Omid Djalili, Jill Kirby	
1232	36	11 December 2014 (Note: 11 December 2014: Edition in which Russell Brand described Nigel Farage as a "pound shop Enoch Powell", a reference to the politician who made the infamous 1968 Rivers of Blood speech.)	Canterbury	Penny Mordaunt, Mary Creagh, Nigel Farage, Camilla Cavendish, Russell Brand	

=== 2015 ===
#	No. in year	Airdate	Location	Panellists	Notes
1233	1	8 January 2015	Watford	Vince Cable, Liz Kendall, David Davis, Julia Hartley-Brewer, Jimmy Wales	
1234	2	15 January 2015	Lincoln	Anna Soubry, Douglas Alexander, Sal Brinton, Mehdi Hasan, David Starkey	
1235	3	22 January 2015	Eastleigh	Esther McVey, Diane Abbott, Paul Nuttall, Tim Farron, Amol Rajan	
1236	4	29 January 2015	Wrexham	Sajid Javid, Peter Hain, Rhun ap Iorwerth, Kate Maltby, Germaine Greer	
1237	5	5 February 2015 (Note: 5 February 2015: The edition in which Galloway was asked about the rise in antisemitism in the UK, and whether he bore some responsibility for its increase. Galloway's appearance on the programme was criticised ahead of its broadcast by several individuals and groups, including Times of Israel columnist Alex Klineberg, because of Galloway's outspoken views on Israel. Galloway said he was set up, and that chair David Dimbleby apologised to him privately over the tone of the question.)	London	Nicky Morgan, Tristram Hunt, George Galloway, Cristina Odone, Jonathan Freedland	
1238	6	12 February 2015	Norwich	Ed Davey, Chris Bryant, Sarah Wollaston, Suzanne Evans, Armando Iannucci	
1239	7	19 February 2015	Stockton-on-Tees	Michael Heseltine, Nicola Sturgeon, Caroline Flint, Norman Lamb, Duncan Bannatyne	
1240	8	26 February 2015	Telford	Grant Shapps, Rachel Reeves, Mark Reckless, Tessa Munt, Camilla Long	
1241	9	5 March 2015	Glasgow	Danny Alexander, Humza Yousaf, Kezia Dugdale, Ruth Davidson, Toby Young, Val McDermid	
1242	10	12 March 2015	Leeds	Anna Soubry, Lucy Powell, Charles Kennedy, Natalie Bennett, Ian Hislop	
1243	11	19 March 2015	London	Sajid Javid, Chuka Umunna, Shirley Williams, Dia Chakravarty, Will Self	
1244	12	26 March 2015 (Note: 26 March 2015: This edition was broadcast live following the first TV debate between David Cameron and Ed Miliband by Sky and Channel 4 in the Battle for Number 10 debate.)	Manchester	Nicky Morgan, Jim Murphy, Steven Woolfe, Leanne Wood, Janet Street-Porter	
1245	13	2 April 2015	Manchester	Michael Gove, Andy Burnham, Danny Alexander, Yasmin Alibhai-Brown, Peter Hitchens	
1246	14	9 April 2015	Bristol	Liz Truss, Douglas Alexander, Vince Cable, Caroline Lucas, Tim Stanley	
1247	15	16 April 2015	London	Grant Shapps, Yvette Cooper, Angus Robertson, Jo Swinson, Douglas Carswell, Piers Morgan	
1248	16	23 April 2015	West Bromwich	William Hague, Harriet Harman, John Swinney, Paul Nuttall, Natalie Bennett	
—	17	30 April 2015 (Note: 30 April 2015: 2015 General Election Special. Aired at 8 pm, rather than the usual 10:45 pm.) (General Election Special)	Leeds	David Cameron, Ed Miliband, Nick Clegg	
—	18	8 May 2015 (Note: 8 May 2015: Post 2015 General Election Special. Aired at 8:30 pm, rather than the usual 10:45 pm. A UKIP representative was invited to join, but the party was unable to send one.) (General Election Special)	London	Francis Maude, Alastair Campbell, John Swinney, Paddy Ashdown, Julia Hartley-Brewer	
1249	19	14 May 2015	London	Jeremy Hunt, Tristram Hunt, Nigel Farage, Zanny Minton Beddoes, Brian May	
1250	20	21 May 2015	Derby	Nicky Morgan, Stella Creasy, Tim Farron, Owen Jones, Hilary Devey	
1251	21	28 May 2015	Aberdeen	John Nicolson, Ruth Davidson, Charles Falconer, Lesley Riddoch, Alex Massie	
1252	22	4 June 2015	Plymouth	Justine Greening, Mary Creagh, Norman Lamb, Susie Boniface, Jill Kirby	
1253	23	11 June 2015	Gateshead	Matthew Hancock, Chris Bryant, Tasmina Ahmed-Sheikh, Douglas Carswell, Cristina Odone	
1254	24	18 June 2015	High Wycombe	Alex Salmond, David Davis, Caroline Flint, Lionel Barber, Melanie Phillips	
1255	25	25 June 2015	Southampton	Amber Rudd, Andy Burnham, Suzanne Evans, Fraser Nelson, Giles Fraser (Note: 25 June 2015: Giles Fraser was a last minute replacement for Greek finance minister Yanis Varoufakis who was scheduled to be on the panel.)	
1256	26	2 July 2015	Grays	Jeremy Hunt, Jeremy Corbyn, Anne McElvoy, Shappi Khorsandi, Douglas Murray	
1257	27	9 July 2015	Sheffield	Anna Soubry, Chuka Umunna, Tommy Sheppard, Louise Bours, Rachel Johnson	
1258	28	17 September 2015 (Note: 17 September 2015: Episode in which newly appointed Shadow Chancellor John McDonnell apologises for a 2003 speech in which he called for members of the IRA to be honoured for the bombings that brought the British government "to the negotiating table" during the peace process, and for a joke he made in 2010 about wishing he could go back in time to assassinate Margaret Thatcher.)	London	Liz Truss, John McDonnell, Alex Salmond, Tim Stanley, Sandi Toksvig	
1259	29	24 September 2015	Cambridge	Kenneth Clarke, Chris Bryant, Yanis Varoufakis, Suzanne Evans, Julia Hartley-Brewer	
1260	30	1 October 2015	Cardiff	Stephen Crabb, Stephen Kinnock, Leanne Wood, Charles Moore, Charlotte Church	
1261	31	8 October 2015	Leicester	Priti Patel, Lisa Nandy, Tim Farron, Stewart Hosie, Melanie Phillips	
1262	32	15 October 2015 (Note: 15 October 2015: Edition in which audience member Michelle Dorrell berates Secretary of State for Energy and Climate Change Amber Rudd about government plans to cut child tax credits for working families, highlighting concerns about the proposals and forcing the government to defend its position.)	Dover	Amber Rudd, Louise Haigh, Roger Helmer, Rod Liddle, Simon Schama	
1263	33	22 October 2015	Grimsby	Nadhim Zahawi, Alan Johnson, Nigel Farage, Michelle Dewberry, Germaine Greer	
1264	34	29 October 2015	Edinburgh	Annabel Goldie, Keith Brown, Kezia Dugdale, Merryn Somerset Webb, Billy Bragg	
1265	35	5 November 2015	London	Justine Greening, Chuka Umunna, Jenny Jones, Peter Hitchens, Victoria Coren Mitchell	
1266	36	12 November 2015	Stoke-on-Trent	Sajid Javid, Lucy Powell, Paul Nuttall, Stig Abell, Paris Lees	
1267	37	19 November 2015 (Note: 19 November 2015: First edition broadcast after the November 2015 Paris attacks. Was originally scheduled to be held in Belfast, with Theresa Villiers, Peter Hain and Gráinne Maguire on the panel, but was changed to London.)	London	Anna Soubry, Andy Burnham, Natalie Nougayrède, Sir Max Hastings, Mehdi Hasan, Evgeny Lebedev	
1268	38	26 November 2015	Manchester	Matthew Hancock, Ken Livingstone, Kate Andrews, Matt Forde, Pete Wishart	
1269	39	3 December 2015	Birmingham	Nicky Morgan, Diane Abbott, Caroline Lucas, Jill Kirby, Maajid Nawaz	
1270	40	10 December 2015	Bath	Greg Clark, Caroline Flint, Vince Cable, Quentin Letts, Mary Beard	
1271	41	17 December 2015	Slough	Jacob Rees-Mogg, Mark Reckless, Emily Thornberry, Hannah Bardell, Piers Morgan	

=== 2016 ===
#	No. in year	Airdate	Location	Panellists	Notes
1272	1	14 January 2016	London	Nick Boles, Cat Smith, Patrick O'Flynn, Camilla Long, Kelvin MacKenzie	
1273	2	21 January 2016	Belfast	Theresa Villiers, Peter Hain, Nigel Dodds, Declan Kearney, Gráinne Maguire	
1274	3	28 January 2016 (Note: 28 January 2016: This edition was dedicated to Charlie Courtauld, a former editor of the show, who had recently died.)	Stamford	Patrick McLoughlin, Jess Phillips, Angus Robertson, Yasmin Alibhai-Brown, Moray MacLennan	
1275	4	4 February 2016 (Note: 4 February 2016: Paul Nuttall was a replacement for Nigel Farage who got stuck in traffic.)	Bradford	Amber Rudd, Shabana Mahmood, Paul Nuttall, Sal Brinton, Isabel Oakeshott	
1276	5	11 February 2016	Llanelli	Stephen Crabb, Carwyn Jones, Nigel Farage, Leanne Wood, Romesh Ranganathan	
1277	6	18 February 2016	Stratford-upon-Avon	Justine Greening, Lisa Nandy, John Nicolson, June Sarpong, Theo Paphitis	
1278	7	25 February 2016	Poole	Liz Truss, Diane Abbott, Julia Hartley-Brewer, Giles Fraser, Julian Fellowes	
1279	8	3 March 2016	Liverpool	Dominic Raab, John McDonnell, Louise Bours, Zoe Williams, Jermaine Jenas	
1280	9	10 March 2016	Dundee	Ruth Davidson, John Swinney, Jenny Marra, Willie Rennie, Patrick Harvie, Tim Stanley	
1281	10	17 March 2016	Chelmsford	Nicky Morgan, Emily Thornberry, Tasmina Ahmed-Sheikh, Roger Helmer, Mark Littlewood	
1282	11	7 April 2016	London	Anna Soubry, Chris Bryant, Douglas Carswell, Ruth Lea, Irvine Welsh	
1283	12	14 April 2016	Doncaster	Daniel Hannan, Owen Smith, Angus Robertson, Jenny Jones, Dia Chakravarty	
1284	13	21 April 2016	Exeter	Liam Fox, Paddy Ashdown, Kate Hoey, Leanne Wood, Tim Martin	
1285	14	28 April 2016	Hull	Greg Clark, Andy Burnham, Alex Salmond, Jill Kirby, Paul Marshall	
1286	15	5 May 2016	Manchester	Nigel Lawson, Lisa Nandy, Michael O'Leary, Isabel Oakeshott, Benjamin Zephaniah	
1287	16	12 May 2016	Aberdeen	David Mundell, Humza Yousaf, Kezia Dugdale, Jim Sillars, Merryn Somerset Webb	
1288	17	19 May 2016	Walsall	Amber Rudd, Yvette Cooper, Tim Farron, Paul Nuttall, Paul Mason	
1289	18	26 May 2016	Ipswich	Ed Miliband, David Davis, Caroline Lucas, Steve Hilton, Dreda Say Mitchell	
1290	19	2 June 2016	Cardiff	Liz Truss, Frank Field, Neil Hamilton, Liz Saville Roberts, Owen Jones	
1291	20	9 June 2016	Folkestone	Chris Grayling, Hilary Benn, Nigel Farage, Allison Pearson, Eddie Izzard	
1292	21	15 June 2016 (Note: 15 June 2016: Michael Gove was the sole panelist in a special edition of Question Time where he made the case for the UK to leave the EU. Was broadcast at the earlier time of 18:45.)	Nottingham	Michael Gove	
1293	22	19 June 2016 (Note: 19 June 2016: David Cameron was the sole panelist in a special edition of Question Time where he made the case for the UK to remain in the EU. Was broadcast at the earlier time of 18:45.)	Milton Keynes	David Cameron	
1294	23	26 June 2016 (Note: 26 June 2016: Post-Brexit special, the panel was divided 50/50 on those who supported Brexit and those who supported Remain. Was broadcast live at the earlier time of 18:30.)	Birmingham	Dominic Raab, Paul Nuttall, Giles Fraser, Anna Soubry, Alex Salmond, Diane Abbott	
1295	24	30 June 2016	Preston	Sam Gyimah, Emily Thornberry, Douglas Carswell, Melanie Phillips, Russell Kane	
1296	25	7 July 2016	Brighton	Charles Falconer, Tom Tugendhat, Sal Brinton, George Galloway, Ian Hislop	
1297	26	8 September 2016 (Note: 8 September 2016: 2016 Labour Leadership special. Was broadcast at the earlier time of 21:00.)	Manchester	Jeremy Corbyn, Owen Smith	
1298	27	15 September 2016	Salisbury	Anna Soubry, John McDonnell, Joanna Cherry, Quentin Letts, Alastair Campbell	
1299	28	22 September 2016	Sutton Coldfield	Jacob Rees-Mogg, Liz Kendall, Caroline Lucas, Norman Lamb, Julia Hartley-Brewer	
1300	29	29 September 2016	Boston	Priti Patel, Richard Burgon, Steven Woolfe, Bonnie Greer, Rod Liddle (Note: 29 September 2016: Richard Burgon was a last minute replacement for Emily Thornberry, after the latter flew to Israel to attend the funeral of former Israeli President Shimon Peres, who had died the previous day.)	
1301	30	6 October 2016	Neath	Alun Cairns, Chuka Umunna, Leanne Wood, Neil Hamilton, Andy Parsons	
1302	31	13 October 2016	London	Damian Green, Emily Thornberry, Alex Salmond, Isabel Oakeshott, Amol Rajan	
1303	32	20 October 2016	Hartlepool	Kenneth Clarke, Angela Rayner, Lisa Duffy, Yanis Varoufakis, Conrad Black	
1304	33	27 October 2016	Gloucester	Greg Clark, Keir Starmer, Sal Brinton, Dia Chakravarty, Ken Loach	
1305	34	3 November 2016	Watford	Sajid Javid, Lisa Nandy, Zanny Minton Beddoes, Charlie Wolf, Huey Morgan (Note: 3 November 2016: Businessman and UKIP donor Arron Banks was originally scheduled to be on the panel, but was replaced by Charlie Wolf.)	
1306	35	10 November 2016 (Note: 10 November 2016: First edition broadcast after the 2016 United States presidential election. All of the questions focused on Donald Trump winning and what it would mean internationally.)	Southend-on-Sea	Dominic Raab, Yvette Cooper, Tasmina Ahmed-Sheikh, Jan Halper-Hayes, Sarah Churchwell	
1307	36	17 November 2016	Stirling	Kwasi Kwarteng, Chris Bryant, John Nicolson, Merryn Somerset Webb, Cat Boyd	
1308	37	24 November 2016	London	David Gauke, Chris Leslie, Tim Farron, Mariana Mazzucato, John Timpson (Note: 24 November 2016: Shadow Chancellor John McDonnell was scheduled to make an appearance, but he was taken ill so he was replaced by Chris Leslie.)	
1309	38	1 December 2016	Wakefield	Ruth Davidson, Alan Johnson, Tim Stanley, Laurie Penny, Richard Tice	
1310	39	8 December 2016	Maidenhead	Sarah Wollaston, Richard Burgon, Nigel Farage, Will Self, Louise Mensch	

=== 2017 ===
#	No. in year	Airdate	Location	Panellists	Notes
1311	1	12 January 2017	Solihull	David Lidington, Gisela Stuart, Paul Mason, Monica Grady, Arron Banks	
1312	2	19 January 2017	Peterborough	Chris Grayling, Emily Thornberry, Alistair Carmichael, Piers Morgan, Lionel Shriver	
1313	3	26 January 2017	London	Diane Abbott, James Cleverly, Angus Robertson, Susie Boniface, Geoff Norcott	
1314	4	2 February 2017	Wallasey	Patrick McLoughlin, Rebecca Long-Bailey, Maajid Nawaz, Nick Hewer, Laura Perrins	
1315	5	9 February 2017	Torquay	Claire Perry, Owen Smith, Peter Whittle, Billy Bragg, Ann Widdecombe	
1316	6	16 February 2017	Glasgow	David Mundell, Shami Chakrabarti, John Swinney, Val McDermid, Mark Littlewood	
1317	7	23 February 2017	Stoke-on-Trent	Justine Greening, Angela Rayner, Douglas Carswell, Peter Coates, Isabel Oakeshott	
1318	8	2 March 2017	Bedford	Liz Truss, Dawn Butler, Menzies Campbell, Peter Hitchens, Jamie MacColl	
1319	9	9 March 2017	Sunderland	Karen Bradley, Kezia Dugdale, Tasmina Ahmed-Sheikh, Polly Toynbee, Fraser Nelson (Note: 9 March 2017: Kezia Dugdale was a last minute replacement for John McDonnell, who could not make it due to missing a flight.)	
1320	10	16 March 2017	Bognor Regis	Jacob Rees-Mogg, Angela Eagle, Joanna Cherry, Matthew Parris, Tim Martin	
1321	11	23 March 2017	Bangor	Brandon Lewis, Nia Griffith, Leanne Wood, Giles Fraser, Hugo Rifkind	
1322	12	27 March 2017 (Note: 27 March 2017: Britain after Brexit special.)	Birmingham	David Davis, Keir Starmer, Nick Clegg, Suzanne Evans, Melanie Phillips, Alex Salmond	
1323	13	30 March 2017	Carlisle	Ruth Davidson, Lisa Nandy, Paul Nuttall, Len McCluskey, Kate Andrews	
1324	14	6 April 2017	Gillingham	Suella Fernandes, Diane Abbott, Tim Farron, Jonathan Bartley, Gerard Coyne, Michelle Dewberry	
1325	15	27 April 2017	Oxford	Damian Green, Clive Lewis, Jo Swinson, Stephen Gethins, Camilla Cavendish	
1326	16	4 May 2017	Manchester	David Davis, Rebecca Long-Bailey, Paul Nuttall, Leanne Wood, Juergen Maier	
1327	17	11 May 2017	Edinburgh	Ben Wallace, Joanna Cherry, Emily Thornberry, Merryn Somerset Webb, David Hayman	
1328	18	18 May 2017	Norwich	Priti Patel, Angela Rayner, Vince Cable, Jonathan Bartley, Charles Moore	
1329	19	25 May 2017 (Note: 25 May 2017: This edition was due to be broadcast from Belfast but was moved to Salford following the Manchester Arena bombing.)	Manchester	Amber Rudd, Andy Burnham, Colin Parry, Sara Khan, Nazir Afzal	
1330	20	1 June 2017	London	David Davis, Barry Gardiner, Nick Clegg, Suzanne Evans, Angus Robertson	
—	21	2 June 2017 (Note: 2 June 2017: 2017 General Election Specials. Broadcast at the earlier time of 8:30 pm)	York	Theresa May, Jeremy Corbyn	Leaders' General Election Special
—	22	5 June 2017 (Note: 5 June 2017: Leader's Special (Election 2017) Was due to be broadcast at 5:55 pm on 4 June but was postponed for a BBC News special following the 2017 London Bridge attack – the programme was moved to 9:00 pm the next day. Was presented by Nick Robinson instead of David Dimbleby.)	Edinburgh	Tim Farron, Nicola Sturgeon	Leaders' General Election Special
—	23	9 June 2017 (Note: 9 June 2017: Post 2017 General Election Special.)	London	Chris Grayling, Shami Chakrabarti, Isabel Oakeshott, Armando Iannucci, Alastair Campbell	Post General Election Special
1331	24	15 June 2017	Coventry	Tobias Ellwood, Emily Thornberry, Norman Lamb, Laura Perrins, Rob Delaney	
1332	25	22 June 2017 (Note: 22 June 2017: Believed to be the first time a member of the audience has been told to leave the programme for repeatedly heckling the panel.)	Plymouth	David Lidington, Jon Ashworth, Ian Blackford, Peter Oborne, Gina Miller	
1333	26	29 June 2017	Hastings	Liam Fox, Stella Creasy, Zanny Minton Beddoes, Kerry-Anne Mendoza, Nick Ferrari	
1334	27	6 July 2017	Burton upon Trent	Jacob Rees-Mogg, Richard Burgon, Caroline Lucas, Susie Boniface, Craig Oliver	
1335	28	14 September 2017	London	David Gauke, Dawn Butler, Kirsty Blackman, Julia Hartley-Brewer, Will Self	
1336	29	21 September 2017	Bridgwater	Vince Cable, Kwasi Kwarteng, Jess Phillips, Dia Chakravarty, Paul Mason	
1337	30	28 September 2017	Wolverhampton	Karen Bradley, Ian Lavery, Peter Hitchens, Richard Tice, Ayesha Hazarika	
1338	31	5 October 2017	Manchester	Damian Green, Angela Rayner, Michelle Dewberry, Sarah Churchwell, Fraser Nelson	
1339	32	12 October 2017	Belfast	Theresa Villiers, Owen Smith, Simon Hamilton, John O'Dowd, Jonathan Lynn	
1340	33	19 October 2017	Dunstable	Chris Grayling, Lisa Nandy, Sal Brinton, Simon Wolfson, Richard Coles	
1341	34	26 October 2017	Portsmouth	Jacob Rees-Mogg, Shami Chakrabarti, Alex Salmond, Camilla Tominey, Germaine Greer	
1342	35	2 November 2017	Kilmarnock	Daniel Hannan, Jeane Freeman, Kezia Dugdale, Anne McElvoy, Owen Jones	
1343	36	9 November 2017	London	Justine Greening, Stella Creasy, Kirstie Allsopp, Aditya Chakrabortty, Charles Moore	
1344	37	16 November 2017	Newcastle	Emily Thornberry, Nadhim Zahawi, Tim Farron, Rod Liddle, Val McDermid	
1345	38	23 November 2017 (Note: 23 November 2017: This edition was only 40 minutes long as an audience member fell ill, and was unable to be safely recovered.)	Colchester	Greg Clark, Diane Abbott, Bernard Hogan-Howe, Dreda Say Mitchell, Stuart Rose	
1346	39	30 November 2017	Scarborough	Chuka Umunna, Sam Gyimah, Henry Bolton, Sarah Baxter, Yanis Varoufakis	
1347	40	7 December 2017	Swansea	Bernard Jenkin, Owen Smith, Liz Saville Roberts, Kate Andrews, Richard Bacon	
1348	41	14 December 2017	Barnsley	Nicky Morgan, Rebecca Long-Bailey, Robert Winston, Isabel Oakeshott, Geoff Norcott	

=== 2018 ===
#	No. in year	Airdate	Location	Panellists	Notes
1349	1	11 January 2018	London	Dominic Raab, Dawn Butler, Gina Miller, Nish Kumar, Piers Morgan	
1350	2	18 January 2018	Hereford	Margot James, Andy Burnham, Howard Davies, Munira Mirza, Dustin Lance Black	
1351	3	25 January 2018	Dumfries	Michael Forsyth, Chris Williamson, Fiona Hyslop, Maggie Chapman, Peter Oborne	
1352	4	1 February 2018	Grantham	Justine Greening, John Mann, Jo Swinson, Miatta Fahnbulleh, Tim Stanley	
1353	5	8 February 2018	Darlington	Claire Perry, Emily Thornberry, Richard Tice, Rachel Sylvester, Terry Christian	
1354	6	15 February 2018	Yeovil	Theresa Villiers, David Lammy, Richard Walker, Faiza Shaheen, Camilla Cavendish	
1355	7	22 February 2018	Uttoxeter	Brandon Lewis, John Prescott, Camilla Tominey, Ash Sarkar, Juergen Maier	
1356	8	1 March 2018	Blackpool	Kenneth Clarke, Owen Smith, Nigel Farage, Michelle Dewberry, Radzi Chinyanganya	
1357	9	8 March 2018	London	Liam Fox, Laura Pidcock, Roma Agrawal, George the Poet, Prue Leith	
1358	10	15 March 2018	Dover	Chris Grayling, Keir Starmer, Mairead McGuinness, Afshin Rattansi, Brian Cox	
1359	11	22 March 2018	Leeds	James Cleverly, Shami Chakrabarti, Stewart McDonald, Paris Lees, Peter Hitchens	
1360	12	12 April 2018	Liverpool	Jo Johnson, Barry Gardiner, Jonathan Freedland, Kate Andrews, Nicola Horlick	
1361	13	19 April 2018	Chesterfield	Liz Truss, Emily Thornberry, Vince Cable, Nesrine Malik, Iain Dale	
1362	14	26 April 2018	Bury St Edmunds	Matthew Hancock, Diane Abbott, Caroline Lucas, Jen Robinson, Simon Evans	
1363	15	3 May 2018	St Albans	David Lidington, Chi Onwurah, Matt Forde, Camilla Tominey, Martin Lewis	
1364	16	10 May 2018	Kettering	Esther McVey, Chuka Umunna, Alejandro Agag, Chloe Westley, Akala	
1365	17	17 May 2018	London	Dominic Raab, Diane Abbott, Bernard Hogan-Howe, Camilla Cavendish, Aditya Chakrabortty	
1366	18	24 May 2018	Worthing	Anna Soubry, Anneliese Dodds, Sarah Churchwell, Dominic Lawson, Lionel Shriver	
1367	19	31 May 2018	Perth	Kwasi Kwarteng, Caroline Flint, Kate Forbes, Darren McGarvey, Brian Souter	
1368	20	7 June 2018	Reading	Damian Hinds, Shami Chakrabarti, Richard Reed, Alison Phillips, Richard Madeley	
1369	21	14 June 2018	Caernarfon	Dominic Grieve, John Mann, Leanne Wood, Isabel Oakeshott, Matthew Wright	
1370	22	21 June 2018	Birmingham	Damian Green, Jon Ashworth, Afua Hirsch, Tim Martin, Ella Whelan	
1371	23	28 June 2018	Exeter	Suella Braverman, Clive Lewis, Johan Eliasch, Helen Lewis, Janet Street-Porter	
1372	24	5 July 2018	King's Lynn	Priti Patel, Lisa Nandy, Ian Blackford, Matthew Parris, Carolyn Radford	
1373	25	12 July 2018	Dartford	Claire Perry, Barry Gardiner, Gina Miller, Charles Moore, Piers Morgan	
1374	26	13 September 2018	Banbury	Rory Stewart, Chris Leslie, Julia Hartley-Brewer, Faiza Shaheen, Theo Paphitis	
1375	27	20 September 2018	Dewsbury	Chris Skidmore, Barry Gardiner, Vince Cable, Camilla Tominey, Nazir Afzal	
1376	28	27 September 2018	Bishop Auckland	Jacob Rees-Mogg, Ian Lavery, Polly Mackenzie, Ayesha Hazarika, Rod Liddle	
1377	29	4 October 2018	London	David Gauke, Emily Thornberry, George the Poet, Isabel Oakeshott, Claude Littner	
1378	30	11 October 2018	Edinburgh	Ross Thomson, Kezia Dugdale, Mike Russell, Fraser Nelson, Val McDermid	
1379	31	18 October 2018	Guildford	James Cleverly, Keir Starmer, Zanny Minton Beddoes, Michael Dobbs, Nish Kumar	
1380	32	25 October 2018	Barrow-in-Furness	Andrea Jenkyns, Lisa Nandy, Hannah Bardell, Sebastian Payne, Paul Mason	
1381	33	1 November 2018	Clacton-on-Sea	Giles Watling, Andy McDonald, Anne McElvoy, Kate Andrews, Shappi Khorsandi (Note: 1 November 2018: Giles Watling was a last-minute replacement for Liz Truss after her train was delayed.)	
1382	34	8 November 2018	London	Kwasi Kwarteng, Diane Abbott, Mairead McGuinness, David Aaronovitch, Jordan Peterson	
1383	35	15 November 2018	Milford Haven	Claire Perry, Barry Gardiner, Liz Saville Roberts, Mark Serwotka, Tim Stanley	
1384	36	22 November 2018	Cannock	Karen Bradley, Clive Lewis, Richard Walker, Trevor Phillips, Julia Hartley-Brewer	
1385	37	29 November 2018	Penzance	Nadhim Zahawi, Rebecca Long-Bailey, Layla Moran, Tim Martin, Benjamin Zephaniah	
1386	38	6 December 2018	Bishop's Stortford	James Brokenshire, Shami Chakrabarti, Ian Blackford, Jill Rutter, Charles Moore	
1387	39	13 December 2018 (Note: 13 December 2018:This was the last Question Time chaired by David Dimbleby.)	London	David Davis, Nicky Morgan, Angela Rayner, Caroline Lucas, Jo Brand	

=== 2019 ===
#	No. in year	Airdate	Location	Panellists	Notes
1388	1	10 January 2019 (Note: 10 January 2019: This was the first edition hosted by Fiona Bruce.)	London	James Cleverly, Emily Thornberry, Jo Swinson, Melanie Phillips, Nish Kumar	
1389	2	17 January 2019	Derby	Rory Stewart, Diane Abbott, Kirsty Blackman, Anand Menon, Isabel Oakeshott	
1390	3	24 January 2019	Winchester	Suella Braverman, John Healey, Sonia Sodha, Iain Anderson, Nick Ferrari	
1391	4	31 January 2019	Lincoln	Helen Whately, Richard Burgon, Juergen Maier, Camilla Tominey, Gina Miller	
1392	5	7 February 2019	Motherwell	Michael Forsyth, Anneliese Dodds, Fiona Hyslop, Hugo Rifkind, Eunice Olumide	
1393	6	14 February 2019	Aylesbury	Jacob Rees-Mogg, Lisa Nandy, Grace Blakeley, Geoff Norcott, Jimmy Wales	
1394	7	21 February 2019	Chester	Mel Stride, Andy McDonald, Chris Leslie, Ella Whelan, John Barnes	
1395	8	28 February 2019	London	Nadhim Zahawi, Barry Gardiner, Layla Moran, Lionel Shriver, Henning Wehn	
1396	9	7 March 2019	Dudley	Dominic Raab, Margaret Beckett, Iain Martin, Javed Khan, Owen Jones	
1397	10	14 March 2019	London	James Cleverly, Clive Lewis, Ian Blackford, Catherine Barnard, Julia Hartley-Brewer	
1398	11	21 March 2019	Belfast	Tobias Ellwood, Nick Thomas-Symonds, Jeffrey Donaldson, John O'Dowd, Polly Mackenzie	
1399	12	28 March 2019	Sheffield	Damian Hinds, Jenny Chapman, Simon Wolfson, Merryn Somerset Webb, Yanis Varoufakis	
1400	13	4 April 2019	London	Jeremy Wright, David Lammy, Mairead McGuinness, Charles Moore, Ash Sarkar	
1401	14	25 April 2019	Nottingham	Victoria Atkins, Jon Ashworth, Vince Cable, Caroline Lucas, John Rhys-Davies	
1402	15	2 May 2019	Warrington	Kenneth Clarke, Emily Thornberry, Kate Andrews, Sonia Sodha, Simon Evans	
1403	16	9 May 2019	Northampton	Amber Rudd, Jonathan Reynolds, Anna Soubry, Nigel Farage, John Mills	
1404	17	16 May 2019	Elgin	Bim Afolami, Richard Leonard, John Swinney, Christine Jardine, Eilidh Douglas	
1405	18	23 May 2019	Frome	Damian Green, Tracy Brabin, Camilla Cavendish, Miatta Fahnbulleh, Simon Jordan	
1406	19	30 May 2019 (Note: 30 May 2019: While appearing on this edition, the Liberal Democrats deputy leader Jo Swinson confirms that she will put her name forward in the party's forthcoming leadership election.)	Epsom	Rory Stewart, Barry Gardiner, Jo Swinson, Alex Phillips, Steven Pinker	
1407	20	6 June 2019	Thetford	Nicky Morgan, Anneliese Dodds, Drew Hendry, Alison Phillips, Piers Morgan	
1408	21	13 June 2019	Brecon	Theresa Villiers, Stephen Kinnock, Adam Price, Mark Reckless, Francesca Martinez	
1409	22	20 June 2019	London	Kwasi Kwarteng, Margot James, Laura Pidcock, Ed Davey, Tim Martin	
1410	23	27 June 2019	Halifax	Liz Truss, Caroline Flint, Richard Walker, Tom Newton Dunn, Ayesha Hazarika	
1411	24	4 July 2019	Chichester	Vicky Ford, Louise Haigh, Siân Berry, Tom Harwood, Martin Lewis	
1412	25	5 September 2019	London	Kwasi Kwarteng, Emily Thornberry, Ian Blackford, Layla Moran, Richard Tice, Iain Dale	
1413	26	12 September 2019	Norwich	Brandon Lewis, John Healey, Jeffrey Donaldson, Catherine Barnard, Afua Hirsch	
1414	27	19 September 2019	Southampton	Victoria Atkins, Charles Falconer, Ed Davey, Ash Sarkar, Camilla Tominey	
1415	28	26 September 2019	Cardiff	James Cleverly, Nick Thomas-Symonds, Adam Price, Mark Reckless, Gina Miller	40th anniversary
1416	29	3 October 2019	Wallasey	Nadhim Zahawi, Sarah Jones, Melanie Phillips, Anand Menon, Bonnie Greer	
1417	30	10 October 2019	London	Grant Shapps, Lisa Nandy, Rupert Read, Julia Hartley-Brewer, Theo Paphitis	
1418	31	17 October 2019	Leicester	Matthew Hancock, Anneliese Dodds, Philippa Whitford, Martin Daubney, Javed Khan	
1419	32	24 October 2019	South Shields	Norman Lamont, Richard Leonard, Caroline Voaden, Kate Andrews, Ken Loach	
1420	33	31 October 2019	Birmingham	Paul Scully, Jon Ashworth, Layla Moran, Mairead McGuinness, Isabel Oakeshott	
1421	34	7 November 2019	Glasgow	Kirstene Hair, Barry Gardiner, Humza Yousaf, Angela Haggerty, Iain Anderson	
1422	35	14 November 2019	Brighton	James Cleverly, Clive Lewis, Alex Phillips, Liz Saville Roberts, Chris Boardman	
—	36	19 November 2019	Peterborough (Note: 19 November 2019: General Election special. Filmed 18 November 2019)	Nigel Farage	General Election special, filmed 18 November 2019.
1423	37	21 November 2019	Bolton	Robert Jenrick, Richard Burgon, Chuka Umunna, Philippa Whitford, Sherelle Jacobs	
—	38	22 November 2019	Sheffield (Note: 22 November 2019: General Election special. Broadcast at the earlier time of 19:00)	Boris Johnson, Jeremy Corbyn, Jo Swinson, Nicola Sturgeon	General Election special
1424	39	28 November 2019	Swindon	Brandon Lewis, Andy McDonald, Caroline Lucas, Zanny Minton Beddoes, Lionel Shriver	
1425	40	5 December 2019	Hull	James Cleverly, Anneliese Dodds, Ed Davey, Ian Blackford, Richard Tice	
1426	41	9 December 2019	York	Robert Jenrick, Angela Rayner, Jo Swinson, Humza Yousaf, Adam Price, Jonathan Bartley, Nigel Farage	Under 30s special
1427	42	13 December 2019	London	Grant Shapps, Stephen Kinnock, Drew Hendry, Helen Lewis, Michael Dobbs	

=== 2020 ===
#	No. in year	Airdate	Location	Panellists	Notes
1428	1	9 January 2020	Oxford	Brandon Lewis, Clive Lewis, Anne McElvoy, Miatta Fahnbulleh, Max Hastings	
1429	2	16 January 2020	Liverpool	Helen Whately, Shami Chakrabarti, Alyn Smith, Madeline Grant, Laurence Fox	
1430	3	23 January 2020	London	Theresa Villiers, Emily Thornberry, Mike Barton, Sarah Baxter, Trevor Phillips	
1431	4	30 January 2020	Buxton	James Cleverly, Sarah Jones, Minette Batters, Sacha Lord, Geoff Norcott	Final edition broadcast while the United Kingdom is a member of the European Union.
1432	5	6 February 2020	Harpenden	Robert Buckland, Stella Creasy, Ed Davey, Rachel Shabi, Adam Pearson	
1433	6	13 February 2020	Dundee	Tom Tugendhat, Ian Murray, Joanna Cherry, Alex Massie, Val McDermid	
1434	7	20 February 2020	Weymouth	George Eustice, Alison McGovern, Howard Davies, Ash Sarkar, Michael Portillo	
1435	8	27 February 2020	Middlesbrough	Nadhim Zahawi, Jonathan Ashworth, Alison Phillips, Ayesha Vardag, John Bird	
1436	9	5 March 2020	Tunbridge Wells	Matthew Hancock, Margaret Beckett, Layla Moran, Tim Stanley, Xand van Tulleken	
1437	10	12 March 2020	West Bromwich	Steve Barclay, Louise Haigh, Pete Wishart, John Ashton, Richard Walker	
1438	11	19 March 2020	Weston-super-Mare	Matthew Hancock, Andy Burnham, Tom Solomon, Frances O'Grady, Angela Hartnett	First edition without an audience due to the COVID-19 pandemic. Was also moved to an earlier time of 8 pm.
1439	12	26 March 2020	Shrewsbury	Robert Jenrick, Emily Thornberry, Humphrey Cobbold, Richard Horton	Starting from this edition, although the programme was filmed in London, it was taking pre-recorded questions from the location specified.
1440	13	2 April 2020	Rugby	Matthew Hancock, Yvette Cooper, Donna Kinnair, John Sentamu	
1441	14	9 April 2020	London	Brandon Lewis, Rachel Reeves, Peter Openshaw, Darren McGarvey, Ruby Wax	
1442	15	16 April 2020	Wolverhampton	Robert Buckland, Lisa Nandy, Karan Bilimoria, Rachel Clarke	
1443	16	30 April 2020	Leeds	Grant Shapps, Anneliese Dodds, Jeane Freeman, Paul Nurse, George Osborne	Moved back to its normal time slot
1444	17	7 May 2020	Newcastle	George Eustice, Nick Thomas-Symonds, Afua Hirsch, Juergen Maier, Chris Hopson	
1445	18	14 May 2020	Oxford	Steve Barclay, Bridget Phillipson, Mick Cash, Devi Sridhar, Luke Johnson	
1446	19	21 May 2020	London	Chris Philp, Andy Burnham, Helle Thorning-Schmidt, Camilla Tominey, James Graham	
1447	20	28 May 2020	Glasgow	Helen Whately, Ian Murray, John Swinney, Layla McCay, Alex Massie	First edition since 19 March 2020 to have an audience, albeit in a virtual Zoom format.
1448	21	4 June 2020	Southampton	Nadhim Zahawi, David Lammy, Donna Kinnair, Hugh Pennington	
1449	22	11 June 2020	Cardiff	Robert Buckland, Vaughan Gething, Liz Saville Roberts, Rocco Forte, Bernardine Evaristo	
1450	23	18 June 2020	Plymouth	James Cleverly, Lisa Nandy, Munira Wilson, Steve Parish, Jed Mercurio	
1451	24	25 June 2020	London	Steve Barclay, Jess Phillips, Theo Paphitis, Iona Bain, George the Poet	Under 30s special.
1452	25	17 September 2020	Manchester	Nadhim Zahawi, Jon Ashworth, John Caudwell, Nicci Gerrard, Sunetra Gupta	
1453	26	24 September 2020	London	Alok Sharma, Louise Haigh, Ed Davey, Devi Sridhar, Peter Borg Neal	
1454	27	1 October 2020	Carlisle	Grant Shapps, Alison McGovern, David Linden, Helen Stokes-Lampard, Stuart Rose	
1455	28	8 October 2020	Coventry	Gillian Keegan, Andy Burnham, Donna Kinnair, Yanis Varoufakis, Michael Portillo	
1456	29	15 October 2020	Edinburgh	Douglas Ross, Seema Malhotra, Kate Forbes, Mark Walport, Miriam Brett, Ian Wood	
1457	30	22 October 2020	Sedgefield	Nicky Morgan, Bridget Phillipson, Joseph Stiglitz, Anne Longfield, Stephen Fitzpatrick	
1458	31	29 October 2020	Lincoln	Chris Philp, Nick Thomas-Symonds, Marie van der Zyl, Anthony Scaramucci, Bonnie Greer	
1459	32	5 November 2020	London	Oliver Dowden, Lisa Nandy, Hannah Fry, Jan Halper-Hayes, Simon Wolfson, Rose McGowan	
1460	33	12 November 2020	Dover	Matt Hancock, David Lammy, Robin Shattock, Merryn Somerset Webb, Rosie Jones	
1461	34	19 November 2020	Windsor	James Cleverly, Emily Thornberry, Ian Blackford, Fraser Nelson, Rose Hudson-Wilkin	
1462	35	26 November 2020	Swansea	Nadhim Zahawi, Vaughan Gething, Adam Price, Claire Fox, Tanni Grey-Thompson	
1463	36	3 December 2020	Bath	Michelle Donelan, Sarah Jones, Peter Openshaw, Liam Halligan, Tom Kerridge	
1464	37	10 December 2020	Chelmsford	Robert Buckland, Wes Streeting, Malcolm Turnbull, Anand Menon, Julia Hartley-Brewer	

=== 2021 ===
#	No. in year	Airdate	Location	Panellists	Notes
1465	1	6 January 2021	London	Nadhim Zahawi, Anneliese Dodds, Mark Walport, Humphrey Cobbold, Rachel Clarke	COVID-19 special, broadcast at earlier time of 19:00. First edition with the QT50, a regular audience made up of people from across the UK.
1466	2	14 January 2021	London	Vicky Ford, Jon Ashworth, Philippa Whitford, Donna Kinnair, Mike Barton	
1467	3	21 January 2021	Northern Ireland	Brandon Lewis, Louise Haigh, Arlene Foster, Michelle O'Neill, Anand Menon	
1468	4	28 January 2021	London	Gillian Keegan, Kate Green, Layla McCay, Camilla Tominey, Deborah Meaden	This edition featured the first-ever all female panel in Question Time's history.
1469	5	4 February 2021	London	Oliver Dowden, Thangam Debbonaire, Wanda Wyporska, Robin Shattock, Wilfred Emmanuel-Jones	
1470	6	11 February 2021	Edinburgh	Michael Forsyth, Jeane Freeman, Ian Murray, Angela Haggerty, Stephen Fitzpatrick	
1471	7	18 February 2021	London	Mark Harper, Nadia Whittome, Layla Moran, Linda Bauld, Peter Borg Neal	
1472	8	25 February 2021	London	Grant Shapps, Anneliese Dodds, Tony Danker, Jo Grady, Jeremy King	
1473	9	4 March 2021	London	Kwasi Kwarteng, Lisa Nandy, Andy Palmer, Miatta Fahnbulleh, Theo Paphitis	
1474	10	11 March 2021	London	Mims Davies, Steve Reed, Victor Adebowale, Dan Hodges, Bonnie Greer	
1475	11	18 March 2021	London	Victoria Atkins, Jess Phillips, Kirsten Oswald, Mark Carney, Ian Hislop	
1476	12	25 March 2021	Cardiff	Vaughan Gething, Andrew RT Davies, Adam Price, Claire Fox, Nigel Owens	
1477	13	15 April 2021	London	Bernard Jenkin, Rosie Duffield, Geoff Norcott, Ayesha Hazarika, Xand van Tulleken	The edition ended with a tribute to Shirley Williams who had died earlier in the week and appeared on Question Time 58 times.
1478	14	22 April 2021	Edinburgh	Keith Brown, Douglas Ross, Anas Sarwar, Lorna Slater, Willie Rennie	
1479	15	29 April 2021	London	Anne-Marie Trevelyan, Jon Ashworth, Daisy Cooper, Tim Stanley, Danny Sriskandarajah	
1480	16	6 May 2021	London	Robert Jenrick, Thangam Debbonaire, Hugh Osmond, Deborah Frances-White, John Bercow	
1481	17	13 May 2021	London	Robert Buckland, Lisa Nandy, Kate Forbes, Michelle Dewberry, Paul Mason	
1482	18	20 May 2021	London	Nadhim Zahawi, Nick Thomas-Symonds, Richard Walker, Devi Sridhar, Harriet Green	
1483	19	27 May 2021	London	Grant Shapps, Emily Thornberry, Nadra Ahmed, Kate Clanchy, Tom Newton Dunn	
1484	20	3 June 2021	London	Lucy Frazer, Peter Kyle, Anthony Costello, Heather McGregor, Jenni Murray	
1485	21	10 June 2021	London	Gillian Keegan, Lucy Powell, Yanis Varoufakis, Kavita Oberoi, Frank Luntz	
1486	22	17 June 2021	London	Mark Harper, Sarah Jones, Ian Blackford, Daniel Finkelstein, Rosemary Squire	
1487	23	24 June 2021	London	Robert Buckland, Jon Ashworth, Caroline Lucas, Kate Andrews, Victor Adebowale	
1488	24	1 July 2021	London	David Davis, Andy Burnham, Chika Russell, Madeline Grant, Benjamin Zephaniah	
—	25	18 August 2021	London	James Cleverly, Lisa Nandy, Rory Stewart, Nelufar Hedayat, Mehdi Hasan	Afghanistan special. First edition since 12 March 2020 to have a live studio audience.
1489	26	16 September 2021	London	James Heappey, Kate Green, Nadra Ahmed, Nels Abbey, Andrew Neil	
1490	27	23 September 2021	Cambridge	Grant Shapps, David Lammy, Munira Wilson, Kate Andrews, Richard Walker	
1491	28	30 September 2021	Birmingham	George Eustice, Wes Streeting, Karan Bilimoria, Ella Whelan, Amy Hart	
1492	29	7 October 2021	Aldershot	Nadhim Zahawi, Lisa Nandy, Minette Batters, Nick Ferrari, Rosie Jones	
1493	30	14 October 2021	Nottingham	Penny Mordaunt, Alison McGovern, Robert Winston, Samuel Kasumu, Anne McElvoy	
1494	31	21 October 2021	Glasgow	Kate Forbes, Andrew Bowie, Anas Sarwar, Heather McGregor, Brian Cox	
1495	32	28 October 2021	Manchester	Lucy Frazer, Bridget Phillipson, Howard Davies, Miatta Fahnbulleh, Jenny Campbell	
1496	33	4 November 2021	Eastleigh	Paul Scully, Emily Thornberry, Caroline Lucas, Paul Polman, Tim Stanley	
1497	34	11 November 2021	Hartlepool	Lee Rowley, Lucy Powell, Emma Pinchbeck, Tom Newton Dunn, Alastair Campbell	
1498	35	18 November 2021	London	Mims Davies, Stella Creasy, Stephen Flynn, Nazir Afzal, Jordan Peterson	
1499	36	25 November 2021	Cardiff	Robert Buckland, Eluned Morgan, Liz Saville Roberts, Timandra Harkness, Guto Harri	
1500	37	2 December 2021	Weston-super-Mare	Maggie Throup, Thangam Debbonaire, Wendy Chamberlain, Peter Openshaw, Theo Paphitis	
1501	38	9 December 2021	London	Rachel Maclean, Anneliese Dodds, Steven Bartlett, Michael Portillo, Adjoa Andoh	
1502	39	16 December 2021	Stoke-on-Trent	Chris Philp, Lisa Nandy, Stewart Hosie, Olivia Utley, Chris Hopson	

=== 2022 ===
#	No. in year	Airdate	Location	Panellists	Notes
1503	1	13 January 2022	Shrewsbury	Simon Hart, Jess Phillips, Daisy Cooper, Danny Sriskandarajah, Isabel Oakeshott	
1504	2	20 January 2022	St Andrews	Stephen Kerr, Emily Thornberry, Màiri McAllan, Iain Anderson, Christopher Brookmyre	
1505	3	27 January 2022	Morecambe	James Heappey, Jonathan Reynolds, Alison Phillips, Kavita Oberoi, Liam Halligan	
1506	4	3 February 2022	London	Crispin Blunt, Rosena Allin-Khan, Victor Adebowale, Robin Shattock, Tim Stanley	
1507	5	10 February 2022	Newport	George Eustice, Vaughan Gething, Delyth Jewell, Laura McAllister, Sebastian Payne	
1508	6	17 February 2022	Leeds	Jake Berry, Andy Burnham, Frances O'Grady, Juergen Maier, Inaya Folarin Iman	
1509	7	24 February 2022	London	James Cleverly, David Lammy, Radosław Sikorski, Timothy Garton Ash, Anne McElvoy	
1510	8	3 March 2022	Norwich	Penny Mordaunt, Peter Kyle, Kirsten Oswald, Bridget Kendall, Konstantin Kisin	
—	9	9 March 2022	London	Nadhim Zahawi, David Lammy, Helle Thorning-Schmidt, Lawrence Freedman, Olesya Khromeychuk, Vadym Prystaiko	Special on the Russo-Ukrainian War
1511	10	17 March 2022	Kettering	Suella Braverman, Wes Streeting, Lesia Vasylenko, Max Hastings, Richard Coles	
1512	11	24 March 2022	Reading	Damian Hinds, Lisa Nandy, Mark Serwotka, Kate Andrews, Dom Joly	
1513	12	31 March 2022	Bath	Maria Caulfield, Steve Reed, Ian Blackford, Zanny Minton Beddoes, Julia Hartley-Brewer	Presenter: Victoria Derbyshire
1514	13	7 April 2022	Canterbury	Greg Hands, Emily Thornberry, Justin Welby, Zing Tsjeng, Dan Hodges	
1515	14	28 April 2022	London	Mims Davies, Jon Ashworth, Ed Davey, Camilla Tominey, Bejay Mulenga	
1516	15	5 May 2022	Walsall	Damian Green, Louise Haigh, Wilfred Emmanuel-Jones, Charlotte Ivers, Jack Thorne	
1517	16	12 May 2022	London	Suella Braverman, Shabana Mahmood, Geoff Norcott, Miatta Fahnbulleh, Sebastian Vettel	
1518	17	19 May 2022	Liverpool	Lucy Frazer, Lucy Powell, Alyn Smith, Mo Hussein, Emily Carver	
1519	18	26 May 2022	Belfast	Robert Buckland, John Finucane, Emma Little-Pengelly, Peter Kyle, Naomi Long	
1520	19	9 June 2022	Dorking	Chris Philp, Wes Streeting, Layla Moran, Tom Harwood, Rory Stewart	
1521	20	16 June 2022	Newcastle upon Tyne	Matt Vickers, Thangam Debbonaire, Alison Thewliss, Ella Whelan, Richard Walker	
1522	21	23 June 2022	Stratford-upon-Avon	Rachel Maclean, Nick Thomas-Symonds, Anne Boden, Ben Habib, Mick Lynch	
1523	22	30 June 2022	Inverness	Angus Robertson, Craig Hoy, Pam Duncan-Glancy, Fraser Nelson, Susie McCabe	
1524	23	7 July 2022	Barnsley	Dehenna Davison, Bridget Phillipson, Tim Stanley, Alastair Campbell, Winston Marshall	
1525	24	14 July 2022	Torquay	Bim Afolami, Chris Bryant, Minette Batters, Mary Bousted, Olivia Utley	
1526	25	22 September 2022	Grimsby	Brendan Clarke-Smith, Wes Streeting, Layla Moran, Claire Fox, Gerard Lyons	
1527	26	29 September 2022	Manchester	Paul Scully, Bridget Phillipson, Anne McElvoy, Karan Bilimoria, Richard Bacon	
1528	27	6 October 2022	London	Nadhim Zahawi, Lisa Nandy, Brian Cox, Piers Morgan, Wilfred Emmanuel-Jones	
1529	28	13 October 2022	Musselburgh	John Swinney, Douglas Ross, Anas Sarwar, Isabel Hardman, Stuart Murdoch	
1530	29	20 October 2022	Cheltenham	Graham Stuart, Jess Phillips, Rachel Johnson, Camilla Cavendish, Tony Danker	
1531	30	27 October 2022	London	Lucy Frazer, David Lammy, Julia Hartley-Brewer, Armando Iannucci	
1532	31	3 November 2022	Horsham	Chris Philp, Peter Kyle, Zanny Minton Beddoes, Stuart Rose, George the Poet	
1533	32	10 November 2022	Wells	Mark Harper, Emily Thornberry, Stephanie Flanders, Caroline Lucas, Theo Paphitis	
1534	33	17 November 2022	Snape	Victoria Atkins, Jon Ashworth, Ian Blackford, Kate Andrews, Trevor Phillips	
1535	34	24 November 2022	Skipton	Richard Holden, Andy Burnham, Charlotte Ivers, Ben Habib, Darren McGarvey	
1536	35	1 December 2022	Aberystwyth	David TC Davies, Vaughan Gething, Adam Price, Olivia Utley, Shavanah Taj	
1537	36	8 December 2022	Bishop Auckland	Guy Opperman, Lucy Powell, Stewart Hosie, Isabel Oakeshott, Patrick Grant	
1538	37	15 December 2022	Winchester	Jacob Rees-Mogg, Shabana Mahmood, Daisy Cooper, Pat Cullen, Peter Hitchens	

=== 2023 ===
#	No. in year	Airdate	Location	Panellists	Notes
1539	1	12 January 2023	Birmingham	Alex Chalk, Bridget Phillipson, Anna Soubry, Ash Sarkar, Tim Stanley	
1540	2	19 January 2023	Hoddesdon (Note: 19 January 2022: Edition devoted to discussing issues relating to the health service.)	Will Quince, Wes Streeting, Clare Gerada, Victor Adebowale, James Bartholomew	Special dedicated to the pressures facing the country's health and social care services
1541	3	26 January 2023	Scunthorpe	Jake Berry, Tracy Brabin, Alison Phillips, Konstantin Kisin	
1542	4	2 February 2023	Glasgow	Jenny Gilruth, John Lamont, Ian Murray, India Willoughby, Ella Whelan	
1543	5	9 February 2023	Swindon	George Freeman, Lisa Nandy, Sarah Olney, Inaya Folarin Iman, Matthew Syed	
1544	6	16 February 2023	Rugby	Robert Jenrick, Stephen Kinnock, Ruth Wishart, Lionel Shriver, Ian Hislop	
1545	7	23 February 2023	Cardiff	David TC Davies, Liz Saville Roberts, Thangam Debbonaire, Rakie Ayola, Anita Boateng	
1546	8	2 March 2023	Sunderland	Graham Stuart, Jonathan Reynolds, Kirsty Blackman, Juergen Maier, Tom Harwood	
1547	9	9 March 2023	London	Robert Jenrick, Sarah Jones, Kenneth Clarke, Yasmin Alibhai-Brown, Richard Madeley	
1548	10	16 March 2023	Warrington	Bim Afolami, Lucy Powell, Stephen Flynn, Anne McElvoy, John Allan	
1549	11	23 March 2023	Newcastle-under-Lyme	Andrew Bowie, Louise Haigh, Zing Tsjeng, Howard Davies, Tom Newton Dunn	
1550	12	30 March 2023	Bristol	Andrew Murrison, Emily Thornberry, Helen Morgan, Fraser Nelson, Danny Sriskandarajah	
1551	13	20 April 2023	York	Jeremy Quin, Wes Streeting, Carla Denyer, Merryn Somerset Webb, John Sentamu	
1552	14	27 April 2023	London	Rachel Maclean, Lisa Nandy, Layla Moran, Camilla Tominey	
1553	15	4 May 2023	Telford	Mark Harper, David Lammy, Minette Batters, Peter Hitchens, Billy Bragg	
1554	16	11 May 2023	Bexhill-on-Sea	Helen Whately, Thangam Debbonaire, Richard Coles, Ash Sarkar, Nick Ferrari	
1555	17	18 May 2023	Fort William	Màiri McAllan, Malcolm Offord, Jackie Baillie, Alex Salmond, Nina Myskow	
1556	18	25 May 2023	Gravesend	Laura Trott, Peter Kyle, Munira Wilson, Janet Street-Porter, Theo Paphitis	
1557	19	1 June 2023	Leicester	George Freeman, Jess Phillips, Jack Monroe, Chris Patten	
1558	20	8 June 2023	King's Lynn	Lee Rowley, Jon Ashworth, Ayesha Hazarika, Jonathan Sumption	
1559	21	15 June 2023	Deeside	David TC Davies, David Blunkett, Charlotte Ivers, Guto Harri, David Linden	
1560	22	22 June 2023 (Note: 22 June 2023: An edition marking the seventh anniversary of the EU referendum in which the audience was made up entirely of Leave voters.)	Clacton-on-Sea	John Redwood, Jenny Chapman, Ben Habib, Alastair Campbell, Anand Menon	
1561	23	29 June 2023	Exeter	Helen Whately, Rosena Allin-Khan, Mhairi Black, Dia Chakravarty, Hugh Fearnley-Whittingstall	
1562	23	6 July 2023	Fleetwood	Johnny Mercer, Bridget Phillipson, Kate Andrews, Dale Vince	
1563	24	21 September 2023	Ipswich	Kevin Hollinrake, Thangam Debbonaire, Ella Whelan, Matthew Syed	
1564	25	28 September 2023	Manchester	Mark Spencer, Lisa Nandy, Wendy Chamberlain, Tim Montgomerie, Henri Murison	
1565	26	5 October 2023	Wolverhampton	Richard Holden, Jonathan Ashworth, Emma Dabiri, Richard Walker, Tony Parsons	
1566	27	12 October 2023	London	Victoria Atkins, Yvette Cooper, Piers Morgan, Halima Begum, Jake Wallis Simons	
1567	28	19 October 2023	Lisburn	Chris Heaton-Harris, Hilary Benn, John Finucane, Sorcha Eastwood, Jeffrey Donaldson	
1568	29	26 October 2023	Bradford	Lee Rowley, Jonathan Reynolds, Alyn Smith, Sayeeda Warsi, Gabriel Pogrund	
1569	30	2 November 2023	Chipping Campden	Jeremy Quin, Nick Thomas-Symonds, Camilla Cavendish, Marie van der Zyl, Mustafa Suleyman	
1570	31	9 November 2023	Llandudno	David TC Davies, Chris Bryant, Liz Saville Roberts, Camilla Kerslake, Anne McElvoy	
1571	32	16 November 2023	Bridgwater	Jacob Rees-Mogg, Bridget Phillipson, Paul Johnson, Juliet Samuel, Danny Sriskandarajah	
1572	33	23 November 2023	Stevenage	Andrew Griffith, Alison McGovern, Isabel Oakeshott, Patrick Grant	
1573	35	30 November 2023	Doncaster	Esther McVey, Steve Reed, Layla Moran, Zoe Lyons, Andrew Neil	
1574	36	7 December 2023	Petersfield	Johnny Mercer, Anneliese Dodds, Peter Hitchens, George Monbiot	
1575	37	14 December 2023	Kelso	Angela Constance, Meghan Gallacher, Anas Sarwar, Kate Andrews, Stephen Noon	

=== 2024 ===
#	No. in year	Airdate	Location	Panellists	Notes
1576	1	11 January 2024	Oxford	Andrea Leadsom, Lisa Nandy, Stuart Rose, Anand Menon	
1577	2	18 January 2024	Peterborough	Bim Afolami, Emily Thornberry, Kate McCann, Hashi Mohamed	
1578	3	25 January 2024	Gillingham	Alex Burghart, Jon Ashworth, Bronwen Maddox, Sonia Sodha, Konstantin Kisin	
1579	4	1 February 2024	Glasgow	Kate Forbes, Patrick Harvie, Malcolm Offord, Ian Murray, Fraser Nelson	
1580	5	8 February 2024	Nottingham	James Daly, Wes Streeting, Daisy Cooper, Inaya Folarin Iman, Paddy McGuinness	
1581	6	15 February 2024	Lancaster	Graham Stuart, Lucy Powell, Drew Hendry, Jill Kirby, Juergen Maier	
1582	7	22 February 2024	Maidenhead	Laura Farris, Stella Creasy, Camilla Tominey, Jason Arday	
1583	8	29 February 2024	London	Sayeeda Warsi, David Lammy, Caroline Lucas, Tim Stanley	
1584	9	7 March 2024	Cardiff	David TC Davies, Nick Thomas-Symonds, Rhun ap Iorwerth, Stephanie Flanders, Guto Harri	
1585	10	14 March 2024	Liverpool	Lee Rowley, Jonathan Reynolds, Stephen Flynn, Ayesha Hazarika, Melanie Phillips	
1586	11	21 March 2024	Middlesbrough	Rachel Maclean, Sarah Jones, Tim Farron, Philippa Gregory, Rod Liddle	
1587	12	18 April 2024	Buxton	David TC Davies, Bridget Phillipson, Carla Denyer, Richard Tice	
1588	13	25 April 2024	London	Chris Philp, Wes Streeting, Munira Wilson, Victor Adebowale, Charles Moore	
1589	14	2 May 2024	Northstowe	Bim Afolami, Peter Kyle, Kirsty Blackman, Joseph Stiglitz, Anita Boateng	
1590	15	9 May 2024	Stoke-on-Trent	Nigel Huddleston, Lisa Nandy, Grace Blakeley, Humphrey Cobbold	
1591	16	16 May 2024	Aberdeen	Stephen Flynn, Meghan Gallacher, Anas Sarwar, Alex Salmond, Iain Dale	
1592	17	23 May 2024	Coventry	Mark Spencer, Bridget Phillipson, Daisy Cooper, Tim Montgomerie	
1593	18	30 May 2024	Epsom	Damian Hinds, Wes Streeting, Nigel Farage, Rose Hudson-Wilkin, Piers Morgan	
1594	19	6 June 2024	Chester	Mark Harper, Shabana Mahmood, Carla Denyer, Liz Saville Roberts	
1595	20	13 June 2024	Edinburgh	Kate Forbes, Douglas Ross, Anas Sarwar, Stephen Noon, Iain Anderson	
—	21	20 June 2024 (Note: 20 June 2024: A General Election Leaders' Special, fourteen days ahead of the vote. Chaired by Fiona Bruce.)	York	Rishi Sunak, Keir Starmer, John Swinney, Ed Davey	General Election Leaders' Special
—	22	24 June 2024 (Note: 24 June 2024: A General Election Leaders' Special, ten days ahead of the vote. Chaired by Bethan Rhys Roberts.)	Cardiff	Rhun ap Iorwerth	General Election Leaders' Special
1596	23	27 June 2024	Birmingham	Andrew Mitchell, Yvette Cooper, Layla Moran, Stephen Flynn	
—	24	28 June 2024 (Note: 28 June 2024: A General Election Leaders' Special, six days ahead of the vote. Chaired by Fiona Bruce.)	Birmingham	Nigel Farage, Adrian Ramsay	General Election Leaders' Special
—	25	5 July 2024 (Note: 5 July 2024: A special debate, a day after the General Election. Chaired by Fiona Bruce.)	London	Steve Reed, Daniel Finkelstein, Daisy Cooper, Ben Habib, Andrew Marr	General Election special debate
1597	26	11 July 2024	Colchester	Peter Kyle, George Freeman, Siân Berry, Camilla Cavendish	
1598	27	19 September 2024	Manchester	Lucy Powell, Graham Stuart, Tim Farron, Jill Kirby, Mariana Mazzucato	
1599	28	26 September 2024	Milton Keynes	Nick Thomas-Symonds, Nadhim Zahawi, Carla Denyer, Zia Yusuf	
1600	29	3 October 2024	Dundee	Jenny Gilruth, Ian Murray, Andrew Bowie, Wendy Chamberlain, Iain Macwhirter	
—	30	10 October 2024	Philadelphia	Malcolm Kenyatta, Martina White, Mehdi Hasan, Bryan Lanza, Anthony Zurcher	US election special
1601	31	17 October 2024	Rotherham	Douglas Alexander, Damian Green, Steve Rigby, Ash Sarkar, Konstantin Kisin	
1602	32	24 October 2024	Plymouth	Steve Reed, Nigel Huddleston, Emily Sheffield, Danny Sriskandarajah	
1603	33	31 October 2024	Guildford	Darren Jones, Andrew Griffith, Munira Wilson, Tom Hunter, Craig Oliver	
1604	34	7 November 2024	Hartlepool	Sarah Jones, Matt Vickers, Tim Montgomerie, Bonnie Greer	
1605	35	14 November 2024	Basingstoke	Jonathan Reynolds, Damian Hinds, Ellie Chowns, Greg Jackson, Tim Stanley	
1606	36	21 November 2024	Trowbridge	Nick Thomas-Symonds, Harriett Baldwin, Daisy Cooper, Minette Batters	
1607	37	28 November 2024	London	Lisa Nandy, Jacob Rees-Mogg, Mariella Frostrup, Rory Stewart, Anand Menon	
1608	38	5 December 2024	Lincoln	Jacqui Smith, Kevin Hollinrake, Nigel Farage, Alastair Campbell	
1609	39	12 December 2024	London	Wes Streeting, Nigel Huddleston, Christine Jardine, Emma Dabiri, Piers Morgan	

=== 2025 ===
#	No. in year	Airdate	Location	Panellists	Notes
1610	1	16 January 2025	Northampton	Chris Bryant, Nadine Dorries, Calum Miller, Ayesha Hazarika, Liam Halligan	
1611	2	23 January 2025	Manchester	Lucy Powell, David Davis, Dale Vince, Matthew Parris	
1612	3	30 January 2025	Melton Mowbray	James Murray, Kieran Mullan, Helen Morgan, Zia Yusuf, Alison Phillips	
1613	4	6 February 2025	Glasgow	Kate Forbes, Michael Shanks, Russell Findlay, Lorna Slater, Alex Massie	
1614	5	13 February 2025	Northwich	Jacqui Smith, Danny Kruger, Lisa Smart, Matt Goodwin, George Monbiot	
1615	6	20 February 2025	London	Nick Carter, Lesia Vasylenko, Jan Halper-Hayes, Nick Thomas-Symonds, Ben Wallace	Special on the third year of the Russo-Ukrainian War
1616	7	27 February 2025	Derby	Luke Pollard, Alicia Kearns, Maya Goodfellow, John Caudwell, Freddy Gray	
1617	8	6 March 2025	Skipton	Bridget Phillipson, Harriett Baldwin, Richard Tice, Adrian Ramsay	
1618	9	13 March 2025	Wolverhampton	Emma Reynolds, Luke Evans, Wendy Chamberlain, Faiza Shaheen, Konstantin Kisin	
1619	10	20 March 2025	Reading	Steve Reed, Helen Whately, Fraser Nelson, Richard Bacon, Greg Swenson	
1620	11	27 March 2025	Dartford	Darren Jones, Richard Holden, Daisy Cooper, Camilla Tominey, Gary Stevenson	
1621	12	3 April 2025	Cardiff	Chris Bryant, Mims Davies, Rhun ap Iorwerth, Emily Sheffield, Shavanah Taj	
1622	13	8 May 2025	Hull	James Murray, Graham Stuart, Calum Miller, Richard Tice, Jo Grady	
1623	14	15 May 2025	Aldershot	Peter Kyle, Nigel Huddleston, Sonia Sodha, Alex Depledge	
1624	15	22 May 2025	London	Nick Thomas-Symonds, Kieran Mullan, Zanny Minton Beddoes, Inaya Folarin Iman, Hashi Mohamed	
1625	16	29 May 2025	Cheltenham	Heidi Alexander, David Simmonds, Jess Brown-Fuller, Ava Evans, Tim Montgomerie	
1626	17	5 June 2025	Llandudno	Alex Davies-Jones, Darren Millar, Llinos Medi, Annabel Denham, Mark Serwotka	
1627	18	12 June 2025	Fleetwood	Darren Jones, Simon Clarke, Sarah Olney, Zia Yusuf	
1628	19	19 June 2025	London	Katharine Birbalsingh, Jack Thorne, TommyInnit, Peter Kyle, David Willetts	Special episode on the challenges of growing up in the 21st century
1629	20	26 June 2025	St Andrews	Shirley-Anne Somerville, Anas Sarwar, Andrew Bowie, Thomas Kerr, Lesley Riddoch	
1630	21	18 September 2025	London	Douglas Alexander, James Cleverly, Piers Morgan, Bonnie Greer	Special episode on a year of Donald Trump in the White House and his second state visit to the United Kingdom.
1631	22	25 September 2025	Bedworth	Lisa Nandy, Luke Evans, Munira Wilson, Richard Tice, Billy Bragg	
1631	23	2 October 2025	Belfast	Hilary Benn, Alex Burghart, John Finucane, Jonathan Buckley, Aoife Moore	
1633	24	9 October 2025	Shrewsbury	James Murray, Nigel Huddleston, Zack Polanski, Zia Yusuf, Annabel Denham	
1634	25	16 October 2025	Bishop's Stortford	Heidi Alexander, Helen Whately, Lisa Smart, Ash Sarkar, Matthew Syed	
1635	26	23 October 2025	Swindon	Stephen Kinnock, Harriett Baldwin, Mariella Frostrup, Nadine Dorries	
1636	27	30 October 2025	Bradford	Lisa Nandy, Harriet Cross, Matt Goodwin, Faiza Shaheen	
1637	28	6 November 2025	Sunderland	Anna Turley, Graham Stuart, Paul Nowak, Tim Stanley	
1638	29	13 November 2025	London	Alex Davies-Jones, Kenneth Clarke, Zarah Sultana, Danny Kruger	
1639	30	20 November 2025	Loughborough	Stephen Kinnock, Joe Robertson, Josh Babarinde, Ella Whelan, Zoe Lyons	
1640	31	27 November 2025	Watford	James Murray, Gareth Davies, Calum Miller, Sonia Sodha, Luke Johnson	
1641	32	4 December 2025	Dover	Mike Tapp, Kieran Mullan, Daisy Cooper, Zack Polanski, Zia Yusuf	Special episode on the subject of immigration.
1642	33	11 December 2025	Paisley	Stephen Flynn, Anas Sarwar, Russell Findlay, Malcolm Offord, Angela Haggerty	

=== 2026 ===
#	No. in year	Airdate	Location	Panellists	Notes
1643	1	22 January 2026	Macclesfield	Emily Thornberry, Stuart Andrew, Layla Moran, Greg Swenson	
1644	2	29 January 2026	King's Lynn	Douglas Alexander, James Cartlidge, Jo Grady, Konstantin Kisin	
1645	3	5 February 2026	Dorking	Emma Reynolds, Julia Lopez, Munira Wilson, Zia Yusuf, Oli Dugmore	
1646	4	12 February 2026	Bristol	Luke Pollard, Ben Spencer, Nadine Dorries, Ellie Chowns	
1647	5	19 February 2026	Ringwood	Heidi Alexander, Richard Holden, Jon Sopel, Robert Jenrick	
1648	6	26 February 2026	Birmingham	Lisa Nandy, Alicia Kearns, Jess Brown-Fuller, Tom Kerridge, Esther Krakue	
1649	7	5 March 2026	Kettering	Stephen Doughty, James Cleverly, Shashank Joshi, George Monbiot, Annabel Denham	
1650	8	12 March 2026	Manchester	Lucy Powell, Harriett Baldwin, Siân Berry, Kay Burley, Fraser Nelson	
1651	9	19 March 2026	London	Wes Streeting, Helen Whately, Josh Babarinde, Caroline Lucas, James Orr	
1652	10	26 March 2026	Clacton-on-Sea	Jake Richards, Tom Tugendhat, Layla Moran, Tom Skinner	
1653	11	16 April 2026	Cardiff	Huw Irranca-Davies, Rhun ap Iorwerth, Dan Thomas, Darren Millar, Jane Dodds, Anthony Slaughter	Special programme ahead of the 2026 Senedd election
1654	12	23 April 2026	Aberdeen	Màiri McAllan, Anas Sarwar, Russell Findlay, Malcolm Offord, Gillian Mackay, Alex Cole-Hamilton	Special programme ahead of the 2026 Scottish Parliament election
1655	13	30 April 2026	Maidenhead	Emma Reynolds, Victoria Atkins, Daisy Cooper, Rachel Millward, Zia Yusuf	Special programme ahead of the 2026 United Kingdom local elections
1656	14	8 May 2026	London	Peter Kyle, Kevin Hollinrake, Robert Jenrick, Dave Doogan, Liz Saville Roberts, Rachel Millward, Josh Babarinde, Piers Morgan	Special programme following the elections in England, Wales and Scotland
1657	15	14 May 2026	London	Jenny Chapman, Michael Gove, Steve Wright, Danny Kruger	
1658	16	21 May 2026	Dumfries	Kirsty McNeill, Harriet Cross, Stephen Flynn, Ross Greer, Thomas Kerr	
1659	17	28 May 2026	London	Darren Jones, Julia Lopez, Mo Gawdat, Laura Gilbert, Victor Riparbelli	Special episode on the subject of AI
1660	18	4 June 2026	Makerfield	Andy Burnham, Michael Winstanley, Jake Austin, Sarah Wakefield, Robert Kenyon	Special programme for the 2026 Makerfield by-election consisting of the candidates from the five main parties.
1661	19	26 June 2026	Kettering	Emily Thornberry, Kevin Hollinrake, Zia Yusuf, Stephanie Flanders	Special programme following the resignation of Keir Starmer as Prime Minister.
1662	20	17 September 2026	Salisbury	Heidi Alexander, Joy Morrissey, Danny Kruger, Caroline Lucas	
1663	21	24 September 2026	Cambridge	Jonathan Reynolds, Helen Whately, Josh Babarinde, Andrew Neil, Ash Sarkar	
1664	22	1 October 2026	London	Miatta Fahnbulleh, Julia Lopez, Suella Braverman, Oli Dugmore	
1665	23	8 October 2026	Peterlee	Jake Richards, Harriet Cross, Max Wilkinson, Kevin Maguire, Annabel Denham	
1666	24	15 October 2026	Brecon	Stephen Kinnock, Mims Davies, Delyth Jewell, James Evans, George Monbiot	
1667	25	22 October 2026	Scunthorpe	Wes Streeting, Tom Tugendhat, Ellie Chowns, Stephanie Flanders, Geoff Norcott	
1668	26	29 October 2026	Warwick	Emma Reynolds, James Cartlidge, Daisy Cooper, Zia Yusuf, Alastair Campbell	
1669	27	5 November 2026	Liverpool	Lucy Powell, Luke Evans, Paul Nowak, Tim Stanley, John Amaechi	
1670	28	12 November 2026	Exeter	Luke Pollard, Ben Spencer, Layla Moran, Matt Goodwin, Deborah Frances-White	
1671	29	19 November 2026	Worthing	David Lammy, Joe Robertson, Adrian Ramsay, Fraser Nelson, Alex Depledge	
1672	30	26 November 2026	Clydebank		
1673	31	3 December 2026	Morecambe		
1674	32	10 December 2026	Northampton		
Future locations and panellists sometimes change. Updates to locations are listed on the Question Time website or on-air.
