= Sunday with Laura Kuenssberg =

2022 British television programme

- Title card used since 2022
- Genre: Politics; Current affairs
- Presented by: Laura Kuenssberg; Victoria Derbyshire (relief presenter)
- Country of origin: United Kingdom
- Original language: English

Production
- Running time: 60 minutes

Original release
- Network: BBC One; BBC News (UK feed); BBC News (international feed)
- Release: 4 September 2022 – present

Related
- The Andrew Marr Show/Sunday Morning

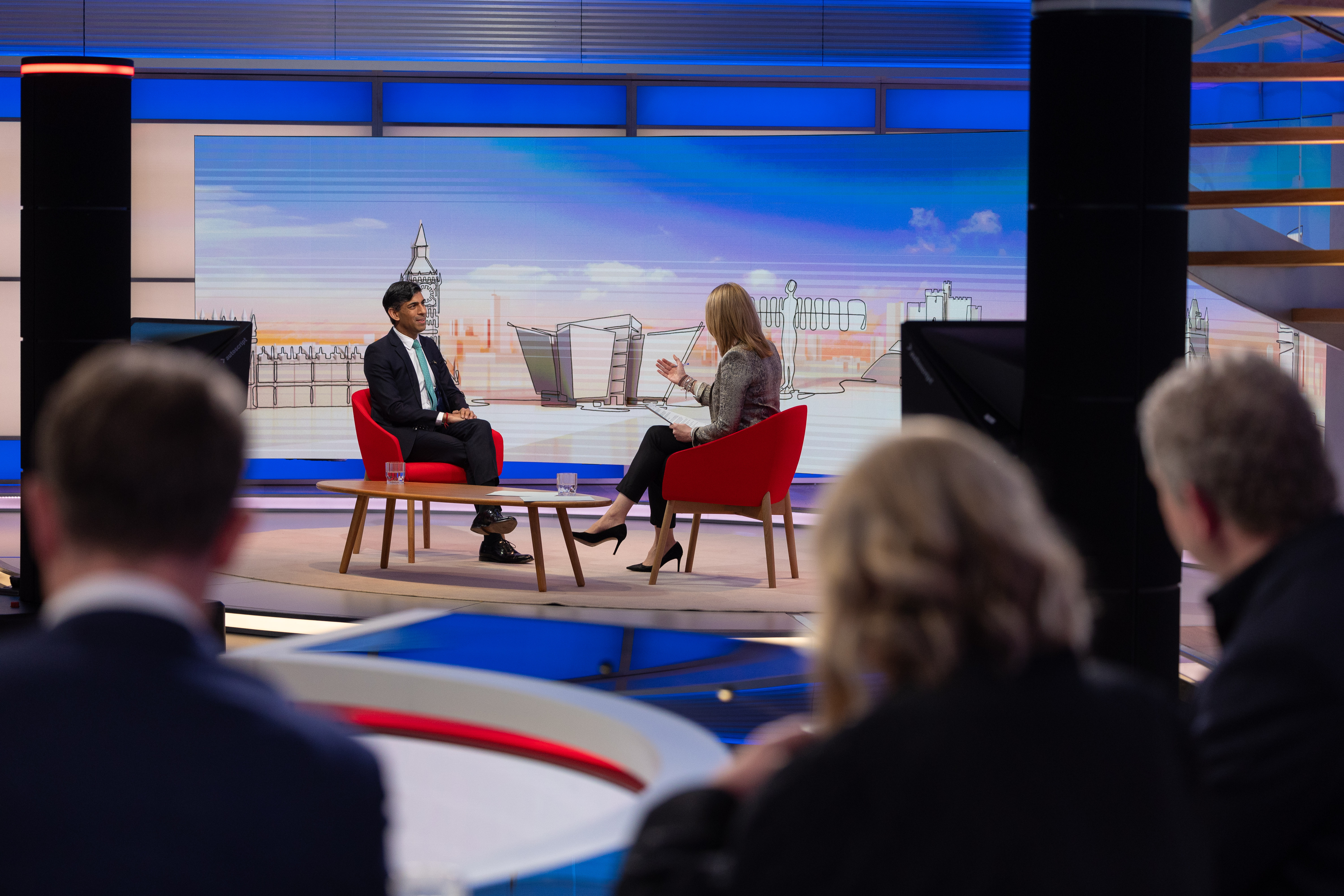
A 7 January 2024 episode of the show, in which Rishi Sunak is interviewed by Kuenssberg, while panellists Jon Culshaw, Louise Casey and Fraser Nelson watch

Sunday with Laura Kuenssberg is a British Sunday morning talk show presented by Laura Kuenssberg, broadcast on BBC One.

The programme replaced The Andrew Marr Show as the network's flagship Sunday talk show. Similar to previous Sunday morning programmes, Sunday with Laura Kuenssberg contains interviews with political figures and others involved in the events of the week.

== Background ==
In March 2022, it was announced that Kuenssberg, who had left her role as BBC News' political editor, would be replacing Andrew Marr in a full-time role as the host of BBC One's flagship Sunday morning talk show, which was announced to be starting in September 2022. Marr resigned from the BBC to front a talk show on LBC in 2021.

In an interview Kuenssberg gave to British Vogue on 23 August 2022, it was announced that the show would be broadcast on 4 September 2022.

More details about the programme were released on 28 August 2022, which included a short trailer of Kuenssberg talking to a politician from his or her point of view. The show does not have the traditional Sunday paper review section; instead it highlights the front pages of the day's newspapers, a BBC News Summary or Weather For The Week Ahead, like its predecessors.

== Reception ==
Since Laura Kuenssberg took over the show from Andrew Marr, the show has seen a rapid decline in viewers, thought to be more a reflection on Laura Kuenssberg's general unpopularity rather than the format of the show itself.

Jim Waterson of The Guardian said "...in a sign of the declining importance of the print press, Kuenssberg's new show has broken with the Sunday political show tradition of having a formal in-depth newspaper review. Instead, the front pages were flashed on screen for a few seconds – meaning the Mail on Sunday headline "BBC Comic's C-word jibe against PM" was barely visible." The first episode had 1.5 million viewers.

The debut episode also gathered attention due to the comments from comedian Joe Lycett who was a panellist, including questions from a Conservative MP in a select committee of the House of Commons.

== Presenters ==
Year	Presenter	Role
2022–present	Laura Kuenssberg	Main presenter
2023–present	Victoria Derbyshire	Relief presenter

The title card and branding of the programme always state Sunday with Laura Kuenssberg with Kuenssberg's face part of onscreen title, regardless of whether it is herself or the relief presenter who presents the episode.

== Episodes ==
Season	Episode		Date	Interviews	Panellists	Source Link
Season	Series	Overall	Date	Interviews	Panellists	Source Link
1	1	1	4 September 2022	Liz Truss; Rishi Sunak; Olena Zelenska	Emily Thornberry; Joe Lycett; Cleo Watson	
1	2	2	11 September 2022	Theresa May; David Cameron; Gordon Brown; Caroline Kennedy	Nicholas Soames; Alison Phillips; Baroness Amos	
1	3	3	18 September 2022	Sir Tony Radakin; Jacinda Ardern; Sheikh Hasina; John Kerry	Lord Sentamu; Victoria Newton; Sir Lindsay Hoyle	
1	4	4	25 September 2022	Keir Starmer; Kwasi Kwarteng	Frances O'Grady; Gerard Lyons; Richard Walker	
1	5	5	2 October 2022	Liz Truss; Rachel Reeves; Mark Hamill	Michael Gove; Pippa Crerar; Sharon White	
1	6	6	9 October 2022	Nicola Sturgeon; Nadhim Zahawi; Nadine Dorries; Douglas Henshall	Alistair Darling; Joanna Cherry; Martin Pibworth	
1	7	7	16 October 2022	Jeremy Hunt; Jonathan Reynolds; Ozlem Tureci; Ugur Sahin	John Allan; Christina McAnea; Matt Hancock	
1	8	8	23 October 2022	Keir Starmer; Penny Mordaunt; Dominic Raab; Jacob Rees-Mogg	Iain Duncan Smith; Mervyn King; Jane Green	
1	9	9	30 October 2022	Michael Gove; Yvette Cooper; David Harewood; Zachary Quinto	Caroline Lucas; Iain Anderson; Philip Hammond	
1	10	10	6 November 2022	Oliver Dowden; Ed Miliband; Ed Davey; Sue Campbell	Diana Johnson; Myles Allen; Justine Greening	
1	11	11	13 November 2022	Jeremy Hunt; Rachel Reeves; Sir Tony Radakin	Roula Khalaf; Paul Johnson; Simon Schama	
1	12	12	20 November 2022	Steve Barclay; Jonathan Ashworth; Howard Hu	Tony Danker; Gary Smith; Chloe Morgan	
1	13	13	27 November 2022	Mark Harper; Lisa Nandy; Bonnie Tyler	Hannah Fry; Jake Berry; Frances O'Grady	
1	14	14	4 December 2022	Nadhim Zahawi; Bridget Phillipson	Beeban Kidron; Jimmy Wales; Alex Baldock	
1	15	15	11 December 2022	James Cleverly; Wes Streeting; Steve Powis	Pat Cullen; Stuart Rose; Simon Sebag Montefiore	
1	16	16	18 December 2022	Oliver Dowden; Yvette Cooper; Howard Hu	Justin Welby; Victoria Newton; Susanna Reid	
2	1	17	8 January 2023	Rishi Sunak; Wes Streeting; Sam Mendes	Clive Kay; Andy Haldane; Pat Cullen	
2	2	18	15 January 2023	Keir Starmer; Mark Harper	Brian Cox; Caroline Nokes; Howard Davies	
2	3	19	22 January 2023	Nicola Sturgeon; James Cleverly; Rachel Reeves	Iain Duncan Smith; Rachel Johnson; John Allan	
2	4	20	29 January 2023	Michael Gove; Bridget Phillipson; Jane Hartley; Jenna Coleman; Aiden Turner	Michel Barnier; Mary Bousted; Katharine Birbalsingh	
2	5	21	5 February 2023	Grant Shapps; Sharon Graham; Ed Davey; Timur Miroshnychenko	Kate Bingham; Jake Berry; Liz Kendall	
2	6	22	12 February 2023	Andrew Mitchell; Lisa Nandy; Andrzej Duda; Prue Leith	Vadym Prystaiko; Priya Lakhani; John Nicolson	
2	7	23	19 February 2023	Penny Mordaunt; Yvette Cooper; Wendy Sherman; Hugh Jackman	Wendy Morton; Bill Browder; Stephen Flynn	
2	8	24	26 February 2023	Dominic Raab; David Lammy; Humza Yousaf	Dave Penman; Thomasina Miers; George Eustice	
2	9	25	5 March 2023	Chris Heaton-Harris; Jonathan Ashworth; Judy Thomas; Baroness Kidron; Ash Regan	Fraser Nelson; Hannah Fry; Sam Tarry	
2	10	26	12 March 2023	Jeremy Hunt; Rachel Reeves; Mark Thompson	Simon Clarke; Nadia Whittome; Peter Salmon	
2	11	27	19 March 2023	Oliver Dowden; Lisa Nandy; Kate Forbes; Georgia Harrison	Justine Roberts; Oli Dugmore; Brent Hoberman	
2	12	28	26 March 2023	Michael Gove; Lucy Powell; Richard Hughes; Marina Ovsyannikova	Andy Haldane; Christiana Figueres; Andy Street	
2	13	29	2 April 2023	Suella Braverman; Lisa Nandy; Jenn Tallinn; Judy Blume	Tracy Brabin; Minette Batters; Murray Lambell	
2	14	30	16 April 2023	Wes Streeting; Pat Cullen; Greg Hands; Carole Mundell	Saffron Cordery; Market Baillie; Stephanie Flanders	
2	15	31	23 April 2023	Amanda Spielman; Oliver Dowden; Jonathan Ashworth; Ed Davey	Mary Bousted; Lorna Hughes; Henry Dimbleby	
2	16	32	30 April 2023	Mark Harper; Shabana Mahmood; Adrian Ramsay; Nazanin Boniadi	Nicholas Soames; Adjoa Andoh; Matt Clifford	
2	17	33	7 May 2023	Lucy Frazer MP; Wes Streeting; Chris Hipkins	Ed Davey; Alison Phillips; Jason Arday	
2	18	34	14 May 2023	Grant Shapps; Jonathan Reynolds; Emad Mostaque; Cindy McCain	Thomasina Miers; Greg Jackson; Pippa Crerar	
2	19	35	21 May 2023	Thérèse Coffey; Wes Streeting; Arnold Schwarzenegger	Martin Lewis; Fatima Ibrahim; Jake Berry	
2	20	36	28 May 2023	Andrey Kelin; Steve Barclay; Jonathan Ashworth	Shevaun Haviland; Bill Browder; Vivek Trivedi	
2	21	37	4 June 2023	Robert Jenrick; Joseph Wu; Jonathan Reynolds; Tom Hollander; Will Keen	Rain Newton-Smith; Salma Shah; Brian Cox	
2	22	38	11 June 2023	Grant Shapps; David Lammy; Humza Yousaf; Nigel Farage	Alan Cumming; Isabel Oakeshott; Michael Howard	
2	23	39	18 June 2023	Michael Gove; Anas Sarwar; Mark Rylance; Evgenia Kara-Murza	Simon Schama; Samuel Kasumu; Justine Greening	
2	24	40	25 June 2023	Rishi Sunak; Lisa Nandy; Steve Rosenberg; Rick Astley	Marina Litvinenko; Ben Elton; Luke Tryl	
2	25	41	2 July 2023	Amanda Pritchard; Steve Barclay; Bridget Phillipson; Christina Koch	Michael Mosley; Lord Bethell; Baroness Kidron	
2	26	42	9 July 2023	Rachel Reeves; Victoria Atkins; John Kerry; James Norton; Luke Thompson	David Gauke; Alison Phillips; Stewart Purvis	
2	27	43	16 July 2023	Keir Starmer; Kemi Badenoch; Sarah Walsh	Sharon White; Oli Dugmore; Andrea Leadsom	
3	1	44	3 September 2023	Jeremy Hunt; Bridget Phillipson; Timothy Spall	Piers Morgan; Hugh Fearnley-Whittingstall; Rachel de Souza	
3	2	45	10 September 2023	Alex Chalk; Jonathan Reynolds; Mark Milley; Tony Radakin	Stephen Fry; Salma Shah; Charlie Taylor	
3	3	46	17 September 2023	James Cleverly; Pat McFadden; Ian Russell	Jane Moore; Irvine Welsh; Nimco Ali	
3	4	47	24 September 2023	Grant Shapps; Ed Davey; Darren Jones	Rachel Johnson; Yanis Varoufakis; Craig Mackinlay	
3	5	48	1 October 2023	Rishi Sunak; Wes Streeting; Helen Mirren	Fraser Nelson; Louise Casey; Jon Culshaw	
3	6	49	8 October 2023	Keir Starmer; Mark Harper; Steve Coogan	Katharine Viner; Alex Baldock; Jo Grady	
3	7	50	15 October 2023	James Cleverly; Mark Regev; Husam Zomlot; Humza Yousaf; David Lammy	Malcolm Rifkind; Bronwen Maddox; Dhananjayan Sriskandarajah	
3	8	51	22 October 2023	Naftali Bennett; Hanan Ashrawi; Robert Jenrick; Lisa Nandy	Jasmine El-Gamal; Simon Sebag Montefiore; Lucy Fisher	
3	9	52	29 October 2023	Michelle Donelan; Peter Kyle; Alex Karp	Layla Moran; David Davis; Alison Phillips	
3	10	53	5 November 2023	Oliver Dowden; John Healey; Hossam Zaki; Sarah Snook	Carla Denyer; James Bethell; Piers Morgan	
3	11	54	12 November 2023	Grant Shapps; Yvette Cooper; Michael Grade	Nadine Dorries; Shami Chakrabarti; Kim Darroch	
3	12	55	19 November 2023	Jeremy Hunt; Rachel Reeves; Joanna Scanlan	John McDonnell; Shevaun Haviland; Andy Street	
3	13	56	26 November 2023	Kyriakos Mitsotakis; Laura Trott; Darren Jones; Catherine Tate	Richard Tice; Christina McAnea; Alistair Phillips-Davies	
3	14	57	3 December 2023	Victoria Atkins; Jonathan Reynolds; Ndileka Mandela; Mark Regev	Jane Moore; Andrew Roberts; Kamila Hawthorne	
3	15	58	10 December 2023	Robert Jenrick; Olena Zelenska; Michael Gove; Liz Kendall	Bill Browder; Pippa Crerar; Damian Green	
3	16	59	17 December 2023	Michelle Mone; Doug Barrowman; Oliver Dowden; Wes Streeting	Brian Cox; Susanna Reid; Robert Buckland	
4	1	60	7 January 2024	Rishi Sunak; Bridget Phillipson; Lee Castleton	Jon Culshaw; Louise Casey; Fraser Nelson	
4	2	61	14 January 2024	David Cameron; Keir Starmer	Alan Cumming; Isabel Oakeshott; Geordie Greig	
4	3	62	21 January 2024	Grant Shapps; Yvette Cooper; Humza Yousaf	Simon Reeve; Nicky Morgan; Tom Hunter	
4	4	63	28 January 2024	Kemi Badenoch; Jonathan Reynolds; Carlos Del Toro	Nadine Dorries; Luke Tryl; Rosena Allin-Khan	
4	5	64	4 February 2024	Gillian Keegan; Peter Kyle; Esther Ghey	Andrea Thompson; Richard Allan; Justine Greening	
4	6	65	11 February 2024	Michael Gove; Pat McFadden; Ralph Fiennes	Simon Schama; Victoria Newton; Kwajo Tweneboa	
4	7	66	18 February 2024	Michael Tomlinson; Matt Smith; Robin Simcox	Tracy-Ann Oberman; Douglas Alexander; Robert Buckland	
4	8	67	25 February 2024	Oliver Dowden; Lisa Nandy; Ed Davey; Kaja Kallas	Halima Begum; Andy Burnham; Thérèse Coffey	
4	9	68	3 March 2024	Jeremy Hunt; Bridget Phillipson; Mariano Janin	Rocco Forte; Vicky Spratt; Andy Haldane	
4	10	69	10 March 2024	Victoria Atkins; Rachel Reeves	Hugh Fearnley-Whittingstall; Michael Howard; Sharon White	
4	11	70	17 March 2024	Mark Harper; Jonathan Ashworth; Charles Spencer	Harriet Harman; Theo Paphitis; Samuel Kasumu	
4	12	71	24 March 2024	Jeremy Hunt; Anneliese Dodds; Paddy Harverson; Brian Cox	Armando Iannucci; Victoria Newton; Imran Ahmed	
4	13	72	7 April 2024	Oliver Dowden; David Lammy; Jens Stoltenberg	Mark Sedwill; Ruby Wax; Valerie Amos	
4	14	73	14 April 2024	Victoria Atkins; Yvette Cooper; Carla Denyer	Iain Duncan Smith; Bronwen Maddox; John O'Farrell	
4	15	74	21 April 2024	Claire Coutinho; Chris Stark; Shabana Mahmood	Chris Packham; Layla Moran; Luke Johnson	
4	16	75	28 April 2024	Chris Philp; Wes Streeting; Ed Davey; Nancy Pelosi	Robert Jenrick; Shami Chakrabarti; Ian Blackford	
4	17	76	5 May 2024	Mark Harper; Pat McFadden; Yolande Makolo; Suella Braverman	Paul Scully; Pippa Crerar; Jacqui Smith	
4	18	77	12 May 2024	David Cameron; Jonathan Ashworth; Dominic West	Nadhim Zahawi; Tina Brown; Zarah Sultana	
4	19	78	19 May 2024	Grant Shapps; Wes Streeting; Leonid Volkov	Piers Morgan; Mikaela Loach; David Ross	
4	20	79	26 May 2024	James Cleverly; Rachel Reeves	Allan Johnson; Nicky Morgan; Sharon White	
4	21	80	2 June 2024	Victoria Atkins; Yvette Cooper; Adrian Ramsay; Alina Habba	Andy Street; Shami Chakrabarti; Daisy Cooper	
4	22	81	9 June 2024	Mel Stride; Nigel Farage; Stephen Flynn	Amber Rudd; Matt Wrack; John Caudwell	
4	23	82	16 June 2024	Wes Streeting; Mark Harper; Ed Davey; Rhun ap Iorwerth	Andy Burnham; Nadine Dorries; Brian Cox	
4	24	83	23 June 2024	James Cleverly; Bridget Phillipson; John Swinney	Philip Hammond; Peter Mandelson; Susanna Reid	
4	25	84	30 June 2024	Rishi Sunak; Pat McFadden; Daisy Cooper; Stephen Flynn	Hugh Fearnley-Whittingstall; Harriet Harman; Brandon Lewis	
4	26	85	7 July 2024	Jonathan Reynolds; Andy Burnham; Robert Jenrick; Victoria Atkins; Ed Davey	Sharon Graham; Simon Schama; Michael Howard	
4	27	86	14 July 2024	Lucy Powell; Nigel Farage; Ben Houchen	Kim Leadbeater; Samuel Kasumu; Greg Jackson	
4	28	87	21 July 2024	Rachel Reeves; Jeremy Hunt	Jon Culshaw; Stephanie Flanders; Zarah Sultana	
4	29	88	28 July 2024	Steve Reed; Kit Harington; Olivia Washington	Alicia Kearns; Sharon White; Stephen Fry	
5	1	89	8 September 2024	Sir Keir Starmer; Tom Tugendhat; Kate Winslet	Victoria Newton; Pippa Crerar; Hugh Fearnley-Whittingstall	
5	2	90	15 September 2024	David Lammy; Sir Ed Davey; James Cleverly	Ben Whishaw; Lucian Msamati	
5	3	91	22 September 2024	Angela Rayner; Vladimir Kara-Murza; Evgenia Kara-Murza	Claire Ainsley; Richard Walker; Kwajo Tweneboa	
5	4	92	29 September 2024	Kemi Badenoch; Robert Jenrick; Pat McFadden; Rosie Duffield	Penny Mordaunt; Jake Berry; Thomas Fletcher	
5	5	93	6 October 2024	Tzipi Hotovely; Masoumeh Ebtekar; Peter Kyle; Andrew Mitchell	Zanny Minton Beddoes; Zarah Sultana; Malcolm Rifkind	
5	6	94	13 October 2024	John Swinney; Jonathan Reynolds; Robert Jenrick; Charlie Nunn	Brian Cox; Daisy Cooper; John Caudwell	
5	7	95	20 October 2024	Wes Streeting; Andrey Kelin; Kevin Hollinrake	Marc Warner; Shami Chakrabarti; Xand van Tulleken	
5	8	96	27 October 2024	Bridget Phillipson; Andrew Griffith; Steve Coogan Armando Iannucci	Valerie Amos; Andy Haldane; Rocco Forte	
5	9	97	3 November 2024	Rachel Reeves; Kemi Badenoch	Theo Paphitis; Jo Grady; Luke Tryl	
5	10	98	10 November 2024	Sir Tony Radakin; Darren Jones; Kristen Michal; Priti Patel; Damian Lewis	Tina Brown; Peter Mandelson; Andrew Roberts	
5	11	99	17 November 2024	Louise Haigh; Ed Davey; Chris Philp; Svitlana Hrynchuk	Dominic Raab; Carla Denyer; Tim Shipman	
5	12	100	24 November 2024	Liz Kendall; Jean-Noël Barrot; Frank Vandenbroucke; Kevin Hollinrake	Piers Morgan; Nadine Dorries; Jonathan Dimbleby	
5	13	101	1 December 2024	Pat McFadden; Victoria Atkins; Cate Blanchett; Guy Maddin	Diane Abbott; Hugh Fearnley-Whittingstall; Craig Mackinlay	
5	14	102	8 December 2024	Angela Rayner; Emma Pinchbeck; Richard Fuller	Ben Houchen; Jason Arday; Alison Phillips	
5	15	103	15 December 2024	Yvette Cooper; Chris Philp; Bret Taylor; Clay Bavor	Andy Burnham; Susanna Reid; James Reed	
6	1	104	5 January 2025	Nigel Farage; Wes Streeting; Chris Philp	Alan Johnson; Samuel Kasumu; Nicola Ranger	
6	2	105	12 January 2025	Peter Kyle; Mel Stride; Jason Oppenheim; Jerry Brown	Simon Schama; Ben Houchen; Tanni Grey-Thompson	
6	3	106	19 January 2025	Darren Jones; Priti Patel; Greg Swenson; Adam Roze; Sharone Lifschitz	Piers Morgan; Fiona Hill; Imran Ahmed	
6	4	107	26 January 2025	Rachel Reeves; Kemi Badenoch; Sir Paul McCartney	Beeban Kidron; Theo Paphitis; Nadhim Zahawi	
6	5	108	2 February 2025	Yvette Cooper; Ed Davey; Andrew Griffith	Mina Smallman; John Caudwell; Fraser Nelson	
6	6	109	9 February 2025	Angela Rayner; Isaac Herzog; Alex Burghart; Four bereaved parents suing TikTok	Greg Jackson; Gillian Keegan; Vicky Spratt	
6	7	110	16 February 2025	Jonathan Reynolds; Priti Patel; Ilan Gur	Adrian Ramsay; Richard Tice; Karin Von Hippel	
6	8	111	23 February 2025	Bridget Phillipson; James Cartlidge; William Hague; Margus Tsahkna	Stephen Fry; Simon Hart; Zanny Minton Beddoes	
6	9	112	2 March 2025	Keir Starmer; Kemi Badenoch; Ed Davey	Piers Morgan; Christiane Amanpour; Greg Swenson; Ivanna Klympush-Tsintsadze	
6	10	113	9 March 2025	Pat McFadden; Chris Philp; Richard Tice; Espen Barth Eide	Dan Snow; Penny Mordaunt; Luke Tryl	
6	11	114	16 March 2025	Wes Streeting; Laura Trott; Alexander Stubb	Susanna Reid; Steve Rigby; James Graham	
6	12	115	23 March 2025	Rachel Reeves; Mel Stride; Daisy Cooper	Sacha Lord; Anela Anwar; Robert Buckland	
6	13	116	30 March 2025	Justin Welby; Yvette Cooper; Alex Burghart	Jasvinder Sanghera; Jane Moore; Jason Arday	
6	14	117	6 April 2025	Kemi Badenoch; Darren Jones; Esther Ghey	Shevaun Haviland; Jeremy Vine; Emily Thornberry	
6	15	118	13 April 2025	Jonathan Reynolds; Andrew Griffith; Nigel Farage; Andrey Kelin	Gary Smith; Andy Street; Stephanie Flanders	
7	1	119	27 April 2025	Ed Davey; Kevin Hollinrake; Martin Freeman; Jack Lowden	Carla Denyer; Andy Burnham; Ben Houchen	
7	2	120	4 May 2025	Wes Streeting; Kemi Badenoch; Ed Davey; Zia Yusuf; Adrian Ramsay	Tina Brown; Christina McAnea; Justine Greening	
7	3	121	11 May 2025	Yvette Cooper; Chris Philp; Yungblud	Joseph Stiglitz; Sian Williams; Louis Mosley	
7	4	122	18 May 2025	Nick Thomas-Symonds; Alex Burghart; Elton John	Nick Ferrari; Rosena Allin-Khan; Calum Miller	
7	5	123	25 May 2025	Angela Rayner; Kemi Badenoch; Imelda Staunton; Bessie Carter	Zack Polanski; Jane Moore; Imran Ahmed	
7	6	124	1 June 2025	John Healey; Robert Jenrick; David Challen	Kiki McDonough; Shami Chakrabarti; Simon Case	
7	7	125	8 June 2025	Peter Kyle; Chris Philp; Richard Tice Arnold Schwarzenegger	Jeremy Hunt; Coco Khan; Dan Snow	
7	8	126	15 June 2025	Rachel Reeves; Mel Stride; Tzipi Hotovely; Reza Pahlavi; Hamidreza Gholamzadeh	Christiane Amanpour; John Browne; Hugh Fearnley-Whittingstall	
7	9	127	22 June 2025	Jonathan Reynolds; Isaac Herzog; Seyed Ali Mousavi	Tom Tugendhat; Zarah Sultana; Piers Morgan	
7	10	128	29 June 2025	Wes Streeting; Helen Whately; Rosie Jones; Ralph Fiennes; Dylan Moran	Ailbhe Rea; Matthew Taylor; Luke Tryl	
7	11	129	6 July 2025	Bridget Phillipson; Mel Stride; Mark Rowley	Daniel Kebede; Susanna Reid; James Harding	
7	12	130	13 July 2025	Heidi Alexander; Chris Philp; Melanie Dawes; Ncuti Gatwa; Edward Bluemel	Ian Russell; Kay Burley; Inaya Folarin Iman	
8	1	131	7 September 2025	John Healey; Kemi Badenoch; Nigel Farage; Mike Huckabee	Michael Gove; Emily Thornberry; Brian Cox	
8	2	132	14 September 2025	Peter Kyle; Laura Trott; Sky and Amanda Roberts	Piers Morgan; Christiane Amanpour; Rosena Allin-Khan	
8	3	133	21 September 2025	David Lammy; Ed Davey; Mel Stride; Husam Zomlot Alicia Vikander and Andrew Lincoln	Jack Thorne; Ava-Santina Evans; Malcolm Rifkind	
8	4	134	28 September 2025	Keir Starmer; James Cleverly; Greta Thunberg	Alan Johnson; Bell Ribeiro-Addy; Gary Smith	
8	5	135	5 October 2025	Kemi Badenoch; Shabana Mahmood	Penny Mordaunt; Lucy Powell; Ben Houchen	
8	6	136	12 October 2025	Jeremy Bowen; Bridget Phillipson; John Swinney; Priti Patel	Valerie Amos, Baroness Amos; Nadine Dorries; Rhun ap Iorwerth	
8	7	137	19 October 2025	Ed Miliband; Claire Coutinho; Zack Polanski	Jens Stoltenberg; Emily Maitlis; Adil Ray	
8	8	138	26 October 2025	Wes Streeting; Chris Philp; Kamala Harris	Marina Wheeler; Kay Burley; Mike Shear	
8	9	139	2 November 2025	John Healey; Kemi Badenoch; Zia Yusuf; Nigel Topping	Valentine Low; Jeremy Vine; Christina McAnea	
8	10	140	9 November 2025	Lisa Nandy; James Cartlidge; Richard Knighton; Megan Garcia and Matt Bergman; Bryan Cranston	Gina Neff; Chris Packham; Susanna Reid	
8	11	141	16 November 2025	Shabana Mahmood; Chris Philp; Ed Davey; Tony Hall	Paul Nowak; Mariella Frostrup; Steve Rigby	
8	12	142	23 November 2025	Heidi Alexander; Mel Stride; Zack Polanski; Joseph Fiennes and Richard Ratcliffe	Jeremy Hunt; Sharon Graham; Andy Haldane	
8	13	143	30 November 2025	Rachel Reeves; Kemi Badenoch; David Gandy	Abi Foster; Sharon White; Piers Morgan	
8	14	144	7 December 2025	Pat McFadden; Helen Whately; Zarah Sultana	Ava-Santina Evans; James Reed; Lawrence Newport	
8	15	145	14 December 2025	Shabana Mahmood; Chris Philp; Mary-Ann Stephenson; Kate Winslet, Toni Collette and Andrea Riseborough	Josh Babarinde; Laila Cunningham; Joanna Scanlan	
9	1	146	4 January 2026	Keir Starmer	Grant Shapps; Layla Moran; Nadine Dorries	
9	2	147	11 January 2026	Kemi Badenoch; Peter Mandelson; Heidi Alexander	Zanny Minton Beddoes; Gloria De Piero; Louis Mosley	
9	3	148	18 January 2026	Lisa Nandy; Richard Tice; Mike Johnson	Jeremy Hunt; Tracy Brabin; Kay Burley	
9	4	149	25 January 2026	Shabana Mahmood; Ed Davey; Andy Street; Esther Ghey and Ellen Roome	Jonathan Haidt; Greg Swenson; Shami Chakrabarti	
9	5	150	1 February 2026	Steve Reed; Zack Polanski; Hugh Bonneville	Tom Tugendhat; John Bew; Angela Rippon	
9	6	151	8 February 2026	Pat McFadden; Alex Burghart; Rhun ap Iorwerth	Steve Wright; Rosena Allin-Khan; Victoria Newton	
9	7	152	15 February 2026	Yvette Cooper; Priti Patel; Hilary Cass	Billy Bragg; Emily Thornberry; Jake Berry	
9	8	153	22 February 2026	Bridget Phillipson; Laura Trott; Boris Johnson; Tony Radakin	Joanne Thomas; Richard Coles; Geordie Greig	
9	9	154	1 March 2026	John Healey Priti Patel Zack Polanski Clive Myrie Tracey Emin	Rana Rahimpour; Bronwen Maddox; Alan Johnson	
9	10	155	8 March 2026	Yvette Cooper Seyed Ali Mousavi Tom Fletcher Robert Jenrick John Swinney	Penny Mordaunt; Zarah Sultana; Christiane Amanpour	
9	11	156	15 March 2026	Ed Miliband; Claire Coutinho; Ed Davey; Self Esteem	Piers Morgan; Tina Brown; Sharon White	
9	12	157	22 March 2026	Steve Reed; James Cleverly; Chris O'Shea; Volodymyr Zelenskyy	Nick Ferrari; Karin von Hippel; Stephen Flynn	
9	13	158	29 March 2026	Bridget Phillipson; Kemi Badenoch; Zia Yusuf; Jay Edelson	Michael Gove; Liz Saville Roberts; Eddie Marsan	
10	1	159	12 April 2026	Wes Streeting; Ed Davey Lyse Doucet; Tucker Carlson; James Cartlidge Tarek Mitri Peter Capaldi	Alex Younger; Mary Beard; Kay Burley	
10	2	160	19 April 2026	Liz Kendall; Alex Burghart Robert Jenrick; The leaders of Scottish political parties	Matt Clifford; Helen MacNamara; Faiza Shaheen	
10	3	161	26 April 2026	Darren Jones; Chris Philp; The leaders of Welsh political parties	Kim Darroch; Susanna Reid; Brian Cox	
10	4	162	3 May 2026	Heidi Alexander; Kemi Badenoch; Zack Polanski	Carmen Smith; Lisa Smart; Shirley-Anne Somerville	
10	5	163	10 May 2026	Bridget Phillipson; Catherine West; James Cleverly; Richard Tice Rhun ap Iorwerth	Sharon Graham; Jeremy Vine; Nadine Dorries	
10	6	164	17 May 2026	Lisa Nandy Kemi Badenoch; Jess Phillips; Luke Tryl	Josh Simons; Jo Coburn; Will Self	
10	7	165	24 May 2026	Darren Jones; Alan Milburn; Robert Jenrick	Rachel de Souza; Vicky Spratt; James Reed	
10	8	166	31 May 2026	Nicola Sturgeon; Pat McFadden; Chris Philp	Jeremy Hunt; Rosena Allin-Khan; Aasmah Mir	
10	9	167	7 June 2026	David Lammy; Claire Coutinho; Zia Yusuf	Josh Babarinde; Kay Burley; Jacob Rees-Mogg	
10	10	168	14 June 2026	Lisa Nandy; James Cartlidge; Ed Davey	Al Carns; Beeban Kidron; Richard Madeley	
10	11	169	21 June 2026	Peter Kyle; Mel Stride; Paul Ovenden; Simon Case John Hutton	Jess Phillips; Toby Perkins; Luke Charters	
10	12	170	28 June 2026	Lucy Powell; Steve Reed; James Cleverly; Tony Radakin	Piers Morgan; Sharon White; Joanne Thomas	
10	13	171	5 July 2026	James Murray; David Blunkett; Robert Jenrick	Christiane Amanpour; Michael Gove; Steph Driver	
10	14	172	12 July 2026	Rachel Reeves; Mel Stride	Richard Moth; Miatta Fahnbulleh; Nadhim Zahawi	
10	15	173	19 July 2026	Lucy Powell; Kemi Badenoch	Tracy Brabin; Jacob Rees-Mogg; Kate Garraway	
25 July 2026	Andy Burmham	Laura Kuenssberg<note>presented by Martine Croxall with Kuenssberg interviewing Burham				
