= Kasumu =

Kasumu is a surname. Notable people with the surname include:

- David Kasumu (born 1999), English professional footballer
- Samuel Kasumu, British special adviser

== See also ==
- Kasur
