= Siddeley =

Siddeley may mean:

- Siddeley-Deasy, a British automobile, engine and aircraft company based in Coventry in the early 20th century
- Hawker Siddeley, a group of British manufacturing companies engaged in aircraft production
- Armstrong Siddeley, a British engineering group that operated during the first half of the 20th century
- John Siddeley, 1st Baron Kenilworth, a captain of the automobile industry in Britain
