= St Mark's Academy =

St Mark's Church of England Academy

Location
- Acacia Road; Mitcham, Greater London, CR4 1SF; England; 51.40764°N 0.15193°W

Information
- Type: Academy
- Motto: A community founded on love, hope and trust.
- Religious affiliation: Church of England
- Trust: CfBT Schools Trust
- Department for Education URN: 134003 Tables
- Ofsted: Reports
- Principal: Aimee Gallagher
- Gender: Mixed
- Age: 11 to 18
- Website: http://www.stmarksacademy.com/

St Mark's Academy is a mixed Church of England secondary school and sixth form located in the Eastfields area of the London Borough of Merton, England.

It was first established in 1960 as Eastfields High School for boys. The school became coeducational in 2002 and was renamed Mitcham Vale School. In 2006 the school was converted to academy status and was renamed St Mark's Academy. The academy is sponsored by Anthem Schools Trust and the Anglican Diocese of Southwark.

St Mark's Academy operates Year 7 to Sixth form. GCSEs, BTECs and OCR Nationals as programmes of study for pupils, while students in the sixth form have the option to study from range of A Levels and additional BTECs. The school specialises in science and the performing arts, and has dedicated resources to support the specialisms.

The School has recently (October 2014) been awarded the prestigious International Values Quality Mark in recognition of its values-based ethos and character.

After an Ofsted inspection in May 2024, St Mark’s Academy was graded as an outstanding school.

== Notable former pupils ==
- Dave, grime and rap artist
- Ramz, rapper and musician
- Kwajo Tweneboa, activist and writer
