= SW Radio Africa =

- London; United Kingdom
- Broadcast area: United Kingdom; Zimbabwe
- Frequency: 4880 kHz shortwave

Programming
- Format: Talk radio

Links
- Webcast: Archives
- Website: Official Site

SW Radio Africa was an independent Zimbabwe radio station that broadcast from London, England, from 19 December 2001 to 10 August 2014.

== Approach ==
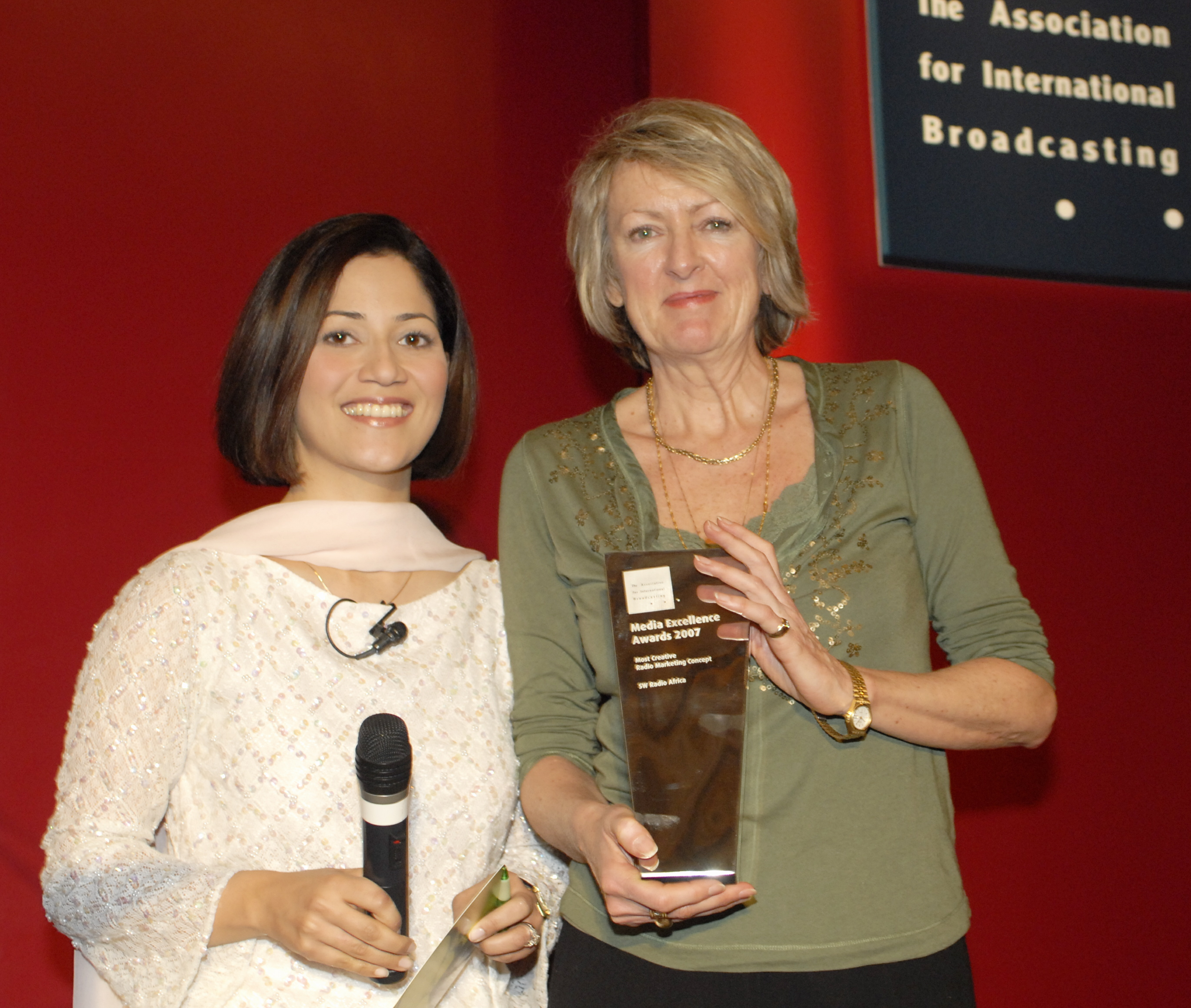
Gerry Jackson receiving a Media Excellence award for creativity from Mishal Husain at the Association for International Broadcasting in 2007

It was founded by Gerry Jackson. With the government of Robert Mugabe keeping a tight rein on the local airwaves, the station produced and presented news and current affairs programmes for broadcast in Zimbabwe on short wave and on the Internet. Programme content covered the decline of the agricultural sector due to government sponsored farm invasions, the ever-increasing currency hyper-inflation and the effect that HIV and AIDS was having on the population. Much of the content comprised pre-recorded but unedited, international telephone conversations between the presenter and people in Zimbabwe. These untrained members of the public gave their report of happenings, often as they were going down. The unedited form that gave the content legitimacy among the listeners. The news broadcasts were considered more factual than those of the state broadcaster. Staffed and run by black and white Zimbabweans in exile, it aimed to promote democracy and free speech, and to counter the mis-information and hate speech broadcast as propaganda, by the government-controlled Radio and TV stations. The station's website, www.swradioafrica.com, featured live online streaming, as well as archived broadcasts.

Broadcasts were typically for just 2 or 3 hours each evening.

== Technical details ==
The two studios of the station were housed in an office building in Borehamwood, where the journalist staff compiled telephone recordings during the day. These recordings were then inserted into the live programmes broadcast each evening. The signal was sent from the studio via ISDN lines, then transmitted via satellite to a location in South Africa, and re-broadcast on Shortwave into Zimbabwe. During sensitive times of elections etc, the Zimbabwe government tried to block the signal by jamming with its own shortwave facilities. At such times SW Radio Africa would broadcast on two frequencies simultaneously as the Government could only jam one frequency at a time.

== In popular culture ==
In The Last Resort: A Memoir of Zimbabwe (Chapter 4), journalist Douglas Rogers says of two of his parents' employees: "It was only later that I learned the two Johns were fervent MDC supporters and had been for years. It was one of the reasons my father kept them both on. He enjoyed speaking to them about politics, and it was why he had given them his old shortwave radio: so that they could tune into SW Africa, the pro-democracy station that broadcast out of London."
