= Baron Kenilworth =

Barony in the Peerage of the United Kingdom

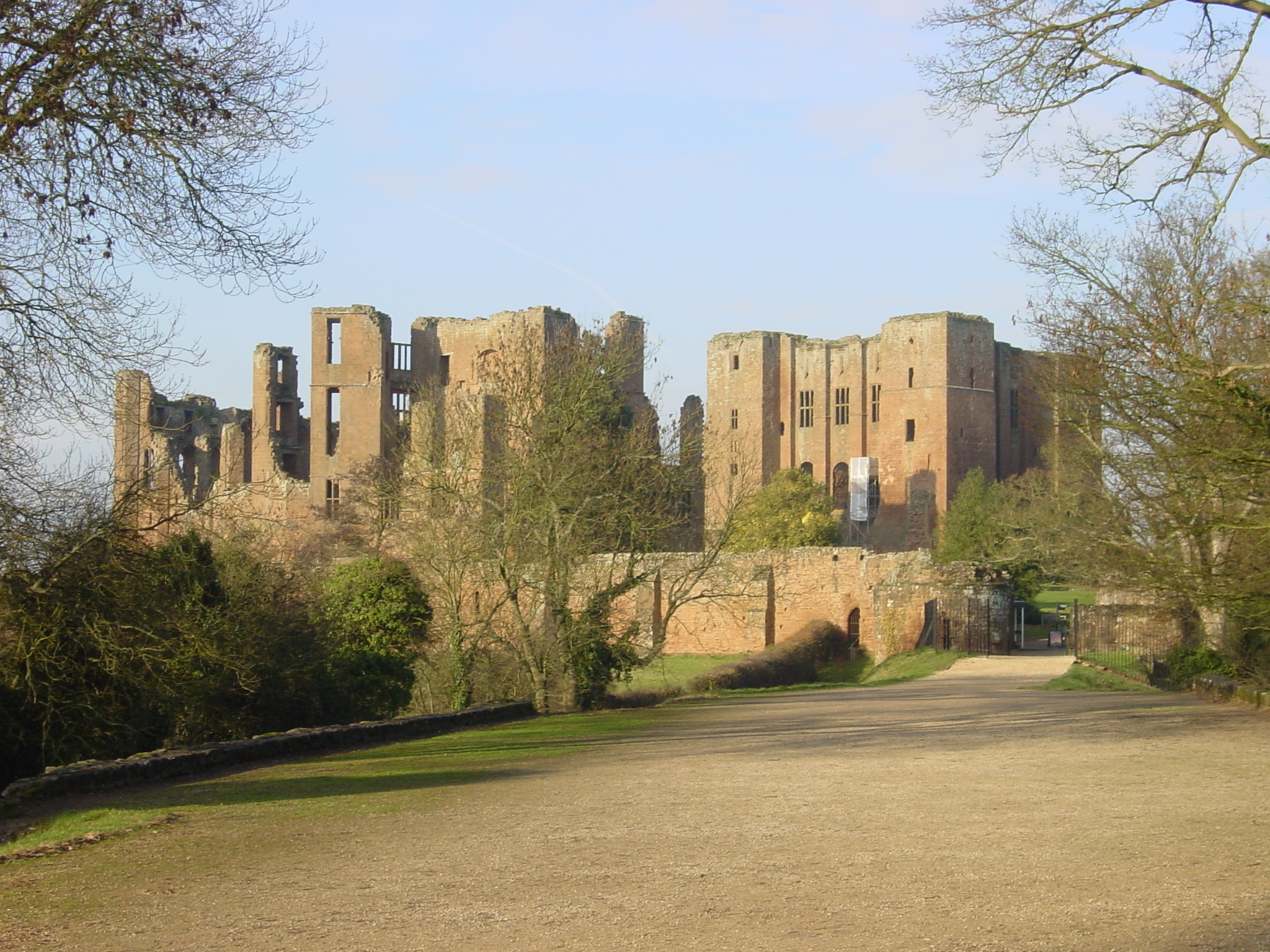
Kenilworth Castle

Baron Kenilworth, of Kenilworth in the County of Warwick, is a title in the Peerage of the United Kingdom. It was created in 1937 for the motor industry magnate Sir John Siddeley. His grandson, the third Baron, was an interior designer and the founder of John Siddeley International Ltd. As of 2010 the title is held by the latter's son, the fourth Baron, who succeeded in 1981.

The first Baron purchased Kenilworth Castle in 1937. The house is now in the care of English Heritage.

== Barons Kenilworth (1937) ==
- John Davenport Siddeley, 1st Baron Kenilworth (1866–1953)
- Cyril Davenport Siddeley, 2nd Baron Kenilworth (1894–1971)
- John Tennant Davenport Siddeley, 3rd Baron Kenilworth (1924–1981)
- John Randle Siddeley, 4th Baron Kenilworth (b. 1954)

The heir apparent is the present holder's son Hon. William Randle Siddeley (b. 1992).

== Arms ==
Coat of arms of Baron Kenilworth

Crest
Issuant out of the battlements of a tower a goat's head Argent armed Or in front of a rising sun also issuant Gold.
Escutcheon
Per chevron Or and Azure in chief two goats' heads erased and in base a triangular castle with three towers on a chief of the second two wings conjoined in fess all counterchanged.
Supporters
On either side a goat Or gorged with a collar Azure pendant therefrom by a chain Gold an escutcheon chequy of the first and second, a chief Ermine.
Motto
Nitendo (By Striving)
