= Oli Dugmore =

UK political journalist

Oli Dugmore is a journalist and broadcaster who has been the executive digital editor of the New Statesman since 2025. He has appeared frequently on UK television as political commentator, and is a radio presenter on LBC with a weekly slot. Prior to October 2025, he was the head of PoliticsJOE, through which he interviewed individuals such as Bernie Sanders, Jeremy Corbyn, Yanis Varoufakis, Ian Hislop, Sadiq Kahn and Rory Stewart. He has been a pundit on several BBC political, current affairs and media shows, including on TV Newsnight, Sunday with Laura Kuenssberg and Question Time, as well as Jeremy Vine on Radio 2 and Amol Rajan on Radio 4.

== Education ==
Dugmore attended Warwick School between 2002 and 2012. He studied politics at Cardiff University and was a writer and assistant editor of the student news site The Tab in the early 2010s. One feature for The Tab was his and fellow student journalist Bob Palmer's visit to a tanning salon.

== Career ==
Prior to Joe, Dugmore was a content editor at LBC, and a sub-editor at the sports team for The Sunday Times.

=== PoliticsJOE ===
Between 2018 and October 2025, Dugmore founded and was head of news and politics at the Joe website and the associated PoliticsJOE YouTube channel. Here, Dugmore was the interviewer on the Joe podcast Unfiltered, succeeding James O'Brien. In this podcast, Dugmore interviewed individuals including Carol Vorderman, Gary Lineker and Rory Stewart. He also hosted another regular podcast, Pubcast, alongside Ava Santina and Ed Campbell, discussing UK and world issues. Dugmore was responsible, alongside his team, for the most popular and most shared UK political video of 2019, about the National Health Service, which gained 40 million views. He was interviewed on BBC Radio 4's The Media Show by Amol Rajan in 2019, discussing the future of political coverage, alongside Piers Morgan.

Dugmore was nominated for 2020 Journalist of the Year by the UK The Drum in their Online Media Awards. Dugmore was nominated for the 2020 Politics award by the Press Gazette. In May 2022, Dugmore attracted controversy with an egg-throwing stand next to the stature of former PM Margaret Thatcher. He interviewed Ian Hislop for the Private Eye Review of the Year in 2022, 2023 and 2024. He appeared several times as a panellist on BBC's Sunday with Laura Kuenssberg, including on 19 March 2023 discussing media influence on youth and other matters, and on 16 July. From July 2023, Dugmore had a regular weekend chat radio slot presenting at LBC. He had previously appeared as a panelist on Iain Dale's LBC show. He was on the finalists list for the 2023 Up-and-Coming Broadcast Journalist of the Year award with Pagefield. In April 2024, he spoke at Cambridge Union, closing out the opposition to "Modern Technology Will Destroy Liberal Democracy". The same month, he spoke at the Oxford Union in favour of the proposition "populism is a threat to democracy", alongside Nancy Pelosi. There were protests from supporters of Palestine near the event.

Dugmore appeared on the BBC's Politics Live on 9 January 2025. In June, he oversaw a move by PoliticsJOE to place their podcast videos behind a Patreon paywall, which he described as a "freemium" strategy and stated was a decision partly driven by concerns around platform instability. In September, in the wake of the Terminally Ill Adults (End of Life) Bill, Dugmore wrote the article "Let them die: the case for assisted dying" for the New Statesman, in which he argued that assisted dying could mitigate mounting costs associated with the UK's ageing population such as pensions, the NHS and social care. This article was criticised by campaigners from Care Not Killing, MP Carla Lockhart, and The Daily Telegraph.

=== New Statesman executive digital editor ===
Dugmore became the executive digital editor of the New Statesman in 2025.

In February 2026, he appeared on Question Time, where he made a speech critical of the Labour Party's prior appointment of Peter Mandelson as US ambassador, when it was known that Mandelson was a friend of child sex offender Jeffrey Epstein. Another appearance on Question Time in October 2026 led to a spat with Suella Braverman on X.
