= Kiki McDonough =

British jewellery designer

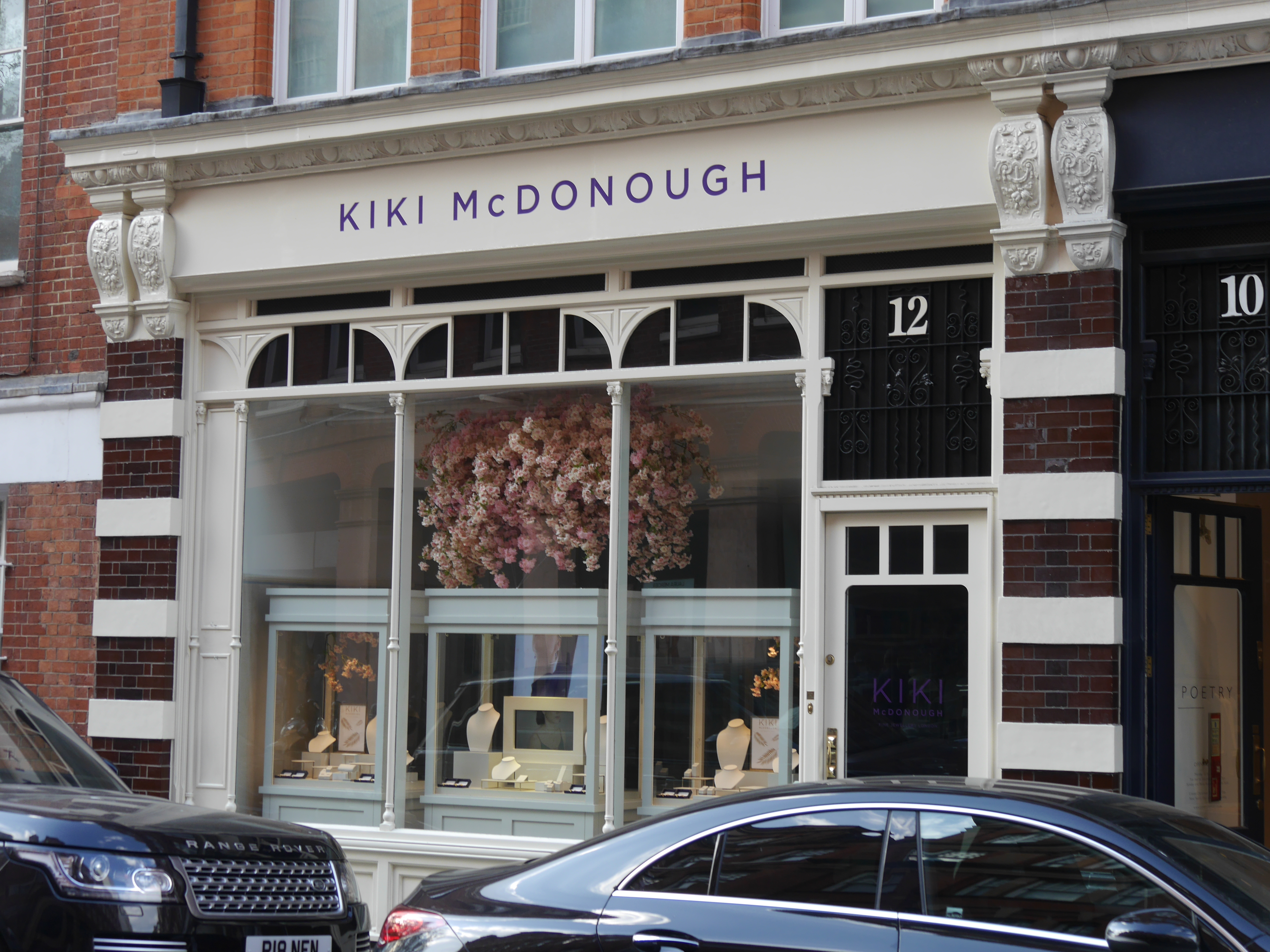
- Symons Street London store, April 2022
- Other name: Lady Caroline Kenilworth
- Occupation: Jewellery designer
- Spouse: John Randle Siddeley, 4th Baron Kenilworth (divorced)
- Children: 2 sons

Kiki McDonough is a British jewellery designer, credited with introducing coloured gemstones to the British jewellery scene. She owns a shop off Sloane Square in Chelsea, and her jewellery is in the collection of the Victoria and Albert Museum in Kensington.

== Early life ==
Kiki McDonough was born to a French mother and English father and raised just off the King's Road in Chelsea. She is a fifth-generation jeweller and her father was the owner of an antique jewellery shop on Bond Street in London.

== Career ==
McDonough trained as a secretary and her first job was in the fashion room at British Vogue. She went on to have several other positions including working for SAS founder David Stirling and a brief spell as a party planner.

McDonough started designing jewellery in 1985 and opened a concession in her friend's boutique in Mayfair. She opened her own shop on Elizabeth Street in 1989 and moved it to Walton Street in 1992. In 2007, she opened a shop on Symons Street off Sloane Square in Chelsea.

McDonough credits Diana, Princess of Wales, with catapulting her brand into the spotlight, as she began wearing Kiki McDonough jewellery in the 1990s.

Colourful gemstones are what Kiki McDonough is best known for. She also introduced the concept of detachable earrings to the British jewellery market.

A pair of crystal heart earrings, designed by McDonough, is part of the modern jewellery collection at the Victoria and Albert Museum. Catherine, Princess of Wales and Queen Camilla are often seen wearing their Kiki pieces.In April 2026, Kiki McDonough was granted the honour of a Royal Warrant by appointment to Her Majesty Queen Camilla.

McDonough is a business mentor for the King's Trust.

Kiki McDonough's biography Kiki McDonough, A Life of Colour, was published in 2025 by Papadakis to coincide with the 40th anniversary of the brand.

== Personal life ==
McDonough is divorced from John Randle Siddeley, 4th Baron Kenilworth. They have two sons, William and Edward.

McDonough likes Liverpool F.C. and ballet.
