= Association for International Broadcasting =

Trade group of television and radio companies

- Founded: 1993; 33 years ago
- Headquarters: Kent, United Kingdom
- Key people: Carlson Huang (Chairperson)
- Website: aib.org.uk

The Association for International Broadcasting (AIB) is a non-profit, non-governmental trade association that represents international television and radio broadcasters and online broadcasters, founded in 1993. It is governed by an Executive Committee of six members elected from the AIB's membership. The AIB's Secretariat is located in Kent, in the United Kingdom.

== Activities ==
Key areas of activity include:

- media freedom
- cyber security
- sustainability
- regulatory affairs

The AIB has a large collection of data about broadcasting and electronic media covering territories throughout the world.

== Awards ==
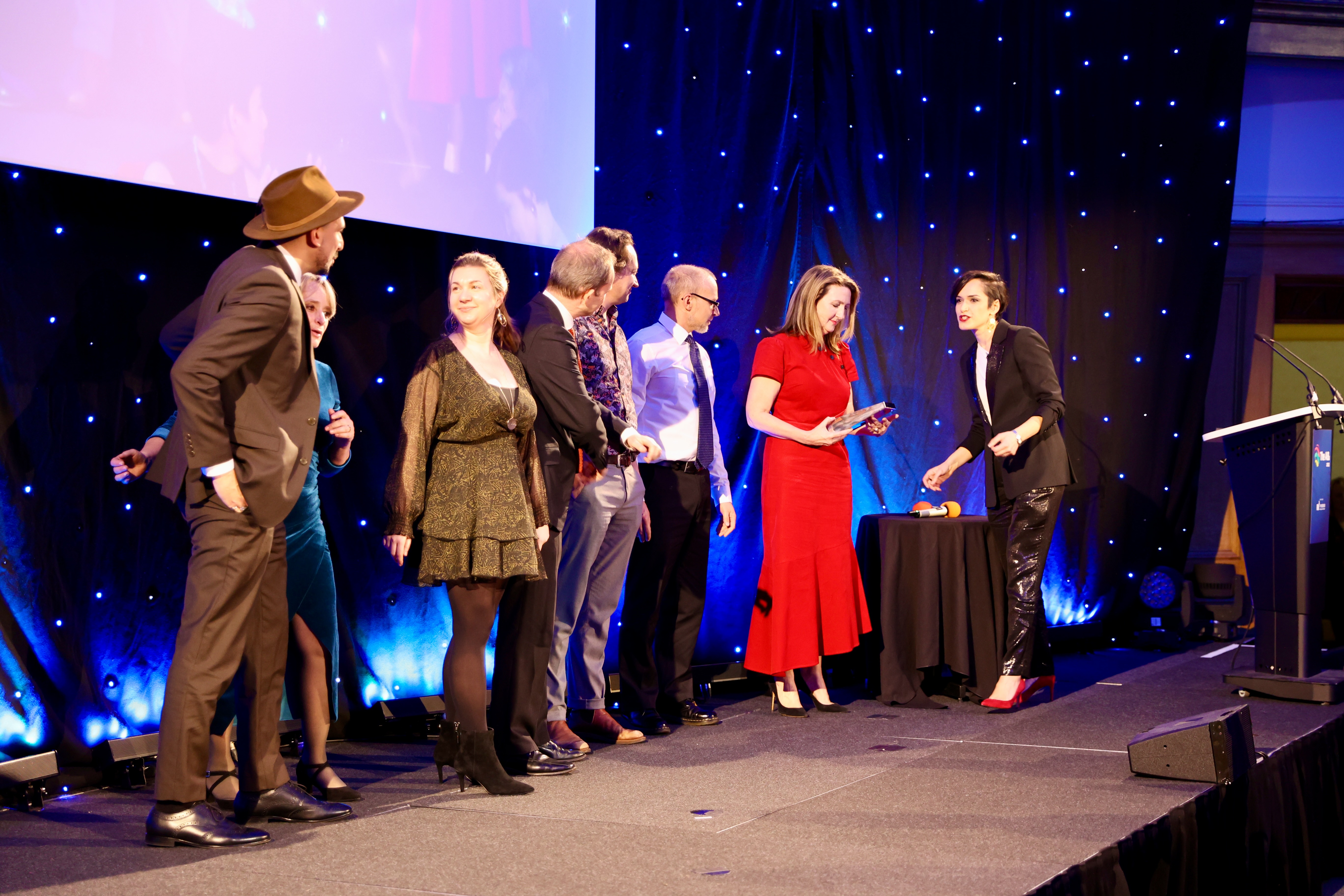

The AIB International Media Excellence Awards (AIBs) were created in 2005 by the association. The AIBs recognise excellence in the international broadcasting industry with a focus on journalism and factual productions across TV, radio and digital platforms. The AIBs attract entries from broadcasters all over the world. In 2023, over 400 hours of content were entered into the AIBs by broadcasters and production companies in 23 countries and in multiple languages across 19 categories.

In addition to programming, the AIBs regularly include award categories the reward organisations, such as Channel of the Year and News Agency of the Year. The AIBs are presented each November at a ceremony in London. Hosts of the AIBs over its 19 years include Mishal Husain, Francine Lacqua, Hala Gorani, Annabel Croft, Matthew Amroliwala, and Rana Rahimpour.

== Members ==
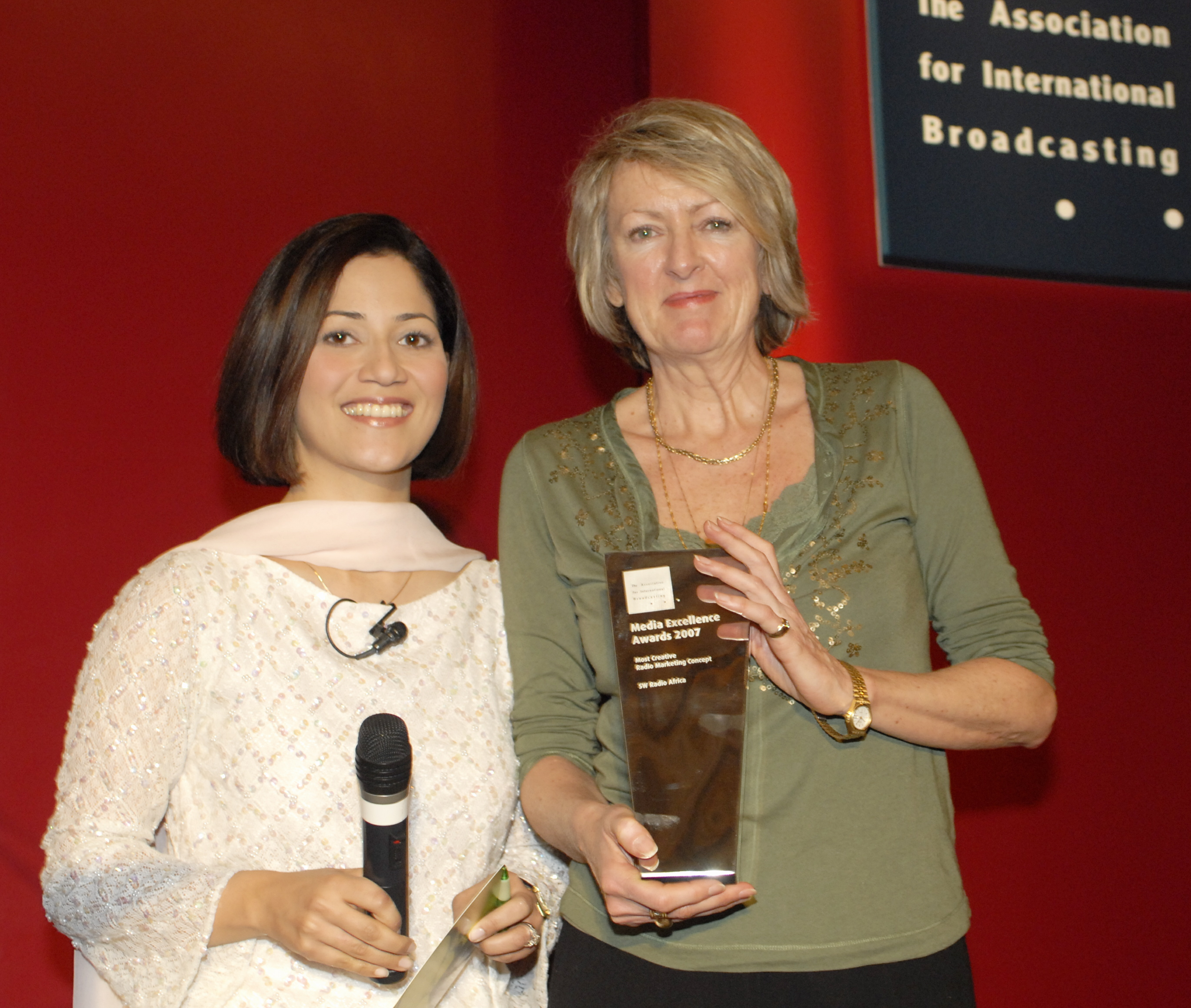
Gerry Jackson of SW Radio Africa receiving a Media Excellence award for creativity from Mishal Husain in 2007

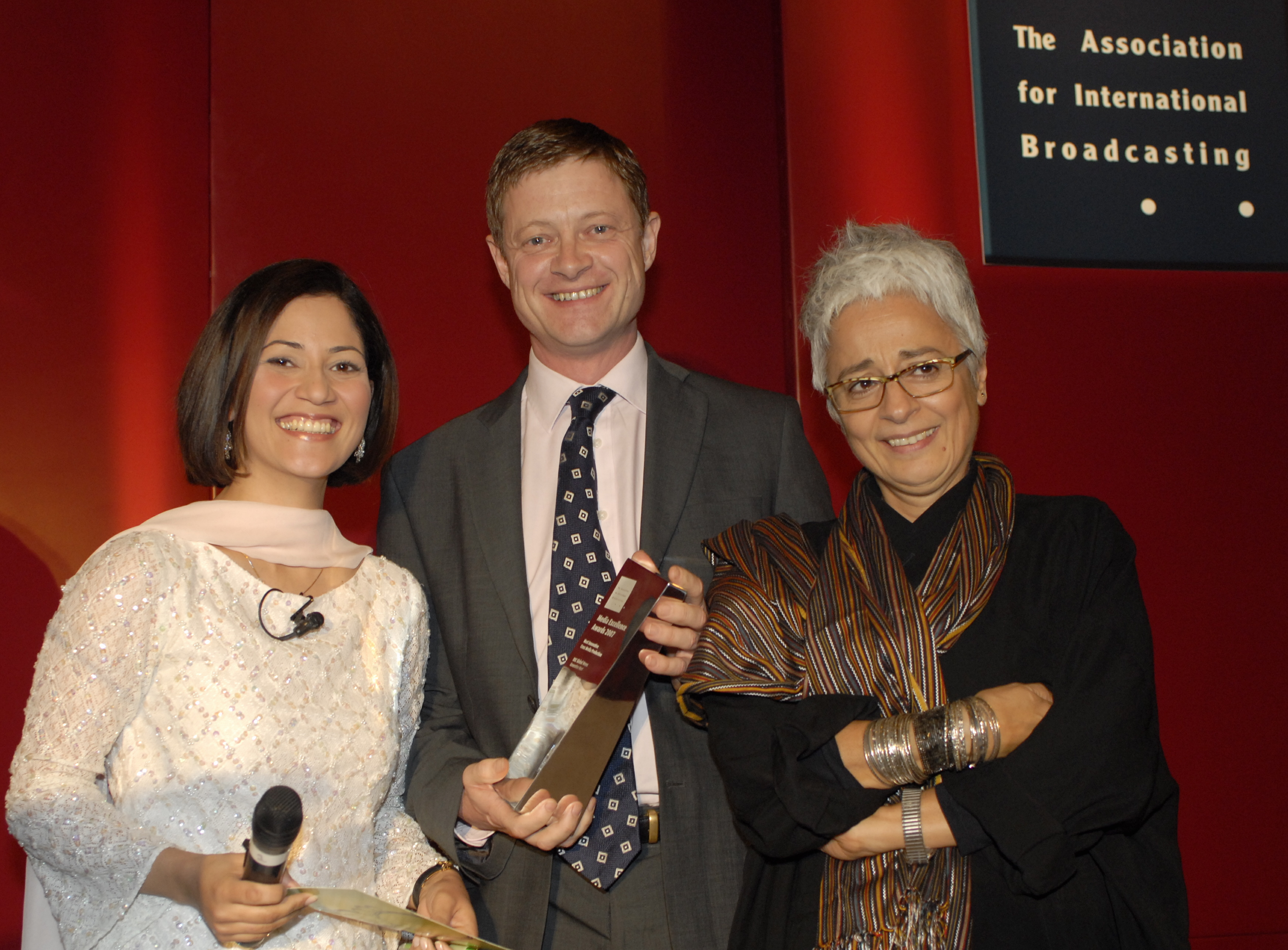
Mishal Husain, Richard Porter and Liliane Landor at an AIB awards evening in 2007

The following broadcasters, organisations, companies and TV and radio channels are members of the AIB.

| Region/Territory | Name | Status |
|---|---|---|
| Asia-Pacific (headquartered in Malaysia) | Asia-Pacific Broadcasting Union | Broadcasting association |
| Australia | Australian Broadcasting Corporation | Public, TV/radio |
| Canada | Canadian Broadcasting Corporation | Public, TV/radio |
| China | Phoenix Television | Partially state-owned, TV |
| France | France Médias Monde | State-owned, TV/radio |
| Germany | Deutsche Welle | Public, TV/radio |
| Germany | SchmitsPartners | Law firm |
| India | Prasar Bharati | Public, TV/radio |
| India | TV9 Network | Private, TV |
| Japan | NHK World-Japan | Public, TV/radio |
| New Zealand | RNZ International | Public, radio |
| Nigeria | Channels TV | Private, TV |
| Pakistan | Geo TV | Private, TV |
| Pakistan | Hum Network | Private, TV |
| Qatar | Al Jazeera Media Network | State-funded |
| Romania | Antena 3 | Private, TV |
| Romania | Radio Romania International | Public, radio |
| Russia | RT (Russia Today) | State-owned, TV |
| Russia | Ruptly | News agency, owned by RT |
| Saudi Arabia | Al Arabiya | TV/radio |
| Singapore | CNA (Channel NewsAsia) | State-funded, TV |
| Taiwan | Radio Taiwan International | Public, radio |
| Turkey | TRT World | State-owned, TV |
| United Kingdom | Arqiva | Telecommunications company |
| United Kingdom | BBC News | Public, TV/radio |
| United Kingdom | Iran International | Private, TV |
| United States | Bloomberg Television | Private, TV |
| United States | Shure | Audio products company |
| United States | U.S. Agency for Global Media | Government agency, TV/radio |
