= Salma Shah =

British political commentator and former special adviser

- Occupations: commentator, special adviser

Ommasalma Shah (born July 1984) is a British political commentator and consultant known professionally as Salma Shah. She worked as special adviser to former Conservative Home Secretary Sajid Javid for five years covering four different departments.

She has been a director of Kraken Strategy Limited since 2019, and is a Policy Fellow alumna of Centre for Science and Policy. She is also a Trustee of the think tank Policy Exchange.

== Early life ==
Shah was born in July 1984 in the United Kingdom to parents who immigrated from Pakistan and India.

== Career ==
Shah worked for Alan Duncan who was then a member of the Conservative Party Shadow Cabinet as an adviser and then a press officer for the Conservative Party. From 2014, she was a producer at the BBC helping to produce the Today programme on Radio 4. Shah worked as a special adviser in the Conservative government, specialising in public policy.

She worked for Sajid Javid across four Government departments. She started working for him at the Department of Culture, Media, and Sport The Department for Business, Innovation and Skills and the Ministry of Housing, Communities and Local Government She was a special adviser to Sajid Javid when he was in office as Home Secretary.

She departed from government in 2019, when Boris Johnson became Prime Minister.

She then worked in the private sector for Portland Communications. In 2022, she joined Mitie as a non-executive director and as a media political commentator, she has also been a commentator on police reform and English devolution. Shah has been awarded for her role as a company board director winning the Sunday Times Non-Executive Director to Watch award in 2024 She is a fellow of the Centre for Science and Policy.

In her post-Government career, Shah was a columnist for The Independent.

Shah is a regular panellist on shows including Sophy Ridge on Sunday Good Morning Britain, Sunday with Laura Kuenssberg and BBC Politics Live. She appeared on Have I Got News for You on 10 October 2025 and 23 October 2026.

== Personal life ==
Her husband Andrew Smith served as lord mayor of Westminster from 2021 to 2022
