= Samuel Kasumu =

British special adviser

- Education: Brunel University of London
- Occupations: commentator, special adviser
- Website: samuelkasumu.co.uk

Samuel Kasumu is a British politician, commentator and former special adviser.

== Early life and education ==
Kasumu was born in St Mary’s Hospital, Paddington and grew up in Barnet. Kasumu studied accounting and finance at Brunel University.

== Career ==
Kasumu came to prominence as a campaigner and entrepreneur. He was a member of trustees including Elevation Networks. He is co-founder of Inclusive Boards which promotes diversity in the workplace. He was a Community Engagement Advisory board member for the 2012 Summer Olympics in London. He stood for London Conservatives in Croydon North in the 2017 general election. He came in second place behind Steve Reed.

Samuel Kasumu worked as special adviser in the Conservative government, joining in 2019 when Boris Johnson became Prime Minister. From 2019 to 2021, he was the most senior Black advisor in the Prime Minister's Office. He specialised in policies on civil society and communities. He was involved in the COVID-19 vaccination programme.

In 2021, Kasumu resigned after disagreements surrounding a government-commissioned report on racial issues. He accused the Conservative Party of pursuing "a politics steeped in division". Kasumu was a Conservative Party member of Welwyn Hatfield Borough Council. Kasumu stood to be the Conservative candidate in the 2024 London mayoral election. He announced his candidacy in October 2022. He was endorsed by leading politicians including Steve Baker, Grant Shapps, Priti Patel and Nadine Dorries. He was also endorsed by the father of Damilola Taylor. He campaigned opposing the Ultra Low Emission Zone expansion. He was not longlisted and Susan Hall was chosen instead.

Kasumu is a regular panellist on shows including Question Time, Sunday with Laura Kuenssberg and BBC Politics Live.

== Personal life ==
Kasumu is married. They lived in Laindon. He is Christian.

== Bibliography ==
- The Power of the Outsider: A Journey of Discovery
