= Randle Siddeley, 4th Baron Kenilworth =

British aristocrat and garden designer (born 1954)

John Randle Siddeley, 4th Baron Kenilworth (born 16 June 1954), is a British aristocrat and garden designer.

== Early life ==
John Randle Siddeley was born on 16 June 1954. He is the fourth Baron Kenilworth, and is styled as The Rt Hon the Lord Kenilworth.

== Career ==
He is a garden and landscape designer who operates offices in London, New York, Canada and Hong Kong.

== Arms ==
Coat of arms of Randle Siddeley, 4th Baron Kenilworth

Crest
Issuant out of the battlements of a tower a goat's head Argent armed Or in front of a rising sun also issuant Gold.
Escutcheon
Per chevron Or and Azure in chief two goats' heads erased and in base a triangular castle with three towers on a chief of the second two wings conjoined in fess all counterchanged.
Supporters
On either side a goat Or gorged with a collar Azure pendant therefrom by a chain Gold an escutcheon chequy of the first and second, a chief Ermine.
Motto
Nitendo (By Striving)

Peerage of the United Kingdom
Preceded by John Siddeley	Baron Kenilworth; 1981–present	Incumbent; Heir apparent: Hon. William Siddeley
