= John Siddeley, 1st Baron Kenilworth =

British motor industry pioneer (1866–1953)

The Right Honourable The Lord Kenilworth CBE
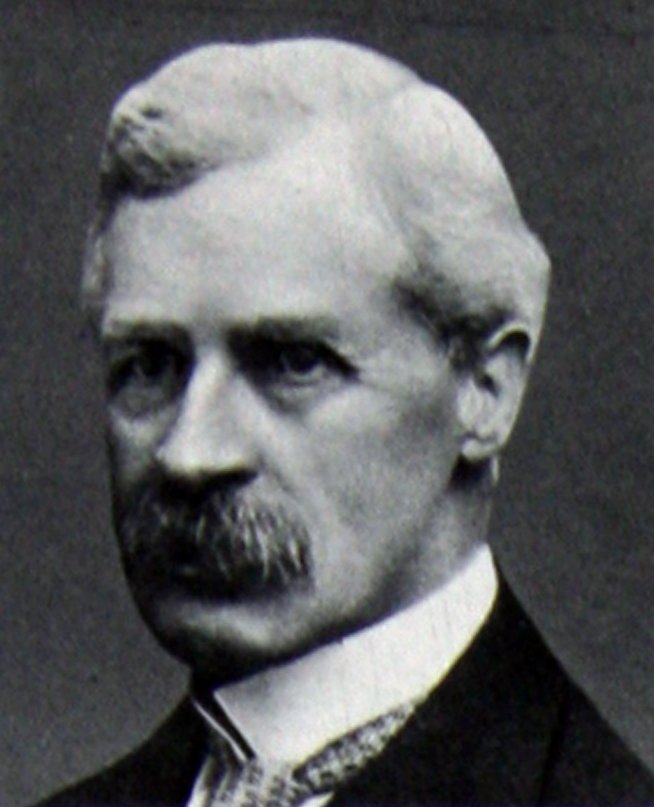
- Born: John Davenport Siddeley; 5 August 1866; Longsight, Manchester, England, United Kingdom of Great Britain and Ireland
- Died: 3 November 1953 (aged 87); Jersey
- Spouse: Sarah Mabel Goodier
- Children: 3 sons and 2 daughters

John Davenport Siddeley, 1st Baron Kenilworth CBE (5 August 1866 – 3 November 1953), was a pioneer of the motor industry in the United Kingdom, manufacturing aero engines and airframes as well as motor vehicles.

== Career ==
The eldest son of William Siddeley and his wife born Elizabeth Davenport, J D Siddeley was born in Longsight, Manchester in 1866. At first he worked for his father as an apprentice hosier but took night classes in draughting. In 1892, the young man, who had become a bicycle racer and designer, was hired as a draughtsman by the Humber Cycle Company. The then managing director of Dunlop picked him out at Humber and hired Siddeley as Dunlop's Belfast sales manager. In 1900 as managing director of Dunlop's Midlands subsidiary Clipper Tyre Company he gained prominence in the motor industry by driving a 6 hp Daimler car through England's Thousand Miles Trial with marked success. This followed cycling from Land's End to John o' Groats to publicise the new pneumatic tyre.

He married Sarah Mabel Goodier, daughter of James Goodier of Macclesfield, in 1893 and they lived in Belfast for a short time, but by August 1894 they were living in Meriden, Coventry where their eldest son, Cyril, was born. They were to have three sons and two daughters.

== Motorcars ==
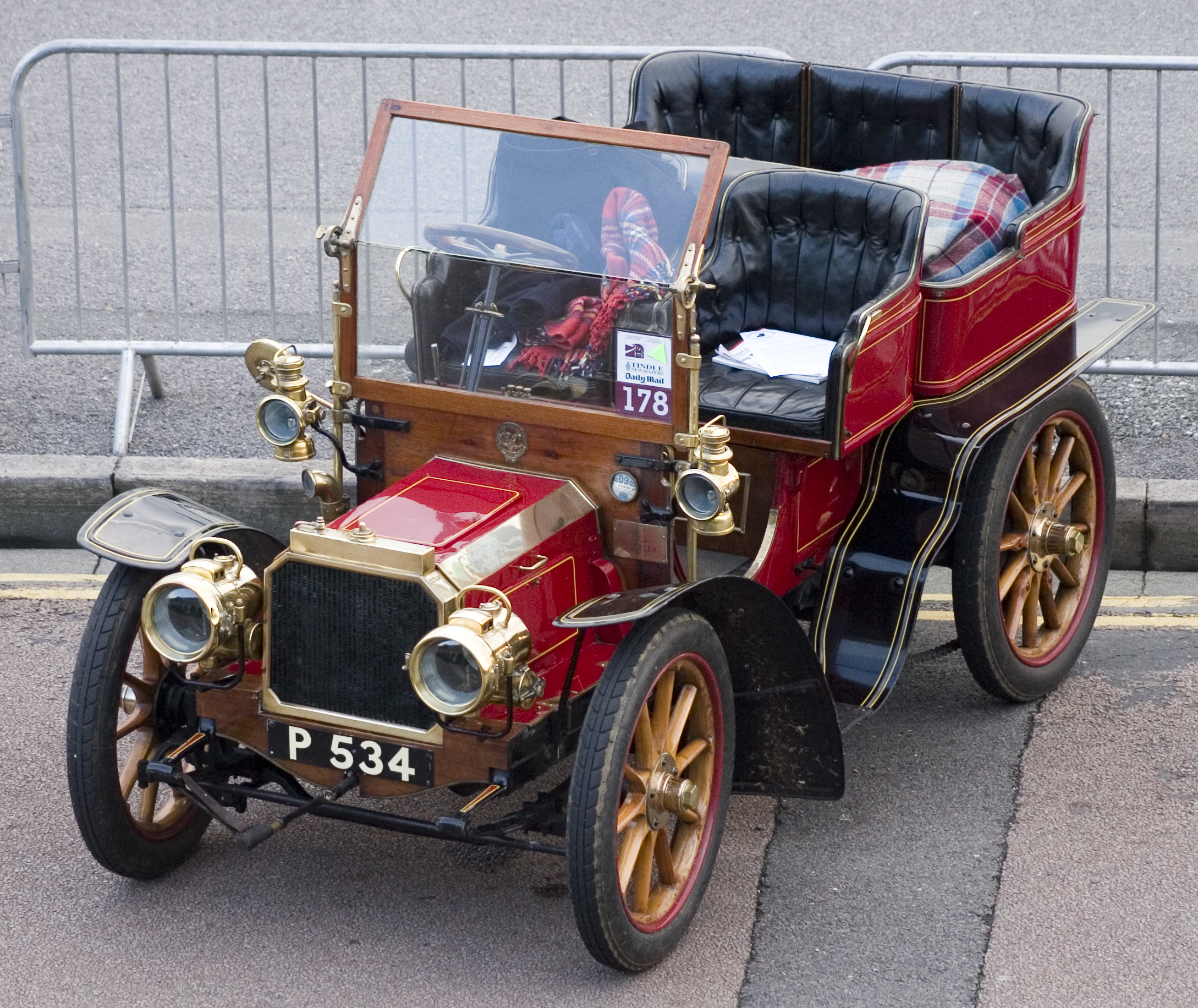
1902 Siddeley 8 hp

Siddeley founded his Siddeley Autocar Company in 1902 to manufacture cars to Peugeot designs. He had Peugeot-based demonstration cars at the Crystal Palace in 1903. By 1905, the company had a dozen models for sale and some of them were built for him at Vickers' Crayford, Kent factory.

In 1905, Wolseley—which then dominated the UK car market—purchased the goodwill and patent rights of his Siddeley Autocar Company business and appointed Siddeley as London sales manager of The Wolseley Tool and Motor Car Company Limited, owned by Vickers, Sons and Maxim, of which Herbert Austin was managing director. A few months later Herbert Austin left Wolseley to found his own Austin Motor Company and Siddeley was appointed manager of Wolseley in his place and, without authority, added Siddeley to the badge on the Wolseley cars.

He resigned from Wolseley in 1909 to go into partnership with H P P Deasy and manage the Deasy Motor Company, also of Coventry.

== Wartime expansion ==
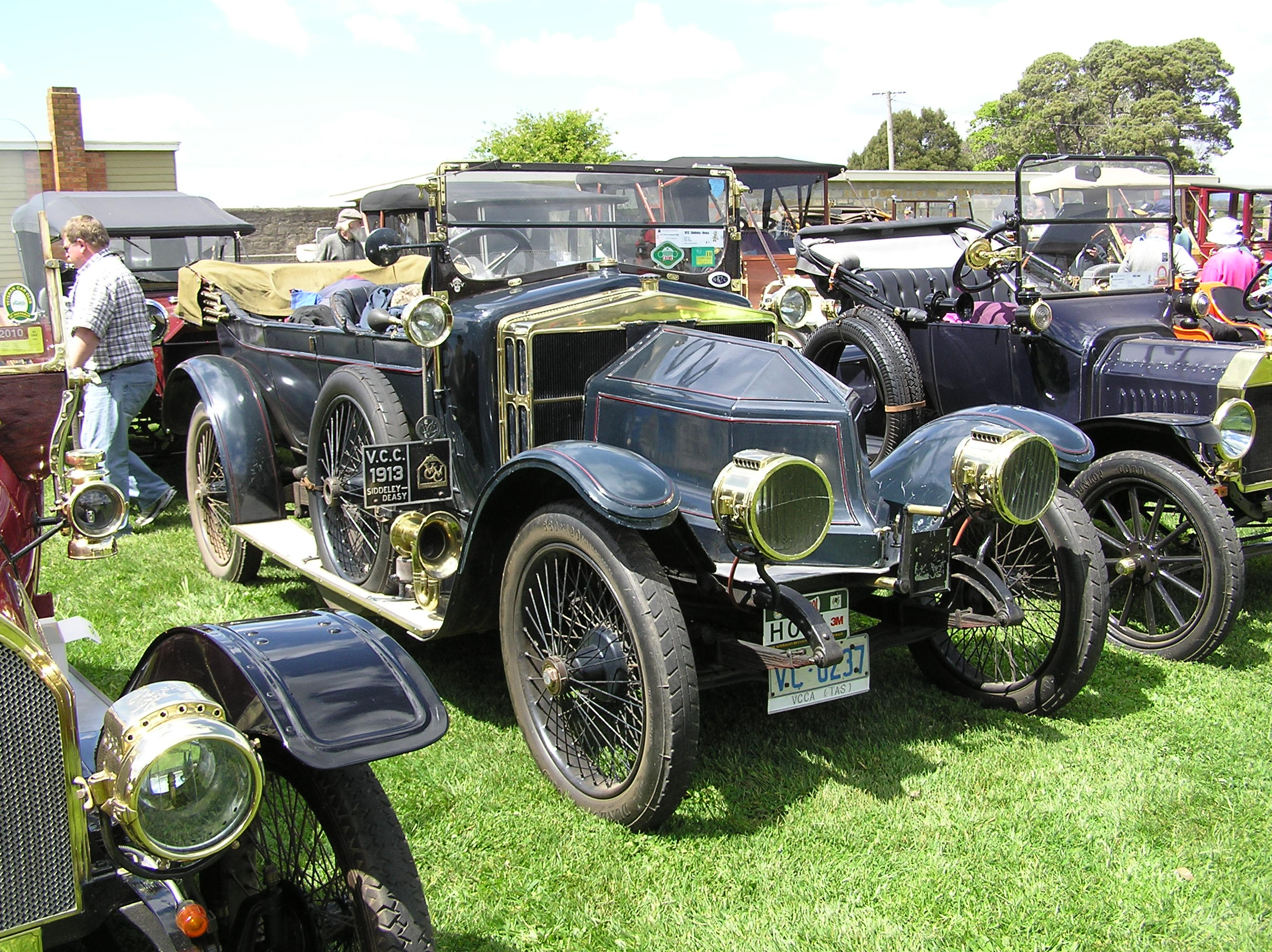
1912 Siddeley-Deasy 18-24 hp

By 1912, when Deasy resigned because of his ill-health, Siddeley had added his name to the Deasy product's radiator. In November 1912 Deasy's business became—by popular vote of the shareholders—Siddeley-Deasy. During World War I it grew rapidly producing aircraft engines and airframes with the assistance of distinguished staff from the Royal Aircraft Factory at Farnborough as well as motor vehicles including ambulances using Rover chassis and Daimler and Aster engines and employed around 5,000 workers. He was appointed a Commander of the Order of the British Empire in the 1918 New Year Honours for his industrial services during the war.

In 1918 John Siddeley and his family moved to Crackley Hall, Kenilworth. The same building later became St Joseph's School and is now Crackley Hall School.

=== Armstrong Siddeley Motors ===
Siddeley arranged a takeover of Siddeley-Deasy's motorcar, aircraft engine and aircraft business by Sir W G Armstrong Whitworth and Co Ltd and its amalgamation with the Armstrong Whitworth motor department in 1919. They renamed their new entity Armstrong Siddeley Motors. It was to continue until 1960.

Siddeley's new holding company established Sir W G Armstrong Whitworth Aircraft in July 1920.

Armstrong Siddeley Motors were enthusiastic adopters of light alloys for engines. This was a common enough approach for aircraft engines, but Armstrong-Siddeley were also early at applying them to motor cars. To provide a supply of the most sophisticated new alloys for pistons, Siddeley funded Wallace Charles Devereux to set up High Duty Alloys Ltd. in 1927, as a replacement for Peter Hooker, who had gone into liquidation.

Next Siddeley took advantage of parent companies Armstrong's and Vickers' financial difficulties of the mid-1920s and by 1927 he had gained control of all three Siddeley businesses. He remained their chairman until 1935 when, at the age of 70, he arranged his last takeover with Hawker Aircraft who formed Hawker Siddeley though the Siddeley businesses kept their identities. From this arrangement he received "£1 million and numerous benefits".

== Peerage ==
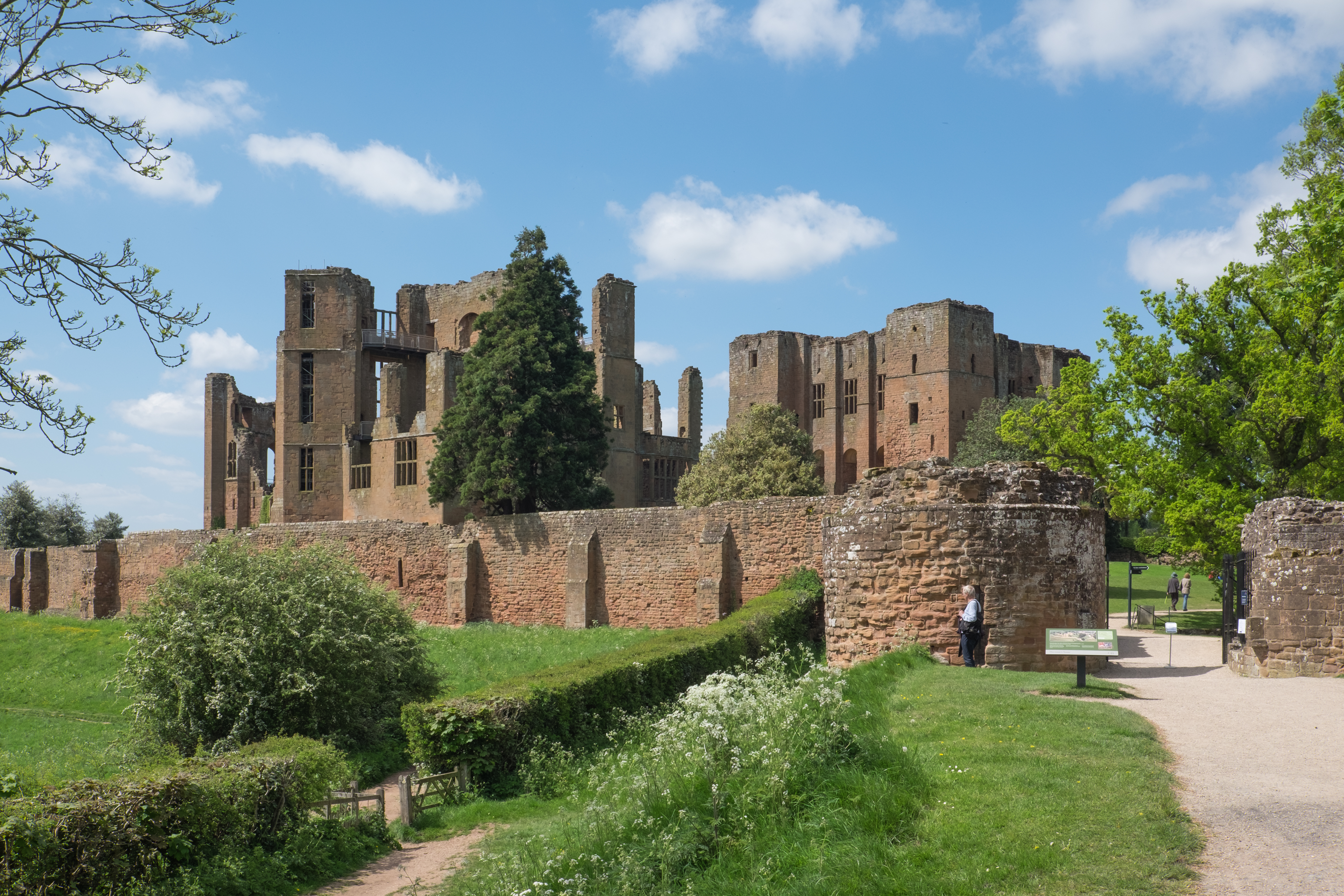
Kenilworth Castle, bought and given to the nation by Siddeley

Siddeley was knighted in 1932 when he served as High Sheriff of Warwickshire. Sir John Siddeley was elected president of the Society of Motor Manufacturers and Traders for 1937–1938 – the highest honour the British Motor Industry could bestow. That same year he was raised to the peerage as Baron Kenilworth, of Kenilworth in the County of Warwick. He was also elected president of the Society of British Aircraft Constructors for 1932–1933—now Society of British Aerospace Companies— and elected president of the Engineering and Allied Employers' National Federation for 1935–1936.

On his retirement he bought and gave to the nation the historic Kenilworth Castle. To commemorate the coronation of King George VI and Queen Elizabeth in 1937, Lord Kenilworth also made a gift of £100,000 to Fairbridge Farm Schools, a charity to offer opportunities and education abroad to young people from broken homes.

After his retirement he moved to Jersey where he died a few days after his wife in November 1953, aged 87, a voluntary tax exile and a rich man.

He was succeeded in the barony by his son Cyril.

== Arms ==
Coat of arms of John Siddeley, 1st Baron Kenilworth

Crest
Issuant out of the battlements of a tower a goat's head Argent armed Or in front of a rising sun also issuant Gold.
Escutcheon
Per chevron Or and Azure in chief two goats' heads erased and in base a triangular castle with three towers on a chief of the second two wings conjoined in fess all counterchanged.
Supporters
On either side a goat Or gorged with a collar Azure pendant therefrom by a chain Gold an escutcheon chequy of the first and second, a chief Ermine.
Motto
Nitendo (By Striving)

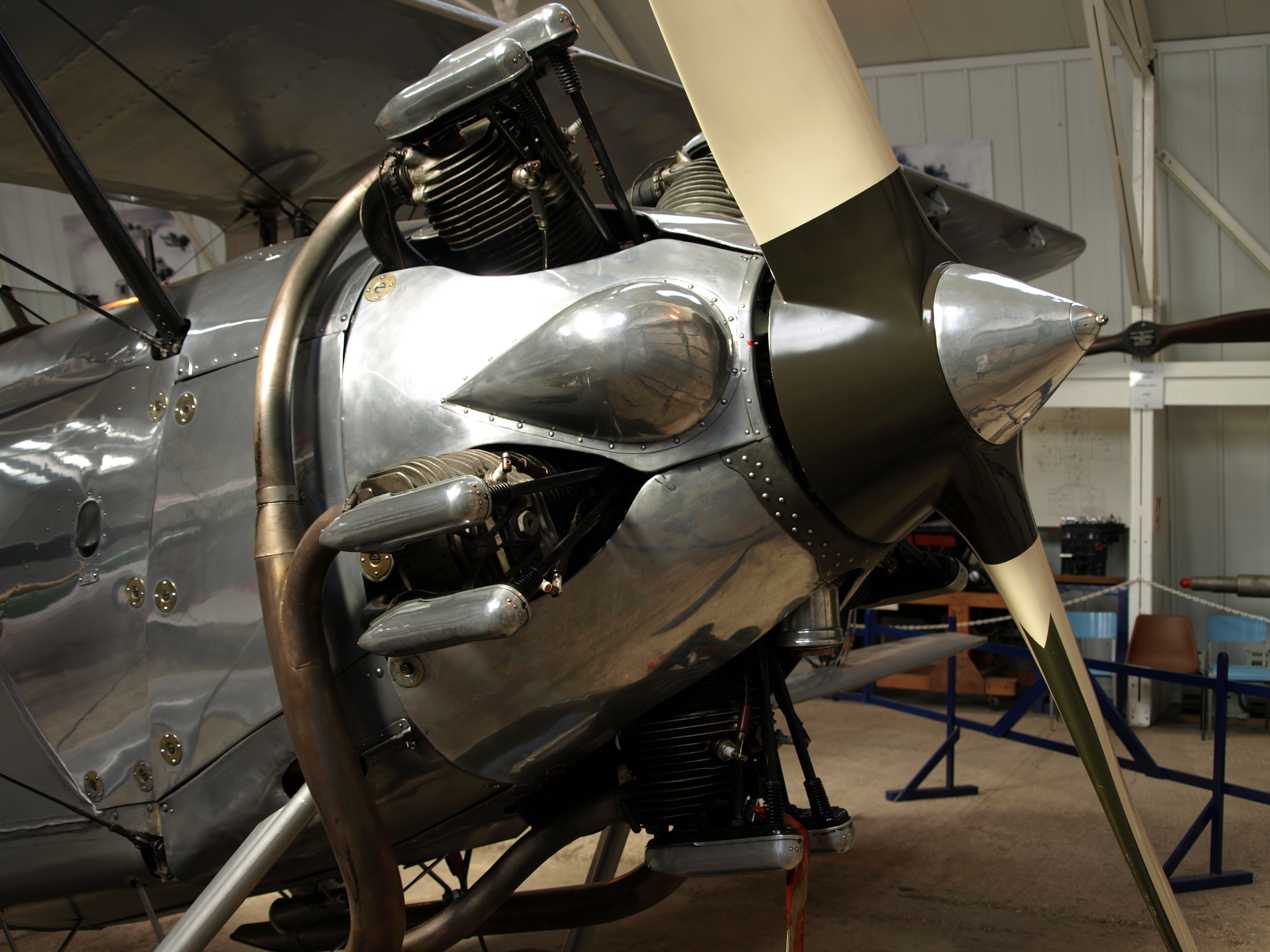
Armstrong Siddeley Mongoose
in a Hawker Tomtit

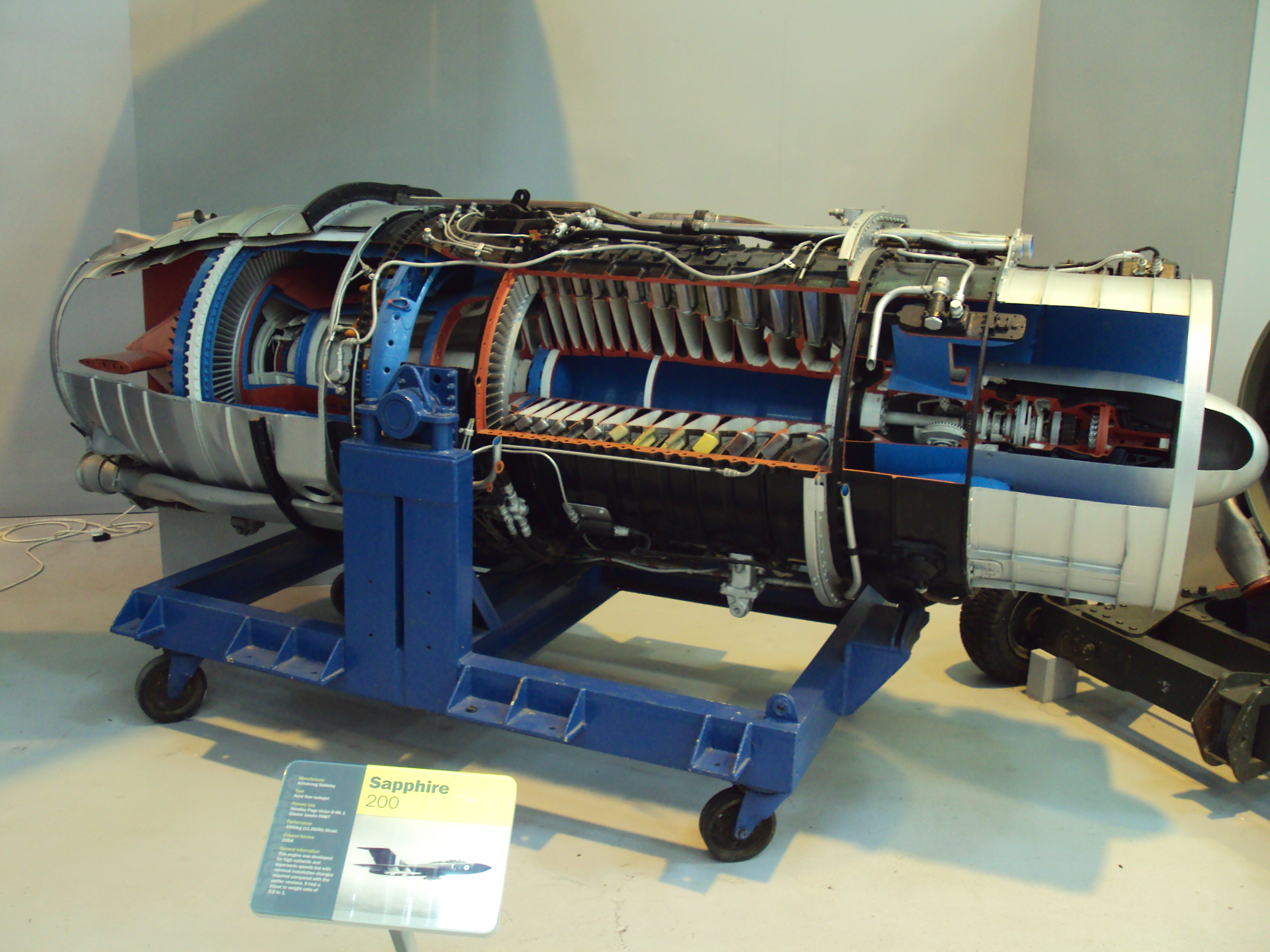
Armstrong Siddeley Sapphire 200 turbojet

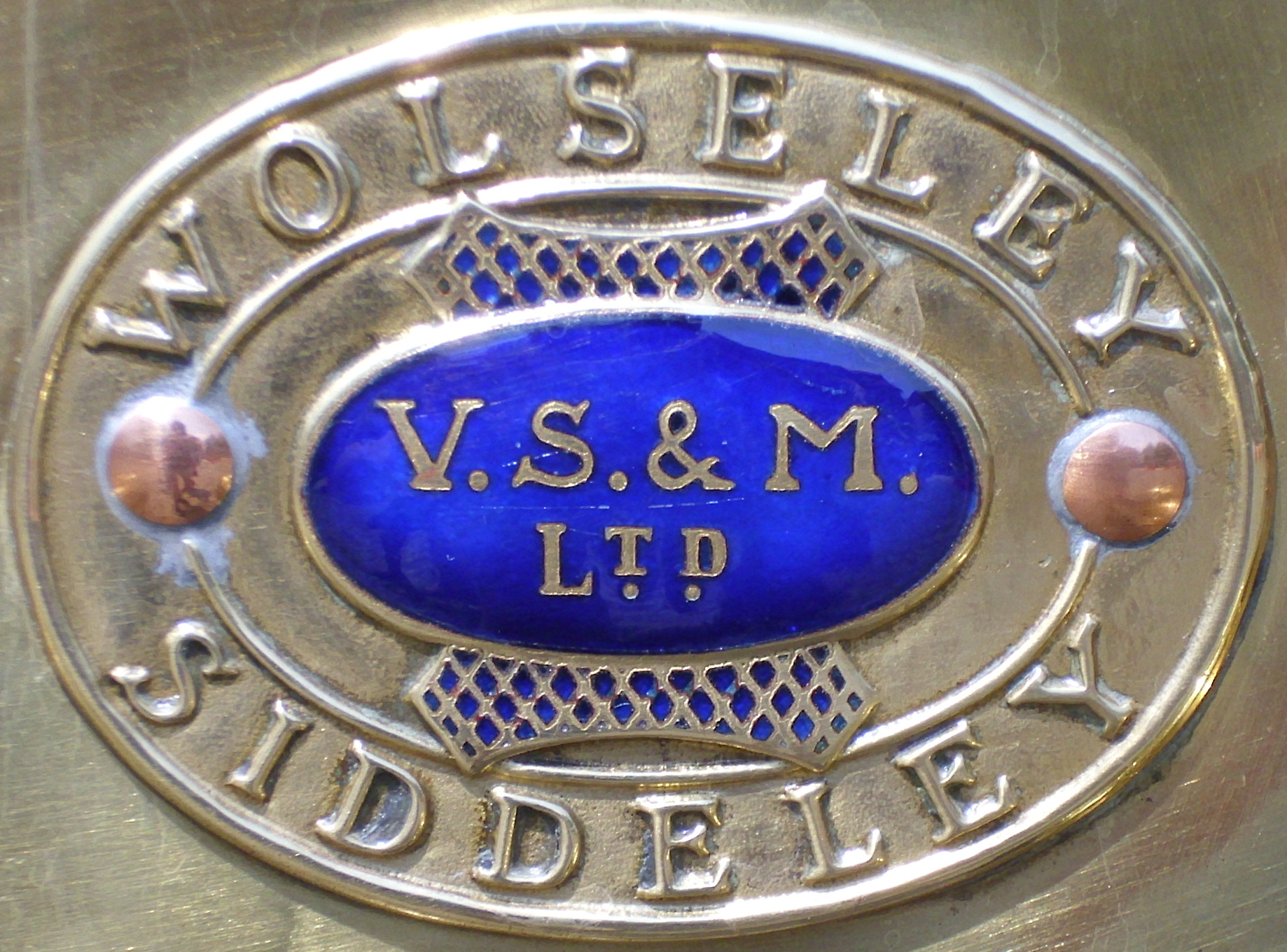
Name plate:
Vickers, Sons & Maxim
Wolseley Siddeley

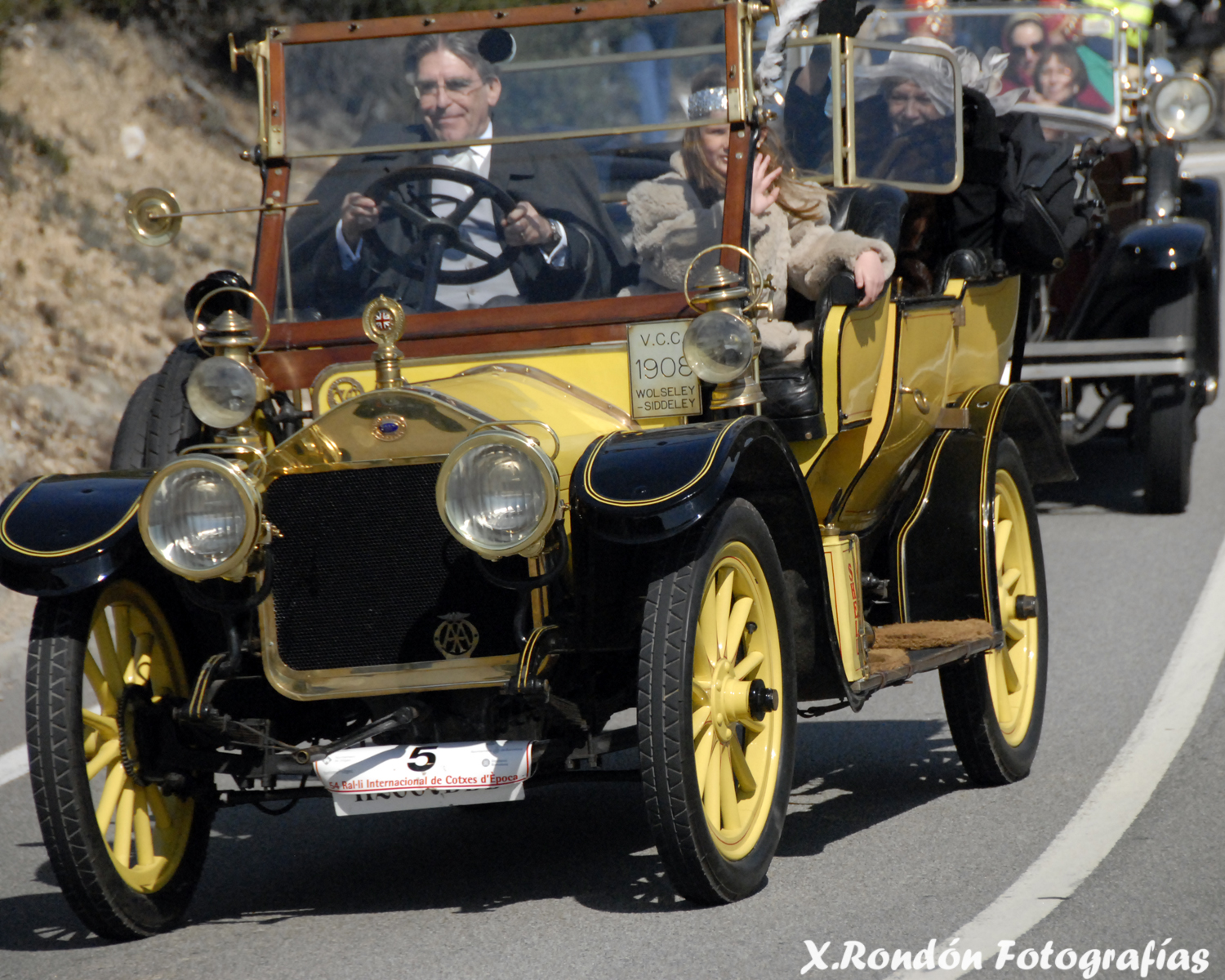
Wolseley Siddeley 1908

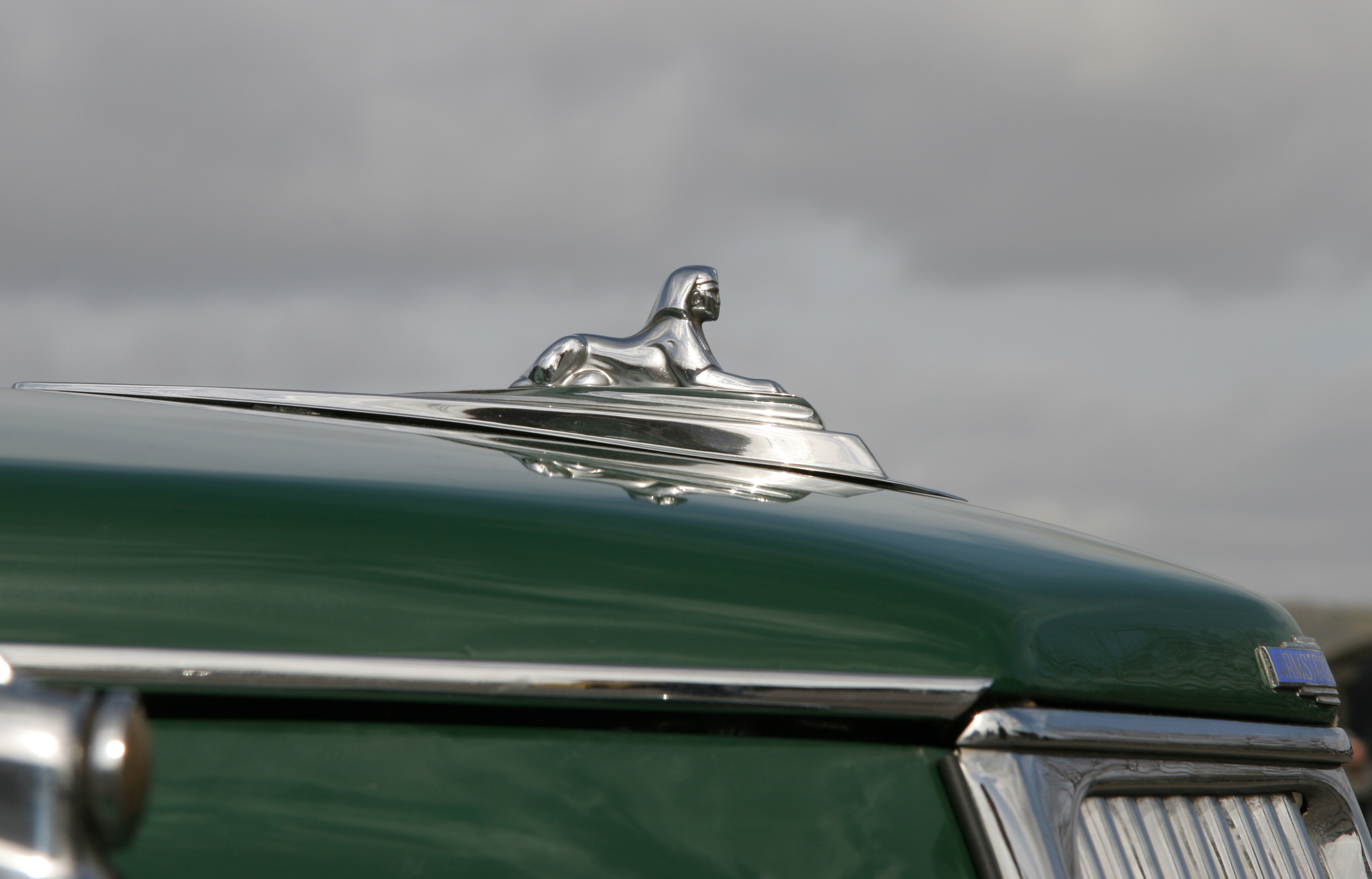
Armstrong Siddeley's Sphinx mascot

Peerage of the United Kingdom
New creation	Baron Kenilworth; 1937–1956	Succeeded by Cyril Davenport Siddeley
