= Rana Rahimpour =

British journalist (born 1983)

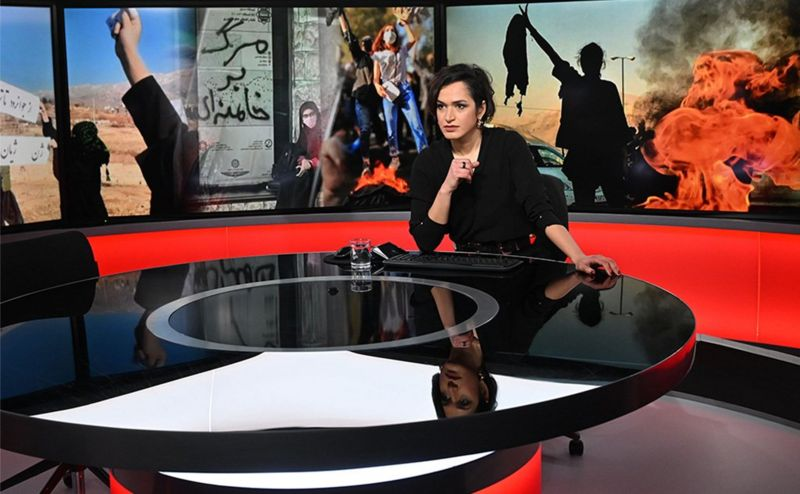
- Journalist Rana Rahimpour, 2023
- Born: 9 January 1983 (age 43)
- Occupation: Journalist
- Website: https://www.instagram.com/r.rahimpour

Rana Rahimpour (Persian: رعنا رحیم‌پور, born 9 January 1983) is an Iranian-British journalist who worked as the BBC Persian's Lead Presenter and bilingual correspondent since 2008 until 2023.Rana Rahimpour married an Englishman in 2009 and has two children named Tara and Damon.

== Life ==
Rahimpour was born on 9 January 1983 in Tehran, Iran. She was raised in Tehran. Rahimpour attended university in Iran and lived there for the first 25 years of her life. She studied English-Persian Translation at the Islamic Azad University and accounting at Al-Zahra University. She moved to London in 2008 to work for BBC Persian TV. Rahimpour left the BBC in order to ''have access to more platforms as a freelance journalist so to be a voice for the Iranians fighting for democracy.'' As one of the main anchors of BBC Persian TV, she was under constant attacks and threats by the Iranian regime. Rana Rahimpour has faced death threats and had family members detained due to her work for the BBC.

She has covered major stories including Iran's nuclear programme, Iran's Presidential elections 2009 and its aftermath both for BBC Persian television and BBC World Service and the Iranian Presidential election of 2013. As a bilingual reporter, Rahimpour covers Iranian politics on multiple BBC platforms, including the flagship news programme Newsnight. Since the beginning of 2018, Rahimpour has appeared on News At Ten. Rahimpour's Toothpaste piece for BBC Radio 4's From Our Own Correspondents was on the program's 2018 highlights. She interviewed BBC's John Simpson for the 40th anniversary of Iranian Revolution of 1979.

She is one of the outspoken advocates of free press and has been campaigning against the harassment of BBC Persian journalists and their family members in Iran. In 2018, she addressed the United Nations' Human Rights Council in Geneva, calling for an end to the intimidation of journalists by the Iranian authorities.

In 2022 Rahimpour presented the Association for International Broadcasting's awards dinner giving "AIB"s to leading people and companies involved in International Broadcasting.

== Controversies ==
In January 2016, despite being British, Rahimpour was banned from travelling to the United States because of her Iranian nationality.
