= Howard Hu =

American physician-scientist

- Education: Brown University; Albert Einstein College of Medicine; Harvard T.H. Chan School of Public Health
- Scientific career
- Workplaces: Harvard University; University of Michigan; University of Toronto; Keck School of Medicine of USC

Howard Hu is an American physician-scientist, internist, and specialist in preventive medicine and environmental health. Since 1990, he has been a Professor and academic leader at a series of Universities (Harvard University, University of Michigan, University of Toronto, University of Washington) and currently is Professor of Preventive Medicine at the Keck School of Medicine at the University of Southern California. During the same period, Dr. Hu also provided service in various leadership capacities for the International Physicians for the Prevention of War, Physicians for Human Rights, the U.S. National Institute for Environmental Health Sciences, and the Marilyn Brachmann Hoffman Foundation. He currently serves on the Board of Pure Earth, Wellness Equity Alliance, and the Research Council of the Public Health Foundation of India.

== Early life and education ==
Hu was born to Chinese immigrant parents. His mother, nee Mei-Ling (Mabel) Liang, grew up in Europe as the daughter of Lone Liang, a Chinese diplomat who served as chargé d'affaires in Berlin, Minister to Czechoslovakia, a delegate to the League of Nations, Minister to Rumania and Switzerland and Ambassador to Czechoslovakia. His father, Hung-Yung (Henry) Hu, grew up in Shanghai, received his Masters in Civil Engineering at Harvard, and worked for American Electric Power, a utility company. Henry encouraged Howard to pursue medicine although his "first love was English literature." Hu's interest in environmental and occupational health was sparked at an early age after he was exposed to asbestos while working as a torch burner at a shipyard.

Hu attended Brown University where he studied Biology and graduated with a B.Sc. in 1976. He completed his M.D. at Albert Einstein College of Medicine and his M.P.H at the Harvard School of Public Health, both in 1982. He subsequently completed an M.Sc. and Sc.D. in epidemiology at Harvard in 1986 and 1990, respectively.

== Career ==
From 1988 to 2006, Hu was affiliated with the Channing Laboratory of the Department of Medicine at Harvard Medical School/Brigham & Women's Hospital. Meanwhile, from 1990 to 2002 he rose from the rank of Assistant Professor to full Professor with tenure in the Department of Environmental Health at Harvard School of Public Health (now Harvard T.H. Chan School of Public Health). In 2006, he was recruited to the University of Michigan School of Public Health as the Chair of the Department of Environmental Health Sciences, where he also held dual appointments in Epidemiology and Medicine. From 2009 to 2012 he held the NSF International Endowed Department Chair at the university.

In 2012, he was appointed Director and Professor at the Dalla Lana School of Public Health at the University of Toronto. In 2013, the school became a stand-alone Faculty with Hu serving as the founding Dean. Hu held the position until he went on sabbatical 2017-2018. After spending two years as Affiliate Professor at the University of Washington, Hu joined the University of Southern California's Keck School of Medicine as the Flora L. Thornton Chair of the Department of Population and Public Health Sciences. In 2024, he stepped down at the Department Chair, went on a year-long sabbatical, and returned in 2025 to a portfolio mainly consisting of translational research and teaching a course on global environmental health.

In terms of research, Dr. Hu and collaborators have investigated the environmental, social, nutritional, genetic, and epigenetic determinants of adult chronic disease, impaired child development, and most recently, COVID-19, in population-based studies in the USA, Mexico, India, and China, generating over 400 peer-reviewed publications and winning awards from the U.S. National Institute for Environmental Health Sciences, the American Public Health Association, the American College of Occupational and Environmental Medicine, the International Society for Environmental Epidemiology, and other organizations along the way.

In 2026, a major part of his portfolio began to include serving as senior scientific advisor to Pure Earth, an NGO that is leading global efforts funded by Bloomberg Philanthropies, Coefficient Giving, and other donors to reduce the burden of lead poisoning in low- and middle-income countries.

== Human rights work ==
Hu serves on the Advisory Council of Physicians for Human Rights, US-based human rights NGO that uses medicine and science to document and advocate against human rights violations worldwide. He has participated in four of PHR's fact finding missions which focused on tear gas use in South Korea (1987), use of chemical weapons against Iraqi Kurds (1988),violations of medical neutrality in Burma (1990), and potentially toxic effects of mining operations on indigenous Mam people in Western Guatemala (2009).

Hu additionally served as chair of the Research Commission for International Physicians for the Prevention of Nuclear War.
