= Kwajo Tweneboa =

British social housing activist (born 1998)

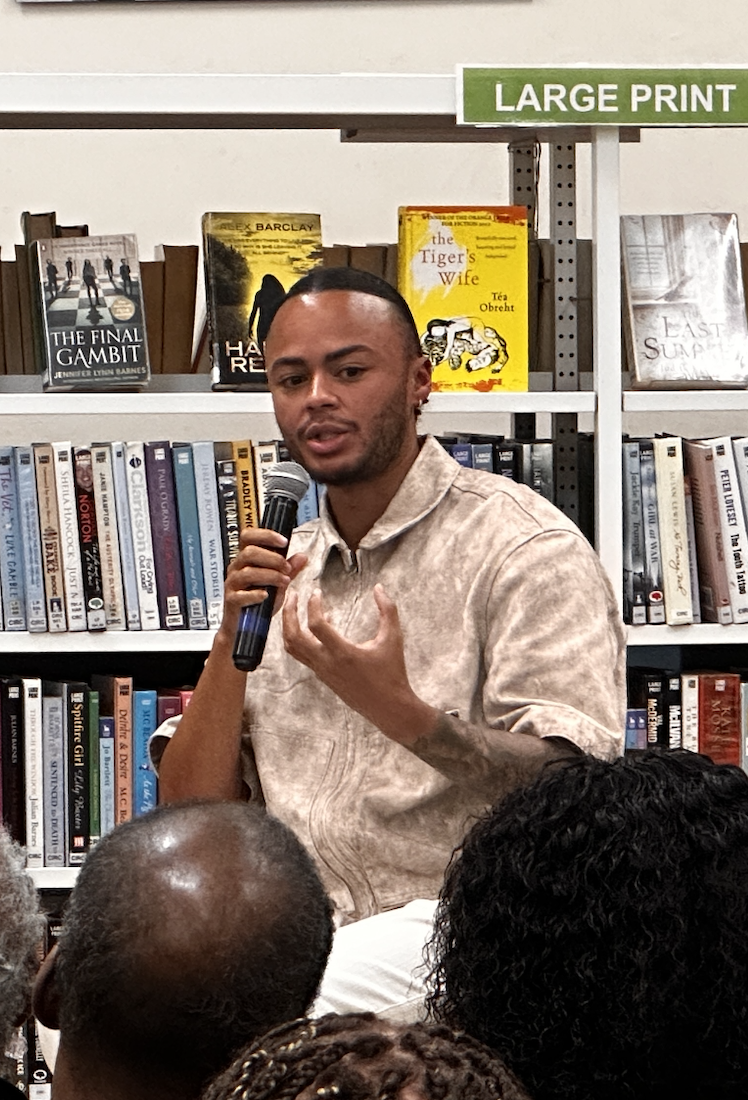
- Born: Kwajo Leon Tweneboa; October 1998 (age 27–28); London Borough of Lambeth, England
- Education: De Montfort University
- Occupations: Social housing activist and writer
- Years active: 2021–present

Kwajo Leon Tweneboa (born October 1998) is a British social housing activist and writer.

== Early life and education ==
Tweneboa was born in the South London Borough of Lambeth to a Ghanaian father and an Irish mother. He attended St Mark's Academy before going on to graduate from De Montfort University with a Bachelor of Arts (BA) degree in Business Entrepreneurship and Innovation.

== Career ==
Tweneboa did not intend to become a housing activist and was propelled to by his family's experience. They had moved into the Eastfields Estate in Mitcham in 2018 after living in temporary accommodation since 2016. The association flat was in poor condition, with several infestations, broken windows, a partially caved in ceiling, mouldy walls, water leaking through light fittings, and asbestos. Tweneboa's father Kwaku Robert Tweneboa died of oesophageal cancer in January 2020; he attributed his father's quickly declining health to the flat's unsafe living conditions. In May 2021, Tweneboa started a social media campaign with help from other Eastfields tenants to force Clarion Housing Group to do repairs after waiting 18 months.

After that, Tweneboa was contacted by social housing residents across the country and even abroad in New York for help. People would send him images and videos of their poor living conditions or invite him to come see them for himself, which he would expose on his Twitter, Instagram, and TikTok pages to raise awareness and shame housing associations into action. He appeared on The Big Issue's Changemakers 2022 list for his work.

In June 2023, Tweneboa declined an MBE as he could not "accept being honoured... off the back of an issue [that] should have never existed". He thanked the person who nominated him, and wrote to Prince William and Kate Middleton offering to collaborate with them on this issue among other issues. Tweneboa considers solving the housing crisis non-partisan and has met with multiple figures across the political spectrum to discuss the issue, including Sadiq Khan, Michael Gove, Keir Starmer and Angela Rayner. Tweneboa appeared on Politico's Power 40: London Class of 2023 list. He attended the November 2023 Next Gen Summit in Hackney.

Tweneboa published his debut book titled Our Country in Crisis, described as a "rallying manifesto" on the housing crisis, in July 2024, via Trapeze Books (an Orion Publishing Group imprint), which acquired the publishing rights in a seven-way auction. The Big Issue named Tweneboa "Britain's most high-profile housing campaigner". Also that year, Sky News worked with Tweneboa to identify vacant Council properties.

== Bibliography ==
- Our Country in Crisis: Britain's Housing Emergency and How We Rebuild (2024)
