= Vicky Spratt =

Journalist and documentary maker

Victoria Anne Spratt (born April 1988) is a British journalist and author. Her 2016 campaign Make Renting Fair highlighted the plight of 'generation rent' and succeeded in getting letting fees for tenants in England banned. She speaks at political conferences about the need for security in renting. Spratt has also done work on the mental health side effects of hormonal contraception, with her Debrief investigation Mad About The Pill covered on BBC Radio 4 and BBC News. She has appeared as a commentator on BBC Woman's Hour, Daily Politics, Radio 2, BBC 5 live, and NTS radio, and has spoken at political party conferences about the housing crisis. In 2021, she was included on the shortlist for Press Gazette's British Journalism Awards.

== Early life ==
Spratt grew up in Surrey and attended Oxted County School. She went on to graduate from Pembroke College, Oxford. Spratt later wrote an article for iNews about going into debt after graduating.

== Career ==
Between 2013 and 2015 Spratt worked as a freelance journalist, writing opinion, features and news and reporting for publications including The Telegraph, BBC Magazine, The Debrief and Broadly. Articles were mostly about politics and women's lifestyle. In January 2017, she began a role as Deputy editor at The Debrief.

Spratt's radio documentary Generation Right, which she wrote and co-presented, was broadcast on BBC Radio 4 on 16 June 2014. The documentary investigates changing political views across generations.

Spratt made a short documentary about abortion rights in Northern Ireland for The Debrief, addressing the effect of Theresa May's coalition with the DUP.

Spratt's first book, Tenants, was published by Profile Books in 2022. James Riding reviewed the book positively for The Times, describing it as "excoriating". The book was also chosen for The Guardian's "Book of the Day". Spratt began research for the book in 2017.

== Activism ==
=== Housing rights campaigner ===
In 2016 Spratt ran a campaign, Make Renting Fair, in her role at The Debrief to highlight the plight of ‘Generation Rent’ which resulted in the Government announcing a ban on letting agency fees for tenants.

=== Mental health and hormonal contraception ===
She has also worked to highlight the mental health side effects of hormonal contraception, and her Debrief investigation Mad About The Pill was covered on Radio 4 and BBC news. She wrote and co-presented a documentary about the politics of young people for Radio 4, Generation Right, and has written for VICE, Broadly, BBC, The Independent, The Evening Standard and The Spectator.
