= Gary Smith (trade unionist) =

Scottish trade union leader

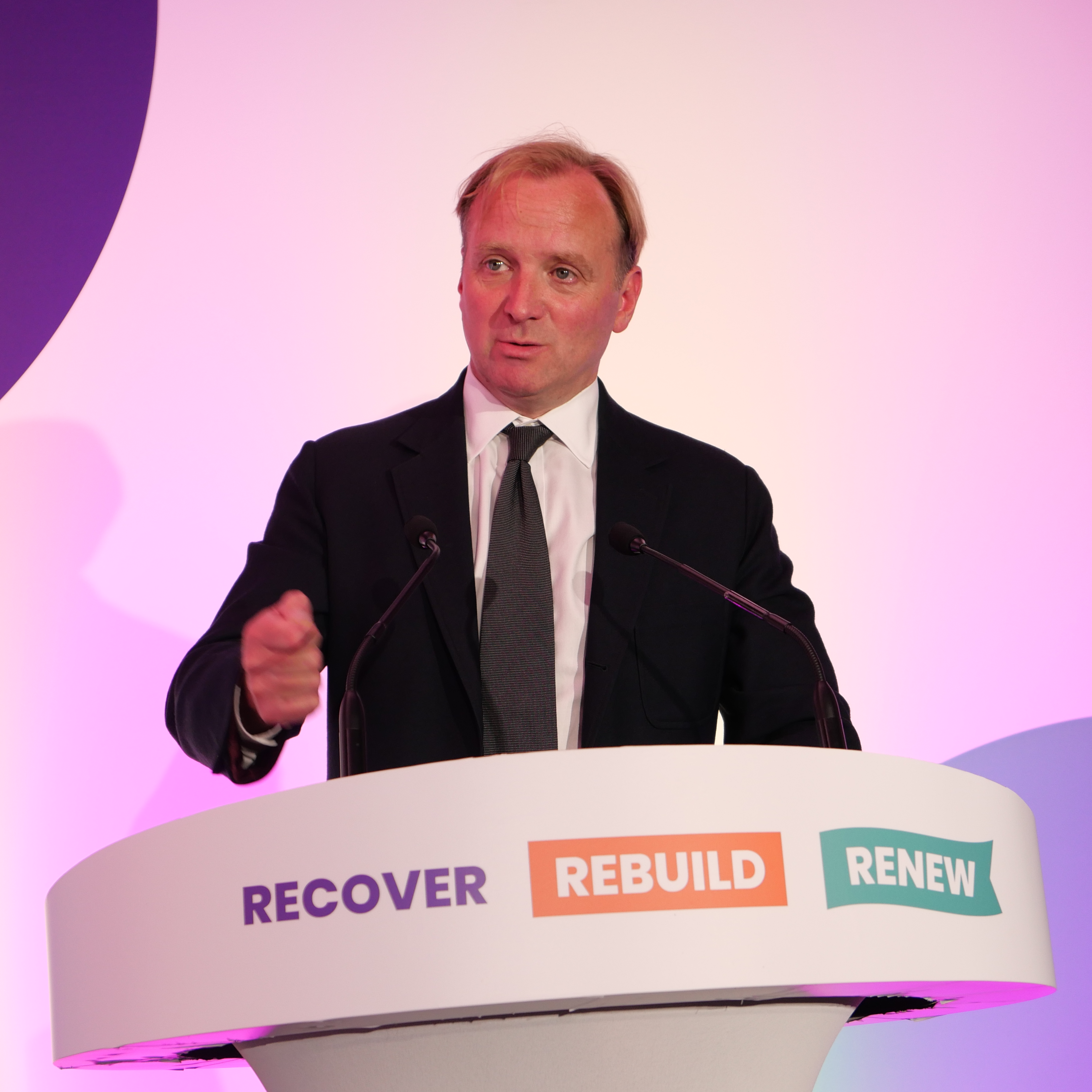
- Gary Smith addresses GMB Congress in June 2021, following his election as General Secretary.

General Secretary of GMB
- Incumbent
- Assumed office June 2021

Gary Smith is a Scottish trade union leader.

Born in Edinburgh, Smith completed an apprenticeship as a gas fitter, joining the GMB at the age of 16. He became a shop steward and when he was 26 the union paid for him to study at Ruskin College, which he followed with a master's degree in industrial relations from Warwick University.

After completing his education, Smith returned to working in the gas industry, and to trade union activism. He began working full-time for the union, as Recruitment Officer, then as a Senior Organiser, National Officer, and then as National Secretary for Commercial Services. In 2015, he became the union's Scotland Secretary. In this role, he was frequently critical of the Scottish National Party government. A supporter of Keir Starmer's leadership of the Labour Party, he opposed Richard Leonard's efforts to remain leader of Scottish Labour, despite Leonard being a member of the GMB.

In 2021, Smith was elected as General Secretary of the union after securing more than 50% of the vote, defeating Rehana Azam and Giovanna Holt. As General Secretary, he pledged to implement the recommendations of a report by Karon Monaghan QC, which argued that the union had problems with "bullying, misogyny, cronyism and sexual harassment".

Smith urged the Labour Party to back fracking in September 2022, telling them not to bow to the "bourgeois environmental lobby". In August 2023, Smith criticised the expansion of the London Ultra-Low Emissions Zone and called for the Labour Party to rethink its plans to ban new oil and gas exploration in the North Sea.

In June 2024 the New Statesman named Smith 46th in The Left Power List 2024, the magazine's "guide to the 50 most influential people in progressive politics".

Gary Smith was re-elected unopposed for a second term as GMB General Secretary in April 2026.

Trade union offices
| Preceded by Tim Roache | General Secretary of the GMB; 2021–present | Succeeded by Incumbent |
