= Newton-Smith =

Newton-Smith is a double-barrelled English surname. Notable people with the surname include:

- Apple Newton-Smith (fl. 1999), Canadian judge
- Rain Newton-Smith (born 1975), British association executive
- William Newton-Smith (1943–2023), Canadian philosopher of science
