= William Newton-Smith =

Canadian philosopher of science (1943–2023)

- Born: William Herbert Newton-Smith; 25 May 1943; Orillia, Ontario, Canada
- Died: 8 April 2023 (aged 79); Mynydd Epynt, Wales

Education
- Education: Queen's University at Kingston (BA); Cornell University (MA); Balliol College, Oxford (DPhil)

Philosophical work
- Era: Contemporary philosophy
- Region: Western philosophy
- School: Analytic philosophy
- Institutions: Balliol College, Oxford; Central European University
- Doctoral students: Timothy Williamson
- Main interests: Philosophy of science Philosophy of time Logic
- Notable ideas: The structure of time

William Herbert Newton-Smith (May 25, 1943 – April 8, 2023) was a Canadian philosopher of science.

== Biography ==
Newton-Smith's undergraduate degree from Queen's University was in Mathematics and Philosophy, in 1966. He took an MA from Cornell University in Philosophy, in 1968, and a DPhil in philosophy from Balliol College, Oxford, in 1974. His working life before retirement was mainly as a fellow of Balliol.

Newton-Smith's 1980 book The Structure of Time focuses on the philosophy of time. In the 1980s he led a small team of British philosophers, including Kathy Wilkes and Roger Scruton, who travelled to Czechoslovakia to give unauthorized philosophy lectures.

Newton-Smith led Central European University from its foundation in 1991 until Alfred Stepan was elected rector in 1993.

Newton-Smith had two daughters with his first wife Dorris Heffron. His daughter Rain Newton-Smith is an economist who became the Director General of the Confederation of British Industry (CBI) in April 2023. His daughter Madame Justice Apple Newton-Smith is a judge for the Ontario Superior Court of Justice.

In 2003, Newton-Smith and his second wife Nancy Durham were the first to grow lavender on a field scale in Wales. They became the sole distillers of lavender oil in Wales. Their company, Welsh Lavender Ltd, produces face and body creams.

Newton-Smith died of throat cancer on April 8, 2023, at the age of 79.

== Works ==
- The Structure of Time (1980)
- The Rationality of Science (1981)
- Logic (1984)
- Modelling the Mind (1990), editor with K. V. Wilkes
- Popper in China (1992), editor with J. Tianji
- Chapter 1 — "Popper, ciência e racionalidade". In Karl Popper: Filosofia e problemas (1997), organized by Anthony O'Hear, translated to Portuguese by Luiz Paulo Rouanet. Editora Unesp. Cambridge University Press.
- The Companion to the Philosophy of Science (2000)
