= Catherine Ashton =

British politician (born 1956)

The Right Honourable The Baroness Ashton of Upholland LG GCMG PC
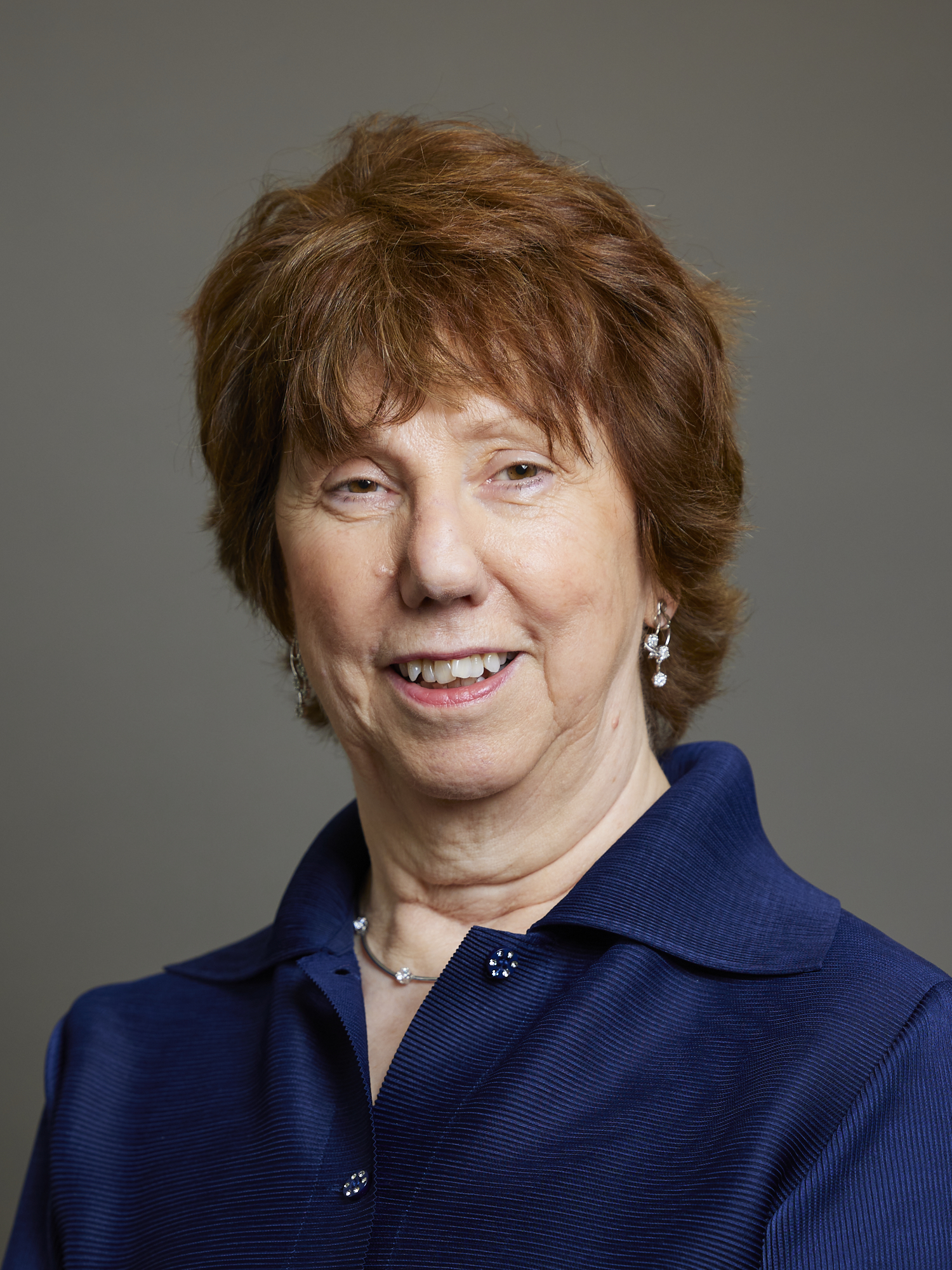
- Official portrait, 2024

Chancellor of the University of Warwick
- Incumbent
- Assumed office 1 January 2017
- Vice-Chancellor: Stuart Croft
- Preceded by: Sir Richard Lambert

First Vice-President of the European Commission
- In office 10 February 2010 – 31 October 2014
- President: José Manuel Barroso
- Preceded by: Margot Wallström
- Succeeded by: Frans Timmermans

High Representative of the Union for Foreign Affairs and Security Policy
- In office 1 December 2009 – 31 October 2014
- Preceded by: Javier Solana (Common Foreign and Security Policy)
- Succeeded by: Federica Mogherini

European Commissioner for Trade
- In office 3 October 2008 – 1 December 2009
- President: José Manuel Barroso
- Preceded by: Peter Mandelson
- Succeeded by: Benita Ferrero-Waldner

Leader of the House of Lords Lord President of the Council
- In office 28 June 2007 – 3 October 2008
- Prime Minister: Gordon Brown
- Preceded by: The Baroness Amos
- Succeeded by: The Baroness Royall of Blaisdon

Parliamentary Under-Secretary of State for Justice (Note: Constitutional Affairs until 8 May 2007)
- In office 9 September 2004 – 27 June 2007
- Prime Minister: Tony Blair
- Preceded by: The Lord Filkin
- Succeeded by: The Lord Hunt of Kings Heath

Parliamentary Under-Secretary of State for Sure Start, Early Years, Childcare and School Standards
- In office 12 June 2001 – 9 September 2004
- Prime Minister: Tony Blair
- Preceded by: Jacqui Smith
- Succeeded by: The Lord Filkin

Member of the House of Lords
- Lord Temporal
- Life peerage 2 August 1999

Personal details
- Born: Catherine Margaret Ashton; 20 March 1956 (age 70) Upholland, West Lancashire, England
- Party: Non-affiliated (2008–2023); Labour (until 2008, from 2023
- Spouse: Peter Kellner (m. 1988)
- Education: Bedford College, London (BSc)

Catherine Margaret Ashton, Baroness Ashton of Upholland (born 20 March 1956) is a British Labour politician who served as the High Representative of the Union for Foreign Affairs and Security Policy and First Vice President of the European Commission in the Barroso Commission from 2009 to 2014.

Her political career began in 1999 when she was created a life peer as Baroness Ashton of Upholland, of St Albans in the County of Hertfordshire, by Tony Blair's Labour government. She became the Parliamentary Under-Secretary of State in the Department for Education and Skills in 2001 and subsequently in the Ministry of Justice in 2004. She was appointed a Privy Counsellor in May 2006 and Lady Companion of the Most Noble Order of the Garter in April 2023.

Ashton became Leader of the House of Lords and Lord President of the Council in Gordon Brown's first Cabinet in June 2007. She was instrumental in steering the EU's Treaty of Lisbon through the UK Parliament's upper chamber. In 2008, she was appointed as the British European Commissioner and became the Commissioner for Trade in the European Commission.

In December 2009, she became the inaugural High Representative of the Union for Foreign Affairs and Security Policy that was created by the Treaty of Lisbon. As High Representative, Ashton served as the EU's foreign policy chief. Despite being criticised by some, particularly at the time of her appointment and in the early stages of her term of office, for her limited previous experience of international diplomacy, Ashton subsequently won praise for her work as a negotiator in difficult international situations, in particular for her role in bringing Serbia and Kosovo to an agreement in April 2013 that normalised their ties, and in the P5+1 talks with Iran which led to the November 2013 Geneva interim agreement on the Iranian nuclear programme.

In January 2017, Ashton became Chancellor of the University of Warwick, succeeding Sir Richard Lambert and becoming Warwick's first female chancellor.

== Early life ==
Catherine Ashton was born at Upholland, Lancashire, on 20 March 1956. She comes from a working-class family, with a background in coal mining.

Ashton attended Upholland Grammar School in Billinge Higher End, Lancashire, then Wigan Mining and Technical College, Wigan. She graduated with a Bachelor of Science degree in Sociology in 1977 from Bedford College, London (now part of Royal Holloway, University of London). Ashton was the first person in her family to attend university.

== Career ==
=== United Kingdom ===
Between 1977 and 1983, Ashton worked for the Campaign for Nuclear Disarmament (CND) as an administrator and in 1982 was elected as its national treasurer and subsequently as one of its vice-chairs. From 1979 to 1981 she was business manager of the Coverdale Organisation, a management consultancy.

As of 1983 she worked for the Central Council for Education and Training in Social Work. From 1983 to 1989 she was director of Business in the Community, working with business to tackle inequality, and she established the Employers' Forum on Disability, Opportunity Now, and the Windsor Fellowship. For most of the 1990s, she was a freelance policy adviser. She chaired the Health Authority in Hertfordshire from 1998 to 2001 and she became a vice-president of the National Council for One-Parent Families.

She was created a Labour Life Peer as Baroness Ashton of Upholland in 1999, under Prime Minister Tony Blair. In June 2001 she was appointed Parliamentary Under-Secretary of State in the Department for Education and Skills. In 2002 she became Minister responsible for Sure Start in the same department, and in September 2004 she was appointed Parliamentary Under-Secretary in the Department for Constitutional Affairs, with responsibilities including the National Archives and the Public Guardianship Office. Ashton was sworn of the Privy Council in 2006, and she became Parliamentary Under-Secretary of State at the new Ministry of Justice in May 2007.

In 2005 she was voted "Minister of the Year" by The House magazine and "Peer of the Year" by Channel 4. In 2006 she won the "Politician of the Year" award at the annual Stonewall Awards, made to those who had a positive impact on the lives of British LGBT people.

On 28 June 2007, Prime Minister Gordon Brown appointed Ashton to HM Cabinet as Leader of the House of Lords and Lord President of the Council. As Government Leader in the House of Lords, she was responsible for steering the Lisbon Treaty through the Upper House.

=== European Union ===
On 3 October 2008, Ashton was nominated by the UK to replace Peter Mandelson as the European Commissioner for Trade. Because European Commissioners may not engage in any other occupation during their term of office, whether gainful or not, she used the procedural device previously adopted in 1984 by Lord Cockfield and took a leave of absence from the House of Lords on 14 October 2008, retaining her peerage but not her seat. After a confirmation hearing by the Trade Committee of the European Parliament, Ashton was approved by the Parliament on 22 October 2008 by 538 to 40 votes, with 63 abstentions.

During her term, Ashton represented the EU in negotiations related to a long-running dispute over beef with the United States (May 2009), led the EU delegation in an agreement with South Korea that removed virtually all tariffs between the two economies (October 2009) and represented the EU in ending a long-running dispute over banana imports, principally involving Latin America and the EU.

==== Foreign Affairs and Security Policy ====
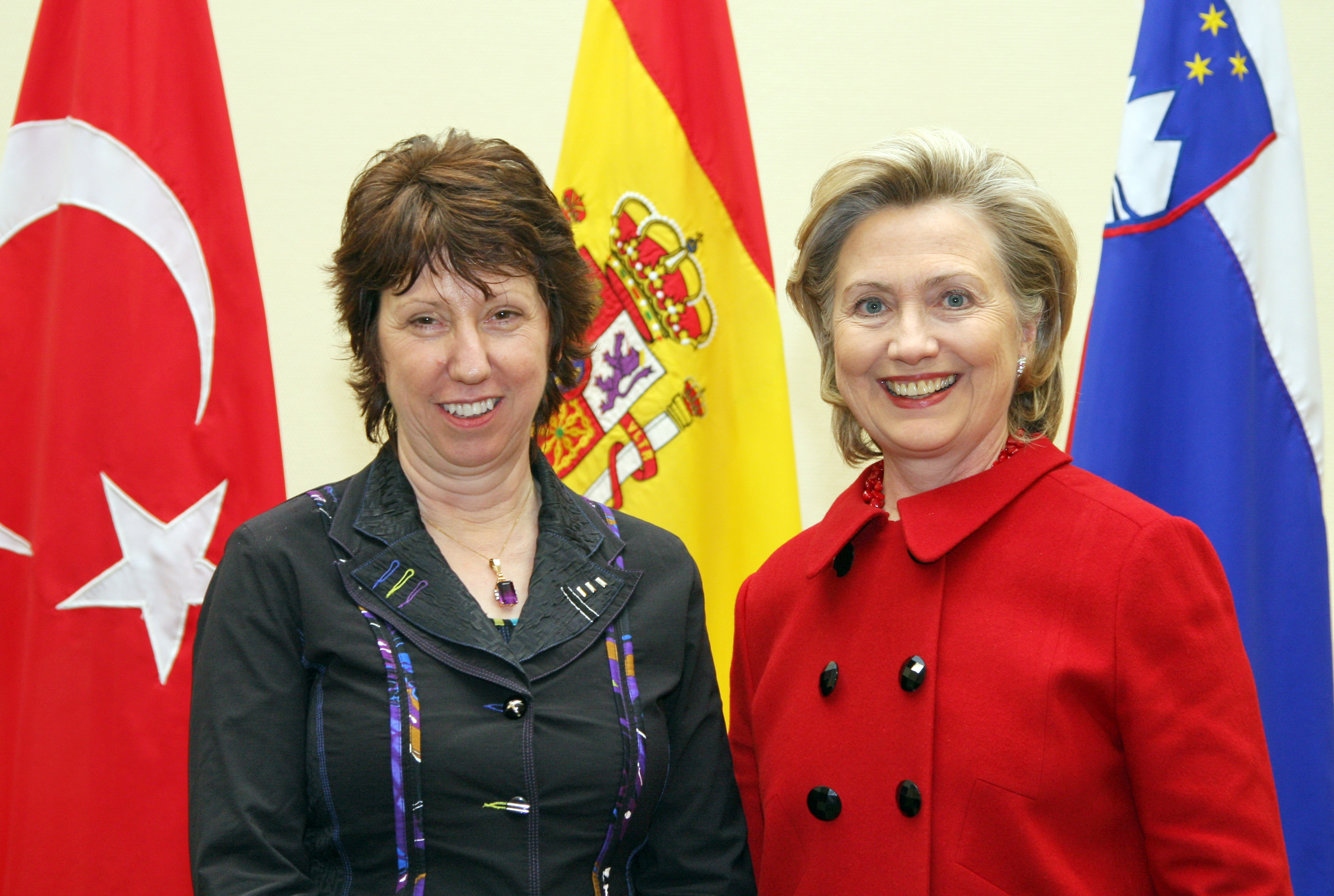
Ashton with U.S. Secretary of State Hillary Clinton

On 19 November 2009, Ashton was appointed the EU's first High Representative of the Union for Foreign Affairs and Security policy. Her appointment was agreed at a summit by 27 European Union leaders in Brussels. Having initially pushed for former British Prime Minister Tony Blair to become President of the European Council, Gordon Brown eventually relented on the condition that the post of High Representative be awarded to a Briton. She took office on 1 December 2009 for a five-year-term.

Ashton's relative obscurity prior to her appointment prompted comment in the media. The Guardian newspaper reported that her appointment as High Representative had received a "cautious welcome... from international relations experts". The Economist described her as being a virtual unknown with paltry political experience, having no foreign-policy background and never having been elected to anything. The magazine credited her, however, with piloting the Lisbon Treaty through the House of Lords, handling the European Commission's Trade Portfolio without disagreement with her colleagues, and being suited to consensus-building.

Critics predicted she would be out of her depth. Nile Gardiner of The Heritage Foundation, who opposed a European Union role in foreign and security policy on principle, wrote in The Daily Telegraph "This may well be the most ridiculous appointment in EU history". Daniel Hannan, a British Conservative MEP, complained that she had "no background in trade issues at a time when the EU is engaged in critical negotiations with Canada, Korea and the WTO". The Guardian quoted an anonymous Whitehall source as commenting "Cathy just got lucky...The appointment of her and Herman Van Rompuy European Council president was a complete disgrace. They are no more than garden gnomes."

By contrast, former Home Secretary Charles Clarke said: "I have seen Cathy in action. I have great respect for her. She is excellent at building good relations with people and a good negotiator". Shami Chakrabarti, the director of Liberty, a human-rights pressure group, said: "people underestimate Cathy at their peril. She is not a great big bruiser. She is a persuader and a charmer. That is the secret of her success."

She was appointed Dame Grand Cross of the Order of St Michael and St George (GCMG) in the 2015 New Year Honours List for services to the European Common Foreign and Security Policy.

==== Notable events of her term as High Representative ====
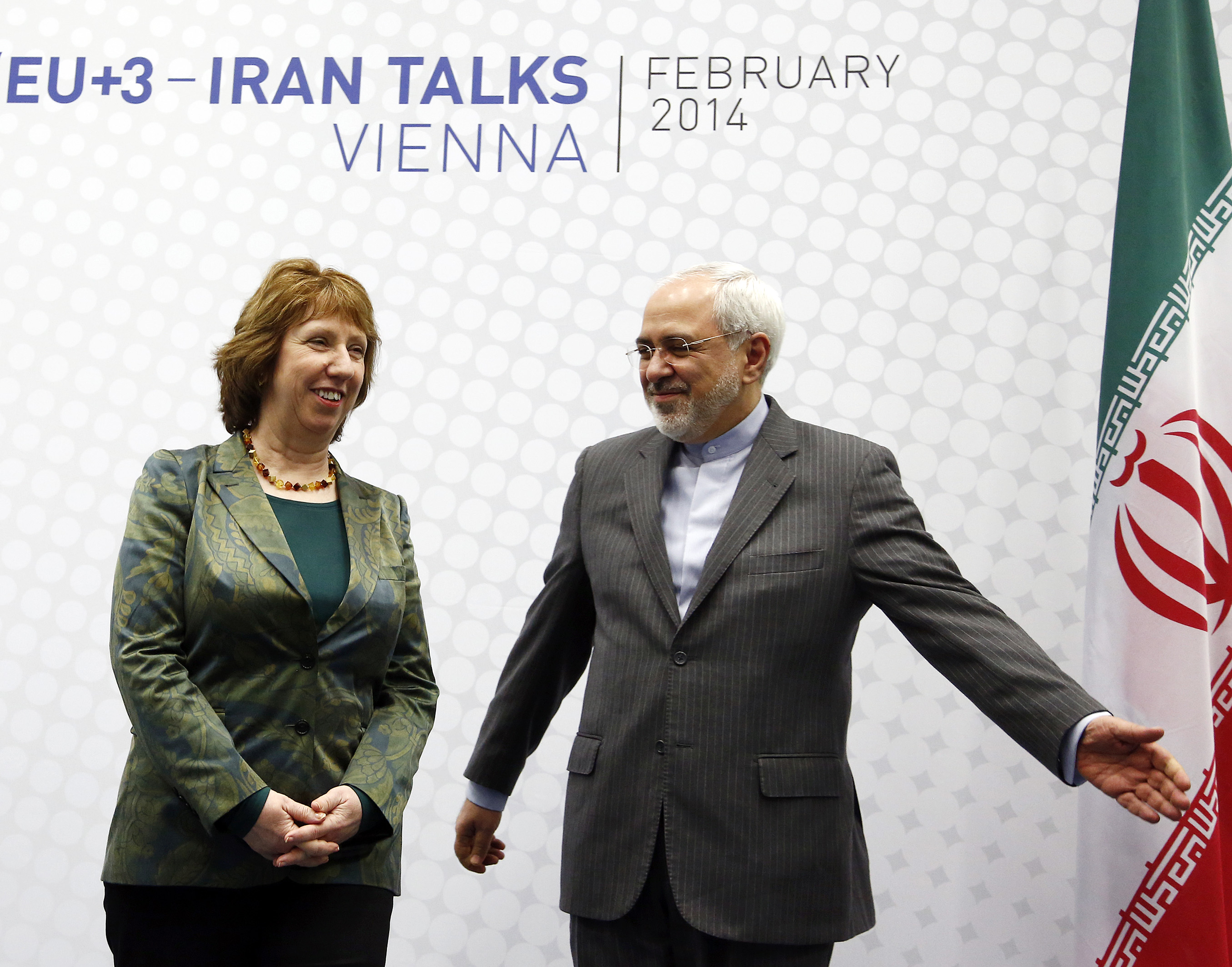
Ashton and Iranian foreign minister Javad Zarif, the first round of Comprehensive agreement on Iranian nuclear programme, February 2014

Notable events of her term included:

- Establishing the European External Action Service (1 December 2010), which merged the external relations departments of the European Commission and the Council of the European Union, and was to have diplomats seconded from national foreign services. Throughout the first half of 2010 Ashton sought agreement between the Council, the Parliament and the Commission over the shape of the EEAS. Parliament agreed to the plan on 8 July, when MEPs approved the service by 549 votes for and 78 against with 17 abstentions. The Council approved the transfer of departments to the EAS on 20 July. Until the EEAS became operational, Ashton had been supported by a staff of about 30 people.
- Working with EU Special Representative Alexander Rondos to head Operation Atalanta: an EU military action off the coast of Somalia, which curtailed piracy (May 2012).
- Helping to reach a deal between Serbia and Kosovo that normalised their ties (April 2013).
- Successfully negotiating with the Egyptian Army a visit to the deposed president, Mohamed Morsi, in their custody. She reported that he was in good health and was well treated and aware of current affairs. (July 2013.)
- Chairmanship of the P5+1 in their negotiations with Iran on nuclear matters in 2013, which led to the Geneva interim agreement on the Iranian nuclear programme (November 2013).
- Her visit to Kyiv during Ukraine's Euromaidan protests.

==== Serbia-Kosovo ====
In April 2013, after two years of negotiations, the governments of Serbia and Kosovo reached agreement to normalise their relations. Although Serbia did not formally recognise Kosovo as an independent state, it did "in effect – concede that the government in Pristina has legal authority over the whole territory, including Serb-majority areas of northern Kosovo". In return, Kosovo agreed to grant a degree of autonomy to four Serb-majority areas. The agreement, which among other things removed obstacles to Serbia and Kosovo joining the European Union, followed Ashton's mediation of ten rounds of talks between Serbia's Prime Minister, Ivica Dacic, and Kosovo Prime Minister Hashim Thaci. A cross-party committee of the U.S. House of Representatives nominated Ashton and her fellow negotiators Dacic and Thaci for the Nobel Peace Prize. A similar nomination came from the Group of the Progressive Alliance of Socialists and Democrats in the European Parliament

==== Iran ====
After the November 2013 negotiation of an interim agreement with Iran over its nuclear programme, the Financial Times wrote that Ashton was "no longer the diplomatic dilettante". A senior French diplomat was quoted as saying, "I tip my hat to her.... She truly played a decisive role". The report continued that, after initially insisting on negotiating only with other foreign ministers, by the latter stages of the negotiations the Iranian foreign minister Mohammad Javad Zarif "now... wanted to deal only with Lady Ashton". Said a western diplomat, "That the others agreed to this was significant. For China and Russia to be outside while she was in the room negotiating details was quite remarkable".

==== Ukraine ====
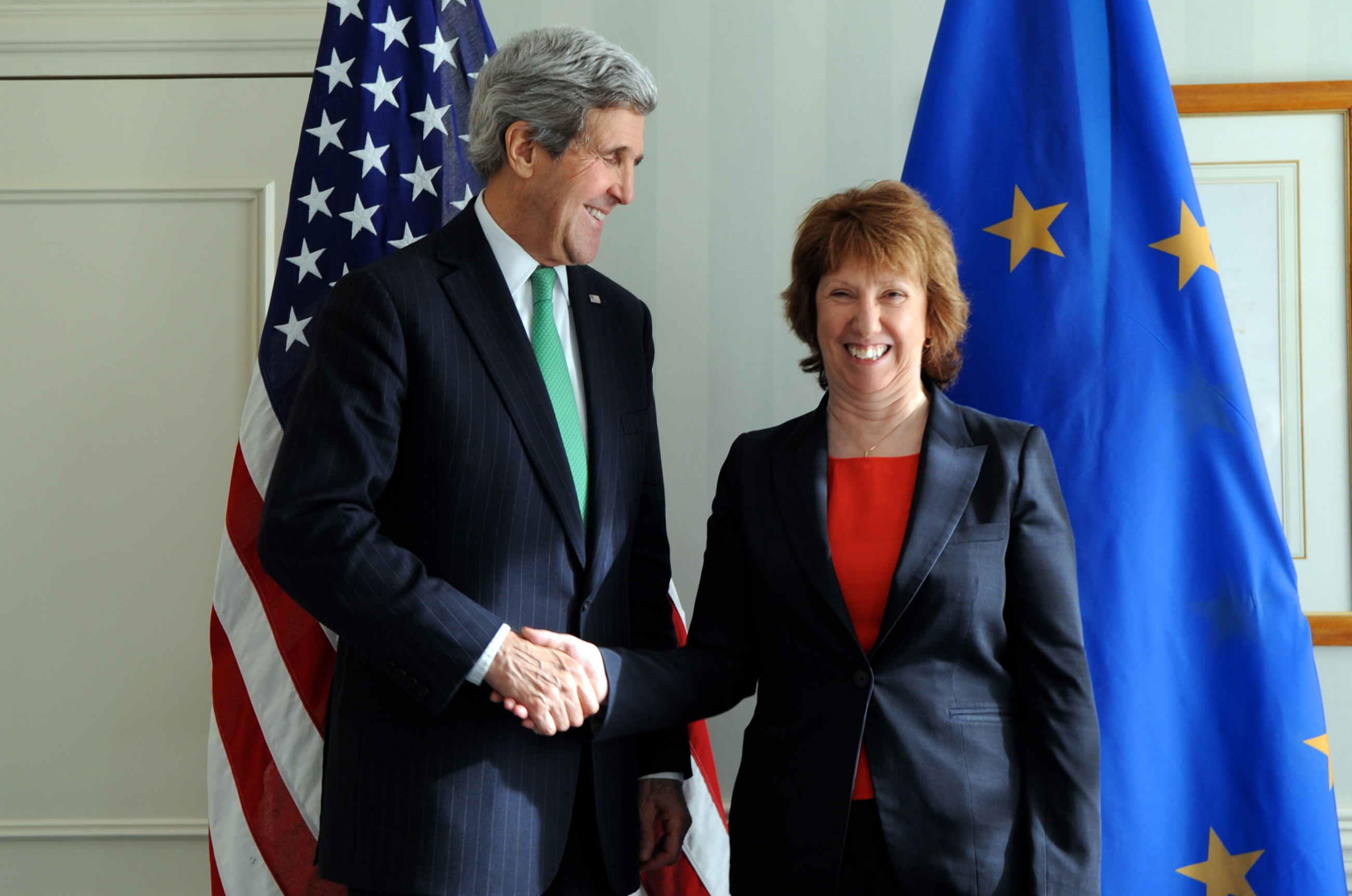
U.S. Secretary of State John Kerry with Ashton, Munich, 1 February 2014

In December 2013 Ashton visited Kyiv. She said she was impressed by the "determination of Ukrainians demonstrating for the European perspective of their country" and observed "with sadness that police used force to remove peaceful people from the center of Kyiv... Dialogue with political forces and society and the use of arguments is always better than the argument of force". Subsequently, Russian Deputy Prime Minister Dmitry Rogozin criticised Ashton's categorisation of the anti-government protests in Kyiv as peaceful in nature, pointing to the death of a number of police officers.

At the beginning of March a recording of a conversation between Ashton and the Estonian foreign minister Urmas Paet was released. In the call, Paet said he had been told by a woman doctor named Olga that snipers responsible for killing police and civilians in Kyiv last month were protest movement provocateurs rather than supporters of then-president Viktor Yanukovych. Ashton responds: "I didn't know … Gosh." "So there is a stronger and stronger understanding that behind snipers it was not Yanukovych, it was somebody from the new coalition", Paet says. Ashton replies: "I think we do want to investigate. I didn't pick that up, that's interesting. Gosh", she says. The Estonian foreign ministry confirmed the accuracy of the leak but clarified that "Foreign Minister Paet was giving an overview of what he had heard in Kyiv and expressed concern over the situation on the ground. We reject the claim that Paet was giving an assessment of the opposition's involvement in the violence." The woman doctor, Olga Bogomolets, said in an interview reported by Paul Waldie of The Globe and Mail that, in her conversation with the Estonian minister, "she did not indicate that protesters used snipers. She simply relayed to the Estonian minister what she saw that day – protesters shot in the head and heart. 'What I saw were people who were killed by snipers and only on [protesters'] side.'"

On 28 March 2014 Ashton issued a news release condemning violence by members of the Ukrainian nationalist political party Right Sector, stating, "I strongly condemn the pressure by activists of the Right Sector who have surrounded the building of the Verkhovna Rada of Ukraine. Such an intimidation of the parliament is against ... democratic principles and [the] rule of law. I call on the Right Sector and other parties in Ukraine to refrain from the use or threat of violence. They need to hand over any unauthorised arms to the authorities immediately."

==== Russia ====
President Putin signed the new treason law on 12 November 2012. Ashton expressed concern at the new law "potentially penalizing contacts with foreign nationals with up to 20 years in prison" and reducing "the burden of proof for charges of treason and espionage". The United Nations Committee Against Torture stated that the new law could prohibit sharing information on the human rights situation in Russia with the United Nations human rights organs. According to Ashton, the March 2013 inspection wave in Russia seemed aimed at "undermining civil society activities".

==== Egypt ====
Ashton condemned the "disproportionate" use of force by Egyptian security forces on August 14, 2013, when the security forces killed over 1000 people during the violent dispersal of mass anti-government sit-ins at Cairo's Rabaa al-Adawiya and al-Nahda squares.

=== Assessments ===
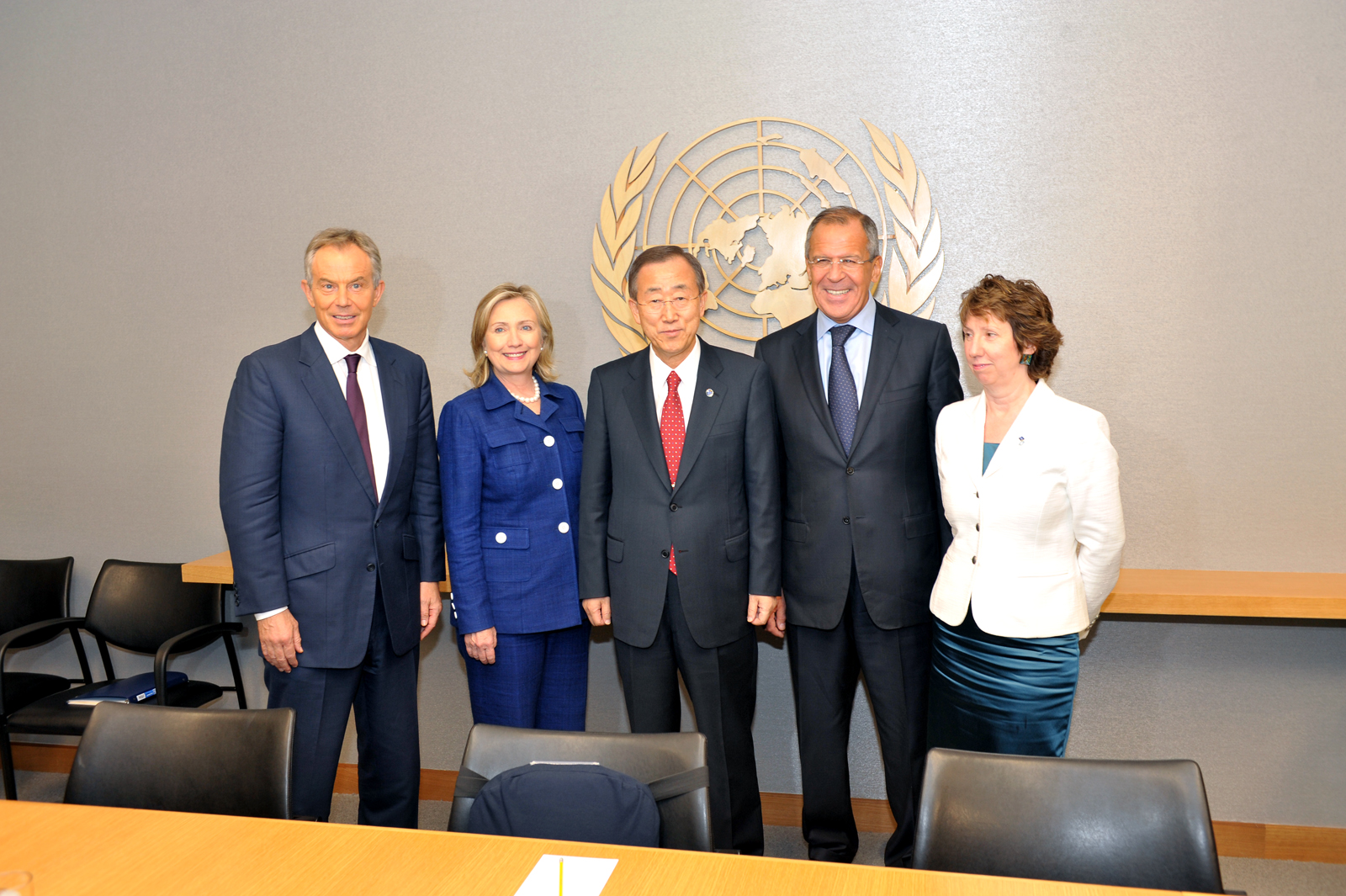
Ashton (far right) with the rest of the Quartet on the Middle East (2010)

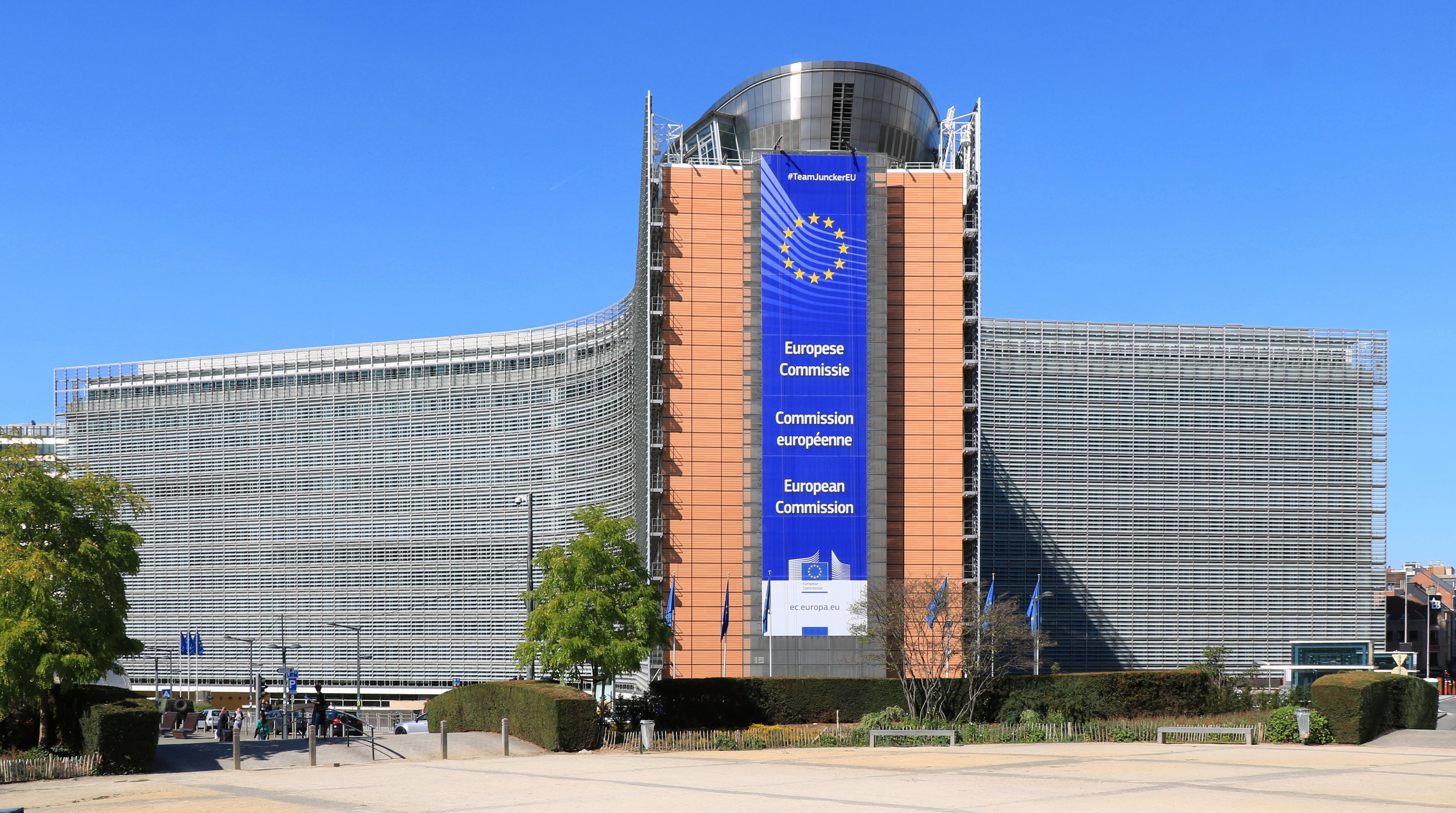
The European Commission, of which Ashton was Vice-President from 2010 to 2014

==== Early phase as EU High Representative ====
Ashton was questioned by Members of the European Parliament in 2009 about her role as national treasurer in the British Campaign for Nuclear Disarmament in the 1980s, amid claims by its opponents that it may have had financial links to the Soviet Union. Ashton responded that she had not taken any "direct money from communist countries". Much of the organisation's funds had been "collected in buckets" at marches and demonstrations, she said, adding that she was the first to order an audit of CND's finances. Her spokesman said: "She never visited the Soviet Union, she had no contacts with the Soviet Union and she never accepted money from Soviet sources ... She has never been a member of the Communist Party".

In February 2010, Ashton was criticised within the EU community for not visiting Haiti in the wake of the 2010 Haiti earthquake. A number of defence ministers reportedly also complained that she had not attended a European Defence Summit in Majorca. More broadly, senior officials within her team were said to complain that she spoke only in "generalities". A rumour that she switched off her phone after 8 pm every day was greeted by Ashton with ridicule.

In February 2011, Ashton received the lowest grade in a survey rating the performance of European Commissioners. The survey, carried out by lobbying and PR company Burson-Marsteller, asked 324 Brussels policy-makers to rate the European Commissioners with a grade of A to E (A being the highest). Ashton scored an E for her performance, the only Commissioner to receive a grade below D.

In March 2012, Ashton was criticised by Israeli politicians for comparing the shooting of Jewish children in Toulouse with the situation in Gaza. Ashton told Palestinian youths at a UNRWA event, "When we think of what happened in Toulouse today, when we remember what happened in Norway a year ago, when we know what is happening in Syria, when we see what is happening in Gaza and Sderot and in different parts of the world – we remember young people and children who lose their lives." After she was quoted in the press as not having mentioned the Israeli city of Sderot, Israeli politicians denounced her for equating the murder of three children and a rabbi in the shooting attack with the situation in Gaza. Her spokesman stated that her remark had been "grossly distorted" and that she had also referenced Israeli victims in Sderot, but this fact had been omitted from the original transcript.

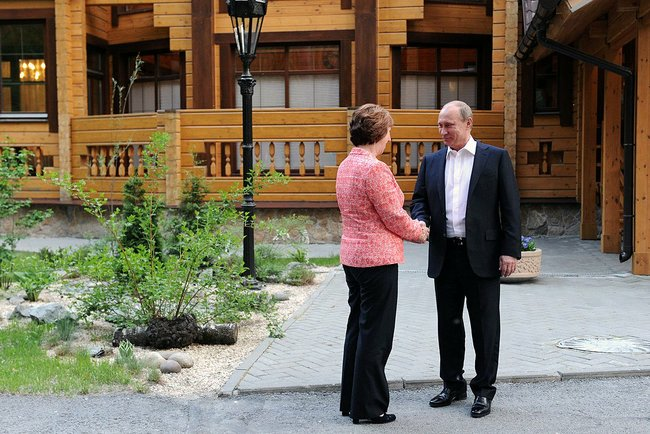
Ashton and Russian President Vladimir Putin, 3 June 2013

In counterpoint to earlier criticism of Ashton for not travelling enough, in September 2012 The Daily Telegraph criticised her for not being present in Brussels for enough European Commission meetings, reporting that Ashton had missed 21 out of 32 regular weekly meetings held so far that year. To the paper's complaint that Ashton's absences were "leaving Britain without a voice" at such meetings, European diplomatic officials said that, under EU treaties, commissioners serve as representatives not of individual member countries but of the European interest. Ashton's staff also pointed to her personal involvement in nuclear negotiations with Iran as among the international responsibilities that had kept her away from Commission meetings.

The Polish Minister for European and Economic Affairs, Mikolaj Dowgielewicz, stated in 2011 that criticism of Ashton was "a lot of hot air" and that "she has an impossible job to do and she is doing it well. At the end of her time in office, people will be more positive about what she has done. She will leave a real legacy."

Ashton was said in February 2010 to be angry over what she perceived as the "latent sexism" among some of her European peers that underpinned some of the criticisms aimed at her. She told the press that her work was sometimes hampered by the limited resources provided to her. She is not, for example, provided with her own aeroplane: something taken for granted by U.S. Secretaries of State.

==== Later phase as EU High Representative ====
The tone of public comment on Ashton's performance in office was subsequently to be influenced especially by her contributions to negotiations over Kosovo and Iran. In October 2013, Der Spiegel wrote of her:

But now the 57-year-old baroness is suddenly at the center of world diplomacy. And whenever she is mentioned, she earns praise for her hard-nosed negotiating skills, her stamina and her diplomatic talents. It is said that U.S. Secretary of State John Kerry has much faith in her. "She is discreet and perceptive, but also tenacious. That makes her an ideal negotiator", says Alexander Graf Lamsdorff, the head of Germany's business-friendly Free Democratic Party (FDP) in the European Parliament and a member of its Committee on Foreign Affairs.

One of the critics of Ashton's appointment came to concede her effectiveness in office. In September 2013, Peter Oborne, the chief political commentator of The Daily Telegraph, wrote:

Well, let's admit we were all completely wrong. It is now obvious that Catherine Ashton has been a success. In her unobtrusive but determined way, she can boast real achievement. Last year a peace deal was struck between Serbia and Kosovo. Nobody had thought it possible. It was a massive step towards healing ancient hatreds and building economic prosperity. It was brokered by Baroness Ashton.... I have never met Baroness Ashton but I guess that one of her secrets is that she keeps her head down, does not flaunt her ego, and allows others to take the credit. It takes little imagination to envisage how a male politician from any of the main parties would have exploited the Kosovo peace-deal, or the Morsi visit. She just kept her head down and quietly got on with her job.

In July 2014, as discussions took place on the selection of Ashton's successor, Paul Taylor of Reuters wrote in The New York Times, as part of a larger critique of the political nature of appointments to the European Commission:

While Ms. Ashton had some successes, brokering a first accord between Serbia and Kosovo and leading negotiations for an interim nuclear deal between Iran and world powers, critics say she has too often been missing in action closer to home.

Reflecting on her record, in July 2014, Adam Boulton in the UK's Sunday Times concluded:

As the European Union's high representative for foreign affairs and security policy, Catherine Ashton still bestrides the international stage four years after Gordon Brown, the man who gave her the job, was expelled from the corridors of power. She was a surprise nominee to everyone including herself, and few would have expected then that her successor as Britain's commissioner would struggle to match Baroness Ashton in calibre and clout.

== Personal life ==
Ashton lives in London with her husband, Peter Kellner, the former president of the online polling organisation, YouGov. Ashton and Kellner have been married since 1988. Ashton has two children and three stepchildren.

== Publications ==
- And Then What? Inside Stories of 21st-Century Diplomacy (Elliott & Thompson, London, 2023) ISBN 978-1-78396-634-9

== Other activities ==
Catherine Ashton is a member of the Global Leadership Foundation, an organisation that works to support democratic leadership, prevent and resolve conflict through mediation and promote good governance in the form of democratic institutions, open markets, human rights and the rule of law. It does so by making available, discreetly and in confidence, the experience of former leaders to today's national leaders. It is a not-for-profit organisation composed of former heads of government, senior governmental and international organisation officials who work closely with heads of government on governance-related issues of concern to them.

She has been the Chancellor of the University of Warwick since 2016.

== Honours and awards ==
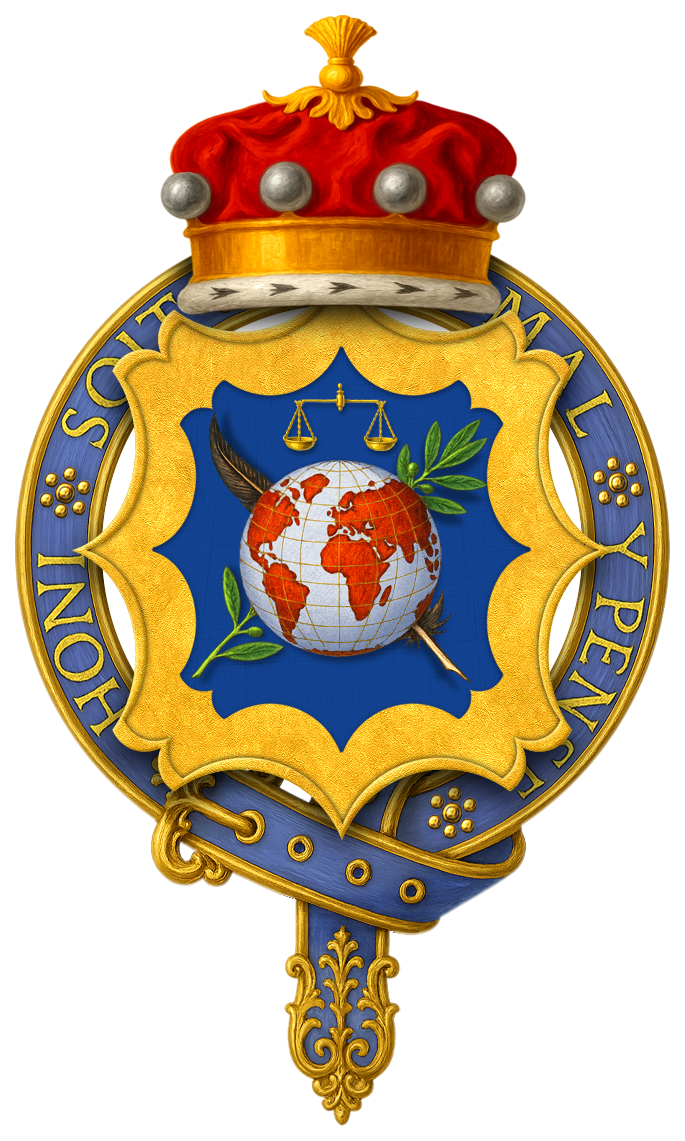
Garter-encircled arms of Catherine Margaret Ashton, Baroness Ashton of Upholland, LG, GCMG, PC

=== Awards ===
In February 2013, Ashton was assessed as one of the 100 most powerful women in the United Kingdom by Woman's Hour on BBC Radio 4.

She was awarded an honorary degree from the University of East London in 2005.

Country	Date	Appointment	Ribbon	Post Nominal Titles	Other
United Kingdom	23 April 2023	Lady Companion of the Most Noble Order of the Garter		LG	
United Kingdom	2015 New Year Honours	Dame Grand Cross of the Order of St Michael and St George		GCMG	
Slovakia	1 July 2014	2nd Class of the Order of the White Double Cross			

In 2019, she was appointed King of Arms of the Order of St Michael and St George. She was appointed chancellor of the order in 2022, and represented the order at the coronation of Charles III and Camilla in 2023. In December 2023, Ashton was awarded an honorary doctorate by Lancaster University.

Party political offices
Preceded by The Baroness Amos	Leader of the Labour Party in the House of Lords; 2007–2008	Succeeded by The Baroness Royall of Blaisdon
Political offices
Preceded by The Baroness Amos	Leader of the House of Lords; 2007–2008	Succeeded by The Baroness Royall of Blaisdon
Preceded by The Baroness Amos	Lord President of the Council; 2007–2008	Succeeded by The Baroness Royall of Blaisdon
Preceded by Peter Mandelson	British European Commissioner; 2008–2014	Succeeded by Jonathan Hill
Preceded by Peter Mandelson	European Commissioner for Trade; 2008–2009	Succeeded by Benita Ferrero-Waldner
Preceded by Javier Solana as High Representative for Common Foreign and Security Policy	High Representative for Foreign Affairs and Security Policy; 2009–2014	Succeeded by Federica Mogherini
Preceded by Margot Wallström	First Vice-President of the European Commission; 2010–2014	Succeeded by Frans Timmermans
Academic offices
Preceded by Sir Richard Lambert	Chancellor of the University of Warwick; 2017–present	Incumbent
