= John Methven =

British businessman

Sir John Methven
- Born: Malcolm John Methven; February 1, 1926; Ledbury, United Kingdom
- Died: April 23, 1980 (aged 54); London
- Education: Gonville and Caius College, Cambridge
- Occupation: Businessman
- Known for: Director General of the Confederation of British Industry (1976–1980)
- Spouse: Margaret Field Nicholas (m. 1952; div. 1977) Karen Jane Caldwell (m. 1977)
- Children: 3

Sir Malcolm John Methven (14 February 1926 – 23 April 1980) was a British businessman who was the Director General of the Confederation of British Industry from 1976 to 1980.

== Early life ==
Malcolm John Methven was born on 14 February 1926 in Ledbury, the son of Lieutenant-Colonel Malcolm David Methven OBE, and his wife, Helen Marion Watson.

Methven was educated at Mill Hill School and then studied law at Gonville and Caius College, Cambridge. There he was a Tapp exhibitioner. He gained his law tripos in 1949 and qualified as a solicitor in 1950.

== Career ==
He joined Birmingham Corporation as a lawyer in 1952 but left local government in 1957 to serve as lawyer to ICI (metals) in Birmingham, later relocating to Millbank in London. In 1968 he was placed in charge of purchasing and in 1970 became Deputy Chairman of ICI's Mond division. He left ICI in 1973 to become the first Director General of the newly created Office of Fair Trading. In 1976 he became Director General of the Confederation of British Industry.

== Personal life and death ==
In 1952 he married Margaret Field Nicholas, daughter of Air Commodore Charles Henry Nicholas (1894–1966). They had three daughters before divorce in 1977. Later in 1977 he married Karen Jane Caldwell, daughter of Walter Anderson Caldwell, a research chemist.

He died in King Edward VII Hospital, London on 23 April 1980 of a heart attack following a routine operation aged 54.

== Recognition ==
Methven was knighted by Queen Elizabeth II in 1978.

A bronze bust of Methven by Franta Belsky stands at the entrance of the Methven Room at CBI headquarters at Centre Point in London.

Political offices
Preceded by Sir Campbell Adamson	Director-General of the CBI; 1976 – 1980	Succeeded by Sir Terence Beckett
