= Lawrence Michael Brown =

British materials scientist

Lawrence Michael Brown FRS HonFRMS (born 18 March 1936) is a British material scientist. He is emeritus fellow at Robinson College, Cambridge.

In 2017 he was made an Honorary Fellow of the Royal Microscopical Society (HonFRMS) for his contributions to microscopy.

== Life ==
He was W. M. Tapp Fellow at Gonville and Caius College, Cambridge.
