= John Cridland =

British business executive (born 1961)

John Cridland CBE
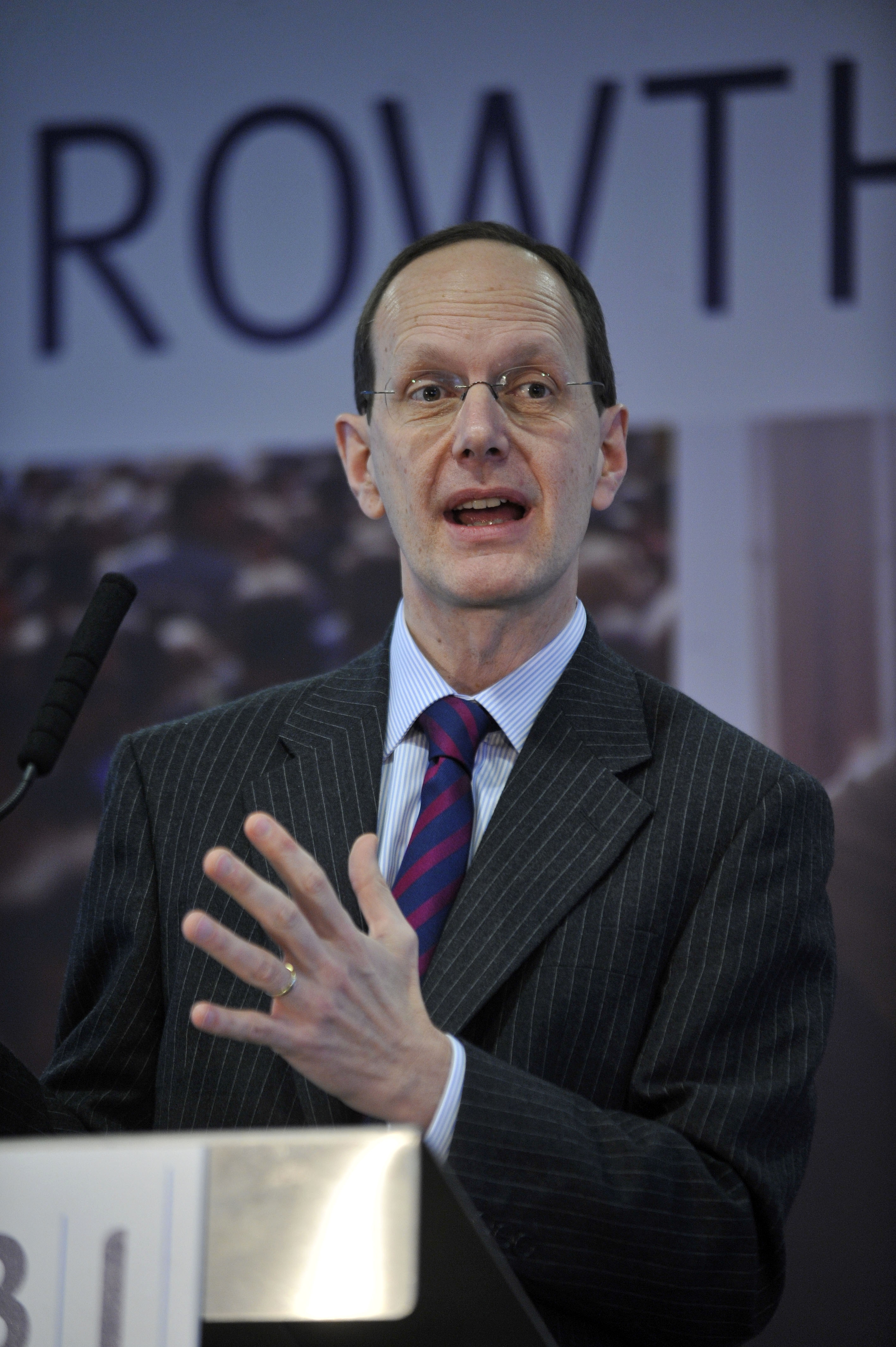
- Cridland speaking at the CBI
- Born: 3 February 1961 (age 65)
- Citizenship: British
- Education: Boston Grammar School; Christ's College, Cambridge
- Occupation: Business executive
- Title: Director-General of the Confederation of British Industry
- Term: January 2011 – November 2015
- Successor: Carolyn Fairbairn
- Awards: CBE (2006)

John Cridland, CBE (born 3 February 1961) is a British business executive. He was the tenth Director-General of the Confederation of British Industry (CBI) from January 2011 to November 2015.

== Education ==
Cridland was educated at Boston Grammar School and studied Indian and African history at Christ's College, Cambridge.

== Career ==
He joined the CBI as a policy adviser in 1982 and became its youngest ever director in 1991, when he took over the environmental affairs brief. He moved on to human resources policy in 1995, where he helped negotiate the UK's first national minimum wage and entry into the European Union's "social chapter" on employment conditions. He was promoted to the post of deputy director-general in 2000.

Beyond his work with the CBI, Cridland served on the Low Pay Commission from its formation in 1997 until 2007. He was vice chair of the National Learning and Skills Council between 2007 and 2010 and spent 10 years on the Low Pay Commission and the council of the conciliation service, ACAS. He was also a member of the Commission on Environmental Markets and Economic Performance and the Women and Work Commission; vice-chairman of the Learning and Skills Council; a board member of Business in the Community; a UK Commissioner for Employment and Skills and a member of the council of Cranfield University.

He announced his decision to step down as director-general in March 2015, saying "I'm a big Star Trek fan and just like James Kirk I have always told colleagues at internal meetings that I saw this as part of a five-year journey." His resignation followed in November. He was succeeded by Carolyn Fairbairn.

Cridland was appointed a CBE for services to business in 2006 and honorary doctorates from the University of Lincoln in 2011 and the University of Bedfordshire in 2013. Unlike his five predecessors, he was not awarded a knighthood, at the end of his term as director general at CBI.

In March 2016, the Department for Work and Pensions announced that Cridland would lead the UK's first State Pension age review.

He was the first chair of Transport for the North (TfN), the first sub-national transport body in the UK, and was installed in the role in November 2015. In May 2021, it was announced he would stand down from the role later that year. He formally ended his term as Chairman in July 2021.

== Personal life ==
He is married with two children.

Preceded by Richard Lambert	Director-General of the Confederation of British Industry; 2011-2015	Succeeded by Carolyn Fairbairn
