= Nancy Durham =

Canadian journalist

- Born: 1952 or 1953 (age 73–74); Canada
- Education: York University
- Occupations: Journalist; Lavender farmer and distiller
- Known for: CBC, Welsh Lavender Ltd
- Spouse: William Newton-Smith (m. 1989)

Nancy Durham (born 1952 or 1953) is a Canadian journalist.

== Personal life ==
Durham studied at York University. In 1981, she met Oxford philosopher of science William Newton-Smith (1943–2023) at a party in Toronto. In 1984 she moved to the UK to be closer to Newton-Smith, and in 1989 they wed.

== Journalism ==
In 1976 she joined CBC Radio as a radio reporter in Toronto, moving to the Fredericton, New Brunswick, station in 1979. After emigrating to the UK in 1984 she continued to work as a journalist for the CBC as well as with the BBC. In 1994 she became a video journalist covering the breakup of Yugoslavia from all sides in the conflict. Her television work took her across Europe, the former USSR, Africa, Europe, and Iraq. She is an occasional presenter on Monocle 24 internet radio and a trustee of the Open Society Foundations, London.

Durham was recognized by the Canadian Association of Journalists for her investigation of the 2004 fire aboard the submarine HMCS Chicoutimi.

== Lavender farming ==
In 2003 she and her husband planted a field of lavender on their farm in mid Wales, the first to do so in Wales on a field scale. They have since expanded their operations becoming the only distillers of lavender oil in Wales. Their company, Welsh Lavender Ltd, produces face and body creams.
