= Carolyn Fairbairn =

British businesswoman

Dame Carolyn Fairbairn DBE
- Born: Carolyn Julie Fairbairn; 13 December 1960 (age 65)
- Education: Gonville and Caius College, Cambridge; University of Pennsylvania; INSEAD
- Occupations: Director-general, Confederation of British Industry
- Spouse: Peter Chittick
- Children: 3

Dame Carolyn Julie Fairbairn DBE (born 13 December 1960) is a British businesswoman, former director-general of the Confederation of British Industry, and a former non-executive director of the Competition and Markets Authority, Lloyds Banking Group, BAE Systems, and the UK Statistics Authority. She has been the chair of Mencap since March 2022.

== Early life and education ==
Fairbairn attended Bryanston School as a sixth-form scholar. She graduated with a BA in economics (double first) from Gonville and Caius College, Cambridge, then an MA in international relations from the University of Pennsylvania, followed by an MBA from INSEAD in France.

== Career ==
She began her career as an economist at the World Bank. In 1985, she became a business and financial journalist, writing for The Economist magazine.

In 1988, she joined McKinsey & Company as a management consultant and, during a seven-year career, rose to partner. She worked with companies in sectors including brewing, DIY retailing, computer services, investment management and newspapers, advising on mergers, business expansion, cost control and global competitiveness. In 1995, she joined the Downing Street Policy Unit under the then prime minister, John Major, developing policy for health and social services.

In 1997, Fairbairn was appointed director of strategy for BBC Worldwide, later promoted to director of strategy ad distribution, and also became a member of the BBC's executive board. She was responsible for delivery of the BBC's services to viewers, including on cable and satellite. She managed a budget of £150 million and negotiated the BBC's major distribution deals with Sky, Virgin and BT. She helped to develop the BBC's digital strategy and renewal of its charter, and was instrumental in creating One BBC. In 2002/3, she created and launched Freeview – a joint venture between the BBC, Sky and Arqiva, which became one of the UK's most successful new television services.

On 6 October 2004, the BBC announced that Fairbairn and her husband had "decided to take time out from their careers to spend a year travelling around the world with their three children".

Fairbairn briefly rejoined McKinsey & Company in 2006, before becoming director of corporate development and strategy at ITV plc between 2007 and 2010. She joined the company at a time of crisis as the advertising market collapsed following the financial crash. She was put in charge of ITV's emergency cost-reduction programme to cut the company's cost base by 25%. This enabled ITV to weather the storm and subsequently return to growth.

On 24 July 2013 David Currie, the chairman-designate of the new Competition and Markets Authority, announced Fairbairn's appointment as a non-executive director. Between 2008 and 2011, Carolyn was a non-executive director of the Financial Services Authority.

Fairbairn has extensive boardroom experience, including as a non-executive director of Lloyds Banking Group (2012-15), The Vitec Group, a medium-sized photographic and broadcast equipment supplier (2012-1), the global outsourcer Capita (2014-15) and the UK Statistics Authority (2013-15).

In March 2021, she was appointed non-executive director of BAE Systems plc. She resigned just over a year later in May 2022 to take up the position of Chair of the Royal Mencap Society.

== Confederation of British Industry (CBI) ==
In June 2015, it was announced that she would replace John Cridland in November as director-general of the Confederation of British Industry, as a result of which she would resign all other positions aside from her chair of the charity, Marie Curie Cancer Care.

Fairbairn has spoken about her vision for the CBI saying, "I've spent most of my working life in British business and believe deeply in its purpose as a creator of fulfilling jobs, quality of life and prosperity. I'm committed to using my experience to speak up passionately on behalf of British businesses of all sizes on the national and international stage."

In June 2020, the CBI announced that Fairbairn would step down at the end of 2020 and would be replaced by Tony Danker.

== Personal life ==
She is married to Peter Chittick and they have three children. Chittick is Canadian, trained as a lawyer, and met Fairbairn when they were students at INSEAD. He is a multimillionaire property developer, and together they own the boutique Hotel Crillon Le Brave in Provence, France.

Business positions
Preceded by John Cridland	Director-General of the Confederation of British Industry; 2015–2020	Succeeded by Tony Danker
