= Campbell Adamson =

Scottish industrialist (1922-2000)

Sir Campbell Adamson
- Born: 26 June 1922; Perth, Scotland
- Died: 21 August 2000 (aged 78)
- Citizenship: British
- Occupation: Industrialist

Sir William Owen Campbell Adamson (26 June 1922 – 21 August 2000) was a British industrialist, who was best known for his work as director-general of the Confederation of British Industry (CBI) from 1969 to 1976. He rose through the steel industry, where he was in charge of labour relations, and worked as a government adviser during the late 1960s.

Coming to the CBI at the peak of political controversy over the Labour government's attempt to reform trade union law, Adamson held the difficult role of representing industry through the complex struggle over Edward Heath's Industrial Relations Bill. Remarks he made about Government policy on the eve of the February 1974 election were blamed by Heath for the Conservative Party's loss of the election. Adamson was able to unite industry to support the British application to join the European Communities. In later life as Chairman of Abbey National, Adamson led the move to demutualise and convert it from a building society to a bank, and saw an overwhelming majority of the society's members support the move. Also interested in family policy, he set up the Family Policy Studies Centre.

== Family and education ==
Adamson was born in Perth, the only son of John Adamson who was a chartered accountant. His father was a strong Scottish patriot who was said to dislike "even the idea of living south of the border", but was persuaded by an attractive job offer to do so. Campbell Adamson was sent to Rugby School, and then went up to Corpus Christi College, Cambridge where he read economics under John Maynard Keynes.

In 1945, he married Gilvray Allan (d.1988), a sociologist: they had four children. They divorced in 1984. He married secondly, in 1984, Mimi Lloyd-Chandler.

== Entry into steel industry ==
Due to hereditary night-blindness, Adamson was rejected for military service during World War II, despite his efforts to offer his services; instead he joined the Royal Institute of International Affairs. As the war was coming to an end, Adamson took a post in industry as a management trainee for steelmaker Baldwins based in south Wales. Once trained he became general manager of the Spencer Steelworks at Llanwern; the steel industry was undergoing major changes at the time due to nationalisation and Baldwins merged with Richard Thomas in 1948 as part of the 'Steel Company of Wales'. Adamson was in charge of labour relations and his method of fair negotiation with the trade unions gave him a reputation which extended outside the steel industry.

Although the Conservative government from 1951 wanted to privatise the steel industry, it was unable to sell the Steel Company of Wales due to its size; however, it tried to operate as though in private ownership. Adamson became a Director of Richard Thomas and Baldwins in 1959, and in 1960 he was appointed to the council of the Iron and Steel Institute. His position made him politically prominent. Adamson was not a supporter of the Labour Party (claiming that hearing Herbert Morrison speak of the party's virtues had put him off), but he was known to be a 'liberal capitalist with a profound social awareness'.

== Civil service posts ==
After the Labour government created the Department of Economic Affairs, Adamson was invited to take a role with the civil service. He became Industrial Policy Co-ordinator and the head of a team of industrial advisors from July 1967. However the post offered little opportunity for Adamson. The whole steel industry was renationalised, and the chairman Lord Melchett wanted to give him a senior role but nothing came of it. Adamson had already been named as a member of the BBC General Advisory Council in October 1964.

== Recruitment by the CBI ==
At the end of April 1969, Adamson left the Department of Economic Affairs, just as rumours circulated that the department would be abolished. He intended to seek another position in the steel business. In the meantime he decided to take a long holiday and go on a three-month safari drive across the Sahara with his wife. Just as they were about to depart, John Davies telephoned to tell Adamson that he was about to leave his job as Director-General of the Confederation of British Industry and to suggest that Adamson put his name forward. The Adamsons went on their holiday as arranged, leaving poste restante addresses in Algiers and Cairo, and it was at the latter where Adamson received the letter formally inviting him to take up the post.

Adamson accepted his new post, declaring as he did so that he was firmly supportive of the Government's application for membership of the European Common Market. In his first major policy speech he stressed the need for investment in modern plant and equipment. In his first year, he opposed plans by the Labour government to merge the Monopolies Commission and the Prices and Incomes Board, plans which were dropped when the Labour government was defeated.

== Prices and incomes policy ==
During the 1970 general election campaign, Adamson presented a "hastily-prepared" paper on wage settlements to the CBI council, and issued a warning to the major political parties that the new Government must do something to restrain wage increases, including a new prices and incomes policy if needed. Late in the campaign, Adamson held talks with Trades Union Congress general secretary Victor Feather to negotiate a voluntary productivity, prices and incomes policy. Adamson felt that the CBI ought to be fundamentally engaged in attempts to secure industrial peace.

After the Conservatives took power, Adamson welcomed the abolition of the Prices and Incomes Board and the requirement for companies to give "early warning" of pay and price increases. Adamson generally welcomed the Government's policy of non-intervention in industry, but made Ministers (including his predecessor John Davies, who had become Minister of Technology) aware that there would still be a role for the Industrial Reorganisation Corporation and that investment grants should not be altered too speedily for industry to adjust.

Throughout 1971, Adamson worked with CBI members to persuade them to restrain pay rises; it was revealed in April 1971 that he had talked personally with Vic Feather of the TUC about an agreement between them, which Adamson thought "much nearer than it was before". The TUC wanted the agreement to include prices and dividends, which the CBI accepted in principle. Adamson worked to get agreement on prices, and on 8 September 176 of the 201 largest member companies in the CBI signed an undertaking to hold prices stable (or at least restrict rises to no more than 5%) for 12 months. The agreement was held to be binding on all 900 members of the CBI. Adamson was later to cite the agreement by industry to restrain prices over 1971–72 as his greatest achievement; it allowed the Government's prices policy to half the rate of inflation.

== Industrial relations ==
The Conservatives had come to power with a pledge to reform industrial relations laws. When the detailed proposals were unveiled in October 1970, Adamson gave a welcome for the principle while observing that they were more far-reaching than the CBI's suggestions on enforceability of agreements. The plans were vociferously opposed by the trade unions. Adamson largely stayed out of the debate over the Industrial Relations Bill during its stormy passage through Parliament, but tried to play the role of an intermediary between the Government and the National Union of Mineworkers after the union went on strike in early 1972, making another plea for greater co-operation between unions and management.

With the Industrial Relations Act coming into effect, at the beginning of August 1972 Adamson agreed with Victor Feather of the TUC to set up an independent conciliation and advice service. According to Feather both sides saw this as one means of minimising the use of the Act. Through 1973 the government, CBI and TUC tried to establish a working relationship which suited all, but were unable to do so before the economic effects of the oil price rise caused profound disruption to the British economy. On other issues Adamson was strongly supportive of the Government, including giving consistent backing to entry to the European Communities. His leadership in this area was said to be crucial.

== Miners' strike ==
Following the oil shock, the NUM renewed its claim for a substantial wage increase, a claim which broke government pay guidelines, and then began industrial action in the form of an overtime ban in support of the claim. The sudden shortage of coal in the middle of the winter forced the Government to announce a 'three-day week' of restrictions of electricity by industry. Adamson deplored the move but regarded it as the lesser of two evils because industry might not be able to operate at all. Adamson supported the Government's refusal to concede the miners' pay claim because of concerns that other wage claims would follow, although he conceded that it could be supported if there was a watertight guarantee that other unions would settle within the limits.

Later in January 1974 Adamson called for a relaxation to a five-day working week and industry undertaking voluntary power-saving measures. Adamson and the CBI accepted, although not without reservation, the Government's proposal for an inquiry by a Pay Relativities Board into comparisons between pay for miners and for other workers, although the confederation decided against submitting evidence.

== February 1974 general election ==
When the miners had converted their overtime ban into an all-out strike, Prime Minister Edward Heath called a snap general election. Two days before polling day, on Tuesday 26 February, Adamson addressed a conference of senior managers organised by the Industrial Society at which he was asked what the Conservatives should do, if re-elected, about the Industrial Relations Act. Adamson replied "if I were them I would try to get close to the unions and hammer out something better (than the Act)", going on to say that amendment of the Act was not possible because "it is so surrounded by hatred that we must have a more honest try at another Act".

Adamson did not realise that his words were being recorded by the BBC. The next day's edition of The Guardian led with a report of the speech headlined "CBI slips an Ace into Wilson's hand", and it had wide publicity in other newspapers. CBI President Sir Michael Clapham dissociated the organisation from Adamson's view, and other industrialists were heavily critical.

Late on Wednesday 27 February, Adamson offered his resignation to Clapham (the news did not become public until the following day); Clapham refused to accept it, writing back that Adamson was "perhaps uniquely qualified to organize" the CBI and deal with government. However, Adamson insisted and Clapham undertook to consult with members. In the meantime the election resulted in the surprise defeat of Edward Heath; the incoming government swiftly abolished the Industrial Relations Act. According to George Clark, the political correspondent of The Times, Adamson's remarks, made just two days before the election, "caused dismay in the Conservative camp". Labour Party leaders quickly seized on Adamson's comments, stating that proved the need "for everything they (had)... been urging on the Government", with James Callaghan, then chairman of the party, stating that Adamson's views showed that both the CBI and the TUC now supported Labour policy. Responding for the Conservatives, Home Secretary Robert Carr said the comments were "a very sudden change" of position by Adamson. Edward Heath's first reaction was to stress that Adamson's expressed views were personal and that they did not represent the official position of the CBI. However, Heath would acknowledge after the election was over that Adamson's intervention did have a negative impact on the Conservative Party's re-election campaign. In his memoirs Heath went further, as he disputed that Adamson could have been unaware he was being recorded, and wrote that "If Campbell Adamson had wanted Labour to win, he could not have worked more effectively on their behalf".

== Last years at the CBI ==
Adamson was certainly not regarded as a weak figure, and was said to have been nicknamed "Campbell Adamant" to political figures and to union leaders. However within the CBI, suspicion of Adamson and his public role continued for a year after the row over his 1974 remarks. In June 1974, a group of 20 senior industrialists asked the new President of the CBI Ralph Bateman for reforms in policy making including more control over the confederation's paid administrators.

Adamson had a difficult relationship with Tony Benn as Secretary of State for Industry after March 1974. He was opposed to the proposal for a National Enterprise Board, and at a meeting with Benn on 12 February 1975 outlined five points of concern about the Industry Bill being prepared by the Department. Benn regarded Adamson as having outlined the basis of the attack on the Bill.

In June 1975 Adamson announced to the CBI grand council that he would resign and leave office in mid-1976; it was briefed that his departure was unconnected to the remarks about the Industrial Relations Act. Adamson stressed that the job was demanding and it was time for someone to inject new ideas. Sir John Methven was named as his successor at the end of January 1976. Adamson handed over on 1 July; he had received a Knighthood in the New Year's Honours List of 1976.

== Royal Statistical Society ==
Campbell Adamson is the only person ever to be put forward as president of the Royal Statistical Society not to be elected. Having lost as election to the council of the society in the previous year, he was nominated as president. This resulted in the only contested election in the history of the society, when members put forward Henry Wynn as an alternative candidate.

== Abbey National ==
Valued for his business expertise, Adamson picked up several directorships in industry and finance after he left the CBI. He was a director of the Imperial Group and of Renold from 1976, and of Revertex Chemicals and Lazard Bros. & Co. from 1977; in addition he was Vice-Chairman of the National Savings Committee from 1975 to 1977. Then in 1978 he was appointed Chairman of Abbey National Building Society; Adamson welcomed the opportunity of modernising the society. In December 1979 Abbey National sponsored and hosted an exhibition set up by the British Youth Council (then led by Peter Mandelson) aimed at promoting good race relations, with Adamson saying that the society agreed with it and wanted to attract young people to invest with them.

=== Demutualisation ===
By the late 1980s Adamson had decided that the way forward for Abbey National was to abandon its status as a mutual society and turn itself into a public limited company where it could compete with the banks. This move went against the culture of the society, and a long debate went on internally about whether the move would cause more problems. Eventually in March 1988 the Abbey National board voted unanimously to recommend to members that the society should "demutualise".

Using the slogan "The Vote, The Float", the Abbey National board overcame fierce opposition from some members and won approval with 90% of the vote; the society floated in 1989, becoming the Abbey bank. This was the first building society to make the move but it kicked off a general move which transformed British financial services. The flotation having been completed, Adamson retired after 13 years at Abbey in 1991.

== Family policy ==
In 1980 Adamson chaired the 'Study Commission on the Family', an independent body set up with finance from the Leverhulme Trust which looked into the effects of marital breakdown on society. The Study Commission intended itself to be seen as an unofficial Royal commission. So interested was he in the subject that in 1984 he set up the full-time Family Policy Studies Centre charity, and recruited future MP Malcolm Wicks as its director.

That same year Adamson was granted a divorce from his wife on grounds of her unreasonable behaviour. Soon after he married Mimi Lloyd Chandler an American; they had a terraced house in Battersea and a country home in Oxfordshire. He chaired the Independent Broadcasting Telethon Trust from 1988 and was elected to an honorary fellowship of Corpus Christi College in January 1997. He was a governor at Bedford College, University of London from 1983 to 1985.

Political offices
Preceded by John Davies	Director-General of the CBI; 1969–1976	Succeeded by John Methven
