= Arthur March Tapp =

English accountant and company director

Arthur March Tapp (1826/7–1916) was an English accountant to the railway contractors Brassey, and company director.

== Background ==
He was the son of Charles Tapp of Fyfield, Hampshire. A report of the 1917 memorial service for Tapp, at which Donald Tait spoke, mentioned a church window at Fyfield dedicated to the family members Nicholas Tapp (1700–1796), John Tapp (1747–1810) and Charles Tapp (1790–1855).

== Career ==
Tapp began work aged 15. He acted for a period as accountant to Brassey, Jackson & Henfrey, railway contractors, and was involved in major railway construction contracts. He was also the financial secretary to Thomas Brassey, and a confidential adviser. He accompanied Brassey on business trips in continental Europe.

In 1883 business premises at 4 Great George Street, London were shared by Tapp, his son Nicholas and the accountant Henry T. Bird, with Sir Thomas Brassey and others.

=== Directorships ===
Tapp was a director of the Evesham and Redditch Railway company that built the Ashchurch–Barnt Green line from Birmingham into the West of England in the 1860s, headed by Thomas Brassey.

Tapp was also a director of the Southend Waterworks Company, incorporated in 1879, with Henry Leonard Campbell Brassey. He was a director of the Buenos Aires and Ensenada Port Railway in the 1880s. He was a director of the Powell Duffryn Steam Coal Company from 1889, still active in the role to 1914.

== Death and legacy ==
Arthur March Tapp died in 1916 aged 89, leaving over £100,000. A monumental plaque designed by Ernest George was placed on the north wall of the nave of St Mary's Church, Shortlands, to Tapp and his wife Caroline.

== Family ==
Tapp married Caroline (1826–1906). He was survived by six of their children, three sons and three daughters, two of his sons having predeceased him. These children attended their mother's funeral. The sons were:

- Charles James Tapp (1856–1902), eldest son, a member of the London Stock Exchange, married in 1882 Olga Marie Henriette Andreae. Theodore Tapp was their son.
- Arthur Tapp (born 1858), second son, a surveyor and estate manager, married in 1888 Beatrice Maude Sentance, daughter of William Sentance. He travelled in 1886 to Michigan with Thomas Allnutt Brassey.
- Nicholas Tapp (1858–1921), third son, chartered accountant qualified in 1883. That year Tapp & Bird were acting as railway company auditors from 4 Great George Street; in 1885 Nicholas Tapp of Tapp & Bird was running a company liquidation from St. Clement's House in the City of London.
- William Munro Tapp (1859–1936), English solicitor and company director.
- Alfred Horace Tapp (1863–1901), youngest son, mining engineer, who worked at the silver lead foundry at Pertusola, near Lerici in Italy. Among his father's directorships in 1892 was with the Continental Lead and Iron Co., name changed the following year to Società di Pertusola.

The daughters were:

- Rosa Ellen Tapp (1864 – 10 November 1930), married name Varley. She was an artist, exhibiting at the Society of Women Artists in the period 1905 to 1927. In 1887 she had been awarded a Crystal Palace School silver medal for painting, as a pupil of Edward Angelo Goodall. She showed with Frank Spenlove-Spenlove's Yellow Door School, as Miss R. Tapp of Shortlands, and in 1913 at the Paris salon. That year, also, she had a painting in the annual exhibition of the Royal Cambrian Academy of Art, and is mentioned in the index as an Associate of the Society of Women Artists.
- Catherine (Caty) (1866–1937), second daughter, married in 1912 William Taylor Alway at Newchang (Yingkou). She left money to family members including great-nephew Theodore Charles Tapp.
- Annie Caroline (1868–1925), third daughter.
