= Lambert Review =

The Lambert Review of Business-University Collaboration was a report by Richard Lambert published by Her Majesty's Treasury in the United Kingdom in 2003, which made "a series of recommendations aimed at smoothing out the path between Britain’s strong science base and the business community" [HM Treasury 2003a]. The Lambert Review concluded that the British dual support system acts as a disincentive to business-university collaboration [HM Treasury 2003, p5] and that the biggest single challenge for knowledge transfer is in boosting the demand for research from non-academic communities, rather in increasing the supply of ideas and services from universities [p10].

The Treasury advised that:

- the best form of knowledge transfer comes when a talented researcher moves out of the university and into business, or vice versa. [p12]
- the most exciting collaborations arise as a result of like-minded people getting together – sometimes by chance – to address a problem. [p12]
- encouraging academics and business people to spend more time together should be a high priority for knowledge transfer professionals. [p12]
- the innovation process is non-linear, so knowledge transfer is not simply a question of channeling clever ideas from researchers down a production line into commercialisation. "Great ideas emerge out of all kinds of feedback loops, development activities and sheer chance. This is another reason why it is so critical to build dynamic networks between academic researchers and their business counterparts." [p12]
- diversity is good, both in mission and in funding. "The type of business collaboration that would make sense for one kind of university might be either impossible or irrelevant for another." [p13]
- proximity matters when it comes to business collaboration. [p13]
- "business-university collaborations need careful and consistent management by both sides, and a number of joint programmes have failed for lack of such attention". [p13]
- an emphasis on knowledge transfer requires institutions to put in place new mechanisms for establishing institutional priorities. [p13]
- universities are more complex to manage than businesses, with a variety of different stakeholders – academics, students, and funders. [p13]
- that the large number of pots of ring-fenced financing is 'the source of endless unnecessary frustration'. [p13]

== Sources ==
- Lambert Review of Business-University Collaboration, HM Treasury, December 2003.
