= Terence Beckett =

British businessman

Sir Terence Norman Beckett KBE (13 December 1923 – 2 May 2013) was a British businessman, who was chairman of Ford and later became director-general of the Confederation of British Industry.

== Early life ==
Beckett was born on 13 December 1923 in Walsall, Staffordshire, England. He was educated at the private Wolverhampton Grammar School. He then went on to study mechanical engineering at Wolverhampton and Staffordshire Technical college (now Wolverhampton University).

On 14 July 1945, towards the end of World War II, Beckett was commissioned in the British Army as a second lieutenant of the Royal Electrical and Mechanical Engineers. He was given the service number 352178. He saw active service in India and Malaya. He was promoted to lieutenant on 1 January 1949 and granted the honorary rank of captain. He took a BSc in economics at the London School of Economics.

== Honours and decorations ==
Beckett received the General Service Medal (1918) with Malaya clasp for his service during the Malayan Emergency.

He was appointed Commander of the Order of the British Empire (CBE) in 1974. He was knighted in 1978. He was promoted to Knight Commander of the Order of the British Empire (KBE) in 1987.

Beckett received an honorary doctorate from Heriot-Watt University. in 1981

Political offices
Preceded by John Methven	Director-General of the CBI; 1980 – 1987	Succeeded by John Banham
