= Digby Jones, Baron Jones of Birmingham =

British businessman and politician (born 1955)

The Right Honourable The Lord Jones of Birmingham
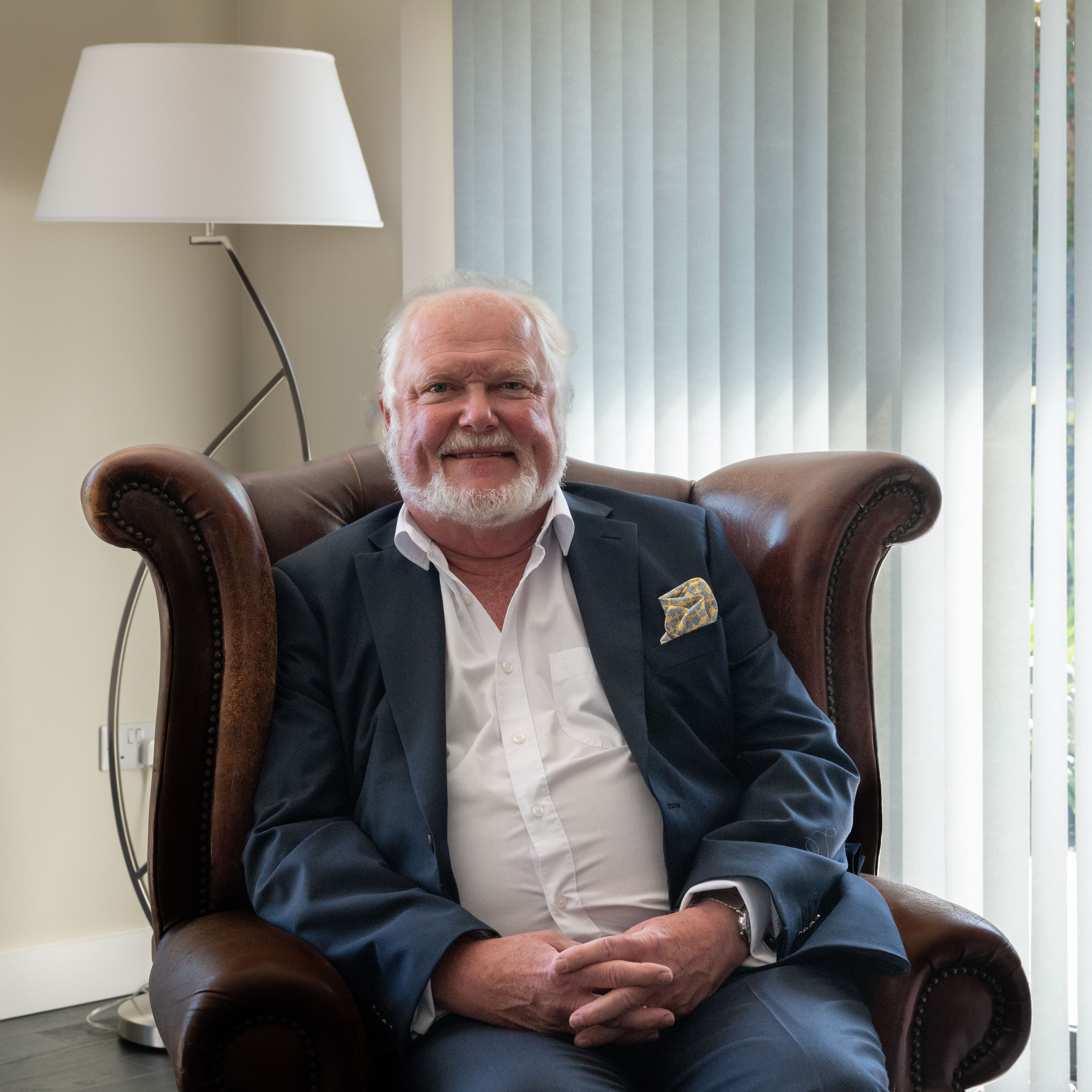
- Official portrait, 2024

Minister of State for Trade
- In office 29 June 2007 – 3 October 2008
- Prime Minister: Gordon Brown
- Preceded by: Ian McCartney
- Succeeded by: Gareth Thomas

Member of the House of Lords
- Lord Temporal
- Life peerage 10 July 2007 – 31 August 2020

Personal details
- Born: Digby Marritt Jones; 28 October 1955 (age 70) Birmingham, Warwickshire, England
- Party: Crossbench
- Spouse: Patricia Jones
- Education: University College London
- Profession: Businessman
- Website: www.digbylordjones.com

Digby Marritt Jones, Baron Jones of Birmingham, (born 28 October 1955) is a British businessman and politician who served as Director General of the Confederation of British Industry (CBI) from 2000 to 2006, and Minister of State for Trade from 2007 to 2008. He sat in the House of Lords as a non-aligned active crossbencher until 2020.

== Career ==
=== Education and business career ===
Jones was born on 28 October 1955 in Birmingham, England. He was educated at Bromsgrove School where he was Head Boy. From 1974 until 1977, Jones read law at University College London on a Royal Navy University Cadetship as a Sub-Lieutenant, graduating with upper second class honours. After graduation, Jones worked for 20 years at Edge & Ellison, a firm of lawyers based in Birmingham, culminating in serving as Senior Partner from 1995 to 1998.

Jones was Chairman of the West Midlands Regional Council of the Confederation of British Industry (CBI), and became the first serving regional chairman to be appointed CBI's Director-General, serving from 1 January 2000 to 30 June 2006. He was appointed a Knight Bachelor in the 2005 New Year Honours for services to Business. He then acted as an adviser to Barclays Capital, Ford Motor Company, Deloitte and JCB. In November 2006, Jones was appointed "Business Adviser" to the Duke of York, receiving £1,000 a month from the royal payroll for working one day a month. This position ended upon his appointment as a Minister in July 2007.

Jones was a non-executive director for the IT contractor iSOFT from 2000 until his resignation in July 2005, when he stayed on for one year as an adviser.

=== Government appointments and peerage ===
Jones served as the unpaid UK Skills Envoy from 2006 to 2007, before taking up the role of Minister of State for Trade 29 June 2007. The post was situated in both the newly created Department for Business, Enterprise and Regulatory Reform and the Foreign and Commonwealth Office. He was appointed as a minister in a move to create a government of all the talents. As he was not a parliamentarian at the time, Jones was made a life peer, and became a member of the House of Lords. It was suggested that he was taking the Labour whip in the House of Lords, but he chose not to join the Labour Party. He was gazetted as a peer on 10 July 2007 as Baron Jones of Birmingham, of Alvechurch and of Bromsgrove in the County of Worcestershire, and took his seat in the House of Lords that same day.

Jones had considered running for Mayor of London after being encouraged by a group of prominent businessmen. He was also approached by the Conservative Party about becoming its candidate, but rejected this idea.

In April 2008, Jones announced his intention to resign as Minister of State for Trade later in the year. He resigned in October 2008 and was appointed to be a UK Business Ambassador for Trade and Investment. In testimony to the Public Administration Committee he said that his time as a junior minister was "one of the most dehumanising and depersonalising experiences" anyone could have and that he had been amazed by how many civil servants he thought deserved the sack. He was, however, positive about the decision to appoint Peter Mandelson as Secretary of State for Business, Enterprise and Regulatory Reform in the October 2008 reshuffle.

=== Subsequent political career and retirement ===
Jones sat as a crossbencher until retiring from the House of Lords on 31 August 2020.

On 20 September 2013, Jones spoke at the UK Independence Party conference in London as a guest speaker, addressing the conference on business and economic matters.

On 29 September 2014, it was rumoured that Jones might defect to the Conservative Party after he introduced the Chancellor of the Exchequer, George Osborne, before his keynote speech at the Conservative Party conference in Birmingham. He said that Osborne "deserves a personal pat on the back" for having "stuck to your guns and did what was right for our country." In response to any rumour regarding a possible defection, Jones stated: "I don't do party politics" and "business is my constituency."

In March 2020, Jones moved permanently to Guernsey, serving as Chairman of the Guernsey Policy & Economics Group.

== Political views ==
=== Trade unions ===
In 2006, Jones said of trade unions: "They are in danger of withering on the vine of irrelevance. They are backward looking and not on today's agenda. The trade unions put their members first and not the country. Labour is always in thrall to the unions. People keep banging on about cash for peerages, but the unions have bunged money to the government for years."

=== Brexit ===
In July 2016, shortly after the Brexit referendum, Jones argued that the process of exiting the European Union would have minimal impact on the economy and employment, stating: "There's not going to be any economic pain. If there are job losses, they will be very few." According to The New European, he later contradicted this statement, declaring in January 2019 that he had "made it very clear in every speech I gave we would be economically worse off."

== Media ==
Jones was the guest on BBC Radio's Desert Island Discs, broadcast on 21 May 2006. He won BBC One's Celebrity Mastermind with a 9-point margin finishing on 33 points on 5 January 2011. Jones nominated Winston Churchill on BBC Radio 4 Great Lives.

He presented the BBC Two programme The New Troubleshooter where he "helps businesses realise their potential, ruffling feathers and bruising egos along the way as he gets stuck in and delivers his analysis and advice", taking over the mantle of John Harvey-Jones who presented the original series Troubleshooter.

In July 2014 he presented a programme on BBC Radio 4, The Business Covenant.

In 2020 presented a programme looking at how businesses are getting ready for Brexit on Times Radio.

=== Books ===
In 2011 Jones published his first book, Fixing Britain: The Business of Reshaping Our Nation (Wiley), which was shortlisted for the 2012 CMI Management Book of the Year.

In 2017 Fixing Business: Making Profitable Business Work for the Good of All, was published in April 2017, also with Wiley.

== Honours and interests ==
Jones has honorary fellowships from Cardiff University, University College London and Cardiff Metropolitan University; and a number of honorary doctorates from various UK universities.

While an active peer, Jones registered his outside interests with the UK parliament. This consisted of a number of chairmanships, paid speaking engagements, shareholdings, and directorships, and positions as an advisor.

== Personal life ==
Jones and his wife, Pat, live in Guernsey.

Jones is a supporter of Leicester Tigers (officially Leicester Football Club), Aston Villa FC and a member of the Reform Club. Jones is also Patron of the Triumph Owners' Motorcycle Club.

Business positions
Preceded by Adair Turner	Director of the Confederation of British Industry; 2000–2006	Succeeded by Richard Lambert
Political offices
Preceded by Ian McCartney	Minister of State for Trade; 2007–2008	Succeeded by Gareth Thomas
Orders of precedence in the United Kingdom
Preceded by The Lord West of Spithead	Gentlemen; Baron Jones of Birmingham	Followed by The Lord Darzi of Denham
