= Richard Lambert =

British journalist and business executive

Sir Richard Lambert
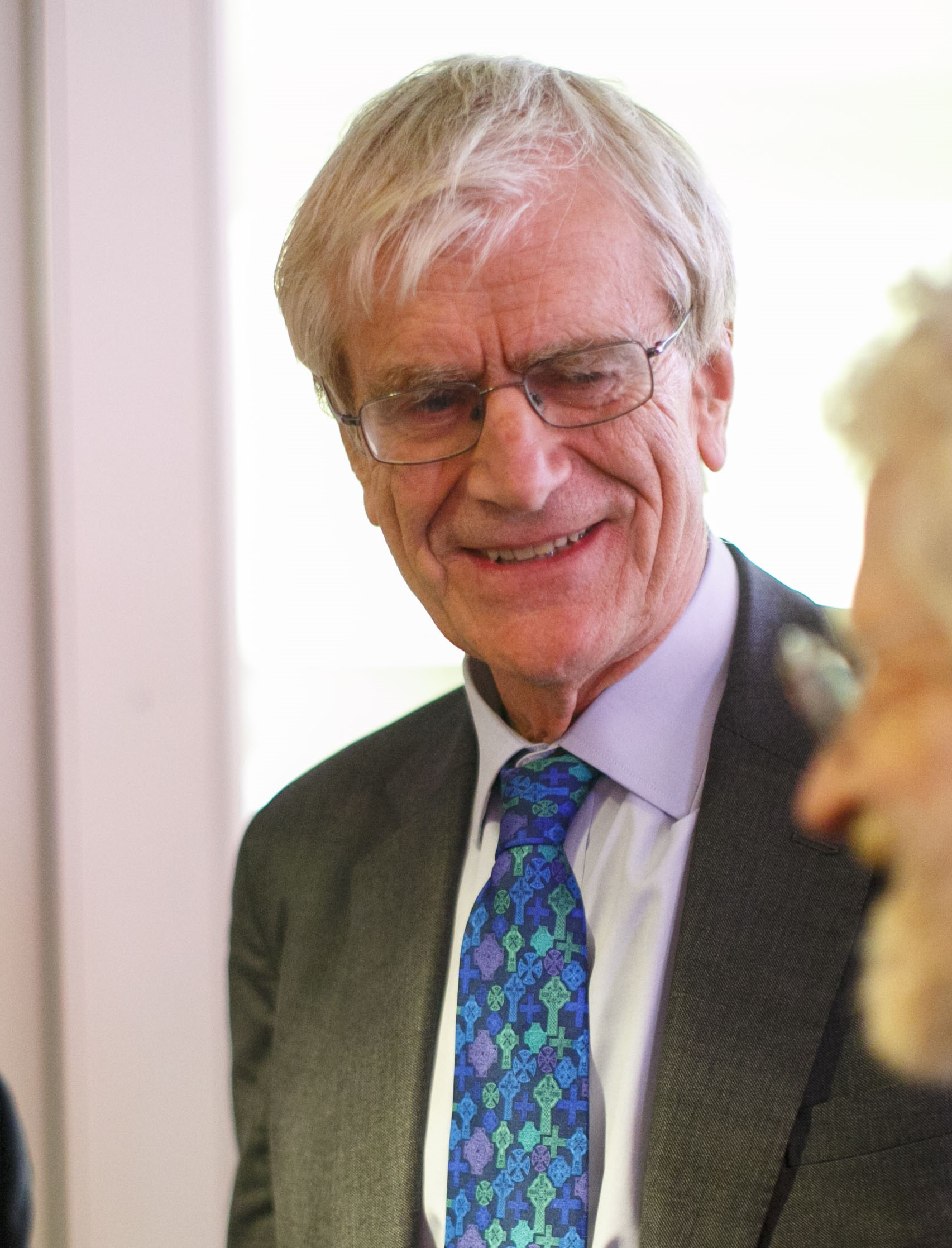
- Lambert at the FT economists' Christmas drinks reception, 2015
- Born: 23 September 1944 (age 82); Buckinghamshire, England
- Education: Fettes College
- Alma mater: Balliol College, Oxford
- Title: Former director-general of the CBI; Former chancellor of the University of Warwick; Former editor of the Financial Times; Former chairman of the British Museum; Former chairman of Bloomsbury Publishing Plc
- Spouse: Harriet Murray-Browne (m. 1973)
- Children: 2

Sir Richard Peter Lambert (born 23 September 1944) is a British journalist and business executive. He served as director-general of the CBI, chancellor of the University of Warwick, editor of the Financial Times newspaper, chairman of the board of the British Museum and chairman of Bloomsbury Publishing Plc.

== Early life and education ==
Lambert was born in north Buckinghamshire and grew up in Manchester, first attending a local grammar school, before, at the age of 13, going to Fettes College, an independent school for boys in Edinburgh, followed by Balliol College at the University of Oxford, where he studied history.

== Business career ==
He joined the Financial Times in 1966, editing the Lex Column in the paper in the 1970s. He became financial editor in 1979. From 1982 to 1983, he was the paper's New York correspondent. He was editor of the FT from 1991 to 2001. From 1997 to 1998, he returned in New York and remained editor, where he set up a US version of the paper to challenge the Wall Street Journal.

From June 2003 to March 2006, he was one of the nine members of the Monetary Policy Committee of the Bank of England, which sets the interest rate for the British pound.

=== CBI ===
He became director-general of the Confederation of British Industry on 1 July 2006. He wrote Government reports on BBC News 24 and chaired the Lambert Review on the relationship between higher education and business.

He was replaced by John Cridland as head of the CBI on 1 February 2011.

== Honours ==
He was awarded an honorary doctorate from the University of York in 2007. He has other honorary degrees from City University, the University of Warwick, Brighton University and the University of Exeter.

He was appointed chancellor of the University of Warwick on 19 March 2008. He formally took up the position on 1 August 2008, and was officially installed on 10 December of the same year. After eight years as chancellor, Lambert concluded his term at the end of the 2015–16 academic year and was succeeded by Catherine Ashton.

He was knighted in the 2011 New Year Honours for service to business.

== Ownership claims over the Parthenon Marbles ==
Lambert took up the controversial role of chair of the board of the British Museum in 2014, a role described in an article published in his former newspaper the Financial Times as "a ceremonial role that mostly involves raising money and refusing to give the Greeks back the Elgin Marbles".

The position of the British Museum is that the Elgin Marbles are owned by the Museum trustees. This position is disputed both by the Greek government and within Britain, where polls indicate that a majority of the British public support the repatriation of the Marbles to Athens. Lambert complained of not having received sufficient advanced notice from Egyptian novelist Ahdaf Soueif, who resigned from the board of trustees, citing its connection with "corporate sponsorship" and its failure to repatriate artifacts such as the Elgin Marbles.

In response to the controversy surrounding the ownership of the Elgin Marbles, including instances of the marbles being accidentally damaged by schoolboys and by unsuccessful whitening attempts, Lambert wrote an article in The Guardian claiming that the marbles should remain in the Museum. This came about after the controversy intensified in Britain, in part thanks to British Labour Party politician Jeremy Corbyn, who suggested that he would approve of repatriating the Marbles to Greece. Polls conducted by the British government indicate the majority of the British public support the repatriation of the Marbles to Greece.

Lambert stood down from his role at the British Museum in October 2021 and was replaced by George Osborne.

== Personal life ==
He married Harriet Murray-Browne in 1973 and has two children.

Media offices
Preceded by Geoffrey Owen	Editor of The Financial Times; 1991–2001	Succeeded by Andrew Gowers
Business positions
Preceded by Sir Digby Jones	Director of the Confederation of British Industry; 2006–2011	Succeeded by John Cridland
Preceded by Niall FitzGerald	Chairman of the British Museum; 2014–2021	Succeeded by George Osborne
Academic offices
Preceded by Nick Scheele	Chancellor of the University of Warwick; 2008–2016	Succeeded by The Baroness Ashton of Upholland
