= Tony Danker =

British business executive (born 1971)

- Born: 30 December 1971 (age 54); Belfast, Northern Ireland
- Education: University of Manchester; Harvard University
- Title: Former director-general, Confederation of British Industry
- Term: November 2020 - March 2023
- Predecessor: Carolyn Fairbairn
- Children: 2 sons

Tony Danker (born 30 December 1971) is a British lobbyist and former Director-General of the Confederation of British Industry (CBI) from November 2020 to March 2023.

== Early life ==
Danker was born in Belfast, Northern Ireland, on 30 December 1971. He was educated at Belfast Royal Academy, and the University of Manchester where he earned a law degree.

Danker was chair of the Union of Jewish Students from 1993 to 1994.

He studied for a Master of Public Administration degree at Harvard University, which he completed in 2005.

== Career ==
After leaving the University of Manchester, he worked for the former Chief Rabbi, the late Lord Sacks, from 1994 to 1996. From 1998 to 2008, he was a consultant at McKinsey. From 2008 to 2010, during the Brown Ministry, he was a SPAD at HM Treasury. From 2010 to 2017, he was international director, then chief strategy officer, at Guardian News and Media, which publishes The Guardian and The Observer.

From 2017 to 2020, he was chief executive of Be the Business, a government and industry-funded body launched by George Osborne aiming to make British companies more productive. In June 2020, it was announced that he would be the next director general of the Confederation of British Industry (CBI): he succeeded Carolyn Fairbairn in November 2020.

In 2023, Danker stepped aside after accusations arose of inappropriate workplace conduct involving a female employee earlier in the year. The CBI announced that it would be independently investigating the accusations.

On 11 April 2023, the CBI announced that Danker had been dismissed with immediate effect as his conduct had "fallen short of that expected of the director general". Danker said that had been made "the fall guy" for a wider crisis at the organisation. In January 2024 it was announced that the CBI had settled on undisclosed terms an action for wrongful dismissal brought against it by Danker.

== Views ==
In November 2022, Danker said higher growth was needed and otherwise the UK would not afford the growing health and social care costs. Danker said Hunt's statement had been "all about fighting inflation and getting the government budget in some decent shape and that does need to be done. There was really nothing there that tells us the economy is going to avoid another decade of low productivity and low growth".

== Personal life ==
Danker is married, with two sons, and lives in London.

Business positions
Preceded by Carolyn Fairbairn	Director-General of the Confederation of British Industry; 2020–2023	Succeeded by Rain Newton-Smith
