= Confederation of British Industry =

UK business organisation

CBI – Confederation of British Industry
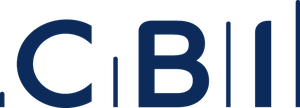
- Abbreviation: CBI
- Formation: 1965; 61 years ago
- Legal status: Non-profit organisation created by royal charter
- Purpose: British industry
- Location: Cannon Street, London, EC4
- Region served: United Kingdom
- Chair: Cressida Hogg
- CEO: Rain Newton-Smith
- Main organ: CBI Council
- Website: www.cbi.org.uk

The Confederation of British Industry (CBI) is a British business interest group, which says it represents 190,000 businesses. The CBI has been described by the Financial Times as "Britain's biggest business lobby group". Incorporated by royal charter, its mission is to promote the conditions in which businesses of all sizes and sectors in the UK can compete and prosper for the benefit of all. In 2023, the association was shaken by numerous accusations of sexual misconduct in the organisation.

== Membership ==
The CBI's membership includes companies from the FTSE 100, mid-caps, SMEs, privately owned businesses, trade associations, universities and other public bodies. The CBI has members in many sectors: agriculture, automotive, aerospace, construction, creative, education, financial services, IT, manufacturing, professional services, retail, transport, tourism and utilities.

The CBI is made up of around 1,500 direct members and 188,500 indirect members. The indirect members are represented through 140 trade associations within the confederation, for whose memberships the CBI also asserts representation, after the model of business confederations in many European countries, like Germany. Indirect members feed into the CBI's policy formulation through their Trade Association. The National Farmers' Union, with 55,000 members, is the largest component of the 188,500 non-members the CBI says it represents. The Country Land and Business Association brings another 30,000 non-members, the Freight Transport Association 13,000, the Federation of Master Builders 9,500, the Road Haulage Association 8,100 and the National Federation of Builders 1,400.

== Role ==
The CBI works to promote business interests by lobbying and advising governments, networking with other businesses and creating intelligence through analysis of government policies and compilation of statistics, both in the United Kingdom and internationally through their offices in Beijing, Brussels, New Delhi and Washington, D.C.

The organisation is non-partisan and has sought legal advice to ensure neutrality.

== Structure ==
The most recent Director-General was Tony Danker, who assumed the role on 30 November 2020, but had to step aside after misconduct allegations in March 2023, with Matthew Fell being appointed on an interim basis. Danker's dismissal was announced on 11 April 2023. His successor is Rain Newton-Smith, previously chief economist at the CBI.

The CBI is governed by its royal charter and by the CBI Council, which is able to delegate many of its roles to the Chairs' Committee and Board. Final policy positions are mandated by the CBI Chairs' Committee, which has a seat for all of the chairs of its regional and national councils and subject-based policy standing committees, SME Council and Trade Association Council. The Chairs' Committee meets following each Standing Committee and Regional Council round.

The CBI's strategic and financial decisions are decided on by the CBI Board, which is chaired by the CBI President and includes the support and guidance of 4 other non-executives. Day-to-day management of the CBI is in the hands of the Director-General supported by a Management Board, made up of a number of CBI directors.

A President's Committee, made up of members, advises the president. The president, with the approval of the Chairs' Committee (under its delegated powers), appoints the director-general, who is responsible for the management of the CBI.

It has offices based in every region of the UK, including teams in Scotland, Northern Ireland and Wales, along with offices in Washington D.C, New Delhi, Beijing and Brussels.

In September 2023, the CBI confirmed it was holding talks with Make UK about working together that could include a possible merger.

== History ==
The organisation was formed in 1965 out of a merger of the Federation of British Industries (known as FBI), the British Employers' Confederation and the National Association of British Manufacturers.

The CBI opened an office in Brussels in 1971, to open up opportunities in Europe. Other international offices have opened in Washington (2002), Beijing (2005) and New Delhi (2011).

In March 2014 it moved its headquarters from Centre Point, London, to offices in Cannon Place, located above Cannon Street railway station in the City of London.

=== Sexual misconduct scandal ===
In March 2023, The Guardian reported on a sexual harassment complaint made against CBI director-general Tony Danker with additional allegations by other staff members. The CBI started an independent investigation, and Danker was replaced as head of the CBI by Matthew Fell, the organisation's UK policy director, on an interim basis. In January 2024 it was announced that the CBI had settled on undisclosed terms an action for wrongful dismissal brought against it by Danker.

On 3 April 2023, The Guardian published a report with more than a dozen current and recent women employees of CBI alleging to have been victims of sexual misconduct, including one rape, independent of the previously reported Danker allegations. CBI expanded its investigation to include the new allegations and cancelled all future events, including its annual dinner.

On 11 April 2023, the business group appointed its former Chief Economist Rain Newton-Smith as its new Director General, one month after she had left the CBI to join Barclays.

On 21 April 2023, the Guardian reported that a second woman has said she was raped by CBI colleagues. On the same day, a number of major UK companies terminated their memberships with the CBI including Arup, Aviva, Phoenix Group, John Lewis, Mastercard, Virgin Media O2, Zurich Insurance Group, Ernst & Young, NatWest, WPP plc, and BMW. Other major members of the CBI, including Barclays, HSBC, TSB, Lloyds Banking Group, Asda, Meta, Uber, PwC and many more announced they were pausing activities with the CBI pending the outcome of the investigation. The CBI has appointed law firm Fox Williams to conduct an independent investigation into the allegations. The group has suspended three employees pending the outcome of an investigation by Fox Williams.

In May 2023, the CBI announced that it had appointed Principia Advisory to assist it to "identify the root causes of past failure, and recommend the changes required for cultural renewal and rebuilding trust". The CBI conducted a poll asking its members the question: "Do the changes we have made − and the commitments we have set out − to reform our governance, culture, and purpose give you the confidence you need to support the CBI?" The result, announced on 6 June 2023, was that 93% of its members voted in favour of continuing to support the organisation; however it later became known that turnout was only 28%, so fewer than a third of members voted in support.

In September 2023, it was reported that the CBI was seeking around £3 million from its members within days of its Annual General Meeting in order to avoid 'financial oblivion'. On 20 September the organisation's AGM was meant to be held. It was announced the day prior that this would be postponed until further notice.

In September 2023, it was reported that the UK Chancellor of the Exchequer, Jeremy Hunt, had agreed to hold face-to-face talks with Rain Newton Smith ahead of the Chancellor's Autumn Statement, set to be held in November. This news came five months after the Chancellor had claimed there was 'no point' in engaging with the CBI following its recent scandals.

In March 2024, The Guardian reported that the CBI had used gagging clauses (non-disclosure agreements, NDAs) to prevent staff from discussing their sexual misconduct and bullying experiences at the organisation. The NDAs were accompanied by substantial financial settlements, with the total bill approaching £1m. The exodus of fee-paying members had made CBI's financial situation precarious, forced it to lay off one-third of its 300 staff in a year.

Rupert Soames took up the position as the CBI's new President in early 2024.

== Research ==
The CBI conducts numerous surveys that are of particular use to its members and stakeholders. Research is available to the relevant sections of its membership. The CBI's surveys are currently:

- Industrial Trends
- Distributive Trends
- Service Sector
- Financial Sector
- SME Trends
- Investment Intentions

Occasional surveys include:

- Procurement
- London Business
- Education and Skills
- Absence
- Employment Trends

CBI policy is decided through consultation with its members – companies from all sectors and sizes of business across the UK are directly involved in the policy-making process. The CBI publishes numerous reports each year on a wide range of issues that of interest and relevance to its members. Recent campaigns include "Future Champions", promoting the contribution and role of mid-sized businesses, "Industrial Futures", looking at how government should intervene in the economy to promote growth, and a report on the need to strengthen UK supply chains published in 2014.

The CBI publishes Business Voice, a monthly magazine for its membership and 'Intelligence FIRST', an occasional publication providing strategic guidance for members on regulatory and economic change.

== The Great Business Debate ==
In September 2014, the CBI started The Great Business Debate campaign aimed at increasing public confidence in business. Survey data found that only around 50% of people in the UK think that business contributes positively to society and the campaign was initiated to play a part in increasing that figure. A website and social media channels have been set up to openly promote the contribution business makes whilst enabling people and organisations to give their opinions on this. It is planned that various events and other occurrences will take place across the UK as part of the campaign.

== Organisation ==
=== Senior personnel ===
- Cressida Hogg, Chair
- Peter Hogg, Senior Council Chair
- Brian McBride, Non-Executive Director (former President)
- Rain Newton-Smith, CEO

=== List of former directors-general ===
1. John Davies (30 July 1965 – 15 October 1969)
2. Sir Campbell Adamson (15 October 1969 – 2 July 1976)
3. Sir John Methven (2 July 1976 – 23 April 1980) died in office
4. Sir Terence Beckett (1 October 1980 – 26 March 1987)
5. Sir John Banham (26 March 1987 – 26 June 1992)
6. Sir Howard Davies, (29 June 1992 – 31 December 1995)
7. Adair Turner (1 January 1995 – 31 December 2000)
8. Sir Digby Jones (1 January 2001 – 30 June 2006)
9. Sir Richard Lambert (1 July 2006 – 30 January 2011)
10. John Cridland (31 January 2011 – October 2015)
11. Dame Carolyn Fairbairn (1 November 2015 – 6 December 2020)
12. Tony Danker (30 November 2020 – 11 April 2023)

== See also ==
- British Chambers of Commerce
- Federation of Small Businesses
