= Mikołaj Dowgielewicz =

Polish politician (born 1972)

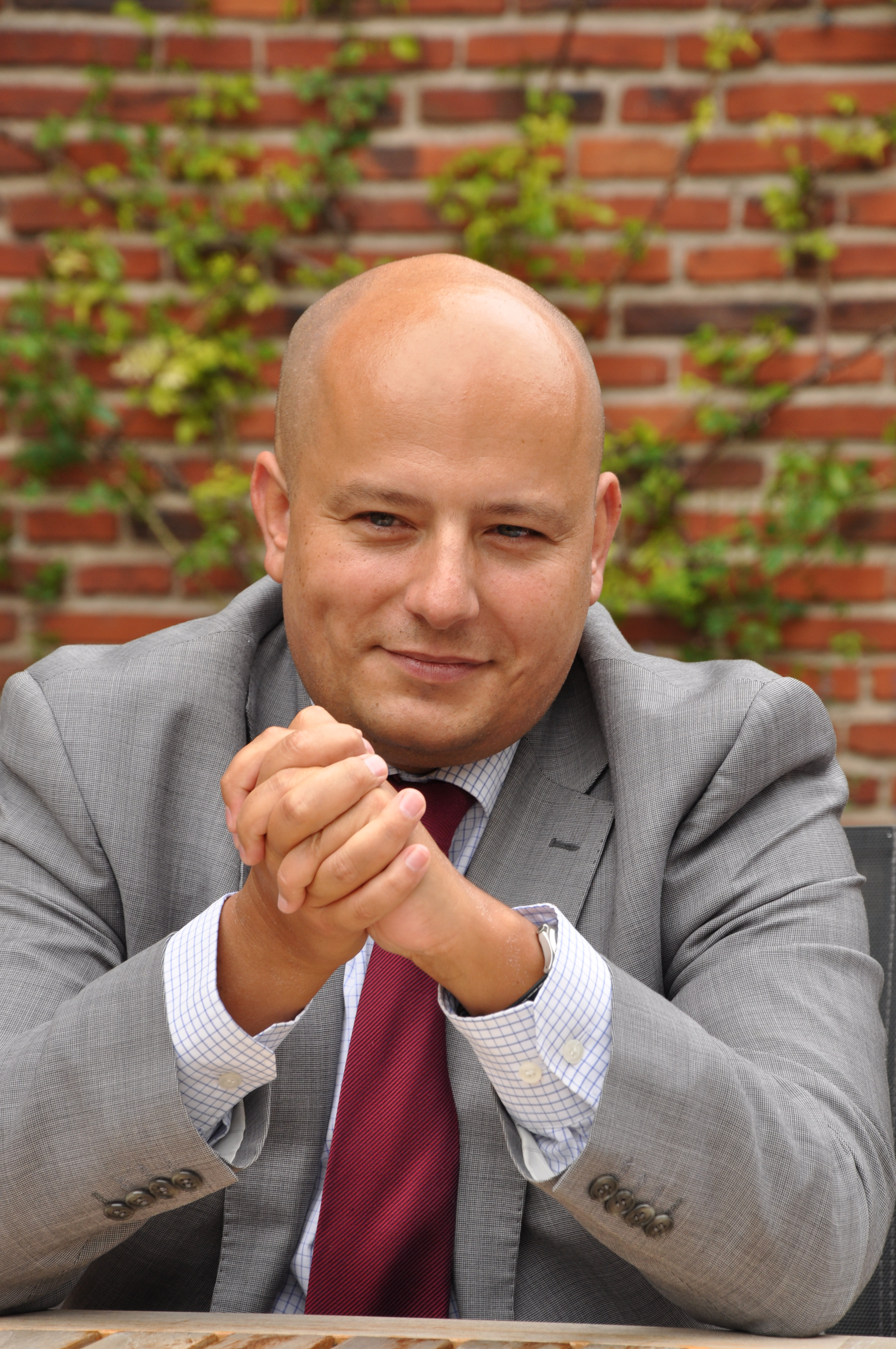
Mikołaj Dowgielewicz

Mikołaj Marek Dowgielewicz (born 23 October 1972 in Gorzów Wielkopolski) was Polish Minister for European Affairs in 2007–2012. Currently working at European Investment Bank as the Director General and Permanent Representative.
