= Rain Newton-Smith =

British business executive

- Born: June 1975 (age 51)
- Education: University of Oxford; London School of Economics
- Occupations: Director General, Confederation of British Industry
- Term: April 2023 – present
- Predecessor: Tony Danker
- Children: 4
- Parent: William Newton-Smith

Rain Newton-Smith (born 1975) is the director general of the Confederation of British Industry (CBI) after being appointed in April 2023. She was the CBI's chief economist from August 2014 to March 2023.

== Early life ==
Rain Newton-Smith is the daughter of Canadian-born Oxford philosopher William Newton-Smith (1943–2023) and his first wife, the children's author Dorris Heffron. Heffron's 1982 book about two teenage girls growing up in Toronto was titled 'Rain And I' [sic].

Newton-Smith earned a degree in Philosophy, Politics and Economics (PPE) from the University of Oxford, and an MSc in economics from the London School of Economics (LSE).

== Career ==
Newton-Smith spent nine years at the Bank of England where she prepared global forecast reports for the central bank's rate-setting committee. She went on to lead the emerging markets division at the Oxford Economics consultancy specialising in the Chinese economy. Newton-Smith previously held a position advising the UK executive director at the International Monetary Fund.

Newton-Smith was previously chief economist of the CBI, where she served from August 2014 until March 2023. In that role, The Guardian described her as a "vocal commentator on the struggles faced by businesses after the pandemic".

She left the CBI in March 2023 and took up a post at Barclays as a managing director to lead the bank's environmental, social, and corporate governance policy. After the dismissal of Tony Danker in early April 2023 following complaints of misconduct, Newton-Smith was appointed as the CBI's new Director General.

== Personal life ==
Rain Newton-Smith is married with four daughters and lives in Eynsham, West Oxfordshire; her husband was elected district councillor for their ward in 2021.

Business positions
Preceded by Tony Danker	Director-General of the Confederation of British Industry; 2023–present	Incumbent
