= William Munro Tapp =

English solicitor (1859–1936)

William Munro Tapp (1859–1936) was an English solicitor and company director. He is known also as a geologist, antiquarian and collector. He was a benefactor of Gonville and Caius College, Cambridge, and a donor giving to the British Museum, Fitzwilliam Museum and Victoria & Albert Museum.

== Life ==
He was born in London on 6 April 1859, the fourth son of Arthur March Tapp, an accountant working for the Brassey company. He was educated at the Forest School, Snaresbrook.

In 1877 Tapp matriculated at Caius College, Cambridge, graduating B.A. in 1881. In 1884 he graduated LL.M. and was qualified as a solicitor. In 1891 he was with the firm Goren & Tapp of 27 South Molton Street, London. He graduated LL.D. in 1893. He retired from career activity as a solicitor around 1906; for the rest of his life he was involved in the administration of family trusts.

Tapp was also a businessman. He became vice-chairman of the Manbré Sugar Company. For them he travelled to Kenya, and was involved in the purchase there of land for sugar cane and coffee plantations. He acted as a director of at least eight companies.

During World War I, Tapp served with the St John Ambulance Corps, in the Ypres Salient. In October 1914 he crossed the English Channel to Dunkirk, in his converted Wolseley car. It had a custom ambulance body.

== Benefactor ==
=== Gonville and Caius College ===
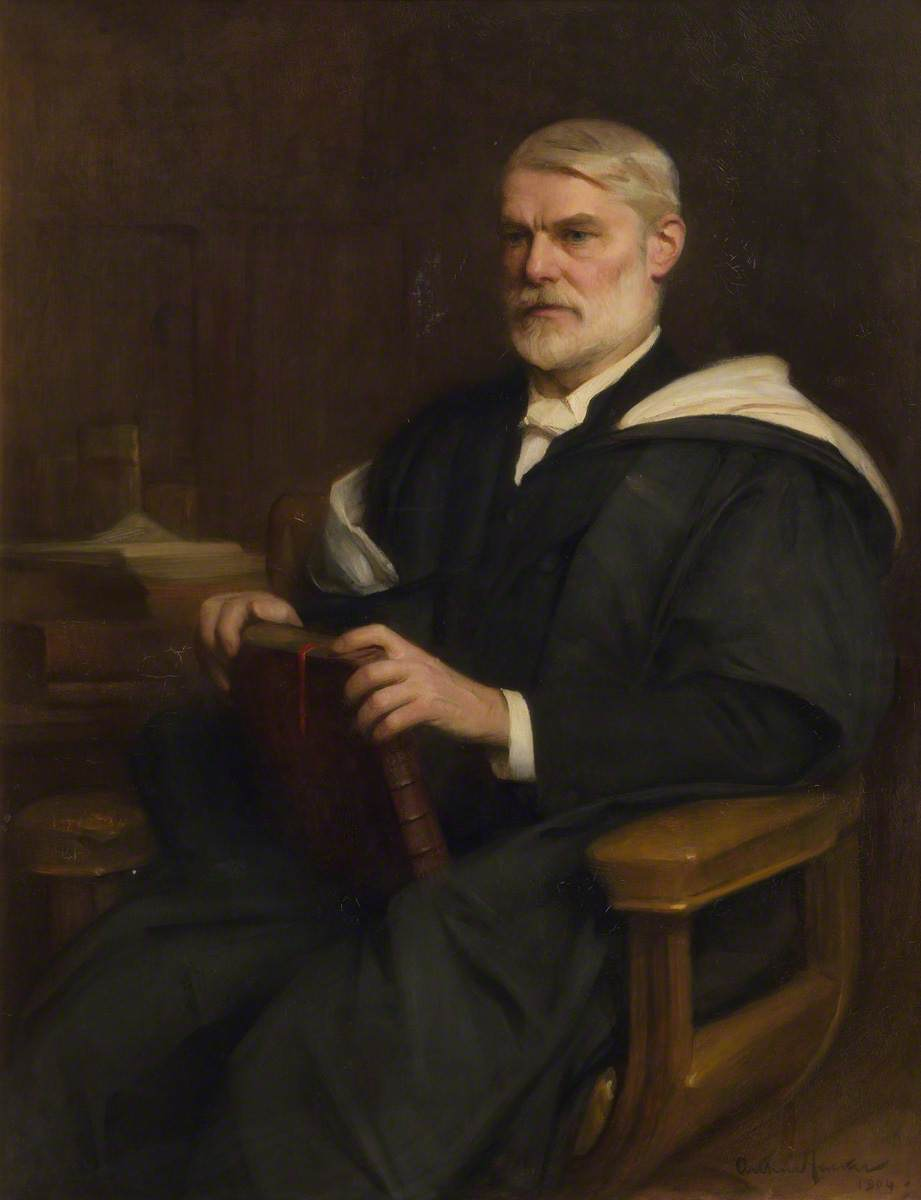
Ernest Stewart Roberts, portrait by Arthur Hacker, presented to Gonville and Caius College by W. M. Tapp

Tapp during his lifetime gave to Caius College portraits of Ernest Stewart Roberts, William Ridgeway and John Forbes Cameron. On his death he gave the college money, half of which was to support the study of law; the college being Tapp's residual legatee. The college first elected Tapp research fellowships by an open process in 1956.

=== Museum donations ===
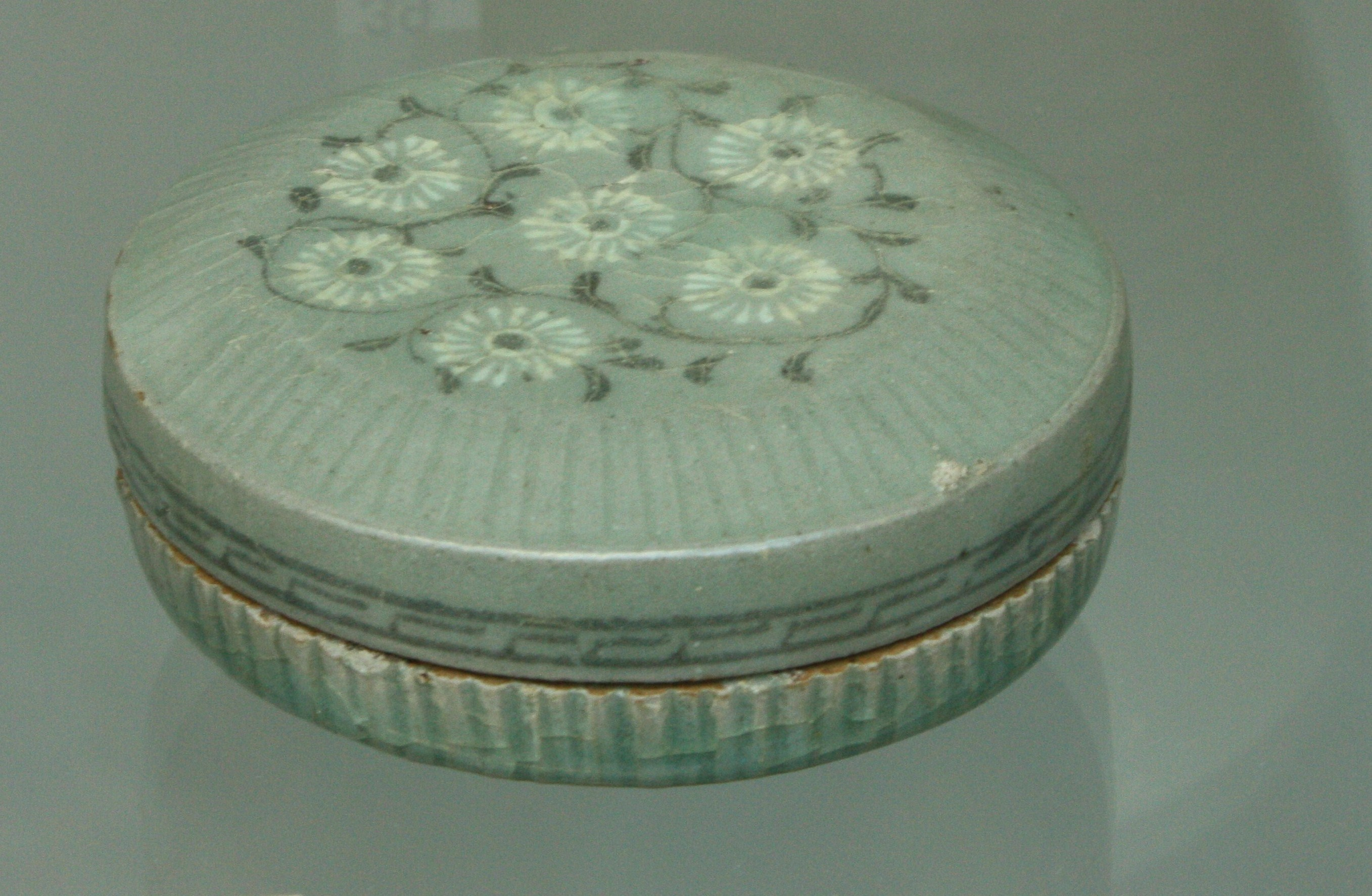
Celadon ceramic box from Goryeo, 12/13th centuries, donation by Tapp to the Victoria and Albert Museum

Tapp travelled in Korea at the beginning of the period of Japanese rule that started in 1910. He subsequently made donations of Korean ceramics to British museums: the Victoria and Albert Museum, the British Museum and the Fitzwilliam Museum. He gave the Fitzwilliam Museum its first Korean ceramics in 1920, and proceeded with donations there and to the Victoria and Albert Museum for the rest of his life. He also donated to the Museum of Archaeology and Anthropology, University of Cambridge. That donation included a collection by Charles Hartley.

== Works ==
Tapp translated in English a work by Zacharie Le Rouzic as The Megalithic Monuments of Carnac and Locmariaquer; their purpose and age (1908).

== Learned societies ==
Tapp was elected to the Royal Institution in 1898. He was a Fellow of the Society of Antiquaries of London, elected 1906, and was elected a Fellow of the Geological Society in 1924.

== Family ==
Tapp married in 1887 Kate Garrett Grimwood of Boxmoor, daughter of the late George Augustus Grimwood of Shern Hall (1826–1883); her mother was Betsey Maria Garrett (born 1835), daughter of Richard Garrett III (1807–1866) and niece of Newson Garrett.

=== Grimwood family background ===
The brewery Garrett, Whitaker, Grimwood & Co., later trading as the Camden Brewery, was set up in Camden Town in 1849, or 1859 by Richard Garrett, George Augustus Grimwood of Leiston and others. George Grimwood and Betsey Garrett were married in 1856, when the Norfolk News gave her father as "Mr. R. Garrett, of London, and Leiston Works, Saxmundham."

George Augustus Grimwood was a merchant, in later life at Walthamstow, as was his son George Augustus Grimwood II (born 1866), an importer, of Upton Lodge, Bushey. The younger George's partnership in the Foreign Fruit and Produce Company was dissolved in 1905. The soldier and accountant James Grimwood (1873–1934), who also attended the Forest School, was Kate Garrett Grimwood's brother. Her elder sister Elizabeth Rose Grimwood married in 1896, at Tarn Taran, as his second wife, the missionary Edward Guilford (1853–1937). In 1895, when Bessie M. Grimwood, sixth daughter of George and Betsey, made a first cousin marriage to Percy Nathusius Garrett of Buenos Aires, son of John Dunnell Garrett, Betsey was living at Beacon Hill, Woodbridge, Suffolk.
