= Apple Newton-Smith =

Canadian judge

Provincial Court Judge, Ontario Court of Justice
- In office March 13, 2019 – April 30, 2024
- Appointed by: Caroline Mulroney

Judge of the Ontario Superior Court of Justice
- Incumbent
- Assumed office May 1, 2024
- Appointed by: Arif Virani

Apple Newton-Smith is a Canadian judge and former criminal defense lawyer. She was called to the bar in 1999. Newton-Smith was appointed as a provincial court judge effective March 13, 2019. She was appointed a judge of the Ontario Superior Court of Justice on May 1, 2024.
