= Jonathan Goodwin (entrepreneur) =

British banker and investor (born 1972)

Jonathan Goodwin OBE
- Born: November 1972 (age 53)
- Education: Charterhouse; University of Nottingham
- Occupation: Merchant banker
- Known for: Alvarium Investments, Founders Forum, Founders Pledge
- Political party: Conservative
- Spouse: Hon. Flora Hesketh
- Children: 6
- Relatives: Alexander Fermor-Hesketh, 3rd Baron Hesketh (father-in-law)

Alvarium Investments
- Type: Independent merchant bank
- Founded: 2009
- Headquarters: Mayfair, London
- Area served: Global
- Number of employees: 200

Jonathan Philip Pryce Goodwin OBE (born November 1972) is a British banker and investor. He is partner, head of Merchant Banking at Alvarium Investments. His appointment followed the merger in March 2019 of Lepe Partners, the merchant bank he co-founded in 2011, with Alvarium which works across North America, Europe and Asia Pacific, supervising $15bn+ of assets. With Brent Hoberman, Goodwin also co-founded Founders Forum, a network of digital entrepreneurs, corporate CEOs and senior investors.

Goodwin is treasurer of the Centre for Policy Studies and a member of the Advisory Board on Planning and Development at the Victoria and Albert Museum. He is a former head of the investment pillar of the British Fashion Council.

He has advised on more than 200 media deals, together worth over $20 billion. They include Chris Evans' purchase of Virgin Radio, the sale of Friends Reunited to ITV, the sale of Who Wants To Be A Millionaire and the merger of property websites Findaproperty.com, Primelocation.com and Zoopla. Recent M&A advisory projects include News Corps' £220m purchase of Wireless Group plc.

He was appointed an Officer of the Order of the British Empire (OBE) in the 2018 New Year Honours for services to the economy.

== Early career ==
After graduating from the University of Nottingham, Goodwin worked briefly at Coopers and Lybrand, where for one assignment he was asked to compile two reports. One report was to be on a "fascinating" proposed deal in the media sector, the other involved research into car component manufacturers; at that moment Goodwin realised he would "prefer castration" to car parts: "Every deal I've worked on has been in and around the media sector since then", he told The Daily Telegraph in 2012.

Goodwin then spent a year at private equity group Apax Partners, before leaving to join a News Corporation/Liberty Media-backed buyout of Talk Radio UK in 1997. He was appointed managing director of Talk Radio. UK, which went on to become the foundation for The Wireless Group PLC, for which Goodwin was Group managing director under Kelvin Mackenzie.

In 2000 Goodwin and Julian Culhane co-founded LongAcre Partners, a corporate finance boutique. LongAcre worked with Elisabeth Murdoch, helping to build her TV production business Shine via a series of acquisitions. LongAcre was also involved in the £175m sale of Friends Reunited to ITV. LongAcre's investors included the law firm Olswang and private equity house Corsair. In 2007 LongAcre was sold to US investment bank Jefferies. Goodwin remained at Jeffries as head of Global Technology, Media and Telecommunications until 2010.

== Lepe Partners ==
In 2011 Goodwin and Culhane co-founded Lepe Partners, a merchant bank focused on the media internet and technology sectors. The company was named after a hamlet and beach in Hampshire where Goodwin spends his weekends.

In addition to its advisory work, Lepe operated a venture growth fund which provided capital and strategic support to late stage venture growth opportunities in industry verticals. The fund was structured as a pledge fund based on annual commitments. Its portfolio included: Pharmacy2U, Boat International Media, CreativeLive, Masabi, and Festicket. The fund exited its investment in Wahanda (now Treatwell) in 2015, following a sale of the business to Recruit Holding. Lepe also advised on investment deals for News Corp, Ministry of Sound and TalkTalk.

In 2019 Lepe Partners merged with Alvarium.

== Founders Forum ==
In 2006 Goodwin and Hoberman created Founders Forum, a network for digital entrepreneurs, corporate CEOs and senior investors. The Forum has 1500 members and has become known as a Europe-based equivalent of Sun Valley, the Allen & Co retreat for media executives in the US. Speakers and attendees at previous Forum meetings include Sir Richard Branson, Arianna Huffington, Eric Schmidt, Reid Hoffman, Sean Parker, Niklas Zennstrom, Mikitani Hiroshi, Ben Horowitz, Natalie Massenet, Charles Dunstone, Tony Fadell, Natalie Vodianova, Jessica Alba, Peter Gabriel, Ashton Kutcher, Jeffrey Katzenberg, Daniel Ek and Ari Emanuel.

Events are held in London, Paris, Madrid, Istanbul, Los Angeles, New York City, Rio de Janeiro, Mumbai, New Delhi, Qingdao and Singapore. In 2013 the Financial Times announced a media partnership with the Forum, presenting two awards at that year's London event.

Also in 2013, Founders Forum and the British Government's UK Trade & Investment arm created the Technology Innovators' Forum (TIF-IN), which connects new UK businesses with influential heads of content, media and finance companies worldwide.

In 2009 Goodwin, Hoberman and other partners co-founded PROfounders Capital, an early stage fund backed by entrepreneurs for digital entrepreneurs. One of its first investments was UK-based TweetDeck, the online application sold two years later to Twitter for $40m.

Founders Forum has launched a number of initiatives under the Founders aegis, including the executive search arm Founders Keepers and the strategic consultancy Founders Intelligence.

== Philanthropy ==
=== Founders Pledge ===
In June 2015 Goodwin co-launched Founders Pledge, a UK- and US-registered charity to enable tech entrepreneurs to commit to donating at least 2% of their personal proceeds to philanthropic causes upon exit.^{[1]} Founders Pledge's declared mission is to "strip down the barriers to charitable giving, making it easy for technology entrepreneurs to give back to society." The Pledge's service is paid for by sponsors, partners, and private donors, and is offered free to entrepreneurs. Founders Pledge also offers post-exit support, including charity sourcing, due diligence and impact reporting.

At launch, £18.5m was pledged by leaders of 50 UK technology companies, including Alex Depledge of Hassle.com, José Neves of Farfetch, Ben Medlock from SwiftKey and James Alexander of Zopa. Founder's Pledge has facilitated the giving of $15.5 million to charities of donors' choices and has secured a further $180 million in legally binding pledges.

In March 2016 Founders Pledge launched Founders of the Future, a philanthropic initiative that uses artificial intelligence and recommendations to uncover entrepreneurial talent in the 15–35 age group who are not currently founders.

Founders Pledge has also entered partnerships with US seed accelerators MassChallenge and Y Combinator, to obtain pledges from their funded companies.

== Personal life ==
Goodwin is married to Flora Hesketh, the daughter of Alexander Fermor-Hesketh, 3rd Baron Hesketh, the former Conservative Party treasurer.

Goodwin's hobbies include sailing. In 2012 he campaigned the J/109 Harlequin, becoming the overall winner at Cowes Week 2012 for both the White Group, J/109 group, and Cowes Week overall.

== Awards and recognition ==
- The Financial Times has described Goodwin as "...one of London's best-connected media dealmakers."
- Has been featured in GQ Magazine's 100 Most Connected Men 2014
- Has been featured in the 2014 Wired 100 list of Europe's top digital influencers.
