= Evening Telegraph (Dundee) =

Daily tabloid newspaper based in Dundee

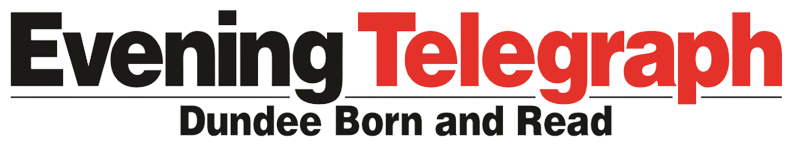
- Type: Evening newspaper
- Format: Tabloid
- Owner: DC Thomson
- Founder: John Leng
- Publisher: DC Thomson
- Editor: David Clegg
- Founded: 13 March 1877; 149 years ago (as Dundee Evening Telegraph)
- Political alignment: Right-wing populist
- Language: English
- Headquarters: Dundee, Scotland
- Country: United Kingdom
- Circulation: 4,060 (as of June 2026)
- Website: Official website

The Evening Telegraph is a local newspaper in Dundee, Scotland. Known locally as the Tele (usually pronounced Tully or Tilly), it is the sister paper of The Courier, also published by Dundee firm DC Thomson. It was founded in 1877. David Clegg serves as the editor of both the Evening Telegraph and The Courier in a joint role.

== History ==
Originally founded by John Leng in 1877 as "The Evening Telegraph", it became Dundee's flagship local newspaper. Its first editor was William Fisher and originally was liberal and reformist in its editorial style. The first issue released on 13 March 1877. DC Thomson acquired the Evening Telegraph in 1905 where it began to adopt its current conservative and populist editorial style after it was acquired by DC Thomson.

In the 1920s, the Evening Telegraph was renamed to as "Evening Telegraph and Post", the paper would continue to be printed under this title up until the 1980s when it was renamed to just the "Evening Telegraph" and is still printed under this title to this day.

By the 1950s, the Evening Telegraph became very popular with readers with seven editions of the newspaper being printed in a day.

In 2011, the Evening Telegraph had an extensive rebrand and by 2016, DC Thomson launched the "Weekend Telegraph" which is published each Saturday.

In 2021, the Evening Telegraph's website was amalgamated into a new website at The Courier following a restructure which focused on DC Thomson creating more online content as a result in the decline of newspaper sales.

== Featured content ==
The Evening Telegraph features news and stories from Dundee and the local area and also has focus on national and international issues. It has columnists and guest columnists who feature in the "Opinion" section which also includes their "Your Voice" page where readers can give their responses to the stories featured in the paper.
