= Genes Reunited =

Genealogy website

- Company type: Limited Company
- Industry: genealogy, online publishing
- Founded: 2003
- Headquarters: London, United Kingdom
- Owner: DC Thomson
- Number of employees: 100
- Website: www.genesreunited.co.uk

Genes Reunited, originally known as Genes Connected, is a genealogy website that was launched in the UK in 2003 as a sister-site to Friends Reunited. It has over 13 million members and over 780 million names listed.

== History ==
Steve and Julie Pankhurst, the creators of Friends Reunited originally formed Genes Connected in 2003 as a sister-site to Friends Reunited, It was later rebranded as Genes Reunited and was sold to ITV in 2005. Genes Reunited was part of the group that was sold to Brightsolid in 2009.

It is now one of the family history brands, including Findmypast, that are owned by DC Thomson

== Features ==
Members are able to build their family tree by posting it on the site and investigating which ancestors they share with other members. Online community boards give members the opportunity to chat and share advice. They can also upload and share family photos and documents. Each name added to a family tree is given a profile where all information can be stored.

A subset of records from the parent company Findmypast can be accessed, on a pay-as-you-go basis, or by subscription. They can also search historical records, such as census records from England, Wales and Scotland and birth, marriage and death records dating from 1837 to 2006.
