= David Couper Thomson =

Scottish media proprietor and founder of DC Thomson (1861–1954)

David Couper Thomson DL (6 August 1861 – 12 October 1954) was a newspaper proprietor and founder of the newspaper and publishing company D. C. Thomson & Co. Ltd in Dundee, Scotland.

== Early life ==
Thomson was raised in Newport-on-Tay, Fife, by his mother, Margaret Couper, and his father, William Thomson (18 June 1817 – 9 October 1896), who was a successful draper and later a shipowner and, in 1884, became the major shareholder of the Dundee Courier & Daily Argus. Thomson was sent to the family shipping business in Glasgow and in 1886, at his father's request, Thomson moved back to Dundee to become the general manager of the newspaper. The other son, Frederick Thomson (10 April 1864 – 4 September 1917), joined the company in 1888.

== Career ==
DC Thomson was founded with £60,000 capital. William, David and Frederick had all but four of the company shares which were valued at £10 per share. Each wife had an allocation of one share; the remaining share belonged to Frances Thomas Mudie.

When Frederick died in 1917, Thomson became the sole proprietor of the company. Between 1920 and 1922, he actively campaigned using vitriolic rhetoric against one of the two M.P.s for Dundee, then Liberal politician Winston Churchill. At one meeting, Churchill was able to speak for only 40 minutes when he was barracked by a section of the audience. At the General Election of 1922 both of the local newspapers owned by Thomson, the Liberal supporting Dundee Advertiser and the Conservative inclined Courier, advised their readers to reject Churchill. Subsequently, Churchill came only fourth in the poll and lost his seat at Dundee to prohibitionist, Edwin Scrymgeour, quipping later that he left Dundee "without an office, without a seat, without a party and without an appendix". Thomson barred Churchill's name from his newspapers until World War II made occasional use of it unavoidable.

During the General Strike of 1926, most employees of his publishing concern were members of National Society of Operative Printers and Assistants (NATSOPA). David Coupar Thomson was outraged by the strike and the effect it had on his business. Earlier in 1926, his company took over the rival company John Leng & Co. which produced the Dundee Advertiser. The strike coincided with the merger. After the strike, NATSOPA members were allowed to return provided the members signed a document to say that they had left the union and tender an apology. In March 1952, a strike was caused when a man who had worked for the company since 1921 was discovered to have secretly joined NATSOPA in 1939.

Although Thomson was less involved with the company after 1933, he remained chairman of the company until his death, aged 93, in 1954; but it was his nephew William Harold Thomson who drove the expansion of its publishing interests, particularly in the field of comics. The Sunday Post, launched in 1914, introduced a "Fun" section in 1936 which became home to iconic cartoon characters such as Oor Wullie and The Broons. The Dandy – which included Desperate Dan – first appeared in the following year, and The Beano eight months later, offering a free "Whoopee Mask" with its first issue.

== Personal life ==
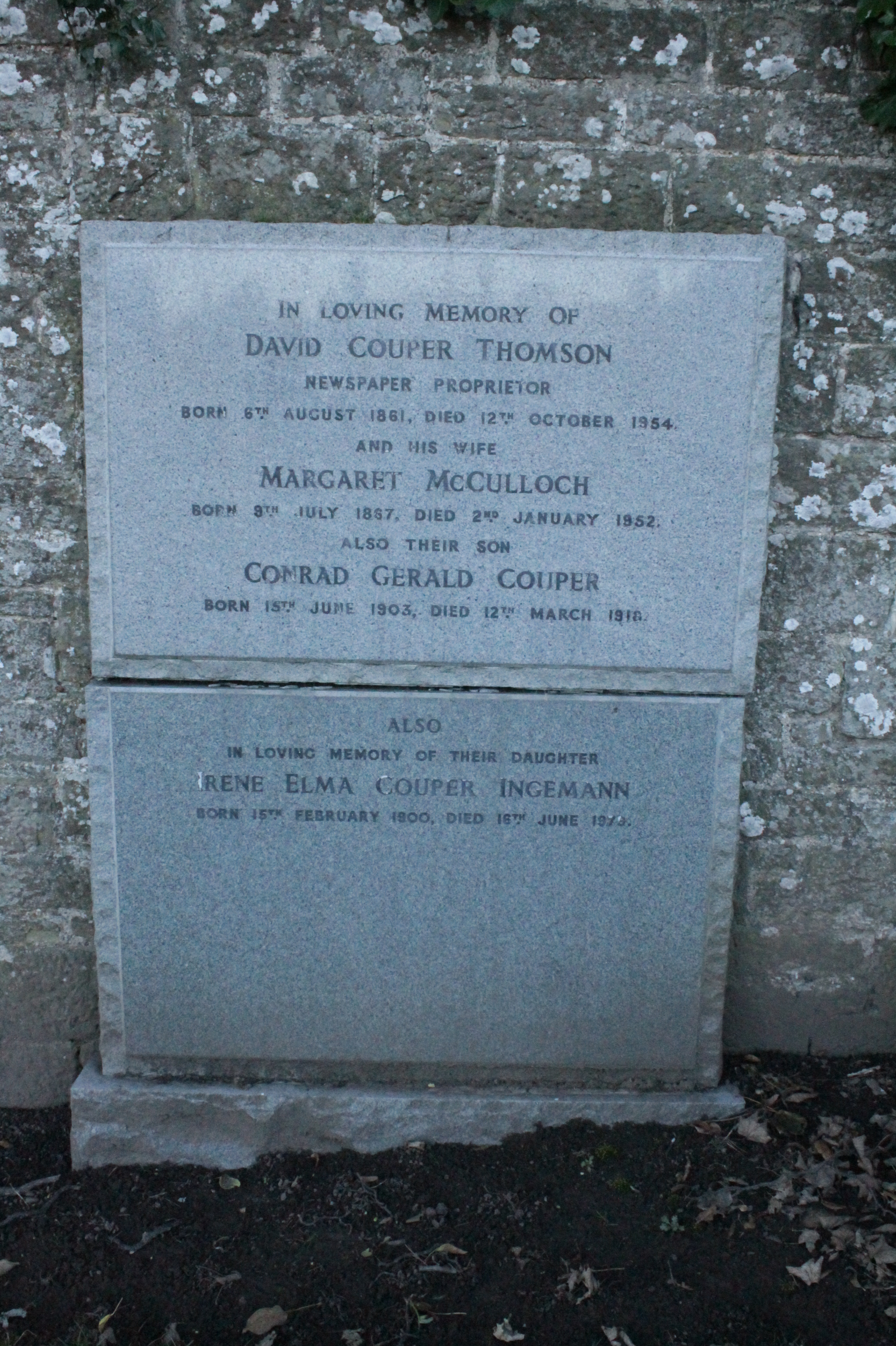
The grave of D C Thomson, Western Cemetery, Dundee

D.C. Thomson married Margaret McCulloch (1867–1952) and had three daughters, Mona Agnes Couper Thomson (1895-1967), Lilian Margaret Couper Thomson (1897–1955), Irene Elma Couper Ingemann Thomson (1900–1979), and a son, Conrad Gerald Couper (1903–1918).

David was deputy lieutenant of Dundee for 50 years, governor of University College, Dundee for nearly 60 years, and was also an active member of Dundee Chamber of Commerce and Dundee Eye Institute.

He died on 12 October 1954 and is buried in the Western Cemetery, Dundee. The grave lies against the western wall flanked by his shipowner forebears.

His brother, the shipowner William Thomson (1 January 1860 – 10 March 1925) married Clara Beatrice Leng, daughter of the publisher Sir John Leng.

His brother Frederick Thomson (1864–1917) was a shipowner and newspaper proprietor, running the Dundee Courier. David took on this role after Frederick's death.

== See also ==
- List of DC Thomson Publications
- British comics
