= Jules Coleman (CTO) =

Irish entrepreneur

Jules Coleman is an Irish coder entrepreneur.

== Education ==
Coleman graduated from the University College Dublin in 2006 with a Bachelor of Science degree in economics and finance.

== Career ==
Coleman started her career in the field of management consulting. In May 2005 she was appointed analyst in IBM Ireland's finance department. The following year she became an analyst with Accenture in their Finance and Performance Management team. From March 2008 to April 2010 she was a consultant within Accenture where she supported a global oil company in the redesign of their order to cash process in conjunction with the roll-out of SAP. During that same period she worked with a pharmaceutical company developing a method to realise a world-wide multi-million pound Working capital savings. She then started working at PWC in London from April 2010 to December 2011 where she started as a manager and ended as a Senior Manager.

In November 2011 she co-founded Hassle.com, a domestic cleaning services platform and company, together with Alex Depledge, and Tom Nimmo. In December 2016 she co-founded Resi (formerly BuildPath), the UK's first online residential architectural platform. On the platform, she and her team produce design concepts, support planning applications, and connect consumers with professionals.

When interviewed by The Irish Times in May 2018, she declared "If starting a business is likely to jeopardise everything, you might want to think long and hard as to whether to do it or not. But if you can make things relatively safe and feel like you’ll always regret it if you don’t give it a try, then you really should go for it."

She has participated in media broadcasting programs like "Girls Can Code" on BBC Three and The Bottom Line on BBC Radio 4.

== Awards ==
Forbes included Coleman in their The World's and Europe's Top 50 Women in Tech 2018 list.

- Internet Hero, The Spiders - The Digital Technology Awards (2016)
- TechWomen 50 Award (2017)
- Women in Tech Award (2018)
