= DC Thomson =

Scottish publishing and television production company

D.C. Thomson & Company Limited
- Logo used since 2011

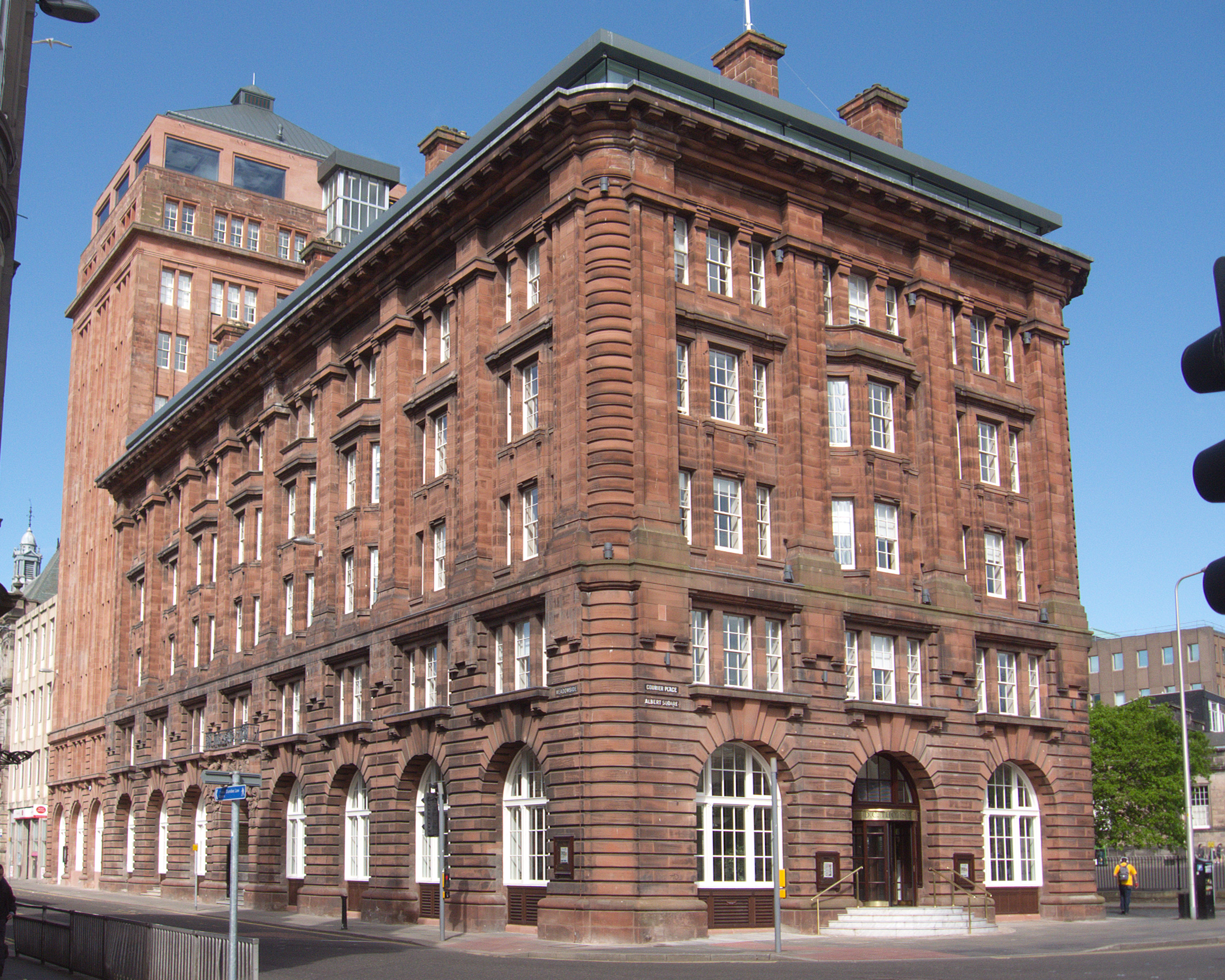
- Dundee headquarters at Meadowside
- Type: Private
- Industry: Publishing
- Founded: 1905; 121 years ago
- Founder: David Couper Thomson
- Headquarters: Dundee, Scotland, UK
- Key people: Christopher HW Thomson (Chairman); David Thomson (Director & COO); Richard Hall (Director)
- Products: Sunday Post; The Evening Telegraph; My Weekly; Jackie; Shout; The Beano; The Dandy; Commando; See also: List of D. C. Thomson & Co. Ltd publications
- Revenue: ▲£245 million (2016)
- Operating income: ▲£30.06 million (2016)
- Total assets: ▼£1.404 billion (2016)
- Number of employees: ▲2,148 (2016)
- Subsidiaries: DC Thomson Media; DC Thomson Ventures; Brightsolid, Findmypast; Beano Studios; Emanata Studios; Shortlist Media; Puzzler Media; Wild & Wolf; Pure Radio Scotland; Fifth Ring
- Website: dcthomson.co.uk

D.C. Thomson & Company Limited (trading as DC Thomson) is a media company based in Dundee, Scotland. Founded by David Couper Thomson in 1905, it is best known for publishing The Courier, The Evening Telegraph and The Sunday Post newspapers, and the comics Oor Wullie, The Broons, The Beano, The Dandy and Commando. It also owns the Aberdeen Journals Group which publishes the Press and Journal. The company owns several websites, including Findmypast, and owned the now defunct social media site Friends Reunited.

== History ==
The company began as a branch of the Thomson family business when William Thomson became the sole proprietor of Charles Alexander & Company, publishers of Dundee Courier and Daily Argus. In 1884, David Couper Thomson took over the publishing business, and established it as D.C. Thomson in 1905. The firm flourished, and took its place as the third J in the "Three Js", the traditional summary of Dundee industry ("jute, jam and journalism").

Thomson was notable for his conservatism, vigorously opposing the introduction of trade unions into his workforce, and for refusing to employ Catholics. Among historians of popular culture, the firm has "excited a good deal of interest precisely because it has always shrouded its activities in secrecy ... [it] has never allowed scholars access to its archives, and has declined to participate in exhibitions of juvenile literature."

By 2010, the company was producing more than 100 million comics, magazines, and newspapers every year from offices in Dundee, Glasgow, Manchester, and London. In June 2010, 350 jobs at DC Thomson were made redundant with the closure of the West Ward Printworks in Dundee, along with a section of the Kingsway Print Plant.

Although the principal offices are now located outside Dundee city centre at Kingsway, the Courier Building at Meadowside has been retained as the company headquarters. This 1902 building was designed to resemble an American red stone, steel reinforced office block. When a nine-storey tower extension was added in 1960, the architect T. Lindsay Gray kept the same style. The building underwent extensive renovation and reopened to employees in 2017, and is able to accommodate 600 workers.

In 2009 DC Thomson acquired the magazine company This England Publishing, which included This England magazine and Evergreen quarterly magazine. In the same year DC Thomson acquired the Friends Reunited website from ITV for £25.6m, but by 2011 it was valued at £5.2m and was eventually shut down completely in February 2016. In 2013, DC Thomson laid off 46 production staff at its Lang Stracht base in Aberdeen after printing was moved to Dundee.

As of 2016, the company posted an increase in pre-tax profits and revenue whilst employing over 2,000 workers. Despite the falling circulation of newspapers and magazines, DC Thomson attributed the rising profits to company-wide cuts to operating costs and good figures in digital revenues and events. The company went on to say that they would continue to branch out their brand into new areas to support the traditional newspaper and magazine divisions.

In February 2023, it was announced that several "well-loved" titles would be closed and employees would be made redundant as part of a wider restructuring. On 9 February 2023, it was announced that Shout, Living, Platinum Magazine, Evergreen, Animals & You and Animal Planet would be closed with 300 employees being made redundant. In January 2024, the company announced plans to eliminate 55 jobs and shutter four titles: This England, My Weekly Pocket Novels, 110% Gaming and Unicorn Universe.

== Subsidiaries ==
=== Current ===
==== Brightsolid ====
Brightsolid is a data centre and cloud-based hosting company based in Dundee that DC Thomson established in 1995 as Scotland Online. It became Brightsolid in 2008, organised into two divisions: Brightsolid Online Publishing (BSOP) and Brightsolid Online Technology (BSOT). The two divisions were split into separate businesses in October 2013, and Brightsolid Online Publishing was renamed DC Thomson Family History, with Annelies van den Belt as chief executive.

==== Findmypast ====
Findmypast Limited (formerly DC Thomson Family History, until 2015) owns a variety of large genealogy sites worldwide, including Findmypast, Genes Reunited and Mocavo. The company had contracts to digitise archives for the Imperial War Museum and the British Library, where it was making the British Newspaper Archive searchable.

=== Former ===
==== Pure Radio ====
In October 2019, DC Thomson Media announced Pure Radio, a new station aimed at central Scotland. It featured former Heart Scotland presenters Robin Galloway, Lynne Hoggan and Paul Harper, and launched on 27 November.

Pure Radio announced its closure on 12 September 2023 with Galloway stating that the station "didn’t quite reach the listener numbers and revenue that we'd expected". Its frequencies for Dundee and Perth were reused for a localised version of Original 106.

==== Other ====
- The Thomson-Leng Musical Society was formed in 1964, originally to provide entertainment for the workers of DC Thomson. The musical society celebrated its 60th anniversary in 2024.
- Friends Reunited, owned by DC Thomson from its purchase by them in 2009 until its closure in 2016
- Peter Haddock, a Bridlington-based children's publisher was owned by DC Thomson until they closed it in late 2013.

== Publications ==
D.C. Thomson publications include:

- Sunday Post
- The Courier
- The Evening Telegraph
- My Weekly
- The Scots Magazine
- The People's Friend
- The Beano
- The Dandy
- Commando
- Jackie
- Shout
- Bunty

== Gallery ==
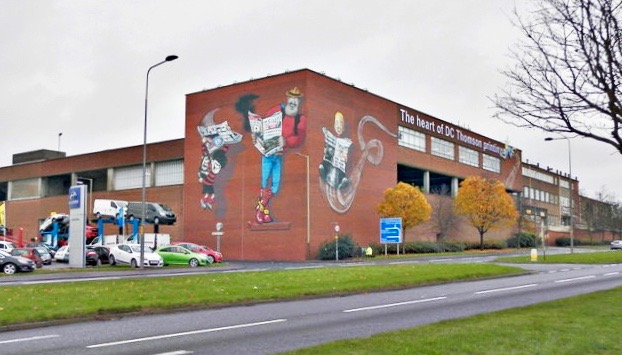
DC Thomson printing offices on the Kingsway

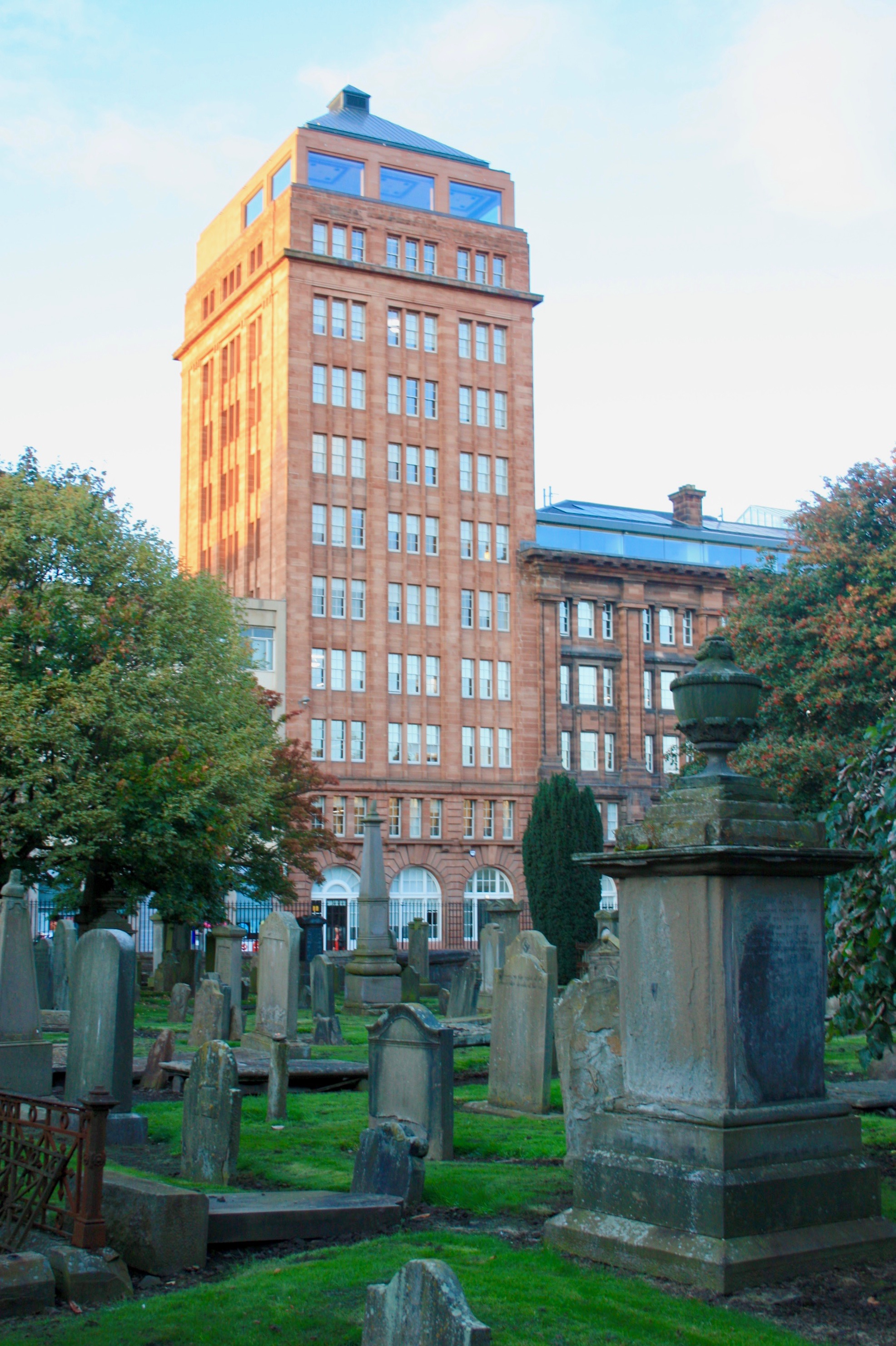
DC Thomson's tower extension from The Howff

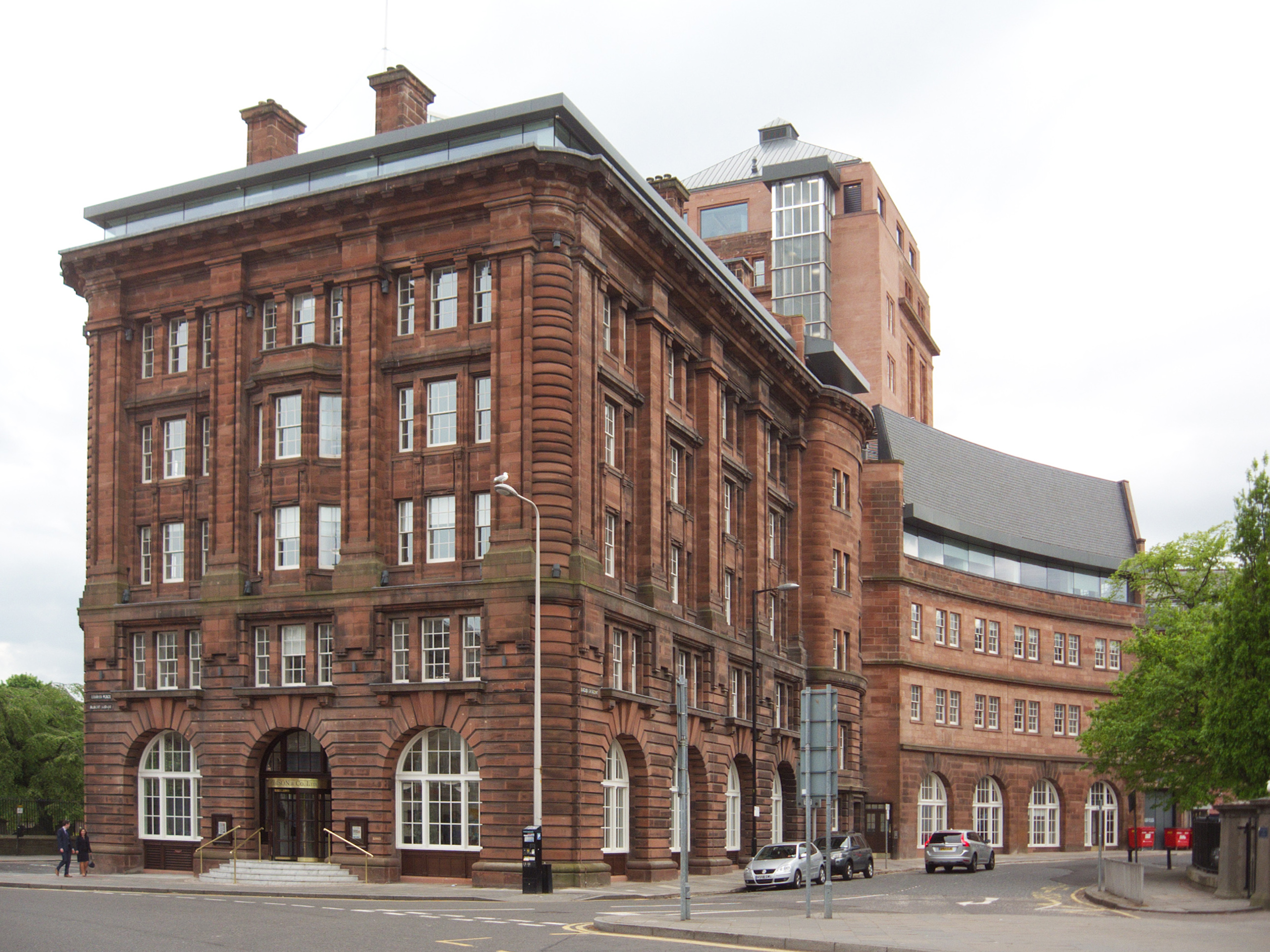
Meadowside offices from another angle

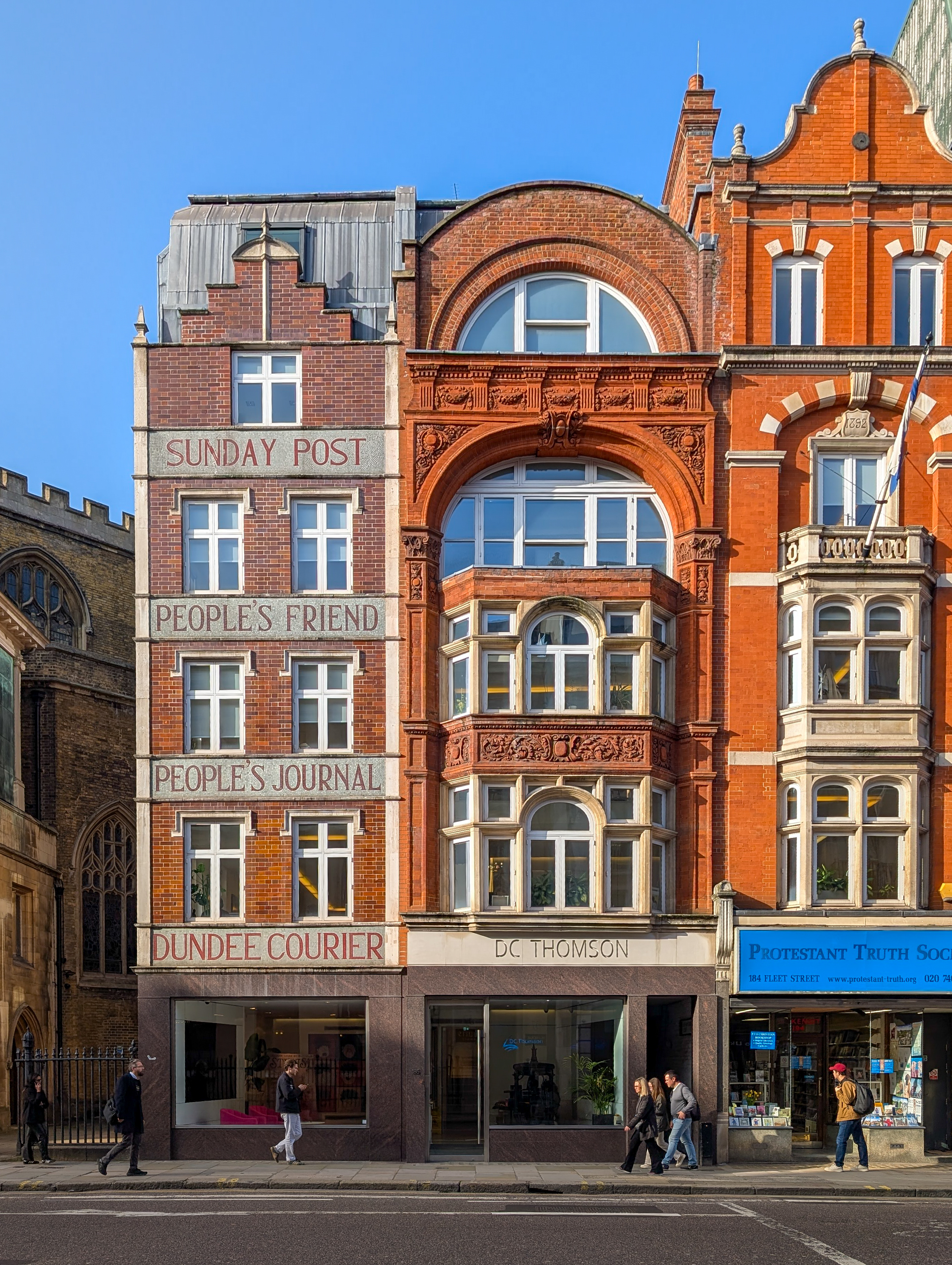
DC Thomson London offices on Fleet Street

== See also ==
- British comics
- Ellis Watson
