= Advertiser-funded programming =

Advertiser-funded programming (AFP) is a recent term applied to a break away from the modern model of television funding in place since the early 1960s. Since that time, programmes have normally been funded by a broadcaster and they re-couped the money through selling advertising space around the content. This has worked fine for decades, but new technological advances have forced broadcasters and advertisers to re-think their relationship.

The concept is as old as television itself; the term soap opera is derived from the fact that the original soap operas were in fact funded and produced by soap companies such as Procter & Gamble. Shows such as the Texaco Star Theater, which were among the earliest television programs, included the practice. It was not until the quiz show scandals of the late 1950s, when particularly aggressive advertisers began rigging game shows to produce a more entertaining product, that the practice fell on the wayside. By the time television became a worldwide phenomenon in the late 1950s and early 1960s, the original model had mostly been eschewed in favor of the modern model, which separates programming and advertising. (The fact that many of the early television broadcasters outside the United States were public broadcasters that restricted the use of advertising may have been a contributing factor to this.)

With the advent of digital recording devices, also known as personal video recorders (PVR's), viewers can choose to record episodes or entire series of their favourite shows and watch them in their own time. Not only does this skew the idea of 'primetime', (advertisers being charged a premium for buying spots around the most popular viewing times), but it means viewers can skip the ads altogether.

Advertiser-funded programming, largely a neologism, is a solution to this change and means the advertiser pays to integrate their message in the TV programme itself, rather than just buying advertising space around it. It includes product placement, sponsorship, naming rights and more recently the actual creation of whole shows from scratch. Many of these projects are enabled by a content partnership where the programming is co-funded by multiple stakeholders.

Some recent examples of AFP:

- The Krypton Factor, in partnership with The Sage Group on ITV
- Beat: Life on the Street on ITV, in partnership with the Home Office
- Ford and Toyota in 24
- Crest toothpaste in The Apprentice
- American Express in The Restaurant
- Findmypast.co.uk sponsored the genealogy TV series Find My Past on the Yesterday channel in October 2011.

Most sports organizations heavily restrict the use of advertiser funded programming, particularly amateur competitions such as the Olympic Games and the FIFA World Cup, both of which ban the practice as ambush marketing. Other sports have embraced the practice as an additional form of revenue, both for the leagues and the networks. Naming rights have been sold for bowl games, tournaments, television presentations, halftime shows, stadiums and arenas, with the practice of selling team names more common outside North America, while product placements and advertisements can be seen on the fields, on sideboards surrounding them, or as on-screen graphics without interrupting a telecast. Advertiser funded programming techniques give sports broadcasters a third channel of revenue, in addition to retransmission consent fees and traditional advertising, allowing stations such as ESPN to pay high rights fees and still make significant amounts of money.
