= Friends Reunited =

Portfolio of social networking websites

- Website type: Social networking service
- Available in: English
- Owner: DC Thomson
- Website: friendsreunited.co.uk
- Commercial: Yes
- Registration: Optional
- Users: 23.8 million (2010)
- Launched: 30 June 2000; 26 years ago
- Current status: Shut down as of 26 February 2016

Friends Reunited was a portfolio of social networking websites based upon the themes of reunion with research, dating and job-hunting. The first and eponymous website was created by a husband-and-wife team in the classic back-bedroom Internet start-up; it was the first online social network to achieve prominence in Britain, and it weathered the dotcom bust.

Each site worked on the principle of user-generated content through which registered users were able to post information about themselves which could be searched by other users. A double-blind email system allowed contact between users. Formerly, the site cost £7.50 per year to use but it was later free of charge.

The main Friends Reunited site aimed to reunite people who had in common a school, university, address, workplace, sports club or armed service; the sister site Genes Reunited enabled members to pool their family trees and identify common ancestors; the Dating and Jobs sister sites linked members with similar attributes, interests and/or locations.

Friends Reunited branding was attached to CD collections of nostalgic popular music, and television programmes broadcast on the ITV network, which owned the site until August 2009. A book of members' stories was published in 2003 by Virgin Books, and a song about (and named after) the site was released by The Hussys in 2006.

Following ITV's sale of the site to DC Thomson's Brightsolid subsidiary in 2009, the company relaunched Friends Reunited in March 2012 with an emphasis on nostalgia and memories.

On 26 February 2016 the website closed down, after 16 years of operation.

== History ==
=== Establishment ===
The website was conceived by Julie and Steve Pankhurst of Barnet, Hertfordshire and their friend Jason Porter in 1999. Julie Pankhurst's curiosity about the current status of old school friends inspired her to develop the website, exploiting a gap in the UK market following the success of US website Classmates.com. Friends Reunited was officially launched in June 2000. By the end of the year, it had 3,000 members, and a year later this had increased to 2.5 million.

=== ITV ownership ===
In December 2005, Friends Reunited had over 15 million members and was bought by British TV company ITV plc for £120 million ($208 million), plus further payments of up to £55 million based on its performance up to 2009.

Friends Reunited had become popular enough that its uses went beyond the intentions of its founders. According to the Register, potential employers used entries to screen job applicants. Friends Reunited has been used by bitter partners to exact revenge on those who have abandoned them and users have been sued for comments made on Friends Reunited about other people. Friends Reunited features prominently in Ben Elton's detective novel Past Mortem (2004). The website launched a series of television advertisements for the first time in early 2007.

In 2007, ITV Chairman Michael Grade described the site as "the sweet spot" of the internet and stated that "Friends Reunited is one of the great undersung jewels in the crown ... one of the most important bits of ITV going forward, a massive presence, and profitable" That year the site made a profit of £22 million, but its market valuation had fallen sharply from the £175 million paid by ITV in 2005, and it achieved growth in UK traffic of only 1.2%, compared to Facebook’s 2,393% and Bebo's 173%.

In March 2008, after losing 47% of unique users in the previous 12 months, the site dropped the subscription fee required to contact members, but the decline continued.

=== Brightsolid ownership ===
On 4 March 2009, ITV announced that it would sell Friends Reunited as part of wider restructuring and disposal of non-core assets. In August 2009 it was announced that Friends Reunited had been sold for £25 million to Brightsolid Limited, a firm owned by Dundee-based publisher DC Thomson. Following regulatory approval, the sale was completed on 25 March 2010. On 15 December 2011, DC Thomson estimated that Friends Reunited was worth only £5.2 million, a fifth of the price paid two years previously.

The site was relaunched in March 2012, with the focus shifting from reuniting with school friends to being a place where people collect and share memories.

On 1 October 2013, under the guidance of new CEO Annelies van den Belt, Brightsolid Online Publishing was rebranded as DC Thomson Family History (which, in turn, became Findmypast), focussing on its core family history brands. As a result of this, Friends Reunited was no longer considered an integral part of the direction and was to be "re-incubated elsewhere" in the DC Thomson company.

On 18 January 2016, Friends Reunited revealed that it would be closing down the website after 16 years of operation.

== See also ==
- List of social networking websites
