= Alex Depledge =

British technology entrepreneur

Alex Depledge MBE
- Born: Alexandra Depledge; Bradford, West Yorkshire, England
- Education: University of Nottingham
- Occupation: technology entrepreneur
- Known for: Hassle.com, Resi

Alexandra Depledge is a British technology entrepreneur, known best for being the founder and CEO of Resi, and as the founder and former CEO of Helpling, formerly known as Hassle.com. In 2016 she was awarded an MBE for services to the sharing economy.

== Early life and education ==
Alex Depledge was born in Bradford, West Yorkshire. She graduated from the University of Nottingham with a history and American studies degree in 2003, then moved to the US and obtained a master's degree in international relations at the University of Chicago.

== Career ==
In 2005, Depledge returned to the UK and started her career in 2006 as a consultant for Accenture in the UK. In 2012 she left Accenture to start her own venture.

=== Hassle.com ===
In 2012, Depledge and Jules Coleman co-founded Hassle.com, a London-based online platform for domestic cleaners. The business raised $6 million from Venture firm, Accel Partners, the first backers of Facebook & Spotify to scale across Europe. The company was acquired by a German company, Helpling, in 2015.

=== Resi ===
In 2017, Depledge and Coleman founded Resi (formerly known as BuildPath), an online architectural platform helping UK homeowners renovate and extend their homes. Depledge was chief executive officer until stepping down from the role in December 2025.

=== Public service and governance ===
Depledge has was a non-executive director of Persimmon Homes PLC since May 2023. In June 2025, she was appointed as the first Entrepreneurship Advisor to the Chancellor of the Exchequer.

From 2015 to 2017, Depledge was chair and director of The Coalition for a Digital Economy (Coadec). Following its rebrand as StartUp Coalition, she was a board member from June 2023 until June 2025. She was also a founding board member of the government-backed trade body Sharing Economy UK, SEUK. Depledge is on the board of the London Economic Action Partnership (LEAP), chaired by the Mayor of London.

=== Media and public commentary ===
Depledge is a regular television and radio commentator on technology, entrepreneurship, and the digital economy. In 2015, she co-presented the BBC3 programme Girls Can Code as part of the broadcaster's Thinking Digital season.

== Awards and honours ==
Depledge was appointed Member of the Order of the British Empire (MBE) in the 2016 Birthday Honours for services to the economy and has been recognised with a number of awards for her work as an entrepreneur:

- Computer Weekly – The 50 Most Influential Women in UK Tech 2017.
- Debrett's 500 - Most influential People List 2016 & 2017.
- FDM Everywoman in Technology Awards - Startup Founder of The Year 2015.
- Management Today - 35 Under 35 List 2015.
