= Thomson-Leng Musical Society =

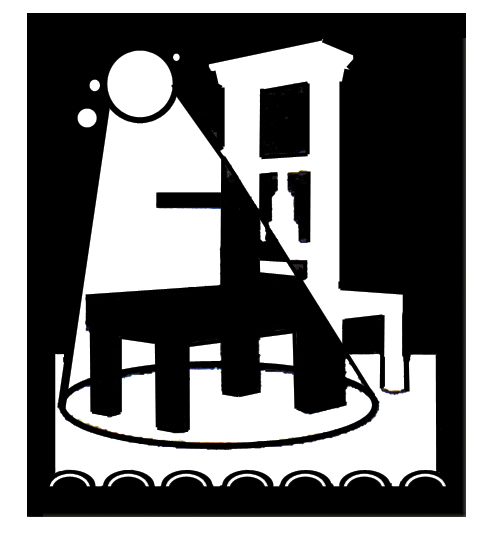
- Type: Musical Theatre
- Founded: 1964
- Headquarters: Dundee
- Website: http://www.tlms.net/

Thomson-Leng Musical Society is a Dundee-based theatrical organization that produces musical theatre productions of varied genres. Originally established for employees of D. C. Thomson & Co., the society includes members from the general public.

== History ==
Founded in 1964, Thomson-Leng Musical Society was originally established for employees of D.C. Thomson & Co. Ltd. In 1998, Agnes and Brian Boardman created the Thomson-Leng Youth Music Theatre. The society celebrated their 60th anniversary in 2024.

The Society produces one main musical production and a pantomime each year along with other events held throughout the year.

== Committee ==
The Management Committee of Thomson-Leng Musical Society is composed of three Executive Committee members and other active committee members. The members are elected at the Annual General Meeting, which is held in the Autumn. The Committee oversees the running of both Thomson-Leng Musical Society (TLMS) and Thomson-Leng Youth Music Theatre (TLYMT).

== Previous Shows ==
Year	Show	Year	Show
1965	Oklahoma!	1981	Call Me Madam
1966	Carousel	1982	Irene
1967	Wizard of Oz	1983	Fiddler on the Roof
1968	Waltz Times	1984	Kiss Me, Kate
1969	Guys and Dolls	1985	Camelot
1970	The Gondoliers	1986	Pink Champagne
1971	La Vie Parisienne	1987	No, No, Nanette
1972	Oklahoma!	1988	South Pacific
1973	Fiddler on the Roof	1988	Celebration in Song
1974	Viva Mexico	1989	The New Moon
1975	Paint Your Wagon	1990	Show Boat
1976	White Horse Inn	1991	Summer Song
1977	Guys and Dolls	1992	The Student Prince
1978	Annie Get Your Gun	1993	Anything Goes
1979	The Gypsy Baron	1994	Hello Dolly
1980	My Fair Lady	1995	Irene
