= Ellis Watson =

Scottish businessman

Ellis Watson has held senior positions at companies such as Menzies, FirstGroup, Syco and DC Thomson.

== Information ==
Watson was on the Board of Menzies Distribution from 2005 until mid-2009. He left Menzies in 2009 to take up a position on the board of FirstGroup. He was headhunted for the position of CEO of Simon Cowell's Syco Entertainment Group.

For the preceding three years, he was the Managing Director of Mirror Group Newspapers – responsible for some five national and 240 regional newspapers. The Mirror Group employed him in 2003 expecting him to increase circulation.

Prior to this, Ellis spent three years as the CEO of Celador, where he was largely responsible for the spread of the Who Wants to Be a Millionaire? format, spanning some 100 countries.

In September 2011 Ellis Watson was appointed Managing Director of Newspapers for DC Thomson. In 2012 he became Chief Executive Officer of DC Thomson Publishing.

Ellis Watson is currently, as at September 2018, Executive Chairman of DC Thomson Media as well as DC Thomson's subsidiary companies; Brightsolid, Wild & Wolf and Breakthrough Dundee.
