= Naming rights =

Legal right to give a name to a facility or event

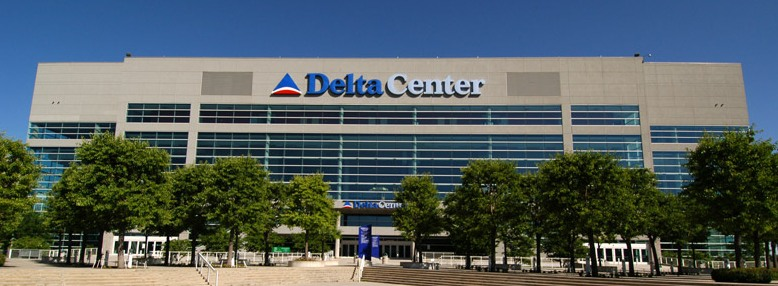
The main indoor arena in Salt Lake City was named the Delta Center from 1991 to 2006. In 2023, Delta Air Lines re-bought the naming rights.

Naming rights are a form of advertising or memorialization where a corporation, person, or other entity purchases the right to name a facility, object, location, program, or event (most often sports venues), typically for an agreed time. The term typically ranges from three to 20 years for properties such as multi-purpose arenas, performing arts venues, or sports fields. Longer terms are more common for higher profile venues such as professional sports facilities.

There are several different forms of naming rights. For example, a presenting sponsor attaches the name of the corporation or brand into a traditional name (e.g. Mall of America Field at Hubert H. Humphrey Metrodome and Smart Araneta Coliseum), whereas a title sponsor replaces the property's original name with a sponsor's chosen name (as with most sponsored sports venues), without referencing the previous name. Occasionally, the purchaser of naming rights may choose to donate the rights to an outside organization, typically one to which it is closely related. A notable example is Friends Arena, a major stadium in Stockholm. The facility was previously Swedbank Arena, but in 2012 the company donated the naming rights to the Friends Foundation, an organization sponsored by Swedbank combatting school bullying. Similarly, in 2018, the Kentucky Farm Bureau, a farmer lobbying and insurance organization, acquired naming rights to the University of Kentucky's new baseball park. The Farm Bureau donated those naming rights to the Kentucky Department of Agriculture, which named the venue Kentucky Proud Park after the agency's brand for agricultural products produced in that state.

== Stadiums ==
=== United States ===
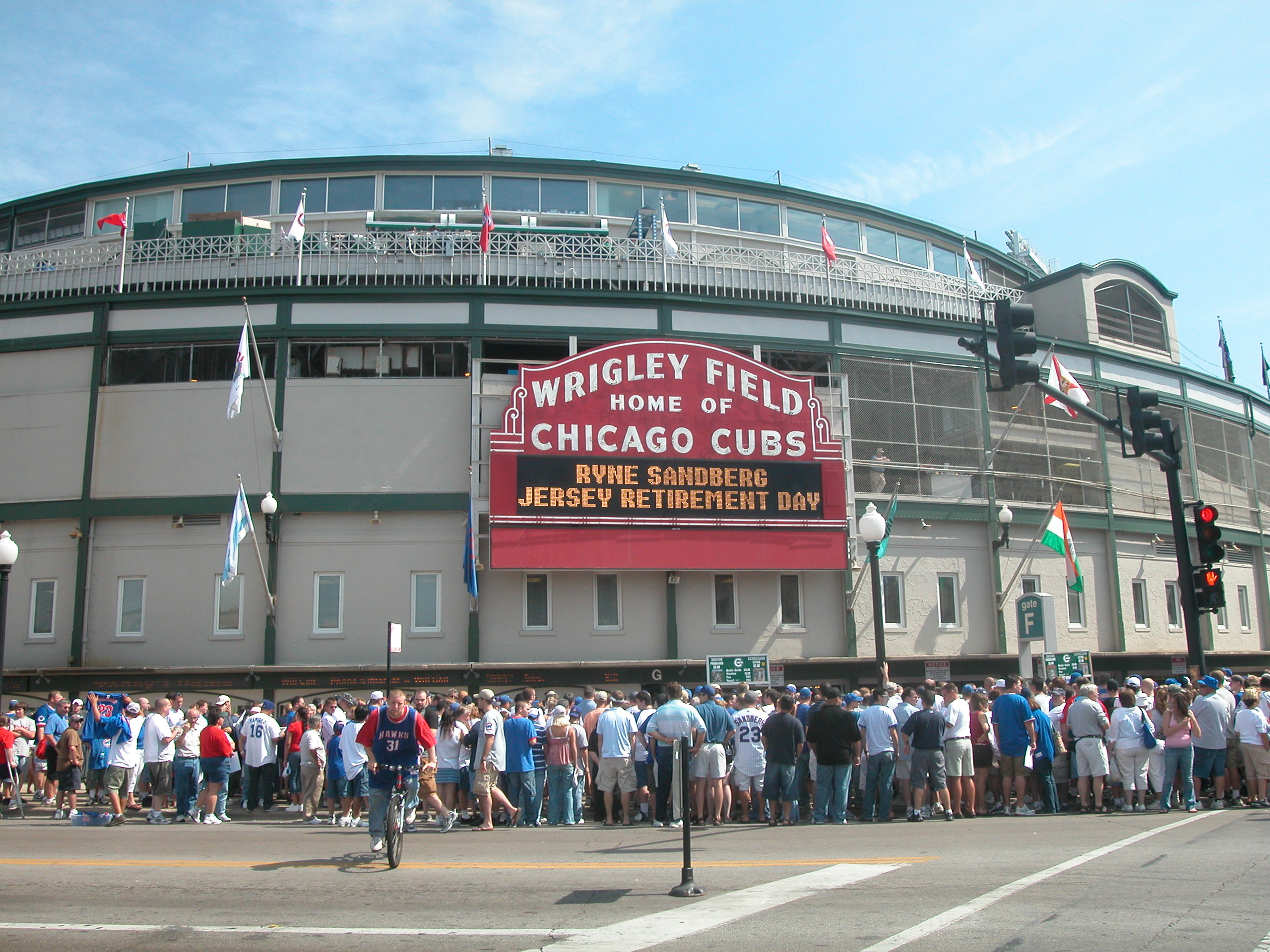
Wrigley Field, the home stadium of the Chicago Cubs, was renamed from Cubs Park in 1927 after William Wrigley Jr.

Until the 1990s, most sports stadiums in the United States were given generic or descriptive names, often after the team that played there or a person associated with the team. The history of stadiums bearing an owner's name in the United States may date as far back as 1912, with the opening of Fenway Park in Boston. The stadium's owner owned a realty company called "Fenway Realty" (named for the nearby parkland), so the promotional value of the naming was likely considered. However, it is more widely believed to begin in 1926 when William Wrigley, the chewing gum magnate and owner of the Chicago Cubs, named his team's stadium "Wrigley Field".

In 1953, Anheuser-Busch head and St. Louis Cardinals owner August Busch Jr. proposed renaming Sportsman's Park, occupied by the Cardinals, "Budweiser Stadium". When this idea was rejected by Ford Frick, the Commissioner of Baseball at that time, Anheuser-Busch proposed the title "Busch Stadium" after a company founder and the name was accepted. The venue was later replaced by Busch Memorial Stadium in 1966, and shortened to Busch Stadium in the 1970s. By the stadium's closure in 2005, Major League Baseball's policy for selling naming rights to non-owner corporations had changed—evidenced by Coors Field in Denver and Miller Park in Milwaukee (now known as American Family Field). Anheuser-Busch retained naming rights after selling the Cardinals and used the Busch name for a new Cardinal stadium opening in 2006.

Foxboro Stadium, former home of the New England Patriots, was an early example of a team selling naming rights to a company that did not own it. The stadium bore the name Schaefer Stadium (after the beer company) from opening in 1971 until 1983.

The first prominent example of a business purchasing the naming rights to a professional sporting venue as a form of advertising, rather than because the business was directly involved in the team's ownership or the venue's construction, was the opening of ARCO Arena, the home of the Sacramento Kings, in 1985. This was described as a "unique arrangement" at the time, but Kings co-owner Gregg Lukenbill suggested that it could set a precedent for other sports franchises. In college sports, Syracuse University's Carrier Dome opened with that name in 1980, after the Carrier Corporation donated $2.75 million toward the dome's construction.

The practice of selling naming rights was popularized in the late 1990s. In 1994, only 7 percent of major professional sports venues in the United States were named after a corporate sponsor. By 2004, this figure had grown to 61 percent. As of 2025, 22 of 30 MLB stadiums, 27 of 30 NFL stadiums, and 29 of 30 NBA arenas have sold or are in the process of selling their naming rights to corporate sponsors.

==== Public reaction in the United States ====
Public reaction to this practice is negative. Naming rights sold to new venues is largely accepted, especially for well-established or locally connected buyers. Examples include Rich Stadium (now Highmark Stadium) in Orchard Park, Heinz Field (now Acrisure Stadium) in Pittsburgh, and Coors Field in Denver. Selling naming rights to existing venues has been less successful, as in the attempt to rename Candlestick Park in San Francisco to 3Com Park. The public (and some media outlets) continued to call it Candlestick Park, as it was known for over three decades. After 3Com's agreement expired, rights were sold to Monster Cable, and the stadium was renamed Monster Park. San Francisco voters responded by passing an initiative (Proposition H) in the November 2004 elections, requiring name reversion to Candlestick Park once the contract with Monster expired in 2008. The initiative proved largely ceremonial, and was overturned by Proposition C in 2009 in response to difficult economic times. The naming rights to the park were never resold and the stadium was closed and demolished in 2014.

=== Other countries ===
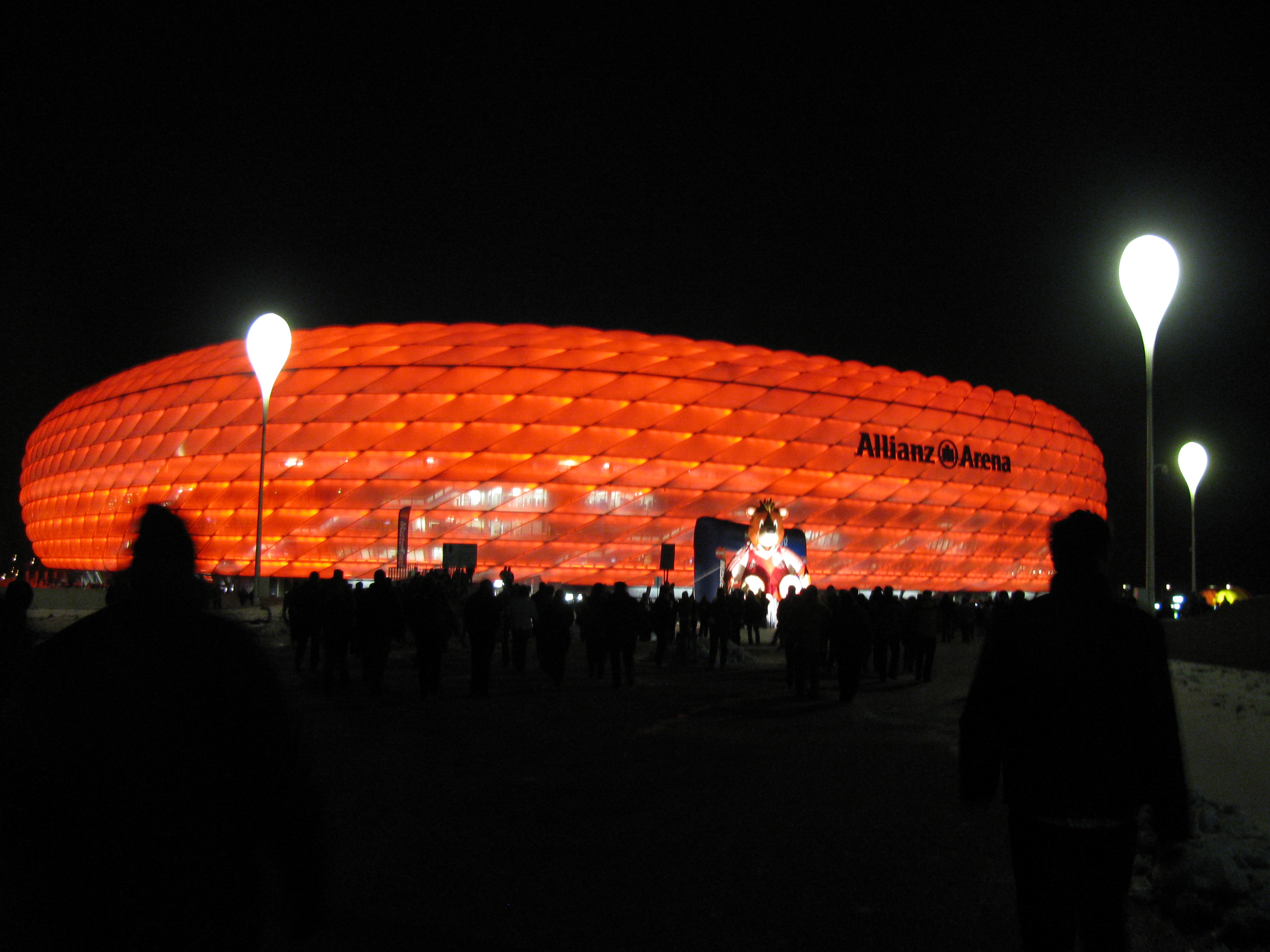
Allianz Arena, Munich, Germany in November 2008, whose naming rights were purchased by the financial services company Allianz SE

Sports stadiums with naming rights deals can be found in Australia, Japan, China, Finland, Canada, Israel and Germany, where eight of the 10 largest football stadiums sold their naming rights to corporate sponsors. The practice is widening in the United Kingdom as well. The current stadium of Bolton Wanderers is the Toughsheet Community Stadium (after 17 years as Reebok Stadium, four as Macron Stadium and five as the University of Bolton stadium) and Arsenal Football Club's stadium (opened for the 2006/2007 season) is the Emirates Stadium, their previous ground being Arsenal Stadium. In cricket, the most famous example is The Oval, home of Surrey County Cricket Club. It has had several sponsors over the years, and is currently known as "The Kia Oval", having originally been known as the "Kennington Oval", after the London district it is located within.

== Other examples ==
While the highest prices have traditionally been paid for stadium naming rights, many companies and individuals have found that selling their naming rights can be an important consideration in funding their business. Since the early 2000s, many new categories have opened, including the sale of rights to name a species of monkey for $650,000.

=== Sports events and competitions ===
Naming rights in sports are common for competitions and series as well as stadiums. Some sports teams adopt a name of the sponsor as their team or club name.

In association football, leagues and cup competitions sometimes adopt the name of their sponsors. For example, England's Premier League was known as the Barclays Premier League until 2016, and its FA Cup is officially the Emirates FA Cup. As part of a rebranding, the Premier League announced in 2015 that it would not accept a title sponsorship beginning in the 2016–17 season, citing a desire to have a cleaner branding more in line with U.S. professional leagues. Since 2020, the French Professional Football Ligue has adopted the name of Ligue 1 McDonald's.

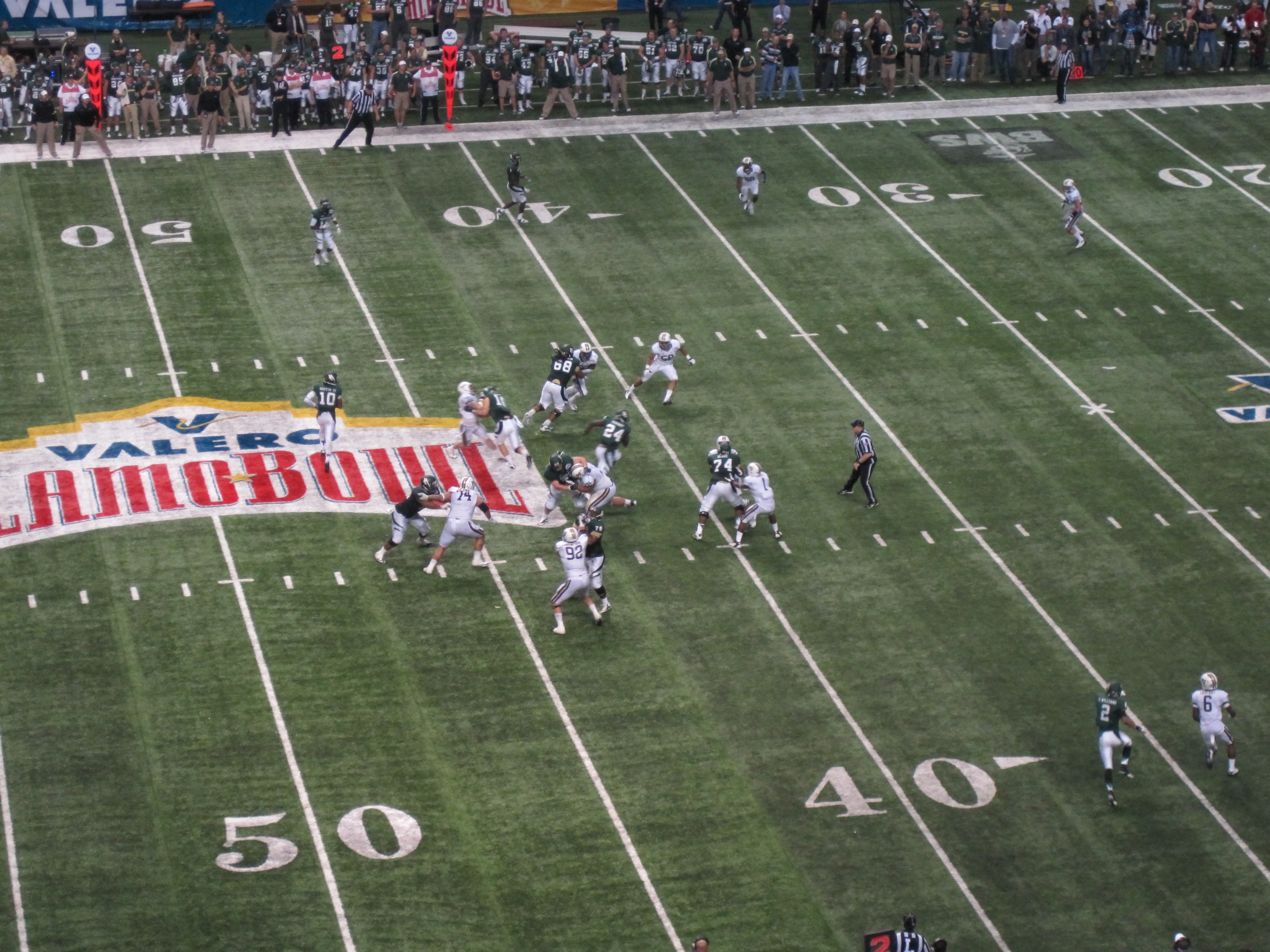
Action during the 2011 Alamo Bowl, with the logo of the corporate sponsor, Valero, at mid-field

In college football, most bowl games modify their traditional names for title sponsors, and some abandon their traditional names. Most include their traditional name (e.g. the "Rose Bowl Game presented by Prudential", "Allstate Sugar Bowl"), but have moved to sponsor-only names (e.g. the Gator Bowl was known for four playings as the TaxSlayer Bowl), a move typically unpopular with fans.

Some newer games have only had sponsored names; the Sunshine Football Classic in Miami was first played in 1990 as the Blockbuster Bowl, and has gone through multiple sponsorships since, including Carquest, MicronPC, Mazda, Champs Sports, Russell Athletic, Camping World, Cheez-It, and Pop-Tarts. The game briefly included "Tangerine Bowl" in its name following its re-location to Orlando (in an homage to the original branding of the Citrus Bowl), but has since had only sponsor names.

Team names and even whole leagues have occasionally been sold to corporate sponsors as well (examples include the New York Red Bulls in the former case, the NET10 Wireless Arena Football League for the latter), but this is generally rare in the United States and more common in other parts of the world.

During the 1980s, sanctioned auto races in NASCAR and IndyCar began to abandon their traditional names for exclusive sponsor names. The trend expanded rapidly in NASCAR until races in the 2019 Winston Cup Series featured sponsor names (including the Daytona 500, which was given a presenting sponsor as the Daytona 500 by STP), with little or no reference to original names. In the 2010s, very few exceptions remained in NASCAR (such as the Daytona 500, which no longer uses the presenting sponsor), and races without sponsor names are typically due to difficulty securing a suitable sponsor. IndyCar follows suit, with most races embracing title sponsorship; the Indianapolis 500 was an exception until 2016, when it added a presenting sponsor for the first time. Sports media coverage (such as ESPN news reports) typically refer to races by the location of the track, avoiding the use of sponsored names in news coverage.

=== Public transit ===
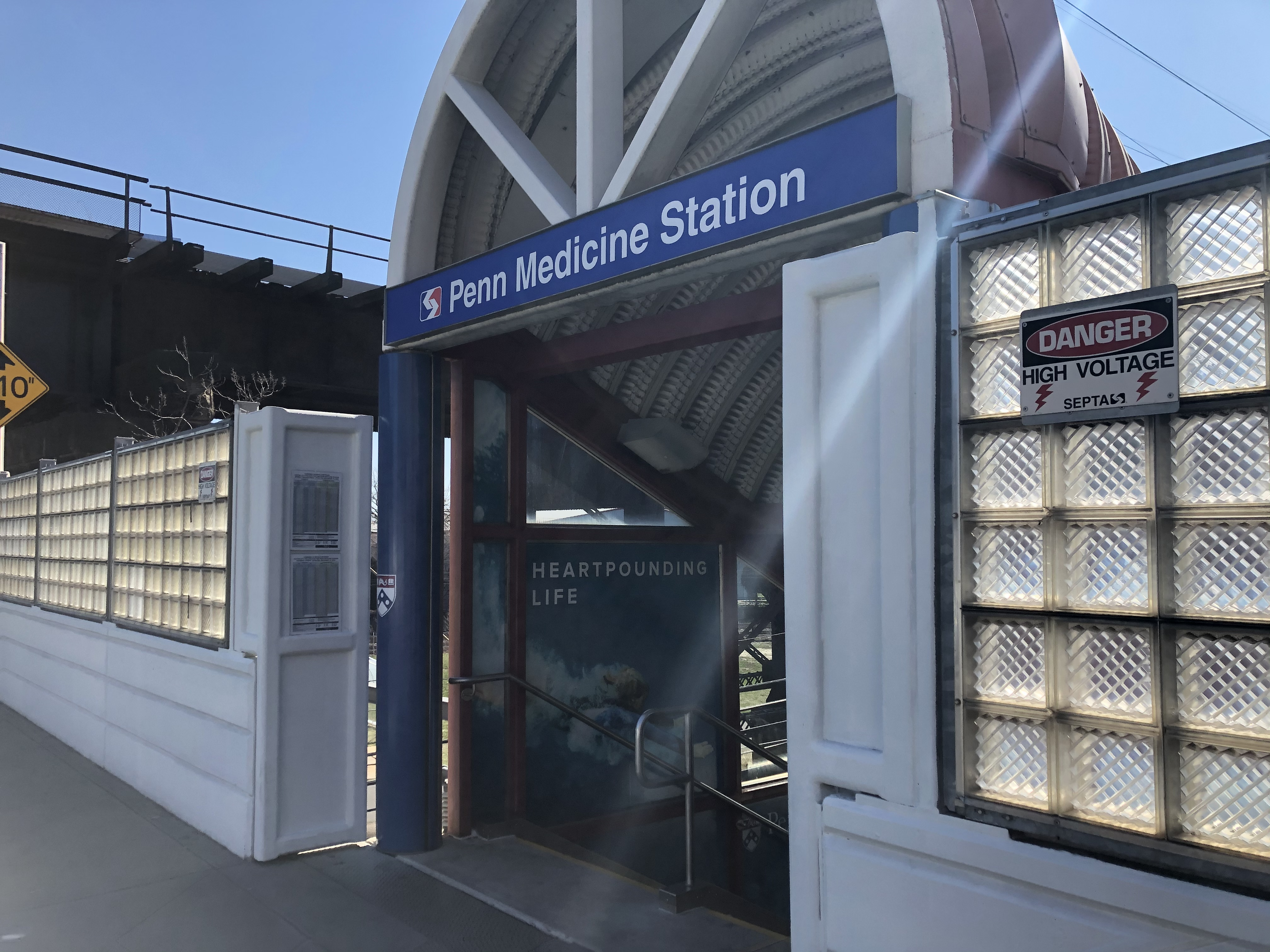
Penn Medicine Station in Philadelphia, with naming rights acquired by the University of Pennsylvania Health System

Naming rights to public transit stations have been sold in Philadelphia (NRG station, Jefferson Station, and Penn Medicine Station). Similar sales were contemplated in New York and Boston, but ruled out in San Francisco. A sponsorship for the MBTA's State Street station by Citizens Bank lasted from 1997 to 2000. In Tampa, naming rights for streetcar stations and rolling stock are available.

The San Diego Metropolitan Transit System has sold naming rights for multiple San Diego Trolley lines. In 2015, UC San Diego Health entered into a 30-year, $30 million agreement for the UC San Diego Blue Line, which also included naming rights for three stations on the line. From 2017 to 2021, MTS had a naming-rights agreement with Sycuan Casino for the Sycuan Green Line.

In December 2016, the Los Angeles County Metropolitan Transportation Authority approved a naming rights policy for its facilities and routes, but rescinded the policy two months later over potential lawsuits for skipping sponsors.

Examples outside of the United States include Madrid Metro, where Line 2 and the station Sol were renamed from 2013 to 2016 after mobile phone operator Vodafone, many stations on the Dubai Metro, and Monumento Station in the Manila Light Rail Transit System in the Philippines, which was renamed Yamaha Monumento Station in 2018, after renovations.

=== Media ===
Television and radio series, especially in the early days of each medium, frequently sold naming rights of their programs to sponsors, most of whom bankrolled the program. Examples include The Fleischmann's Yeast Hour, Texaco Star Theatre and The Philco Television Playhouse. This form of sponsorship fell out of favor in the late 1950s, although later examples include Mutual of Omaha's Wild Kingdom, which originally aired from 1963 to 1988. One of the last surviving examples is the now irregularly-airing Hallmark Hall of Fame, on the air since 1951.

=== Unofficial naming rights ===
The International Star Registry is a commercial company that since 1979 has sold unofficial naming rights to stars (i.e., the astronomical objects). The naming services are limited to an entry in a book, and carry no scientific or official authenticity according to professional astronomers.

== Most expensive naming rights ==
The record for the largest naming rights payment belongs to the Crypto.com Arena in Los Angeles. On 17 November 2021, a 20-year, US$700 million sponsorship deal was reached between Anschutz Entertainment Group and Singapore-based Crypto.com to rename the Staples Center. The Staples office supply store chain had held the arena's naming rights since the venue's opening in 1999. The center is home to NHL's Los Angeles Kings and the NBA's Los Angeles Lakers. The venue became known as Crypto.com Arena on December 25, 2021.

The record had previously belonged to Toronto's Scotiabank Arena (formerly the Air Canada Centre), which garnered CA$ 800 million (US$517 million) over 20 years starting in 2018.

The former New Meadowlands Stadium, home of the New York Giants and New York Jets in East Rutherford, New Jersey, was expected to eclipse both deals with an estimated value of US$25–30 million annually. It fell short of that benchmark, with MetLife Stadium earning $17 million annually from its deal with insurance company MetLife.

== Social connotations ==
Naming or renaming of arenas, buildings, or events is often met with public disapproval, especially in the UK and the United States. Some people consider it selling out, especially when they see no benefit to themselves. They may refuse to use a new name, preferring to use a non-branded name, especially in colloquial situations. Rebranding can also lead to confusion. In such cases, there may be a lengthy period during which the property is known by both names. A common example is Willis Tower in Chicago, often referred to as the "Sears Tower", even though the building was sold in 1994 (but retained its former name until 2003).

Some major events—particularly the Olympic and Paralympic Games, as well as FIFA tournaments—prohibit the use of corporate sponsored names on venues, construing the practice as ambush marketing. Affected venues are given a generic name for the duration of the event (e.g., General Motors Place was referred to as "Canada Hockey Place" during the 2010 Winter Olympics), and sponsored signage is obscured or removed. The Olympics also enforce a "clean venue" rule prohibiting most corporate logos—even for official sponsors—from venues, although the Paralympics allow the logos of official sponsors to be displayed in-venue. However, this policy was loosened beginning with the 2028 Summer Olympics in Los Angeles, with the International Olympic Committee allowing sponsored names to appear on the exteriors of venues (but not on the field of play itself). The LA28 organizing committee will charge sponsors for the opportunity to have their names uncovered during the Games.

Regina, Saskatchewan's "Evraz Place" was renamed Regina Exhibition Association Limited (REAL) District indoor event complex. Discussing its rebranding, the owner recalled the complex had sometimes received shipments and communications meant for the Evraz steel company due to the mistaken belief that the steel company's North American division was based there.

Naming rights on buildings or structures protected by cultural heritage laws have also been criticized. In Semarang, Central Java, Indonesia, a railway station named Semarang Tawang, which is protected by the 2010 Cultural Heritage Act No. 11, was renamed "Semarang Tawang Bank Jateng station" after Bank Jateng on 11 April 2023. The new name is reflected in signages, mobile ticketing applications, train and station announcements, and other public information. Its naming rights were acquired from an agreement between KAI and Yogyakarta-based advertising company Berlian Promosindo (Tegsa Advertising). Its new name was criticized by historian Johanes Christiono, due to the lack of national or local laws or regulations regarding renaming of cultural heritage objects.

== Nonprofit usage ==
Nonprofit organizations have the option to recognize major gifts by bestowing naming rights to a property to recognize the donor's financial support. This practice is not considered a private sector financial transaction. For example, in honor of more than $60 million cumulatively donated by one sponsor to the National Air and Space Museum properties, the directors of the Smithsonian Institution named its satellite facility in Loudoun County, Virginia, after the donor, calling it the Steven F. Udvar-Hazy Center.

Walgreen Coast, a portion of the coast of Antarctica, was named because the Walgreens pharmacy chain sponsored the Byrd Antarctic Expedition.

== See also ==
- Sponsor (commercial)
