= Findmypast =

Online genealogy service based in the UK, owned by DC Thomson

- Company type: Limited company
- Industry: Genealogy; Online publishing Online services
- Founded: 1965
- Headquarters: London, United Kingdom
- Key people: Sarah Bush (Managing Director)
- Owner: DC Thomson
- Number of employees: 51–200
- Website: www.findmypast.co.uk

Findmypast is a UK-based online genealogy service owned, since 2007, by British company DC Thomson. The website hosts billions of searchable records of census, directory and historical record information. It originated in 1965 when a group of genealogists formed a group named "Title Research". The first internet website went live in 2003.

As of 2018, Findmypast has partnered with many other genealogical organisations and hosts much of their data. It started sponsoring Yesterday, a UKTV channel, in 2010 and produced a series of programmes.

== History ==
=== Title Research Group ===
In 1965, a small group of professional genealogists and probate researchers called themselves "Title Research". They did much of their research using microfiche records. In 2001, Title Research started an in-house project, called "1837 online", to produce a computerised version of the birth, marriage and death register pages of the General Register Office (GRO), and the following year began work to put this on an internet website. Another online project, FreeBMD, had already been working on this since 1999, gradually transcribing the indexes through the efforts of volunteers and publishing searchable indexes freely on the internet.

=== 1837online ===
In April 2003, www.1837online.com went live on the internet. This was a pay-per-view service allowing access to images of the pages of the original GRO registers. Initially there was no index of individual entries for the period before 1984, but subsequent years had already been electronically recorded by the GRO and were fully searchable. Gradually the UK Censuses, passenger lists, and other databases were added to the site, the first being an index of the 1861 England and Wales Census in 2005.

=== Findmypast ===
1837online rebranded as Findmypast in November 2006 because its scope had spread beyond the GRO registers, and was awarded the Queen's Award for Innovation in 2007 for the "provision of public internet access to official genealogy records". In 2007 it acquired United States–based PedigreeSoft, a web-based family tree building platform. Later in 2007 it was purchased from Title Research Group by DC Thomson. In 2008 Findmypast published the 1851 and 1901 censuses online, and it also gained a license to publish the United Kingdom Census 1911. In 2011 it became sponsor of the Society of Genealogists in their centenary year and agreed a reciprocal arrangement where each would give access to one another's online databases.

A sister site for Australia and New Zealand was launched in May 2010 with findmypast.ie launched in the Republic of Ireland a year later, followed by findmypast.com in the United States and Canada in July 2012.

=== New user interface ===
In early April 2014, Findmypast changed their website interface and received subscriber complaints demanding the return of the old site. The editor of Who Do You Think You Are magazine wrote: "Nothing annoyed people more than the feeling that they weren't being listened to". Findmypast responded, saying they now had "a system in place to analyse all of our customers' feedback and make the necessary improvements as quickly as possible".

In June 2014 Family Tree magazine ran a three-page article on Findmypast's new interface. A Findmypast spokesperson stated, "The new search has fantastic potential" but "constant tweaks are being made to the site". They stated that they would extend customers' subscriptions if they were having difficulty. Family Tree responded that it "all sounds very encouraging... [but] the technologists had perhaps won out over the genealogists". The Family Tree forum administrator stated, "After wrestling with the new website ...for nearly a month, I was on the point of giving up... [but] I can now see that there are indeed many improvements and benefits". The magazine concluded by stating that "Many of our questions remain unanswered and we are still waiting to hear what Findmypast has to say".

A researcher from Family Search reported in December 2014 that she found using the Findmypast web site had got easier.

=== Recent history ===
Findmypast has billions of searchable records worldwide but, though it is possible to search their indexes for free, a payment or subscription was required to access the full data.

In 2014, Findmypast, in partnership with the Imperial War Museum, entered into a collaboration to launch the "Lives of the First World War" platform. During the centenary period, anyone could sign up for an account, and those who paid for a subscription had the ability to add records from Findmypast's collections.

In November 2015, Findmypast and the National Archives made the 1939 national identity register available online.

As of 2017, the website hosted a wide variety of census, directory, historical record, church and newspaper information available from across the English-speaking world and tends to concentrate on the former British empire and the UK.

On 6 January 2022, Findmypast and the National Archives made the England and Wales component of the 1921 United Kingdom census available online. The information was available on a pay-per-view basis. Unrestricted access to Premium subscribers became available from October 2022 onwards.

== Partnerships and acquisitions ==
Chris Hollins, the host of Find My Past, with Evie Leatham, a descendant of Lord Carnarvon

Findmypast has partnerships with several family history organisations, libraries and archives, including the Federation of Family History Societies, the Society of Genealogists, FamilySearch (through which members of the Church of Jesus Christ of Latter-day Saints get free FindMyPast accounts), The British Library, The National Archives and the National Archives of Ireland.

In June 2014 it acquired two more family history providers, Origins.net and the United States–based Mocavo.com. In July 2018 Findmypast announced it was partnering with Living DNA, a British company that specialises in DNA testing and analysis.

== In the media ==
Findmypast began sponsoring the UKTV channel Yesterday in July 2010, and another TV series named Find My Past, funded by findmypast.co.uk, was broadcast from October 2011. UKTV stated that it was the first example of a product placement and advertiser funded programming deal for a factual TV series in the country. Presented by Chris Hollins, the series won best Content Partnership at the 2012 Broadcast Digital Awards. An American remake called "Follow your Past" was shown on Travel Channel in 2016.

The website is one of the commercial web services used as resources in the BBC genealogy series Who Do You Think You Are?
