= The Courier (Dundee) =

Newspaper published by DC Thomson in Dundee, Scotland

- Digital version of the 15 February 2013 Perth edition
- Type: Daily newspaper
- Format: Tabloid (since 2012, previously broadsheet)
- Owner: DC Thomson
- Editor: David Clegg
- Founded: 1801 (225 years ago)
- Headquarters: Dundee, Scotland, UK
- Circulation: 12,946 (as of June 2026)
- Website: www.thecourier.co.uk

The Courier (known as The Courier & Advertiser between 1926 and 2012) is a newspaper published by DC Thomson in Dundee, Scotland. As of 2013, it is printed in six regional editions: Dundee, Angus & The Mearns, Fife, West Fife, Perthshire, and Stirlingshire. However, by 2020, this had been reduced to three regional editions for Perth and Perthshire; Angus and Dundee; and Fife.

As of August 2025, the circulation for The Courier stands at 14,836, this was a decrease from December 2024, where the average daily circulation of The Courier was 15,737, both figures are significantly down from the 30,179 copies sold in December 2019.

== History ==
Established in 1801 as the Dundee Courier & Argus, the entire front page of The Courier used to contain classified advertisements – a traditional newspaper format for many years. In 1809 it was taken over by Robert Rintoul who used the paper to campaign for political reform, and criticism of local politicians such as Alexander Riddoch.

In 1926, during the General Strike The Courier was merged with The Advertiser. From the 10 May to 28 May 1926, the paper adopted the headline-news format of The Advertiser, before reverting to its previous format which it maintained until 1992. The next major change to the newspaper came on 21 January 2012, when it changed to a compact format, having previously existed as a broadsheet. Editor Richard Neville said the move represented the "dawn of a new era" and that the company was "investing in new sections, increasing content across the title and investing significantly in resources." Just over a year later, a digital version of the newspaper was launched. In 2016, the year of its bicentenary, The Courier was named the UK Regional Newspaper of the Year.

In 2022, The Courier was named Scotland's news website of the year at the Scottish Press Awards.

== Archive ==
Historical copies of the Dundee Courier, dating back to 1844, are available to search and view in digitized form at The British Newspaper Archive.
