= Helpling =

Online platform for cleaning and household-related services

Helpling GmbH & Co. KG
- Company type: E-commerce CRM
- Headquarters: Berlin, Germany,
- Area served: worldwide
- Owner: Helpling GmbH
- Founders: Benedikt Franke, Philip Huffmann
- CEO: Philip Huffmann
- Services: Home cleaning
- Website: www.helpling.com
- Launched: 2014; 12 years ago

Helpling GmbH & Co. KG is an online platform for cleaning services and household-related services with over 42 subsidiaries worldwide. The company was founded in 2014 by Benedikt Franke and Philip Huffmann. The Helpling Group is headquartered in Berlin, Germany.

== History ==
2014 In the first few months after the market launch, Helpling focused on expanding throughout Germany and Europe, expanding the customer experience and broadening brand awareness.

Helpling expanded into France, the Netherlands, Austria, Sweden, Spain and Australia in the spring of 2014. The Helpling app went live in the middle of the year and with Helpling Singapore the company expanded into Asia for the first time.

2015 In July, Helpling acquired Hassle.com, one of Europe's largest competitors for home services and market leader at the time in Great Britain. The acquisition expanded Helpling's sphere of activity to include Great Britain and Ireland. With this market leadership in Europe Helpling focused on achieving profitability.

As part of the acquisition, Helpling migrated its platform globally to Hassle.com's technology, which is designed to enable long-term relationships between cleaners and customers: the migration improved Helpling's user experience. The new platform allows customers to browse individual profiles before booking. In addition, it offers cleaners and customers more features to manage their business relationship directly on the platform.

February Helpling goes live in the United Arab Emirates, further expanding its global business.

September Helpling expands its locations in Brazil, Canada, Sweden and Spain and acquires GetYourHero in France. In the years that followed, some markets were closed and focus markets were defined.

2016 Helpling migrates to Hassle.com's technology platform.

2019 MySkills Academy is founded. Helpling's training and community building initiative supports people in their job search via digital platforms. Helpling builds a B2B segment through the acquisition of Book a Tiger.

Helpling achieves profitability for the first time

2020 Helpling works with the first franchisees in France and strengthens the B2B business by founding goodworkvibes, a community building initiative and media platform for office management.

2021 Helpling reorganizes its brand architecture and develops the Helpling Group as a higher authority.

The Helpling Group continues to invest in its premium offering through the acquisition of Call Jeffrey.

== Business Models & Subsidiaries ==
The Helpling Group has combined various business models. Helpling Select serves as a platform for self-employed cleaners to generate customers, manage customer relationships and solve invoices. Here Helpling is the market leader in Germany. Helpling Premium provides household help who are employed by partner companies and offer a service around the household. The B2B area is covered by Tiger Facility Services, an office service provider, and goodworkvibes, a magazine for office managers. The MySkills Academy trains service providers to get started working on digital platforms.
