= Cheltenham Ladies' College =

Girls' school in Cheltenham, Gloucestershire, England

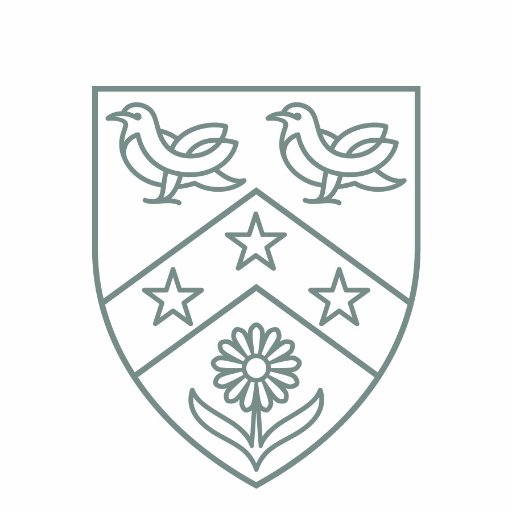

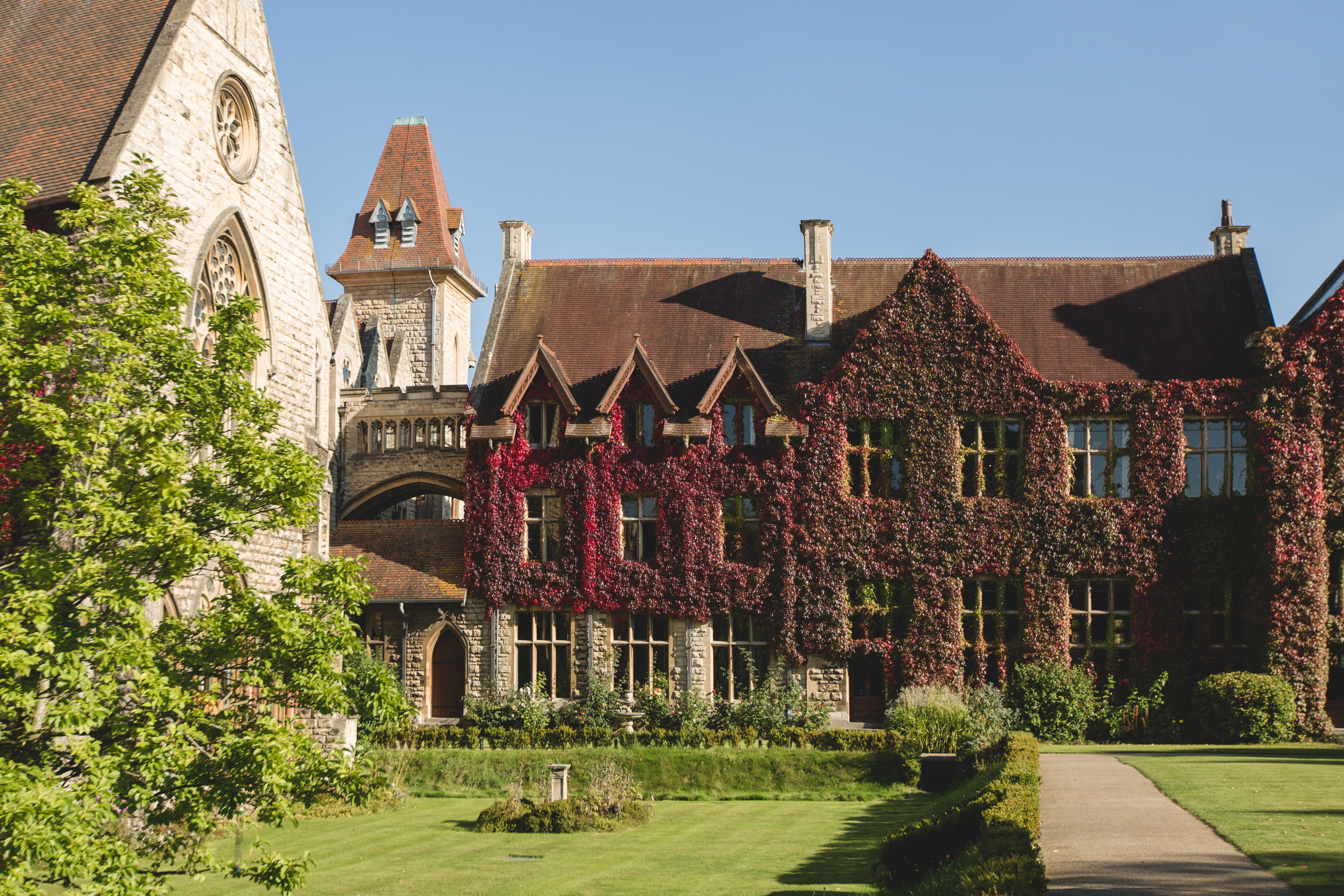

Location
- Bayshill Road; Cheltenham, Gloucestershire, GL50 3EP; England; 51°53′52″N 2°4′53″W

Information
- Type: Private school Boarding and day school
- Motto: Latin: Cœlesti Luce Crescat (May she grow in Heavenly light)
- Religious affiliation: Church of England
- Established: 1853; 173 years ago
- Principal: Eve Jardine-Young
- Staff: 215
- Gender: Girls
- Age: 11 to 18
- Enrolment: 850
- Colour: CLC Green
- Website: cheltladiescollege.org

Cheltenham Ladies' College (CLC) is a private boarding and day school for girls aged 11 or older in Cheltenham, Gloucestershire, England. The school was established in 1853 to provide "a sound academic education for girls". It is also a member of the Headmasters' and Headmistresses' Conference. It is widely known as the "female version of Eton" due to its elite status, highly academic reputation, and standing as a premier all-girls' boarding school in the UK, with British prestige, academic rigor and remains one of the most prominent all-girls schools globally.

The school badge depicts two martlets, inspiration for which was taken from the pigeons of the Cheltenham town coat of arms, above three stars, which are in turn above a daisy, a school symbol.

In 2020, Cheltenham Ladies' College was named Southwest Independent School of the Decade by The Times and The Sunday Times. It is listed in The Schools Index as one of the world's 150 leading schools and one of the top 30 UK senior schools.

== History ==
The school was founded in 1853 after six individuals, including the Principal and Vice-Principal of Cheltenham College and four other men, decided to create a girls' school that would be similar to Cheltenham College. On 13 February 1854, the first 82 pupils began attending the school, with Annie Procter serving as the school's Principal. In 1858, upon Procter resigning from her position, the Principal's post was taken by Dorothea Beale, a prominent suffragist educator who later founded St Hilda's College, Oxford. Beale, Louisa Lumsden and Frances Dove maintained their strong links with Cheltenham's contemporary, St Leonard's School. Beale was commemorated by a Cheltenham Civic Society blue plaque in 2017. In 1998, it was announced that sixth-form girls at the school would be allowed to wear trousers for the first time.

== Structure and academic results ==
The school is divided into three divisions, Lower College (KS3), Upper College (KS4) and Sixth Form College (KS5). The school gives pupils a choice in what they study. A range of subject combinations is available to Upper College girls at GCSE, and for Sixth Form girls at A-level or International Baccalaureate (IB). Tutors are full-time academic members of staff and advise girls on matters relating to their academic work and progress, while the Professional Guidance Centre gives advice on career options and university applications. Most pupils go on to continue higher education.

The school's academic results are high, both compared to the national average and within the independent sector. From 2014 to 2017, the school reported that over two thirds of A-level results and approximately 90% of GCSE results were A* or A grades. Since 2015, the school has been the top girls boarding school in the country for IB results for three consecutive years. In 2019, 71% of students scored A*/A for their A-level examinations while 90% scored A*/A for GCSE. In 2024, 69.5% of students scored A*/A for their A-level examinations while 85.7% scored A*/A for GCSE.

== Houses ==
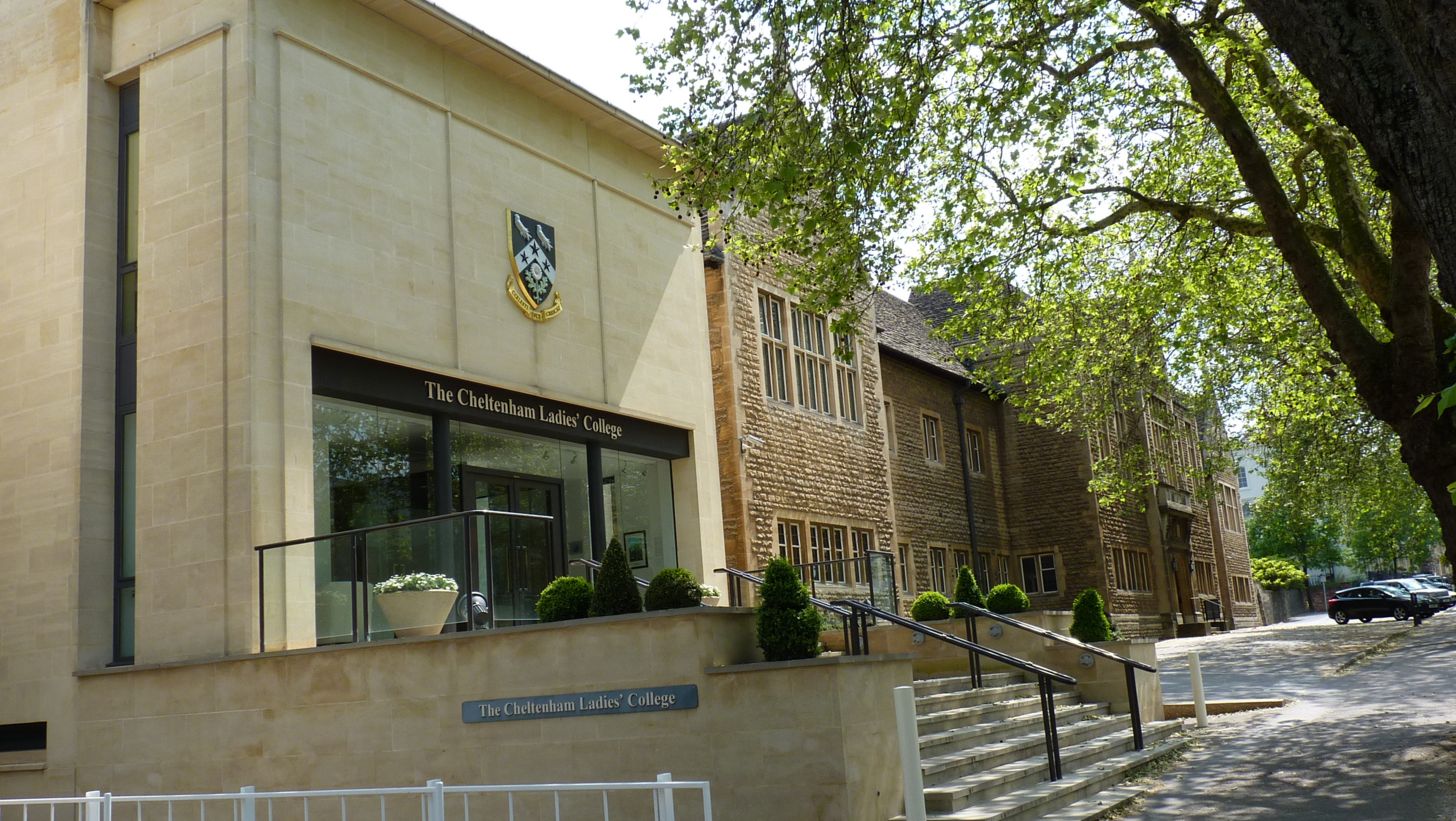
Entrance to the school

The school is made up of around 80% boarders and 20% day girls. Whether boarders or day girls, pupils are part of a junior or senior house system.

Girls who board live in one of eleven boarding houses. There are six junior houses for 11- to 16-year-olds, and five senior houses for sixth form girls. The junior houses are Farnley Lodge, Glenlee, Sidney Lodge, St. Austin's, St. Helen's, and St. Margaret's. At Sixth Form, all girls move to a senior house. The senior houses are Beale, Cambray, Elizabeth, Roderic and St. Hilda's.

The junior day girl house is Eversleigh, which is a short walk from the main college site. The senior day girl house, Bayshill, is situated in the main college site.

== Co-curriculars ==
Over 160 co-curricular activities are available.

=== Music and Drama ===
The Music and Drama departments offer productions and concerts each year involving all age groups. Over 1,000 individual instrumental lessons take place each week.

In October 2009, Sir Richard Eyre opened the school's new drama building, The Parabola Arts Centre (PAC). The building was built by Foster Wilson Architects and cost over £12.5 million, funded by donations. The school is a major sponsor of the Cheltenham Music, Literature, Jazz and Science Festivals and events are hosted at the centre annually. The PAC building was awarded the RIBA award. In 2010, Sharman Macdonald (Keira Knightley's mother) was commissioned to write the college's play. In 2016, the school also invested in a new recording studio.

=== Sports ===
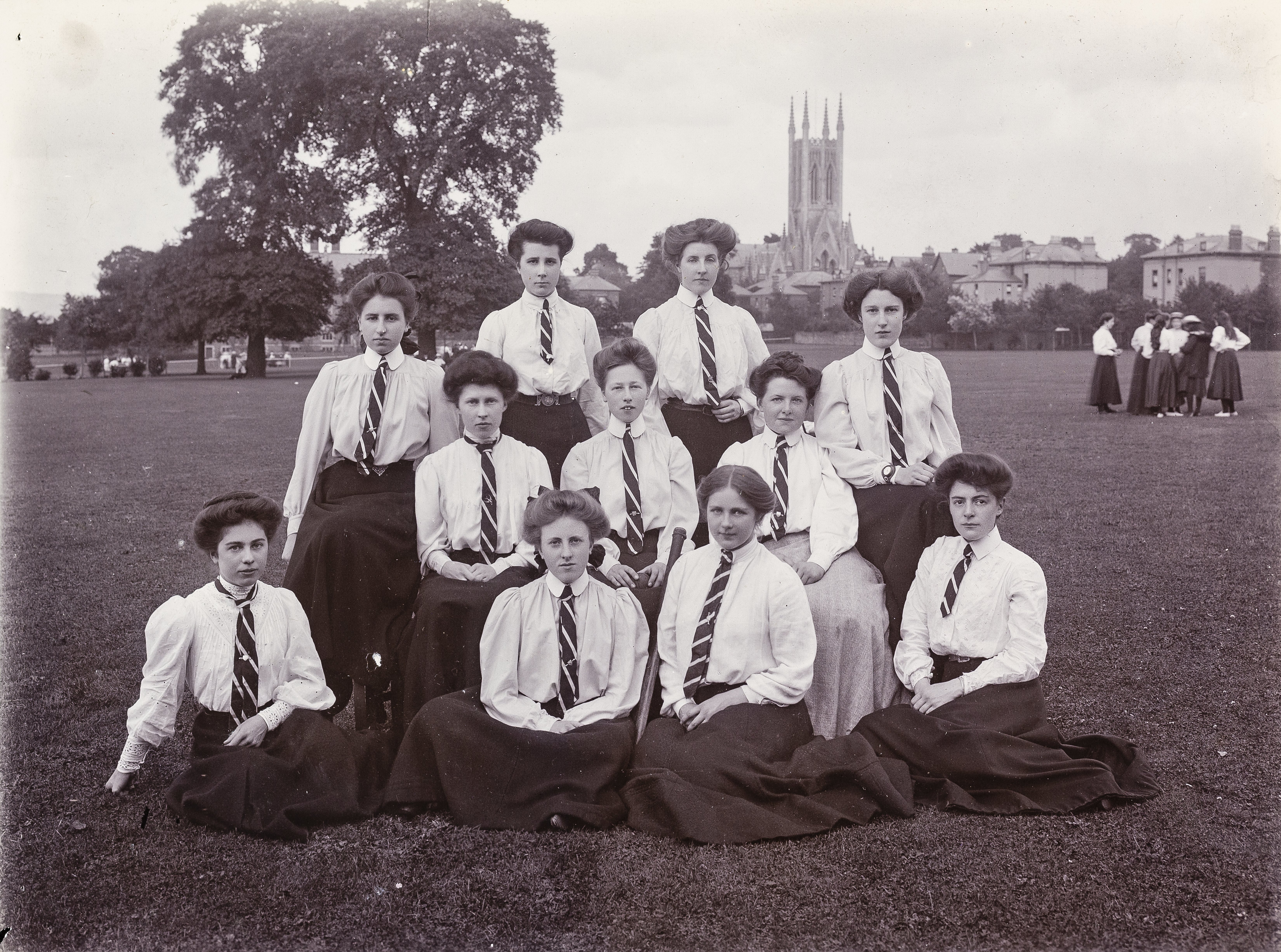
Cheltenham Ladies College Cricket 1st XI Summer Term 1907

In 2018, the school opened a new Health and Fitness Centre.

Sports facilities include a 25-metre six-lane swimming-pool, netball courts, tennis courts, squash courts, AstroTurf fields, lacrosse pitches, a spin studio, two dance studios and two sports halls.

Over 30 sports are offered, and students are encouraged to maintain their fitness and wellbeing through physical exercise. The main sports are Netball, Lacrosse and Hockey in the winter, and Tennis, Swimming and Athletics in the Summer. The school also has a well-established Rowing Club, and Equestrian and Ski teams.

== Admissions ==
The school is one of the hardest UK private schools to get into, with competition for places at sixth form being "fierce". Entry to Cheltenham Ladies' College is by examination for girls aged 11+, 13+ and 16+ (Sixth Form), as well as occasionally at 12+ and 14+ where only a few students are admitted.

== Inspections ==
The school was last inspected by the Independent Schools Inspectorate in October 2014. It achieved the grade "Excellent" in all areas.

In the Financial Times' secondary school ranking, Cheltenham Ladies College was placed at no. 14 in 2010 and no. 34 in 2011. The college was the top girls boarding school and 6th overall in UK rankings for the International Baccalaureate Diploma in 2017.

The Tatler School Guide 2018 notes that "confident, resilient, clever girls flourish" at the college. The Good Schools Guide described the school as "a top flight school with strong traditional values and a clear sense of purpose. For the bright and energetic all rounder this school offers an exceptional education that is both broad and deep, with endless opportunities for fun and enrichment along the way."

In 2020, Cheltenham Ladies' College was named South West Independent Secondary School of the Decade by The Times and The Sunday Times. The awards, published in the "Parent Power" schools guide, commend schools that have achieved academic excellence and provided an outstanding education over the previous decade.

== Coat of arms ==
The college was granted a coat of arms by the College of Arms in 1931:

Coat of arms of Cheltenham Ladies' College

Granted
30 January 1931
Escutcheon
Sable, on a chevron argent between in chief two martlets of the second and in base a daisy slipped and leaved proper, three mullets of the field.
Motto
Coelesti luce crescat.

== In popular culture ==
As one of the oldest and most prestigious all-girls' boarding schools in the UK, the school has often been referred to as "the girls' Eton". However, the school has worked hard to play down this reputation.

In 2008 BBC Four made a three-part documentary series titled My New Best Friend to emphasise the importance and nature of friendship among children. The first episode tracked the journey of four young girls starting at Cheltenham Ladies' College.

Cheltenham Ladies' College is mentioned in the film St Trinian's (2007) as the previous school of the main character.

== List of Principals ==
- Annie Proctor, 1854–1858
- Dorothea Beale, 1858–1906
- Lilian Faithfull, 1906–1922
- Beatrice Sparks, 1922–1937
- Margaret Popham, 1937–1953
- Joan Tredgold, 1953–1964
- Margaret Hampshire, 1964–1979
- Joan Sadler, 1979–1987
- Enid Castle, 1987–1996
- Vicky Tuck, 1996–2011
- Gwen Byrom, 2011 (Acting)
- Eve Jardine-Young, 2011–present

== Notable staff ==
- Basil Allchin (1878–1957), organist
- Winifred Lily Boys-Smith (1865–1939)
- U. A. Fanthorpe (1929–2009), poet
- Charlotte Laurie (1856–1933), botanist
- Eleanor Mary Reid (1860–1953), palaeobotanist
- Millicent Taylor (1871–1960), chemist, petitioner to the Chemical Society
- Mary Watson (1856–1933), chemist
- Gustav Holst (1874–1934), composer
- Agnes Tschetschulin (1859–1942), composer and violinist

== Notable pupils ==
Guild is the association of College's former pupils.

=== The arts ===
- Ithell Colquhoun, artist, author and occultist
- Enid de Chair, artist and art patron
- Florence Farr, actress and mistress of George Bernard Shaw
- Katharine Hamnett, fashion designer
- Damaris Hayman, actress
- Cherry Healey, television presenter
- Rosalind Knight, actress
- Judith Ledeboer, architect and housing reformer
- Leyly Matine-Daftary, modernist painter
- Charlotte Reather, comedy writer and actress
- Bridget Riley, artist
- Talulah Riley, actress
- Dame Kristin Scott Thomas, actress
- Serena Scott Thomas, actress
- Sophie Solomon, violinist
- Amanda Wakeley, fashion designer

=== Politics, law and civil service ===
- Violet Brooke-Hunt, community organizer and volunteer in Boer War
- Elizabeth Gass, Lady Gass, Lord Lieutenant of Somerset since 1998
- Dame Cheryl Gillan, Conservative Member of Parliament and former Secretary of State for Wales
- Sally Keeble, Labour Member of Parliament
- Lizzy Lind af Hageby, speaker and writer antivivisection and feminism
- Rachel Lomax, the first woman Deputy Governor of the Bank of England
- Fiona Mactaggart, Labour Member of Parliament
- Cicely Mayhew, UK's first female diplomat
- Gareth Peirce, defence lawyer
- Amber Rudd, former Home Secretary
- Liz Shore, former Deputy Chief Medical Officer
- Catherine Williamson, Canterbury's first woman mayor and Irish politician

=== Sciences, technology, engineering ===
- Mary Archer, scientist and chair of the trustees of the Science Museum Group
- Prue Barron, surgeon
- Louisa Aldrich-Blake, first female Master of Surgery
- Mary Collins, immunologist
- Maud Cunnington, archaeologist
- Vicky Goh, radiologist, cancer imaging researcher, and medical academic
- Miriam Violet Griffith, electrical engineer, technical author and pioneer of ground source heat pumps
- Lillias Hamilton, doctor and author
- Constance Leathart, Air Transport Auxiliary pilot in Second World War, first woman in Britain to design and fly a glider
- Mary Fauriel Lockett, pharmacologist, radiologist, missionary and educator
- Margaret Lowenfeld, paediatrician and child psychotherapist
- Eva Luckes, Royal Red Cross, OBE, Matron of The London Hospital 1880–1919, matron maker and influential nurse reformer.
- Dame Clare Marx, first female President of the Royal College of Surgeons (2014–2017), Chair of the General Medical Council (January 2019)
- Helen Mackay, first female Fellow of the Royal College of Physicians
- Liz Miller, former neurosurgeon and mental health campaigner
- Jennie Pryce, quantitative geneticist
- Frances Ritchie, nurse
- Lucy Wills, haematologist
- Helena Rosa Wright (née Lowenfeld), doctor and pioneer of family planning
- Nur Amalina Che Bakri, Doctor

=== Journalism and authors ===
- Hilary Andersson, journalist and presenter
- Phyllis Bentley, novelist and authority on the Brontë family
- Theodora Bosanquet, writer, reviewer, editor, amanuensis to Henry James, director and literary editor of Time and Tide (magazine).
- Rosie Boycott, journalist and former editor of The Independent and the Daily Express
- D. K. Broster, novelist
- Katharine Burdekin, author
- Amy Key Clarke, mystical poet, author and senior teacher at the school, also wrote histories of the school
- Janet E. Courtney, writer
- Tatiana Hambro, fashion writer and editor for Moda Operandi
- Beatrice Harraden, writer and suffragette
- Phoebe Hesketh, poet
- Lisa Jardine, historian, author and broadcaster
- Margaret Kennedy, novelist
- Sue Lloyd-Roberts, television journalist
- Kate Reardon, journalist
- Betty Ridley, journalist
- Mira Sethi, journalist
- May Sinclair, writer
- Caroline Spurgeon, literary critic
- Robin Stevens, children's author
- Jenny Uglow, biographer
- Margaret Winifred Vowles, author
- Sarah Wardle, poet
- Grace Wyndham Goldie, first Head of BBC News & Current Affairs
- Jan Ziff, journalist and children's writer

=== Sports ===
- Nina Clarkin, World number one female polo player
- Poppy Cooksey, Olympic fencer
- Mary Eyre, England hockey player and Wimbledon umpire
- Muriel Robb, Wimbledon Champion and only person to win all national UK tennis singles titles
- Jean Westwood, world champion ice dancer

=== Other ===
- Annette Bear-Crawford, suffragette
- Tamara Beckwith, socialite
- Mary Russell, Duchess of Bedford, 11th Duchess of Bedford
- Mary Boyce, scholar of Zoroastrianism
- Victoria Davies Randle, a socialite of Victorian Lagos, Nigeria, who served as Queen Victoria's goddaughter
- Dame Helen Gwynne-Vaughan, Commandant of the Women's Royal Air Force and Chief Controller of the Auxiliary Territorial Service
- Dorothy Christian Hare, medical director of the Women's Royal Naval Service
- Jane Ellen Harrison, classical scholar
- Hermione Hobhouse, historian
- Nicola Horlick, investment fund manager (ran away)
- Beatrice Irwin (aka Alice Beatrice Simpson), actress, poet and illumination designer entrepreneur
- Eve Jardine-Young, Principal of Cheltenham Ladies' College
- Dorothy Pethick, suffragette
- Raja Zarith Sofiah, consort of the King of Johor, Malaysia
- Agnes Royden, preacher and suffragette
- Anne Willan, Founder of École de Cuisine La Varenne (Paris, Burgundy & Los Angeles)
