= Hilary Andersson =

American journalist (born 1967)

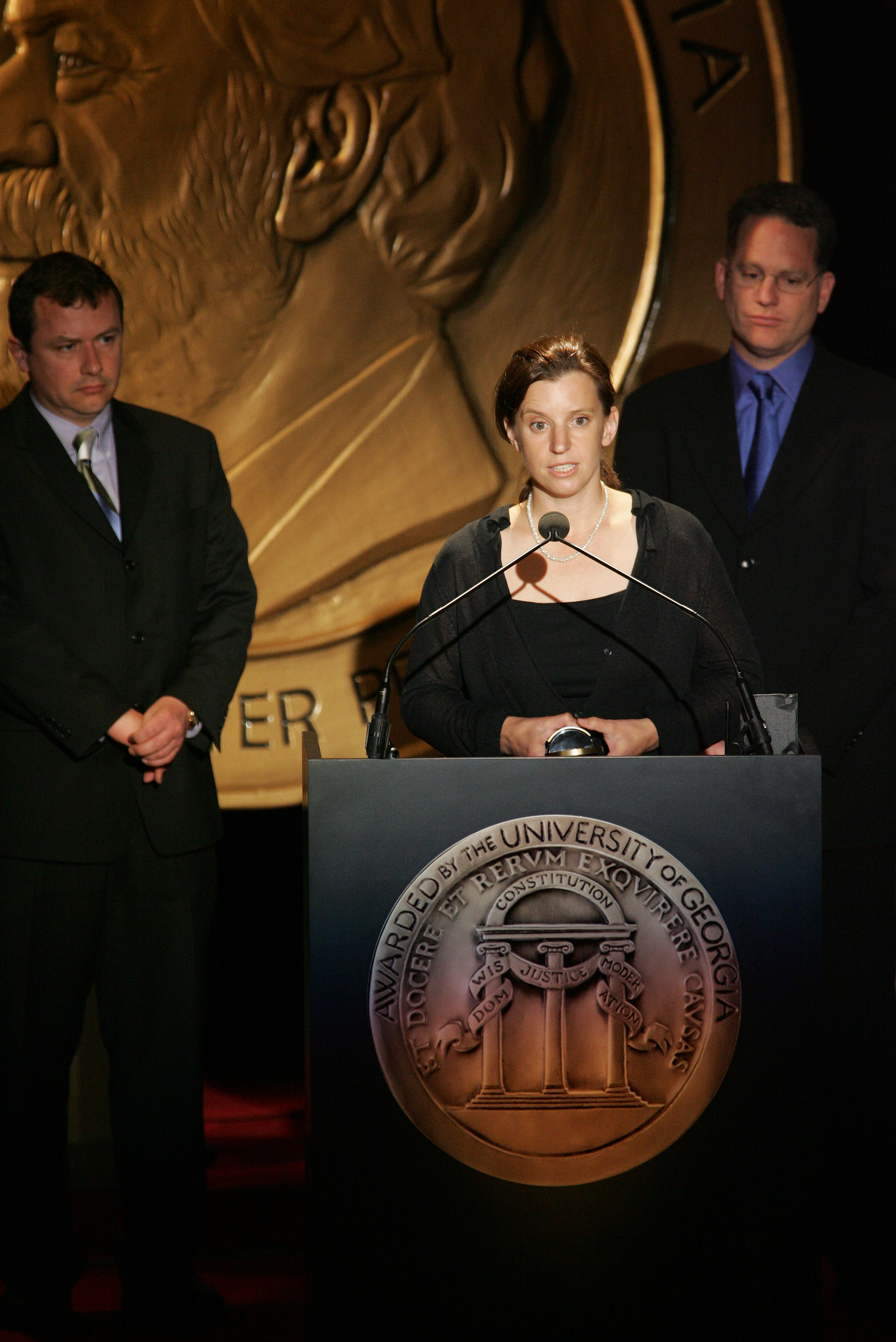
Andersson at the 64th Annual Peabody Awards in 2005

Hilary Harper Andersson (born 23 September 1967) is an American journalist presently working for the BBC. She has been a correspondent for Panorama since 2006.

Born in Austin, Texas, she grew up in Belgium, West Germany, South Africa and Saudi Arabia. Andersson was educated at Cheltenham Ladies' College and the University of Edinburgh, where she read politics.

Andersson joined the BBC in 1991 as a radio producer based in London with BBC World Service News and Current Affairs. Between 1991 and 1994, Andersson produced radio documentaries from Liberia, South Africa and Bolivia, before spending two years as a senior broadcast journalist for BBC World Television. Andersson was the BBC's Lagos correspondent from 1996 to 1999, one of only three foreign journalists allowed to enter into Nigeria under the dictatorship of General Sani Abacha. Andersson was the BBC's Jerusalem correspondent from 1999 to 2001. She then became Africa correspondent, based in South Africa.

Andersson has won the Royal Television Society (RTS) News Event award (2005), the Peabody Award, the Banff best documentary award, and the One World Media award 2005. In 2008 for her and her team's work for uncovering the first evidence that China had been helping Sudan's government militarily in Darfur, where the United Nations estimates that about 300,000 people died, she won the Amnesty International Television Documentary for her Panorama documentary "The New Killing Fields".

Andersson is currently based in Vermont and continues to make documentaries on current affairs. She also occasionally teaches at Middlebury College.
