= Margaret Hampshire =

British educator and civil servant (1918–2004)

Margaret Hampshire JP
- Born: Grace Margaret Hampshire; 9 July 1918; England, United Kingdom of Great Britain and Ireland
- Died: 6 June 2004 (aged 85); England, United Kingdom
- Citizenship: United Kingdom
- Education: Malvern Girls' School: Girton College, Cambridge; Polytechnic of Central London
- Occupations: Educator; Civil servant
- Years active: 1941–2004
- Employer: Cheltenham Ladies' College

Grace Margaret Hampshire JP (9 July 1918 – 6 June 2004) was a British educator and civil servant who served as principal of Cheltenham Ladies' College from 1964 to 1979. She began her career in the Civil Service as a member of the Board of Trade before working for the textiles firm Courtaulds between 1951 and 1964. During her principalship of Cheltenham Ladies' College, Hampshire restructured the school and made its system more modern as she retained its traditions.

== Early life ==
On 9 July 1918, Hampshire was born Grace Margaret Hampshire in England. She was the daughter of C H Hampshire, the British Pharmacopoeia Commission's secretary. Hampshire was taught at Malvern Girls' School, and went on to matriculate to Girton College, Cambridge, where she read history.

== Career ==
In 1941, she joined the Civil Service as a member of the Board of Trade. Hampshire subsequently joined the textiles firm Courtaulds in 1951, and was appointed its head of government relations departments between 1959 and 1964. She was appointed the first principal of Cheltenham Ladies' College by its governors in 1964. Hampshire arrived at the college in an era when British public schools were at danger of losing their independence under a Labour government with their egalitarian ideals and schools recognised incrementally it need to adjust to a post-war atmosphere when women across all social classes were anticipated to take up a career. Her appointment to lead one of the more well-known girls' schools in Britain caused some comment since she had no educational experience only Civil Service work.

Hampshire restructured the school to allow every sixth form student to join a boarding house dedicated for them to be more free than those in the junior houses. She oversaw the construction of a new sixth form building, which was opened by Queen Elizabeth The Queen Mother in 1971. Hampshire's reforms allowed girls who remained in the sixth form for a seventh school term to take the Oxbridge Admissions Tests to reside in college-sanctioned housing in Cheltenham itself. She instituted co-educational classes in certain lessons with boys from the nearby Cheltenham College until that came to a conclusion when the latter school began admitting girls to its sixth form. Hampshire made sure those girls in the final two years kept their teachers and tutors for that two-year period and began a forum to encourage pupils and staff to communicate ideas at every level.

She retired from the college in 1979 and served as a governor of The Alice Ottley School in Worcestershire between 1979 and 1992. Hampshire was a governor of the board of University College Hospital from 1961 until she relocated to Cheltenham in 1964. She served as a Metropolitan Borough of St Marylebone councillor from 1962 to 1964. Between 1967 and 1970, Hampshire sat on the South West Regional Hospital Board and later chaired Cheltenham General Hospital's Intestine Care Trust board from 1982 to 1985. She served as the Gloucestershire Girl Guides' county secretary between 1980 and 1985, spent one year doing a law diploma course at the Polytechnic of Central London and was a justice of the peace in Cheltenham. Hampshire was an active campaigner of girls' education; aided with the buying and operation Regent House in Cheltenham to distribute house retirees could afford to purchase; was active in the parish council; was a helper at the Cheltenham tourist office; organised a ministry to those visiting Painswick's St Mary's Church each August; and aided in getting around the logistics of the Three Choirs Festival.

== Personal life ==
She was a member of the Church of England and read sermons and conducted services in churches in her local area. Hampshire died on 6 June 2004. She did not marry.

== Methodology and legacy ==
Hampshire was described by a former pupil as "a battleship in full sail – she had a tremendous frontage". She lauded discipline but was perceived as fair and got involved in some of her pupils' party games. The correspondent for The Times wrote of Hampshire: "Margaret Hampshire was a dynamo, busily involved in many spheres of life, including business, local government, music and the Church, but most of all she used her energy to promote the education and prospects of women."
