= Vicky Goh =

Researcher

Vicky Goh is a professor, chair of clinical cancer imaging, and head of cancer imaging department at the King's College London, England, United Kingdom. She joined King's College London in 2011. She is also a consultant radiologist at Guy's and St Thomas' Hospital in London.

== Biography ==
Goh studied at Cheltenham Ladies' College, obtained a medical degree from University of Cambridge. She further trained at General Medicine and Radiology in London (UK) and University Health Network Hospitals in Toronto (Canada). She has also worked as a Consultant Oncological Radiologist at Mount Vernon Hospital in the area of colorectal cancer. She served as a president of the European Society of Oncologic Imaging in the past. She is now a chair of the academic committee at the Royal College of Radiologists, and steering committee member of the European School of Radiology.

She is interested in studying tumour heterogeneity, micro-environment, biomarker development in gastrointestinal, lung and renal cancers in humans using multi-modality functional imaging. According to Scopus, she has published 209 scientific documents with 7233 citations, and an h-index of 45. She has been mentioned on public online-blogs on several occasions for her cancer imaging work. Her ORCID profile can be found here.

Goh is a deputy editor for the Radiology journal.

== Books edited ==
- Radiotherapy in Practice - Imaging: edited by Peter J Hoskin; Vicky Goh.
- Grainger & Allison's Diagnostic Radiology: Oncological Imaging (sixth edition): edited by Victoria Goh, Andy Adam.
- MRI of the Gastrointestinal Tract: edited by Jaap Stoker (listed as a contributor).

== Chapters edited ==
- Multislice CT: edited by Konstantin Nikolaou, Fabian Bamberg, Andrea Laghi, Geoffrey D. Rubin.
- Diffusion Weighted Imaging of the Gastrointestinal Tract: edited by Sofia Gourtsoyianni, Nikolaos Papanikolaou.
- PET/MRI in Oncology: Current Clinical Applications. edited by Andrei Iagaru, Thomas Hope, Patrick Veit-Haibach.
- Methods of Cancer Diagnosis, Therapy and Prognosis: Colorectal Cancer edited by M. A. Hayat.

== Selected publications ==
She has authored numerous publications. However, the following publications have more than 300 citations:

- 514 citations: Assessment of tumor heterogeneity: an emerging imaging tool for clinical practice?
- 407 citations: Imaging biomarker roadmap for cancer studies.
- 361 citations: Critical research gaps and translational priorities for the successful prevention and treatment of breast cancer.
- 353 citations: Quantifying tumour heterogeneity in ^{18}F-FDG PET/CT imaging by texture analysis.
- 331 citations: Anal cancer: ESMO-ESSO-ESTRO Clinical Practice Guidelines for diagnosis, treatment and follow-up.
- 326 citations: Are pretreatment 18F-FDG PET tumor textural features in non–small cell lung cancer associated with response and survival after chemoradiotherapy?
- 306 citations: Assessment of primary colorectal cancer heterogeneity by using whole-tumor texture analysis: contrast-enhanced CT texture as a biomarker of 5-year survival.
- 304 citations: Non–small cell lung cancer: histopathologic correlates for texture parameters at CT.
