= Charlotte Reather =

English comedy writer, performer and journalist

Charlotte Reather is an English comedy writer, performer and journalist.

== Personal life ==
Educated at The Cheltenham Ladies’ College, Reather went on to study English literature at Kingston University. She is married to Edward Moorhouse, a Royal Marines officer. They have two children.

== Career ==
Reather started her career in comedy at the Institute of Contemporary Arts, featuring well-known performers such as Simon Munnery, Stewart Lee and Lee Mack. She has written for Newsrevue, the renowned comedy troupe based in London, writing material for their Edinburgh Festival show, which received 5 star reviews.

She co-wrote and starred in the 'GUM!GUM!' comedy sketches featuring National Youth Theatre contemporaries Beth Winslet and Marc Elliot and directed by Robert Llewellyn. This led to a pilot called 'Dirty Posh Girls' commissioned by Channel X and Fremantle. During that time Reather performed her stand up character 'Henrietta Arden-Bibby' on the circuit from 2008–2010, appearing in The Groucho Club Gang Show with Rich Fulcher from The Mighty Boosh.

Reather worked on The Bill, Dispatches and Channel 4 News. In 2004, she took part in a ‘life-swap’ for ITV1’s reality series 'Poor Little Rich Girls' and appeared on GMTV. Charlotte was host of Society Chatshow with Lady Colin Campbell and interviewed Jilly Cooper, Stefanie Powers, Sharron Davies.

She also co-presented ‘Result’ for Sky & Granada with Sacha Baron Cohen and has presented on the US network WE: Women's Entertainment and The Biography Channel for 'How to Marry a Prince.' She also made an appearance in 'Robsessed'.

She is a regular columnist and writer for NFU Countryside Magazine penning the popular column 'Charlie's Challenges' where she tries a new country craft or skill every month. She is a former humorous columnist for The Field Magazine (Wild Life 2008–2012) and occasional columnist for Country Life. She contributes to The Daily Mail, The Mail on Sunday, Sunday Express The Daily Telegraph, The Washington Post, Woman & Home, Tatler etc.

Reather wrote Extreme Fishing with Robson Green based on the successful IWC Media and Channel Five television programme, Extreme Fishing with Robson Green, published by Simon and Schuster. The book reached Number One on The Sunday Times Bestsellers list in 2013.

Reather writes a comedy blog on marriage and motherhood - Vanessa Wilde and is turning her hand at fiction.
