= Baháʼí Faith in Andorra =

The Baháʼí Faith in Andorra begins with the first mention of Andorra in Baháʼí literature when ʻAbdu'l-Bahá listed it as a place to take the religion to in 1916. The first Baháʼí to pioneer to Andorra was William Danjon Dieudonne in 1953. By 1979 a Baháʼí Local Spiritual Assembly in Andorra-la-Vella is known. In 2005 according to the Association of Religion Data Archives (relying on World Christian Encyclopedia) there were about 80 Baháʼís in Andorra.

== Early phase ==
=== ʻAbdu'l-Bahá's Tablets of the Divine Plan ===
In the history of the Baháʼí Faith the first mention of Andorra is in the twentieth century. ʻAbdu'l-Bahá, the son of the founder of the religion, wrote a series of letters, or tablets, to the followers of the religion in the United States in 1916-1917; these letters were compiled together in the book titled Tablets of the Divine Plan. The seventh of the tablets was the first to mention several countries in Europe including beyond where ʻAbdu'l-Bahá had visited in 1911-12. Written on April 11, 1916, it was delayed in being presented in the United States until 1919 — after the end of World War I and the Spanish flu. The seventh tablet was translated and presented by Mirza Ahmad Sohrab on April 4, 1919, and published in Star of the West magazine on December 12, 1919.

"In brief, this world-consuming war has set such a conflagration to the hearts that no word can describe it. In all the countries of the world the longing for universal peace is taking possession of the consciousness of men. There is not a soul who does not yearn for concord and peace. A most wonderful state of receptivity is being realized.… Therefore, O ye believers of God! Show ye an effort and after this war spread ye the synopsis of the divine teachings in the British Isles, France, Germany, Austria-Hungary, Russia, Italy, Spain, Belgium, Switzerland, Norway, Sweden, Denmark, Holland, Portugal, Rumania, Serbia, Montenegro, Bulgaria, Greece, Andorra, Liechtenstein, Luxembourg, Monaco, San Marino, Balearic Isles, Corsica, Sardinia, Sicily, Crete, Malta, Iceland, Faroe Islands, Shetland Islands, Hebrides and Orkney Islands."

=== Establishment of the community ===
Starting in 1946, following World War II, Shoghi Effendi, head of the religion after ʻAbdu'l-Bahá, drew up plans for the American (US and Canada) Baháʼí community to send pioneers to Europe; the Baháʼís set up a European Teaching Committee chaired by Edna True. At a follow-up conference in Stockholm in August 1953, Hand of the Cause Dorothy Beecher Baker asked for a Baháʼí to settle in Andorra and French-born William Danjon Dieudonne volunteered. He left his home in Denmark and arrived in on 7 October 1953 and so was listed as a Knight of Baháʼu'lláh thereafter. In 1954, two residents of Andorra, Carmen Tost Xifre de Mingorance and her husband, Jose Mingorance Fernandez, joined the religion.

According to the biography at Radio Andorra, in July 1955 Danjon was hired by Radio Andorra, where he worked under a pseudonym on air: Michel Avril. Michael is his middle name and Avril is the month of birth (April). He did not hide that he had come to promote the religion. In May 1963 Danjon left Radio Andorra and became Assistant Secretary of the Syndicat d'Initiatives Valleys of Andorra in Andorra la Vella, then in 1966 became director of the House of Andorra in Paris. Then from 1975 to 1981, he worked at Sud Radio and then joined the Andorran Ministry of Education and Culture until 1989.

== Growth ==
In 1963, statistics on the community listed a registered group (less than 9 Baháʼís) in Andorra-la-Vella. A Baháʼí Local Spiritual Assembly is noted in 1979 - as well as Baháʼís living in a total of 3 locations in Andorra.

In 2003, the Andorran government co-sponsored a resolution passed by the third Committee of the United Nations General Assembly which expressed "serious concern" over continuing violations of human rights in Iran and mentioned specifically "continuing discrimination" against Baha'is and other religious minorities.

Second generation Baháʼí Jose Mingorance Tost was chairman of the Local Spiritual Assembly of the Baháʼís of Andorra in 2004 and the secretary is Badi Daemi. Marc Forné Molné, then Head of Government of Andorra, attended a reception before the ceremony for the 50th anniversary of the establishment of a community of the religion in 1954. Regional conferences were called for by the Universal House of Justice, current head of the religion, in October 2008 and one was held for the Iberian peninsula 24–25 January 2009 to celebrate recent achievements in grassroots community-building and to plan their next steps in organizing in their home areas. Among the 1400 attendees were two Bahaʼis who came from Andorra.

=== Demographics ===
In 2005 according to the Association of Religion Data Archives (relying on World Christian Encyclopedia) the Baháʼís amounted to 0.1% or about 80 Baháʼís.

== See also ==
- History of Andorra
- Religion in Andorra
