= Dorothy Beecher Baker =

American Hand of the Cause of the Bahá'í Faith

Dorothy Beecher Baker (December 21, 1898 – January 10, 1954) was an American teacher and prominent member of the Baháʼí Faith. She rose to leadership positions in a Local Spiritual Assembly and then was elected to the National Spiritual Assembly of the religion, serving a total of sixteen years. During World War II, she undertook leadership of the National Assembly's Race Unity Committee and of efforts to expand the religion into Mexico, Central and South America. In December 1951 she was recognized for her service, appointed by Shoghi Effendi, then head of the religion, to the rank of persons known as Hands of the Cause of God.

People of this rank were appointed for life whose main function was to propagate and protect the Baháʼí Faith. Unlike the members of the elected institutions and other appointed institutions in the religion, who serve in those offices, Hands are considered to have achieved a distinguished rank in service to the religion. On 24 December 1951 she was appointed Hand of the Cause of God by Shoghi Effendi.

== Early life ==
Born Dorothy Beecher, she was distantly related to Harriet Beecher Stowe, the American abolitionist and author of Uncle Tom's Cabin (1852). This bestselling book is believed to have influenced the American Civil War.

Beecher at the age of 13 was introduced to the Bahá'í Faith by her grandmother, a member of the religion. Her grandmother took her to New York City to see ʻAbdu'l-Bahá, who was on an extended trip to the West. Moved by his talk and more thinking about the religion, around the time of her 15th birthday, Dorothy took official steps to be recognized as a Baháʼí.

After high school, Beecher attended college at New Jersey State Normal School at Montclair. She graduated in 1918 as a teacher.

== Career, Bahá'i faith, and marriage ==
Beecher started working for the Newark, New Jersey public school system.

In June 1921 she married Frank Baker, a widower with two children, and took his surname. They had a daughter Louisa together in 1922 and a son born in 1923. By 1926 the family had moved to Buffalo, New York, where Baker joined the local Baháʼí community. She became quite active and was elected to the Baháʼí Local Spiritual Assembly.

The family moved to Lima, Ohio in 1927. Continuing to be active as a Baháʼí, in 1928 Baker was a delegate to the national convention. After that she dedicated herself more to the service of the religion. She was first elected to the nine-person National Spiritual Assembly in 1937.

Baker participated in leadership roles in several initiatives of the Baháʼís before World War II. Among the two highest priority were undertaking ʻAbdu'l-Bahá's call through the Tablets of the Divine Plan to spread the religion throughout Central and South America and to address racism in the United States. Baker was named chair of the Inter-America Committee of the Baháʼí National Spiritual Assembly of the US, responsible for many aspects of an initiative to expand the religion into Central and South America.

In 1939 she was appointed by the national assembly to the Race Unity Committee, along with Louis George Gregory, an African-American lawyer who was a strong proponent of the religion. She chaired the committee from 1941 to 1944, during World War II.

She was elected to serve on the Baháʼí National Spiritual Assembly of the United States and Canada; she ultimately served sixteen years with the national assembly.

In addition, she continued work with the Race Unity Committee; it stressed the role of education and culture in uprooting racism, gave parents recommendations for educating their children in the spirit of racial equality, and encouraged the study of African-American culture.

Baker was instrumental in establishing the College Speakers Bureau for the committee on Race Unity. In 1941-2 she visited 30 colleges; in 1942-3 she visited 50 more. Across four years, through this bureau's work, she spoke to more than 60,000 students in 20 states.

From 1937 to 1946, Baker made six trips through Central and South America. Because of her background in speaking to many audiences, Baker was regarded as one of the best Baháʼí speakers in the United States.

Baker's daughter, Louise Baker, pioneered to Colombia in early 1943, working to interest the people in the Baháʼí faith. In 1943 Dorothy spent a month in Colombia visiting her daughter and other Baháʼís. Later in 1945 and again in early 1947, Baker was one of a number of notable Baháʼís who traveled through Mexico, meeting residents along the way.

Starting in 1946, following World War II, Shoghi Effendi drew up plans for the American (US and Canada) Baháʼí community to send pioneers to Europe. Delaying her personal Baháʼí pilgrimage, Baker undertook a trip in 1948 across Europe. She visited Norway, Sweden, Denmark, Holland, Belgium, Luxembourg, Switzerland, Italy, Spain, and Portugal (where she again visited her daughter.) See Baháʼí Faith in Europe.

Baker was a representative of the US National Assembly to the 1951 Bahá'i convention. They were to elect members of a regional assembly to oversee expanding Bahá'i across Mexico and into Central and South America, and to the West Indies.

During a second trip through Europe in 1951, Baker was appointed as a Hand of the Cause by Shoghi Effendi.

== After being named a Hand of the Cause of God ==
Baker attended the second convention of the regional assembly of Latin America which was held in San Jose, Costa Rica in April 1952 - her last journey to the region.

== Death ==
In February 1953 the first inter-continental conference of four designated by Shoghi Effendi took place in Uganda. Baker was on the program along with ʻAlí-Akbar Furútan, Ugo Giachery, Hermann Grossman, ʻAlí-Muhammad Varqá, George Townshend, and Dhikru'llah Khadem giving a wide variety of talks and classes across 7 days. Baker made her Baháʼí pilgrimage just before the conference after delaying it twice in earlier years in order to provide service in her travels.

At a follow-up conference for the initiatives in Europe, in Stockholm in August 1953, Baker asked for a Baháʼí to settle in Andorra and French-born William Danjon Dieudonne volunteered. He left his home in Denmark and arrived in on 7 October 1953 and so was listed as a Knight of Baháʼu'lláh thereafter.

Baker spoke at a variety of events in India extending her stay twice to speak at schools - her last public talk was in Karachi in early 1954. In Karachi she boarded a BOAC flight to London. In January 1954 it was announced Baker had died in a plane crash near the island of Elba en route to Rome from Pakistan where she had toured after helping an international conference in India. The plane, BOAC Flight 781, had taken off at 4:30 a.m., Lima time, Sunday, from Rome, on its way to London, and crashed in the sea about 40 minutes later. She had had plans to continue her trip from Rome to Paris, New York, and from there to a pioneering post with her husband Frank Baker in St. Charles, Grenada, West Indies.

Paul Edmond Haney was appointed Hand of the Cause to replace her in service to the religion.

The major print biography of Dorothy Baker's life was written by her granddaughter, Dorothy Freeman, and researched by her daughter, Louise Baker Mathias -- Mathias, Louise B., ed. (1999) [1984]. From Copper to Gold: The Life of Dorothy Baker. Baháʼí Publishing Trust, USA. p. 320. ISBN 0853981779.
