= Beatrice Irwin =

Actress, poet and designer

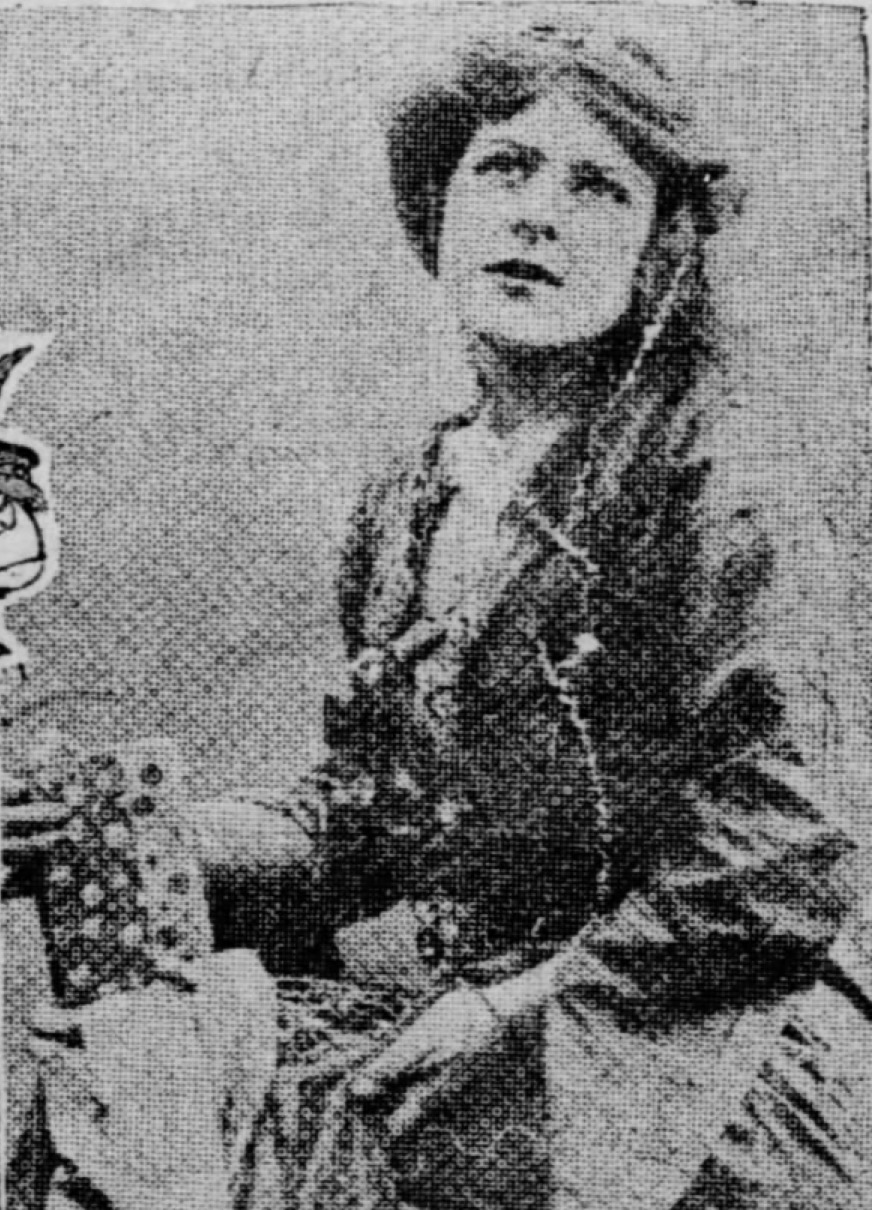
- Born: Alice Beatrice Simpson; July 16, 1877; Dagshai
- Died: March 20, 1953 (aged 75); San Diego
- Occupations: Actress, poet, designer and Baháʼí advocate

Beatrice Irwin (July 16, 1877, Dagshai, India - March 20, 1953, San Diego, California,) was an actress, poet, designer and promoter of the Baháʼí Faith. Born Alice Beatrice Simpson, she took Beatrice Irwin as her stage name and later adopted it as her real name.

After her family moved to Scotland and then to England, she attended Cheltenham Ladies' College where she graduated 1895 and took the Associate in Arts test in which she placed 5th for that year. She went on through a series of careers starting with being an actor in stage theatre which took her to Cape Colony, as it was known then, touring America, briefly in the then young country of Australia, and performed in Shanghai. Next she published a book of poetry and some poems were published in different venues. Neither careers were very successful but some of her work was considered pioneering particularly when she blended them with an intentional use of colored illumination. She met, admired, and was encouraged by, the French sculptor Auguste Rodin. Having had some contact with theosophists before 1910 she then also encountered a Sufi leader, Inayat Khan, and then head of the Baháʼí Faith, ʻAbdu'l-Bahá, a religion she increasingly identified with. Her success with color led to a specialization and burgeoning career she named as an Illuminating Specialist including patenting a specific lighting fixture and writing a text The New Science of Colour partly relating to color psychology. After her Baháʼí pilgrimage in 1930 to see then head of the religion Shoghi Effendi, and his initiation of plans to implement the Tablets of the Divine Plan by ʻAbdu'l-Bahá for which she had already shown actions, she devoted much of her later years to promoting the religion in Central and then South America before going on to Mallorca in her last years before returning to San Diego where she died. While she was increasingly occupied with those endeavors, her work in color, particularly from the New Science of Colour, was taken in with great interest by some Australian artists - Roy de Maistre and most particularly Grace Cossington Smith - though largely from a theosophist understanding.

== Biography ==
=== Early life ===
Beatrice Irwin's maternal grandfather John Hall married Lucy Campbell Hackshaw in 1847. Hall was in the British Army and was a freemason. Their youngest daughter Alice, was born 1852 in what was then called Bombay, India, and she grew up and married Anglican minister Rev. William Simpson, then serving in India, in 1873. Simpson was born in Dublin perhaps 1829 and was thus over 20 years older than Alice. After several previous placements as a minister Simpson applied to serve in India in 1857. Together they served in several locations ultimately in Dagshai, India, in the far north in the border range of mountains before the Himalaya where both daughters were born. This was during the British Raj amidst the period of the Great Famine of 1876–1878 which began in regions to the south and west and spread north. Their second daughter, Alice Beatrice Simpson, later known as Beatrice Irwin, was baptized in nearby Kasauli in August, 1877, born July 16. Around the time of her birth William was appointed to serve in Roorkee, out of the foothills along the Himalayas and then in 1879 he retired though it is not clear where the family lived until they are known in Scotland in 1886 towards the end of the Victorian era with the birth of their last child Arthur John Simpson. In 1888 William came out of retirement to serve a church near Glasgow. In the winter holidays of 1891 they and Lucy Hall were all living in Glasgow. About then Alice Beatrice met Ellen Terry who recommended she consider the theatre after finishing her schooling. William Simpson may have died c. 1894. The family then moved to London and the sisters finished their education at Cheltenham Ladies' College, and lived on investments trusts for the ladies who then bought a house together and all the family lived there.

Mother Alice became a member of the Hermetic Order of the Golden Dawn on 12 July 1895, and advanced a degree in 1899, followed by elder daughter Elaine in 1897 and Beatrice in 1899. Mother Alice met Aleister Crowley after his initiation in 1898. The organization was about to splinter and Crowley's actions involved mother and daughter Elaine, sister to Beatrice, and various expulsions took place in 1900 following which daughter Elaine was to be wed but their communications continued between them.

Meanwhile Beatrice had finished her education at Cheltenham by passing the "Senior Local, or A.A. Examination" for Oxford University held at Cheltenham when she was about 18 years old, which granted her the official title of Associate in Arts from Oxford University, but which was not a degree directly based on attending it. In fact of those who took the exam by the fall of 1895 she placed 5th overall and 65th in English. It remains unknown if she attended further work possibly with St. Hilda's College; Girton is also mentioned as thought of but not tried. But for 1897 she is remarked to have chosen theatre over further college and picked up the stage name "Beatrice Irwin". Perhaps as a beginning of her career Beatrice is visible with her stage name on a boat trip November 1897 from London to Canada. She had definitely entered theatre productions in England and then went to what was then called Cape Colony, a decade or so before becoming the Union of South Africa, under the productions of Henry Irving and Ellen Terry in some comedies and visible there as early as April, 1898, on into November with a good review in August in the play "The Importance of Being Earnest".

=== Theatre ===
Irwin was returned to London by June 1899 in a theatre production. In October she was in the Irving-Terry theatre company from London coming to New York, during the presidency of William McKinley, (before his re-election and subsequent assassination,) performing with a set of plays. Bram Stoker was the company manager. Most of the company and material came over on the steamer Marquette shipping with sets for the suite of plays while a few came on the RMS Etruria. As the company productions moved to Washington, D.C., there were brief positive statements of Irwin's acting. The company continued performances touring into May, 1900. While Irwin was touring America her sister and family moved to Hong Kong. By October in America the company had returned to London and Irwin was acting in another play, "Mrs Dane's Defence” in Wyndham's Theatre. Reviews were somewhat mixed: "Good acting one expects to find at Mr. Wyndham's theatre; and finds. Saving the impossible Scotch accent of Miss Beatrice Irwin, which is less characteristic of Miss Janet Colquhoun's reputed race than her general air of sense and steadiness,…" though her acting was again positively commented on as well. Irwin was also in another play "Still Waters Run Deep" in December. As the Victorian era ended with the death of Queen Victoria and the Edwardian era began, Irwin was in "Mrs. Dane's Defence" staged in London through May, 1901. Many of the Simpson family including Beatrice gathered for the winter of 1901 in London, The play was then staged in New York but Irwin did not perform.

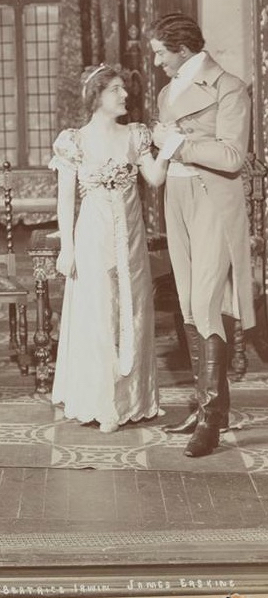
Selection of a photo including Beatrice Irwin in the Garrick Theatre in 1902 for "There's Many a Slip".

In February, 1902, Irwin was in another London play "The New Clown” in London with positive comments of her acting, though by March she was not in the play. She also returned to "Mrs. Dane's Defence" for performances. In July Irwin was noted in a forthcoming work "There's Many a Slip" to be produced by Charles Frohman coming from London to New York to start touring. The play had been staged in London - at the Haymarket Theatre - and there was a picture published of the play including Irwin in the Garrick Theatre. Irwin arrived in America on the SS Philadelphia (as it was called then) in late August. The play continued to make news in September partly with notice of the debut of the Earl of Rosslyn as an actor with positive comment of Irwin's acting by Kate Carew and others. And there were other plays of the troupe. In mid-October came news of Irwin's engagement to James Francis Harry St Clair-Erskine, that Earl of Rosslyn. Early coverage of the betrothal noted Beatrice Irwin was her stage name and her father was the former Rev. William Simpson of Scotland. Rumors of another suitor who left the play at the time also circulated.

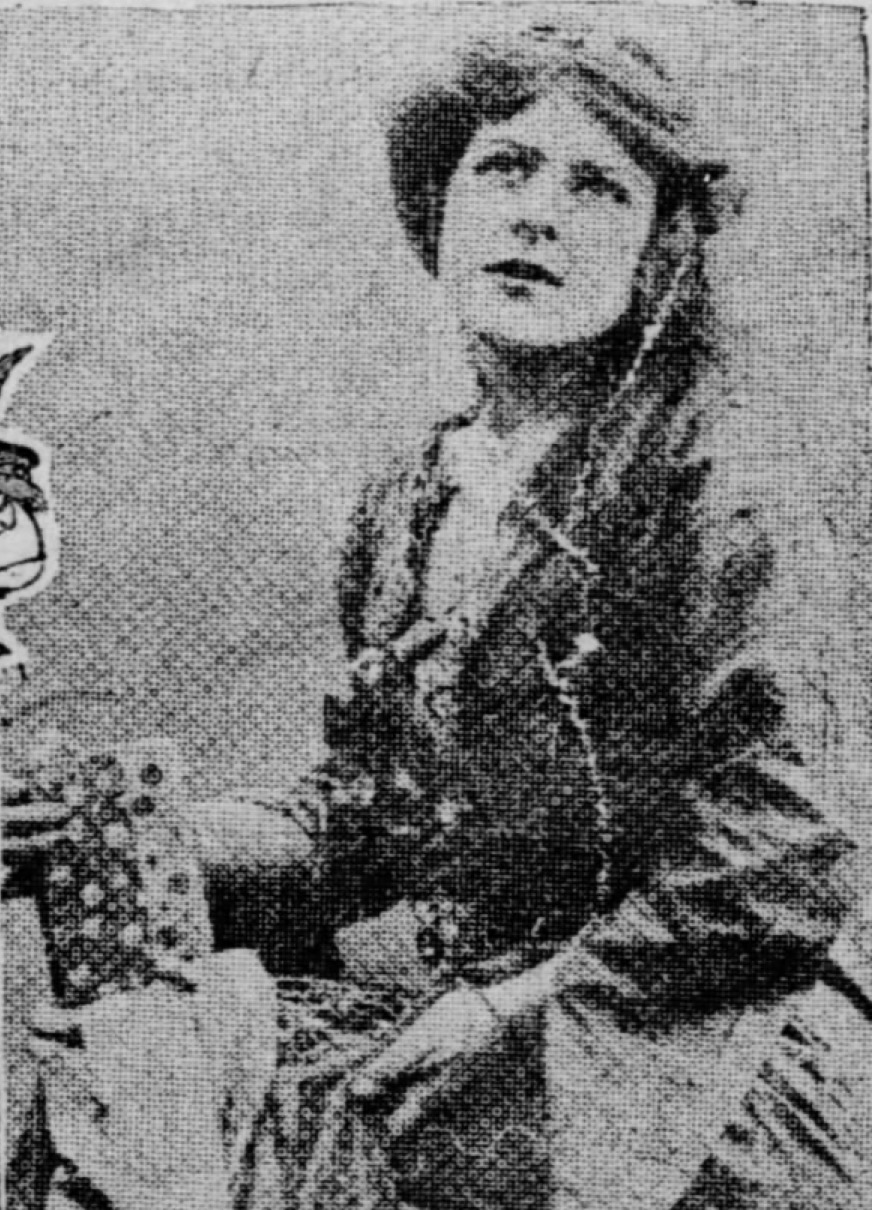
Selection of photo published in The Philadelphia Inquirer Oct 19, 1902 of Beatrice Irwin

News of the betrothal was widespread, and a reception was held. Another play of the time was "His excellency the Governor”. The troupe continued their tour though by November the Earl had left, while praise for the play and positive comment of Irwin continued. There is occasional mention of her as Beatrice Simpson. In December the Earl took a trip on the Etruria from Liverpool back to New York at which time he was looking for another play to be in and said the betrothal was not firm. Meanwhile Beatrice's sister Elaine and her family moved to Shanghai during the year.

In January 1903 Irwin and company returned to New York with the next play - "The Unforeseen” - as part of the Empire Theatre Company, which again Kate Carew liked but was not overly impressed by, though it got a standing ovation, while the company continued touring widely. But news comes in mid-February Irwin resigned from the company and joined a company established by her beau, sometimes it is even said husband, and the first play is "The Young Miss Pettifer”. The company made it into Canada and again Irwin was pictured in the newspaper. Some newspapers were still taking note of the stage name and family. However by mid-March she has declined the betrothal. She immediately left the company and sailed to England/Europe actually leaving just after mid-March, though he soon followed, while word of the engagement was still spreading west. Come August Irwin returned from Europe now in another play “The Admirable Crichton”. There was a break and then the return of Irwin in mid-October, and production of the play resumed. But she fainted twice in productions at the end of 1903 and early 1904, and resigned from the performance in February. In March and April 1905 that Earl announced being wedded to someone else.

Where Irwin was from spring 1904 to spring 1906 is as yet unstated. In later April 1906 Irwin was briefly mentioned seeking information on an Irvine family history from a home in eastern London. In June she is noted in the cast of a jubilee performance for Ellen Terry in London. Again a year passes without detail - until her grandmother Lucy died. News comes that July 1907 of Irwin joining a theatre troupe to perform in the young nation of Australia in the play "Brewster's Millions", and the first performance does take place in mid-September in Sydney. She may well have traveled with her mother. Irwin went on to Melbourne having given some interviews and giving more. It was said from one that this was her first time in Australia, arriving on the RMS Victoria, was fluent in German and French and learning Italian, had some knowledge of Latin and enjoyed horse-riding. She also mentioned being in Paris the previous Christmas (thus late 1906.) About then she also says she has some knowledge of French, German, Chinese and Japanese theatre, (during some trip home to Britain from America via Asia at some point, perhaps in 1904-6) - of which she preferred French first, but also noted the Japanese style favorably. Indeed she actually later claimed to have done a performance in Shanghai, where her sister also lived at the time, during the late Qing dynasty. She also said she preferred plays that were more 'costume and character' though she longed to sing in a Gilbert and Sullivan style comedy, and that she loathed pantomime.

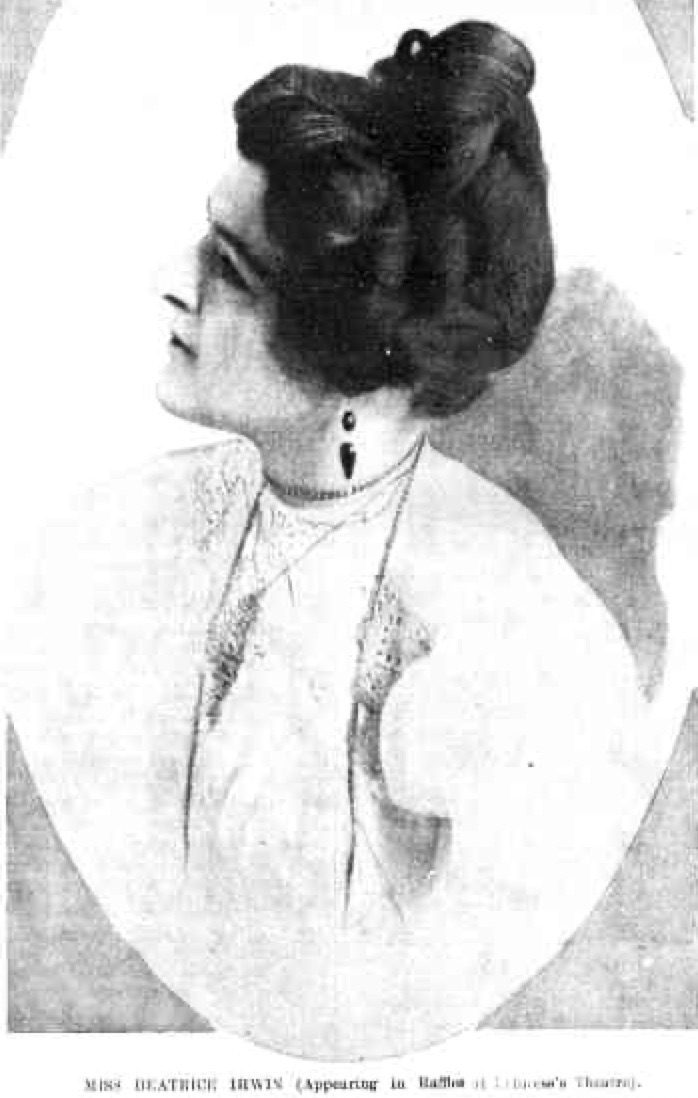
Beatrice Irwin while on tour in Australia, 1907

She had kin in Sydney, and her picture was published. Her first performance in Melbourne was positively reviewed, but by early October there rumors of problems, limited roles even if she was judged successful by some and not by others or just publishing her picture. By the end of October it is clear she is ill, by one report a nervous breakdown, or also described as fainting on stage during a performance, sought medical advice, and returned to England in November. Another actress from the same company lasted only a little longer. There is nothing visible of Irwin in 1908 as yet identified and in 1909 the only mention yet found is on a list of professional and stage names. It may be during this time that Charles Webster Leadbeater had an influence on Irwin's future work through his and Annie Besant's 1901 Thought-Forms, reprinted in 1905, that has a chapter "The Meaning of Colours" and several colored paintings and attributed meanings.

=== Poetry and theatre ===
In March, 1910, Irwin makes her first known appearance publishing a poem in America:

Out into the world of men
Let me go;
Love and pity dwell not there -
That I know.
What wouldst find, then, in the world -
Renown?
To its heartbeat Iʼd tune
Mine own

Irwin is again listed in a review of stage names in March in America. Her first poem is soon echoed. This new publicity starts noting her activity when a London literary club elected her an honorary member and hoping to expand its presence in the US. She mentions she is preparing a book of poems of her own. Though clearly starting a literary career by April it is also clear she was also in a new play in New York. She was again interviewed, this time noting her education and recalled meeting Terry. She speaks of having a volume of poems and seeking a publisher, "but few of them have seen the poems, for Miss Irwin is a trifle timid about her new venture." She is noted favorably in a production in the Ben Greet Players at the Garden Theatre from April, while a poem appeared in print in May. After a break over the summer Irwin returns to the newspapers in September with a poem and then in November with mention she will be in the play “The Scarecrow” back in DC in December.

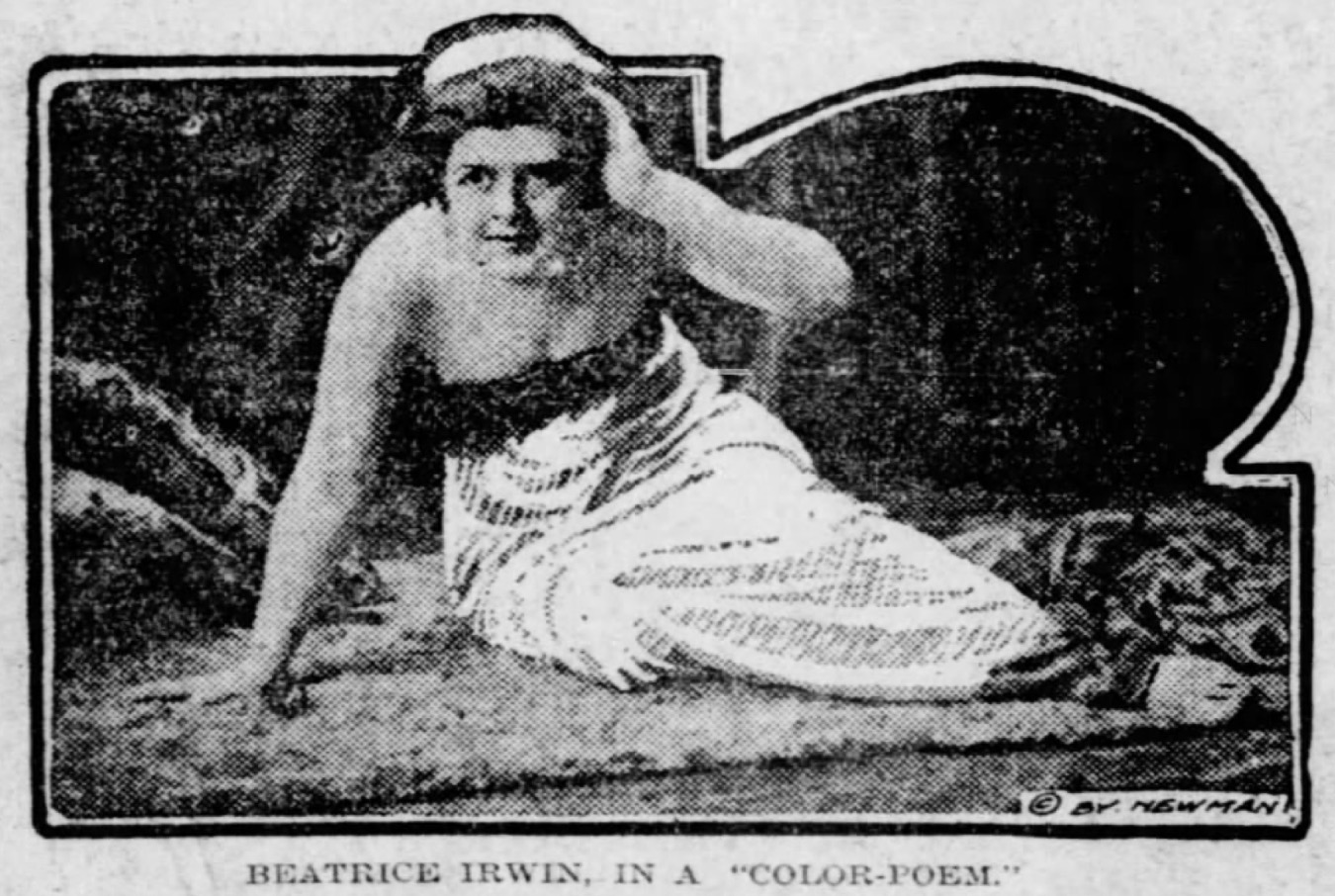
Beatrice Irwin in her "Color Poem" published in newspapers in later 1910.

However, the same week that news is announced, she has a one-woman performance in New York with the quality of color illumination featured as a key part of the performance appearing in perhaps 21 costumes of women from around the world. The most widespread review included a black and white picture and lurid commentary. However Richard Le Gallienne wrote a favorable defense of her performance piece in a letter to the editor of the New York Times. He also revealed he has reviewed Irwin's forthcoming book of poetry.

=== Baháʼí Faith ===
Timed with Irwin's coming visibility her mother Alice requested the book The Life and Letters of Sir John Hall be published. In January 1911 Irwin was visible still touring with the play troupe in America. She performed into later January, but a few days before February she resigns from the London performance of "The Scarecrow” for reason of illness.

Mention of her poetry surfaces again in May, and October. Amidst this period, ʻAbdu'l-Bahá, then head of the Baháʼí Faith was known in his first journeys to the West and already in communication with theosophical circles while in Britain.

How she became connected with the Baháʼís is unclear. She writes of her second interview with ʻAbdu'l-Bahá:

On this occasion I asked for Abdul-Baha's opinions upon psychic development, which (ed - within her understanding then,) is so essential a feature of Hindu and Sufi philosophies. His reply was guarded, but on the whole he was not in favour of mystic experiments, as he pointed out that, in order to be valuable, such experiments must be profound, and that the practical conditions of life in the West did not usually afford the time and patience necessary to such researches. Again, it was the practical note that dominated the discourse of this Eastern seer, for he insisted that, at the present juncture, general spiritual development was more needed than individual psychic culture, and that those who could grasp and spread the Bahai teachings would be paving the way to conditions whose outcome will be the universal psychic unfoldment towards which humanity is trending.

ʻAbdu'l-Bahá was in Paris August to December, 1911. By December she is credited with being in audience of presentations of ʻAbdu'l-Bahá in Paris. She was described by early Baháʼí Laura Clifford Barney saying: "Beatrice Irwin, a blond, young intellectual, had come to Paris to study her profession…. She had an unusual gift for color and for the use of light and shadow…. To her, beauty was an expression of spirituality. When ʻAbdu'l-Baha came to stay in Paris he held small gatherings…. Beatrice Irwin was often present." Many years later Irwin recalled how she spent six months with ʻAbdu'l-Bahá in Paris, "privileged to meet Him daily. .. and to marvel at the universality of His knowledge... and the breadth and depth of His sympathy with the realities of existence." Irwin is called a Baháʼí by Robert Stockman by 1912 and others.

==== Writing ====
In January, 1912, Irwin published her book of poetry as Pagan Trinity and it was advertised in Britain. It has sections "Plastic poems", "Colour poems", "Tone Poems", "The Music of Japan", and "Songs of the Elements".

She also then worked with Inayat Khan - a Sufi leader. He credits her with introducing him to literary circles “at Monico by the Port's Club… (and) Lord Dunsany… who was very much interested in the symbology of Sufi poetry.” She, in turn, referenced Sufi ideas about color in 1915 saying "the Persian Sufis had four 'Schools of Color,' in which they developed their perceptions. Gold was devoted to development through the understanding of beauty, green was dedicated to piety, black to intellect and wisdom, white to ecstasy and inspiration. So, through varying ages and lands, we find man possessing a subconscious and a conscious knowledge of the value of color, and modern science is daily proving the truth of the ancient hermetic teachings." This also may be when she worked with Axel Wachtmeister, a Swedish composer who was living in Paris, on some projects in a Theosophical light including the lyrics she wrote for a work of his published in 1914. Irwin mentions "I have also met a composer who has entered into the color thought in relation to music, and with whom I have collaborated on as score which is now complete"(ed: by 1915).

In February a poem "L'Éternelle Idole" of Irwin's was published in a French newspaper in early 1912:

O comble neigeux de mon désir,
Eternelle Aube que je respire,
Je suis ton soleil.

Je cherche lon sein aveugle de joie
Tu es le repos. Inspire-moi
Mon surprême réveil!

Laisse-toi te fondre sous ma chaleur
Eteins ma fievre dans ta pâleur

Terrestre merveille

In April Pagan Trinity was also available in New York. She dedicated it to Auguste Rodin and included several poems about Rodin pieces and was reviewed in a number of literary venues with mixed appreciation. She had met Rodin at some point, perhaps c. 1910–1912, in a spring day, of which she wrote after his death.

While that news coverage was proceeding she was in a play through John Lane “Four New Stars” production with "The Shadow of Power", "Hector Graeme" and the "Story of a Ploughboy". Then she reprised her Color Poem performance in London in May, also relating her book. That performance is followed by another this time with harp accompaniment and that gives rise to another performance and indeed a few are done into June. There is a reference to a brief negative review of her performance originally in June, 1912.

The year closes with a review of her book of poems in the Occult Review.

==== 1913 with ʻAbdu'l-Bahá in Paris ====
Early in 1913 ʻAbdu'l-Bahá returned to Europe and spoke with theosophist-connected painter John Duncan while in Scotland. Irwin is known to have visited with him in London in late January, 1913. Early Baháʼí Fanny Knobloch remembered Irwin in 1913 in Paris among 80 present at a talk of his first translated by Hippolyte Dreyfus into French and then ʻAbdu'l-Bahá asked spontaneously the surprised Irwin to present the translation in English for the Americans present. She was daily with ʻAbdu'l-Bahá from March 23. He had been there from late January for a couple months. Irwin herself wrote about the Baháʼís the following November in Occult Review. The article summarizes Bábí-Baháʼí history, refers to Laura Clifford Barney's work and the early magazine produced in the West called Star of the West, the start of building the House of Worship near Chicago, Baháʼí communities that met often in London and Paris, of ʻAbdu'l-Bahá and the trips and her earlier visit with him. She then went on to do a review of the teachings and literature of the religion as she understood them then. She then reviews, for the audience reading the Occult Review the trends and trials of western mystical encounter:

The West has never known an epoch more fruitful than the present in cults and philosophies for the development of man's psychic powers, and for the explanation of laws which relate the visible to the invisible realities. The first wave of these ethereal inquiries was embodied in the sciences of hypnotism and animal magnetism; these were succeeded by spiritualism with its trickeries, its truths and its sensational phenomena. This somewhat imbalanced manifestation was superseded by the Theosophical movement, which, though not devoid of phenomena, expounded the austere philosophy of the Buddha through its teachings, and through a literature which is considerable and full of interest.

Then followed the Psychical Research Society, which aims at testing and verifying psychic progress along scientific lines. One might almost call the New Thought, Higher Thought, and Christian Science movements the practical aftermath of hypnotism, spiritualism, and theosophy, since these latest, and essentially practical, western cults have concerned themselves with the tangible results of occult force upon the material plane.

Along with these movements there came to us, from the East, an influx of Yogi philosophers, who taught that the secret of truth and psychic development lay in the science of breathing after certain methods of which they had the knowledge. And so we find the Bahai[sic] Movement coming to the West amidst a veritable Babel of beliefs! The rapid succession and diversity of these various movements clearly indicates that we are athirst for a wider horizon, for some spiritual certitude that shall have a profound bearing not only upon individual, but upon universal growth and jurisdiction. The conflicting cries of these various cults have left us bewildered and restless. Can the Bahai[sic] Movement give us what we need? Is it, as it were, the root of the tree that we are becoming conscious of, the tree of which these other movements have been but waving branches that have cast a grateful shadow upon the heat and burden of our quest? Since we are clamouring for spiritual certitude and repose, it will do our tired eyes no harm to rest awhile upon the self-poised serenity of this majestic Cause, for it has an outlook that is penetrating and vast enough to answer all our needs.

A letter to the editor responded critiquing her history and tried to distinguish theosophic efforts and those with devotion to Jesus, though the writer credits "The Bahai[sic] movement is undoubtedly ethically valuable, and all its main points are excellent. It is still, as far as one can tell, on a so-called spiritual, which is really a material basis. The leaders may, however, be on a truly spiritual basis. If so, directly they have the key to the miracles of Jesus they will at once begin to get wonderful results themselve." before proceeding on his ideas on the science behind the mystic.

She later said: "Abdul-Baha, the great Persian seer and the present leader of the Bahi(sic) movement, has said that we should live in our bodies as in a crystal case, through which we can see clearly on all sides; but, he pithily adds, 'No one can dust the outside of this case but ourselves!'"

A poem of Irwin's is used in a book Wild honey by Cynthia Stockley published in 1914.

==== War, London, and America; the New Science of Colour ====
In early 1914 Irwin's brother was sent to West Africa, returned in 1915 and was a soldier fighting in Belgium and France but from May 1917 he a gunnery instructor and then in November he was sent to Italy.

A three page letter from ʻAbdu'l-Bahá to Irwin in London in October was published in Star of the West in December 1914 in response to a letter she wrote earlier. It speaks of encouraging her to publish the letter he wrote saying in part about the burgeoning war: "O people!… Hasten ye, hasten ye, perchance ye may become able to extinguish with the water of the new-born ideas of spiritual democracy and celestial freedom, this many-flamed, world-consuming fire, and through your heaven-inspired resolution you may usher in the golden era of international solidarity and world confederation."

A poem was also published during the year. In January 1915 a poem "Lotus" was published in New York state, and another poem of hers was also published in Sacramento in April, and May.

By July 31 she was among several writers invited from wide geographies for a reception in San Francisco. This was followed in October–November by notices that she was giving demonstrations of her studies on the art and science of color at the Norway pavilion of the San Francisco Panama–Pacific International Exposition across 3 days and included promoting her new book The New Science of Color. She won a bronze medal for her presentations. This is the beginning of many presentations and reaching engineers and technicians and marketing people with her work on color technology. By this time she could say she was "Born in India, the nomadic spirit of the Orient is strong in my veins. I have lived in England, America, Africa, China, and France successively, and I have visited Australia, Japan, Germany, Italy, and Belgium, so I can claim fairly an international area of observation."

In 1916 coverage of Irwin's The New Science of Color began first locally following her appearance to the south now in San Diego where she aided in relief fundraising due to a flood, (see Charles Hatfield,) and a poem of hers was included in The Architecture and the Gardens of the San Diego Exposition program of the Panama–California Exposition. National publicity specifically on The New Science of Color occurred in March and carried on into early 1917. Some time between February and November Irwin went to Central America for a time promoting the Baháʼí Faith, in response to some of the early parts of the Tablets of the Divine Plan by ʻAbdu'l-Bahá which had been published about promoting the religion around the world. In June a poem was published and by November she was in Paternson, New Jersey, presenting at a silk convention. Coverage continued sporadically of her work and calling her a "Color Scientist" and of her "… she doesn't merely do the usual things in a different way. Instead she has chosen a whole field of her own", even while some of Irwin's poetry was published in various places. Coverage of Irwin's work on color continued, but she sold her rights to the book in later January, 1917.

==== Old work and new work ====
Her earlier work in “Color Poem” was more often called pioneering in spring 1917 and thereafter. Some of her written poems were published too. She presented at the New York Eclectic Club for women on "Color Hygiene in the home" in mid-February, and by later April advertised for students of her work, and gave a Baháʼí talk about timed with the Baháʼí observance of Ridván. While some coverage of her work associated her book with occultists and clairvoyants others commented about her showing up in the summer technical/engineering meetings, which then became specific applied technologies of hers for which she had applied for patents that were eventually granted refining the technology of Chinese and Japanese colored lanterns. Others picked up her concern about color in the treatments of disease in Britain, as well as further coverage in the news back in California. Irwin debuted her (patent pending) Colour Filter Illumination at the Color Symposium in New York on October 11, 1917, Papers collected for the symposium were later published. And these included a panel of the contributors to share comments about various aspects of the field including Color psychology. In particular there was an exchange between Matthew Luckiesh and Irwin:

- Luckiesh: "… I am quite in accord with Miss Irwin's hopes for the future of color in a field which she has discussed. I have expressed my views regarding this field in my paper and elsewhere but would like to sound a caution. In the first place Miss Irwin appears to believe that she is dealing with a 'new' subject, but, in fact, this aspect of color is perhaps the oldest of all the many aspects in which man has become interested. The first savage who placed a red feather in his hair recognized the impressiveness of color in a slight degree at least. I believe it is well to experiment radically in this direction discussed by Miss Irwin but before some of her conclusions are generally accepted among scientists - the discovers and organizers of facts - more adequate proof must be submitted. I have contended that no more interesting and fruitful field is open to the psychologist than that of color.…"
- Irwin: "I am sorry that Mr. Luckiesh objects to the term 'New Science,' but as I said in my paper it is based upon the fact of specialization in color. In the past we have had generalizations, but my work aims at specialization and I claim that red can be a sedative and a recuperative color as well as a stimulant, by which term only it has been recognized hitherto. This specialization was challenged by physicians in San Francisco who attended my lectures at the International Exposition there, and I was invited to test my claims in the laboratory of Dr. Abrams by means of two instruments, the energeimeter and the pneumograph. I took the nine colors, three reds, three greens, and three blues, respectively called sedatives, recuperatives and stimulants. It was found that the tests justified my classification, and so it is in connection with this specialization that I apply the word 'new' to my work."

In March, 1918, after Rodin's death she had published an article "Rodin as Colourist and Mystic" in a periodical The International Studio, the American edition of The Studio. Irwin wrote of his art experienced partly from her visit to his home, specifically his Man with the Broken Nose, Monument to Balzac, and The Gates of Hell but mentioned others as well, "all massed together in diversity whose underlying unity was overwhelming, complete, the unity of new art, of spiritual beauty.… It is the balanced expression of these seemingly divergent qualities, the saintly fervour and the pagan calm, that constitutes the keynote, the power, the wonder of Rodin's art, and that reveal the man himself as a great pagan mystic." She went on to note her sense of what creativity does: "The materialisation of anything, be it sculpture, poem, song or scientific discovery, in measure the result of the impact of man's consciousness with the universal ether. In other words, the result of vibration, and the accomplished work of art or of science man's remembrance of that vibration, or set of vibrations, which he has experienced vividly. These formless messages of light, or vibration, he then imprisons in the forms that delight our eyes, and which we call works of art.… he (Rodin) translated his perceptions of occult truth so forcefully in many of his works…" She sees his work both in pagan and Christian thinking and herself was encouraged in her work by Rodin whom she quotes saying: "This is certainly a thing that we should study and know more about. Doubtless there are healing and hidden properties in colour." She speculates that wings might be the symbol that most represents the new appreciations in art. Irwin's speaking out for the need of new symbols for new age was quoted at the time, and it has been mentioned many decades later. Meanwhile her work on color also was being picked up by others.

Irwin was a "special lecturer" with the Chalif Normal School of Dancing in New York, (see Louis Harvy Chalif,) since May 1918 and on through December 1919. Irwin also appeared photographed in the Ladies Home Journal in a staged piece entitled "the after-the-war woman in a new field". There was also coverage in San Diego that she had opened a studio in New York, and the repeat of a talk referencing her work was noted too.

In 1919 she noted she had done lighting for a couple events: an unnamed event at the Ritz-Carlton Ballroom and another at the Hotel McAlpin which hosted the Baháʼí Convention using her "Irwin Color Filter System". This would have been the convention that hosted the presentation of the whole set of the Tablets of the Divine Plan to the Baháʼí community in America. Irwin also joined in the mass August letter to ʻAbdu'l-Bahá for a return to America where she is noted from Brooklyn. Her work advancing into the profession of lighting including coverage of her work and another presentation at an Illuminating Engineering Society of North America (IESNA) conference in October.

In January 1920 she attended a reception in her honor in Washington, D.C., by early DC Baháʼí Louise Dixon Boyle, wife of building engineer Eldridge Roger Boyle. Irwin also joined in a women's chapter of the American Association of Engineers meeting in New York at the Cosmos Club in the spring. Later in October she was visible among a select few Baháʼís meeting on the question of the incorporation of the Spiritual Assembly, the local governing unit of the community, in New York. This was held amidst a series of Baháʼí meetings held from December 1920 to October 1922 or so, with among others Mary Hanford Ford. She may have found a kindred spirit on the importance of color, and in general in painting, in Ford as well as a circumstance of community engagement. Ford had joined the religion some 20 years earlier and long been a speaker on paintings and the use of color. Another early American Baháʼí who explored interests in color, and also one using a stage name, was Orcella Rexford. Irwin could have also been aware of or met the early and prominent Baháʼí Lua Getsinger who also had had a profound interest in color. In July a newspaper covered Irwin's color technology.

Meanwhile she wrote an article published in The Occult Review reviewing her own work in the engineering societies, her thoughts on the medical applications of colored illumination, and the importance of it in hospital settings. By late 1920 her book was being promoted on a wider scale and she was presenting light fixture models in The Atlanta Constitution.

==== Baháʼí circles and color demonstration ====
In 1921 her activity in New York in Baháʼí circles is noted a couple of times working with Urbain Ledoux and others, and her book advertised, while she presented "Color Effects in Lighting" to the Buffalo electrical illumination convention and announced a brand of lighting fixtures she was promoting in February which was then covered in a trade journals and newspaper.

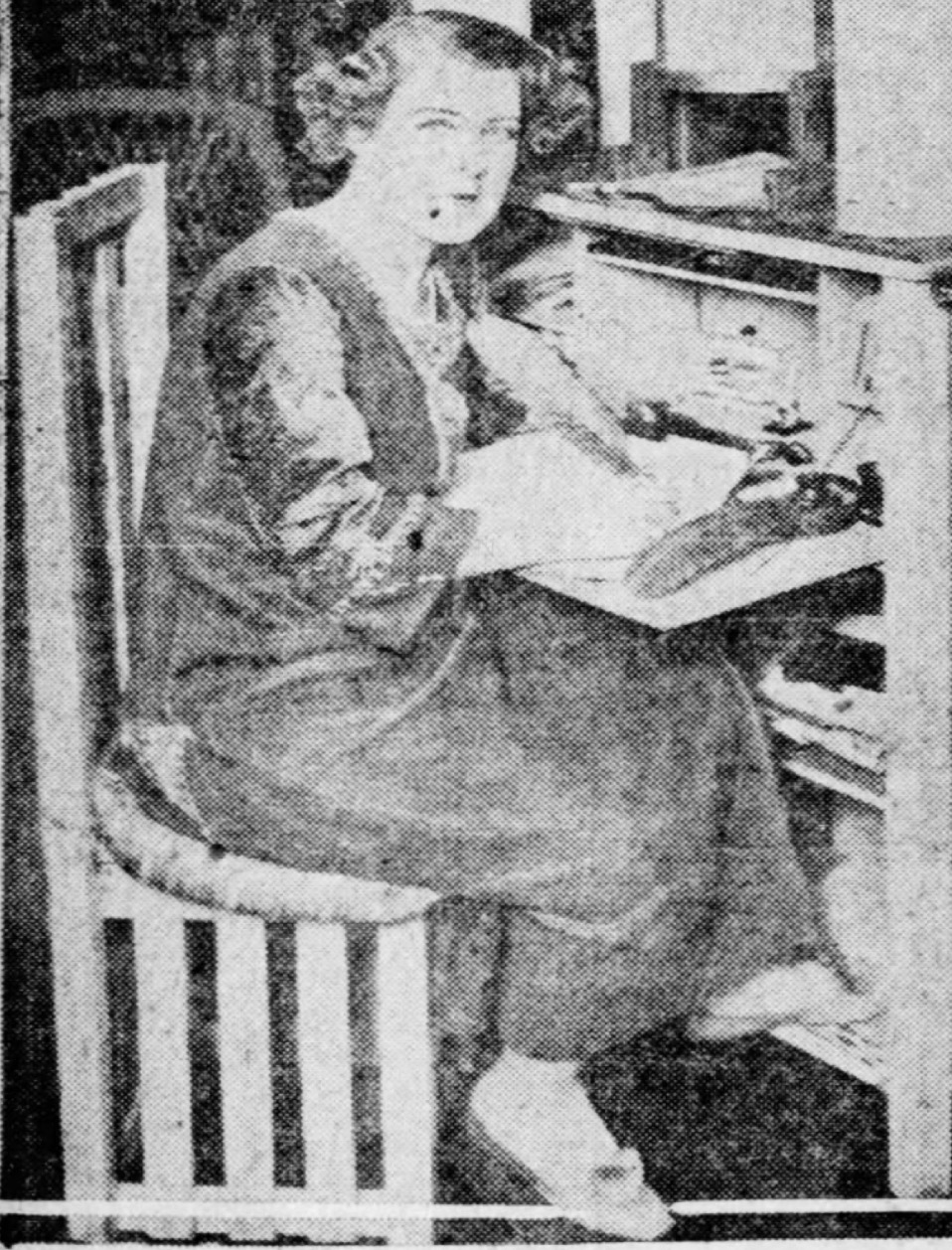
Beatrice Irwin in 1922 as a color expert and member of the Illuminating Engineering Society of North America.

This presentation was noted especially: "For the first time in the history of the Association a convention was addressed by a woman when Miss Beatrice Irwin, an Associate in Arts of Oxford University in England, a member of the IES and the author of several books, one of which is entitled The New Science of Color, spoke on 'Color Effects in Lighting.' Miss Irwin has made a scientific study of all forms of color and is now applying the results of her knowledge to electric lighting. The main features of her talk appear elsewhere in this issue." Irwin was introduced to the convention by William L. Goodwin, a major figure in the National Electric Light Association and the resulting crowd at her demonstrations "elbowed their way" to watch. She was credited with an Associate degree of Arts of Oxford and a Fellow of the Illuminating Engineering Society. Her book New Science was in its fourth edition. Goodwin underscored her work partly because it was a new entry into the discipline and necessarily brought innovation in styles where most practitioners tended to imitate each other. "Miss Irwin's work has reached the point where she now has something definite..." And this kind of coverage was echoed in other trade journals including ones authored by her or quotes from her talk. By 1922 she was publicized as a member of the Illuminating Engineering Society of North America. That and her production of colored light shades was echoed. Amidst that she also continued to present at meetings like in early April 1922 at an opera trust.

That year she also attended some of the later events of Arthur Conan Doyle's work in spiritualism, and a book by the Earl's now divorcé notes his persistence and other qualities. Irwin made reference to giving exhibitions in Paris and would have been later 1922 and into 1923.

In November 1923 Irwin again presented at the IES conference in New York, her approach on the effects of color were again cited in the newspapers, and again in The Occult Review in December.

A collection of letters from ʻAbdu'l-Bahá to Dr. Susan Moody was given to Irwin in later summer 1924. Mention of her "Irwin Color Filter System" had made it to the attention of Wellesley Tudor Pole, another early person with strong Baháʼí and theosophic interests who shared her work with a friend.

On 12 November 1924 Irwin spoke at the founding meeting of the British Electrical Association for Women held at 1 Upper Brook Street, the home of Lady Katharine Parsons, and organised by Caroline Haslett. Attendees were leading figures in the world of engineering and women's organisations, and Irwin is quoted as giving "a delightful picture of the American Labour-saving home" as part of the discussion.

In 1925 she was noted "of Paris" or "of Greece" now returned and come to California where she gave a few talks through the fall and winter, while again a newspaper article reviewed her work in color illumination technology. Her activity in California continued the next couple years with various kinds of receptions and talks she gave either as a writer or on her theme of color and its affects. Amidst the coverage she given a reception in San Francisco area by women's poetry groups.

In 1928 Lord Rosslyn came out with another book himself and briefly mentions Irwin. Meanwhile Irwin exhibited at the Long Beach Pacific Southwest Exposition at which she won a gold medal, had a poem published in a local Long Beach newspaper, and was adding profession consultations in city planning and other performances in California. and on into 1929. A book of hers was contributed to library in Hawaii. Meanwhile she was traveling to Europe where she performed her Colour Poem in the 1929 Barcelona International Exposition which closed in January, 1930.

==== Baháʼí pilgrimage and color illumination ====
Irwin went on Baháʼí pilgrimage to Haifa, then of Mandatory Palestine, in early 1930, of which she wrote in August. She arrived on the original RMS Mauretania, which left New York about February 20, and arrived in Haifa March 10. In her text Gates of Light she includes a picture of the Shrine of the Báb taken in April. She reflected on her time with ʻAbdu'l-Bahá in Paris with "many commands and prophecies on travel" for her which she has seen fulfilled "in unexpected ways and places". She was there 19 days including into April and observed a kind of miracle, as she termed it, of international presence and deeds that created an atmosphere … "a kinship with a larger life, more abstract, and the same time more intimate." She also remarked that some 2500 trees had been added to the landscape plus flowers by donations of pilgrims forming "a new memorial to Death, and an interpretation of its meaning at the portal of larger life and creative growth." Her thoughts were reprised and extended noting six nationalities of visitors and stopped to inquire with her about the gardens and Shrine of the Báb while she sat there reading - Russian, German, Arabs, Turkish, Jewish, and American - in the space of one hour; the place of the Holy Land in the tides of history now including the harbor in the bay being modified by the British. "In spite of modernization and colonialization the Holy Land still exhales an ineffable calm, and the deep gladness of unutterable things. Here the mysteries of spirit and matter mingle, and are poised in a balance that presages a new world order." She then takes up recalling the banishment of Baháʼu'lláh and family and followers to prison in Akka and eventually being granted leniency from prison life because of "his prison life and spirit commands such respect." She highlighted the Ridvan Garden there and noted it as "the first earthly point of liberation for the message of Baháʼu'lláh", the rise of the Shrine of the Báb and, at the time, nine terraced gardens and it attracting diverse religious travelers and tourists. A night view with illumination is included but it is unstated if the picture was hers or with her illumination technology. At the time the three back chambers of the Shrine of the Báb were being worked on. She noted the growth of the gardens under the leadership of Shoghi Effendi, then head of the religion, and the sight towards Akka "running out its white arm of remembrance in the blue distance."

Following her return and writing of her pilgrimage, and before the year was out, she published her next book, The Gates of Light, after July. In it she refers to the Baháʼís directly and includes pictures of two Baháʼí-related installations she did in Haifa. She says:

In the West, we do not consider religion as an integral part of life, probably because our scientific education makes it impossible for us to accept reasonably the dogmatic theories or orthodoxies which narrow men's thirst for the infinite down to their own particular measurements. The message of the Bahai[sic] Revelation which came through the Persian prophet Baha'ullah[sic] (1866) is most in keeping with our modern outlook, since its fundamentals enjoin the union of Religion with science, universal religious tolerance, international parliaments and the absolute equality of men and women.

She had constructed a portable version of the Irwin Colour Filter specifically for use at the Baháʼí Shrines she named "The Gate". She also included an outdoor picture uphill towards the front of the Shrine of the Báb as it stood in April 1930 with lighting she supplied,(though the picture itself as published in the book was black-and-white.) She also speaks of the difficulties of the burgeoning field of illumination saying "I voice the feeling of many comrade and creative engineers when I say that the art of illumination cannot come into robust existence until the Illuminating Specialist is recognized as an independent authority, whose scheme, though co-operative, is based upon a deeper and more detailed study of Colour and Light than architects or decorators usually have time to afford to these subjects. The public is gradually awakening to this fact, though its own limited idea that Architecture and Decoration are fine arts, whereas illumination is a mere mechanical necessity, is largely responsible for the present situation." It was commented on by Hugh Ross Williamson in January 1931 noting Irwin's color illumination technology had been used in “masonic lodges in California, to Bahai[sic] shrines in Palestine, and elsewhere”. In November she was noted in the journal Nature giving a talk for the Electrical Association for Women in New York; she also aided founding a chapter in England.

In February 1931 an article of hers was published in Star of the West entitled "Cooperation - Spiritual and Material". "One of the most revivifying and vitalizing aspects of the Baháʼí Revelation is its presentation of religion as a cooperative liberator into a larger life, a constant invocation to the 'investigation of reality,' and to a fuller self-expression, through the use of the word do rather than the dont which is usually associated with religious ceremonial.… the Báb, Baháʼu'lláh and ʻAbdu'l-Baha (sic), have provided us with a magic lamp of guidance with which to illumine the obscure and arduous road! That lamp is cooperation - material and spiritual…." She derived four corner-points in this cooperation: spiritual cooperation among religions, material cooperation via an international parliament, the cooperation of science and religion, and the equality and cooperation of the sexes rising to being human rights and though the Baháʼí program of action was barely started the world's attempts at cooperation were "achieving no result". She underscored the cooperation of the body, mind, and spirit as each necessary though also that the Baháʼí assemblies and individuals could not avoid the unrest in the world. "… I believe that as intimate a knowledge as possible is essential to the correct basic understanding from which thorough cooperation develops." In later May she took part in the funeral of a Baháʼí in New York, in June is noted returning from London with her home listed in Hollywood, California, in October was in a New York exhibition, and then in the New York Baháʼí Center giving a talk with Martha Root. Irwin was also recalled in early theatre development.

==== Books and lectures ====
A year later the new book The Gates of Light was circulated more in the news, she was giving lectures in California, and around the same time a poem of hers was published in a Sufi periodical. In 1933 some of her work was noted as a co-exhibitor in the "House of Tomorrow", (the Wieboldt-Rostone House,) in 1933 for color filter illumination in the master bedroom, and a brief article on the color green was published in a Sufi periodical, and for the November issue of the American Theosophist Irwin wrote a poem piece in honor of Annie Besant who had died in September.

In March 1934 Irwin was noted giving talks about the Baháʼí House of Worship on radio stations in Chicago, Cleveland and New York across a few weeks, and is noted returned from Bermuda in late February. In April she was giving a Baháʼí talk in Brooklyn. In early May she is noted returning from Bermuda. Irwin was in a list of speakers on the Baháʼí House of Worship in the Chicago area during the year.

In 1935 Irwin's mother who had been chronically and acute ill some time died in January. She was also noted returning to America from the UK in August detailing herself as a writer, of Irish background, born in India, and that her passport had been issued in DC in June 1934. She was noticed in Cleveland in November 1935.

Irwins returned to San Diego in January 1936 giving Baháʼí talks though the first talk's venue was moved. She spoke again that summer. Irwin contributed an article “The modern miracles of Palestine” in Baháʼí World volume 6 published later in 1937. It outlines the condition of Palestine through recent history and the arrival and lives of Baháʼu'lláh and the burgeoning community and takes it up into the 1930s and the transformation of agriculture, turning the Dead Sea into a source of potash and bromine used in products and dyes, industrialization and buildings, universities, the port at Haifa and oil pipelines, doubling populations, electrification and museums.

==== Baháʼí tours ====
However Shoghi Effendi wrote a telegraph cable on May 1, 1936, to the Baháʼí Annual Convention of the United States and Canada, and asked for the systematic implementation of ʻAbdu'l-Bahá's vision from the Tablets of the Divine Plan to begin. In his cable he wrote:

"Appeal to assembled delegates ponder historic appeal voiced by ʻAbdu'l-Bahá in Tablets of the Divine Plan. Urge earnest deliberation with incoming National Assembly to insure its complete fulfillment. First century of Baháʼí Era drawing to a close. Humanity entering outer fringes most perilous stage its existence. Opportunities of present hour unimaginably precious. Would to God every State within American Republic and every Republic in American continent might ere termination of this glorious century embrace the light of the Faith of Baháʼu'lláh and establish structural basis of His World Order."

Following the May 1 cable, another cable came on May 19 calling for permanent pioneers to be established in all the countries of Latin America. The Baháʼí National Spiritual Assembly of the United States and Canada appointed the Inter-America Committee to take charge of the preparations.

In later 1936 Irwin joined in these plans of promulgating the religion first by giving talks on the religion in Southern California and then going on into Mexico. Irwin initially teamed up with Marion Holley, and then left for Mexico near February, 1937, where she was noted by May in Mexico City, and spent some six months. See Baháʼí Faith in Mexico. All this despite not being fluent in Spanish, but at the suggestion of Shoghi Effendi.

While Irwin was in Mexico Shoghi Effendi cabled the 1937 Baháʼí North American Convention advising the convention to prolong their deliberations to permit the delegates and the National Assembly to consult on a plan that would enable Baháʼís to go to Latin America as well as to include the completion of the outer structure of the Baháʼí House of Worship in Wilmette, Illinois. In 1937 the First Seven Year Plan (1937–44), designed by Shoghi Effendi, gave the American Baháʼís the goal of establishing the religion in every country in Latin America. With the spread of American Baháʼís communities and assemblies began to form in 1938 across Latin America. Upon her return from Mexico Irwin gave many presentations on the religion through the summer highlighting Mexico, and wrote an article "Mexico's peace-poet and king" published in the Baháʼí magazine World Order lauding Nezahualcoyotl and the native preservation of arts against mass production however much the town of Texcoco was itself plain. She mentioned having visited in June and then on into the more beautiful Texcotzingo. Then she quotes a translated native poem found which she compared to the Psalms of David and chants of Akhnaton.

She also extended talking of Mexico starting in January 1938 into April in San Francisco. She remained in the area giving talks as well as writing articles, amidst which she also published a booklet Heralds of Peace. A reviewer in San Francisco called it "a melange of brief essays and verse on the general subject of peace as illuminated by the teachings of the Persian, Abdul Baha[sic]." But the reviewer is confused by Irwin's use of the term "planetary issues" which, according to the reviewer. she linked to horoscopes. "Just the same, the author is honest in her desire that more people think about peace and stop thinking about war, and sincere in her belief that somehow this might help things." Irwin went to the Baháʼí Summer School at Geyserville in later June, which was the establishment before the Bosch Baháʼí School. A poem she wrote about the Báb was published in World Order that summer as well, while another was published in a Missouri newspaper. She had also taken the opportunity around then to visit several California cities, going back to London in August during which point she was interviewed by BBC Radio where she was able to comment about the Baháʼí Temple, before returning to the US in mid-November. In December she began giving monthly talks at the Brooklyn Baháʼí Center starting in December, then January, and then in March, before writing another article for World Order on peace, where she writes about the perception of peace being a pattern in order to becoming a soul-based perception and a needed universalism and not just one of externalities while the world was suffering from its lack. Meanwhile she traveled around in New England, the Wilmette area, and then back to California, where she arrived by November and gave a talk on Mexico.

In October 1940 Irwin was in Albuquerque with a model of the Temple giving a talk, and was soon visible in several California cities. In later December she was visible in back in Phoenix. She managed to visit an Inter-American conference at the University of Southern California in Los Angeles in January, 1941, but largely was in the Phoenix area through December. Meanwhile she was naturalized as a citizen of the US back in March, and her work on Heralds of Peace was among the materials encouraged in a Baháʼí project in the southwest. But in the middle of 1941 she went to Rio de Janeiro in June, returned from Santos in early October, and wrote about her visit. It is known she visited with Baháʼí pioneer Leonora Armstrong and getting some professional work done. A year later she wrote an article about her experience in Brazil in World Order, speaking of the relatively modern peace seeking civilization of the country and of a period of relatively mild colonialization process. She elaborated she was a traveling "good will correspondent" finding a meeting hall that regularly discussed the ideas of Auguste Comte and spoke with the Oslwaldo Cruz Institute, as it was then called, and though the countryside was to her eyes "poor and backward" it was also "devoid of beggary" and generally the country was at the time "free of tension, suspicion and fear".

She was in Brooklyn in January 1942 where she gave a couple talks, before going to DC reviewing some of her trips with slides. By May she was in Los Angeles for some talks on Baháʼí subjects and meetings into the summer. She also wrote a letter to the editor of the LA Times "North Africa - land of magic" in November. Though starting with mention of the war coverage and trade relations America had with the region and their support for America, it shifts to a tourist experience of modernized cities and ports and especially in Morocco and generally of French influence. Meanwhile Irwin contributed a poem on the Báb to volume 8 of The Baháʼí World, another in honor of Martha Root, was credited as an American contributing to the efforts of the Baháʼís in England, and she contributed an article entitled The New Citizenship. She observes that citizenship was "of the man who would subordinate his personal interests and welfare to that of the community. The citizen, then, was one who through ability and unselfishness built up those cities of antiquity which have bequeathed their rich legacies of education, culture and morality to our day," reviews samples of the forms of citizenship through the ages and then says "With pain man has renounced many physical, mental and moral limitations, and now we stand at a transcendent moment in history, when the patriotism of lands is being expanded into a patriotism of humanity, when man is progressing from self-consciousness into that scientific recognition of a unity of life that means soul-consciousness. This state demands the re-birth of both faith and free will, and it is the urgent problem that the present chaos is solving,… the new pattern of citizenship proclaimed by Baha'u'llah contain the seeds of a spiritual democracy…."

She was then visible giving talks in the Los Angeles area in the spring of 1943 and later summer about her international travels or with Baháʼís. Noting that travel was limited during war time, she appeared again there in February 1944. She also contributed to and commented on in several parts of Baháʼí World volume 9.

In 1945 Irwin's poem "Day of God" was published in the February edition of World Order, while she was in the Los Angeles area giving a talk. She took part in the effort for the recognitions of the religion with the UN in 1945.

She was visible again in Los Angeles in April a year later. Her article "The New Civilization" was published in World Order the same time. During the year she is known to have consulted with the committee managing the Baháʼí House of Worship at Wilmette. By mid-January 1947 she was visible in Los Angeles again.

A year later in late 1948 Irwin is noted in Tunis and headed to Marseilles amidst which she had already held several weekly meetings and radio broadcasts and an assembly elected by early 1949. The initiative was due to a suggestion of Shoghi Effendi. A picture of the assembly of Tunis was published in June. Irwin returned to America arriving in Long Beach California by July where she gave a couple talks starting on her book "Heralds of Peace" and mentioning her recent travels, and then on "What are the requisites of a new civilization?". Irwin's trip and work as reported from Long Beach was included in a reactionary feeling of threat about world government in an October article in New Mexico a year later. Then she was back to take part in a November regional meeting in the LA area noting the growth of pre-assembly communities, and herself spoke at a meeting by early December. Amidst these activities her work on color and demonstrations years earlier was remembered. Meanwhile she gave a talk at the Baháʼí House of Worship in early September. A couple weeks later she was in Sydney giving a talk for the religion.

In July 1951 she gave a talk at an art gallery and it was noted she had a private collection part of which she loaned for an exhibition in Los Angeles, (and the news coverage mentioned her grandparents Sir John and Lady Hall. She was back in Tucson, Arizona, through most of January of the new year, and then in March back in California over in Santa Cruz.

In October and into November 1953 she was visible in San Diego giving several talks. In January 1954 she spoke for a garden club about "Famous garden around the world" which she repeated in February, when her work on color was recalled in Hawaii. She observed Naw Ruz in San Diego contributing a talk with color slides of Baháʼí Temples, Shrines and Gardens. Later that year she pioneered to Mallorca.

=== Death ===
Irwin died in 1956 in San Diego. "Grieved passing steadfast devoted indefatigable promoter Faith. Reward assured Kingdom. Praying progress soul." was the telegram from Shoghi Effendi to the National Spiritual Assembly of the Baháʼís of the United States dated March 23, 1956. Some lost track of her in Spain. The Baháʼís published a biography of her in 1970.

== Review and commentary ==
=== Reprints ===
Irwin's work on the importance of color has been picked up by the artist community at least from the 1950s.

In Baháʼí circles, the opening poem of chapter 12 of Hasan Balyuzi's 1973 biography of the Báb has a poem of Irwin's, and it's been repeated. Irwin was mentioned in a French language book on the history of the Baháʼí Faith in Spain from the 1990s.

In addition for her commentary on Rodin being recalled, her pioneering theatrical work was recalled in 2009. And Irwin's words on color resonated to the point they were worth repeating in audio book form for artist Sue Anderson and published by Librivox.

=== Australian art ===
From at least 2005 a number of publications have picked up Irwin's effect on Australian art. It begins with the interests of Australian academics Deborah Hart and Jenny McFarlane. In 2006 McFarlane wrote a PhD dissertation with extensive review of Irwin's effect on Australian art. In 2008 some symposium papers were presented by Hart and McFarlane, where it was published that Deborah Hart traced the source of Australian artist Roy de Maistre thoughts on color to Irwin. In 2009 another Australian academic Andrew McNamara picked up the theme. de Maistre had led a 1919 "Colour in art" exhibition in Australia which also brought in the interests of Charles Webster Leadbeater who had moved to Australia in 1914 and died in 1934. Irwin's New Science of Colour was a significant influence at the exhibition, and de Maistre took notes directly based on it as well.

Australian painter Grace Cossington Smith also was much affected by Irwin in context with de Maistre and others. In 1924 Cossington Smith transcribed Irwin's The New Science of Colour probably from a copy her local library had and was called a mentor of Cossington Smith by McFarlane. McFarlane associates Irwin's ideas on color coming from Theosophy but distinguishes that Irwin was not a member of the British Theosophical Society, though seeing Irwin's use of the word Science in the title as an occult use of the word and not a mainstream one. McFarlane sees some of Cossington Smith's paintings are strongly affected by Irwin's ideas. While Cossington Smith was closely referring to Irwin's work in 1924 it wasn't until 1926 Cossington Smith was visible connecting with Theosophy in Australia. Though Baháʼís in Australia had been connected with theosophical interests, this came later.

In 2011 this theme was picked up by Australian academic Zoe Alderton, and British academic Rev. Jane Shaw.

In 2017 Nicholas Gaskill, recently appointed an Associate Professor of American Literature at Oxford University coming from Rutgers University, called Irwin a kind of Loie Fuller referencing her work The New Science of Color.

== Bibliography ==
- Beatrice Irwin (1912). The Pagan Trinity. London, UK: John Lane the Bodley Head.
- Beatrice Irwin (1915). The New Science of Color. Union Lithograph.
- Beatrice Irwin (1930). The gates of light; a record of progress in the engineering of colour and light. Great Britain and Philadelphia: Mayflower Press, Plymouth (William Brendon & Sons, LTD), and D. McKay. OCLC 702494199.
- Beatrice Irwin (1938). Heralds of peace. Philadelphia. OCLC 44482992.
