= Nur Amalina Che Bakri =

Malaysian physician and social media influencer (born 1987)

Dr. Nur Amalina Che Bakri
- Born: Nur Amalina binti Che Bakri; 7 December 1987 (age 38); Kota Bharu, Kelantan, Malaysia
- Education: University of Edinburgh; University of Cambridge; Imperial College London
- Occupation: Physician
- Spouse: Alexander Charles (m. 2021)
- Children: Arabella Mia

Dr. Nur Amalina binti Che Bakri (born 7 December 1987) is a Malaysian physician and social media influencer. Nur Amalina holds the record of most 1As scored in the Sijil Pelajaran Malaysia, scoring 17 1As in 2004. Nur Amalina Che Bakri was born to Kelantanese parents. Her biological mother and biological father are both of Kelantanese descent, and she was later raised by her stepfather, who is from Johor, Malaysia until she moved to the UK to further her studies. Her mother is a school principal and her father is a civil engineer.

== Education and career ==
She received the most prestigious Kijang Emas Scholarship from Bank Negara Malaysia to study medicine in the United Kingdom, which was awarded to the top 3 SPM students in her year. She did her A-levels at Cheltenham Ladies College in the UK, where she achieved 5As. She graduated as a doctor in July 2013 from the University of Edinburgh. During her time at university, she also studied for an intercalated degree in pharmacology and was awarded a Bachelor of Medical Sciences (Pharmacology).

She worked as a junior doctor (Housemanship) for two years in Cambridge, and simultaneously completed her Master of Philosophy (MPhil) in translational medicine and therapeutics (TMAT) at Newnham College, the University of Cambridge. After completing her master's degree in mid-2015, she continued her stint as a specialist trainee surgeon at the Imperial College Healthcare NHS Trust. Her specialisations are general surgery and trauma/emergency. At the same time, she worked at St Mary's Hospital, Royal London Hospital, Chelsea and Westminster Hospital and Charing Cross Hospital. She is currently doing her PhD in medicine at the Department of Surgery and Cancer, Imperial College London with a fellowship from Imperial College London and funding from the National Institute for Health and Care Research (NIHR). While doing her PhD, she also works in a London hospital. She was awarded 'Highly Commended' in the Professions category at the UK Women of the Future Award 2021.

As of 2019, Nur Amalina had over 300,000 followers each on Twitter and Instagram. According to the New Straits Times, "Through her Twitter account @dramalinabakri, she is known for her outspoken views on a wide range of subjects, especially on women’s rights and dubious medical practices." It also noted that she had used her social media presence to elicit support for causes such as fundraising for cancer surgery.

By 2022, Nur Amalina had nearly 825,000 followers on Twitter. In December 2022, responding to questions from followers on Instagram after the birth of her daughter, Nur Amalina mentioned that her daughter would not be undergoing female circumcision as it is prohibited in the United Kingdom. This prompted criticism from Malaysian social media users, which reportedly "also included sexualised remarks about the infant." According to press reports, female circumcision "is commonly practised in Malaysia, where there are no laws against it." In response, Nur Amalina stated her lawyers had issued a legal demand to tabloids that had published the remarks in question to retract their publication and make a public apology. She also called for anti-cyberbullying legislation.

== Personal life ==
She married Englishman Alexander on March 31, 2021 at the London Central Mosque. In October 2022, her first child Arabella Mia, a daughter, was born.
