= Eve Jardine-Young =

British educator (born 1972)

- Born: 1972 (age 53–54); Malawi
- Occupation: headteacher
- Employer: Cheltenham Ladies' College

Eve Jardine-Young (born 1972) was born and raised in Malawi. She studied engineering at Cambridge before entering education. She became the DL after becoming the Principal of the Cheltenham Ladies' College.

== Early life ==
Jardine-Young was born in August 1972 and raised in Malawi, and was educated there at Saint Andrews International High School until 1989, when she accepted a scholarship to the Cheltenham Ladies' College for Sixth Form. After she left school, she studied engineering at Pembroke College, Cambridge.

== Career ==
Having worked in industry for a little while, she then entered the teaching profession, beginning at Radley College in Oxford, later moving to Epsom College in Surrey where she taught Economics. In 2005, she moved to Blundell's School in Devon, where she was Director of Studies for six years. She became Principal of Cheltenham Ladies' College in 2010.

Jardine-Young, concerned about stress levels in the students at Cheltenham Ladies' College, advocated the abolition of homework in 2015.

She was appointed as one of the Deputy Lieutenants of Gloucestershire in 2017.
