= Baháʼí Faith in Mexico =

The Baháʼí Faith in Mexico begins with visits of Baháʼís before 1916. In 1919 letters from the head of the religion, ʻAbdu'l-Bahá, were published mentioning Mexico as one of the places Baháʼís should take the religion to. Following further pioneers moving there and making contacts the first Mexican to join the religion was in 1937, followed quickly by the first Baháʼí Local Spiritual Assembly of all Latin America being elected in 1938. With continued growth the National Spiritual Assembly was first elected in 1961. The Association of Religion Data Archives (relying on World Christian Encyclopedia) estimated almost 37,900 Baháʼís in 2005.

== Prelude ==
Several Baháʼís from the United States made trips to Mexico to introduce the religion before 1916, including Mr. and Mrs. Frankland, Mark Tobey and Roy Wilhelm.

=== ʻAbdu'l-Bahá's Tablets of the Divine Plan ===
ʻAbdu'l-Bahá, then head of the religion, wrote a series of letters, or tablets, to the followers of the religion in the United States in 1916–1917; these letters were compiled together in the book Tablets of the Divine Plan. The sixth of the tablets was the first to mention Latin American regions and was written on 8 April 1916, but was delayed in being presented in the United States until 1919—after the end of the First World War and the Spanish flu. The sixth tablet was translated and presented by Mirza Ahmad Sohrab on 4 April 1919, and published in Star of the West magazine on 12 December 1919. After mentioning the need for the message of the religion to visit the Latin American countries ʻAbdu'l-Bahá continues:

... becoming severed from rest and composure of the world, [they] may arise and travel throughout Alaska, the republic of Mexico, and south of Mexico in the Central American republics, such as Guatemala, Honduras, El Salvador, Nicaragua, Costa Rica, Panama and Belize...

Following the Tablets and about the time of ʻAbdu'l-Bahá's passing in 1921, a few other Baháʼís began moving to Latin America.

=== Seven Year Plan and succeeding decades ===
In April 1936 Orcella Rexford traveled to Mexico presenting the religion to various contacts on issues like the Baháʼí view of world peace. Shoghi Effendi, who was named ʻAbdu'l-Bahá's successor, wrote a cable on 1 May 1936 to the Baháʼí Annual Convention of the United States and Canada, and asked for the systematic implementation of ʻAbdu'l-Bahá's vision to begin. In his cable he wrote:

"Appeal to assembled delegates ponder historic appeal voiced by ʻAbdu'l-Bahá in Tablets of the Divine Plan. Urge earnest deliberation with incoming National Assembly to insure its complete fulfillment. First century of Baháʼí Era drawing to a close. Humanity entering outer fringes most perilous stage its existence. Opportunities of present hour unimaginably precious. Would to God every State within American Republic and every Republic in American continent might ere termination of this glorious century embrace the light of the Faith of Baháʼu'lláh and establish structural basis of His World Order."

Following the 1 May cable, another cable from Shoghi Effendi came on 19 May calling for permanent pioneers to be established in all the countries of Latin America. The Baháʼí National Spiritual Assembly of the United States and Canada appointed the Inter–America Committee to take charge of the preparations. During the 1937 Baháʼí North American Convention, Shoghi Effendi cabled advising the convention to prolong their deliberations to permit the delegates and the National Assembly to consult on a plan that would enable Baháʼís to go to Latin America as well as to include the completion of the outer structure of the Baháʼí House of Worship in Wilmette, Illinois. In 1937 the First Seven Year Plan (1937–44), which was an international plan designed by Shoghi Effendi, gave the American Baháʼís the goal of establishing the Baháʼí Faith in every country in Latin America. With the spread of American Baháʼís communities and assemblies began to form in 1938 across Latin America.

== Early history ==
=== First assembly ===
Following travels by Frances Stewart and others like Beatrice Irwin the first person to declare their belief in the religion in Mexico was Maria del Refugio Ochoa of Mexico City in 1937. A group that believed that a new messenger of God was about to appear or had appeared was contacted. Among the early topics of discussion was world peace and Tahirih. The entire group joined the religion and formed the first Baháʼí Local Spiritual Assembly in Latin America in 1938. Among the early work of the assembly was translating Baháʼí literature. Its officers were Pedro Andres Basurto, Maria Luisa B de Jurado, and Zenaida Jurad. It was noted as early as May 1938 that once formed as an assembly it was not under the jurisdiction of the national assembly of the United States. The assembly was invited to attend the US national convention to facilitate communication and consult about the progress of the religion in the region. They sent a representative. A monthly magazine, Emir, published in Mexico Citv, carried a story "Un Nuevo Mensaje Espiritual Nos Ilega de Oriente", before April 1939 presenting the religion directly and reproducing a picture of the US Baháʼí House of Worship and of the members of the assembly in Mexico City. The assembly pursued legal recognition in spring 1939 as well as establishing classes the winter of 1938–9. In the early spring of 1940 it began publishing its own newsletter – Novedades Baháʼís – which began with a 6-page article delineating the brief history of the community and its activities. Mexicans outside Mexico also encountered the religion. In 1940 four Mexicans were part of an observance in Costa Rica for the death of May Maxwell. After starting plans in January 1941 for a radio broadcast by Ford covering Central and South America the broadcast was successfully accomplished 26 November 1941. Meanwhile, a Pedro Espinosa is noted from Mexico City talking at the Baháʼí Center in New York in June 1943.

By 1942 another assembly had been elected in the town of Puebla though it failed to re–elect in 1943.

=== Regional developments ===
An All–American Convention, that is to say North and South, for the Baháʼís was held in 1944 with Carlos Vergara as the delegate from Mexico.

A number of notable Baháʼí individuals traveled though visiting starting in early 1945: Juliet Thompson early 1945 for a year, Dorothy Beecher Baker, then chair of the Inter–America Committee, in later 1945 and again early 1947, Amelia Collins early 1946 and Mason Remey in early 1947. Later most of these were appointed as Hands of the Cause a distinctive station in the religion. Dorothy Baker's daughter toured Mexico several times and helped refound the assembly of Pueblo that failed re–election previously as well as another in Coatepec. Charles Ioas and Amoz Gibson, later a members of the Universal House of Justice, served in the community for a time as well.

In January 1947 Panama City hosted the first congress of the northern Latin America countries to build a new consciousness of unity among the Baháʼís of Central America, Mexico and the West Indies to focus energies for the election of a regional national assembly. Regional committees were appointed overseeing Panama, Mexico, and Nicaragua. Its members were Josi Antonio Bonilla, Marcia Steward, Natalia Chávez, Gerardo Vega, and Oscar Castro. Retrospectively, a stated purpose for the committee was to facilitate a shift in the balance of roles from North American guidance and Latin cooperation to Latin guidance and North American cooperation. The process was well underway by 1950 and was to be enforced about 1953. In 1948 several of the committee and others traveled extensively through the region visiting Baháʼí communities and various regional conferences – one hosted in Mexico City in 1948 – and temporary schools. In 1950 the committee coordinated a series of classes for itinerant Baháʼís visiting and teachings classes among the communities along with close coordination of their services.

A regional National Spiritual Assembly for Central America, Mexico and the Antilles was then elected in 1951 attended by Dorothy Baker and Horace Holley serving as special representatives. The convention hosted 25 delegates from Panama, Costa Rica, Nicaragua, Honduras, El Salvador, Guatemala, Mexico, Cuba, Haiti, the Dominican Republic, Puerto Rico and Jamaica. Following the election a letter of the regional assembly noted that "Considerable attention is being paid to stressing the need throughout the area of a much greater understanding of the administration of the religion. Local assemblies are being taught, by means of the National Teaching Committee and the Baha'i Bulletin to acquire a much higher concept of their own importance as governing bodies. They are being groomed slowly but surely to realize that they are not merely groups of nine people gathered together in a purely spiritual unity, but nine members of a governing body, gathered together to maintain order and peace in their own communities, resolve their problems through the medium of prayer and consultation and to devise efficient ways and means of spreading the Faith in the territory under their immediate jurisdiction." The 1952 members were Raquel Constante, Cora Oliver, James Facey, Elena Marella, Artemus Lamb, Louise Caswell, Zenayda Jurado, David Escalante, and Randolph Fitz–Henley. 1955's convention was held in Mexico City with 27 delegates, 16 of whom attended. During this time Auxiliary Board members, assistants to Hands of the Cause at the time, carried on a campaign of visiting many communities with many pioneers still being coordinated by the regional assembly. The first assembly of Monterrey formed in 1956. In July 1956 the first Mexican conference was held about issues specific to Mexico about the promulgation of the religion.

The regional assembly was reorganized in April 1957 with Mexico joining with the Republics of Central America: Panama, Costa Rica, Nicaragua, Honduras, El Salvador, and Guatemala. In attendance representing the head of the religion, Shoghi Effendi, was Hand of the Cause Dhikru'llah Khadem with 27 delegates from the various countries as well as representative of various institutions. In 1958 there were 50 delegates at the election of the regional assembly. Coordinated efforts were made in 1959 to celebrate United Nations Day and the first assembly of San Miguel de Allende in Guanajuato was formed. In 1959 the first public meeting on the religion in Mexico took place in Guadalajara. The meeting was covered by the local news. The 1960 convention was attended by Hand of the Cause William Sears.

In 1961 Mexican Baháʼís elected their own National Spiritual Assembly with Hand of the Cause Paul Haney overseeing the proceedings. Its members were Samuel Burafato, Dr. Edris Rice–Wray, Valeria Nichols, Carmen Burafato, Harold Murray, Florence Mayberry, Anna Howard, Chappie Angulo, Earl James Morris.

==== Indian connections ====
In March 1957 the first Indians joining the religion are noted. A committee focused on that need was active by April 1958 in making contacts and translating materials. Baháʼí observers were welcomed at an Inter–American Indian Congress in the city of Guatemala in 1959 thanks to their contacts with local versions of inter–American Indian institutes in the region and included opportunities for sharing native and Spanish translations of Baháʼí pamphlets. In 1961 the Hands of the Cause of the Americas took special note of the spread of the religion among the Indians across the continents noting progress in Mexico among them. The first all–Indian assembly of Mexico was elected in San Rafael Comac near Cholula, Puebla 1960. Hand of the Cause Enoch Olinga visited this assembly of San Rafael in May 1961.

== Formation of a national community ==
In 1963 the members of the National Assembly were elected by 19 delegates from the Mexican community. That year was the first election of the Universal House of Justice and the delegates for the election were the members of the national assemblies. In Mexico they were: Samuel Burrafato, Carmen Burrafatoc, Romeo Guerrac, Anna W. Howard, Florence Mayberry, Earl James Morris, Harold Baldwin Murray, Valeria Lamb Nichols, and Dr. Edris Rice–Wray.

A review done of the world community in 1963 found Mexico had:

- 11 assemblies (including Guadalajara, Mexico City, Monterrey, San Miguel de Allende, San Rafael Comac and Tepic),
- 16 groups (including the cities of Colima, Cuernavaca, and Tarandacuao), and
- 16 other places with isolated individuals.
- At the same time the membership of the community included several Indian peoples – Cora, Maya, Nahuatl speaking Aztecs, and Otomí, as well as contact being establied with the Tlaxcaltec and Yaqui peoples.

In 1964 the religion reached Cozumel and Isla Mujeres. In 1965 Hand of the Cause Ugo Giachery attended the national convention. Its first Mayan member was elected that year – Jorge Coronado – after 3 yrs of work promulgating the religion among the Maya people. The first Yaqui tribe member joined the religion in 1966. Mexican pioneers are noted as pioneering to other countries and other states in Mexico from 1967. Youth from the United States were known to offer a period of service to the Yucatán area including the institute there and accompanied the Auxiliary Board member on many trips. In October there was a major regional conference in Panama at which there was a viewing of a copy of the photograph of Baháʼu'lláh on the highly significant occasion commemorating the centenary of Baháʼu'lláh's writing of the Suriy-i-Mulúk (Tablet to the Kings), which Shoghi Effendi describes as "the most momentous Tablet revealed by Baháʼu'lláh". It also served as a laying of a cornerstone for the first Latin American Baháʼí House of Worship. To this conference there were delegations of various Mexican peoples and institutions. Meanwhile, short term pioneers continued to come to Mexico. Indian actor and documentarian Phil Lucas was among those that lived in Mexico in the 1970s. Baháʼís reached out to various city and state leaders who were presented with Baháʼí literature including the Governor of Yucatan, and the Governor of Oaxaca.

=== Youth ===
In 1970 a Baháʼí club was founded in the Fundación Universidad de las Américas, Puebla which was officially recognized – the first in all Latin America – in 1971. In 1972 traveling speakers on the religion made presentations there. The first international youth conference of Mexico took place in 1973 in Pueblo City with participants from 5 countries swelling to 200 youth. Later in 1975 a series of public concerts by Baháʼí performers at a university of Mérida included audiences of hundreds as well as news coverage. In 1974 teachers and youth from the center at Muna appeared on local television during a winter school on the religion. The first Baháʼí Campus Club at the Autonomous University of Guadalajara, Mexico's School of Medicine was formed in April 1978.

=== Conferences ===
In 1974 the Baháʼís of Mexico were invited to be part of a university panel discussion religion in Mexico which the Continental Counselors Cannen de Burafato and Paul Lucas participated in at the request of the national assembly. As part of International Women's Year in 1975, the Baháʼí International Community participated in the first World Conference on Women, held in Mexico City. Two Baháʼí representatives were officially accredited to attend the Conference and nine representatives attended the NGO (Non-Governmental Organization) Tribune, the parallel meeting for non-governmental organizations in a process which was overseen by the national assembly of Mexico. The delegates were Baháʼí women leaders from around the world and included among them was Dr. Edris Rice–Wray of Mexico. Dr. Helen Elsie Austin was among the delegates in many international women's conferences, including the 1975 International Women's Conference in Mexico City. There was also television coverage and interviews. Meanwhile, several Indian Baháʼís from Mexico participated in a cultural awareness meeting in California for the Baháʼís along with Indians from the United States encouraging a standard of deeds over words be kept along with awareness of the culture of the peoples addressed. In February 1977 a conference looking at promulgating the religion in Mexico also took place in Mérida with more than 2000 Baháʼís attending. One third of the participants were indigenous believers from across Central America 150 of whom were Mayans. Non-Baháʼí family members of the Indians were allowed to fully attend the meeting. Three Hands of the Cause were present – Paul Haney, Rahmatu'lláh Muhájir, and Enoch Olinga, as well as Counsellor Florence Mayberry who had been on the first national assembly of Mexico.

=== Demographics by the late 1970s ===
While there were 11 assemblies in 1963 by 1977 the community reported 141 assemblies had been elected. The 1979 national convention reported 165 assemblies, 602 localities, 45 delegates, and seven Auxiliary Board members for the nation.

=== Beginning of socio-economic development efforts ===
Since its inception in the 1800s in Asia the religion has had involvement in socio-economic development beginning by giving greater freedom to women, promulgating the promotion of female education as a priority concern, and that involvement was given practical expression by creating schools, agricultural coops, and clinics. In Mexico Baháʼí schools began serving community needs as early as 1965 when Baháʼís founded an institute in Muna, Yucatán offering children's classes and adult training by the Baháʼís of the region. In 1970 an institute similar to the one founded in Muna was established in San Rafael Comac. Another institute, damaged in 1973 in a quake, was renovated, expanded and re–opened in 1975. In early 1976 Baháʼí women from many northern Latin American countries including Mexico gathered in El Salvador for a women's conference sponsored by the Continental Counselors of Central America and the event included meetings among the Baháʼís as well as invited non-Baháʼís.

The religion entered a new phase of activity when a message of the Universal House of Justice dated 20 October 1983 was released addressing the world community on the importance of such activities. Baháʼís were urged to seek out ways, compatible with the Baháʼí teachings, in which they could become involved in the social and economic development of the communities in which they lived. Worldwide in 1979 there were 129 officially recognized Baháʼí socio–economic development projects. By 1987, the number of officially recognized development projects had increased to 1482. Aside from continuing the various schools Baháʼí musicians from 14 countries met for an international conference including Charles Wolcott, which served as an exhibition of indigenous dance and music, a memorial to Baháʼís suffering Persecution and an opportunity to toured a local children's hospital, an orphanage, a school and a local theatre to play for children and staff – two traveling musicians joined the religion during the events.

== Modern community ==
Since the 1980s the national community has engaged in a wide variety of venues.

=== International issues ===
Mexican Baháʼís have participated the interfaith Mexican hosting of the Parliament of the World's Religions.

The national government has been generally somewhat supportive of the Baháʼí response to human rights abuses in Iran. In 2001 Mexico abstained; in 2002 it supported the resolution.

The Mexican Baháʼí community was among the respondents of the Special Rapporteur of the UN who had conducted a survey on problems relating to freedom of religion and belief from the standpoint of the curricula and textbooks of primary or elementary and secondary education institutions. The results of such a survey could facilitate the formulation of an international educational strategy to combat all forms of intolerance and of discrimination based on religion or belief, a strategy that could centre on the definition and implementation of a common minimum programme to foster tolerance and non-discrimination.

Mexican Baháʼís participated in a world teleconference commemoration of Human Rights Day before the 2001 World Conference against Racism. The videoconference linked participants in Bogota, Chicago, Geneva, Mexico City, New York, Rome, San Francisco, Santiago and Vienna. Speakers included Mary Robinson, UN High Commissioner for Human Rights; Jyoti Singh, Executive Coordinator of the UN World Conference Against Racism; Techeste Ahderom, Chairman of the NGO (Non-Governmental Organization) Committee on Human Rights and a Baha'i International Community representative to the United Nations; and Pitso Montwedi, Counsellor of the Permanent Mission of South Africa to the UN. It also enabled participants in those cities and on the internet to ask questions and join in the discussion with UN leaders in the work.

=== People ===
==== Indigenous peoples ====
In 1980 two teams of Native American Baháʼís from Alaska, Canada and the United States representing 10 tribes under the nameTrail of Light traveled from the north to the south starting mid June and presented the religion to audiences in Mexico, Belize, Guatemala, Honduras, Panama, Bolivia, Chile, Peru and finally Ecuador. The first Baháʼí of the Totonac people was noted in Veracruz, Mexico before 1983. A 1984–5 continuation of the 'Trail of Light' process brought Mexican indigenous Baháʼís into Veracruz Mexico. In 1988 Mexico was represented at the fifth Continental Indigenous Council among the 400 participants.

==== Youth ====
Mexican youth traveled internationally to support Baháʼí communities including in New Zealand and Brazil. Other youth continue to travel to Mexico, serve and be changed by the engagement.

=== Demographics ===
The Association of Religion Data Archives (relying on World Christian Encyclopedia) estimated that there were almost 37,900 Baháʼís in Mexico in 2005. The national teaching committee indicated in c.2000 that while there was at least some growth in 19 of the states of Mexico most of the growth took place in San Luis Potosí and Yucatán, followed by Guanajuato, Baja California, with some notice in Colima and other states. In 2009 a regional conference held by request of the Universal House of Justice to celebrate recent achievements in grassroots community–building and to plan their next steps in organizing in their home areas. 600 Baháʼís from across Mexico attended the two-day event.

== See also ==
- Religion in Mexico
- History of Mexico
- Baháʼí Faith and Native Americans
