= Violet Brooke-Hunt =

English writer and social worker

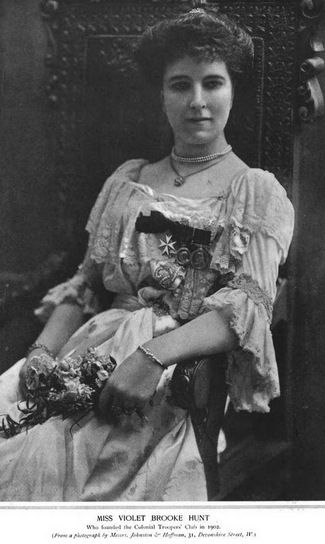
Violet Brooke Hunt, from a 1903 publication.

Violet Edith Gwynllyn Brooke-Hunt (18 June 1870 – 9 June 1910) was an English writer and social worker. She was active in the Boer War, improving conditions for British troops in hospitals and camps.

== Early life ==
Violet Brooke-Hunt was born in Tibberton, Gloucestershire. Her parents were Charles George Hunt, a naval officer, and Gertrude Price Hunt. Violet Brooke-Hunt attended Cheltenham Ladies' College.

== Career ==
Brooke-Hunt already had some community work experience when she moved to London as a young woman. There she continued her work with boys and young men, organizing clubs, sports programs, and vocational classes, and publishing pamphlets. She also published some didactic fiction through the Society for Promoting Christian Knowledge. During the Boer War she went to South Africa, and was busy with improving the conditions for British troops there, including worship services, light entertainment, better food, cleaner facilities, enrichment classes and reading rooms. She was awarded a medal for her services, and made a Lady of Grace of St John of Jerusalem. She published a memoir of her war work, A Woman's Memories of the War, in 1901.

Back in England in 1902, she used her "formidable energy and organisational zeal" to gather Boer War veterans for the coronation of Edward VII; later she organized other clubs and leagues in London, including the Union Jack Club and the Women's Unionist and Tariff Reform Association (Tariff Reform League).

Books by Violet Brooke-Hunt include Prisoners of the Tower of London (1901), The Story of Westminster Abbey (1904), and Lord Roberts, a Biography (1914).

== Personal life ==
Violet Brooke-Hunt was engaged to marry Charles Bathurst in 1897, but the wedding seems not to have taken place. She died just before her 40th birthday, from heart failure attributed to exhaustion.
