= Winifred Boys-Smith =

British born New Zealand botanical artist and educator

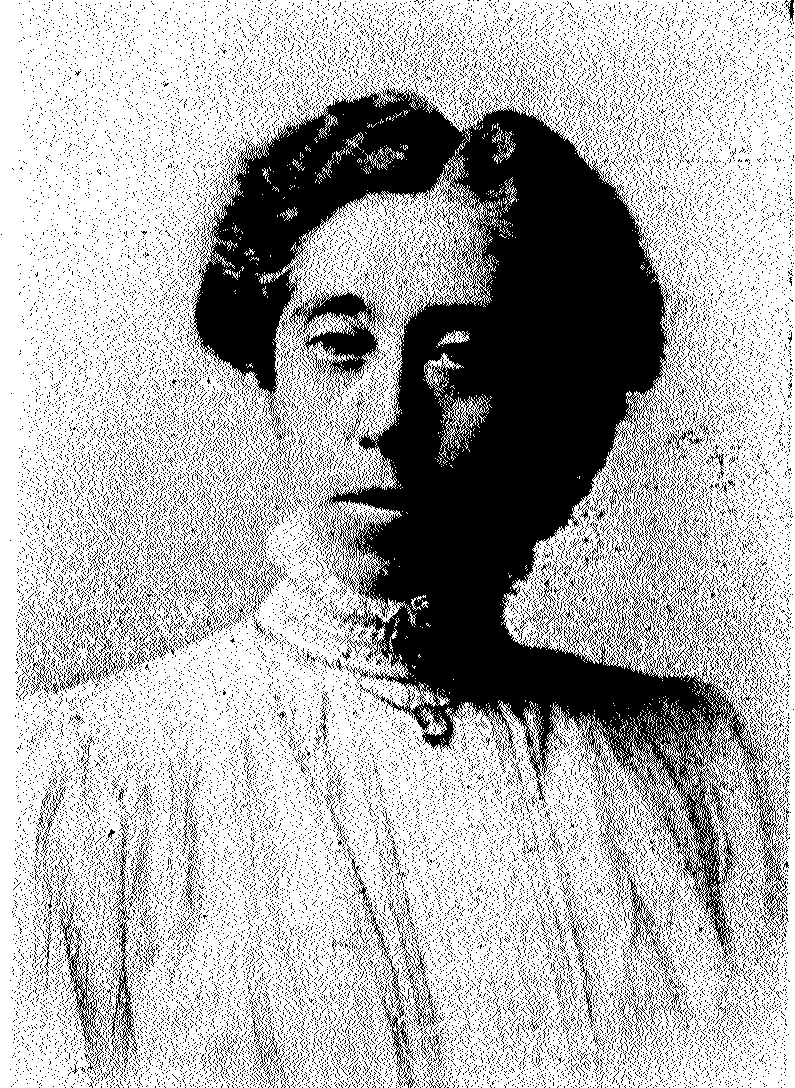
- Photo of Winifred Boys-Smith from the Otago Witness in March 1911
- Born: Winifred Lily Boys-Smith; 7 November 1865; Corsham, Wiltshire, England
- Died: 1 January 1939 (aged 73)
- Education: Girton College, Cambridge
- Occupations: Scientist, Professor

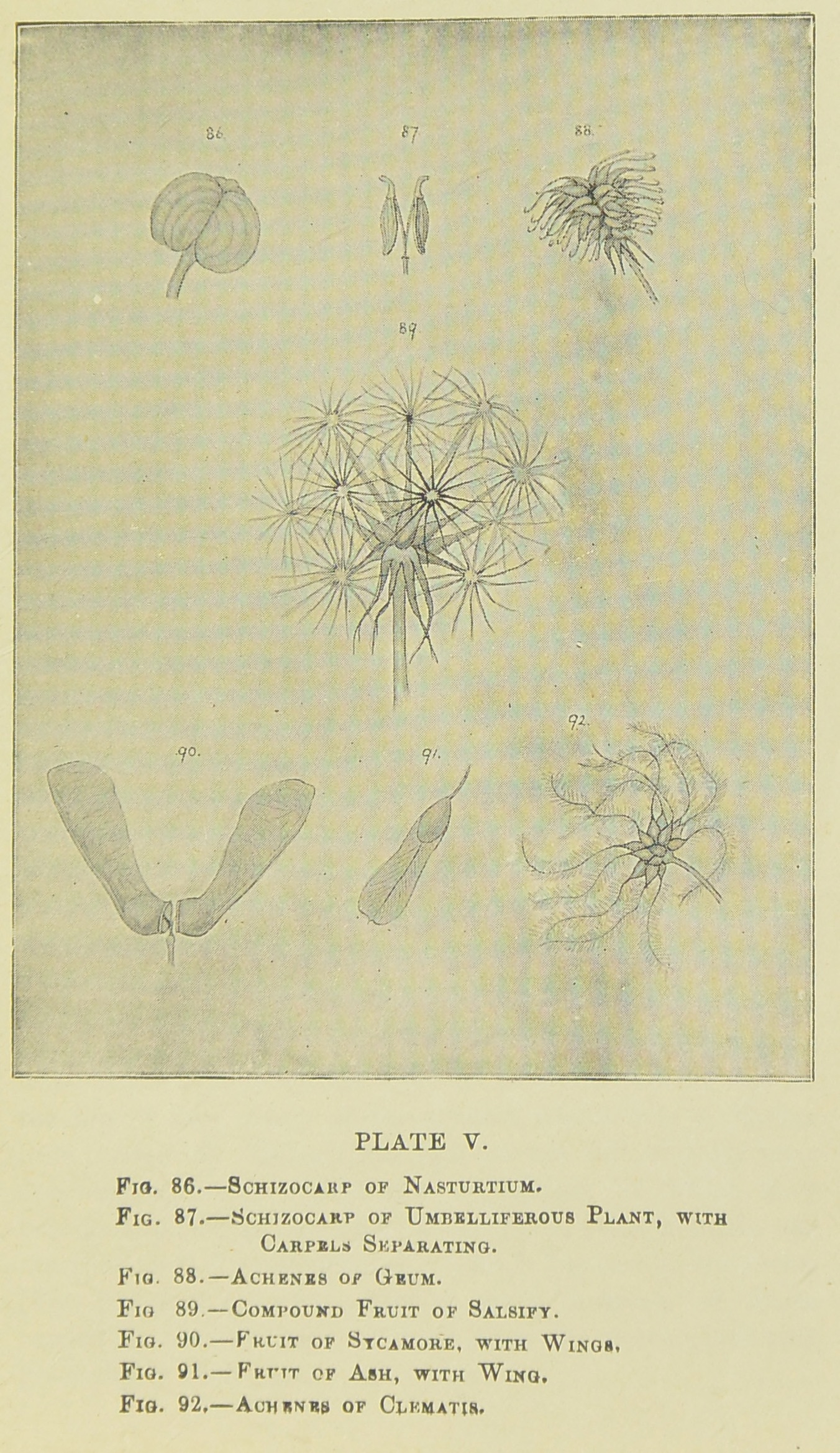
Illustration from Textbook of Elementary Botany

Winifred Lily Boys-Smith (7 November 1865 – 1 January 1939) was an English botanical illustrator and school principal, and then a university professor in New Zealand. She founded the department of home science at the University of Otago.

== Early life and education ==
Boys-Smith was born in Corsham, Wiltshire, England on 7 November 1865. Her father was an Anglican clergyman. She attended Tunbridge Wells High School, and then studied at Girton College, Cambridge, between 1891 and 1895. She took the full honours course for natural sciences tripos; however, she was only given a certificate as women were not granted degrees at the time. During her studies, Boys-Smith developed her botanical illustration skills, and when Flowering Plants was published in 1903, a review in Nature called the illustrations "unusually good".

She taught at Cheltenham Ladies College from 1896 to 1906, when she was awarded a Frances Mary Buss Memorial Travelling Scholarship, which she used to study science education in the United States. Boys-Smith then took up a position as the founding chair of home science and domestic arts at the University of Otago in 1911. She successfully grew the department from an initial five full-time students to more than 70 by 1920, at which point she retired.

After her retirement Boys-Smith helped establish Amberley House Girls' Collegiate School in Canterbury, before returning to England in 1921. Boys-Smith died on 1 January 1939 in Milford-on-Sea in Hampshire.

== Legacy ==
One nephew, John Sandwith Boys Smith, was Master of St John's College, Cambridge and Vice-Chancellor of the University of Cambridge from 1963 to 1965. Another nephew was Humphry Boys Smith DSO and bar DSC RNR, "one of the most successful Merchant Navy officers serving in the RNR during the Second World War."

Boys-Smith features as one of the Royal Society Te Apārangi's "150 women in 150 words" project in 2017, celebrating the contribution of women to knowledge in New Zealand.

== Books illustrated ==
- Laurie, Charlotte (1903). Flowering Plants: Their Structure And Habitat. Allman and Sons.
- Laurie, Charlotte (1905). A text-book of elementary botany. Allman and Sons.
