= Charlotte Laurie =

British botanist and educator (1856–1933)

- Born: Charlotte Louisa Laurie; 1856; Port of Spain, Trinidad, British West Indies
- Died: 25 March 1933 (aged 77); Cheltenham, England
- Occupation: Teacher
- Scientific career
- Fields: Botany

Charlotte Louisa Laurie (1856 – 25 March 1933) was a British botanist and educator known for her writing and teaching. On the staff of Cheltenham Ladies' College, Laurie wrote her first textbook on botany, which was widely used in secondary schools. She subsequently wrote two more botany textbooks. Her own botanical studies concentrated on the plants of Gloucestershire.

== Life ==
Laurie was born in 1856 in the British West Indies, the daughter of a clergyman in Barbados. She was educated at the Clergy Daughters' School in Bristol, and after some time in Barbados, the Maria Grey Training College. In 1880, she joined the staff of the Cheltenham Ladies College, where she wrote her first textbook on botany, illustrated by Winifred Boys-Smith. It went on to be widely used in secondary schools.

Laurie was a "beloved" figure in the community. She was so widely respected as an educator that it was said that "a student coached by her could not fail."

In addition to her role as an educator, Laurie held a number of positions. She was at one time Honorary secretary of the Association of Assistant Mistresses (and later its president), of the Cheltenham Natural Science Society, of the Christian Social Union, and of the College Missionary Society Leaflet.

According to The Cheltenham Chronicle,

"When Miss Laurie retired from the position she had for 37 years held the Ladies' College, it was stated in the College Magazine that she was 'looking forward serving the cause of education which she had always had so much at heart, with unabated vigour,' and this statement was borne out by the fact that for another 15 or 16 years she continued to do a valuable work in connection with the College in coaching students. This work was maintained until the illness to which, ultimately, she succumbed, and in fact she was coaching up to the end of last term."

She is known to have written at least three botany textbooks published between 1903 and 1906. Her botanical studies focused on plants in Gloucestershire.

Laurie died on 25 March 1933. Her funeral at All Saints' Church, Cheltenham, where she was a member for many years, was widely attended and reported. The choir from the Ladies College sang. Family members listed as attending her funeral were Mr. Farrar Laurie (nephew) and Miss Laurie (niece); Miss Peacock, the Misses Andrews and Mrs. Conyers.

== Bibliography ==
- —— (1903). Flowering Plants: Their Structure And Habitat. Illustrated by W.L. Boys-Smith. Allman and Sons.
- —— (1905). A text-book of elementary botany. Illustrated by W.L. Boys-Smith. Allman and Sons.
- —— (1906). Field Botany. Allman and Sons.
