= Margaret Johnson (scientist) =

British physician

- Education: Brompton Hospital
- Spouse: John Studd
- Children: 3
- Scientific career
- Workplaces: University College London; Royal Free Hospital; St John & St Elizabeth Hospital

Margaret Johnson OBE is a British physician who is a consultant in thoracic medicine and chair of the St John & St Elizabeth Hospital. In the late 1980s, she was the first dedicated HIV doctor at the Royal Free Hospital.

== Early life and education ==
Johnson trained in medicine at the Royal Brompton Hospital. She completed her research doctorate degree in breathlessness.

== Research and career ==
In the late 1980s, Johnson was the first doctor in the Royal Free Hospital to specialise in HIV/AIDS. At the time, she was one of the UK's few dedicated doctors who were trying to understand HIV when one in ten patients at the Royal Free Hospital with HIV died from the condition. She developed a holistic care programme that could accommodate thousands of patients.

In 2005, Johnson was named professor of medicine at University College London. Johnson studied the prevalence of HIV/AIDS in women. She set up the UK's first HIV testing clinic for women. She worked with Jane Anderson on creating the BHIVA guidelines on managing women with HIV.

Johnson was medical director of the Royal Free London NHS Foundation Trust and elected academic vice president of the Royal College of Physicians in 2015. She served as an advisor for the Channel 4 drama It's a Sin.

She is portrayed in the 2026 film Elsinore by Olivia Colman.

== Personal life ==
She was married to doctor John Studd until his death in 2021, with whom she had three children, a son Tom and daughters Josie and Sarah.

== Awards and honours ==
- 2004 Elected chairman of the British HIV Association
- 2010 Elected to the council of the Royal College of Physicians
- 2015 Elected vice president of the Royal College of Physicians
- 2022 Appointed an Order of the British Empire in the Platinum Jubilee of Elizabeth II

== Selected publications ==
- B G Gazzard; Jane Anderson; Abdel Babiker; et al. (1 October 2008). "British HIV Association Guidelines for the treatment of HIV-1-infected adults with antiretroviral therapy 2008". HIV Medicine. 9 (8): 563–608. doi:10.1111/J.1468-1293.2008.00636.X. ISSN 1464-2662. PMID 18826546.
- Margaret May; Mark Gompels; Valerie Delpech; et al. (11 October 2011). "Impact of late diagnosis and treatment on life expectancy in people with HIV-1: UK Collaborative HIV Cohort (UK CHIC) Study". The BMJ. 343 d6016. doi:10.1136/BMJ.D6016. ISSN 0959-8138. PMC 3191202. PMID 21990260.
- Ann K Sullivan; Hilary Curtis; Caroline A Sabin; Margaret A Johnson (13 May 2005). "Newly diagnosed HIV infections: review in UK and Ireland". The BMJ. 330 (7503): 1301–1302. doi:10.1136/BMJ.38398.590602.E0. ISSN 0959-8138. PMC 558202. PMID 15894552.
