= Andrew Pierce =

British journalist (born 1961)

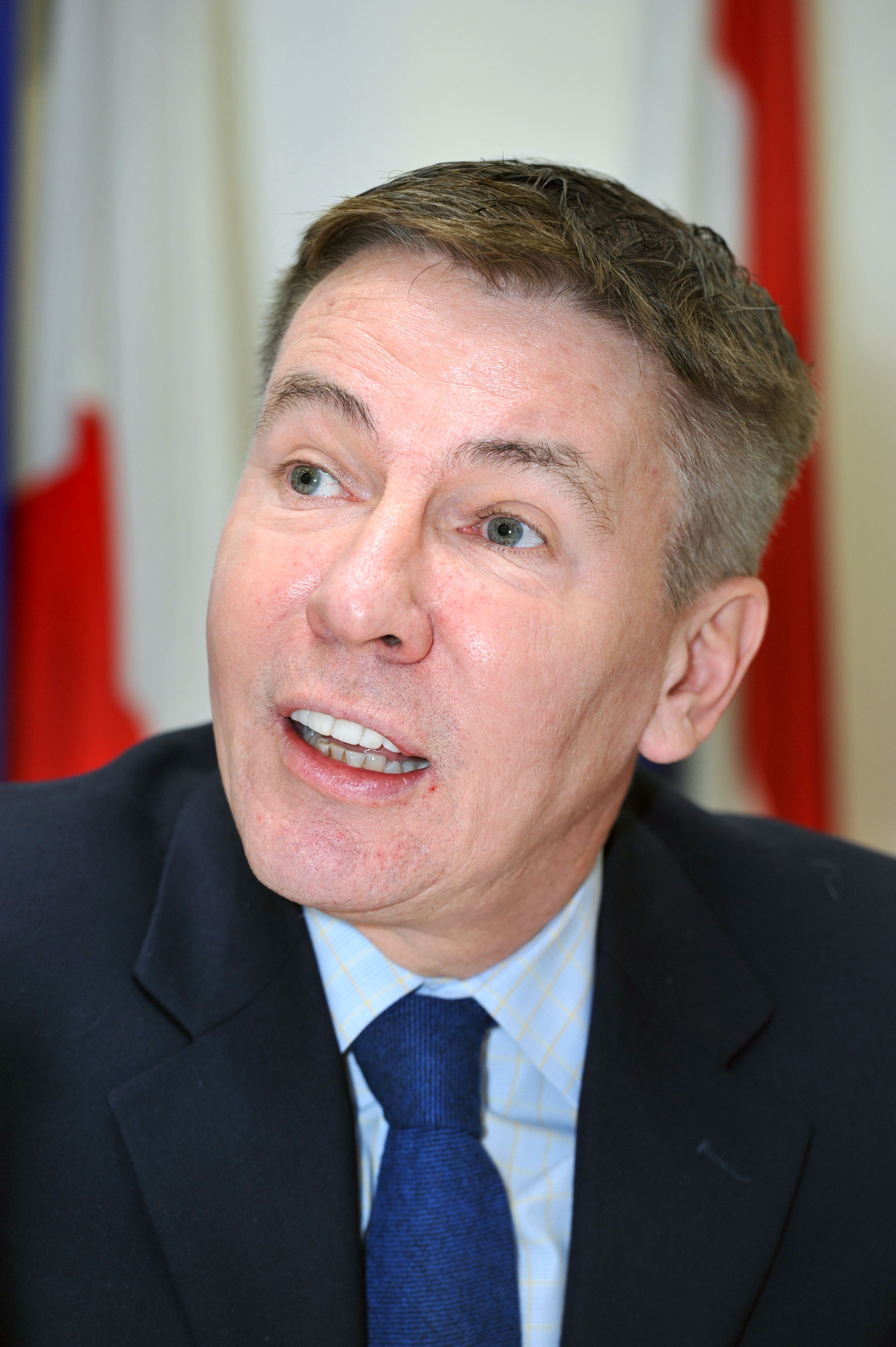
- Pierce in 2013
- Born: Patrick Connolly; 11 February 1961 (64); Bristol, England
- Education: St Joseph's Catholic School, Swindon
- Occupations: Journalist, editor, broadcaster
- Employer(s): Daily Mail, GB News
- Known for: Fmr. Consultant editor, Daily Mail (2009–2026); Fmr. assistant editor, The Daily Telegraph (2006–2009); Fmr. assistant editor, The Times; Fmr. political editor, The Times journalist, features writer, author and broadcaster

Andrew Pierce (born Patrick Connolly; 11 February 1961) is a British journalist, editor, author, broadcaster, and political commentator. He is a presenter on GB News. He was a columnist and consultant editor for the Daily Mail until his departure in July 2026.

== Early life ==
Pierce was born in Bristol to an Irish Catholic mother and an unknown father. He spent the first two years of his life in Nazareth House, a Catholic orphanage in Cheltenham, and was adopted by a family from Swindon and brought up on a council estate there. His adoptive father worked on the assembly line at British Leyland, a formerly state-owned car factory.

Pierce was educated at St Joseph's Roman Catholic School, now known as St Joseph's Catholic College, a state comprehensive school in Swindon. He did not go to university.

== Career in journalism ==
Pierce is a former assistant editor of both The Daily Telegraph and The Times newspapers, and the former political editor of the latter. He was a columnist and consultant editor for the Daily Mail, which he joined in 2009. He left the Daily Mail in July 2026.

Pierce presented a Sunday morning political radio show on the commercial radio station LBC 97.3 from 2008 until 2012, when he left. That radio programme was in the latter years presented as a double-headed show with Kevin Maguire from the Daily Mirror. Pierce and Maguire continue their double act reviewing, previewing and dissecting the media and politics on the BBC, ITV and Sky News. On 22 March 2014, Pierce started presenting a Saturday breakfast show on LBC Radio.

In 2014, the Daily Mail had to pay damages to Kirsten Farage after Pierce falsely claimed in a column that she had been a mistress of Nigel Farage, the then leader of UKIP, while he was still married to his first wife. In May 2018, the Daily Mail paid £11,000 towards the legal costs of the writer Kate Maltby after the publication of an article by Pierce about the claims of sexual harassment Maltby made against the politician Damian Green. The article was removed from the Mail's website without the publication having made an admission of fault.

Pierce is currently a presenter on the GB News television channel. He launched a weekly column, The Exclusive, in September 2026 on Substack.

== Personal life ==
Pierce was raised, and remains, a Catholic. He is gay and was chosen by The Observer in 2005 as one of the "gays who shape our new Britain". He strongly supports civil partnerships, and lives in a long-term civil partnership, per the Civil Partnership Act 2004. He opposed the introduction of same-sex marriage.

In a BBC documentary in 2018 about Greg Owen and the court case National AIDS Trust v NHS Service Commissioning Board, Pierce strongly criticised the idea of taxpayer-funded PrEP, a preventative medication to protect against contracting HIV: "That's what this is about: indulging gay men who don't want to use a condom. Well that's outrageous. Why should the taxpayer subsidise a reckless sex life of people in the gay community?"

Pierce is chairman of the Iris Prize.

== Selected publications ==
- Parris, Matthew; Prosser, David; Pierce, Andrew (1995), Great parliamentary scandals: four centuries of calumny, smear and innuendo, Robson Books, ISBN 978-0-86051-957-7
