= Laura Waters =

British physician

Laura Waters FRCP
- Born: Laura Jane Waters
- Alma mater: Imperial College London
- Known for: Genitourinary medicine
- Scientific career
- Workplaces: Central and North West London NHS Foundation Trust; Chelsea and Westminster Hospital; Mortimer Market Centre
- Thesis: Switch & simplification of antiretroviral therapy (2013)
- Website: www.uclh.nhs.uk/OurServices/Consultants/Pages/DrLauraWaters.aspx

Laura Jane Waters FRCP is a British physician, genitourinary consultant at the National Health Service (NHS) Mortimer Market Centre in London. She was chair of the British HIV Association (BHIVA) until 2023 and advises the NHS on HIV treatment. Waters is a regular contributor to Boyz magazine, and throughout the COVID-19 pandemic provided regular advice to HIV-positive people.

== Early life and education ==
Waters was born in Crawley. She grew up in Dorking, and attended The Ashcombe School. Waters studied medicine at Charing Cross & Westminster Medical School (CXWMS), which is now a college of Imperial College London. She completed her specialist training in genitourinary medicine in 2007. Her doctoral research involved ways to switch and simplify antiviral drugs. This included analysis the impact of the switch from efavirenz, an antiviral that is regularly used for antiviral therapy, to etravirine or maraviroc. After completing her doctorate Waters worked in clinical trials at Chelsea and Westminster Hospital and the Royal Sussex County Hospital, Brighton.

== Research and career ==
Waters is an HIV Consultant in the Central and North West London NHS Foundation Trust, where she works as a consultant physician in sexual health and HIV based at the Mortimer Market Centre . She leads several antiretroviral clinical trials, including studying the impact of antiviral drugs on body weight.

From 2019-2023 Waters was Chair of the British HIV Association (BHIVA). She is a Fellow of the Board of the British Association of Sexual Health & HIV (BASHH). In this capacity, Waters as informed guidelines on the treatment of HIV-positive people. Waters works with the JUSTRI (The Training and Resource Initiative), a non-profit organisation that to improve responses to HIV. As part of this partnership, Waters provides training to medical students around the world.

During the COVID-19 pandemic Waters worked to provide guidance for people living with HIV (PLWH). She provided advice through her column in Boyz magazine and on the BHIVA website. Waters worked with BASHH to produce a contingency programme to maintain sexual health during the SARS-CoV-2 lockdown. As many genitourinary and reproductive health doctors were moved to the frontline, Waters was concerned about the disruption to sexual health during the pandemic. The BHIVA and BASHH recommended that the government introduce digitised sexual health advice, provide free, secure access to emergency contraceptives as well as removing all barriers to care. In April 2020, Waters criticised the Government of the United Kingdom's decision to send a text message to HIV-positive people encouraging them to stay at home because of risk to coronavirus disease, as there was no evidence that people with well controlled HIV needed to shield. In May 2020, Waters, the BHIVA and the European AIDS Clinical Society released a statement that combined multiple clinical studies to evaluate the risk of HIV-positive people to become infected with coronavirus disease, and said that there was no additional risk for people living with HIV.

=== Selected publications ===
- Churchill, Duncan; Waters, Laura; Ahmed, Nadia; Angus, Brian; Boffito, Marta; Bower, Mark; Dunn, David; Edwards, Simon; Emerson, Carol; Fidler, Sarah; Fisher, Martin (2016). "British HIV Association guidelines for the treatment of HIV-1-positive adults with antiretroviral therapy 2015". HIV Medicine. 17 (S4): s2–s104. doi:10.1111/hiv.12426. ISSN 1468-1293. PMID 27568911. S2CID 32394203.
- Waters, Laura; Mandalia, Sundhiya; Randell, Paul; Wildfire, Adrian; Gazzard, Brian; Moyle, Graeme (15 May 2008). "The Impact of HIV Tropism on Decreases in CD4 Cell Count, Clinical Progression, and Subsequent Response to a First Antiretroviral Therapy Regimen". Clinical Infectious Diseases. 46 (10): 1617–1623. doi:10.1086/587660. ISSN 1058-4838. PMID 18419499.
- Gupta, Ravindra K.; Abdul-Jawad, Sultan; McCoy, Laura E.; Mok, Hoi Ping; Peppa, Dimitra; Salgado, Maria; Martinez-Picado, Javier; Nijhuis, Monique; Wensing, Annemarie M. J.; Lee, Helen; Grant, Paul (April 2019). "HIV-1 remission following CCR5Δ32/Δ32 haematopoietic stem-cell transplantation". Nature. 568 (7751): 244–248. Bibcode:2019Natur.568..244G. doi:10.1038/s41586-019-1027-4. ISSN 1476-4687. PMC 7275870. PMID 30836379.

=== Awards and honours ===
Waters is a Fellow of the Royal College of Physicians (FRCP).
