= 2023 in Scotland =

- Centuries: 19th; 20th; 21st
- Decades: 2000s; 2010s; 2020s
- See also: List of years in Scotland; Timeline of Scottish history 2023 in: The UK • England • Wales • Elsewhere; Scottish football: 2022–23 • 2023–24; 2023 in Scottish television

Events from the year 2023 in Scotland.

== Incumbents ==
- First Minister
  - Nicola Sturgeon (until 28 March)
  - Humza Yousaf (starting 29 March)
- Secretary of State – Alister Jack

== Events ==
=== January ===
- 2 January – Three people are killed after a fire breaks out at the New County Hotel in Perth.
- 16 January
  - Teachers in Scotland begin 16 days of "rolling" strike action, with strikes occurring in two local authorities each day, beginning with Glasgow and East Lothian.
  - The UK government announces it will block the Gender Recognition Reform (Scotland) Bill amid concerns about its impact on UK-wide equality law.
- 23 January – A fire breaks out in former department store Jenners on Princes Street, Edinburgh, resulting in the death of a firefighter and the injury of four others.
- 24 January – Following a trial at the High Court of Glasgow, transgender woman Isla Bryson is convicted of raping two women in 2016 and 2019, the offences having been committed before she began gender reassignment therapy. She is remanded to Cornton Vale women's prison, but moved to HMP Edinburgh two days later after First Minister Nicola Sturgeon says Bryson will not be allowed to serve her sentence at Cornton Vale.
- 28 January – Following controversy over the Isla Bryson case, the Daily Record reports that Tiffany Scott, a trans woman subject to an Order for Lifelong Restriction for stalking a 13-year-old girl, has successfully applied for a transfer from a men's prison to a women's facility. The Scottish Conservatives urge the Scottish Government to halt the move.
- 29 January – The Scottish Prison Service pauses the movement of all transgender prisoners while it carries out an "urgent review" into the transgender cases held in its custody.

=== February ===
- 9 February – The Scottish Prison Service concludes its review of accommodating transgender prisoners, and recommends that transgender prisoners initially be accommodated according to their sex at birth while an individual assessment is carried out.
- 10 February – Following a legal challenge by lap dance performers and club owners, a ban on lap dancing clubs in Edinburgh, scheduled to come into force in April, is overturned by Edinburgh's Court of Session after it finds Edinburgh City Council acted illegally by voting to limit the number of sexual entertainment venues in the city from four to zero.
- 15 February – Nicola Sturgeon announces her resignation as First Minister of Scotland and Leader of the Scottish National Party after eight years in the role; she will stay on until her successor has been elected.
- 16 February – Deputy First Minister John Swinney rules himself out of the SNP leadership contest.
- 17 February – The Royal College of Nursing recommends its members accept a new pay offer of 6.5%. The offer from the Scottish Government also includes changes to conditions.
- 19 February
  - Scottish Health Secretary Humza Yousaf and former Minister for Community Safety Ash Regan become the first two candidates to announce they will stand in the Scottish National Party leadership election. Keith Brown, the SNP's depute leader, Neil Gray, the Minister for International Development, and Màiri McAllan, the Environment Minister, all rule themselves out of the contest.
  - In a speech to the Scottish Labour Party conference in Edinburgh, Labour leader Sir Keir Starmer rules out a deal with the SNP "under any circumstances", and warns against complacency following the departure of Nicola Sturgeon as SNP leader and First Minister.
- 20 February – Finance Secretary Kate Forbes announces she is running in the Scottish National Party leadership election.
- 21 February
  - Kate Forbes insists her campaign to become the next SNP leader has not been derailed after she lost the support of several colleagues following comments about same-sex marriage and having children outside marriage, both of which she is opposed to as a member of the Free Church of Scotland.
  - MSPs vote 68–57 to approve the Scottish Government's budget for the 2023–24 financial year, which includes a tax rise for everyone in Scotland earning more than £43,662.
- 23 February – Sir Iain Livingstone announces he will retire as Chief Constable of Police Scotland in the summer after five years in the post.
- 24 February
  - Nominations close for the SNP leadership election, with Kate Forbes, Ash Regan and Humza Yousaf having all reached the threshold of supporters to go forward into the contest.
  - Two crew died after tugboat capsized & sank close to Greenock harbour.
- 25 February – Members of the Scottish Secondary Teachers' Association (SSTA) vote to accept a new pay offer from the Scottish Government, and announce they have suspended strike action scheduled for the following week.
- 28 February – Transgender rapist Isla Bryson is sentenced to eight years in prison with a further three years supervision.

=== March ===
- 1 March – Statistics released by the Scottish Government indicate Scotland's economy grew by 0.1% during the three months from October–December 2022.
- 2 March – Minister for Transport Jenny Gilruth announces plans to nationalise the overnight Caledonian Sleeper train service that links London with several locations in Scotland, taking effect from 25 June.
- 3 March
  - The Educational Institute of Scotland and other teaching unions call off a planned 20 days of rolling strikes scheduled to begin on 13 March after receiving an improved pay offer from the Scottish Government, worth 14.6% over 28 months. The proposals will now be put to a ballot.
  - Loganair announces it will suspend flights between Inverness Airport and some island airports for at least six weeks from 17 March because of industrial action scheduled to begin at Highland and Islands Airports Limited.
- 6 March – BBC News reports that the Scottish Prison Service is to be investigated for corporate manslaughter over the death of Allan Marshall, a prisoner at HMP Edinburgh, who died after being restrained by 13 prison officers in 2015.
- 7 March – STV hosts the first televised debate of the Scottish National Party leadership election.
- 10 March – Members of Scotland's largest teaching union, the Educational Institute of Scotland, vote to accept a pay deal from the Scottish Government that will end ongoing strikes in schools.
- 13 March – Voting opens in the Scottish National Party leadership election.
- 14 March
  - Members of the NASUWT narrowly vote to accept a pay offer, ending the prospect of further strike action in schools in Scotland.
  - BBC Scotland hosts the final televised debate of the SNP leadership election.
- 16 March – Scientists identify a gene variant that is known to increases the risk of breast and ovarian cancer, and trace it to people with Orkney Island heritage, more specifically those with ancestry on the island of Westray.
- 18 March – Peter Murrell resigns as chief executive of the Scottish National Party amid a row over party membership. Mike Russell succeeds him as interim chief executive.
- 21 March – At 8pm, Times Radio airs a leadership debate from Edinburgh and featuring the three candidates in the Scottish National Party leadership election.
- 22 March
  - First Minister Nicola Sturgeon issues a "sincere, heartfelt and unreserved" apology to people affected by the practice of forced adoption in Scotland during the 1950s, 1960s and 1970s.
  - A major incident is declared, with 35 injuries reported, after the 76m-long RV Petrel research vessel tips over at a dock in Leith.
- 23 March
  - Nicola Sturgeon attends her final First Minister's Questions as First Minister of Scotland.
  - The TikTok app is banned on all Scottish Government phones and electronic devices.
- 24 March – Research led by the University of Edinburgh suggests one in 50 people in Scotland have had lasting ill-effects after contracting COVID-19.
- 25 March – HIV Scotland announces it will close due to issues with governance and financials.
- 27 March – Humza Yousaf is elected as the Leader of the Scottish National Party and subsequently, First Minister of Scotland. He is the youngest holder of the position in history at just 37 years of age upon entry to office, the first from an ethnic minority background, the first Muslim to hold the office and the first First Minister with facial hair.
- 28 March
  - Humza Yousaf is confirmed as Scotland's First Minister by a vote in the Scottish Parliament.
  - Kate Forbes is to leave the Scottish Government after turning down a position in the Yousaf ministry.
- 29 March – Humza Yousaf is sworn in as Scotland's First Minister at Edinburgh's Court of Session and begins naming his Cabinet.
- 30 March
  - The Parliamentary Standards Committee recommends that former Scottish National Party MP Margaret Ferrier be suspended from the House of Commons for 30 days for breaching COVID-19 regulations in September 2020 when she took a train home from London following a positive COVID test.
  - Humza Yousaf attends his first session of First Minister's Questions since his election as First Minister. The session is interrupted on several occasions by climate change protestors, forcing the Presiding Officer of the Scottish Parliament to clear the gallery of visitors.

=== April ===
- 2 April – Stand-up comedian Janey Godley wins the inaugural Billy Connolly Spirit of Glasgow Award at the Glasgow International Comedy Festival.
- 4 April – Data produced by Public Health Scotland indicated that one in three people referred with urgent suspicion of cancer are waiting longer than the target date of 62 days.
- 5 April – Police arrest former SNP chief executive Peter Murrell as part of their investigation into the party's finances, but release him without charge pending further investigation.
- 6 April – Following a trial at the High Court in Edinburgh, Kashif Anwar is convicted of the murder of his pregnant wife, Fawziyah Javed, who he pushed from a rocky outcrop on Arthur's Seat, during a holiday in Edinburgh in September 2021. He is sentenced to life imprisonment with a minimum term of 20 years.
- 7 April
  - BBC News reports that Johnston Carmichael, the accountants who audit the SNP's accounts, have resigned from the role, citing a their decision to do so as having been taken following a review of their clients.
  - The Unite union announces that around 1,300 offshore workers are to stage a 48-hour strike from 24 April over pa, affecting production at dozens of oil and gas platforms.
  - Around 100 workers at Rosyth Dockyard belonging to Unite have voted to strike between 17 April and 10 July in a disagreement with their employers over pay.
- 8 April – SNP president Mike Russell tells The Herald newspaper he does not think Scottish independence can be achieved "right now", and that the party is facing its biggest crisis for 50 years.
- 12 April
  - The Scottish Government announces it will mount a legal challenge against the UK government's decision to block the Gender Recognition Reform (Scotland) Bill.
  - SNP leader Humza Yousaf confirms that his party will not pay any legal fees for former chief executive Peter Murrell, but that he will not be suspended from the party because he is "innocent until proven guilty".
- 13 April – Representatives from BBC Scotland, STV, Viaplay and the Scottish FA meet to discuss the broadcasting of men's football in Scotland, the rights of which are owned by Viaplay until 2028. The meeting, to discuss showing free-to-air matches, ends without resolution, but is described by Gavin Newlands MP as encouraging.
- 15 April –
  - The SNP's National Executive Committee orders a review of the party's transparency and governance.
  - Corach Rambler, trained in Scotland at Milnathort by Lucinda Russell, wins the 2023 Grand National.
- 16 April
  - The Sunday Mail publishes leaked video purporting to show Nicola Sturgeon playing down concerns about the SNP's finances.
  - The SNP says that its finances are "in balance" following reports the party is facing a financial crisis.
- 18 April – SNP treasurer Colin Beattie is arrested and questioned by Police Scotland in connection with their ongoing investigation into the party's finances.
- 19 April – Colin Beattie resigns as SNP treasurer with immediate effect.
- 22 April – Police Scotland make several arrests at Ayr Racecourse as the protest group Animal Rising attempts to disrupt the Scottish Grand National by invading the course. The race is temporarily delayed but goes ahead, with the race being won by Kitty's Light. 24 people are subsequently charged in connection with the disruption.
- 25 April – The Scottish Government introduces the Victims, Witnesses, and Justice Reform (Scotland) Bill, which includes measures to scrap the verdict of not proven and to reduce the number of jurors in Scottish trials from 15 to 12; bringing Scots law in line with England. The bill will also provides for a pilot scheme whereby some rape trials will be held without a jury.
- 28 April
  - The Crown Office confirms it will appeal against the sentence of Sean Hogg, a man given community service for the rape of a 13-year-old girl he committed as a minor, as unduly lenient.
  - The Stone of Destiny leaves Edinburgh Castle for the first time in 25 years to be part of the Coronation ceremony of Charles III.
- 29 April – The constituency Labour parties of Rutherglen and Hamilton, Larkhall and Stonehouse have written to Labour leader Sir Keir Starmer and Scottish Labour leader Anas Sarwar to make a formal complaint about the selection process for candidates, after being "inundated" with complaints by local members about a "lack of transparency".

=== May ===
- 1 May – Former US President Donald Trump arrives in Aberdeen to visit his Scottish golf properties.
- 2 May – The Scottish Government reverses plans to give £46m to colleges and universities, having identified the money as an "essential saving".
- 3 May – The SNP signs a contract with a new auditor, Manchester-based AMS Accountants Group.
- 4 May – Deputy First Minister Shona Robison confirms the Scottish Government will go ahead with its pledge to provide free school meals for all primary school pupils in Scotland.
- 5 May – Junior doctors in Scotland vote to stage a three-day strike over their demand for a 23.5% above inflation pay increase from the Scottish Government.
- 10 May – UK Prime Minister Rishi Sunak urges the Scottish Government to re-think its plans to introduce Highly Protected Marine Areas in Scottish waters, which would restrict fishing and other human activities to preserve the environment.
- 12 May – The Stand Comedy Club reinstates an Edinburgh Fringe show to be staged by SNP MP Joanna Cherry after previously cancelling it after it said staff were uncomfortable with her views about transgender people.
- 15 May – Stagecoach Group launches a driverless bus service on the Forth Road Bridge, believed to be the world's first.
- 16 May – COVID-19 in Scotland: The rules requiring people to wear face masks in Scottish care homes and healthcare settings come to an end after three years.
- 17 May
  - First Minister Humza Yousaf attends his first audience with King Charles III at Buckingham Palace.
  - An advertising poster featuring a picture of Michelangelo's David is removed from the Glasgow Subway at the request of the owners of the advertising space because of its nudity. It is replaced with an edited version hiding the crotch region.
- 20 May – The Annual General Meeting of the General Assembly of the Church of Scotland hears that hundreds of churches may have to close as a result of falling numbers of attendees and income.
- 21 May – Ten people are injured, and two are taken to hospital, after a bus crashes into a bridge in Glasgow and has its roof torn off.
- 22 May
  - The Scottish Government offers junior doctors in Scotland a 14.5% pay rise.
  - Margaret Ferrier loses her appeal against a proposed 30 day ban from the House of Commons over her breach of COVID-19 rules in September 2020.
- 24 May
  - Following a hearing at the High Court in Edinburgh, Rhys Bennett is sentenced to life imprisonment with a minimum of 24 years for the rape and murder of Jill Barclay as she walked home in Aberdeen in September 2022.
  - A group of eight former SNP councillors in North Lanarkshire form a new political party, Progressive Change NL, which becomes North Lanarkshire Council's second largest opposition party.
- 25 May – Responding to the outcome of a review of Police Scotland, its chief constable, Sir Ian Livingstone, says the force is institutionally sexist, racist and discriminatory.
- 27 May – First Minister Humza Yousaf accuses the UK government of sabotaging a pilot recycling scheme, the Deposit Return Scheme, by excluding glass from the project, glass having been a key part of Scottish proposals for the scheme.
- 31 May
  - Thomas Henderson, who along with his co-accused, murdered a man during a botched robbery at the deceased man's Dundee flat, is sentenced to life prison ent th a minimum of 18 years.
  - A huge wildfire covering 30 square miles (80 km^{2}), possibly the largest ever seen in the UK, is brought under control by the Scottish Fire and Rescue Service at Cannich in the Highlands.

=== June ===
- 6 June
  - MPs vote to suspend Margaret Ferrier, the MP for Rutherglen and Hamilton West, from the House of Commons for 30 days for breaching COVID-19 regulations, almost certainly triggering a by-election in her constituency.
  - Kevin Stewart resigns as Minister for Transport after experiencing poor mental health.
- 7 June – Circular Economy Minister Lorna Slater confirms that Scotland's Deposit Return Scheme is to be delayed until at least October 2025, meaning it will launch at a similar time to similar projects in other parts of the UK.
- 8 June – Members of the National Union of Rail, Maritime and Transport Workers at ScotRail vote to accept a 5% pay increase for 2023–24.
- 11 June – Police Scotland arrest former First Minister Nicola Sturgeon as part of their ongoing investigation into the SNP's finances. She is subsequently released without charge.
- 12 June – First Minister Humza Yousaf tells BBC News he will not suspend Nicola Sturgeon from the SNP following her arrest.
- 13 June
  - BMA Scotland announces that junior doctors have rejected a 14.5% pay offer from the Scottish Government and will stage a 72-hour strike from 12 to 15 July.
  - Màiri McAllan, Scotland's Cabinet Secretary for Net Zero and Just Transition, is additionally appointed as Minister for Transport, replacing Kevin Stewart in the role.
- 14 June – Jo Farrell, the current Chief Constable of Durham Constabulary, is appointed as Police Scotland's first female Chief Constable; she will replace Sir Iain Livingstone, who retires in August.
- 16 June – Buckingham Palace announces that Charles III has given Queen Camilla Scotland's highest honour, the Order of the Thistle.
- 17 June
  - Scottish Labour's deputy leader, Jackie Baillie, becomes the first sitting MSP to receive a damehood in the 2023 Birthday Honours, while others recognised in the Honours include footballer John Greig.
  - First Minister Humza Yousaf urges Prime Minister Rishi Sunak to ask the Indian government to release Scottish Sikh blogger Jagtar Singh Johal, who has been in prison in India since 2017.
- 20 June
  - Circular Economy Minister Lorna Slater confirms that Circularity Scotland, a firm due to manage a controversial recycling scheme in Scotland, has gone into administration.
  - Nicola Sturgeon returns to Parliament for the first time since her arrest in connection with the ongoing investigation into SNP finances.
  - A recall petition opens in the Rutherglen and Hamilton West constituency to determine whether Margaret Ferrier will face a by-election; 10% of eligible voters must sign it to trigger the by-election.
- 22 June – MSPs vote 66–44 to approve the Bail and Release from Custody (Scotland) Bill, designed to reduce Scotland's prison population.
- 24 June – Addressing a convention in Dundee, Scotland's First Minister, Humza Yousaf, says the SNP will use the next general election as a referendum to negotiate independence with the UK government if the party wins a majority in Scotland.
- 25 June – The Caledonian Sleeper is formally taken back into public ownership as the Scottish Government takes over responsibility for running the overnight train service.
- 26 June – Lecturers at Stirling University belonging to the Universities and Colleges Union announce a three-day strike beginning the following day amid claims their wages have been reduced by 50% for participating in a UK-wide marking boycott.
- 29 June – Lord Advocate Dorothy Bain launches a legal bid to overturn a 1997 ruling on evidence in rape cases that could allow more cases to be prosecuted.

=== July ===
- 1 July – First Minister Humza Yousaf announces that the SNP has changed the way it records donations after the issue was highlighted by its auditors. Having previously only kept online records of donations under £250, the party will now keep documented records of the donations.
- 2 July – During an appearance on BBC Radio Scotland's The Sunday Show, Conservative MSP Jamie Greene alleges that he lost his post in the Shadow Cabinet of Douglas Ross for supporting the Scottish Government's controversial Gender Recognition Reform Bill.
- 3 July
  - ScotRail train fares are increased by 4.8%.
  - Members of Orkney Islands Council, a Council area of Scotland, vote 15–6 in favour of investigating alternative methods of government that includes the potential to become a crown dependency of the UK or a self-governing territory of Norway.
- 5 July
  - King Charles III is presented with the Honours of Scotland during a ceremony held at Edinburgh's St Giles Cathedral.
  - SNP MP Angus McNeil is suspended from the party for a week following an argument with the party's chief whip, Brendan O'Hara, after he allegedly threatened O'Hara.
- 6 July
  - The Scottish and UK governments confirm plans to collaborate on new legislation to prevent landlords excluding parents and people on benefits from renting properties.
  - The 2023 Tiree Music Festival is cancelled a day before events are due to begin due to "extreme weather".
- 7 July
  - The Scottish Government urges Westminster to decriminalise the personal possession of all illegal drugs, and puts forward a number of proposals for the managed use of drugs.
  - BMA Scotland calls off a planned strike by junior doctors in Scotland while it consults its members on a revised 12.4% pay offer for 2023–24.
- 8 July – The Union Chain Bridge, which spans the River Tweed, linking England and Scotland, is named as an International Historic Civil Engineering Landmark.
- 10 July – Bus operator First Glasgow announces it is withdrawing all of its night-time services from Glasgow, doing so from 31 July.
- 11 July – Following his trial and conviction at Glasgow High Court, Logan Doig is sentenced to a twelve and a half year extended sentence for the rape and sexual assault of four women, and the sexual assault of a fifth. He must serve at least nine and a half years in custody and is placed on the Sex Offenders Register indefinitely. Doig's victims subsequently meet with Dorothy Bain, the Lord Advocate, to argue for a change in the way victims of sex crimes are treated in court.
- 12 July – Glasgow's Burrell Collection is named the 2023 Art Fund Museum of the Year.
- 13 July
  - Patients are evacuated from two wards at Paisley's Royal Alexandra Hospital after Legionella bacteria is found in the water supply.
  - Emails regarding the arrest of Peter Murrell are released and show that the Scottish Government was informed of the arrest shortly after it occurred.
- 14 July – Lord Advocate Dorothy Bain KC orders a review of how diversion from prosecution (referring an offender to social services rather than prosecuting them) is used in sex crime cases.
- 15 July – Six members of the environmental protest group, Climate Camp Scotland, are arrested after the group occupies the Ineos gas power station at Grangemouth oil refinery.
- 16 July – A pod of 55 pilot whales dies after becoming stranded at Traigh Mhor beach at North Tolsta on the Isle of Lewis.
- 19 July – Police launch an operation to remove climate change protestors from Grangemouth Refinery, making 11 arrests.
- 21 July – Police Scotland confirms that climate change protestors have ended their demonstrations at two oil refineries at Grangemouth and Clydebank.
- 22 July – Four climate change protestors are arrested at Grangemouth after chaining themselves to an old washing machine.
- 25 July
  - Following a trial at the High Court in Glasgow, Connor Gibson, 20, is found guilty of the sexual assault and murder of his 16-year-old sister, Amber Gibson, in November 2021. Stephen Corrigan, unknown to the siblings, is convicted of concealing the body.
  - The Scottish Government approves a £500m plan to expand Argyll's Hollow Mountain underground power station.
- 26 July – The Scottish COVID-19 Inquiry begins, with its opening hearing taking place in Dundee.
- 27 July – First Minister Humza Yousaf unveils a new Scottish Government paper on independence that includes plans for Scottish citizenship and passports.
- 28 July – Glasgow Life confirms it has cancelled the 2023 Bonfire Night event usually held on Glasgow Green and has no plans to hold any similar events in future.
- 29 July – Laura Mackenzie, whose offer of a job with Police Scotland was withdrawn when it emerged she had been prescribed antidepressants, launches legal action against the force. The offer was withdrawn after her medical history came to light during a health examination prior to starting the job, and because Police Scotland requires any recruits to be clear of antidepressant medication for at least two years.
- 31 July
  - Media outlets, including BBC News, report that a medical student has been expelled from the University of Dundee after filming the dissection of a human body and posting the footage online.
  - The 2023 Rutherglen and Hamilton West recall petition closes. A by-election is triggered after the petition to remove Margaret Ferrier from office is signed by 11,896 of the 81,124 eligible constituents, passing the required 10% threshold.

=== August ===
- 1 August
  - The UK's first permanent drone delivery service begins, with Royal Mail and Skyports establishing a daily inter-island mail distribution between three islands on Orkney.
  - An investigation into NHS Lanarkshire by the Information Commissioner's Office finds that staff shared the personal details of patients through an unauthorised WhatsApp group on 500 occasions during the COVID-19 pandemic. Staff were allowed to communicate through WhatsApp during the pandemic, but it was never authorised for communicating patient details, and the health board has apologised.
  - Climate change protestors from This Is Rigged throw paint over the entrance to the Scottish Parliament Building in response to the previous day's announcement of several new North Sea Oil contracts.
- 2 August
  - Edinburgh Sheriff Court rules that US citizen Nicholas Rossi, who faked his own death in 2020, can be extradited to Utah, where he is wanted on rape charges.
  - Robin Harper, who in 1999 became the first Green parliamentarian after he was elected to the Scottish Parliament, resigns his life membership of the Scottish Greens claiming the party has "lost the plot".
- 4 August –
  - Climate activist Greta Thunberg pulls out of a planned appearance at the Edinburgh International Book Festival because of its links to the fossil fuel industry.
  - Edinburgh's Court of Session rejects an attempt by the Scottish Government to delay the hearing into its legal challenge against Westminster's decision to block the Gender Recognition Reform (Scotland) Bill. The Scottish Government had wanted it delayed until after a separate hearing into determining the definition of a woman.
- 6 August – Five people are arrested when protestors interrupt the Men's Elite Road Race at Falkirk. The environmental protest group This Is Rigged claims responsibility.
- 7 August –
  - Police Scotland confirms that the bodies of three hillwalkers have been found after they failed to return from a trip to Aonach Eagach Ridge in Glen Coe two days earlier.
  - Education staff at ten local authorities who belong to the Unite union vote to take rolling industrial action after rejecting a pay offer from the Scottish Government.
- 8 August – Jamie Starrs is sentenced to ten and a half years in prison for the rape of Amber Gibson in June 2021, five months before she was murdered by her brother.
- 9 August – The names of several thousand people adopted as children going back 100 years are removed from the ScotlandsPeople website amid concerns over privacy and safety.
- 10 August – Social Security Scotland issues an apology over a staff quiz that included pictures of child killers. The Friday Fun Quiz asked staff to identify people called Ian from images, and includes pictures of Ian Brady and Ian Huntley.
- 11 August – At the High Court in Stirling, James White, the leader of one of Scotland's largest organised crime gangs who was extradited from Brazil to face trial, is sentenced to ten years in prison for series organised crime and firearms offences.
- 12 August – Police Scotland announces plans to cut civilian staff and freeze recruitment in order to maintain officer numbers.
- 14 August – Police are investigating the deaths of two 18-year-olds who attended an event at Glasgow's SWG3 venue.
- 16 August – Junior doctors in Scotland have voted to accept a pay offer from the Scottish Government worth 4.5% for 2022–23 and 12.4% for 2023–24.
- 17 August –
  - GMB Scotland announces that non-teaching staff in ten Scottish council areas will stage two days of strike action on 13 and 14 September.
  - The Scottish Parliament plays host to Comedy Unleashed, starring Father Ted creator Graham Linehan, after the show is cancelled by two venues in Edinburgh.
  - Carnbooth House, a listed building and former hotel in Glasgow, is destroyed by fire.
- 22 August – Broadcaster Nicky Campbell gives evidence to the Scottish Child Abuse Inquiry, where he alleges that a teacher who worked at two Edinburgh schools abused children on a "Savile scale".
- 23 August – Murray Foote is appointed as the SNP's new chief executive, replacing Peter Murrell.
- 25 August –
  - Alexander McKellar, who killed a cyclist on a remote road in the Scottish Highlands while drink driving in September 2017 and then hid the body, is sentenced to 12 years in prison.
  - Members of Unison in 24 of Scotland's 32 council areas vote to take industrial action after rejecting a 5.5% pay offer.
- 26 August – A search for the Loch Ness Monster, described as the largest in 50 years, gets underway both in the vicinity of Loch Ness itself, and through an online stream of the loch. A group of people looking for the creature subsequently claim to have heard sounds, but fail to record anything.
- 27 August – A large fire destroys Clune Park Primary School in Port Glasgow.
- 28 August –
  - The Scottish COVID-19 Inquiry, chaired by Lord Brailsford, formally gets under way with preliminary hearings at Edinburgh's Murrayfield Stadium.
  - BBC Scotland reports that the number of adults in Scotland receiving prescriptions for Attention deficit hyperactivity disorder (ADHD) has increased sevenfold over the last decade.
- 29 August – Data released by National Records of Scotland indicate there were 1,276 alcohol-related deaths in Scotland during 2022, a rise on the previous year, with figures at a 14-year high.
- 31 August – The first case of a new COVID-19 variant, BA.2.86, is detected in Scotland.

=== September ===
- 1 September – Education Secretary Jenny Gilruth confirms that Reinforced autoclaved aerated concrete (RAAC) has been found in 35 of Scotland's council-run schools after the roof of privately run Queen Victoria School in Dunblane had to be secured. The announcement follows revelations about the discovery of the concrete in schools in England, where more than 100 have been told to close affected buildings while repair work is carried out.
- 3 September – Neil Gray, Scotland's Wellbeing and Economy Secretary, says there is no immediate risk to schools in Scotland from defective concrete.
- 4 September – Connor Gibson is sentenced to life imprisonment with a minimum of 22 years for the sexual assault and murder of his sister, Amber Gibson, in November 2021.
- 5 September –
  - First Minister Humza Yousaf outlines the programme for government legislation for the year ahead, including improvements to childcare, an extra £1bn for social security and pay improvements for social care staff. There are also plans to ban disposable vapes over environmental concerns.
  - Former SNP MP Natalie McGarry is ordered to pay £66 for embezzling £25,000 from the SNP and a pro-independence group.
- 6 September – Nicola Sturgeon makes her first speech in the Scottish Parliament following her arrest in June.
- 7 September – Network Rail admits responsibility for a series of failings that led to the deaths of three people as a result of the Stonehaven derailment in August 2020.
- 8 September – Network Rail is fined £6.7m after admitting a series of failings that led to the Stonehaven train crash.
- 10 September – As the newly discovered BA.2.86 COVID-19 variant (known unofficially as Pirola) continues to spread, Professor Rowland Kao, an infections expert from the University of Edinburgh, calls for lateral flow COVID tests to be made freely available again.
- 13 September – Alister Jack, the Secretary of State for Scotland, confirms the UK government will not block Scottish Government plans for a drug consumption room pilot scheme in Scotland.
- 19 September – The Scottish Government begins its legal challenge against Westminster over the UK government's decision to block the controversial Gender Recognition Reform (Scotland) Bill.
- 20 September – Elena Whitham, the Minister for Drugs and Alcohol Policy, announces plans to launch a consultation on raising the minimum price of alcohol in Scotland to 65p a unit.
- 21 September – Hunter Street Health Centre in the East End of Glasgow is earmarked as the site of the UK's first legal drugs consumption centre.
- 26 September – Data released by National Records of Scotland indicates life expectancy in Scotland has fallen for the third consecutive year, with the average age now 76.5 years for men and 80.7 years for women; the decrease from 2022 is three weeks for men and six weeks for women.
- 27 September – Glasgow's Integration Joint Board approves the UK's first official drugs consumption room for illegal drugs.
- 28 September – Following a trial at the High Court in Stirling, Christopher McGowan, 28, is found guilty of the murder of Claire Inglis, his girlfriend who he battered and strangled, before burning her with a lighter and pushing a wet wipe down her throat.
- 29 September –
  - Two Scottish postmasters convicted of embezzlement because of a faulty computer system have their convictions posthumously overturned by the Court of Criminal Appeal in Edinburgh.
  - An office manager is awarded £37,000 by an industrial tribunal after her boss told her she used the menopause as an "excuse for everything".
  - Two people are treated in hospital after a collision involving the Flying Scotsman locomotive and Royal Scotsman train at Aviemore railway station.

=== October ===
- 1 October – Prime Minister Rishi Sunak announces £20m of levelling up funding to help regenerate seven Scottish towns that are described as having been overlooked.
- 2 October – ScotRail begins a six months trial during which peak time train fares are scrapped.
- 3 October – Aberdeen City Council says that reinforced autoclaved aerated concrete (RAAC) is likely to have been used in hundreds of properties in the city.
- 4 October – Police Scotland pays £60,000 compensation to four traffic officers told to shave off their beards before the force implemented its delayed proposals for a clean shaven policy.
- 5 October – Labour's Michael Shanks wins the Rutherglen and Hamilton West by-election.
- 6 October – Police Scotland scraps plans to recruit an extra 200 officers in January 2024 as it attempts to save costs following a projected overspend of £19m.
- 7 October –
  - The Met Office issues an amber weather alert for heavy rain in Scotland, while roads and train services are disrupted by flooding.
  - Ten people are airlifted to safety after heavy rain causes landslides on two roads in Argyll.
- 9 October –
  - Bernard Cowan, a grandfather who grew up in the Glasgow area, is confirmed as one of the people killed during a series of attacks launched by Hamas against Israel on 7 October.
  - Humza Yousaf, the First Minister of Scotland, condemns the attacks and expresses concern for his in-laws, who are "trapped" in Gaza after travelling there to visit relatives.
  - The Scottish Medicines Consortium (SMC) approves the weight loss drug semaglutide for use by NHS Scotland.
- 10 October – After making contact with his parents-in-law in Gaza, Humza Yousaf calls for a humanitarian corridor to be established.
- 11 October –
  - Sean Hogg, who was given a 270-hour community order after being found guilty of twice raping a 13-year-old girl when he was 17, has the conviction quashed on appeal after prosecutors admit making mistakes during the original trial.
  - Police are investigating fresh revelations about the Bible John killings after a podcast, Bible John: Portrait of the Serial Killer, alleged a cover up by police at the time, and that the perpetrator could be John Irvine McInnes, the cousin of a senior police officer.
- 12 October –
  - Lisa Cameron, MP for East Kilbride, Strathaven and Lesmahagow, crosses the floor from the SNP to the Conservatives citing "a "toxic" culture in the SNP's Westminster group".
  - Edinburgh Sheriff Court orders the extradition of Holocaust denier Vincent Reynouard, who faces trial in France for challenging the existence of crimes against humanity.
  - Aberdeen City Councillor Kairin van Sweeden refers herself to the Standards Commission after describing a fellow councillor who was born in Sri Lanka as a "New Scot" during a council meeting.
- 13 October – After sharing a video of his mother-in-law, Elizabeth El-Nakla, describing the situation in Gaza, First Minister Humza Yousaf says that Israel is "going too far" and that innocent civilians can not simply be "collateral damage".
- 14 October –
  - Scottish Green MSP Maggie Chapman says she regrets the "upset and anger" caused by her social media post in which she described the Hamas attack on Israel as "decolonisation" rather than "terrorism". She has since deleted the post.
  - Former SNP MP Lisa Cameron claims she and her family have had to go into hiding since she switched to the Conservatives after receiving threats of violence.
- 15 October – First Minister Humza Yousaf signals a change in his party's Scottish independence strategy, now saying that an SNP win in a majority of Scotland's Westminster seats would give the party a mandate to begin independence negotiations with the Westminster Government.
- 17 October –
  - Humza Yousaf announces a freeze on council tax for Scottish households during his closing speech at the SNP Party Conference.
  - French authorities increase security for a football match between Scotland and France in Lille following a terrorist incident in Brussels the previous evening that resulted in the deaths of two football fans.
- 18 October –
  - The Met Office issues a red weather warning for Scotland ahead of the arrival of Storm Babet, which is expected to bring heavy rain and flooding.
  - Following a trial at the High Court in Edinburgh, Andrew Miller, also known as Amy George, is sentenced to 20 years in prison after he was convicted of abducting a 13-year-old girl and subjecting her to a series of sexual assaults while holding her captive.
- 24 October –
  - Data from National Records of Scotland indicates there were 24,427 deaths in Scotland between December 2022 and March 2023, 11% higher than the previous year, and the highest number since the winter of 1989–90.
  - Jason Grant, who was hired as Scotland's first period dignity officer in 2022 but then lost the post after it was discontinued amid controversy over the appointment of a male, has settled with his employers out of court for a case of sex discrimination.
- 24 October – Anas Sarwar, the leader of Scottish Labour, accuses Israel of a "clear breach" of international law in Gaza and says there is "no justification for the withholding of essential supplies" from the people of Gaza. His comments come after a number of Scottish Labour resignations by officials who disagree with Keir Starmer's stance on the conflict.
- 25 October – Christopher McGowan is sentenced to life imprisonment with a minimum term of 23 years for the murder of his girlfriend of eight weeks, Claire Inglis, which took place after he was bailed to her address.
- 26 October –
  - The Times reports that WhatsApp messages sent by National Clinical Director Jason Leitch cannot be handed to the UK or Scottish COVID-19 inquiries because he deleted them on a daily basis.
  - Scottish band Young Fathers win the 2023 Scottish Album of the Year Award for their fourth album, Heavy Heavy.
  - Scottish Labour leader Anas Sarwar breaks with the stance of Labour's leader, Sir Keir Starmer, on the Israel–Hamas conflict by calling for a ceasefire in Gaza.
- 27 October – Former Health Secretary Alex Neil calls for an urgent review of the use of WhatsApp by government following revelations that National Clinical Director Jason Leitch deleted messages on a daily basis during the pandemic; he also says that many government ministers did not understand the rules for using the app.
- 28 October – Ash Regan, who stood as a candidate in the 2023 SNP leadership election, defects to the Alba Party after becoming disillusioned with what she describes as the SNP's "wavering commitment" to Scottish independence.
- 29 October –
  - First Minister Humza Yousaf says he has made contact with his in-laws trapped in Gaza for the first time since a communications blackout two days earlier.
  - The Sunday Mail reports that WhatsApp messages relating to the COVID-19 pandemic sent by First Minister of Scotland, Nicola Sturgeon, were manually deleted from her phone.
- 30 October – First Minister Humza Yousaf says that allegations he deleted WhatsApp messages relating to the COVID-19 pandemic are "certainly not true".
- 31 October – Scotland's Deputy First Minister, Shona Robison, confirms that Scottish Government will hand 14,000 electronic messages relating to the pandemic to the UK COVID-19 Inquiry.

=== November ===
- 1 November – Non-teaching staff belonging to the UNISON union at schools in Dundee City, Stirling, Clackmannanshire, Angus and Perth and Kinross announce strikes in the areas on 15 November.
- 2 November – The City of Edinburgh Council declares a housing emergency, citing the high number of homeless people in the city coupled with a shortage of social housing and high private renting costs.
- 3 November –
  - First Minister Humza Yousaf confirms his in-laws have crossed the border from Gaza into Egypt.
  - The Unison trade union suspends further school strikes in Scotland after receiving a revised pay offer from the Scottish Government, which will be put to its members in a ballot.
  - Fiona, a sheep believed to have been stranded on the banks of the Moray Firth for two years, is rescued.
- 4 November – Pro-Palestinian protestors occupy two of Scotland's major railway stations, Edinburgh Waverley and Glasgow Central, during another day of protests as the war in Gaza continues.
- 5 November –
  - Eight police officers are injured following Bonfire Night clashes with youths during which fireworks and petrol bombs are thrown; the most serious incident takes place in the Niddrie area of Edinburgh, where 50 youths clash with police. Two people are subsequently arrested over the Niddrie incident.
  - Humza Yousaf's parents in-laws return to Scotland.
- 7 November – Scottish ministers say they will not comply with UK government legislation to enforce a 40% minimum service during strike action, with Neil Gray, the Cabinet Secretary for Wellbeing Economy, Fair Work and Energy, describing the plans, outlined in the Strikes (Minimum Service Levels) Act, as "appalling".
- 9 November – First Minister Humza Yousaf defends £11,000 worth of roaming charges accrued Health Secretary Michael Matheson as he used his parliamentary iPad during a holiday to Morocco as a "legitimate parliamentary expense". Matheson has blamed the charges on an "outdated sim card".
- 10 November –
  - Around 500 employees of Scottish Water belonging to the GMB, Unite and Unison trade unions, begin a four-day strike over a pay dispute.
  - Scotland's Health Secretary, Michael Matheson, agrees to pay back the £11,000 of roaming charges he built up while using his iPad during a holiday in Morocco.
- 11 November – Edinburgh will become the first city in Scotland to make pavement parking illegal, starting in January 2024.
- 12 November – NHS Greater Glasgow and Clyde, Scotland's largest health board, is named in a corporate homicide investigation following the deaths of four patients at a Glasgow hospital.
- 14 November –
  - Seven members of a paedophile gang are found guilty of running a child sex abuse ring in Glasgow, described by the NSPCC as one of the worst cases of its kind in decades.
  - Scottish Conservatives threaten to table a vote of no confidence in Health Secretary Michael Matheson if he refuses to hand over his ministerial iPad.
- 16 November – In a statement to the Scottish Parliament, Health Secretary Michael Matheson admits the cause of his £11,000 roaming charges bill came from his sons watching football on his parliamentary iPad while the family was on holiday in Morocco. Matheson confirms he has repaid the money and referred himself to the parliamentary watchdog.
- 17 November –
  - A number of motorists have had their Glasgow Low Emission Zone fines cancelled after a tribunal ruled they were unenforceable due to a "procedural error" made by Glasgow City Council.
  - The Scottish Government publishes its plans for European Union membership in an independent Scotland.
- 22 November –
  - Petroineos announces to repurpose Grangemouth oil refinery, Scotland's only oil refinery, as a fuels import terminal with the loss of 400 jobs.
  - The McDonald's fast food outlet in Fort William says it has had to ban under 18s from the premises after 6.00pm because of verbal abuse targeted at its staff.
- 23 November – The Scottish Parliament Corporate Body confirms it has launched an investigation into Health Secretary Michael Matheson's £11,000 data roaming bill.
- 24 November –
  - Former First Minister Alex Salmond launches a fresh legal case against the Scottish Government over its mishandling of harassment allegations against him.
  - Universities Scotland adopts a new policy that requires potential students offered a place at a university in Scotland to declare any charges for violent offences.
- 25 November –
  - A police officer is taken to hospital after a civil disturbance breaks out in the East Ayrshire village of Auchinleck.
  - Stella Maris, the newly elected rector of St Andrews University, faces calls from students to apologise or resign after she said in an email that Palestinians had suffered "apartheid, siege, illegal occupation and collective punishment" during the Israel-Gaza war.
- 28 November – The Scottish Government publish a consultation for a new heating bill that will see the phasing out of gas boilers in Scotland, but the original start date of 2025 is expected to be delayed by three years.

=== December ===
- 1 December – Michael Russell steps down as chairman of the Scottish National Party as he bids to become chairman of the Scottish Land Commission.
- 5 December – The Scottish Prison Service issues new guidelines on transgender prisoners. Trans women who have hurt or threatened women or girls will not be sent to a female prison unless there are "exceptional" circumstances.
- 6 December – The Court of Session in Edinburgh rejects a bid by the Scottish Government to prevent the publication of details of an inquiry into whether former First Minister Nicola Sturgeon broke the ministerial code over a meeting with Alex Salmond's aide in the aftermath of allegations against Salmon in 2021.
- 7 December – Conservative councillor Wendy Agnew resigns as chair of Aberdeenshire Council's Kincardine and Mearns area committee following comments made about gypsies during a council meeting in November. Agnew is also being investigated by the Ethical Standards Commissioner following a complaint about the comments.
- 8 December – The Court of Session in Edinburgh rules that the UK government acted lawfully by blocking the Gender Recognition Reform (Scotland) Bill from becoming law, and rejects the Scottish Government's appeal against the decision.
- 9 December – An earthquake measuring 2.1 magnitude is felt in parts of the Scottish Highlands.
- 10 December – Foreign Secretary David Cameron threatens to withdraw co-operation with Scottish ministers following a meeting between Humza Yousaf, the First Minister of Scotland, and Turkish President Recep Tayyip Erdogan at the 2023 United Nations Climate Change Conference, which took place without the presence of a UK official and was consequently a breach of protocol. In response, Yousaf calls the threat "petty" and "misguided".
- 11 December –
  - New modernised trains are introduced on the Glasgow Subway as part of a £288m upgrade of the city's underground rail system.
  - The Foreign and Commonwealth Office is to move from its Abercrombie House offices in East Kilbride to an undisclosed location in Glasgow some time after 2025, it is announced, with His Majesty's Revenue and Customs moving from Queensway House to replace the FCO at Abercrombie House.
- 12 December –
  - Five men are charged in connection with historic sexual abuse at Edinburgh Academy.
  - Perth and Kinross Council provisionally approves a 100% increase in Council Tax on second homes.
- 13 December – Nuns Sister Sarah McDermott, 79, and Sister Eileen Igoe, 79, and carer Margaret Hughes, 76, are convicted of mistreating children at Smyllum Park, an orphanage in Lanark, from 1969 until its closure in 1981.
- 14 December –
  - Robert O'Brien, aged 45, Andrew Kelly, 44, and Donna Marie Brand, also aged 44, are convicted of the 1996 murder of Caroline Glachan following a trial at the High Court in Glasgow. All three were teenagers at the time the crime was committed.
  - US citizen Nicholas Rossi, wanted in Utah on rape charges, loses his appeal against extradition from the UK.
  - The Scottish Government confirms it will delay plans to set up a National Care Service by three years, moving it back from 2026 to 2029.
- 15 December – The Met Office issues an amber weather alert ahead of an expected month's worth of rain on 17 December affecting the Highlands and northern Argyll.
- 17 December – The UK's first spaceport for vertical rocket launches is granted planning approval by the Civil Aviation Authority. Full orbital launches from the site, on the remote Scottish island of Unst, are expected to commence from 2025.
- 19 December – Finance Secretary Shona Robison presents the Scottish Government's budget for 2024–25. Measures announced include a new 45% tax rate for people earning between £75,000 and £125,140, and a rise in the top rate of tax, paid by those earning over £125,000, from 47% to 48%. The £43,663 tax threshold is also frozen for the year.
- 20 December –
  - The Scottish Government confirms it will abandon its legal challenge against the UK government's veto of the Gender Recognition Reform (Scotland) Bill.
  - Transport Secretary Mairi McAllan confirms plans to make the A9 a dual carriageway between Inverness and Perth will be delayed from 2025 to 2035; she also tells MSPs the original cost of the project has risen from £3bn to £3.7bn.
  - Jo Farrell, the Chief Constable of Police Scotland, announces that the force will begin rolling out the use of body cameras from summer 2024.
  - Secretary of State for Transport Mark Harper announces that regulated train fares in Scotland will rise by 8.7% from April 2024.
- 22 December – A 78-year-old man has been charged in connection with the death of Marion Hodge of Lockerbie, who was last seen in 1984.
- 23 December – Multiple warnings for severe weather are issued for the north and west of Scotland following overnight snowfall.
- 24 December –
  - Humza Yousaf delivers his first Christmas message as first minister, using the address to pay tribute to volunteers and frontline workers.
  - A fleece from the world's first cloned mammal, Dolly the Sheep, is donated to National Museum Scotland.
- 26 December – A yellow weather warning is issued for heavy rain and high winds ahead of the arrival of Storm Gerrit, expected to cause disruption the following day.
- 27 December – Storm Gerrit brings widespread disruption to Scotland, with heavy rain, snow and high winds affecting much of the country.
- 28 December –
  - Around 3,000 properties remain without power following Storm Gerrit.
  - BMA Scotland, the Scottish branch of the British Medical Association, expresses its concerns about staffing levels in the NHS in Scotland, which it says is "dangerously low".

== Deaths ==
- 1 January – Frank McGarvey, Scottish footballer (St Mirren, Celtic, national team) (b. 1956)
- 18 March – Robert Lindsay, 29th Earl of Crawford, Scottish peer, MP (1955–1974) and Minister of State for Defence (1970–1972) (b. 1927)
- 21 March
  - Willie Bell, Scottish footballer (Leeds United, national team) and manager (Birmingham City) (b. 1937)
  - John Smith, Baron Kirkhill, Scottish peer, Lord Provost of Aberdeen (1971–1975) and Minister of State for Scotland (1975–1978) (b. 1930)
- 1 April – Ken Buchanan, professional boxer who became undisputed world lightweight champion in 1971 (b. 1945)
- 8 April – Bob Heatlie, Scottish songwriter ("Japanese Boy", "Cry Just a Little Bit", "Merry Christmas Everyone") and record producer (b. 1946).
- 30 April – Elizabeth Scott, Duchess of Buccleuch, wife of Richard Scott, 10th Duke of Buccleuch (b. 1954)
- 10 May – Hugo Burge, internet entrepreneur and owner of Marchmont House (b. 1972)
- 15 June – Gordon McQueen, Scottish footballer (Leeds United, Manchester United, national team) and manager. (b. 1953)
- 21 June – Winnie Ewing, Scottish politician (MP (1967–1979), MEP (1979–1999), MSP (1999–2003), President of the Scottish National Party (1987–2005)) (b. 1929)
- 26 June
  - Craig Brown, Scottish professional footballer and football manager. (b. 1940)
  - David Ogilvy, 13th Earl of Airlie, Scottish peer and Lord Chamberlain (1984–1997) (b. 1926)
- 2 July – Greig Oliver, 58, rugby union player.
- 6 September – John Cairney, Scottish actor (A Night to Remember, Cleopatra, Jason and the Argonauts), author and painter. (b. 1930)
- 5 October – Bill Munro, 89, Scottish football player (Barrow) and manager (Clydebank, Airdrieonians).
- 15 October – Edward Cairney, 82, convicted murderer
- 16 October – Gordon Low, 83, Scottish footballer (Huddersfield Town, Bristol City, Stockport County).
- 18 October – David P. Webster, 95, Scottish author, historian, and sports promoter (World Highland Games Championships), complications from dementia.
- 20 October –
  - Donald Angus Cameron of Lochiel, 77, Scottish clan chief and public servant, Lord Lieutenant of Inverness (2002–2021).
  - Donald Mackay, 86, Scottish-born Canadian chemical engineer.
- 31 October – Hugh Wyllie, 89, Scottish Presbyterian minister, moderator of the General Assembly of the Church of Scotland (1992–1993).
- 6 November –
  - John Fahy, 80, Scottish footballer (Germiston Callies, Oxford United).
  - Norman Munnoch, 94, Scottish rugby union player (Watsonian, Edinburgh District, national team).
- 8 November – Dale Reid, 64, Scottish golfer.
- 10 November – Colin Mackay, 79, Scottish journalist.
- 13 November – Gordon Wallace, 74, Scottish footballer (Raith Rovers, Dundee United, Berwick Rangers).
- 19 November – Eddie Linden, 88, Scottish publisher and poet.
- 26 November – Norman Irons, 82, Scottish councillor and honorary consul, lord provost of Edinburgh (1992–1996).
- 28 November – James Douglas-Hamilton, Baron Selkirk of Douglas, 81, Scottish politician, MP (1974–1997), MSP (1999–2007) and member of the House of Lords (1997–2023).
- 30 November –
  - John Byrne, 83, Scottish playwright (The Slab Boys Trilogy, Tutti Frutti, Your Cheatin' Heart) and designer.
  - Alistair Darling, Baron Darling of Roulanish, 70, British politician, chancellor of the Exchequer (2007–2010), MP (1987–2015) and member of the House of Lords (2015–2020).
- 1 December – Brigit Forsyth, 83, Scottish actress (Whatever Happened to the Likely Lads?, Boon, Still Open All Hours).
- 10 December – Willie McCulloch, 75, Scottish football player (Alloa Athletic, Airdrieonians) and manager (Cowdenbeath). (death announced on this date)
- 14 December – Hanzala Malik, 67, Scottish politician, MSP (2011–2016). (death announced on this date)
- 19 December – Sir Norman Arthur, 92, British military officer and Olympic equestrian (1960), GOC Scotland (1985–1988) and Lord Lieutenant of Kirkcudbright (1996–2006). (death announced on this date)
- 27 December – Jack McLean, 78, Scottish journalist and art teacher.

== See also ==
- 2023 in Northern Ireland
- 2023 in Wales
- 2023 in the United Kingdom
- Politics of Scotland
