= John Studd =

John Studd may refer to:

- John Studd (gynaecologist) (1940–2021), British gynaecologist academic and medical historian
- Big John Studd (1948–1995), professional wrestler
- John Edward Kynaston Studd 1858–1944), British cricketer, businessman and Lord Mayor of London
