= Greg Owen =

Greg Owen may refer to:

- Greg Owen (golfer) (born 1972), English professional golfer
- Greg Owen (activist), British HIV/AIDS activist
