= Denholm Elliott =

English actor (1922–1992)

Denholm Elliott CBE
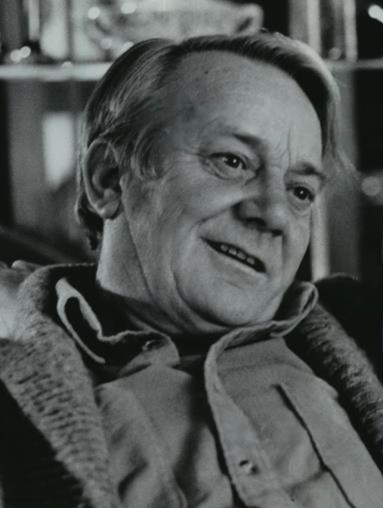
- Elliott in A Child's Christmas in Wales (1987)
- Born: Denholm Mitchell Elliott; 31 May 1922; Kensington, Middlesex, England
- Died: 6 October 1992 (aged 70); Santa Eulària des Riu, Ibiza, Spain
- Education: Royal Academy of Dramatic Art
- Occupation: Actor
- Years active: 1949–1992
- Spouses: Virginia McKenna (m. 1954; div. 1957) Susan Robinson (m. 1962)
- Children: 2

Denholm Mitchell Elliott (31 May 1922 – 6 October 1992) was an English actor. He appeared in numerous productions on stage and screen, receiving BAFTA Awards for Best Actor in a Supporting Role for Trading Places (1983), A Private Function (1984) and Defence of the Realm (1986), (Note: to this day, a still-unbeaten record.) and a nomination for the Academy Award for Best Supporting Actor for his portrayal of Mr. Emerson in A Room with a View (1985). He is also known for his performances in Alfie (1966), A Doll's House (1973), A Bridge Too Far (1977), Maurice (1987), September (1987), and Noises Off (1992). He portrayed Marcus Brody in Raiders of the Lost Ark (1981) and Indiana Jones and the Last Crusade (1989). On television, Elliott won the BAFTA TV Award for Best Actor in 1981 and was nominated for a second for Hotel du Lac (1986).

The American film critic Roger Ebert described Elliott as "the most dependable of all British character actors." The New York Times called him "a star among supporting players" and "an accomplished scene-stealer". He was appointed a CBE by Queen Elizabeth II in 1988.

== Early life and education ==
Elliott was born 31 May 1922, in Kensington, London, the son of Nina (née Mitchell; 1893–1966) and Myles Layman Farr Elliott, MBE (1890–1933), a barrister who had read law and Arabic at Cambridge before fighting with the Gloucestershire Regiment on Gallipoli and in Mesopotamia. In 1930, Myles Elliott was appointed solicitor-general to the Mandatory Government in Palestine. Three years later, following a series of controversial government prosecutions, he was assassinated outside the King David Hotel and buried in the Protestant Cemetery on Mount Zion. Elliott's elder brother Neil Emerson Elliott (1920–2003) was a land agent to Lady Anne Cavendish-Bentinck.

Elliott attended Malvern College and joined the Royal Academy of Dramatic Art (RADA) in London. He was asked to leave after one term. As Elliott later recalled, "They wrote to my mother and said, 'Much as we like the little fellow, he's wasting your money and our time. Take him away!'"

In the Second World War, he joined the Royal Air Force, training as a wireless operator/air gunner and serving with No. 76 Squadron RAF under the command of Leonard Cheshire. On the night of 23/24 September 1942, his Handley Page Halifax DT508 bomber took part in an air raid on the U-boat pens at Flensburg, Germany. The aircraft was hit by flak and subsequently ditched in the North Sea near Sylt, Germany. Elliott and four of his crewmen survived, and he spent the rest of the war in Stalag Luft VIIIb, a prisoner-of-war camp in Lamsdorf (now Łambinowice), Silesia. While imprisoned, he became involved in amateur dramatics. He formed a theatre group that was so successful it toured other POW camps playing Twelfth Night.

== Career ==
After making his film debut in Dear Mr. Prohack (1949) Elliott went on to play a wide range of parts, including an officer in The Cruel Sea (1953), and often ineffectual and occasionally seedy characters, including the criminal abortionist in Alfie (1966) and the washed-up film director in The Apprenticeship of Duddy Kravitz (1974). Elliott and Natasha Parry played the main roles in the 1955 television play The Apollo of Bellac. He took over for an ill Michael Aldridge for one season of The Man in Room 17 (1966).

Elliott made many television appearances, which included plays by Dennis Potter such as Follow the Yellow Brick Road (1972), Brimstone and Treacle, (1976) and Blade on the Feather (1980). He starred in the BBC's adaptation of Charles Dickens's short story The Signalman (1976) and was a special guest, playing a key supporting role, in Across The Andes By Frog, one of the Ripping Yarns (1977) written by Michael Palin and Terry Jones . He also co-starred with Jack Palance in the Canadian-American television film The Strange Case of Dr. Jekyll and Mr. Hyde (1968).

In the 1980s, Elliott won three consecutive British Academy of Film and Television Arts (BAFTA) Awards for Best Supporting Actor, for playing the butler to Dan Aykroyd and Eddie Murphy in the American comedy film Trading Places (1983), Dr. Swaby in the British comedy film A Private Function (1984), and the drunken journalist Vernon Bayliss in the British political thriller film Defence of the Realm (1986). He received an Academy Award nomination for playing Mr. Emerson in A Room with a View (1985). He also played Dr. Marcus Brody, an academic and friend of Indiana Jones, in Raiders of the Lost Ark (1981) and Indiana Jones and the Last Crusade (1989). A photograph of his character appears in Indiana Jones and the Kingdom of the Crystal Skull (2008), and a reference is made to Brody's death. A statue was also dedicated to Brody outside Marshall College, the school where Indiana Jones teaches. In 1988 Elliott played the Russian mole Povin, around whom the entire plot revolves, in the television miniseries Codename: Kyril.

Having filmed Michael Winner's The Wicked Lady (1983), Elliott was quoted in a BBC Radio interview as saying that Marc Sinden and he "are the only two British actors I am aware of who have ever worked with Winner more than once, and it certainly wasn't for love. But curiously, I never, ever saw any of the same crew twice." (Elliott in You Must Be Joking! (1965) and The Wicked Lady and Sinden in The Wicked Lady and Decadence). Elliott had worked with Sinden's father, Donald Sinden, in The Cruel Sea. He co-starred with Katharine Hepburn and Harold Gould in the television film Mrs. Delafield Wants to Marry (1986) and with Nicole Kidman in Bangkok Hilton (1989).

His career included many stage performances, including with the Royal Shakespeare Company, and an acclaimed turn as the twin brothers in Jean Anouilh's Ring Round the Moon.

In 1988, Elliott was appointed a Commander of the Order of the British Empire (CBE) for his services to acting. His scene-stealing abilities led Gabriel Byrne, his co-star in Defence of the Realm, to say, "Never act with children, dogs, or Denholm Elliott." Described by the British Film Institute's Screenonline as an actor of "versatile understanding and immaculate technique," Elliott described himself as an instinctive actor and was a critic of Stanislavski's system of acting, saying, "I mistrust and am rather bored with actors who are of the Stanislavski school who think about detail."

== Personal life and death ==
Elliott married twice and was secretly bisexual. He was first married to actress Virginia McKenna from 1954 to 1957. In 1962, he married American actress Susan Robinson, 20 years his junior, with whom he would have an open marriage and two children.

Elliott was diagnosed with HIV in 1987 and died of AIDS-related tuberculosis at his home in Santa Eulària des Riu on Ibiza, on 6 October 1992, aged 70. Tributes were paid by actors Donald Sinden and Peter Ustinov, the dramatist Dennis Potter, and Virginia McKenna. Sinden said: "He was one of the finest screen actors and a very special actor at that. He was one of the last stars who was a real gentleman. It is a very sad loss." Ustinov said: "He was a wonderful actor and a very good friend on the occasions that life brought us together." Potter called him "a complicated, sensitive, and slightly disturbing actor" and "a dry, witty, and slightly menacing individual." McKenna added, "It is absolutely dreadful, but the person I am thinking of at the moment more than anybody is his wife. It must be terrible for her." Ismail Merchant described Elliott as "an all-giving person, full of life ... He had an affection and feeling for other actors, which is very unusual in our business."

Elliott's widow set up a charity, the Denholm Elliott Project, and collaborated on his biography. She worked closely with the UK Coalition of People Living with HIV and AIDS. She died on 12 April 2007, aged 65, in a fire in her flat in Hornsey, London. Their daughter Jennifer died by suicide in Ibiza in 2003. In 1995, News of the World had published an article exposing her addiction to heroin and alleging that she was a beggar and prostitute, a piece which the tabloid's former deputy features editor Paul McMullan later admitted had "totally humiliated and destroyed her."

== Acting credits ==
=== Film ===
Year	Title	Role	Notes	Ref.
1949	Dear Mr. Prohack	Oswald Morfrey		
1952	The Sound Barrier	Christopher Ridgefield	Breaking the Sound Barrier in USA	
1952	The Holly and the Ivy	Michael Gregory		
1952	The Ringer	John Lemley		
1953	The Cruel Sea	Morell		
1953	The Heart of the Matter	Wilson		
1954	Lease of Life	Martin Blake		
1954	They Who Dare	Sergeant Corcoran		
1955	The Man Who Loved Redheads	Denis		
1955	The Night My Number Came Up	Mackenzie		
1956	Pacific Destiny	Arthur Grimble		
1960	Scent of Mystery	Oliver Larker		
1963	Station Six-Sahara	Macey		
1964	Nothing But the Best	Charlie Prince		
1965	The High Bright Sun	Baker		
1965	King Rat	Larkin		
1966	Alfie	The Abortionist		
1967	Maroc 7	Inspector Barrada		
1968	The Night They Raided Minsky's	Vance Fowler		
1968	The Sea Gull	Dorn, a doctor		
1970	Too Late the Hero	Captain Hornsby		
1970	The Rise and Rise of Michael Rimmer	Peter Niss		
1971	Percy	Emmanuel Whitbread		
1971	The House That Dripped Blood	Charles Hillyer	Segment 1: Method for Murder	
1971	Quest for Love	Tom Lewis		
1972	Madame Sin	Malcolm De Vere		
1973	The Vault of Horror	Diltant	Segment 5: Drawn and Quartered	
1973	A Doll's House	Krogstad		
1974	The Apprenticeship of Duddy Kravitz	Friar		
1975	Russian Roulette	Commander Petapiece		
1976	Robin and Marian	Will Scarlet		
1976	To the Devil a Daughter	Henry Beddows		
1976	Partners	John Grey		
1976	Voyage of the Damned	Admiral Canaris		
1977	A Bridge Too Far	RAF Met. Officer		
1978	The Hound of the Baskervilles	Stapleton		
1978	Watership Down	Cowslip	(voice)	
1978	The Boys From Brazil	Sidney Beynon		
1978	Sweeney 2	Detective Chief Superintendent Jupp		
1979	Zulu Dawn	Henry Pulleine		
1979	Saint Jack	William Leigh		
1979	Cuba	Donald Skinner		
1980	Bad Timing	Stefan Vognic		
1980	Rising Damp	Charles Seymour		
1980	Sunday Lovers	Parker	Segment: An Englishman's Home	
1981	Raiders of the Lost Ark	Marcus Brody		
1982	The Missionary	The Bishop		
1982	Brimstone and Treacle	Mr. Tom Bates		
1983	The Wicked Lady	Sir Ralph Skelton		
1983	The Blue Dress			
1983	Trading Places	Coleman		
1984	The Razor's Edge	Elliott Templeton		
1984	A Private Function	Dr. Charles Swaby		
1985	A Room with a View	Mr. Emerson		
1985	Underworld	Dr Savary		
1986	Defence of the Realm	Vernon Bayliss		
1986	The Whoopee Boys	Colonel Phelps		
1987	September	Howard		
1987	Maurice	Dr Barry		
1988	Stealing Heaven	Fulbert		
1989	Indiana Jones and the Last Crusade	Marcus Brody		
1989	Killing Dad	Nathy		
1991	Toy Soldiers	Headmaster		
1991	Scorchers	Howler		
1992	Noises Off	Selsdon Mowbray	Final film role	

=== Television ===
Year	Title	Role	Notes
1958	Alfred Hitchcock Presents	Jack Lyons	Season 3 Episode 34: "The Crocodile Case"
1959	Alfred Hitchcock Presents	John Manbridge	Season 4 Episode 21: "Relative Value"
1963	Hancock	Peter Dartford	1 episode
1965	Danger Man	Basil Jordan	Season 3 Episode 18: The Hunting Party
1966	The Man in Room 17	Defraits	13 episodes
1966	Mystery and Imagination	Roderick Usher	Episode: The Fall of the House of Usher
1968	The Strange Case of Dr. Jekyll and Mr. Hyde	George Devlin	TV film
1968	Mystery and Imagination	Count Dracula	Episode: Dracula
1972	The Persuaders!	Roland	Episode: A Death in the Family
1972	Follow the Yellow Brick Road	Jack Black	TV play
1975	Thriller	Dr. Frank Henson	Episode: The Crazy Kill
1976	Brimstone and Treacle	Mr. Tom Bates	TV play: Play for Today
1976	Clayhanger	Tertius Ingpen	9 episodes
1976	The Signalman	The Signalman	TV play
1977	Ripping Yarns	Mr. Gregory	Episode: Across the Andes by Frog
1980	Hammer House of Horror	Norman Shenley	Episode: Rude Awakening
1980	Blade on the Feather	Jack Hill	TV film
1980	Tales of the Unexpected	Harold	TV Series, Season 3 ep 7, "The Stinker"
1982	Marco Polo	Niccolò Polo	8 episodes
1983	The Hound of the Baskervilles	Dr. Mortimer	TV film
1984	Camille	Count de Noilly	TV film
1985	Bleak House	John Jarndyce	7 episodes
1986	Mrs. Delafield Wants to Marry	George Parker	TV film
1987	Hotel du Lac	Phillip Neville	TV film
1987	Scoop	Mr. Salter	TV film
1987	A Child's Christmas in Wales	Old Geraint	TV film
1987	The Happy Valley	Sir Henry 'Jock' Delves Broughton	TV film
1988	Codename: Kyril	Povin	4 episodes
1988	The Ray Bradbury Theater	Tom Cotter	Episode: The Coffin
1988	The Bourne Identity	Dr Geoffrey Washburn	TV mini-series
1988	Noble House	Alastair Struan	4 episodes
1989	Bangkok Hilton	Hal Stanton	3 episodes
1990	A Green Journey	James O'Hannon	TV film
1991	A Murder of Quality	George Smiley	TV film
1991	One Against the Wind	Father LeBlanc	TV film
1991	The Black Candle	William Filmore	TV film

=== Theatre ===
Year	Title	Role(s)	Notes	Ref.
1946	The Guinea Pig		West End debut	
1950	Venus Observed	Edgar		
1950	Ring Round the Moon	Frederic, Hugo	Broadway debut	
1951	The Green Bay Tree	Julian		
1951	A Sleep of Prisoners			
1953	The Confidential Clerk			
1957	Monique	Fernand Ravinel		
1958	Traveller Without Luggage			
1960	The Merchant of Venice	Bassanio		
1960	The Two Gentlemen of Verona	Valentine		
1960	Troilus and Cressida	Troilus		
1961	Write Me a Murder	The Hon. Clive Rodingham		
1964	The Seagull	Trigorin		
1964	The Crucible	Reverend John Hale		
1967	The Imaginary Invalid	Dr. Diaforus		
1967	A Touch of the Poet	Cornelius Melody		
1967	Tonight at 8.30	Alec Harvey		
1970	Come As You Are			
1975	The Return of A. J. Raffles	A. J. Raffles		
1977	The New York Idea			
1977	Three Sisters			
1989	A Life in the Theatre	Robert		

== Awards and nominations ==
Year	Award	Category	Nomination	Result
1986	Academy Awards	Best Supporting Actor	A Room with a View	Nominated
1973	British Academy Film Awards	Best Supporting Actor	A Doll's House	Nominated
1979	British Academy Film Awards	Best Supporting Actor	Saint Jack	Nominated
1981	British Academy Film Awards	Best Supporting Actor	Raiders of the Lost Ark	Nominated
1983	British Academy Film Awards	Best Supporting Actor	Trading Places	Won
1984	British Academy Film Awards	Best Supporting Actor	A Private Function	Won
1985	British Academy Film Awards	Best Supporting Actor	Defence of the Realm	Won
1986	British Academy Film Awards	Best Supporting Actor	A Room with a View	Nominated
1981	British Academy Television Awards	Best Actor	BBC2 Playhouse: Gentlefolk & In Hiding Blade on the Feather; Tales of the Unexpected: The Stinker	Won
1986	British Academy Television Awards	Best Actor	Screen Two: Hotel du Lac	Nominated

== See also ==
- List of Academy Award winners and nominees from Great Britain
- List of British actors
- List of people from Kensington
- List of RADA alumni
