= HIV Medicine =

- Discipline: HIV/AIDS
- Language: English
- Edited by: Brian Gazzard, Jens Lundgren

Publication details
- History: 1999-present
- Publisher: Wiley-Blackwell on behalf of the British HIV Association
- Frequency: Bimonthly
- Impact factor: 3.734 (2018)

Standard abbreviations
- ISO 4: HIV Med.

Indexing
- CODEN: HMIEAB
- ISSN: 1464-2662 (print); 1468-1293 (web)
- OCLC no.: 884089339

Links
- Journal homepage; Online access; Online archive

HIV Medicine is a bimonthly peer-reviewed medical journal covering HIV/AIDS research. It was established in 1999 and is published by Wiley-Blackwell on behalf of the British HIV Association, of which it is the official journal. It is also the official journal of the European AIDS Clinical Society and the Australasian Society for HIV Medicine. The editors-in-chief are Brian Gazzard (Chelsea and Westminster Hospital) and Jens Lundgren (University of Copenhagen). According to the Journal Citation Reports, the journal has a 2014 impact factor of 3.988, ranking it 18th out of 78 journals in the category "Infectious Diseases".
