= UKC =

UKC is an abbreviation that can have several meanings:

- UK Coalition of People Living with HIV and AIDS, a UK charity run by and for people living with HIV.
- Under keel clearance, the distance between the keel of a ship and the seabed below it.
- United Kennel Club, an American all-breed registry of purebred dog pedigrees.
- University Medical Centre Ljubljana, the hospital centre in Slovenia
- University of Kent at Canterbury, the former official title of the University of Kent, a university in the UK. University of Kent at Canterbury is also now used to refer to the Canterbury campus, as well as for the university as a whole, as is the abbreviation "UKC".
- USS Kansas City, the designation of two United States Navy vessels:
  - The first Kansas City (CA-128) was to have been a heavy cruiser, but was cancelled due to the end of World War II, just days after being laid down.
  - The first commissioned Kansas City (AOR-3) was a replenishment oiler in service from 1970 to 1994.
