= HIV/AIDS in the United Kingdom =

AIDS was first diagnosed in 1981. As of year-end 2018, 160,493 people have been diagnosed with HIV in the United Kingdom and an estimated 7,500 people are living undiagnosed with HIV. New diagnoses are highest in gay/bisexual men, with an estimated 51% of new diagnosis reporting male same-sex sexual activity as the probable route of infection. Between 2009 and 2018 there was a 32% reduction in new HIV diagnosis, attributed by Public Health England (PHE) to better surveillance and education. PHE has described an "outbreak" in Glasgow amongst people who inject drugs, and has campaigns targeting men who have sex with men in London and other major cities. London was the first city in the world to reach the World Health Organization target for HIV, set at 90% of those with HIV diagnosed, 90% of those diagnosed on HAART and 90% of those on HAART undetectable. The UK as a whole later achieved the same target. Under the Equality Act 2010, it is illegal to discriminate against someone based on their HIV status in the UK.

== Demographics ==
In 2017, 93,385 people (64,472 men and 28,877 women) living with diagnosed HIV infection received HIV care in the UK. 42,739 of those are gay or bisexual.

In 2017, the prevalence of HIV in the United Kingdom was estimated at 101,600 (credible interval 99,300 to 106,400) with 92% (credible interval 88 to 94%) diagnosed. Prevalence is highest in gay/bisexual men in London with an estimated 83 (credible interval 73 to 96) per 1000 gay and bisexual men aged 15 to 74 years. HIV prevalence in this group was higher in London compared with the rest of England (134/1,000 CrI 113 to 156 and 63/1,000 CrI 53 to 76, respectively). However, the 2017 statistics showed a tremendous decrease in the number of newly HIV infected gay men during 2015-17. The number of newly HIV infected gay men decreased by a third in just two years.

During 2021, 2,995 people were newly diagnosed. An estimated 42% of diagnoses were late (likely to have been living with the virus for over three years). Late diagnosis is associated with a 10-fold increase in the chance of death during the first year after diagnosis. Risk groups have been identified by various organisations, including National Institute for Health and Care Excellence, National Health Service and the IMPACT trial for pre-exposure prophylaxis. They are:

Risk groups identified by UK health organisations
NHS for HIV	NICE for HIV testing	IMPACT for PrEP access
From a country with high rates of HIV		Heterosexual people at risk
People who share needles	People who inject drugs	Heterosexual people at risk
People who have received a blood transfusion abroad		Heterosexual people at risk
Heterosexual with black African ethnicity	X mark	X mark
Men who have sex with men
Trans women who have sex with men		Trans men and trans women
People who participate in chemsex		X mark
People diagnosed with any other STI		X mark
Sexual contact with any other risk group		HIV-negative people with HIV-positive partners

== Treatment and prognosis ==
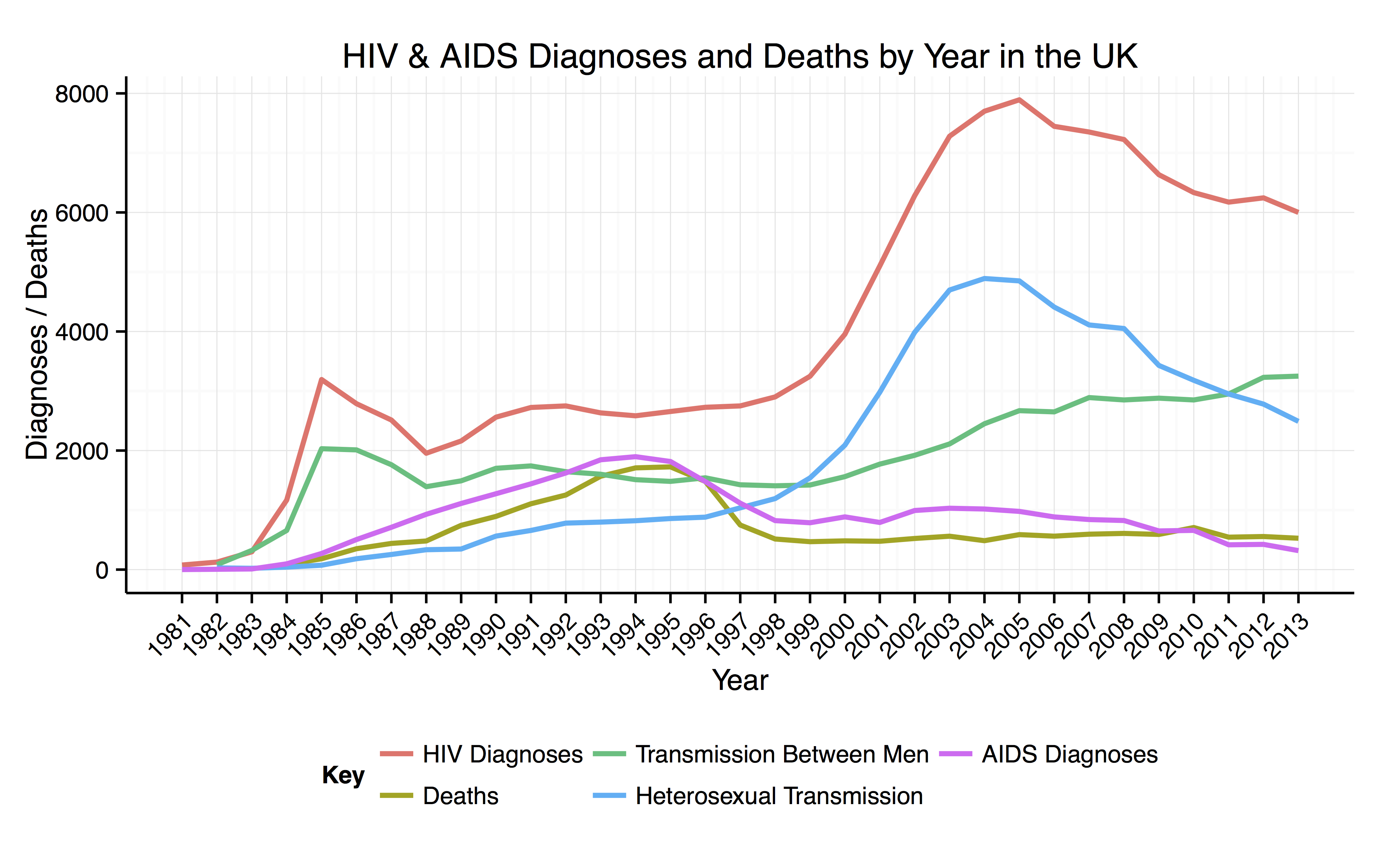
HIV & AIDS Diagnoses and Deaths by Year in the UK

HIV treatment is available free of charge in the UK and as a result 96% of diagnosed are receiving treatment and of those 94% have a suppressed viral load making them very unlikely to pass on the infection. In 2015, less than 1% of people living with a diagnosed HIV infection in the UK died (cause of death is uncertain and may not be HIV-related). All-cause mortality for ages 15–59 in people living with HIV was 5.7 per 1000 compared to 1.7 for the UK population as a whole. People newly diagnosed with HIV today can expect to have a normal life expectancy if they are diagnosed on time and on effective treatment.

In 2017, 39% adults seen for HIV care were 50 years of age or older. This is partly due to improvements to life expectancy for people living with HIV as well as increasing numbers of people acquiring HIV later in life.

== Pre-exposure prophylaxis ==
Access to pre-exposure prophylaxis ("PrEP"), using a drug which can prevent HIV infection, on the National Health Service is partially limited. It was available to high-risk individuals in England through the IMPACT trial, which had a cohort size of 26,000. This was made available following the PROUD trial, a randomised control trial and a high-court battle in 2016. Use of PrEP in London, both as part of a trial and from private purchases, was partially credited in a drop in diagnoses among men who have sex with men, after a five-year plateau in diagnoses.

In Scotland, England, Wales and Northern Ireland PrEP is available free on the NHS from sexual health clinics for those deemed at high risk of acquisition.

Sexual health specialist Mags Portman was credited in making PrEP more accessible to gay and bisexual men in the UK. In October 2018, the Terrence Higgins Trust established the Mags Portman PrEP Access Fund to provide PrEP to those in England and Northern Ireland who cannot afford it. The fund has a maximum size of 1,000 users and was available until the end of 2020.

== Timeline ==
1979, June: a sample shows a UK transmission to a haemophiliac in the UK.

1981, 12 December: The Lancet publishes a case report of a 49-year-old man who had died in Brompton hospital due to an AIDS related illness in October - the first death in the UK. He was homosexual and a frequent visitor to the United States.

It was finally revealed in November 2021, by the ITV Tonight programme that this first patient was called John Eaddie, a 49 year old guest house proprietor from Harrogate - 40 years after the first mention of a case in a medical journal. Painstaking work from the ITV Tonight team matched a death certificate from 1981, which included the same details revealed in the Lancet - a 49 year old man, dying in the Royal Brompton Hospital of Pneumocystis pneumonia.

1982, 4 July: Terry Higgins dies of an AIDS related illness – leading to the establishment of the Terrence Higgins Trust by his partner and friends.

1983: Scottish AIDS Monitor founded to monitor and raise awareness of HIV/AIDS in Scotland.

1983, 25 April: BBC broadcasts "Killer in the Village" as part of its Horizon series. The documentary describes the illnesses affecting patients and looks at theories and early research into AIDS. It includes interviews with Linda Laubenstein, Alvin Friedman-Kien, James W. Curran, Michael S. Gottlieb and Bobbi Campbell.

1985: 58 AIDS-related deaths had been recorded in Britain, according to the current affairs series TV Eye, broadcast in 1985. In October, a man with AIDS is detained under the Public Health (Infectious Diseases) Regulations 1985, marking their first and only use.

1986, 24 March: BBC broadcasts "AIDS: A Strange and Deadly Virus" as part of its Horizon series. The documentary looks at early work to identify the virus and experimental use of AZT.

1986: Crusaid established.

1987: Positively Women established.

1987, 9 April: Diana, Princess of Wales, opens the Broderip Ward, a dedicated ward at Middlesex Hospital for the treatment of HIV patients, and notably shakes the hands of AIDS patients without wearing gloves.

1987: The UK Government launched "AIDS: Don't Die of Ignorance", a major public information campaign. A leaflet about AIDS was delivered to every household in the UK, which warned that it is impossible to tell who is infected with the virus.

1988, September: London Lighthouse opened.

1991, 24 November: Queen star Freddie Mercury dies of AIDS, just one day after he announced he had the condition.

1992: Gay Men Fighting AIDS (GMFA) launched.

1994: Scottish Voluntary HIV and AIDS Forum (HIV Scotland) set up in Edinburgh to make policy and advocacy changes and provide support for people living with HIV in Scotland.

1994: Healthy Gay Manchester established (taken over by LGBT Foundation in 2000).

1995: Project for HIV and Aids Care and Education (PHACE West) established to provide HIV support, advice and health services for the West of Scotland.

1996: Triple combination therapy (HAART) becomes standard treatment, reducing the death rate.

2003, March : The National AIDS Trust launched a campaign challenging HIV stigma.

2010, 8 April: The Equality Act 2010 qualifies anyone with HIV as disabled and so gives protection against discrimination.

2012: 1 October: Free HIV treatment in England extended to include non-resident overseas visitors.

2012, 23 November: First National HIV Testing Week.

2013, April: HIV Prevention England started a two-year campaign funded by the Department of Health communicating messages about HIV testing and condoms to Africans and MSM.

2015, April: First home testing kits become available, after being legalised in April 2014.

2015, 9 September: Results announced of PROUD study, testing the effectiveness of PrEP on reducing HIV infections in 544 participants.

2016: Results of PARTNER Study show that a person living with HIV, who is on treatment and whose virus is undetectable cannot pass the virus on to anyone else. The 'U=U' campaign and Terrence Higgins Trust's 'Can't Pass It On' campaigns followed shortly after. The PARTNER Study followed other research and studies, such as the Swiss Statement, which provided similar evidence of HIV not being able to be passed on under these stated circumstances.

2017, July: PrEP made available free on the NHS in Scotland.

2017, 3 August: NHS announced trial of PrEP for 10,000 people over three years.

2019, 1 January: NHS announced to increase IMPACT trial size to 26,000.

2019, 22 July: Independent HIV Commission to end new HIV transmissions in England by 2030 launches.

2020, March: UK government announces PrEP will be made freely available in England from April 2020 to anyone at risk.

2021, 1 December: the UK Ministry of Defence announces a commitment to ensuring being HIV+ no longer excludes anyone from joining the armed forces. Any candidates taking PrEP would be welcomed and serving armed forces personnel with HIV are recognised as fully fit.

2022: Accident and Emergency treatment will have opt out testing for blood bourne viruses, a pilot study identified 65 people with HIV not undergoing treatment. In 2023 it was decided to extend this to all hospital settings.

== See also ==
- National AIDS Trust
- Terrence Higgins Trust
- Avert
- George House Trust
- GMFA
- Scottish AIDS Monitor
- Ensuring Positive Futures
- Tainted blood scandal (United Kingdom)
- Health in the United Kingdom
