= Ensuring Positive Futures =

British HIV/AIDS employability programme

Ensuring Positive Futures (EPF) is an employability programme based in the UK that aims to support people living with HIV in the workplace.

It is a partnership of HIV organisations, employers, trades unions and government which works together to challenge the stigma and discrimination that often accompanies HIV. It has been seen that with effective HIV medication, people living with HIV can live and work just like anyone else.

The lead organisation in the partnership is the UK Coalition of People Living with HIV and AIDS, a charity which is run by and for people living with HIV, which aims to empower individuals who are HIV positive, and to give them a voice.

The programme offers advice and guidance on employment issues, such as getting back into work, or staying in employment, and advice for people who may be facing discrimination. It also runs awareness training for employers, and lobbies government and runs campaigns to raise awareness of HIV in employment.

The programme is funded by the European Social Fund as part of the EQUAL programme.

== See also ==
- HIV/AIDS in the United Kingdom
