= Back in the Day (game show) =

British game show

- Presented by: Clive Anderson
- Country of origin: United Kingdom
- Original language: English
- No. of series: 1
- No. of episodes: 40

Production
- Running time: 30mins (inc. adverts)
- Production company: Celador

Original release
- Network: Channel 4
- Release: 31 May – 7 October 2005

Back in the Day is a British game show that was broadcast on Channel 4 in 2005. It is hosted by Clive Anderson.
