= Clive Anderson =

English presenter (born 1952)

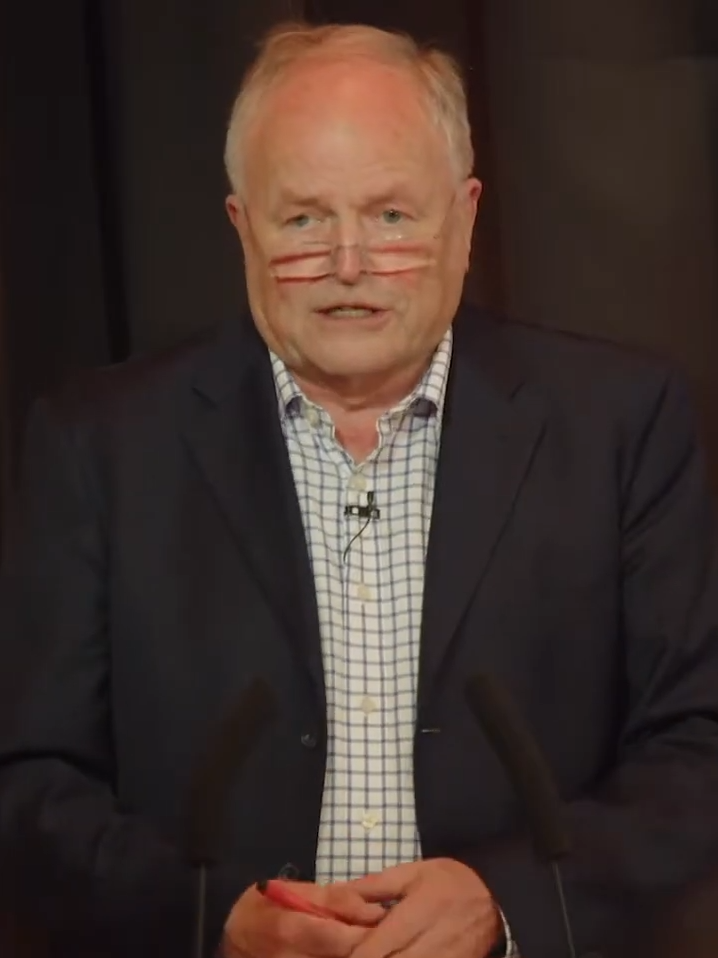
- Anderson in 2023
- Born: Clive Stuart Anderson; 10 December 1952 (age 73); Stanmore, London, England
- Education: Selwyn College, Cambridge (BA)
- Occupations: Comedy author, game show host, barrister, radio presenter, television presenter
- Years active: 1979–present
- Known for: Hosting Whose Line Is It Anyway?, Clive Anderson Talks Back and Clive Anderson All Talk
- Spouse: Jane Anderson (m. 1981)
- Children: 3

Clive Stuart Anderson (born 10 December 1952) is an English comedian, presenter, writer and former barrister. Winner of a British Comedy Award in 1991, Anderson began experimenting with comedy and writing comedic scripts during his 15-year legal career. He then became host of Whose Line Is It Anyway?, initially a radio show on BBC Radio 4 in 1988, before moving to television on Channel 4 from 1988 to 1999. He was also host of his own chat show Clive Anderson Talks Back, which changed its name to Clive Anderson All Talk in 1996, from 1989 to 1999. He has also hosted many radio programmes and made guest appearances on Have I Got News for You, Mock the Week and QI.

== Early life ==
Anderson's father was Scottish, his mother was English, and his parents met while serving in the RAF. He was educated at Stanburn Primary School and Harrow County School for Boys then a grammar school which closed in 1975. His group of contemporaries included Geoffrey Perkins and Michael Portillo. His father, originally from Glasgow, was a bank clerk who moved to Highbury and was promoted to manager of the Bradford & Bingley Building Society, Wembley branch in 1938. Anderson attended Selwyn College, Cambridge, where, from 1974 to 1975, he was President of the Cambridge Footlights. He was called to the bar at the Middle Temple in 1976 and became a practising barrister, specialising in criminal law. While still practising law, he continued performing, including taking a show to the Edinburgh Fringe in 1981 with Griff Rhys Jones.

== Career ==
=== Television ===
Anderson was involved in the fledgling alternative comedy scene in the early 1980s and was the first act to appear at The Comedy Store when it opened in 1979. He made his name as host of the original UK version of the improvised television comedy show Whose Line Is It Anyway?, which ran for 10 series on Channel 4 from 1988 to 1999.

Anderson hosted his own chat show Clive Anderson Talks Back, which ran for ten series on Channel 4 from 1989 to 1996. The show then moved to the BBC, with the name changed to Clive Anderson All Talk, running for four series from 1996 to 1999. In one incident in 1997, Anderson was deserted by his guests, the Bee Gees, after he made several digs at them and their music. He once had a glass of water poured over his head by a perturbed Richard Branson, to which he replied, "I'm used to that; I've flown Virgin." When singer and actress Cher appeared on the show, Anderson alluded to her alleged cosmetic surgery, asking her "You look like a million dollars – is that how much it cost?" He also said to author and politician Jeffrey Archer, in response to his derogatory comment about the show, "You're a critic too... there's no beginning to your talents." Archer retorted that "The old ones are always the best" for Anderson to reply "Yes, I've read your books."

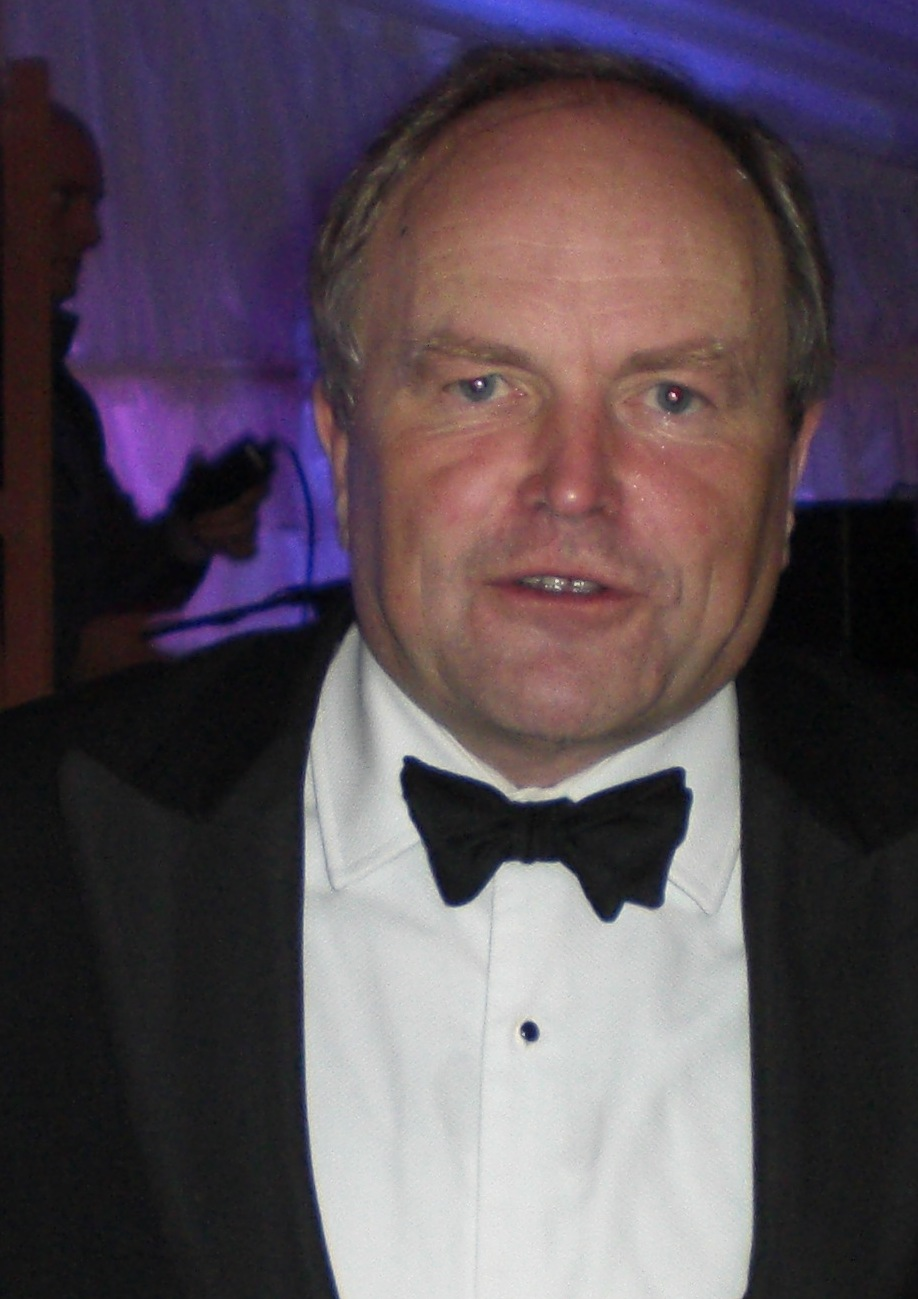
Anderson at Selwyn May Ball 2008

He has made ten appearances on Have I Got News for You. In 1996, a heated exchange occurred on the show when he joked to fellow guest Piers Morgan that the Daily Mirror was now, thanks to Morgan (then its editor), almost as good as The Sun. When asked by Morgan, "What do you know about editing newspapers?" he swiftly replied "About as much as you do." Anderson has also frequently appeared on QI. In 2007, he featured as a regular panellist on the ITV comedy show News Knight. From 2019 to 2020 he co-hosted the television series Mystic Britain on the Sky television channel Smithsonian.

In 2005, he presented the short-lived quiz Back in the Day for Channel 4. On 25 February 2008, he started to present Brainbox Challenge, a new game show, for BBC Two. Later that year, he presented a talent show-themed reality TV series produced by the BBC entitled Maestro, starring eight celebrities. In 2009, Anderson was the television host of the BBC's Last Night of the Proms.

In November 2023, Anderson appeared on TV game show Richard Osman's House of Games, winning the show by one point.

=== Radio ===
Anderson presented the legal show Unreliable Evidence on BBC Radio 4, which ran from 2007 until 2019. He also covered the Sunday morning 11 a.m. to 1 p.m. show on BBC Radio 2 until the end of January 2008.

In early 1988, Anderson hosted the original radio version of Whose Line Is It Anyway?, which ran for six episodes on BBC Radio 4 before the show moved to television later that year.

It was announced in April 2008 that Anderson, who had previously filled in for host Ned Sherrin from 2006 until Sherrin's death in 2007, would be taking over as permanent host of Loose Ends. He also hosted six series of Clive Anderson's Chat Room on BBC Radio 2 from 2004 to 2009. He has appeared on BBC Radio 4's The Unbelievable Truth hosted by David Mitchell.

Anderson also presented the radio show The Guessing Game on BBC Radio Scotland. He has also appeared on BBC Radio 5 Live's Fighting Talk.

=== Comedy and newspaper writing ===
Anderson is a comedy sketch writer who has written for Frankie Howerd, Not the Nine O'Clock News, and Griff Rhys Jones and Mel Smith. One of his early comedy writing projects was Black Cinderella Two Goes East with Rory McGrath for BBC Radio 4 in 1978. As well as writing comedy, Anderson is a frequent contributor to newspapers and was a regular columnist for The Sunday Correspondent.

== Personal life ==
Anderson lives in Highbury, north London, with his consultant wife, Jane Anderson, a physician who has spent her career in managing HIV/AIDS. The couple have three children.

He supports Arsenal and Rangers football teams. He is president of the Woodland Trust and vice patron of the Solicitors' Benevolent Association, a registered charity.

== Awards ==
The show Whose Line Is It Anyway? won a BAFTA award in 1990. Later, Anderson won both the "Top Entertainment Presenter" and "Top Radio Comedy Personality" at the British Comedy Awards in 1991. In 2023 he was made an honorary fellow of Selwyn College, Cambridge.
