= Brainbox Challenge =

- Genre: Game show
- Presented by: Clive Anderson
- Narrated by: Sarah Parnell
- Country of origin: United Kingdom
- Original language: English
- No. of series: 1
- No. of episodes: 20

Production
- Running time: 30 minutes
- Production company: BBC Manchester

Original release
- Network: BBC Two
- Release: 25 February – 21 March 2008

Brainbox Challenge is a British game show that aired on BBC Two from 25 February to 21 March 2008 and is hosted by Clive Anderson.

== Format ==
The show features rounds including "Memory", "Language", "Visual and Spatial", "Numerical" and "Coding".

Each episode features five head-to-head challenges based on these different skills. The winner of each challenge becomes the "Brainbox Champion" and is shown a picture of their next challenger, along with their name, age, and occupation. The champion is then given the chance to leave with their winnings ("take the cheque") or face that opponent ("take the challenge"). If they choose to take the challenge, they risked losing some or all of the money they had won if defeated by challengers. However, any money won in the bonus round was safe. If they chose to take the cheque, the new challenger would take the champion's podium, and a successive challenger would be introduced.

The theoretical maximum winnings for any contestant were £13,000.
