= St Joseph's Catholic College =

Location
- Ocotal Way; Swindon, Wiltshire, SN3 3LR; England
- Coordinates: 51.5646°N 1.7645°W

Information
- Type: Academy
- Religious affiliation: Roman Catholic
- Established: 1958
- Department for Education URN: 136980 Tables
- Ofsted: Reports
- Principal: Jerry Giles
- Gender: Coeducational
- Age: 11 to 16
- Website: www.stjosephscollege.net

St. Joseph's Catholic College (formerly St Joseph's Comprehensive School) is a secondary school in Swindon, England. The school opened in 1958 and was the town's first Catholic school, offering education to students aged 11 to 16. Today it remains the only Roman Catholic secondary education provider in Swindon, but is open to other religions. It is a mixed sex school with c.1,370 pupils and has had academy status since August 2011. The school's core values are; Respect, Inclusivity, Equality, Nurturing, Growth, and Accountability.

== Pupils ==
As the only Catholic Secondary school in Swindon, it is culturally diverse, taking pupils from all over Swindon and the surrounding villages. There are five Catholic feeder schools in Swindon: Holy Cross, Holy Family, Holy Rood, St Catherine's and St Mary's. The school ceased to provide post-16 education effective September 2017, with the Year 12 class of September 2016 remaining as the final year of post-16 education, to leave the school in the summer of 2018.

== Ofsted ==
The College was rated as good in all areas by Ofsted in its report published in 2014, and this assessment was confirmed at a short inspection in January 2018.

== Governance ==
Jerry Giles, a former Ofsted inspector, is school Principal, having joined St. Josephs as Deputy Headteacher in September 2014. Jessica Higgins is the Chair of Governors.

== Notable alumni ==
- Andrew Pierce, journalist, broadcaster and Consultant Editor of the Daily Mail
- Raymond Edward O'Sullivan, song-writer and singer, known as Gilbert O'Sullivan
