= 2023 in Scottish television =

This is a list of events taking place in 2023 relating to Scottish television.

== Events ==
=== January ===
- 1 January – BBC Scotland's Hogmanay is hosted by Edith Bowman to see in the New Year.

=== April ===
- 13 April – Representatives from BBC Scotland, STV, Viaplay and the Scottish FA meet to discuss the broadcasting of men's football in Scotland, the rights of which are owned by Viaplay until 2028. The meeting, to discuss showing free-to-air matches, ends without resolution, but is described by Gavin Newlands MP as encouraging.

== Ongoing television programmes ==
=== 1960s ===
- Reporting Scotland (1968–1983; 1984–present)

=== 1970s ===
- Sportscene (1975–present)
- Landward (1976–present)
- The Beechgrove Garden (1978–present)

=== 1990s ===
- Eòrpa (1993–present)

=== 2000s ===
- River City (2002–2026)
- The Adventure Show (2005–present)
- An Là (2008–present)
- Trusadh (2008–present)
- STV Rugby (2009–2010; 2011–present)
- STV News at Six (2009–present)

=== 2010s ===
- Scotland Tonight (2011–present)
- Shetland (2013–present)
- Scot Squad (2014–present)
- Still Game (2016–present)
- Two Doors Down (2016–present)
- The Nine (2019–present)
- Debate Night (2019–present)
- A View from the Terrace (2019–present)

== See also ==
- 2023 in Scotland
