= Jane Anderson (physician) =

British physician (born 1952)

Jane Anderson CBE
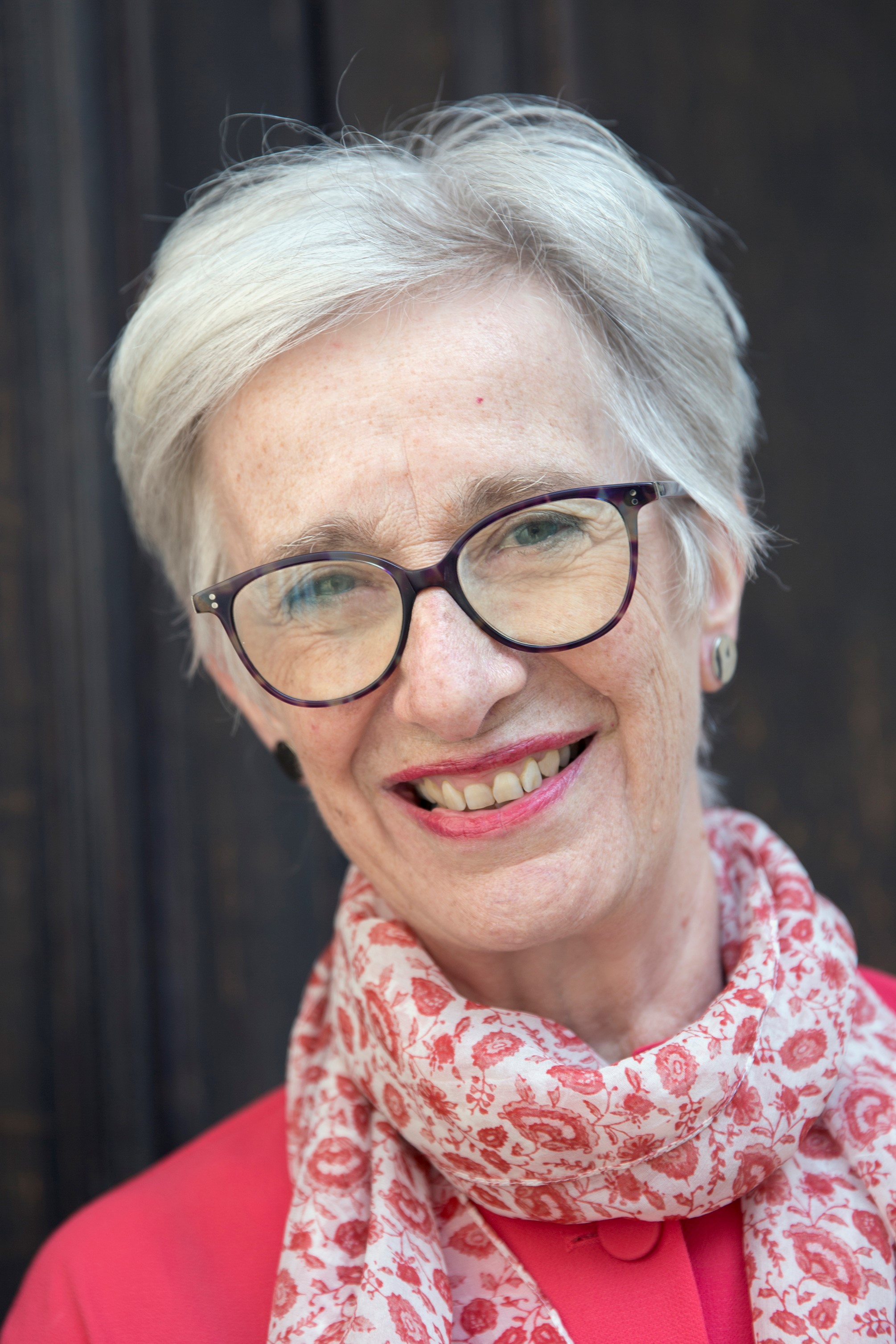
- Anderson in 2021
- Born: 23 December 1952 (age 73); Swindon, Wiltshire, England
- Education: Queen Elizabeth College; St Mary's Hospital Medical School
- Spouse: Clive Anderson
- Scientific career
- Workplaces: Barts and The London School of Medicine and Dentistry; Homerton University Hospital

Jane Anderson CBE (born 23 December 1952) is a British physician who specialises in the management of HIV/AIDS. She has served as an expert advisor for Public Health England and is Immediate Past Chair of the National AIDS Trust.

== Early life and education ==
Anderson was born in Swindon, Wiltshire, on 23 December 1952. She originally trained as a nutritionist at Queen Elizabeth College. In an interview with The BMJ Anderson revealed that as a teenager she had underperformed in her A-levels and had initially not secured a place at medical school. Eventually she was accepted as a mature student to St Mary's Hospital Medical School. She started work as a research assistant in a metabolic unit. She started her professional career in the 1980s, in the early days of the AIDS epidemic.

== Research and career ==
Anderson has been a visiting fellow at King's Fund. She has dedicated her career to improving the long-term health outcomes of people living with HIV. In the early nineties Anderson joined Barts and The London, where she worked as a consultant physician, and held a joint position at Homerton University Hospital. Anderson serves as director of the Homerton University Hospital NHS Foundation Trust Centre for the Study of Sexual Health and HIV. She holds honorary professorial appointments at University College London and Queen Mary University of London where she is a member of the SHARE Research Collaborative for Health Equity In 2005 she presented evidence before the government, arguing that long-stay visitors to the United Kingdom, undocumented people and those refused indefinite leave to remain should not be charged for HIV care.

Anderson has held various senior public health positions in the United Kingdom, including leading the Public Health England HIV, Sexual and Reproductive Health in the Wellbeing Directorate from 2013 to 2016. In 2021 she was elected master of the Worshipful Society of Apothecaries. In 2016 she was made chair of the National AIDS Trust. Anderson has served as the co-chair of the London Fast Track Cities Initiative since 2018. Between 2023 and 2025 she was Chair of the charity Paintings in Hospitals, until its merger with the charity CW+. Anderson serves as a Trustee to the Chelsea Physic Garden and chairs the Garden's Advisory Committee.

== Personal life ==
She is married to the TV and radio presenter, author, comedian and former barrister Clive Anderson; they have three children.

== Awards and honours ==
- 2012 Appointed chair of the British HIV Association
- 2014 100 Leading Ladies
- 2015 Appointed Commander of the Order of the British Empire (CBE) in the 2015 Birthday Honours for services to HIV Medicine and Sexual Health Research
- 2016 Appointed chair of the National AIDS Trust

== Select publications ==
- Application of machine-learning algorithms to identify the key determinants of risk for HIV, hepatitis C and hepatitis B in primary care settings Manley, Harrison, Werner Leber, Kelvin Smith, Hamzah Z. Farooq, Manish Pareek, Rebecca F. Baggaley, Jane Anderson et al. https://link.springer.com/article/10.1186/s12879-026-13247-0 Retrieved August 19th 2026
- Recommendations for defining preventable HIV-related mortality for public health monitoring in the era of Getting to Zero: an expert consensus. Croxford SE, Martin V, Lucas SB, Miller RF, Post FA, Anderson J, Apea VJ, Asboe D, Brough G, Chadwick DR, Collins S. The Lancet HIV. 2023 Jan . retrieved 8 February 2023
- Consensus statement on the role of health systems in advancing the long-term well-being of people living with HIV. Lazarus JV, Safreed-Harmon K, Kamarulzaman A, Anderson J, Leite RB, Behrens G, Bekker LG, Bhagani S, Brown D, Brown G, Buchbinder S. Nature communications. 2021 Jul 16;12(1):4450. Retrieved 8 February 2023.
- 4."Treatment of HIV-1 infected adults with antiretroviral therapy (2008)". www.bhiva.org.
- May, Margaret T.; Gompels, Mark; Delpech, Valerie; Porter, Kholoud; Orkin, Chloe; Kegg, Stephen; Hay, Phillip; Johnson, Margaret; Palfreeman, Adrian; Gilson, Richard; Chadwick, David (15 May 2014). "Impact on life expectancy of HIV-1 positive individuals of CD4+ cell count and viral load response to antiretroviral therapy". AIDS. 28 (8): 1193–1202. doi:10.1097/QAD.0000000000000243. ISSN 0269-9370. PMC 4004637. PMID 24556869.
- Peltzer, Karl; Friend-du Preez, Natalie; Ramlagan, Shandir; Anderson, Jane (5 March 2010). "Antiretroviral treatment adherence among HIV patients in KwaZulu-Natal, South Africa". BMC Public Health. 10 (1): 111. doi:10.1186/1471-2458-10-111. ISSN 1471-2458. PMC 2837855. PMID 20205721.
