= Mags Portman =

British medical doctor (1974–2019)

Margaret Denise Portman (27 May 1974 – 6 February 2019) was a British medical doctor who specialised in sexual health. She was an advocate for pre-exposure prophylaxis medication (PrEP) to prevent new HIV cases.

== Early life and education ==
Portman was born on 27 May 1974 in Leeds.

Portman completed her MBChB in Glasgow in 1998, qualifying as a general practitioner in 2003. She then received her Certificate of Completion of Training (a UK medical specialist training) in 2014.

== Career ==
Portman was called a "pioneer within the sexual health sector". She advocated for access and usage of pre-exposure prophylaxis medication (PrEP) to reduce incidence of HIV/AIDS in the United Kingdom. Portman has been attributed with preventing thousands of new HIV diagnoses through her work ensuring PrEP accessibility.

In 2014, Portman began working at the Royal London Hospital as an HIV consultant. While there, she worked on the PROUD study, which demonstrated that a daily dose of the drug Emtricitabine/tenofovir (brand name Truvada) was effective at preventing HIV infection in gay and bisexual men. She joined Mortimer Market Centre, part of Central and North West London Foundation Trust (CNWL) in September 2015.

After HIV activist Greg Owen launched the website IWantPrEPNow—a site where those in the United Kingdom could order generic PrEP, which was not available in-country—Portman became involved with the project. She assisted in testing the generic pills that were ordered to ensure that none were inactive "dummy" pills.

She appeared prominently in a 2017 BBC documentary, The People vs the NHS: Who Gets the Drugs?, which followed the aftermath of the National Health Service's (NHS) 2016 decision to not fund PrEP. Doctors, including Portman, as well as activists and AIDS charities worked together to lobby for the overturn of the decision.

== Personal life ==
Portman had a husband, Martin. Together, they had two children.

Portman was diagnosed with mesothelioma in January 2017. She suspected that her cancer was a result of asbestos exposure from working in a hospital. She died of her illness on 6 February 2019 at the age of 44.

== Honors and legacy ==
In October 2018, the Terrence Higgins Trust established the Mags Portman PrEP Access Fund. The Fund's purpose was to provide PrEP to those in England and Northern Ireland who could not afford it. The PrEP Access Fund closed in 2020 as PrEP became available via the NHS.
