= National AIDS Trust v NHS Commissioning Board =

2016 English Court of Appeal case

- Court: High Court of Justice, Court of Appeal of England and Wales
- Decided: 2 August 2016 (High Court); 10 November 2016 (Appeal)
- Citation: [2016] EWHC 2005 (Admin) (High Court)

Court membership
- Judges sitting: Mr Justice Green (High Court); Lady Justice King (Appeal); Lord Justice Longmore (Appeal); Lord Justice Underhill (Appeal)

National AIDS Trust v NHS Commissioning Board, [2016] EWHC 2005 (Admin), was a court case before the High Court of Justice seeking judicial review regarding National Health Service funding for pre-exposure prophylaxis.

== Facts ==
The provision of pre-exposure prophylaxis (PrEP) in the British National Health Service to prevent HIV infection has been the subject of much controversy. AIDS campaigners have lobbied for the NHS to approve the treatment to prevent the spread of HIV among members of high-risk groups such as gay men. NHS management considered PrEP to be a preventive treatment that they were not legally able to provide funding for, but should instead be funded by local councils.

The issue was taken by the National AIDS Trust to a judicial review by the High Court.

== Judgment ==
=== High Court ===
In 2016, the High Court determined that NHS England had the power to provide PrEP treatment to these groups. Following the defeat at trial, NHS England announced a plan to appeal the judgment in the Court of Appeal, while also making plans to prepare to implement the wider use of PrEP. To ensure it had sufficient funding to cover the £10M–20M annual cost of PrEP if it was prioritised, NHS England announced that it could no longer guarantee it would be able to commission nine other treatments and services which it had provisionally earmarked for funding.

=== Court of Appeal ===
NHS England lost the appeal, with Lady Justice Eleanor King and Lord Justices Andrew Longmore and Nicholas Underhill finding in favour of the National AIDS Trust on 10 November 2016, with Public Health England announcing a 3-year large-scale trial seeking to enroll over 10,000 people a few weeks later. Subsequent freedom of information requests showed that NHS England spent over £100,000 fighting the case, not including NAT's legal fees, estimated at a further £8,000.

== See also ==
- Pre-exposure prophylaxis
- Emtricitabine/tenofovir (Truvada)
- HIV in the United Kingdom
