= GMFA =

British health charity

GMFA - the gay men's health project
- Abbreviation: GMFA
- Formation: 1992
- Type: Gay men's health project
- Purpose: Health promotion
- Headquarters: United Kingdom
- Location: United Kingdom
- Region served: United Kingdom
- Official language: English
- Parent organization: LGBT HERO
- Staff: 5
- Volunteers: 180
- Website: www.lgbthero.org.uk/Pages/Category/gmfa

GMFA (originally Gay Men Fighting AIDS) is a British health promotion charitable project that campaigns to improve gay men’s health. Its core interventions tackle issues including HIV, AIDS and other areas of sexual health. GMFA is part of LGBT HERO, the health equality and rights organisation for LGBTQ+ people.

== History ==
GMFA was founded in 1992 by a group of gay men who felt that there was not enough HIV prevention work being specifically targeted at gay men.

Originally named Gay Men Fighting AIDS, GMFA’s initial remit was to campaign for more targeted HIV prevention work aimed at gay men, and to raise awareness of HIV amongst gay men.

In 2011, the organisation changed its name to Health Equality and Rights Organisation, known publicly as LGBT HERO. GMFA remained as a primary brand within the organisation charged with working towards ending HIV, stopping HIV stigma and tackling other health and social inequalities that affects gay and bisexual men.

GMFA uses a model of community mobilisation and peer education, with gay men playing a central role in the design and delivery of interventions. In 2001, GMFA merged with the Black gay men’s group Big Up and, in 2002, GMFA broadened its remit to include all health issues which disproportionately affect gay men over other populations. As a result, the organisation changed its mission statement in 2002 and 'Gay Men Fighting AIDS' became 'GMFA - the gay men's health charity'. In 2017, as LGBT HERO changed GMFA - the gay men's health charity to GMFA - the gay men's health project as the organisation grew into an LGBT organization.

Many of GMFA's archive materials are held by the Bishopsgate Institute.

== Mission ==
“Improving gay men’s health by increasing the control they have over their own lives.”

== Principles and values ==
GMFA has eight principles upon which it is based and claims to be measured:

1. Interventions should be evidence-based.
2. HIV-prevention interventions must contribute towards the targets set out within Making It Count, the planning framework for HIV health promotion recommended by the Department of Health.
3. A project must not promote the health of one person over another.
4. Health promotion should empower people rather than reduce their choices.
5. Interventions should be of the greatest value to gay men within the resources available.
6. Services should be provided on an equitable rather than equal basis. Sub-populations of gay men have different levels of need and so our work should attempt to reduce health inequalities amongst gay men.
7. All people, regardless of their HIV status, are entitled to a satisfying sex life.
8. All people, regardless of their sexual behaviour, sexual identity or HIV status, are entitled to the same rights and respect as all other people.

== Volunteer leadership ==
GMFA is a volunteer-led project. Volunteers lead the project both by being elected members of the Board of Directors and by contributing to projects as members of the groups who develop projects.

Volunteers are mainly recruited through promotion on all GMFA interventions, and undergo an induction process. The organisation welcomes volunteers from all sections of the community, although the majority of volunteers are gay men. The volunteer base is made up of HIV-negative and HIV-positive people.

== Funding and partnerships ==
GMFA's work is mainly funded through grants and foundations, though it relies on community support to continue its work.

== Interventions ==
GMFA’s interventions for gay men have included advertising campaigns, leaflets, postcards and booklets; FS, its health magazine, distributed nationally in gay venues and GU clinics; and national and London-based courses covering sex education, life skills and smoking cessation. In addition, GMFA creates targeted sexual health interventions for black gay men and HIV positive gay men.

GMFA’s interventions have included: The Arse Class, a group-work course, which teaches gay men how to keep sex fun, safer and pleasurable. The first course ran in cities across the UK in 2007; Its Responsibility advertising campaign in 2005, encouraging men to take responsibility for safer sex; FS magazine, (Fit and Sexy) which is available for free in gay venues, as a download and in GUM clinics across the UK; and In The Family, a two-volume celebration of the achievements of men and women who have helped to build the Black gay community in London.

In November 2010 the "Count me in" campaign to stop the spread of HIV was launched as that year's campaign for UNAIDS's World AIDS Day. The campaign was endorsed by the Lib-Con Minister for Equality Lynne Featherstone, via a Home Office video and a transcript and related statement.

GMFA's outreach work at the gay cruising area of Hampstead Heath in the 1990s is referenced in one of Armistead Maupin's Tales of the City novels.

GMFA makes use of various social media, including Twitter (twitter/GMFA_UK), Facebook with its own GMFA page and Big-Up pages, and a blog called "Outspoken On Health" about current topics pertinent to gay men's health.

== Celebrity supporters ==
In 2009 Joanna Lumley donated for the annual auction held at the Royal Vauxhall Tavern, which followed the very popular annual sports day. In 2010 Kylie Minogue donated a signed CD of "All the Lovers" and Ben Cohen a signed jockstrap and framed T-shirt for the auction; Ben also issued a supportive statement and featured in FS magazine later the same year.
