= Greg Owen (activist) =

British HIV/AIDS drug access activist

Greg Owen is a UK-born activist who started a website to make generic pre-exposure prophylaxis medication (PrEP) accessible to prevent HIV infection.

== Early life ==
Owen was the eldest of six children; he grew up in Belfast, Northern Ireland. He attended a drama college in London, from which he graduated in 2001.

== PrEP advocacy ==
Owen has been called "one of the U.K.’s most vocal proponents of PrEP", describing himself as the "poster boy for PrEP in the UK". In 2015, Owen met Alex Craddock, who was taking PrEP obtained while living in New York. While PrEP was accessible in the US, it was not yet available in the UK. Owen was interested in taking PrEP, so he first went to take an HIV test. The test confirmed that he was positive for the virus. Owen was frustrated that PrEP, which could have prevented him from getting the virus, was not widely available for sale in the UK.

Owen and Craddock launched a website in October 2015, I Want Prep Now, so that others would have the opportunity to buy PrEP. Through their site, customers could purchase a generic version of the drug Truvada for a tenth of the cost—around US$67 per month. At the time, only one clinic in the UK was able to legally distribute the drug, costing $700 for a month's supply.

British sexual health specialist Mags Portman heard about Owen's website, and got in contact with him. Owen decided that his website and PrEP outreach needed credibility and visibility; he described its early days as "the blind leading the blind". Portman sought the opinion of the General Medical Council, which directed that a clinician's responsibility was to provide the best care for their patients, regardless of what was commissioned. Sexual health clinics began offering blood and urine tests to those purchasing the generic PrEP to provide assurance that they were buying the real drug instead of dummy pills.

I Want Prep Now grew continuously in web traffic as the National Health Service's (NHS) decision not to fund PrEP went through legal challenges. HIV-related charities began to coordinate their actions against the NHS in a series of meetings. Owen was the only activist invited to these meetings, as "every HIV specialist knew that he was the main link to thousands of people wanting the drug". By the time the NHS lost in the High Court of Justice to the National AIDS Trust in August 2016, I Want Prep Now was receiving 12,000 unique visitors each month.

HIV researcher Sheena McCormack credits Owen with helping decrease the number of HIV diagnoses in the UK. From 2015–2016, the number of new diagnoses in London had decreased by 40%, while around the UK it was decreased by around a third. Owen recalls McCormack saying to him, "There are thousands of people who didn’t become HIV-positive this year because of you."

Despite the NHS decision being overturned, meaning that they now fund PrEP, Owen stated that in 2018, 10,000 people in the UK are purchasing generic prep online because they cannot get it through the NHS.

=== The People Vs The NHS: Who Gets The Drugs? ===
Pulse Films and Open University collaborated to create The People Vs The NHS: Who Gets The Drugs?, a 2018 documentary on the legal battle to make the NHS fund PrEP after their 2016 decision not to do so. Owen is featured at the "heart of the story". The documentary was co-produced by the BBC to mark the 70th anniversary of the NHS.

== Awards and honors ==
In 2016, activist and blogger Mark S. King named Owen as one of his 16 "HIV Advocates to Watch". In 2017 he was named a recipient of the first Life+ Award from Life Ball along with Will Nutland.
