= National AIDS Trust =

British HIV/AIDS charity

- Registration no.: 297977
- Revenue: £1,390,688 (2024)
- Staff: 20 (2024)
- Website: nat.org.uk

The National AIDS Trust is a United Kingdom charity "which specialises in achieving the best policy for treatment and prevention of HIV and AIDS". The Trust describes using its "expertise, research and advocacy [to] secure lasting change" for those affected by HIV.

The charity's key strategic goals are:

- to stop new HIV infections
- to champion the needs of people whose voices and experiences are too often ignored
- to protect the rights of everyone living with and at risk of HIV
- to drive engagement and activism to change attitudes to HIV

== Founding ==
The National AIDS Trust was founded October 1987 as a non-government organisation (NGO) by the UK's Department of Health, in order to deal with the escalating concern with HIV and AIDS nationally. It was funded with £500,000 of UK government money, with a matching charitable donation from Robert Maxwell arriving after some time. Its founding chair was Michael Adler, with Margaret Jay as its founding director, selected via the Medical Research Council with the encouragement of Virginia Bottomley.

Diana, Princess of Wales made a significant contribution to National AIDS Trust in her role as patron from 1991 to 1997. National AIDS Trust was one of only six charities that she formally supported at the time of her death, four as patron and two as president.

== Activities ==
Today, the Trust's funding comes from public donations, corporate supporters, grant-making trusts and foundations, and its own fundraising work – it doesn't receive funding from the UK Government. National AIDS Trust is a policy and campaigning charity, working to improve the national response to HIV through policy development, expertise and the provision of practical resources rather than through offering direct support services to people living with HIV.

Some recent National AIDS Trust successes include:

- After a seven-year campaign, National AIDS Trust secured free HIV treatment in England
- National AIDS Trust brought together a coalition of charities to end the use of pre-employment health questionnaires before the offer of a job is made, through the Equality Act 2010.
- National AIDS Trust were instrumental in securing and participating in the review which led to an overturn of the lifetime ban on gay men donating blood.
- National AIDS Trust influenced Home Office policy so that asylum seekers living with HIV who need help with accommodation will not routinely be 'dispersed' away from the area where they are attending an HIV clinic.
- The Government has announced an end to the absolute ban on HIV positive healthcare workers from doing jobs which involve 'exposure prone procedures' (e.g. dentistry, surgery). From early 2014, it will be possible for people living with HIV to work in these professions, provided they are on effective treatment with a non-detectable viral load and are monitored every three months. NAT has been calling for this change for a number of years – and we were the only charity on the expert working group which made the recommendation to change the rules, based on the most recent scientific evidence.
- National AIDS Trust lobbied the NHS to consider immediate treatment for those diagnosed with HIV because those who are on treatment suppress their viral load and cannot pass HIV on. The policy was changed, which was a contributing factor in historic drops in HIV diagnoses.
- In a much-publicised case, National AIDS Trust challenged NHS England in court over their failure to consider providing the HIV prevention drug PrEP. In 2016, NAT won their case in the High Court and won a later appeal, resulting in the IMPACT trial, which will benefit at least 10,000 at-risk patients in England. The battle for PrEP was the topic of BBC Two documentary 'The People Vs The NHS: Who Gets The Drugs?' in July 2018.
- The Trust contributed to the HIV Commission, with the goal of ending new HIV transmission in England by 2030

The National AIDS Trust is a small charity with one office found in Bethnal Green in London, and maintains a permanent staff of fewer than 20 people, and a pool of volunteers. The current chief executive as of 2024 is Robbie Currie.

An important recurring role of NAT is the annual hosting of the World AIDS Day website. National AIDS Trust develops resources each year to enable other HIV organisations to maximise the impact of World AIDS Day in the UK, which is 1 December.

National AIDS Trust is an independent charity with a board of trustees, who are responsible for the governance and direction which the charity takes. The chair of the Board since 2016 has been Professor Jane Anderson, CBE.

== See also ==
- HIV/AIDS in the United Kingdom
- National AIDS Trust v NHS Service Commissioning Board
