= UK Coalition of People Living with HIV and AIDS =

British HIV/AIDS organisation

The UK Coalition of People Living with HIV and AIDS (UKC) was a United Kingdom-based organisation. Due to debt, it ceased operations at 5 pm on 25 July 2007.

UKC was established in 1993 as a "not for profit" organisation run by and for people living with HIV. In its original form, it was led by peers who advocated on behalf of those who most required the help. The onus was on listening to what clients required and empowering them, thus giving them the skills to face further challenges rather than allowing them to become dependent of services.

Its mission was to “to ensure the diverse voices of people living with HIV and AIDS could be heard.”

It supported people living with HIV with advocacy and advice services, and later devised an employability programme called Ensuring Positive Futures which aimed to support people living with HIV in the workplace. They shared offices and resources with the Denholm Elliott Project.

Positive Nation is an HIV and sexual health magazine, now published privately but established by the Coalition and published by them until 15 May 2007 when it had an annual readership of approximately 60,000.

UKC worked closely with HIV organisations across the EU in developing European policies and programmes, in addition to those in Uganda, South Africa and Zambia.

Its structure of HIV-positive people supporting and empowering other HIV-positive people was seen by the UN and the International Labour Organization as a useful model for HIV organisations in the developing world.

An article published on 7 September 2010 by Third Sector Magazine reported that the Metropolitan Police were currently investigating allegations of fraud at the defunct charity, and that no arrests had yet been made.

== See also ==
- HIV/AIDS in the United Kingdom
