= 2023 Cannich wildfire =

2023 fire in the Scottish Highlands

Cannich wildfire
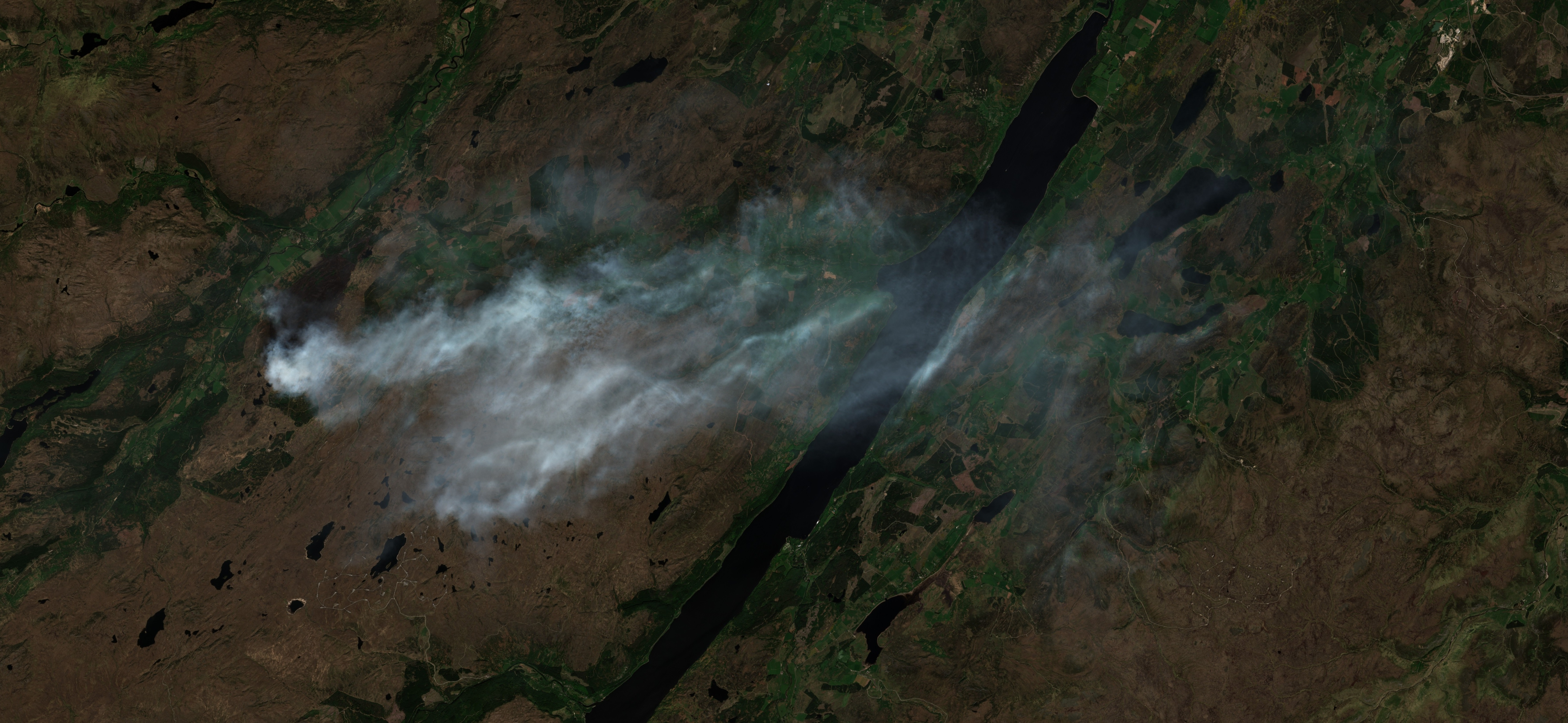
- A satellite image taken on 30 May showing smoke from the wildfire.
- Date: 28 May 2023
- Location: Cannich, Scottish Highlands, Scotland
- Coordinates: 57.31°N 4.76°W

Statistics
- Burned area: 6 sq mi (16 km^{2}; 1,600 ha)

Impacts
- Deaths: 0
- Injuries: 2

Map
- Location of the fire in the Scottish Highlands 2023 Cannich wildfire (Scotland)

On 28 May 2023, a wildfire started in the Scottish Highlands, close to the village of Cannich in the Highland council area. No fatalities were recorded, but two firefighters were injured and airlifted to hospital on 30 May when their vehicle overturned at the site; they were both discharged the following day.

== Events ==
The Scottish Fire and Rescue Service (SFRS) were alerted of a large fire at 12:46 p.m. on 28 May 2023. On 31 May, a 12 mi (19 km) long plume of smoke from the fire was detected drifting towards Loch Ness from space by NASA. At its height, nine appliances were tackling the fire, as well as a helicopter to water bomb the affected area. A 'very high' wildfire warning covering much of Scotland, which had been in place since 26 May, was extended to 5 June.

The cause of the wildfire is unknown, but the SFRS had launched an investigation into its cause. They also said it had burned through a 30 sq mi (78 km^{2}) area of scrub and woodland, which would make it the largest wildfire in the UK's history. This number was later revised by the fire service to 6 sq mi (16 km^{2}; 1,600 ha).

The fire caused lots of damage to the RSPB Corrimony nature reserve, destroying hundreds of native trees which were planted to regenerate habitats. The charity also said that many ground-nesting birds, including black grouse, had lost chicks or eggs because of the fire. Simon McLaughlin, who works at the reserve, said that fast-moving species such as spiders and lizards had survived, but others, including frogs, had been found dead. RSPB Scotland said it had still to fully assess the impact of the blaze on wildlife.

Amidst soaring forecasted temperatures, another 'very high' wildfire warning was declared by the SFRS from 7 to 10 June. In the announcement on 7 June, the fire service also said that the Cannich wildfire was still ongoing.

=== Other wildfires ===
By 11 June, another wildfire had broken out 30 miles away near Daviot. On 15 June a wildfire broke out in Dalshangan Forest near Carsphairn.

== Aftermath ==
The fire, which left the landscape blackened with ash, destroyed around 50% of the Corrimony nature reserve as well as large areas of land owned by Forestry and Land Scotland. Simon McLaughlin, who is the nature reserve's site manager, spoke at the time of his concern at the lack of chicks in the habitat, which would usually be emerging from their nests. The RSPB put together an emergency appeal to raise funds they could use to support the area's recovery, which raised over £200,000. In October 2023, RSPB Scotland said that their nature reserve was starting to recover from the fire and McLaughlin estimated that in 5-6 years it will have recovered fully.

Almost a year on from the blaze, the RSPB said that the impact of restoration efforts could be seen, and McLaughlin said that "the green shoots of recovery are already starting to show". The funds raised by the appeal were put towards replanting trees, rebuilding deer fencing and better preparing the nature reserve for future fires. Barratt Homes and conservation charity Trees for Life also helped with restoration work at the reserve.
