= John Studd (gynaecologist) =

British gynaecologist (1940–2021)

John William Winston Studd
- Born: 4 March 1940
- Died: 17 August 2021 (aged 81); London
- Education: Royal Hospital School, Birmingham University Medical School
- Occupation: Gynaecologist

John William Winston Studd (4 March 1940 – 17 August 2021) was a British gynaecologist and an academic and medical historian.

He was educated at the Royal Hospital School and at Birmingham University Medical School. After qualification he went to work in Bulawayo (then Southern Rhodesia) for several years and then returned to Birmingham where he took his MD in renal disease in pregnancy. In 1969 he started the first menopause clinic in Europe. He later worked in Salisbury, Rhodesia with Hugh Philpott with whom he devised and modified partogram creating action lines to diagnose early labour complications. He also published further work on the mechanism of labour, the effect of epidural anaesthesia on labour, and the complication of sickle cell disease in labour.

He extended his interests on hormone therapy for women, particularly relating to osteoporosis and hormone responsive depression. He was a founder of the National Osteoporosis Society. He was the first to show in randomised controlled trials that transdermal oestrogens are extremely effective in the treatment of postnatal depression, premenstrual depression, and perimenopausal depression.

He was chairman of the British Menopause Society, British Society for Psychosexual Obstetrics and Gynaecology, and International Society for Reproductive Medicine. He was a past President of the Section of Obstetrics and Gynaecology at the Royal Society of Medicine. At the Royal College of Obstetricians and Gynaecologists he was on the Council for more than 20 years.

He created the RCOG Press and has edited many of the journals. He was the creator and the editor of the successful annual publication Progress of Obstetrics and Gynaecology. He was awarded a DSc in 2001 and has published more than 500 peer-reviewed articles and written or edited more than 40 books.

Studd was visiting professor at Duke University, Harvard, Yale, Cornell, and the University of Singapore. He was awarded the prize of the Kohn Foundation for services to Osteoporosis and in 2006 was awarded the "Blair Bell" gold medal from the Royal Society of Medicine given to the doctor who has made the biggest lifetime contribution to his speciality.

He retired from clinical practice in December 2019 and died in August 2021.
