= European AIDS Clinical Society =

Not-for-profit organisation

- Founded: 1991; 35 years ago
- Headquarters: Brussels, Belgium
- Key people: Esteban Martinez (EACS President)
- Revenue: 1,888,656 (2020)
- Website: www.eacsociety.org

The European AIDS Clinical Society (EACS) is a not-for-profit organisation. Founded in 1991, the EACS has the stated mission to promote quality care, research and education of HIV and related infections with a view to reducing its burden on Europe.

The current President of the EACS is Esteban Martinez (Spain). Elected in 2022.

== European AIDS Conference ==
The EACS organises the European AIDS Conference which is held every two years and brings together scientists from across Europe to exchange the latest information regarding HIV/AIDS.
