= HIV Scotland =

Charitable organisation based in Edinburgh, Scotland

- Formation: 1995; 31 years ago
- Headquarters: HIV Scotland 18 York Place Edinburgh EH1 3EP
- Region served: Scotland
- Website: https://www.hiv.scot/
- Formerly called: Scottish Voluntary HIV & AIDS Forum

HIV Scotland was a registered charitable organisation based in Edinburgh, Scotland, established in 1995 as Scottish Voluntary HIV & AIDS Forum,. It worked to make policy and advocacy changes for people living with HIV in Scotland, PrEP users, and people at risk of HIV.

== History ==
HIV Scotland was set up as the Scottish Voluntary HIV and AIDS Forum in September 1994. Roy Kilpatrick was the founding CEO and held the position until 2011.

George Valiotis was the Chief Executive Officer of HIV Scotland between 2011 and 2018 during which a key achievement was a successful implementation strategy for a new technology called HIV pre-exposure prophylaxis (PrEP), for which the organisation was awarded the British Medical Association Medfash prize for making Scotland the first nation in the UK to have it listed on their national health service.

Nathan Sparling was the chief executive between 2018 and 2020, and helped lead the organisation through a strategic review which led to their new 11-year Strategic Plan, #ZEROHIV. He announced he was leaving HIV Scotland in December 2020.

Alastair Hudson was appointed the Interim Chief Executive Officer in 2021.

In 2023 it was announced that the charity would be shut down.
