= British HIV Association =

UK health care professional organisation

- Abbreviation: BHIVA
- Established: 1995
- Location: United Kingdom
- Chair: Yvonne Gilleece
- Website: www.bhiva.org

The British HIV Association (BHIVA) is an organisation of healthcare professionals interested in the treatment and care of people with HIV.

The current BHIVA Chair is Prof. Yvonne Gilleece.

The aims of BHIVA are, to advance:

- Promotion of good practice in the treatment of HIV
- Public education through the promotion and dissemination of research

== Conferences ==
BHIVA holds two national conferences per year, the BHIVA National Conference in April and the BHIVA Autumn Conference.

== Guidelines ==
BHIVA produce guidelines which are accredited by the UK National Institute for Health and Care Excellence (NICE).

Guidelines produced by BHIVA include:

- Pre-exposure prophylaxis (PrEP) guidelines
- Treatment of HIV-1 positive adults
- Use of Vaccines in HIV-positive adults
- Post-exposure prophylaxis (PEP) guidelines
- Opportunistic infection in HIV-positive individuals

== See also ==
- HIV/AIDS in the United Kingdom
