= Create Streets =

UK urban design practice and think tank

- Create Streets logo

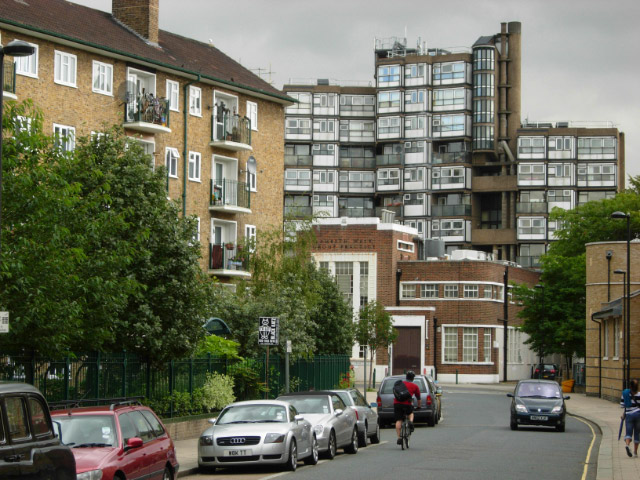
- Lambeth Walk, where Create Streets is currently based.
- Formation: 14 December 2012
- Founder: Nicholas Boys Smith
- Type: Dual structure: private limited company; charitable incorporated organisation
- Legal status: UK registered charity; UK registered company
- Purpose: Urban design research, advocacy and co-design promoting "gentle density"
- Headquarters: 81 Lambeth Walk, London, England
- Region served: United Kingdom (principal); International projects in North Africa, Western Europe, Ukraine and Middle East
- Products: Research reports; master planning; design codes; co-design; education
- Methods: Evidence-based urban design; community engagement; policy advocacy
- Key people: Nicholas Boys Smith (Chair / Founder)
- Main organ: Create Streets Foundation (charity no. 1171928); Create Streets Ltd (company no. 08332263)
- Budget: £163,302 income (Create Streets Foundation, FY 2023)
- Website: www.createstreets.com

Create Streets is a UK-based design practice, town-builder and think tank specialising in urban design, planning, and regeneration. It operates through a dual structure comprising the Create Streets Foundation (registered charity no. 1171928) and the social enterprise Create Streets Ltd (company no. 08332263). Established in 2012 by Nicholas Boys Smith MBE, Create Streets is dedicated to promoting the principle of "gentle density" — the development of street-based, low-rise, high-density neighbourhoods – through research, advocacy, master-planning, design coding and co-design.

The organisation's mission centres on demonstrating how traditional, human-scaled urban design can enhance quality of life, social cohesion, public support for development, and long-term economic value. Its research and design philosophy have had significant influence on UK housing policy, most notably through Boys Smith's role as co-chair of the Building Better, Building Beautiful Commission (2018–2020) and as interim Chair of the Office for Place (from 2023), both of which have advanced the national adoption of design codes and community-led placemaking.

== Organisational history and legal structure ==
Create Streets operates as a dual-structure organisation. Create Streets Ltd is a private limited company (no. 08332263) incorporated on 14 December 2012. It functions as a multidisciplinary urban design consultancy ("town-builder" and think-tank) and undertakes commercial master planning, design coding and planning research under the Create Streets brand. Nicholas Boys Smith set up the company after serving as a director at Lloyds Banking Group and a consultant with McKinsey & Co., and after advising George Osborne's Tax Reform Commission.

The Create Streets Foundation is a separate Charitable incorporated organisation (CIO) registered with the UK Charity Commission (charity no. 1171928). Its constitution was adopted on 28 February 2017. The Foundation's stated objects are to advance public education in subjects related to the built environment – especially links between urban form, health and community wellbeing – through research, training and dissemination of findings. In practice the foundation conducts community training (e.g. co-Design Workshops) and independent research on housing, streets and public space. Although sharing staff and leadership, the Foundation's legal status is distinct from the Ltd company, allowing it to operate as a charitable research body.

== Governance and financials ==
Create Streets Ltd is governed by a board of directors, with Nicholas Boys Smith as Founder and Chair. Other current directors include:

- David Milner, Managing director
- Eleanor Broad, Director
- Constance de Montigny, Operations Director

The board has overseen Create Streets' consultancy and research activities from its headquarters on Lambeth Walk, London. The Create Streets Foundation is governed by a board of trustees. As of 2024, the trustees listed in official filings are:

- Harry Briggs (Chair), investor (Managing Partner at OMERS Ventures).
- Robin Warwick Edwards, a chartered accountant and fund manager who, among other roles, chairs Cresta Homes PLC.
- Clare Mirfin, a partner at law firm Pinsent Masons specializing in development planning and large-scale housing projects.
- Fabian Richter, (also Treasurer of the charity) is a financial-sector executive (former director at Ruffer and Standard Life and co-founder of an investment firm) with an interest in urban planning.
- Alex Hickman, a Director and Head of Business Development at JL Partners.

Financially, the Foundation is a small charity. For the year ending 2023 it reported total income of £163,302 and expenditure of £79,997. This comprises grants, donations and consultancy income used to fund research, events and educational programs. Create Streets Ltd's accounts are filed with Companies House (latest accounts to March 2024).

== Core philosophy and research ==
Central to Create Streets' philosophy is the concept of "gentle density": creating compact, walkable neighbourhoods composed of traditional streets of terraced houses and low-rise flats, rather than concentrating development in high-rise towers. The organisation argues that such environments are more popular, healthy and economically productive. For example, it highlights surveys indicating strong public preference for houses or small-scale residential streets: one industry survey found that roughly 65–75% of respondents preferred suburban-style housing layouts, and an analysis of multiple opinion studies reported that in aggregate 9 out of 14 surveys showed people favour houses over flats. By contrast, Create Streets cites research showing that living in tall apartment blocks tends to reduce wellbeing: a review of studies reported that 92% of 12 surveys found lower satisfaction in "big block" housing, along with higher rates of depression and social isolation. They also point to evidence that street-based neighbourhoods enhance social cohesion and reduce crime (e.g. better natural surveillance and sense of place). In sum, they claim, gentle density optimizes the trade-off between personal space (gardens, privacy) and proximity (community life, infrastructure), leading to higher wellbeing and often greater long-term property values.

The group publishes research reports to underpin its claims. Notable examples include Beyond Location (2017, Create Streets Ltd), which used "big data" analysis to show that urban quality factors – such as aesthetics, greenery and local character – can influence property values and resident satisfaction as much as traditional factors like access to jobs. Another output is No Place Left Behind (2020, Create Streets Foundation), a commissioned study exploring how community-led development can bolster local prosperity. Earlier publications include the Building Beautiful Commission's reports (Creating Space for Beauty, 2019 and Living with Beauty, 2020) to which the group contributed, as well as Create Streets' own reports on estate regeneration, street design and planning simplification. In each case the emphasis is on empirical evidence linking form (street layout, building height, design coding) to outcomes like wellbeing, crime rates and economic value.

== Policy impact and affiliations ==
Create Streets has sought to shape national planning policy. Nicholas Boys Smith served as co-chair (with Sir Roger Scruton) of the UK Government's Building Better, Building Beautiful Commission, an independent body set up in 2018. The Commission's final report Living with Beauty (published January 2020) drew heavily on Create Streets' ideas. The government accepted many of these recommendations: Boys Smith later noted that the National Planning Policy Framework was revised to make "beauty" an explicit aim, and that a new National Model Design Code was published as a direct outcome. In July 2023 the Ministry announced the Office for Place (an arm's-length advisory agency for design quality) to be based in Stoke-on-Trent, appointing Boys Smith as interim Chair. In his statement, Boys Smith affirmed that the Commission's proposals had gained near-universal support and praised their implementation in policy and training materials.

Beyond government bodies, Create Streets has engaged with municipal planning. For example, in responding to London's draft plan the organisation advocated introducing binding ballots for major estate redevelopments. Their submission argued that estate regeneration should not rely on token consultation, but on formal, neighbourhood forum–style ballots that follow a structured co-design process. Many of its suggestions have been echoed in national discourse: a 2024 Housing Today article highlighted Create Streets' campaign for 16 key actions (including design codes and transit expansion) as well as calls to transform "box-land" industrial/retail parks into mixed-use streets. The term "box-land" – large out-of-town single-use sites – was popularised in the article to describe areas that could be "reinvented" by adding housing and streets at gentle density. Create Streets' proposals have drawn interest from both Conservative and Labour circles, due to their data-driven approach to building design that aims to address the UK's housing supply and public consent challenges simultaneously.

== See also ==
- Nicholas Boys Smith
- New Urbanism
- New Classical architecture
- Urban design
- Design codes
- Placemaking
