= Aerial bomb =

Targeted aerial weapon

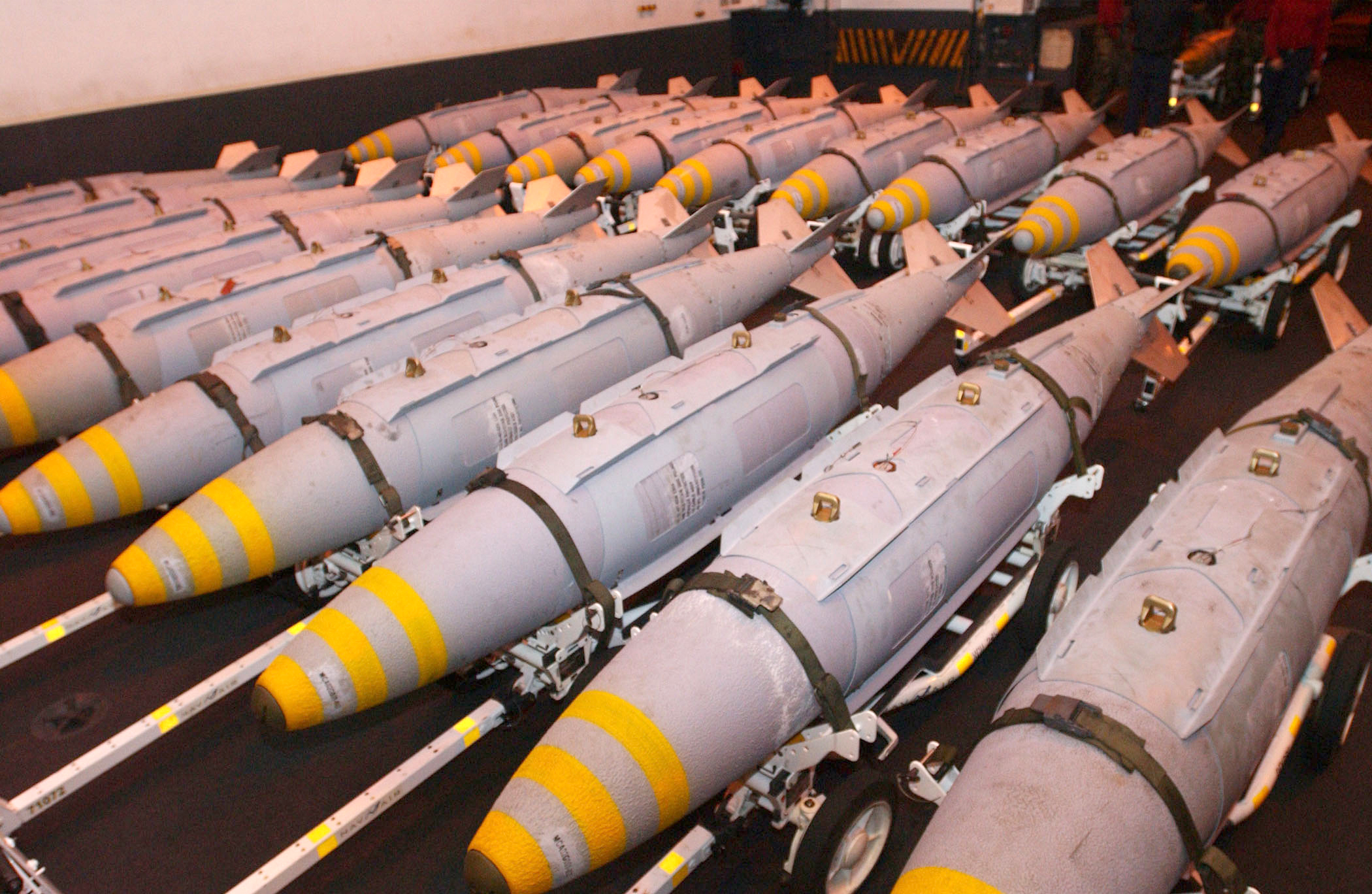
GBU-31 JDAM aerial bombs in the hangar bay of the USS Theodore Roosevelt (CVN-71)

An aerial bomb is a type of explosive (bomb) or incendiary weapon intended to be dropped from an aircraft and travel through the air on a predictable, unpowered trajectory. Aerial bombs can be further categorized into free-falling unguided bombs, water-skipping bouncing bombs, volplaning glide bombs, and precision-guided "smart bombs".

The use of aerial bombs against ground targets are known as aerial bombing, which can be either tactical (in the forms of airstrike and precision bombing) or strategic (in the forms of area/carpet bombing and firebombing).

== Bomb types ==
Aerial bombs include a vast range and complexity of designs. These include unguided gravity bombs, guided bombs, bombs hand-tossed from a vehicle, bombs needing a large specially-built delivery-vehicle, bombs integrated with the vehicle itself (such as a glide bomb), instant-detonation bombs, or delay-action bombs.

As with other types of explosive weapons, aerial bombs aim to kill and injure people or to destroy materiel through the projection of one or more of blast, fragmentation, radiation or fire outwards from the point of detonation.

== Early bombs ==
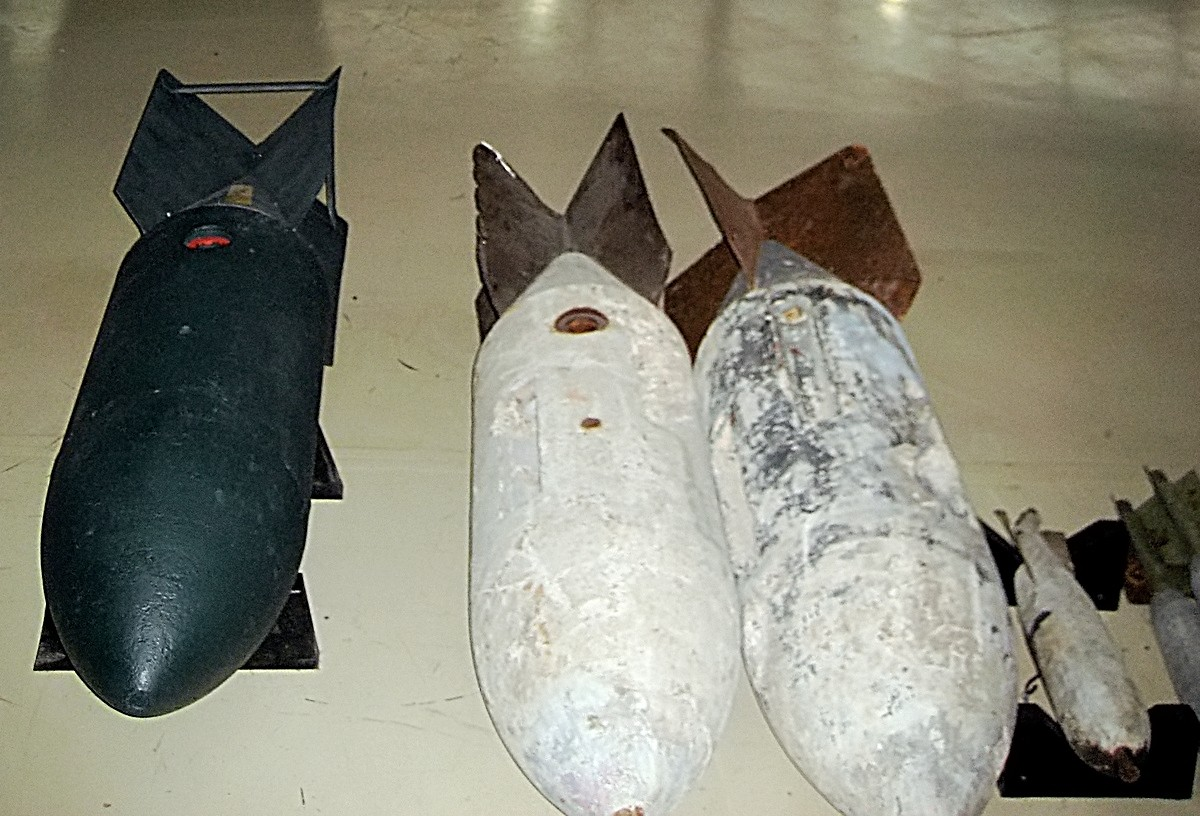
German aerial bombs from World War II. From left to right: explosive, 250 kg concrete practice bomb, 50 kg concrete practice bomb.

The first bombs delivered to their targets by air were single bombs carried on unmanned hot air balloons, launched by the Austrians against Venice in 1849 during the First Italian War of Independence.

The first bombs dropped from a heavier-than-air aircraft were grenades or grenade-like devices. Historically, the first use was by Giulio Gavotti on 1 November 1911, during the Italo-Turkish War.

In 1912, during the First Balkan War, Bulgarian Air Force pilot Hristo Toprakchiev suggested the use of aircraft to drop "bombs" (called grenades in the Bulgarian army at this time) on Turkish positions. Captain Simeon Petrov developed the idea and created several prototypes by adapting different types of grenades and increasing their payload.

On 16 October 1912, observer Prodan Tarakchiev dropped two of those bombs on the Turkish railway station of Karaağaç (near the besieged Edirne) from an Albatros F.2 aircraft piloted by Radul Milkov, for the first time in this campaign.

During the Mexican Revolution, US inventor Lester P. Barlow convinced General Pancho Villa of the insurgent Villista forces to purchase a plane from which bombs were dropped on trains carrying on Mexican Federal troops. Although the bombs were weak, they launched Barlow's career as an explosives inventor.

== World War Two ==
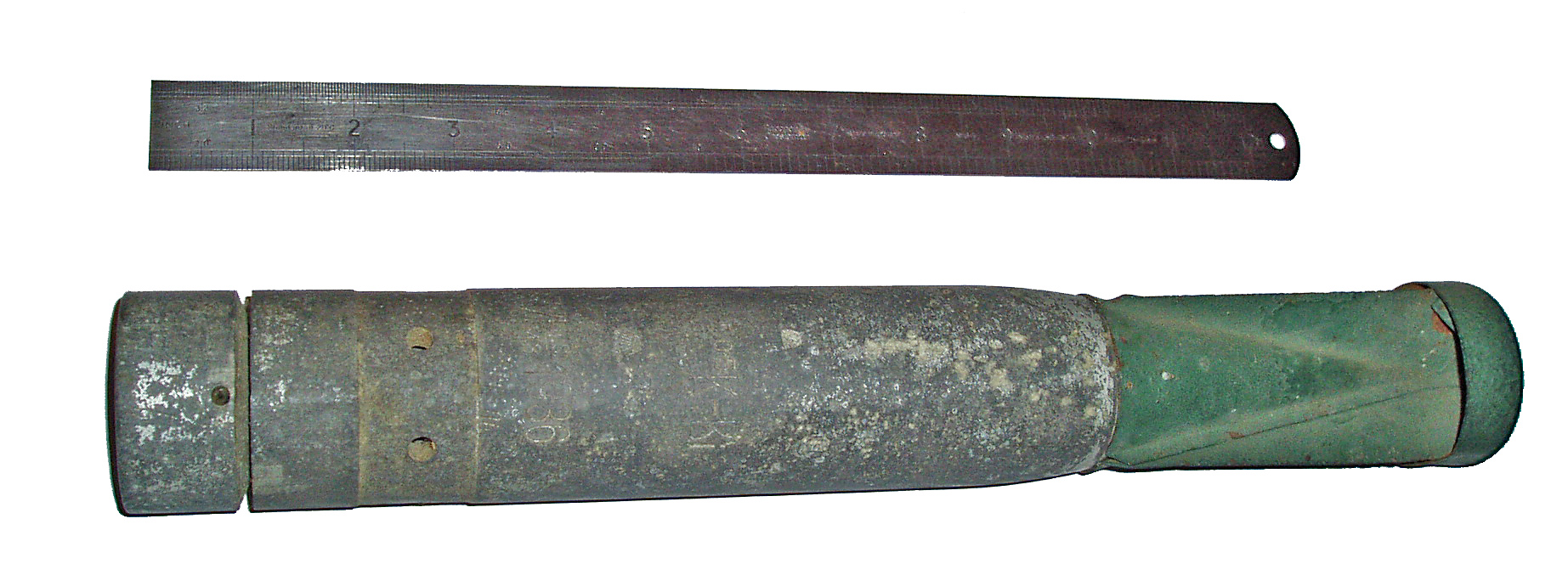
A Luftwaffe 1 kg incendiary bomb dated 1936

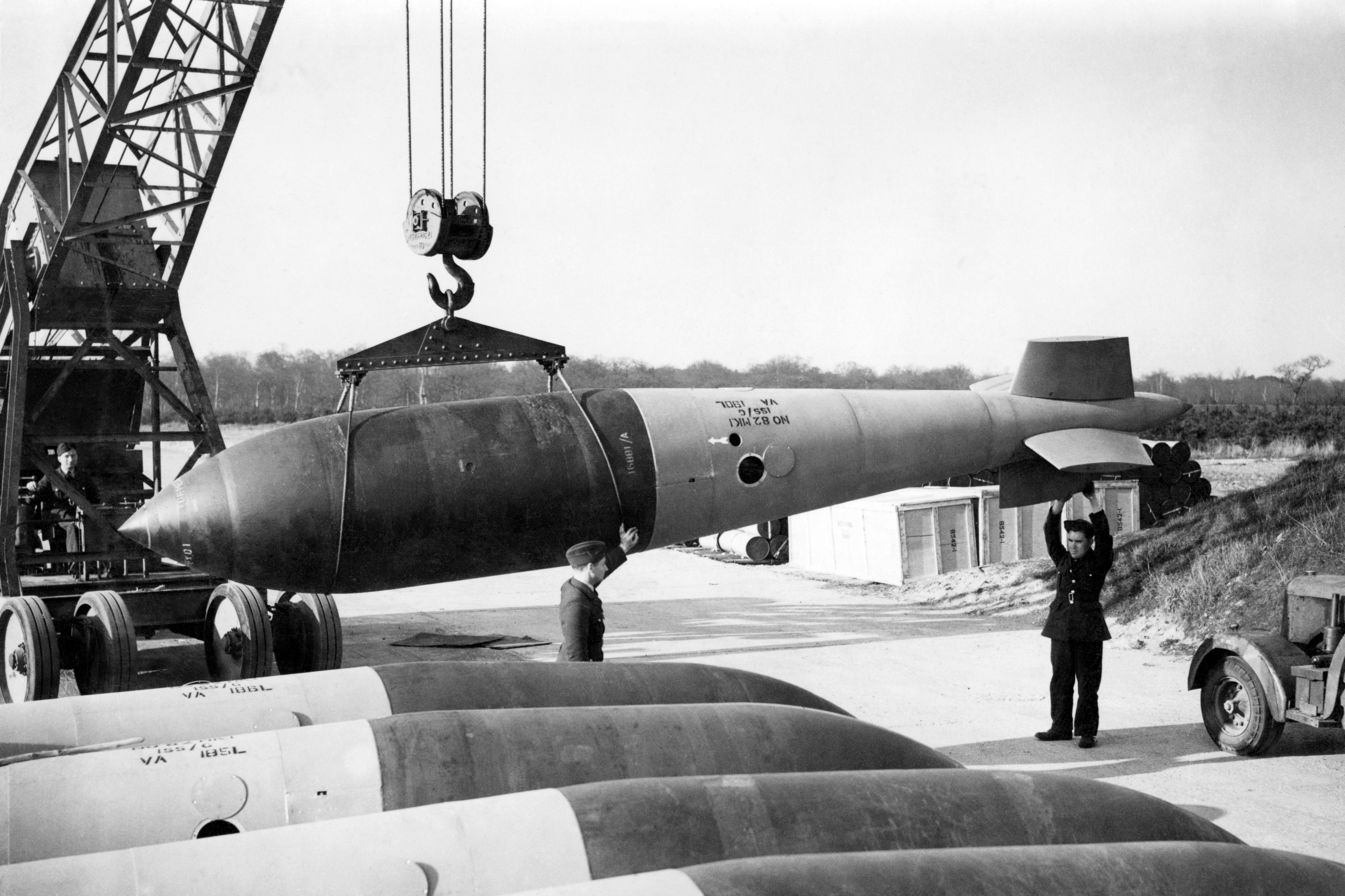
Royal Air Force "Grand Slam" earthquake bomb used towards the end of World War II

Aerial bombing saw widespread use during World War Two. A precursor was the 1937 bombing of Guernica by the Nazi German Luftwaffe and the Fascist Italian Aviazione Legionaria at the behest of Francisco Franco. The bombs used were a mix of high-explosive bombs and 1 kg (2.2 lb) incendiaries, that Germany would later use also against the UK.

As part of the Blitz, Nazi-Germany's Coventry Blitz set a benchmark for destruction that caused Joseph Goebbels to later use the term coventriert ("coventried") to describe similar levels of destruction of enemy cities.

While a single raid of the Coventry Blitz killed almost 600 people, later allied raids using conventional aerial bombs each killed up to tens of thousands of people, with the bombing of Dresden and the bombing of Hamburg as notable examples.

The final stages of World War Two saw the most lethal air raid in history, the bombing of Tokyo where possibly 100,000 or more were killed primarily by incendiary bombs. The majority of these incendiary bombs were the 500-pound (230 kg) E-46 cluster bomb which released 38 M-69 oil-based incendiary bombs at an altitude of 2,500 ft (760 m).

The end of World War Two was brought about with the aerial, atomic bombings of Hiroshima and Nagasaki that killed between 150,000 and 246,000 people and which remain the only use of nuclear weapons in an armed conflict.

== After World War Two ==
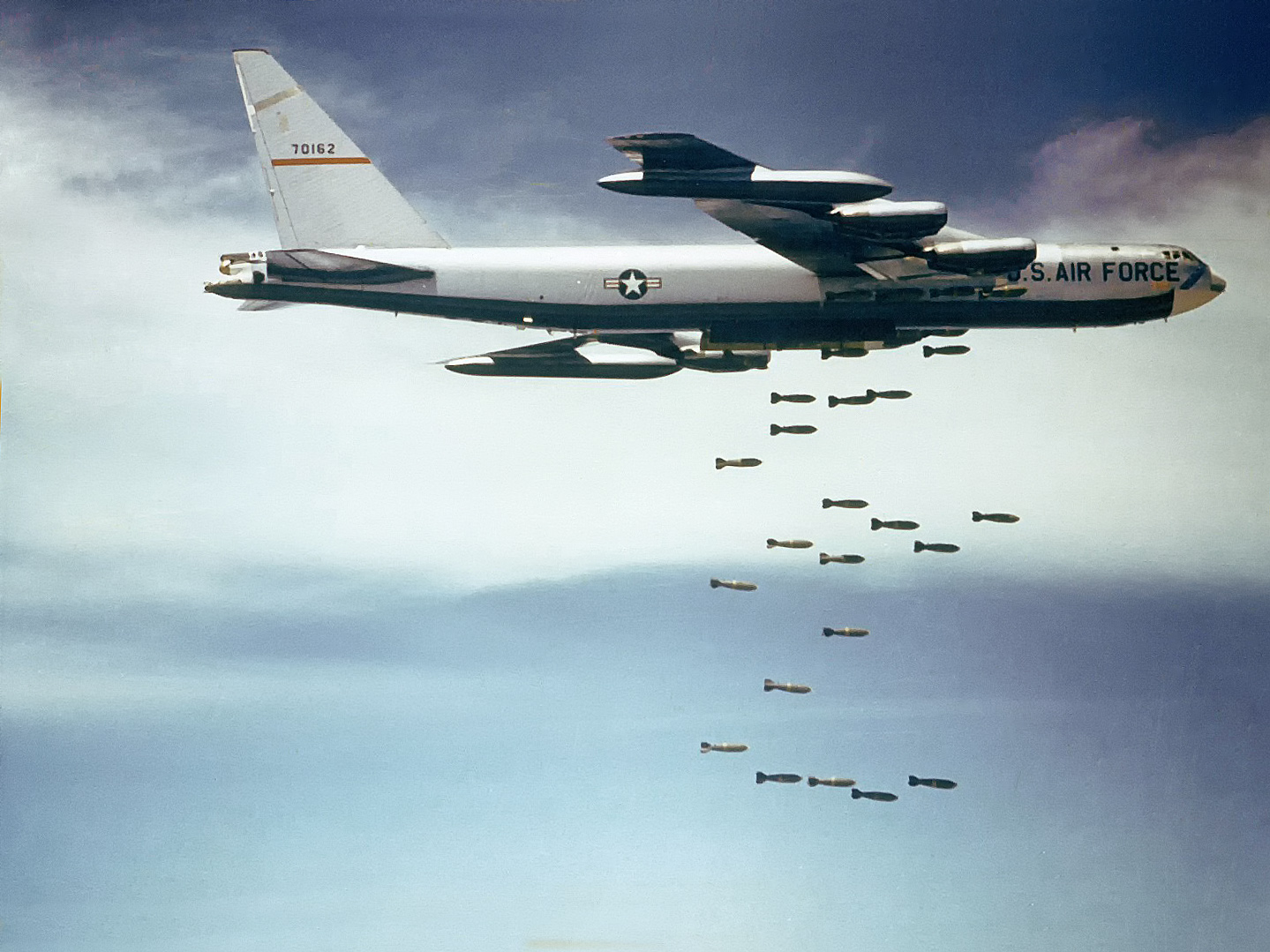
Aerial bombs dropped by a B-52 over Vietnam

An example of extensive use of aerial bombs after World War Two is the U.S. aerial bombing during the Vietnam War, where the amount of bombs dropped was more than three times what the USA dropped during World War II in Europe and Asia.

== Technical description ==
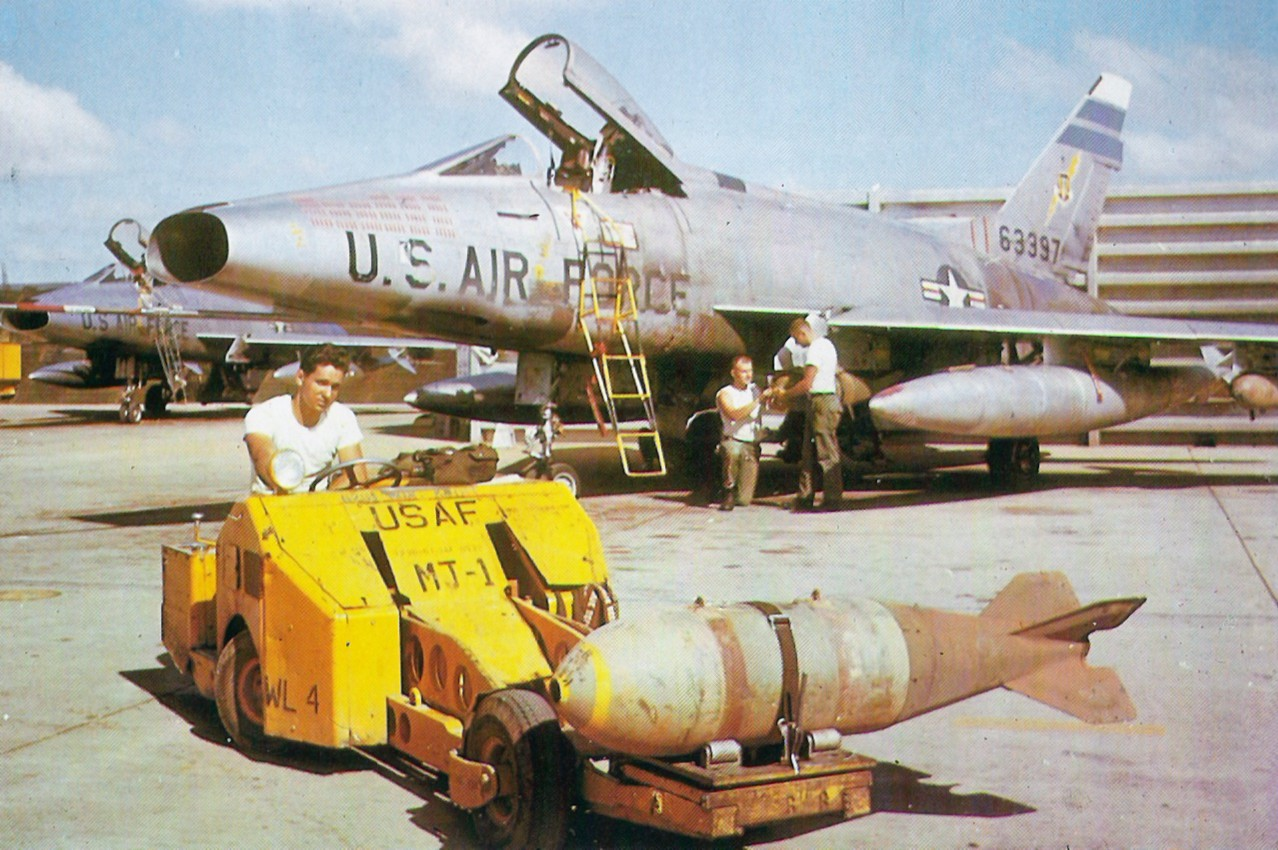
An F-100 Super Sabre being loaded with M117 bombs during the Vietnam War

Aerial bombs typically use a contact fuze to detonate the bomb upon impact, or a delayed-action fuze initiated by impact.

== Reliability ==
Controlled detonation of 250 kg World War Two aerial bomb in Schwabing, München in August 2012

Not all bombs dropped detonate; failures are common. It was estimated that during the Second World War about 10% of German bombs failed to detonate, and that Allied bombs had a failure rate of 15% or 20%, especially if they hit soft soil and used a pistol-type detonating mechanism rather than fuzes. A great many bombs were dropped during the war; thousands of unexploded bombs which may be able to detonate are discovered every year, particularly in Germany, and have to be defused or detonated in a controlled explosion, in some cases requiring evacuation of thousands of people beforehand, see World War II bomb disposal in Europe. Old bombs occasionally detonate when disturbed, or when a faulty time fuze eventually functions, showing that precautions are still essential when dealing with them.

== See also ==
- Aerial bombing of cities
- Area bombardment
- Bomber
- Explosive weapons
- Strategic bombing
- Tactical bombing

Types of aerial bomb

- Cluster bomb
- Concrete bomb
- Earthquake bomb
- Incendiary bomb
- General-purpose bomb
- Gravity (dumb) bomb
- Guided (smart) bomb
- Nuclear bomb
