= 2023 in England =

- Centuries: 19th; 20th; 21st
- Decades: 2000s; 2010s; 2020s
- See also: 2022–23 in English football 2023–24 in English football 2023 in the United Kingdom; Other events of 2023

Events of the year 2023 in England.

== Incumbent ==
- Monarch - Charles III
- Prime Minister - Rishi Sunak

== Events ==
=== January ===
- 1 January – A visit by Thor the Walrus to Scarborough harbour, North Yorkshire overnight on New Year's Eve results in the town's New Year fireworks celebrations being cancelled to let the walrus rest for his journey to the Arctic. He was previously spotted at Pagham Harbour, Calshot, Hampshire in December 2022.
- 2 January – Thor the Walrus makes an appearance in Blyth, Northumberland.
- 7 January – Prime Minister Rishi Sunak holds talks with health leaders in England to discuss pressures facing the National Health Service.
- 8 January – The government confirms plans to ban single-use items such as plastic cutlery, plates, and trays in England, with the ban subsequently announced to take effect from October.
- 13 January
  - Dennis McGrory, aged 75, is sentenced to life imprisonment for the 1975 murder of 15-year-old Jacqueline Montgomery following a trial at Huntingdon Crown Court. His conviction is the oldest murder case in England and Wales to involve the rule of double jeopardy.
  - Following a trial at Hove Crown Court, Mark Brown, 41, of St Leonards-on-Sea, East Sussex, is given two life sentences for the 2021 murders of Alexandra Morgan and Leah Ware.
- 14 January – Four women and two children are injured in a drive-by mass shooting close to a Catholic church in Euston Road, Euston, Central London. A 22-year-old man is arrested two days later on suspicion of attempted murder.
- 15 January – Train passengers using the South West Main Line are warned to expect major disruptions after a section of the track north of Hook railway station in Hampshire collapsed due to a landslide.
- 16 January – At London's Southwark Crown Court, former Metropolitan Police Parliamentary and Diplomatic Protection officer David Carrick admits over 40 offences including over 20 rapes.
- 23 January – Salisbury Crown Court in Wiltshire convicts Lawangeen Abdulrahimzai, an Afghan who committed a double murder in Serbia before moving to the UK as an asylum seeker, by pretending to be a 14-year-old refugee, of a murder he committed in Bournemouth, Dorset, in 2022.
- 25 January – Lawangeen Abdulrahimzai is sentenced to life imprisonment with a minimum of 29 years for the March 2022 murder of Thomas Roberts.

=== February ===
- 4 February – Police investigating the disappearance of Nicola Bulley, who went missing on 27 January while walking her dog, believe she may have fallen into the River Wyre at St Michael's on Wyre, Lancashire.
- 7 February – David Carrick, one of the UK's most prolific sex offenders, is sentenced at Southwark Crown Court to 36 life sentences with a minimum term of 30 years imprisonment.
- 10 February –
  - A large World War II bomb discovered in Great Yarmouth explodes as work is being carried out to defuse it, causing a blast that is heard for 15 miles.
  - During a demonstration in Knowsley, Merseyside, protesters clash with police outside a hotel that provides refuge for asylum seekers.
- 17 February –
  - The £2 cap on bus fares in England is extended for three months until 30 June amid concerns some routes could be lost if it were to end.
  - Buckinghamshire Council approves proposals for an £800m expansion of Pinewood Studios near Iver Heath.
- 19 February – Police searching for Nicola Bulley, missing since 27 January, say they have found a body in the River Wyre.
- 20 February –
  - Mayor of London Sadiq Khan announces the launch of a £130m scheme to give every primary school pupil in London free school meals during the 2023–24 academic year.
  - Junior doctors in England vote to strike in their ongoing dispute for a 26% pay rise, and will stage a 72-hour walkout. The British Medical Association maintaines junior doctors' pay has been cut by 26% since 2008 after inflation is considered.
  - Lancashire Police confirm the body found in the River Wyre the previous day is that of Nicola Bulley.
- 21 February –
  - A planned 48-hour strike by nurses is called off to allow the Royal College of Nursing and Department of Health and Social Care to enter into renewed negotiations. The BMA maintains that junior doctor's pay has been cut by 26% since 2008 after inflation is considered.
  - The UK Government recommends a 3.5% pay rise for public sector workers in England, below the rate of inflation.
- 22 February – Following a trial at Winchester Crown Court, Shaye Grove, 27, a woman obsessed with serial killers, is sentenced to life imprisonment with a minimum of 23 years for the murder of her boyfriend, who she stabbed to death in July 2022.
- 23 February – Figures produced by the Office for National Statistics show school absences in England remain above their pre-COVID levels, with 25.1% of pupils regularly absent during the autumn term of 2022 compared to 13.1% in autumn 2019.
- 24 February – The British Medical Association announces that junior doctors in England will begin a three-day strike on 13 March.

=== March ===
- 3 March –
  - The GMB and Unison unions have called off ambulance strikes in England scheduled for 6 and 8 March after the UK government agrees to reopen talks on pay for the 2022–23 and 2023–24 financial years.
  - Following a trial at Luton Crown Court, four people are jailed for their part in a robbery that went wrong during which their victim, Saul Murray, was stabbed after being given the drug GHB in an attempt to knock him out. Ikem Affia is sentenced to life imprisonment for murder, with a minimum of 25 years, while the three other gang members are given lesser sentences for manslaughter. The gang were caught after one of them was captured on CCTV wearing a rare Moncler coat worth £1,000, of which only 69 had been sold in the UK.
- 5 March – The Unite union calls off ambulance strikes scheduled for 6 and 8 March.
- 8 March – The National Institute for Health and Care Excellence (NICE) approves the use of the weight loss drug semaglutide (marketed as Wegovy) by the NHS in England.
- 13 March – The Unite union calls off a planned strike by bus drivers at National Express West Midlands scheduled for 16 March after receiving a revised pay offer, which is to be put to members.
- 16 March –
  - NHS staff in England, including nurses and ambulance staff, are offered a 5% pay rise from April along with a one-off payment of £1,655 to cover backdated pay. The offer does not include doctors, who are on a different contract.
  - Bus drivers at National Express West Midlands call a fresh strike for Monday 20 March after Unite claims National Express would not allow them to vote on the latest pay offer.
- 20 March – An indefinite strike by bus drivers at National Express West Midlands begins, affecting 93% of bus services in Birmingham. National Express operates a limited service to serve major hospitals in the area, and warns people not to travel by bus unless absolutely necessary.
- 23 March –
  - The British Medical Association announces that junior doctors in England will stage a four-day strike from 11 to 15 April in their continued quest for a 35% pay rise.
  - Harry Kane becomes the England national football team's all-time record scorer with 54 goals in 81 appearances, after scoring a penalty in a 1–2 win against Italy in UEFA Euro 2024 qualifying.
- 24 March – Andy Burnham, the Mayor of Greater Manchester, is fined £2,000 for speeding along a motorway at 78 mph in July 2022. He also receives three points on his driving licence.
- 25 March –
  - London City Hall bans its staff from using TikTok on all its official devices.
  - Bus drivers belonging to the Unite union vote to accept a 16.2% pay rise from National Express West Midlands, ending the week-long strike staged by bus drivers in the West Midlands.
- 26 March – A major incident is declared at Poole Harbour following a leak of 200 barrels of reservoir fluid, including oil, into the water.
- 27 March – The National Education Union urges teachers to vote against the latest government pay offer for England, raising the prospect of fresh strikes.
- 30 March – It is announced that COVID-19 testing in England is to be further scaled back from April. Staff and patients in hospitals will no longer be routinely swab tested for the virus, with staff only tested if they are in contact with immunocompromised patients.

=== April ===
- 2 April – The Birmingham Walkathon returns to the city for the first time since 2013. The event, originally organised by Birmingham radio station BRMB, is organised for its 2023 staging by former BRMB director David Bagley and charity Help Harry Help Others.
- 3 April –
  - NHS England launches its spring booster campaign, which will see around five million people, including those aged over 75 or classed as clinically vulnerable, receive a COVID-19 booster vaccine.
  - The National Education Union announces two further strike dates in England on 27 April and 2 May, stating that the offer from the pay UK government is unacceptable, not fully funded, and does not address a shortage of teachers.
  - Environment Minister Therese Coffey confirms government plans to ban wet wipes containing plastic in England as a means of helping to tackle water pollution.
  - The new England women's national football team kit is unveiled, and it is confirmed they will wear blue shorts at the 2023 World Cup. The change has been made amid period concerns.
- 4 April – Members of the Association of School and College Leaders overwhelmingly reject the UK government's 4.3% pay offer for teachers in England.
- 5 April –
  - Twenty one people are convicted over the largest child sex abuse case ever investigated by West Midlands Police.
  - The National Association of Head Teachers becomes the third teaching union to reject the UK government's 4.3% pay offer for teachers in England.
- 6 April –
  - The new England women's national football team home kit is worn for its inaugural match as England participates in the 2023 Women's Finalissima against Brazil.
  - At Wembley Stadium, England beat Brazil 4–2 in a penalty shootout to win their first Finalissima.
- 8 April – The NASUWT is to ballot its members on strike action after 87% of those who voted rejected the government's pay offer for teachers in England, which the union says fails to address concerns over pay and conditions.
- 11 April – Junior doctors in England begin a four-day strike.
- 14 April –
  - Two police officers are dismissed from the Metropolitan Police over offensive WhatsApp messages, some of them including offensive comments about model Katie Price's son, Harvey.
  - The Royal College of Nursing rejects a pay offer for nurses in England and announces a 48-hour strike from 8pm on 30 April to 8pm on 2 May.
  - UNISON confirms its members working for the NHS have voted unanimously to accept a 5% pay offer from the UK government.
  - Following a trial at Derby Crown Court, Stephen Boden and partner Shannon Marsden are convicted of the murder of their ten-month-old son Finley Boden on Christmas Day 2020, 39 days after he had been returned to them by social services.
- 15 April –
  - Merseyside Police say that 118 people have been arrested at Aintree Racecourse after protestors delay the start of the 2023 Grand National. The race, which is delayed by 14 minutes, is won by Corach Rambler, ridden by Derek Fox.
  - Shaun Slater, a Bromley councillor who tweeted that it was "more likely" a rape victim was a prostitute whose "punter... didn't pay", is expelled from the Conservative Party.
- 16 April – Around 600 Amazon workers based in Coventry and belonging to the GMB trade union begin a three-day strike over pay.
- 17 April – Prime Minister Rishi Sunak announces a review of the "core maths content" taught in England's schools, with the establishment of a panel to conduct the review.
- 24 April – The publishers of Big Issue North announce it is to cease publication in May, citing rising costs and reduced footfall in town centres.
- 25 April – South West Water implements a hosepipe ban for large parts of Devon in an attempt to replenish water levels at the Roadford Reservoir ahead of the summer.
- 26 April –
  - West Midlands Police launch a murder inquiry after a man is stabbed near Queensbridge School in Kings Heath. The next day 2 People are arrested.
  - The Royal College of Midwives announces that its members have voted to accept the government's pay offer for NHS workers in England.
- 28 April –
  - Members of the Unite union, mostly ambulance workers and junior healthcare staff, reject the UK government's 5% pay offer for NHS workers in England. The offer is rejected by around half of the 55% who voted.
  - The 5% NHS England pay offer is backed by the GMB union.
  - Four teaching unions in England – the National Education Union, NASUWT, National Association of Head Teachers and the Association of School and College Leaders – announce plans to co-ordinate strike action. At the time of the announcement only the National Education Union has the mandate to strike, but the other unions confirm they will ballot their members on whether to take strike action.
  - HMV announces plans to reopen its flagship store at 363 Oxford Street four years after it closed when the company went into administration.
- 29 April – A record crowd of 58,498 attend the final match of the 2023 Women's Six Nations Championship between England and France at Twickenham Stadium, at which England wins 38–33 to achieve the Grand Slam.
- 30 April – At 8pm, nurses in England begin a 28-hour walkout which will end at midnight on 1 May, the strike having been cut short from 48 hours after the High Court ruled strike action beyond then would be unlawful because it falls outside the six-month period since the ballot in which nurses voted to strike was closed.

=== May ===
- 2 May – The 5% pay increase for one million NHS staff in England is signed off at a meeting between the UK government and representatives from 14 trade unions; all NHS employees but doctors and dentists are represented at the meeting.
- 5 May – Following her trial and conviction at Norwich Crown Court, Helen Hewlett is sentenced to seven and a half years in prison after attempting to hire a hitman to kill a colleague with whom she had a brief affair.
- 8 May – Data published by NHS Business Services Authority indicated the number of community pharmacies in England is at its lowest since 2015, with 1,025 pharmacies in operation, and 160 having closed in the past two years.
- 9 May – Several areas of England are hit by flash floods as much of the country is affected by heavy rain storms.
- 10 May –
  - A major incident is declared in Somerset following heavy rain and flash flooding in southern England.
  - The Metropolitan Police apologises for failing to disclose documents relating to the Murder of Daniel Morgan that were found in a locked cabinet at its headquarters.
- 12 May – David Boyd, 55, is found guilty at Newcastle Law Courts of the 1992 murder of Nikki Allan in Sunderland, Tyne and Wear. The jury of 10 women and two men spent two and a half hours of deliberating to convict Boyd of the murder. Boyd is due to be sentenced on 23 May 2023.
- 14 May – Chelsea defeat Manchester United 1–0 to win the 2023 Women's FA Cup final.
- 16 May – Greggs reaches a deal with Westminster City Council to allow it to sell food and hot drinks at its Leicester Square outlet until 2.00am on some nights. The council had objected to a previous plan for 24-hour opening amid concerns it would attract antisocial behaviour, with the agreement reached as a court case was about to commence.
- 17 May – The £2 cap on bus fares in England is extended until the end of October; a £2.50 cap will then be in place until December 2024.
- 18 May – Two teenage cousins are sentenced to life imprisonment for the murder of Khayri Mclean, who was stabbed in Huddersfield, West Yorkshire in 2022 as he walked home from school.
- 22 May – After the latest round of talks with the government end without resolution, the British Medical Association announces that junior doctors will stage another 72-hour strike, scheduled to begin on 14 June.
- 23 May –
  - Samantha Lee, a former Metropolitan Police constable who failed to properly investigate two counts of indecent exposure committed by Wayne Couzens, is found guilty of gross misconduct following a hearing.
  - David Boyd is sentenced to life imprisonment with a minimum term of 29 years for the 1992 murder of Nikki Allan.
- 25 May – The UK Health Security Agency urges people at risk of contracting the Mpox virus to get vaccinated after 10 new cases were discovered in London between 30 April and 25 May.
- 26 May –
  - Following a trial at Derby Crown Court, Stephen Boden and Shannon Marsden, who killed their ten-month-old son, Finley Boden, on Christmas Day 2020, 39 days after he was returned to them by social services, are sentenced to life imprisonment with minimum terms of 29 years and 27 years respectively.
  - Following a trial at the Old Bailey, Jake Drummond is sentenced to life imprisonment with a minimum of 32 years for the murder of 15-month-old Jacob Lennon. Drummond's partner, and Jacob's mother, Louise Lennon, is sentenced to 10 years for causing or allowing her son's death.
  - Presenter Phillip Schofield admits to the Daily Mail that he had an affair with a "much younger man" who worked as a runner on This Morning, subsequently apologising and resigning from ITV.
- 27 May – The 2023 Premiership Rugby final is disrupted when protestors from Just Stop Oil run onto the pitch at Twickenham Stadium and throw orange powder paint. Two men are subsequently charged in connection with the incident.
- 29 May – The Metropolitan Police Service confirms it will stop attending emergency calls relating to mental health from September in order to free up officers' time.
- 31 May – 2023 Bournemouth beach incident, Two people die and eight others are injured during an incident at a beach in Bournemouth.

=== June ===
- 7 June –
  - The UK Health Security Agency issues a heat health alert for parts of England during the upcoming weekend, when temperatures are expected to reach 30 °C.
  - Woking Borough Council imposes emergency spending restrictions on itself because of a £2bn debt.
- 8 June –
  - The UK Health Security Agency upgrades the heat health warning for the upcoming warm weather to an amber alert.
  - Henderson Hall in Newcastle is destroyed by a large fire.
- 9 June –
  - The Independent Office for Police Conduct (IOPC) launches an investigation into the death of a 15-year-old boy whose e-scooter crashed into an ambulance in Salford the previous day, and shortly after he was followed by officers from Greater Manchester Police.
  - Three people, including two students, are described as being in hospital following an assault at the privately run Blundell's School in Tiverton, Devon. A local teenager has been arrested.
- 10 June – A 16-year-old youth is charged with two counts of attempted murder and one of grievous bodily harm following the previous day's incident at Blundell's School.
- 11 June – Eight teenagers – six boys and two girls – are arrested following the fatal stabbing of a 16-year-old male youth at a house party in Bath, Somerset the previous evening.
- 13 June – Three people are killed in attacks across Nottingham City Centre.
- 21 June – A man is arrested after two people are stabbed at London's Central Middlesex Hospital. He is subsequently charged over the incident.
- 23 June – Junior doctors in England announce a five-day strike from 7am on 13 July, their longest so far.
- 24 June – David Hinton, the chief executive of South East Water, has blamed the increase in people working from home as a result of the COVID-19 pandemic for the implementation of a planned hosepipe ban on 26 June, with an estimated 20% increase in the use of drinking water in commuter towns.
- 25 June – Avon and Somerset Police confirm that a man in his 40s has died following a "medical incident" at the 2023 Glastonbury Festival.
- 26 June – An inquest opens into the death of Nicola Bulley.
- 27 June –
  - The inquest into the death of Nicola Bulley returns a verdict of accidental death.
  - Sarah Bentley resigns as chief executive of Thames Water after previously forgoing her bonus after raw sewage became a problem for the company.
  - Nurses in England will not continue their strike action after a Royal College of Nursing ballot failed to garner enough votes to achieve a mandate. The majority of the 43% who voted favoured continued strike action, but this was below the 50% turnout required under trade union regulations.
  - Senior consultants in England will begin strike action after 86% of those who took part in a ballot voted to take strike action; a previously announced 48-hour strike will now go ahead from 21 July.
- 28 June –
  - The second Test match of the 2023 Ashes series is briefly interrupted when Just Stop Oil protestors invade the pitch at Lord's.
  - Thames Water is reported to be in talks with the UK government to secure extra funding amid concerns the company is on the brink of collapse.
- 29 June – Sir John Mitting's interim report for the Undercover Policing Inquiry is published. The report concludes that the tactics of the Special Demonstration Squad were not justified, and that most groups infiltrated by its members posed no threat to national security. The report also finds that the SDS should have been disbanded early on.
- 30 June – Charlotte Dewar, chief executive of the Independent Press Standards Organisation, says the watchdog is considering the media coverage surrounding the death of Nicola Bulley, but has no current plans to launch an investigation.

=== July ===
- 1 July –
  - Local Government Minister Lee Rowley formally writes to South Cambridgeshire District Council to request they end their trial of a four-day working week "immediately" amid concerns about "value for money". The scheme, launched in January 2023, is scheduled to run until March 2024.
  - Seven Just Stop Oil protestors are arrested after attempting to disrupt the 2023 London Pride celebrations by blocking the route of the parade. Five people are subsequently charged in connection with the incident.
- 2 July – Amanda Pritchard, the Chief Executive of NHS England, announces the launch of a further seven specialist gambling addiction clinics in England as the number of people being referred for help because of gambling addiction sees a sharp increase.
- 3 July –
  - Lord Chancellor and Justice Secretary Alex Chalk asks the Parole Board to reconsider its decision to release child killer Colin Pitchfork.
  - Ranibizumab, a drug that can prevent blindness in premature babies, is made available on the NHS in England.
- 4 July –
  - Thames Water is fined £3.3m for discharging millions of litres of untreated sewage into two rivers which resulted in the death of 1,400 fish.
  - Forest Green Rovers appoint Hannah Dingley as their caretaker manager, making her the first woman to manage a men's football team in English professional football.
- 5 July –
  - Train companies in England launch a 21-day consultation over plans to closing hundreds of ticket offices.
  - Two Just Stop Oil protestors briefly halt play at the 2023 Wimbledon Championships by invading the tennis court and throwing orange confetti.
- 6 July –
  - One child dies, while 16 are injured after a Land Rover hits a primary school in Wimbledon, south-west London. The crash is not treated as terror-related, but the driver is arrested on suspicion of causing death by dangerous driving.
  - The UK Health Security Agency and Met Office issue a yellow heat health alert for six regions of England, effective from 12pm on 7 July to 9am on 9 July, when temperatures are expected to reach 28 °C–30 °C in some areas.
  - RMT workers on the London Underground announce six days of strikes from Sunday 23 July to Friday 28 July.
- 7 July – British cinema chain Empire Cinemas collapses into administration with the immediate loss of 150 jobs, citing the impact of the COVID-19 pandemic and the ongoing cost-of-living crisis as the main reasons. The closures leave Sunderland and Wigan with no main cinema.
- 8 July – The Union Chain Bridge, which spans the River Tweed, linking England and Scotland, is named as an International Historic Civil Engineering Landmark.
- 9 July – A second child dies of injuries sustained in the crash at a school in Wimbledon, south London.
- 10 July – A teenage boy is arrested on suspicion of attempted murder after a teacher is stabbed at Tewkesbury School in Gloucestershire. The school, along with neighbouring schools, are locked down during the incident. The teacher is hospitalised. He is charged with attempted wounding with intent and possession of bladed article the next day.
- 12 July – Members of the NASUWT teaching union in England vote to stage strike action over pay, with 85.5% of members voting to do so on a 51.9% turnout.
- 13 July –
  - Data released by NHS England indicates that 7.47 million people were waiting to begin routing hospital treatment in June 2023, an increase from 7.42 million in May.
  - The UK government proposes a 6.5% pay rise for teachers, with the leaders of all four major teaching unions expressing support for the increase, meaning strikes by teachers in England are likely to end.
  - Pradjeet Veadhasa, 17, and Sukhman Shergill, 17, are sentenced to life imprisonment with minimum terms of 18 and 16 years respectively for the June 2022 murder of 16-year-old Ronan Kanda in Wolverhampton, who they stabbed after mistaking him for an enemy.
- 14 July –
  - The UK Health Security Agency warns that tens of thousands of cases of measles could potentially occur in London because of low vaccination numbers there.
  - A 65-year-old man is charged with the murders of Naomi Hunte, who was stabbed to death in February 2022, and Fiona Holm, who disappeared in June 2023 and whose body has not been found.
  - The UK government approves plans to build a road tunnel near Stonehenge.
  - Following trial and conviction at Portsmouth Crown Court, Sarah Somerton-How and her lover, George Webb, are both sentenced to 11 years imprisonment for wilful neglect and holding a person in slavery or servitude after they kept Somerton-How's husband, who has cerebral palsy and is severely sight impaired, a prisoner in squalid conditions for four years. it is believed to be the first prosecution of its kind.
  - Dorset Police announce that no criminal offences were committed in relation to the 2023 Bournemouth beach incident in which two people were killed.
- 17 July – NHS consultants in England announce a further two days of strike action, on 24 and 25 August.
- 20 July – Parliamentary by-elections take place in Somerton and Frome, Uxbridge and South Ruislip, and Selby and Ainsty.
- 21 July –
- 21 July –
  - July 2023 by-elections:
    - Uxbridge and South Ruislip: The former seat of ex-PM Boris Johnson is held by the Conservatives, but with a reduced majority of 495 votes. Steve Tuckwell becomes the constituency's MP. The proposed ULEZ expansion by Labour's Sadiq Khan, Mayor of London, is a factor in the result.
    - Selby and Ainsty: Labour takes the formerly safe Conservative seat of Selby and Ainsty. The swing of 23.7% is the largest since 1945. Keir Mather becomes the constituency's new MP, and at 25, the youngest Member of Parliament and Baby of the House.
    - Somerton and Frome: The Liberal Democrats take Somerton and Frome, overturning a Conservative majority of 29.6%. Sarah Dyke is elected as the constituency's new MP.
  - Planned strikes on the London Underground from 23 to 28 July are called off following last minute talks between union representatives and Transport for London.
  - The Association of School and College Leaders, which represents headteachers in England, votes to accept 6.5% pay rise.
  - Following trial and conviction at Wood Green Crown Court, Patrick Simms is sentenced to nine years in prison for the rape of a 15-year-old girl he committed after meeting the girl at a leisure centre in Hackney in 1987.
- 22 July – Seb Dance, the Deputy Mayor of London, confirms that day travelcards will be phased out for travel within London.
- 23 July – Newcastle's Northern Pride is forced to end early after heavy rain makes the festival site unsafe.
- 24 July – The Metropolitan Police announce that radical preacher Anjem Choudary has been charged with three terror offences.
- 25 July –
  - Data published by the Department for Levelling Up, Housing and Communities indicates the number of homeless people to be at a 25-year high, with 105,000 households in England living in temporary accommodation, a figure that includes 131,000 children.
  - Data released by the Metropolitan Police indicates that a 13-week campaign by Just Stop Oil has cost the force £7.7m to police.
- 26 July – The Court of Appeal overturns the 2004 conviction of Andrew Malkinson, convicted of a 2003 rape in Salford on unreliable evidence.
- 27 July – The UK government confirms that COVID-19-era licencing rules in England allowing pubs to sell takeaway drinks will end on 30 September.
- 28 July – The High Court rules that the planned extension of London's Ultra Low Emission Zone is lawful after rejecting a legal challenge from five Conservative-led local authorities.
- 29 July – Prime Minister Rishi Sunak urges Mayor of London Sadiq Kahn to reconsider his plans to expand the Ultra Low Emission Zone, describing it as an "unnecessary extra tax".
- 30 July – Grime artist Stormzy and HSBC announce an extension of the Stormzy Scholarships scheme, with funding for a further 36 places for black students at Cambridge University. Each student will receive a £20,000 annual scholarship.
- 31 July –
  - The National Education Union says that its members have voted to accept the UK government's 6.5% pay offer for teachers in England, with 86% of those voting in favour of the increase.
  - Wild camping is to be allowed on Dartmoor once again after the National Park Authority wins a legal challenge against its suspension.

=== August ===
- 1 August – A BBC News investigation discovers that people earning more than £30,000 are being told they are not eligible to rent affordable housing in London because they do not earn enough money.
- 3 August – Rashid Gedel, 22, and Shiroh Ambersley, 22, are sentenced to life imprisonment with a minimum term of 27 years for the February 2021 murder of Sven Badzak in North West London, who was stabbed in a case of mistaken identity. Gedel would later allegedly murder convicted pedophile and former Lostprophets frontman Ian Watkins in prison in October 2025.
- 4 August –
  - The UK government announces plans to tackle the NHS backlog with the opening of 13 new regional diagnostic centres, eight of which will be privately run. The government also wants to make it easier for the NHS to access services from the private sector.
  - Following a trial at Derby Crown Court, Craig Crouch is sentenced to life imprisonment with a minimum term of 28 years for the murder of his 10-month-old stepson, Jacob Crouch, in December 2020. Jacob's mother, Gemma Barton, is sentenced to 10 years imprisonment for causing or allowing the death of a child.
  - The scrappage scheme for non-compliant vehicles is extended to the whole of London ahead of the expansion of the Ultra Low Emission Zone.
  - Following a trial at Leicester Crown Court, TikTok social influencer Mahek Bukhari and her mother Ansreen Bukhari, are found guilty of murdering two men whose car was rammed off the road following a dispute over an affair Mrs Bukhari had been having with one of the men.
- 5 August – The 18th century Crooked House, once known as "Britain's wonkiest pub", is gutted by a fire. The pub is demolished two days later. Police subsequently confirm they are treating the fire as arson.
- 6 August – The Mirror reports that former Lostprophets singer Ian Watkins, who is serving a 29-year sentence for child sex offences, was stabbed during an attack at Wakefield Prison the previous day.
- 7 August –
  - Data published by Halifax Bank indicates house prices have fallen by their fastest rate in South East England over the past year, with a 3.9% fall, an average of around £15,500.
  - Consultants in England belonging to the British Medical Association announce a two-day strike on 19 and 20 September.
- 9 August – Nine arrests are made in London's Oxford Street and 34 dispersal orders issued after youths descend on the area prompted by online videos urging them to turn up and cause disruption.
- 10 August –
  - NHS hospital waiting lists in England reached 7.5 million at the end of June 2023, up around 100,000 from the previous month, and three times higher than they were at the start of the COVID-19 pandemic.
  - A murder investigation is launched following the discovery of a 10-year-old girl's body at an address in Woking, Surrey. The girl is subsequently named as Sara Sharif, while an international manhunt is launched after it emerges that three people known to her bought one way tickets to Pakistan and left the UK before her body was discovered.
  - High street retail chain Wilko collapses into administration after last-minute rescue talks failed to secure new funding, putting 12,000 jobs at risk of potential redundancy.
- 11 August –
  - At 7am, junior doctors in England begin another four day strike, their fifth walkout.
  - "Human error" is blamed after the names and salaries of every employee of Cumbria Police, including police officers, was accidentally uploaded to its website on 6 March.
  - A UK Health Security Agency investigation into a number of cases of sickness and diarrhoea at the 2023 WOMAD Festival is inconclusive on a cause.
- 13 August –
  - The UK government decides to retain COVID-19 licencing rules for pubs in England and Wales that allows the sale of takeaway drinks.
  - Two men are taken to hospital after being stabbed in what is described as a homophobic attack outside a club in Clapham, South London.
- 14 August – NHS England announces plans to cut the number of cancer waiting list targets, which it describes as outdated.
- 15 August –
  - The UK government confirms that train fares will rise below the rate of inflation in 2024, and the increase will again be delayed until March as in 2023.
  - Six former Metropolitan Police officers have been charged with sending racist messages on WhatsApp following a BBC Newsnight investigation.
  - Kirklees Council in West Yorkshire votes to restrict all but non-essential spending as it faces financial difficulties.
- 16 August –
  - Documents relating to the Andrew Malkinson case show that another man's DNA was identified by investigators in 2007, raising questions as to why he was not granted a review by the Criminal Cases Review Commission much Allier than occurred.
  - A member of staff at the British Museum has been dismissed and a police investigation launched over "missing, stolen or damaged" artefacts.
  - 2023 FIFA Women's World Cup: England secure a place in their first World Cup Final after beating Australia 3–1.
- 20 August – 2023 FIFA Women's World Cup Final: England are defeated 1–0 by Spain.
- 22 August –
  - Following trial and conviction at Wood Green Crown Court, former Metropolitan Police officer Adam Provan is sentenced to 16 years in prison for the rape of a fellow police officer and a teenage girl. He is also required to serve a further eight years on extended licence.
  - Raymond Parry, a former Transport for London worker awarded an MBE as recognition for his heroism during the 7 July London bombings, has been stripped of the honour after he admitted sexually abusing a child.
- 24 August –
  - Justice Secretary Alex Chalk announced the launch of a non-statutory inquiry to investigate the wrongful conviction of Andrew Malkinson, which will examine the role of the Crown Prosecution Service, Greater Manchester Police and the Criminal Cases Review Commission over their handling of the case.
  - A court in Pakistan rules that police cannot detain relatives of the father of Sara Sharif, found dead at her family home in Woking on 10 August, in an attempt to locate him.
  - Nike, Inc announces it will sell "limited quantities" of a replica goalkeeper shirt worn by England goalkeeper Mary Earps during the 2023 Women's World Cup after around 150,000 people signed an online petition calling for them to be made available.
  - A police officer is taken to hospital with critical injuries after being hit by a train while trying to help a distressed man on the railway track in Nottinghamshire.
- 25 August – Hartwig Fischer announces he will step down as director of the British Museum after treasures were stolen from the London institution.
- 26 August – Two people are killed after driving a car into a flooded road in the Mossley Hill area of Liverpool.
- 27 August – The Metropolitan Police launch an investigation into a possible data breach involving details about thousands of their officers after "unauthorised access" was gained to the system of one of its suppliers.
- 29 August –
  - Nottinghamshire Police officer Sgt Graham Saville, 46, who was struck by a train while trying to help a distressed man on the railway track, dies in hospital from injuries sustained in the incident.
  - London's Ultra Low Emission Zone is expanded to include the whole of Greater London.
- 30 August – England's Autumn 2023 flu vaccination and COVID-19 booster programme is brought forward by a month, from October to September, as scientists from the UK Health Security Agency monitor the BA.2.86 variant. Although it is not a variant of concern, it is being monitored due to its high number of mutations.
- 31 August –
  - More than 100 schools in England are told to close buildings while work is carried out on concrete prone to collapse. Thousands of pupils will face being taught via remote learning or in temporary classrooms while the work is completed.
  - After junior doctors in England vote to continue strike action, the British Medical Association announces that junior doctors and consultants will stage co-ordinated strikes going forward.
  - Police in Pakistan say they did not receive an Interpol request to search for the family of Sara Sharif until 15 August, five days after her body was found at a house in Woking, Surrey.

=== September ===
- 1 September –
  - Schools Minister Nick Gibb confirms that buildings at 52 schools were in immediate danger of collapse due to concrete, while 100 others have been told to close affected areas until they can have them made safe.
  - TikTok influencer Mahek Bukhari and her mother, Ansreen Bukhari, are both sentenced to life imprisonment for the murders of Saqib Hussain and Hashim Ijazuddin. Mahek Bukhari is ordered to serve a minimum of 31 years and eight months in custody, while Ansreen Bukhari is ordered to serve at least 26 years and nine months.
- 3 September –
  - Chancellor Jeremy Hunt says the UK government will "spend what it takes" to put right defective concrete in schools, but concedes that structural problems could be identified in more schools and other public buildings.
  - Data released by the UK government indicates one in five children of school age in England are regularly missing school.
- 4 September – The UK government orders an urgent investigation into court buildings built in the 1990s to determine whether they contain reinforced autoclaved aerated concrete.
- 5 September – Birmingham City Council, the largest local authority in Europe, declares itself effectively bankrupt. The crisis, which prevents all but essential spending to protect core services, is linked to a £760m bill to settle equal pay claims, along with implementation of a new IT system.
- 7 September – A 10-year-old boy dies in hospital after he was electrocuted at a Blackpool hotel a few days earlier.
- 9 September – Police in the Pakistani city of Jhelum say they have detained ten relatives of Urfan Sharif, the father of Sara Sharif, for questioning.
- 10 September – Nine vehicles are damaged when a privately owned military truck is driven through a police roadblock at Norton Fitzwarren, near Taunton, Somerset. A man is subsequently charged over the incident.
- 11 September –
  - England's Autumn 2023 flu vaccination and COVID-19 booster programme begins, having been brought forward from October due to the BA.2.86 variant.
  - The grandfather of Sara Sharif tells BBC News that five children who travelled to Pakistan with the dead girl's father have been taken by police. A judge subsequently rules that the children should be sent to a government childcare facility.
  - Transport for London bans an advert for an artisan cheese after the product is deemed to be too unhealthy.
- 12 September – An inquest into the death of Melissa Kerr, a 31-year-old woman from Gorleston, Norfolk, who died after undergoing buttocks enlargement surgery at a private clinic in Turkey in 2019, concludes she was not given enough information concerning the risks.
- 13 September –
  - Three adults who police want to speak to about the death of Sara Sharif return to the UK from Pakistan, and are arrested on suspicion of murder.
  - The Independent Office for Police Conduct is to investigate Greater Manchester Police over its handling of the wrongful conviction of Andrew Malkinson.
  - A power supply issue at Thames Water's west London treatment works leaves thousands of properties in south west London without water or with low water pressure.
- 14 September –
  - Health Secretary Steve Barclay gives his backing to the introduction of Martha's Rule to hospitals in England, where patients are made aware that they are entitled to a second opinion. NHS England will also begin implementing the rule.
  - The Metropolitan Police have paid damages to two women who were arrested at a vigil for Sarah Everard, who was murdered by a serving police officer in March 2021.
- 15 September –
  - Three people appear in court charged with the murder of Sara Sharif, and are remanded in custody.
  - The Metropolitan Police apologises and agrees to pay compensation to Alfie Meadows, who sustained brain injuries after being hit with a baton by a police officer during the 2010 student protests.
- 16 September – A man is arrested in the Royal Mews near Buckingham Palace following reports of someone climbing a wall in the area; he is detained under the Serious Organised Crime and Police Act on suspicion of trespassing.
- 17 September – Heavy rain causes flash flooding in Kenton, Devon.
- 19 September – The UK government announces that commissioners will be appointed to oversee the running of Birmingham City Council following its recent financial troubles.
- 21 September – During a hearing at the Old Bailey, Daniel Khalife pleads not guilty to escaping from Wandsworth Prison.
- 22 September – Surrey Police release new pictures of Sara Sharif as they appeal for more information about her.
- 23 September –
  - Media outlets, including BBC News, report that a number of firearms officers have stepped back from their role within the Metropolitan Police after a colleague was charged with murder over the shooting of Chris Kaba.
  - Former prime minister Boris Johnson warns present prime minister Rishi Sunak against building what he describes as a "mutilated" version of HS2 following reports that the northern leg of the route from Birmingham to Manchester could be scrapped amid concerns over spiralling costs.
- 24 September –
  - The Ministry of Defence is offering the Metropolitan Police armed soldiers to support its officers after several firearms officers handed in their weapons.
  - Greater Manchester becomes the first area of England to reverse bus deregulation with the launch of its Bee Network, whereby bus services are franchised by the local authority to bus companies.
- 25 September –
  - NHS England announces that more than one million appointments and treatments have been lost due to strike action by NHS staff.
  - Mayor of Greater Manchester Andy Burnham says that scrapping the HS2 rail link between Birmingham and Manchester risks "ripping the heart" out of plans to improve rail services across northern England.
- 27 September –
  - Comer Homes Group is ordered to demolish two tower blocks it built as part of the Mast Quay Phase II complex after Greenwich Borough Council planners determined the blocks differed significantly from the original plans that were submitted and approved in 2012.
- 28 September – A 16-year-old boy is arrested in connection with the felling of the Sycamore Gap Tree at Hadrian's Wall, which was cut down overnight.
- 29 September –
  - A 15-year-old girl and a bus driver are killed, and several children taken to hospital, after a school bus overturns on the M53 motorway at Wirral, Merseyside.
  - A 17-year-old boy appears in court charged with the murder of Elianne Andam, and is remanded in youth detention to appear before the Old Bailey on 3 October.
- 30 September – Go North East bus drivers begin strike action after last-minute talks over pay between the bus operator and Unite ended without a resolution.

=== October ===
- 1 October – A ban on single-use plastic cutlery, plates and polystyrene trays comes into force in England.
- 2 October –
  - NHS doctors in England begin a 72-hour strike as their dispute over pay and conditions continues.
  - Education Secretary Gillian Keegan announces plans to ban pupils from using mobile phones at schools, both in lessons and during breaktime.
  - A gas tank explodes at the Severn Trent Green Power site in Cassington, Oxfordshire, after it is struck by lightning.
  - A boy is taken to hospital in a critical condition along with a man in his 50s after both are hit by lightning during a football match at The Sele School in Hertford.
- 3 October –
  - Appearing at Sheffield Crown Court, a 13-year-old boy admits causing the death of Marcia Grant, 60, by running her over with her own car in the Greenhill area of Sheffield in April 2023.
  - Following a trial at Worcester Crown Court, food processing factory worker Garry Jones, who contaminated food destined for Nando's with plastic gloves, plastic bags and metal ring pulls is sentenced to three years in prison.
- 4 October – Sunak confirms plans to replace A Levels and T Levels in England with a new qualification called the Advanced British Standard.
- 5 October –
  - Historic England says it has discovered damage to Hadrian's Wall next to the felled Sycamore Gap Tree.
  - An inquest is opened and adjourned into the M53 motorway coach crash.
- 8 October –
  - Part of the Grade II listed Old Courthouse in Cockermouth, Cumbria, collapses into the River Cocker.
  - A Study published by Altus Group indicates that 383 pubs closed in England during the first six months of 2023, including 46 in London.
- 9 October – Medway Council in Kent cancels its 2023 Christmas lights due to what it describes as a "challenging financial situation".
- 11 October –
  - South Yorkshire Police says it is making "ongoing" inquiries after video footage emerged of a man climbing onto the roof of Sheffield Town Hall to replace an Israeli flag with a Palestinian one.
  - An Independent Monitoring Board report into Wandsworth Prison has concluded that the prison is "unsafe and inhumane"; the report was prepared before the escape of Daniel Khalife in September.
- 12 October –
  - Following reports that some student societies have been distributing leaflets in support of Hamas, education ministers Gillian Keegan and Robert Halfon have written to university vice chancellors in England urging them to "act swiftly and decisively against any threats" to students' safety and welfare.
  - The number of people waiting for planned NHS treatment in England rises to 7.75 million.
- 13 October –
  - Three Jewish schools in north London have closed for the day amid safety concerns for their students because of the ongoing conflict between Israel and Hamas.
  - Police have detailed a 22-year-old woman on suspicion of supporting Hamas, which is a prescribed terrorist organisation in the UK, following a speech given at a protest in Brighton on 8 October.
  - Adil Iqbal, who was sentenced to 12 years in prison for causing the death of Frankie Jules-Hough by dangerous driving on the M66 in Bury, Greater Manchester, on 13 May, has the sentence increased to 15 years by the Court of Appeal.
- 14 October – A BBC investigation has discovered inequalities in IVF treatment for same-sex couples in England, with them often having to prove their eligibility above and beyond that needed for heterosexual couples, or pay for private treatment rather than it being readily available through the NHS.
- 15 October – A points failure at London's Euston station leads to the closure of all lines from the station and severe delays to train services.
- 16 October – Twelve people are hurt after a bus crashes into a café in Manchester; the driver is arrested on suspicion of dangerous driving. A woman injured in the crash dies in hospital the following day.
- 17 October – The climate change activist Greta Thunberg is arrested by police at an anti-fossil fuel protest in London. She is subsequently charged with a public order offence and bailed to appear at a hearing in November.
- 19 October –
  - Two Parliamentary by-elections are scheduled to take place in Mid Bedfordshire and Tamworth.
  - Comedian Omid Djalili cancels a performance at Market Drayton in Shropshire because of "personal threats due to the situation in Israel".
  - The mother of a black 13-year-old boy from Hackney in East London expresses her anger over an incident in July during which he was detained by police after they thought his water pistol was a gun. The Independent Office for Police Conduct launches an investigation into the incident the following day.
  - The UK government publishes an updated list of 214 schools and colleges in England affected by reinforced autoclaved aerated concrete.
- 20 October –
  - 2023 Mid Bedfordshire by-election: Labour MP Alistair Strathern wins the constituency of Mid Bedfordshire, with the Conservatives' share of the vote falling by 28.7%, one of the largest swings of the post-war era.
  - 2023 Tamworth by-election: Labour MP Sarah Edwards wins the constituency of Tamworth, with the Conservatives' share of the vote falling by 25.6%.
  - Leeds Bradford Airport is closed, causing delays to flights, after a TUI plane skids on the runway during landing as a result of heavy rainfall caused by Storm Babet. The airport reopens again the following day.
  - Scotland Yard has reported an increase in the number of antisemitic crimes in London since the start of the Israel–Hamas conflict, with 218 incidents reported between 1 and 18 October; the number of incidents reported over the same period in 2022 was 15.
- 21 October –
  - The UK government announces reforms to recycling in England that will see the majority of households receive a weekly collection of food waste by 2026, and a designated list of items councils must recycle.
  - Police and Transport for London officials are investigating after video emerged online of a tube driver on the Central Line chanting pro-Palestinian slogans on a train. The driver is subsequently suspended pending an investigation by TfL.
  - London's King's Cross railway station is temporarily closed due to overcrowding as passengers are warned not to travel by train because of disruptions caused by Storm Babet.
  - Police launch an investigation after three men escape from HM Prison Hollesley Bay on the same day.
- 22 October – Storm Babet: Residents of 500 properties in Retford, Nottinghamshire are urged to evacuate as Nottinghamshire County Council declares a major flooding incident.
- 27 October –
  - Sixteen people, including a prison health worker, are sentenced to prison for their part in a drugs smuggling ring operating at HM Prison Lindholme.
  - Instances of antisemitic crime have continued to increase in London since the start of the Israel–Hamas conflict, with 408 cases occurring since 1 October, compared to 28 for the same period in 2022.
- 28 October –
  - The Priory Meadow Shopping Centre in Hastings is evacuated after rain causes heavy flooding in the town.
  - Nottingham Panthers forward Adam Johnson dies after receiving a serious cut to the neck from an ice skate during a match with the Sheffield Steelers.
  - Cars and property are damaged after a tornado strikes Littlehampton in West Sussex.
- 29 October – Nine people are taken to hospital after a car crashes into a bus stop in Aldwych, central London.
- 30 October – Ealing Central Library is closed temporarily after bed bugs are discovered in the furnishings.

=== November ===
- 1 November -
  - Resident Craig Dentith’s fury over ‘appalling’ state of unfinished Winsford estate

https://www.northwichguardian.co.uk/news/23892480.residents-fury-appalling-state-unfinished-development/

- 2 November – Andy Street, the Mayor of the West Midlands, has written to the Home Secretary requesting that his office be granted the powers of the area's Police and Crime Commissioner after the next mayoral election because "crime in this region has more than doubled... and I simply cannot allow it to go on any longer".
- 5 November –
  - The Metropolitan Police ends its relationship with adviser Attiq Malik after video emerged of him chanting a pro-Palestinian slogan during a speech to a group in 2021.
  - Surrey County Council declares an emergency after thousands of properties are left without water following a technical problem at a Thames Water treatment works, which is attributed to Storm Ciarán.
- 7 November –
  - Anastrozole, a drug used for a number of years to treat breast cancer, is licensed for use in England as a preventative option.
  - West Yorkshire Police launch a murder investigation after a 15-year-old boy dies following a stabbing near a school in Leeds. He is later named as Alfie Lewis, a former student at Horsforth School.
- 9 November –
  - A 14-year-old boy is remanded in custody charged with the murder of Alfie Lewis.
  - Labour's Caroline Woodley is elected mayor of Hackney in London in a by-election.
- 10 November –
  - Following trial and conviction at Leicester Crown Court, Katie Tidmarsh is sentenced to life imprisonment with a minimum term of 17 years for the 2012 murder of Ruby Thompson, a one-year-old child she had hoped to adopt.
  - A coroner's inquest into the deaths of Lancashire couple John and Susan Cooper, who died while on holiday in Egypt in August 2018, concludes their deaths occurred as a result of carbon monoxide poisoning brought about by the use of a substance containing dichloromethane to kill bed bugs in an adjoining hotel room.
- 13 November – Police confirm that three children are among five members of the same family to have been killed in a house fire in London the previous day. A sixth person subsequently dies in hospital a few days later.
- 14 November – Around 400 are evacuated from Barton House, the oldest tower block in Bristol, after a survey carried out by Bristol City Council identified structural and fire safety concerns with the building.
- 16 November –
  - The Department for Education asks the exams regulator, Ofqual, to extend extra support for GCSE students in England for another year as a way to help against the impact of COVID-19 on students taking examinations.
  - Convicted murderer Ron Evans, 82, also known as the Clifton Rapist, is sentenced to four years in prison after he was earlier convicted of sexually assaulting a woman he met at a community centre.
  - Cumbria Police confirm that a 16-year-old boy arrested in connection with the felling of the Sycamore Gap tree will face no further action.
  - Two 12-year-old boys are charged with the murder of 19-year-old Shawn Seesahai, who was fatally stabbed in Wolverhampton three days earlier.
- 17 November – Anton Hull, a drink-driver who filmed himself at the wheel saying he was "smashed" then went on to bill 29-year-old Sarah Baker in a crash in Somerset, is sentenced to six years imprisonment and given a nine-year driving ban.
- 18 November –
  - Businesses in London have urged the UK government to relax Sunday trading hours because of the cost of living crisis, estimating longer trading hours would generate an extra £300m a year.
  - A study of Bradford's Pakistani community finds that cousin marriage has dropped sharply over the past decade, with 60% of parents born to cousins ten years ago compared to 46% now.
  - Ice hockey team Nottingham Panthers play their first game since the death of Adam Johnson. The Adam Johnson Memorial Game is played against Manchester Storm.
- 19 November – An earthquake measuring 2.7 magnitude strikes parts of Cornwall at 12.50am.
- 20 November – Four men are convicted of the August 2022 murder of Ashley Dale in Liverpool following a disagreement involving her boyfriend.
- 21 November – North Hertfordshire Museum announces it will reclassify the Roman Emperor Elagabalus as a trans woman in its display about the historical figure because classical texts claim the emperor once said "call me not Lord, for I am a Lady".
- 22 November – James Witham, Joseph Peers, Niall Barry, and Sean Zeisz are each sentenced to life imprisonment with minimum terms of over 40 years for the murder of Ashley Dale.
- 23 November – A man is shot dead by armed police in Dagenham after telling Met officers he wanted to kill himself and had loaded guns. The matter is automatically referred to the Independent Office for Police Conduct.
- 24 November – West Midlands Police is placed into special measures by Home Secretary James Cleverly after a review found it was not be effectively investigating or managing the risk to the public of sex offenders.
- 28 November – The Department for Education launches a consultation on how best to provide a minimum service level in schools in England during teaching strikes.
- 29 November –
  - Natural England announces that England will be getting a new National Park. The Chilterns, The Cotswolds and Dorset could become new National Parks.
  - Nottingham City Council declares itself effectively bankrupt, with a £23m overspend forecast for the 2023–24 financial year.
  - Bigamist Jason Hayter of Frinton-on-Sea, Essex, is sentenced to eight weeks in prison suspended for 12 months and placed under night curfew for being married to two women simultaneously.
- 30 November – At least three police officers are injured during disorder ahead of a football match between Aston Villa and Legia Warsaw in Birmingham. Aston Villa confirms that no away fans were let into the stadium on the advice of police following the trouble.

=== December ===
- 1 December – Everton Football Club launch an appeal against the decision to dock them ten Premier League points.
- 2 December –
  - Havering London Borough Council reverses its decision to cancel the display of Hanukkah candles outside its town hall, having previously said the display would not go ahead because of "escalating tensions from the conflict in the Middle East".
  - Police declare a major incident in Cumbria, which is affected by heavy snowfall. As much as 30 cm has fallen by the following day.
- 5 December –
  - Junior doctors in England will stage further strike action after rejecting the latest pay offer, the British Medical Association confirms, with a three-day strike scheduled to begin on 20 December and a six-day strike scheduled to begin on 3 January 2024.
  - A woman, later named as Lianne Gordon, is shot dead in an incident in east London. A teenage boy and a man are also injured in the shooting.
- 6 December – Mayor of the West Midlands Andy Street confirms the Home Secretary has authorised his application to have the powers of the West Midlands Police and Crime Commissioner subsumed into his mayoral role from May 2024.
- 7 December –
  - An inquest into the death of Ruth Perry rules that an Ofsted report "likely contributed" to the head teacher taking her life in January 2023.
  - Six former Metropolitan Police officers are given suspended sentences after sending racist, sexist and homophobic WhatsApp messages.
- 9 December – A 16-year-old boy is charged with the murder of Lianne Gordon.
- 10 December –
  - The Metropolitan Police confirms that Deveca Rose, a 29-year-old mother, whose four children died in a South London house fire in December 2021, has been charged with manslaughter. Rose also faces charges of child abandonment.
  - The skull of a pliosaur has been excavated from the cliffs of Dorset's Jurassic Coast.
  - McDonald's says it has "permanently removed" a "third party security guard" who was filmed the previous day kicking a homeless man's possessions out of the way while mopping the floor outside the food outlet's premises in Victoria Street, London. The footage gained public attention after it was posted on social media.
- 11 December –
  - Following a trial at the Old Bailey, Ashana Studholme, Lisa Richardson and Shaun Pendlebury are convicted of the September 2022 murder of Shakira Spencer, a west London mother-of-two, who was tortured, starved and beaten to death by the trio.
  - The Association of School and College Leaders (ASCL) and National Association of Head Teachers (NAHT) issue a joint statement calling for the immediate pause of Ofsted inspections following the outcome of the inquest into the death of Ruth Perry.
- 12 December –
  - Nottingham City Council outlines a programme of cost savings, including the loss of 550 jobs, as it seeks to deal with a £50m deficit.
  - At a meeting with MPs, Sir Adrian Montague, chairman of Thames Water, says that the company cannot afford to repay a £190m loan which is due in April 2024.
- 14 December – Nurse Catherine Hudson and care assistant Charlotte Wilmot are convicted and sent to prison for drugging stroke patients with unprescribed sedatives at Blackpool Victoria Hospital in 2017 and 2018 in order to have an "easy shift".
- 15 December – Police searching for Norwich mother-of-three Gaynor Lord, missing since the previous week, find a body in the city's River Wensum.
- 16 December –
  - Luton's Premier League match with Bournemouth is suspended after their captain, Tom Lockyer, collapses on the pitch.
  - The office of London mayor Sadiq Khan confirms that vehicles eligible for scrappage as part of London's Ultra Low Emission Zone scheme cannot legally be sent to Ukraine. The announcement comes after Vitali Klitschko, mayor of Kyiv, wrote to Khan suggesting the idea.
- 18 December – A body found in the River Wensum in Norwich is formally identified as that of missing Gaynor Lord.
- 19 December – The UK government publishes new guidelines advising schools in England on how to deal with pupils who wish to change their gender, be known under a different name or wear different uniform, urging schools to "take a very cautious approach" and to inform parents of any gender related issues. An annotated draft of the document subsequently emerges, which suggests lawyers have concerns about the guidelines.
- 20 December –
  - Junior doctors in England begin another three-day strike over their long-running pay dispute.
  - Following his trial and conviction at Bristol Crown Court, Darren Osment, 40, is sentenced to life imprisonment with a minimum of 20 years for the 2012 murder of his partner, Claire Holland, 32, whose body has never been found.
  - Following a trial at Birmingham Crown Court, Kian Durnin, Martinho De-Sousa, and Tireq McIntosh, are each sentenced to 23 years in prison for their part in a shooting attack at a Wolverhampton park during which two children were injured.
- 21 December – The UK government confirms that British Sign Language will be taught at GCSE level in England from September 2025.
- 22 December – Secretary of State for Transport Mark Harper announces that regulated train fares in England will rise by 4.9% from March 2024.
- 23 December – Rebecca Welch becomes the first female referee to officiate at a Premier League match as Fulham play Burnley at Craven Cottage.
- 24 December – A 22-year-old woman is stabbed to death during an incident in Bermondsey, south London. A 16-year-old boy is subsequently arrested on suspicion of murder.
- 26 December – Sam Allison becomes the first black referee to take charge of a Premier League match for 15 years when he officiates at Sheffield United's game against Luton Town.
- 27 December – A murder investigation is under way after a car struck a crowd of people outside a property in Sheffield, South Yorkshire, killing a 40-year-old man.
- 28 December –
  - Three men are drowned after a 4x4 vehicle plunges into the River Esk in North Yorkshire.
  - Six fire appliances are called to a suspected fire at the top of Blackpool Tower, which turns out to be orange netting blowing in the wind.

== Deaths ==
- 28 March – Paul O'Grady, comedian, actor and drag queen (born 1955)
- 22 April – Len Goodman, ballroom dancer and television personality (born 1944)
- 26 November – Terry Venables, football player and manager (born 1943)

== See also ==
- 2023 in the United Kingdom
- 2023 in Northern Ireland
- 2023 in Scotland
- 2023 in Wales
