= John Boys Smith =

British priest and academic

Smith in 1960.

John Sandwith Boys Smith (8 January 1901 – 3 November 1991) was a 20th-century British priest and academic.

Boys Smith was born in Hordle, Hampshire, in 1901. He was educated at Sherborne School and St John's College, Cambridge. He was ordained in 1927. After a curacy in Sutton Coldfield he returned to St John's where he was to stay until his retirement in 1969. He was its Chaplain from 1927 to 1934; a Fellow from 1927 until 1959; Tutor from 1934 to 1939; Junior Bursar from 1939 to 1944; Senior Bursar from 1944 to 1959; and Master from 1959 to 1969. He was Vice-Chancellor of the University of Cambridge from 1963 to 1965. In 1968, he was made an honorary fellow of Trinity College Dublin. He died in Herne Hill in 1991.

His aunt was Winifred Boys-Smith, a university professor at Otago University. His brother was Humphry Boys-Smith DSO DSC RNR "one of the most successful Merchant Navy officers serving with the RNR during the second world war." His grandson is Nicholas Boys Smith, founder of Create Streets.

Academic offices
Preceded by James Mann Wordie	Master of St John's College, Cambridge; 1959–1969	Succeeded by Philip Nicholas Seton Mansergh
Preceded by Ivor Jennings	Vice-Chancellor of the University of Cambridge; 1963–1965	Succeeded by Arthur Armitage
