= Earthquake rotational loading =

Typical engineering applications illustrating the need for considering spatially variable seismic ground motions (SVSGMs) in the design of structures.

Earthquake rotational loading indicates the excitation of structures due to the torsional and rocking components of seismic actions. Nathan M. Newmark was the first researcher who showed that this type of loading may result in unexpected failure of structures, and its influence should be considered in design codes. There are various phenomena that may lead to the earthquake rotational loading of structures, such as propagation of body wave, surface wave, special rotational wave, block rotation, topographic effect, and soil structure interaction.

One of challenges in structural engineering is defining reliable and accurate loading patterns for design of earthquake-resistant structures based on all components of seismic motions, i.e., three translational and three rotational components. From earthquake engineering perspective, it is usually assumed that the rotational components of strong ground motions are induced due to the spatial variation of the seismic waves and, consequently, these components are estimated in terms of corresponding translational components. When the earthquake shaking can be specified at a single point, the rotational loading of structures can be performed by point rotation, which corresponds with gradient of a point on the ground surface. Most investigations on the earthquake rotational loading, by considering the effect of point rotation on the behavior of structures have shown that the rotational components based on their frequency content can severely change dynamic behavior of structures, which are sensitive to high-frequency motions, such as secondary systems, historical monuments, nuclear reactors, tall asymmetric buildings or irregular frames, slender tower shape structures, bridges, vertically irregular structures, and even ordinary multi-story buildings. The contribution of the rotational components to the seismic response of structures supported on the rigid mat foundation can even be amplified if the effects of the kinematic and dynamic soil structure interaction are considered in structural loading and modeling. In a recent study, the combined action of the rotational loading and multi-support excitation on the seismic behavior of short-span bridges was investigated. The numerical results suggested that depending on structure properties and excitation characteristics, rotational components decrease beneficial effects of multi-support excitation on the structure response.

In spite of the fact that the rotational components may significantly affect the seismic behavior of structures, their influence is not currently considered in most modern design codes, which the main reasons of this ignorance may be attributed to: (1) lack of sufficient recorded data on the rotational accelerations; (2) difficulty in presenting a quantitative assessment of the rotational acceleration components for given translational components; (3) complexity in derivation of simplified seismic loading patterns for structures subjected to rotational excitations, and (4) lack of commercial computing programs for structural analysis. To better understand the effects of the rotational components on the seismic behavior of structures, recently, new seismic intensity parameters were proposed to evaluate the contribution of the rotational components to the structural response.
