= 2020 in England =

- Centuries: 19th; 20th; 21st
- Decades: 2000s; 2010s; 2020s
- See also: 2019–20 in English football 2020–21 in English football 2020 in the United Kingdom; Other events of 2020

Events from 2020 in England

== Incumbent ==
- Monarch - Elizabeth II
- Prime Minister - Boris Johnson

== Events ==
=== January ===
- 6 January – Reynhard Sinaga, described as "the most prolific rapist in British legal history", is sentenced to life in prison with a minimum term of 30 years, after being found guilty of raping or sexually assaulting 48 men in Manchester. Police believe he may have been responsible for assaulting a total of nearly 200 victims.
- 9 January – Five members of prison staff are injured when they are attacked by two inmates at Whitemoor Prison in Cambridgeshire; the Metropolitan Police subsequently announces that the incident is being treated as a terrorist incident.
- 10 January – Gemma Watts, a 21-year-old woman from Enfield, north London who disguised herself as a 16-year-old boy to sexually assault teenage girls she had groomed online, is sentenced to eight years imprisonment after pleading guilty at Winchester Crown Court to charges involving four girls. Police believe she may be responsible for assaulting as many as 50 victims.
- 23 January – An earthquake of 3.0 magnitude is recorded by the British Geological Survey in Stockton-on-Tees, County Durham, just before 6 am.
- 31 January – COVID-19 first confirmed to have spread to England with two cases in York.

=== February ===
- 2 February – A man is shot dead by police in South London after a stabbing incident on Streatham High Road; police treat the incident as terrorist-related.
- 10 February – In a "historic" decision, councillors reject a proposed expansion of Bristol Airport, by 18 votes to seven, on the grounds that it would exacerbate climate change, damage the health of local people, and harm flora and fauna.
- 24 February – The Football Association bans children under the age of twelve from heading footballs during training sessions.
- 25 February – A landmark study shows that life expectancy in England has stalled for the first time in more than 100 years and that health inequalities are growing wider than a decade ago. The study said that this can largely be attributed to the UK government's austerity policies.
- 27 February – Count Binface announces he will run for Mayor of London.

=== March ===
- 13 March – COVID-19 in the England: Elections including the English local elections, London mayoral election and police and crime commissioner elections, scheduled for May 2020, are postponed for a year because of the coronavirus pandemic.

=== May ===
- 17 May - Murder of Aya Hachem
- 20 May - An opt-out organ donation law comes into force in England which hopefully would lead to an additional 700 transplants by 2023.

=== June ===
- 16 June - Murder of Arthur Labinjo-Hughes
- 20 June - 2020 Reading stabbings
- 21 June - 2020 Moss Side shooting

=== August ===
- 18 August - Health Secretary Matt Hancock announces that Public Health England is to be "scrapped" and replaced by a new body run by Dido Harding, called the National Institute for Health Protection and it will aim to combine PHE and the NHS Test and Trace operation, in response to the coronavirus pandemic.
- 25 August - Ofqual chief, Sally Collier, resigns after thousands of students' marks were downgraded for exams they were unable to sit.
- 29 August – Men's and women's FA Community Shield.

=== September ===
- 9 September – COVID-19 in the England: The government announces a ban on social gatherings of more than six people in England and will be enforced from the 14 September - with some exceptions such as schools, workplaces or COVID-secure weddings, funerals and organised team sports.
- 24 September – The derelict Orchid Gardens Hotel in Bournemouth is destroyed by fire.
- 25 September – Sgt Matiu Ratana, a long serving police officer with the Metropolitan Police, is shot dead during an incident at a custody centre in Croydon, London.

=== October ===
- 1 October – Plastic drinking straws, cotton buds and drink stirrers are banned in England.

== See also ==
- 2020 in Northern Ireland
- 2020 in Scotland
- 2020 in Wales
