= Preston Crown Court =

Criminal court in Preston, Lancashire, England

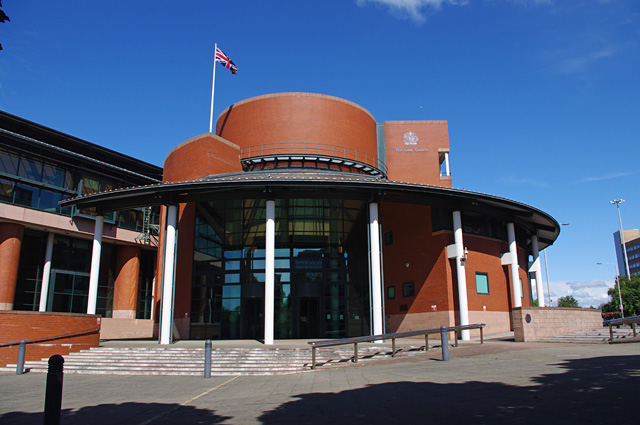
- The main entrance to the building

- Location within Preston city centre
- Alternative names: Preston Combined Court Centre

General information
- Location: The Law Courts, Openshaw Place, Ring Way, Preston, England
- Coordinates: 53.7624°N 2.6989°W
- Opened: 1996; 30 years ago

Design and construction
- Architect: Alistair Sutherland
- Architecture firm: Austin-Smith:Lord

Website
- courttribunalfinder.service.gov.uk/courts/preston-combined-court-centre

Preston Crown Court, or more properly the Crown Court at Preston, is a criminal court on the Ring Way in Preston, Lancashire, England. The court is based on two sites in the city; Preston Combined Court Centre on Ringway and Sessions House on Lancaster Road. As a first tier court centre, the court deals with all types of cases that are heard in the Crown Court as well as being a trial centre for civil High Court cases; it is also a venue for the County Court where smaller civil cases and family cases are dealt with.

== History ==
Until the mid-1980s, all Crown Court cases were heard at the Sessions House on Lancaster Road. However, as the number of court cases in Preston grew, it became necessary to commission a more substantial courthouse for both criminal and civil matters. The site selected by the Lord Chancellor's Department was occupied by the Saul Street Public Baths which had been built in 1936.

The current combined court centre building was designed by Alistair Sutherland of architects Austin-Smith:Lord, built in red brick and glass and was opened in 1996. The design involved an asymmetrical main frontage of 15 bays facing onto Ringway, curving round towards Saul Street and, connected by a glass entrance section, meeting another section of five bays also facing onto Ringway but set back from the road. The glass entrance section, which featured columns supporting a canopy and a brick drum-shaped structure, led to a full-height atrium. Internally, the building was equipped with ten courtrooms.

Notable cases heard in the courthouse have included the trial and conviction, in February 2013, of Dale Cregan for the murders of Nicola Hughes and Fiona Bone the trial and conviction, in May 2014, of Stuart Hall for indecent assault and the trial and conviction, in August 2021, of seven men for the murder of Aya Hachem.

Cases have also included the trials and subsequent acquittals of William Roache over rape allegations in January 2014, of Nigel Evans over sexual assault allegations in April 2014 and of Chief Superintendent David Duckenfield, who was match commander at the time of the Hillsborough disaster, over allegations of gross negligence manslaughter in November 2019.
