= Rotational components of strong ground motions =

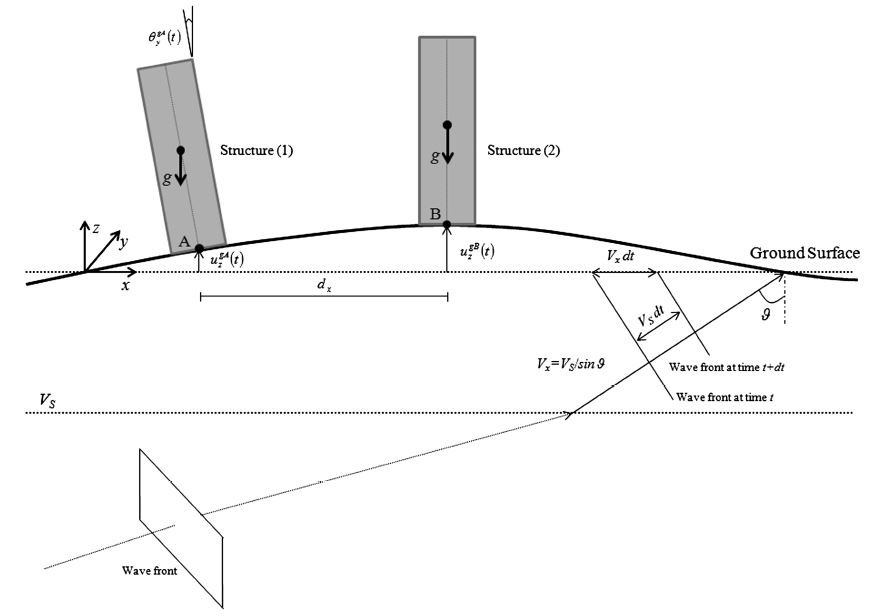
Geometric layout for the seismic wave propagation and estimation of the rocking component of seismic ground motions.

Rotational components of strong ground motions refer to variations of the natural slope of the ground surface due to the propagation of seismic waves. Earthquakes induce three translational (two horizontal and one vertical) and three rotational (two rocking and one torsional) motions on the ground surface. To study the nature of strong ground motions, seismologists and earthquake engineers deploy accelerometers and seismometers at various distances from active faults on the ground surface or bedrock in order to record the translational motions of ground shaking. The corresponding rotational motions are, then, estimated in terms of the gradient of the recorded translational ground motions. Different methods may be adopted for the indirect estimation of the earthquake rotational components, such as time derivation and finite difference. Specialized instruments, such as gyroscopes and tiltmeters, which can detect small changes in the orientation of the ground surface, may be used to directly measure rotational ground motions. Currently, ring laser gyroscopes are widely used to measure the amplitude of rotational movements of the ground surface.

In most seismic codes, the excitation due to the translational components is solely considered in the design of resistant structures against earthquakes, and the effect of the rotational components of strong ground motions is commonly ignored. However, recent seismological data indicated that the ratio of the amplitude of the rotational components to the translational components at close distances from the fault can be significantly larger than that was expected. In the past decades, this observation led to the attraction of theoretical studies towards near-field effects of the earthquake rotational loading on the structural response. The results of these studies implied that the rotational components may result in significant damage of structures sensitive to high-frequency excitations, and, hence, their influence should be incorporated in seismic codes. For the first time, new seismic parameters were proposed to estimate the effect of the rotational excitation on the seismic response of structures.
