= Sessions House, Preston =

Courthouse in Lancashire, England

Sessions House
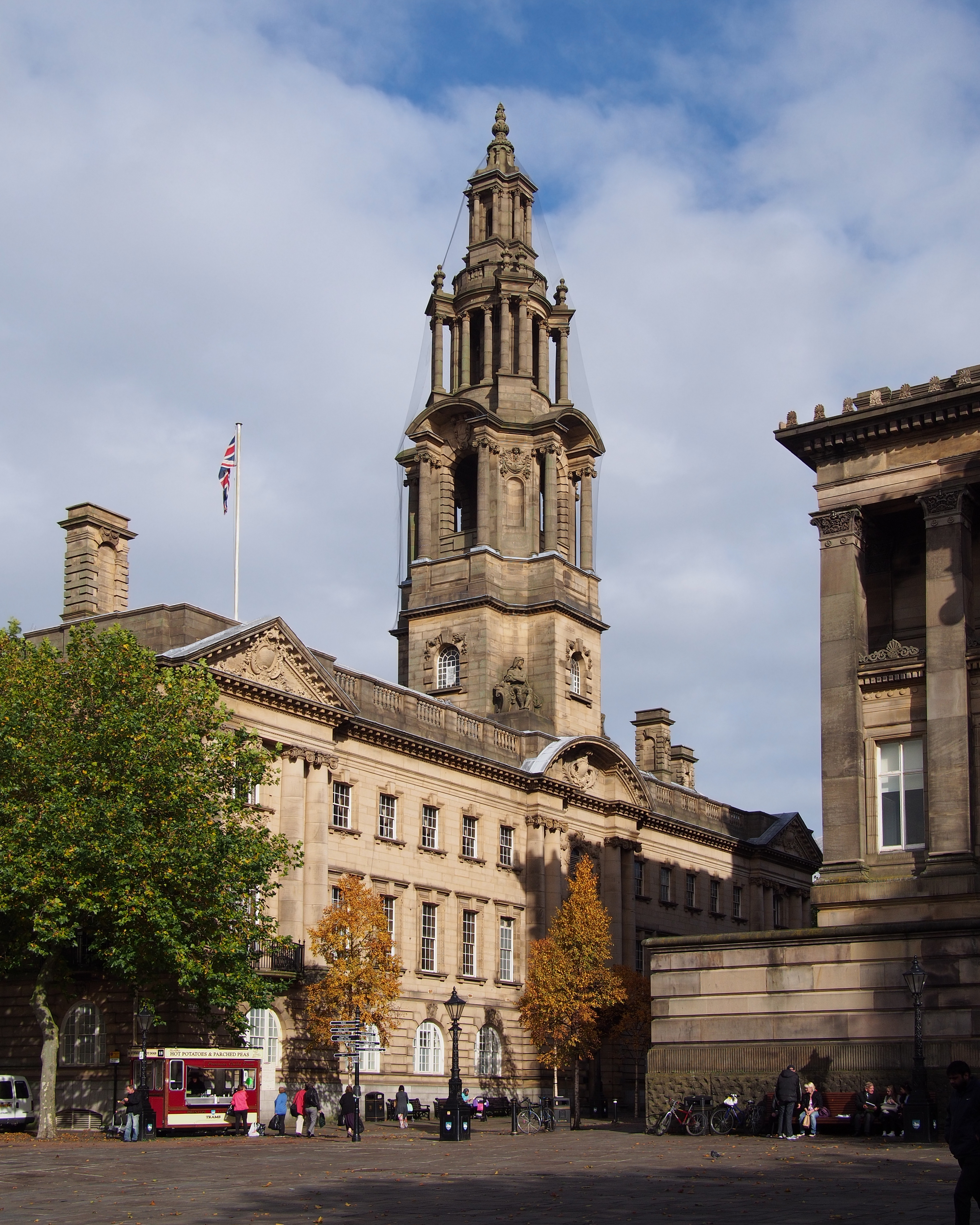

- Location within Preston City centre

General information
- Architectural style: Edwardian Baroque
- Location: Preston, Lancashire, England
- Coordinates: 53.7596°N 2.6987°W
- Year built: 1904
- Governing body: His Majesty's Courts and Tribunals Service

Design and construction
- Architect: Henry Littler

Listed Building – Grade II*
- Official name: Sessions House
- Designated: 27 September 1979
- Reference no.: 1279796

The Sessions House is a courthouse on Harris Street in Preston, Lancashire, England. The courthouse, which continues to be used for judicial purposes as well as being used as administrative offices for His Majesty's Courts and Tribunals Service, is a Grade II* listed building.

== History ==
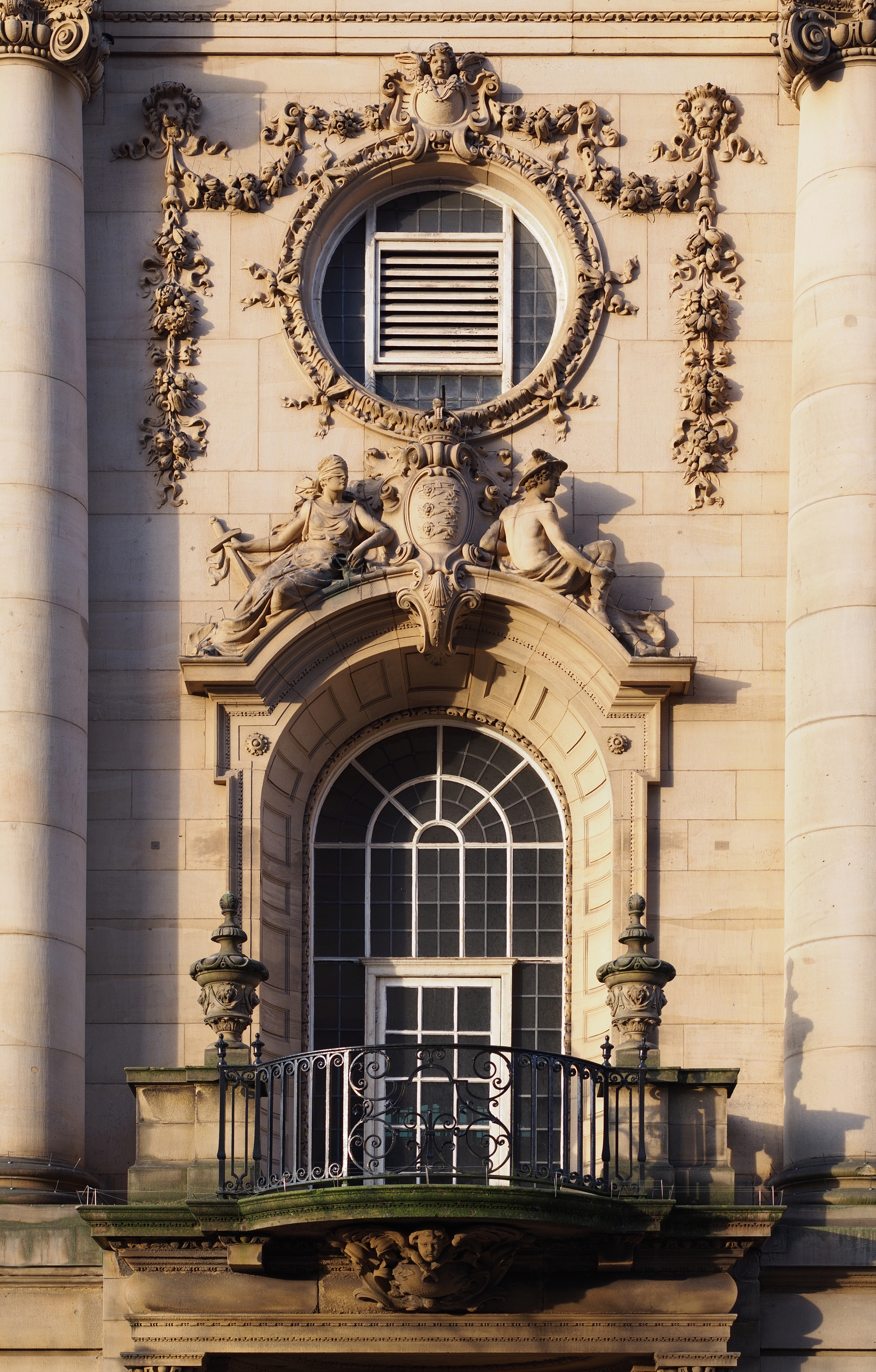
Detail of the balcony and window above the main entrance on Harris Street

The building was commissioned to replace the old Sessions House on Stanley Street which had been built in 1829. After deciding that the old Sessions House was inadequate for their needs, the justices decided to procure a new building: the site selected was some open land opposite the Harris Museum.

The foundation stone for the new building was laid by Frederick Stanley, 16th Earl of Derby, in a ceremony presided over by Sir J. T. Hibbert, on 2 February 1900. It was designed by the Manchester architect, Henry Littler, in the Edwardian Baroque style, constructed by David Tullis and Sons and opened on 18 June 1904. The cost of the building was estimated at the start of its construction to be £90,000, the equivalent of more than £9 million in 2023. The masonry is Longridge stone throughout.

The design involved a symmetrical main frontage of thirteen bays facing Harris Street. The central section featured a round-headed doorway with a balcony above; there was a round-headed window with elaborate detailing on the first floor and oculus on the second floor flanked by huge Ionic order columns which spanned the second and third floors. There was a four-stage tower above, which at 54.7 metres (179.5 ft) tall, made the building one of the tallest buildings in Preston.

Cases heard within the sessions house have included the trials and subsequent convictions of Jon Venables and Robert Thompson for the murder of James Bulger in November 1993 and of Harold Shipman for the murder of 15 patients under his care in January 2000.

Internally, there are two courtrooms on the first floor that are used daily by Preston Crown Court together with two smaller courtrooms on the ground floor used by the County Court and the Family Court. The Courts Service Area Director's office for Lancashire and Cumbria is also situated in the building.

== See also ==
- Grade II* listed buildings in Lancashire
- Listed buildings in Preston, Lancashire
