= List of tallest buildings and structures in Preston =

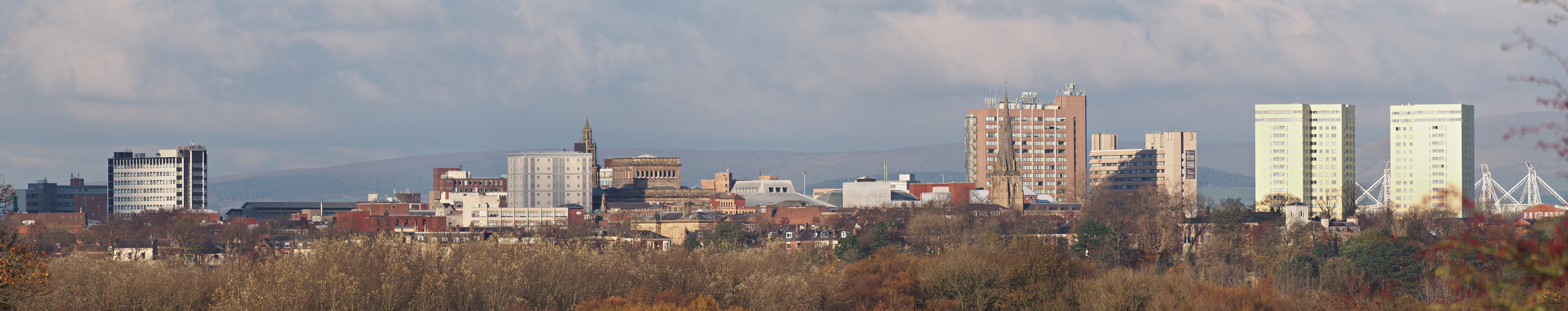
The skyline of Preston city centre

This list of the tallest buildings and structures in Preston ranks skyscrapers and structures in Preston, England by height. There are currently 12 structures in the city over 150 feet (46 m); the majority of these were built in the 1960s and 1970s. Since its completion in 1854 the 308-foot (94 m) tall Church of St. Walburge has remained the tallest building in Preston. It is also the 8th tallest free-standing structure in North West England (behind various buildings in Manchester, Liverpool and Blackpool), and the tallest church in the United Kingdom (excluding cathedrals). There are currently no buildings under construction or approved for construction that will take the title from it.

Until they were demolished in 1983, the tallest structures in Preston were the twin chimneys of the Courtaulds textile factory at Red Scar, Ribbleton. They were 365 feet (111 m) high.

== Tallest buildings and structures ==
An equal sign (=) following a rank indicates the same height between two or more buildings.

Rank	Name	Use	Image	Height (m)	Height (ft)	Floors	Year	Notes
1	Church of St. Walburge	Place of Worship		94	308	N/A	1854	
2	St John's Minster	Place of Worship		63	207	N/A	1855	
3	Guild Centre	Office		61	200	15		
4	Unicentre	Office		59	194	14		
5	Sessions House	Courthouse		55	179	3	1903	
6=	Avenham 1	Residential		54	177	18		
6=	Avenham 2	Residential		54	177	18		
8=	Crystal House	Office		50	164	12		
8=	Lowthian House	Office		50	164	12		
10=	Red Rose House	Office		48	157	12		
10=	Telephone House	Office		48	157	12		
12	Palatine House	Office		44	144	12		

== Tallest under construction, approved and proposed ==
=== Approved ===
Name	Use	Image	Height (m)	Height (ft)	Floors	Notes
The Linen Building	Residential		52	171	17	
