= Sandy Grant Gordon =

Scottish distiller (1931–2020)

Sandy Grant Gordon CBE
- Born: Alexander Grant Gordon; 6 May 1931; Glasgow, Scotland
- Died: 21 December 2020 (aged 89)
- Occupation: Spirits distiller
- Known for: Pioneering single malt Scotch as a whisky product category
- Relatives: William Grant (great-grandfather); Charles Grant Gordon (brother)

Alexander Grant "Sandy" Gordon, CBE (6 May 1931 – 21 December 2020) was a Scottish distiller who was credited with creating a global market for single malt Scotch whisky. As a managing director of the William Grant and Sons Glenfiddich distillery between 1968 and 1996, he is credited with global market success of the Glenfiddich brand. He was appointed a Commander of the Order of the British Empire in 1988.

== Early life ==
Gordon was born in Glasgow, Scotland on 6 May 1931. His mother was a doctor, and his father was the chairman of William Grant and Sons, a Scottish distilling company. Gordon was the great-grandson of the founder of the company. He was initially educated in Dufftown and then attended Rugby School, Warwickshire, England. He graduated with a degree in mathematics and law from Queens' College, Cambridge. He wanted to pursue a career in law or in aircraft design, but his father's diagnosis with colorectal cancer and later death prompted him to return and join the family distilling company.

== Career ==
Gordon started out in his family's distilling company after his graduate studies in 1954 and was initially allocated managing sales for the Africa market. Reflecting on his work he later admitted that this experience showed him that his talents were not in sales. He would later return again to focus on the European market.

He was credited with creation of single malt as a category of whiskies in 1963 and his efforts in creating a global market for Glenfiddich outside of Scotland, where it was not sold earlier. Prior to his efforts, virtually all of Scotland's exports were blended whisky. He was noted for his ability to forecast trends, particularly in the 1980s when strict laws against drinking coupled with high taxes caused a global slump in sales, and later there was a revival spurred by media depictions of scotch. This was important because of the time intensive ageing element of whisky production. The family also owned the Balvenie distillery which also produced its own single malt whisky. As of 2019, Glenfiddich was the largest selling single malt scotch whisky by volume, while both Glenfiddich and Balvenie were amongst the top 10 single malt whiskies in the global market by sales.

He was also a pioneer of whisky tourism, with his setting up of the first visitor centre for Glennfiddich Distillery in Dufftown in Scotland. The Scottish newspaper, The Herald, notes that as of 2020, almost half of all Scottish distilleries have tourist centres. He served as the Managing Director and Chairman of the Glenfiddich distillery from 1968 until 1996 and held ownership within the family at a time when many distilleries were coming under foreign control.

He was also a supporter of the Scottish arts and culture. In the early 1990s, he had made contributions as the chairman of the trust, toward the building of the National Piping Centre in Glasgow, Scotland. He was awarded the College of Piping Award for his services to piping. He was a trustee on the Scottish Government's Board of the National Museums of Scotland and had set up a fellowship in Scottish history at the University of St Andrews. He was also the vice-chairman of the Scottish Seabird Centre, a conservation centre and had committed himself to supporting charities working with protecting endangered birds after his retirement. He had also made periodic bird-watching trips to Ethiopia, Faroe Islands, India, and Peru, after his retirement in 1996.

He was made a Commander of the Order of the British Empire (CBE) in 1988.

== Personal life ==
Gordon met his wife Linda Stobart when he was studying in Cambridge. It is noted that he later showed her a book with the costs that he had incurred while courting her. The couple had four children. Peter Gordon, one of their sons, would go on to become a Director and later a Chairman at the family distillery. His wife died in October 2019. Gordon died at his home on 21 December 2020. He was aged 89.

Gordon was active outdoors, and had climbed the 282 Munros, mountains with a height greater than 3,000 feet (914 m), in Scotland. As of 2019, the Grant Gordon family was the richest in Scotland for six years in a row.
