= George Strachan (Scottish cricketer) =

Scottish cricketer (1932–2020)

George Robson Strachan
Personal information
- Born: 29 August 1932
- Died: 9 March 2020 (aged 87)
- Source: Cricinfo, 16 March 2020

George Robson Strachan (29 August 1932 – 9 March 2020) was a Scottish cricketer who played two first-class matches for Scotland in 1965. In domestic cricket matches in Scotland, he took nearly 1,000 wickets and scored 6,000 runs during his career.
