= Nicholas Boys Smith =

British campaigner

- Education: Peterhouse, Cambridge
- Occupations: Campaigner, Researcher
- Organization: Create Streets
- Movement: New Urbanism

Nicholas John Boys Smith MBE is an English author, researcher and campaigner, best known as the founding director of Create Streets, an independent research institute that campaigns for "gentle density" in urban planning, subscribing to the ideas of New Urbanism and the New Classical architectural movements.

Many of Create Streets's ideas have become embedded in national and local planning policy, and Boys Smith has been recognised as an influential voice in this area, being described as a "building design tsar".

== Education and career ==
The grandson of John Boys Smith, former Vice-Chancellor of the University of Cambridge, Nicholas Boys Smith was educated at Westminster School and Peterhouse, Cambridge, where he read history and took a double first, later also receiving an MPhil with distinction. While at university, he was President of the Cambridge Union.

After graduating from university, Boys Smith worked at the Conservative Research Department, including as an adviser on welfare policy to the Conservative social security secretary, Peter Lilley. In 2001, he stood as the Conservative Party candidate for Walthamstow. He then became a consultant at McKinsey & Company, before joining Lloyds as a senior director. In 2006, he advised George Osborne, then Shadow Chancellor, on tax policy, as a member of his Tax Reform Commission.

Boys Smith set up the think tank Create Streets in 2012 "out of frustration with the low quality of too much recent development and of irrational decision-making." The public genesis of the organisation came through a 2013 report authored by Boys Smith and Alex Morton, titled Create Streets, co-published with Policy Exchange.

Boys Smith co-chaired the government's Building Better, Building Beautiful Commission with Roger Scruton, publishing in 2020 its final report Living With Beauty. He served as chair of the Office for Place within the Department for Levelling Up, Housing and Communities. He continued his work with the new Labour government after the 2024 general election until housing minister Matthew Pennycook suddenly closed the Office later that year, a decision Boys Smith was critical of. Despite his association with the Conservatives, Boys Smith reiterated that he considered this work non-partisan, highlighting Create Streets' history of working with local councils across the political spectrum.

Boys Smith was a Commissioner of Historic England and is a visiting professor in architecture at the University of Strathclyde and a senior research fellow at the University of Buckingham. He writes extensively on development, planning and the links between design, wellbeing, value, sustainability and public support. Boys Smith's writing has appeared in the Spectator, Evening Standard, The Times, Daily Telegraph and The Guardian.

In 2022, Boys Smith published his first book No Free Parking, a history of London's built environment, focusing on places appearing in the London version of the game Monopoly.

In 2024, Boys Smith was awarded an MBE in the New Year's Honours List for services to planning and design.

== Works ==
- "Create Streets" (PDF). (2013, Policy Exchange & Create Streets, With Alex Morton)
- "Living With Beauty" (PDF). (2020, UK Government, With Roger Scruton)
- No Free Parking (2022, Blink Publishing, ISBN 978-1789465389)
