= Murder of Aya Hachem =

2020 murder case in England

- Location: Blackburn, Lancashire, England
- Date: 17 May 2020; 6 years ago 15:00 BST
- Attack type: Drive-by shooting
- Deaths: 1
- Victim: Aya Hachem
- Perpetrator: Zamir Raja

Aya Hachem was murdered in Blackburn, Lancashire, England on 17 May 2020.

Aya Hachem was a University of Salford law student from Lebanon who moved to the UK in 2011.

At 15:00 BST on 17 May 2020, Hachem was caught in the crossfire by hitman Zamir Raja, on King Street, Blackburn, a large town in Lancashire, North West England. The killing was a drive-by shooting ordered by Feroz Suleman, manager of a tyre business whose intended target was rival businessman Pachah Khan who was nearby at the time.

After a 12-week trial at Preston Crown Court in 2021, seven men who played a part in the planned shooting were convicted of murder on 3 August and sentenced to life imprisonment on 5 August. They are: Feroz Suleman, Zamir Raja, Anthony Ennis, Ayaz Hussain, Abubakr Satia, Uthman Satia and Kashif Manzoor. Uthman Satia's girlfriend, Judy Chapman, was cleared of murder but convicted of manslaughter. She was sentenced on 1 October to 15 years imprisonment.
