= Euston shooting =

2023 mass shooting in London, England

- Location of the shooting within London
- Location: Euston Road, London, England, United Kingdom
- Date: 14 January 2023
- Attack type: Mass shooting, drive-by shooting
- Weapon: Shotgun
- Deaths: 0
- Injuries: 6

On 14 January 2023, at approximately 13:30, a mass shooting was committed with a shotgun outside St Aloysius Roman Catholic Church in Euston, London, England, where a memorial service for two women had just ended.

Six people were injured: four women (one of whom suffered potentially life-changing injuries) and two children, a twelve-year-old and a seven-year-old girl, the latter of whom was taken to hospital in life-threatening condition. She was later reported to be in a stable condition. Police appealed for information about a black car, believed to be a Toyota C-HR, that the shots were fired from.

The memorial service was for Fresia Calderon and her daughter Sara Sanchez who had died separately from natural causes in November 2022. Fresia's ex-husband, Carlos Arturo Sanchez-Coronado, was arrested in Colombia and extradited to the United Kingdom for money laundering for a London drugs gang linked to the Cali Cartel, and was jailed in 2009, serving his sentence and then moving to Santiago, where he died in 2022. This led to speculation that the attack was linked to the cartel, although Scotland Yard refused to discuss motive.

In the early hours of 16 January 2023, London's Metropolitan Police announced that a 22-year-old man had been arrested on suspicion of attempted murder. He had been detained a few hours earlier, after police stopped a car in the Borough of Barnet. He was later bailed until mid-February.

On 15 February 2024, four men were convicted of "conspiracy to wound with intent to cause harm" and one was also convicted of illegal possession of a shotgun.

On 12 April 2024, Tyrell Lacroix, 23, Jashy Perch, 20, Jordan Walters, 24, and Alrico Nelson-Martin, 20 were sentenced for a combined total of 73 years for the shooting. Lacroix was jailed for 26 years for conspiracy to wound with intent to cause serious harm. Walters was jailed for 13 years for the same offence. Perch was sentenced to 20 years in jail for conspiracy to wound with intent to cause serious harm, for having an offensive weapon, and for possession of cannabis. Nelson-Martin was jailed for 14 years for conspiracy to wound and possession of a shotgun with intent to endanger life.

== Reactions ==
Opposition leader Sir Keir Starmer, in whose constituency the attack occurred, called for tighter restrictions on who can own pump-action shotguns.
