= World War II bomb disposal in Europe =

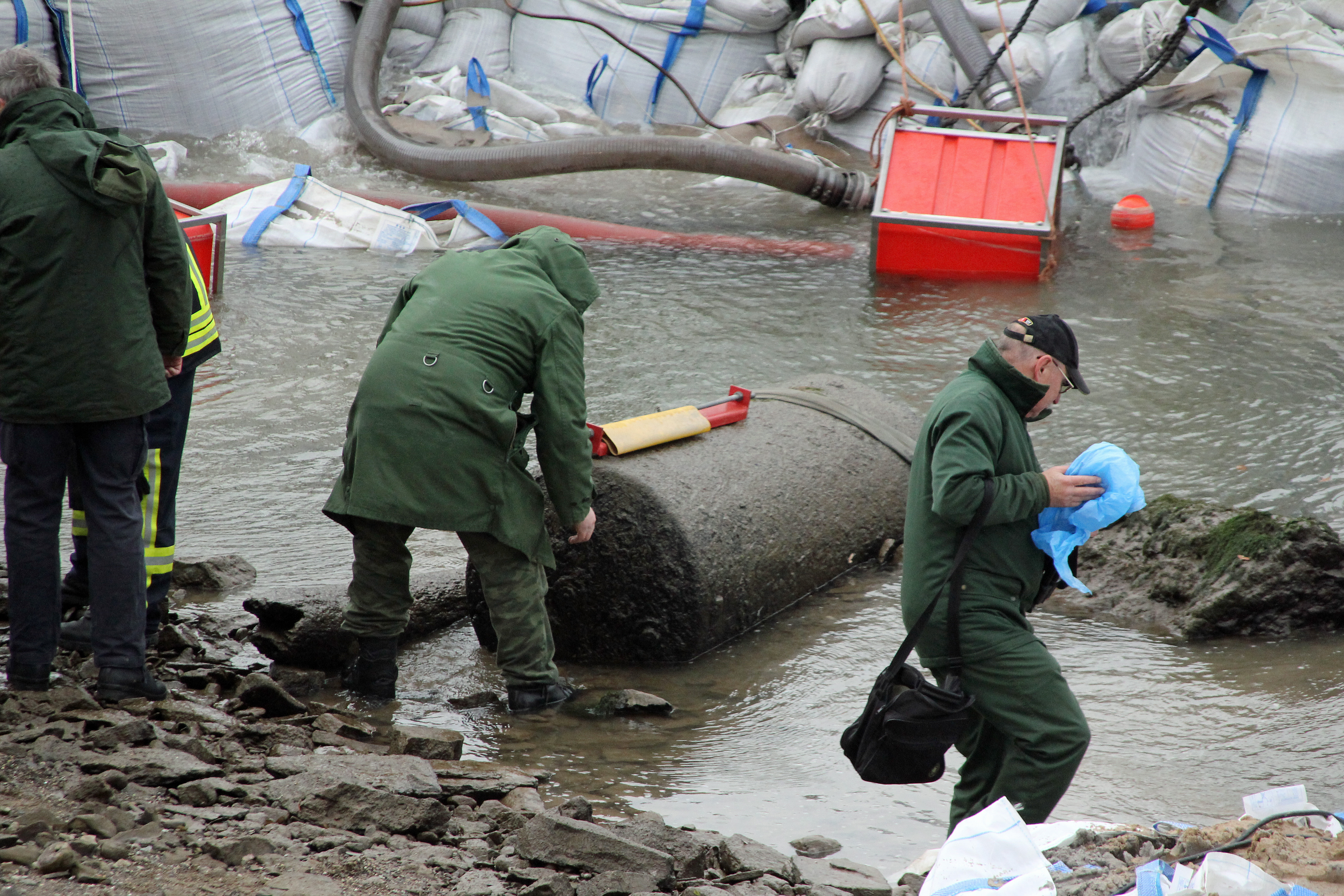
Technicians inspecting a British bomb unearthed in Koblenz, Germany in 2011

The Royal Air Force and United States Army Air Forces dropped 2.7 million tonnes of bombs on Europe during World War II. In the United Kingdom, the German Luftwaffe dropped more than 12,000 tonnes of bombs on London alone. In 2018, the British Ministry of Defence reported that 450 World War II bombs were made safe or defused since 2010 by disposal teams. Every year, an estimated 2,000 tons of World War II munitions are found in Germany, at times requiring the evacuation of tens of thousands of residents from their homes. In Berlin alone, 1.8 million pieces of ordnance have been defused between 1947 and 2018. Buried bombs, as well as mortars, land mines and grenades, are often found during construction work or other excavations, or by farmers tilling the land.

== Belgium ==
- February 2020: Hundreds of people were evacuated after construction workers discovered a World War II bomb in Maasmechelen, Limburg.

== France ==
- 7 March 2025: All Eurostar train services from London to Paris were cancelled, following the discovery of a 500 kg bomb near Gare du Nord station in Paris.

== Germany ==
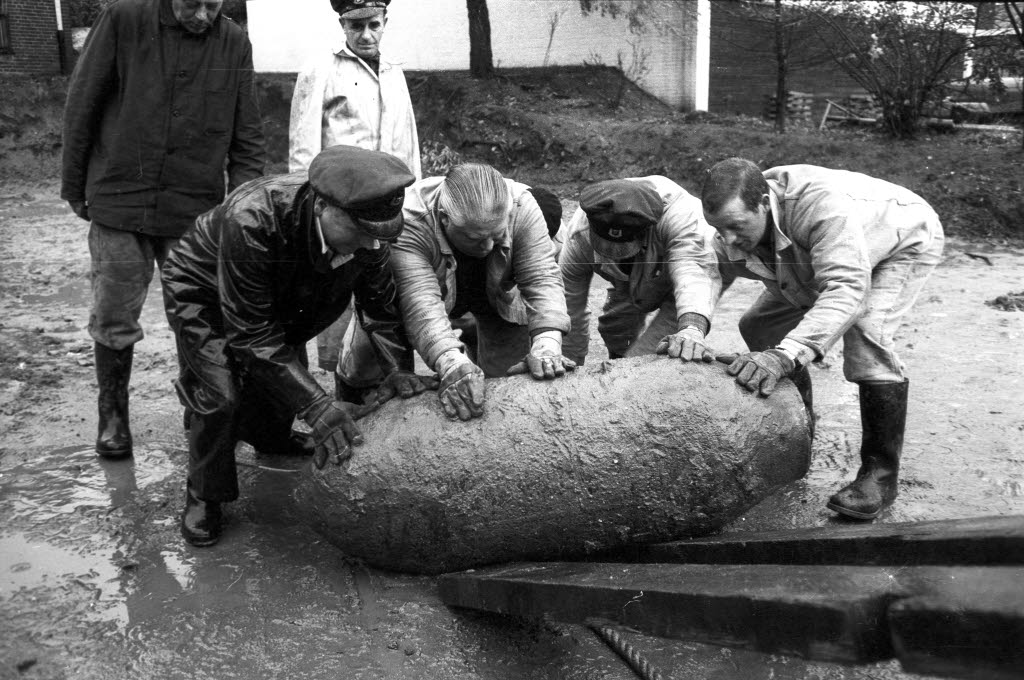
Technicians removing a 500 kg bomb in Kiel during 1969

- September 1994: A bomb exploded on a building site in Friedrichshain, Berlin, damaging many houses and killing three people.
- June 2010: 7,000 people were evacuated in Göttingen after a 500-kilogram (1,100 lb) bomb was found. Three members of the bomb-disposal unit died after the bomb exploded.
- January 2014: A construction worker in Euskirchen was killed and two critically wounded after hitting a buried bomb with an excavator.
- December 2016: A 4,000 lb (1,800 kg) World War II bomb was defused in Augsburg, requiring the evacuation of 54,000 people.
- May 2017: Three British World War II bombs were defused in Hanover, requiring the evacuation of 50,000 people.
- September 2017: A bomb dropped by the USAAF during World War II led to the evacuation of 21,000 people in Koblenz.
- September 2017: 70,000 people had to leave their homes in Frankfurt after a British bomb was discovered.
- April 2018: A 1.8-long-ton (1,800 kg) bomb found in Paderborn forced the evacuation of 26,000 people.
- April 2018: 12,000 people were evacuated in Berlin after a bomb was discovered just north of Berlin Hauptbahnhof.
- August 2018: the discovery of a World War II bomb required the evacuation of 18,500 people in Ludwigshafen.
- April 2019: 600 people were evacuated when a bomb was discovered in Frankfurt's River Main. Divers with the city's fire service were participating in a routine training exercise when they found the 500-kilogram (1,100 lb) device.
- July 2019: 16,500 people evacuated in Frankfurt when a 500-kilogram (1,100 lb) bomb was found during construction.
- January 2020: Two 250-kilogram (550 lb) World War II bombs were found in Dortmund forcing the evacuation of 14,000 residents and the closure of the city's main train station.
- April 2020: A 230-kilogram (510 lb) World War II bomb in Bonn was successfully defused but required the evacuation of 1,200 residents and 200 patients at a local hospital, including 11 people critically ill with coronavirus.
- October 2020: 10,000 office workers were evacuated, along with 15 residents in Neukölln, Berlin when a 500-kilogram (1,100 lb) World War II bomb was discovered.
- January 2021: Over 8,000 people were evacuated in Göttingen after four World War II bombs were discovered in the city centre.
- May 2021: 16,500 people were evacuated when a bomb was discovered in Flensburg. Construction workers were excavating nearby when they found the 250-kilogram (550 lb) device.
- May 2021: Around 25,000 people were evacuated in Frankfurt after the discovery of a 500-kilogram (1,100 lb) unexploded bomb.
- October 2021: 2,000 people evacuated in Munich after the discovery of a 75-kilogram (165 lb) unexploded aerial bomb.
- December 2021: Four people were injured during the construction of Trunk Line 2 after a 250-kilogram (550 lb) bomb exploded in Munich.
- December 2021: 15,000 people were evacuated in Berlin after the discovery of a 250-kilogram (550 lb) unexploded aerial bomb.
- August 2022: 12,000 people were evacuated in Berlin after the discovery of a 500-kilogram (1,100 lb) unexploded bomb in Friedrichshain.
- September 2022: A 500-kilogram (1,100 lb) unexploded bomb was found during construction at a community garden southeast of Berlin's A115 autobahn.
- March 2023: A 500-kilogram (1,100 lb) unexploded bomb was found during construction in Berlin’s Zehlendorf district.
- June 2023: A 500-kilogram (1,100 lb) unexploded aerial bomb was found during sewer maintenance works in Northern Darmstadt, prompting evacuations of the area.
- April 2024: A 500-kilogram (1,100 lb) unexploded American-made World War II arial bomb was found near Mewa Arena during construction work in Mainz, prompting evacuations of 3,500 residents from the area.
- June 2024: A 250 kg (550 lb) unexploded World War II bomb was found at Tesla, Inc.'s factory site in Grünheide.
- July 2024: A second 250 kg (550 lb) bomb was found and detonated on the grounds of Tesla’s Gigafactory Berlin-Brandenburg.
- January 2025: An unexploded 250 kg (550 lb) bomb, identified as a British aerial bomb, was found during demolition work on the Carola Bridge in Dresden.
- June 2025: About 20,000 people were evacuated in a radius of about 1km from three unexploded bombs discovered during construction at the Cologne Deutz ship yard. The evacuation included the closure of three bridges across the Rhine, the Cologne Deutz railway station, multiple subway and tram lines and the river Rhine for shipping.
- September 2025: Around 10,000 people are ordered to evacuate after authorities discover two World War II-era unexploded ordnances in Berlin: one in the Spree River near Mitte and another 100-kilogram bomb in Spandau.
- November 2025: Around 21,000 people are ordered to evacuate after an unexploded ordnance weighing around 450 kilograms was found at a construction site in Nuremberg
- November 2025: A 250-kilogram (550 lb) unexploded British aerial bomb with a chemical long-term fuse was found in Troisdorf and had to be detonated. Around 4,800 people were evacuated from a 500-meter radius.
- January 2026: A 250-kilogram (550 lb) unexploded bomb was discovered in central Aachen, leading to the evacuation of about 6,200 people and the temporary closure of the main railway station during defusal operations. Another was found in Wedel during the month, affecting six thousand households.
- March 2026: A 450-kilogram (990 lb) U.S. bomb discovered at a construction site in Nuremberg.
- March 2026: Around 18,000 people were evacuated after a 550-pound (250 kg) unexploded British World War II bomb was discovered during construction work in Dresden. In Kiel, five thousand were evacuated because a 250-kilogram (550 lb) explosive was embedded three metres into the ground near a residential area by Kiel University.
- May 2026: A 1.35ton bomb was found in Pforzheim during construction. 30,000 people were evacuated from a 1500 meter radius encompassing much of the downtown.
- August 2026: A 500-kilogram (1,100 lb) bomb was found lying in a field between Flüggendorf and Oppendorf in Schönkirchen, forcing several roads and a hiking trail to be closed. 240 residents were allowed to return home once the bomb was defused.
- September 2026: A 500-kilogram (1,100 lb) American bomb in the Dietrichsdorf district of Kiel led to 5,235 people being ordered to evacuate.

== Great Britain ==
- 1 October 1969: A German parachute mine was defused by a team led by Major George R. Fletcher MBE, Royal Engineers. at Burghley Road, Camden.
- 5 March 2010: A 100-pound (45 kg) unexploded German bomb was found in Southampton and was blown up in a controlled explosion by the Royal Navy.
- 11 August 2015: A 550-pound (250 kg) German bomb was found and defused by British Army experts in East London.
- 12 May 2016: 1,100 properties were advised to evacuate and three primary schools were closed after a 500-pound (230 kg) German bomb was found under a school playground in Bath, with the bomb being safely deactivated the following day.
- 2 March 2017: A 500-pound (230 kg) German bomb was found and defused by a British Army disposal team in Brent, north-west London.
- 16 May 2017: A 550-pound (250 kg) German bomb was found at Aston Expressway, near Birmingham, and destroyed by British Army experts with a controlled explosion. Hundreds of homes were evacuated and businesses were closed, and London Midland rail services suspended. Two buildings were damaged by the blast.
- 29 November 2017: A 2,200-pound (1,000 kg) German ‘G’ parachute mine was discovered offshore at Falmouth and was detonated safely.
- 14 February 2018: A 500-pound (230 kg) German bomb, found during works in King George V Dock, near London City Airport, was removed from the area and detonated at sea off Shoeburyness, Essex, by British Army experts.
- 24 May 2019: 1,500 houses were evacuated at Kingston upon Thames after a German bomb was found and defused by a controlled explosion by a disposal team. The blast shattered windows along Fasset Road.
- 3 February 2020: A number of streets were evacuated in Central London when a 1,100-pound (500 kg) A World War II bomb was found in the district of Soho.
- 1 December 2020: Royal Navy experts were called after the discovery of a World War II German submarine-laid, moored influence, mine in the River Clyde, Scotland, which contained 770 pounds (350 kg) of explosives and a controlled explosion to dispose of the mine was carried out.
- 15 December 2020: A 42-foot trawler, the Galwad-Y-Mor, was utterly damaged and disabled by the explosion of what could be, according to the experts, WWII allied discarded ordnance off Cromer, Norfolk. The wheelhouse was completely wrecked by the shock wave, and the captain and the rest of the seven men crew, two Britons and five Latvians, were injured, some of them suffering "life-changing" wounds. The trawler, low in the water but still afloat, was towed by the tug GPS Avenger to Grimsby where she was laid up to assess damage; the crew had been already rescued by the offshore support vessel Esvagt Njord.
- 26 February 2021: 2,600 households and the University of Exeter halls of residence were evacuated after the discovery of an unexploded 2,200-pound (1,000 kg) World War II German bomb in Exeter and a controlled detonation was carried out. Despite precautions, houses within 100m were damaged, a large crater was formed, and debris was thrown 250m away.
- 22 July 2021: Eight homes were evacuated and a section of the M62 motorway was closed after the discovery of a 500-pound (230 kg) World War II bomb on a new housing development in Goole.
- 3 December 2021: Train services were delayed after the discovery of an unexploded World War II bomb in Netley, Hampshire at a construction site near a railway track.
- 8 June 2022: After a suspected wartime bomb is found in a lake in Mossley Hill in Liverpool, a planned detonation is successfully carried out.
- 26 January 2023: A planned detonation of a wartime bomb found on a beach in Essex occurs.
- 10 February 2023: A World War II bomb exploded in Great Yarmouth during attempts to defuse it. Minor damage and no injuries were reported.
- 30 April 2026: More than 1,000 homes were evacuated in Plymouth, England, following the discovery of an unexploded World War II-era German SC250 bomb on a building site.
- 22nd September 2026: At Falmouth Docks, Cornwall, a 250lb American air-dropped World War II bomb was removed, with 339 homes evacuated, HM Coastguard telling boat users to stay away from the area, and the Great Western Railway suspending services between Falmouth Town and Falmouth Docks.

== Italy ==
- October 2016: 1,300 people were evacuated in Rovereto after the discovery of a 500-pound (230 kg) American bomb; less than one year earlier, a 1,000-pound (450 kg) bomb was found in the same town.
- March 2018: 23,000 people were evacuated in Fano after a British-made bomb was discovered.
- July 2018: 12,000 were forced from their homes after a 250-kilogram (550 lb) bomb was discovered in Terni.
- October 2019: 4,000 people were evacuated and a nearby highway was closed after a discovery of a World War II bomb in Bolzano, which was removed and blown up in controlled explosion.
- December 2019: 10,000 people were evacuated in Turin upon the discovery of a 65-kilogram (143 lb) British bomb; Mayor Chiara Appendino reported that the device was defused by the Italian Army.
- December 2019: 54,000 people were evacuated in Brindisi from a radius of 1 mile (1.6 km) after the discovery of a World War II bomb.
- November 2020: The Italian army was called to AS Roma training ground after the discovery of as many as 20 devices were found underneath the turf during work to build new pitches at their training complex.
- August 2022: During the 2022 European heat waves, a dried-up river bank of the River Po revealed an unexploded World War II bomb. The bomb was subsequently disposed of through a planned detonation.
- January 2026: 6,100 people were evacuated in Rovereto for the defusing of a 495-kilogram (1000 lb) bomb; Trains passing through the area were cancelled for the time of its defusing. The hospital remained open even to its proximity (400 m) to the location.

== Poland ==
- October 2020: Around 750 people were evacuated in the port city of Świnoujście after the largest ever unexploded World War II bomb in Poland, a Tallboy bomb, was discovered in the Baltic Sea shipping canal, with the bomb detonating during the defusing process.

== Slovakia ==
- September 2025: 225-kilogram (500 lb) bomb was found in Brastislava during construction work. Public transportation and traffic were halted temporarily.

== Slovenia ==
Areas with highest concentrations of unexploded ordinances from second world war are in Žužemberk and in Tezno, Maribor because of the former airplane motor factory. According to research by the Geodetic Institute of Slovenia and colleagues using aerial photography done in 2024, there are still at least 30 unexploded bombs from the Second World War in the Maribor area.

- July 1992: The last German 500 kg bomb in Novo Mesto was found 2 meters deep on a groundworks construction site. Bomb was removed and later detonated in Cerov Log.
- 30 June 2005: A 500 kg bomb was found in Vodole, Maribor. Bomb was relocated and detonated on same day, Slovenian Police evacuated nearest two houses.
- 10 May 2008: A 100 kg bomb was found in Nova Gorica.
- 14 July 2011: A 250 kg bomb was found on construction site in Dravograd. The bomb was disarmed on same day and disposed day after.
- 3 October 2011: A 250 kg bomb was found on same construction site in Dravograd. Bomb was disposed of on 4 October.
- 17 August 2013: Three German 50 kg bombs were found in Češča Vas.
- June 2014: A 250 kg bomb was found on tug Maone in Gulf of Piran. It was lifted on 3 March 2015 as bad weather prevented bomb's relocation.
- 17 August 2014: A 250 kg bomb was found in Maribor.
- 13 February 2015: Three 250 kg American bombs were found in Drava river in Maribor. The bombs were not dangerous and were stored till disposal.
- 19 July 2017: A 41-year-old man found a 227 kg American bomb in the surroundings of Vurberk and brought it home. The bomb was neutralised on 25 July, two controlled explosions were carried out. Intervention was regarded as one of the hardest in Slovenian history. 400 people were evacuated in radius of 1 km.
- 17 April 2018: A 285 kg bomb was found in Nova Gorica and stored till disposal.
- 17 April 2018: A British incendiary bomb of unknown mass was found in Rošpoh, Maribor and detonated.
- 26 October 2019: A 250 kg was found in Maribor and detonated on 31 October.
- 27 October 2019: An aerial bomb of unknown mass was found while a railway was undergoing reconstruction in Maribor.
- 3 November 2019: A 500 kg bomb was deactivated in Maribor. There's still about 200 bombs left in Maribor.
- 11 January 2022: A 250 kg was found in Maribor and defused on 16 January.
- 14 May 2022: A 200 kg bomb was found in the vicinity of Pragersko railway station and stored till disposal.
- 17 July 2023: A 250 kg aerial bomb was found in Nova Gorica while groundworks for railway. 100 meter parameter was declared, evacuation and bomb deactivation is planned for Sunday 23 July. Evacuation was led in cooperation with Italian officials as bomb was found near the border.
- 26 February 2024: A 250 kg aerial bomb of American origin was found on Nova Gorica Railway Station. Another bomb of same type was found on February 29 about 50 m apart. Disposal took place on 10 March 2024, evacuation led by Slovenian and Italian authorities.
- 25 August 2024: A 226 kg MC 500 lb bomb was found on Nova Gorica Railway station and was deactivated. Evacuation was done in cooperation with Italian authorities.

== See also ==
- Unexploded ordnance
