= Design code (United Kingdom) =

A design code is a document that sets rules for the design of a new development in the United Kingdom. It is a tool that can be used in the design and planning process, but goes further and is more regulatory than other forms of guidance commonly used in the English planning system over recent decades. It can be thought of as a process and document – and therefore a mechanism – which operationalises design guidelines or standards which have been established through a masterplan process. The masterplan or design framework is the vision. It should be accompanied by a design rationale that explains the objectives, with the design code providing instructions to the appropriate degree of precision for the more detailed design work.

In this way a design code may be a tool which helps ensure that the aspirations for quality and quantity for housing developments, particularly for large-scale projects, sought by the Government and other agencies are actually realised in the final schemes. It has the potential to deliver the consistency in quality exposed as lacking by CABE’s Housing Audit (2004).

Examples of developments where design codes are being used include:

- Poundbury, Dorchester
- Fairford Leys, Aylesbury
- Fairfield, Bedfordshire
- Ashford Barracks, Ashford
- Upton, Northampton

== See also ==
- Building code
