= Perthshire South and Kinross-shire =

Constituency of the Scottish Parliament

- County constituency for the Scottish Parliament
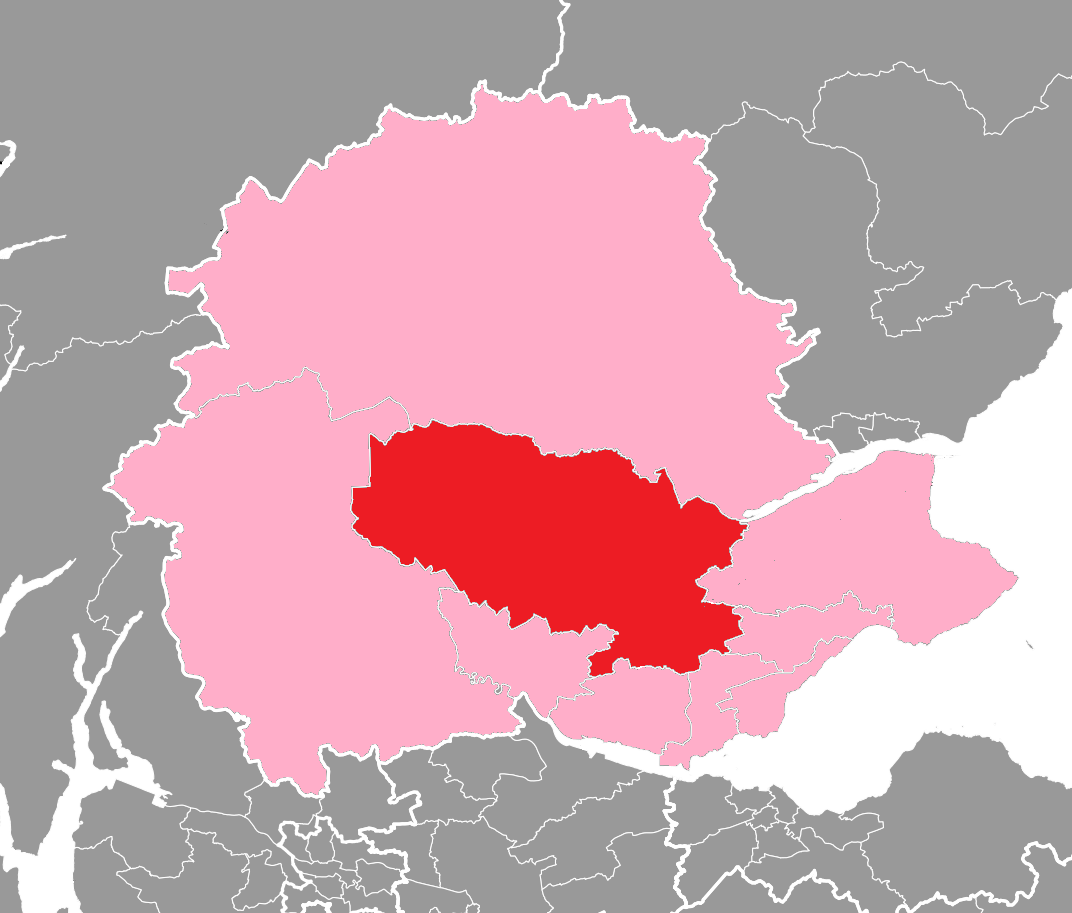

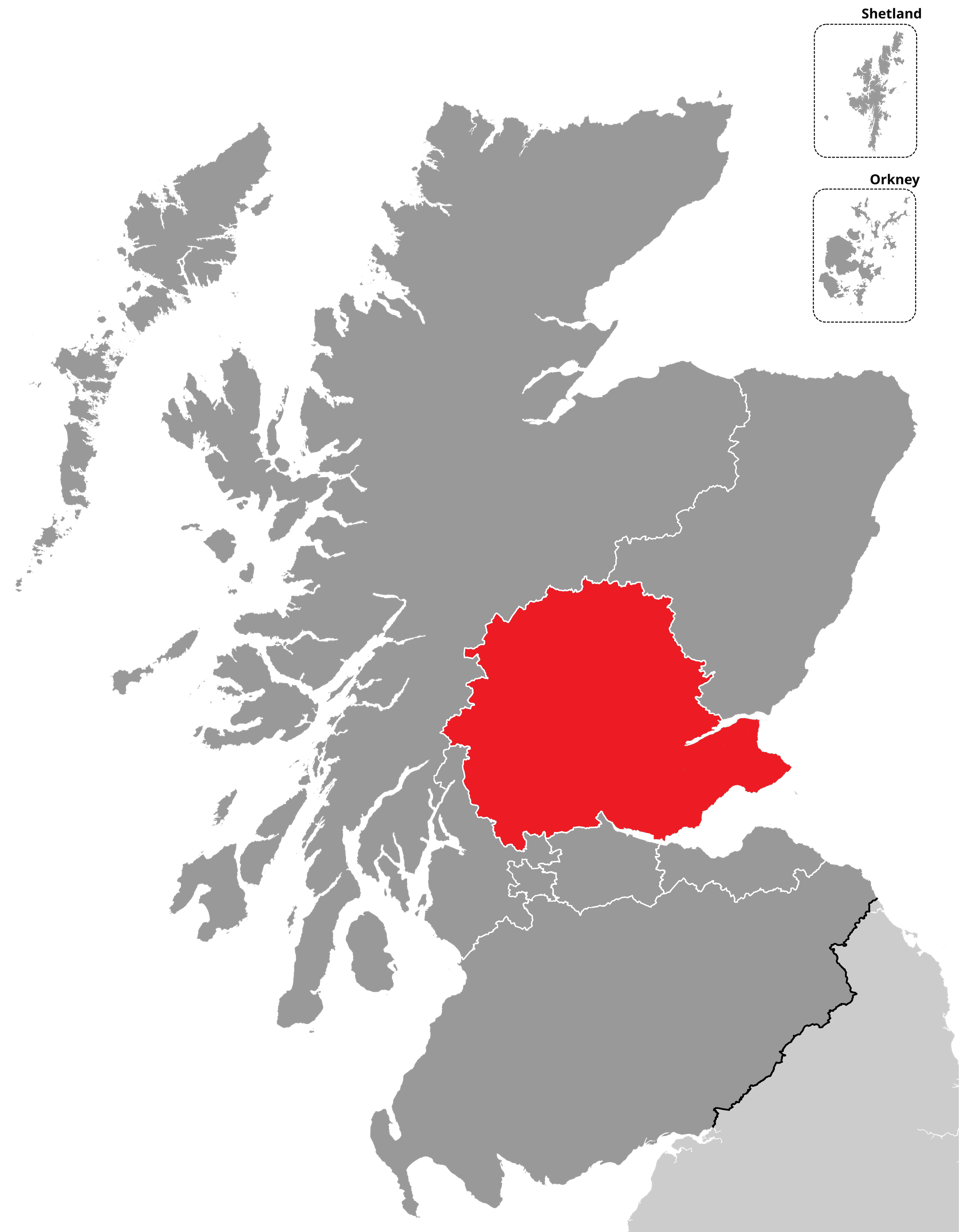
- Perthshire South and Kinross-shire shown within the Mid Scotland and Fife electoral region and the region shown within Scotland
- Electoral region: Mid Scotland and Fife
- Electorate: 61,800 (2026)

Current constituency
- Created: 2011
- Party: Scottish National Party
- MSP: Jim Fairlie
- Council area: Perth and Kinross
- Created from: Ochil, Perth

Perthshire South and Kinross-shire is a county constituency of the Scottish Parliament covering part of the council area of Perth and Kinross. Under the additional-member electoral system used for elections to the Scottish Parliament, it elects one Member of the Scottish Parliament (MSP) by the plurality (first past the post) method of election. It is also one of nine constituencies in the Mid Scotland and Fife electoral region, which elects seven additional members, in addition to the nine constituency MSPs, to produce a form of proportional representation for the region as a whole.

The seat has been held by Jim Fairlie of the Scottish National Party since the 2021 Scottish Parliament election.

== Electoral region ==
The other eight constituencies of the Mid Scotland and Fife region are: Clackmannanshire and Dunblane, Cowdenbeath, Dunfermline, Fife North East, Kirkcaldy, Mid Fife and Glenrothes, Perthshire North and Stirling. The region covers all of the Clackmannanshire council area, all of the Fife council area, all of the Perth and Kinross council area and all of the Stirling council area.

== Constituency boundaries and council area ==
Map of boundaries from 2011

The Perth and Kinross council area is represented in the Scottish Parliament by two constituencies, Perthshire North and Perthshire South and Kinross-shire, defined by the 2011 first periodic review of Scottish Parliament boundaries. Prior to this, Perth and Kinross was represented by four constituencies in the Scottish Parliament, which were used from the opening of the Parliament in 1999 until the 2011 Scottish Parliament election, these were: Angus, North Tayside, Perth and Ochil.

The electoral wards of Perth and Kinross Council used in the formation of Perthshire South and Kinross-shire are:

- Strathearn
- Strathallan
- Kinross-shire
- Almond and Earn
- Perth City South
- Perth City North

At the second periodic review of Scottish Parliament boundaries in 2025 the seat boundaries were amended very slightly to reflect changes in the boundaries of the above wards, although the seat continues to be formed of the same wards as at the first periodic review.

== Constituency profile ==
The BBC provided the following profile of the constituency ahead of the 2016 Scottish Parliament election:

This is a relatively prosperous, largely rural, lowland constituency on the fringe of the Highlands with successful livestock and fruit-growing sectors reliant on its good soil quality. The beautiful scenery also attracts tourism, and the constituency as a whole enjoys relatively low unemployment. A sizeable amount of the electorate lives in the city of Perth while other towns in the constituency include Auchterarder, Crieff, and Bridge of Earn. Kinross was added to the constituency in the border review of 2011. The Tories held Perth's predecessor seats at Westminster for most of the post-war period. But in the 1995 by-election, the SNP's Roseanna Cunningham won through and retained the seat at the 1997 General Election. She went on to be elected to Holyrood when the Scottish Parliament was formed in 1999, and was returned in 2003, 2007 and again in 2011.

The Perthshire South and Kinross-shire constituency covers the southern half of the Perth and Kinross council area, forming its northern boundaries with the Perthshire North constituency following the River Almond and the River Tay east of Perth. The seat covers a majority of the city of Perth to the north-east, covering the western side of the city from Dunkeld Road and the railway line.

== Member of the Scottish Parliament ==
Election	Member	Party
2011	Roseanna Cunningham	Scottish National Party
2021	Jim Fairlie	Scottish National Party

== Election results ==
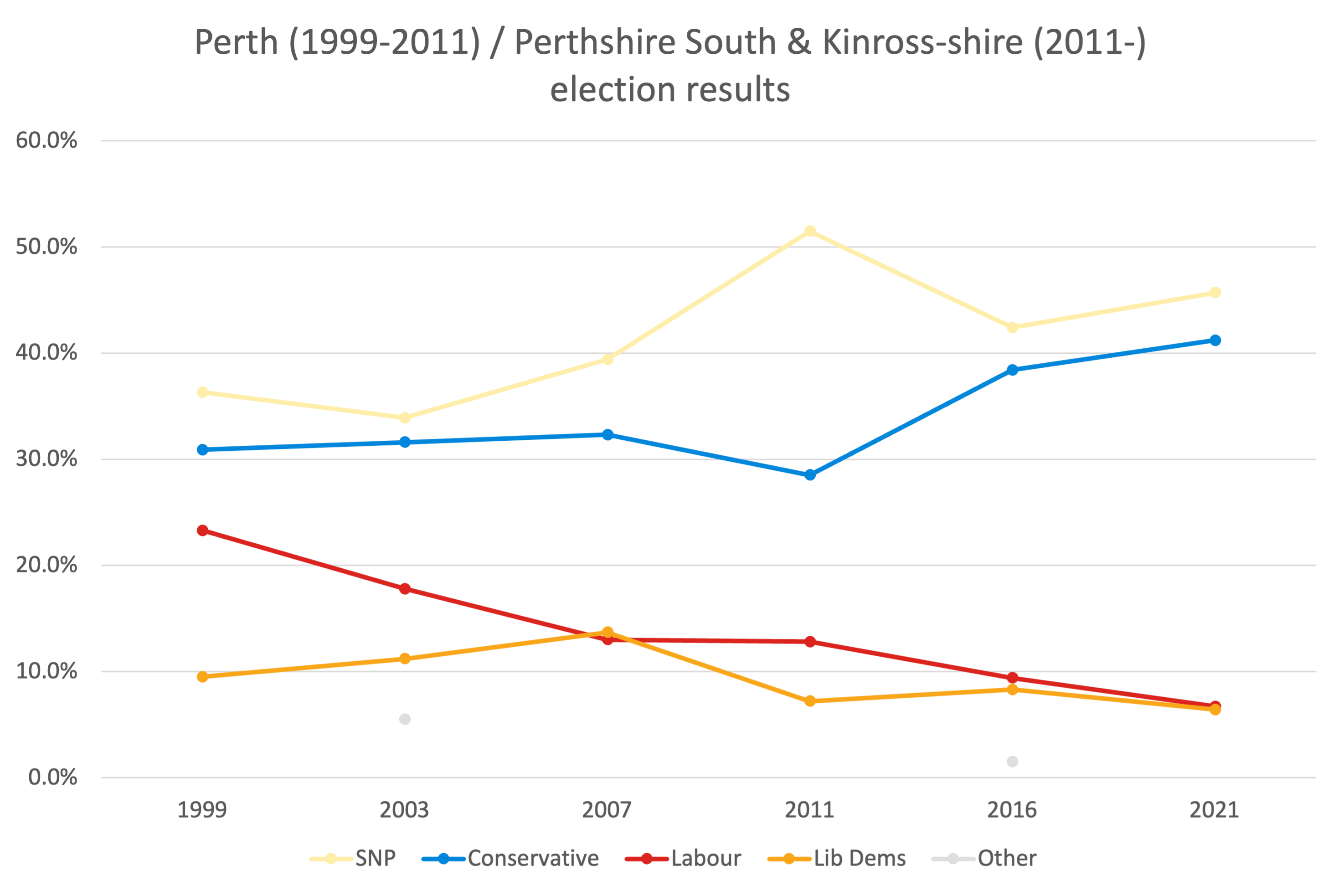
Perthshire South & Kinross-shire election results 1999-2021

=== 2020s ===
2026 Scottish Parliament election: Perthshire South and Kinross-shire
Party	Candidate	Constituency			Regional		
Party	Candidate	Votes	%	±%	Votes	%	±%
SNP	Jim Fairlie (Note: Incumbent member for this constituency)	14,707	40.4	▼4.9	10,069	27.6	▼8.8
Conservative	Roz McCall (Note: Incumbent member on the party list, or for another constituency)	9,646	26.5	▼15.1	8,331	22.9	▼14.0
Reform	Helen McDade (Note: Elected on the party list)	5,128	14.1	New	5,648	15.5	▲15.2
Liberal Democrats	Amanda Clark	4,329	11.9	▲5.5	4,026	11.0	▲4.9
Green					4,249	11.7	▲3.1
Labour	Luke Thomson	2,599	7.1	▲0.3	2,928	8.0	▼0.1
Independent Green Voice					326	0.9	New
AtLS					283	0.8	New
Scottish Family					230	0.6	▲0.1
ISP					187	0.5	New
Scottish Socialist					80	0.2	New
Scottish Libertarian					48	0.1	Steady
Advance UK					38	0.1	New
Majority		5,061	13.9	▲9.4			
Valid votes		36,409			36,453		
Invalid votes		146			97		
Turnout		36,555	59.2	▼10.6	36,550	59.1	▼10.8
SNP hold		Swing					
Notes

2021 Scottish Parliament election: Perthshire South and Kinross-shire
Party	Candidate	Constituency			Regional		
Party	Candidate	Votes	%	±%	Votes	%	±%
SNP	Jim Fairlie	20,126	45.7	▲3.3	16,074	36.4	▼1.3
Conservative	Liz Smith (Note: Incumbent member on the party list, or for another constituency)	18,178	41.2	▲2.8	16,317	36.9	▼1.6
Green					3,814	8.6	▲2.3
Labour	Janine Rennie	2,943	6.7	▼2.7	3,575	8.1	▼1.3
Liberal Democrats	Julia Brown	2,823	6.4	▼1.9	2,694	6.1	▲0.7
Alba					669	1.5	New
All for Unity					310	0.7	New
Scottish Family					225	0.5	New
Reform					142	0.3	New
Abolish the Scottish Parliament					121	0.3	New
Freedom Alliance (UK)					98	0.2	New
Scottish Libertarian					53	0.1	▼0.1
UKIP					50	0.1	▼1.7
Independent	Martin Keatings				18	0.0	New
Renew					13	0.0	New
Independent	Mercy Kamanja				8	0.0	New
Majority		1,948	4.5	▲0.6			
Valid votes		44,070			44,181		
Invalid votes		147			84		
Turnout		44,217	69.8	▲8.7	44,265	69.9	▲8.8
SNP hold		Swing					

=== 2010s ===
2016 Scottish Parliament election: Perthshire South and Kinross-shire
Party	Candidate	Constituency			Regional		
Party	Candidate	Votes	%	±%	Votes	%	±%
SNP	Roseanna Cunningham (Note: Incumbent member for this constituency)	15,315	42.4	▼9.1	13,668	37.7	▼10.0
Conservative	Liz Smith (Note: Incumbent member on the party list, or for another constituency)	13,893	38.4	▲9.9	13,966	38.5	▲13.4
Labour	Scott Nicholson	3,389	9.4	▼3.3	3,429	9.4	▼3.1
Liberal Democrats	Willie Robertson	3,008	8.3	▲1.1	1,949	5.4	▲0.5
Green					2,264	6.3	▲1.5
UKIP					635	1.8	▲0.7
Independent politician	Craig Finlay	544	1.5	New			
RISE					123	0.3	New
Solidarity					95	0.3	▲0.3
Scottish Libertarian					70	0.2	New
Majority		1,422	3.9	▼19.1			
Valid votes		36,149			36,271		
Invalid votes		112			72		
Turnout		36,261	61.1	▲7.2	36,271	61.1	▲7.2
SNP hold		Swing					
Notes

2011 Scottish Parliament election: Perthshire South and Kinross-shire (Note: Percentage change in constituency shown relative to notional result)
Party	Candidate	Constituency			Region		
Party	Candidate	Votes	%	±%	Votes	%	±%
SNP	Roseanna Cunningham (Note: Incumbent member for the Perth constituency)	16,073	51.49	▲14.6	14,957	47.73	N/A
Conservative	Liz Smith (Note: Incumbent member on the party list, or for another constituency)	8,907	28.53	▼3.9	7,865	25.10	N/A
Labour	Patricia Duncan	3,980	12.75	▲0.2	3,907	12.47	N/A
Liberal Democrats	Willie Robertson	2,256	7.23	▼9.6	1,527	4.87	N/A
Green					1,512	4.82	N/A
Scottish Senior Citizens					522	1.67	N/A
UKIP					349	1.11	N/A
BNP					183	0.58	N/A
Scottish Christian					107	0.34	N/A
Socialist Labour					104	0.33	N/A
Scottish Socialist					86	0.27	N/A
CPA					75	0.24	N/A
Independent	Andrew Roger				55	0.18	N/A
Solidarity					14	0.04	N/A
Majority		7,166	23.0	N/A			
Valid votes		31,216			31,263		
Invalid votes		90			75		
Turnout		31,603	53.9	N/A	31,338	53.9	N/A
SNP win (new seat)							

=== 2000s: Notional result ===
The following is the notional result for the 2007 Scottish Parliament election, as calculated by the BBC.

Scottish Parliament election, 2007 Notional Result: Perthshire South and Kinross-shire
Party	Candidate	Votes	%	±%
SNP	N/A	11,431	36.9	N/A
Conservative	N/A	10,047	32.4	N/A
Liberal Democrats	N/A	5,211	16.8	N/A
Labour	N/A	3,906	12.6	N/A
Others	N/A	420	1.4	N/A
Majority		1,384	4.5	N/A
SNP hold		Swing	N/A	

== Footnotes ==
=== Bibliography ===
- "Second Review of Scottish Parliament Boundaries: Report to Scottish Ministers" (PDF). Boundaries Scotland. April 2025.

== See also ==
- Perth and Kinross-shire (UK Parliament constituency)
