= LGLS =

LGLS may refer to:

- Lothian Gay and Lesbian Switchboard, gay helpline and charity
- LG Life Sciences, a division of LG
- Station code of Laki Ghulam Shah Halt railway station in Pakistan
