= Kenneth Cowan =

Kenneth Cowan may refer to:

- Sir Kenneth Cowan, Chief Medical Officer for Scotland, see Chief Medical Officer (United Kingdom)
- Ken Cowan, Canadian organist
- Ken Cowan (activist), Scottish AIDS activist
