= Iona McGregor =

Scottish LGBT author

- Born: 1929; Aldershot, Hampshire
- Died: 14 March 2021 (aged 91–92); Edinburgh Royal Infirmary
- Education: Morrison’s Academy for Girls, Crieff Bury Convent High School Monmouth School for Girls
- Alma mater: University of Bristol
- Occupation: Author
- Relatives: Ailsa Allaby (sister), Masry Prince (sister)
- Writing career
- Language: English

Iona McGregor (1929 – 14 March 2021) was a Scottish author and teacher best known for her written work and her contributions to gay rights activism, especially from the 1970's onwards. She worked with the Scottish Minorities Group in Glasgow (and later in Edinburgh) to help create safe social spaces for women, and to develop the Edinburgh Befriending Service for people who were members of the LGBT community (which later became the Lothian Gay and Lesbian Switchboard). In later life, she was an active member of Edinburgh U3A. She was a full time teacher, and so had to keep her activism work and personal life a secret in order to avoid losing her job. She was a member of the Scottish PEN and wrote novels and non-fiction, especially about Scottish history.

After she retired from teaching, she began to write about topics that she had not been able to previously, due to their taboo nature; such as her 1989 novel Death Wore A Diadem, a mystery novel which features lesbian romance.

== Early life ==
McGregor was born in Aldershot, Hampshire, to parents Clarice Mary (nee Watkins) and Michael Joseph McGregor (a teacher in the Army Educational Corps). She was the eldest of three sisters (siblings Masry Prince (deceased) and Ailsa Allaby), and grew up in Perthshire, Scotland. Her early education took place at Morrison’s Academy for Girls in Crieff. She moved with her family to Manchester in 1940, where she then attended Bury Convent High School. She later received a scholarship to board at Monmouth School for Girls, and went on to study Classics at the University of Bristol. She was raised as a Catholic, but had no religion as an adult. As a child, she struggled with her gender identity, and did not feel like she wanted to accept "the feminine role". She was reported to have argued with nuns about Darwin whilst she was attending Bury Convent High School.

== Career ==
She was an author and teacher by occupation, and wrote a number of novels and non-fiction books. She particularly liked to write about Scottish history. As a young woman, she lived in Edinburgh, but later decided to move to London as a means to meet fellow gay women and perhaps find a partner. It was in London that she began working as a grammar school teacher. She was aware that she had to be very careful about revealing any details of her personal life, as her sexuality was deemed unacceptable at the time, meaning that she could have easily lost her job if people became aware of it. During this period, she began to write young adult fiction, influenced by Rosemary Sutcliff. The novels that she wrote at this time contained no queer content, as her publisher specified that this would not be allowed. Two of her novels that she regarded as her best work were set in Edinburgh (An Edinburgh Reel and The Tree of Liberty). She stopped teaching in 1985, and began to write more freely as a result. The first novel she wrote after finishing teaching was Death Wore a Diadem (1989), a historical novel featuring mystery and lesbian romance, and set in 1860. As time went on, McGregor shifted more toward writing study guides, as they paid considerably more than her detective novels. She later took up teaching again with the University of the Third Age, and helped to found the AD Group; a group that had two names for different occasions (Aged Dykes/Anno Domini).

== Personal life ==
McGregor had a partner for 12 years, with whom she moved to Edinburgh. A few years after they moved to Edinburgh, her partner left, largely influenced by family pressures and finding it very difficult to live such a secretive life.

== Bibliography ==
- Iona McGregor (1969). Popinjay. Faber & Faber. ISBN 978-0-571-08837-9.
- Iona McGregor (1970). Burning Hill. Faber & Faber. ISBN 978-0-571-09318-2.
- Iona McGregor (1972). The Tree of Liberty. Faber & Faber. ISBN 978-0-571-10121-4.
- Iona McGregor (1975). An Edinburgh Reel. Puffin Books. ISBN 978-0-14-030766-5.
- Iona McGregor (1979). The Snake and the Olive. Puffin Books. ISBN 978-0-14-031088-7.
- Iona McGregor (1979). Edinburgh And The Eastern Lowlands: Lothian, Fife, And The Borders. Faber & Faber. ISBN 978-0-571-11100-8.
- Iona McGregor (1987). Oscar Wilde's "Importance Of Being Earnest" (Passnotes). Penguin. ISBN 978-0-14-077066-7.
- Iona McGregor (1989). Death Wore A Diadem. St. Martin's Press. ISBN 978-0-312-03812-0.
- Iona McGregor, Dorothy I. Kidd (1994). Bairns - Scottish Children in Photos. National Museums of Scotland. ISBN 978-0-948636-65-3.
- Iona McGregor (1998). "Animal Farm" (Teach Yourself Revision Guides). Teach Yourself. ISBN 978-0-340-66401-8.
- Iona McGregor (1998). "Portrait of the Artist as a Young Man" (Teach Yourself Revision Guides). Teach Yourself. ISBN 978-0-340-67960-9.
- Iona McGregor (1999). The "Crucible" (Teach Yourself Revision Guides). Teach Yourself. ISBN 978-0-340-74762-9.
- Iona McGregor (2004). Getting Married in Scotland. National Museums of Scotland. ISBN 978-1-901663-29-7.

== See also ==
- Scottish Minorities Group
