= Perth (Scottish Parliament constituency) =

Scottish Parliament constituency

- Former county constituency for the Scottish Parliament
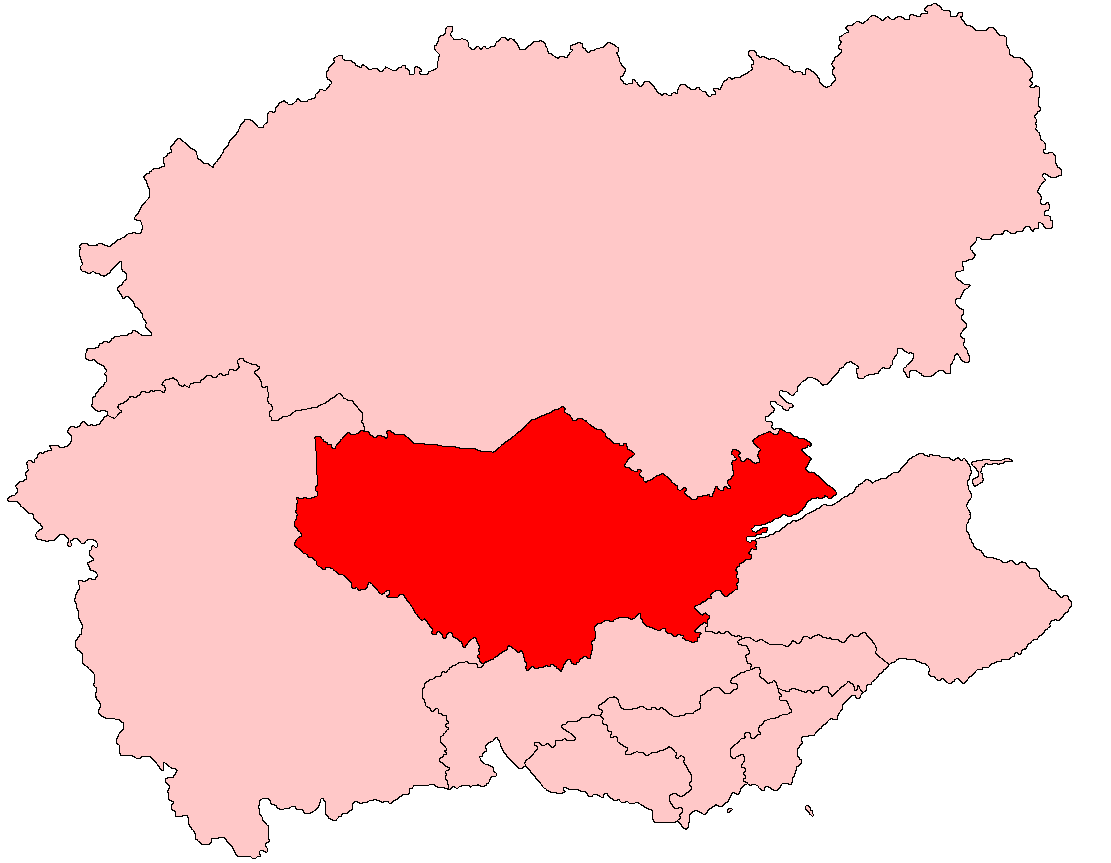

- Perth shown within the Mid Scotland and Fife electoral region and the region shown within Scotland

Former constituency
- Created: 1999
- Abolished: 2011
- Council area: Perth and Kinross
- Replaced by: Perthshire North; Perthshire South and Kinross-shire

Perth was a constituency of the Scottish Parliament, Under the additional-member electoral system used for elections to the Scottish Parliament, it elected one Member of the Scottish Parliament (MSP) by the plurality (first past the post) method of election. It was also one of nine constituencies in the Mid Scotland and Fife electoral region, which elected seven additional members, in addition to the nine constituency MSPs, to produce a form of proportional representation for the region as a whole.

For the 2011 Scottish Parliament election the constituency of Perth was abolished and replaced by Perthshire North and Perthshire South and Kinross-shire.

== Electoral region ==
Up to 2011, the other eight constituencies of the Mid Scotland and Fife region were: Dunfermline East, Dunfermline West, Fife Central, Fife North East, Kirkcaldy, Ochil, Stirling and Tayside North. The region covered all of the Clackmannanshire council area, all of the Fife council area, all of the Perth and Kinross council area, all of the Stirling council area and parts of the Angus council area.

== Constituency boundaries and council area ==
The constituency was created at the same time as the Scottish Parliament, in 1999, with the name and boundaries of a pre-existing Westminster (House of Commons) constituency. The area has been covered by Westminster constituencies with differing names but similar boundaries since 1918, but in 2005 Scottish Westminster constituencies were mostly replaced with new constituencies. Most of the Perth Westminster constituency was merged into Ochil and South Perthshire. Part, including the city of Perth, was merged into Perth and North Perthshire.

The Holyrood constituency of Perth covered a central portion of the Perth and Kinross council area. The rest of the council area was covered by two Mid Scotland and Fife constituencies, Ochil and Tayside North, and one North East Scotland constituency, Angus.

The Ochil constituency, to the south of the Perth constituency, also covered the Clackmannanshire council area and a south-eastern portion of the Stirling council area. Tayside North, to the north of the Perth constituency, also covered a northern portions of the Angus council area. The Angus constituency, to the north-east of the Perth constituency, also covered a southern portion of the Angus council area and north-western and north-eastern portions of the Dundee City council area.

=== Boundary review ===
See Scottish Parliament constituencies and regions from 2011 Following their First Periodic review of constituencies to the Scottish Parliament in time for the 2011 election, the Boundary Commission for Scotland proposed two new seats to replace Perth. These were to be known as Perthshire North and Perthshire South and Kinross-shire.

== Constituency profile ==
The constituency covered a combination of small prosperous towns and rich agricultural land. It included the city of Perth and the towns of Bridge of Earn, Auchterarder, Crieff and Comrie. It was a relatively prosperous, largely rural, Lowland seat on the fringe of the Highlands, with successful livestock farming, fruit-growing and tourism interests. Unemployment is relatively low and half the electorate lived in the city of Perth itself.

At Westminster elections the area was traditionally Conservative, and Conservatives have held seats representing the area during most of the period since World War II. Scottish National Party (SNP) tradition was also strong in the area, however, and the SNP has contested every parliamentary election in the area in the same post war period. In the Perth and Kinross Westminster by-election in 1995, the SNP's Roseanna Cunningham won the Perth and Kinross Westminster seat from the Conservatives with an 11.5% swing. She then held the seat in the 1997 United Kingdom general election and went on to be elected to Holyrood in the 1999 Scottish Parliament election. She represented the Scottish Parliamentary constituency and its equivalent successor constituency until 2021. Before the constituency's abolishment at the British Parliament in 2005, the Perth Westminster constituency became the most marginal constituency in Scotland in 2001, with the SNP's Annabelle Ewing narrowly holding the constituency for the SNP, with the Conservatives missing out by 48 votes.

== Member of the Scottish Parliament ==
Election	Member	Party
1999	Roseanna Cunningham	Scottish National Party
2011	constituency abolished: replaced by Perthshire South and Kinross-shire and Perthshire North	

== Election results ==
2007 Scottish Parliament election: Perth
Party	Candidate	Votes	%	±%
SNP	Roseanna Cunningham	13,751	39.4	+5.5
Conservative	Liz Smith	11,256	32.3	+0.7
Liberal Democrats	Peter Barrett	4,767	13.7	+2.5
Labour	Doug Maughan	4,513	13.0	−4.8
Majority		2,495	7.1	+4.8
Turnout		34,862		
SNP hold		Swing	+4.9	

2003 Scottish Parliament election: Perth
Party	Candidate	Votes	%	±%
SNP	Roseanna Cunningham	10,717	33.9	−2.4
Conservative	Alexander Stewart	9,990	31.6	+0.7
Labour	Rob Ball	5,629	17.8	−5.5
Liberal Democrats	Gordon Campbell	3,530	11.2	+1.7
Scottish Socialist	Philip Stott	982	3.1	New
Independent	Thomas Burns	509	1.6	New
Scottish People's	Kenneth Buchanan	257	0.8	New
Majority		727	2.3	−3.1
Turnout		31,614	51.0	−9.6
SNP hold		Swing	-2.4	

1999 Scottish Parliament election: Perth
Party	Candidate	Votes	%	±%
SNP	Roseanna Cunningham	13,570	36.3	N/A
Conservative	Ian Stevenson	11,543	30.9	N/A
Labour	Jilian Richards	8,725	23.3	N/A
Liberal Democrats	Chic Brodie	3,558	9.5	N/A
Majority		2,027	5.4	N/A
Turnout		37,396	60.6	N/A
SNP win (new seat)				
