= Roseanna Cunningham =

Scottish politician

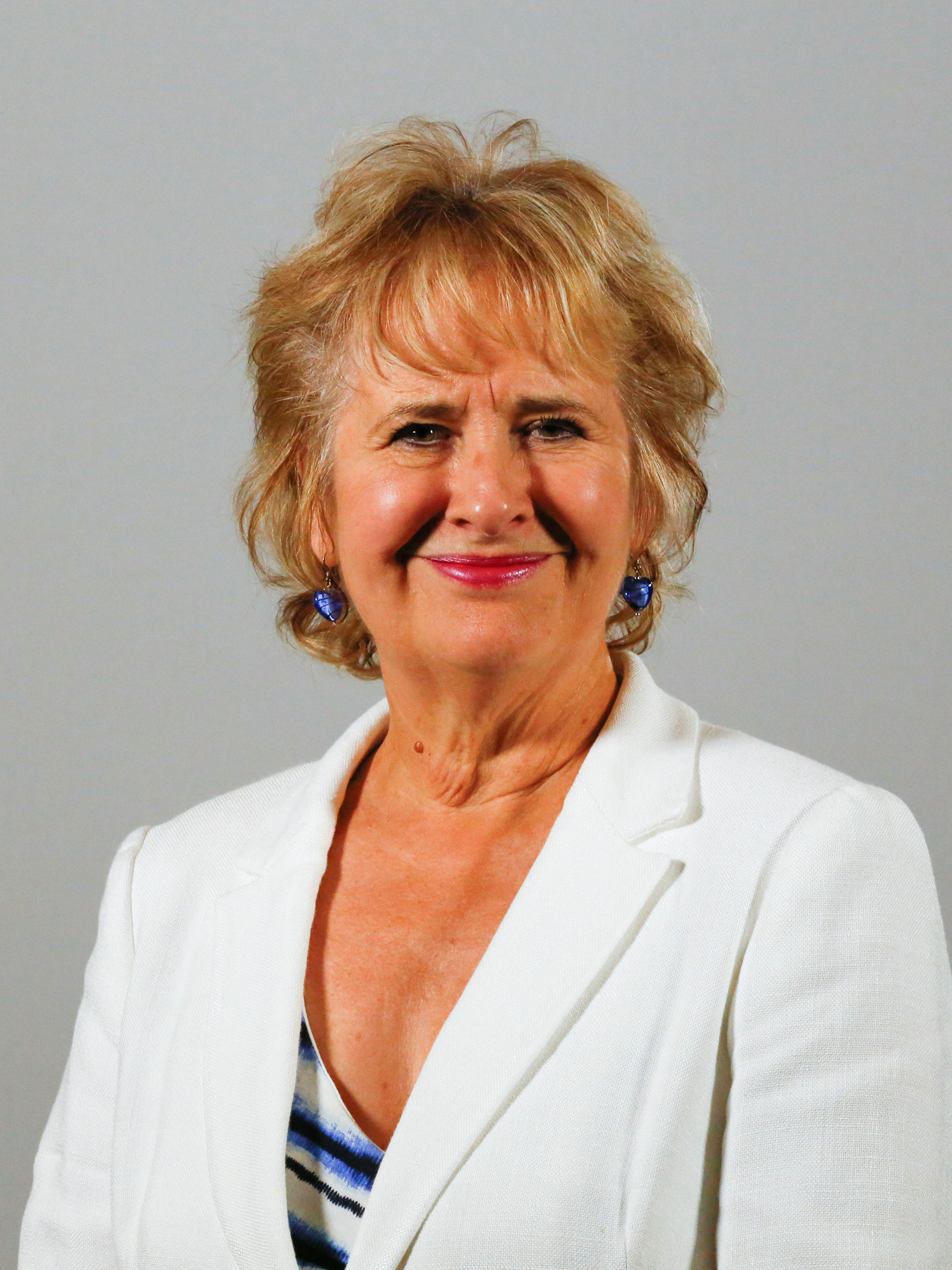
- Cunningham in 2018

Cabinet Secretary for Environment, Climate Change and Land Reform
- In office 18 May 2016 – 19 May 2021
- First Minister: Nicola Sturgeon
- Preceded by: Aileen McLeod
- Succeeded by: Michael Matheson (Net Zero); Mairi Gougeon (Land Reform)
- In office 12 February 2009 – 24 May 2011
- First Minister: Alex Salmond
- Preceded by: Michael Russell
- Succeeded by: Stewart Stevenson

Cabinet Secretary for Fair Work, Skills and Training
- In office 21 November 2014 – 18 May 2016
- First Minister: Nicola Sturgeon
- Preceded by: Angela Constance
- Succeeded by: Keith Brown (Fair Work); John Swinney (Skills)

Minister for Community Safety and Legal Affairs
- In office 25 May 2011 – 21 November 2014
- First Minister: Alex Salmond
- Preceded by: Fergus Ewing
- Succeeded by: Paul Wheelhouse

Depute Leader of the Scottish National Party
- In office 26 September 2000 – 3 September 2004
- Leader: John Swinney
- Preceded by: John Swinney
- Succeeded by: Nicola Sturgeon

Member of the Scottish Parliament for Perthshire South and Kinross-shire Perth (1999–2011)
- In office 6 May 1999 – 5 May 2021
- Preceded by: Constituency established
- Succeeded by: Jim Fairlie

Member of Parliament for Perth Perth and Kinross (1995–1997)
- In office 25 May 1995 – 14 May 2001
- Preceded by: Nicholas Fairbairn
- Succeeded by: Annabelle Ewing

Personal details
- Born: 27 July 1951 (age 75) Glasgow, Scotland
- Party: Scottish National Party
- Education: University of Western Australia; University of Edinburgh; University of Aberdeen
- Profession: Solicitor, advocate

Roseanna Cunningham (born 27 July 1951) is a retired Scottish National Party (SNP) politician who served as Cabinet Secretary for Environment, Climate Change and Land Reform from 2016 to 2021. She was previously Cabinet Secretary for Fair Work, Skills and Training from 2014 until 2016.

From 2000 to 2004, she was Deputy First Minister of Scotland under John Swinney and unsuccessfully ran to replace him in the 2004 Scottish National Party leadership election, after being beaten by Alex Salmond.

She served as the Member of the Scottish Parliament (MSP) for Perth from 1999 to 2011, and then for Perthshire South and Kinross-shire from 2011 to 2021. She was formerly Member of Parliament (MP) for Perth and Kinross from 1995 to 1997, then for Perth from 1997 to 2001.

== Early life, education and legal practice ==
Cunningham was born on 27 July 1951 in Glasgow to Catherine and Hugh Cunningham, and spent her early years living in East Lothian and Edinburgh. In 1960, she emigrated with her family to Perth in Australia, and completed her schooling at John Curtin High School in Fremantle. As a teenager she became interested in politics, and in 1969 joined the SNP as an overseas member. In 1975 Cunningham graduated from the University of Western Australia with a BA Hons in politics. She returned to Scotland in 1976.

She worked as a research assistant at SNP headquarters from 1977 to 1979, and was a member of the left-wing 79 Group inside the SNP during the early 1980s, but avoided expulsion as she was not a member of its steering committee (future SNP leader Alex Salmond by contrast who served on the 79 Group committee was expelled, while Margo MacDonald resigned from the party in protest before she could be expelled).

Cunningham returned to university in 1980, graduating from the University of Edinburgh in 1982 with a Bachelor of Laws degree, followed in 1983 by a Diploma in Legal Practice from the University of Aberdeen. She worked as a solicitor for Dumbarton District Council and Glasgow District Council. After a brief period in private practice, she was admitted to the Faculty of Advocates in 1990.

== Political career ==
At the 1992 general election Cunningham stood in the Perth and Kinross constituency, losing by around 2,000 votes.

In 1995 she gained the seat in the Perth and Kinross by-election, succeeding the recently deceased Conservative MP, Sir Nicholas Fairbairn. She had initially been omitted from the SNP's candidate shortlist over her brief relationship in the 1970s with Donald Bain, the then husband of SNP MP Margaret Ewing, on the grounds that the issue could prove an embarrassment to the party. Cunningham said the affair had begun after Bain and Ewing had separated. She was put back in contention following an intervention by the then party leader Alex Salmond, and after Ewing made clear she had no objection to Cunningham's candidature. In the 1997 election, she stood for the Perth constituency and was elected.

In 1999 she became the MSP for Perth. In 2000, she was elected the SNP Senior Vice-Convener (depute leader). Also in that year, she helped establish the Scottish Left Review publication. She stood down as an MP in 2001, to concentrate on the Scottish Parliament.

John Swinney announced his resignation as leader of the SNP on 22 June 2004, and on the same day, Cunningham announced that she would be a candidate in the subsequent election for the party leadership. In the early stages of the campaign, she appeared to be the clear front-runner, but former leader Alex Salmond entered the race just before nominations closed and Cunningham finished a distant second.

In December 2006, she led an unsuccessful attempt to prevent same-sex couples from gaining the right to adopt children, despite having previously been named ScotsGay Parliamentarian of the Year in 1998. When legislation to introduce same-sex marriage in Scotland was passed by the Scottish Parliament in February 2014, she voted against the bill.

In the first reshuffle of the SNP Government in February 2009, Cunningham was appointed as Minister for the Environment. In December 2010, she also took on portfolio responsibility for climate change, becoming Minister for the Environment and Climate Change. After the 2011 election, which saw an SNP landslide, she was appointed Minister for Community Safety and Legal Affairs with special responsibility for tackling sectarianism.

In Nicola Sturgeon's first reshuffle in November 2014, she was promoted to Cabinet as Cabinet Secretary for Fair Work, Skills and Training.

She announced on 21 August 2020 that she would step down as an MSP in the 2021 Scottish election.

== Later life ==
Since leaving the Scottish Parliament, Cunningham has served as a Commissioner of the Electoral Commission, the independent body that regulates elections and political finance in the United Kingdom.

Parliament of the United Kingdom
Preceded by Nicholas Fairbairn	Member of Parliament for Perth and Kinross; 1995–1997	Constituency abolished
New constituency	Member of Parliament for Perth; 1997–2001	Succeeded by Annabelle Ewing
Scottish Parliament
New constituency	Member of the Scottish Parliament for Perth; 1999–2011	Constituency abolished
New constituency	Member of the Scottish Parliament for Perthshire South and Kinross-shire; 2011–2021	Succeeded by Jim Fairlie
Political offices
Preceded by Michael Russell	Minister for Environment and Climate Change; 2009–2011	Succeeded by Stewart Stevenson
Preceded by Fergus Ewing as Minister for Community Safety	Minister for Community Safety and Legal Affairs; 2011–2014	Succeeded by Paul Wheelhouse
Preceded by Angela Constance as Cabinet Secretary for Training, Youth and Women's Employment	Cabinet Secretary for Fair Work, Skills and Training; 2014–2016	Succeeded by Keith Brown (Fair Work); John Swinney (Skills)
Preceded by Aileen McLeod	Cabinet Secretary for Environment, Climate Change and Land Reform; 2016–2021	Succeeded by Michael Matheson (Net Zero); Mairi Gougeon (Land Reform)
Party political offices
Preceded by John Swinney	Depute Leader of the Scottish National Party; 2000–2004	Succeeded by Nicola Sturgeon
