= Ken Cowan (activist) =

Scottish lawyer

- Born: 23 February 1955
- Died: 11 November 1995 (aged 40)
- Known for: AIDS activist Founder PHACE West

Ken Cowan (23 February 1955 – 11 November 1995) was a Scottish AIDS activist and founder/director of PHACE West, the project for HIV and Aids education in the West of Scotland.

== Biography ==
Cowan was a left wing activist and founder member of the Scottish Labour Party. In the late seventies, he founded the Scottish Homosexual Rights Group (now Outright Scotland) to campaign for equal rights.

In November 1994, Cowan set up PHACE West (Project for HIV/AIDS Care and Education) and with funding in 1995 conducted work in the West of Scotland.

Cowan successfully lobbied that patients be included on the carers sub-committee at Ruchill Hospital and was instrumental in the success of the West of Scotland's awareness strategy for highlighting HIV prevention initiatives for gay men.

He was also majorly involved in the development of Body Positive, the self-help agency for those living with HIV.

== Death and legacy ==
Cowan was diagnosed with HIV in 1991. He died aged 40 on 11 November 1995.

Eric Kay, in Gay Scotland's article on his passing, wrote that Cowan:

"was particularly skilful in fighting against the prejudice and dispelling the myths surrounding the virus. His eloquent delivery on the subject was always compelling, whether he was teaching young children or convincing politicians and Health Board funders. His determination ultimately brought about key policy changes which in turn have radically affected HIV Services in the West of Scotland."
