= Tayside North =

Tayside North may refer to:

- North Tayside (UK Parliament constituency) - UK Parliamentary constituency from 1983 to 2005
- North Tayside (Scottish Parliament constituency) - Scottish Parliament constituency covering the same area, from 1999.
