= Nicholas Fairbairn =

British politician

Sir Nicholas Fairbairn QC

Solicitor General for Scotland
- In office 6 May 1979 – 28 January 1982
- Preceded by: John McCluskey
- Succeeded by: Peter Fraser

Member of Parliament for Perth and Kinross Kinross and Western Perthshire (1974–1983)
- In office 10 October 1974 – 19 February 1995
- Preceded by: Alec Douglas-Home
- Succeeded by: Roseanna Cunningham

Personal details
- Born: Nicholas Hardwick Fairbairn; 24 December 1933 Edinburgh, Scotland
- Died: 19 February 1995 (aged 61) Dunfermline, Scotland
- Party: Conservative
- Spouses: Elizabeth Mackay (m. 1962; div. 1979); Suzanne Wheeler (m. 1983)
- Children: 4
- Parent: Ronald Fairbairn (father)
- Education: University of Edinburgh (MA, LLB)

Sir Nicholas Hardwick Fairbairn, QC (24 December 1933 – 19 February 1995) was a Scottish politician and advocate. He was the Conservative Member of Parliament (MP) for Kinross and Western Perthshire from October 1974 to 1983, and then for Perth and Kinross until his death in 1995. He was Solicitor General for Scotland from 1979 to 1982.

== Early life ==
Nicholas Fairbairn was born in Edinburgh on 24 December 1933, the third child and second son of Mary Ann More-Gordon and Ronald Fairbairn, a psychoanalyst.

According to Fairbairn's autobiography A Life is Too Short (1987), his father adopted the maternal role after his mother rejected him at birth. Fairbairn describes their relationship--from the time when they could begin to converse until old age affected his father twenty years later--like that of twins, with his father treating him as "his equal and confidant". Fairbairn credited this relationship as enabling him to "withstand the trauma and rejection I felt...[it] enabled me to feel secure for the rest of my life against any rejection or misfortune... made me profoundly in awe of father figures and left me with a consistent feeling... that I am still a child." Fairbairn also said he was named after Saint Nicholas as he was born on Christmas Eve.

He was educated at Loretto School and the University of Edinburgh, where he graduated with an MA and an LLB. At the age of 23, he was called to the Scots Bar.

In 1962, he married into the Scottish aristocracy—his wife, Hon. Elizabeth Mackay, was the daughter of the 13th Lord Reay. They had four children and divorced in 1979.

In 1966, Fairbairn had an affair with Esther Rantzen. In her autobiography she wrote:

"He wore idiosyncratic suits and waistcoats, and I fell in love with him. ... I didn't realise he was married until far, far too late."

— Autobiography, p.109

He began in Conservative politics by standing in the Edinburgh Central seat (which had been a Labour-held marginal seat during the 1950s) in 1964 and 1966, positioning himself as a liberal Conservative.

== Political career ==
Fairbairn's career took off in the early 1970s. In 1972 he was appointed a Scottish Queen's Counsel (QC). After the former Prime Minister Alec Douglas-Home announced his retirement from Parliament between the 1974 elections, Fairbairn was selected to succeed him. He won the seat in October 1974 with a majority of just 53 votes over the Scottish National Party.

His right-wing views endeared him to Margaret Thatcher, and when she formed her Government after winning the 1979 general election she appointed him Solicitor-General for Scotland. On one occasion he wrote that the functions of this office were "to form a second pair of hands and often a first brain for the Lord Advocate". When the Conservatives were elected Fairbairn was the only Scottish QC in the Scottish Parliamentary Conservative Party, and it is thought that as a senior advocate of some considerable achievement in the criminal courts, he fully expected to be appointed Lord Advocate. However, his colourful opinions and reputation are thought to have impelled the then Lord Justice General, Lord Emslie, to tell Thatcher that the Scottish judiciary and legal profession were deeply opposed to having such a man as the senior law officer in Scotland. That led Thatcher to offer Fairbairn the secondary post of Solicitor-General for Scotland, and give the post of Lord Advocate to the then Dean of the Faculty of Advocates, J P H Mackay QC, who was then not even a member of the Conservative Party.

Fairbairn was known at Parliament for his flamboyant Scottish baronial tartan dress. He always carried a silver miniature, working revolver on a chain attached to his belt. He was reputedly the only MP to use the House of Commons Parliamentary snuff box. He had a mistress, Pamela Milne, who attempted suicide at his London home in 1981.

Just as it seemed he had managed to survive, a major controversy emerged in Glasgow. A prosecution was dropped in a case involving the gang rape and mutilation of a young woman after doctors determined she was too traumatized to serve as a credible witness. One journalist telephoned the Solicitor-General to ask why, and Fairbairn told him. This was a major breach of protocol, and Fairbairn had to resign.

In his resignation letter of 21 January 1982, he admitted to making "errors of judgment" in his dealings with the press and that in the circumstances "I ought no longer to remain in office as Solicitor-General for Scotland". After a media campaign, a private prosecution was brought by the victim in 1982 under ancient Scottish law. It was known as the Carol X case. All three of the perpetrators were convicted, with one sentenced to 12 years in prison.

In reporting his resignation, The Glasgow Herald claimed that "it was clear" that his decision to leave office "had been forced upon him." According to the Herald up until the point he went to see Thatcher in the Prime Minister's room in the House of Commons, he "apparently had not considered resignation". However, when he arrived he was "confronted by a letter of resignation already typed out for him to sign." After a ten minute discussion he, "with some reluctance", agreed resignation was the best course of action. Matthew Parris noted that despite the manner of his departure he showed loyalty to Thatcher whom he described afterwards as "probably the warmest and kindest human being that those who have met her have ever encountered".

Fairbairn was again in the news in October 1982 when he was cited in the divorce case of investment consultant Alasdair MacInnes, having had an affair with MacInnes' wife Suzanne (whom Fairbairn ultimately married in 1983). When this was reported he launched an attack on the press for what he viewed as its "hypocritical moral crusades".

In 1983, Fairbairn was elected an honorary Fellow of the International Academy of Trial Lawyers, and he became a Trustee of the Royal Museums of Scotland in 1987. He was also President of the Society for the Preservation of Duddingston Village (an eastern suburb of Edinburgh).

Fairbairn was knighted in the 1988 Birthday Honours for political service.

== Views ==
The Independent said about Fairbairn's politics, "At heart he was a libertarian who wanted to espouse human rights and civil liberties. Realising the temper of the times, he moved during the Seventies to the radical right: the clash this involved with his instinctive penchant for moral and personal freedom made him an anarchist of the right".

He called members of the band Throbbing Gristle "wreckers of civilisation" in 1976 in a row over public funding of the arts. He also criticised Scottish performers Simple Minds and Annie Lennox for taking part in the 1988 Nelson Mandela 70th Birthday Tribute concert in Wembley Stadium, describing them as "left-wing scum". Fairbairn was quoted: "These so-called stars like Annie Lennox and Jim Kerr are just out to line their own pockets.... and what Annie Lennox and Jim Kerr said at Wembley came out of no love for Nelson Mandela. It came from a desire to make money."

Fairbairn was a staunch supporter of Section 28 of the Local Government Act 1988, which prohibited local authorities from "promoting homosexuality". He described the gay tenor Peter Pears as suffering from the "morbid squint" of homosexuality.

During parliamentary debates in 1994 regarding equalising the age of consent for heterosexual and homosexual acts, Fairbairn was called to order when he graphically described an act of anal sex between men "putting your penis into another man's arsehole is a perversion", which he considered a "psycho-pathological perversion". He voted against equalising the age of consent in 1994 although earlier in his career had been a supporter of the Scottish Minorities Group, a Scottish gay rights organisation.

== Final years ==
In 1983 he married Suzanne Mary Wheeler, known as Lady Sam Fairbairn.

Fairbairn had stated that he would stand down at the 1997 general election, but he died before then, at Queen Margaret Hospital in Dunfermline, on 19 February 1995, aged 61. The cause was liver disease, a consequence of longstanding alcoholism. In the subsequent by-election, his seat was won by Roseanna Cunningham of the Scottish National Party, with the Conservatives falling to third place.

== Posthumous allegations of child abuse and sexual assaults ==
Though he was never charged with any offence, allegations of child molestation against Fairbairn emerged after his death. He was also posthumously accused of sexual assault against an adult female.

Legal offices
Preceded by Lord McCluskey	Solicitor General for Scotland; 1979–1982	Succeeded by Peter Fraser
Parliament of the United Kingdom
Preceded by Sir Alec Douglas-Home	Member of Parliament for Kinross and Western Perthshire; Oct 1974–1983	Constituency abolished
New constituency	Member of Parliament for Perth and Kinross; 1983–1995	Succeeded by Roseanna Cunningham
