= Gay Scotland =

LGBT magazine in Scotland

Gay Scotland (also known as GS) was an LGBT magazine published – directly and indirectly – by gay rights organisation, the Scottish Homosexual Rights Group (SHRG) – later Outright Scotland – between 1982 and the early 2000s.

== Origins ==
SHRG, originally launched in May 1969 as the Scottish Minorities Group (SMG), began publishing a foolscap-sized members-only newsletter, SMG News, from January 1971. The first issue consisted of two typed pages with no illustrations or photographs; the newsletter was edited and produced by John Breslin, who was secretary of SMG for several years.

From 1 October 1978, as part of the organisation's relaunch as SHRG, the newsletter – by then edited by Glasgow-based Paul Brownsey – was relaunched as the A4-sized Gay Scotland—subtitled "The Monthly Newsletter of the Scottish Homosexual Rights Group". However, like its predecessor, this new publication remained a very basic, text-only publication, reproduced as cheaply as possible using a Gestetner duplicating machine.

After four years in the editorial chair, Brownsey resigned mid-1981. With no obvious successor editor in place, SHRG's National Executive Committee – at its October 1981 meeting – approved a proposal put forward by original SMG founder (and then current Chair) Ian Dunn to relaunch Gay Scotland as a more widely-distributed, outward-looking bimonthly magazine, with significantly improved content, reproduction and design.

As reported in the second-last issue of the Gay Scotland newsletter, this idea was not wholly welcomed by some members of SHRG, who feared that the revised publication would be a drain on SHRG's limited financial resources and was "a one-man idea, which has been sprung on us and is being railroaded through with little or no reference to what the majority of members feel should be getting done".

The "final edition of Gay Scotland in newsletter form" was published in January 1982.

It is worth noting that both the later newsletter and magazine shared not just the same name but also the same ISSN: 0142-0313. Despite the clear "new beginning" suggested by launching with "Issue One" in March 1982, the shared ISSN means the "new" magazine can be considered a direct continuation of SMG News, launched in January 1971.

== Magazine ==
The first issue of the new-look, glossy-covered Gay Scotland was published on 1 March 1982.

However, Dunn had in fact produced a four-page "Issue Zero" dated December 1981 to help give attendees at a SHRG "national forum" event (held in Edinburgh on 28 November 1981) an idea of what the relaunched publication would look like.

Although copies of the new Gay Scotland were sold through several independent and radical bookshops around Scotland, copies were still sent out to SHRG members as part of their membership package. To begin with, these included a central "Pink Pages" insert covering specific SHRG news and activities. However, this practice was discontinued from the fourth issue (cover dated September/October 1982), in part to make way for the inclusion of what would become a regular central "Yellow Pages" pull-out gathering together "Scene" news and cultural/arts listings.

By its first anniversary, Gay Scotland was selling around 2,000 copies an issue—reaching, according to editor Ian Dunn, "20 times" the readership of the SHRG newsletter.

== Ownership ==
Although always "editorially independent" of SHRG/Outright Scotland, the magazine was initially published directly by the campaign group. By the 1990s, however, the role of publisher had been switched to Calosa Publishing Ltd, a company owned by SHRG—in part to reduce the charity's direct liabilities should the magazine fold. After SHRG relaunched as Outright Scotland, the magazine’s publisher became Outright Scotland Community Press Ltd, again wholly owned by the charity but legally distinct from it. Both companies have long since been dissolved.

The URL GayScotland.com was originally registered on 27 January 2000 and is currently set to expire on 28 January 2026; it was most recently updated on 2 January 2025, although the identity of who did so is not publicly available.

== Format ==
For most of its history Gay Scotland (sometimes branded as GS) was either a bimonthly or monthly A4 magazine. However, in an attempt to reach significantly more readers – including "isolated men and women as well as regular scene-goers", according to one editorial – GS was relaunched, in 1998, as a monthly tabloid-sized newspaper with a deliberately increased circulation (12,000 copies) and distribution which went well beyond traditional LGBT venues.

== Editors ==
Editors of Gay Scotland included Ian C Dunn, John Hein, Dominic D'Angelo, and Andrew Wilson.

== Legacy ==
For many years, the magazine was an invaluable source of information for LGBT readers across Scotland. Through the HIV/AIDS epidemic it provided its readers with contemporary debates around HIV and Aids, keeping them informed on the latest healthcare developments, and debunking many myths.

As the first publication of its kind in Scotland, Gay Scotland arguably inspired future publications produced specifically for the country's LGBT+ community. Its most successful successor – and rival – in terms of number of issues published was ScotsGay. Published and often edited by former Gay Scotland editor John Hein, ScotsGay ran for 176 issues of between December 1994 and October 2016.

A near complete run of Gay Scotland (excepting "Issue 0") can be found at the National Library of Scotland, while copies are also part of the Lothian Health Services Archive in the collection of the Lothian Gay and Lesbian Switchboard.

== See also ==
- LGBT Rights in Scotland
- List of LGBT periodicals
- LGBT movements
