= Sheila MacAskill =

Scottish gay rights campaigner (1946–2020)

- Born: 1946
- Died: 17 April 2020 (aged 73–74); Glasgow, Scotland
- Known for: Scottish gay rights campaigner

Sheila Lennox MacAskill (1946 – 17 April 2020) was a Scottish gay rights campaigner who had a pivotal role in decriminalising homosexuality in Scotland. MacAskill was also the first Chairwoman of the Scottish Minorities Group (SMG), their only female executive, and was responsible for establishing their first premises on Sauchiehall Street, Glasgow, in 1977.

== Early life ==
MacAskill declared that she came out of the womb gay, "end of story".

Even though sex between women was not criminalised in law, it was not socially accepted either, making it difficult for women to find each other. In response, MacAskill set up social events for women to meet. At one of these events MacAskill met her lifelong partner, Elizabeth Elliott. Speaking about this, Elizabeth said: "She (Sheila) set up discos in Glasgow for men and women which were absolutely marvellous... Glasgow City Council granted a licence, but at the same time you had one eye on the door because the law had not changed and we could get raided....However, the atmosphere was terrific. Sheila was the DJ and ran themed discos which resulted in a competition to judge best outfits."

== Campaigning ==
In the 1960s and 1970s there were concerns over the police forces' attitudes to homosexuals. This not only included gay men who were arrested, but those who might be victims of crimes too. In March 1976, when Sheila was National Chairwoman of the Scottish Minorities Group (SMG), she wrote to the chief constables of Scotland's police forces:

"There is a myth among homosexuals that there is no point expecting help from the police if they are robbed or mugged, and one or two unsubstantiated stories being passed around appear to support this view. We would welcome your help in trying to dispel this myth [ ... ] The situation is complicated by the state of the law on homosexual conduct in Scotland, but we expect that, for example, a burglary of a homosexual's home would be investigated as thoroughly as any other burglary."

MacAskill worked with Derek Ogg to contest the illegality of homosexuality in Scotland. Now no longer in line with England and Wales, where homosexuality was already decriminalised, MacAskill made a submission to the European Commission on Human Rights. She said that attitudes in Scottish society at the time were "calculated to make the homosexual see him or herself in a quite evil and guilty aspect".

She continued: "I am, as a self-avowed homosexual woman, subject to many discriminatory attitudes which effectively applied, can and do inhibit and deny my ability to be a fully participating and integrated member of this Scottish society to which I rightfully belong."

== Death and legacy ==
By the time the Criminal Justice (Scotland) Act 1980 was amended, MacAskill had developed Lupus and retreated from public life. She died from a stroke and complications at the Queen Elizabeth University Hospital in 2020. Her significant contribution to advancement of equal rights for gay men and lesbians in Scotland at that time is a legacy which is still noted today.
