= Derek Ogg =

Scottish lawyer (1954–2020)

Derek Andrew Ogg QC
- Born: 19 September 1954
- Died: 1 May 2020 (aged 65)

Derek Andrew Ogg QC (1954 – 1 May 2020) was a Scottish lawyer who, through the Historical Sexual Offences Pardons and Disregards Scotland Bill, campaigned for automatic pardons for gay and bisexual men with historical convictions of sexual offences that are no longer illegal in Scotland. In 1983 Ogg established the Scottish HIV and AIDS awareness charity Scottish AIDS Monitor.

== Activism ==
Ogg's activism started with his membership of the Scottish Minorities Group (later Outright Scotland) where in 1974, together with Ian Dunn, he organised the International Gay Rights Congress in Edinburgh, which later resulted in the establishment of the International Lesbian & Gay Association.

In 1983, after hearing about a disease affecting gay men in the United States, Derek Ogg, along with Edward McGough, Nigel Cook and Simon Taylor set up the Scottish AIDS Monitor to educate gay men about the risks of HIV and AIDS. He served on the board of Directors until 1994. In the 1980s much of his activism was around the issues of HIV and AIDS, where along with Scottish AIDS Monitor he was also involved in the establishment of Waverley Care through which the Milestone Hospice, the UK's first purpose built hospice for HIV patients, was established in 1991.

Ogg was involved in the campaign to end the ban on gay sex in Scotland which was formally lifted in 1981 with the Criminal Justice (Scotland) Act 1980.

He was also an activist against Section 28 (Clause 2A in Scotland) which was repealed in Scotland in 2000 and England Wales in 2003.

In 2015 he was presented with a special award for Lifetime Achievement at the inaugural Scottish LGBTI Awards in recognition of his activism and legal work.

He also campaigned for an apology from the Scottish Government in 2017 to gay and bisexual men who had been convicted prior to 2001, under discriminatory laws against same-sex sexual activity that had since been made legal.

== Career as Queen's Counsel ==
He was a solicitor in private practice before becoming a member of the Faculty of Advocates in 1989, receiving the award of Queen's Counsel in 1999.

As a QC, he led the prosecution in the trial of Malcolm Webster and became the first head of the National Sexual Crimes Unit in 2009.
