= Perthshire North =

Region or constituency of the Scottish Parliament

- County constituency for the Scottish Parliament
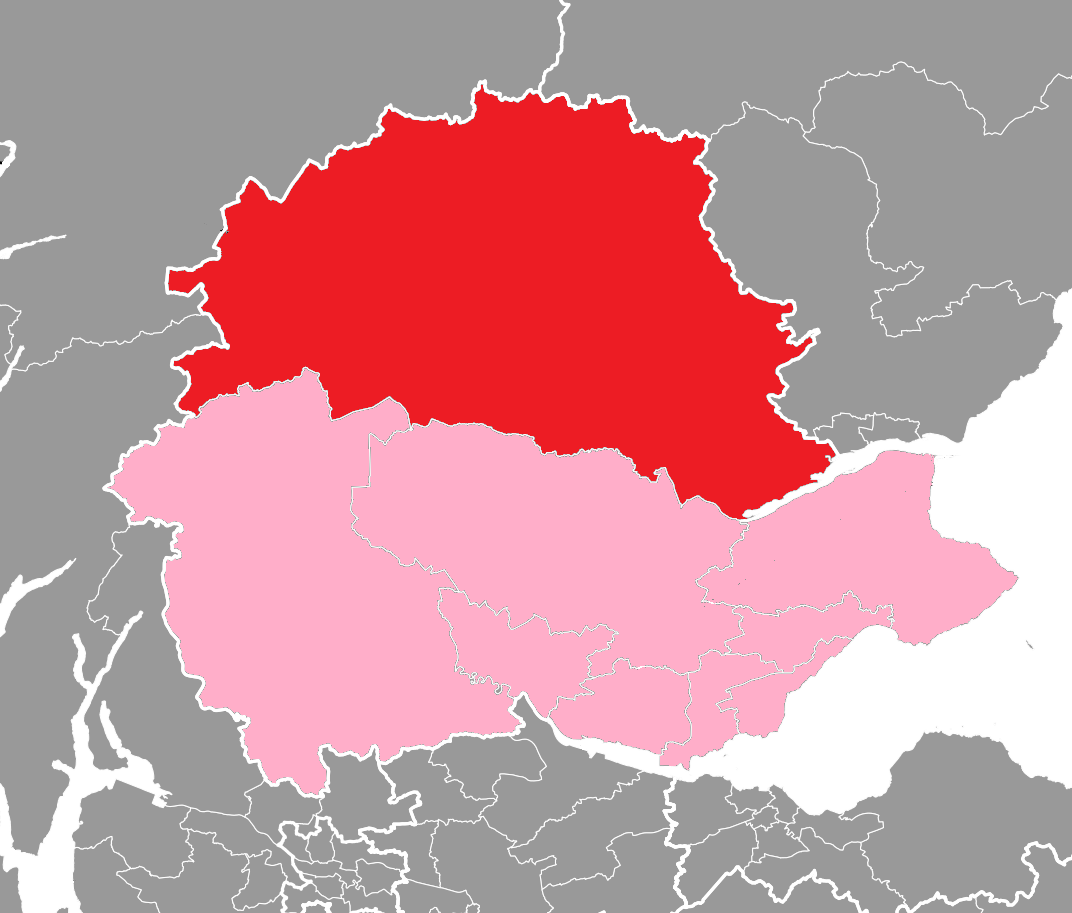

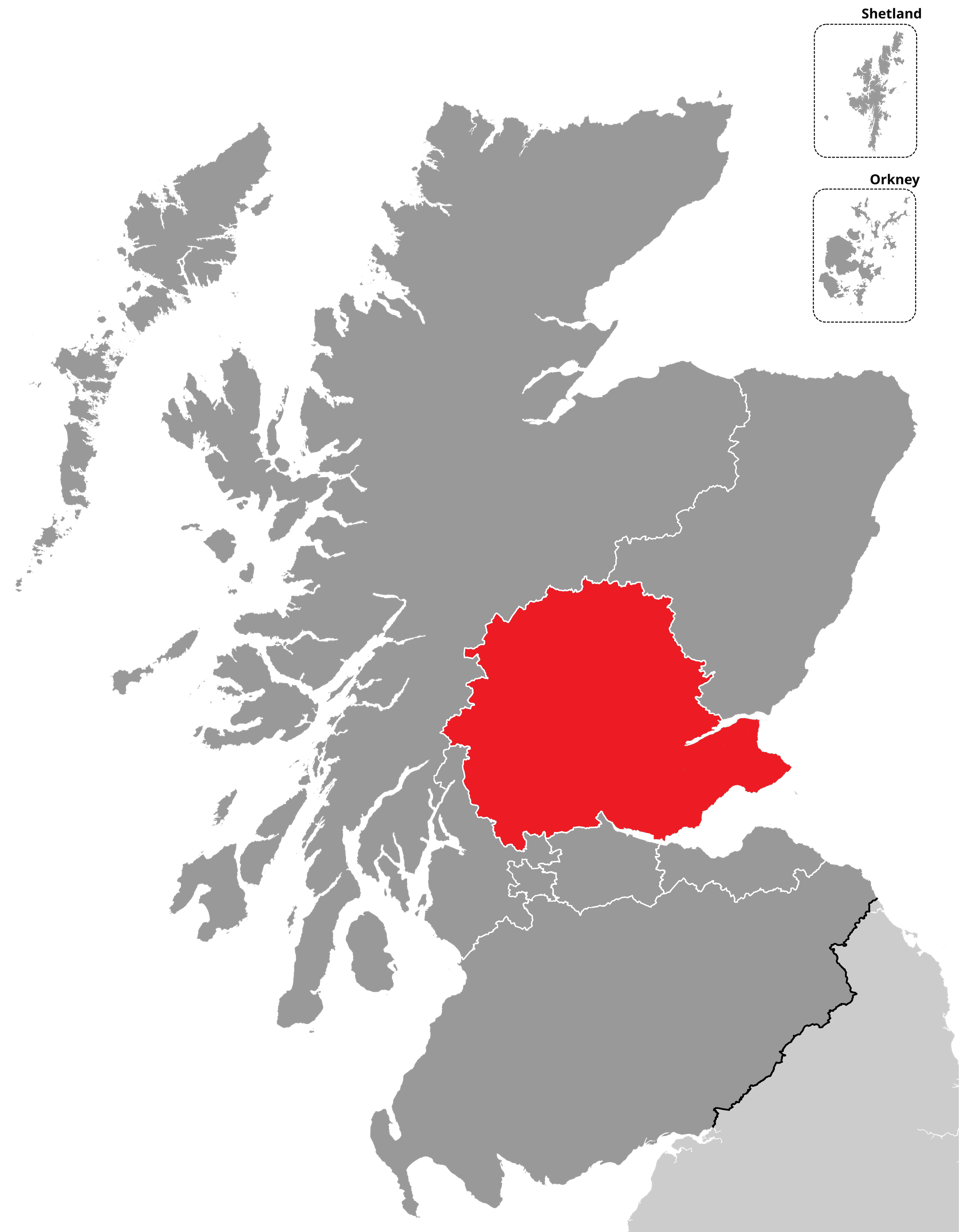
- Perthshire North shown within the Mid Scotland and Fife electoral region and the region shown within Scotland
- Electoral region: Mid Scotland and Fife
- Electorate: 62,265 (2026)

Current constituency
- Created: 2011
- Party: Scottish National Party
- MSP: John Swinney
- Council area: Perth and Kinross
- Created from: North Tayside, Perth

Perthshire North is a county constituency of the Scottish Parliament covering part of the council area of Perth and Kinross. Under the additional-member electoral system used for elections to the Scottish Parliament, it elects one Member of the Scottish Parliament (MSP) by the plurality (first past the post) method of election. It is also one of nine constituencies in the Mid Scotland and Fife electoral region, which elects seven additional members, in addition to the nine constituency MSPs, to produce a form of proportional representation for the region as a whole.

The constituency was created for the 2011 Scottish Parliament election, and comprises areas that were formerly part of the constituencies of Angus, Perth and North Tayside, which were abolished. Since first created it has been held by John Swinney of the Scottish National Party, who was previously the member for North Tayside. Swinney has been First Minister of Scotland since May 2024.

== Electoral region ==
The other eight constituencies of the Mid Scotland and Fife region are: Clackmannanshire and Dunblane, Cowdenbeath, Dunfermline, Fife North East, Kirkcaldy, Mid Fife and Glenrothes, Perthshire South and Kinross-shire and Stirling. The region covers all of the Clackmannanshire council area, all of the Fife council area, all of the Perth and Kinross council area and all of the Stirling council area.

== Constituency boundaries and council area ==
Map of boundaries from 2011

Perth and Kinross is represented in the Scottish Parliament by two constituencies, Perthshire North and Perthshire South and Kinross-shire, which together cover the entire council area.

When the Scottish Parliament was established constituency boundaries were the same as the pre-existing House of Commons constituencies, and consequently Perth and Kinross was spread across four constituencies: Angus, North Tayside, Ochil and Perth. Ahead of the 2005 United Kingdom general election UK and Scottish parliamentary constituencies were separated, and there is no longer any link between the two sets of boundaries. Scottish Parliament constituencies were reviewed ahead of the 2011 Scottish Parliament election by the first periodic review of Scottish Parliament boundaries, and the existing constituencies covering Perth and Kinross were abolished, leading to the current situation.

Perthshire North covers the northern part of Perth and Kinross, including part of the City of Perth, and the towns of Aberfeldy, Blairgowrie and Rattray, Coupar Angus, Dunkeld, Pitlochry and Scone. Much of the north of the constituency forms part of the Cairngorms National Park. The electoral wards of Perth and Kinross Council used in the formation of Perthshire North are listed below:

- Carse of Gowrie
- Strathmore
- Blairgowrie and Glens
- Highland
- Strathtay
- Perth City Centre

At the second periodic review of Scottish Parliament boundaries in 2025 the seat boundaries were amended very slightly to reflect changes in the boundaries of the above wards, although the seat continues to be formed of the same wards as at the first periodic review.

== Member of the Scottish Parliament ==
Election	Member	Party
2011	John Swinney (Note: Incumbent for North Tayside constituency since 1999.)	Scottish National Party

== Election results ==
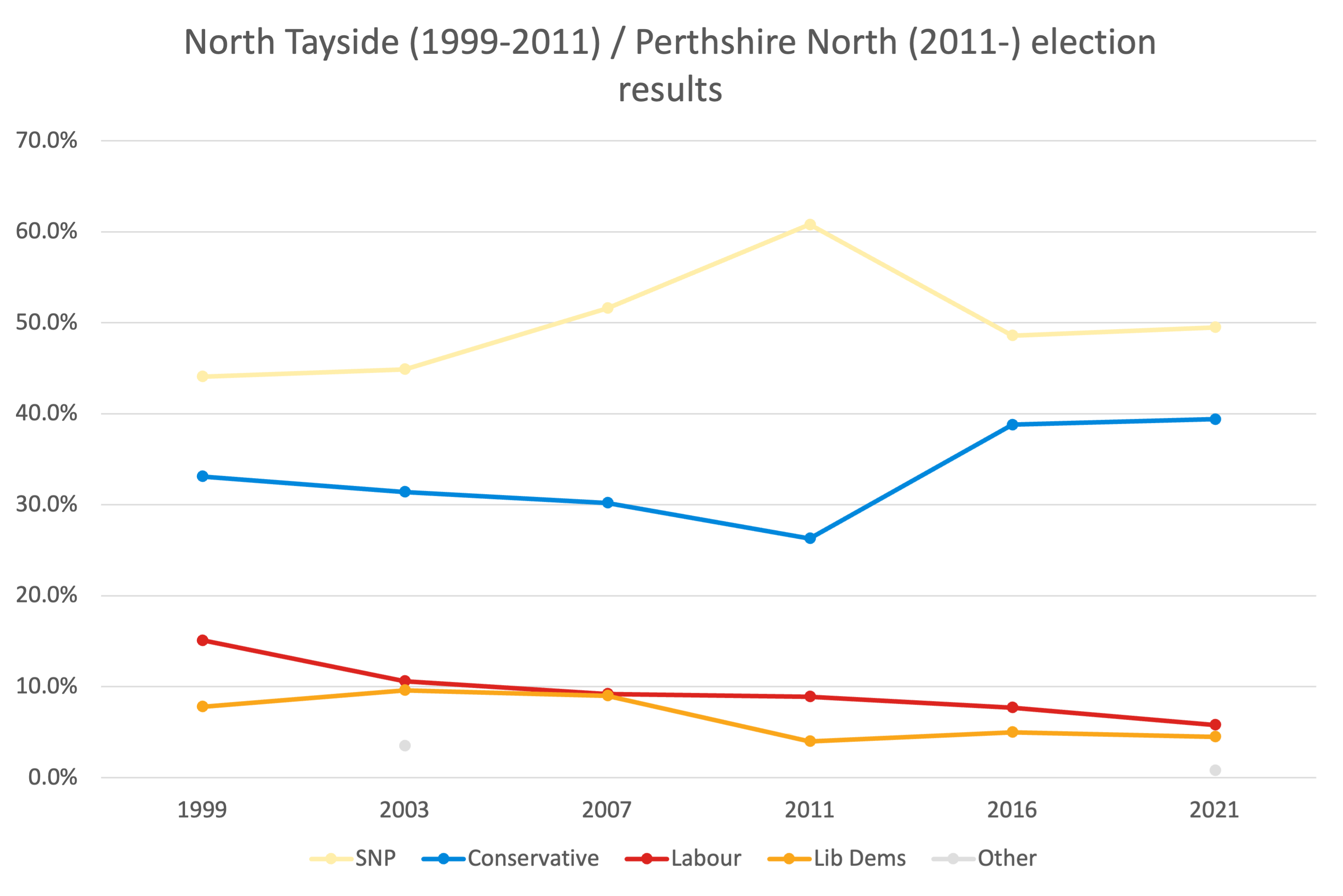
Perthshire North election results 1999-2021

=== 2020s ===
2026 Scottish Parliament election: Perthshire North
Party	Candidate	Constituency			Regional		
Party	Candidate	Votes	%	±%	Votes	%	±%
SNP	John Swinney (Note: Incumbent member for this constituency)	16,414	45.4	▼4.3	11,702	32.3	▼7.8
Conservative	Murdo Fraser (Note: Incumbent member on the party list, or for another constituency)	10,171	28.1	▼11.1	8,797	24.3	▼12.3
Reform	Kenneth Morton	4,620	12.8	New	5,236	14.4	▲14.2
Green					4,242	11.7	▲3.6
Liberal Democrats	Claire McLaren	2,741	7.6	▲3.1	2,719	7.5	▲3.2
Labour	Angela Bailey	2,240	6.2	▲0.4	2,423	6.7	▼0.4
Independent Green Voice					284	0.8	New
AtLS					275	0.8	New
Scottish Family					227	0.6	▲0.1
ISP					182	0.5	New
Scottish Socialist					91	0.3	New
Scottish Libertarian					46	0.1	0.0
Advance UK					40	0.1	New
Majority		6,243	17.3	▲7.2			
Valid votes		36,186			36,264		
Invalid votes		158			94		
Turnout		36,344	58.4	▼11.5	36,358	58.4	▼11.5
SNP hold		Swing					
Notes

2021 Scottish Parliament election: Perthshire North
Party	Candidate	Constituency			Regional		
Party	Candidate	Votes	%	±%	Votes	%	±%
SNP	John Swinney (Note: Incumbent member for this constituency)	19,860	49.5	▲0.9	16,090	40.1	▼1.6
Conservative	Murdo Fraser (Note: Incumbent member on the party list, or for another constituency)	15,807	39.4	▲0.6	14,670	36.5	▼1.7
Green					3,241	8.1	▲2.1
Labour	Ryan Smart	2,324	5.8	▼1.9	2,838	7.1	▼0.5
Liberal Democrats	Peter Barrett	1,802	4.5	▼0.5	1,728	4.3	▲0.4
Alba					658	1.6	New
All for Unity					270	0.7	New
Scottish Family	Donald Marshall	334	0.8	New	230	0.6	New
Reform					111	0.3	New
Abolish the Scottish Parliament					105	0.3	New
Freedom Alliance (UK)					96	0.2	New
Scottish Libertarian					51	0.1	▼0.1
UKIP					34	0.1	▼1.8
Independent	Martin Keatings				25	0.1	New
Renew					8	0.0	New
Independent	Mercy Kamanja				4	0.0	New
Majority		4,053	10.1	▲0.3			
Valid votes		40,127			40,159		
Invalid votes		141			73		
Turnout		40,268	69.9	▲6.9	40,232	69.9	▲6.9
SNP hold		Swing					

=== 2010s ===
2016 Scottish Parliament election: Perthshire North
Party	Candidate	Constituency			Regional		
Party	Candidate	Votes	%	±%	Votes	%	±%
SNP	John Swinney (Note: Incumbent member for this constituency)	16,526	48.6	▼12.2	14,218	41.7	▼11.4
Conservative	Murdo Fraser (Note: Incumbent member on the party list, or for another constituency)	13,190	38.8	▲12.5	13,038	38.2	▲13.2
Labour	Anna McEwan	2,604	7.7	▼1.2	2,599	7.6	▼1.4
Green					2,045	6.0	▲1.5
Liberal Democrats	Peter Barrett	1,705	5.0	▲1.0	1,336	3.9	▲0.2
UKIP					634	1.9	▲0.8
RISE					104	0.3	New
Solidarity					78	0.2	▲0.1
Scottish Libertarian					60	0.2	New
Majority		3,336	9.8	▼24.7			
Valid votes		34,025			34,112		
Invalid votes		112			59		
Turnout		34,137	63.0	▲6.7	34,171	63.0	▲6.7
SNP hold		Swing					
Notes

2011 Scottish Parliament election: Perthshire North
Party	Candidate	Constituency			Region		
Party	Candidate	Votes	%	±%	Votes	%	±%
SNP	John Swinney (Note: Incumbent member for the North Tayside constituency)	18,219	60.8	N/A	15,908	53.1	N/A
Conservative	Murdo Fraser (Note: Incumbent member on the party list, or for another constituency)	7,866	26.3	N/A	7,491	25.0	N/A
Labour	Pete Cheema	2,672	8.9	N/A	2,690	9.0	N/A
Green					1,359	4.5	N/A
Liberal Democrats	Victor Clements	1,196	4.0	N/A	1,121	3.7	N/A
Scottish Senior Citizens					440	1.5	N/A
UKIP					334	1.1	N/A
BNP					187	0.6	N/A
Scottish Christian					110	0.4	N/A
Socialist Labour					97	0.3	N/A
CPA					88	0.3	N/A
Scottish Socialist					74	0.2	N/A
Independent	Andrew Roger				42	0.1	N/A
Solidarity					17	0.1	N/A
Majority		10,353	34.5	N/A			
Valid votes		29,953			29,958		
Invalid votes		117			117		
Turnout		30,070	56.3	N/A	30,075	56.3	N/A
SNP win (new seat)							

== See also ==
- Perth and North Perthshire (UK Parliament constituency)

Preceded by Glasgow Pollok	Constituency represented by the First Minister; 2024 – present	Incumbent
