= Scottish AIDS Monitor =

Scottish organisation (1983–1996)

Scottish AIDS Monitor (SAM) was a Scottish HIV and AIDS awareness organisation that was active between 1983 and 1996.

== History ==
In 1983, after becoming aware of the spread of an illness affecting gay men in the United States, Derek Ogg set up Scottish AIDS Monitor in Edinburgh, along with Edward McGough, Nigel Cook and Simon Taylor, in order to inform and educate gay men about HIV and AIDS. The organisation was established before the first case of HIV was recorded in Scotland and three years before the first government AIDS awareness campaign. Ogg served as Chair of Board, other board members included McGough, Cook, Taylor, Joy Barlow, and Alistair Hume, Maureen Moore served as SAM's Chief Executive, Steve Retson was Strathclyde Projects Manager, Paul Trainer worked as Edinburgh administrator and Eric Kay was Gay Outreach Worker for Strathclyde. The organisation's controlling company was SAFE Ltd. By 1988 SAM had six paid employees and 200 volunteers. In addition to their original Edinburgh branch, by the late 1980s, the organisation had branches in Highland, Lothian, Tayside and Strathclyde. SAM was funded by private donations and public funding. The organisation was awarded £25,000 by the government's Scottish Home and Health department in 1988 and also received funding from Strathclyde and Lothian Health Boards.

Ogg stepped down from the board of directors in 1994 and was replaced by Linda MacCallum. Maureen Moore resigned as Chief Executive in 1995 and went on to establish Project for HIV and Aids Care and Education (PHACE West). In 1995 the four Strathclyde Health Boards withdrew funding from SAM and allocated it to the new PHACE West service, citing lack of West of Scotland representation on SAM's board of directors and concerns about the service provided in the West of the country, claims that were disputed by MacCallum. SAM ceased operating in the West of Scotland later in 1995, and after funding was withdrawn by Lothian Health Board in 1996, the organisation closed down.

== Activities ==
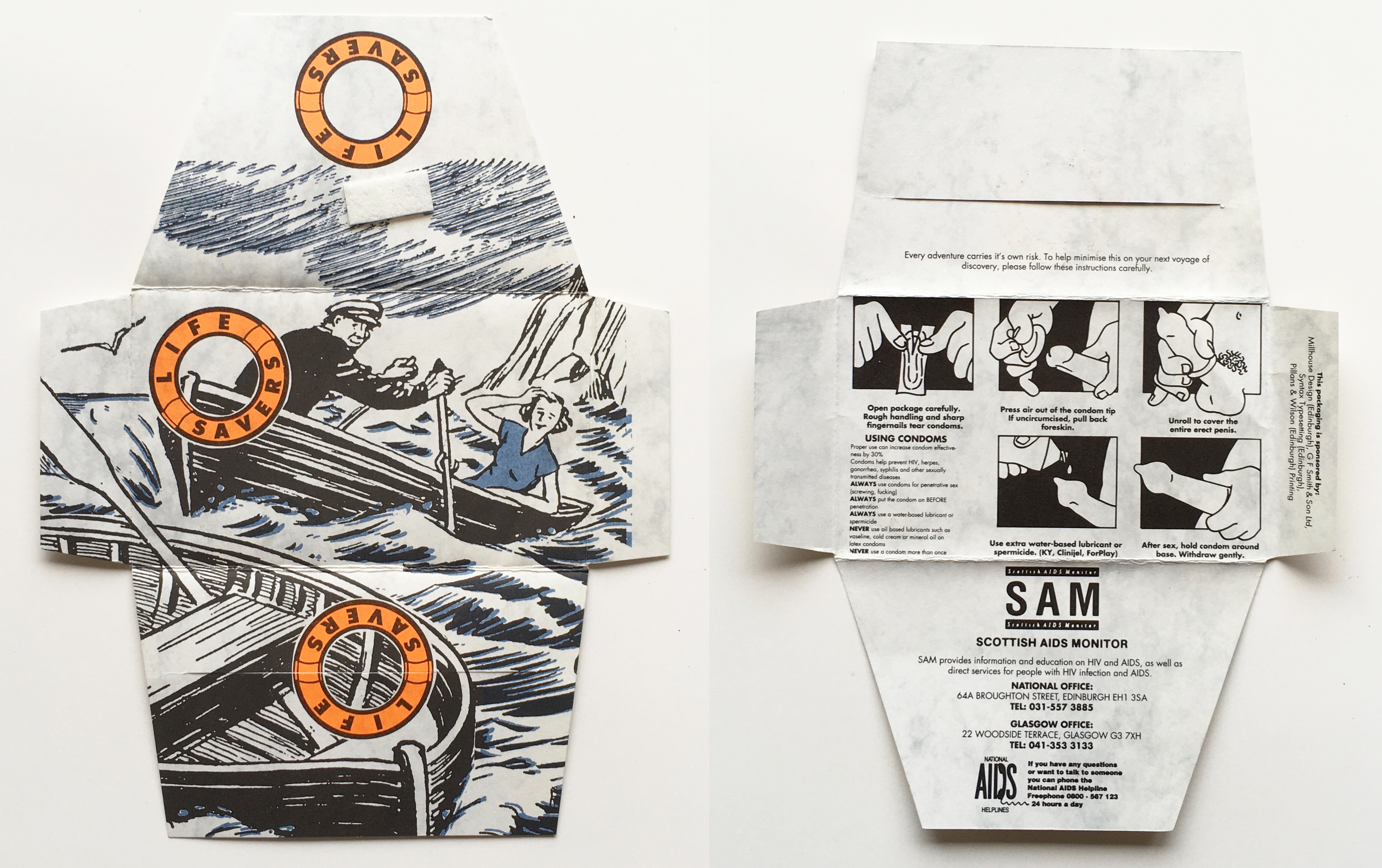
SAM safe sex condom packet

Initially SAM focused on raising awareness of AIDS and promoting safe sex among gay men, but the organisation expanded its activities to include all groups affected by HIV and AIDS, including homosexuals, heterosexuals, teenagers, drug users, sex workers and prison inmates. The organisation worked with the Genito Urinary Medicine unit at Edinburgh Royal Infirmary in order to ensure the information they provided was accurate and up to date. SAM's activities included advocacy, awareness raising, advisory, support and prevention services. The organisation trained AIDS counsellors and hospital visitors and set up "Buddy" and HIV support groups. They also ran AIDS information phone lines in both Glasgow and Edinburgh, worked with drug counselling agencies, promoted safe sex and distributed free condoms. In 1994 SAM set up Gay Men's Health, the UK's first dedicated health initiative for gay and bisexual men. The organisation was also instrumental in setting up Body Positive Scotland, a self help group for people living with and affected by HIV and AIDS.

== Promotional campaigns and creative works ==
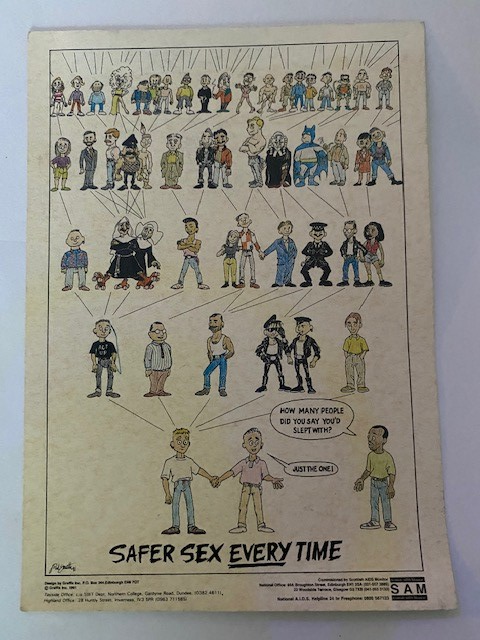
Scottish AIDS Monitor safer sex every time postcard

SAM created a wide range of visually creative promotional campaigns, sometimes featuring explicit imagery, which focused on raising awareness of HIV and AIDS and promoting safe sex. Examples of SAM's advertising campaign materials are held in the Wellcome Collection and the UK HIV/AIDS Design Archive.

In 1991 SAM participated in Read My Lips: New York AIDS Polemics, an exhibition at Glasgow Tramway (arts centre) curated by Nicola White, where they distributed HIV / AIDS awareness information and safe sex promotional materials.

In 1995 Scottish AIDS Monitor collaborated with 7:84 Theatre Company to create Talking Bollocks a theatrical performance composed of a series of monologues based on the real experiences and lives of eight gay men living in Scotland. The piece was co-directed by Natalie Wilson and performed at the Citizens Theatre in Glasgow as part of the city's Glasgay! Festival. Talking Bollocks was re-staged at Glasgow Tramway during the Mayfest arts festival in 1996.
