= Ian Dunn (activist) =

Scottish gay rights and pro-paedophilia campaigner

- Born: Ian Campbell Dunn; 1 May 1943; Glasgow, Scotland
- Died: 10 March 1998 (aged 54); Edinburgh, Scotland
- Occupations: Meteorologist; town planner; magazine editor
- Years active: 1967–1998
- Known for: Founder of Scottish Minorities Group; Co-founder of Paedophile Information Exchange
- Partner: Ross Watt

Ian Campbell Dunn (1 May 1943 – 10 March 1998) was a Scottish gay rights and pro-paedophilia campaigner. He was founder of The Scottish Minorities Group (later known as Outright Scotland), one of the first British gay rights organisations, and helped establish Britain's first gay newspaper, Gay News. Dunn also worked as the editor of Gay Scotland magazine and co-founded the Paedophile Information Exchange.

== Early life ==
Ian Dunn was born in Glasgow, Scotland in 1943 to Donald and Audrey Dunn. He attended Hillhead High School in the city. He worked as a meteorologist at the Met Office. Dunn then moved to Edinburgh, studying town planning at Heriot Watt University. He failed to graduate from the university, but still worked for the city's planning department.

== Activism ==
=== Gay rights activism ===
In January 1969, Dunn founded the Scottish Minorities Group, holding its inaugural meeting in his parents' house in Glasgow. His early activism was inspired by the fact that 1967 reforms in the law concerning gay sex only applied to England and Wales and thus gay sex continued to be illegal in Scotland. Dunn took a leading role in legalising gay sex in Scotland, and along with two other activists he took the case to the European Court of Human Rights. In 1980, the previous reforms of 1967 reforms were extended to cover Scotland.

The Scottish Minorities Group later re-branded as Outright Scotland, with Dunn also running the organisation.

In 1972, Dunn helped to launch Gay News, Britain's first gay newspaper.

Along with Derek Ogg, in 1974, Dunn convened the International Gay Rights Congress in Edinburgh, which was the first post-war international conference of homosexual rights movements. The event gave rise to the International Lesbian & Gay Association.

Dunn also established the Edinburgh Gay & Lesbian Community Centre in 1974.

Dunn co-presented a 1976 BBC television documentary on gay rights.

=== Politics ===
Dunn was a member of the Labour Party and a trade union activist in Nalgo and UNISON. He was a local council candidate for Labour, but was dropped by the party when his paedophile activism was exposed in the media. Dunn later returned to the Labour Party, and applied to become a candidate in the new Scottish Parliament.

=== Paedophile Information Exchange ===
Dunn co-founded the Paedophile Information Exchange (PIE) in 1974. The organisation campaigned to legalise sex between adults and children, and to promote acceptance and understanding of adults having sex with children, with Dunn considered to be an influential member of the campaign. However, Dunn said he was not a paedophile himself.

Dunn agreed for his home in Edinburgh to be used as a contact address for paedophile theoretical journal named Minor Problems, which had been expelled from its previous mailing facility. He was the subject of a front-page exposé by the Sunday Mail. Although he sued the paper, he later dropped the action.

A number of key PIE figures were imprisoned in 1984 and the group was closed down shortly afterwards.

Dunn organised and advertised openly pro-paedophile meetings in both Glasgow and Edinburgh. He stated of the subject: "I am not one of those homosexuals who get cross or nervous when the subject of love between men and boys is raised."

In January 2007 after it emerged that Dunn, after whom the Ian Dunn Memorial Award was named, had been a founder member of PIE, lesbian Scottish Liberal Democrat politician Margaret Smith threatened to return her 2004 award unless it was renamed. She stated: "I was totally and utterly unaware of the allegations when I accepted the award and I am very upset. Obviously I absolutely condemn paedophilia and anyone who is apologist for it." Bisexual Scottish Greens MSP Patrick Harvie, the 2003 recipient of the award, also suggested it should be renamed. The Ian Dunn Memorial Award is no longer listed on the official website of the Terrence Higgins Trust Scotland, which until 2007 had been responsible for managing the award.

In 1998, British LGBT+ rights activist Peter Tatchell wrote an obituary in The Independent for Dunn. However, on learning of Dunn's paedophile activism, he later stated:

Neither I nor most other people had any knowledge of [Dunn's] link with [the Paedophile Information Exchange] at the time. I only found out many years after I wrote his obituary. I would not have written it if I had known about his PIE work.

== Death and legacy ==
Dunn lived in Broughton, Edinburgh and died of a heart attack in the city on 10 March 1998. He was survived by his partner, Ross Watt.

Dunn's funeral took place on 18 March 1998 at Mansfield Place Church, Edinburgh. A young man at the funeral claimed to have been raped by Dunn when he was 15 years old and stated he was attending "to make sure he was dead".

An inventory of his correspondence and papers is held at the National Library of Scotland in Edinburgh and in 2018, the library featured a display concerning his life and work. The display was later removed when the library was informed of Dunn's paedophile rights work by The Times newspaper.
