= Maureen Moore (activist) =

Scottish AIDS activist

Maureen Moore OBE was national co-ordinator, then director of Scottish AIDS Monitor from its inception in 1983.

After leaving SAM, Moore went on to chair the Scottish voluntary sector's HIV and AIDS forum and the Board of Project for HIV/AIDS Care and Education (PHACE West) in Glasgow. This enabled her to continue lobbying for improved awareness of heterosexual transmission of HIV and better education and HIV prevention services for gay men.

In 1995 Moore took over from Alison Hillhouse as chief executive at ASH Scotland where she supported the ban on smoking in workplaces in Scotland and the ban on tobacco sales to under 18s.

She was awarded an OBE for services to healthcare in 2006.

== See also ==
- Smoking, Health and Social Care (Scotland) Act
