= Minister for Agriculture, Marine and the Islands =

Junior ministerial post in Scottish government

Minister for Agriculture, Marine & the Islands
- Scottish Gaelic: Ministear airson Àiteachais, Mara agus nan Eileanan

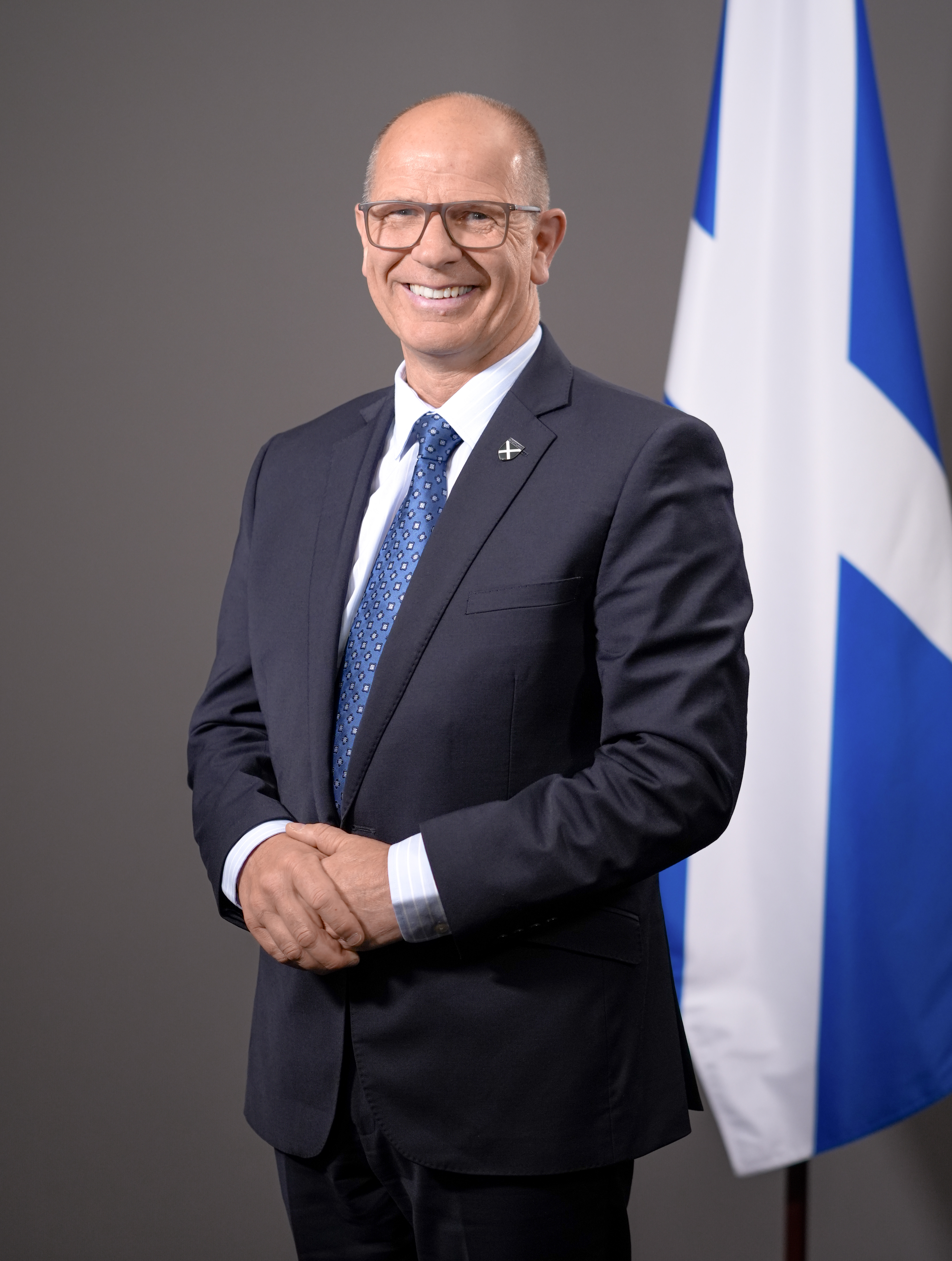
- Incumbent; Jim Fairlie since 20 February 2024
- Style: Minister(within parliament); Agriculture Minister (informal); Scottish Agriculture Minister (outwith Scotland)
- Member of: Scottish Parliament; Scottish Government
- Reports to: Scottish Parliament; First Minister; Cabinet Secretary for Rural Affairs, Land Reform and Islands
- Seat: Edinburgh
- Appointer: First Minister; (following approval from Scottish Parliament)
- Inaugural holder: Sarah Boyack Minister for Transport and the Environment
- Formation: 19 May 1999
- Salary: £106,185 per annum (2024) (including £72,196 MSP salary)
- Website: www.gov.scot

The Minister for Agriculture, Marine & the Islands is a junior ministerial post in the Scottish Government established in February 2024.

== Overview ==
=== Responsibilities ===
The Minister for Agriculture and Connectivity supports the Cabinet Secretary for Climate Action and Rural Affairs and the Cabinet Secretary for Economy, Tourism and Transport.

Specific responsibilities of the post are:

==== Rural ====
- agriculture
- animal health and welfare
- wildlife management and crime
- natural resources and peatland
- crofting
- rural portfolio impacts of Brexit and Retained EU Law Act
- allotments and community food growing

==== Transport ====
- aviation and air services (including HIAL)
- island connectivity
- bus services and concessionary fares
- Scottish canals

== List of office holders ==
=== Minister for Agriculture and Connectivity ===
Name	Portrait	Entered office	Left office	Party	First Minister
Jim Fairlie		20 Feb 2024	incumbent	Scottish National Party	Humza Yousaf

== See also ==
- Scottish Parliament
