= PHACE West =

Scottish HIV/AIDS awareness organisation

Project for HIV and AIDS Care and Education (PHACE) West was Scottish HIV and AIDS awareness organisation that was active in the West of Scotland between 1995 and 2006.

== History ==
PHACE West was founded in November 1994 by Ken Cowan following changes in the Scottish HIV voluntary sector, and the following year attracted funding from four West of Scotland health boards. There was a widespread perception of an East Coast bias in the management of the predominant Scottish AIDS organisation Scottish AIDS Monitor, and inadequate West Coast services. A number of SAM staff joined PHACE West, including its director Maureen Moore (AIDS activist).

The new organisation had a high-profile launch party in May 1995 at Glasgow's Tunnel nightclub, featuring a performance by Dannii Minogue. In 2000 it expanded by opening an Aberdeen office, and becoming a national organisation, PHACE Scotland. In 2006 the organisation became part of the Terrence Higgins Trust, as its parent organisation PHACE Scotland completed a merger with the UK's longest established HIV charity, allowing THT Scotland to provide services in Greater Glasgow and Clyde, Argyll, Ayrshire Arran, Lanarkshire, Grampian and Highland NHS Scotland board areas.

== Activities ==
PHACE West provided a welfare rights service, Buddy Support Service and Night Owl crisis line, counselling, and condoms by post for people in rural areas. They ran the HAVEN, a drop in space at Ruchill Hospital. They also produced publications and websites on safer sex aimed at gay men, distributed condoms in LGBT venues, and ran the youth group Bi-G-Les for under-25s.

== Prosecution under Section 28 ==
In May 2000, Glasgow City Council halted funding to LGBT groups as local resident Sheena Strain (with the backing of the Christian Institute) took them to the Court of Session, objecting to her council tax being used for what she viewed as the promotion of homosexuality, in contravention of Section 28. In particular she objected to the funding of PHACE West for producing and distributing a safe sex guide 'Gay Sex Now', which she considered pornographic. The Christian Institute's publication "The Case for Keeping Section 28" (dating from January 2000) shows that PHACE West was one of a number of publicly funded organisations supporting LGBT people that they intended to target. In July of the same year, Mrs Sheen dropped the case, having reached agreement that the council would send a covering letter to grant recipients stating "You will not spend these monies for the purpose of promoting homosexuality nor shall they be used for the publication of any material which promotes homosexuality." The council had been intending to defend using the argument that PHACE West's principal activity was preventing the spread of HIV/AIDS, so was not promoting homosexuality. In the meantime the Scottish Parliament had passed the Ethical Standards in Public Life etc. (Scotland) Act 2000, which repealed the law. Subsequently, funding was restored to the LGBT organisations affected.
