= Perth and Kinross (constituency) =

UK Parliament constituency (1983–1997)

- Former county constituency for the House of Commons
- Subdivision: Perthshire
- Major settlements: Perth

1983–1997
- Seats: One
- Created from: Perth & East Perthshire, Kinross and West Perthshire, Dundee West and Angus South
- Replaced by: Perth, Ochil, Angus, Dundee West and North Tayside

Perth and Kinross was a county constituency of the House of Commons of the Parliament of the United Kingdom from 1983 to 1997. It elected one Member of Parliament (MP) by the first past the post system of election.

== Boundaries ==
The Perth and Kinross constituency was largely a replacement for the Perth and East Perthshire constituency. As first used in the 1983 general election, it covered part of the region of Tayside, which had been created in 1975, under the Local Government (Scotland) Act 1973, as a region of three districts, including the district of Perth and Kinross. In 1997 the Perth and Kinross constituency was largely replaced by the Perth constituency.

== Members of Parliament ==
Election	Member	Party	Notes
1983	Sir Nicholas Fairbairn	Conservative	Previously MP for Kinross and West Perthshire from October 1974. Died in office February 1995
May 1995 by-election	Roseanna Cunningham	SNP	Subsequently MP for Perth from 1997
1997	constituency abolished: see Perth		

== Election results ==
=== Elections of the 1980s ===
General election 1983: Perth and Kinross
Party	Candidate	Votes	%	±%
Conservative	Nicholas Fairbairn	17,888	40.2	−3.6
SNP	Douglas Crawford	11,155	25.1	−7.5
Liberal	John Coutts	10,997	24.7	+15.2
Labour	Alistair Stuart	4,414	9.9	−4.2
Majority		6,733	15.2	
Turnout		44,454	72.3	
Conservative win (new seat)				

General election 1987: Perth and Kinross
Party	Candidate	Votes	%	±%
Conservative	Nicholas Fairbairn	18,716	39.6	−0.6
SNP	Jim Fairlie	13,040	27.6	+2.5
Liberal	Stewart Donaldson	7,969	16.9	−7.8
Labour	Jack McConnell	7,490	15.9	+6.0
Majority		5,676	12.0	−3.2
Turnout		47,215	74.4	+2.1
Conservative hold		Swing		

=== Elections of the 1990s ===
General election 1992: Perth and Kinross
Party	Candidate	Votes	%	±%
Conservative	Nicholas Fairbairn	20,195	40.2	+0.6
SNP	Roseanna Cunningham	18,101	36.0	+8.4
Labour	Mervyn Rolfe	6,267	12.4	−3.5
Liberal Democrats	Malcolm Black	5,714	11.4	−5.5
Majority		2,094	4.2	−7.8
Turnout		47,950	76.9	+2.5
Conservative hold		Swing		

By-election 1995: Perth and Kinross
Party	Candidate	Votes	%	±%
SNP	Roseanna Cunningham	16,931	40.4	+4.4
Labour	Douglas Alexander	9,620	22.9	+10.5
Conservative	John Godfrey	8,990	21.4	−18.8
Liberal Democrats	Veronica Linklater	4,952	11.8	+0.4
Monster Raving Loony	Screaming Lord Sutch	586	1.4	New
UKIP	Vivian T. Linacre	504	1.2	New
Green	Robin Harper	223	0.5	New
Scottish Conservatory and Unionist	Michael A. Halford	88	0.2	New
Natural Law	Gary D. Black	54	0.1	New
Majority		7,311	17.5	N/A
Turnout		41.948	61.7	−14.8
SNP gain from Conservative		Swing	+11.6	
