= Jim Fairlie (MSP) =

Scottish National Party politician

Jim Fairlie MSP
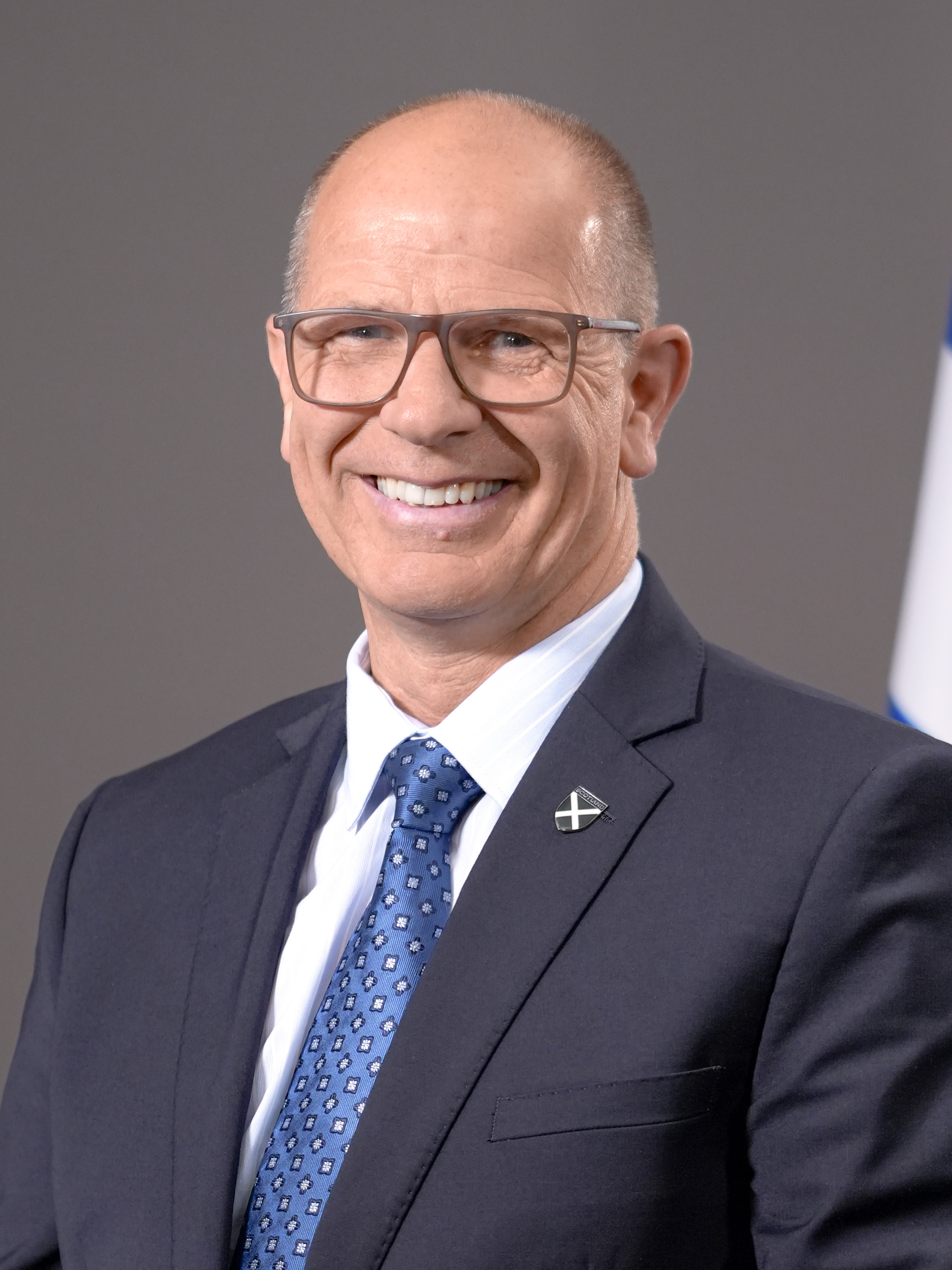
- Official portrait, 2026

Minister for Agriculture and Connectivity
- Incumbent
- Assumed office 20 February 2024
- First Minister: Humza Yousaf; John Swinney
- Preceded by: Fiona Hyslop (Transport)

Member of the Scottish Parliament for Perthshire South and Kinross-shire
- Incumbent
- Assumed office 6 May 2021
- Preceded by: Roseanna Cunningham
- Majority: 5,061 (13.9%)

Personal details
- Born: James McGregor Fairlie
- Party: Scottish National Party

James McGregor Fairlie is a Scottish National Party (SNP) politician who has been Minister for Agriculture, Marine, and the Islands since May 2026. Fairlie has also served as the Member of the Scottish Parliament (MSP) for Perthshire South and Kinross-shire since May 2021.

== Early life ==
In 1996, as a sheep farmer, Fairlie launched Perth Farmers' Market. His father Jim Fairlie was a senior member of the SNP for several decades and stood as a candidate without success in several elections; his brother Andrew (died 2019) was a renowned chef.

== Political career ==
Fairlie was a co-founder of Farmers4Yes, a pro-Scottish independence campaign group.

In September 2020, Fairlie announced his intention to seek election to the Scottish Parliament.

On 8 May 2021 he was elected as a Member of the Scottish Parliament (MSP) for Perthshire South and Kinross-shire. In February 2023, he issued a statement explaining that he would continue to support Kate Forbes in her campaign to become leader of the SNP, despite disagreeing with her views on social political issues like marriage equality and abortion rights.

In February 2024, the First Minister announced that Fairlie would join the Scottish Government as Minister for Agriculture and Connectivity. The Scottish Parliament voted on 20 February to approve the appointment.

In the 2026 Scottish Parliament election, Fairlie successfully ran for re-election, almost tripling his majority in Perthshire South and Kinross-shire.

In May 2026, Fairlie was appointed Minister for Agriculture, Marine and the Islands by First Minister John Swinney.

Political offices
New office	Minister for Agriculture and Connectivity; 2024-	Succeeded by Incumbent
