= Veronica Linklater, Baroness Linklater of Butterstone =

British life peer (1943–2022)

The Right Honourable The Baroness Linklater of Butterstone

Member of the House of Lords
- Lord Temporal
- Life peerage 1 November 1997 – 12 February 2016

Personal details
- Born: 15 April 1943 Meikleour House, Scotland
- Died: 15 December 2022 (aged 79) Dunkeld, Scotland
- Party: Liberal Democrats

Veronica Linklater, Baroness Linklater of Butterstone (née Lyle; 15 April 1943 – 15 December 2022) was a British Liberal Democrat politician and member of the House of Lords. Her career indicated her interests in children's welfare, education and special needs, and prison reform.

== Life and career ==
Linklater was born at Meikleour House, Scotland on 15 April 1943, the daughter of Lieutenant-Colonel Archibald Michael Lyle and Hon. Elizabeth Sinclair, younger daughter of the former Leader of the Liberal Party Archibald Sinclair, 1st Viscount Thurso. Her first cousin, John Sinclair, 3rd Viscount Thurso, was an elected Liberal Democrat MP for the seat of Caithness, Sutherland and Easter Ross. She was educated at Cranborne Chase School, a former boarding independent school for girls situated at New Wardour Castle, near Tisbury, Wiltshire, followed by the Universities of Sussex and London. In 1967, she married the journalist Magnus Linklater; they had three children, two sons and one daughter.

In 1967, she became a Child Care Officer for the London Borough of Tower Hamlets, and between 1970 and 1985, she became governor to three Islington schools. From 1971 to 1977, she co-founded the Visitors' Centre at Pentonville Prison, and her continuing interest in this field led to her involvement with the Winchester Prison Project, Prison Reform Trust from 1981 to 1982. She was a trustee of the Esmée Fairbairn Foundation.

In 1992, she turned her parents mansion house in Butterstone into a school for children with special needs called the New School. She was inspired to set up the school after struggling to find an appropriate school for her daughter, Freya, who has cerebral palsy and struggled with mainstream education.

She stood for the Liberal Democrats in the 1995 Perth and Kinross by-election, finishing fourth. She was created a life peer as Baroness Linklater of Butterstone, of Riemore in Perth and Kinross, in the 1997 Prime Minister's Resignation Honours. She retired in February 2016 following the House of Lords Reform Act 2014.

Linklater later suffered from Alzheimer's disease. She died of a heart attack at home in Dunkeld, on 15 December 2022, at the age of 79.

== Arms ==
Coat of arms of Veronica Linklater, Baroness Linklater of Butterstone

Notes
Linklater matriculated arms at the Lyon Office in 1999.
Crest
A book expanded Gules binding and fore-edges Or charged with a star of six rays waved Argent.
Escutcheon
Gules fretty Or surmounted of a galley oars in saltire sails furled Sable flagged Gules the sails charged with a crescent Or a bordure Or.
Supporters
Dexter a cock Or combed Gules sinister a shelldrake wings addorsed Proper.
Motto
"An I May".

== Sources ==
- Profile, hansard.millbanksystems.com; accessed 20 March 2014.
- Biography, parliament.uk; accessed 20 March 2014.
