= ScotsGay =

Bi-monthly magazine published in Scotland for the lesbian, gay and bisexual community

- Editor: Martin Walker (from 2006)
- Former editors: John Hein (1994–2006)
- Staff writers: Taylor Crockett; Andi Watson; David Jackson; Stevie Harkin
- Frequency: Bi-monthly
- Founder: John Hein
- First issue: 1 December 1994; 31 years ago
- Country: Scotland, United Kingdom
- Based in: Edinburgh
- Language: English
- Website: scotsgay.co.uk

ScotsGay was a bi-monthly magazine published in Scotland for the lesbian, gay and bisexual community. Although principally a "print first" publication, readers could access and download textfiles of all issues and (from 2005) PDF documents of the whole issues. The website is no longer active.

The magazine was launched by John Hein, a former editor of Gay Scotland, in December 1994. Hein remained editor and publisher until issue 69 (April 2006), after which Martin Walker became editor while Hein remained as publisher. By the time the final issue of ScotsGay was published in October 2016, Hein had reassumed the editorial role.

Issues of ScotsGay primarily featured ‘Scene’ reports by regular columnists from Scotland’s cities, as well as comprehensive listings of LGBT+ groups, venues, etc. Issues also carried advertising, which contributed to the magazine’s production and distribution costs; this ranged from specialist telephone lines to local “Scene” venues.

The magazine was put on hiatus in 2016/17 after John Hein suffered a minor stroke. The website was subsequently updated with promises of ScotsGay returning during the summer of 2017 but this did not happen.

In the summer of 2019, Taylor Crockett – previously responsible for the publication’s growing coverage of the Edinburgh Festival Fringe, was announced as the magazine’s new editor with a relaunch scheduled for April 2020. Again, the magazine did not appear.

John Hein died in December 2020. As of April 2026, there has been no indication of anyone attempting to relaunch ScotsGay as a print magazine. However, former contributor Brett Herriot successfully launched a website, ScotsGay Arts, to continue and expand on the print publication's arts coverage.

== See also ==
- List of magazines published in Scotland
