= North Tayside (Scottish Parliament constituency) =

Region or constituency of the Scottish Parliament

- Former county constituency for the Scottish Parliament
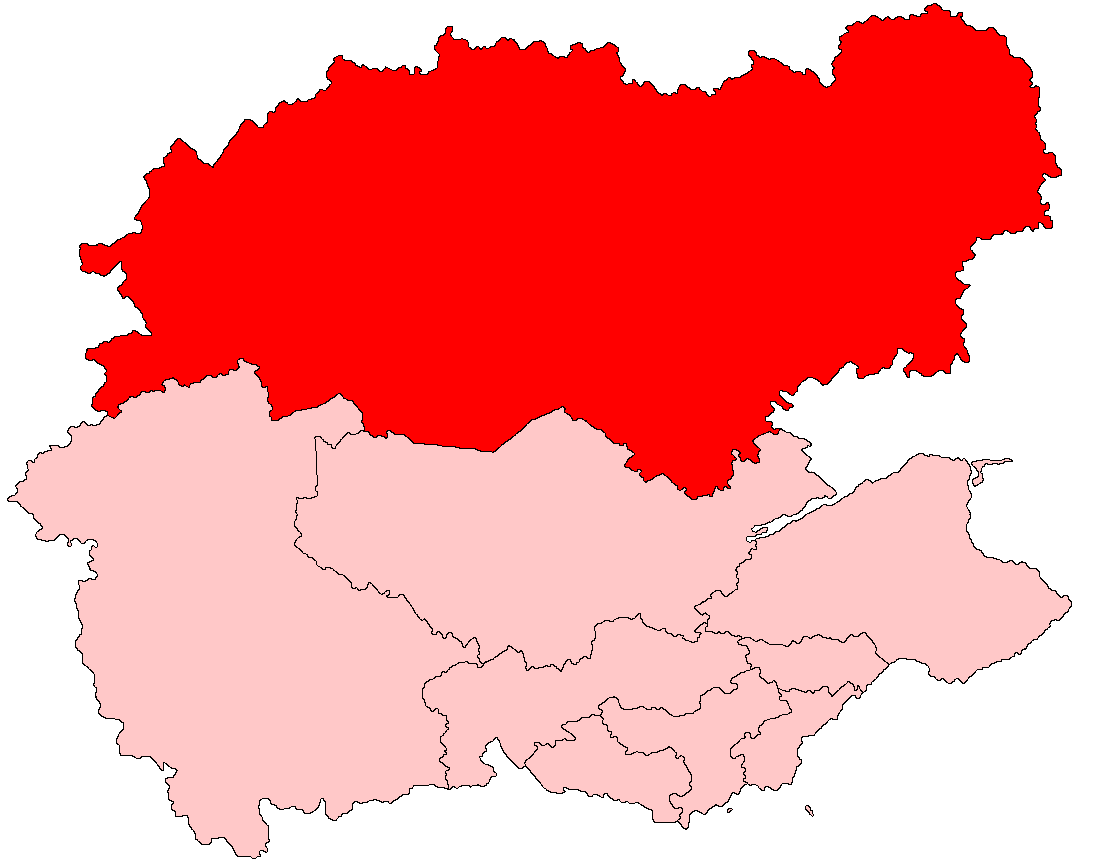

- North Tayside shown within the Mid Scotland and Fife electoral region and the region shown within Scotland

Former constituency
- Created: 1999
- Abolished: 2011
- Council area: Angus (part); Perth and Kinross (part)
- Replaced by: Angus North & Mearns, Angus South, Perthshire North

North Tayside was a constituency of the Scottish Parliament. Under the additional-member electoral system used for elections to the Scottish Parliament, it elected one Member of the Scottish Parliament (MSP) by the plurality (first past the post) method of election. It was also one of nine constituencies in the Mid Scotland and Fife electoral region, which elected seven additional members, in addition to the nine constituency MSPs, to produce a form of proportional representation for the region as a whole.

== Electoral region ==
The other eight constituencies of the mid Scotland and Fife Region were: Dunfermline East, Dunfermline West, Fife Central, Fife North East, Kirkcaldy, Ochil, Perth and Stirling. The region covered all of the Clackmannanshire council area, all of the Fife council area, all of the Perth and Kinross council area, all of the Stirling council area and parts of the Angus council area.

== Constituency boundaries and council areas ==
The constituency was created at the same time as the Scottish Parliament, in 1999, with the name and boundaries of a pre-existing House of Commons constituency. For the 2005 United Kingdom general election Scottish Westminster constituencies were generally replaced with new larger constituencies. For representation in the House of Commons, the area of the North Tayside constituency was divided between the Perth and North Perthshire and the Angus constituencies.

North Tayside covered a northern portion of the Perth and Kinross council area and a northern portion of the Angus council area. The rest of the Perth and Kinross council area was covered by the Mid Scotland and Fife constituencies of Perth and Ochil and the North East Scotland constituency of Angus. The Perth constituency was entirely within the Perth and Kinross council area, south of the Tayside North constituency. The Ochil constituency covered a south-eastern portion of the Perth and Kinross council area, the Clackmannanshire council area, and a south-eastern portion of the Stirling council area.

The rest of the Angus council area was covered by the Angus constituency. The Angus constituency covered a small eastern portion of the Perth and Kinross council, a southern portion of the Angus council area, and north-western and north-eastern portions of the Dundee City council area.

== Characteristics of the constituency ==
The constituency was a relatively prosperous, largely rural, Lowland seat, on the fringe of the Highlands, with successful livestock farming, fruit-growing and tourism interests, a combination of small towns and rich agricultural land, with relatively low unemployment. It included the towns of Pitlochry, Forfar and Blairgowrie. The south-western area, near the town of Perth, is the most populous.

== Member of the Scottish Parliament ==
John Swinney had represented the constituency for the SNP since the first Scottish election in 1999. He was SNP leader from 2000 to 2004. He has served as SNP leader again and First Minister of Scotland since 2024.

Election	Member	Party
1999	John Swinney	Scottish National Party
2011	constituency abolished: replaced by Angus North & Mearns, Angus South, and Perthshire North	

== Election results ==
2007 Scottish Parliament election: North Tayside
Party	Candidate	Votes	%	±%
SNP	John Swinney	18,281	51.6	+6.7
Conservative	Murdo Fraser	10,697	30.2	−1.2
Labour	Michael Marra	3,243	9.2	−1.4
Liberal Democrats	James Taylor	3,175	9.0	−0.6
Majority		7,584	21.4	+7.9
Turnout		35.395	57.1	+3.9
SNP hold		Swing	+4.0	

2003 Scottish Parliament election: North Tayside
Party	Candidate	Votes	%	±%
SNP	John Swinney	14,969	44.9	+0.8
Conservative	Murdo Fraser	10,466	31.4	−1.7
Labour	Gordon MacRae	3,527	10.6	−4.4
Liberal Democrats	Bob Forrest	3,206	9.6	+1.9
Scottish Socialist	Rosie Adams	941	2.8	New
Scottish People's	George Ashe	234	0.7	New
Majority		4,503	13.5	+2.5
Turnout		33,343	53.2	
SNP hold		Swing	+0.8	

1999 Scottish Parliament election: North Tayside
Party	Candidate	Votes	%	±%
SNP	John Swinney	16,786	44.11	N/A
Conservative	Murdo Fraser	12,594	33.09	N/A
Labour	Marion Dingwall	5,727	15.05	N/A
Liberal Democrats	Peter Regent	2,948	7.75	N/A
Majority		4,192	11.02	N/A
Turnout		38,055		
SNP win (new seat)				
