= 1995 Perth and Kinross by-election =

UK parliamentary by-election

- 25 May 1995

The Perth and Kinross seat in the House of Commons. Elected by simple majority using first past the post. Triggered by death of incumbent
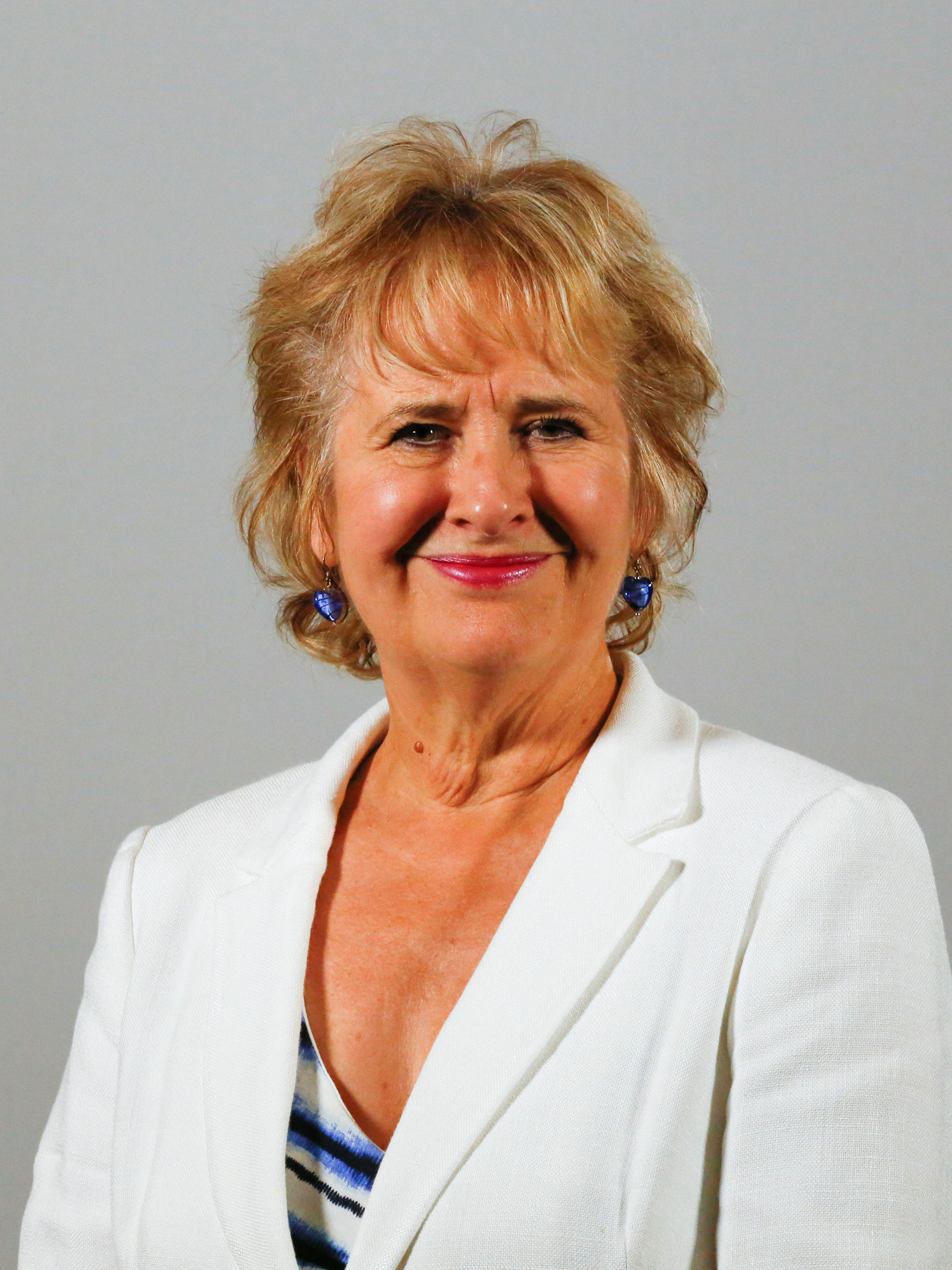

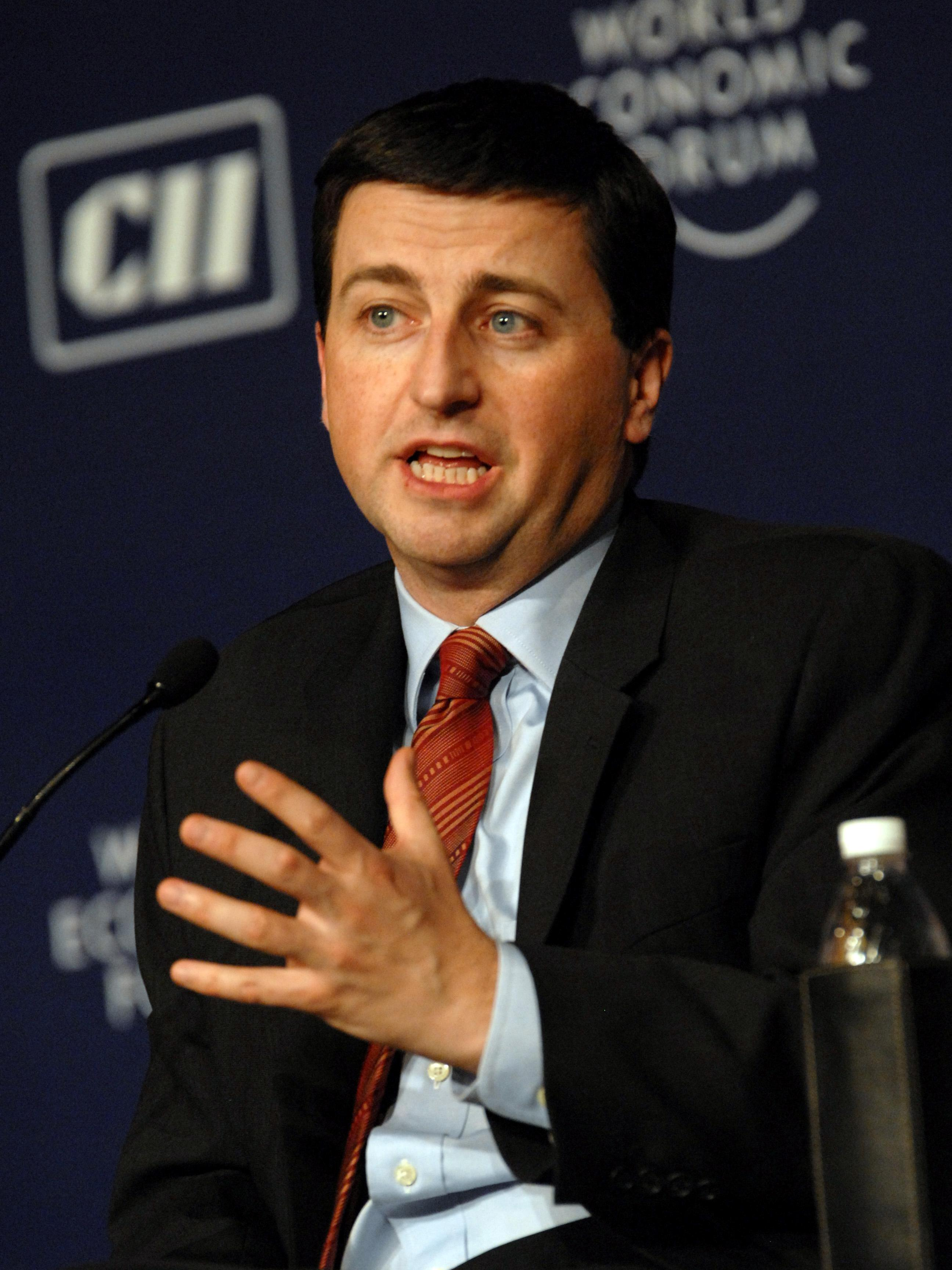
	First party	Second party
Candidate	Roseanna Cunningham	Douglas Alexander
Party	SNP	Labour
Popular vote	16,931	9,620
Percentage	40.4%	22.9%
Swing	▲4.4pp	▲10.5pp
	Third party	Fourth party
Candidate	John Godfrey	Veronica Linklater
Party	Conservative	Liberal Democrats
Popular vote	8,990	4,952
Percentage	21.4%	11.8%
Swing	▼18.7pp	▲0.7pp
MP before election
Nicholas Fairbairn
Conservative
Elected MP
Roseanna Cunningham
SNP

A by-election for the UK Parliament constituency of Perth and Kinross in Scotland was held on 25 May 1995, following the death of Conservative MP Sir Nicholas Fairbairn on 19 February of that year.

The result was a Scottish National Party gain from the Conservatives.

== Result ==
Perth and Kinross by-election, 1995
Party	Candidate	Votes	%	±%
SNP	Roseanna Cunningham	16,931	40.4	+4.4
Labour	Douglas Alexander	9,620	22.9	+10.5
Conservative	John Godfrey	8,990	21.4	−18.7
Liberal Democrats	Veronica Linklater	4,952	11.8	+0.4
Monster Raving Loony	Screaming Lord Sutch	586	1.4	New
UKIP	Vivian Linacre	504	1.2	New
Green	Robin Harper	223	0.5	New
Scottish Conservatory and Unionist	Michael Halford	88	0.2	New
Natural Law	Gary Black	54	0.1	New
Majority		7,311	17.5	N/A
Turnout		41.948	62.1	−14.8
SNP gain from Conservative		Swing	+11.6	

== Previous result ==
General election 1992: Perth and Kinross
Party	Candidate	Votes	%	±%
Conservative	Nicholas Fairbairn	20,195	40.2	+0.6
SNP	Roseanna Cunningham	18,101	36.0	+8.4
Labour	Mervyn Rolfe	6,267	12.4	−3.5
Liberal Democrats	Malcolm Black	5,714	11.4	−5.5
Majority		2,094	4.2	−7.8
Turnout		47,950	76.9	+2.5
Conservative hold		Swing		

== See also ==
- Scottish Westminster constituencies
- Lists of United Kingdom by-elections
