= Lothian Gay and Lesbian Switchboard =

Scotland's first LGBT helpline and charity

Lothian Gay and Lesbian Switchboard Logo - 1994

The Lothian Gay and Lesbian Switchboard (LGLS) opened on 2 March 1974, and was the United Kingdom's first gay helpline and Scotland's first gay charity. Initially called the Edinburgh Befriending Service, it was established one day prior to the London Lesbian and Gay Switchboard, known as Switchboard (UK).

It was an activist led mental and physical health support service for LGBT people in the Lothians and beyond, created at a time when homosexuality was still illegal in Scotland (it was partially decriminalised in England and Wales by the Sexual Offences Act of 1967, and was decriminalised by the Scottish Criminal Justice Act of 1980, which came into effect in 1981, and in Northern Ireland by the Homosexual Offences (Northern Ireland) Order 1982).

One of its founding members was noted author Iona McGregor.

Throughout the 1980s and 1990s, the Switchboard was actively involved in advocacy, education and campaigning around HIV/AIDS in Edinburgh.

After 35 years, the Lothian Gay and Lesbian Switchboard passed the running of the resource to the LGBT Centre for Health and Wellbeing in 2010.

In 2020, University of Edinburgh were awarded a grant of £54,548 by the Wellcome Trust Research Resources, to catalogue and promote the Lothian Gay and Lesbian Switchboard archives, held by Lothian Health Services Archive, which sit within the University of Edinburgh's Centre for Research Collections. This project is called, Speaking Out.

== See also ==
- LGBT rights in the United Kingdom
