= Outright Scotland =

Scottish LGBT rights organisation

- Formation: 9 May 1969; 57 years ago
- Founder: Ian Dunn
- Founded at: Glasgow, United Kingdom
- Location: Edinburgh, United Kingdom
- Coordinates: 55.957660°N 3.188780°W
- Formerly called: Scottish Minorities Group

Outright Scotland is an LGBT rights organisation based in Edinburgh, Scotland. Founded as the Scottish Minorities Group (SMG) in 1969, and later known as the Scottish Homosexual Rights Group (SHRG), it was the country's first LGBT rights organisation. The group ran as a self-help organisation working for the rights of homosexual men and women, and aimed to provide counselling, work for law reform, and provide meeting places for lesbians and gay men.

== History ==
The group's first meeting in January 1969 was organised by Ian Dunn at his parents' home in Glasgow. Six people attended. The meeting was organised in response to England and Wales' partial decriminalisation of adult homosexual relationships, through the Sexual Offences Act 1967. The act did not apply to Scotland, and it was hoped that through the group, members could work on law reform within Scotland.

The group officially launched on the 9 May 1969, at an open meeting in the Protestant Chaplaincy Centre of Glasgow University. Around 25 men and women were in attendance. SMG meetings moved to the basement of the Catholic Chaplaincy in Edinburgh with the support of its chaplain Father Anthony Ross in August 1969.

A monthly newsletter, SMG News, was started in January 1971. In the same year the group organised the Cobweb disco, which was Scotland's first gay disco. The SMG Glasgow Women's Group was launched along with its magazine Gayzette.

In 1972, SMG started the Edinburgh Gay Switchboard. SMG organised the International Gay Rights Congress held in the Student's Union of Edinburgh University from 18–22 December 1974. It concluded with a disco which ended with John and Yoko Lennon's "Happy Christmas War Is over", by this time there was a positive feeling that the fight for gay equality was almost over too. Around 400 people attended the event and it led to the setting up of the International Gay Association in 1978.

In 1974 the group relocated to Broughton Street, Edinburgh. The property was bigger, and SMG ran a coffee shop, a bookshop, and their befriending service at the new location. In the late 1970s a gay youth group was formed, following concerns about the legality of hosting gay teenagers at the centre. Instead, they met weekly at the Edinburgh University Roman Catholic Chaplaincy.

In October 1974 the Paedophile Information Exchange, a pro-paedophile activist group was founded as a special interest group within the Scottish Minorities Group. SMG founder Ian Dunn was among the founding members of PIE.

In 1977, the Glasgow Gay Centre was opened in Sauchiehall Street, after the premises was secured by then chairwoman Sheila MacAskill.

In 1978 the group renamed, to become the Scottish Homosexual Rights Group (SHRG). Following the name change, the newsletter, SMG News, was renamed to become Gay Scotland.

In 1980, Robin Cook's amendment to the 1980 Criminal Justice (Scotland) Bill partially decriminalised gay sex between men over 21. This allowed a commercial scene to develop and Bennets Nightclub opened in Glasgow in 1981. There was subsequently less demand for community facilities. At its peak in 1982, SHRG had 1200 members. However, the Glasgow Gay Centre closed in 1982.

In 1988 the SHRG organised its first Lark in the Park in Edinburgh’s Princes Street gardens, the event was the precursor to Pride Scotia, which began in 1995.

In 1992, SHRG changed its name to Outright Scotland.

== Today ==
Latterly focusing on work around the Scottish Parliament, Scottish Government and Scottish Public Institutions such as the National Health Service, Police and Justice System, Outright Scotland is currently dormant with much of their former role being taken by the Equality Network and Stonewall Scotland.

== See also ==
- LGBT rights in the United Kingdom
- List of LGBT rights organisations
