= Findlay shadow cabinet =

Scottish shadow cabinet since 2024

Findlay Shadow Cabinet
- Shadow Cabinet of Scotland
- 2024 –
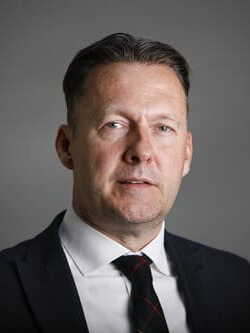
- Findlay in 2026
- Date formed: 8 October 2024

People and organisations
- Leader of the Opposition: Russell Findlay
- Member party: Scottish Conservatives

History
- Incoming formation: 2024 Scottish Conservatives leadership election
- Outgoing formation: 2026 Scottish Parliament election
- Legislature term: 6th Scottish Parliament
- Predecessor: Shadow Cabinet of Douglas Ross

The Shadow Cabinet of Russell Findlay was formed on 8 October 2024, after the election of Russell Findlay as Leader of the Scottish Conservative Party on 27 September 2024. While there is no Official Opposition in Holyrood, Findlay, as leader of the largest party not in government, acted as the Leader of the Opposition until May 2026.

== Background and formation ==
Findlay won the 2024 Scottish Conservatives leadership election, succeeding Douglas Ross who stood down after the 2024 general election.

Appointments to the Shadow Cabinet and frontbench were reported as being expected to be made after the Conservative party conference. Rachael Hamilton was appointed the Deputy Leader on 28 September. Findlay appointed his Shadow Cabinet on 8 October. It was confirmed that Craig Hoy would continue as the party chair for an interim period.

== Shadow Cabinet (2026–present) ==
Second Findlay Shadow Cabinet
| Shadow Minister Constituency | Portfolio | Term |
Shadow Cabinet Secretaries
| Russell Findlay MSP for West Scotland | Leader of the Scottish Conservatives | 2024–present |
| Rachael Hamilton MSP for Ettrick, Roxburgh and Berwickshire | Deputy Leader Business and Tourism | 2024–present 2026–present |
| Craig Hoy MSP for Dumfriesshire | Finance and Social Security | 2024–present |
| Miles Briggs MSP for Edinburgh and Lothians East | Health and Care | 2026–present |
| Murdo Fraser MSP for Mid Scotland and Fife | Public Service Reform and Culture | 2026–present |
| Liam Kerr MSP for North East Scotland | Energy | 2026–present |
| Meghan Gallacher MSP for Central Scotland | Education and Equalities | 2026–present |
| Tim Eagle MSP for Highlands and Islands | Housing and Transport | 2026–present |
| Stephen Kerr MSP for Mid Scotland and Fife | Justice | 2026–present |
| Finlay Carson MSP for Galloway and West Dumfries | Rural Affairs and Environment | 2026–present |
| Alexander Burnett MSP for Aberdeenshire West | Local Government | 2026–present |

== Shadow Cabinet (2024–2026) ==
Findlay Shadow Cabinet
| Shadow Minister Constituency | Portfolio | Term |
Shadow Cabinet Secretaries
| Russell Findlay MSP for West Scotland | Leader of the Scottish Conservatives | 2024–present |
| Rachael Hamilton MSP for Ettrick, Roxburgh and Berwickshire | Deputy Leader | 2024–present |
| Craig Hoy MSP for South Scotland | Finance and Local Government | 2024–present |
| Murdo Fraser MSP for Mid Scotland and Fife | Business, Economy, Tourism and Culture | 2022–present |
| Sandesh Gulhane MSP for Glasgow | Health and Social Care | 2021–present |
| Miles Briggs MSP for Lothian | Education and Skills | 2024–present |
| Douglas Lumsden MSP for North East Scotland | Net Zero and Energy | 2022–present |
| Liam Kerr MSP for North East Scotland | Justice | 2024–present |
| Liz Smith MSP for Mid Scotland and Fife | Social Security | 2024–present |
| Meghan Gallacher MSP for Central Scotland | Housing | 2024–present |
| Sue Webber MSP for Lothian | Transport | 2024–present |
| Tim Eagle MSP for Highlands and Islands | Rural Affairs, Land Reform and Fishing | 2024–present |
| Alexander Burnett MSP for Aberdeenshire West | Chief Whip | 2024–present |

=== Junior shadow ministers ===
Shadow junior ministers
| Position | Shadow minister |
|---|---|
| Deputy chair of the Scottish Conservatives Shadow Minister for Employment and Investment | Pam Gosal MSP |
| Deputy chief whip Shadow Minister for Victims and Community Safety | Sharon Dowey MSP |
| Shadow Minister for Public Health, Social Care, Mental Wellbeing and Sport | Brian Whittle MSP |
| Shadow Minister for Drugs, Alcohol and Women's Health | Annie Wells MSP |
| Shadow Minister for Local Government and Public Finance | Alexander Stewart MSP |
| Shadow Minister for Children and Young People | Roz McCall MSP |
| Shadow Minister for Equalities | Tess White MSP |
| Shadow Minister for Social Justice | Jeremy Balfour MSP |
| Minister for Public Health and Women's Health | Jenni Minto MSP |
| Minister for Agriculture, Connectivity and Islands | Jamie Halcro Johnston MSP |
| Shadow Minister for Veterans | Edward Mountain MSP |
