= 2024 Scottish Conservatives leadership election =

2024 Scottish Conservative Party leadership election
- 8 August – 27 September 2024
- Turnout: 60%
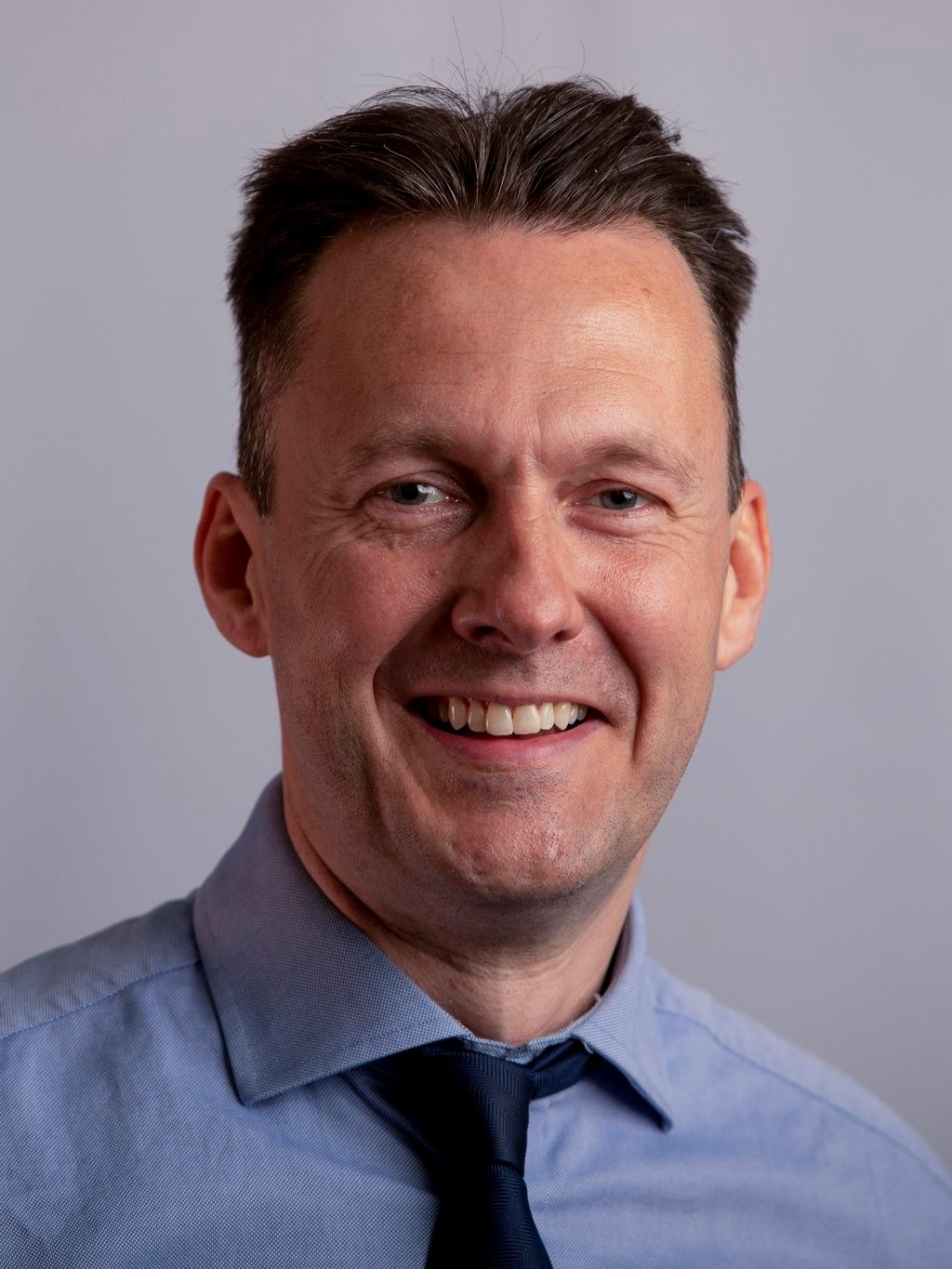

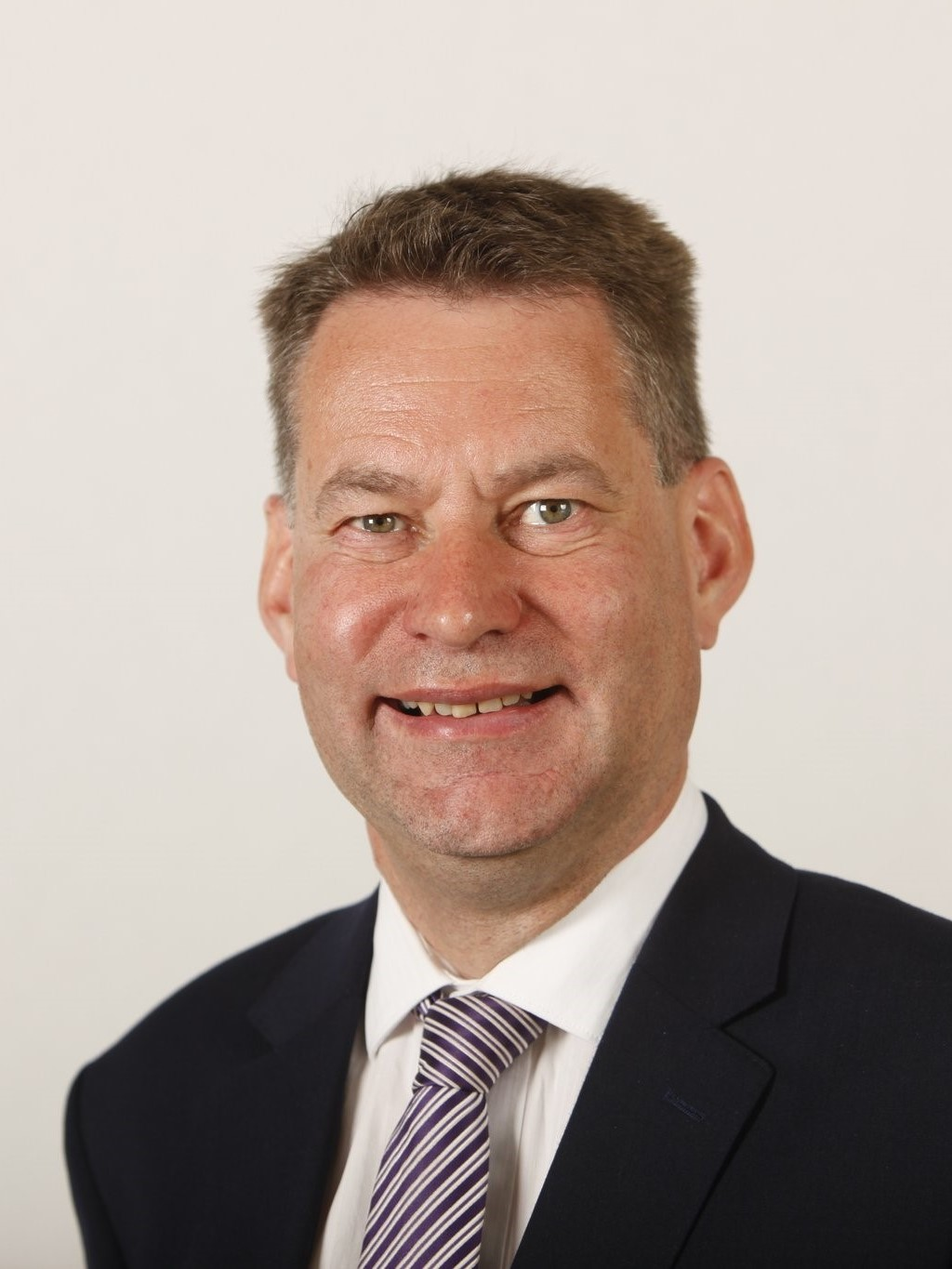

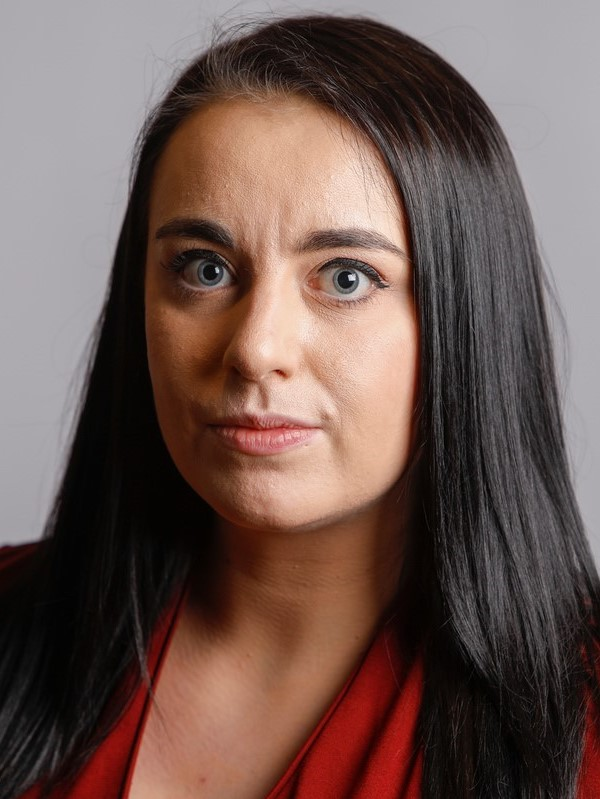
Candidate	Russell Findlay	Murdo Fraser	Meghan Gallacher
Popular vote	2,565	1,187	403
Percentage	61.73%	28.57%	9.7%
Leader before election
Douglas Ross
Elected Leader
Russell Findlay

The 2024 Scottish Conservatives leadership election took place on 27 September 2024 after Douglas Ross announced his resignation on 10 June. Russell Findlay won the election and became Leader of the Scottish Conservative Party.

== Background ==
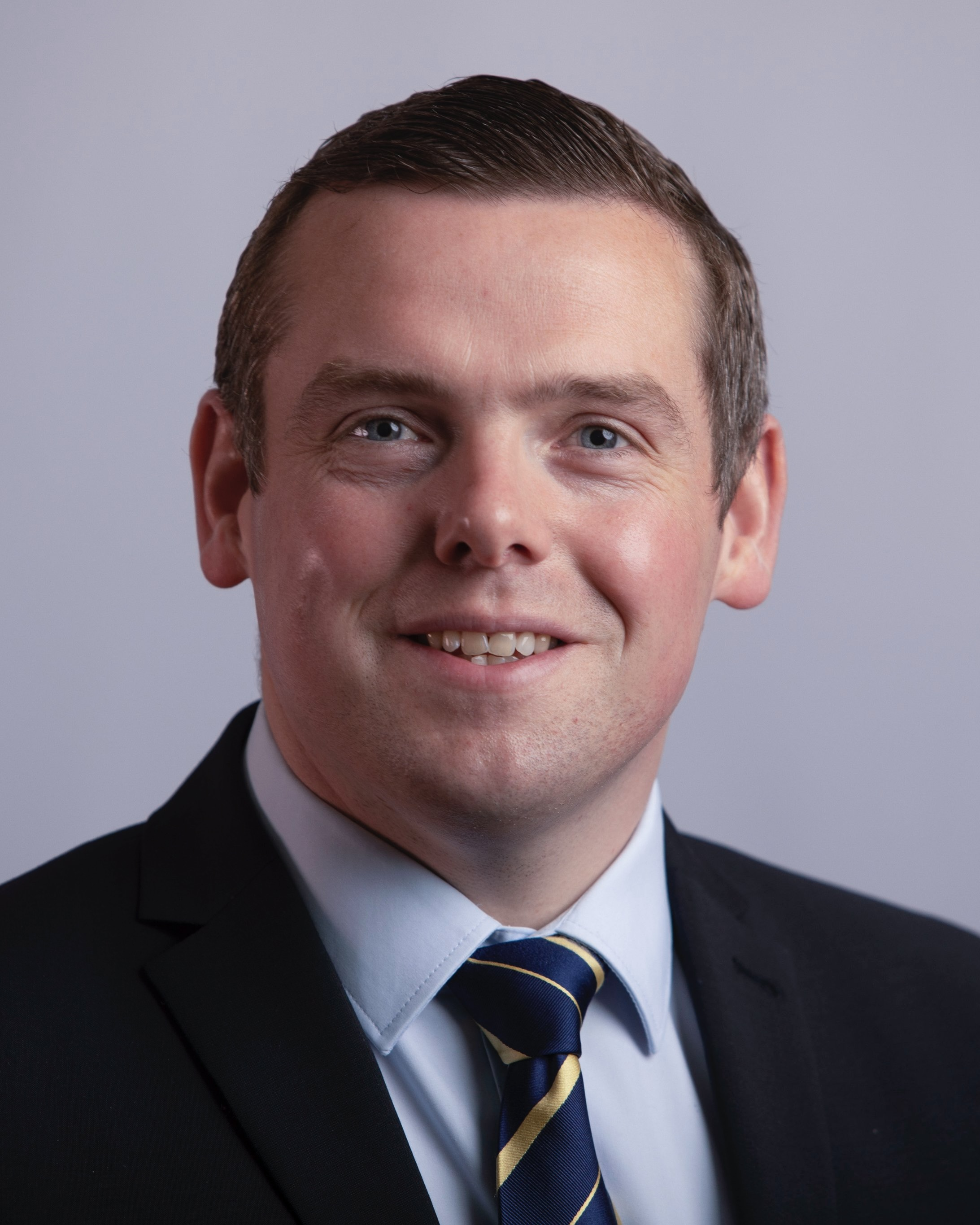
Douglas Ross announced his resignation on 10 June 2024

Douglas Ross was elected leader of the Scottish Conservatives unopposed in August 2020 after his predecessor Jackson Carlaw resigned. In the 2021 Scottish Parliament election the Conservatives remained the second largest party with the same number of MSPs as at the previous election. Ross was elected as an MSP, having already been an MP. He kept both jobs, donating his MSP salary to charity.

The Conservative prime minister Rishi Sunak called the 2024 United Kingdom general election to be held on 4 July. Ross initially said that he would stand down as an MP. David Duguid, a former minister who was recovering from spinal surgery, had been expected to run for re-election as the Conservative candidate for Aberdeenshire North and Moray East. On 5 June, he was deselected by the party "on health grounds". The next day, Ross was announced as the candidate. He initially said he would continue as MP, MSP and party leader, and that the Scottish Conservatives management board had made the decision to replace Duguid. The chair of the Scottish Conservatives said that Ross, who sits on the board, had not been part of discussions about Duguid. Duguid said he had wanted to stand, that no members of the board had visited him in hospital, and that the board was not accurately describing his condition.

Ross was separately criticised for expense claims he had made for flights and parking allegedly part of his additional job as a football assistant referee.

On 10 June, Ross announced that he would resign as leader on the day of the general election. He also said that if he became an MP he would resign as an MSP. He later said that he decided to resign so that the leader of the Conservatives would be an MSP. On 4 July, Ross failed to win election to Aberdeenshire North and Moray East, losing to the SNP candidate Seamus Logan.

== Campaign ==
=== Announcements (22 July – 14 August) ===
Russell Findlay, a former journalist who was first elected as an MSP for West Scotland in 2021, was initially considered the frontrunner. Some MSPs thought that Findlay's supporters were responsible for negative news coverage of Greene and Meghan Gallacher, considered to be potential rival leadership candidates, which Findlay denied. Findlay announced his candidacy on 22 July 2024. Findlay had supported Liz Truss's campaign to become the UK-wide leader of the Conservative Party. Findlay said that the party should focus on the party's values of "enterprise, self-reliance, fiscal responsibility and the rule of law" over opposing the Scottish government. He said the party had focused too much on opposing Scottish independence and criticised Holyrood's "stifling left-wing consensus". He was seen as being supported by the "party establishment" and close to Ross.

Murdo Fraser announced his candidacy on 7 August. He was first elected as an MSP for Mid Scotland and Fife in 2001 and served as the deputy leader of the Scottish Conservatives from 2005 to 2011. He lost the 2011 Scottish Conservatives leadership election to Ruth Davidson. Fraser said that the UK-wide Conservative Party could stand candidates in Westminster elections but a new sister party could stand in Holyrood elections, citing the party system in Canada, with a commission established that would report after the next Scottish Parliament election. He said recent UK Conservative leaders and Ross had "let down" members. Fraser said the party should try to "reclaim the centre-ground". On 14 August, MSP Stephen Kerr accidentally published doubts about Murdo Fraser's campaign as a status update on WhatsApp, calling it "awful". Kerr had endorsed Fraser, but published that he was "beginning to wish" he had nominated Gallacher. Kerr said the comments were out of context, and reiterated his support for Fraser.

Meghan Gallagher, the party's deputy leader and an MSP for Central Scotland since 2021, announced her candidacy on 2 August. She said she would focus on "the right to buy a house, support for parents and pensioners" and lower taxes. She has criticised "the influence of gender ideology on Scottish institutions" and attacked the charity LGBT Youth Scotland, including by sharing an article accusing it of brainwashing children.

Jamie Greene announced his candidacy on 6 August. He was first elected as an MSP for West Scotland in 2016. He served as shadow justice secretary until 2023, when he was replaced by Russell Findlay, a decision he credited to his support for the Gender Recognition Reform (Scotland) Bill. He said he supported an independent commission on party structures to report after the 2026 Scottish Parliament election. He also advocated an "overhaul of [the Scottish Parliament's] processes and scrutiny". Greene opposed a "reactionary lurch to the right". He said he would seek to attract younger voters.

Liam Kerr, the shadow education secretary, announced he was standing on 5 August. He said the party needed a "genuinely conservative programme".

Brian Whittle announced his candidacy on 29 July. Whittle is a former athlete who became an MSP for South Scotland in 2016. He said he would focus on "education, enterprise and empowering people". He said that the party should consider means testing Scotland's free prescriptions and university tuition. On 20 August, Whittle withdrew and endorsed Fraser.

In the 2011 Scottish Conservatives leadership election, Murdo Fraser proposed splitting the Scottish Conservatives off from the UK-wide party. Fraser lost the election, but several MSPs including Jamie Greene, Liam Kerr and Liz Smith said that they were open to the idea in 2024. Russell Findlay and his supporter Miles Briggs strongly opposed the idea of a split or separate brand.

MSPs also disagreed about the party's policy positions. Stephen Kerr said the Scottish Conservatives should stop supporting free tuition and free prescriptions and move to the political right.

=== Close of nominations (15–22 August) ===
On 15 August, The Telegraph reported that Ross made plans in July 2023 to become a Westminster general election candidate, replacing the candidate in the Moray West seat, Kathleen Robertson. He was reported as saying he would step aside as leader if selected, and he wished to be succeeded by Findlay. This did not happen, but Ross was controversially selected for the Moray East seat.

On 16 August, four out of the six candidates running called for the race to be paused. Following the report, four candidates—Fraser, Greene, Kerr and Whittle—wrote a joint statement asking for clarification from party officials about the claims. Meghan Gallacher resigned as party deputy leader, citing the reports in her resignation letter. Ross's predecessor as leader, Jackson Carlaw, called on Ross to resign.

Findlay launched his leadership campaign in Glasgow on 19 August. He emphasised the need for "decency" in politics. He said that controversy about Ross's alleged conduct made the party look bad though there were "legitimate questions" about it. He emphasised that he would keep the party tightly integrated with the UK-wide Conservatives. He "said he strongly opposed decriminalising drugs for personal use but refused to answer whether he had taken Class A drugs, other than alluding to a holiday he had in Ibiza in the 1990s". He said he had made a mistake in supporting Liz Truss's leadership campaign.

On 21 August, Ross said some Conservative MSPs were "calculating bastards" who regularly briefed against him. Fraser later said that Ross had not been referring to him.

Three candidates, Greene, Kerr and Whittle, withdrew from the election and endorsed Fraser on 20 and 21 August. Kerr said he had nominations from 120 party members and could run, but was supporting Fraser instead.

On 22 August, Fraser launched his campaign at an event in Perth with his former rival candidates. He said that Findlay and Gallacher should withdraw from the election and support him. He said he would appeal to conservative nationalists disillusioned by the SNP by offering "practical solutions".

Three candidates were validly nominated: Findlay, Fraser and Gallacher.

=== The campaign (23 August – 22 September) ===
On 1 September, Gallacher confirmed that she would remain in the contest after it was alleged that a senior backer of Findlay was contacting party members and suggesting she was going to pull out.

On 2 September, the candidates took part in a TV debate on STV. And on 4 September, they all participated in a special episode of the podcast Holyrood Sources discussing the campaign and their leadership platforms.

Findlay received the backing of former party leader Ruth Davidson on 4 September. Davidson alleged that Fraser's proposal to create a commission to examine how the party operates was a "backdoor means to separate the party." Davidson was criticised by supporters of both Fraser and Gallacher for this claim.

On 6 September, The Telegraph published an article claiming that Gallacher had reported the shadow Scottish Secretary, and Findlay supporter, John Lamont to the party due to his conduct during the campaign. The article noted that "multiple sources" told the paper Lamont had contacted party members telling them that Gallacher was going to withdraw from the contest and endorse Fraser. Lamont denied these allegations. The article also noted that Gallacher was concerned about her career prospects after a phone call with Lamont (who heads the board which vets candidates for Holyrood and Westminster) where he warned their relationship had been damaged, perhaps beyond repair.

On 11 September, The Scotsman reported that Lamont had sent Gallacher a letter from his lawyer.

== Procedure ==
Candidates need to be nominated by at least 100 party members to stand for election. The election will take place under instant-runoff voting.

=== Timetable ===
- 8 August: nominations open
- 22 August: nominations close
- 4 September: start of voting
- 26 September: end of voting
- 27 September: winner announced

== Candidates ==
=== Declared ===
Candidate	Political office	Campaign	Ref.
Russell Findlay	Shadow justice secretary (2023–present); MSP for West Scotland (2021–present)	Leadership for Change	
Murdo Fraser	Shadow Business, Economic Growth and Tourism Secretary (2023-present); MSP for Mid Scotland and Fife (2001–present)	Real Change with Murdo	
Meghan Gallacher	Deputy leader of the Scottish Conservatives (2022–2024) (Note: Resigned during the campaign.); MSP for Central Scotland (2021–present)	Reset. Rebuild. Restore.	

=== Withdrew prior to nominations closing ===
Candidate	Political office	Campaign	Ref.	Note
Brian Whittle	Shadow environment secretary (2021–present); MSP for South Scotland (2016–present)	Whittle2Win		Withdrew on 20 August and endorsed Fraser
Jamie Greene	MSP for West Scotland (2016–present)	Fix the Party. Fix Politics. Fix Scotland.		Withdrew on 22 August and endorsed Fraser
Liam Kerr	Shadow Education Secretary (2023-present); Deputy leader of the Scottish Conservatives (September 2019–August 2020); MSP for North East Scotland (2016–present)	Vision-Unity-Integrity		Withdrew on 22 August and endorsed Fraser

=== Declined ===
The following Conservative politicians were speculated about as potential candidates but have ruled out standing for election:

- Craig Hoy, MSP for South Scotland since 2021
- Maurice Golden, MSP for West Scotland from 2017 to 2021 and North East Scotland since 2021 (endorsed Kerr and subsequently Fraser)
- Stephen Kerr, shadow education secretary, MSP for Central Scotland since 2021 (endorsed Fraser)
- Graham Simpson, MSP for Central Scotland since 2016 (Endorsed Fraser)

== Endorsements ==
Craig Hoy and Douglas Ross both declared that they would not publicly endorse any candidate.

Endorsements by MPs/MSPs (excluding candidates)
Candidate	Endorsements
Findlay	17 / 33 (52%)
Fraser	9 / 33 (27%)
Gallacher	2 / 33 (6%)

=== Russell Findlay ===
==== MSPs ====
- Miles Briggs, shadow social security secretary, MSP for Lothian
- Sharon Dowey, MSP for South Scotland
- Tim Eagle, MSP for Highlands and Islands
- Pam Gosal, MSP for West of Scotland
- Sandesh Gulhane, shadow health secretary, MSP for Glasgow
- Rachael Hamilton, shadow rural affairs secretary, MSP for Ettrick, Roxburgh, and Berwickshire
- Douglas Lumsden, shadow net zero secretary, MSP for North East Scotland
- Oliver Mundell, MSP for Dumfriesshire
- Alexander Stewart, MSP for Mid Scotland and Fife
- Sue Webber, MSP for Lothian
- Annie Wells, MSP for Glasgow
- Tess White, MSP for North East Scotland

==== MPs ====
- Andrew Bowie, shadow veterans minister, MP for West Aberdeenshire and Kincardine
- John Cooper, MP for Dumfries and Galloway
- Harriet Cross, MP for Gordon and Buchan
- David Mundell, former Scottish Secretary, MP for Dumfriesshire, Clydesdale, and Tweeddale
- John Lamont, shadow Scottish Secretary, MP for Berwickshire, Roxburgh, and Selkirk

==== Peers ====
- Malcolm Offord, former government minister
- Ruth Davidson, former Leader of the Scottish Conservative Party (2011-2019) and Leader of the Scottish Conservative Party in the Scottish Parliament (2020-2021)
- Michael Forsyth, former Scottish Secretary (1995-1997)

==== Notable party figures ====
- John Scott, former MSP for Ayr (2000-2021)

=== Murdo Fraser ===
==== MSPs ====
- Finlay Carson, MSP for Galloway and West Dumfries
- Maurice Golden, MSP for North East Scotland (previously backed Kerr)
- Jamie Greene, MSP for West Scotland (after withdrawing)
- Liam Kerr, shadow education and skills secretary, MSP for North East Scotland (after withdrawing)
- Stephen Kerr, MSP for Central Scotland
- Edward Mountain, MSP for Highlands and Islands
- Graham Simpson, MSP for Central Scotland
- Liz Smith, shadow finance secretary, MSP for Mid Scotland and Fife
- Brian Whittle, MSP for South Scotland (after withdrawing)

==== Peers ====
- Ian Duncan, former government minister
- Donald Cameron, former government minister and MSP for Highlands and Islands (2016-2024)

==== Notable party figures ====
- Malcolm Rifkind, former Foreign Secretary (1995-1997) and Scottish Secretary (1986-1990)

=== Meghan Gallacher ===
==== MSPs ====
- Jeremy Balfour, MSP for Lothian
- Roz McCall, MSP for Mid Scotland and Fife

== Result ==
2024 Scottish Conservative Party leadership election
Party	Candidate	FPv%	Count
Party	Candidate	FPv%	1
Conservative	Russell Findlay	61.73	✓ 2,565
Conservative	Murdo Fraser	28.57	1,187
Conservative	Meghan Gallacher	9.7	403
Electorate: 6,941 Valid: 4,155 Turnout: 60%
