= Rab Forman =

Scottish solicitor and Conservative Party politician

Rab Forman CBE WS

Chairman of the Scottish Conservatives
- In office 4 June 2015 – 20 May 2022 Serving with Rachael Hamilton from 14 February 2020
- Leader: Ruth Davidson; Jackson Carlaw; Douglas Ross
- Preceded by: The Lord Keen of Elie
- Succeeded by: Craig Hoy

Councillor, Lothian Regional Council
- In office 3 May 1990 – 5 May 1994

Personal details
- Born: Robert Forman; 1948 (age 77–78) Edinburgh, Scotland
- Party: Scottish Conservatives
- Education: University of Edinburgh
- Occupation: Solicitor

Robert Forman CBE WS (born 1948), known as Rab Forman, is a Scottish solicitor and politician. He was the Chairman of the Scottish Conservative and Unionist Party between June 2015 and May 2022, succeeding Richard Keen, and prior to that appointment served as Honorary Secretary of the party for ten years.

Rab Forman was born in Edinburgh and graduated from Royal High School and the University of Edinburgh. He was elected as a Councillor for the former Lothian Regional Council in 1990. He served the Merchiston and Morningside ward for four years. He was a senior partner at Blackadders LLP, where he practised as a private client solicitor.

Forman is a Writer to The Signet and was appointed a Member of The Most Excellent Order of the British Empire in the 2015 Queen's Birthday honours list. He was further awarded a CBE in the King’s Birthday honours list in 2024. He is the honorary president of his former school, Royal High School. He is a former Moderator of the Society of High Constables of Edinburgh. He is also the former captain of Mortonhall Golf Club.
