= 2005 Scottish Conservative Party leadership election =

- 2–8 November 2005
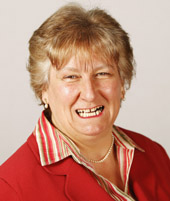
| Candidate | Annabel Goldie |
| Popular vote | Unopposed |
Leader before election
Annabel Goldie (acting)
David McLetchie
Elected Leader
Annabel Goldie

The 2005 Scottish Conservative Party leadership election was an internal party election to elect a new leader of the Scottish Conservative Party, the third largest political party in the devolved Scottish Parliament. The election was held following the resignation of David McLetchie following an expenses scandal. Following McLetchie's resignation on 31 October 2005, Annabel Goldie had become acting leader, and Goldie was declared leader after being the only declared candidate.

Goldie put herself forward as a leadership candidate on 2 November 2005—a joint nomination with Murdo Fraser as her proposed deputy. Their nomination was unopposed and Goldie was appointed leader on 8 November 2005, the first woman to lead the Scottish Conservative Party. In her maiden speech as leader, she promised to act against "disloyalty and disobedience" in the party and in a reference to Margaret Thatcher she said, "I think you may take it matron's handbag will be in hyper-action. There could be worse precedents to follow".
