= First Property Group =

Property investment company

First Property Group PLC
- Formerly: The Hansom Group (1994–2000); First Property Online (2000–2003)
- Type: Public
- ISIN: GB000000FPO1
- Industry: Property investment
- Founded: September 12, 1994; 32 years ago
- Headquarters: 32 St. James's Street; London; SW1A 1HD
- Number of locations: 31 properties (2026)
- Area served: London; Poland; Romania
- Key people: Ben Habib (CEO); Alasdair Locke (Chairman)
- Revenue: ▲£7.55M (2025)
- Operating income: ▲£4.82M (2025)
- Net income: ▲£3.03M (2025)
- Total equity: ▼£220M (2025)
- Number of employees: 43
- Subsidiaries: FProp Poland Sp. z o.o. FProp Cluj Ltd (FCL)
- Website: www.fprop.com

First Property Group is a commercial property fund investment company with operations in the United Kingdom and Central Europe. It is listed on the Alternative Investment Market (AIM) as a constituent of the London Stock Exchange.

== History ==
The company was incorporated on 12 September 1994 by David J. Hull under the Companies Act 1985 as the Hansom Group plc. It was a shell company run by non-executive Alasdair Locke which rebranded to First Property Online plc on the 21st of December 2000. This formed part of a reverse takeover by First Property Online, a web-based business-to-business property dealer founded by Ben Habib and John Kottler. It was then listed on the Alternative Investment Market of the London Stock Exchange under the ticker symbol FPO.

In 2001, the company moved into underwriting commercial property sales for a management fee and a share of the gain above the underwritten price.

It began property investment operations in Poland and Romania following cuts to interest rates after the 11th of September attacks. On 17 September 2003, the organisation was renamed again as First Property Group plc.

By 2005, it established an office in Warsaw to begin operations there as the "yield gap" had decreased significantly in the UK.

As the 2008 financial crisis unfolded, the firm changed its asset management policy and extended 70 per cent of leases for more than four years. By 2013, it resumed UK operations following the introduction of Permitted Development Rights (PDR) and increased demand for residential property through the Help to Buy scheme.

Operations expanded further in 2009 when the firm announced €90 million of acquisitions in Poland, Romania and the UK. Expansion in Poland continued in 2015 as the company focused on income generating property investments.

After the 2016 EU referendum, the company's CEO Ben Habib, who had voted to leave, stated that falling demand for UK sites and the devaluation of the pound against the euro had created "fantastic" opportunities for business.

In 2017 it raised a fund to invest in UK-based assets.

In July 2022, H. Samuel owner Signet Jewelers was ordered to pay the firm £448,043 in rent arrears for its Hertfordshire head office after First Property Group investment manager Martin Pryce alleged that it had misused relief claims under the Commercial Rent (Coronavirus) Act 2022.

The firm was awarded "Best Commercial Property Fund Manager – UK" by Wealth and Finance International in both 2022 and 2023.

In July 2025, Habib increased his shareholding in the firm to nearly 17 per cent.

== Operations and structure ==
In 2024, First Property Group owned £19M of assets in the United Kingdom, £43M in Poland, and £2.2M in Romania. The firm's management is divided into three parts: the PLC board, the London team and the Warsaw team.

Alasdair Locke, chairman of the Scottish Conservatives, serves as non-executive chairman.

Ben Habib, former Brexit Party Member of the European Parliament (MEP) for London from 2019 to 2020 and leader of the political party Advance UK, is chief executive officer.

=== United Kingdom ===
The firm owns several commercial properties in England which it leases to various businesses, including:

- Griffin House, Crawley
- Imperial Place, Borehamwood
- Union Park, Uxbridge
- 45 Clarendon Road, Watford

=== Poland ===
Nine of the eleven funds managed by First Property Asset Management Ltd (FPAM) are based in Poland.

First Property Poland Sp. z o.o. was established in 2006 as a subsidiary by managing director Przemysław Kiszka. It currently manages 11 properties and employs 30 staff.

=== Romania ===
In July 2022, the company announced it would sell the remaining assets it owned there in order to raise cash to invest in its Polish operations.
