= Sandesh Gulhane =

British Conservative politician

Sandesh Gulhane MSP
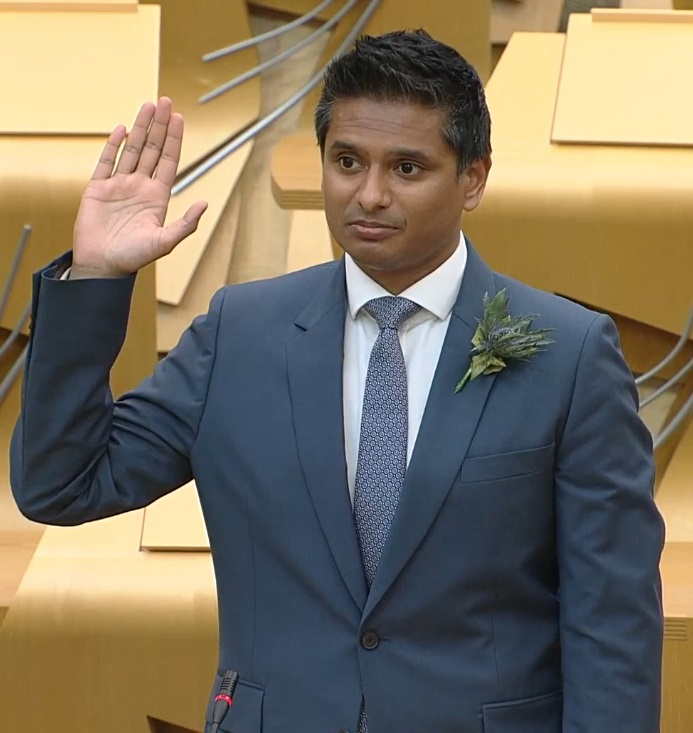

Scottish Shadow Cabinet Secretary for Health and Social Care
- In office 16 September 2021 – 8 April 2026
- Leader: Douglas Ross; Russell Findlay
- Preceded by: Annie Wells
- Succeeded by: Miles Briggs

Member of the Scottish Parliament for Glasgow (1 of 7 Regional MSPs)
- In office 6 May 2021 – 9 April 2026

Personal details
- Born: 22 January 1982 (age 44) London, England
- Party: Scottish Conservatives
- Education: The Haberdashers' Aske's Boys' School, London
- Alma mater: Imperial College London
- Profession: General practitioner

Sandesh Prakash Gulhane (born 22 January 1982) is a British Conservative politician who was a Member of the Scottish Parliament (MSP) for the Glasgow region May 2021–2026. He served as the Scottish Conservative Shadow Cabinet Secretary for Health and Social Care from 2021 to 2026. Gulhane is the first Hindu and first man of Indian descent to be elected to the Scottish Parliament.

== Early life and education ==
Gulhane was born and educated in London, England; he has two children. His parents, Prakesh and Pushpa Gulhane, were from Amravati in Maharashtra, India.

He studied at Imperial College London, and has been a doctor since 2006. He worked as a general practitioner in Glasgow, having previously worked as an orthopaedic registrar in hospitals in the city and East Kilbride, after moving to Scotland around 2011. Before then, he was based in Birmingham and Newcastle upon Tyne. He was club doctor of SPFL football club Queens Park F.C. from 2017 until August 2021. Gulhane continues to work one day per week as a GP.

== Political career ==
=== Member of the Scottish Parliament ===
Gulhane stood as the Conservative candidate for the Glasgow Pollok constituency, as well as being placed second on the party list for the Glasgow region, at the 2021 Scottish Parliament election. On the constituency vote, he finished a distant third with 1,849 votes (5.5%). Gulhane was instead elected as a regional member, which saw the party retain their two list seats.

On 16 September 2021, Gulhane was appointed as Shadow Cabinet Secretary for Health and Social Care, following the resignation of Annie Wells from the role.

In August 2023, he announced his candidacy to be the Conservative prospective parliamentary candidate in East Renfrewshire at the 2024 general election. In the election, Gulhane polled 8,494 votes (16.9%), taking third place.

== Personal life ==
Gulhane is married to fellow doctor and TV personality Punam Krishan.

== See also ==
- List of British Indians
- List of ethnic minority politicians in the United Kingdom
