= Gordon MacDonald (Scottish politician) =

Scottish National Party politician

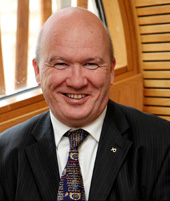

Member of the Scottish Parliament for Edinburgh Pentlands
- In office 5 May 2011 – 9 April 2026
- Preceded by: David McLetchie
- Succeeded by: Constituency abolished

Personal details
- Born: 2 January 1960 (age 66) Glasgow, Scotland
- Party: Scottish National Party
- Education: Glasgow College of Technology
- Website: www.gordonmacdonaldmsp.info

Gordon MacDonald (born 2 January 1960) is a Scottish National Party (SNP) politician. He served as Member of the Scottish Parliament (MSP) for the Edinburgh Pentlands constituency from 2011 to 2026.

== Early life ==
MacDonald was born in Glasgow and educated at Cumbernauld High School, the Central College of Commerce and the Glasgow College of Technology. He worked as a management accountant for Lothian Buses from 1989 to 2011.

== Political career ==
MacDonald contested the seat of Edinburgh Pentlands in the 2011 Scottish Parliament election, and defeated the Conservative incumbent David McLetchie by a margin of 1,758 votes. He was re-elected to the seat in the 2016 and 2021 elections.

On 28 February 2025, MacDonald announced he would stand down at the 2026 Scottish Parliament election.

== Personal life ==
MacDonald is married to Janet Campbell, who lives in Broxburn and is the SNP Councillor for Broxburn, Uphall and Winchburgh.
