= Craig Hoy =

Scottish Conservative politician

Craig Hoy MSP
- Official portrait, 2026

Chairman of the Scottish Conservative Party
- In office 20 May 2022 – 16 November 2024
- Deputy: Pam Gosal
- Leader: Douglas Ross; Russell Findlay
- Preceded by: Rab Forman and Rachael Hamilton
- Succeeded by: Alasdair Locke

Member of the Scottish Parliament for Dumfriesshire
- Incumbent
- Assumed office 7 May 2026
- Preceded by: Oliver Mundell
- Majority: 1,108 (3.4%)

Convener of the Social Justice, Housing and Local Government Committee
- Incumbent
- Assumed office 10 June 2026

Member of the Scottish Parliament for South Scotland (1 of 7 regional MSPs)
- In office 8 May 2021 – 9 April 2026
- Preceded by: Michelle Ballantyne

Scottish Conservative Shadow portfolios
- 2026–: Shadow Cabinet Secretary for Finance and Social Security
- 2024–2026: Shadow Cabinet Secretary for Finance and Local Government

Personal details
- Born: Craig William Hoy; 1975 (age 50–51)
- Party: Scottish Conservatives

Craig William Hoy (born 1975) is a Scottish Conservative politician, former businessman and journalist.

He holds the post of Shadow Cabinet Secretary for Finance and Local Government and serves in the Shadow Cabinet of the Scottish Conservatives under leader Russell Findlay at Holyrood. He is also the convener of the Social Justice, Housing and Local Government Committee.

He has served as Chairman of the Scottish Conservatives and was a member of the Shadow Cabinet under Douglas Ross.

Hoy was a Member of the Scottish Parliament (MSP) for the South Scotland region from 2021 until 2026. He was elected as the MSP for Dumfriesshire at the 2026 Scottish Parliament election.

== Background ==
Hoy was educated at Lasswade High School Centre and grew up in Dalkeith, Midlothian. He went to university in Edinburgh and graduated from City, University of London. He has a brother and sister.

Prior to becoming a politician, Hoy was a businessman in the conference and events arena in the UK, the EU and Asia Pacific. Prior to that he worked as a journalist, having been employed by the BBC and Parliamentary Communications. He was a cofounder of Holyrood magazine.

== Political career ==
Hoy was a member of East Lothian Council, representing the Haddington and Lammermuir ward, having been elected in a by-election in 2019.

Hoy contested the East Lothian seat in the 2019 general election, where he finished third.

=== Member of the Scottish Parliament ===
Hoy stood in East Lothian at the 2021 Scottish Parliament election, coming third with 9,470 votes (20.6%). Having been unsuccessful on the constituency vote, he was one of three Conservative candidates to be appointed as regional members on the South Scotland list.

As an MSP, Hoy has served as the Scottish Conservatives' Shadow Minister for Social Care and was a member of the shadow health team.

Additionally, he has also served as a member of the Scottish Parliament's Public Audit Committee and now serves as a member of the Finance and Public Administration Committee.

Following the 2022 Scottish local elections, Hoy was appointed Chairman of the Scottish Conservatives and oversaw the party's General Election campaign where five of six seats were held.

In May 2025, he was announced as the Conservative candidate for Dumfriesshire at the 2026 Scottish Parliament election, succeeding Oliver Mundell who announced he was standing down. Hoy was elected the constituency member.

== Personal life ==
Hoy lives in Moffat in Dumfriesshire with his civil partner.
