= David McLetchie =

Scottish Conservative politician (1952–2013)

David McLetchie CBE
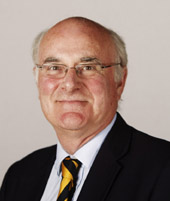
- Official portrait, 2011

Leader of the Scottish Conservative Party in the Scottish Parliament
- In office 6 September 1998 – 31 October 2005
- UK party leader: William Hague; Iain Duncan Smith; Michael Howard
- Preceded by: Office established
- Succeeded by: Annabel Goldie
Parliamentary offices
Member of the Scottish Parliament for Lothian (1 of 7 Regional MSPs)
In office 5 May 2011 – 12 August 2013
| Succeeded by | Cameron Buchanan (Note: Normally, regional MSPs do not have individual predecessors and successors. However, McLetchie died during a sitting parliament so was succeeded by Buchanan.) |
In office 6 May 1999 – 31 March 2003
Member of the Scottish Parliament for Edinburgh Pentlands
In office 1 May 2003 – 22 March 2011
| Preceded by | Iain Gray |
| Succeeded by | Gordon MacDonald |

Scottish Conservative portfolios
- 2007–2011: Chief Whip of the Scottish Conservative Party
- 2011–2013: Shadow Cabinet Secretary for Justice

Personal details
- Born: David William McLetchie; 6 August 1952 Edinburgh, Scotland
- Died: 12 August 2013 (aged 61) Edinburgh, Scotland
- Party: Scottish Conservatives
- Spouse: Sheila
- Children: 1 child, 2 stepchildren
- Education: University of Edinburgh

David William McLetchie CBE (6 August 1952 – 12 August 2013) was a Scottish politician who served as Leader of the Scottish Conservative Party from 1998 to 2005. He was Member of the Scottish Parliament (MSP) for the Edinburgh Pentlands constituency from 2003 to 2011 and the Lothian region from 1999 to 2003 and 2011 to 2013.

== Early life and career ==
Born in Edinburgh, McLetchie attended Leith Academy and George Heriot's School and graduated from the University of Edinburgh with a degree in law in 1974. He trained as a solicitor with Shepherd and Wedderburn, before joining Tods Murray where he was assumed a partner. He specialised in tax, trusts, and estate planning. In 1979, he contested the Edinburgh Central seat for the Conservatives, but lost to Robin Cook of the Labour Party.

== Member of the Scottish Parliament ==
=== Leader of the Scottish Conservative Party ===
McLetchie became Leader of the Scottish Conservative Party upon the creation of the Scottish Parliament in 1999, having been elected in the 1998 Scottish Conservative Party leadership election. He was forced to resign as Scottish Conservative leader following a scandal over his expense claims in 2005.

=== Resignation ===
McLetchie announced his resignation as Scottish Conservative Party leader on 31 October 2005, after it was revealed he had spent £11,500 of taxpayers' money on taxi fares, more than any other MSP. The problem was not so much the large bill, but that he had used taxis for Conservative party business (as opposed to constituency business). His successor as leader was Annabel Goldie.

=== Backbencher ===
McLetchie was elected as an additional member for the Lothians region in 1999 and the Edinburgh Pentlands constituency in 2003. Following his resignation as leader, he had a short spell as a backbencher in the Parliament though he remained a prominent figure, his major successes from this period include his campaigns on free personal care and road pricing.

McLetchie was re-elected in Edinburgh Pentlands in 2007 with an increased share of the vote and his majority doubled. On his return, he was made Conservative Chief Whip and business manager, a role which was set to be more important than ever before; given the SNP minority government. However, he lost his seat to Gordon MacDonald of the SNP in 2011. Although not re-elected in Pentlands, he was returned to Parliament as a "list" MSP for the Lothian region.

== Personal life ==
McLetchie was appointed a Commander of the Order of the British Empire (CBE) in the 2013 Birthday Honours. He died of cancer on 12 August 2013, aged 61.

== Notes ==
Scottish Parliament
| Preceded by Iain Gray | Member of the Scottish Parliament for Edinburgh Pentlands; 2003–2011 | Succeeded by Gordon MacDonald |
Party political offices
| Preceded by None | Leader of the Scottish Conservatives; 1999–2005 | Succeeded by Annabel Goldie |
