= Russell Findlay =

Scottish politician and journalist (born 1972/73)

Russell Findlay MSP
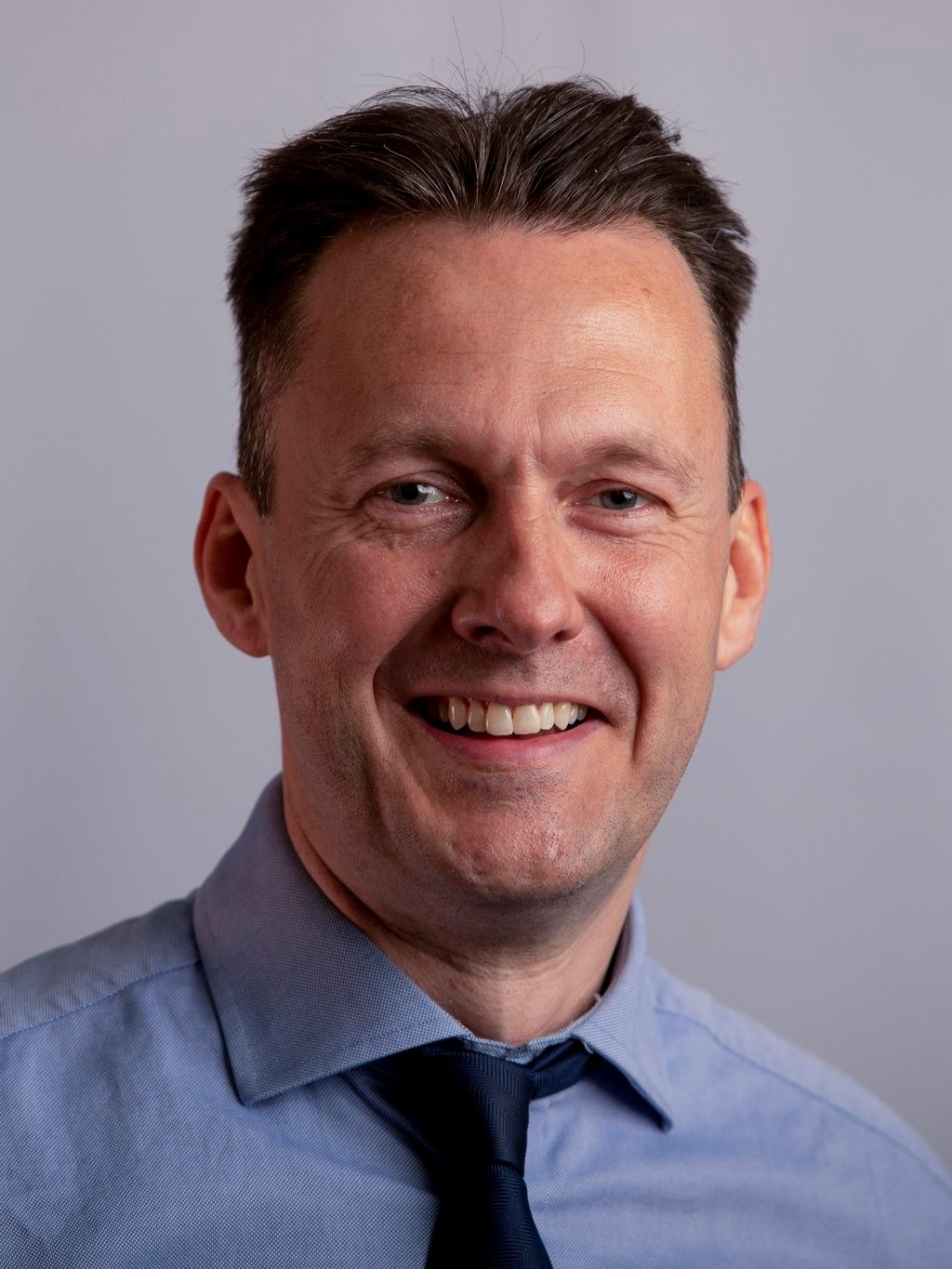
- Official portrait, 2021

Leader of the Scottish Conservative Party
- Incumbent
- Assumed office 27 September 2024
- Deputy: Rachael Hamilton
- UK party leader: Rishi Sunak (acting); Kemi Badenoch
- Chair: Craig Hoy; Alasdair Locke
- Preceded by: Douglas Ross

Member of the Scottish Parliament for West Scotland (1 of 7 Regional MSPs)
- Incumbent
- Assumed office 6 May 2021

Personal details
- Born: 1973 (age 52–53) Kilmarnock, Scotland
- Party: Scottish Conservatives
- Children: 1
- Education: Douglas Academy
- Alma mater: Napier Polytechnic

Russell Findlay (born 1973) is a Scottish journalist and politician who has served as Leader of the Scottish Conservative Party since September 2024. He has been a Member of the Scottish Parliament (MSP) for the West Scotland region from 2021.

== Early life ==
Russell Findlay was born in 1973 in Kilmarnock.

Findlay grew up in Milngavie, and attended Douglas Academy for secondary school. Findlay was one of four boys, however he has no contact with them or his parents, and his older brother died while Findlay was in his early 20s.

Findlay attended Napier Polytechnic (now Edinburgh Napier University) doing an HND, and graduated in 1993.

== Journalism career ==
Findlay's first journalist job was at The Glaswegian which he started in April 1993.

Findlay worked as a journalist for Scottish Television. Findlay was also a crime reporter with the Scottish Sun and Sunday Mail. His investigation into the disappearance of Margaret Fleming was used to help prosecute her killers. He has written three books, one of which is about his acid attack, and co-authored a fourth.

=== Acid attack ===
On 23 December 2015, while working as the investigations editor of the Scottish Sun, Findlay was subject to an acid attack at his house. William Burns, disguised as a Royal Mail postal worker, answered his door pretending to ask for a parcel's signature. Burns then threw sulphuric acid at Findlay's face before attempting to stab him with a knife. The two men ended up wrestling on the ground outside, before police arrived.

Burns was sentenced to a ten-year jail sentence with five years of post-release supervision. Ten months before the attack, Gordon Smart, editor of The Sun, received a call that included threats against Findlay, which Smart did not reveal until days after the attack. Findlay initially returned to work for The Sun but later took sick leave and left with an agreement from his employer.

Burns was later denied parole in October 2025.

== Political career ==
=== Member of the Scottish Parliament ===
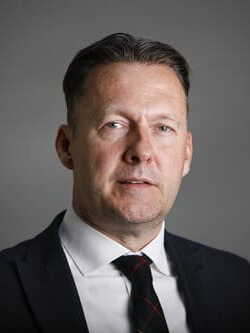
Russell Findlay in 2026

Findlay was selected as the Scottish Conservatives' candidate for the Paisley constituency in the 2021 Scottish Parliament election. He failed to win the seat, coming third with 3,342 votes (9.6%). Having been unsuccessful on the constituency ballot, Findlay was elected as an additional member for the West Scotland region, being second on the party list.

In March 2022, Findlay submitted a motion to the Scottish Parliament entitled "The Bravery of the Women of the Scottish Suffrage Movement" which stated that "deeds not words" of the Scottish Suffrage movement "progressed the pursuit of female enfranchisement across the United Kingdom" and went on to detail the names, actions and punishments of many Scotswomen involved. The motion is recorded as having fallen.

On 12 January 2022, Findlay called for Boris Johnson to resign as Conservative party leader and Prime Minister over the Westminster lockdown parties controversy along with a majority of Scottish Conservative MSPs.

On 27 December 2022, Findlay posted on Twitter a picture of himself holding a merkin, with a group of people in a pub, including Elaine Miller, who had flashed the Scottish Parliament and then those in the gallery, from the gallery, following the conclusion of the last debate on the Gender Recognition Reform (Scotland) Bill. In the post, he criticised the police's decision to investigate Miller over her self-declared indecency.

=== Leader of the Scottish Conservatives ===
On 10 June 2024, Douglas Ross announced his intention to resign as leader of the Scottish Conservatives upon the election of his successor. Findlay, who had been considered a frontrunner for the position, announced his candidacy for leader on 22 July. After announcing his leadership intentions, Findlay was informed by Police Scotland of death threats made towards him. Facing fellow MSPs Murdo Fraser and Meghan Gallacher, Findlay received 52% of MSP endorsements and was elected leader with 61.7% of the first-preference vote among party members. Findlay had also received endorsements from all Scottish Tory MPs, along with former leader Ruth Davidson. He assumed leadership, becoming leader of the largest opposition party in the Scottish Parliament on 27 September. He formed his Shadow Cabinet on 8 October.

In his first speech at the Birmingham 2024 Conservative Party conference, Findlay criticised the focus on Scottish independence by the SNP,

In December 2025, Findlay lodged a motion of no confidence in Justice Secretary Angela Constance over claims that she had misled the Scottish Parliament by misrepresenting the views of child sexual exploitation expert Professor Alexis Jay over the necessity of an inquiry into the issue in Scotland. The motion was defeated by 57 votes in favour to 67 against, with one abstention. An investigation by the Scottish Government's independent advisors later concluded that Constance had inadvertently misled Parliament over the issue.

Findlay led his party into the 2026 Scottish Parliament election. He did not rule out nominating Anas Sarwar for first minister. He similarly did not rule out working with Reform UK. In the election he led his party to their worst ever defeat at 12 seats, a loss of 19 seats from the last election. Findlay won a seat on the party list.

=== Political views ===
Findlay openly supported the bid of Liz Truss to become the prime minister of the United Kingdom in the 2022 leadership election.

Findlay voted "No" in the 2014 Scottish independence referendum.

== Personal life ==
Findlay has a daughter, whom he has held sole custody of since she was four, and has been married twice.
