= 1998 Scottish Conservative Party leadership election =

- 6 September 1998
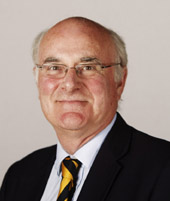

Candidate	David McLetchie	Phil Gallie
Delegate votes	91	83
Percentage	52.3%	47.7%
Leader before election
New position
Elected Leader
David McLetchie

The 1998 Scottish Conservative Party leadership election was an internal party election for a new leader of the Scottish Conservative Party. The previous year the party had lost all of its MPs in the 1997 general election. Two individuals put themselves forward; Former Scottish Conservative President David McLetchie, and former Ayr MP Phil Gallie. McLetchie won the election with 52.3% of votes cast. The Leader was elected via a secret ballot at a meeting of senior party officials, including Conservative candidates for the Scottish parliament, constituency chairs, area officers and the party’s Scottish executive.

== Leadership election ==
Candidate	Votes	
Candidate	Delegate votes	%
David McLetchie ✓	91	52.3%
Phil Gallie	83	47.7%
