= Alasdair Locke =

British businessman (born 1953)

Chairman of the Scottish Conservative Party
- Incumbent
- Assumed office 16 November 2024
- Leader: Russell Findlay

Personal details
- Born: August 29, 1953 (age 73) Aldershot, England
- Party: Scottish Conservative

Alasdair James Dougall Locke (born 29 August 1953) is a British businessman and political donor. He is the former chairman of the Scottish oil services company Abbot Group, which has rigs in Africa (Libya), the North Sea, Sakhalin Island, and other areas, and the chairman of First Property Group. He was awarded Scotland Overall and Master Entrepreneur Of The Year in 1999, and received the International Business Achievement Award from the Scottish Business Achievement Award Trust in 2007.

== Business career ==
Locke holds a degree in history and economics from the University of Oxford.

His career started in investment banking with Citigroup in 1974, where he specialised in shipping and oil.

Locke stepped down as executive chairman of Abbot Group in November 2009. He reportedly had interest in both development and the insurance sector, which he said he would maintain.

In 2019, Locke and his stepson Alex Christou co-founded Glenrinnes Distillery, which is located in Glenrinnes, Scotland. In July 2019, Locke and his stepson introduced Organic Speyside Vodka and Organic Speyside Gin, backed by an investment of £4 million. Locke sits as non-executive chairman of First Property Group, a commercial property investment company.

=== Political activity ===
He was a donor to the leadership campaign of Russell Findlay. He became chairman of the Scottish Conservative Party in November 2024.
