= Elaine Miller =

Scottish physiotherapist

- Education: Glasgow Caledonian University
- Occupations: Physiotherapist and women's health campaigner

Elaine Miller aka Gussie Grippers is a Scottish physiotherapist, women's health campaigner and gender-critical activist. Miller performs comedy shows around the subject of women's health, highlighting issues related to urinary incontinence, and her shows have won awards at Fringe World, Australia and at Edinburgh Festival Fringe. She came to mainstream media attention for flashing a pubic wig in the Scottish Parliament during a debate on the Gender Recognition Reform (Scotland) Bill.

== Career ==
Miller is a Fellow of the Chartered Society of Physiotherapy. Both her physiotherapy and her comedy feature a specialism in pelvic floor dysfunction. While working as a physiotherapist in Scotland Miller developed a comedy show designed to engage audiences in understanding how physiotherapy can be used to tackle and prevent urinary incontinence. She began her career in the field of sports physiotherapy, but after her own experience of becoming incontinent after having delivered three children, she began to focus on exercises for the pelvic floor. She has been invited as a contributing expert on women's health topics in UK media, including Woman's Hour on BBC Radio 4.

Her show won 'Weirdest Show at the Fringe' at the Edinburgh festivals in 2013 and the Australian Fringe World Comedy Award in 2020. Attendance at her 2016 show counted towards continuing professional development (CPD) for a range of health professionals including GPs, midwives, nurses, urologists, gynaecologists, health visitors and fitness professionals, accredited by Scottish Care. Her public engagement activities aim to use laughter as an essential health promotion tool, and are in the tradition of 'clown care'. Her comedy highlights the fact that laughing is one of the things which causes many women bladder leakage.

She works to highlight a gap in women's health support and get government funding for the provision of physiotherapy to improve women’s health. She performs under the stage name Gussie Grippers. Her acts have included costumes such as dressing up as a vulva and songs such as "does your cervix hang low?".

== Activism ==
Miller works to highlight issues in women's health. Miller believes the barriers which deter women from seeking help dealing with stress urinary incontinence and pelvic organ prolapse need to be explored and that raising awareness of pelvic floor exercises can have a significant effect on the day to day lives of many.

In 2022 Miller attracted mainstream media coverage when she wore, and flashed a merkin in the Scottish Parliament during debate on the Gender Recognition Reform (Scotland) Bill, to express opposition to the bill. After an initial police investigation she was found not to have committed any crime.

== Politics ==
In 2023 she became an independent candidate for election in Edinburgh Corstorphine and Murrayfield and used her campaign in part to highlight issues of women's health provision in Edinburgh. She received 327 votes, representing 3.7% of the vote.

== Performances ==
- Gusset Grippers
- Viva your Vulva
