= Merkin =

Pubic wig

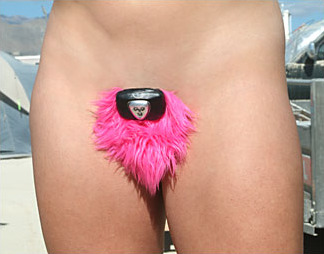
A merkin (with flashlight) worn by a woman to cover her pubic area.

A merkin is a pubic wig. Merkins are worn by people after shaving their mons pubis, and are used as decorative items or erotic devices by both women and men.

== History and etymology ==
The Oxford Companion to the Body dates the origin of the pubic wig to the 1450s, but gives no primary source to attest this. According to the publication, women would shave their pubic hair for personal hygiene and to combat pubic lice. They would then put on a merkin. Also, sex workers would wear a merkin to cover up signs of disease, such as syphilis.

The Oxford English Dictionary dates the first written use of the term to 1617. The word probably originated from malkin, a derogatory term for a lower-class young woman, or from Marykin, a pet form of the female given name Mary.

== Application ==
A merkin is typically attached directly to the skin using skin-safe adhesive, such as spirit gum or specialized wig tape. The adhesive is applied to the lace backing of the merkin, which is then pressed onto the skin and held until set. It is reusable and removable.

== Contemporary use ==
=== Film ===
Sometimes in filmmaking, merkins can be worn by actresses to avoid inadvertent exposure of the genitalia during nude or semi-nude scenes. The presence of the merkin protects the actor from inadvertently performing "full-frontal" nudity which can help ensure that the film achieves a less restrictive rating.

A merkin may also be used when the actor or actress has less pubic hair than is required, as in the nude dancing extras in The Bank Job. Amy Landecker wore a merkin in A Serious Man (2009) for a nude sunbathing scene; clean shaving was not common in 1967 when the film is set.

- Kate Winslet said she refused to wear a merkin in The Reader.
- Gina Gershon wore a merkin in Killer Joe.
- In the director's audio commentary of The Girl with the Dragon Tattoo, director David Fincher discussed how a merkin was used for actress Rooney Mara, after she suggested to him that the character she portrayed in the film was a natural redhead in the book and dyed her hair black. Consequently, the merkin she wore was made in the color red. For the release of the movie in Japan, Fincher stated: "I believe in Japan we had to put a mosaic over it because fake pubes are considered to be ... nasty."
- In the Italian film La Pelle (English: The Skin), which takes place during the Allied occupation of Naples after World War II, blond merkins are made for the local prostitutes to pass for blondes for the US soldiers.
- In the film The Greasy Strangler, the character Janet wears a merkin.

=== Television ===
- In the television series Black Sails, Jessica Parker Kennedy wore a pubic wig.
- Lucy Lawless was fitted for a merkin for the 2010 TV series Spartacus: Blood and Sand, but did not use it.

=== Other ===
- At the São Paulo Fashion Week in 2010, the design firm Neon dressed a nude model in transparent plastic. According to the designer, the model wore a pubic wig to make her appear more natural.
- In 2022, in response to the passing of reforms to the Gender Recognition Act in Scotland, Elaine Miller wore a pubic wig and flashed the Scottish parliament chamber in protest.
- In the BBC radio comedy The Castle, the local pub is the "Merk Inn".
- Merkin Ball is an EP by American alternative rock band Pearl Jam featuring Canadian-American musician Neil Young. It was released as a companion to Young's 1995 album Mirror Ball.
