= Salaries, expenses, and allowances of members of the Scottish Parliament =

Members of the Scottish Parliament (MSPs) are entitled to a salary, and where applicable, expenses and allowances.

The Scotland Act 1998 provides for pay and allowances to MSPs, officeholders of the Scottish Parliament and Ministers. The Parliament is required to make provision (by Act of the Scottish Parliament or by resolution of the Parliament) for the payment of:

- salaries and allowances to MSPs and to members of the Scottish Executive (which includes junior Scottish ministers), and
- pensions and the like to former MSPs, members of the Scottish Executive and officeholders of the Parliament.

MSPs are not entitled to any salary or allowance until they have taken the oath of allegiance required by the Act. Once they have done so, they are entitled to relevant payments for the whole period as a member of the Parliament.

== History ==
In July 1997, the UK Government invited the Review Body on Senior Salaries (SSRB) to set the initial salaries of MSPs, but said that it would be for the Scottish Parliament to determine the allowances to be paid to MSPs. In March 1999, the SSRB published two reports (Review Body on Senior Salaries 1999a and Review Body on Senior Salaries 1999b) and, on 31 March, the Prime Minister accepted all the SSRB's recommendations as to pay levels for MSPs, officeholders of the Scottish Parliament and Scottish Ministers. He also accepted the arguments for an early review, in 2001, of the levels of pay and allowances.

Initial salaries of £40,092, subject to annual up-rating according to the senior civil service formula, were set established. The Presiding Officer received an additional £33,360 and deputy Presiding Officer an additional £17,305 a year. This remained in force until the Parliament made alternative arrangements (in the 2001 review) for the current salary scheme. Under this scheme, salaries were up-rated annually from 1 April each year using a formula relating to senior civil service salary increases, which in turn remained in force until 1 April 2002 when the Scottish Parliament's own arrangements, conferring the function of setting salaries on the Scottish Parliamentary Corporate Body (SPCB), came into effect.

=== 2001 Review ===
In 2001, on the invitation of the then First Minister and the then Presiding Officer, the SSRB again reviewed parliamentary pay of MSPs, officers of the Parliament and Ministers, as well as allowances. The SSRB reported in December 2001 and its recommendations, which were broadly accepted by the four main political parties were as follows:

- MSPs’ salaries should be set at 87.5% of MPs’ salaries at Westminster (recommendation 1)
- there should be no change to the arrangements for the salaries of the First Minister, Deputy First Minister, other Scottish Ministers, the Lord Advocate and the Solicitor General for Scotland (recommendations 2 and 3)
- the officeholder salaries of the Junior Ministers and the Deputy Presiding Officers should be increased to £22,145 (recommendation 5)
- any future adjustments at Westminster should trigger a review of the relevant salaries at the Scottish Parliament (recommendation 7)

The SSRB further recommended that the leader of the next largest non-executive party should get a salary of £32,422 over and above the MSP's salary (recommendation 6). This was not accepted by all the main political parties, with some preferring instead to consider a supplementary allowance to assist all non-executive party leaders (with more than 15 MSPs) in undertaking their duties. The accepted proposal was that leaders of parties with no Scottish Minister or Junior Minister amongst its members should receive a sum additional to their salary (see below). It was also proposed that the leader of the main non-Executive party should receive an additional £32,000. This became the Party Leaders' Allowances Scheme.

=== Post 2001 Review ===
Scottish Parliament Salaries and Allowances was debated in the Chamber on 21 March 2002.

It was argued in debate that because MSPs were uncomfortable about setting their own salaries, the motion for debate provided that the SPCB should decide salary levels for members and ministers and that any future increases should be based on 87.5% of Westminster salaries. It was also recognised that circumstances may change in the future and that the automatic link to Westminster salaries may no longer be appropriate. For this reason the motion provided that the SPCB would be responsible for the review and implementation of future salary levels, having taken, and had regard to, appropriate advice on the matter.

== Current salaries ==
From 1 April 2025, the salary of a Member of the Scottish Parliament is £74,507. Additional amounts are paid to ministers and officers of the Parliament. Both the Lord Advocate and the Solicitor General for Scotland receive the equivalent of an MSP salary included with their Law Officer salaries.

Between 1 April 2009 and 31 March 2025, Ministers froze both the MSP and Ministerial elements of their pay at 2008-09 levels. Since 1 April 2025, Ministers have received the same MSP salary as other MSPs but the Ministerial element of their pay remains frozen at 2008-09 levels. The exception to this is the First Minister, who chose to continue to freeze both the MSP and Ministerial elements of his pay at 2008-09 levels. This is processed by a voluntary deduction from net pay but pension entitlement is preserved on the higher amount.

Salaries for Members of the Scottish Parliament from 1 April 2025 (£ per year)
Office	Additional Office holder's salary	Total salary
First Minister	107,931	182,438
Cabinet Secretary	55,993	130,500
Presiding Officer	55,993	130,500
Minister	35,077	109,584
Deputy Presiding Officers	35,077	109,584
Lord Advocate	73,149	147,656
Solicitor General	52,897	127,404
MSPs	N/A	74,507

== Allowances ==
MSP's are allowed to claim for certain expenses encountered as a result of taking up their position, these include:

- Members’ Support Allowance

Office-cost provision

£21,100

Members are able to flex up to £6,357 from engagement provision to office-cost provision in 2024/25

Regional Members will be advised of their office-cost provision on an individual basis

Engagement provision

£17,400

Members are able to flex up to £6,357 from office-cost provision to engagement provision in 2024/25

Staff cost provision

£156,900

Accommodation Allowance

Edinburgh accommodation provision (annual)	£20,700
Edinburgh accommodation provision: overnight rate	£225‡
Overnight (UK excluding Greater London)	£225‡
Overnight (Greater London and outside UK)	£262‡

‡ includes dinner, bed and breakfast

Members’ Travel Allowance

This reimburses travelling expenses at specified rates (car travel 45p per mile for first 10,000 miles and 25p per mile thereafter, motorbike 24p per mile and bicycle 20p per mile) necessarily incurred by that Member within Scotland in performing his or her parliamentary duties.

Winding Up Allowance

£9,152 - Constituency Members

Regional Members will be advised on an individual basis as required but will equate to one third of their maximum OCP (Office cost provision).

Party leader's allowance

30+ members	£48,885
15 to 29 members	£25,738

The figures above are for the financial year 2024/25.

== Pensions ==
Pensions are available to MSPs and specified office holders (including the Lord Advocate and the Solicitor General, but not First Minister or Presiding Officer, where separate arrangements exist). They are paid out of a fund known as the Scottish Parliamentary Contributory Pension Fund, and administered by the SPCB. Participants contribute 11% of their salaries or, where applicable, 11% of a ‘permitted maximum’ salary, in return for a final salary pension times an accrual rate of 2.5% for each year. Participants can apply for an early pension where they cease to be a contributor because of ill health before attaining the age of 65. The MSP Pension Fund has been identified as particularly generous with an economic cost of more than 70% of the MSP base salary. In particular the tax returns of former First Minister Nicola Sturgeon revealed the benefits are more than the annual allowance of 40,000 and are substantially more valuable than the equivalent offered to MPs in Westminster. Voluntary pay freezes for Ministers in the Scottish Government are not applied to pension entitlement with benefits being accrued on the full amount of remuneration.

== MSP and Office-holder resettlement grants ==
MSPs who retire at the time of a general election are entitled to a generous tax efficient resettlement grant in addition to the costs of winding up their offices. The amounts are determined by the MSP salary at the time and the length of office with a minimum paying of 50% of annual salary and a maximum of 100% of annual salary for 12 years of service. This arrangement is much more generous than the 2 x statutory redundancy entitlement offered to retiring MPs in Westminster. The payment is also made for office-holders who retire from their position. In each case it is available to MSPs of any age including those who retire at or above the normal pension age of 65.

== Expenses for 'Non-Executive' parties ==
Financial assistance is available for opposition parties "for the purpose of assisting members of the Parliament who are connected with such parties to perform their Parliamentary duties." To be eligible, a party may have no more Ministers or Junior Ministers than one fifth of the total number of Ministers and Junior Ministers within the Scottish Government.

In addition, a Party Leader's Allowance is available to leaders of registered political parties with not less than 15 MSPs, excluding the leader of any party which has a Scottish Minister or Junior Minister amongst its members. The scheme provides for reimbursement of specified expenses incurred by a qualifying party leader, the current figures are:

Maximum Party Leader's Allowances from 1 April 2007
	Type of cost	Maximum amount payable
Payment per Party	Registered political party with 15 - 29 members	£13,094
Payment per Party	Registered political party with 30 or more members	£24,959
Other Costs	Car Hire Allowance	£18 per hour
Other Costs	Car Hire Allowance	£1.80 per mile
Other Costs	Car Hire Allowance	£41.60 per Edinburgh airport transfer
Other Costs	Car Hire Allowance	£1 per minute (car phone)
The total of the invoice is subject to a 20% discount
