= Meghan Gallacher =

Scottish Conservative politician

Meghan Gallacher MSP
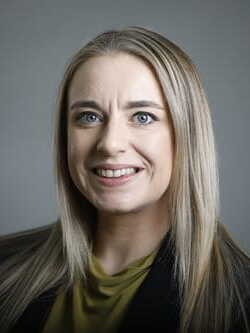
- Official portrait, 2026

Deputy Leader of the Scottish Conservative Party
- In office 9 May 2022 – 16 August 2024
- Leader: Douglas Ross
- Preceded by: Liam Kerr and Annie Wells (Note: Office vacant between 12 August 2020 and 9 May 2022.)
- Succeeded by: Rachael Hamilton

Member of the Scottish Parliament for Central Scotland and Lothians West (1 of 7 Regional MSPs)
- Incumbent
- Assumed office 7 May 2026

Member of the Scottish Parliament for Central Scotland (1 of 7 Regional MSPs)
- In office 6 May 2021 – 9 April 2026

Councillor, North Lanarkshire Council
- In office 5 May 2017 – 5 May 2022
- Constituency: Motherwell West

Personal details
- Born: 17 January 1992 (age 34) Bellshill, North Lanarkshire, Scotland
- Party: Scottish Conservatives
- Education: University of the West of Scotland

Meghan Gallacher (born 17 January 1992) is a Scottish politician who served as Deputy Leader of the Scottish Conservatives from 2022 to 2024. She has been a Member of the Scottish Parliament (MSP) for the Central Scotland and Lothians West region since 2026, and was MSP for the predecessor Central Scotland region between 2021 and 2026. Gallacher was a councillor for the Motherwell West ward from 2017 to 2022, serving as the Conservatives party's group leader in the North Lanarkshire Council.

Gallacher was a candidate in the 2024 Scottish Conservatives leadership election, finishing 3rd.

== Early life ==
=== Education ===
Meghan Gallacher was born on 17 January 1992 in Bellshill, North Lanarkshire and was brought up in nearby Holytown. She studied political science and government at the Hamilton Campus (now New Lanarkshire Campus) of the University of the West of Scotland from 2010 to 2014.

=== Early career ===
While studying at university, Gallacher worked part-time at John Lewis and Partners in customer service. In 2014, after graduating, she worked full-time at the company for two years. She served as a Customer Relations Case Manager, dealing with customer concerns at CEO level. In September 2016, she left John Lewis to work as a Parliamentary Researcher for Edward Mountain, the MSP for the Highlands and Islands region.

=== Early political involvement ===
Gallacher grew up in a predominantly left-wing community. Her grandmother, Elizabeth McLeod, stood unsuccessfully in various elections to the North Lanarkshire Council. After attending an association meeting with her grandmother, Gallacher joined the Scottish Conservatives.

Gallacher first stood for election in 2015 at Thorniewood ward by-election for North Lanarkshire Council, she was eliminated at Stage 5 of the count. The following year, she stood for the Motherwell and Wishaw constituency at the 2016 Scottish Parliament election, finishing in third place. She was also the fifth placed Conservative list candidate for the Central Scotland region, but was not elected.

== Political career ==
=== North Lanarkshire Council (2017–2022) ===
Gallacher was elected to North Lanarkshire Council for the Motherwell West ward in 2017, she subsequently became the party's group leader.

At the 2015, 2017 and 2019 UK general elections, she stood for the Motherwell and Wishaw constituency, finishing third on all three occasions.

=== Member of the Scottish Parliament ===
At the 2021 Holyrood election, Gallacher stood in the Hamilton, Larkhall and Stonehouse constituency, finishing a distant third with 6,332 votes (17.5%) She was also third on the Conservative list for the Central Scotland region, and was elected as a regional member.

On 12 January 2022, Gallacher called for Boris Johnson to resign as Conservative party leader and Prime Minister over the Westminster lockdown parties controversy along with a majority of Scottish Conservative MSPs.

==== Deputy Leader of the Scottish Conservatives (2022–2024) ====
On 9 May 2022, she was announced as the new deputy leader of the Scottish Conservatives, following on from the 2022 Scottish local elections.

Gallacher resigned as deputy leader on 16 August 2024, writing in a letter to outgoing leader Douglas Ross that it would be inappropriate for her to continue in the role due to her standing in the leadership election to succeed him and due to reported allegations he had sought to stand down the year earlier and install Russell Findlay as leader.

In the 2026 Scottish Parliament election, she was elected as the only Conservative MSP for the new Central Scotland and Lothians West region.

== Personal life ==
Gallacher is married to Graeme McGinnigle, a former East Dunbartonshire councillor who she met at a Conservative Party reception. They have one daughter.
