= Leader of the Scottish Conservative Party =

Head of the Conservative Party of Scotland

Leader of the Scottish Conservative and Unionist Party
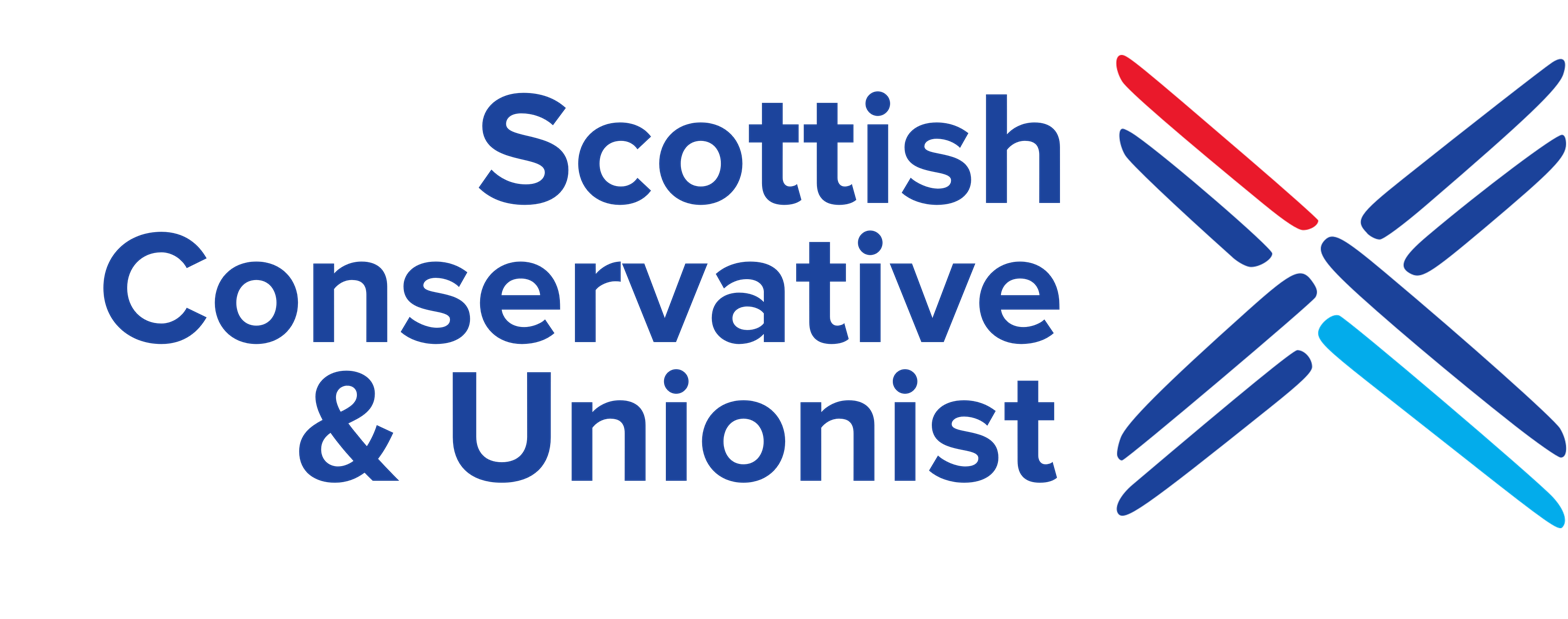
- Logo for the Scottish Conservative Party

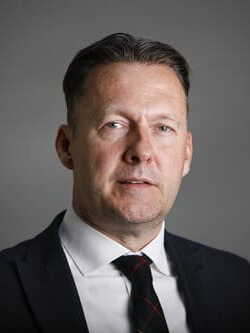
- Incumbent; Russell Findlay since 27 September 2024
- Type: Party leader
- Precursor: Leader of the Conservative Party in the Scottish Parliament
- Inaugural holder: Ruth Davidson (as Leader)

The leader of the Scottish Conservative Party (officially the leader of the Scottish Conservative and Unionist Party) is the highest position within the Scottish Conservative Party. The current holder of the position is Russell Findlay, who was elected to the position on 27 September 2024, replacing Douglas Ross.

If the Scottish Conservative Party were to be in Scottish Government, the leader would usually become the First Minister of Scotland as well as appointing the Scottish cabinet.

== Background ==
The position of Leader of the Scottish Conservative Party was created in 2011. The new position of Scottish party leader was created following the recommendations of the Sanderson Commission.

Prior to the creation of the post, the leader was Leader of the Scottish Conservative Party in the Scottish Parliament (1999–2011).

== Leaders of the party ==
No.	Portrait	Name	Term start	Term end
1		Ruth Davidson	4 November 2011	29 August 2019
Jackson Carlaw was interim leader during this period
2		Jackson Carlaw	14 February 2020	30 July 2020
3		Douglas Ross	5 August 2020	27 September 2024
4		Russell Findlay	27 September 2024	Incumbent
