= Douglas Ross (Scottish politician) =

Former Leader of the Scottish Conservative Party

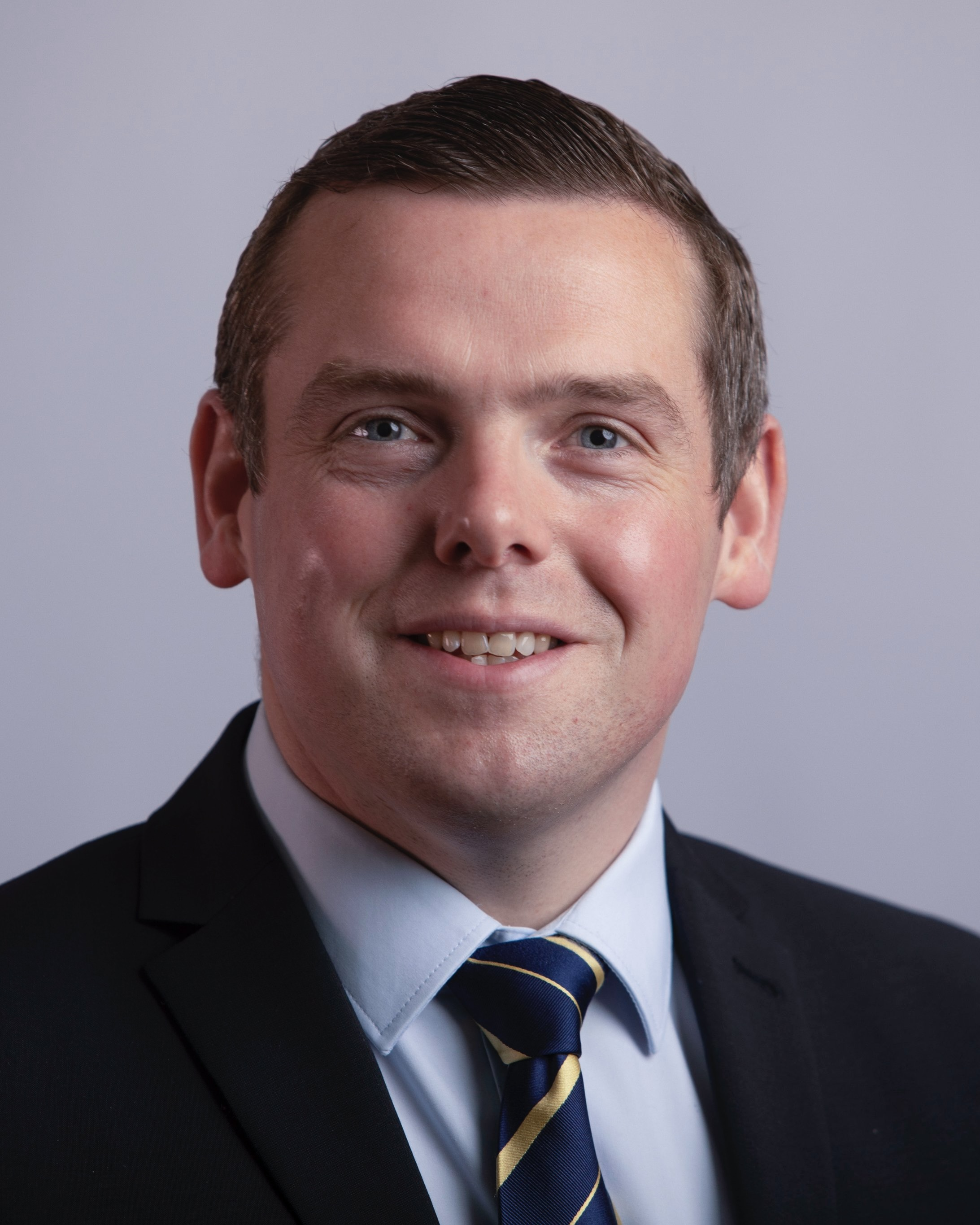
- Official portrait, 2021

Leader of the Scottish Conservative Party (Note: Ross served as Leader of the Conservative Party in the Scottish Parliament from 6 May 2021, having been preceded by Ruth Davidson.)
- In office 5 August 2020 – 27 September 2024
- Deputy: Meghan Gallacher
- UK party leader: Boris Johnson; Liz Truss; Rishi Sunak
- Chair: Rab Forman; Rachael Hamilton; Craig Hoy
- Preceded by: Jackson Carlaw
- Succeeded by: Russell Findlay

Parliamentary Under-Secretary of State for Scotland
- In office 17 December 2019 – 26 May 2020
- Prime Minister: Boris Johnson
- Preceded by: Colin Clark; Robin Walker
- Succeeded by: David Duguid; Iain Stewart

Member of the Scottish Parliament for Highlands and Islands (1 of 7 regional MSPs)
- In office 6 May 2021 – 9 April 2026
- In office 5 May 2016 – 11 June 2017
- Succeeded by: Jamie Halcro Johnston (Note: Normally, regional MSPs do not have individual predecessors and successors. However, Ross retired his seat during a sitting parliament so was succeeded by Halcro Johnston.)

Member of Parliament for Moray
- In office 8 June 2017 – 30 May 2024
- Preceded by: Angus Robertson
- Succeeded by: Constituency abolished

Scottish Conservative portfolios
- 2016–2017: Shadow Cabinet Secretary for Justice

Personal details
- Born: Douglas Gordon Ross; 27 January 1983 (age 43) Aberdeen, Scotland
- Party: Scottish Conservatives
- Other political affiliations: Scottish Liberal Democrats (formerly)
- Spouse: Krystle Ross (m. 2015)
- Children: 2
- Education: Scottish Agricultural College

Douglas Gordon Ross (born 27 January 1983) is a Scottish politician and professional football referee who served as Leader of the Scottish Conservative Party from 2020 to 2024 and as leader of the largest opposition party in the Scottish Parliament from 2021 to 2024. He served as the Member of the UK Parliament (MP) for Moray from 2017 to 2024, and as a Member of the Scottish Parliament (MSP) for the Highlands and Islands electoral region from 2016 to 2017 and again from 2021 to 2026.

Born in Aberdeen, Ross was educated at Forres Academy. After graduating from the Scottish Agricultural College, he worked on a dairy farm. A member of the Scottish Liberal Democrats in his youth, he switched to the Scottish Conservatives and began his political career as a Scottish Parliament researcher and then a councillor in Moray. He stood unsuccessfully for the Moray UK Parliament constituency in the 2010 and 2015 general elections and for the Scottish Parliament constituency in 2011 and 2016. In the latter election, he was elected as a regional list MSP as one of the additional members for the Highlands and Islands.

Ross was elected to the House of Commons at the 2017 general election, defeating SNP deputy leader Angus Robertson, and was re-elected in 2019 with a reduced majority. He served as Parliamentary Under-Secretary of State for Scotland under Prime Minister Boris Johnson for six months. He resigned in May 2020, in protest at Dominic Cummings continuing to serve as Johnson's adviser after breaking lockdown rules during the COVID-19 pandemic. He was selected to stand in Aberdeenshire North and Moray East in the 2024 United Kingdom general election, and was defeated by the SNP's Seamus Logan.

Following the resignation of Jackson Carlaw in July 2020, Ross announced his candidature in the August 2020 Scottish Conservative Party leadership election. Five days later, he was elected leader unopposed. He ran on a joint ticket with former Scottish Conservative leader Ruth Davidson. Since he served in the House of Commons and was not an MSP, Davidson led the party in the Scottish Parliament until the 2021 Scottish Parliament election. He announced he would stand down as the leader of the Scottish Conservatives after the 2024 United Kingdom general election.

== Early life and career ==
Douglas Gordon Ross was born in Aberdeen on 27 January 1983 to Sandy and Lesley Ross. He first attended Alves Primary School and the state secondary Forres Academy before going on to study agriculture at the Scottish Agricultural College. After graduating, he worked on a dairy farm near Forres, Moray, where his father had been working as a cattleman. He was a member of the Scottish Liberal Democrats in his youth but later became a Conservative voter.

== Early political career ==
Ross began his political career when he took up a post as a parliamentary researcher at the Scottish Parliament. He was first elected to The Moray Council in 2007, representing the Fochabers-Lhanbryde ward, and became part of the Independent/Conservative administration. He resigned from the council administration in December 2009 but continued as a councillor. In 2012, he was re-elected to The Moray Council and again became part of the ruling administration group but was "ousted" from this in 2014, following a debate about school closures.

Ross stood as the Conservative candidate for Moray at the 2010 and 2015 general elections, coming second to Angus Robertson but increased his share of the vote by 5.0% in 2015. He also stood as the Conservative candidate for the Moray Scottish Parliament constituency at the 2011 Scottish Parliament election but finished second to Richard Lochhead. At the 2016 Scottish Parliament election, Ross increased his vote by 18.0% but again finished behind Lochhead. However, he was elected to the Scottish Parliament after being placed first on the Highlands and Islands regional list. He supported the UK remaining within the European Union in the 2016 membership referendum.

Official portraits of Ross as an MP

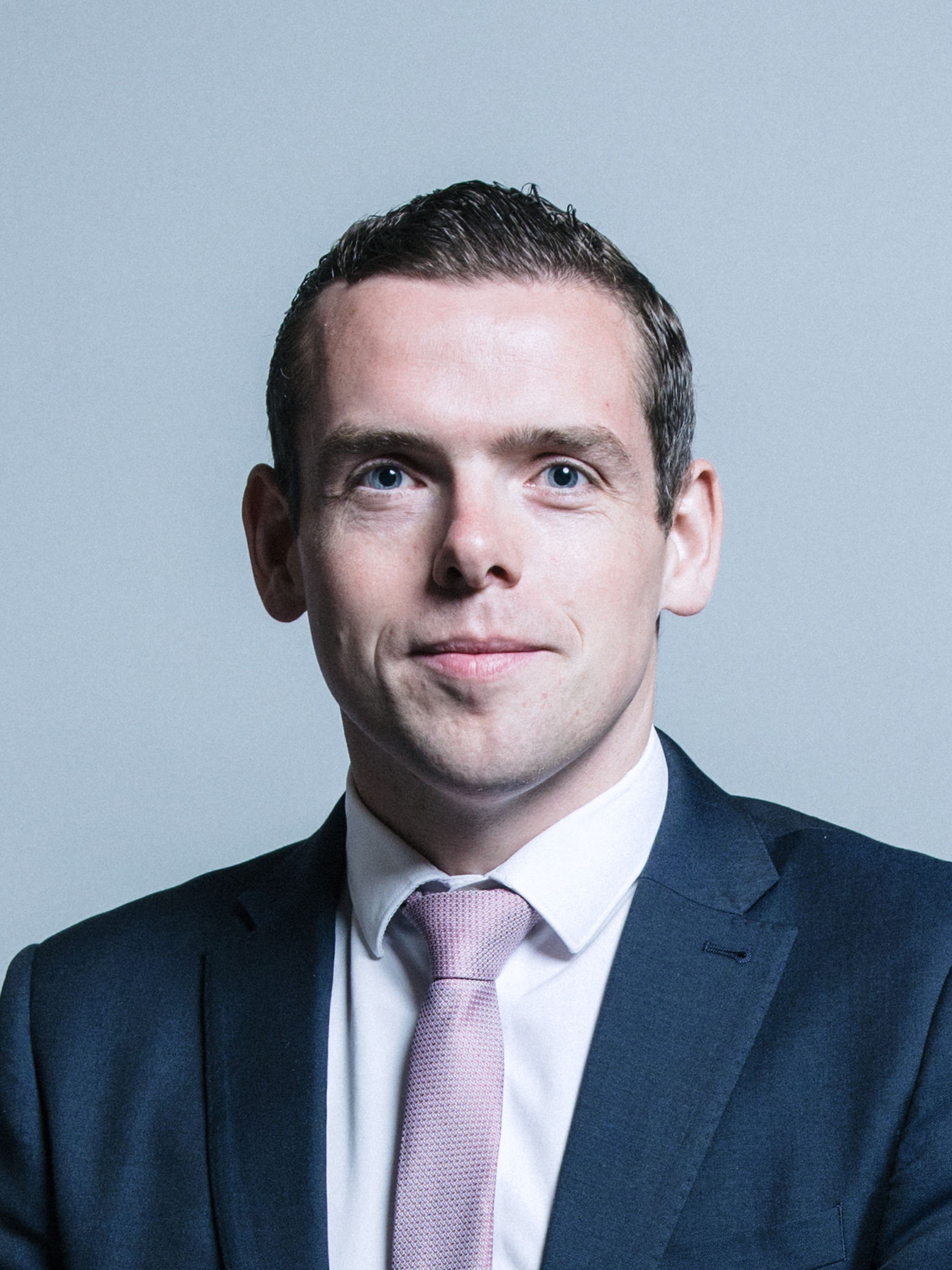
2017

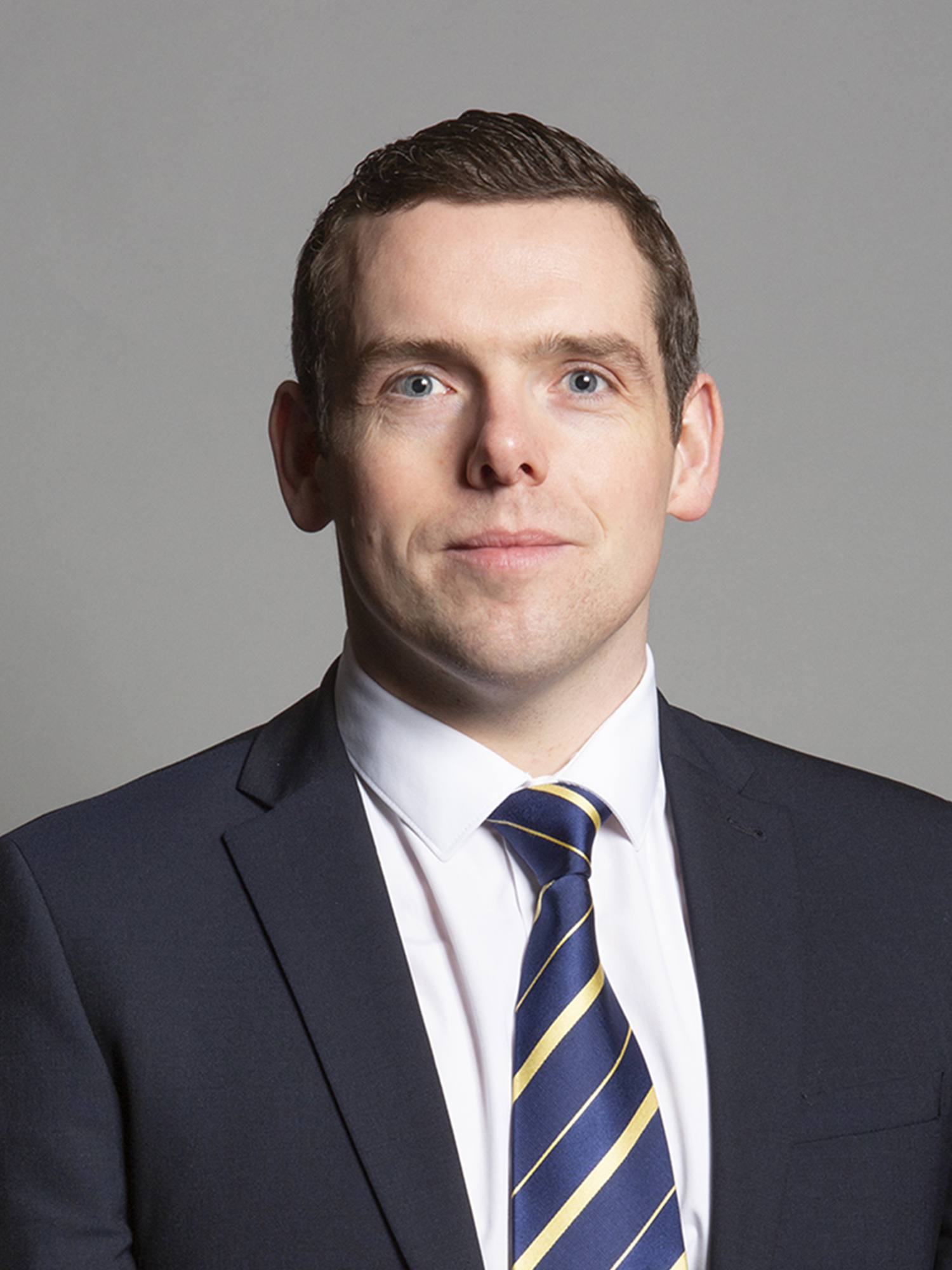
2019

Ross stood again for the seat of Moray at the 2017 general election, challenging SNP deputy leader Angus Robertson. He was successful in overturning Robertson's 9,065 majority with 22,637 votes, 47.6% of the votes cast, gaining a 16.5% swing to the Conservatives. Having gained a seat at Westminster, Ross resigned from his seat in the Scottish Parliament.

In 2017, Ross said during an interview that if he was Prime Minister for a day "without any repercussions", he would "like to see tougher enforcement against Gypsy Travellers". His remark was criticised, including by Naomi McAuliffe of Amnesty International. Ross apologised for his use of language. The Scottish Football Association launched a disciplinary investigation into his remarks, which did not lead to any formal disciplinary action, but warned him to pay attention to his use of language.

SNP and Labour spokespeople criticised Ross for missing a debate on Universal Credit in October 2017, due to his commitments as a football referee. Shortly afterwards, Ross decided he would no longer accept referee appointments while the UK Parliament is sitting.

Despite backing remaining in the EU prior to the referendum, Ross stated Parliament should complete Brexit to "deliver the will of the British people". He voted against Theresa May's Brexit withdrawal agreement at the first round of voting and was absent for the second following his wife going into labour. He supported Mark Harper then subsequently Boris Johnson in the 2019 Conservative Party leadership election.

Ross was re-elected at the 2019 general election with a reduced majority. He was then appointed Parliamentary Under-Secretary of State for Scotland, replacing Colin Clark who had lost his seat in the election. He resigned from this role on 26 May 2020, in protest against Dominic Cummings continuing to serve as Chief Adviser to the Prime Minister after having travelled over 260 miles (420 kilometres) from London to Durham during the COVID-19 lockdown period.

== Leadership of the Scottish Conservatives ==
Ross announced his candidature in the August 2020 Scottish Conservative Party leadership election following Jackson Carlaw's resignation on 30 July 2020. On 5 August, he won the contest unopposed and became leader. On 11 August, he conducted a reshuffle where he made Ruth Davidson the Leader of the Conservative Party in the Scottish Parliament, dismissed Annie Wells and Liam Kerr from their deputy leadership positions and did not give Carlaw a position. As a result of the Alex Salmond parliamentary inquiry in early 2021, Ross called on opposition parties to pass a motion of no confidence against the Scottish Government.

Upon becoming leader, Ross announced plans to run for a seat in the 2021 Scottish Parliament election and succeed Davidson as his party's leader in Holyrood. He was subsequently elected on the Highlands and Islands regional list. The Scottish Conservatives won 31 seats in total, matching their 2016 result and recording the party's highest ever vote share. Following his re-election to the Scottish Parliament, Ross announced his intention to remain MP for Moray while serving as an MSP. The Scottish Parliament website confirms that Ross will donate his MSP salary to charities. Other parties called on him to resign from his MP role.

In October 2021, Ross became the first MP to announce that they would not stand again at the next general election.

In November 2021, Ross referred himself to the parliamentary watchdog after it was revealed he failed to record his salary and earnings as a linesman in his registers of interest at the UK Parliament, all of which amounted to £28,000 not being recorded. He subsequently apologised for his actions and said it was an error on his part however there were also calls for his resignation because of the affair.

In January 2022, after Ross called for the resignation of Prime Minister Boris Johnson amid the Downing Street party scandal, Jacob Rees-Mogg, Leader of the House of Commons, commented: "I don't think Douglas Ross is a big figure. I think Alister Jack is a really serious and senior figure." It was then reported that Ross had sent in a letter of no-confidence in Boris Johnson to the 1922 Committee. Less than two months later, in response to the invasion of Ukraine, Ross announced that he had withdrawn his letter, saying “the middle of an international crisis is not the time to be discussing resignations”. Despite this, he was one of four of the six Scottish Conservative MPs who voted against Johnson in the June confidence vote, though stressed he had not resubmitted his letter.

After poor results in the 2022 Scottish local elections, Ross said he intended to remain as leader. Under him, on 12 October 2023, fellow MP Lisa Cameron defected to the Conservatives, becoming the first elected representative to cross the floor to a unionist party from the Scottish National Party. She cited a "toxic and bullying" culture in her former party that led to her defection hours before the result of her re-election contest.

On 6 June 2024, weeks before the 2024 UK general election, it was announced that Ross would be standing in Aberdeenshire North and Moray East. David Duguid, since 2017 the MP for the predecessor seat, had been "deselected" the night before despite being previously adopted as the candidate. Duguid, who would miss out on a £14,700 redundancy as a result, was in hospital at the time, but said he had been "looking forward to campaigning" in the election. Ross was criticised by members of his party, and by other parties, for the move. On 10 June 2024, Ross announced that he would resign as leader of the Scottish Conservatives following the 2024 general election, and also as an MSP if he was re-elected as MP in the election. He was not elected, being defeated by the SNP's Seamus Logan who took the seat with a majority of 942 votes.

== Post-leadership ==
In March 2025, Ross announced that he would be standing down as an MSP at the 2026 Scottish Parliament election, in order to focus on his campaign for the next general election, due in 2029.

== Policies and views ==
In line with the Scottish Conservatives, Ross supports British unionism and is opposed to a second referendum on Scottish independence. Following his election as leader of the Scottish Conservative Party, Ross stated that he wanted to represent "working-class unionists in Scotland." However, he has also criticised what he views as too much centralisation around London and has expressed support for some federalist ideas, including House of Lords reform. In the run-up to the 2021 Scottish Parliament election, Ross proposed a "pro-UK, anti-referendum coalition" with other Scottish unionist parties although this was not supported by Scottish Labour.

Ross backed Remain during the EU referendum, but after the vote he stated Parliament should complete Brexit to "deliver the will of the British people". He voted against Theresa May's Brexit withdrawal agreement at the first round of voting and was absent for the second following his wife going into labour. During the 2019 Conservative Party leadership election, Ross initially endorsed Mark Harper before backing Boris Johnson in the final round.

Ross has also expressed support for power of recall in the Scottish parliament, and, in 2021, proposed what he called "Mackay's Law" (named after former SNP Finance Minister Derek Mackay), whereby MSPs who have not shown up for work for over six months but still collect pay must be forced to resign.

On 29 May 2025, Ross conducted various television interviews questioning the neutrality of the current Scottish Parliament's Presiding Officer, Alison Johnstone, following his expulsion from Parliament for continual disruptive behaviour.

== Football referee ==
A qualified football official, Ross is a top-level assistant referee in his spare time. He was one of the officials for the 2015 Scottish Cup Final, assisting Willie Collum, and the 2018 Scottish Cup Final, assisting Kevin Clancy. He has run the line in several editions of Scotland's biggest club fixture, the Old Firm Derby, and has been involved in continental UEFA Champions League and UEFA Europa League ties and international FIFA World Cup and UEFA European Championship qualifiers. He continued his refereeing career after being elected to the Scottish Parliament and also officiated matches whilst an MP in the UK House of Commons.

In the House of Commons Register of Members' Interests, Ross declared earnings of more than £2,700 in August and September 2017 for his work as an assistant referee. In October of that year, Ross told the football authorities that he would no longer accept refereeing appointments during the week while the UK Parliament is sitting. By December 2017, his declared income from 20 domestic and international games since becoming an MP was more than £11,000.

In December 2018, BBC Sport reported that Ross had reduced the number of refereeing appointments due to his work commitments as an MP. At this time, he also argued that the Scottish Football Association should not appoint fully professional referees.

In August 2020, Ross apologised for not attending a VJ Day event as a result of previously agreeing to officiate at a Scottish Premiership game between Kilmarnock and St Johnstone. Ross said he would donate his match fee to the charity Help for Heroes. In October 2020, he was a linesman at Wembley for England's 3–0 friendly win against Wales.

In November 2020, FIFA were asked to investigate a complaint by a member of the Scottish Football Supporters Association that a Conservative Party leaflet distributed to homes in Scotland included a photograph of Ross as a match official.

Ross stopped officiating games in January 2021 due to injury. He resumed his refereeing career in July 2022, while both Holyrood and Westminster were in recess.

== Personal life ==
Ross married Krystle in 2015. They have two sons, one who was born in 2019, and another in 2021.

== Notes ==
Parliament of the United Kingdom
Preceded by Angus Robertson	Member of Parliament for Moray; 2017–2024	Constituency abolished
Party political offices
Preceded by Jackson Carlaw	Leader of the Scottish Conservative Party; 2020–2024	Succeeded by Russell Findlay
