= Scottish Conservatives =

Scottish branch of the UK Conservative Party

Scottish Conservative and Unionist Party Pàrtaidh Tòraidheach na h-Alba (Note: In Scottish Gaelic, the party name is rendered by the Scottish Parliament as Pàrtaidh Tòraidheach na h-Alba, drawn from Tory rather than a direct translation.)
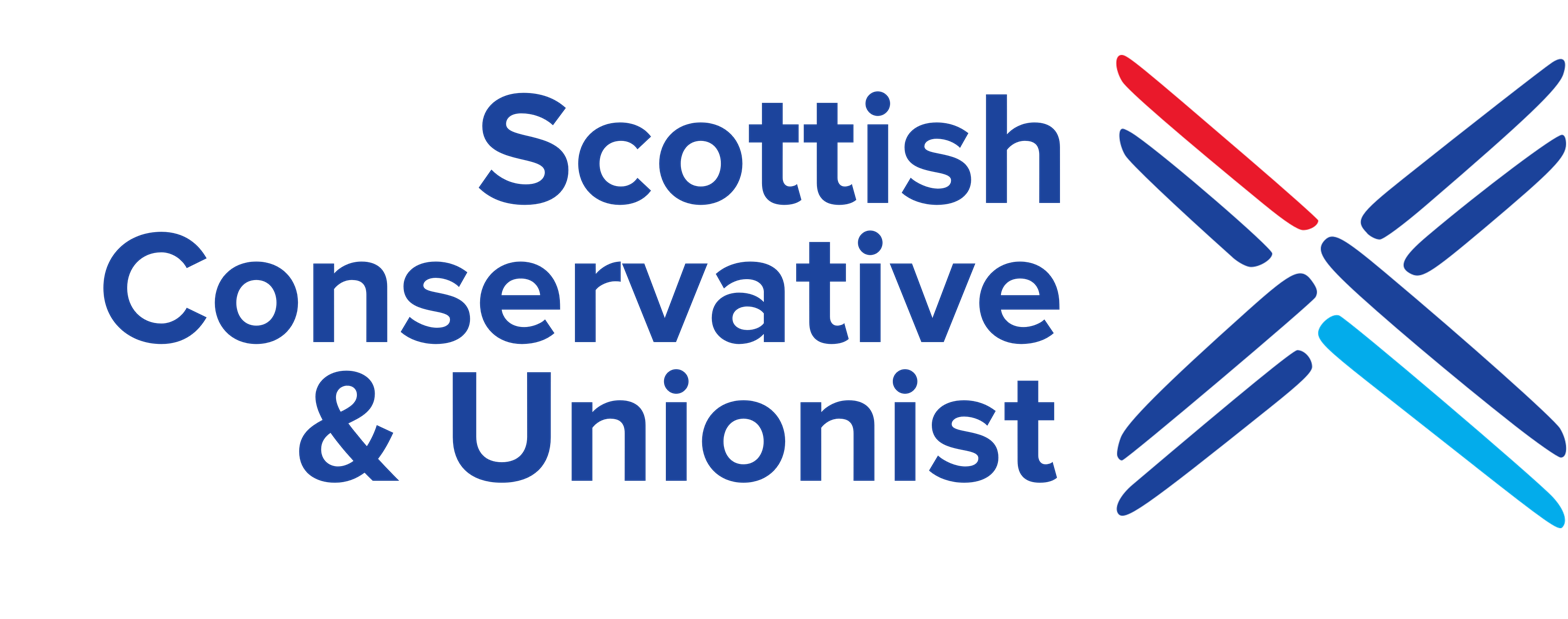
- Leader: Russell Findlay
- Deputy Leader: Rachael Hamilton
- Chair: Alasdair Locke
- Founded: 24 April 1965; 61 years ago
- Preceded by: Unionist Party
- Headquarters: 67 Northumberland Street, Edinburgh
- Youth wing: Scottish Young Conservatives
- Membership (2024): 7,000
- Ideology: Conservatism (British); British unionism; Economic liberalism
- Political position: Centre-right to right-wing
- National affiliation: Conservatives
- Colours: Blue
- House of Commons: 6 / 57 (Scottish seats)
- Scottish Parliament: 12 / 129
- Councillors: 173 / 1,226
- Councils led in Scotland: 5 / 32

Election symbol

Website
- www.scottishconservatives.com

The Scottish Conservative and Unionist Party (Scottish Gaelic: Pàrtaidh Tòraidheach na h-Alba), is part of the UK Conservative Party active in Scotland. It currently holds 6 of the 57 Scottish seats in the House of Commons, 12 of the 129 seats in the Scottish Parliament, and comprises 176 of Scotland's 1,226 local councillors. The Scottish Conservative party has no separate Chief Whip at Westminster. The party's policies in Scotland promote conservatism and the continuation of Scotland as part of the United Kingdom.

The Leader of the Scottish Conservative Party is Russell Findlay who was elected to the role in September 2024. The party campaigns in elections to the UK Parliament, Scottish Parliament and local government. The party evolved in its present structure from the Unionist Party which existed from 1912 to 1965, combining elements from the pre-1912 Conservative Party in Scotland and the Liberal Unionists. Gradually entering local government from the 1960s, the party replaced previous local groupings of Progressives and Moderates.

The party faced a decline in the latter half of the 20th century, reaching an electoral low-point in the 1997 UK election and returning no Members of Parliament. The Scottish Conservatives enjoyed a temporary revival following the 2014 Scottish independence referendum, surpassing Scottish Labour as the leading unionist party in the 2017 and 2019 UK elections, 2016 and 2021 Scottish Parliament elections, and 2017 Scottish local elections. However, the party suffered significant losses in the most recent elections to the UK parliament in 2024, the Scottish Parliament in 2026, and local authorities in 2022.

== History ==
=== Scottish Conservatism pre-1912 ===
Before 1912, the Conservative Party operated in Scotland. With the emergence of mass party political groups in the second half of the 19th century, distinct organisations emerged in Scotland. The voluntary party organisation, the National Union of Conservative Associations for Scotland (mirroring the National Union of Conservative Associations), emerged in 1882, creating a distinct Conservative conference in Scotland.

A previous organisation, the Scottish National Constitutional Association, existed from 1867, with the patronage of UK party leader Benjamin Disraeli. The Scotsman newspaper reported that following the 1874 election "Conservative Clubs and Working Men's Conservative Associations have spring up like mushrooms in all parts of [Scotland]".

From the Representation of the People Act 1884 until 1918, the Liberal Party was the dominant political force in Scotland, operating in a largely two-party system with the Scottish Conservatives. In 1886, the Liberal Unionists had broken away from the Liberal Party in opposition to William Gladstone's proposals for Irish Home Rule. Joint Liberal Unionist and Conservative candidates were run across the United Kingdom, but with the organisations of these parties remaining separate.

=== The Unionist Party (1912–1965) ===
Logo of the Scottish Unionist Association

Following the merger of the Conservatives and Liberal Unionists to create the modern Conservative and Unionist Party in England and Wales, a committee was formed of the National Union of Conservative Associations for Scotland and regional Liberal Unionist associations which recommended a merger in Scotland. This was agreed in December 1912, creating the Scottish Unionist Association and the Unionist Party.

From 1918 and through the 1920s, the Labour Party became more prominent, displacing the Liberals as one of the two main parties in Scottish politics. The Unionist Party had a number of electoral successes, topping the poll in Scotland in a number of elections from the 1930s to 1950s. During the period of its existence, the Unionist Party produced two Prime Ministers of the United Kingdom – Bonar Law and Alec Douglas-Home – and uniquely among parties in the post-war period, achieved more than half of the popular vote within Scotland in the 1931 general election and 1955 general election. The majority of the vote achieved in these two General Elections was combined with the National Liberal Party who later merged with the Conservative and Unionist Party in 1968 alongside the Unionist Party which had already merged into the Conservative and Unionist Party in 1965.

While taking the Conservative whip in the House of Commons, the Unionist Party had a lengthy "unionist-nationalist" tradition, emphasising its Scottish identity within the United Kingdom and the British Empire. This was represented by elected members such as John Buchan (who said "I believe every Scotsman should be a Scottish nationalist") and those former Unionists who in 1932 founded the pro-home rule Scottish Party (which later merged with the National Party of Scotland to form the Scottish National Party).

=== Scottish Conservative and Unionist Party ===
Following a decline in performance, coming second to the Labour Party in seats though first in votes at the 1959 general election and both votes and seats at the 1964 general election, the Unionist Party proposed a number of reforms which involved amalgamation with the Conservative and Unionist Party in England and Wales – formally taking place on 24 April 1965. The modern Scottish Conservative and Unionist Party, as part of the wider UK Conservative Party, came into existence from this point.

However its electoral fortunes continued to decline throughout the 1960s. Following Harold Wilson's failure to obtain a Labour majority in February 1974, a second general election was held in October of the same year which saw the party decline to below 25% of the vote and drop from 21 seats to 16. At the same time, the SNP were to gain an unprecedented 11 MPs, unseating a number of Conservative MPs in rural constituencies.

The party's fortunes recovered somewhat in 1979 under the leadership of Margaret Thatcher, but her tenure as Prime Minister was to see the party's fortunes drop further from holding 22 seats in 1979 to 10 in 1987. The party increased its share of the vote and number of MPs to 11 in 1992 under John Major's leadership before dropping to 17.5% of the popular vote and failing to have any MPs returned from Scotland in 1997. It continued to return only a single MP from Scottish constituencies at the 2001, 2005, 2010 and 2015 general elections, before winning 13 seats in 2017.

Following the 2010 general election performance, the party commissioned a review under Lord Sanderson of Bowden to consider the party's future organisation. The Sanderson Commission's report recommended a single Scottish leader (replacing a leader of the Scottish Parliamentary group), reforms to governance and constituency structures, the creation of regional campaigning centres, greater focus on policy development and a new membership and fundraising drive.

=== Scottish devolution ===
Former logo of the Scottish Conservatives, used until 2006

The party's commitments to a devolved Scottish Assembly were to decline under the leadership of Margaret Thatcher. Previously the party had offered some support for a Scottish Assembly, including in the so-called Declaration of Perth in 1968 under UK party leader Edward Heath. John Major, while endorsing further powers for the Scottish Grand Committee and the Scottish Office did not support a devolved parliament. With the Labour Party's victory in 1997, referendums on devolution were organised in Scotland and Wales, both receiving agreement that devolved legislatures should be formed.

In 1999, the first elections to a devolved Scottish Parliament were held. Following the Conservatives electoral wipe-out in Scotland in 1997, devolution provided the party with a number of parliamentary representatives in Scotland. Less than a year following the first Scottish Parliament election, a 2000 by-election was held in the Ayr constituency with John Scott winning the seat from Labour.

In the party leadership elections in 2011, the previous deputy leader Murdo Fraser proposed disbanding the party and creating a new Scottish party of the centre-right, similar to the previous Unionist Party and compared this arrangement to the relationship between the Christian Social Union in Bavaria and the Christian Democratic Union in Germany. The move was opposed by the other three candidates. Victory went to the newly elected MSP Ruth Davidson who suggested that she would oppose further devolution beyond the new powers proposed by the Calman Commission.

The party was one of the three main Scottish political parties to join in the Better Together campaign opposing Scotland becoming independent in the 2014 Scottish independence referendum. Although a Conservative majority government was returned in Westminster in the 2015 general election, David Mundell remained their only MP elected in Scotland and was appointed Secretary of State for Scotland. He replaced Liberal Democrat incumbents who served during the 2010–15 Coalition government. The UK Government set about implementing the recommendations of the cross-party Smith Commission.

=== Recent elections ===
==== 2011 Scottish Parliament election ====
Annabel Goldie led the party into the 2011 Scottish Parliament election, having successfully campaigned in budget negotiations with the minority SNP Scottish Government for a number of concessions over the 2007–11 Scottish Parliament. This had resulted in commitments to 1,000 extra police officers, four-year council tax freeze and £60m town regeneration fund.

The election saw the SNP win a majority and the Scottish Conservatives were reduced from 17 seats to 15, losing the Edinburgh Pentlands constituency to the SNP, seeing notional loses in Eastwood and Dumfriesshire to Labour. Following the election, Annabel Goldie resigned as leader and a leadership election was held in November 2011 – the first to appoint a Leader of the Scottish Conservatives, rather than the Scottish Parliament group, as required by the Sanderson Commission. Ruth Davidson was returned, beating the original front-runner and former deputy leader Murdo Fraser.

Davidson drove forward a number of the Sanderson Commission's reforms, including replacing the party's Banyan (or Indian Fig) tree logo with a "union saltire".

==== 2015 UK general election ====
The Conservatives made little advance at the 2015 UK general election, with Scotland's sole Conservative MP David Mundell holding on to his Dumfriesshire, Clydesdale and Tweeddale constituency with a reduced majority of just 798 votes ahead of the SNP's Emma Harper. The Conservatives made no seat gains at the election in Scotland, with target seats such as Argyll and Bute; West Aberdeenshire and Kincardine; and Angus being won by the SNP (who won all but 3 Scottish seats). The party did however come close in Berwickshire, Roxburgh and Selkirk where MSP John Lamont was only 328 votes behind the SNP's Calum Kerr: this was the most marginal result in Scotland and the eighth most marginal result in the United Kingdom.

==== 2016 Scottish Parliament election ====
Conservative share of the constituency vote by constituency in the 2016 election.

At the 2016 Scottish Parliament election, the Scottish Conservative campaign focused on providing strong opposition to the SNP government in Scotland, opposing calls for a second referendum on Scottish independence. The party manifesto focused on freezing business tax rates to promote economic growth and greater employment opportunities; investing in mental health treatment over the course of the next parliament; a commitment to building 100,000 affordable homes within 5 years and a re-introduction of the Right to Buy scheme in Scotland. The Scottish Conservatives were the only major party in Scotland to oppose higher taxes to the rest of the United Kingdom during the campaign as tax reductions came in force across the rest of the UK which were opposed by the SNP, Labour and Liberal Democrats.

At the election the party saw major gains, particularly on the regional list vote. The Conservatives doubled their representation in the Scottish Parliament by taking 31 seats (compared to 15 in 2011), making them the leading opposition party in the Scottish Parliament ahead of Scottish Labour. On the constituency element of the vote the Conservatives held on to their three first past the post constituency seats (Ayr; Ettrick, Roxburgh and Berwickshire and Galloway and West Dumfries), making gains in Aberdeenshire West; Dumfriesshire; Eastwood and Edinburgh Central, where party leader Ruth Davidson stood for election. This marked the party's best electoral performance in Scotland since the 1992 UK general election.

==== 2017 UK general election ====
Conservative share of the vote by constituency in the 2017 election.

Campaigning in opposition to proposals put forward by Nicola Sturgeon and the Scottish Parliament for a second referendum on Scottish independence to be held following the United Kingdom's decision to leave the European Union in a referendum held in 2016 which was not supported by a majority of Scottish voters, the Scottish Conservatives had their best ever election in Scotland in seat terms since 1983 at the 2017 general election. The Conservatives gained 12 MP's in Scotland to give them 13 in total. The party had their largest vote share in a general election in Scotland since 1979, taking a total of 757,949 votes (28.6%) in Scotland.

David Mundell held on to his Dumfriesshire, Clydesdale and Tweeddale seat with an increased majority of 9,441 votes (19.3%). The party also gained the Ayr, Carrick and Cumnock; Berwickshire, Roxburgh and Selkirk; and Dumfries and Galloway constituencies to the south of the country, and gained East Renfrewshire on the outskirts of Glasgow.

The Conservatives also took a majority of seats in the North East of Scotland, gaining former First Minister of Scotland Alex Salmond's Gordon constituency, alongside Moray, the seat of the SNP's Westminster leader Angus Robertson. Other gains for the party in the North East included Aberdeen South; Angus; Banff and Buchan; and West Aberdeenshire and Kincardine. The party took the Ochil and South Perthshire; and Stirling constituencies in central Scotland and missed out to the SNP in Perth and North Perthshire by just 21 votes.

==== 2019 European elections ====
The Scottish Conservatives retained their single seat in the European Parliament at the 2019 European Parliament election. Incumbent MEP Nosheena Mobarik was reelected.

==== 2019 UK general election ====
On 29 August 2019, Davidson stood down citing several political and personal reasons for her decision to resign as leader.

The Scottish Conservatives lost more than half of their seats in Scotland to the Scottish National Party in the December 2019 general election, with a 3.5% swing away from the party. The lost seats were Aberdeen South; Angus; Ayr, Carrick and Cumnock; East Renfrewshire; Gordon; Ochil and South Perthshire; and Stirling.

==== 2021 Scottish Parliament election ====
Douglas Ross led the Scottish Conservatives into the 2021 Scottish Parliament election. The party lost two constituencies it was defending (Ayr and Edinburgh Central) to the SNP but retained the remainder of its constituency seats with an increased vote share in some which political analysts attributed in-part to tactical voting from Unionists and credited this with preventing the SNP from gaining an overall majority. The Scottish Conservatives also came close to winning Banffshire and Buchan Coast. The party also saw its highest result to date on the regional list with 23.5% of the vote, while losing 0.1% in the constituency vote. The Scottish Conservatives ultimately obtained 31 seats, the same as their result in the 2016 election, and remained in opposition at Holyrood.

==== 2022 Scottish local elections ====
The Scottish Conservatives lost 63 seats at the 2022 Scottish local elections, shedding 5.6% of the vote and taking their total first preference vote to 19.7% in what was their worst performance electorally in nearly a decade. Some of their heaviest loses occurred in Glasgow, where their total representation went from 8 councillors to 2, and Perth & Kinross, where they lost 3 councillors and control of the council to the Scottish National Party. They also lost control of East Dunbartonshire and Angus, where they were in coalition with the Scottish Liberal Democrats, again to the Scottish National Party, who attracted a record share of the vote and councillors across Scotland. Douglas Ross blamed the poor performance on Partygate, while others said his leadership was partly to blame, due to his unclear stance on whether he supported Boris Johnson remaining in office or not.

Following the 2022 local elections, the Scottish Conservatives fortunes did not turn around. Much like the UK wide Conservative Party, the party struggled with low polling following Boris Johnson and Liz Truss' premiership controversies, with two polls in December 2022 showing support for the party plummeting to 13%, behind Scottish Labour who were averaging 25% and the Scottish National Party averaging 50%, along with rising support for Scottish Independence. Douglas Ross' leadership authority suffered due to him u-turning on a number of policies, including scrapping the 45p tax rate, which he supported then supported the scrapping of the policy. Scottish Conservative MSP's were reported to have wanted to oust him due to the low polling and multiple u-turns, but it was subsequently revealed there isn't a mechanism in place for the Scottish Conservatives to oust their leader.

Some Scottish Conservatives supported Boris Johnson, but Douglas Ross called on him to resign.

On 12 October 2023, MP Lisa Cameron defected to the Conservatives, becoming the first elected representative to cross the floor to a unionist party from the SNP. She cited a "toxic and bullying" culture in her former party that led to her defection.

==== 2024 UK general election ====
In the 2024 general election, the Scottish Conservatives performed poorly across Scotland with 16 lost election deposits. This included every constituency in the city of Glasgow. Their vote share across Scotland was almost halved, down 12.3 percentage points to 12.9%. The Leader of the Scottish Conservatives Douglas Ross lost his seat to the SNP.

==== 2026 Scottish Parliament election ====
In the 2026 Scottish Parliament election, the Scottish Conservatives suffered their worst ever defeat. They fell from second place to fifth place with 12 MSPs. The party lost many votes to Reform UK Scotland. Russell Findlay said he will stay on as leader.

==== 2026 Aberdeen South By-Election ====
On 18th June 2026 Douglas Lumsden of the Scottish Conservatives won the 2026 Aberdeen South by-election, regaining the Westminster seat of Aberdeen South from the Scottish National Party. This was the first by-election gain of a Westminster seat by the Scottish Conservatives for more than fifty years. It increased the total number of Scottish Conservative MPs to 6. The Scottish Conservatives came second behind the SNP in the 2026 Arbroath and Broughty Ferry by-election held on the same day.

== Policies and ideology ==
The Scottish Conservatives are a centre-right to right-wing, conservative political party, with a commitment to Scotland remaining a part of the United Kingdom. It is autonomous from the UK Conservative Party in its leadership, internal structure and the creation of policy in devolved areas. In August 2006, the-then Leader of the Conservative Party, David Cameron, said that the party should recognise "that the policies of Conservatives in Scotland and Wales will not always be the same as our policies in England" and that the "West Lothian question must be answered from a Unionist perspective". Presently, the Scottish Conservatives refer to themselves as a "patriotic, unionist party of the Scottish centre-right" that stands for "Scotland's place in the UK, equal opportunity, enterprise and growth, localism and community and the rights of victims and the police in our justice system."

Although aligned to the UK-wide Conservatives, it has in certain areas adopted different policy positions. Following the Sutherland Report in 1999, the party voted with the Scottish Executive in 2002 to introduce free personal care for the elderly funded from general taxation.

Like Scottish Labour and the Scottish Liberal Democrats, the Scottish Conservatives are opposed to Scottish independence but have often been regarded as the most staunchly pro-Unionist of the three parties. Generally, the Scottish Conservatives favour a more business friendly environment in Scotland, increase funding for the police and frontline workers, enact stricter law & order policies to tackle violent crime, drug and alcohol misuse, and give more support to Scotland's rural communities. The party has evolved to support Scottish devolution but has argued successive SNP administrations in Scotland have not made a constructive use of devolved powers to benefit ordinary people and have encouraged waste or corruption through devolution. Although opposed to policies that could further Scottish independence, the Scottish Conservatives support aspects of financial devolution and devolving more powers to local communities in Scotland.

The Scottish Conservative position on devolution in the United Kingdom has changed over time. At the 2019 general election, the Scottish Conservatives pledged opposition to a proposed second Scottish independence referendum, delivering on Brexit and to strengthen the United Kingdom. They lost half their seats at the election. In 2021, ahead of the Scottish Parliament elections, the party argued that Scotland should focus on economic recovery following the COVID-19 pandemic.

== Party organisation ==
The Party is governed by a Party Management Board convened by the Party Chairman, currently Alasdair Locke. The management board also consists of the party leader, conference convener, honorary secretary, treasurer and three regional conveners representing the north, east and west of Scotland areas. These are:

- Alasdair Locke, Chairman of the Scottish Conservative & Unionist Party
- Russell Findlay MSP, Leader of the Scottish Conservative & Unionist Party
- Leonard Wallace, Honorary Secretary
- Guy Stenhouse, Treasurer
- Charles Kennedy, National Convener
- Anne Connell, East of Scotland Regional Convener
- Craig Miller, North of Scotland Regional Convener
- John Scott OBE, West of Scotland Regional Convener

The party leader is elected by members on a one-member-one-vote basis, with the chairman appointed by the Scottish leader after consultation with the UK party leader. The Conference convener is a voluntary officer elected by members at the party's annual conference who must have been a former regional convener, and is responsible for chairing the conference and the party's convention.

=== Leader of the Scottish Conservative Party ===
The position of Leader of the Scottish Conservative Party was created in 2011. The new position of Scottish party leader was created following the recommendations of the Sanderson Commission. The position of leader is currently held by Russell Findlay

No.	Portrait	Name	Term start	Term end
1		Ruth Davidson	4 November 2011	29 August 2019
Jackson Carlaw was interim leader during this period
2		Jackson Carlaw	14 February 2020	30 July 2020
3		Douglas Ross	5 August 2020	27 September 2024
4		Russell Findlay	27 September 2024	Incumbent

=== Leader of the Scottish Conservative Party in the Scottish Parliament ===
The position of Leader of the Scottish Conservative Party in the Scottish Parliament was originally created in 1999 and used until 2011 when the position of Leader of the Scottish Conservative Party was created. However, as a result of Douglas Ross being appointed as Leader of the Scottish Conservative Party in August 2020 and then not being a MSP but instead being an MP within the House of Commons, Ruth Davidson took on the role of Leader of the Scottish Conservative Party in the Scottish Parliament at First Ministers Questions.

No.	Portrait	Name	Term start	Term end
1		David McLetchie	6 September 1998	31 October 2005
Annabel Goldie was interim leader during this period
2		Annabel Goldie	8 November 2005	4 November 2011
3		Ruth Davidson	11 August 2020	5 May 2021

=== Deputy Leader of the Scottish Conservative Party ===
The position of Deputy Chairman of the Scottish Conservative Party was held by Jackson Carlaw from 1992 to 1998 and Annabel Goldie from 1998 until her election as leader in 2005, after which the position listed below was created. The deputy leadership position was abolished shortly after Douglas Ross was appointed Scottish Conservative leader but was reinstated following on from the Scottish Conservative's poor performance at the 2022 Scottish local elections where Meghan Gallacher was given the position.

No.	Portrait	Name	Term start	Term end
1		Murdo Fraser	31 October 2005	10 November 2011
2		Jackson Carlaw	10 November 2011	3 September 2019
3		Liam Kerr	3 September 2019	12 August 2020
4		Annie Wells	14 February 2020	12 August 2020
5		Meghan Gallacher	9 May 2022	16 August 2024
6		Rachael Hamilton	28 September 2024	Incumbent

=== Central staff ===
The party's registered headquarters is at Scottish Conservative Central Office (SCCO), 67 Northumberland Street, Edinburgh. Between 2001 and 2010, SCCO was housed in an office on Princes Street.

The party's central staff is headed by the Director of the Party, currently James Tweedie, who serves as its chief executive. There are also three campaign managers appointed to three defined regions of Scotland.

== Scottish Parliament Shadow Cabinet ==
The front bench formulates the party's policy on issues devolved to the Scottish Parliament.

Member of the Scottish Parliament	Constituency or Region	First elected	Current Role
Russell Findlay	West Scotland	2021	Leader of the Scottish Conservative & Unionist Party
Rachael Hamilton	Ettrick, Roxburgh and Berwickshire	2016	Deputy Leader of the Scottish Conservative & Unionist Party
Murdo Fraser	Mid Scotland and Fife	2001	Shadow Cabinet Secretary for Business, Economy, Tourism and Culture
Craig Hoy	Lothian	2021	Shadow Cabinet Secretary for Finance and Local Government
Douglas Lumsden	North East Scotland	2021	Shadow Cabinet Secretary for Net Zero and Energy
Sandesh Gulhane	Glasgow	2021	Shadow Cabinet Secretary for Health and Social Care
Liam Kerr	North East Scotland	2016	Shadow Cabinet Secretary for Justice
Liz Smith	Mid Scotland and Fife	2007	Shadow Cabinet Secretary for Social Security
Miles Briggs	Lothian	2016	Shadow Cabinet Secretary for Education and Skills
Tim Eagle	Highlands and Islands	2024	Shadow Cabinet Secretary for Rural Affairs, Land Reform and Fishing
Sue Webber	Lothian	2021	Shadow Cabinet Secretary for Transport
Meghan Gallacher	Central Scotland	2021	Shadow Cabinet Secretary for Housing
Alexander Burnett	Aberdeenshire West	2016	Chief Whip

== Appointments ==
=== House of Lords ===
No.	Name	Date Ennobled
1.	Earl of Caithness	1970 (Hereditary)
2.	Lord Glenarthur	1977 (Hereditary)
3.	Earl of Dundee	1983 (Hereditary)
4.	Lord Strathclyde	1986 (Hereditary)
5.	Earl of Lindsay	1990 (Hereditary)
6.	Duke of Montrose	1995 (Hereditary)
7.	Earl of Home	1996 (Hereditary)
8.	Lord Selkirk of Douglas	1997
9.	Lord Lamont of Lerwick	1998
10.	Lord Forsyth of Drumlean	1999
11.	Earl Cathcart	2007 (Hereditary)
12.	Viscount Younger of Leckie	2010 (Hereditary)
13.	Lord Livingston of Parkhead	2013
14.	Baroness Goldie	2013
15.	Baroness Mobarik	2014
16.	Lord Keen of Elie	2015
17.	Lord Fairfax of Cameron	2015 (Hereditary)
18.	Lord Duncan of Springbank	2017
19.	Lord Stewart of Dirleton	2020
20.	Baroness Fraser of Craigmaddie	2021
21.	Baroness Davidson of Lundin Links	2021
22.	Lord Offord of Garvel	2021
23.	Lord Douglas-Miller	2023
24.	Lord Cameron of Lochiel	2024
25.	Lord Jack of Courance	2025
26.	Lord Gove	2025

== Election results ==
In 2017, the Scottish Conservatives became the second-largest political party in Scotland in terms of democratic representation in the Scottish Parliament (following the 2016 Scottish Parliament election), constituencies in Scotland in the UK House of Commons (following the 2017 snap election) and in local government in Scotland (following the 2017 local elections), finishing in second place behind the Scottish National Party and overtaking the once dominant Scottish Labour.

=== House of Commons ===
Blue indicates the seats won by the Conservatives at the 2024 United Kingdom general election in Scotland.

Election	Leader		Scotland					Government
Election	(Scotland)	(United Kingdom)	Votes	%	Seats	+/–	Pos.	Government
1835		Robert Peel	15,733	37.2	15 / 53	▲5	2nd	Opposition
1837		Robert Peel	18,569	46.0	20 / 53	▲5	2nd	Opposition
1841		Robert Peel	9,793	38.3	20 / 53	Steady	2nd	Majority (Note: Majority government (1841–1846); Opposition (1846–1847).)
1847		Earl of Derby	3,509	18.3	20 / 53	Steady	2nd	Opposition (Note: Opposition (1847–1852); Minority government (1852).)
1852		Earl of Derby	6,955	27.4	20 / 53	Steady	2nd	Majority (Note: Minority government (1852); Opposition (1852–1857).)
1857		Earl of Derby	4,060	15.2	14 / 53	▼6	2nd	Opposition (Note: Opposition (1857–1858); Minority government (1858–1859).)
1859		Earl of Derby	2,616	33.6	13 / 53	▼1	2nd	Minority (Note: Minority government (1859); Opposition (1859–1865).)
1865		Earl of Derby	4,305	14.6	11 / 53	▼2	2nd	Opposition (Note: Opposition (1865–1866); Minority government (1866–1868).)
1868 (Note: Figures include the Scottish university constituencies of Edinburgh and St Andrews Universities and Glasgow and Aberdeen Universities.)		Benjamin Disraeli	28,072	17.8	7 / 60	▼4	2nd	Opposition
1874		Benjamin Disraeli	63,193	29.9	20 / 60	▲13	2nd	Majority
1880		Benjamin Disraeli	80,113	28.7	8 / 60	▼12	2nd	Opposition (Note: Opposition (1880–1885); Minority government (1885).)
1885		Lord Salisbury	153,977	34.1	10 / 72	▲2	2nd	Minority (Note: Minority government (1885–1886); Opposition (1886).)
1886 (Note: Figures include the Liberal Unionist Party, as well as the Scottish university constituencies of Edinburgh and St Andrews Universities and Glasgow and Aberdeen Universities.)		Lord Salisbury	164,314	45.9	29 / 72	▲19	2nd	Con–Liberal Unionist
1892		Lord Salisbury	209,944	44.2	21 / 72	▼8	2nd	Minority (Note: Minority government (1892); Opposition (1892–1895).)
1895		Lord Salisbury	214,403	47.0	33 / 72	▲12	2nd	Con–Liberal Unionist
1900		Lord Salisbury	237,217	48.8	38 / 72	▲5	▲1st	Con–Liberal Unionist (Note: Majority government (1900–1905); Opposition (1905–1906).)
1906		Arthur Balfour	234,238	38.3	12 / 72	▼26	▼2nd	Opposition
1910 Jan		Arthur Balfour	270,117	39.9	11 / 72	▼1	2nd	Opposition
1910 Dec		Arthur Balfour	244,785	42.4	12 / 72	▲1	2nd	Opposition (Note: Opposition (1910–1915); Coalition government (1915–1916).)
1918 (Note: Figures include the Coalition Unionists, non-coalition Unionists, and the Combined Scottish Universities constituency. Figures exclude other members of the Coalition including the Coalition Liberals, Coalition Labour, and Coalition National Democratic Party (NDP).)		Bonar Law	365,474	32.1	34 / 74	▲22	▲1st	Coalition Lib–Con
1922 (Note: Figures include the Combined Scottish Universities constituency.)		Bonar Law	379,396	25.1	15 / 74	▼19	▼3rd	Majority
1923		Stanley Baldwin	468,526	31.6	16 / 74	▲1	3rd	Opposition
1924		Stanley Baldwin	699,268	40.3	38 / 74	▲22	▲1st	Majority
1929		Stanley Baldwin	807,777	35.6	22 / 74	▼16	▼2nd	Opposition
1931 (Note: Figures include the Combined Scottish Universities constituency. Figures exclude other members of the National Government including the National Liberals, Liberals, National Labour, and candidates standing under the National Government label.)		Stanley Baldwin	1,056,768	48.6	50 / 74	▲28	▲1st	Con–Lib–National Labour
1935 (Note: Figures include the Combined Scottish Universities constituency. Figures exclude other members of the National Government including the National Liberals, National Labour, and candidates standing under the National Government label.)		Stanley Baldwin	978,326	41.6	37 / 72	▼13	1st	Con–Lib–National Labour
1945		Winston Churchill	879,567	36.3	25 / 74	▼12	▼2nd	Opposition
1950 (Note: Figures include the National Liberals, which merged with the Conservative and Unionist Party in 1947.)		Winston Churchill	1,222,010	44.8	31 / 70	▲3 (Note: Notional change following the merger of the Conservative and Unionist and the National Liberal parties in 1947, which won a combined 28 seats at the 1945 general election.)	2nd	Opposition
1951		Winston Churchill	1,349,298	48.6	35 / 72	▲4	▲1st	Majority
1955		Anthony Eden	1,273,942	50.1	36 / 72	▲1	1st	Majority
1959		Harold Macmillan	1,260,287	47.3	31 / 72	▼5	▼2nd	Majority
1964		Alec Douglas-Home	1,069,695	40.6	24 / 72	▼7	2nd	Opposition
1966		Edward Heath	960,675	37.7	20 / 72	▼4	2nd	Opposition
1970		Edward Heath	1,020,674	38.0	23 / 72	▲3	2nd	Majority
1974 Feb		Edward Heath	950,668	32.9	21 / 72	▼2	2nd	Opposition
1974 Oct		Edward Heath	681,327	24.7	16 / 72	▼5	2nd	Opposition
1979		Margaret Thatcher	916,155	31.4	22 / 72	▲6	2nd	Majority
1983		Margaret Thatcher	801,487	28.4	21 / 72	▼1	2nd	Majority
1987		Margaret Thatcher	713,081	24.0	10 / 72	▼11	2nd	Majority
1992		John Major	751,950	25.6	11 / 72	▲1	2nd	Majority
1997		John Major	493,059	17.5	0 / 72	▼11	▼4th	Opposition
2001	David McLetchie	William Hague	360,658	15.6	1 / 72	▲1	4th	Opposition
2005	David McLetchie	Michael Howard	369,388	15.8	1 / 59	Steady	4th	Opposition
2010	Annabel Goldie	David Cameron	412,855	16.7	1 / 59	Steady	4th	Con–LD
2015	Ruth Davidson	David Cameron	434,097	14.9	1 / 59	Steady	▲3rd	Majority
2017	Ruth Davidson	Theresa May	757,949	28.6	13 / 59	▲12	▲2nd	Minority (Note: The Democratic Unionist Party (DUP) provided confidence and supply for the Conservative Party government.)
2019	Jackson Carlaw	Boris Johnson	692,939	25.1	6 / 59	▼7	2nd	Majority
2024	Douglas Ross	Rishi Sunak	307,344	12.7	5 / 57	▼1	▼4th	Opposition

=== Scottish Parliament ===
Blue indicates seats won by the Conservatives in the 2026 Scottish Parliament election.

Election	Leader	Constituency			Regional			Total seats	+/–	Pos.	Government
Election	Leader	Votes	%	Seats	Votes	%	Seats	Total seats	+/–	Pos.	Government
1999	David McLetchie	364,425	15.6	0 / 73	359,109	15.3	18 / 56	18 / 129	Steady	3rd	Opposition
2003	David McLetchie	318,279	16.6	3 / 73	296,929	15.5	15 / 56	18 / 129	Steady	3rd	Opposition
2007	Annabel Goldie	334,743	16.6	4 / 73	284,035	13.9	13 / 56	17 / 129	▼1	3rd	Opposition
2011	Annabel Goldie	276,652	13.9	3 / 73	245,967	12.4	12 / 56	15 / 129	▼2	3rd	Opposition
2016	Ruth Davidson	501,844	22.0	7 / 73	524,222	22.9	24 / 56	31 / 129	▲16	▲2nd	Opposition
2021	Douglas Ross	592,526	21.9	5 / 73	637,131	23.5	26 / 56	31 / 129	Steady	2nd	Opposition
2026	Russell Findlay	271,740	11.8	4 / 73	271,550	11.8	8 / 56	12 / 129	▼19	▼5th	Opposition

=== Local councils ===
The Local Government (Scotland) Act 1973 established a two-tier system of regions and districts (except in the islands, which were given unitary, all-purpose councils). It replaced the counties, burghs, and districts established by the Local Government (Scotland) Act 1947, which were largely based on units of local government dating from the Middle Ages.

District councils					Regional and island councils				
Election	Votes		Seats	Councils	Election	Votes		Seats	Councils
Election	%	Pos.	Seats	Councils	Election	%	Pos.	Seats	Councils
1974	26.8	2nd	241 / 1,110	6 / 53	1974	28.6	2nd	112 / 432	1 / 12
1977	27.2	2nd	259 / 1,158	8 / 53	1978	30.3	2nd	136 / 431	2 / 12
1980	24.1	2nd	232 / 1,158	6 / 53	1982	25.1	2nd	119 / 524	2 / 12
1984	21.4	2nd	189 / 1,158	4 / 53	1986	16.9	▼3rd	65 / 524	0 / 12
1988	19.4	▼3rd	162 / 1,158	3 / 53	1990	19.2	3rd	52 / 524	0 / 12
1992	23.2	3rd	204 / 1,158	4 / 53	1994	13.7	3rd	31 / 453	0 / 12

2022 local election results in Scotland where blue represents the Scottish Conservatives.

The two-tier system of local government lasted until 1 April 1996 when the Local Government etc. (Scotland) Act 1994 came into effect, abolishing the regions and districts and replacing them with 32 unitary authorities. Elections for the new mainland unitary authorities were first contested in 1995. The Local Governance (Scotland) Act 2004 switched the electoral system for Scottish local elections from first past the post (FPTP) to single transferable vote (STV), beginning in 2007.

Election	Leader	1st Pref Votes		Councillors		Councils		Pos.
Election	Leader	Votes	%	Seats	±	Majorities	±	Pos.
1995 (Note: The three island regional councils (Orkney, Shetland and the Western Isles) were retained from the previous two-tier system of local government. These councils did not take part in the 1995 election, having held local elections in 1994.)		196,109	11.5	82 / 1,155	N/A	0 / 29	N/A	▼4th
1999		308,170	13.5	108 / 1,222	▲26	0 / 32	Steady	4th
2003		282,895	15.1	122 / 1,222	▲14	0 / 32	Steady	4th
2007		327,591	15.6	143 / 1,222	▲21	0 / 32	Steady	4th
2012	Ruth Davidson	206,599	13.3	115 / 1,222	▼28	0 / 32	Steady	▲3rd
2017	Ruth Davidson	478,073	25.3	276 / 1,227	▲161	0 / 32	Steady	▲2nd
2022	Douglas Ross	364,824	19.7	214 / 1,226	▼63	0 / 32	Steady	▼3rd

=== European Parliament ===
The Scottish Conservatives failed to win a plurality of the votes in any council area at the 2019 European Parliament election in Scotland.

During the United Kingdom's membership of the European Union (1973–2020), Scotland participated in European Parliament elections, held every five years from 1979 until 2019. Elections between 1979 and 1994 were contested under the first past the post (FPTP) electoral system. The European Parliamentary Elections Act 1999 introduced a closed-list party list system method of proportional representation and a single Scotland-wide electoral region, which came into effect in 1999.

Election	Leader		Scotland			
Election	(Scotland)	(United Kingdom)	%	Seats	+/–	Pos.
1979		Margaret Thatcher	33.7	5 / 8		1st
1984		Margaret Thatcher	25.8	2 / 8	▼3	▼2nd
1989		Margaret Thatcher	20.9	1 / 8	▼1	▼3rd
1994		John Major	14.5	0 / 8	▼1	3rd
1999		William Hague	19.8	2 / 8	▲2	3rd
2004		Michael Howard	17.8	2 / 7	Steady	3rd
2009		David Cameron	16.8	1 / 6	▼1	3rd
2014	Ruth Davidson	David Cameron	17.2	1 / 6	Steady	3rd
2019	Ruth Davidson	Theresa May	11.6	1 / 6	Steady	▼4th

== See also ==
- Scottish Unionist Party (1912–1965)
- Scottish Unionist Party (1986)
- Conservative Future Scotland
- Elections in Scotland
- Northern Ireland Conservatives
- Welsh Conservatives
