= Fulton (surname) =

Fulton is a surname. Notable people with the surname include:

== A ==
- Adam Kelso Fulton (1929-1994), Scottish rugby union internationalist
- Alexander Fulton (1805–1885), founder of the Iowa State Agricultural Society
- Alice Fulton (born 1952), poet, author
- Andrew Fulton (disambiguation), several people'
- Angus Fulton (1900–1983), British civil engineer
- Angus Robertson Fulton (1871–1958), Scottish engineer and academic
- Anne Fulton (1951–2015), Canadian activist
- Arnold Fulton (born 1931), British entrepreneur and inventor
- Arthur Fulton (sport shooter) (1887–1972), British sport shooter
- Arthur Fulton (engineer) (1853–1889), New Zealand engineer

== B ==
- Bill Fulton (disambiguation), several people
- Bob Fulton (1947–2021), Australian former rugby league footballer and coach
- Bobby Fulton (born 1960), former American professional wrestler
- Brenda Sue Fulton, American army officer and campaigner
- Brett Fulton, Australian former professional rugby league footballer
- Bruce Fulton, American professor and translator
- Bryce Fulton (1935–1976), Scottish footballer

== C ==
- Calvin L. Fulton (1840–1907), American surveyor and civil engineer
- Catherine Fulton (1829–1919), New Zealand diarist and social reformer
- Champian Fulton (born 1985), American jazz singer and pianist
- Charles Fulton (disambiguation), several people
- Charlie Fulton, American football player
- Charlie Fulton, American professional wrestler
- Cheryl Ann Fulton, American harpist
- Christina Fulton, American actress
- Craig Fulton (born 1974), South African hockey player

== D ==
- Dale Fulton, (born 1992), Scottish footballer
- David Fulton (disambiguation), several people
- Davie Fulton (1916–2000), Canadian politician
- Dax Fulton (born 2001), American baseball player

== E ==
- E. G. Fulton (1867–1949), Canadian-American businessperson and writer
- Ed Fulton (born 1938), former Canadian politician
- Eileen Fulton (born 1933), American actress
- Elmer L. Fulton (1865–1939), US Representative from Oklahoma

== F ==
- Fitzhugh L. Fulton (1925–2015), American research pilot
- Forrest Fulton (1846–1926), British judge and politician
- Francis Fulton-Smith (born 1966), German television actor
- Fred Fulton (1891–1973), American heavyweight boxer
- Frederick John Fulton (1862–1938), British-born Canadian lawyer

== G ==
- George Fulton (disambiguation), several people
- Gina Fulton (born 1971), British figure skater
- Grace Fulton (born 1996), American actress and dancer
- Grant Fulton (born 1973), South African hockey player
- Gregory Fulton, American computer game designer
- Guy Fulton (1892–1974), American architect

== H ==
- Hamilton Fulton (c. 1780 – 1834), British engineer
- Harry Fulton (1869–1918), British Army officer who served in the New Zealand Military Forces during WWI
- Henry Fulton (1761–1840), Irish-Australian clergyman
- Herbert Fulton (1872–1951), Indian-born English cricketer
- Holly Fulton (born 1977), British fashion designer

== I ==
- Ira A. Fulton (born 1931), American businessman and philanthropist

== J ==
- Jack Fulton (1903–1993), American composer and trombonist
- Jackie Fulton (born 1963), retired American professional wrestler
- James Fulton (disambiguation), several people
- Jay Fulton (born 1994), Scottish footballer
- John Fulton (disambiguation), several people
- Judge Fulton (1739–1826), Irish-born Canadian politician, surveyor and justice of the peace
- Julie Fulton (born 1959), American actress
- Julian Fulton, American songwriter and musician
- June Fulton (bowls), Botswanan lawn bowls player

== K ==
- Kenneth Fulton (born 1941), American choral conductor
- Kevin Fulton, British intelligence agent
- Kristian Fulton (born 1998), American football player

== L ==
- Laurie S. Fulton (born 1949), American attorney and diplomat
- Liam Fulton (born 1984), Australian rugby league footballer

== M ==
- Marcus Fulton (??-1892), Wisconsin politician
- Margaret Fulton (1924–2019), Australian journalist and writer
- Marjorie Fulton (1909–1962), American concert violinist and music educator
- Mark Fulton (born 1959), former Scottish footballer
- Mark Fulton (loyalist) (c. 1961 – 2002), Northern Irish loyalist
- Maude Fulton (1881–1950), American actress, playwright and stage director
- Maurice Garland Fulton (1878–1955), American historian

== N ==
- Nial Fulton, Irish-born Australian film and television producer

== O ==
- Oscar Fulton (1843–1907), Canadian merchant and politician
- Otho Fulton (1868–1938), American inventor

== P ==
- Peter Fulton (born 1979), New Zealand cricketer
- Pierce Fulton (1992–2021), American musician

== R ==
- Richard Fulton (1927–2018), American politician
- Rikki Fulton (1924–2004), Scottish television actor
- Robert Fulton (disambiguation), several people
- Robin Fulton (born 1937), Scottish poet
- Roddy Fulton (born 1951), New Zealand Cricket Director
- Ryan Fulton (born 1996), Scottish football player

== S ==
- Sandy Fulton (1942–2001), Northern Irish footballer
- Sarah Bradlee Fulton (1740–1835), American participant of the Revolutionary War
- Sawyer Fulton (born 1990), American professional wrestler
- Scott Fulton (born 1973), Australian former professional rugby league footballer
- Stephen Fulton (politician) (1810–1870), Canadian merchant shipbuilder and politician
- Steve Fulton (born 1970), former Scottish footballer
- Stokeley Fulton (1929–1985), American college sports coach

== T ==
- Thomas Fulton (1949–1994), American conductor
- Thomas Fulton (ironmaster) (1826–1898) Scottish and Australian iron founder
- Tony Fulton (disambiguation), several people
- Travis Fulton (1977–2021), American mixed martial arts fighter

== W ==
- Wendy Fulton (born 1954), former American television actress
- Weston Fulton (1871–1946), American meteorologist and inventor
- William Fulton (disambiguation), several people

== X ==
- Xavier Fulton (born 1986), American footballer

== Z ==
- Zach Fulton (born 1991), American footballer

== See also ==
- Fulton (disambiguation)
