= Charlie Fulton =

Charlie Fulton may refer to:

- Charlie Fulton (Canadian football) (born 1947), American player of Canadian football
- Charlie Fulton (wrestler) (1949–2016), American professional wrestler

== See also ==
- Charles Fulton (disambiguation)
