= Ruth Davidson =

Scottish politician (born 1978)

The Right Honourable The Baroness Davidson of Lundin Links PC
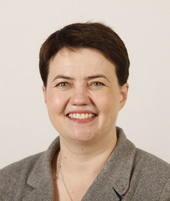
- Official portrait, 2016

Leader of the Scottish Conservative Party
- In office 4 November 2011 – 29 August 2019
- Deputy: Murdo Fraser; Jackson Carlaw
- UK party leader: David Cameron; Theresa May; Boris Johnson
- Preceded by: Annabel Goldie (Note: As Leader of the Scottish Conservative Party in the Scottish Parliament.)
- Succeeded by: Jackson Carlaw

Member of the House of Lords
- Lord Temporal
- Life peerage 16 July 2021
Scottish Parliament constituencies
Member of the Scottish Parliament for Edinburgh Central
In office 5 May 2016 – 5 May 2021
Preceded by	Marco Biagi
Succeeded by	Angus Robertson
Member of the Scottish Parliament for Glasgow
In office 5 May 2011 – 24 March 2016

Co-Chair of Prosper UK
- Incumbent
- Assumed office January 2026 Serving with Andy Street
- Vice chairs: Amber Rudd; David Gauke
- Preceded by: Position established

Personal details
- Born: Ruth Elizabeth Davidson; 10 November 1978 (age 47) Edinburgh, Scotland
- Party: Scottish Conservatives
- Domestic partner: Jen Wilson (2014–present)
- Children: 1
- Education: University of Edinburgh (MA); University of Glasgow (MSc)
- Occupation: Politician; journalist

Military service
- Allegiance: United Kingdom
- Branch/service: Territorial Army
- Years of service: 2003–2006
- Rank: Signaller
- Unit: 32 Signal Regiment

Ruth Elizabeth Davidson, Baroness Davidson of Lundin Links (born 10 November 1978), is a Scottish politician. A member of the House of Lords since 2021, she was Leader of the Scottish Conservative Party from 2011 to 2019 and Leader of the Scottish Conservative Party in the Scottish Parliament from 2020 to 2021. She served as a Member of the Scottish Parliament (MSP) for Glasgow from 2011 to 2016 and for Edinburgh Central from 2016 to 2021. Davidson is co-host of Sky News podcast Electoral Dysfunction alongside Beth Rigby and Baroness Harman.

Born in Edinburgh, Davidson was raised in Selkirk and later attended Buckhaven High School in Fife. After graduating from the University of Edinburgh, she worked as a BBC journalist and served in the Territorial Army as a signaller. After leaving the BBC in 2009 to study at the University of Glasgow, she joined the Conservative Party. At the 2011 Scottish Parliament election, Davidson was elected on the Glasgow regional list. Following party leader Annabel Goldie's resignation in May 2011, Davidson stood in the subsequent leadership election.

She won the contest and was declared party leader on 4 November 2011. In 2016, the Conservatives replaced the Labour Party as the second-largest party in the Scottish Parliament. Davidson resigned the leadership in August 2019, shortly after Boris Johnson became Prime Minister of the United Kingdom. She was succeeded by Jackson Carlaw who was replaced by Douglas Ross. After leading the party in Holyrood for several months, Davidson stood down at the 2021 Scottish Parliament election. In 2021, she was appointed a life peer in the House of Lords.

Davidson was generally considered a fairly successful leader, especially in 2016 and 2017. Ideologically, she is considered a centrist. She supported Scotland remaining part of the United Kingdom in the 2014 Scottish independence referendum. In the years after 2014, she continued to appeal to "No" voters in the referendum on that basis along with opposition to a second vote. She supported the UK remaining in the European Union in the 2016 EU membership referendum.

== Early life and career ==
Davidson was born at the Edinburgh Royal Maternity Hospital and Simpson Memorial Maternity Pavilion. She was raised in Selkirk and later in Lundin Links, Fife. Her family lived in Raeburn Place and then Bridgelands Road, Selkirk, and Davidson attended Knowepark Primary School until Primary 3. (Note: Primary 3 refers to third year of primary school in Scotland; for children aged six to eight years old.) Her father, Douglas, a mill manager at Laidlaw & Fairgrieve, had played professional football for Partick Thistle F.C. in his younger days and was a midfielder for Selkirk F.C. during the late-1970s and early-1980s. When her father took a job in the whisky industry, the family left the Borders for Fife, where she attended the state secondary Buckhaven High School. Her parents voted Conservative but were not especially involved in politics.

Davidson studied English literature at the University of Edinburgh, gaining an undergraduate Master of Arts (MA Hons) degree. After graduation, she joined the Glenrothes Gazette as a trainee reporter. She later moved to Kingdom FM, followed by Real Radio, and finally joined BBC Scotland in late 2002 where she worked as a radio journalist, producer, presenter and reporter. She left the BBC in 2009 to study International Development at the University of Glasgow. She also served as a signaller in the 32 Signal Regiment of the Territorial Army for three years (2003–06) before suffering a back injury in a training exercise at Sandhurst.

== Early political career ==
In 2009, after having left the BBC to study at the University of Glasgow, Davidson joined the Conservative Party. She said she was inspired by a call by David Cameron, the then Leader of the Opposition, in the wake of the United Kingdom parliamentary expenses scandal, for people who had never previously been political to get involved in politics. She was encouraged by the Scottish Conservative Party's Director of Media, Ramsay Jones, to join the party and stand for the House of Commons seat of Glasgow North East at the 2009 by-election, which was triggered by the resignation of Labour MP and Speaker of the House, Michael Martin. She finished in third place, with 1,075 votes (5.2% share of the vote).

From early 2010 to March 2011, she worked as the head of the private office of the then Scottish Conservative leader, Annabel Goldie. She played a large part in the organisation of campaign media events in the run-up to the 2010 general election, at which she ran again in Glasgow North East, finishing in fourth place with 1,569 votes (a 5.3% share of the vote).

=== Election to Scottish Parliament and first roles ===
For the 2011 Scottish Parliament election, Davidson contested the Glasgow Kelvin constituency and was initially placed second on the Conservatives' Glasgow region list, behind Malcolm Macaskill. A few months before the election it was reported in the press that Macaskill had failed to fully disclose his business career to party members ahead of a 2010 internal party selection contest. On 24 March, Andrew Fulton, the Chairman of the Scottish Conservatives, decided that Macaskill was to be deselected, thereby promoting Davidson to the first position in the Glasgow regional list. This led to protests from the supporters of Macaskill, and some major donors withdrew their financial support for the party. In the election, after coming a distant fourth in Glasgow Kelvin, Davidson was elected to the Scottish Parliament from the Glasgow region list. After the election she was appointed by Goldie as the Conservative spokesperson for Culture, Europe and External Relations.

== Leadership of the Scottish Conservative Party ==
=== Election bid ===
After a poor result for her party at the election, Annabel Goldie resigned as Scottish Conservative leader on 9 May 2011. Davidson became a contender in the subsequent leadership election. Her rivals later claimed that Davidson received assistance from Party headquarters, though her supporters stated that these claims were part of a smear campaign. She stood against three other candidates – Murdo Fraser, Jackson Carlaw and Margaret Mitchell. Fraser stood on a platform of separating the Scottish Conservatives from the UK-wide party and establishing a new Scottish centre-right party. Davidson announced her candidacy on 4 September and vehemently opposed Fraser's proposals to separate the party, calling it a "distraction" which would "tie the party in knots". Academic Alexander Smith described Davidson as ideologically aligned with the party's centrists while Fraser was associated with the party's right.

Davidson's campaign was endorsed by two MSPs and a former Secretary of State for Scotland, Lord Forsyth. She was also supported by David Mundell, the sole Conservative MP in Scotland. Despite being a List MSP for Glasgow, she failed to gain the endorsement of a single chairperson of any of the five Conservative Constituency Associations in Glasgow and over half the MSP group had supported Murdo Fraser.

On 11 September 2011, Davidson sacked her election agent and parliamentary assistant Ross McFarlane. He had been filmed trying to burn a European Union flag in a Glasgow street following a University Conservative Association (GUCA) St Andrew's Day dinner in November 2010. On 5 October 2011, the Scottish Conservative media director Ramsay Jones was suspended from his duties during the leadership contest, after it was revealed that he had met Davidson and her campaign team in her flat on Sunday, 18 September.

Davidson subsequently won the leadership election and was made the leader of the Scottish Conservatives on 4 November 2011. She gained 2,278 first preference votes out of the 5,676 votes cast, after second preference votes were counted, she won by 2,983 votes to runner up Murdo Fraser's 2,417. This sparked some discontent within the party, with prominent party supporter Paul McBride resigning from the party and party donor John McGlynn criticised her election, saying that she was elected through "interference".

=== Early leadership ===
At Davidson's first Scottish Conservative conference leadership speech, she announced the introduction of a new Logo for the Scottish Conservatives featuring an eight-pronged cross arguing that it was "distinctly Scottish but with colours which clearly reflect our pride in the United Kingdom". At her first electoral test at the 2012 local elections the Scottish Conservatives lost seats, leading to some worry and talk of a leadership coup in party circles. According to a profile by Ian Leslie in the New Statesman, the early part of Davidson's leadership was difficult. She made what he called a "prolonged and embarrassing climb-down" from a pledge to oppose any further devolution of powers to the Scottish parliament and struggled in parliamentary debates with Alex Salmond. Although, he also writes that she began to get attention through social media and reformed the party's processes of selecting candidates for the Scottish Parliament. David Torrance wrote that after a year in office Davidson "had little to show in terms of policy development, strategic direction or opinion polls". Telegraph columnist Alan Cochrane was deeply critical writing in his diary at the time that:

She [Davidson] is totally and utterly useless and so are her team. They haven’t a bloody clue but she is the problem – big problem. Not up to the job, as Attlee would say, and I suspect that some hacks (Note: The term 'hack' doesn't have the same negative connotations in the UK as elsewhere.) will start asking questions. [David] Mundell said he knew she wasn’t cutting the mustard . . . But he claims they’ve got someone lined up to help her. Christ, they need it. They’re all just bairns [children] in her office and I suspect the Tory MSPs ain’t helping her.

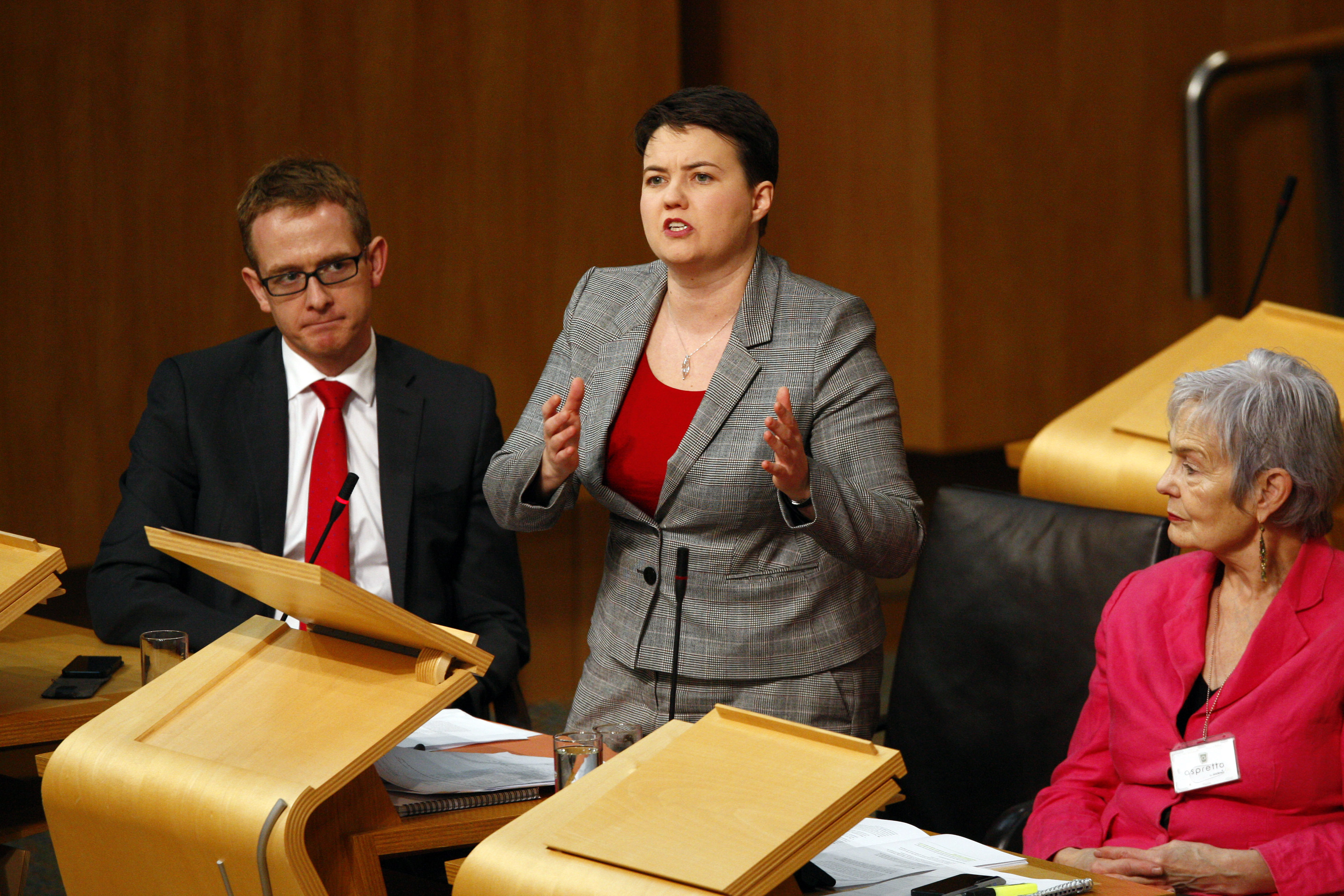
Davidson as secondary opposition leader at a Scottish Parliament FMQs, 2014

Davidson began to "modernise" the party's stance in the mould of changes Cameron was also making at the time. Expressing support for greater devolution and same-sex marriage. As time passed, a few positive signs began to appear for Davidson's electoral prospects. The upcoming referendum attracted more support in the sense of activists and financial assistance to the party. Cameron’s Caledonian Conundrum, a 2013 report by Michael Ashcroft into the Conservatives electoral prospects in Scotland, identified a substantial number of voters outside their base of support that were attracted by aspects of the Conservative brand such as seeing Cameron as the best candidate for prime minister or agreeing with the Conservative argument on the economy. These potential swing voters had "a generally positive view" of Davidson remembering things about her, such as an incident when she had been asked for ID to drink alcohol at an event. John Curtice noted a small increase in the party's support in Scotland between 2012 and 2014. In the 2014 European Election, the Conservatives modestly increased their vote share in Scotland while losing support elsewhere.

=== 2014 Scottish independence referendum and aftermath ===
She campaigned for a 'No' vote in 2014, expressing the view that Scottish independence would endanger the "wonderful messiness of these islands". Reflecting on the referendum some years later she said, "I think I did cry but I don’t think until a couple of days after. It was a bit delayed, but it was pure relief." Ian Leslie argues that the referendum gave Davidson an opportunity to become a major figure in Scottish politics. He wrote that she was an effective campaigner able to make a compelling case even for aspects of UK policy which were not popular in Scotland, such as Trident. David Patrick argues that while the referendum helped Davidson to gain more media coverage she was not one of the main figures in the debate.

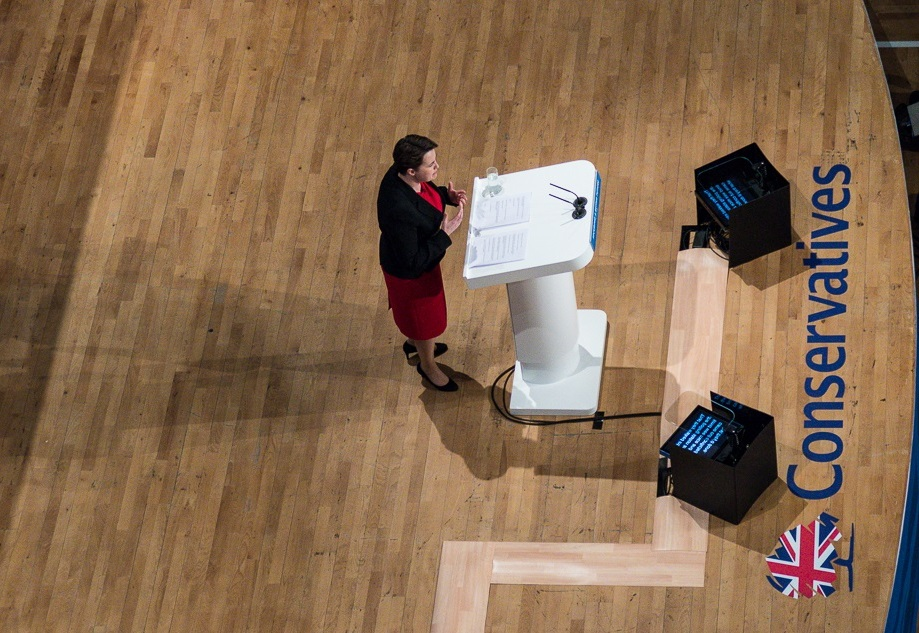
Davidson speaking at the 2014 Conservative Party conference

When Alex Salmond resigned as First Minister of Scotland, Davidson nominated herself to succeed him. She knew that the SNP's majority virtually assured that Salmond's successor as SNP leader, Nicola Sturgeon, would become First Minister. Nevertheless, she felt the need to offer "an alternative vision of Scotland". Davidson received 15 votes to Sturgeon's 66. David Torrance argues that she began a strategy of attempting to appeal to "No" voters on the basis of their vote. Davidson called Sturgeon a referendum "denier" and implied that she wanted another vote in the near future. The Scottish Conservatives had no improvement in their poll ratings in the six months after the referendum and at the 2015 general election the Conservatives vote share fell by a small amount in Scotland.

Following the referendum, a year-long police investigation took place into allegations that pro-Union campaigners, including Davidson, had breached secrecy provisions of the Scottish Independence Referendum Act 2013. In September 2015, detectives reported their findings to the Crown Office and Procurator Fiscal Service. Police Scotland stated, in reference to the report, that no evidence of criminality was found, and consequently there was no charge to answer.

=== 2016 EU referendum and aftermath ===
Before the United Kingdom European Union membership referendum held on 23 June 2016, she campaigned against British withdrawal from the European Union. On 21 June 2016, she participated in the BBC's Wembley Arena Debate, as a panellist for the "Remain" campaign with Frances O'Grady and Mayor of London, Sadiq Khan. Their opponents were former Mayor of London and Conservative MP Boris Johnson, Labour MP Gisela Stuart and Conservative MP Andrea Leadsom, who argued on behalf of the "Leave" campaign as part of a cross-party debate. She was critical of other Conservatives supporting Leave. Ian Leslie argues that "Davidson achieved something that nobody else did: she made the case for Remain sound thrillingly righteous" and that her performance led to observers outside of Scotland seeing her as a major figure in British politics. Commentator Martin Kettle wrote that David Cameron was making plans to move Davidson to the UK Parliament if he had won the referendum in order to position her as his successor.

The referendum saw 52% of British voters decide to leave the European Union, while 62% of the Scottish electorate who cast their vote backed remaining in the EU. Years later Davidson reflected: "Turns out we were 4% not good enough – but for such things the world turns – and I'll never quite forgive myself for not getting that 4%." Following the announcement of the result, First Minister Nicola Sturgeon suggested the constitutional change it would bring about justified the need for a second referendum on Scottish independence, but Davidson said this would not be the answer to concerns raised by the prospect of leaving the European Union: "The 1.6 million votes cast in this referendum in favour of Remain do not wipe away the two million votes that were cast less than two years ago". She also called on the UK and Scottish Governments to work together and put "stability" first.

In the Conservative leadership contest triggered by the resignation of Prime Minister David Cameron, Davidson gave her backing to Home Secretary Theresa May to succeed him as Conservative Party leader and Prime Minister, describing May as a "proper grown up [who is] best placed to navigate the stormy waters ahead". Davidson was appointed to the Privy Council on 13 July 2016. At the 2016 Conservative Party Conference, Davidson warned her party that "immigrants should be made to feel welcome in the UK" and the "party should not lurch to the right in the wake of Labour's implosion". She argued that Britain should seek access to the European Single Market even if that meant accepting reciprocal freedom of movement.

=== Electoral gains in 2016 and 2017 ===
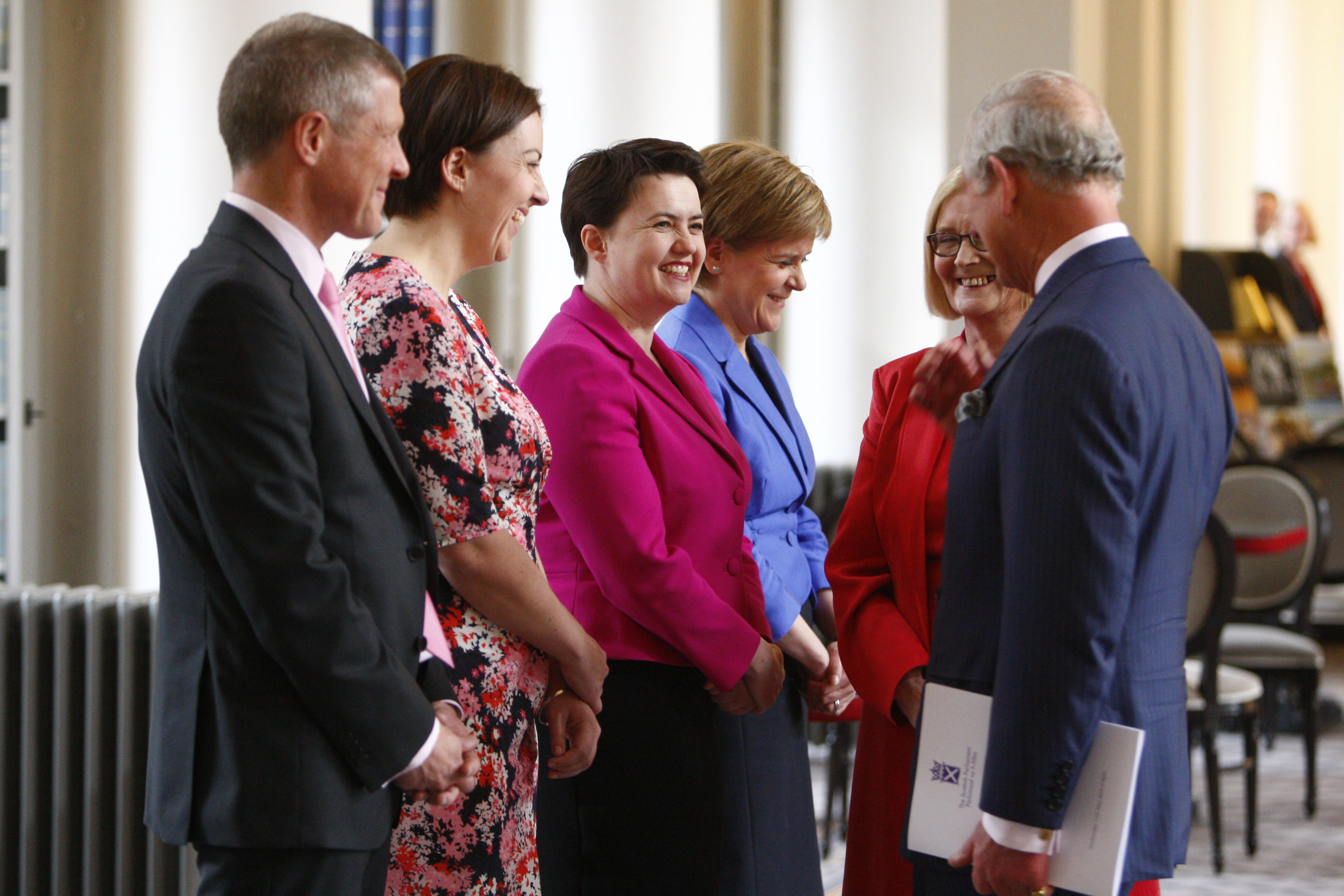
Davidson meets Prince Charles, 2016

In 2016 and 2017, Davidson had high approval ratings in Scotland with many voters seeing her as an unusual kind of Conservative. Political commentator Stephen Bush argued that the aftermath of the Scottish independence referendum gave Davidson an opportunity to position herself and her party as the "loudest defender of the Union". This, he wrote, was a position with significant appeal among a section of "No" supporting Labour and Liberal Democrat voters at a time when Scottish Labour were focused on minimising their losses of 'Yes' supporters to the SNP. Bush was of the view that this contributed to Conservative electoral gains in Scotland over the next few years.

Davidson led the Scottish Conservatives into the 2016 Scottish Parliament election, where the party doubled its number of Scottish Parliament seats to 31, replacing Labour as the second largest party at Holyrood behind the Scottish National Party. The election also saw Davidson, who had previously been a list MSP, win the constituency of Edinburgh Central from the SNP with 10,399 votes. Reacting to the result Davidson said, "I am under no illusion that everybody who voted for me in that seat is a true-blue, dyed-in-the wool Tory, and neither are they in places up and down Scotland. They are people who want us to do a very specific job, and that it is to hold the SNP to account." Following the success of the Scottish Conservatives at the 2016 Scottish election, in which the party doubled its number of MSPs, a Guardian article noted that "some in Westminster see her as a potential future leader, who could broaden the party's appeal and help tackle perceptions it is on the side of the privileged". However, Davidson dismissed the suggestion in an interview with The House magazine, describing the role of Prime Minister as "the loneliest job in the world". But she did not rule out the prospect of becoming an MP, saying she would only do so "for now".

At the 2017 local elections, the Scottish Conservatives achieved their best results since devolution, gaining 164 seats including some surprise successes in working-class neighbourhoods such as Calton in Glasgow's East End and Ferguslie Park in Paisley (the UK's most deprived ward). The 2017 general election saw the Conservatives win 13 seats in Scotland, its best result since 1983. In an election which was not seen as going as well for the Conservatives elsewhere commentators linked their successes in Scotland to Ruth Davidson personally. The British General Election of 2017 notes that 'Had the [Conservative] party increased its vote share [in Scotland] only by the same amount as it did in England and Wales, it would have had just two Scottish seats rather than 13.' Though, while Davidson was popular and fought a distinct campaign from May she wasn't the only factor influencing the result. She said of the result "Indyref2 is dead... it's time to get back to what matters to the people of Scotland – that's sorting out our schools, growing our economy and looking at our public services."

=== Later leadership and resignation ===
In early 2018 there was some evidence from polling that support for the Scottish Conservatives was falling. That year she ruled out running in a future leadership election, saying she valued her mental health "too much". She also made comments on the Brexit process, advocating British withdrawal from the Common Fisheries Policy and opposing a hard border in the Irish Sea. She was criticised by her opponents for opposing the introduction of Primary school testing in Scotland when it had been included in the Scottish Conservatives' 2016 manifesto. Davidson spent much of late 2018 and early 2019 on maternity leave, during which she was largely quiet on politics.

David Torrance argues that the last few months of her leadership were difficult for Davidson. At the 2019 European election, the Conservatives gained 12% of the vote in Scotland; higher than elsewhere, but a decrease on 2014. In the 2019 Conservative leadership election, Davidson supported Boris Johnson's opponents but said she would "work with" him. In July 2019, Boris Johnson became prime minister. A figure Davidson had criticised and mocked in previous years. She opposed a no-deal Brexit, in opposition to Johnson's position at the time. Davidson was questioned on the idea of the Scottish Conservatives splitting into a separate party but said that a "German CDU–CSU model" was not something she supported. Though Torrance also expressed the view that the Scottish Conservatives experienced an improvement in their fortunes when the Shadow Chancellor of the Exchequer John McDonnell said Labour would not block a second Scottish independence referendum.

On 29 August 2019, Davidson stood down, citing several political and personal reasons for her decision to resign as leader. Davidson, whose son had been born a little less than a year earlier, said that she did not want to be separated from her family by an election campaign. She also said that she felt conflicted about the Brexit process.

== Later career ==
=== Return to backbenches and acting leadership ===
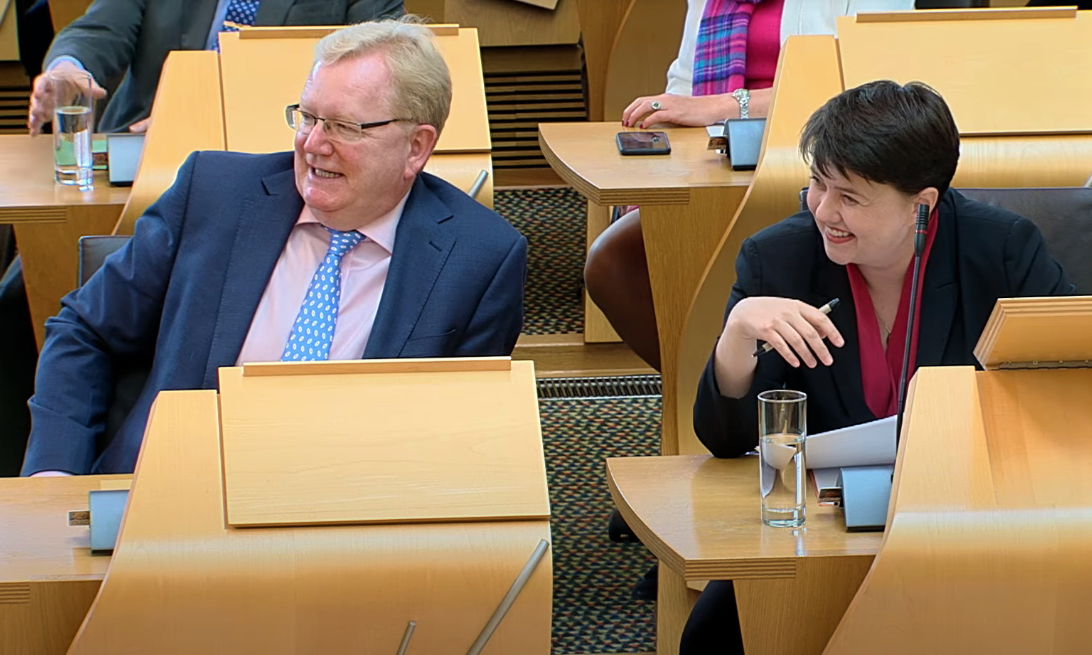
Jackson Carlaw (left) and Davidson (right) on the Scottish Conservative frontbench in 2018

After her resignation, Davidson criticised Boris Johnson for suspending 21 Conservative MPs in September 2019 and said he was doing so to make sure that the moderates in his cabinet were replaced by "more compliant Conservatives". She also praised Amber Rudd's decision to leave the cabinet over the "act of political vandalism".

In October 2019, Davidson accepted a public relations role for lobbying firm Tulchan Communications while retaining her job as an MSP. Her employment drew into question potential conflicts of interest and the size of her salary, £50,000 for 25 days' work, in addition to her £63,000-a-year MSP's salary. A week later, she changed her mind after meeting with parliamentary officials, although she insisted no conflict would have emerged had she still taken up the role. She implied in a December 2019 interview that she might want to become UK Conservative leader in years to come, when her son was older. Prior to the 2019 general election Davidson said that she would swim naked in Loch Ness if the Scottish National Party won 50 seats, but avoided the ordeal as the SNP won only 48.

In July 2020, when support for Scottish Independence and the SNP was at a high in the polls, Davidson's successor Jackson Carlaw resigned. Davidson then lobbied for the leadership bid of Douglas Ross. Later that month, it was announced she would be given a life peerage. She agreed to serve as Leader of the Conservative Party in the Scottish Parliament until the 2021 Scottish Parliament election, while Ross was yet to be elected to the Scottish Parliament. Ross was announced as leader five days later after running unopposed. In the 2021 Scottish Parliament election, Davidson featured heavily on her party's campaign literature, reportedly because she remained popular with "floating unionist voters".

=== House of Lords ===
In July 2021, Davidson entered the House of Lords as Baroness Davidson of Lundin Links, of Lundin Links in the County of Fife. She made her maiden speech on 22 October 2021 when she supported Baroness Meacher's Assisted Dying Bill. In other statements, she has criticised reductions of troop numbers in the British Army and a UK government scheme to deport asylum seekers to Rwanda. She claimed £24,521 in expenses (Note: Members of the House of the Lords do not receive a wage but can claim expenses.) and made six contributions to debates in her first year as a member.

Davidson presented Football's Gambling Addiction, a Channel 4 documentary released in June 2021 about the relationship between football and the gambling industry. In January 2022, it was announced that she would be presenting a weekly programme on Times Radio. She said that she was "very excited about combining my two great loves: politics and live broadcasting". In July 2023, she was appointed a non-executive director on the board of the Scottish Rugby Union.

In July 2024, Davidson, alongside the Labour mayor of Greater Manchester, Andy Burnham, was a panelist for the Sky News coverage of the general election which Labour won. She has also appeared regularly on Beth Rigby's podcast Electoral Dysfunction, alongside Jess Phillips and Harriet Harman. In January 2026, Davidson alongside Andy Street, David Gauke and Amber Rudd launched a movement called Prosper UK, aiming to bring the Conservative party back to the centre right.

== Public image ==
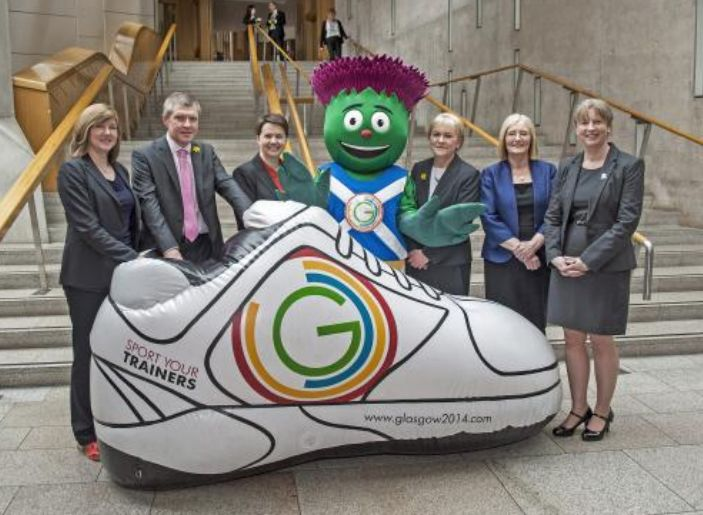
Ruth Davidson at a promotional event for the 2014 Commonwealth Games (third left)

Ruth Davidson was often described in reporting as an unusual type of Conservative. Her lower-middle class upbringing was frequently referenced in media coverage as an outlier in a party whose politicians were often perceived to be from privileged backgrounds. Davidson had previous experience dealing with the media from her broadcasting career and various election campaigns allowed her to improve her skills. David Patrick argued that Davidson was effective in using photo opportunities, magazine profiles and less serious sections of the news media (Note: For instance, appearing on topical panel show Have I Got News For You) to cultivate her image. He also suggested her unionist message aligned with the views of most Scottish papers, which contributed to her receiving a positive response in the press. As the years passed, especially between 2014 and 2017, Davidson's public profile grew in both Scotland and the rest of the UK. Various commentators argued that Ruth Davidson's appeal had roots in the fact that she was a clearly Scottish figure arguing against Scottish independence, something a majority had voted against in the 2014 referendum. There were some reports that ordinary voters saw her as overtly Scottish and distinct from the UK Conservative party. David Patrick argued there was also an element of British nationalism in her choice of language and imagery. For instance, in 2015, she was photographed waving a British flag while riding a tank.

When she became leader of the Scottish Conservatives, Davidson was the first openly homosexual leader of a UK political party. Davidson later wrote that she had received messages from gay young people who appreciated seeing someone of their sexuality in a role of political leadership. David Patrick wrote that she was "in many ways defined by her sexuality in her early years as leader, particularly in the period before she became so closely associated with opposition to another independence referendum", noting that her sexuality received interest from early on in the gay press. Jennifer Thomson and David Torrance argued in contrast that initially her sexuality played little role in her public profile, in part due to a separation she experienced in 2012 and as she was at the time a fairly fringe figure. Jennifer Thomson argued that as a series of electoral events in the middle of the 2010s increased Davidson's profile more attention was given to her sexuality. As time passed, Davidson began to discuss her sexuality in personal terms and appeared in a 2015 election broadcast with her partner. Ian Leslie wrote in 2016 that Davidson was 'forever tagged as a "kick-boxing lesbian" in the British press.'

== Policies and views ==
Various commentators have described Davidson and where she positioned the Scottish Conservatives as centrist, liberal or the 'centre ground'. Following Jeremy Corbyn's second internal leadership victory in 2016, she wrote an opinion piece for the Times promising to build a "moderate Scottish Conservative party that appeals to the same people who supported Brown and Blair". A 2014 Financial Times report called Davidson an "enthusiastic advocate of small government". A 2018 profile in Vogue stated that '[Davidson] describes herself as a "John Major" or "small-C" conservative with a strong social conscience and a belief in helping people to help themselves.'

Ian Leslie wrote in a 2016 profile of Davidson that her ideals are "profoundly conservative" arguing that she is a "British patriot, a churchgoer, a passionate supporter of the armed forces, an advocate for marriage, a believer in self-reliance". Although Leslie also stated that she is someone who entered politics as a career rather than out of ideological conviction. He notes that she only became formally involved in adulthood (Note: He contrasts this with senior figures in the SNP at the time who he says mostly joined their party prior to the age of eighteen.) and struggled to name politicians she regarded as role models outside of fictional literature. He continued that:

This lack of political nerdery is part of what makes her able to connect so directly with voters, but it is also a limitation. A consistent criticism of Davidson, even among those who admire her, is that she is not interested in policy, or at least that she does not have a set of distinctive policy ideas. This isn’t quite fair - she has published a paper on education and successfully focused attention on the attainment gap between poor and middle-class students. But she has not yet committed to a detailed alternative (a school vouchers (Note: Giving parents the option to send their children to private school with the state covering fees.) policy was raised and then quietly dropped). Other than "maintain the Union", it is difficult to know what a Davidson-led government would do.

=== Devolution ===
In her leadership campaign, Davidson initially promised to draw a "line in the sand" and oppose any further devolution to Scotland. In 2013, she said that the Scottish Conservatives were committed to "more responsibility for the Scottish Parliament and a strengthening of devolution" and set up the Strathclyde Commission to decide the party's policy on the subject. She also said that Conservatives had been wrong in their former opposition to the creation of the Scottish Parliament. In June 2014, she endorsed greater devolution arguing that it was reflective of public opinion, that the Scottish parliament being more accountable for what it spent was in line with conservative principles and that it would make it easier for her party to make an appeal based on tax cutting at Scottish Parliament elections. She argued in 2017 that more devolution of powers within Scotland to local government could help promote economic growth. In 2018, Ruth Davidson said in an interview that she would support a legal challenge in the Supreme Court on the basis of the Scottish Parliament voting to protect what it argued were its existing powers over Brexit. (Note: See UK Withdrawal from the European Union (Legal Continuity) (Scotland) Bill 2018) She asserted that the importance of legal action was to test the complex situation in the court.

=== Foreign affairs ===
In 2018, she criticised the behaviour of the charity workers in question following revelations that some employers of Oxfam in Haiti had been using prostitutes. She praised the assistance provided by foreign aid in general citing the examples of child immunisation programmes, landmine clearance and female education. In 2020, she criticised Chancellor of the Exchequer, Rishi Sunak's decision to decrease the amount the UK promised to spend on foreign aid from 0.7% to 0.5% of national income.

After King Abdullah of Saudi Arabia died in January 2015, the UK government decided to hang British flags at half-mast as a sign of mourning. In response, Davidson tweeted: "Flying flags at half-mast on government buildings for the death of a Saudi king is a steaming pile of nonsense. That is all." This tweet was in the context of recent outrage caused by the Kingdom of Saudi Arabia publicly beheading a woman and sentencing a blogger to 1,000 lashes. Following the Taliban's reconquest of Afghanistan in 2021, Davidson wrote an opinion piece with former Liberal Democrat leader Menzies Campbell advocating the UK give foreign aid to HALO, a British charity they are both associated with, which helps to clear landmines in Afghanistan.

=== Public services ===
In her leadership campaign, Davidson expressed support for state-funded Roman Catholic schooling in Scotland, and a belief that the Church of Scotland should open its own faith schools as well. In 2017, she argued in a speech to the Scottish Conservative conference that the education system in Scotland was not functioning effectively. She criticised the Curriculum for Excellence arguing that it had made "a generation of teachers, parents and pupils utterly confused about what is going on". In a speech in the same context in 2019 she argued that young people should be required to remain in some form of education or training up until the age of 18.

In 2011, she expressed support for judges being given the ability to effectively sentence perpetrators of "the most heinous, cruel and vile" crimes with a life sentence, with the intent that they are never released. In 2018, she wrote an opinion piece arguing that early release was being used too often in the Scottish justice system and that the victims of crimes should be allowed to attend parole board hearings.

In 2018, she wrote an opinion piece expressing support for the NHS saying that it had saved her life following a childhood accident. She criticised the fact that the Scottish NHS had not had its funding increased by as much as its English counterpart since 2010.

=== Social issues ===
A 2019 BBC News profile commented that "In the past, Ms Davidson has referred to LGBTI rights as one thing she cares about more than her party." Davidson supported same-sex marriage in a debate on legalising the practise in Scotland stating that "Presiding Officer, from childhood, you have known without even thinking that if you found someone you loved and who loved you in return, you would have the right to marry them... I want that right to extend to not just me but the thousands of people across Scotland who are told that the law says no and that they cannot marry the love of their life." She urged the Republic of Ireland to vote "Yes" in the 2015 constitutional vote to enable same-sex marriage.

At a campaign event for the 2022 local elections, she criticised what she saw as incendiary language in the debate around trans rights saying that "gotcha questions about who is a woman, who is a man, I'm not sure that helps". She expressed the view that the rights of women and trans people "do not have to be in conflict" elaborating that "let’s see how we can make things better and easier for people in the trans community who, as a minority, are vulnerable, are more open to attack, are more likely to be victims of crime, but while also seeking reassurances for rights for women that have been hard won over decades."

Davidson supports legalising assisted dying. She voted against legalising the practice in Scotland in 2015, a decision which she said several years later was motivated by "cowardice". She said that a change in her views had been motivated by seeing the suffering caused to relatives by dementia and by having some of her religious beliefs around the "creation of life" challenged by her use of IVF.

== Personal life ==
On 18 February 2015, Davidson appeared in a party election broadcast in which she was seen with her same-sex partner Jen Wilson, a 33-year-old Irish woman from County Wexford. Davidson announced her engagement to Wilson in May 2016, after proposing to her on holiday in Paris. On 26 April 2018 Davidson announced that she had become pregnant after receiving IVF treatment, and that she and Wilson were "excited" to be expecting their first child. On 26 October, Davidson gave birth to a boy at Edinburgh Royal Infirmary. She lives in North Berwick, East Lothian.

In a 2015 interview with BBC Radio Scotland, Davidson spoke about struggling with her sexuality: "I struggled with it for a number of years actually before I would admit it to myself, never mind to anybody else. But there comes a point at which you make a decision and that decision is either that you're going to live a lie for the rest of your life, or you're going to trust yourself, and that's what I had to do." In her memoirs, published in 2018 and serialised by The Sunday Times Magazine, Davidson writes of struggling with mental health issues as a teenager, something that she says was triggered by the suicide of a boy in her village. She has said that these struggles almost dissuaded her from running for leadership.

Davidson is a member of the Church of Scotland and counts dog walking, hillwalking and kickboxing as her hobbies. She supports Scottish football team Dunfermline Athletic. On 23 October 2015, Davidson became the first female Scottish politician to appear as a panellist on the BBC One satirical news quiz Have I Got News for You. Between 2017 and 2025, Davidson served as the Honorary Colonel of 32nd Signal Regiment. Davidson was included in Time magazine's 100 Most Influential People of 2018.

== Notes ==
Party political offices
Preceded by Annabel Goldie	Leader of the Scottish Conservative Party; 2011–2019	Succeeded by Jackson Carlaw
Scottish Parliament
Preceded by Marco Biagi	Member of the Scottish Parliament for Edinburgh Central; 2016–2021	Succeeded by Angus Robertson
