= John Fulton =

John or Jack Fulton may refer to:

- John P. Fulton (1902–1965), American special effects supervisor and cinematographer
- John Fulton (bullfighter) (1932–1998), American bullfighter
- John Fulton (cricketer, born 1849) (1849–1908), New Zealand cricketer
- Dave Fulton (John David Fulton, born 1965), New Zealand cricketer
- John Fulton (footballer) (1890–1926), Scottish footballer
- John Fulton (instrument maker) (1803–1853), Scottish maker of orreries
- John Fulton (writer) (born 1967), American author
- John H. Fulton (1792–1836), United States congressman from Virginia
- John Farquhar Fulton (1899–1960), American neurophysiologist and historian of science
- John Fulton (priest) (1834–1907), Episcopal priest with The Living Church, writer, lecturer, journalist
- John Fulton, Baron Fulton (1902–1986), British university administrator and public servant
- John Hamilton Fulton (1869–1927), president of National Park Bank
- John Russell Fulton (1896–1979), painter-illustrator
- John Fulton, American TV host and cat behaviorist, best known for the TV series Must Love Cats and Cats 101
- John Fulton (runner) (born 1922), winner of the 800 m at the 1946 USA Outdoor Track and Field Championships
- Jackie Fulton (born 1963), wrestler
- Jack Fulton, founder of frozen food retailer Fulton's Foods
- Jack Fulton (1903–1993), singer, trombone player and composer
- John Fulton (rugby union), Irish international rugby union player

== See also ==
- John Fulton Reynolds (1820–1863), American Civil War commander
