= 2011 Scottish Conservatives leadership election =

Leadership elections for Scottish Conservative party leader

- 4 November 2011
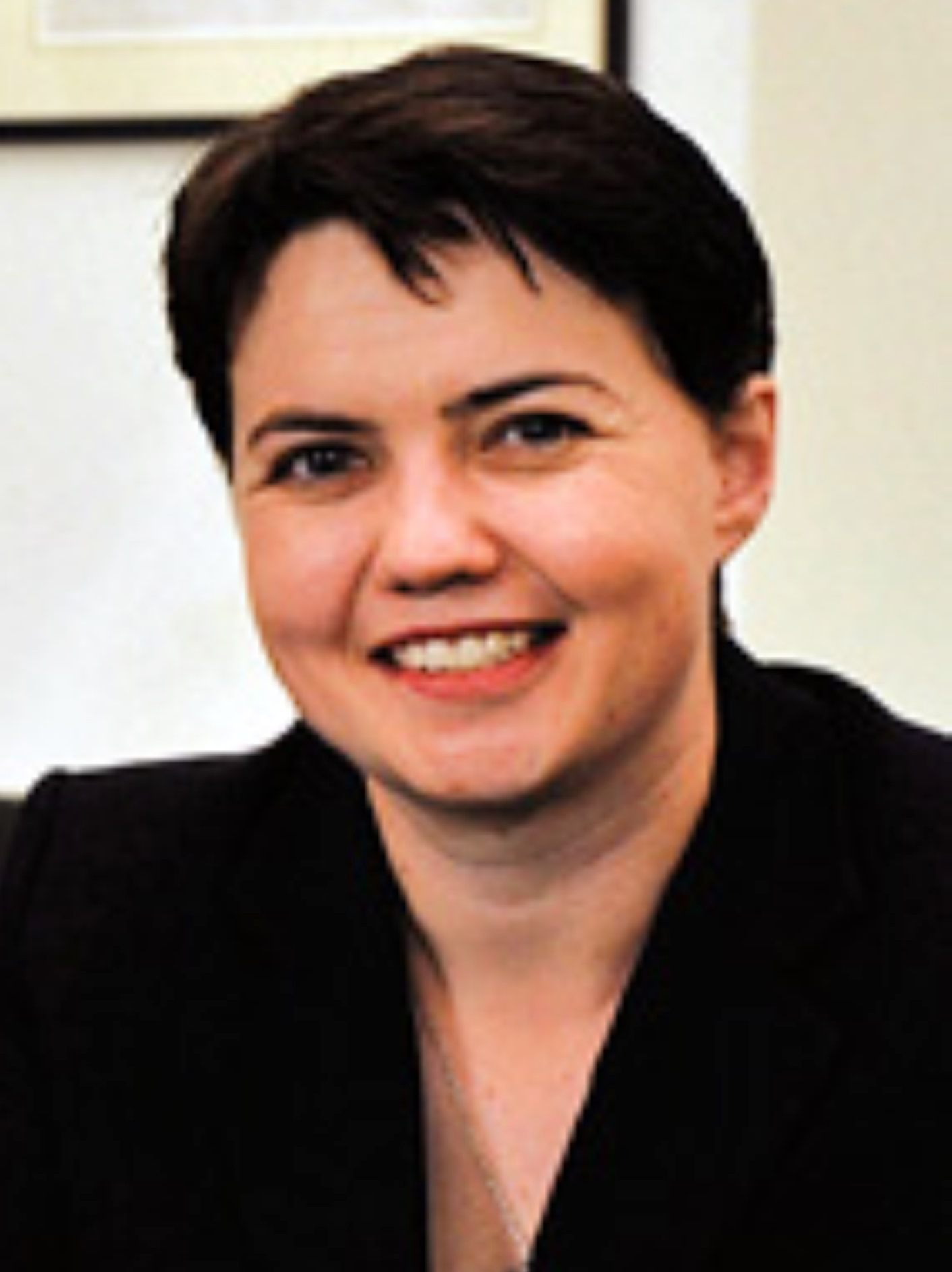

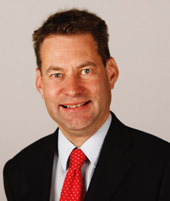

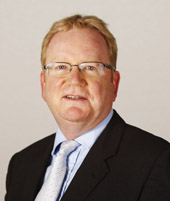

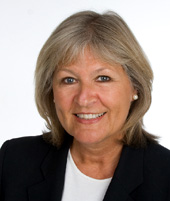
Candidate	Ruth Davidson	Murdo Fraser
1st Pref.	2,278	2,096
Percentage	40.3%	36.9%
Final Pref.	2,983	2,417
Percentage	55.2%	44.8%
Candidate	Jackson Carlaw	Margaret Mitchell
1st Pref.	830	472
Percentage	14.6%	8.3%
Final Pref.	Eliminated	Eliminated
Percentage	Eliminated	Eliminated
Leader before election
Annabel Goldie
Elected Leader
Ruth Davidson

The 2011 Scottish Conservatives leadership election was an internal party election to choose a new leader of the Scottish Conservatives, who at the time were the third-largest political party in the devolved Scottish Parliament. Ruth Davidson was declared the winner of the contest on 4 November 2011 and succeeded Annabel Goldie. The election was triggered when incumbent party leader Annabel Goldie resigned her position on 9 May 2011, following her party's self-described 'disappointing' result in the 2011 Scottish Parliament election, where the Conservatives were reduced from 17 seats to 15.

However, a commission headed by Lord Sanderson in 2010 had outlined the need for a leadership election directly after the 2011 elections, and had been critical of the party's then-current leadership and conduct. Four candidates stood in the contest, all of whom were MSPs: Ruth Davidson, Murdo Fraser, Jackson Carlaw and Margaret Mitchell. The contest sparked intense debate within the party, with Fraser standing on a platform of disbanding the Scottish Conservatives in favour of establishing a wholly new, centre-right Scottish party, which would be autonomous but allied to the Conservative Party in England and Wales. His idea was rejected by his three opponents; however, it had support from over half of the MSP group. After a ballot using the single transferable vote method, Davidson defeated Fraser by a margin of 566 votes.

== Background ==
=== The Sanderson Commission ===
Following the 2010 general election, David Cameron's Conservatives were the largest party and subsequently formed a government through a coalition with the Liberal Democrats. In Scotland, however, the party had gained no seats, and David Mundell remained the party's only Scottish MP. A committee then was established to analyse the situation, headed by Lord Sanderson, with Lord Forsyth also contributing.

The Sanderson Commission outlined these recommendations:

- Elect a Scottish leader to have overall responsibility for the Party's performance in Scotland.
- Replace the weak leadership and governance framework with a streamlined, transparent and accountable structure.
- Create regional campaign centres staffed by campaign professionals.
- Increase support and resources for the local association network.
- Develop a clear vision for Scotland, one distinct from that of the Scottish Conservatives.
- Engage the entire party and wider Scotland in policy development - and recruit a chief policy adviser.
- Introduce balloted motions and open debate at party conferences.
- Overhaul candidate selection and development - and reform the then-current ranking process for regional list MSPs.
- Establish a process to identify and develop future party leaders.
- Contest every local government seat throughout Scotland.
- Launch a new fundraising and membership drive across Scotland.
- Provide an annual grant to Conservative Future Scotland to help develop the party's youth wing.

The commission also stated the need to hold a leadership election after the Scottish parliamentary election, as no leadership election by that point had been held by the Scottish Conservatives. Both David McLetchie and Annabel Goldie were selected as leaders with no ballot taking place.

=== 2011 Scottish Parliament election ===
For the 2011 Scottish Parliament election, the party campaigned on what it called 'common sense for Scotland' and outlined the requirement to re-introduce university tuition fees and prescription charges, and emphasized what the party had helped pass through parliament as a minority force in the period from 2007 to 2011: 1,000 extra police officers, a four-year council tax freeze and a £60m town regeneration fund.

In the election, the Scottish National Party (SNP) under Alex Salmond won an unprecedented majority of seats, gaining 69 of the 129 available. The Conservative result was self-described as 'disappointing', as the party was reduced from 17 seats to 15. The party lost three of its six notionally-held constituency seats, including former party leader David McLetchie in Edinburgh Pentlands and Jackson Carlaw in Eastwood, although both individuals later returned to parliament on the regional list. Whilst the Conservatives could take comfort knowing that their losses were slight compared to those suffered by Labour and the Liberal Democrats, Annabel Goldie announced her resignation as party leader four days after the election.

== Candidates ==
Four MSPs stood in the contest.

Candidate	Constituency	Announced	Campaign logo	Supporters
Jackson Carlaw	West Scotland	26 August 2011		Mary Scanlon MSP; Paul McBride QC; Allan Stewart; Michael Hirst; Raymond Robertson
Murdo Fraser	Mid Scotland and Fife	2 September 2011		David McLetchie; Gavin Brown; Alex Johnstone; Alex Fergusson; Liz Smith; Nanette Milne; Jamie McGrigor; Struan Stevenson MEP; Malcolm Rifkind MP; Peter Duncan; John Purvis; John Corrie; James Provan; Leaders of Conservative groups: Aberdeenshire; Angus; Dumfries and Galloway; Edinburgh; Fife; Perth and Kinross; Stirling
Ruth Davidson	Glasgow	4 September 2011		David Mundell MP; John Lamont; John Scott; Sir Albert McQuarrie; Michael Ancram; Lord Sanderson; Lord Forsyth; Lord Strathclyde
Margaret Mitchell	Central Scotland	11 September 2011	N/A	None declared

=== Jackson Carlaw MSP ===
Jackson Carlaw had been MSP for the West Scotland region since 2007 and was the then party spokesman on energy, transport and climate change. He was previously the deputy chairman of the Scottish Conservatives, chairman of the party's youth wing, Conservative Future Scotland, and board member of the UK-wide Conservatives. He had unsuccessfully contested the Scottish Parliament constituency of Eastwood three times, holding a notional majority of over 3,500 votes on the third occasion. He was the first contender to declare their candidacy, on 10 August 2011, and launched his campaign on 2 September.

Carlaw was described as being on the right of the party, and was against transferring further powers to Holyrood. Upon launching his campaign, he declared that the referendum on Scottish independence should take place before any discussion over further devolution. He also declared that he was the "unity option" for party members.

=== Murdo Fraser MSP ===
Murdo Fraser had been MSP for Mid Scotland and Fife since 2001, party spokesman on health and the deputy leader of the party between 2005–11. A former chairman of the Scottish Young Conservatives (1989–92), he unsuccessfully contested the seat of Tayside North five times at the Scottish and Westminster elections. He belonged to the Conservative Christian Fellowship, the Scotland Malawi Partnership and had been Parliamentary Advisor to the Autism Treatment Trust. Fraser declared his candidacy on 26 August.

Regarded as being to the right of the party, Fraser supported greater tax and spending powers for the Scottish Parliament in the form of further financial devolution. On 1 September, Fraser outlined his vision for 'New Unionism', with the intention of 'killing independence' and then 'break[ing] the SNP'. He stated his rejection of full fiscal autonomy for Scotland, calling it 'independence in disguise', but pledged support for financial devolution, which he claimed would make Parliament more accountable for the money it spends. On 4 September, Fraser made a high-profile announcement, that if elected, he would disband the party in favour of setting up a new centre-right party fully autonomous of the UK Conservative Party, but would take the Conservative whip at Westminster. Fraser stated that this would be done to 'de-toxify' the party in Scotland, saying that it would have a distinct Scottish identity, would represent Scottish values, would support devolution and decentralisation, and would fight to maintain Scotland's place within the United Kingdom. He also would rename the party – dropping the name 'Conservative' – with possible new names cited as Scottish Reform Party, Scottish Unionists, The Scottish Progressives, the Progressive Conservatives, Scotland First, Scotland Forward, Caledonian Party or The Caledonians. The name 'Unionist' was downplayed, so as to avoid connotation to Northern Ireland sectarianism, and because a smaller Scottish Unionist Party also existed, this rendered a change to this name impossible under electoral law.

The plan would see a return to the situation of conservatism in Scotland between 1912 and 1965, when the Scottish Unionist Party was completely autonomous of the Conservative Party in England and Wales, but took the Conservative whip at Westminster, and even contributed two UK Prime Ministers: Bonar Law and Alec Douglas-Home. Fraser noted that during this time the then-known Unionists achieved their best result in Scotland; in 1955, they won more seats than Labour, and took over 50% of the vote, a feat that no political party had achieved in a Scottish election since. However, after the events of 1965, when the Unionist Party merged into the UK-wide Conservative Party, the party began a decline which culminated in the loss of all Scottish Conservative seats in 1997. Fraser also cited examples of the situation existing successfully in other countries: for instance, in Germany, the centre-right Christian Social Union in Bavaria takes the whip of the Christian Democratic Union in the Bundestag, but maintains autonomy as a party.

On 11 October Fraser outlined ten pledges to fulfill, shown below, were he to win the contest:

- Hold monthly conference calls with constituency association chairmen.
- Hold regular 'candidate conferences' to ensure that candidates receive the support they need.
- Restore real debate and votes on policy at Party Conferences.
- Develop a new national and local media strategy to ensure that the party would obtain greater coverage.
- Introduce a national and local online and social media strategy to raise the party profile and take its message to younger voters in particular.
- Work closely with the youth wing in the party and target younger professionals to become voters, members and candidates.
- Set up a special committee to organise fundraising for all campaigns throughout Scotland.
- Establish national policy groups with experts from both inside and outside the party, and give every constituency the opportunity to provide input to these groups.
- Establish an annual awards programme to recognise outstanding effort by associations, candidates and individuals.
- Visit every constituency at least once a year.

Fraser declared his opposition to the centralisation of Scottish police forces on 25 October, saying: "Such a centralisation of power is incompatible with a belief in localism that is common across western European centre-right parties".

=== Ruth Davidson MSP ===
Ruth Davidson had been MSP for the Glasgow region since 2011 and party spokeswoman on culture. She formerly contested the Westminster seat of Glasgow East at a by-election in 2009 and at the 2010 General Election. Davidson declared her candidacy on 4 September, the same day that Murdo Fraser made his pitch to disband the Scottish Conservatives and start up a new party.

Davidson was described as more politically moderate than her main opponents and she opposed the notion of Scottish Conservatives separating from the UK-wide party and renaming itself.

=== Margaret Mitchell MSP ===
A former Justice of the Peace, Mitchell had represented the Central Scotland region in the Scottish Parliament since 2003. She declared in July her support for Lord Forsyth, however Forsyth declared his backing for another candidate in September. On the day of nominations closing on 23 September, Mitchell declared that she would stand in the contest, having received the necessary 100 nominations.

She opposed the Scotland Bill 2011, calling its proposal to vary tax by 10p as 'crazy', and voiced opposition to the idea of Scottish Conservatives disbanding into a new centre-right party.

=== Speculated candidates who did not stand in the contest ===
- John Lamont – MSP for Ettrick, Roxburgh & Berwickshire and party spokesman on justice. Lamont had strongly hinted that he would run for the leadership, shortly after the Scottish parliament elections. However, in June 2010, Lamont attacked the system of state-funded Roman Catholic education in west-central Scotland, reportedly 'self-destructing' his chances of standing for leadership. In August 2011, he confirmed that he would not stand in the contest and eventually lent his backing to Ruth Davidson.
- Gavin Brown – then-MSP for the Lothian region since 2007, and party spokesman on the economy. On 1 September, Brown stated that, after consideration, he would not stand in the contest and declared his support for Murdo Fraser.
- Alex Fergusson – then-MSP for Galloway & West Dumfries and former Presiding Officer of the Scottish Parliament. Fergusson ruled out any prospect of him standing for leadership on election night, saying that he was 'too old' and eventually backed Murdo Fraser.
- Annabel Goldie – Former party leader (2005–11) and MSP for West of Scotland. Goldie confirmed during her resignation, that she would not contest the forthcoming leadership election.
- Michael Forsyth – Former Secretary of State for Scotland under John Major (1995–97) and MP for Stirling (1983–97), now sits in the House of Lords as 'Baron Forsyth of Drumlean'. Margaret Mitchell had said she would support him if he stood in the contest, however on 11 September, Forsyth declared his backing for Ruth Davidson and Mitchell went on to declare her own candidacy.

== Reaction to Murdo Fraser's proposal ==
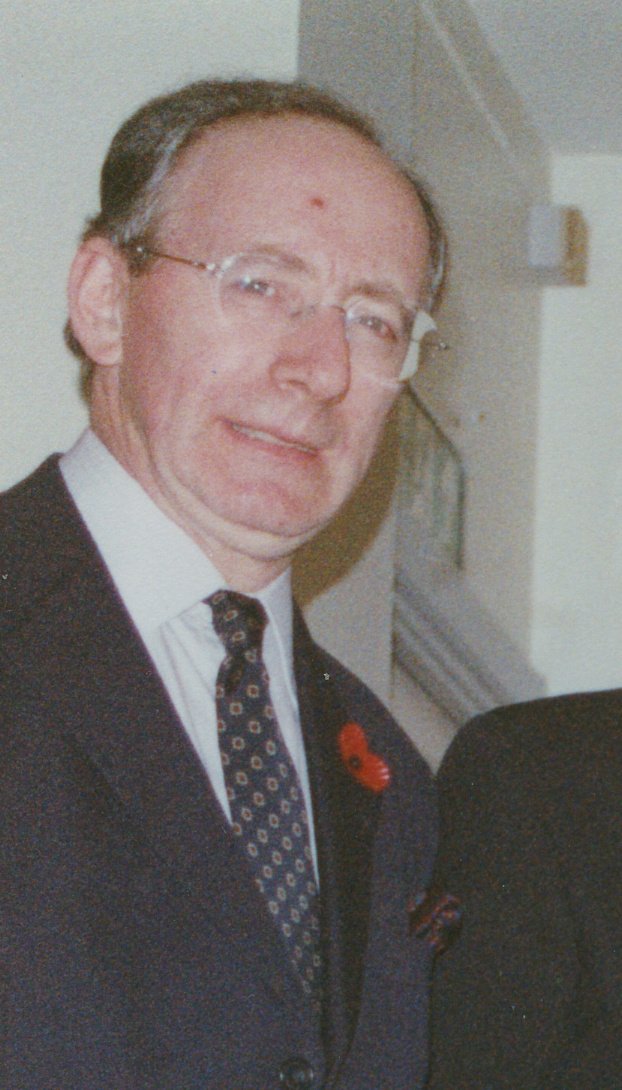
Former Secretary of State for Scotland, Malcolm Rifkind, supports the idea.

Murdo Fraser announced on 4 September 2011 his idea to disband the Scottish Conservatives and create a new centre-right party. The idea received mixed reception amongst senior Conservatives, with former Scottish Secretary under John Major Lord Forsyth calling the plan 'ludicrous'. However, his predecessor under Margaret Thatcher, Sir Malcolm Rifkind, called it 'refreshing' and stated that it should be given serious consideration. The Education Secretary Michael Gove, who was born and raised in Scotland but represents an English constituency, welcomed the idea, calling it a sign of genuine 'revival, political and intellectually' of the centre-right in Scotland, whereas former Defence Secretary Liam Fox, also a Scot representing an English constituency, stated that he opposed the idea. No word was received on Prime Minister David Cameron's viewpoint; however, his close ally Francis Maude pledged support for the idea.

Scotland Office minister David Mundell, the only Scottish Conservative MP, initially said that it would "take a very great deal of convincing" to make him support the idea, but later came out in stark opposition to the plan, calling it 'betrayal' and stated that he would still run as a Conservative at the next general election whether or not Fraser was successful. Several other senior Conservative figures, including Norman Tebbit and Daniel Hannan supported Fraser's plan.

Fraser was backed by over half the MSP group, though all three of the other leadership contenders oppose the idea. Rival candidate Jackson Carlaw called the idea a 'distraction', and said it would 'divide and not unite the party'.

== Campaign controversy ==
On 5 October 2011, the Scottish Conservative media director Ramsay Jones was suspended from his duties during the leadership contest, after it was revealed that he had met Davidson and her campaign team in her flat on Sunday, 18 September. This breached his impartial status. However, Jones was reinstated in his role after Davidson was elected leader.

On 11 September 2011, Davidson sacked her election agent and parliamentary assistant Ross McFarlane after a newspaper unearthed camera footage of McFarlane drunkenly trying to burn a European Union flag while someone else off camera made anti-Catholic sectarian remarks in a Glasgow street in November 2010.

== Campaign hustings ==
A series of hustings took place during the campaign, in which the four contestants debated one another.

Date	Location	Notes
24 September	Inverness	
2–5 October	Manchester	At UK party conference.
14 October	Perth	
15 October	Dundee	
17 October	Edinburgh	
21 October	Dumfries	
22 October	Giffnock	
29 October	Banchory	Jackson Carlaw was absent from this debate after being hospitalised with appendicitis.

== Results ==
2011 Scottish Conservatives leadership election
Party	Candidate	FPv%	Count	
Party	Candidate	FPv%	1	2
Conservative	Ruth Davidson	40.13	2,278	✓ 2,983
Conservative	Murdo Fraser	36.93	2,096	2,417
Conservative	Jackson Carlaw	14.62	830	
Conservative	Margaret Mitchell	8.32	472	
Electorate: Valid: 5,676 Spoilt: Quota: 2,839 Turnout: 63.8%

1st preference vote
Ruth Davidson	40.13%
Murdo Fraser	36.93%
Jackson Carlaw	14.62%
Margaret Mitchell	8.32%

2 candidate preferred
Ruth Davidson	55.25%
Murdo Fraser	44.75%

== Reaction to result ==
Prime Minister and Conservative Party leader David Cameron congratulated Davidson on her win, saying that he looked "forward to working with her to strengthen the Union and build a better future for Scotland". Outgoing Scottish Conservative leader Annabel Goldie also offered congratulations, stating her confidence that "[Davidson] is more than equal" to challenging Alex Salmond." Murdo Fraser conceded defeat, saying he was "disappointed that I was not able to persuade more of our members that my vision for the future is the correct one", but pledged to support Davidson as leader.

First Minister and SNP leader Alex Salmond congratulated Davidson, but noted that Davidson had a large task ahead in motivating her party. Scottish Labour leader Iain Gray said that following in Annabel Goldie's footsteps would be a "big task" for Davidson, while the Scottish Liberal Democrat leader Willie Rennie expressed willingness to work with her against the majority SNP government.

The day after the result, leading Scottish Conservative supporter Paul McBride QC resigned from the party citing disagreements, particularly with their policy on anti-sectarianism legislation; McBride accused Davidson of having "no policies".

In an interview with the BBC, leading party donor John McGlynn, who had supported Murdo Fraser, warned Davidson that she had a difficult job ahead of her and needed to develop policies that "resonated" with the Scottish people, claiming that the next 7–10 days would be especially critical. McGlynn said that the view amongst other party donors was "mixed", and that he believed Davidson was elected with "interference from the center".

Murdo Fraser refused a post in the new Shadow Cabinet, but was tipped to eventually lead the Scottish Conservative campaign to secure a 'No' vote in the forthcoming referendum.

=== Post leadership election events ===
In the 2016 Scottish Parliament election, the Conservatives gained 16 MSPs, beating the Labour Party into third place. Ruth Davidson subsequently became the leader of the second largest party in the Parliament; Murdo Fraser was appointed Shadow Cabinet Secretary for Finance, and Jackson Carlaw was appointed as party Deputy Leader, as well as the Shadow Cabinet Secretary for Culture, Tourism and External Affairs.

In the 2017 UK general election, the Scottish Conservatives gained 12 seats from the SNP, including Alex Salmond (former First Minister and Leader of the SNP) and Angus Robertson (Deputy Leader of the SNP).

== Timeline of events ==
9 May – Annabel Goldie announces her resignation as Scottish Conservative leader.

5 Aug – John Lamont, after much speculation, announces that he will not stand in the leadership contest.

10 Aug – Jackson Carlaw declares he will stand in the contest.

26 Aug – Murdo Fraser declares he will stand in the contest.

29 Aug – Struan Stevenson MEP, Alex Johnstone MSP, Alex Fergusson MSP and Liz Smith MSP endorse Murdo Fraser.

30 Aug – Liz Smith is declared as Murdo Fraser's campaign manager.

1 Sep – Gavin Brown, formerly speculated as standing in the election, states that he will not run and lends his backing to Murdo Fraser.

2 Sep – Jackson Carlaw officially launches his leadership campaign in Glasgow.

4 Sep – Murdo Fraser makes the high-profile announcement that if elected leader, he would disband the Scottish Conservatives and seek to create a new centre-right party, autonomous but allied to the UK Conservative Party. This prompts mixed reactions from senior party figures.

4 Sep – Ruth Davidson formally announces that she will stand in the contest.

5 Sep – Murdo Fraser launches his campaign in Edinburgh.

8 Sep – Ruth Davidson launches her campaign in Edinburgh.

11 Sep – Lord Forsyth, at one point a suggested leadership candidate, declares his backing for Ruth Davidson.

23 Sep – Nominations for leadership close. Margaret Mitchell confirms she will stand in the election.

2 Oct – David Mundell MP declares his backing for Ruth Davidson and states that should Fraser win, Mundell would still run as a Conservative at the 2015 election.

10 Oct – Ballot papers are distributed to Scottish Conservative party members.

4 Nov – Ruth Davidson is declared the new leader of the Scottish Conservatives.

== See also ==
- 2011 Scottish Labour Party leadership election
- 2011 Scottish Liberal Democrats leadership election
