= Andrew Fulton (diplomat) =

British politician (born 1944)

Robert Andrew Fulton (born 6 February 1944) is a lawyer, diplomat, businessman and politician who was appointed chairman of the Scottish Conservative Party in February 2008. He held the position until 5 November 2011.

== Biography ==
Born in Glasgow he grew up on the Isle of Bute and attended Rothesay Academy. Later he went on to study law at the University of Glasgow, graduating MA, LLB (1962–1967). In 1967 he captained Glasgow University golf team to victory in the British Universities Championship at Royal Troon and won the individual stroke play medal himself. A former champion and Captain of Rothesay Golf Club (1966) he tied for the championship at Saigon Golf Club (1971) and won the club championship at Olgiata Golf Club in Rome (1974).

Fulton was previously a member of HM Diplomatic Service from 1968 to 1999 with postings in Saigon, Rome, East Berlin, Oslo, the UK mission to the UN in New York, and finally Washington DC.

In 2000, while a visiting professor at the Glasgow University School of Law, he stepped down as a member of the Lockerbie Trial Briefing Unit, responsible for briefing media on the Pan Am Flight 103 bombing trial, after speculation about his previous role in British Intelligence.

Amongst a number of non-executive and advisory roles since 1999, Fulton is Honorary President (formerly founding Chairman) of the Scottish North American Business Council. In the security and investigations sector, he has occupied senior roles with Control Risks, Armor Group, Memex Technology, IndigoVision and GPW Ltd. In 2012 he was appointed to the international advisory board of International Street Papers (INSP).

Fulton is currently Chairman of Validate ID Ltd, GloblMed Ltd, Unit-382 Limited and Smart Authentication Limited.

When Fulton was appointed Chairman of the Scottish Conservatives, the media reported that he had previously been Washington head of station for Britain's Secret Intelligence Service.

Following his appointment, the Scottish National Party criticised descriptions of Fulton as a "visiting professor" at the University of Glasgow, despite not being affiliated with the university since 2000.

In September 2011, while he was chairman, the party approved a new constitution.

He was still chairman on 5 October 2011 and on 5 November 2011, but David Mundell MP became the acting chairman of the party in November 2011. On 4 November 2011 Ruth Davidson won the party leadership election; she appointed Mundell as interim party chairman the next day.
