= Michael Forsyth, Baron Forsyth of Drumlean =

British politician and life peer (born 1954)

The Right Honourable The Lord Forsyth of Drumlean PC
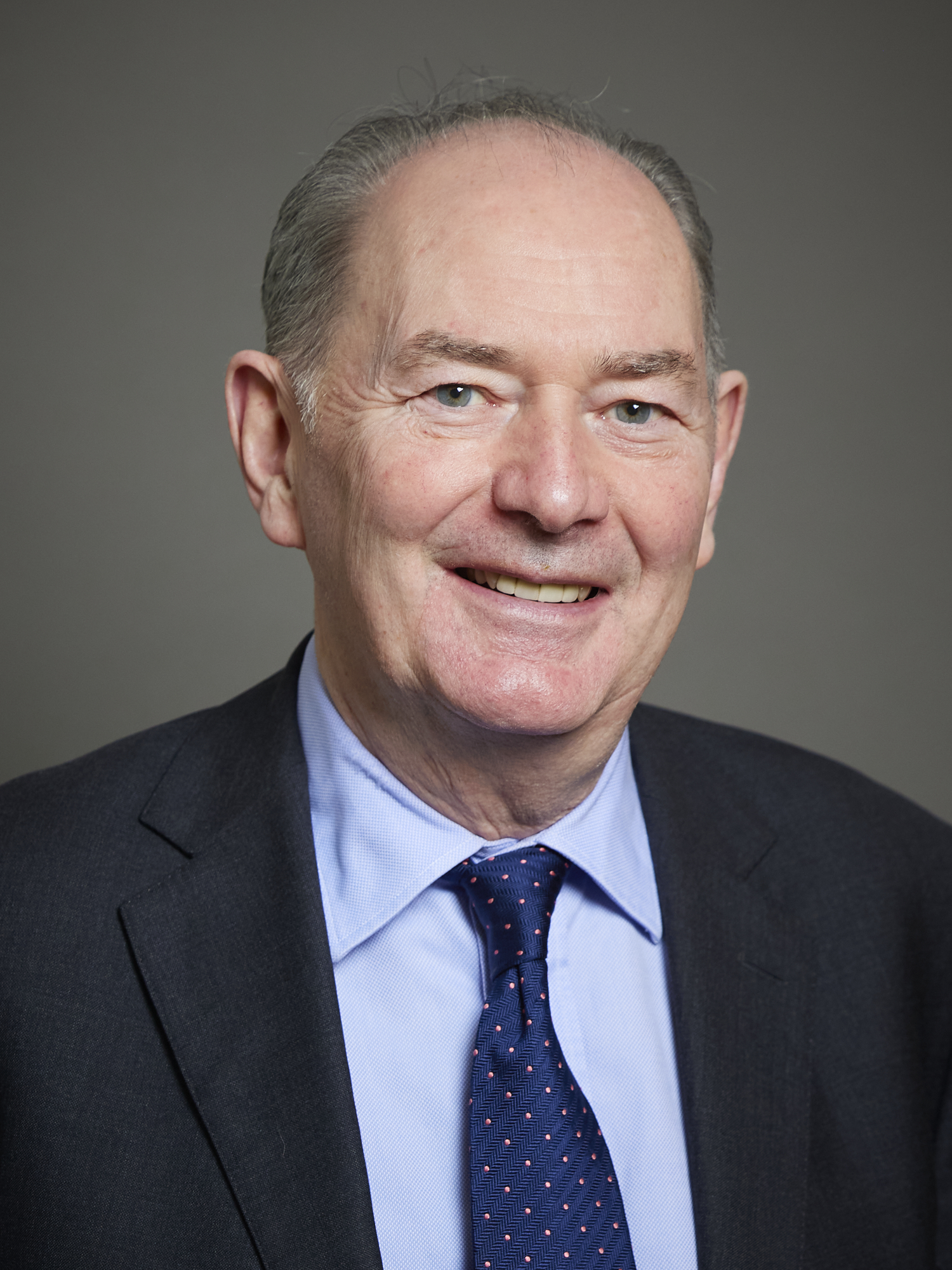
- Official portrait, 2024

Lord Speaker
- Incumbent
- Assumed office 2 February 2026
- Monarch: Charles III
- Deputy: The Lord Ponsonby of Shulbrede
- Preceded by: The Lord McFall of Alcluith

Chair of the Economic Affairs Committee
- In office 27 June 2017 – 19 January 2022
- Preceded by: The Lord Hollick
- Succeeded by: The Lord Bridges of Headley

Secretary of State for Scotland
- In office 5 June 1995 – 2 May 1997
- Prime Minister: John Major
- Preceded by: Ian Lang
- Succeeded by: Donald Dewar

Minister of State for Home Affairs
- In office 20 July 1994 – 5 June 1995
- Prime Minister: John Major
- Preceded by: The Earl Ferrers
- Succeeded by: Ann Widdecombe

Minister of State for Employment
- In office 14 April 1992 – 20 July 1994
- Prime Minister: John Major
- Preceded by: Eric Forth
- Succeeded by: Ann Widdecombe

Minister of State for Scotland
- In office 7 September 1990 – 14 April 1992
- Prime Minister: Margaret Thatcher; John Major
- Preceded by: The Lord Sanderson of Bowden
- Succeeded by: The Lord Fraser of Carmyllie

Member of the House of Lords
- Lord Temporal
- Life peerage 14 July 1999

Member of Parliament for Stirling
- In office 9 June 1983 – 8 April 1997
- Preceded by: Constituency established
- Succeeded by: Anne McGuire

Personal details
- Born: Michael Bruce Forsyth; 16 October 1954 (age 71) Montrose, Scotland
- Party: None (Lord Speaker) (since 2026)
- Other political affiliations: Conservative (before 2026)
- Spouse: Susan Clough (m. 1977)
- Children: 3
- Education: University of St Andrews

Michael Bruce Forsyth, Baron Forsyth of Drumlean, PC (born 16 October 1954) is a Scottish financier and politician, who has held the office of Lord Speaker, the presiding officer of the House of Lords, since February 2026. Formerly affiliated with the Conservative Party, he was the Member of Parliament (MP) for Stirling from 1983 to 1997 and served in the cabinet of John Major as Secretary of State for Scotland from 1995 to 1997.

He retired as Chairman of Secure Trust Bank in May 2024 and as a Director of J&J Denholm and of Denholm Logistics Ltd in January 2026. He was a director and Chairman of Hyperion Insurance Group until its merger with RKH Group in 2015. A former Deputy Chairman of JPMorgan UK and Evercore Partners International, he was knighted in 1997 and appointed to the House of Lords in 1999. He is a member of the Privy Council and served on the Development Boards of the Royal Society and the National Portrait Gallery. He is also a past president of the Royal Highland and Agricultural Society of Scotland.

He was appointed for a second term to the House of Lords' Economic Affairs Committee in 2015, and as its chairman following the election in 2017. He was elected as Chairman of the Association of Conservative Peers in September 2021, retiring on 28 January 2026 (the House of Lords' equivalent to the House of Commons' 1922 Committee). Forsyth was appointed the chair of the Financial Services Regulation Committee in January 2024 and retired in January 2026. He resigned as president of the Steamboat Association of Great Britain in February 2026.

== Early life ==
Forsyth was born in Montrose, Angus, the eldest son of John T. and Mary Forsyth. He was educated at Arbroath High School and the University of St Andrews (1972–76). He was President of the Conservative Association at St Andrews University from 1973 to 1976.

== Parliamentary career ==
After leaving university Forsyth was first elected to Westminster City Council from 1978 to 1983.

He was then elected at the 1983 General Election as the MP for the Stirling constituency. His first job in government was as Parliamentary private secretary to the then Foreign Secretary Geoffrey Howe from 1986 to 1987. In 1987, he was appointed to the Scottish Office, first as an Under-Secretary of State (1987–90), then as Minister of State (1990–92) with responsibility over health, education, social work and sport. He was also the chair of the Scottish Conservative Party from 1989 to 1990. In 1996, he was named Parliamentarian of the Year.

He was appointed Minister of State at the Department of Employment (1992–94), then the Home Office (1994–95), he became a member of John Major's cabinet in 1995 as Secretary of State for Scotland. In 1996, as Scottish Secretary, Forsyth was credited with transferring the Stone of Scone, also known as the Stone of Destiny, from Westminster Abbey to (ultimately) Edinburgh Castle.

Forsyth was re-elected in 1987 and 1992 with small majorities of less than a thousand, but lost his seat in the 1997 general election.

== Politics in Scotland ==
Forsyth campaigned against the Scottish Parliament having the power to vary the basic rate of income tax by up to three pence in the pound, which he dubbed the "Tartan Tax". Forsyth's persistence was widely credited with prompting the Labour Party's unexpected decision – bitterly criticised by the Liberal Democrats and the Scottish National Party – to separate out the tax-varying issue in a two-question referendum on devolution.

In 2009–10 he was a member of the Sanderson Commission that reported on Conservative Party organisation, and in 2010–11 a member of the independent Philips inquiry into the 1994 Scotland RAF Chinook crash on the Mull of Kintyre, established by the Secretary of State for Defence.

In 2011, Forsyth criticised the plans of Conservative MSP Murdo Fraser to disband the Scottish Conservatives and establish a wholly new centre-right party, should he win the forthcoming leadership election. Forsyth later declared his backing for a rival candidate, Ruth Davidson.

== House of Lords ==
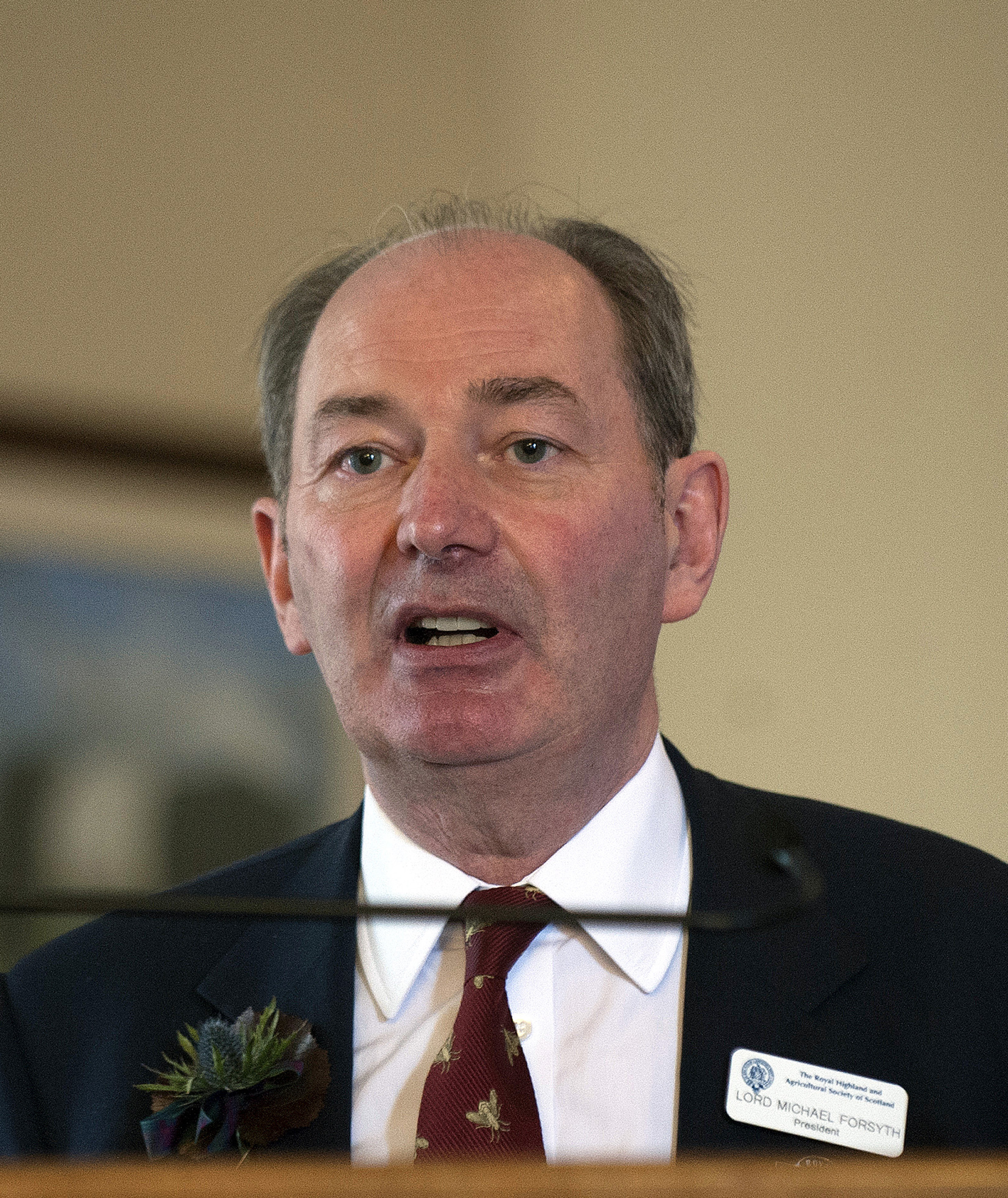
Forsyth in 2015

Forsyth was nominated to the Privy Council in 1995, was knighted in 1997 and was raised to the peerage as Baron Forsyth of Drumlean, of Drumlean in Stirling (Drumlean is a small area near Aberfoyle in the district of Stirling) on 14 July 1999.

Following his elevation to the Lords, he has held a number of positions. He was a member of the Commission on Strengthening Parliament (1999–2000), the Select Committee on the Monetary Policy Committee of the Bank of England, the Joint Committee of both Houses of Parliament on Reform of the House of Lords, and the Select Committee on the Barnett Formula.

From October 2005 to October 2006, he was Chairman of the Conservative Party's Tax Reform Commission, established by then Shadow Chancellor of the Exchequer, George Osborne MP. He served as a member of the House of Lords select committee on Economic Affairs from 2007 to 2011. He has also been a member of the joint committee on National Security Strategy and a member of the special select committee on soft power. He was appointed for a second term to the House of Lords' Economic Affairs Committee in 2015, and as its chairman following the election in 2017. In 2021, he was elected as Chairman of the Association of Conservative Peers.

Forsyth was appointed the chair of the Financial Services Regulation Committee in 2024.

He was one of two candidates in the 2026 Lord Speaker election. He was elected to the office and presided for the first time on 2 February 2026.

== Business career ==
After leaving the House of Commons Forsyth has undertaken posts in the City of London. He joined Robert Fleming as a director of Corporate Finance and, following the bank's sale to JPMorgan Chase he became vice-chairman Investment Banking Europe at JPMorgan (1999–2001) and then Deputy Chairman of JPMorgan (2002–05).

He joined Evercore Partners International LLP, an investment bank, in 2005 – leaving his post as deputy chairman in March 2012. He was a director of NBNK Investments PLC, and a director and Chairman of Hyperion Insurance Group until its merger with RKH Group in 2015. He is currently Chairman of Secure Trust Bank, and a Director of J&J Denholm Ltd and of Denholm Logistics Ltd.

== Philanthropy and personal life ==
Forsyth married Susan Clough in Cumbria in 1977 and they have three children. He is the founder of the Pimlico Tree and Preservation Trust, now the Westminster Tree Trust. In 2010 he climbed the highest mountain in Antarctica, Mount Vinson, in support of CINI and Marie Curie Cancer Care, having previously climbed Mount Aconcagua and Mount Kilimanjaro, the highest mountains in the Americas and Africa respectively. His charity fund-raising achievements are substantial and include £220,000 for DebRA for climbing Mount Kilimanjaro, £420,000 for CINI and Marie Curie Cancer Care for climbing Mount Vinson, and £500,000 to support the families of victims of 9/11 through organising a dinner in the City of London.

== Bibliography ==
- Reservicing Britain (London: Adam Smith Institute, 1980)
- The Myths of Privatisation (London: Adam Smith Institute, 1983)

== Arms ==
Coat of arms of Michael Forsyth, Baron Forsyth of Drumlean
Crest A griffin sergeant Azure armed and membered Gules crowned Or and charged on the shoulder with a mascle Argent. Escutcheon Argent a chevronnel engrailed Gules between in chief two griffins respectant Azure armed and membered Gules crowned Or and supporting a square block of roughly dressed sandstone being a representation of the Stone of Destiny Proper with a ring at each end Sable and in base a hurt charged with a mascle Argent. Supporters Two griffins Azure armed and membered Sable crowned Or and each charged on the shoulder with a mascle Argent. Motto Learn From The Past

== Bibliography ==
- Torrance, David, The Scottish Secretaries (Birlinn 2006)

Parliament of the United Kingdom
New constituency	Member of Parliament for Stirling; 1983–1997	Succeeded by Anne McGuire
Preceded by The Lord McFall of Alcluith	Lord Speaker; 2026–present	Incumbent
Political offices
Preceded by Ian Lang	Secretary of State for Scotland; 1995–1997	Succeeded by Donald Dewar
Orders of precedence in the United Kingdom
Preceded by Sir Lindsay Hoyle as Speaker of the House of Commons	Gentlemen as a Baron of the United Kingdom	Succeeded by The Lord Reed of Allermuir as President of the Supreme Court
