= 2026 Lord Speaker election =

House of Lords presiding officer election

- 6–8 January 2026
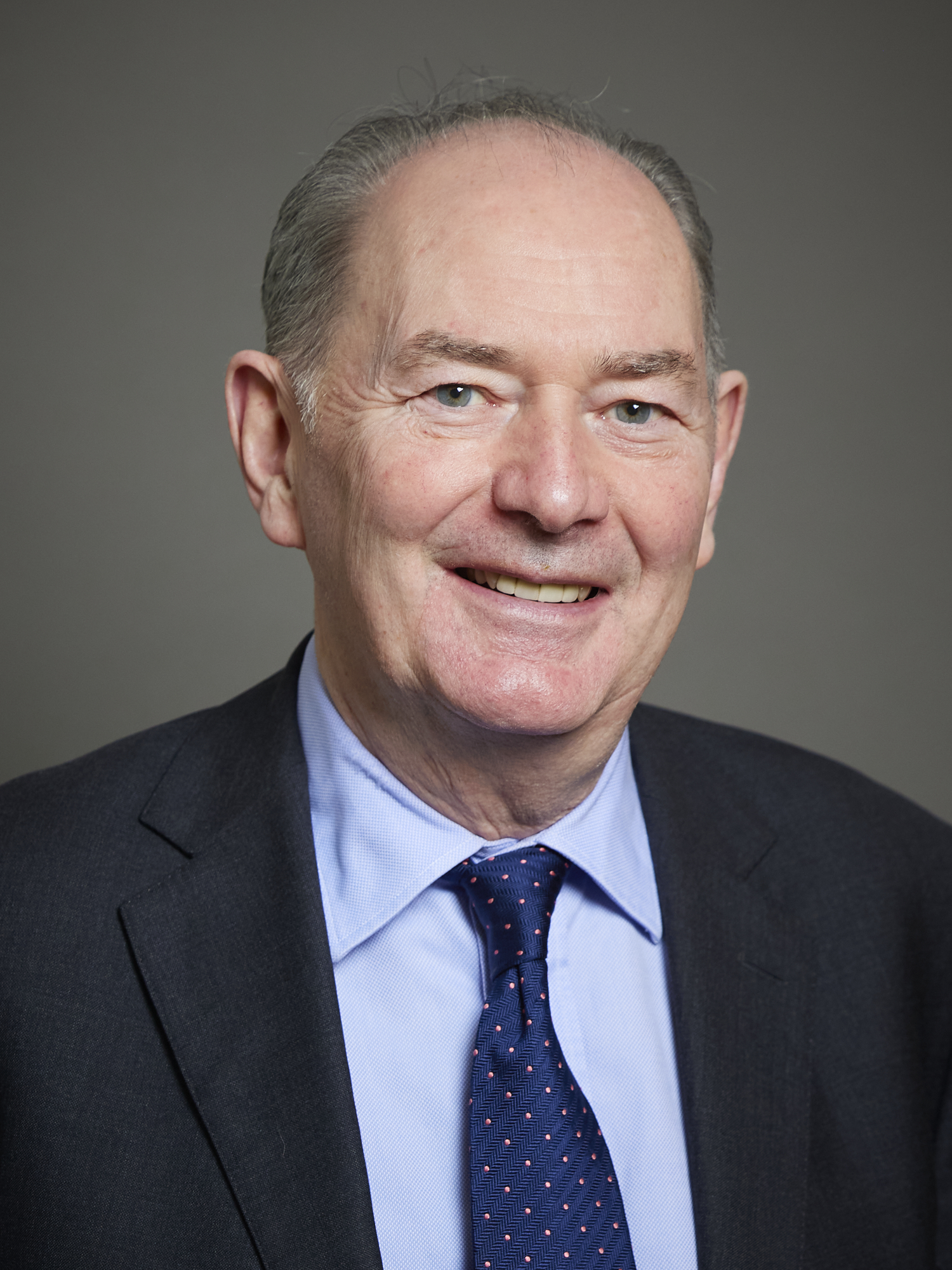

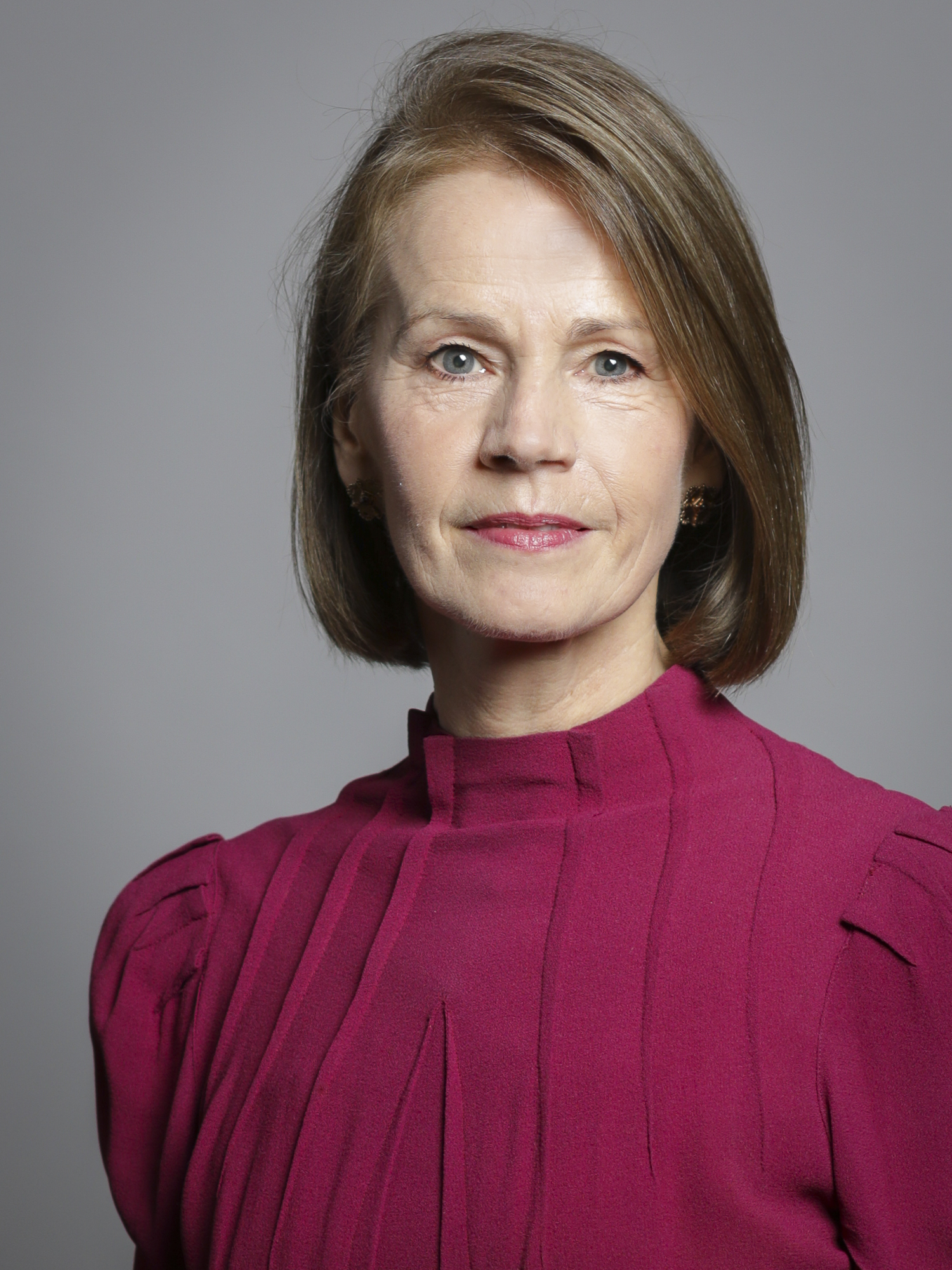
	First party	Second party
Candidate	The Lord Forsyth of Drumlean	The Baroness Bull
Party	Conservative	Crossbench
Popular vote	383	297
Percentage	56.3%	43.7%
Lord Speaker before election
The Lord McFall of Alcluith
Elected Lord Speaker
The Lord Forsyth of Drumlean

An election for Lord Speaker, the presiding office of the House of Lords, was held from 6 to 8 January 2026. On 15 October 2025, the incumbent, Lord McFall of Alcluith, resigned from the office with effect from 2 February 2026.

== Election procedure and timetable ==
Members of the House of Lords who wished to stand for election were required to have a proposer and a seconder. All members who had taken the oath in the current parliament by 27 November 2025 and were not on leave of absence, disqualified or suspended from the House were eligible to stand. All members who had taken the oath in the current parliament by 18 December 2025 and were not on leave of absence, disqualified, suspended or temporarily excluded from the House were eligible to vote. The election was held by postal and electronic voting.

Timetable was as follows:

- Thursday 27 November 2025 (5 p.m.) – Candidate registration deadline
- Monday 1 December 2025 – List of candidates published
- Friday 5 December 2025 – Postal voting registration deadline
- Tuesday 9 December 2025 – Hustings
- Thursday 11 December 2025 – Ballot papers sent to members requesting a postal vote
- Tuesday 6 January 2026 (10 a.m.) – Electronic voting opened
- Thursday 8 January 2026 (5 p.m.) – Electronic voting closed and deadline for postal votes to be returned
- Monday 12 January 2026 – Result announced and King's approval notified
- Monday 2 February 2026 – New Lord Speaker took office and presided for the first time

== Candidates ==
The following members of the House were registered as candidates:

- Baroness Bull (Crossbencher) – proposed by Baroness Thornton and Lord Ricketts
- Lord Forsyth of Drumlean (Conservative) – proposed by Lord Blunkett and Baroness Butler-Sloss

== Result ==
Election of Lord Speaker, 6–8 January 2026
Party	Candidate	Count 1
Conservative	✓ The Lord Forsyth of Drumlean	383
Crossbench	The Baroness Bull	297
Electorate: 814 Valid: 680 Quota: 340 Turnout: 680
