= Andrew Fulton =

Andrew Fulton may refer to:

- Andrew S. Fulton (1800–1884), U.S. Representative, lawyer and judge from Virginia
- Andrew Fulton (mayor) (1850–1925), mayor of Pittsburgh, 1884–1887
- Andrew Fulton (admiral) (1927–2021), Canadian admiral
- Andrew Fulton (diplomat) (born 1944), British diplomat and chairman of the Scottish Conservative Party
