= Robert Fulton (disambiguation) =

Robert Fulton (1765–1815) was an American inventor.

Robert Fulton may also refer to:

- Robert L. Fulton (1847–1920), railroad agent and newspaper publisher in Reno, Nevada
- Robert Burwell Fulton (1849–1919), American university administrator
- Bertie Fulton (Robert Patrick Fulton, 1906–1979), amateur footballer from Northern Ireland
- Robert Edison Fulton Jr. (1909–2004), American inventor and adventurer
- Robert B. Fulton (1910–2015), U.S. Navy admiral
- Rikki Fulton (Robert Kerr Fulton, 1924–2004), Scottish comedian and actor
- Robert D. Fulton (1929–2024), Governor of Iowa
- Bob Fulton (1947–2021), Australian rugby league player
- Robert Fulton (Royal Marines officer) (born 1948), former British Governor of Gibraltar
- Bobby Fulton (born 1960), American wrestler
- Robert J. Fulton (1826–1895), American Jesuit educator and president of Boston College

== Other uses ==
- Bobby Fulton (James Hines, born 1960), American wrestler
- Robert Fulton Birthplace, a stone house in Pennsylvania
- Robert Fulton (Roberts), a 1889 sculpture depicting the American inventor
