= Fultograph =

Early image transmission system

A Fultograph image, 65×129mm.

The fultograph (pronounced like "photograph") was an early, clockwork image-receiving device, similar in function to fax machines. It took signals from the loudspeaker socket of a radio receiver and used an electrochemical process to darken areas of sensitised paper wrapped on a rotating drum. Invented by Otho Fulton, the system was used briefly in the late 1920s to broadcast images to homes by radio. The machines themselves were expensive (£22 15s 0d in 1928) and required a good receiver to operate.

== Mechanism ==
The Fultograph resembled a standard cylinder phonograph, housed in a fumed oak or willow case. It featured a winding handle, a double spring, a stylus, and an alloy cylinder upon which the paper is laid. The paper is pre-treated with a potassium iodide and starch solution.

The incoming radio signal is converted to electric signal, directed to the paper. An electrochemical reaction causes the potassium iodine to redox into iodine, which then reacts with starch to create a dark color.

== History ==
Fulton patented the machine in 1927, and in collaboration with Thomas Thorne Baker and W. Watson and Son, he established 'Wireless Pictures Ltd' in 1928, a company dedicated to producing and marketing the Fultograph.

The BBC broadcast Fultograph images in 759 programmes between 1929 and 1932. It broadcast around 10 images a day from various stations.

A modified version was used by the early sonar system ASDIC to record its echos, making it possible to predict submarine trajectories and allowing precise prediction of the point at which to release the depth charges. It began at the Admiralty Research Laboratory in 1928, originally purely for research into echoes and reverberations.

In October 1929, Lufthansa successfully sent weather charts, sketch of the landing place, and a graphic description of an approaching thunder cloud, by radio fultograph to flying Junkers planes.
