= James Fulton =

James Fulton may refer to:

- James Fulton (Canadian politician) (1950–2008), member of the Parliament of Canada
- James G. Fulton (1903–1971), member of the U.S. House of Representatives
- James M. Fulton (1873–1940), American composer and bandleader
- Sir Forrest Fulton (James Forrest Fulton, 1845–1925), British judge and Member of Parliament (MP) for West Ham North 1886–1892
- James Fulton (New Zealand politician) (1830–1891), New Zealand politician and cricketer
- James Fulton (English cricketer) (born 1977), English cricketer
- James Fulton (trade unionist) (1868–1925), Scottish trade union leader
- Judge Fulton (1739–1826), judge and founder of Bass River, Nova Scotia
- James Fulton (dermatologist) (1940–2013), American dermatologist and medical researcher
- James Fulton (civil engineer) (1854–1928), New Zealand surveyor and civil engineer
- James Fulton (co-driver) (born 1992), Irish rally co-driver
