= William Fulton =

William, Bill, or Billy Fulton may refer to:

== Law and politics ==
=== United States ===
- William B. Fulton (politician) (William Burns Fulton 1877–1960), American politician from Virginia
- William D. Fulton (William Duane Fulton, 1864–1925), American politician in Ohio
- William J. Fulton (William John Fulton, 1875–1961), American jurist from Illinois
- William S. Fulton (William Savin Fulton, 1795–1844), American lawyer and politician from Arkansas
- William T. Fulton (1835–1912), American politician and lawyer from Pennsylvania
- William Fulton (urban planner) (born 1955), American urban planner and mayor of Ventura, California

=== Elsewhere ===
- Bill Fulton (Victorian politician) (William Oliver Fulton, 1891–1975)
- Bill Fulton (Queensland politician) (William John Fulton, 1909–1988)

== Sports ==
- William Fulton (1880s footballer) (fl. 1884), Scottish international footballer
- William Fulton (footballer, fl. 1897–1925), Scottish footballer
- William Fulton (boxer) (born 1916), Rhodesian boxer
- Bill Fulton (baseball) (William David Fulton, born 1963), American baseball player
- Grant Fulton (William Grant Fulton, born 1973), South African field hockey player
- Billy Fulton (Andrew James Fulton, born 1977), New Zealand rugby union player

== Other people ==
- William B. Fulton (U.S. Army) (1919–2006), United States Army officer
- William Fulton (mathematician) (William Edgar Fulton, born 1939), American mathematician
- William James Fulton (born 1968), Northern Irish loyalist
- William Shirley Fulton (1880–1964), American archeologist
