= Herbert Fulton =

Indian-born English cricketer

Career statistics
Competition	First-class
Matches	1
Runs scored	2
Batting average	–
100s/50s	0/0
Top score	2*
Catches/stumpings	0/0
- Source: Cricinfo, 8 November 2022

Herbert Angus Fulton (3 October 1872 – 23 December 1951) was an Indian-born English first-class cricketer who played one match for Worcestershire against Leicestershire, in 1914. His part in the drawn game was minimal: he scored 2 not out from number 11 in his only innings, and made no dismissals.

Fulton was born in Bangalore; he died at the age of 79 in Minehead, Somerset.
