= Robert L. Fulton =

Railroad agent and newspaper publisher

Robert Lardin Fulton (March 6, 1847 – October 25, 1920) was a railroad land agent and newspaper publisher in Reno, Nevada. Fulton was born in Ashland, Ohio on March 6, 1847, to parents Robert Fulton and Margaret Lardin. He taught himself telegraphy and became a telegraph operator and conductor for railroads in Ohio and Minnesota. In 1874 he moved to California and was train dispatcher in Lathrop and first superintendent in Visalia, California. He became a land agent for the Central Pacific Railroad responsible for transactions from Colfax, California, to Ogden, Utah. Later in his career he became owner, editor and publisher of the Reno Evening Gazette. In 1904 he was appointed the president of the Nevada Historical Society.
