= Signaller =

Specialist personnel responsible for military communications

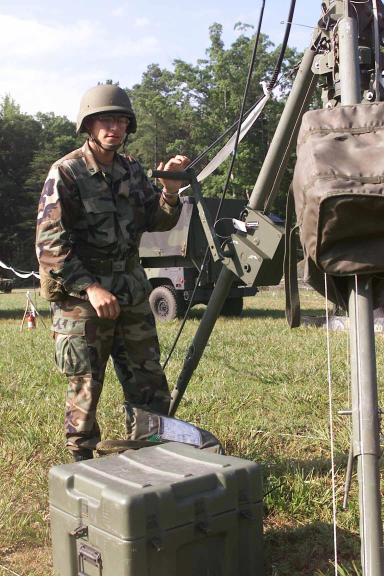
A United States Army signaller erecting a 30-metre mast antenna

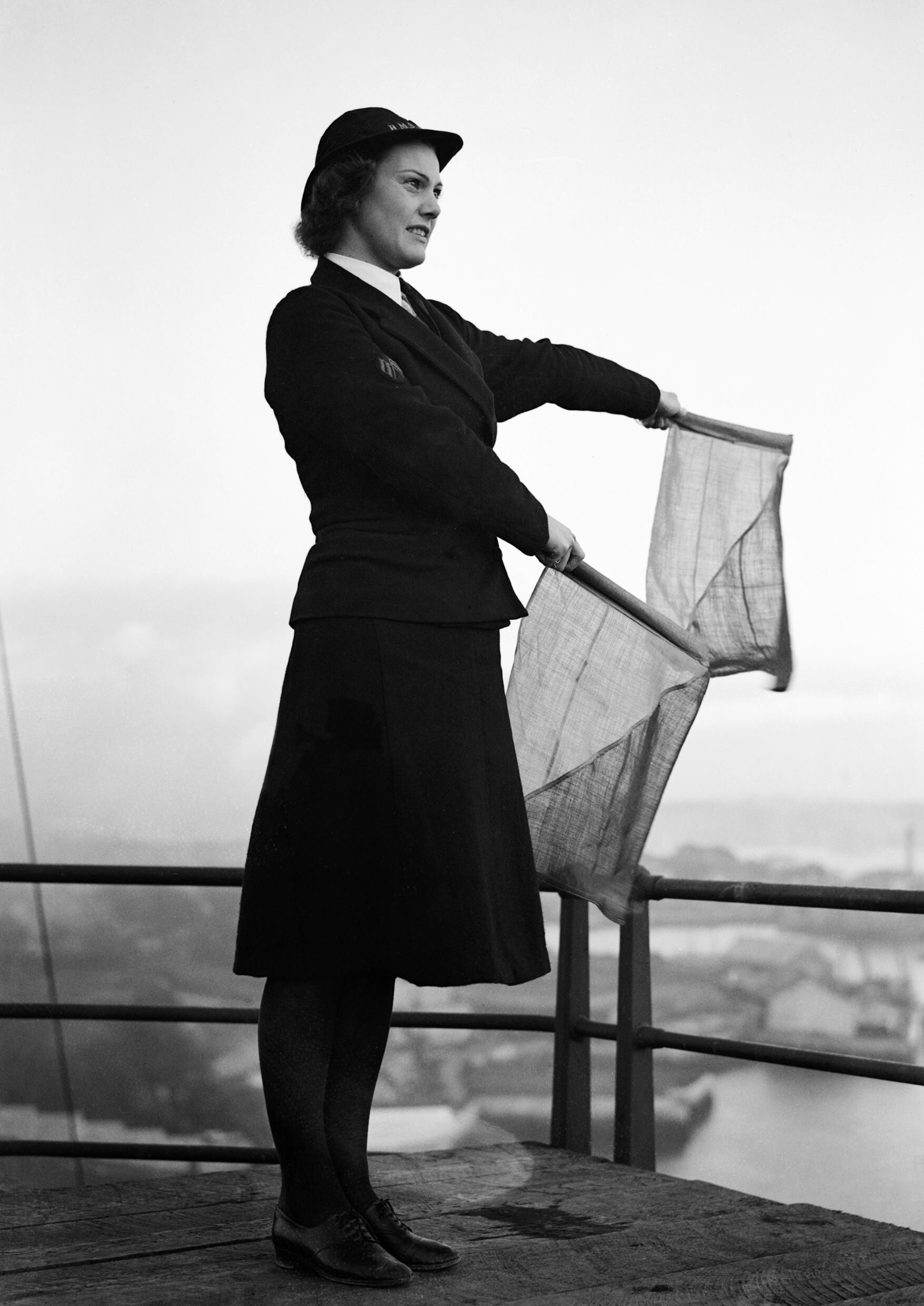
A Women's Royal Naval Service signaller with signal flags, 1940

A signaller, signalman, colloquially referred to as a radioman or signaleer in the armed forces is a specialist soldier, sailor or airman responsible for military communications. Signallers, a.k.a. Combat Signallers or signalmen or women, are commonly employed as radio or telephone operators, relaying messages for field commanders at the front line (Army units, Ships or Aircraft), through a chain of command which includes field headquarters. Messages are transmitted and received via a communications infrastructure comprising fixed and mobile installations.

== Duties ==
In the past, signalling skills have included the use of: Heliograph, Aldis lamp, semaphore flags, "Don R" (Dispatch Riders) and even carrier pigeons.

Modern signallers are responsible for the battlefield voice and data communication and information technology infrastructure or in common English terms, they may carry a backpack radio transceiver used to communicate to forward operating bases (large and small outposts for the military), using a variety of media. All types of wire (line), satellite and ionospheric radio communication are employed. These include common radio systems such as HF/VHF radio and UHF/SHF radio (operated in line of sight, for example). Cellular radio and telephone systems such as TETRA are also becoming common.

In addition to day-to-day soldiering, the signaller is required to be competent at a number of skill levels in the following topics:

- Maintaining Power Supplies (Batteries and Charging for example)
- Radio sets; storage and logistics; installation and operation; maintenance and repair at unit level.
- Station Organisation; Managing Radio Nets and Maintaining Net Discipline for example, map marking, log keeping etc.
- Voice and wireless telegraphy procedure (using Morse code or RATT (Radio assisted Teletype) for example). Formal message procedure, electronic mail.
- Electronic Warfare (EW); Communications Security (COMSEC) - including the encryption and deciphering of coded messages using paper/voice and electronic codes for example.
- Telephone and Line
- Information and Communication Technology
- Antennae selection and design

== Air Forces ==
In an air force, a signaller, an aircrew member, is a person trained to communicate between the aircraft, its base and units in the area of operation, by means of radio or other digital communications.

== Navy Forces ==
In the navy, a signaller is usually a seaman trained to communicate between the fleet forces and naval bases in the area of operation, by means of radio or other digital communications.

== Armies ==
=== Australia ===
In the Australian Army, a signaller is often referred to as a Chook (Australian Slang for Chicken) by soldiers outside the Signal Corps, because the Morse code used by Signallers has been likened to the chirping of chickens.

=== Canada ===
In the Canadian Army, a signaller is often referred to as a "Jimmy" in reference to the flag and cap badge feature Mercury (Latin: Mercurius), the winged messenger of the Roman gods, who is referred to by members of the corps as "Jimmy". The origins of this nickname are unclear. According to one explanation, the badge is referred to as "Jimmy" because the image of Mercury was based on the late medieval bronze statue by the Italian sculptor Giambologna, and shortening over time reduced the name Giambologna to "Jimmy". The most widely accepted theory of where the name Jimmy comes from is a Royal Signals boxer, called Jimmy Emblem, who was the British Army Champion in 1924 and represented the Royal Corps of Signals from 1921 to 1924.

Signallers in Canada are responsible for the majority of radio, satellite, telephone, and computer communications within the Canadian military. Trained signallers of the rank of private in Canada are referred to as "Sig" as a replacement for private (i.e. Sig Smith).

=== United Kingdom ===
In the British Army, signaller may refer to a member of the Royal Corps of Signals specifically to the rank of Signaller (formerly Signalman) or a trained signals specialist in other areas of the army such as the Infantry or Royal Artillery. The rank is equivalent to that of Private.

== Modern age ==
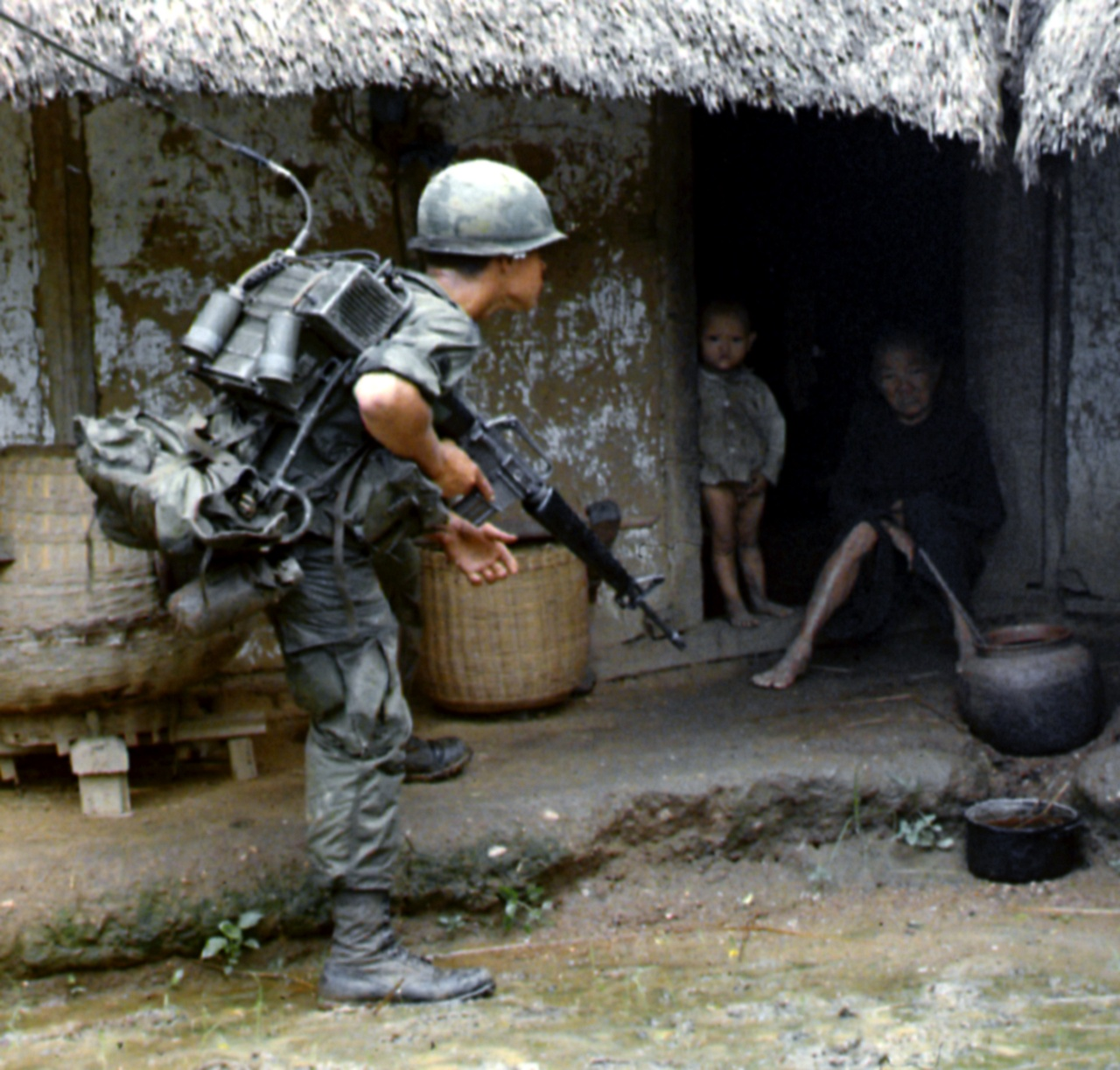
A US Army signaller AKA field telephone operator, on patrol in South Vietnam. 1966.

See also: Land Mobile Radio System, Walkie-Talkie, Transceiver

The US and European powers, especially during World War 1 and World War 2, have employed extensive use of field telephones and other methods of transmitting messages like carrier pigeons, runners were essentially army messengers and couriers that ran from place to place, culminating in the extensive World War 2, Korea and Vietnam use of the backpack transceiver, eventually becoming unit-based radio and unit-to-HQ based field "telephone".

Specially designated soldiers in a unit would and still do, have a single soldier with a backpack transceiver and large telescoping antennae that can be as tall as 10 metres or 20 feet.

It is also called RTO, which stands for "Radio Telephone Operator". At the field, soldiers usually call them RTO, rather than Signaller. They are soldiers specializing in military communications in the military, mainly operating wired/wireless communication equipment or sending telegrams to commanders from the front line according to the command line, including field headquarters and control agencies.
