= Dave Fulton =

New Zealand cricketer (born 1965)

Personal information
- Full name: John David Fulton
- Born: 7 December 1965 (age 60); Lower Hutt, New Zealand
- Source: ESPNcricinfo, 11 May 2016

John David Fulton (born 7 December 1965) is a New Zealand former cricketer. He played three List A matches for Central Districts in 1993/94.

A batsman, Fulton is the most capped player for Manawatu, with 129 appearances between 1989 and 2006. He is also Manawatu's record run-scorer, with 5,230 runs, including 11 centuries.

Fulton works as the grounds turf supervisor at Massey University. He represented New Zealand at the first over-50s world cup in 2018.
