= John Fulton (writer) =

American novelist

John Fulton is an American author based in Boston, Massachusetts, where he teaches creative writing at the University of Massachusetts Boston. He grew up in Utah and Montana, studied at Whitman College, and lived in Europe for five years. He is a 1997 graduate of the University of Michigan Creative Writing MFA Program. His story collection, The Animal Girl, was published in 2007 by Louisiana State University Press. He is the author of Retribution, which won the 2001 Southern Review Short Fiction Award for the best first collection of short stories. His novel, More Than Enough, was a Barnes & Noble Discover Great New Writers selection and a finalist for the Midland Society of Authors Award. His work has appeared in Zoetrope, Oxford American, and The Southern Review. His short story “Hunters” won a 2006 Pushcart Prize. John was the recipient of a 2024 National Endowment for the Arts Fellowship in Creative Writing.

== Novels ==
- More Than Enough (Picador, 2002)

== Short story collections ==
- Retribution (Picador, 2001)
- The Animal Girl (Louisiana State University, 2007)
- The Flounder and Other Stories (Blackwater Press, 2023)
