= Tony Fulton =

Tony Fulton may refer to:

- Tony Fulton (Nebraska politician) (born 1972), member of the Nebraska Legislature
- Tony Fulton (Maryland politician) (1951–2005), American politician in Maryland
