= Russell Sanderson, Baron Sanderson of Bowden =

British politician and life peer (1933–2026)

The Right Honourable The Lord Sanderson of Bowden

Member of the House of Lords
- Lord Temporal
- Life peerage 5 June 1985 – 29 March 2018

Personal details
- Born: Charles Russell Sanderson; 30 April 1933 Melrose, Scotland
- Died: 2 July 2026 (aged 93)
- Party: Conservative
- Education: St. Mary's School, Melrose; Glenalmond College; Bradford Technical College; Scottish Textile College

Charles Russell Sanderson, Baron Sanderson of Bowden (30 April 1933 – 2 July 2026) was a Scottish Conservative Party politician and a life peer. He was a member of the House of Lords from 1985 until his retirement in 2018.

== Life and career ==
Sanderson was born in Melrose, Scottish Borders on 30 April 1933. He was educated at St. Mary's School, Melrose, Glenalmond College, Bradford Technical College and the Scottish Textile College.

Sanderson was Knighted in the 1981 New Year Honours for political and public service in Scotland. He was created a life peer on 5 June 1985 as Baron Sanderson of Bowden, of Melrose in the District of Ettrick and Lauderdale and spoke regularly in the House of Lords. Bowden in his title is taken from a village in the Roxburghshire area of the Scottish Borders.

From 1987 to 1990 Lord Sanderson was a Minister of State in the Scottish Office, responsible for housing, agriculture and fisheries. He also served as Chairman of the Conservative Party in Scotland in the early 1990s, and was seen as responsible for removing Michael Forsyth from the Scottish Office and other right-wingers from the Party's Central Office in Scotland.

In 2010 he was appointed to lead a review into the future of the Conservative Party in Scotland. This followed the 2010 general election, where despite winning a plurality of seats in the House of Commons, the Conservatives won only one constituency in Scotland. Lord Sanderson's report recommended an overhaul of leadership, with a separately elected leader to take full responsibility for the party's performance in Scotland. A formal response from the party was expected in early 2011.

Sanderson retired from the House of Lords on 29 March 2018. He died on 2 July 2026, aged 93.

== Arms ==
Coat of arms of Russell Sanderson, Baron Sanderson of Bowden
Adopted 2008 Crest A Cock Or armed crested and wattled Sable supporting in the dexter claw a Buckle of the first Escutcheon Per pale dexter bendy Sable and Or sinister Azure a Chevron per pale Azure and Or in dexter chief a Ram's Head affrontée Argent horned Gules in sinister chief a Fleur-de-lys issuant from a Crescent Argent Supporters Dexter: a Connemara Pony proper; Sinister: a Cashmere Goat proper Motto PERSEVERE

== Sources ==
- https://web.archive.org/web/20110527052725/http://www.dodonline.co.uk/engine.asp?lev1=4&lev2=38&menu=70&biog=y&id=26549&group=5&Page=Lord%20Sanderson%20of%20Bowden%20%3A%20Political%20Biography
- https://publications.parliament.uk/pa/ld199798/ldjournal/231/026.htm
