= Julian Fulton =

American singer-songwriter

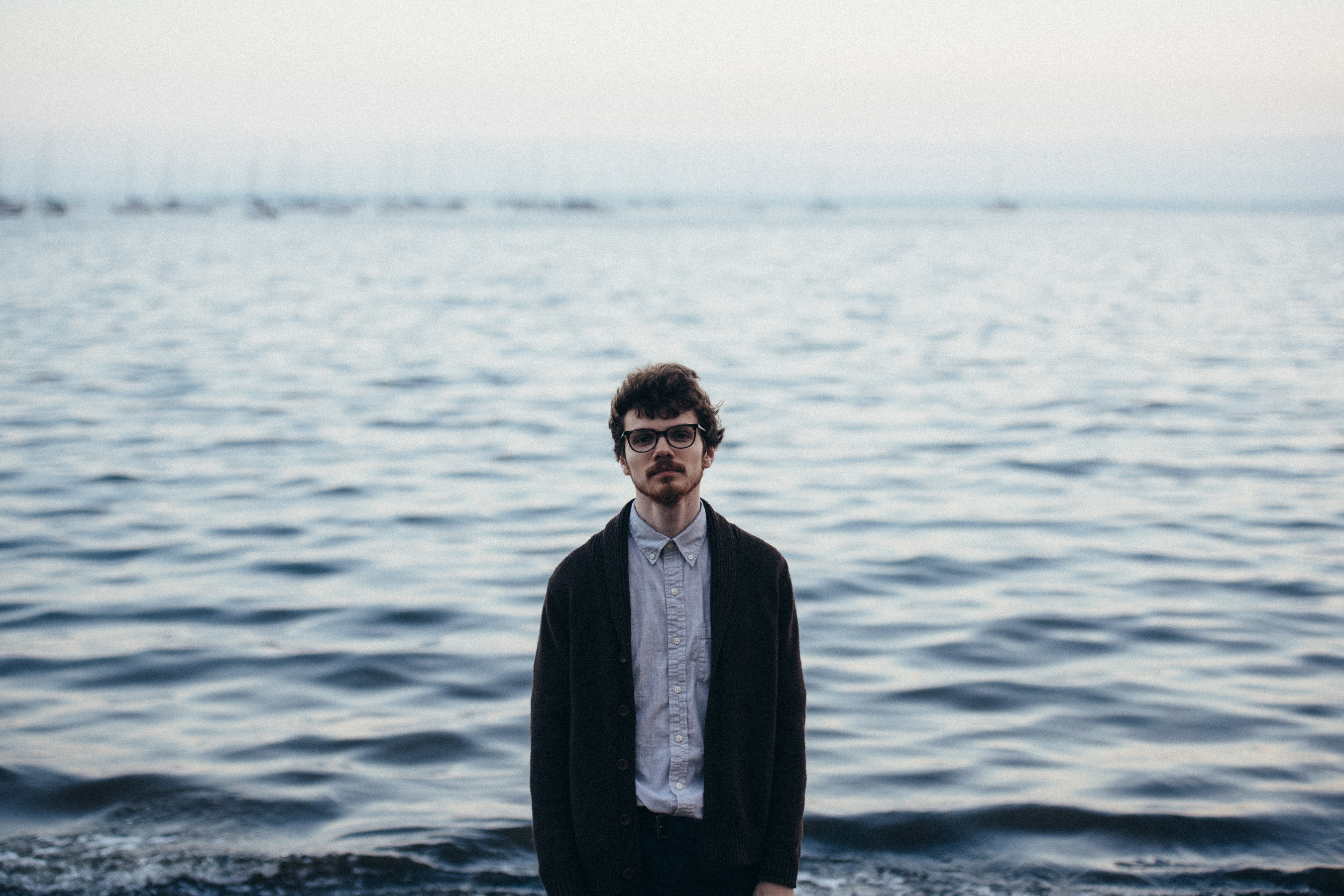

Background information
- Born: New Jersey
- Genres: indie rock, indie pop, psych pop, acid folk, soul, blues, alternative, psych pop, indie folk, psych rock, bedroom pop, singer-songwriter, folk
- Years active: 2010s–present
- Labels: unsigned
- Website: https://julianfulton.com

Julian Fulton is an American songwriter and multi-instrumentalist from New Jersey. He is known for incorporating multiple musical styles into a unique brand of indie rock. When performing or recording with a full band, Fulton and fellow musicians are known as Julian Fulton and the Zombie Gospel. Fulton has been compared to acts like The Beatles, Beck, Grizzly Bear (band), Wilco, The Beach Boys, Tame Impala, and many others.

== Early life ==
Fulton was born and raised in New Jersey. He grew up in a big family, and has been writing music and playing instruments since he was a kid.

Around the age of 12, Fulton got really into music after rediscovering his parents’ albums, most of which were from the 1960s and 1970s. He grew up on acts such as The Beatles, Stevie Wonder, and Neil Young.

In high school, Fulton was awarded a Basie Award, an annual Monmouth County-based high school theater award presented by Count Basie Theatre, by comedian Lewis Black for "Best Lead Actor in a Drama."

== Music ==
Fulton began performing original music at the age of 17. He's been backed up by his brother Aidan Fulton (drums) and girlfriend Kristine Donovan (vocals) on-and-off since high school.

Fulton and friends first performed as Julian Fulton and the Zombie Gospel at The Bamboozle Festival in April 2011. Julian Fulton and the Zombie Gospel released their debut EP Heart & Arms in 2012.

The (at one point) nine-person backing band dwindled down to a core group of players: Aidan Fulton on drums, Russ Eia (who joined the band in 2012) on bass, and Kristine Donovan on vocals. The four-piece released the single "Two Little Thieves" in 2013.

The Zombie Gospel "fizzled out" in summer of 2014 when members left to pursue school and job opportunities. The hiatus of Julian Fulton and the Zombie Gospel led to Fulton releasing the DIY singles "Paris, Idaho" and "Another Tattoo," two home-recorded EPs (Reverie and Noise), and playing his first ever solo shows in 2015.

In August 2016, Fulton began gigging once again with a new manifestation of The Zombie Gospel. He continues to play with and without the backing band.

On April 10, 2017, Fulton premiered "Howl," the first single off his EP Battered Receptions, via Atwood Magazine and announced that Battered Receptions was to be released on May 12, 2017. On May 3, Fulton premiered "Rosie's Disposition," the second song off of Battered Receptions, via The Wild Honey Pie. On May 12, 2017, Fulton self-released the EP Battered Receptions, which streamed in full a day earlier via GoldFlakePaint.

== Discography ==
=== LP's ===
- none

=== EP's ===
- Battered Receptions (2017); self-released
- Noise (2015); self-released
- Reverie (2015); self-released
- Heart & Arms [as Julian Fulton and the Zombie Gospel] (2012); self-released

=== Singles ===
- "I Have Never Loved Another" (2019); self-released
- "Another Tattoo" (2015); self-released
- "Paris, Idaho" (2014); self-released
- "Two Little Thieves" [as Julian Fulton and the Zombie Gospel] (2013); self-released
