= Thomas Fulton (ironmaster) =

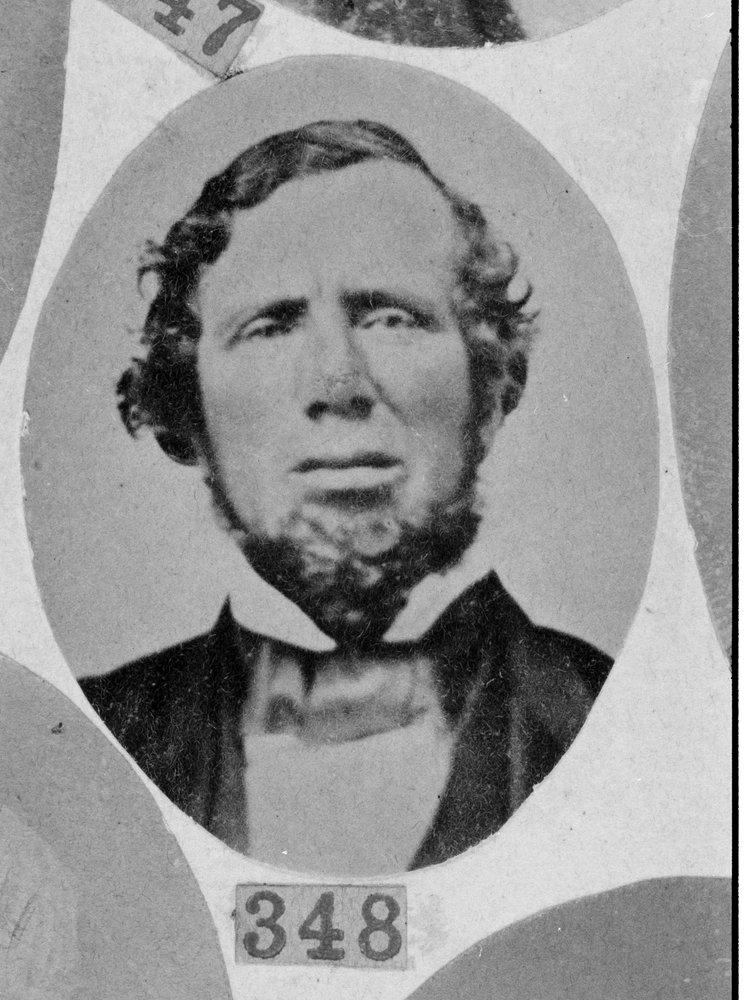
- Thomas Fulton in 1872
- Born: 8 October 1813; Dundee, Scotland
- Died: 18 February 1859 (aged 45); Bendigo, Victoria
- Occupation: Iron founder
- Spouse(s): Elizabeth, née Black
- Children: eight children

Thomas Fulton (1813–1859) was an iron foundry owner in Melbourne, Australia. He established one of the earliest foundries and engineering works in Melbourne in 1842 with Robert Langlands and laid the basis for the metal industry in the colony of Victoria.

== Early life ==
Fulton was born at Dundee, Scotland, to a wrought-iron worker, Thomas Fulton (d.1866), and Isabella, née Wheelwright. He was apprenticed to a machine-maker but migrated in February 1842 to Port Phillip in partnership with Robert Langlands, whose brothers George and Henry had previously come to the colony to start a metal works.

== Foundry business ==
Langlands and Fulton established their iron foundry in Flinders Streetwith in 1842 with only a small foot-lathe, but were still able to erect a steam engine for the first flour mill in Melbourne. They produced rack woolpresses for squatters, with Fulton having to cut screw threads by hand because their lathe was too small. Fulton developed a technique for boiling down sheep for tallow around 1843–44 when squatters slaughtered their otherwise worthless sheep in the thousands due to a rural depression. Fulton was located at 131 Flinders St West in about 1844 and entered partnership with George Annand and Robert Smith at 129 Flinders St West, between 1846 and 1855, employing 150 men in 1858. The gold rush proved a boon, and the firm increased output of plumbing and smithy work and dray wheels. They were also milling flour and operating as a licensed insurance agent and merchant.

Fulton and Smith won a prize at the Melbourne Exhibition in 1854 for their flour, which was produced on machinery they built for the Campbellfield Steam Mills, for which they also won a medal at the exhibition.).

== Personal and public life ==
Fulton was a dedicated Christian, having been introduced to the Congregational Church in Scotland by Dr David Russell. He was the first deacon of the Congregational Church in Victoria, and funded both the Lonsdale Street and St Kilda churches as well as helping to bring ministers from Scotland with donations of up to £5000. He attended a Congregational church conference in Hobart in 1858. Fulton was evidently well liked by his workers, who presented him with a silver server in 1858. He became a Melbourne city councillor in 1854–59 and a magistrate and was a strong advocate for temperance, for separation of the colony from New South Wales and abolition of convict transportation. He was a popular speaker with a 'homely and racy eloquence', but while he stood for parliament he was defeated. He was also a founder of a land syndicate that invested in the Malvern and Gardiner areas.

Garryowen described him as "...the sort of man for an infant settlement; skilful, and industrious, strong of mind, iron in frame, outspoken, and honest to the backbone."

Fulton died on 18 February 1859 when he fell down a Bendigo mine-shaft while checking one of his machinery installations. His headstone was erected by his employees. His brothers William (1825–1879) a joiner and patternmaker, James a timber merchant, and Robert, inherited his estate. Robert continued to operate the foundry.
