= George Fulton (disambiguation) =

George Fulton (born 1977) is a British-Pakistani television journalist.

George Fulton may also refer to:

- George Edward Fulton (1855–1895), Australian engineer and foundry owner
- George N. Fulton (1834–1894), noted stoneware potter in Virginia
