= Charles Fulton =

Charles Fulton may refer to:

- Charles W. Fulton (1853–1918), United States senator from Oregon
- Charles J. Fulton (1860–1937), American state legislator from Iowa
- Charles William Thomas Fulton (1906–1988), Australian architect
- Charles B. Fulton (1910–1996), United States federal judge from Florida
- Charles Fulton (minister) (1938–2022), American minister who started YouthQuake
- Charlie Fulton (Canadian football) (Charles Fulton, born 1947), American player of Canadian football

== See also ==
- Charlie Fulton (wrestler) (1949–2016), American professional wrestler
