= Alexander Fulton =

American activist (1805–1885)

Alexander Fulton (August 29, 1805 – January 17, 1885) was the founder of the Iowa State Agricultural Society.

Fulton was born in Huntingdon County, Pennsylvania, to James and Ann Fulton. He was their fourth child. In 1807, the Fulton family moved to Baltimore, Maryland, and in 1814 to Ross County, Ohio.

In 1822, Fulton joined the Methodist Episcopal Church. On June 22, 1826, he married Eliza Jones. Shortly after, they moved to Delaware County, Ohio, where they had five children: Robert J. (1829–1857), Gilbert Lafayette (1831–1853), Joseph Warren (1833–1903), William C. (1836–1857), and Martha Amelia (1838–1855). During this time, Fulton worked as a millwright.

In 1843, the family moved to Fairfield, Jefferson County, in the Iowa Territory. On May 29 of that year, Fulton purchased 40 acres (0.2 km²) of land from the government and built a log cabin in the northeast quarter of the southwest quarter of section 26, township 72, R 10 W. On December 8, 1845, he purchased another 40 acres (0.2 km²) of land, in section 10 of township 71; and on October 15, 1846, another 40 acres (0.2 km²), in section 34 of township 71.

While in Fairfield, Fulton was the proprietor of the first drug and book store in the area. He also organized and was the first member of the Jefferson Lodge No. 4, a branch of the Independent Order of Odd Fellows. He and Eliza were also foster parents. One of their many foster children took the name Morris Fulton. Fulton is said to have had a "celebrated truck garden".

Fulton was one of the founders of the Iowa State Agricultural Society. This organization was a forerunner of the Iowa State Fair.

Fulton represented Iowa Governor Cyrus C. Carpenter at the United States Centennial celebration in Philadelphia, Pennsylvania, in 1876.

He died in his Fairfield home on January 17, 1885. His tombstone is number 492 in lot 52 of the Old Fairfield City Cemetery.
