= Otho Fulton =

American inventor (1868–1938)

Dr. Otho Fulton (1868–1938) was an American inventor with a number of inventions in facsimile transmissions, including the fultograph. He sent a picture across a radio channel from London to Sydney. He was also a director of the British General Electric Company, and served in the Boer War and World War I as a captain in the British Army. He was also a friend of Robert Baden-Powell and was the third appointed member of The Scout Association.

Fulton died of a heart attack at the age of 70.
