= Charlie Fulton (Canadian football) =

American football quarterback

No. 12
- Positions: Quarterback, Halfback

Personal information
- Born: 1947 (age 78–79)
- Listed height: 5 ft 11 in (1.80 m)
- Listed weight: 180 lb (82 kg)

Career information
- College: Tennessee (1964–1967)
- NFL draft: 1968: 16th round, 413th overall pick

Career history
- 1968–1969: Edmonton Eskimos

Awards and highlights
- National champion (1967); Second-team All-SEC (1966)

Charles Fulton (born 1947) is an American former professional football quarterback who played two seasons with the Edmonton Eskimos of the Canadian Football League (CFL). He was selected by the Boston Patriots in the sixteenth round of the 1968 NFL draft after playing college football at the University of Tennessee.

== Early life ==
Charles Fulton was born in 1947. He attended Whitehaven High School in Memphis, Tennessee. According to The Commercial Appeal, he received 20 scholarship offers from major colleges.

== College career ==
Fulton was a member of the Tennessee Volunteers of the University of Tennessee from 1964 to 1967 and a three-year letterman from 1965 to 1967. He opened the 1965 season as the team's starting quarterback. He rushed 118 times for 298 yards and two touchdowns in 1965 while also completing 29 of 59 passes (49.2%) for 425 yards, four touchdowns, and five interceptions. In 1966, he totaled 109 carries for 463 yards and two touchdowns, 10 receptions for 102 yards, and two completions on six passing attempts for 46 yards and one interception. The Associated Press named Fulton second-team All-SEC as a running back for the 1966 season. As a senior in 1967, Fulton recorded 69 rushing attempts for 328 yards and two touchdowns, four catches for 20 yards, and 12 completions on 19 passing attempts (63.2%) for 177 yards. The 1967 Volunteers were recognized as national champions by Litkenhous.

== Professional career ==
Fulton was selected by the Boston Patriots in the 16th round, with the 413th overall pick, of the 1968 NFL/AFL draft but did not sign with them.

To Charlie Fulton

He's only just a little guy
In courage there's no lack,
He's on the lips of everyone
Our brand new quarterback.
He came unheralded, unsung
Credentials he was lacking
He'd never led a pro team
In the job of quarterbacking.
But now with two games under his belt
He's got our spirits up,
We hope ere long if Fortune smiles
To see the old Grey Cup.

— Norman L. Ibsen, Edmonton Journal, September 13, 1968.

He instead signed with the Edmonton Eskimos of the Canadian Football League in 1968. On September 13, 1968, the Edmonton Journal reported that Fulton had "taken a stranglehold" on the starting quarterback job after leading the Eskimos to two upset victories against the Calgary Stampeders and Ottawa Rough Riders in his first two professional starts. Overall, he played in all 16 games for the Eskimos during the 1968 season, completing 52 of 119 passes (43.7%) for 729 yards, one touchdown, and seven interceptions while rushing 66 times for 297 yards and two touchdowns. He also caught five passes for 48 yards, returned two kicks for 37 yards, and fumbled three times, losing one of them. Six of his interceptions were thrown against the Rough Riders on September 27 in a rainy game. The Eskimos finished the season with an 8–7–1 record and lost in the Western semifinal to the Calgary Stampeders. Fulton appeared in 14 games during the 1969 season, totaling 47 completions on 104 passing attempts (45.2%) for 611 yards, one touchdown, and 12 interceptions, 25 carries for 151 yards, three receptions for 22 yards, and two lost fumbles. The Eskimos finished the year with a 5–11 record. He also spent time at defensive back in 1969. He was released on July 27, 1970.
