= Conservatism (disambiguation) =

Conservatism is a set of political philosophies that favour tradition.

Conservatism or conservative may also refer to:

- Linguistic conservatism, a language form that has changed relatively little over its history
- Conservatism (belief revision), a cognitive bias in Bayesian belief revision
- Conservative interval, a confidence interval whose actual coverage probability is greater than a desired nominal coverage probability
- Conservatism (diving), a risk averse approach to decompression practice
- Convention of conservatism, a policy in accounting of anticipating possible future losses but not future gains
- Epistemic conservatism, a view about the structure of reasons or justification for belief
- Conservative force, a physical force whose work is path-independent
- Conservative vector field, a vector field that is the gradient of some function
- The Conservative, an American weekly journal published from 1898 to 1902
- Conservatism: An Invitation to the Great Tradition, a 2017 book by Roger Scruton

== See also ==
- Conservative Christianity
- Conservative movement (disambiguation)
- Conservative Party
- List of conservative parties by country
- Conservation (disambiguation)
- Conserve (disambiguation)
- Progressive Conservative (disambiguation)
- Conservative Judaism, a branch of Judaism that began in the early 1900s
- Conservative Friends, members of a certain branch of the Religious Society of Friends (Quakers)
- Traditionalist conservatism, a political philosophy emphasizing the need for the principles of natural law and transcendent moral order
- National conservatism, a variant of conservatism which concentrates more on national interests and traditional social/ethical views
- Centre-right politics
