= Conservative Party =

The Conservative Party is a name used by many political parties around the world. These political parties are generally right-wing, though their exact ideologies can range from centre-right to far-right.

Political parties by this name include:

== Europe ==
=== Current ===
- Conservative Party (Czech Republic)
- Conservative People's Party (Denmark)
- Conservative Party of Georgia
- Conservative Party (Norway)
- Conservative Party (UK)

=== Historical ===
- Tories, Britain and Ireland 1678–1834; the roots of the Conservative Party (UK)
- Conservative Party (Bulgaria), 1879–1884
- Conservative Party (Kingdom of Serbia), 1861-1895
- German Conservative Party, 1876–1918
- Conservative Party (Hungary), 1846–1849
- Conservative Party (Iceland), 1924–1927
- Conservative Party (Prussia), 1848–1876
- Vlad Țepeș League, in Romania 1929–1938
- Conservative Party (Romania, 1880–1918)
- Conservative Party (Romania), 1991–2015
- Conservative Party (Spain), 1876–1931
- Conservative Party (Sweden), 1995–1999
- Croatian Conservative Party, 2014–2019
- The Conservatives (Latvia), 2022–2023

== Africa ==
- Conservative Party (Egypt)
- Conservative Party (Kenya)
- Conservative Party (South Africa)
- Conservative Party (Uganda)

== Americas ==
=== Canada ===
==== Current ====
- Conservative Party of Canada (founded 2003)

==== Historical ====
- Conservative Labour (1872–1875)
- Conservative Party of Canada (1867–1942)
- Liberal-Conservative Party, name until 1873 and 1922–1938
- National Liberal and Conservative Party, 1920–1921
- Nationalist Conservative (date?)
- Progressive Conservative Party (disambiguation)

=== United States ===
- Conservative Party (United States)
- New Jersey Conservative Party
- Conservative Party of New York State
- Conservative Party (South Carolina)
- Conservative Party of Virginia (1867)
- Conservative Party of Virginia (1965)

=== Others ===
- Conservative Party (Bolivia)
- Conservative Party (Brazil)
- Conservative Party (Chile), 1836–1948
- United Conservative Party (Chile), 1953–1966
- Colombian Conservative Party
- Conservative Party (Ecuador)
- Conservative Party (Guatemala), c. 1830–1920
- Conservative Party (Mexico), 1849–1867
- Conservative Party (Nicaragua)
- Conservative Party (Panama)
- Conservative Party (Venezuela)

== Asia ==
=== Japan ===
- Conservative Party of Japan (founded 2023)
- New Conservative Party (Japan), 2000–2003

=== Others ===
- Democratic Conservative Party (Syria), also simply known as the "Conservative Party"
- Conservative Party (Hong Kong)

== Oceania ==
=== Australia ===
- Australian Conservatives

=== New Zealand ===
- Conservative Party NZ
- New Zealand Conservative Party
- New Zealand National Party

== See also ==
- The dictionary definition of Conservative Party at Wiktionary
- Conservatism (disambiguation)
- Conservative Alliance (disambiguation)
- Conservative Christianity
- Conservative Democratic Party (disambiguation)
- Conservative government, a list of Canadian and British Conservative governments
- Conservative Party leadership election (disambiguation)
- Conservative People's Party (disambiguation)
- Leader of the Conservative Party (disambiguation)
- List of conservative parties by country
- List of Conservative Party politicians
- New Conservative Party (disambiguation)
- Conservative Catholics (Italy)
- Conservative Nationalist Party
- Conservative Party Archive
- Conservative Party Review (2016)
- The Conservative (1898-1902), a weekly newspaper in Nebraska
- The Conservative (journal)
