= Conversation (disambiguation) =

Conversation is communication among people.

Conversation(s) or The Conversation may also refer to:

== Film and television ==
- The Conversation, a 1974 psychological thriller film
- Conversations, a 1995 film starring Meta Golding
- The Conversation (TV series), a 2020 American reality series
- "The Conversation" (Billions), a 2016 television episode
- "The Conversation" (Mad About You), a 1997 television episode

== Literature ==
- Conversation (magazine), a UK poetry magazine
- A Conversation, a 2001 play by David Williamson

== Music ==
=== Albums ===
- Conversation (album), by the Twinz, 1995
- Conversation, by Conte Candoli, 1973
- Conversations (Archie Shepp and Kahil El'Zabar album), 1999
- Conversations (Buddy Rich, Louie Bellson and Kenny Clare album), 1972
- Conversations (Eric Dolphy album), 1963
- Conversations (From a Second Story Window album), 2008
- Conversations (Roses Are Red album) or the title song, 2004
- Conversations (Sara Groves album) or the title song, 2001
- Conversations (Woman's Hour album) or the title song, 2014
- Conversations (Gentleman and Ky-Mani Marley album)
- Conversations I, by Roscoe Mitchell, 2014
- Conversations II, by Roscoe Mitchell, 2014
- Conversations, by Brass Construction, 1983
- Conversations, by Alain Trudel and Yannick Nézet-Séguin, 2003
- The Conversation (Texas album) or the title song (see below), 2013
- The Conversation (Tim Finn album), 2008
- The Conversation, by Cabaret Voltaire, 1994
- Conversations (Budjerah EP), by the Budjerah, 2022

=== Songs ===
- "Conversation", by Catfish and the Bottlemen from The Balance, 2019
- "Conversation", by Gary Numan from The Pleasure Principle, 1979
- "Conversation", by Joni Mitchell from Ladies of the Canyon, 1970
- "Conversation", by Morris Albert, 1977
- "Conversation", by Sabina Ddumba, 2019
- "Conversation", by Twice from Taste of Love, 2021
- "Conversations" (song), by Juice Wrld, 2020
- "Conversations", by Cilla Black, 1969
- "The Conversation" (Waylon Jennings and Hank Williams Jr. song), 1983
- "The Conversation" (Texas song), 2013
- "The Conversation", by Ivy from All Hours, 2011

== News and radio ==
- Conversations (radio program), an Australian interview program
- Conversations Network, a podcast network 2002–2012
- The Conversation (website), a not-for-profit news and research site

== Tech and computing ==
- Convoz, a social networking app
- Conversations (software), an XMPP client for Android

== Other uses ==
- The Conversation (Matisse), a 1909 painting by Henri Matisse
- Criminal conversation, a historical common law tort arising from adultery
- Richard Sharp (politician) (1759–1835), also known as "Conversation" Sharp, Whig intellectual

== See also ==
- Conservation (disambiguation)
- Debate (disambiguation)
