= Leader of the Conservative Party =

The title Leader of the Conservative Party may refer to:

- Leader of the Conservative Party (UK)
- Leader of the Conservative Party of Canada
- Leader of the Conservative Party NZ
- Leader of the Conservative Party of Norway

== See also ==
- Conservative Party (disambiguation)
- Conservative Party leadership election (disambiguation)
- Deputy Leader of the Conservative Party (UK)
