= List of Conservative Party politicians =

The following articles list politicians from various conservative parties:

== Canada ==
- List of Canadian conservative leaders

== European Union ==
- List of European Conservatives and Reformists members of the European Parliament

== United Kingdom ==
- Leader of the Conservative Party (UK)
- Deputy Leader of the Conservative Party (UK)
- Chief Whip of the Conservative Party
- List of Conservative Party (UK) MPs
  - List of Conservative Party Members of Parliament in London
  - List of United Kingdom Conservative MPs (2005–10)
  - List of United Kingdom Conservative MPs (2010–15)
- Category:Conservative Party (UK) politicians

== See also ==
- Conservative Party (disambiguation)
- European Conservatives and Reformists
