= Conservation Authority =

Conservation Authority may refer to:

- Conservation authority (Ontario, Canada), a local natural resource management agency
- New Zealand Conservation Authority, an advisory body to the New Zealand Department of Conservation
- Energy Efficiency and Conservation Authority, a New Zealand government/Crown agency responsible for promoting energy efficiency and conservation

== See also ==
- Conservation Authorities Act, Ontario Provincial act to ensure the conservation, restoration and responsible management of hydrological features
- Conservation (disambiguation)
