= Conservative Democratic Party =

Conservative Democratic Party may refer to:

- Conservative-Democratic Party, a political party in Romania
- Conservative Democratic Party (Greece)
- Conservative Democratic Party (Slovakia)
- Conservative Democratic Party of Switzerland

== See also ==
- Conservative democracy, Turkish political term
- Conservative Party
- Democratic Party
