= Liz Truss as Leader of the Conservative Party =

Leader of the Conservative Party for 2022

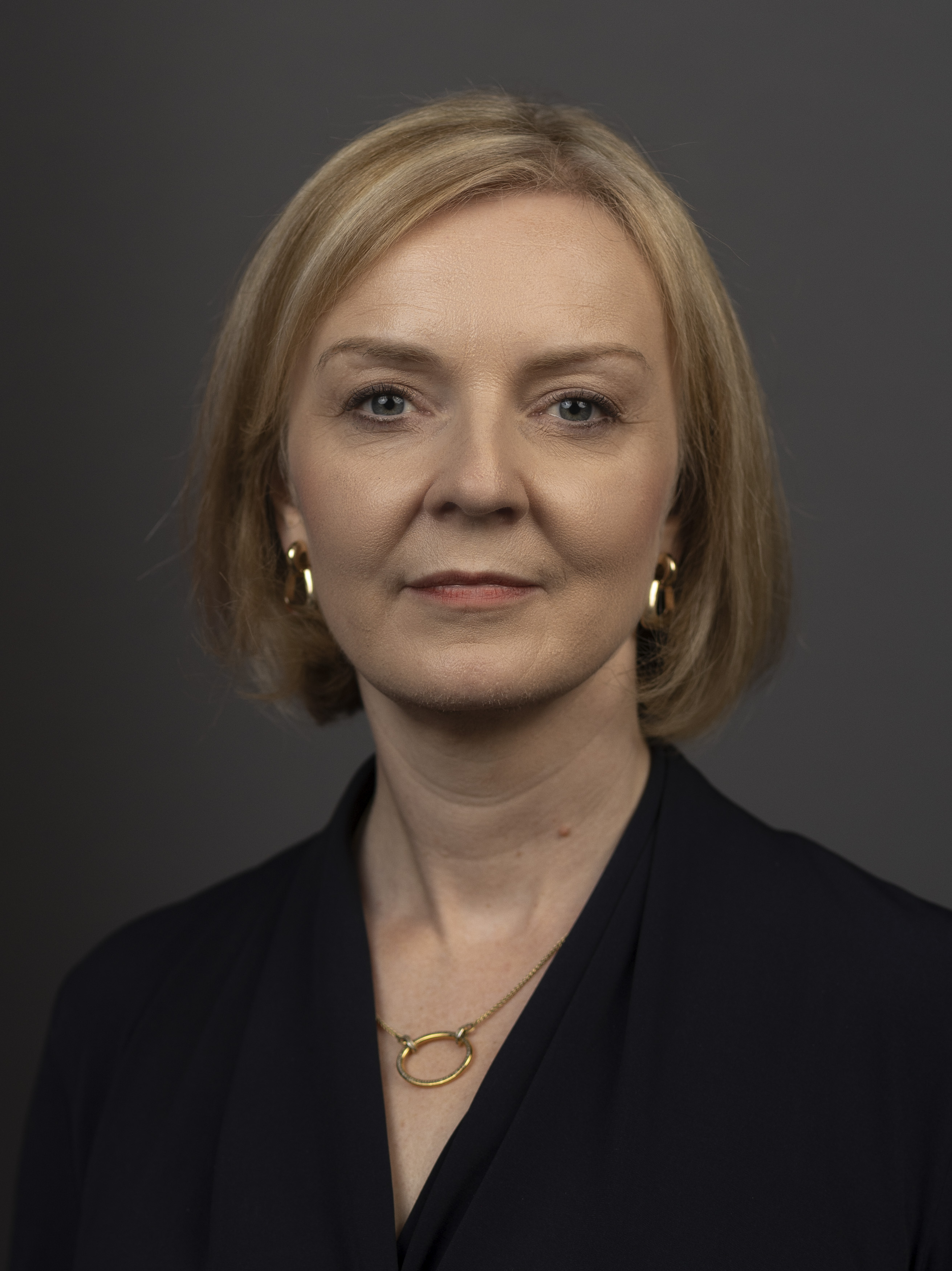
- Official portrait, 2022
- Liz Truss as Leader of the Conservative Party; 6 September 2022 – 25 October 2022
- Cabinet: Truss ministry
- Party: Conservative
- Election: Leadership; 2022
- Appointed by: Elizabeth II and Charles III (Note: Only as prime minister)

Liz Truss was elected as Leader of the Conservative Party in September 2022, following Boris Johnson's resignation amid the political crisis surrounding his government.

== Term (2022) ==
=== Cabinet and death of Elizabeth II ===
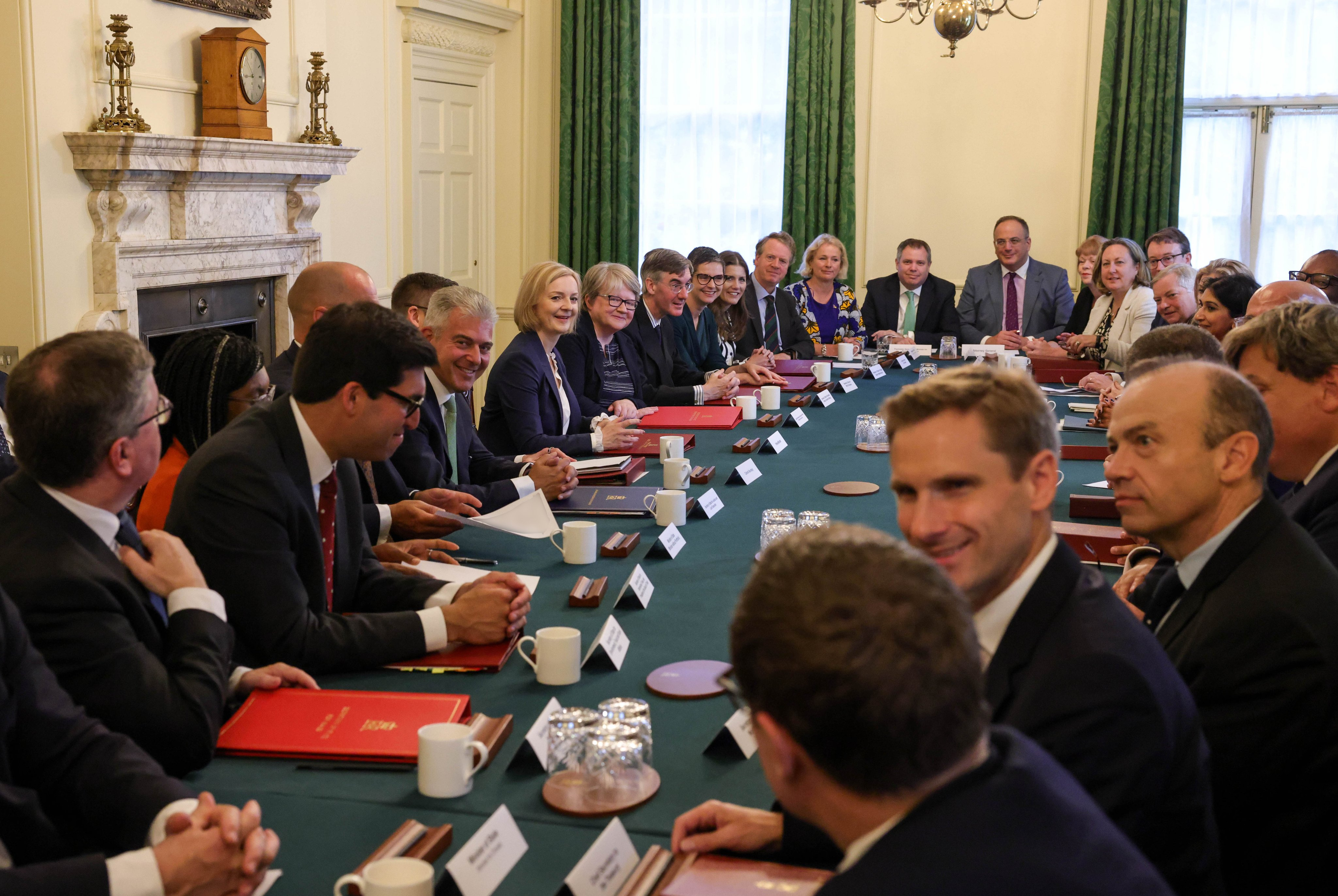
Truss chairing the first meeting of her cabinet

As the leader of the Conservative Party, the majority party in the House of Commons, Truss was appointed as prime minister by Elizabeth II at Balmoral Castle on 6 September 2022 and began to select her cabinet ministers.

With the appointment of Kwarteng as chancellor of the Exchequer, James Cleverly as foreign secretary and Suella Braverman as home secretary, for the first time in British history, no white men held any of the Great Offices of State. Other appointments included Thérèse Coffey as deputy prime minister and health secretary, Jacob Rees-Mogg as business secretary, Kemi Badenoch as international trade secretary, Kit Malthouse as education secretary, Penny Mordaunt as leader of the House of Commons and Michelle Donelan as culture secretary. Truss retained Ben Wallace as defence secretary, Alok Sharma as president for COP26, Alister Jack as Scotland secretary, Robert Buckland as Wales secretary and James Heappey as minister of state for the armed forces and veterans. Her cabinet was composed almost entirely of those who had supported her during the leadership contest.

Truss was the fifteenth and final British prime minister to serve under Elizabeth II, who died on 8 September, two days after appointing Truss. She was told in the early morning that the Queen was unwell and likely to survive a "matter of hours, not days"; Truss ordered black clothes from her Greenwich home in anticipation of the Queen's death, as she had not yet had time to move her belongings to Westminster. Upon Elizabeth's death, Truss delivered a statement outside 10 Downing Street paying tribute to her:

Queen Elizabeth II was the rock on which modern Britain was built. Our country has grown and flourished under her reign. Britain is the great country it is today because of her. ... Through thick and thin, Queen Elizabeth II provided us with the stability and the strength that we needed. She was the very spirit of Great Britain, and that spirit will endure.

On 10 September Truss attended Charles III's accession ceremony and took an oath of allegiance to the King with fellow senior MPs. On 19 September she attended the Queen's funeral service in Westminster Abbey, reading the second lesson.

=== Domestic policies and mini-budget ===
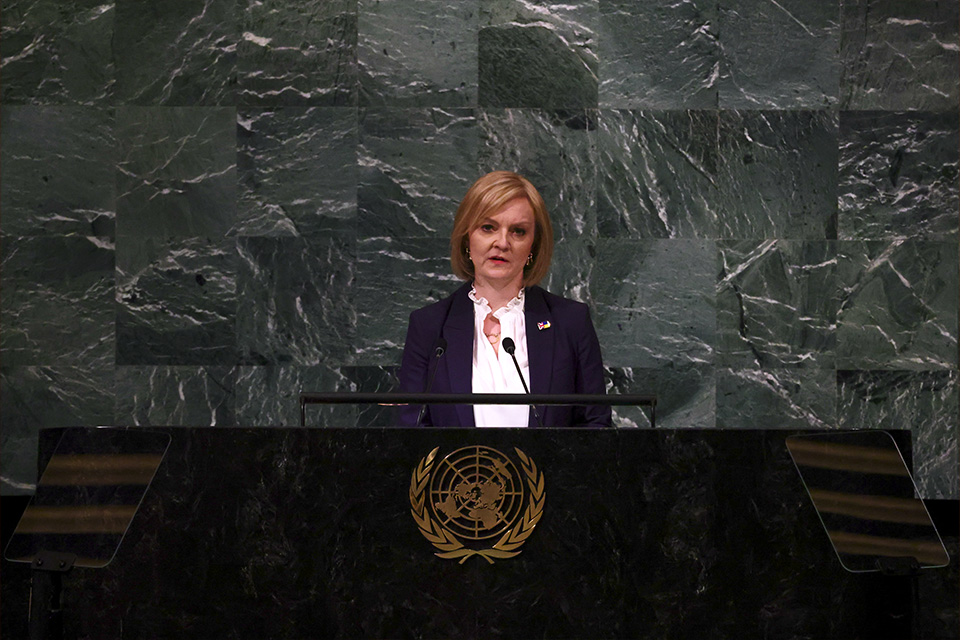
Truss spoke at the UN General Assembly in September 2022.

On 8 September, in response to the ongoing cost of living crisis, Truss announced the Energy Price Guarantee, which was planned to cap average household energy bills at £2,500 per year, costing between 31 and £140 billion for the two years it covered. Truss, who announced the measure in the House of Commons, made an effort to keep the energy cap and the tax plan announcements – which the Chancellor was planned to unveil – separate.

On 23 September, Kwarteng announced a controversial mini-budget which proposed cutting taxation significantly, including abolishing the 45 per cent rate of income tax and the proposed Health and Social Care Levy, cutting stamp duty and the basic rate of income tax and cancelling rises in National Insurance contributions and corporation tax; the package, which had been constructed by Truss and Kwarteng together, was to be funded by borrowing and was intended to stimulate economic growth. The mini-budget was received badly by financial markets because it included temporary spending measures whilst permanently cutting tax rates. It was blamed for the pound falling to its lowest ever rate against the US dollar (US$1.033) and prompted a response from the Bank of England which, amongst other measures, bought up government bonds; the public reaction was also broadly negative. The mini-budget was criticised by the International Monetary Fund, the American president, Joe Biden, the Labour Party and many within Truss's party, including the senior politicians Michael Gove and Grant Shapps. The government bonds, bought for £19.3 billion, were sold over the following sixteen months for £23.1 billion, yielding a net profit of £3.8bn for HM Treasury.

=== Government crisis and resignation ===
I think it's a shambles and a disgrace ... I hope all those people that put Liz Truss in Number 10, I hope it was worth it. I hope it was worth it for the ministerial red box, I hope it was worth it to sit round the Cabinet table because the damage they have done to our party is extraordinary.

— Charles Walker's remarks on the market fallout, subsequent government crisis and Conservative unpopularity.

After initially defending the mini-budget, on 3 October Truss instructed Kwarteng to reverse the abolition of the 45 per cent income tax additional rate. She later reversed the cut in corporation tax and dismissed Kwarteng, replacing him with Jeremy Hunt on 14 October. Hunt reversed many of the remaining policies announced in the mini-budget, leading to further instability; because of Truss's perceived weakness, he was described by some Conservative MPs and newspapers as the de facto prime minister. During this time, Truss became increasingly unpopular with the public, and contributed to a large fall in support for the Conservatives; in October, she became the most unpopular prime minister in British history, with her personal approval rating recorded in one survey as nine per cent. She was pilloried in national and international press as a u-turner, and a chaotic vote on fracking along with the resignation of Braverman as home secretary compounded a rapid deterioration of confidence in her leadership. On 19 October, in response to a question by the leader of the opposition, Keir Starmer, Truss said that she was a "fighter and not a quitter", quoting a 2001 phrase by Peter Mandelson.

Shortly before noon on 20 October, Truss's forty-fifth day in office, Brady held a meeting with Truss where she asked if she would be able to remain in office; his response was "I don't think so, Prime Minister". At 1:35 pm, Truss announced her resignation as the leader of the Conservative Party and as prime minister. She gave the following 89-second-long statement:

I came into office at a time of great economic and international instability. Families and businesses were worried about how to pay their bills. Putin's illegal war in Ukraine threatens the security of our whole continent. And our country has been held back by for too long by low economic growth. I was elected by the Conservative Party with a mandate to change this. We delivered on energy bills and on cutting National Insurance. And we set out a vision for a low-tax, high-growth economy that would take advantage of the freedoms of Brexit. I recognise though, given the situation, I cannot deliver the mandate on which I was elected by the Conservative Party. I have therefore spoken to His Majesty the King to notify him that I am resigning as leader of the Conservative Party. This morning I met the chairman of the 1922 Committee, Sir Graham Brady. We've agreed there will be a leadership election to be completed within the next week. This will ensure that we remain on a path to deliver our fiscal plans and maintain our country's economic stability and national security. I will remain as prime minister until a successor has been chosen. Thank you.

Heale describes a "funereal atmosphere" within the government in the days following her resignation statement. She was succeeded by Sunak as leader of the Conservative Party on 24 October and the next day advised the King to appoint him as the new prime minister; Sunak went on to further reverse many of the economic measures she had made as prime minister but retained Hunt as chancellor. Resigning on her fiftieth day, Truss became the shortest-serving prime minister in British history, surpassing George Canning, who was prime minister for 119 days in 1827. (Note: Canning's premiership ended with his death, rather than the loss of a general election or by resignation.) The short length of her premiership was the subject of much ridicule, including a livestream of a head of lettuce, started the previous week by the Daily Star tabloid newspaper, which invited viewers to speculate whether Truss would resign before the lettuce wilted.

== Notes and references ==
Notes
