= New Conservative Party =

New Conservative Party (or similar names) may refer to:

- New Conservative Party (UK), 1960–1962
- New Conservative Group, Australia, 1991–c.1992
- New Conservative Party (Japan), 2000–2003
- New Zealand Conservative Party, 1996-c.1998
- New Conservatives Party, New Zealand, 2011–current
- New Conservative Party (Latvia), 2014–current
- New Conservative Party (South Korea), 2019–2020
- New Conservatives (UK), a group of UK Conservative Party MPs, 2023–current

== See also ==
- Conservative Party (disambiguation)
- Neoconservatism
