= Debate (disambiguation) =

A debate is a contention in argument; strife, dissension, quarrelling, controversy; especially a formal discussion of subjects before a public assembly or legislature.

Debate may also refer to:

- Debate (parliamentary procedure)
- Competitive debate, a form of debate between two assigned school teams:
  - Lincoln–Douglas debate format
  - Parliamentary debate
  - Policy debate
  - Public forum debate
  - Australian-Asian debate
- "The Debate" (The West Wing), the seventh episode of the seventh season of the serial political drama
- "The Debate" (Parks and Recreation), the twentieth episode of the fourth season of the comedy television series
- Debate Team (band), an American indie power-pop band and supergroup
- United States presidential election debates

== See also ==
- Conversation (disambiguation)
