= Boris Johnson as Leader of the Conservative Party =

Leader of the Conservative Party from 2019 to 2022

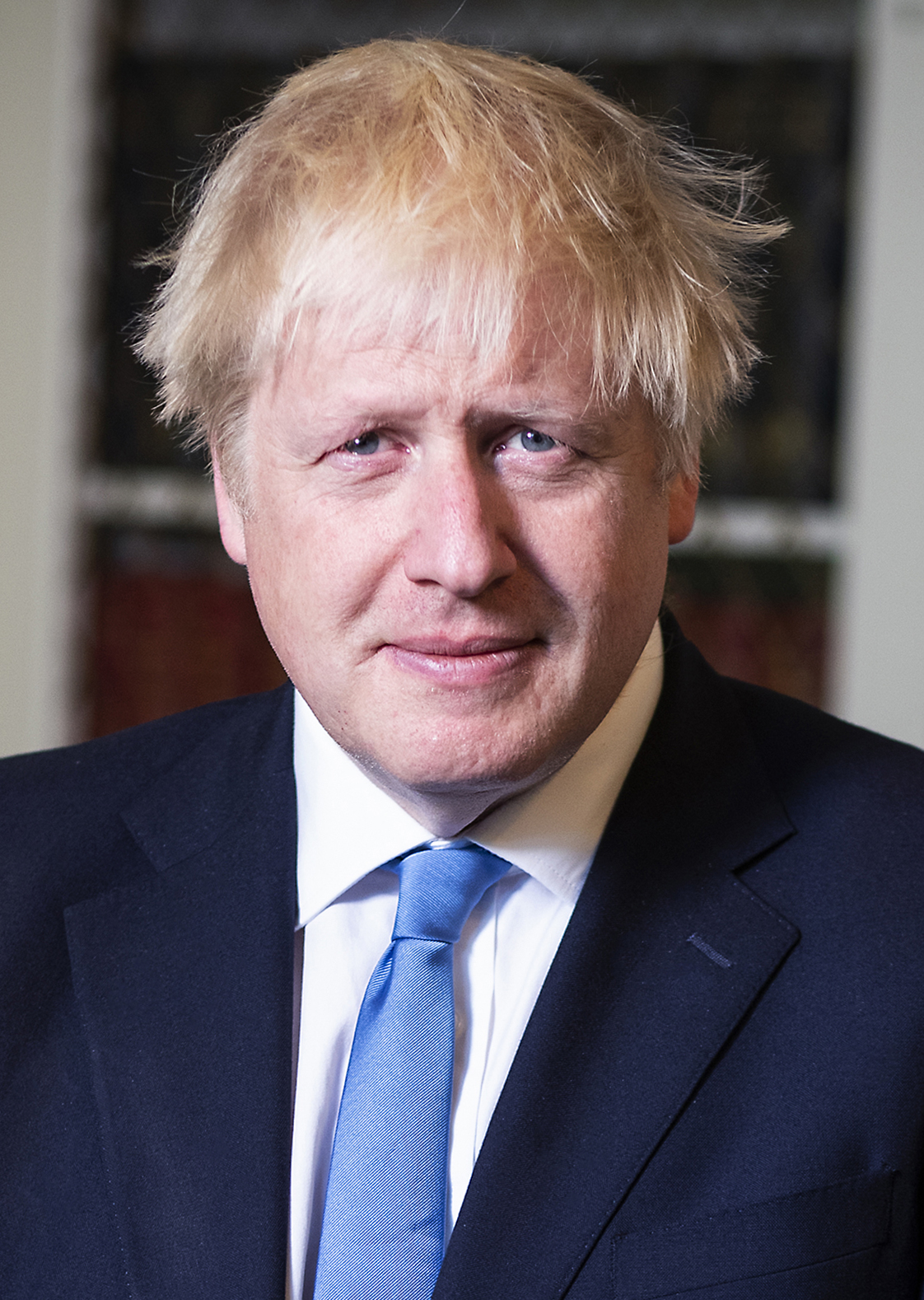
- Official portrait, 2019
- Boris Johnson as Leader of the Conservative Party; 24 July 2019 – 6 September 2022
- Cabinet: First Johnson ministry; Second Johnson ministry
- Party: Conservative
- Election: Leadership; 2019; General; 2019
- Appointed by: Elizabeth II (Note: Only as prime minister)

Boris Johnson was elected as Leader of the Conservative Party in July 2019, following Theresa May's resignation amid the political crisis surrounding her government.

== Term as Prime Minister (2019–2022) ==
Theresa May announced on 24 May 2019 that she would resign as Leader of the Conservative Party and therefore prime minister, after failing three times to secure passage through the House of Commons of her Withdrawal Agreement and Implementation Bill, which would have seen the United Kingdom leave the European Union. Her announcement also followed the Conservative Party's very poor showing in the 2019 European Parliament elections in the UK. Her resignation as Conservative leader took effect on 7 June 2019.

The former London Mayor and Foreign Secretary Boris Johnson was elected to succeed May on 23 July 2019. He was appointed prime minister on the following day by Queen Elizabeth II. Johnson inherited a minority government, supported by a confidence and supply agreement with the Democratic Unionist Party of Northern Ireland.

Johnson appointed his cabinet on 24 July 2019, describing it as a "Cabinet for modern Britain", with The Guardian branding it "an ethnically diverse but ideologically homogeneous statement of intent". While forming his government, Johnson dismissed 11 senior ministers and accepted the resignation of six others, a purge described by Johnson's ally Nigel Evans as "not so much a reshuffle as a summer's day massacre". The mass dismissal was the most extensive Cabinet reorganisation without a change in ruling party in postwar British political history, exceeding the seven Cabinet ministers dismissed in the "Night of the Long Knives" of 1962, and was dubbed the "Night of the Blond Knives" by The Sun.

Among other appointments, Johnson made Dominic Raab the First Secretary of State and Foreign Secretary, and appointed Sajid Javid and Priti Patel as Chancellor of the Exchequer and Home Secretary respectively. Johnson increased the number of ministers attending the Cabinet to 33, four more than had attended the May Cabinet. One quarter of those appointed were women, proportionally less than the May and Cameron ministries. The Cabinet set a new record for ethnic minority representation, with four secretaries of state and two additional ministers coming from minority backgrounds; 17% of the Cabinet were from BAME backgrounds, compared to 14% of the UK population. Nearly two-thirds of those appointed went to fee-paying schools, and almost half had attended Oxford or Cambridge universities. Johnson also created a new ministerial title to be held by himself, Minister for the Union, fulfilling a campaign pledge he had made in the leadership election.

Loss of majority and ministerial resignations

Johnson lost his working majority on 3 September 2019, when Phillip Lee crossed the floor to join the Liberal Democrats. This was reduced further later the same day when 21 Conservative MPs had the whip removed after voting against the Government in order to enable Parliament to take control of the order paper and to debate a back bench bill designed to prevent a no-deal Brexit.

On 5 September 2019, Johnson's brother and Orpington MP Jo Johnson announced his intention to resign both his ministerial position and parliamentary seat, stating "In recent weeks I've been torn between family loyalty and the national interest — it's an unresolvable tension & time for others to take on my roles as MP & Minister." On 7 September 2019, Amber Rudd announced she was resigning as Secretary of State for Work and Pensions and Minister for Women and Equalities, and leaving the Conservative Party.

Amid an impasse in parliament over Brexit, an election was called for 12 December 2019 by virtue of the passage of the Early Parliamentary General Election Act 2019 on 31 October 2019. The Conservatives won a majority, leading to the formation of the second Johnson ministry on 16 December 2019.

=== 2019 to 2020 ===
The Conservative minority first Johnson ministry could not implement its legislative programme due to a political impasse over Brexit. While the Fixed-term Parliaments Act 2011 requires a two-thirds majority vote in parliament to trigger an election, Johnson bypassed this requirement by passing the Early Parliamentary General Election Act 2019. In the resulting election, held on 12 December 2019, Johnson's Conservatives won a majority of eighty seats, the largest for a government led by a Conservative prime minister since Margaret Thatcher in 1987.

Initially the ministers were largely identical to those at the end of the first Johnson ministry, excepting the Secretary of State for Wales, in which position Simon Hart replaced Alun Cairns. Nicky Morgan, who stood down at the general election, and Zac Goldsmith, who lost his seat, were made life peers to allow them to remain in the government.

Johnson reshuffled his cabinet on 13 February 2020: Sajid Javid, Julian Smith, Esther McVey, Geoffrey Cox, Andrea Leadsom, Theresa Villiers and Chris Skidmore all left the government.

Andrew Sabisky worked as a political adviser in Johnson's office for a short time in February. Sabisky, a speaker at the secretly held London Conference on Intelligence at UCL in 2015, believed that there were significant differences in average intelligence between different races, and supported enforced contraception. This caused concern among politicians of all parties in the UK Parliament only a few days after Sabisky's appointment. He resigned from his advisory role on 17 February 2020.

=== 2021 to 2022 ===
The 2021 State Opening of Parliament took place on 11 May 2021. Johnson conducted a cabinet reshuffle on 15 September 2021. The 2022 State Opening of Parliament took place on 10 May 2022. Johnson conducted another cabinet reshuffle on 7 July 2022. In January 2022 researchers at Sussex University maintained Johnson's administration was more corrupt "than any UK government since the Second World War" and feared serious consequences for the UK if it continued. Professor of Anti-Corruption Practice, Robert Barrington, at the Centre for the Study of Corruption at Sussex University stated that Johnson directly influenced this by personal example and by allowing his ministers and staff to do things. Barrington feared "consequences for democracy and Britain's global influence" – Barrington feared further for the economy and national security. Barrington accused MPs or ministers that failed to act against lack of integrity of enabling it. Simon Jenkins wrote "He could never handle rivals near him, and his dismissal of May's abler ministers deprived him, and the UK, of experience and ability in favour of second-rate acolytes."

==== Confidence vote and government crisis ====
On 6 June 2022, Boris Johnson faced a vote of confidence in his ministry. He won the vote, with 211 in favour of his premiership and 148 against. Johnson was politically weakened.

In July 2022, several ministers resigned from the government in response to the handling of the Chris Pincher scandal, including cabinet ministers Sajid Javid, Rishi Sunak and Simon Hart. Michael Gove was sacked for disloyalty.

==== Johnson's resignation ====
Following the resignations, Johnson announced on 7 July 2022 of his decision to step down as Conservative Party leader. Following the completion of the leadership election for his successor on 6 September, he stepped down and was succeeded by Liz Truss.
