= David Cameron as Leader of the Conservative Party =

Leader of the Conservative Party from 2005 to 2016

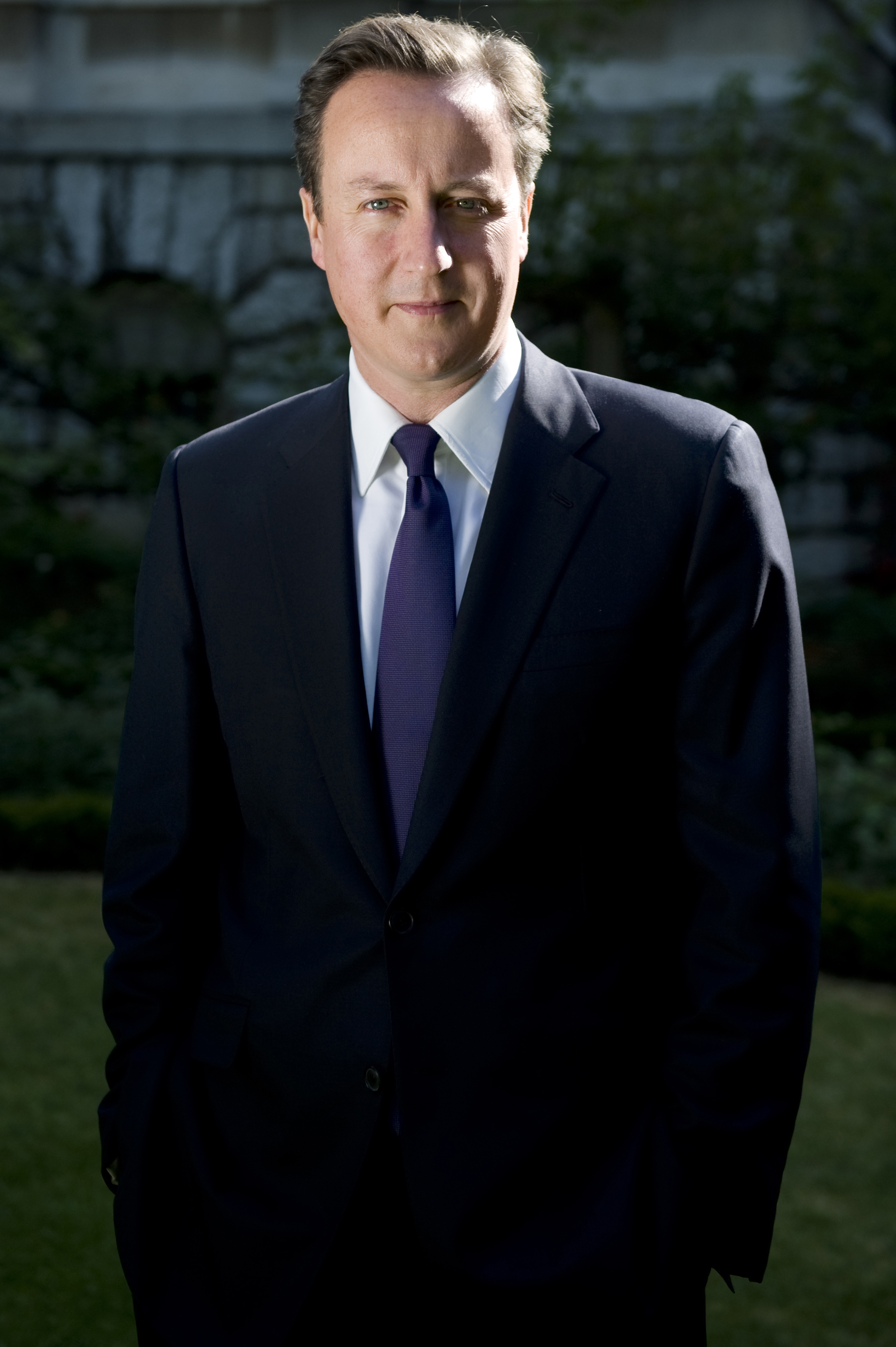
- Official portrait, 2010
- David Cameron as Leader of the Conservative Party; 6 December 2005 – 13 July 2016
- Cabinet: Cameron shadow cabinet (2005-2010); First Cameron ministry (2010-2015); Second Cameron ministry (2015-2016)
- Party: Conservative
- Election: Leadership; 2005; General; 2010; 2015
- Appointed by: Elizabeth II (Note: Only as leader of the opposition and prime minister)

David Cameron was elected as Leader of the Conservative Party in December 2005, following the resignation of Michael Howard after Conservative's defeat at the 2005 general election.

== Term as Leader of the Opposition (2005-2010) ==
=== Shadow Cabinet appointments ===
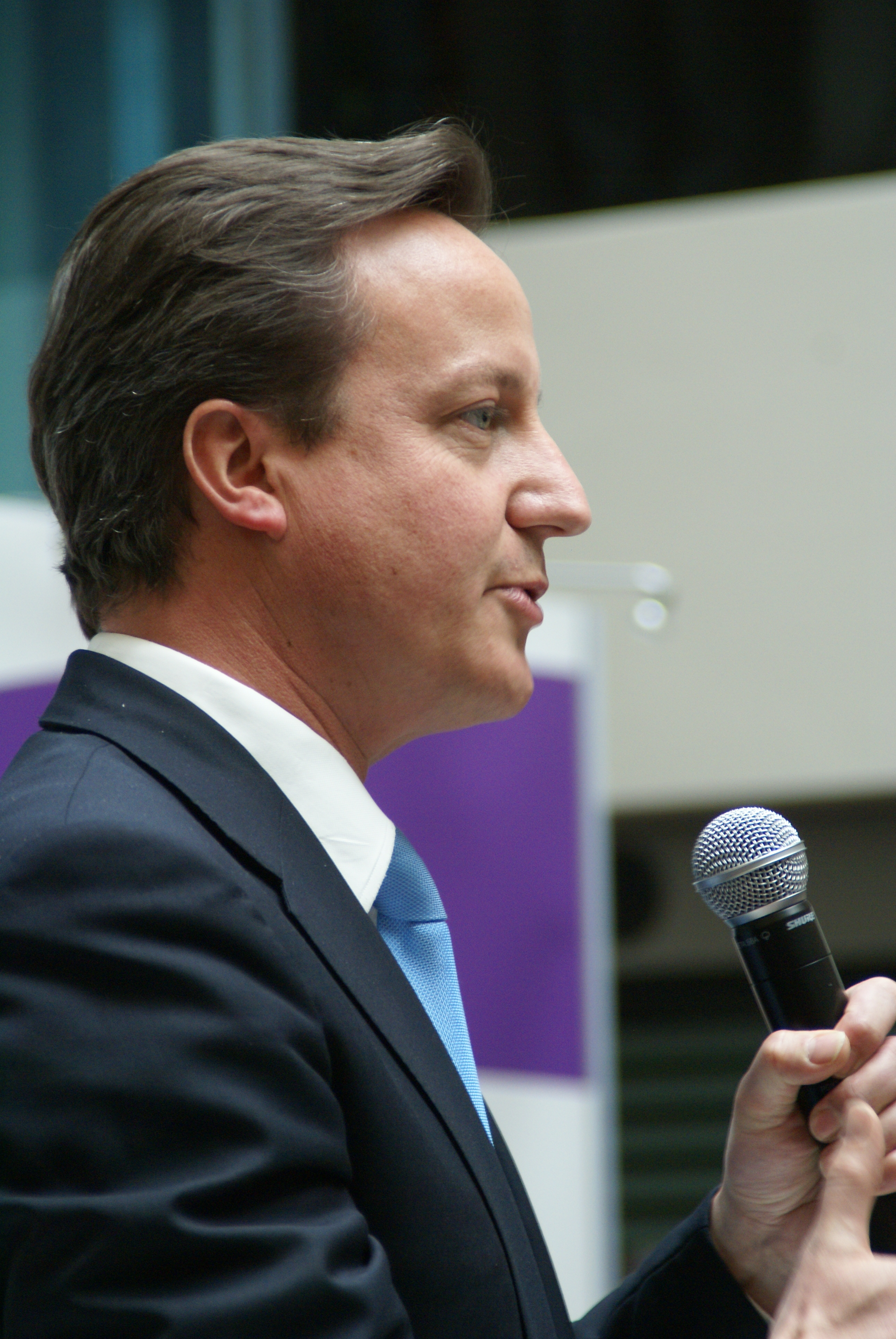
Speaking at the Home Office on 13 May 2010

His Shadow Cabinet appointments included MPs associated with the various wings of the party. Former leader William Hague was appointed to the foreign affairs brief, while both George Osborne and David Davis were retained, as shadow chancellor of the Exchequer and Shadow Home Secretary, respectively. Hague, assisted by Davis, stood in for Cameron during his paternity leave in February 2006. In June 2008 Davis announced his intention to resign as an MP, and was immediately replaced as shadow home secretary by Dominic Grieve; Davis' surprise move was seen as a challenge to the changes introduced under Cameron's leadership.

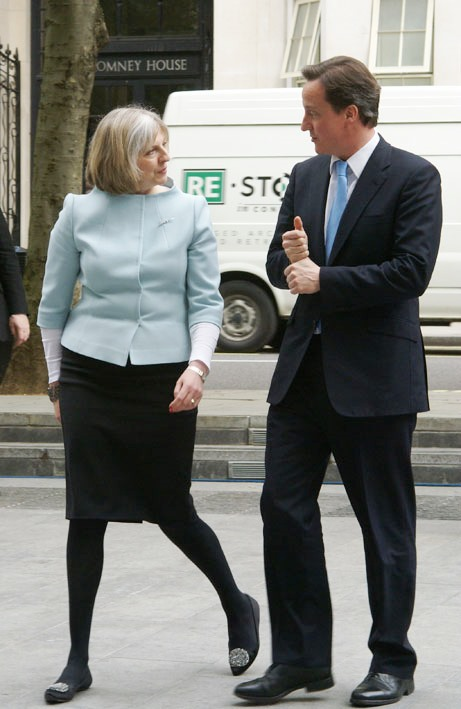
With Theresa May, who was a member of the Shadow Cabinet from 1999 until 2010

A reshuffle of the Shadow Cabinet was undertaken in January 2009, with the chief change being the appointment of former Chancellor of the Exchequer Kenneth Clarke as Shadow Business, Enterprise and Regulatory Reform Secretary. Cameron stated that "With Ken Clarke's arrival, we now have the best economic team." The reshuffle also saw eight other changes made.

=== 2010 general election ===
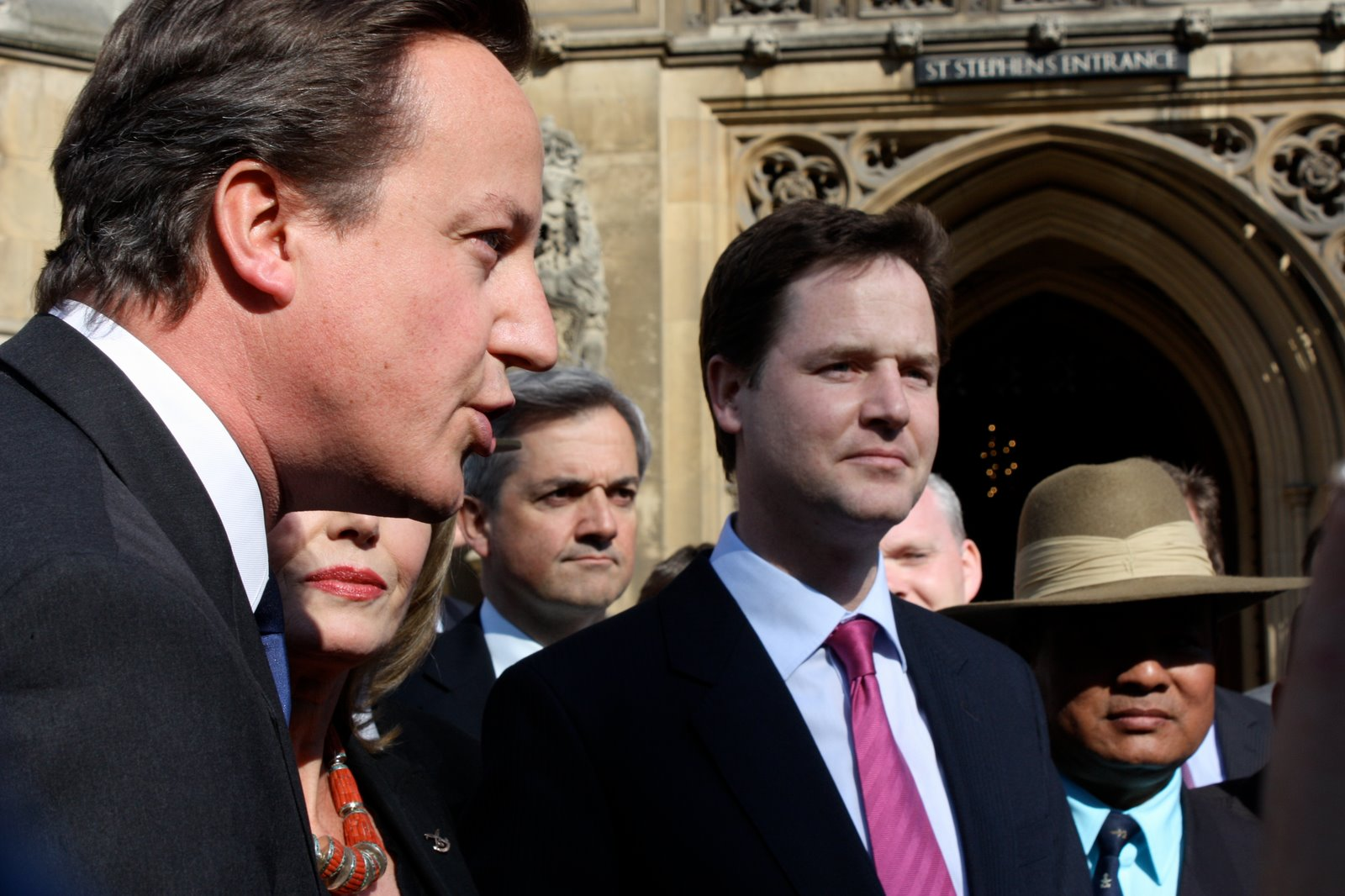
In 2009 as leader of the opposition, with Lib Dem leader Nick Clegg, who later became deputy prime minister, and Lib Dem spokesman Chris Huhne

The Conservatives had last won a general election in 1992. The 2010 general election resulted in the Conservatives, led by Cameron, winning the largest number of seats (306). This was, however, 20 seats short of an overall majority, and resulted in the nation's first hung parliament since February 1974.

==== 2010 government formation ====
Talks between Cameron and then Liberal Democrat leader Nick Clegg led to an agreed Conservative/Liberal Democrat coalition. In late 2009 Cameron had urged the Liberal Democrats to join the Conservatives in a new "national movement", saying there was "barely a cigarette paper" between them on a large number of issues. The invitation was rejected at the time by Clegg who said that the Conservatives were totally different from his party, and that the Lib Dems were the true "progressives" in UK politics.

==== 2010 government formation ====
Talks between Cameron and then Liberal Democrat leader Nick Clegg led to an agreed Conservative/Liberal Democrat coalition. In late 2009 Cameron had urged the Liberal Democrats to join the Conservatives in a new "national movement", saying there was "barely a cigarette paper" between them on a large number of issues. The invitation was rejected at the time by Clegg who said that the Conservatives were totally different from his party, and that the Lib Dems were the true "progressives" in UK politics.

== Term as Prime Minister (2010–2016) ==
=== Appointment ===
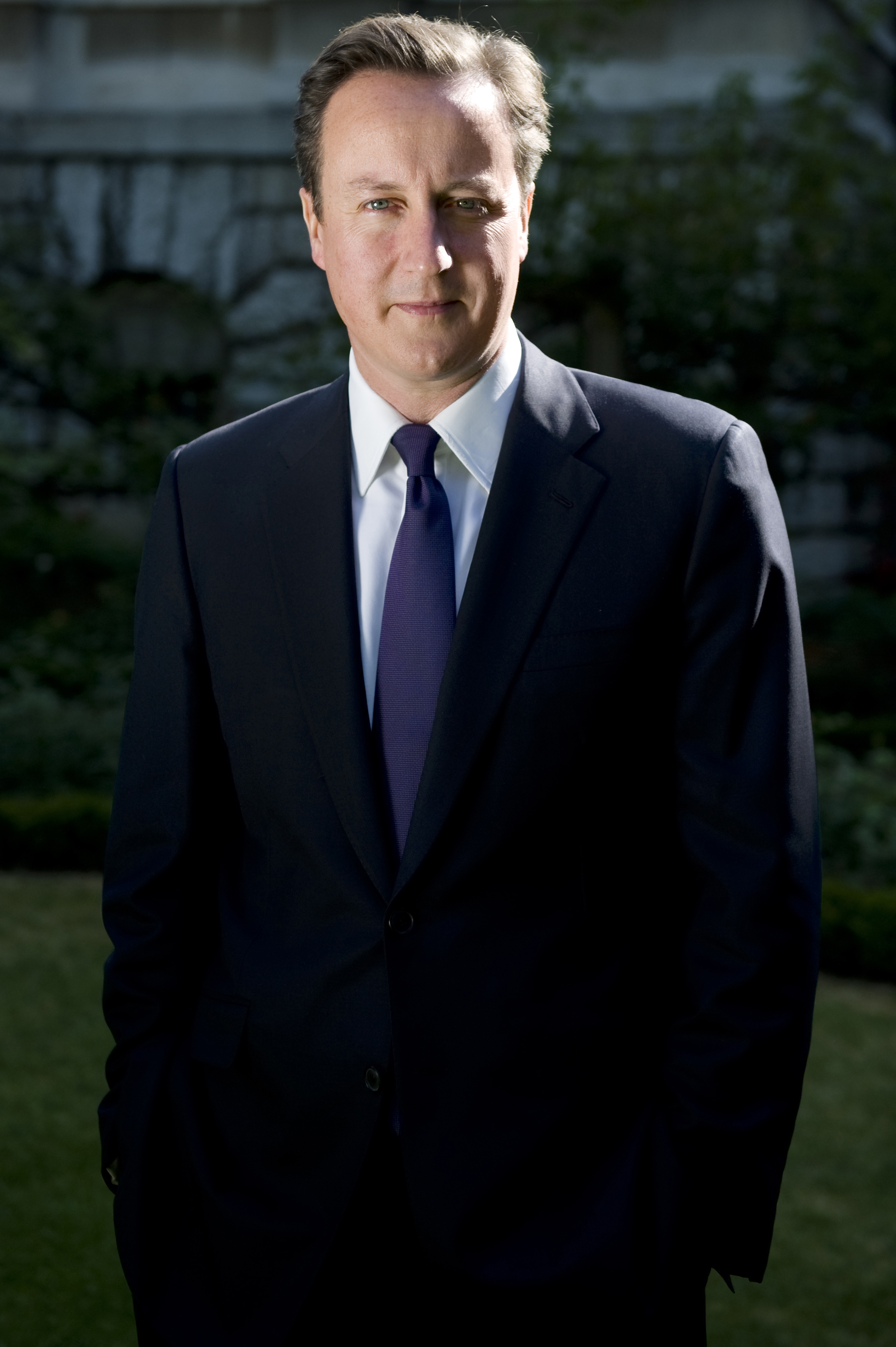
Official portrait, 2010

Elizabeth II, following Gordon Brown's resignation as prime minister on 11 May 2010, extended an invitation to Cameron to establish a new administration based on Brown's recommendation. At age 43, Cameron became the youngest prime minister since Lord Liverpool in 1812, beating the record previously set by Tony Blair in May 1997. In his first address outside 10 Downing Street, he announced his intention to form a coalition government, the first since the Second World War, with the Liberal Democrats.

Nick Clegg and I are both political leaders that want to put aside party differences and work hard for the common good and for the national interest. I believe that is the best way to get the strong government that we need, decisive government that we need today. This is going to be hard and difficult work. A coalition will throw up all sorts of challenges. But I believe together we can provide that strong and stable government that our country needs based on those values – rebuilding family, rebuilding community, above all, rebuilding responsibility in our country.

— David Cameron during his first speech as prime minister, 12 May 2010

Cameron outlined how he intended to "put aside party differences and work hard for the common good and for the national interest". As one of his first moves Cameron appointed Nick Clegg, the leader of the Liberal Democrats, as deputy prime minister on 11 May 2010. Between them, the Conservatives and Liberal Democrats controlled 363 seats in the House of Commons, giving them a comfortable majority of 76 seats.

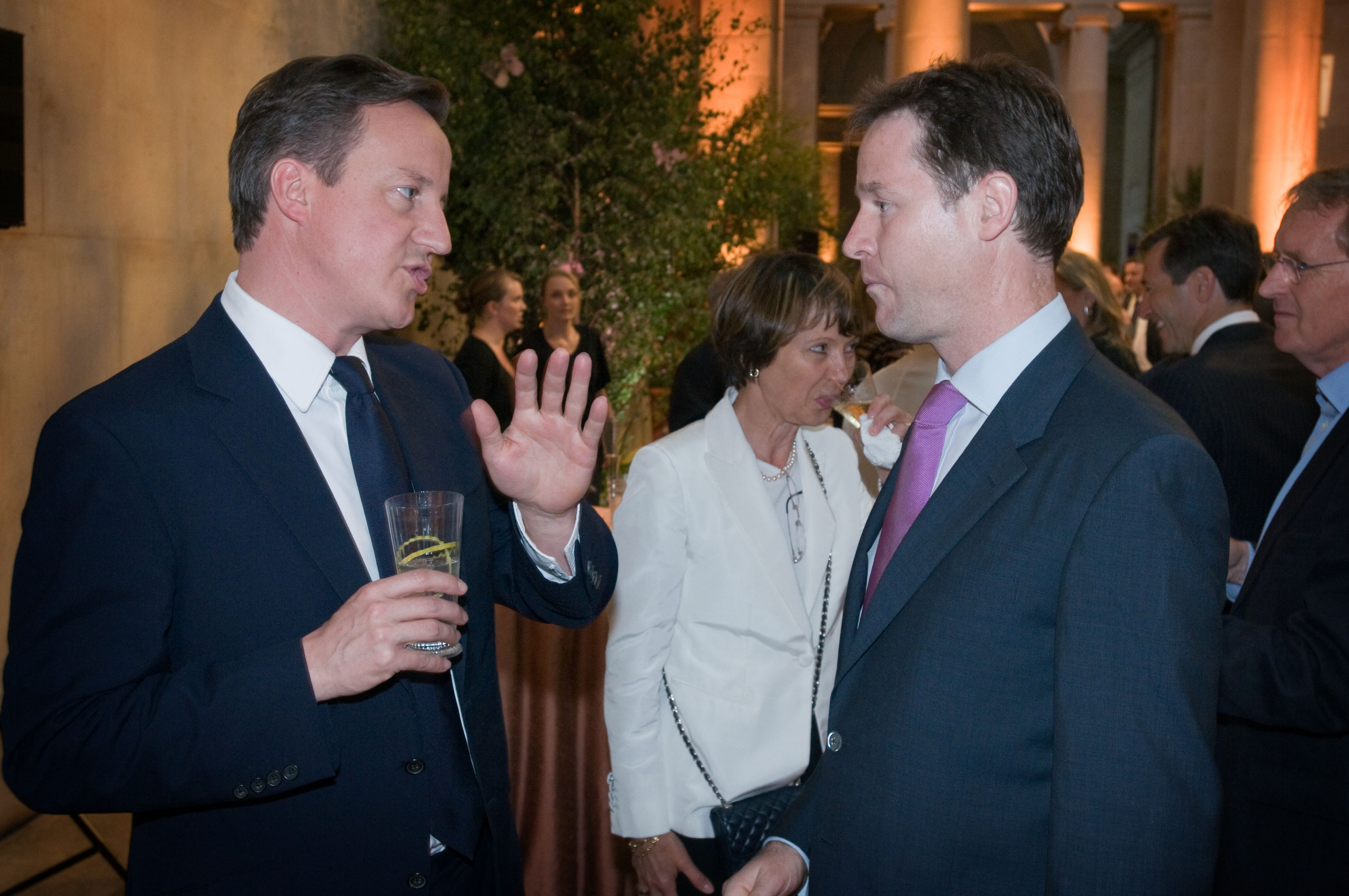
With Clegg in 2010 after entering government

In June 2010, Cameron described the economic situation as he came to power as "even worse than we thought" and warned of "difficult decisions" to be made over spending cuts. By the beginning of 2015, he was able to claim that his government's austerity programme had succeeded in halving the budget deficit, although as a percentage of GDP rather than in cash terms.

In December 2010, Cameron attended a meeting with FIFA vice-president Chung Mong-joon, in which a vote-trading deal for the right to host the 2018 World Cup in England was discussed.
