= Conservation science =

Conservation science may refer to:

- Conservation science (cultural heritage), the interdisciplinary study of care and protection of art, architecture, and other cultural works
- Conservation biology, interdisciplinary study of protection of biodiversity
- Environmental science, interdisciplinary study of protection of environment and natural resources

== See also ==
- Conservation (disambiguation)
