= Epistemic conservatism =

Epistemic conservatism is a view in epistemology about the structure of reasons or justification for belief. While there are various forms, epistemic conservatism is generally the view that a person's believing some claim is a reason in support of the claim, at least on the face of it. Others formulate epistemic conservatism as the view that one is, to some degree, justified in believing something simply because one believes it.

Expanding the thesis, epistemic conservatism implies that it is unreasonable to revise or alter our personal beliefs and ideologies without good reasons to do so. This action of revising would cause an unnecessary use of resources/energy by the individual, and it would not offer the individual any epistemic value. Epistemic conservatism sees an epistemic value in just holding one's beliefs stable.

There have been some critics of the thesis but several important methodologies assume that this thesis holds true.

== Kevin McCain's Epistemic Conservatism ==
'Properly Formulated Epistemic Conservatism' (PEC): "If S believes p and p is not incoherent, then S is justified in retaining the belief p, and S remains justified in believing p so long as p is not defeated for S."

"Defeat Condition 1 (DC1): If S has better reasons for believing ~ p than S's reasons for believing p, then S is no longer justified in believing p."

"Defeat Condition 2 (DC2): If S has reasons for believing ~p which are as good as S's reasons for believing p and the belief ~p coheres equally as well or better than the belief p does with S's other beliefs, then S is no longer justified in believing p."

This above thesis hits upon several common themes when discussing epistemic conservatism. PEC addresses the idea that when revising a belief system, individuals would seek to correct the errors piece by piece, rather than completely overhauling their ideologies. In other words, it is ideal to hold on to as many original beliefs as possible. Furthermore, PEC addresses spontaneous beliefs based on memories. It is hard to justify memory beliefs given that they are not drawn through distinct experiences, but regardless if they are/aren't supported, individuals would still have the intuition that they are justified in holding these beliefs. According to PEC, as long as a specific memory belief is not defeated for the individual, the individual would be justified in holding this belief in virtue of previously holding the memory belief. As for forgotten evidence, PEC also makes sense of this phenomenon. An example would be where someone learned about relativity theory and came to hold the belief "E=mc^2". After a long time, this person might have lost evidence supporting this specific belief, but we are intuitively drawn to claiming that they are still justified. PEC allows for this because the individual is justified in holding "E=mc^2" because they hold that belief.

== Criticisms of Epistemic Conservatism ==
=== Richard Foley's Criticism ===
In his objections, Foley describes a situation where epistemic conservatism makes irrational beliefs rational, where a contradiction exists. In his example, an individual believes "x", however they possess better reasons to believe "~x". In terms of PEC, the individual is justified in believing "x" as long as "x" is not defeated for them. In Foley's example, "x" is defeated for the individual so Defeat Condition 1 was met, thus PEC leads to the individual not being justified in believing "x", thus no contradiction exists.

=== Richard Feldman's "Lefty-Righty" Case ===
"Detective Jones has definitively narrowed down the suspects in a crime to two individuals, Lefty and Righty. There are good reasons to think that Lefty did it, but there are equally good reasons to think that Righty did it. There is conclusive reason to think that no one other than Lefty or Righty did it."

In this example, Richard Feldman questions what Detective Jones would do in the situation, as the intuition points out that Jones can not believe that Righty did the crime and Lefty did not and vice versa. He supposes that Jones came upon the belief that Lefty did it first, possibly getting Lefty's evidence first. Feldman draws the conclusion that epistemic conservatism forces our intuition away, forcing us to have Jones believe that Lefty did it. However, PEC allows for this because Jones's belief that Lefty is the culprit is defeated since he now has equal evidence to believe that Righty committed the crime. By having the two equal beliefs of "Lefty is the culprit" and "Righty is the culprit", Defeat Condition 2 was met. With PEC, Jones should withhold his belief from either of the two, thus PEC does not disagree with our natural intuitions.

== References and further reading ==
- Christensen, David. (1994). "Conservatism in Epistemology", Noûs, Vol. 28, No. 1 (Mar.), pp. 69–89.
- Fumerton, Richard. (2007). "Epistemic Conservatism: Theft or Honest Toil?", Oxford Studies in Epistemology: Vol. 2, ed. by Tamar Szabo Gendler, and John Hawthorne. Oxford University Press. ISBN 0-19-923706-9
