= PC Party =

PC Party may refer to:

- Progressive Conservative Party of Canada, a former federal party which merged into the Conservative Party of Canada in 2003
  - Progressive Conservative Party (disambiguation), various other Canadian political parties
- Progressive Canadian Party, a minor party formed 2004 after the dissolution of the Progressive Conservative Party of Canada
