= Progressive Conservative =

Progressive Conservative may refer to an advocate of progressive conservatism.

Progressive Conservative may also refer to:

== Canada ==
- Progressive Conservative Party of Canada, a former Canadian federal party; a successor of the original Conservative Party of Canada and a predecessor of the modern-day Conservative Party of Canada
- Progressive-Conservative (candidate), who supported both Progressive Party and Conservative Party

=== Provincial ===
Current

- Progressive Conservative Party of Manitoba
- Progressive Conservative Party of New Brunswick
- Progressive Conservative Party of Newfoundland and Labrador
- Progressive Conservative Association of Nova Scotia
- Progressive Conservative Party of Ontario
- Progressive Conservative Party of Prince Edward Island
- Progressive Conservative Party of Saskatchewan
- Progressive Tory Party of Alberta

Defunct

- Progressive Conservative Association of Alberta, a predecessor of the United Conservative Party of Alberta
- BC Progressive Conservative Party, name used by the Conservative Party of British Columbia from 1942 to 1991
- Progressive Conservative Party of Quebec, a failed attempt at a provincial wing that never gained support from the federal party
- Yukon Progressive Conservative Party, a predecessor of the Yukon Party

== Elsewhere ==
=== Politics ===
- Centre-right politics
- Red Tory, is an adherent of a centre-right or paternalistic-conservative political philosophy derived from the Tory tradition, predominantly in Canada, but also in the United Kingdom

=== Politicians ===
- Nick Boles, a current self-subscribed 'Independent Progressive Conservative' British MP after his departure of his former party, the Conservative Party of the United Kingdom since April 1

== See also ==
- Conservative
- Conservatism (disambiguation)
- Progressive (disambiguation)
- Progressive Conservative Party (disambiguation)
