= Conservation ministry =

Conservation ministry may refer to:

- Minister of Conservation (Manitoba), a provincial cabinet minister
- Minister of Conservation (New Zealand), a government minister
- Minister for the Environment (Western Australia), formerly Minister for Conservation and the Environment

== See also ==
- Environment minister, a cabinet position in various countries or states
- Conservation (disambiguation)
- Ministry (disambiguation)
