= Progressive Conservative Party =

Progressive Conservative Party mainly refers to a group of centre-right political parties associated with conservatism in Canada, today only at the provincial level. The parties espouse the principles of progressive conservatism.

== National ==
- Progressive Conservative Party of Canada, merged into the modern-day Conservative Party of Canada in 2003

== Provincial and territorial ==
- Progressive Conservative Association of Alberta, merged with the United Conservative Party in 2017
- Progressive Conservative Association of Nova Scotia
- Progressive Conservative Party of Manitoba
- Progressive Conservative Party of New Brunswick
- Progressive Conservative Party of Newfoundland and Labrador
- Progressive Conservative Party of Ontario
- Progressive Conservative Party of Prince Edward Island
- Progressive Conservative Party of Quebec
- Progressive Conservative Party of Saskatchewan
- British Columbia Conservative Party, formerly the British Columbia Progressive Conservative Party
- Northwest Territories Liberal-Conservative Party (1897–1905)
- Prince Edward Island Progressive Conservative Party
- Yukon Party, formerly the Yukon Progressive Conservative Party

== Other countries ==
- Progressive Conservative Party (Australia)
- Progressive Conservative Party (Romania)

== See also ==
- Conservative Party (disambiguation)
- Progressive Conservative (disambiguation)
- Progressive Party (disambiguation)
- Progressive Party of Canada
- Progressive Party of Manitoba
- Progressive Party of Saskatchewan
- PC Party (disambiguation)
- Red Tory, a person with progressive conservative leanings
