= Theresa May as Leader of the Conservative Party =

Leader of the Conservative Party from 2016 to 2019

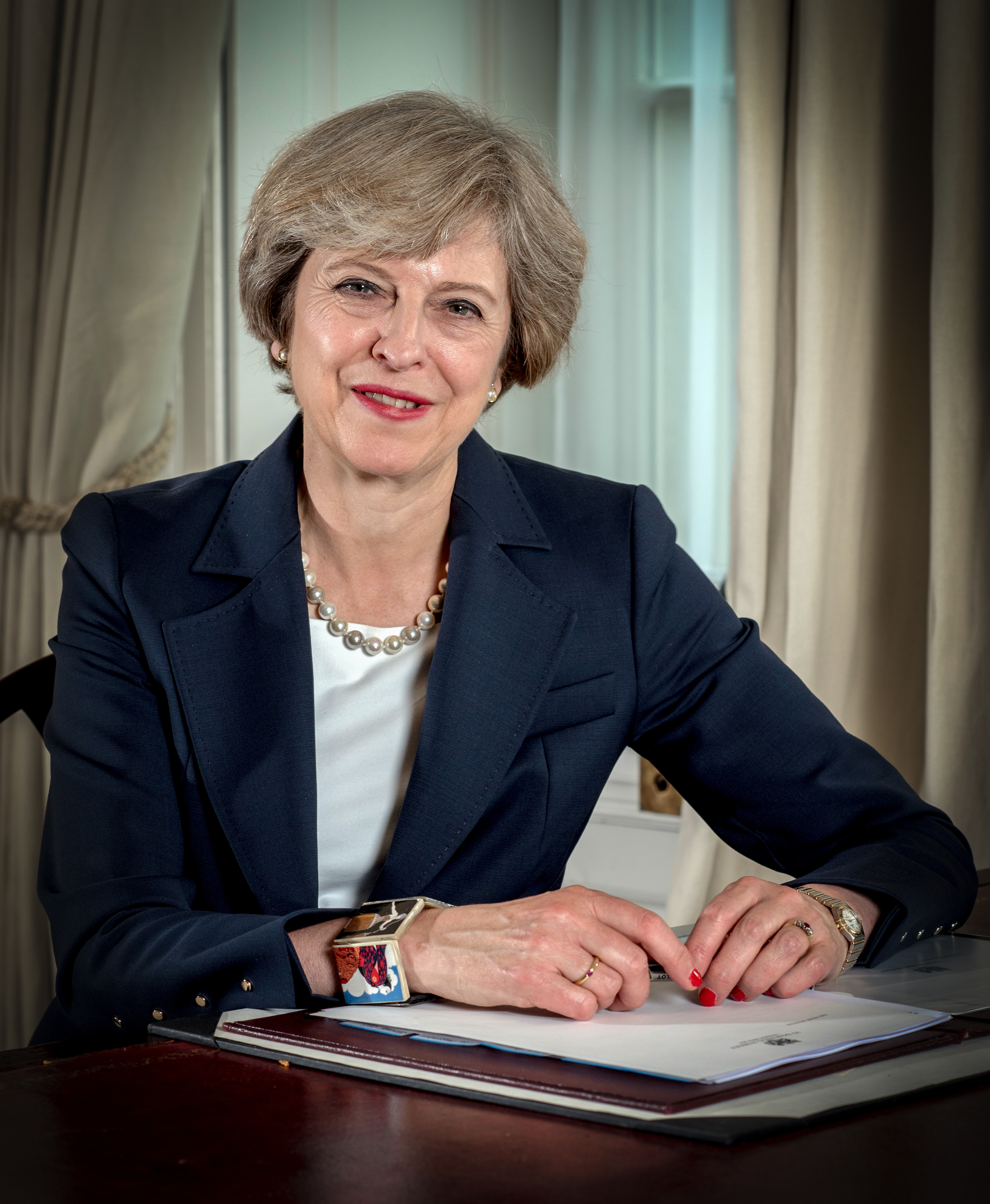
- Official portrait, 2016
- Theresa May as Leader of the Conservative Party; 13 July 2016 – 24 July 2019
- Cabinet: First May ministry (2016-2017); Second May ministry (2017-2019)
- Party: Conservative
- Election: Leadership; 2016; General; 2017
- Appointed by: Elizabeth II (Note: Only as leader of the opposition and prime minister)

Theresa May was elected as Leader of the Conservative Party in July 2016, following David Cameron's resignation amid the political crisis surrounding his government.

== Term as Prime Minister ==
=== Early days ===
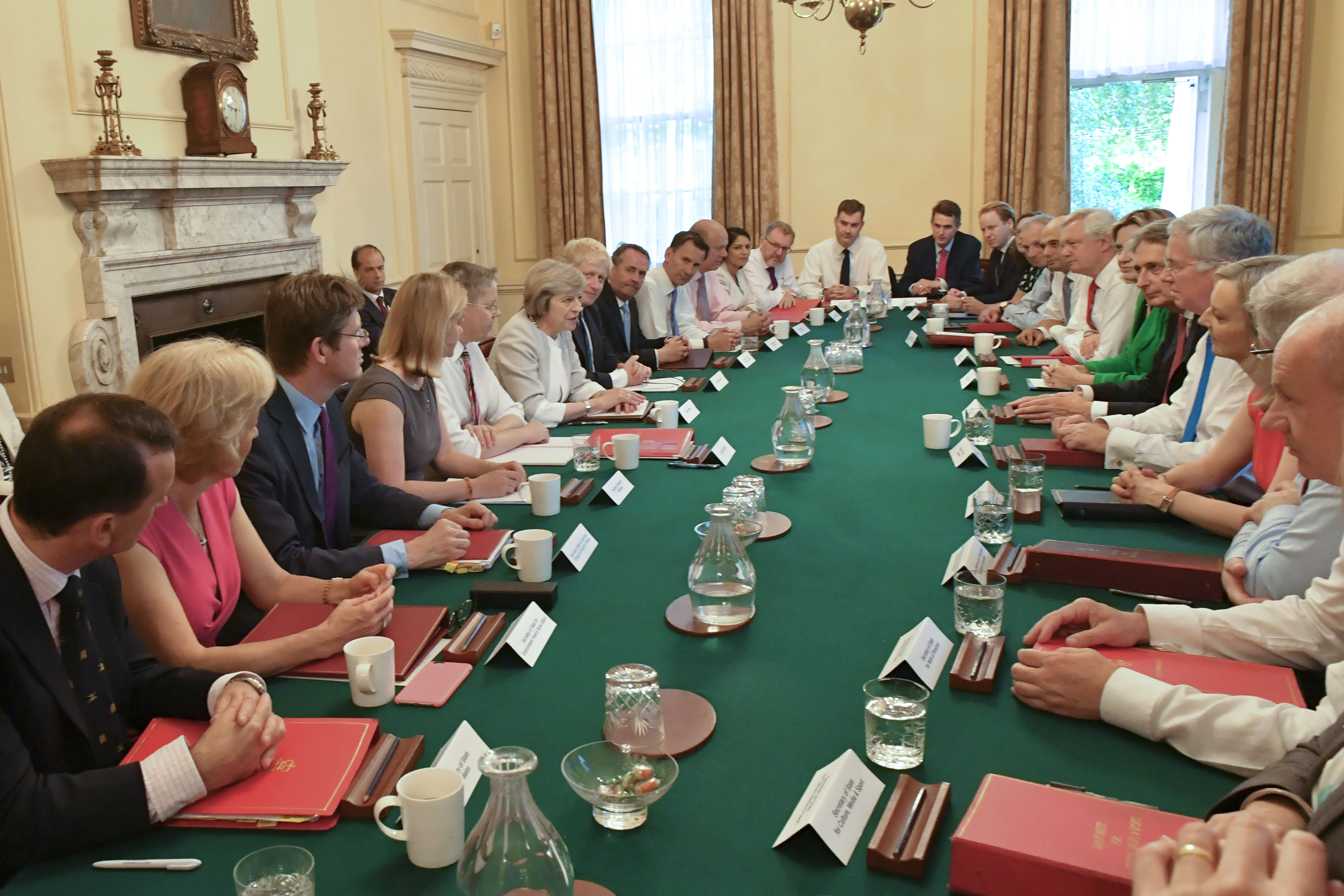
May chairing the first meeting of her cabinet.

When appointed by the Queen on 13 July 2016, May became the UK's second female prime minister, after Margaret Thatcher, and the nation's first female prime minister of the 21st century. She told the media on 11 July 2016 that she was "honoured and humbled" to ascend to the role.

Responding to some calls for a general election (reported by the news media) to confirm her mandate, "sources close to Mrs May" said there would be no such election, according to the BBC. In a speech after her appointment, May emphasised the term Unionist in the name of the Conservative Party, reminding all of "the precious, precious bond between England, Scotland, Wales and Northern Ireland." By 15 July 2016, May had travelled to Edinburgh, Scotland to meet with first minister Nicola Sturgeon, to reinforce the bond between Scotland and the rest of the country. "This visit to Scotland is my first as prime minister and I'm coming here to show my commitment to preserving this special union that has endured for centuries," she explained. After a meeting at Bute House, May offered the following comment about Scotland's role in the negotiations about the UK's exit from the EU: "I'm willing to listen to options and I've been very clear with the First Minister today that I want the Scottish government to be fully engaged in our discussion."

In August 2016, May launched an investigation aimed at identifying and reducing racism within public services.

As part of the government's plan to curb childhood obesity, May took steps to reduce sugar content of foods, though many experts criticised her as they felt that too little was being done. Notably there were widespread calls for curbing advertising of unhealthy foods to children and banning promotions of unhealthy food (such as multipacks and 'buy one, get one free') in supermarkets, restaurants, cafes and takeaways.

=== Health Service ===
Under May, consultation began over cost saving, streamlining and reduction of some services in the National Health Service (NHS). Critics feared cuts that could "put lives at risk" even though the review focused primarily on reducing costs. An article in The Guardian suggested possible benefits from the review but feared secrecy within the NHS was hindering effective public discussion. Liberal Democrat MP Norman Lamb accepted the review made sense in principle but stated: "While it is important that the NHS becomes more efficient and sustainable for future generations, redesign of care models will only get us so far – and no experts believe the Conservative doctrine that an extra £8 billion funding by 2020 will be anywhere near enough."

=== Grammar schools ===
In September 2016, May announced that she would end a ban on new grammar schools. A BBC article suggested grammar schools would be "dumbed down" while other secondary schools in the area would "suffer". Jon Coles of United Learning, which controls 60 schools was "unconvinced more grammar schools would raise standards". Poor children and children from families that are "just about managing" tend to miss out on grammar school places. None of the top ten nations with the best education have UK style grammar schools selecting at age 11. The Royal Society commissioned research from the Education Policy Institute which showed that disadvantaged pupils did worse overall in science and maths in regions with selective education. A cross party Select Committee of MPs described the issue of grammar school expansion as an "unnecessary distraction" and cast doubt on the claim grammar schools improve social mobility. Many speakers emphasised the need to tackle funding problems' effects on the whole of schooling. Following the outcome of the 2017 general election, May's grammar school policy was not included in the Queen's Speech, and was deemed unlikely to be pursued.

=== Child poverty ===
The Child Poverty Unit was merged with the Department for Work and Pensions leading to fears by some that child poverty would be less of a priority under May. This "ran counter" to May's pledge to "govern for everyone and fight the injustice of being born poor". A study said that from 2014 to 2015 28% of UK children were poor. The Child Poverty Action Group feared restricting the Child Poverty Unit to one department would reduce its effectiveness. The Institute for Fiscal Studies projected a 50% increase in child poverty by 2020 due to benefit cuts and 'sluggish wages'.

=== Ministerial appointments ===
May appointed new Cabinet members in "one of the most sweeping government reshuffles for decades", described by The Telegraph as "a brutal cull": several prominent members, including six of David Cameron's ministers, were removed from their posts. The early appointments were interpreted both as "centrist and conciliatory", an effort to reunite the party in the wake of the UK's vote to leave the European Union, and as "a shift to the right", according to The Guardian. Robert Peston of ITV News specifically labelled her new Cabinet as right wing.

May abolished the Department for Energy and Climate Change in a move widely criticised by Greenpeace which expressed concern the new government failed to see the threat from climate change, Friends of the Earth which said climate change "is happening now while the new government lowers its priority", and also by other more impartial peoples and groups. Climate change was included within the scope of the new Department for Business, Energy and Industrial Strategy.

Upon becoming prime minister, May appointed former mayor of London Boris Johnson as foreign secretary, former Secretary of State for Energy and Climate Change Amber Rudd as home secretary, and former shadow home secretary David Davis to the newly created office of Brexit secretary. Her choice of Johnson as Foreign Secretary "raised eyebrows", and drew some criticism from the press. Liam Fox and Philip Hammond, both of whom had previously served as Secretary of State for Defence (Fox from 2010 to 2011 and Hammond from 2011 to 2014), with Hammond having served as foreign secretary from 2014 to 2016, were appointed to the newly created office of International Trade Secretary, along with Chancellor of the Exchequer, respectively. Replacing Michael Gove, Liz Truss was made Justice Secretary, the "first female Lord Chancellor in the thousand-year history of the role". Andrea Leadsom, who was energy minister and May's primary competitor for party leader, was made the new Secretary of State for Environment, Food and Rural Affairs. However, former Northern Ireland Secretary Theresa Villiers resigned from Cabinet after May offered her a post which was "not one which I felt I could take on".

May jointly appointed Fiona Hill and Nick Timothy on 14 July as her Downing Street Chiefs of Staff. Both had been political advisers to her at the Home Office before both working outside the government for a brief period before working on her leadership campaign. The three ministers with new roles who worked to negotiate Brexit all espoused the Leave vote: David Davis, Liam Fox and Boris Johnson.

=== 2017 general election ===
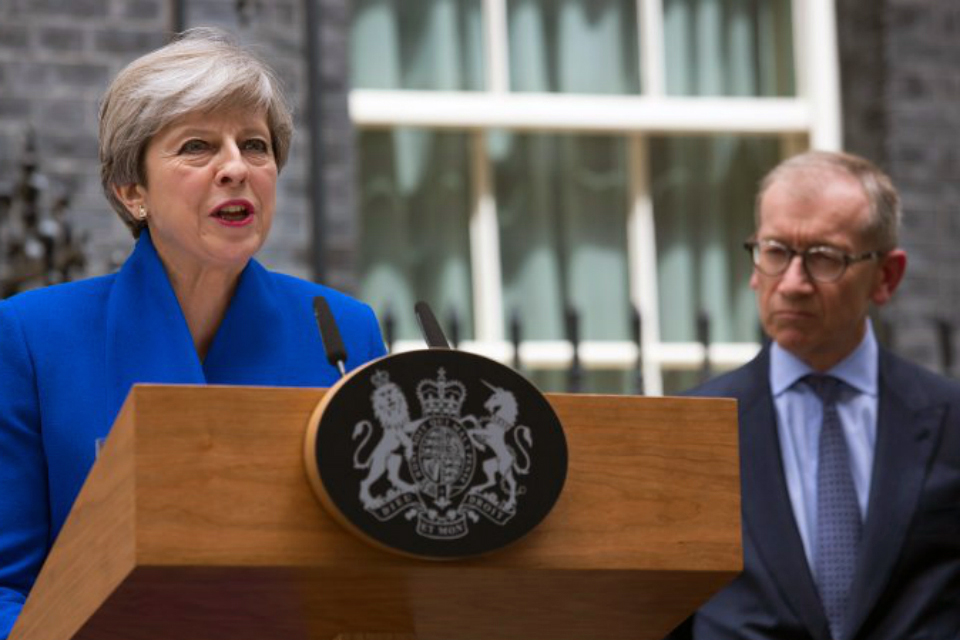
May giving her first statement upon returning to 10 Downing Street following the 2017 general election

On 18 April 2017, in a surprise statement made outside 10 Downing Street, May announced that she was to seek parliamentary approval for an early election. She explained that, following the country's decision in summer 2016 to leave the European Union, she had "only recently and reluctantly come to this conclusion" that although she had "said that there should be no election until 2020", that "the only way to guarantee certainty and stability for the years ahead is to hold this election and seek your support for the decisions I must take." May had previously indicated through a spokesperson she had no plan for a general election; the spokesperson stated "There isn't going to be one. It isn't going to happen. There is not going to be a general election." She denied there would be an election many times. On 19 April MPs gave May the two-thirds supermajority required to call the snap election she had asked for. MPs voted 522 in favour and 13 against, "giving the go-ahead" for the election to be held on 8 June 2017.

During an ITV News interview on the campaign trail, May said that the naughtiest thing she had ever done was running through fields of wheat as a child. The comment was the subject of sustained media commentary and became closely associated with May.

As of 9 June the Conservative Party had lost seats and Labour had gained seats. The Conservatives remained the largest single party but without an absolute majority. In the immediate aftermath of the election, it was unclear if May would continue as prime minister. She stated that she would have an informal understanding with the DUP to keep her party in government.

On 10 June 10 Downing Street issued a statement that a Conservative–DUP agreement was reached in principle. A few hours later, the statement was retracted when it was claimed that it had been "issued in error" and that talks between the Conservative Party and DUP were still ongoing.

On 11 June former chancellor of the exchequer, George Osborne, described May as a "dead woman walking".

=== Final months in office ===
==== Announcement of resignation ====
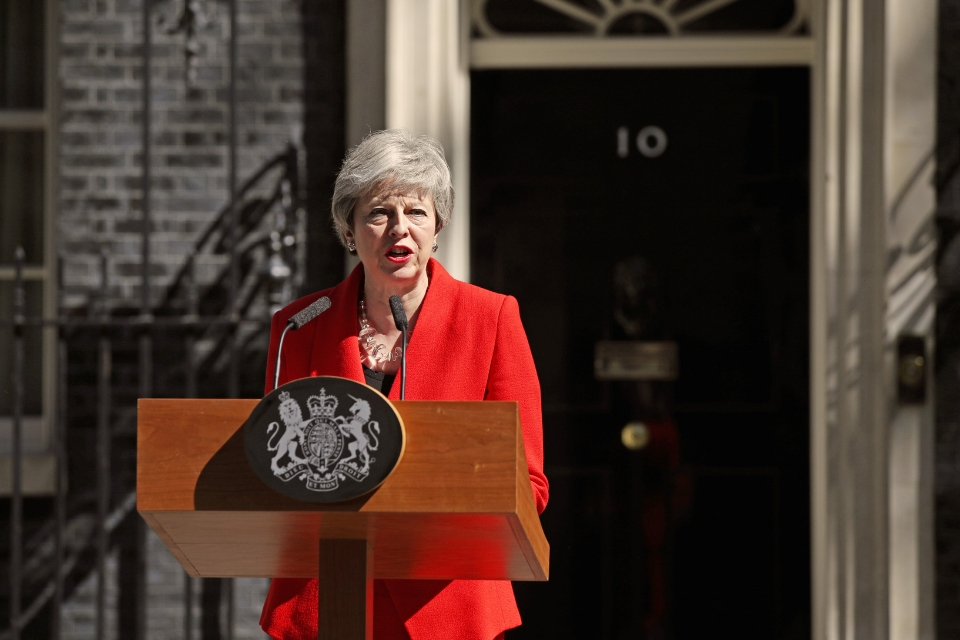
May announces her resignation outside 10 Downing Street on 24 May 2019; she left office on 24 July.

On 27 March 2019 at a meeting of the 1922 Committee, May confirmed that she would "not lead the UK in the next stage of Brexit negotiations", meaning she was expected to resign after the third meaningful vote, if it had passed successfully. However, no date was stated, and her reported wording was ambiguous and thus carried no binding force. On 29 March, the third meaningful vote was defeated, and while May did not state anything in regard to standing down, Corbyn stated that if May could not find an alternative to her deal "she must go, not at an indeterminate date in the future but now."

On 22 April it was announced that the leaders of 70 Conservative Associations had signed a petition calling for a vote of no confidence. Under party rules an Extraordinary General Meeting must be convened if one is demanded by 65 associations. The non-binding vote, to be determined by 800 of the party's senior officials, would be the first time such an instance had occurred. On 24 April, the party's 1922 Committee ruled out changing the leadership challenge rules, but its chair, Graham Brady, asked for clarity on when May would step down from office.

In the 23 May European Parliament election, the Conservative Party lost 15 seats in the European Parliament (placing them fifth, behind the Brexit Party, Liberal Democrats, Labour Party and Green Party), achieved a 9% vote share, and nursed what many called the worst nationwide election result in their 185-year history. The next day, May announced that she would resign as leader of the Conservative and Unionist Party effective 7 June 2019, remaining leader for Donald Trump's state visit. She stated, "it is now clear to me that it is in the best interests of the country for a new prime minister to lead that effort [Brexit]."

==== Reaction ====
Jeremy Corbyn
(@jeremycorbyn)
tweeted:

Theresa May is right to resign. She's now accepted what the country's known for months: she can't govern, and nor can her divided and disintegrated party.
Whoever becomes the new Tory leader must let the people decide our country's future, through an immediate General Election.

24 May 2019

Conservative MPs Liam Fox, Jeremy Hunt, Michael Gove, Steve Baker, Andrea Leadsom, Julian Smith, Dominic Raab, Boris Johnson, Matt Hancock, Sajid Javid and Philip Hammond were among those paying tribute to May after her resignation announcement.

Leader of the Opposition Jeremy Corbyn tweeted that it was "right" for May to have left her post, and used the opportunity to call for an early general election. He later said he could understand the "stress" May was going through. Deputy Labour leader Tom Watson said that May had an "unenviably difficult job" and deemed that "she did it badly."

Liberal Democrat leader Sir Vince Cable responded with a similar message to Labour, saying "she [May] was right to recognise that her administration had reached the end of the road."

The European Commission said that President Jean-Claude Juncker lauded May as "a woman of courage," and that he viewed her resignation "without personal joy."

=== Donald Trump state visit ===
May was strongly criticised in the United Kingdom by members of all major parties, including her own, for refusing to condemn Donald Trump's Executive Order 13769 (colloquially known as the "Muslim ban") as well as for inviting Trump to a state visit with Queen Elizabeth II. More than 1.8 million signed an official parliamentary e-petition which said that "Donald Trump's well documented misogyny and vulgarity disqualifies him from being received by Her Majesty the Queen or the Prince of Wales," and Labour leader Jeremy Corbyn said in Prime Minister's Questions (PMQs) that Trump should not be welcomed to Britain "while he abuses our shared values with his shameful Muslim ban and attacks on refugees' and women's rights" and said that Trump should be banned from the UK until the bar on Muslims entering the US is lifted. Baroness Warsi, former chair of the Conservatives, accused May of "bowing down" to Trump, who she described as "a man who has no respect for women, disdain for minorities, little value for LGBT communities, no compassion clearly for the vulnerable and whose policies are rooted in divisive rhetoric." London Mayor Sadiq Khan and the Conservative leader in Scotland, Ruth Davidson, also called for the visit to be cancelled. In a statement, Corbyn said, "Theresa May should not be rolling out the red carpet for a state visit to honour a president who rips up vital international treaties, backs climate change denial and uses racist and misogynist rhetoric. Maintaining an important relationship with the United States does not require the pomp and ceremony of a state visit. It is disappointing that the Prime Minister has again opted to kowtow to this US administration." He confirmed he was intending to boycott the state banquet at Buckingham Palace in honour of President Trump.

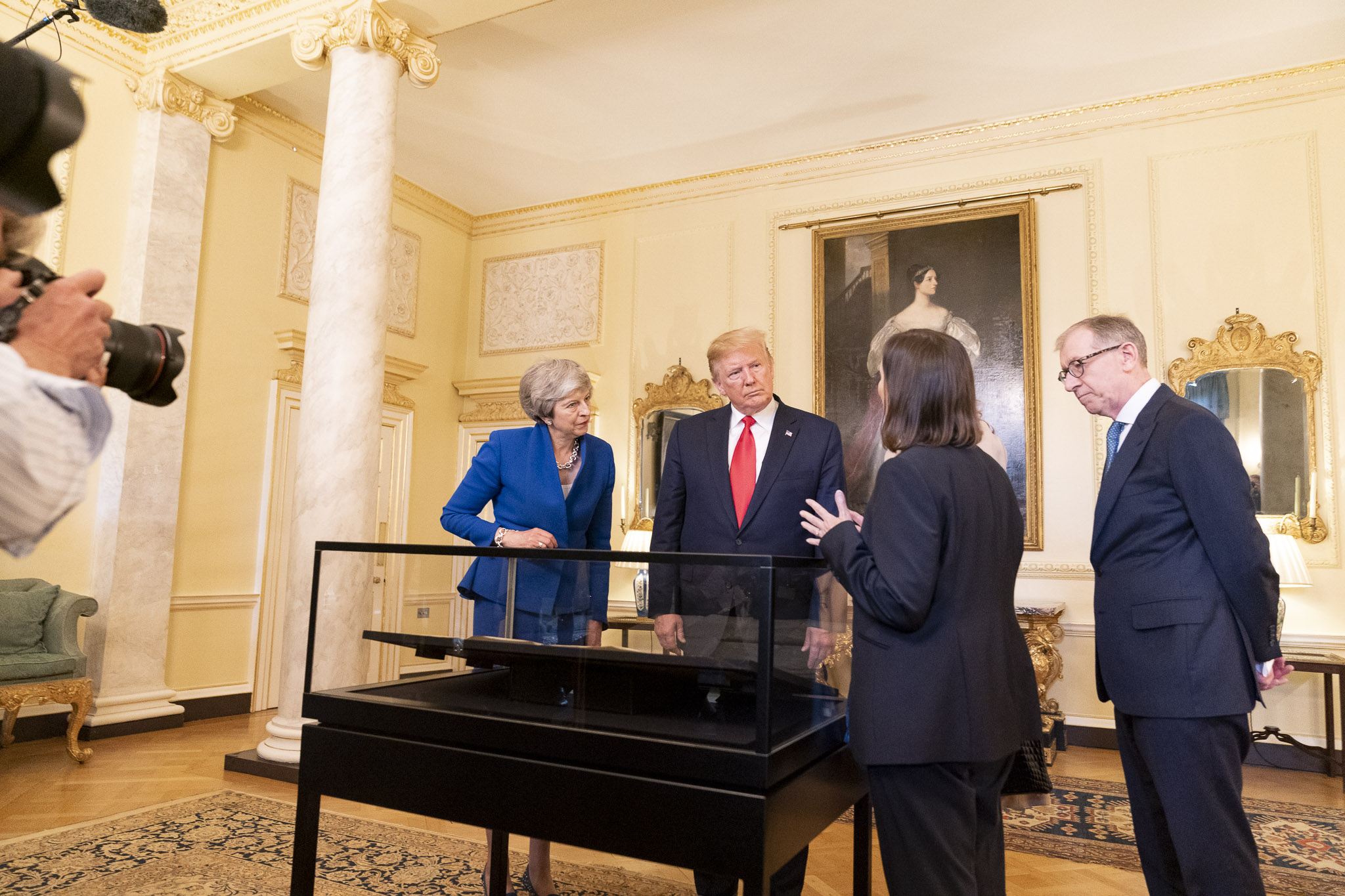
Trump and May viewed a copy of the American Declaration of Independence inside Downing Street

Trump, along with First Lady Melania Trump, their adult children, and a number of members of his administration, landed at London Stansted Airport on 3 June 2019 to begin their three-day state visit. They were greeted at the airport by the United States Ambassador to the United Kingdom Woody Johnson and Foreign Secretary Jeremy Hunt. That day he met the Queen, Prince Charles and other members of the Royal Family at Buckingham Palace, and in the evening, paid tribute to the Queen in a state banquet with May.

The next day, Trump and May partook in a breakfast meeting of British and American business leaders, with the intention to boost trade links between the two countries. Mr and Mrs Trump then arrived at Downing Street in the vehicle Cadillac One, and were shown a copy of the American Declaration of Independence inside Downing Street. During this same time, Jeremy Corbyn spoke at a rally against the state visit, in nearby Trafalgar Square. At a joint press conference at the Foreign and Commonwealth Office with May, Trump said he had turned down a request from Corbyn to meet during the visit. A Labour spokesman said Corbyn remained "ready to engage with the president on a range of issues, including the climate emergency, threats to peace and the refugee crisis." Trump said that the United States and United Kingdom have the "greatest alliance the world has ever known", promising a "phenomenal" trade deal after the UK leaves the EU, and adding that "everything is on the table" – including the NHS.

News agencies reported that Trump seemed to spend more time with Conservative leadership contenders on the visit than he did with May, holding a private meeting with Hunt on Tuesday night, speaking to Michael Gove at the state banquet and having a 20-minute phone call with Boris Johnson. He also met Nigel Farage, May's former European election rival from the Brexit Party.

==== D-Day 75th anniversary ====
On the third day of the state visit, Trump and May travelled to Portsmouth to attend the 75th D-Day anniversary commemorative ceremonies. Members of the armed forces and more than 300 veterans attended the event, which included a flypast of the Red Arrows. May hosted a total of 15 world leaders and used the occasion to call for continued Western unity in tackling what she called "new and evolving security threats." The last time outside a formal summit that Britain had hosted the multitude of international political figures seen in Portsmouth was during the 2012 Olympics under David Cameron.

=== Caretaker Prime Minister ===
The Conservative Party fell to third place in the 6 June 2019 Peterborough by-election, behind winners Labour and the Brexit Party in second place, in what was historically a Conservative-Labour marginal seat. May remained as 'caretaker' Prime Minister, awaiting the election of a successor by the Conservative Party membership in the 2019 leadership election. The winner of the contest was declared on 23 July to be Boris Johnson MP.

On 10 June, the BBC announced that it would end free TV licences for most of its consumers over the age of 75, by June 2020. May said she was "very disappointed" with the BBC's decision and urged the corporation to rethink its budgeting plan.

On 12 June, May announced the terms of a new government strategy to tackle climate change, pledging Britain to cut greenhouse gas emissions to a net zero figure by 2050. This followed the Committee on Climate Change's report in May, which said that the net zero figure is reachable by that date at no added cost from previous estimates.

In Prime Minister's Questions on 17 June, May said that she would remain as MP for Maidenhead after stepping down as prime minister. She said she was "looking forward" to "devoting her full time" to her Maidenhead constituency.

At the G20 Osaka summit, May attended a bilateral meeting with Russian president Vladimir Putin and berated the Salisbury nerve agent attack as a "despicable act". She further confronted Putin over a "wider pattern of unacceptable behaviour".

On 12 July, May created a new body, the Office for Tackling Injustices, to monitor government efforts to tackle "deep-seated societal injustice" and to use data to "provide the catalyst" for better policies.
