= Conversation (magazine) =

UK-based poetry magazine

The Conversation Papers
- Publisher: The Conversation Paperpress
- Country: United Kingdom
- Website: conversationpoetry.co.uk

The Conversation Papers (formerly Conversation Poetry Quarterly) is a UK-based poetry magazine founded in 2007 and produced by The Conversation Paperpress. The magazine aims to promote the idea of poetry as a socially critical art and is the connected to the Dialecticist school of poetic thought.

In 2009 it became the English-language publication of The Conversation International - a radical writing and publishing collective with members from countries across the world, with the aim of creating a cross-cultural poetic dialogue through translation and co-operative publishing.
