= Conserve =

Conserve may refer to:

- Conserve (condiment), a preserve made from a mixture of fruits or vegetables
- Conserve (NGO), an Indian environmental organization
- Conserve (publisher), a Dutch publisher
- Conserved sequence, a protein or nucleic acid that has remained similar throughout evolution

== See also ==
- Conservation (disambiguation)
