= Conservative government =

Conservative or Tory government may refer to:

== Canada ==
In Canadian politics, a Conservative government may refer to the following governments administered by the Conservative Party of Canada or one of its historical predecessors:

- 1st Canadian Ministry, the Canadian government under Sir John A. Macdonald (1867–1873)
- 3rd Canadian Ministry, the Canadian government under Sir John A. Macdonald (1878–1891)
- 4th Canadian Ministry, the Canadian government under Sir John Abbott (1891–1892)
- 5th Canadian Ministry, the Canadian government under Sir John Sparrow David Thompson (1892–1894)
- 6th Canadian Ministry, the Canadian government under Sir Mackenzie Bowell (1894–1896)
- 7th Canadian Ministry, the Canadian government under Sir Charles Tupper (1896)
- 9th Canadian Ministry, the Canadian government under Sir Robert Borden (1911–1917)
- 10th Canadian Ministry, the Canadian government under Sir Robert Borden (1917–1920)
- 11th Canadian Ministry, the Canadian government under Arthur Meighen (1920–1921)
- 13th Canadian Ministry, the Canadian government under Arthur Meighen (1926)
- 15th Canadian Ministry, the Canadian government under R. B. Bennett (1930–1935)
- 18th Canadian Ministry, the Canadian government under John Diefenbaker (1957–1963)
- 21st Canadian Ministry, the Canadian government under Joe Clark (1979–1980)
- 24th Canadian Ministry, the Canadian government under Brian Mulroney (1984–1993)
- 25th Canadian Ministry, the Canadian government under Kim Campbell (1993)
- 28th Canadian Ministry, the Canadian government under Stephen Harper (2006–2015)

== United Kingdom ==
In British politics before 1834, a Tory government may refer to the following governments administered by the Tories:

- Carmarthen–Halifax ministry, the British government dominated by Lord Carmarthen and Lord Halifax (1689–1690)
- Godolphin–Marlborough ministry, the British government dominated by Lord Godolphin and the Duke of Marlborough (1702–1710)
- Harley ministry, the British government dominated by Robert Harley (1710–1714)
- Bute ministry, the British government under Lord Bute (1762–1763)
- First Pitt ministry, the British government under William Pitt the Younger (1783–1801)
- Addington ministry, the British government under Henry Addington (1801–1804)
- Second Pitt ministry, the British government under William Pitt the Younger (1804–1806)
- Ministry of All the Talents, the British government under Lord Grenville (1806–1807)
- Second Portland ministry, the British government under the Duke of Portland (1807–1809)
- Perceval ministry, the British government under Spencer Perceval (1809–1812)
- Liverpool ministry, the British government under Lord Liverpool (1812–1827)
- Wellington–Peel ministry, the British government under the Duke of Wellington and Sir Robert Peel (1828–1830)

In British politics from 1834, a Conservative government may refer to the following governments administered by the Conservative Party:

- Wellington caretaker ministry, the British government under the Duke of Wellington (1834)
- First Peel ministry, the British government under Sir Robert Peel (1834–1835)
- Second Peel ministry, the British government under Sir Robert Peel (1841–1846)
- Who? Who? ministry, the British government under Lord Derby (1852)
- Second Derby–Disraeli ministry, the British government under Lord Derby and Benjamin Disraeli (1858–1859)
- Third Derby–Disraeli ministry, the British government under Lord Derby and Benjamin Disraeli respectively (1866–1868)
- Second Disraeli ministry, the British government under Lord Beaconsfield, better known as Disraeli (1874–1880)
- First Salisbury ministry, the British government under Lord Salisbury (1885–1886)
- Second Salisbury ministry, the British government under Lord Salisbury (1886–1892)
- Unionist government, 1895–1905, the British government under Lord Salisbury and Arthur Balfour respectively
- Conservative government, 1922–1924, the British government under Bonar Law and Stanley Baldwin respectively
- Second Baldwin ministry, the British government under Stanley Baldwin (1924–1929)
- National Government, several British ministries dominated by the Conservative Party
  - National Government (1931), the British government under Ramsay MacDonald
  - National Government (1931–1935), the British government under Ramsay MacDonald
  - National Government (1935–1937), the British government under Stanley Baldwin
  - National Government (1937–1939), the British government under Neville Chamberlain
  - Chamberlain war ministry, the British government under Neville Chamberlain (1939–1940)
- Churchill war ministry, the British government under Winston Churchill (1940–1945)
- Churchill caretaker ministry, the British government under Winston Churchill (1945)
- Third Churchill ministry, the British government under Sir Winston Churchill (1951–1955)
- Eden ministry, the British government under Sir Anthony Eden (1955–1957)
- Conservative government, 1957–1964, the British government under Harold Macmillan and Sir Alec Douglas-Home respectively
- Heath ministry, the British government under Edward Heath (1970–1974)
- First Thatcher ministry, the British government under Margaret Thatcher (1979–1983)
- Second Thatcher ministry, the British government under Margaret Thatcher (1983–1987)
- Third Thatcher ministry, the British government under Margaret Thatcher (1987–1990)
- First Major ministry, the British government under John Major (1990–1992)
- Second Major ministry, the British government under John Major (1992–1997)
- Cameron–Clegg coalition, the British government under David Cameron and Nick Clegg (2010–2015)
- Second Cameron ministry, the British government under David Cameron (2015–2016)
- First May ministry, the British government under Theresa May (2016–2017)
- Second May ministry, the British government under Theresa May (2017–2019)
- First Johnson ministry, the British government under Boris Johnson (2019)
- Second Johnson ministry, the British government under Boris Johnson (2019–2022)
- Truss ministry, the British government under Liz Truss (2022)
- Sunak ministry, the British government under Rishi Sunak (2022–2024)

== See also ==
- Conservative Party leadership election
- List of British governments
- List of Canadian ministries
- List of conservative parties
