= Conservation =

Conservation is the preservation or efficient use of resources, or the conservation of various quantities under physical laws.

Conservation may also refer to:

== Environment and natural resources ==
- Nature conservation, the protection and management of the environment and natural resources
  - Wetland conservation, protecting and preserving areas where water exists at or near the Earth's surface, such as swamps, marshes and bogs.
- Conservation biology, the science of protection and management of biodiversity
- Conservation movement, political, environmental, or social movement that seeks to protect natural resources, including biodiversity and habitat
- Conservation organization, an organization dedicated to protection and management of the environment or natural resources
- Wildlife conservation, the practice of protecting wild species and their habitats in order to prevent species from going extinct
- Conservation (magazine), published by the Society for Conservation Biology from 2000 to 2014
  - Conservation Biology (journal), scientific journal of the Society for Conservation Biology
- Water conservation, the aim to sustainably manage the natural resource of fresh water, protect the hydrosphere, and meet current and future human demand.

== Physical laws ==
- Conservation law, principle that a particular measurable property of an isolated physical system does not change as the system evolves over time
  - Conservation of energy, principle that the total energy of an isolated system remains constant over time
  - Conservation of mass, principle that the mass of any closed system must remain constant over time
  - Conservation of linear momentum, principle that the total momentum of a closed system is constant
  - Conservation of angular momentum, principle that total angular momentum of a system is constant
  - Charge conservation, principle that the total electric charge in an isolated system never changes

== Land designated for conservation ==
- Conservation area (United Kingdom), an area considered worthy of preservation because of its architectural or historic interest
- Conservation designation, the status of an area of land in terms of conservation or protection
- Conservation district, government entities that help manage and protect land and water resources in U.S. states and insular areas
- Conservation easement, a power of an organization to constrain the exercise of rights otherwise held by a landowner to achieve certain conservation purposes
- Conservation community, a community committed to saving large parcels of land from ecological degradation

== Other uses ==
- Conservation (psychology), learning development of logical thinking, according to Jean Piaget
- Conservation and restoration of cultural property, the conservation or restoration of cultural heritage
  - Conservation and restoration of immovable cultural property
  - Conservation science (cultural property), the interdisciplinary study of conservation of cultural works

== See also ==
- Conservation ministry (disambiguation)
- Conservation science (disambiguation)
- Conservatism (disambiguation)
- Conserve (disambiguation)
- Conserved quantity, in mathematics, a function of dependent variables that remains constant
- Conserved sequence, similar or identical sequences of nucleic acids, proteins, protein structures, or polymeric carbohydrates
- Conversation (disambiguation)
- Preservation (disambiguation)
- Sustainable forest management
- Wildlife management, management to conserve wild species and their habitats
