= Conservative Alliance =

Conservative Alliance may refer to:

- Conservative Alliance (Fiji)
- Conservative Alliance (Nicaragua)
