= Richard Feldman (philosopher) =

American philosopher

- Awards: Mellon Fellow, William H. Riker University Award for Graduate Teaching, Romanell-Phi Beta Kappa Professorship

Academic background
- Education: University of Massachusetts (PhD), Cornell University (BA)

Academic work
- Institutions: University of Rochester
- Main interests: epistemology

Richard Feldman is an American philosopher and Emeritus Professor of Philosophy at the University of Rochester. He is known for his works on epistemology. Feldman served as interim president of the University of Rochester from 2018–2019.

== Books ==
- Reason and Argument, Prentice-Hall, 1993; 2nd Edition, 1999.
- Epistemology, Prentice Hall (Foundations of Philosophy Series), 2003.
- Evidentialism, with Earl Conee, Oxford University Press, 2004.
- The Good, The Right, Life and Death, edited with Jason Raibly, Kris McDaniel, and Michael E. Zimmerman, Ashgate, 2006.
- Disagreement, edited with Ted A. Warfield, Oxford University Press, 2010.
