= List of United Kingdom Conservative MPs (2010–2015) =

This is a list of Conservative members of Parliament (MPs) elected to the House of Commons of the United Kingdom for the 55th Parliament of the United Kingdom.

== MPs ==
- Adam Afriyie
- Adam Holloway
- Aidan Burley
- Alan Duncan
- Alan Haselhurst
- Alec Shelbrooke
- Alistair Burt
- Alok Sharma
- Alun Cairns
- Amber Rudd
- Andrea Leadsom
- Andrew Bingham
- Andrew Bridgen
- Andrew Griffiths
- Andrew Jones
- Andrew Lansley
- Andrew Mitchell
- Andrew Murrison
- Andrew Percy
- Andrew Robathan
- Andrew Rosindell
- Andrew Selous
- Andrew Stephenson
- Andrew Turner
- Andrew Tyrie
- Angela Watkinson
- Angie Bray
- Anna Soubry
- Anne Main
- Anne Marie Morris
- Anne McIntosh
- Anne Milton
- Ben Gummer
- Ben Wallace
- Bernard Jenkin
- Bill Cash
- Bill Wiggin
- Bob Blackman
- Bob Neill
- Bob Stewart
- Brandon Lewis
- Brian Binley
- Brooks Newmark
- Caroline Dinenage
- Caroline Nokes
- Caroline Spelman
- Charles Hendry
- Charles Walker
- Charlie Elphicke
- Charlotte Leslie
- Cheryl Gillan
- Chloe Smith
- Chris Grayling
- Chris Heaton-Harris
- Chris Kelly
- Chris Skidmore
- Chris White
- Christopher Chope
- Christopher Pincher
- Claire Perry
- Conor Burns
- Craig Whittaker
- Crispin Blunt
- Damian Collins
- Damian Green
- Damian Hinds
- Dan Byles
- Daniel Kawczynski
- Dan Poulter
- David Amess
- David Burrowes
- David Cameron
- David Davies
- David Davis
- David Evennett
- David Gauke
- David Jones
- David Lidington
- David Morris
- David Mowat
- David Mundell
- David Nuttall
- David Ruffley
- David Rutley
- David Tredinnick
- David Willetts
- Desmond Swayne
- Dominic Grieve
- Dominic Raab
- Douglas Carswell
- Ed Vaizey
- Edward Garnier
- Edward Leigh
- Edward Timpson
- Eleanor Laing
- Eric Ollerenshaw
- Eric Pickles
- Esther McVey
- Fiona Bruce
- Francis Maude
- Gareth Johnson
- Gary Streeter
- Gavin Barwell
- Gavin Williamson
- Geoffrey Clifton-Brown
- Geoffrey Cox
- George Eustice
- George Freeman
- George Hollingbery
- George Osborne
- Gerald Howarth
- Glyn Davies
- Gordon Henderson
- Graham Brady
- Graham Evans
- Graham Stuart
- Grant Shapps
- Greg Clark
- Greg Hands
- Greg Knight
- Gregory Barker
- Guto Bebb
- Guy Opperman
- Harriett Baldwin
- Heather Wheeler
- Helen Grant
- Henry Bellingham
- Henry Smith
- Hugh Robertson
- Hugo Swire
- Iain Duncan Smith
- Iain Stewart
- Ian Liddell-Grainger
- Jack Lopresti
- Jackie Doyle-Price
- Jacob Rees-Mogg
- Jake Berry
- James Arbuthnot
- James Brokenshire
- James Clappison
- James Duddridge
- James Gray
- James Morris
- James Paice
- James Wharton
- Jane Ellison
- Jason McCartney
- Jeremy Hunt
- Jeremy Lefroy
- Jeremy Wright
- Jesse Norman
- Jessica Lee
- Jo Johnson
- John Baron
- John Glen
- John Henry Hayes
- John Howell
- John Penrose
- John Randall
- John Redwood
- John Stanley
- John Stevenson
- John Whittingdale
- Jonathan Djanogly
- Jonathan Evans
- Jonathan Lord
- Julian Brazier
- Julian Lewis
- Julian Smith
- Julian Sturdy
- Justin Tomlinson
- Justine Greening
- Karen Bradley
- Karen Lumley
- Karl McCartney
- Keith Simpson
- Kenneth Clarke
- Kris Hopkins
- Kwasi Kwarteng
- Laura Sandys
- Laurence Robertson
- Lee Scott
- Liam Fox
- Liz Truss
- Lorraine Fullbrook
- Louise Mensch
- Malcolm Rifkind
- Marcus Jones
- Margot James
- Maria Miller
- Mark Field
- Mark Francois
- Mark Garnier
- Mark Harper
- Mark Hoban
- Mark Lancaster
- Mark Menzies
- Mark Pawsey
- Mark Prisk
- Mark Pritchard
- Mark Reckless
- Mark Simmonds
- Mark Spencer
- Martin Vickers
- Mary Macleod
- Matthew Hancock
- Matthew Offord
- Mel Stride
- Michael Ellis
- Michael Fabricant
- Michael Fallon
- Michael Gove
- Mike Freer
- Mike Penning
- Mike Weatherley
- Nadhim Zahawi
- Nadine Dorries
- Neil Carmichael
- Neil Parish
- Nicholas Boles
- Nicholas Soames
- Nick Gibb
- Nick Herbert
- Nick Hurd
- Nick de Bois
- Nicky Morgan
- Nicola Blackwood
- Nigel Adams
- Nigel Evans
- Nigel Mills
- Oliver Colvile
- Oliver Heald
- Oliver Letwin
- Owen Paterson
- Patrick McLoughlin
- Patrick Mercer
- Paul Beresford
- Paul Maynard
- Paul Uppal
- Pauline Latham
- Penny Mordaunt
- Peter Aldous
- Peter Bone
- Peter Bottomley
- Peter Lilley
- Peter Luff
- Peter Tapsell
- Philip Davies
- Philip Dunne
- Philip Hammond
- Philip Hollobone
- Phillip Lee
- Priti Patel
- Rebecca Harris
- Rehman Chishti
- Richard Bacon
- Richard Benyon
- Richard Drax
- Richard Fuller
- Richard Graham
- Richard Harrington
- Richard Ottaway
- Richard Shepherd
- Rob Wilson
- Robert Buckland
- Robert Goodwill
- Robert Halfon
- Robert Jenrick
- Robert Syms
- Robert Walter
- Robin Walker
- Roger Gale
- Rory Stewart
- Sajid Javid
- Sam Gyimah
- Sarah Newton
- Sarah Wollaston
- Shailesh Vara
- Shaun Woodward
- Sheryll Murray
- Simon Burns
- Simon Hart
- Simon Kirby
- Simon Reevell
- Sir George Young
- Steve Barclay
- Stephen Crabb
- Stephen Dorrell
- Stephen Hammond
- Stephen McPartland
- Stephen Metcalfe
- Stephen Mosley
- Stephen O'Brien
- Stephen Phillips
- Steve Baker
- Steve Brine
- Stewart Jackson
- Stuart Andrew
- Theresa May
- Theresa Villiers
- Therese Coffey
- Tim Loughton
- Tim Yeo
- Tobias Ellwood
- Tony Baldry
- Tracey Crouch
- William Hague
- Zac Goldsmith
