= Conservative movement =

Conservative movement may refer to:

- Conservative Movement, a banned political party in Georgia
- Conservatism in the United States, in politics
- Conservatism, a political philosophy
- Conservative Judaism, a Jewish denomination, unrelated to political ideology
