= Conversations Network =

US non-profit corporation

The Conversations Network (2002–2012) was a California non-profit corporation founded by Doug Kaye with the intent of coordinating a global team of volunteer podcasters, even part-time audio/video producers, editors, writers, and audio engineers, to capture and publish lectures, seminars, and other significant events that would otherwise go unrecorded. They were modeled after Kaye's highly successful IT Conversations network.
