= Leader of the Conservative Party (UK) =

Head of the Conservative Party of the United Kingdom

Leader of the Conservative and Unionist Party
- Logo for the Conservative Party

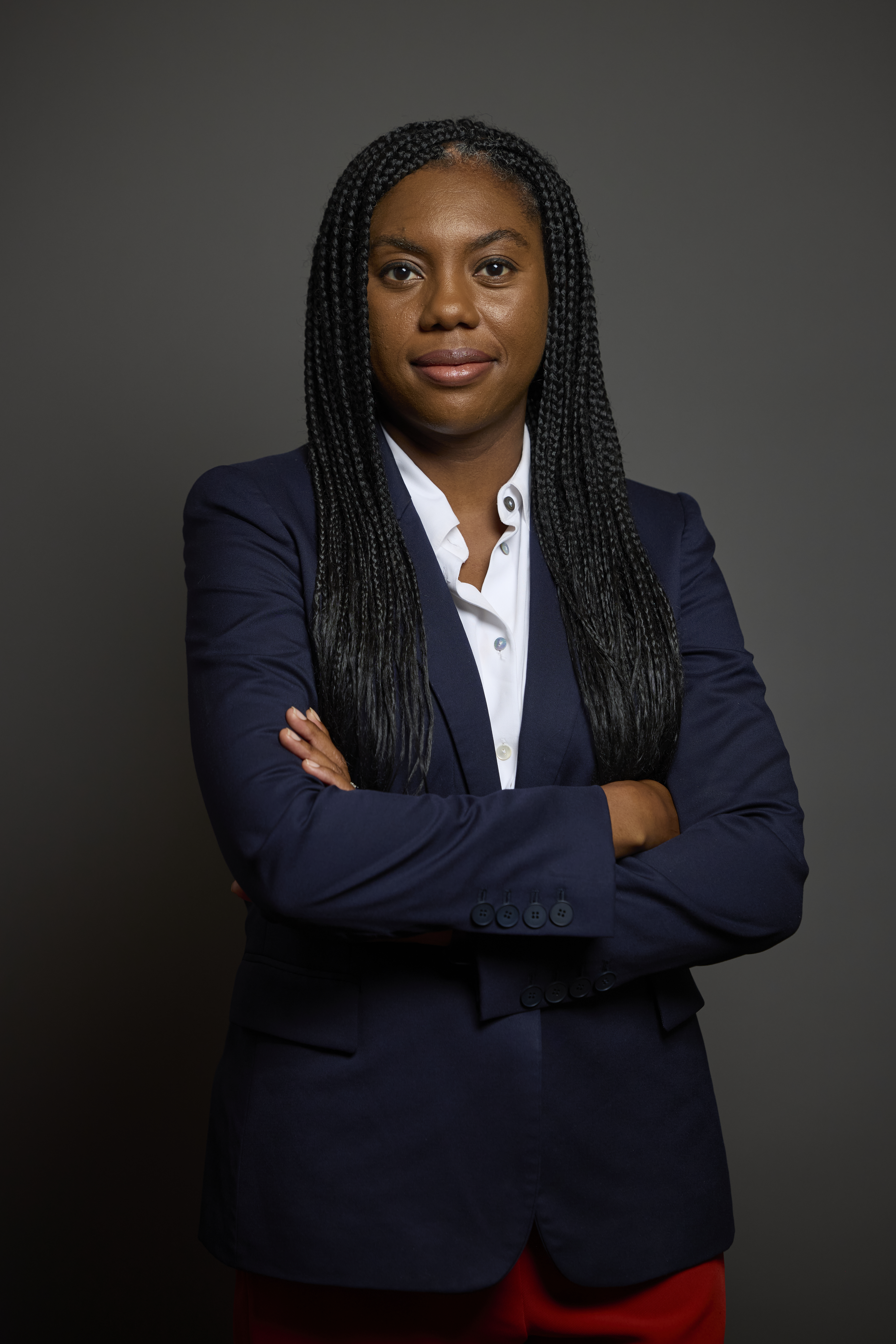
- Incumbent; Kemi Badenoch since 2 November 2024
- Type: Party leader
- Status: Chief executive officer
- Member of: Conservative Party
- Term length: No fixed term
- Inaugural holder: Robert Peel (de facto); Bonar Law (de jure)
- Formation: 1834 (de facto); 1922 (de jure)

The leader of the Conservative Party (officially the leader of the Conservative and Unionist Party) is the highest position within the United Kingdom's Conservative Party. The current holder of the position is Kemi Badenoch, whom the party elected on 2 November 2024 when she outpolled Robert Jenrick.

From the party's formation in 1834 until 1922, the leader of the Conservative Party was not a formal position; instead, separate individuals led the party within each chamber of Parliament, and they were considered equal unless one took precedence over the other, such as when one was serving as prime minister. Following the passage of the Parliament Act 1911, the reduction of power in the House of Lords suggested that the Conservative leader in the House of Commons would become preeminent, but this situation was not formalised until 1922.

Since 1922, leaders of the Conservative Party have been formally elected, even when the party is in opposition. Originally, the party leader was appointed opaquely by other high-ranking members of the party. This process was gradually democratised in the late-20th century; in 1965, the appointment was linked to a vote by party MPs, and in 1998, the process was opened to all party members to decide between the top two candidates selected by parliamentarians.

When the Conservative Party is in opposition, as is the case as of 2025, the leader of the Conservative Party usually acts (as the head of second-largest party) as the Leader of the Opposition, and chairs the shadow cabinet. Concordantly, when the party is in government, the leader usually becomes Prime Minister of the United Kingdom, First Lord of the Treasury, Minister for the Civil Service and Minister for the Union, as well as selecting members of the Cabinet. Four of the party's leaders have been women: Margaret Thatcher, Theresa May, Liz Truss and Kemi Badenoch, all of whom, except Badenoch, have served as prime minister. Rishi Sunak was the first British Indian party leader and prime minister. The only Conservative leaders (excluding temporary acting-leaders) not to contest a general election have been Neville Chamberlain, Iain Duncan Smith and Truss (each of whom resigned before the calling of an election).

== Selection process ==
Under the party's constitution, leaders are elected by serving MPs and party members whose membership started at least three months prior to the closing of a ballot. Candidates must be serving MPs. A former leader who has resigned may not stand in the contest triggered by their departure.

Those who wish to stand must notify the 1922 Committee, a body representing backbench Conservative Party MPs, which has broad powers to set the rules of the leadership race (e.g. the minimum number of nominations that candidates need).

The party's practice is for MPs to eliminate candidates through multiple rounds of voting until two remain, from whom the winner is then chosen by a ballot of party members.

The 1922 Committee's chairman acts as the returning officer for all stages of the leadership election process.

== Overall leaders of the party (1834–1922) ==
Overall leader (birth–death)	Portrait	Constituency or title	Took office	Left office	Government		
Overall leader (birth–death)	Portrait	Constituency or title	Took office	Left office	Party	Prime Minister	Term
Sir Robert Peel (1788–1850)		Tamworth; 2nd Baronet	18 December 1834 (Note: Date of the Tamworth Manifesto.)	29 June 1846	Con	himself	1834–35
Sir Robert Peel (1788–1850)		Tamworth; 2nd Baronet	18 December 1834	29 June 1846	Whig	Melbourne	1835–41
Sir Robert Peel (1788–1850)		Tamworth; 2nd Baronet	18 December 1834	29 June 1846	Con	himself	1841–46
Edward Smith-Stanley (1799–1869)		Baron Stanley (1846–1851)	29 June 1846	27 February 1868	Whig	Russell	1846–52
Edward Smith-Stanley (1799–1869)		14th Earl of Derby (1851–1868)	29 June 1846	27 February 1868	Con	himself	1852
Edward Smith-Stanley (1799–1869)		14th Earl of Derby (1851–1868)	29 June 1846	27 February 1868	Peel	Aberdeen	1852–55
Edward Smith-Stanley (1799–1869)		14th Earl of Derby (1851–1868)	29 June 1846	27 February 1868	Whig	Palmerston	1855–58
Edward Smith-Stanley (1799–1869)		14th Earl of Derby (1851–1868)	29 June 1846	27 February 1868	Con	himself	1858–59
Edward Smith-Stanley (1799–1869)		14th Earl of Derby (1851–1868)	29 June 1846	27 February 1868	Lib	Palmerston	1859–65
Edward Smith-Stanley (1799–1869)		14th Earl of Derby (1851–1868)	29 June 1846	27 February 1868	Lib	Russell	1865–66
Edward Smith-Stanley (1799–1869)		14th Earl of Derby (1851–1868)	29 June 1846	27 February 1868	Con	himself	1866–68
Benjamin Disraeli (1804–1881)		Buckinghamshire (1868–1876)	27 February 1868	19 April 1881 (Note: Died in office)	Con	himself	1868
Benjamin Disraeli (1804–1881)		Buckinghamshire (1868–1876)	27 February 1868	19 April 1881	Lib	Gladstone	1868–74
Benjamin Disraeli (1804–1881)		Buckinghamshire (1868–1876)	27 February 1868	19 April 1881	Con	himself	1874–80
Benjamin Disraeli (1804–1881)		1st Earl of Beaconsfield (1876–1881)	27 February 1868	19 April 1881	Lib	Gladstone	1880–85
vacant	Leader in the House of Lords Robert Gascoyne-Cecil, 3rd Marquess of Salisbury Leader in the House of Commons Stafford Northcote		19 April 1881	23 June 1885	Lib	Gladstone	1880–85
Robert Gascoyne-Cecil (1830–1903)		3rd Marquess of Salisbury	23 June 1885	11 July 1902	Con	himself	1885–86
Robert Gascoyne-Cecil (1830–1903)		3rd Marquess of Salisbury	23 June 1885	11 July 1902	Lib	Gladstone	1886
Robert Gascoyne-Cecil (1830–1903)		3rd Marquess of Salisbury	23 June 1885	11 July 1902	Con	himself	1886–92
Robert Gascoyne-Cecil (1830–1903)		3rd Marquess of Salisbury	23 June 1885	11 July 1902	Lib	Gladstone	1892–94
Robert Gascoyne-Cecil (1830–1903)		3rd Marquess of Salisbury	23 June 1885	11 July 1902	Lib	Rosebery	1894–95
Robert Gascoyne-Cecil (1830–1903)		3rd Marquess of Salisbury	23 June 1885	11 July 1902	Con	himself	1895–1902
Arthur Balfour (1848–1930)		Manchester East (1902–1906)	11 July 1902	13 November 1911	Con	himself	1902–05
Arthur Balfour (1848–1930)		City of London (1906–1911)	11 July 1902	13 November 1911	Lib	C.-Bannerman	1905–08
Arthur Balfour (1848–1930)		City of London (1906–1911)	11 July 1902	13 November 1911	Lib	Asquith	1908–16
vacant	Leader in the House of Lords Henry Petty-Fitzmaurice, 5th Marquess of Lansdowne Leader in the House of Commons Bonar Law		13 November 1911	10 December 1916 (Note: Date on which Law became Leader of the House of Commons.)	Lib	Asquith	1908–16
vacant	Leader in the House of Lords Henry Petty-Fitzmaurice, 5th Marquess of Lansdowne Leader in the House of Commons Bonar Law		13 November 1911	10 December 1916	Lib	Lloyd George	1916–22
Andrew Bonar Law (1858–1923)		Bootle (1916–1918)	10 December 1916	21 March 1921	Lib	Lloyd George	1916–22
Andrew Bonar Law (1858–1923)		Glasgow Central (1918–1921)	10 December 1916	21 March 1921	Lib	Lloyd George	1916–22
vacant	Leader in the House of Lords George Curzon, 1st Marquess Curzon of Kedleston Leader in the House of Commons Austen Chamberlain		21 March 1921	23 October 1922	Lib	Lloyd George	1916–22

== Leaders of the party (1922–present) ==
Leader (birth–death)	Portrait	Constituency or title	Took office	Left office	Government		
Leader (birth–death)	Portrait	Constituency or title	Took office	Left office	Party	Prime Minister	Term
Andrew Bonar Law (1858–1923)		Glasgow Central	23 October 1922 (Party meeting)	28 May 1923	Con	himself	1922–23
Stanley Baldwin (1867–1947)		Bewdley	28 May 1923 (Party meeting)	31 May 1937	Con	himself	1923–24
Stanley Baldwin (1867–1947)		Bewdley	28 May 1923 (Party meeting)	31 May 1937	Lab	MacDonald	1924
Stanley Baldwin (1867–1947)		Bewdley	28 May 1923 (Party meeting)	31 May 1937	Con	himself	1924–29
Stanley Baldwin (1867–1947)		Bewdley	28 May 1923 (Party meeting)	31 May 1937	Lab	MacDonald	1929–35
Stanley Baldwin (1867–1947)		Bewdley	28 May 1923 (Party meeting)	31 May 1937	NLab	MacDonald	1929–35
Stanley Baldwin (1867–1947)		Bewdley	28 May 1923 (Party meeting)	31 May 1937	Con	himself	1935–37
Neville Chamberlain (1869–1940)		Birmingham Edgbaston	31 May 1937 (Party meeting)	9 October 1940	Con	himself	1937–40
Neville Chamberlain (1869–1940)		Birmingham Edgbaston	31 May 1937 (Party meeting)	9 October 1940	Con	Churchill	1940
Winston Churchill (1874–1965)		Epping (1940–1945)	9 October 1940 (Party meeting)	21 April 1955	Con	himself	1940–45
Winston Churchill (1874–1965)		Woodford (1945–1955)	9 October 1940 (Party meeting)	21 April 1955	Lab	Attlee	1945–51
Winston Churchill (1874–1965)		Woodford (1945–1955)	9 October 1940 (Party meeting)	21 April 1955	Con	himself	1951–55
Anthony Eden (1897–1977)		Warwick and Leamington	21 April 1955 (Party meeting)	22 January 1957	Con	himself	1955–57
Harold Macmillan (1894–1986)		Bromley	22 January 1957 (Party meeting)	11 November 1963	Con	himself	1957–63
Alec Douglas-Home (1903–1995)		14th Earl of Home (1963)	11 November 1963 (Party meeting)	27 July 1965	Con	himself	1963–64
Alec Douglas-Home (1903–1995)		Kinross and Western Perthshire (1963–1965)	11 November 1963 (Party meeting)	27 July 1965	Con	himself	1963–64
Alec Douglas-Home (1903–1995)		Kinross and Western Perthshire (1963–1965)	11 November 1963 (Party meeting)	27 July 1965	Lab	Wilson	1964–70
Edward Heath (1916–2005)		Bexley (1965 – 1974)	27 July 1965 (Elected)	11 February 1975	Lab	Wilson	1964–70
Edward Heath (1916–2005)		Bexley (1965 – 1974)	27 July 1965 (Elected)	11 February 1975	Con	himself	1970–74
Edward Heath (1916–2005)		Sidcup (1974–1975)	27 July 1965 (Elected)	11 February 1975	Con	himself	1970–74
Edward Heath (1916–2005)		Sidcup (1974–1975)	27 July 1965 (Elected)	11 February 1975	Lab	Wilson	1974–76
Margaret Thatcher (1925–2013)		Finchley	11 February 1975 (Elected)	27 November 1990	Lab	Wilson	1974–76
Margaret Thatcher (1925–2013)		Finchley	11 February 1975 (Elected)	27 November 1990	Lab	Callaghan	1976–79
Margaret Thatcher (1925–2013)		Finchley	11 February 1975 (Elected)	27 November 1990	Con	herself	1979–90
John Major (b. 1943)		Huntingdon	27 November 1990 (Opponents withdrew)	19 June 1997			
John Major (b. 1943)		Huntingdon	27 November 1990 (Opponents withdrew)	19 June 1997	Con	himself	1990–97
John Major (b. 1943)		Huntingdon	27 November 1990 (Opponents withdrew)	19 June 1997	Lab	Blair	1997–2007
William Hague (b. 1961)		Richmond (Yorks)	19 June 1997 (Elected)	13 September 2001	Lab	Blair	1997–2007
Iain Duncan Smith (b. 1954)		Chingford and Woodford Green	13 September 2001 (Elected)	6 November 2003	Lab	Blair	1997–2007
Michael Howard (b. 1941)		Folkestone and Hythe	6 November 2003 (Unopposed)	7 October 2005	Lab	Blair	1997–2007
David Cameron (b. 1966); Tenure		Witney	6 December 2005 (Elected)	11 July 2016	Lab	Blair	1997–2007
David Cameron (b. 1966); Tenure		Witney	6 December 2005 (Elected)	11 July 2016	Lab	Brown	2007–10
David Cameron (b. 1966); Tenure		Witney	6 December 2005 (Elected)	11 July 2016	Coal	himself	2010–15
David Cameron (b. 1966); Tenure		Witney	6 December 2005 (Elected)	11 July 2016	Con	himself	2015–16
Theresa May (b. 1956); Tenure		Maidenhead	11 July 2016 (Opponents withdrew)	7 June 2019	Con	herself	2016–19
Theresa May (b. 1956); Tenure		Maidenhead	7 June 2019 (Acting)	23 July 2019	Con	herself	2016–19
Boris Johnson (b. 1964); Tenure		Uxbridge and South Ruislip	23 July 2019 (Elected)	5 September 2022	Con	himself	2019–22
Liz Truss (b. 1975); Tenure		South West Norfolk	5 September 2022 (Elected)	24 October 2022	Con	herself	2022
Rishi Sunak (b. 1980); Tenure		Richmond (Yorks) (2015–2024)	24 October 2022 (Unopposed)	24 July 2024	Con	himself	2022–24
Rishi Sunak (b. 1980); Tenure		Richmond and Northallerton (2024)	24 July 2024 (Acting)	2 November 2024	Lab	Starmer	2024–2026
Kemi Badenoch (b. 1980); Tenure		North West Essex	2 November 2024 (Elected)	Incumbent	Lab	Starmer	2024–2026
Kemi Badenoch (b. 1980); Tenure		North West Essex	2 November 2024 (Elected)	Incumbent	Lab	Burnham	2026-present

== Houses of Lords and Commons leaders ==
=== Leaders in the House of Commons (1834–present) ===
Those asterisked were considered the overall leader of the party.

- Sir Robert Peel: 18 December 1834 – 1846*
- Lord George Bentinck: 1846–1847
- The Marquess of Granby: 9 February 1848 – 4 March 1848, elected at a party meeting
- None: 1848–1849
- Jointly Benjamin Disraeli, the Marquess of Granby, and John Charles Herries: 1849–1852, (Note: Granby resigned "either in the end of December [1851] or on one of the first days of January [1852]".) elected at a party meeting
- Benjamin Disraeli: 1852 – 21 August 1876 (overall leader from 27 February 1868)
- Sir Stafford Northcote: 21 August 1876 – 24 June 1885, appointed by Prime Minister Beaconsfield
- Sir Michael Hicks Beach: 24 June 1885 – 3 August 1886, appointed by Prime Minister Salisbury
- Lord Randolph Churchill: 3 August 1886 – 14 January 1887, appointed by Prime Minister Salisbury
- William Henry Smith: 17 January 1887 – 6 October 1891, appointed by Prime Minister Salisbury
- Arthur Balfour: 1891 – 13 January 1906, (Note: Date on which Balfour failed to be elected in Manchester East.) appointed by Prime Minister Salisbury (overall leader from 1902)
- Joseph Chamberlain: 1906
- Arthur Balfour: 1906 – 13 November 1911*
- Bonar Law: 13 November 1911 – 21 March 1921, elected at a party meeting (overall leader from 1916)
- Austen Chamberlain: 21 March 1921 – 23 October 1922, elected at a party meeting

From 1922, the role of the Conservative Party Leader in the House of Commons goes to the newly created role of the Leader of the Conservative Party.

- Bonar Law: 23 October 1922 – 28 May 1923*
- Stanley Baldwin: 28 May 1923 – 31 May 1937*
- Neville Chamberlain: 31 May 1937 – 9 October 1940*
- Winston Churchill: 9 October 1940 – 21 April 1955*
- Sir Anthony Eden: 21 April 1955 – 22 January 1957*
- Harold Macmillan: 22 January 1957 – 11 November 1963*
- Sir Alec Douglas-Home: 11 November 1963 – 2 August 1965*
- Edward Heath: 2 August 1965 – 11 February 1975*
- Margaret Thatcher: 11 February 1975 – 28 November 1990*
- John Major: 28 November 1990 – 19 June 1997*
- William Hague: 19 June 1997 – 13 September 2001*
- Iain Duncan Smith: 13 September 2001 – 6 November 2003*
- Michael Howard: 6 November 2003 – 6 December 2005*
- David Cameron: 6 December 2005 – 11 July 2016*
- Theresa May: 11 July 2016 – 24 July 2019*
- Boris Johnson: 24 July 2019 – 5 September 2022*
- Liz Truss: 5 September 2022 – 24 October 2022*
- Rishi Sunak: 24 October 2022 – 2 November 2024*
- Kemi Badenoch: 2 November 2024 – present*

== Elections of Conservative leaders by party meeting ==
=== House of Commons ===
#	Date of meeting	Name of leader elected	Category attending meeting	Location of meeting	Chair	Proposer	Seconder	Refs
1	9 February 1848	The Marquess of Granby	Protectionist commoners	Residence of George Bankes	—N/a	—N/a	—N/a	
2	1 February 1849	Benjamin Disraeli	—N/a	Residence of the Lord Stanley of Bickerstaffe	—N/a	—N/a	—N/a	
2	1 February 1849	The Marquess of Granby	—N/a	Residence of the Lord Stanley of Bickerstaffe	—N/a	—N/a	—N/a	
2	1 February 1849	John Charles Herries	—N/a	Residence of the Lord Stanley of Bickerstaffe	—N/a	—N/a	—N/a	
3	13 November 1911	Bonar Law	Unionist Members of Parliament	Carlton Club, Pall Mall	Henry Chaplin, senior Privy Councillor on the Unionist benches (appointed 1885)	Walter Long	Austen Chamberlain	
4	21 March 1921	Austen Chamberlain	Unionist Members of Parliament	Carlton Club, Pall Mall	Lord Edmund Talbot, Conservative Chief Whip	Captain Ernest George Pretyman	Sir Edward Coates: "a back bencher and one of the rank and file"	
5	23 October 1922	Bonar Law	Unionist peers, MPs, and candidates	Hotel Cecil, The Strand	The Marquess Curzon of Kedleston, Leader of the House of Lords	The Marquess Curzon of Kedleston	Stanley Baldwin: "chosen ... to be the spokesman for the House of Commons"	
6	28 May 1923	Stanley Baldwin	"Conservative Party"	Hotel Cecil, The Strand	The Marquess Curzon of Kedleston, Leader of the House of Lords	The Earl of Derby	Captain Ernest George Pretyman: "a member of the House of Commons who [had] been a colleague in that House of Mr Bonar Law for something over 25 years"	
7	31 May 1937	Neville Chamberlain	"peers and MPs who receive the Conservative whip, ... prospective candidates who have been adopted by constituency associations, and ... members of the executive committee of the National Union of Conservative and Unionist associations from England and Wales, Scotland and Northern Ireland."	Caxton Hall, Caxton Street	The Viscount Halifax, Leader of the House of Lords	The Earl of Derby	Winston Churchill (Privy Councillor since 1907)	
8	9 October 1940	Winston Churchill	"Peers and MPs who receive the Conservative whip, ... prospective candidates who have been adopted by constituency associations, and ... members of the Executive Committee of the National Union of Conservative and Unionist Associations from England and Wales, Scotland and Northern Ireland."	London	The Viscount Halifax, Leader of the House of Lords	The Viscount Halifax	Sir George Courthope: "one of the senior back benchers of the party"	
9	21 April 1955	Sir Anthony Eden	"Conservative and National Liberal members of the two Houses of Parliament, Conservative and National Liberal parliamentary candidates and members of the executive committee of the National Union of Conservative and Unionist Associations"	Church House, Dean's Yard, Westminster	The Marquess of Salisbury, Leader of the House of Lords	The Marquess of Salisbury	Rab Butler (Privy Councillor since 1939)	
10	22 January 1957	Harold Macmillan	"Conservative and Unionist members of the House of Lords and the House of Commons, ... prospective parliamentary candidates and ... members of the executive committee of the National Union of Conservative and Unionist Associations. National Liberal members of both Houses of Parliament and adopted prospective candidates were also present"	—N/a	The Marquess of Salisbury, Leader of the House of Lords	The Marquess of Salisbury	Rab Butler (Privy Councillor since 1939)	
11	11 November 1963	Alec Douglas-Home	"members of both Houses of Parliament taking the Conservative whip, prospective candidates who [had] been adopted by constituency associations, members of the executive of the mass party, and National Liberal MPs and adopted prospective candidates"	Church House, Dean's Yard, Westminster	The Lord Carrington, Leader of the House of Lords	The Lord Carrington	Geoffrey Lloyd: "the senior Conservative Privy Councillor in the Commons next in line to Sir Winston Churchill" (appointed 1943)	

=== House of Lords ===
#	Date of meeting	Name of leader elected	Category attending meeting	Location of meeting	Chair	Proposer	Seconder	Notes
1	9 March 1846	The Lord Stanley of Bickerstaffe	Peers	Residence of the Duke of Richmond	The Earl of Eglinton	—N/a	—N/a	
2	15 February 1869	The Earl Cairns	23 peers	—N/a	The Earl of Malmesbury	The Earl of Malmesbury	—N/a	
3	26 February 1870	The Duke of Richmond	Peers	Carlton Club	—N/a	The Marquess of Salisbury	The Earl of Derby	
4	9 May 1881	The Marquess of Salisbury	Conservative members of the House of Lords	Residence of the Marquess of Abergavenny	The Marquess of Abergavenny	The Duke of Richmond	The Earl Cairns	

== Deputy Leaders of the Conservative Party ==
Deputy Leader of the Conservative Party is sometimes an official title of a senior Conservative politician.

Some are given this title officially by the party, such as Peter Lilley, while others are given the title as an unofficial description by the media, such as William Hague. The first politician to hold the office as such was Reginald Maudling, appointed by Edward Heath in 1965. Distinct from being "second-in-command", there is formally no current position of deputy party leader in the party's hierarchy.

The term has sometimes been mistakenly used to refer to the party's deputy chair.

=== List of deputy leaders ===
Name	Portrait	Term began	Term ended	Concurrent office(s)	Leader
Reginald Maudling		4 August 1965	18 July 1972	Deputy Leader of the Opposition (1965–1970); Shadow Foreign Secretary (1965); Shadow Defence Secretary (1968–1969); Home Secretary (1970–1972)	Edward Heath
Not in use from 1972 to 1975
The Viscount Whitelaw		12 February 1975	7 August 1991	Deputy Leader of the Opposition (1975–1979); Shadow Home Secretary (1976–1979); Home Secretary (1979–1983); Leader of the House of Lords (1983–1988)	Margaret Thatcher
The Viscount Whitelaw		12 February 1975	7 August 1991	Deputy Leader of the Opposition (1975–1979); Shadow Home Secretary (1976–1979); Home Secretary (1979–1983); Leader of the House of Lords (1983–1988)	John Major
Not in use from 1991 to 1998
Peter Lilley		2 June 1998	15 June 1999	Deputy Leader of the Opposition	William Hague
Not in use from 1999 to 2001
Michael Ancram		18 September 2001	6 December 2005	Deputy Leader of the Opposition; Shadow Foreign Secretary (2001–2005); Shadow Defence Secretary (2005)	Iain Duncan Smith
Michael Ancram		18 September 2001	6 December 2005	Deputy Leader of the Opposition; Shadow Foreign Secretary (2001–2005); Shadow Defence Secretary (2005)	Michael Howard
Not in use from 2005 to 2026
Alex Burghart		1 September 2026	Incumbent	Deputy Leader of the Opposition; Shadow Chancellor of the Duchy of Lancaster; Shadow Secretary of State for Northern Ireland	Kemi Badenoch

== See also ==
- 1922 Committee
- Leader of the Labour Party (UK)
- Leader of the Liberal Democrats
