= Conservative Party leadership election =

Conservative Party leadership election may refer to:

== Canada ==
Progressive Conservative Associations

- Progressive Conservative Association of Alberta leadership elections
- Progressive Conservative Association of Nova Scotia leadership elections

Progressive Conservative Party

- 1927 Conservative leadership convention
- 1938 National Conservative leadership convention
- 1942 Progressive Conservative leadership convention
- 1948 Progressive Conservative leadership convention
- 1956 Progressive Conservative leadership convention
- 1995 Progressive Conservative leadership convention
- 1967 Progressive Conservative leadership election
- 1976 Progressive Conservative leadership election
- 1983 Progressive Conservative leadership election
- 1993 Progressive Conservative leadership election
- 1998 Progressive Conservative leadership election
- 2003 Progressive Conservative leadership election

Progressive Conservative Party Branches

- Progressive Conservative Party of Saskatchewan leadership elections
- Progressive Conservative Party of Manitoba leadership elections
- Progressive Conservative Party of New Brunswick leadership elections
- Progressive Conservative Party of Newfoundland and Labrador leadership elections
- Progressive Conservative Party of Ontario leadership elections
- Progressive Conservative Party of Prince Edward Island leadership elections

Conservative Party of Canada

- 2004 Conservative Party of Canada leadership election
- 2017 Conservative Party of Canada leadership election
- 2020 Conservative Party of Canada leadership election
- 2022 Conservative Party of Canada leadership election

=== Quebec ===
- Conservative Party of Quebec (historical) leadership elections

== United Kingdom ==
- 1965 Conservative Party leadership election
- 1975 Conservative Party leadership election
- 1989 Conservative Party leadership election
- 1990 Conservative Party leadership election
- 1995 Conservative Party leadership election
- 1997 Conservative Party leadership election
- 2001 Conservative Party leadership election
- 2003 Conservative Party leadership election
- 2005 Conservative Party leadership election
- 2016 Conservative Party leadership election
- 2019 Conservative Party leadership election
- July–September 2022 Conservative Party leadership election
- October 2022 Conservative Party leadership election
- 2024 Conservative Party leadership election

=== Scotland ===
- 1998 Scottish Conservative Party leadership election
- 2005 Scottish Conservative Party leadership election
- 2011 Scottish Conservative Party leadership election
- February 2020 Scottish Conservative Party leadership election
- August 2020 Scottish Conservative Party leadership election
- 2024 Scottish Conservatives leadership election

=== Wales ===
- 1999 Welsh Conservatives leadership election
- 2011 Welsh Conservatives leadership election
- 2018 Welsh Conservatives leadership election
- 2021 Welsh Conservatives leadership election

== See also ==
- Conservative government
