= Carlaw shadow cabinet =

Scottish opposition cabinet in 2020

Carlaw Shadow Cabinet
- Shadow Cabinet of Scotland
- February 2020 – August 2020
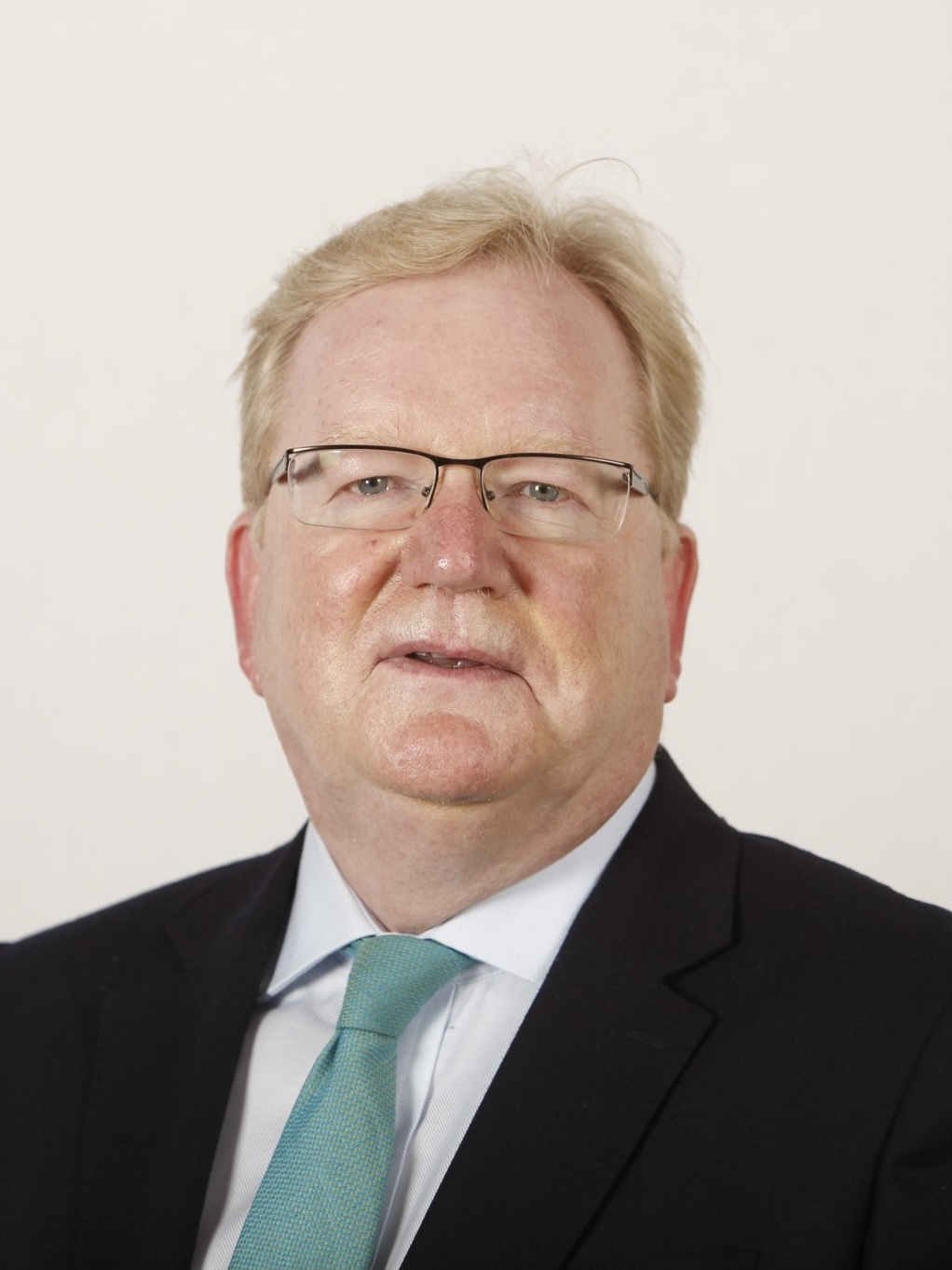
- Date formed: 18 February 2020
- Date dissolved: 11 August 2020

People and organisations
- Leader of the Opposition: Jackson Carlaw
- Member party: Scottish Conservatives

History
- Legislature term: 5th Scottish Parliament
- Predecessor: Shadow Cabinet of Ruth Davidson
- Successor: Shadow Cabinet of Douglas Ross

While there is no Official Opposition in Holyrood, Jackson Carlaw, as leader of the largest party not in government, acts as the Leader of the Opposition. Carlaw was elected leader of the Scottish Conservatives in February 2020 and resigned in July 2020, and was succeeded by Douglas Ross.

Carlaw had already served as acting leader of the Scottish Conservatives from August 2019 until his election win in February, following Ruth Davidson's resignation. After he was appointed leader, he appointed members to his shadow cabinet. Carlaw's cabinet dissolved on 11 August 2020 by the Shadow Cabinet of Douglas Ross.

== Shadow Cabinet ==
Carlaw Shadow Cabinet
| Portfolio | Officeholder | Portrait | Term |
|---|---|---|---|
| Leader of the Scottish Conservatives | Jackson Carlaw MSP | | Feb. 2020 – Aug. 2020 |
| Deputy Leader of the Scottish Conservatives | Liam Kerr MSP | | Feb. 2020 – Aug. 2020 |
| Shadow Cabinet Secretary for Justice | Liam Kerr MSP | | Feb. 2020 – Aug. 2020 |
| Deputy Leader of the Scottish Conservatives | Annie Wells MSP | | Feb. 2020 – Aug. 2020 |
| Shadow Cabinet Secretary for Environment, Climate Change and Land Reform | Annie Wells MSP | | Feb. 2020 – Aug. 2020 |
| Shadow Cabinet Secretary for Finance | Donald Cameron MSP | | Feb. 2020 – Aug. 2020 |
| Shadow Cabinet Secretary for Constitution and External Affairs | Murdo Fraser MSP | | Feb. 2020 – Aug. 2020 |
| Shadow Cabinet Secretary for Strategy | Adam Tomkins MSP | | Feb. 2020 – Aug. 2020 |
| Shadow Cabinet Secretary for Health | Miles Briggs MSP | | Feb. 2020 – Aug. 2020 |
| Shadow Cabinet Secretary for Education | Jamie Greene MSP | | Feb. 2020 – Aug. 2020 |
| Shadow Cabinet Secretary for Economy, Fair Work and Culture | Maurice Golden MSP | | Feb. 2020 – Aug. 2020 |
| Shadow Cabinet Secretary for Business, Infrastructure and Transport | Dean Lockhart MSP | | Feb. 2020 – Aug. 2020 |
| Shadow Cabinet Secretary for Rural Economy and Tourism | Rachael Hamilton MSP | | Feb. 2020 – Aug. 2020 |
| Shadow Cabinet Secretary for Housing, Communities and Social Security | Graham Simpson MSP | | Feb. 2020 – Aug. 2020 |
| Scottish Conservative Chief Whip | Liz Smith MSP | | Feb. 2020 – Aug. 2020 |
