= February 2020 Scottish Conservatives leadership election =

Scottish political party election

February 2020 Scottish Conservative Party leadership election
- 1–13 February 2020
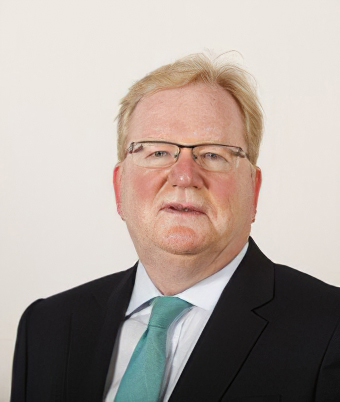

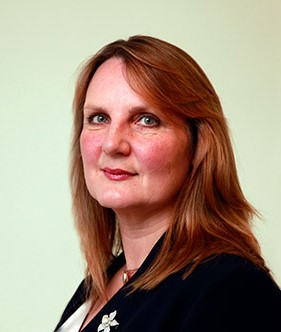
Candidate	Jackson Carlaw	Michelle Ballantyne
Delegate votes	4,917	1,581
Percentage	75.7%	24.3%
Leader before election
Ruth Davidson
Jackson Carlaw (Acting)
Elected Leader
Jackson Carlaw

The February 2020 Scottish Conservative Party leadership election was the fourth internal party election to elect the next leader of the Scottish Conservatives, part of the British Conservative Party and the second-largest political party in the devolved Scottish Parliament. Ruth Davidson, who won the previous leadership election in 2011, resigned on 29 August 2019. Two candidates contested the election: Jackson Carlaw MSP (Member of the Scottish Parliament), who served as the Scottish Conservatives' interim leader, and Michelle Ballantyne MSP. Carlaw was seen as the favourite in the contest, and won the endorsement of most of the party's MSPs and MPs (Members of Parliament). Carlaw won the election on 14 February 2020, winning more than three-quarters of the votes of party members.

The leadership election was expected to take place in late 2019, but was delayed due to the 2019 United Kingdom general election. Carlaw represented the Conservatives in the two Scottish televised debates during the election campaign.

== Background ==
On 28 August 2019, the Scottish Sun reported that Ruth Davidson was 'on the verge of resigning' due to disagreements with the leader of the Conservative Party, Boris Johnson, and the pressure with motherhood after giving birth to her first child in October 2018. On the next day, Ruth Davidson confirmed her resignation and said she would remain as an MSP until 2021. At the same time, the deputy leader of the Scottish Conservatives, Jackson Carlaw, who previously stood in for Davidson during her maternity leave, was announced as the interim leader of the party ahead of the leadership election.

On 1 September, Adam Tomkins proposed that if he was ever to stand and be elected as leader, he might propose a new party to replace the Scottish Conservatives to create a pro-union alliance party made up of Conservative, Labour and Liberal Democrats MSPs. However, he said that if Murdo Fraser stood, he wouldn't.

The Herald reported that a permanent leader might not be in office until 2020, citing divisions on Brexit and the possibility of an early UK general election. The UK Parliament subsequently legislated for a general election to be held on 12 December 2019, which delayed the Scottish Conservative leadership election until early 2020. Carlaw served as interim leader during the election campaign, and represented the party during both of the Scottish television debates. In the 2019 general election the Conservatives won six seats in Scotland, losing seven of the 13 they had won in 2017.

This loss in Scotland contrasted with a strong performance in England and Wales, which meant that the party won an overall majority of 80. There was a growing feeling that following what had been a surprisingly good result for the Conservative Party, Jackson Carlaw would be elected leader with no opposition.

Many senior Conservatives felt that with Holyrood elections coming up it would be better to avoid a contest and focus on uniting against the SNP.

== Candidates ==
Candidate	Born	Political office	Campaign	Ref.
Michelle Ballantyne	28 November 1962 (age 63)	Social security spokesperson (since 2018); MSP for South Scotland (since 2017)	Campaign	
Jackson Carlaw	12 April 1959 (age 67)	Acting leader of the Scottish Conservatives (since 2019); MSP for Eastwood (since 2016); MSP for West Scotland (2007–2016)	Campaign	

=== Declined ===
- Miles Briggs, health spokesperson (endorsed Carlaw)
- Liam Kerr, deputy leader and justice spokesperson (endorsed Carlaw)
- Murdo Fraser, finance spokesperson (endorsed Carlaw)
- Dean Lockhart, economy spokesperson (endorsed Carlaw)
- Liz Smith, education spokesperson (endorsed Carlaw)
- Adam Tomkins, constitutional spokesperson (endorsed Carlaw)
- Brian Whittle, MSP for South Scotland (endorsed Carlaw)
- Annie Wells, equalities spokesperson (endorsed Carlaw)
- Donald Cameron, rural economy spokesperson (endorsed Carlaw)
- Maurice Golden, chief whip (endorsed Carlaw)
- Jamie Greene, transport spokesperson (endorsed Carlaw)
- Alister Jack, Secretary of State for Scotland (to remain neutral)
- Douglas Ross, Member of Parliament for Moray (endorsed Carlaw)

== Campaign ==
Michelle Ballantyne announced her candidacy and was soon followed by Jackson Carlaw. Carlaw gained support from all his frontbenchers and many of his backbenchers plus former backbencher and former MP Ross Thomson.

Jackson Carlaw launched his campaign on 15 January 2020, focusing on the forthcoming Scottish Parliament elections in 2021 and the next council elections in 2022, Jackson Carlaw built his campaign on wanting to spend the next eighteen months leading up to the elections at the Scottish Parliament to take down Nicola Sturgeon and the Scottish National Party in the process. Carlaw nominated Euan Waddell as his campaign manager, with MSPs Rachael Hamilton MSP and Liam Kerr MSP being co-chairs of his campaign.

The first hustings of the campaign took place in Glasgow on 24 January 2020.

=== Hustings ===
Date	Location
24 January 2020	Glasgow
25 January 2020	Moffat
26 January 2020	Perth
26 January 2020	Edinburgh
1 February 2020	Aberdeen
2 February 2020	Inverness

== Result ==
Scottish Conservative Party leadership election, 2020
Party	Candidate	FPv%	Count
Party	Candidate	FPv%	1
Conservative	Jackson Carlaw	75.7	✓ 4,917
Conservative	Michelle Ballantyne	24.3	1,581

Results of the 2020 Scottish Conservative leadership election
Jackson Carlaw	75.7%
Michelle Ballantyne	24.3%

== Endorsements ==
=== Jackson Carlaw ===
- Miles Briggs, health spokesperson
- Murdo Fraser, finance spokesperson
- Rachael Hamilton, MSP for Ettrick, Roxburgh and Berwickshire
- Liam Kerr, deputy leader and justice spokesperson
- Dean Lockhart, economy spokesperson
- Liz Smith, education spokesperson
- Adam Tomkins, constitutional spokesperson
- Brian Whittle, MSP for South Scotland
- Maurice Golden, MSP for West Scotland
- Andrew Bowie, MP For West Aberdeenshire and Kincardine
- Donald Cameron, MSP for Highlands and Islands
- Finlay Carson, MSP for Galloway and West Dumfries
- Graham Simpson, MSP for Central Scotland
- Ian Duncan, Former MEP, Member of the House of Lords and UK Government Minister Climate Change and Northern Ireland

=== Michelle Ballantyne ===
- Ross Thomson, Former Conservative MP

== Timeline of events ==
=== 2019 ===
- 29 August – Ruth Davidson announces her resignation as Scottish Conservative leader
- 1 September – Adam Tomkins states that he would not stand for leadership if Murdo Fraser stands
- 8 September – A new campaign, Scottish Conservatives Together, is set up in response to oppose an independent Scottish Conservative party. The campaign has hinted the possibility of Murdo Fraser or Adam Tomkins running for leader as they have advocated for a split in the party
- 14 October – The Scottish Conservatives begin the process of selecting a permanent leader
- 12 December – The Scottish Conservatives stand in the 2019 general election under the leadership of Jackson Carlaw with the election resulting in the party losing seven out of the thirteen seats won in the 2017 election under the leadership of Ruth Davidson

=== 2020 ===
- 3 January – Michelle Ballantyne announces that she will be a candidate in the contest if she obtains the 100 nominations required.
- 5 January – Jackson Carlaw publishes an article in the Sunday Times appearing to suggest his intention to run for leadership.
- 5 January – Annie Wells rules out running for leader
- 6 January – Jackson Carlaw officially announces his intention to run for leadership of the party
- 14 January – Michelle Ballantyne is confirmed as a candidate after reaching the required 100 nominations
- 15 January – Jackson Carlaw launches his campaign at Dynamic Earth in Edinburgh
- 17 January – Nominations close. The Scottish Conservatives reveal that the leader will be announced on 14 February. Both Jackson Carlaw and Michelle Ballantyne received enough nominations to pass through to the voting round
- 20 January – Michelle Ballantyne launches her campaign with an emphasis of winning over the working-class voters
- 24 January – First hustings for the election take place in Glasgow
- 25 January – Second husting for the election takes place in Moffat
- 26 January – Third and fourth hustings for the election take place in Edinburgh and Perth
- 1 February – Fifth husting for the election takes place in Aberdeen
- 1 February – Ballot open up until 13 February, the day before the leadership election ends
- 2 February – Sixth and final husting takes place in Inverness
- 14 February – Jackson Carlaw wins election and defeats Michelle Ballantyne by 4,917 votes to 1,581 votes.

== Subsequent events ==
On 30 July 2020, Carlaw announced his resignation as leader of the Scottish Conservatives with immediate effect, saying it had become clear to him he was not the best person to make the case for Scotland remaining part of the United Kingdom. Carlaw had represented the Conservatives at the week's First Minister's Questions in the Scottish Parliament shortly before announcing his resignation.

== See also ==
- August 2020 Scottish Conservative Party leadership election
- 2019 Conservative Party leadership election
- 2019 United Kingdom general election
