= Davidson shadow cabinet =

Davidson Shadow Cabinet
- Shadow Cabinet of Scotland
- 2016 – 2019
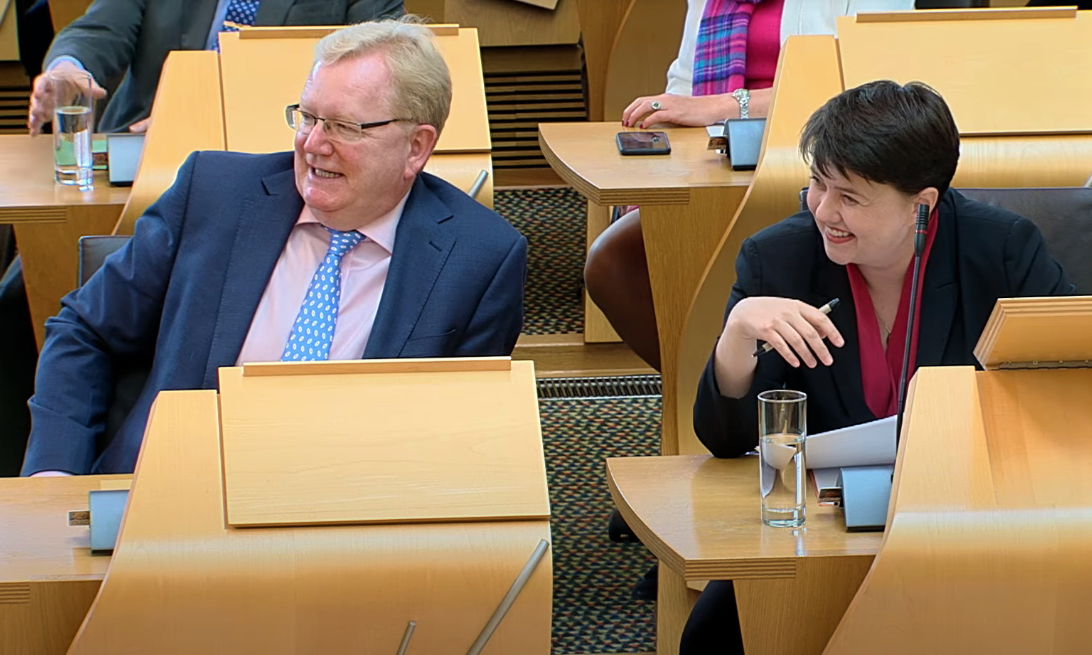
- Date formed: 5 May 2016
- Date dissolved: 29 August 2019

People and organisations
- Leader of the Opposition: Ruth Davidson (2016–2018); Jackson Carlaw (2018–2019) (Note: Jackson Carlaw served as acting Leader of the Opposition while Davidson was on leave.); Ruth Davidson (2019)
- Member party: Scottish Conservatives

History
- Election: 2016
- Legislature term: 5th Scottish Parliament
- Predecessor: Shadow Cabinet of Kezia Dugdale
- Successor: Shadow Cabinet of Jackson Carlaw

While there is no Official Opposition in Holyrood, Ruth Davidson, as leader of the largest party not in government, acts as the Leader of the Opposition. She formed her shadow cabinet following the 2016 Scottish Parliament election, where the Scottish Conservatives replaced Scottish Labour as the largest non-governing party.

== History ==
Davidson was elected Leader of the Scottish Conservative Party in the 2011 leadership election. She led the secondary opposition frontbench from 2011 until the 2016 Scottish Parliament election. In the election, the Scottish Conservatives replaced the Scottish Labour as the largest party not in government.

In 2018, Davidson and her partner, Jen Wilson, announced they were expecting a baby. From 15 September 2018 to 3 May 2019, she went on leave and her opposition cabinet was led by Jackson Carlaw.

In 2019, Davidson resigned as Conservative leader and her shadow cabinet dissolved.

== Shadow Cabinet ==
Davidson Shadow Cabinet
Portfolio	Officeholder	Term
Leader	Ruth Davidson	2016–2020
Deputy Leader	Jackson Carlaw	2016–2020
Europe and External Affairs	Jackson Carlaw	2016–2020
Culture and Tourism	Jackson Carlaw	2016–2017
Culture and Tourism	Rachael Hamilton	2017–2020
Finance	Murdo Fraser	2016–2020
Economy, Jobs and Fair Work	Dean Lockhart	2016–2020
Health and Sport	Donald Cameron	2016–2017
Health and Sport	Miles Briggs	2017–2020
Education and Skills	Liz Smith	2016–2020
Constitution	Adam Tomkins	2016–2020
Social Security	Adam Tomkins	2016–2018
Social Security	Michelle Ballantyne	2018–2020
Justice	Douglas Ross	2016–2017
Justice	Liam Kerr	2017–2020
Rural Economy and Connectivity	Peter Chapman	2016–2020
Environment, Climate Change and Land Reform	Maurice Golden	2016–2017
Environment, Climate Change and Land Reform	Donald Cameron	2017–2020
Chief Whip	John Lamont	2016–2017
Chief Whip	Maurice Golden	2017–2020
