= Ross shadow cabinet =

Ross Shadow Cabinet
- Shadow Cabinet of Scotland
- 2020 – 2024
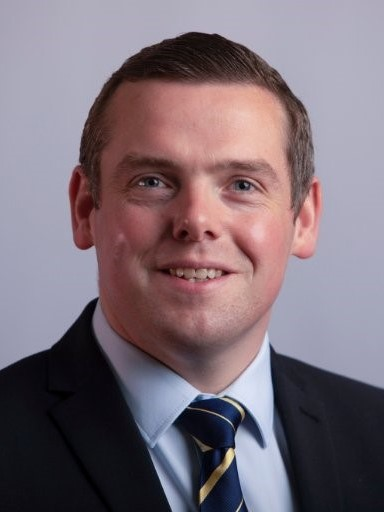
- Date formed: 11 August 2020
- Date dissolved: 27 September 2024

People and organisations
- Leader of the Opposition: Douglas Ross (2021–2024); Ruth Davidson (2020–2021)
- Member party: Scottish Conservatives

History
- Election: 2021
- Legislature terms: 5th Scottish Parliament; 6th Scottish Parliament
- Predecessor: Shadow Cabinet of Jackson Carlaw
- Successor: Shadow Cabinet of Russell Findlay

While there is no Official Opposition in Holyrood, Douglas Ross, as leader of the largest party not in government, acted as the Leader of the Opposition. Ross was appointed leader of the Scottish Conservatives in August 2020, but was not a member of the Scottish Parliament, so Ruth Davidson served as the opposition leader until he was elected in the May 2021 election.

Ross appointed his first Shadow Cabinet on 11 August 2020, which was led by Davidson. After his election to the parliament in the 2021 election, he made a reshuffle of his existing cabinet, which he then led.

== First Shadow Cabinet (2020–2021) ==
First Ross Shadow Cabinet
| Portfolio | Officeholder | Portrait | Term |
|---|---|---|---|
| Leader of the Scottish Conservatives MSP Group | Ruth Davidson MSP | | 2020–2021 |
| Shadow Cabinet Secretary for Education and Skills | Jamie Greene MSP | | 2020–2021 |
| Shadow Cabinet Secretary for Justice | Liam Kerr MSP | | 2020–2021 |
| Shadow Cabinet Secretary for Health and Sport | Donald Cameron MSP | | 2020–2021 |
| Shadow Cabinet Secretary for Finance | Murdo Fraser MSP | | 2020–2021 |
| Shadow Cabinet Secretary for Environment, Climate Change and Land Reform | Liz Smith MSP | | 2020–2021 |
| Shadow Cabinet Secretary for Rural Economy and Tourism | Oliver Mundell MSP | | 2020–2021 |
| Shadow Cabinet Secretary for the Constitution, Europe and External Affairs | Dean Lockhart MSP | | 2020–2021 |
| Shadow Cabinet Secretary for Communities and Local Government | Annie Wells MSP | | 2020–2021 |
| Shadow Cabinet Secretary for Economy, Fair Work and Culture | Maurice Golden MSP | | 2020–2021 |
| Shadow Cabinet Secretary for Transport, Infrastructure and Connectivity | Graham Simpson MSP | | 2020–2021 |
| Shadow Cabinet Secretary for Social Security and Older People | Rachael Hamilton MSP | | 2020–2021 |
| Scottish Conservative Chief Whip | Miles Briggs MSP | | 2020–2021 |

== Second Shadow Cabinet (2021–2023) ==
Second Ross Shadow Cabinet
| Portfolio | Officeholder | Term |
|---|---|---|
| Leader | Douglas Ross | 2021–present |
| COVID Recovery | Murdo Fraser | 2021–present |
| Finance and Economy | Liz Smith | 2021–present |
| Education and Skills | Oliver Mundell | 2021–2022 |
| Education and Skills | Stephen Kerr | 2022–present |
| Health and Social Care | Sandesh Gulhane | 2021–present |
| Justice | Jamie Greene | 2021–present |
| Net Zero, Energy and Transport | Liam Kerr | 2021–present |
| Social Justice, Housing and Local Government | Miles Briggs | 2021–present |
| Rural Affairs and Islands | Rachael Hamilton | 2021–present |
| Constitution, External Affairs and Culture | Donald Cameron | 2021–present |
| Chief Whip | Stephen Kerr | 2021–present |

== Third Shadow Cabinet (2023–2024) ==
Third Ross Shadow Cabinet
| Minister Constituency | | Portfolio | Shadows | Term |
Shadow Cabinet Secretaries
| | Douglas Ross; MSP for Highlands and Islands | Leader of the Scottish Conservatives | John Swinney | 2020–2024 |
| Official portrait of Meghan Gallacher MSP (cropped) | Meghan Gallacher; MSP for Central Scotland | Depute Leader | Kate Forbes | 2022–2024 |
| ElizabethSmithMSP20110508 | Liz Smith; MSP for Mid Scotland and Fife | Finance and Local Government | Shona Robison | 2021–2024 |
| Liam Kerr MSP | Liam Kerr; MSP for North East Scotland | Education and Skills | Jenny Gilruth | 2022–2024 |
| RachaelHamiltonMSP | Rachael Hamilton; MSP for Ettrick, Roxburgh and Berwickshire | Rural Affairs and the Islands | Mairi Gougeon | 2021–2024 |
| Official portrait of Murdo Fraser MSP (cropped) | Murdo Fraser; MSP for Mid Scotland and Fife | Business, Economic Growth and Tourism | Kate Forbes | 2022–2024 |
| Sandesh Gulhane 2021 | Sandesh Gulhane; MSP for Glasgow | Health and Social Care | Neil Gray | 2021–2024 |
| | Donald Cameron; MSP for Highlands and Islands | Constitution, External Affairs and Culture | Angus Robertson | 2021–2024 |
| Douglas Lumsden 2021 | Douglas Lumsden; MSP for North East Scotland | Net Zero, Energy and Transport | Màiri McAllan | 2022–2024 |
| Douglas Lumsden 2021 | Douglas Lumsden; MSP for North East Scotland | Net Zero, Energy and Transport | Fiona Hyslop | 2022–2024 |
| MilesBriggsMSP | Miles Briggs; MSP for Lothian | Social Security, Housing and Equalities | Shirley-Anne Somerville | 2022–2024 |
| | Russell Findlay; MSP for West Scotland | Justice | Angela Constance | 2022–2024 |
