= 5th Scottish Parliament =

Legislature elected in 2016

←	4th Scottish Parliament	6th Scottish Parliament	→
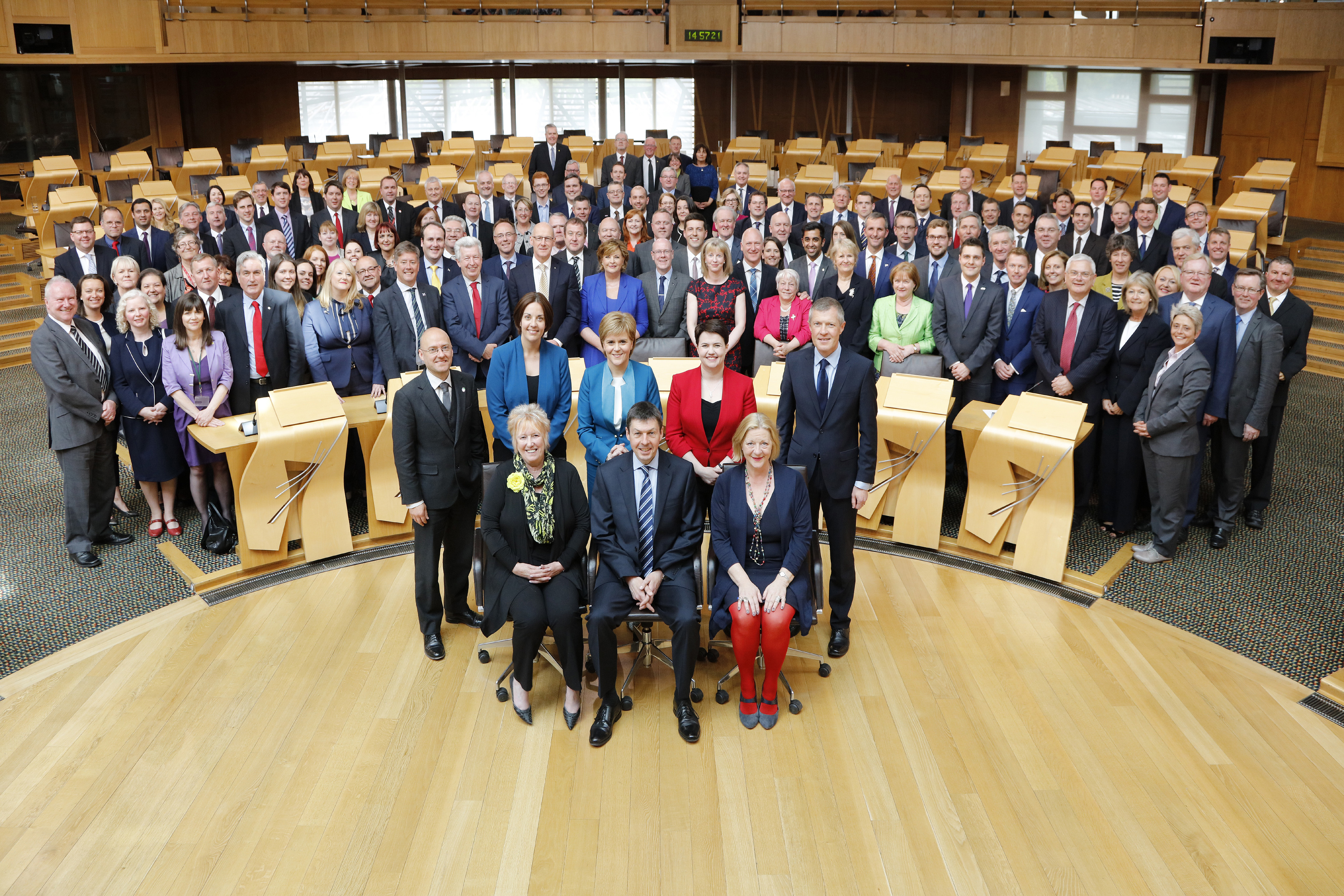
- Members elected to the Scottish Parliament on 5 May 2016

Overview
- Legislative body: Scottish Parliament
- Jurisdiction: Scotland
- Meeting place: Scottish Parliament Building
- Term: 12 May 2016 – 5 May 2021
- Election: 2016
- Government: Second Sturgeon government
- Members: 129
- Presiding Officer: Rt Hon Ken Macintosh
- First Minister: Nicola Sturgeon
- Deputy First Minister: John Swinney
- Leader of the largest opposition party: Ruth Davidson (2016–18); Jackson Carlaw (2018–19); Ruth Davidson (2019); Jackson Carlaw (2019–20); Ruth Davidson (2020–21)

This is a list of members of the Scottish Parliament (MSPs) who were returned to the fifth session of the Scottish Parliament. Of the 129 MSPs returned at the 2016 general election, 73 were returned from first past the post constituencies with a further 56 members returned from eight regions, each electing seven MSPs as a form of mixed member proportional representation.

Parliament reconvened on 12 May 2016 with the swearing-in of MSPs and the election of the presiding officer and two deputy presiding officers. Queen Elizabeth II formally opened the fifth session on 2 July 2016.

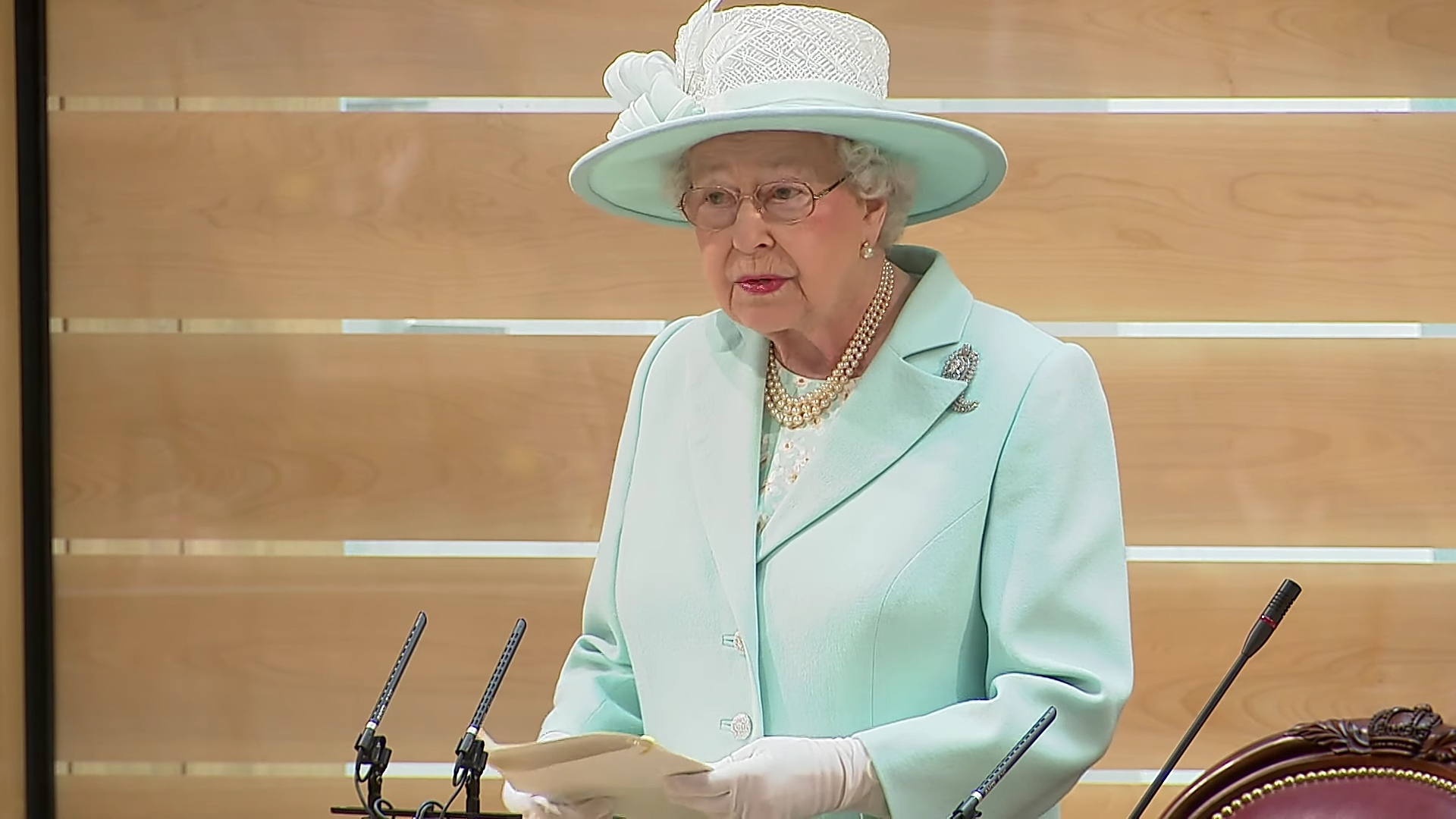
The Queen speaking at the opening ceremony

== Composition ==
Party		May 2016 election	May 2021 dissolution
•	Scottish National Party	63	61
	Scottish Conservatives	31	30
	Scottish Labour	24 (Note: Includes 13 MSPs sponsored by the Co-operative Party, who are designated Labour and Co-operative.)	23 (Note: Includes 12 MSPs sponsored by the Co-operative Party, who are designated Labour and Co-operative.)
	Scottish Greens	6	5
	Scottish Liberal Democrats	5	5
	Reform UK	0	1
	Independent	0	3
	Presiding Officer	0	1
Total		129	
Government majority		−3	−6

Government parties denoted with bullets (•)

== Graphical representation ==
These are graphical representations of the Scottish Parliament showing a comparison of party strengths as it was directly after the 2016 general election and its composition at dissolution:

- Note this is not the official seating plan of the Scottish Parliament.

== List of MSPs ==
This is a list of MSPs. The changes table below records all changes in party affiliation during the session, since the May 2016 election.

Name	Image	Member for	Type	Party
George Adam		Paisley	Constituency	Scottish National Party
Clare Adamson		Motherwell and Wishaw	Constituency	Scottish National Party
Alasdair Allan		Na h-Eileanan an Iar	Constituency	Scottish National Party
Tom Arthur		Renfrewshire South	Constituency	Scottish National Party
Jackie Baillie		Dumbarton	Constituency	Labour
Claire Baker		Mid Scotland and Fife	Regional	Labour Co-op
Jeremy Balfour		Lothian	Regional	Conservative
Michelle Ballantyne		South Scotland (since 23/05/17)	Regional	Reform UK
Claudia Beamish		South Scotland	Regional	Labour Co-op
Colin Beattie		Midlothian North and Musselburgh	Constituency	Scottish National Party
Neil Bibby		West Scotland	Regional	Labour Co-op
Bill Bowman		North East Scotland (since 21/12/16)	Regional	Conservative
Sarah Boyack		Lothian	Regional	Labour Party
Miles Briggs		Lothian	Regional	Conservative
Keith Brown		Clackmannanshire and Dunblane	Constituency	Scottish National Party
Alexander Burnett		Aberdeenshire West	Constituency	Conservative
Donald Cameron		Highlands and Islands	Regional	Conservative
Aileen Campbell		Clydesdale	Constituency	Scottish National Party
Jackson Carlaw		Eastwood	Constituency	Conservative
Finlay Carson		Galloway and West Dumfries	Constituency	Conservative
Peter Chapman		North East Scotland	Regional	Conservative
Willie Coffey		Kilmarnock and Irvine Valley	Constituency	Scottish National Party
Alex Cole-Hamilton		Edinburgh Western	Constituency	Liberal Democrats
Angela Constance		Almond Valley	Constituency	Scottish National Party
Maurice Corry		West Scotland	Regional	Conservative
Bruce Crawford		Stirling	Constituency	Scottish National Party
Roseanna Cunningham		Perthshire South and Kinross-shire	Constituency	Scottish National Party
Ruth Davidson		Edinburgh Central	Constituency	Conservative
Ash Denham		Edinburgh Eastern	Constituency	Scottish National Party
Graeme Dey		Angus South	Constituency	Scottish National Party
Bob Doris		Glasgow Maryhill and Springburn	Constituency	Scottish National Party
James Dornan		Glasgow Cathcart	Constituency	Scottish National Party
Annabelle Ewing		Cowdenbeath	Constituency	Scottish National Party
Fergus Ewing		Inverness and Nairn	Constituency	Scottish National Party
Linda Fabiani		East Kilbride	Constituency	Scottish National Party
Mary Fee		West Scotland	Regional	Labour
Neil Findlay		Lothian	Regional	Labour
John Finnie		Highlands and Islands	Regional	Green
Joe FitzPatrick		Dundee City West	Constituency	Scottish National Party
Kate Forbes		Skye, Lochaber and Badenoch	Constituency	Scottish National Party
Murdo Fraser		Mid Scotland and Fife	Regional	Conservative
Jeane Freeman		Carrick, Cumnock and Doon Valley	Constituency	Scottish National Party
Kenneth Gibson		Cunninghame North	Constituency	Scottish National Party
Jenny Gilruth		Mid Fife and Glenrothes	Constituency	Scottish National Party
Maurice Golden		West Scotland	Regional	Conservative
Mairi Gougeon (elected as Mairi Evans)		Angus North and Mearns	Constituency	Scottish National Party
Christine Grahame		Midlothian South, Tweeddale and Lauderdale	Constituency	Scottish National Party
Rhoda Grant		Highlands and Islands	Regional	Labour Co-op
Iain Gray		East Lothian	Constituency	Labour
Jamie Greene		West Scotland	Regional	Conservative
Ross Greer		West Scotland	Regional	Green
Mark Griffin		Central Scotland	Regional	Labour
Jamie Halcro Johnston		Highlands and Islands (since 20/06/17)	Regional	Conservative
Rachael Hamilton		Ettrick, Roxburgh and Berwickshire	Constituency	Conservative
Emma Harper		South Scotland	Regional	Scottish National Party
Alison Harris		Central Scotland	Regional	Conservative
Patrick Harvie		Glasgow	Regional	Green
Clare Haughey		Rutherglen	Constituency	Scottish National Party
Jamie Hepburn		Cumbernauld and Kilsyth	Constituency	Scottish National Party
Fiona Hyslop		Linlithgow	Constituency	Scottish National Party
Daniel Johnson		Edinburgh Southern	Constituency	Labour Co-op
Alison Johnstone		Lothian	Regional	Green
James Kelly		Glasgow	Regional	Labour Co-op
Liam Kerr		North East Scotland	Regional	Conservative
Bill Kidd		Glasgow Anniesland	Constituency	Scottish National Party
Johann Lamont		Glasgow	Regional	Labour Co-op
Monica Lennon		Central Scotland	Regional	Labour Co-op
Richard Leonard		Central Scotland	Regional	Labour
Gordon Lindhurst		Lothian	Regional	Conservative
Richard Lochhead		Moray	Constituency	Scottish National Party
Dean Lockhart		Mid Scotland and Fife	Regional	Conservative
Richard Lyle		Uddingston and Bellshill	Constituency	Scottish National Party
Angus MacDonald		Falkirk East	Constituency	Scottish National Party
Gordon MacDonald		Edinburgh Pentlands	Constituency	Scottish National Party
Lewis Macdonald		North East Scotland	Regional	Labour
Fulton MacGregor		Coatbridge and Chryston	Constituency	Scottish National Party
Ken Macintosh		West Scotland	Regional	Presiding Officer
Derek Mackay		Renfrewshire North and West	Constituency	Independent
Rona Mackay		Strathkelvin and Bearsden	Constituency	Scottish National Party
Ben Macpherson		Edinburgh North and Leith	Constituency	Scottish National Party
Ruth Maguire		Cunninghame South	Constituency	Scottish National Party
Jenny Marra		North East Scotland	Regional	Labour
Gillian Martin		Aberdeenshire East	Constituency	Scottish National Party
John Mason		Glasgow Shettleston	Constituency	Scottish National Party
Tom Mason		North East Scotland (since 20/06/17)	Regional	Conservative
Michael Matheson		Falkirk West	Constituency	Scottish National Party
Joan McAlpine		South Scotland	Regional	Scottish National Party
Liam McArthur		Orkney	Constituency	Liberal Democrats
Mark McDonald		Aberdeen Donside	Constituency	Independent
Ivan McKee		Glasgow Provan	Constituency	Scottish National Party
Christina McKelvie		Hamilton, Larkhall and Stonehouse	Constituency	Scottish National Party
Stuart McMillan		Greenock and Inverclyde	Constituency	Scottish National Party
Pauline McNeill		Glasgow	Regional	Labour Co-op
Margaret Mitchell		Central Scotland	Regional	Conservative
Edward Mountain		Highlands and Islands	Regional	Conservative
Oliver Mundell		Dumfriesshire	Constituency	Conservative
Alex Neil		Airdrie and Shotts	Constituency	Scottish National Party
Gil Paterson		Clydebank and Milngavie	Constituency	Scottish National Party
Willie Rennie		North East Fife	Constituency	Liberal Democrats
Shona Robison		Dundee City East	Constituency	Scottish National Party
Gail Ross		Caithness, Sutherland and Ross	Constituency	Scottish National Party
Alex Rowley		Mid Scotland and Fife	Regional	Labour
Mike Rumbles		North East Scotland	Regional	Liberal Democrats
Mark Ruskell		Mid Scotland and Fife	Regional	Green
Michael Russell		Argyll and Bute	Constituency	Scottish National Party
Anas Sarwar		Glasgow	Regional	Labour Co-op
John Scott		Ayr	Constituency	Conservative
Graham Simpson		Central Scotland	Regional	Conservative
Elaine Smith		Central Scotland	Regional	Labour
Liz Smith		Mid Scotland and Fife	Regional	Conservative
Colin Smyth		South Scotland	Regional	Labour Co-op
Shirley-Anne Somerville		Dunfermline	Constituency	Scottish National Party
Stewart Stevenson		Banffshire and Buchan Coast	Constituency	Scottish National Party
Alexander Stewart		Mid Scotland and Fife	Regional	Conservative
David Stewart		Highlands and Islands	Regional	Labour Co-op
Kevin Stewart		Aberdeen Central	Constituency	Scottish National Party
Nicola Sturgeon		Glasgow Southside	Constituency	Scottish National Party
John Swinney		Perthshire North	Constituency	Scottish National Party
Maree Todd		Highlands and Islands	Regional	Scottish National Party
Adam Tomkins		Glasgow	Regional	Conservative
David Torrance		Kirkcaldy	Constituency	Scottish National Party
Maureen Watt		Aberdeen South and North Kincardine	Constituency	Scottish National Party
Annie Wells		Glasgow	Regional	Conservative
Paul Wheelhouse		South Scotland	Regional	Scottish National Party
Sandra White		Glasgow Kelvin	Constituency	Scottish National Party
Brian Whittle		South Scotland	Regional	Conservative
Andy Wightman		Lothian	Regional	Independent
Beatrice Wishart		Shetland	Constituency	Liberal Democrats
Humza Yousaf		Glasgow Pollok	Constituency	Scottish National Party

=== Former MSPs ===
Name	Image	Member for	Type	Party	Notes
Kezia Dugdale		Lothian	Regional	Labour Co-op	Resigned 15 July 2019
Alex Johnstone		North East Scotland	Regional	Conservative	Died 7 December 2016
John Lamont		Ettrick, Roxburgh and Berwickshire	Constituency	Conservative	Resigned 27 April 2017
Douglas Ross		Highlands and Islands	Regional	Conservative	Resigned 11 June 2017
Tavish Scott		Shetland	Constituency	Liberal Democrats	Resigned 15 July 2019
Ross Thomson		North East Scotland	Regional	Conservative	Resigned 12 June 2017

== Changes ==
Date	Constituency/region	Gain	Loss	Note
12 May 2016	West Scotland	Presiding Officer	Labour Co-op	Ken Macintosh was elected Presiding Officer and consequently had to renounce his party affiliation.
7 December 2016	North East Scotland	Conservative	Conservative	Alex Johnstone died on 7 December 2016, aged 55. It was announced on 13 December that the Conservatives had nominated Bill Bowman to replace Johnstone. Bowman was sworn in on 21 December.
27 April 2017	Ettrick, Roxburgh and Berwickshire	Conservative	Conservative	John Lamont resigned his seat, effective 4 May 2017, in order to contest the 2017 UK general election. This triggered a by-election in his Scottish Parliament seat, which was held on the same day as the UK general election (8 June 2017). Rachael Hamilton won the seat.
2 May 2017	South Scotland	Conservative	Conservative	Rachael Hamilton resigned her list seat in order to contest the 2017 Ettrick, Roxburgh and Berwickshire by-election on 8 June. She was replaced by Michelle Ballantyne, who was sworn in on 23 May.
11 June 2017	Highlands and Islands	Conservative	Conservative	Douglas Ross resigned his seat in the Scottish Parliament, having won election to the UK Parliament in the 2017 general election. Ross was succeeded by Jamie Halcro Johnston, who was sworn in on 20 June.
12 June 2017	North East Scotland	Conservative	Conservative	Ross Thomson resigned his seat in the Scottish Parliament, having won election to the UK Parliament in the 2017 general election. Thomson was succeeded by Tom Mason, who was sworn in on 20 June.
15 November 2017	Mid Scotland and Fife	Independent	Labour	Alex Rowley was suspended by Labour due to allegations about his conduct.
16 November 2017	Aberdeen Donside	Independent	SNP	Mark McDonald was suspended by the SNP due to allegations about his conduct, and he subsequently resigned his membership of the SNP.
19 December 2017	Mid Scotland and Fife	Labour	Independent	Alex Rowley was reinstated by Labour.
15 July 2019	Lothian	Labour Co-op	Labour Co-op	Kezia Dugdale resigned her seat in the Scottish Parliament, taking a job with a think-tank. Dugale was succeeded by Sarah Boyack.
15 July 2019	Shetland	Liberal Democrats	Liberal Democrats	Tavish Scott resigned his seat in the Scottish Parliament, taking a job with Scottish Rugby. This triggered a by-election, which was won Beatrice Wishart.
6 February 2020	Renfrewshire North and West	Independent	SNP	Derek Mackay was suspended by the SNP due to allegations about his conduct.
24 November 2020	South Scotland	Independent	Conservative	Michelle Ballantyne left the Conservative Party due to disagreements over policy relating to the COVID-19 pandemic.
18 December 2020	Lothian	Independent	Green	Andy Wightman resigned from the Scottish Green Party due to disagreements over policy relating to transgender rights.
11 January 2021	South Scotland	Reform	Independent	Michelle Ballantyne joined Reform UK (formerly known as the Brexit Party) and was appointed leader of Reform UK Scotland.
