= 2020 Scottish Conservative Party leadership election =

2020 Scottish Conservative Party leadership election may refer to:

- February 2020 Scottish Conservative Party leadership election
- August 2020 Scottish Conservative Party leadership election
