= 2019 United Kingdom general election in Scotland =

- 12 December 2019

All 59 Scottish seats to the House of Commons
- Turnout: 68.1% ▲1.6pp
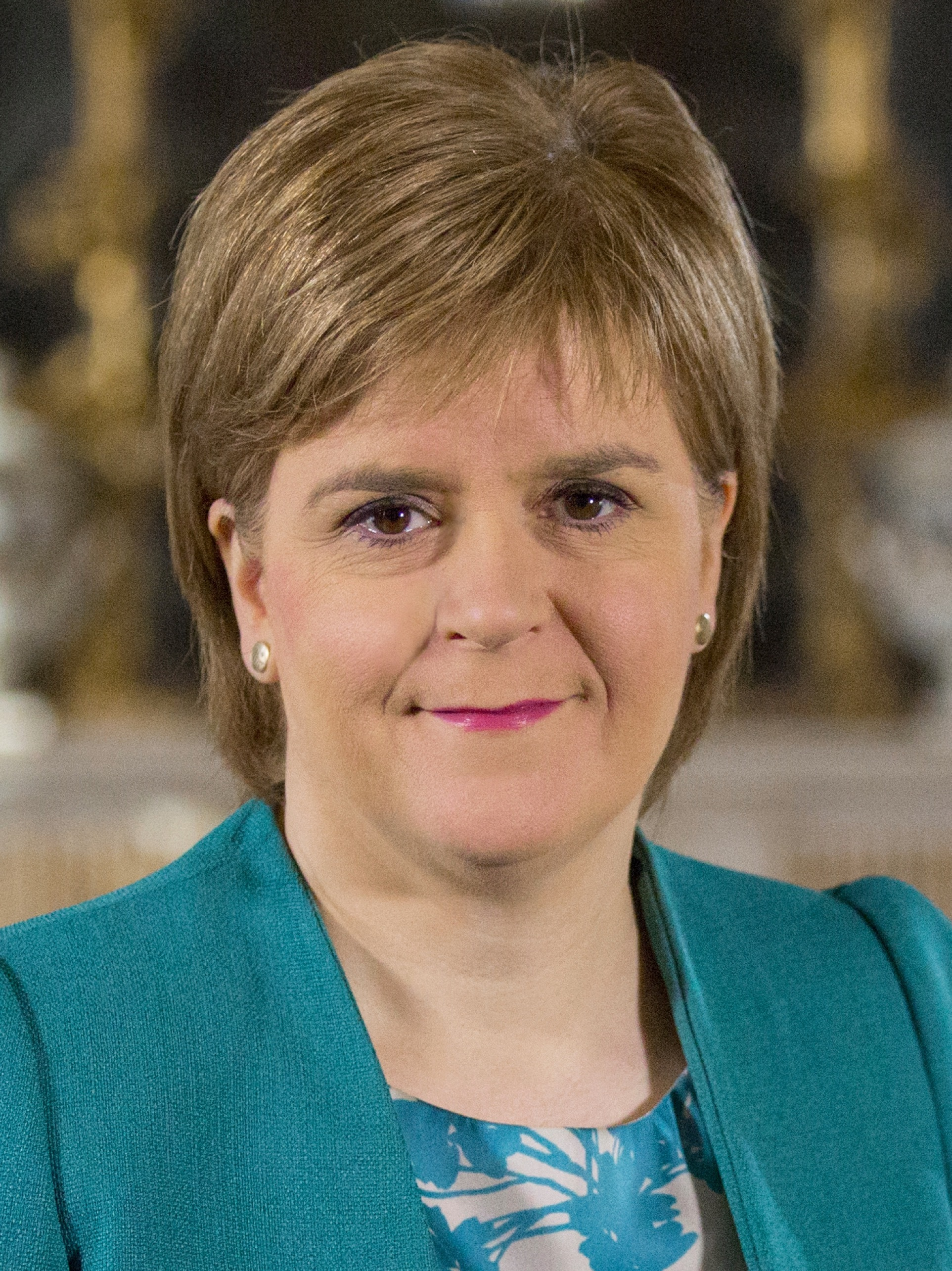

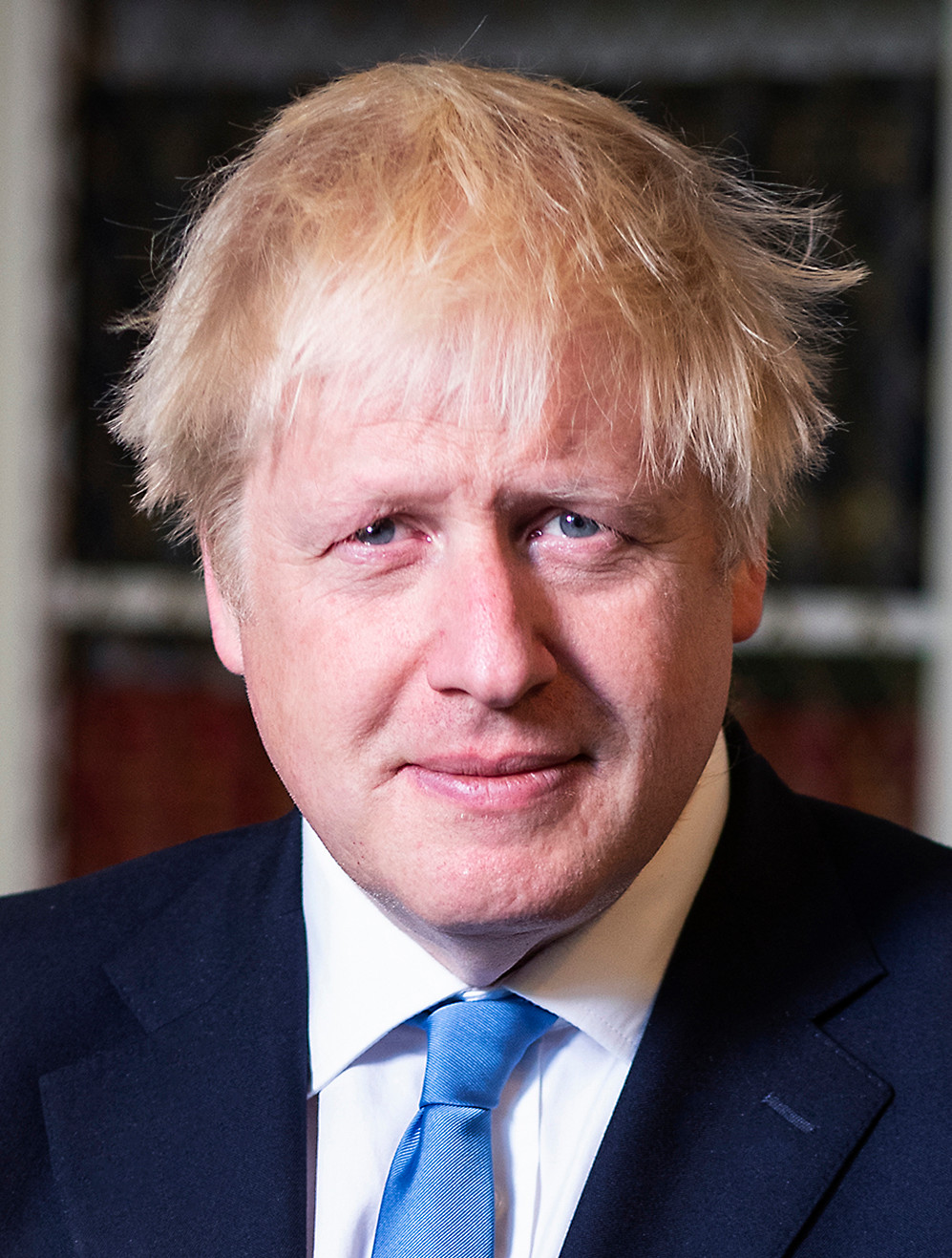

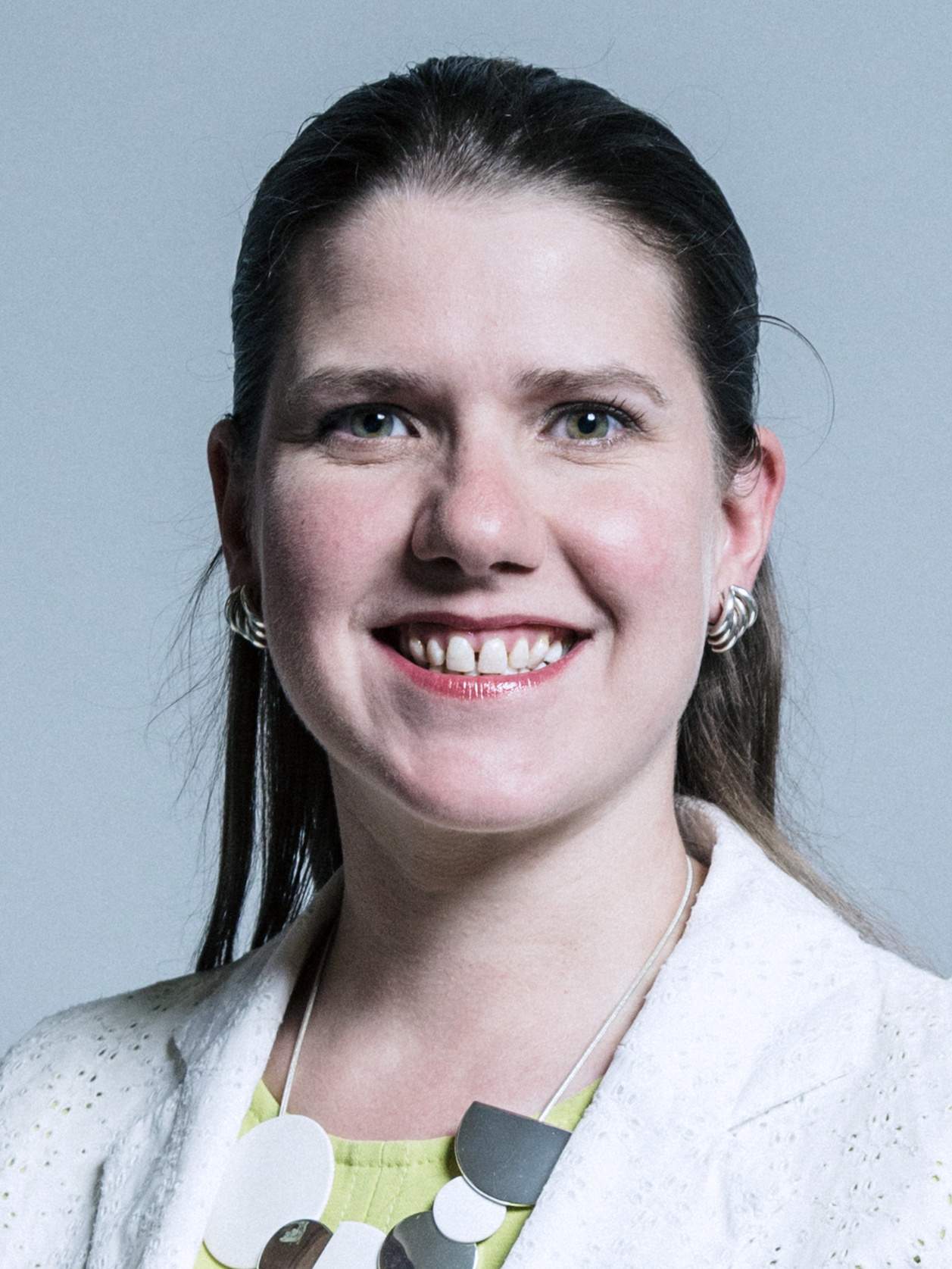

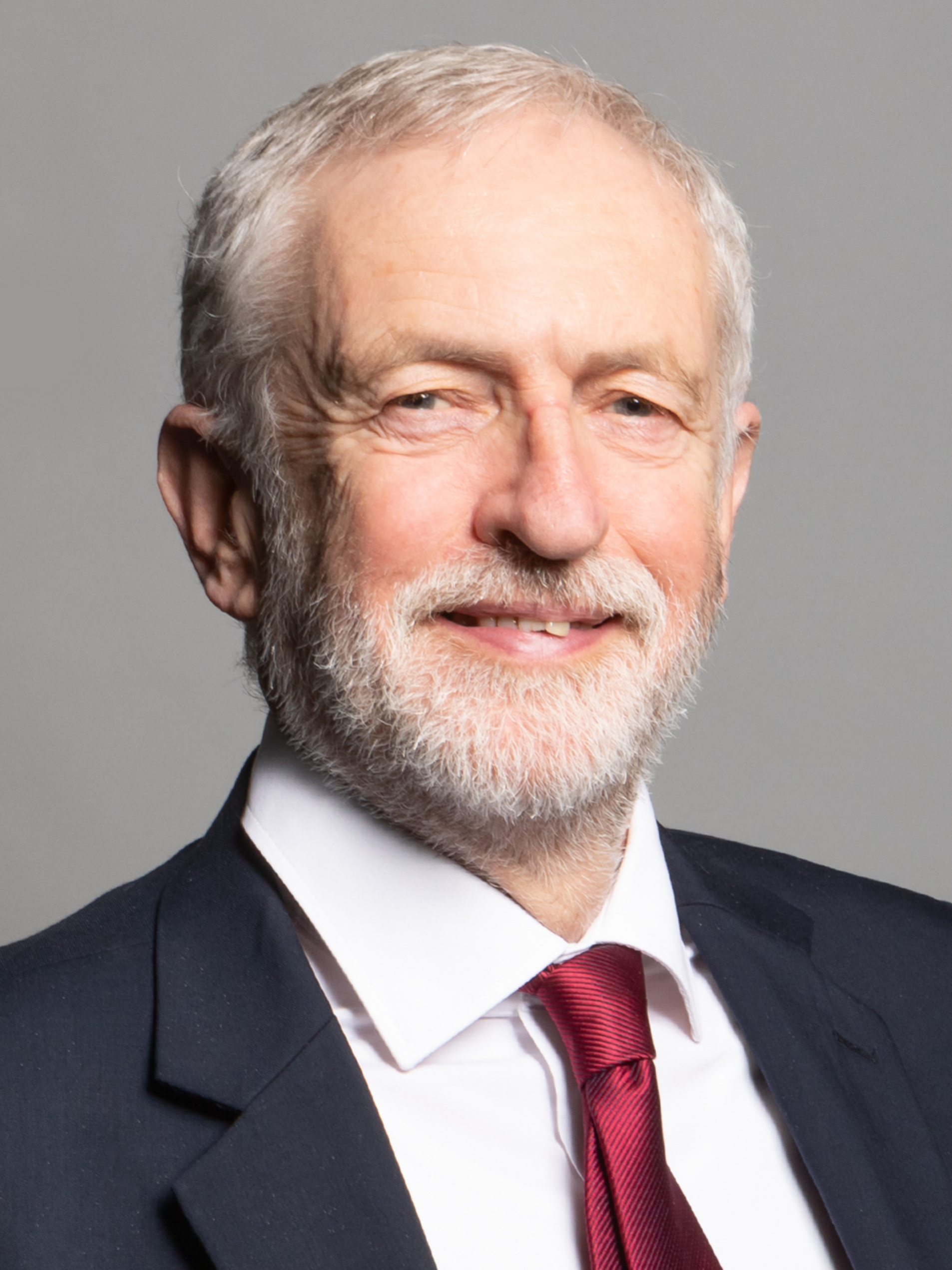
| | First party | Second party |
|---|---|---|
| Leader | Nicola Sturgeon | Boris Johnson |
| Party | SNP | Conservative |
| Leader since | 14 November 2014 | 23 July 2019 |
| Leader's seat | Did not stand | Uxbridge and South Ruislip |
| Last election | 35 seats, 36.9% | 13 seats, 28.6% |
| Seats won | 48 (Note: Includes Neale Hanvey, who was suspended from the party at the time of his election and thus took his seat as an independent.) | 6 |
| Seat change | ▲13 | ▼7 |
| Popular vote | 1,242,380 | 692,939 |
| Percentage | 45.0% | 25.1% |
| Swing | ▲8.1 pp | ▼3.5 pp |
| | Third party | Fourth party |
| Leader | Jo Swinson | Jeremy Corbyn |
| Party | Liberal Democrats | Labour |
| Leader since | 22 July 2019 | 12 September 2015 |
| Leader's seat | East Dunbartonshire (lost seat) | Islington North |
| Last election | 4 seats, 6.8% | 7 seats, 27.1% |
| Seats won | 4 | 1 |
| Seat change | Steady | ▼6 |
| Popular vote | 263,417 | 511,838 |
| Percentage | 9.5% | 18.6% |
| Swing | ▲2.8 pp | ▼8.5 pp |
- Coloured according to the winning party's vote share in each constituency

On 12 December 2019, the 2019 United Kingdom general election was held in Scotland, to elect all 650 members of the House of Commons, including the 59 Scottish seats.

It was held two and a half years after the previous general election in June 2017. The Scottish National Party (SNP) received the most votes (45%, up 8.1% from the previous election) and won 48 out of 59 seats—a gain of 13 over those won in 2017, and 81% of the Scottish seats in the House of Commons.

SNP gains came at the expense of both Labour and the Conservatives. The Tories remained the largest unionist party in Scotland even though they lost more than half of their Scottish seats, winning six compared to thirteen in 2017. Labour was reduced to only one seat, down from seven. The Liberal Democrats won four Scottish seats for no net change, although party leader Jo Swinson (herself the only major party leader to stand for election in Scotland) was unseated in her bid for re-election by her SNP challenger.

Labour's vote share was its lowest at a Westminster election in Scotland since December 1910.

== Political context ==
The June 2017 general election in Scotland was fought in the aftermath of the 2016 Scottish Parliament election, in which the SNP won a third term in government but lost its overall majority in the Scottish Parliament (although the proportional electoral system at Holyrood was intentionally designed to make it very difficult for any one party to gain a majority). The 2016 EU referendum was held a month later on Thursday 23 June, and the final result was for the United Kingdom to leave the EU, although Scotland voted 62.0% Remain. Negotiations then began after the invocation of Article 50 of the Treaty on European Union in March 2017, which was expected to dominate the snap general election campaign.

In March First Minister Nicola Sturgeon called for a second independence referendum due to Scotland's vote to remain in the EU the previous year. The result was the issue dominated the 2017 general election and, although the SNP remained the largest party, their number of seats was much reduced, with the Scottish Conservatives, Labour and the Liberal Democrats gaining a total of 21 seats. Former First Minister Alex Salmond and Westminster leader Angus Robertson were among those who lost their seats.

In the 2019 European Parliament election, Scottish Labour lost its two MEPs, UKIP lost its seat, the SNP increased its number to three, the Scottish Conservatives held theirs and the Brexit Party and Liberal Democrats gained one each.

== Opinion polling ==
| Pollster/client(s) | Date(s) conducted | Sample size | SNP | Con | Lab | Lib Dem | Green | UKIP | Change UK | Brexit | Other | Lead |
|---|---|---|---|---|---|---|---|---|---|---|---|---|
| 2019 general election | 12 Dec 2019 | – | 45.0% | 25.1% | 18.6% | 9.5% | 1.0% | 0.1% | – | 0.5% | 0.1% | 19.9% |
| Survation/The Courier | 10–11 Dec 2019 | 1,012 | 43% | 28% | 20% | 7% | 1% | – | – | 1% | – | 15% |
| YouGov (MRP) | 4–10 Dec 2019 | | 41% | 27% | 20% | 10% | 1% | – | – | 1% | – | 14% |
| Panelbase/Sunday Times | 3–6 Dec 2019 | 1,020 | 39% | 29% | 21% | 10% | 1% | – | – | 0% | 0% | 10% |
| YouGov/The Times | 29 Nov–3 Dec 2019 | 1,002 | 44% | 28% | 15% | 12% | 1% | – | – | 0% | 0% | 16% |
| Ipsos MORI/STV | 19–25 Nov 2019 | 1,046 | 44% | 26% | 16% | 11% | 2% | – | – | <1% | – | 18% |
| Panelbase/The Sunday Times | 20–22 Nov 2019 | 1,009 | 40% | 28% | 20% | 11% | <1% | – | – | <1% | <1% | 12% |
| | 15 Nov | Nominations for candidates close (final candidates announced) | | | | | | | | | | |
| | 6 Nov | Parliament dissolved and official campaign period begins | | | | | | | | | | |
| YouGov | 23–25 Oct 2019 | 1,060 | 42% | 22% | 12% | 13% | 4% | 0% | 0% | 6% | 0% | 20% |
| Panelbase/The Sunday Times | 9–11 Oct 2019 | 1,003 | 39% | 21% | 19% | 13% | 2% | – | – | 5% | – | 18% |
| YouGov/The Times | 30 Aug–3 Sep 2019 | 1,059 | 43% | 20% | 15% | 12% | 4% | 0% | 0% | 6% | 0% | 23% |
| | 29 Aug 2019 | Ruth Davidson resigns as leader of the Scottish Conservatives | | | | | | | | | | |
| Panelbase/The Sunday Times | 18–20 Jun 2019 | 1,024 | 38% | 18% | 17% | 13% | 2% | <1% | <1% | 9% | – | 20% |
| Panelbase/The Sunday Times | 14–17 May 2019 | 1,021 | 38% | 18% | 19% | 10% | 3% | 1% | 2% | 9% | <1% | 19% |
| YouGov/The Times | 24–26 Apr 2019 | 1,029 | 43% | 20% | 17% | 9% | 3% | 1% | 2% | 4% | 0% | 23% |
| Panelbase/The Sunday Times | 18–24 Apr 2019 | 1,018 | 38% | 22% | 21% | 6% | 2% | 2% | 3% | 5% | <1% | 16% |
| Survation/Scotland in Union | 18–23 Apr 2019 | 1,012 | 41% | 22% | 24% | 8% | – | – | – | – | 5% | 17% |
| Panelbase/Wings Over Scotland | 28 Feb–6 Mar 2019 | 1,002 | 37% | 27% | 22% | 7% | 2% | 2% | 2% | – | <1% | 10% |
| Survation/Scottish Daily Mail | 1–4 Mar 2019 | 1,011 | 40% | 24% | 23% | 8% | – | – | – | – | 4% | 16% |
| Panelbase/The Sunday Times | 30 Nov–5 Dec 2018 | 1,028 | 37% | 26% | 26% | 6% | 2% | 2% | – | – | <1% | 11% |
| Survation/Scotland in Union | 9–13 Nov 2018 | 1,013 | 39% | 26% | 24% | 8% | – | – | – | – | 3% | 13% |
| Panelbase/Constitutional Commission | 2–7 Nov 2018 | 1,050 | 37% | 28% | 25% | 7% | 2% | 2% | – | – | 3% | 9% |
| Survation/Channel 4 | 20 Oct–2 Nov 2018 | 1,734 | 40% | 27% | 23% | 7% | 1% | 1% | – | – | 1% | 13% |
| Survation/Daily Record | 18–21 Oct 2018 | 1,017 | 36% | 27% | 26% | 7% | 1% | – | – | – | 1% | 9% |
| Survation/SNP | 3–5 Oct 2018 | 1,013 | 37% | 28% | 26% | 6% | – | – | – | – | 2% | 9% |
| Panelbase/The Sunday Times | 28 Sep–4 Oct 2018 | 1,024 | 38% | 27% | 24% | 6% | 2% | 2% | – | – | <1% | 11% |
| Survation/The Sunday Post | 28 Sep–2 Oct 2018 | 1,036 | 41% | 26% | 24% | 7% | – | – | – | – | 3% | 15% |
| Survation/Daily Record | 5–10 Jul 2018 | 1,004 | 42% | 24% | 23% | 8% | – | – | – | – | 3% | 18% |
| Panelbase/Wings Over Scotland | 21–26 Jun 2018 | 1,018 | 38% | 27% | 25% | 7% | 2% | <1% | – | – | <1% | 11% |
| Panelbase/The Sunday Times | 8–13 Jun 2018 | 1,021 | 38% | 27% | 27% | 6% | 2% | <1% | – | – | <1% | 11% |
| YouGov/The Times | 1–5 Jun 2018 | 1,075 | 40% | 27% | 23% | 7% | 2% | 1% | – | – | 1% | 13% |
| Panelbase/The Sunday Times | 23–28 Mar 2018 | 1,037 | 36% | 28% | 27% | 6% | 2% | 1% | – | – | <1% | 8% |
| Ipsos MORI/STV | 5–11 Mar 2018 | 1,050 | 39% | 25% | 26% | 6% | 4% | 0% | – | – | 0% | 13% |
| Survation/Daily Record | 24–28 Jan 2018 | 1,029 | 39% | 24% | 27% | 7% | – | – | – | – | 3% | 12% |
| YouGov/The Times | 12–16 Jan 2018 | 1,002 | 36% | 23% | 28% | 6% | 3% | 3% | – | – | 0% | 8% |
| Survation/The Sunday Post | 1–5 Dec 2017 | 1,006 | 38% | 24% | 29% | 7% | – | – | – | – | 3% | 9% |
| Survation/Daily Record | 27–30 Nov 2017 | 1,017 | 37% | 25% | 28% | 7% | – | – | – | – | 3% | 9% |
| | 18 Nov 2017 | Richard Leonard officially becomes leader of Scottish Labour | | | | | | | | | | |
| YouGov/The Times | 2–5 Oct 2017 | 1,135 | 40% | 23% | 30% | 5% | 1% | 1% | – | – | 0% | 10% |
| Survation/Scottish Daily Mail | 8–12 Sep 2017 | 1,016 | 39% | 26% | 26% | 7% | – | – | – | – | 2% | 13% |
| Panelbase/The Sunday Times | 31 Aug–7 Sep 2017 | 1,021 | 41% | 27% | 24% | 6% | 2% | – | – | – | – | 14% |
| 2017 general election | 8 Jun 2017 | – | 36.9% | 28.6% | 27.1% | 6.8% | 0.2% | 0.2% | – | – | 0.3% | 8.3% |

=== Seat projections ===
| Pollster/client(s) | Date(s) conducted | Con | Lab | SNP | Lib Dem | Green | Brexit | Other |
|---|---|---|---|---|---|---|---|---|
| 2019 general election | 12 December 2019 | 6 | 1 | 48 | 4 | 0 | 0 | 0 |
| YouGov MRP | 10 December 2019 | 9 | 5 | 41 | 4 | 0 | 0 | 0 |
| Ipsos MORI Scotland/STV | 28 November 2019 | 6 | 1 | 48 | 4 | 0 | 0 | 0 |
| YouGov MRP | 27 November 2019 | 11 | 2 | 42 | 4 | 0 | 0 | 0 |
| 2017 general election | 8 June 2017 | 13 | 7 | 35 | 4 | 0 | 0 | 0 |

== Campaign events ==
=== Television debates ===
Like the rest of the United Kingdom, Scottish broadcasters hosted television debates. On 20 November, BBC Scotland's flagship political programme, Debate Night, moderated by Stephen Jardine, hosted a Young Voter's Special with representatives from the main parties where they debated in front of an audience of voters aged under 30. On 3 December, STV hosted a television debate moderated by Colin Mackay and BBC Scotland announced that they would host a debate on 10 December, two days before the election, moderated by Sarah Smith.

| Date | Organisers | Venue | Moderators | P Present S Standing-in NI Not invited A Absent I Invited | | | | | |
| Date | Organisers | Venue | Moderators | Con | Lab | SNP | LD | Green | Brexit |
|---|---|---|---|---|---|---|---|---|---|
| 20 November | BBC Scotland (Debate Night) (Note: Young Voter's Special with representatives from the main parties where they debated in front of an audience of voters aged under 30) | Scottish Youth Theatre, Glasgow | Stephen Jardine | S Gallacher | S Sweeney | S Linden | S Cole-Hamilton | P Slater | NI |
| 26 November | Sky News | City Observatory, Edinburgh | Adam Boulton | S Greene | P Leonard | S Blackford | P Rennie | A Harvie | NI |
| 2 December | BBC (Victoria Derbyshire Election Debate) | North Berwick, East Lothian | Victoria Derbyshire | S Hoy | S Whitfield | S MacAskill | S O'Riordan | NI | NI |
| 3 December | STV | STV Pacific Quay, Glasgow | Colin Mackay | P Carlaw | P Leonard | P Sturgeon | P Rennie | NI | NI |
| 10 December | BBC Scotland | BBC Pacific Quay, Glasgow | Sarah Smith | P Carlaw | P Leonard | P Sturgeon | P Rennie | NI | NI |

The Scottish National Party have been represented in UK-wide television debates in addition due to being the third largest party in the House of Commons.

==== Reaction ====
| Date(s) administered | Poll source | Sample size | Carlaw | Leonard | Sturgeon | Rennie | Lead |
|---|---|---|---|---|---|---|---|
STV Leaders Debate
| 3 December 2019 | STV News (Note: Social polling conducted by STV News shortly after the debate) | 7,170 | 10% | 5% | 80% | 5% | 70% |
| 3 December 2019 | HeraldScotland | 9,115 | 7% | 4% | 87% | 2% | 80% |
BBC Leaders Debate
| 10 December 2019 | HeraldScotland | 2,834 | 7% | 17% | 72% | 4% | 55% |

==== Leader's interviews ====
In addition to television debates, BBC Scotland and STV also interviewed Scottish party leaders on The Nine and Scotland Tonight in the run-up to the general election, alongside guest commentary too.

On 4 December, the four main Scottish party leaders took part in leaders interviews with fictional character Chief Commissioner Cameron Mickelson from the BBC Scotland sitcom, Scot Squad.

== Results ==
| Party | Seats | | | | | Aggregate votes | | |
| Party | Total | Gains | Losses | Net | Of all (%) | Total | Of all (%) | Difference |
|---|---|---|---|---|---|---|---|---|
| SNP | 48 | 14 | 1 | ▲13 | 81.36 | 1,242,380 | 45.0 | ▲8.1 |
| Conservative | 6 | 0 | 7 | ▼7 | 10.17 | 692,939 | 25.1 | ▼3.5 |
| Labour | 1 | 0 | 6 | ▼6 | 1.69 | 511,838 | 18.6 | ▼8.5 |
| Liberal Democrats | 4 | 1 | 1 | Steady | 6.77 | 263,417 | 9.5 | ▲2.8 |
| Green | 0 | 0 | 0 | Steady | — | 28,122 | 1.0 | ▲0.8 |
| Brexit Party | 0 | New | | | — | 13,243 | 0.5 | New |
| UKIP | 0 | 0 | 0 | Steady | — | 3,303 | 0.1 | ▼0.1 |
| Others | 0 | 0 | 0 | Steady | — | 3,819 | 0.1 | ▲0.1 |
| Total | 59 | | | | | 2,759,061 | 68.1 | ▲1.6 |

2019 map of Scottish Constituencies - Results

=== Votes summary ===
Popular vote
| SNP | 45.0% |
| Conservative | 25.1% |
| Labour | 18.6% |
| Liberal Democrats | 9.5% |
| Greens | 1.0% |
| Brexit Party | 0.5% |
| UKIP | 0.1% |
| Other | 0.1% |

Parliament seats
| SNP | 81.4% |
| Conservative | 10.2% |
| Liberal Democrats | 6.8% |
| Labour | 1.7% |

=== List of constituencies by party ===
2019 UK general election (Scottish Westminster constituencies)
| Party | Constituency |
|---|---|
| SNP | Aberdeen North; Aberdeen South; Airdrie and Shotts; Angus; Argyll and Bute; Ayr, Carrick and Cumnock; Central Ayrshire; Coatbridge, Chryston and Bellshill; Cumbernauld, Kilsyth and Kirkintilloch East; Dundee East; Dundee West; Dunfermline and West Fife; East Kilbride, Strathaven and Lesmahagow; East Dunbartonshire; East Lothian; East Renfrewshire; Edinburgh East; Edinburgh North and Leith; Edinburgh South West; Falkirk; Glasgow Central; Glasgow East; Glasgow North; Glasgow North East; Glasgow North West; Glasgow South; Glasgow South West; Glenrothes; Gordon; Inverclyde; Inverness, Nairn, Badenoch and Strathspey; Kilmarnock and Loudoun; Kirkcaldy and Cowdenbeath (Note: The seat was won by Neale Hanvey, who was suspended from the party at the time of his election and thus took his seat as an independent.); Lanark and Hamilton East; Linlithgow and East Falkirk; Livingston; Midlothian; Motherwell and Wishaw; Na h-Eileanan an Iar; North Ayrshire and Arran; Ochil and South Perthshire; Paisley and Renfrewshire North; Paisley and Renfrewshire South; Perth and North Perthshire; Rutherglen and Hamilton West; Ross, Skye and Lochaber; Stirling; West Dunbartonshire |
| Conservative | Banff and Buchan; Berwickshire, Roxburgh and Selkirk; Dumfries and Galloway; Dumfriesshire, Clydesdale and Tweeddale; Moray; West Aberdeenshire and Kincardine |
| Liberal Democrats | Caithness, Sutherland and Easter Ross; Edinburgh West; North East Fife; Orkney and Shetland |
| Labour | Edinburgh South |

== Target seats ==
=== Scottish Conservatives ===
| Rank | Constituency | Winning party 2017 | Swing required | Conservatives' place 2019 | Result |
|---|---|---|---|---|---|
| 1 | Perth and North Perthshire | SNP | 0.02% | 2nd | SNP |
| 2 | Lanark and Hamilton East | SNP | 0.26% | 2nd | SNP |
| 3 | Edinburgh South West | SNP | 1.11% | 2nd | SNP |
| 4 | Argyll and Bute | SNP | 1.38% | 2nd | SNP |
| 5 | East Lothian | Labour | 3.24% | 3rd | SNP |
| 6 | Linlithgow and Falkirk East | SNP | 3.63% | 2nd | SNP |
| 7 | Ayrshire North and Arran | SNP | 3.66% | 2nd | SNP |
| 8 | Edinburgh North and Leith | SNP | 3.9% | 3rd | SNP |

=== Scottish Labour ===
| Rank | Constituency | Winning party 2017 | Swing required | Labour's place 2019 | Result |
|---|---|---|---|---|---|
| 1 | Glasgow South West | SNP | 0.08% | 2nd | SNP |
| 2 | Glasgow East | SNP | 0.10% | 2nd | SNP |
| 3 | Airdrie and Shotts | SNP | 0.26% | 2nd | SNP |
| 4 | Lanark and Hamilton East | SNP | 0.36% | 3rd | SNP |
| 5 | Motherwell and Wishaw | SNP | 0.38% | 2nd | SNP |
| 6 | Inverclyde | SNP | 0.49% | 2nd | SNP |
| 7 | Dunfermline and West Fife | SNP | 0.81% | 2nd | SNP |
| 8 | Edinburgh North and Leith | SNP | 1.44% | 2nd | SNP |

=== Scottish Liberal Democrats ===
| Rank | Constituency | Winning party 2017 | Swing Required | Liberal Democrats' place 2019 | Result |
|---|---|---|---|---|---|
| 1 | North East Fife | SNP | <0.01% | 1st | Liberal Democrats |
| 2 | Ross, Skye and Lochaber | SNP | 9.67% | 2nd | SNP |
| 3 | Argyll and Bute | SNP | 15.04% | 3rd | SNP |
| 4 | Inverness, Nairn, Badenoch and Strathspey | SNP | 18.26% | 3rd | SNP |

=== Scottish National Party ===
| Rank | Constituency | Winning party 2017 | Swing required | SNP's place 2019 | Result |
|---|---|---|---|---|---|
| 1 | Stirling | Conservative | 0.15% | 1st | SNP |
| 2 | Rutherglen and Hamilton West | Labour | 0.26% | 1st | SNP |
| 3 | Kirkcaldy and Cowdenbeath | Labour | 0.28% | 1st | SNP |
| 4 | Glasgow North East | Labour | 0.38% | 1st | SNP |
| 5 | Midlothian | Labour | 0.98% | 1st | SNP |
| 6 | Coatbridge, Chryston and Bellshill | Labour | 1.76% | 1st | SNP |
| 7 | Gordon | Conservative | 2.43% | 1st | SNP |
| 8 | East Lothian | Labour | 2.76% | 1st | SNP |
| 9 | Edinburgh West | Liberal Democrats | 2.83% | 2nd | Liberal Democrats |

== See also ==
- 2019 United Kingdom general election in England
- 2019 United Kingdom general election in Northern Ireland
- 2019 United Kingdom general election in Wales
