= August 2020 Scottish Conservatives leadership election =

August 2020 Scottish Conservative Party leadership election
- 5 August 2020
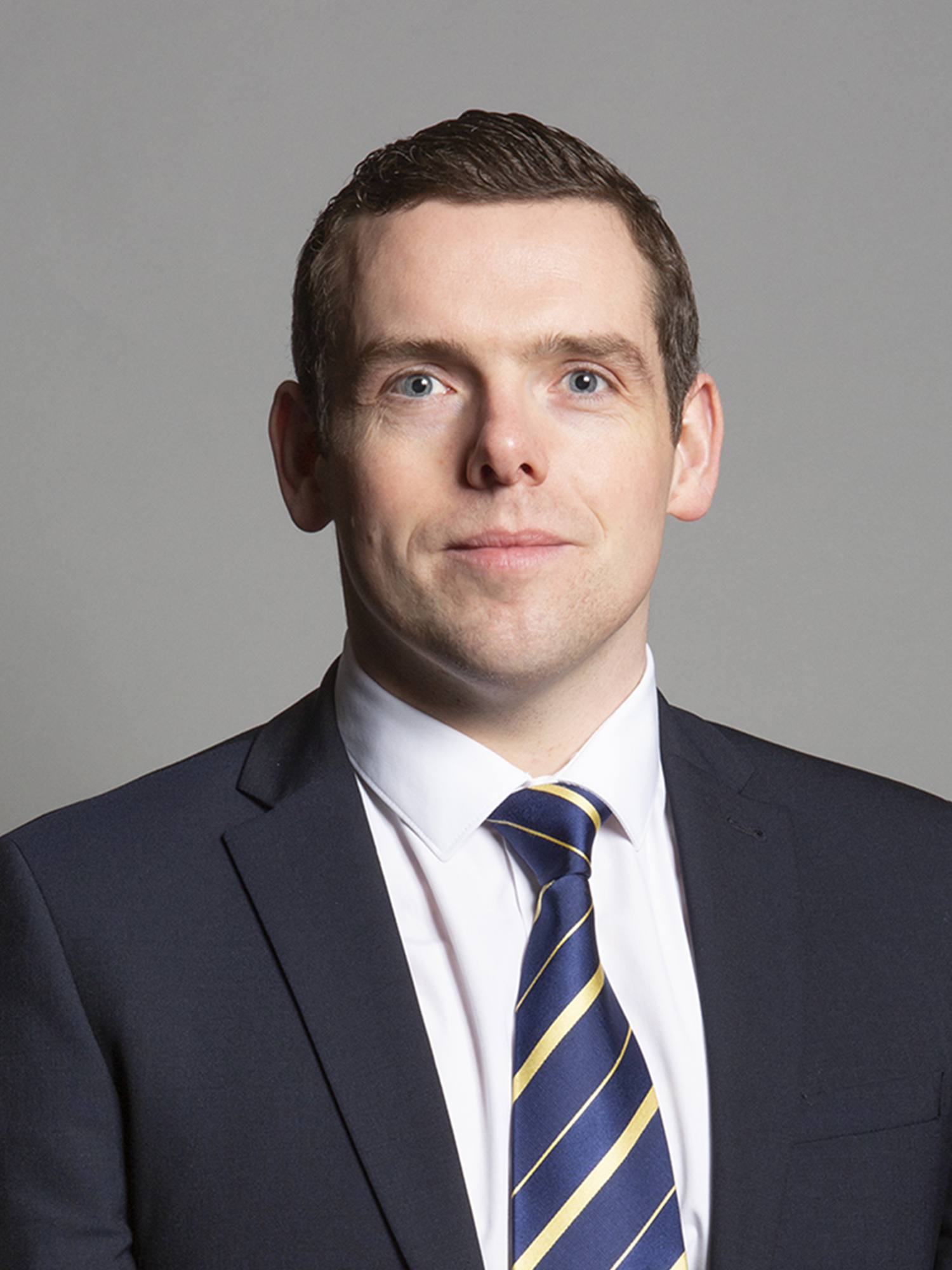
Candidate	Douglas Ross
Popular vote	Unopposed
Leader before election
Jackson Carlaw
Elected Leader
Douglas Ross

The August 2020 Scottish Conservative Party leadership election was the fifth internal party election to elect the next leader of the Scottish Conservatives, part of the British Conservative Party and the second-largest political party in the devolved Scottish Parliament.

Douglas Ross was announced as Leader on 5 August 2020 after running unopposed.

== Background ==
On 30 July 2020, Jackson Carlaw resigned as leader of the Scottish Conservatives after he said that he wasn't the right person to lead Scotland's voice in the union. At the time, support for Scottish independence was rising and the SNP had a substantial lead in the polls ahead of the upcoming Scottish Parliament elections in 2021.

The previous leader of the Scottish Conservatives, Ruth Davidson, agreed to represent the party at First Minister's Questions until a replacement leader was chosen, and until the 2021 Scottish Parliament election if the new leader was not a current MSP, at which point she would stand down to take up her seat in the House of Lords.

== Campaign ==
Douglas Ross, the Member of Parliament (MP) for Moray confirmed his intention to run for the leadership on 31 July. He was immediately endorsed by Ruth Davidson, a former leader of the Scottish Conservatives, and the former Scottish Secretary David Mundell. Ross also said he intended to stand as a Member of the Scottish Parliament (MSP) on the Highlands and Islands regional list if elected, while continuing to represent Moray in Westminster. Carlaw said that Ross's election should not be contested.

== Candidates ==
Candidate	Born	Political office	Campaign	Ref.
Douglas Ross	27 January 1983 (age 43)	MP for Moray (since 2017); MSP for Highlands and Islands (2016–2017); Parliamentary Under-Secretary of State for Scotland (2019–2020)	Campaign	

== Timeline ==
- 30 July: Jackson Carlaw resigns as leader of the Scottish Conservatives.
- 31 July: Douglas Ross declares his intention to stand as leader.
- 5 August: Nominations close, Douglas Ross is declared leader as no other candidates declared.

== Endorsements ==
=== Douglas Ross ===
MSPs

- Jackson Carlaw, former leader of the Scottish Conservatives, MSP for Eastwood
- Ruth Davidson, former leader of the Scottish Conservatives, MSP for Edinburgh Central
- Michelle Ballantyne, MSP for South Scotland
- Adam Tomkins, MSP for Glasgow
- Annie Wells, MSP for Glasgow
- Alison Harris, MSP for Central Scotland
- Maurice Golden, MSP for West Scotland
- Gordon Lindhurst, MSP for Lothian
- Oliver Mundell, MSP for Dumfriesshire
- John Scott, MSP for Ayr
- Brian Whittle, MSP for South Scotland
- Margaret Mitchell, MSP for Central Scotland

MPs

- Andrew Bowie MP for West Aberdeenshire and Kincardine
- John Lamont, MP for Berwickshire, Roxburgh and Selkirk
- David Duguid, MP for Banff and Buchan

== See also ==
- February 2020 Scottish Conservative Party leadership election
- 2021 Scottish Parliament election
