= Jackson Carlaw =

Scottish politician (born 1959)

Jackson Carlaw CBE
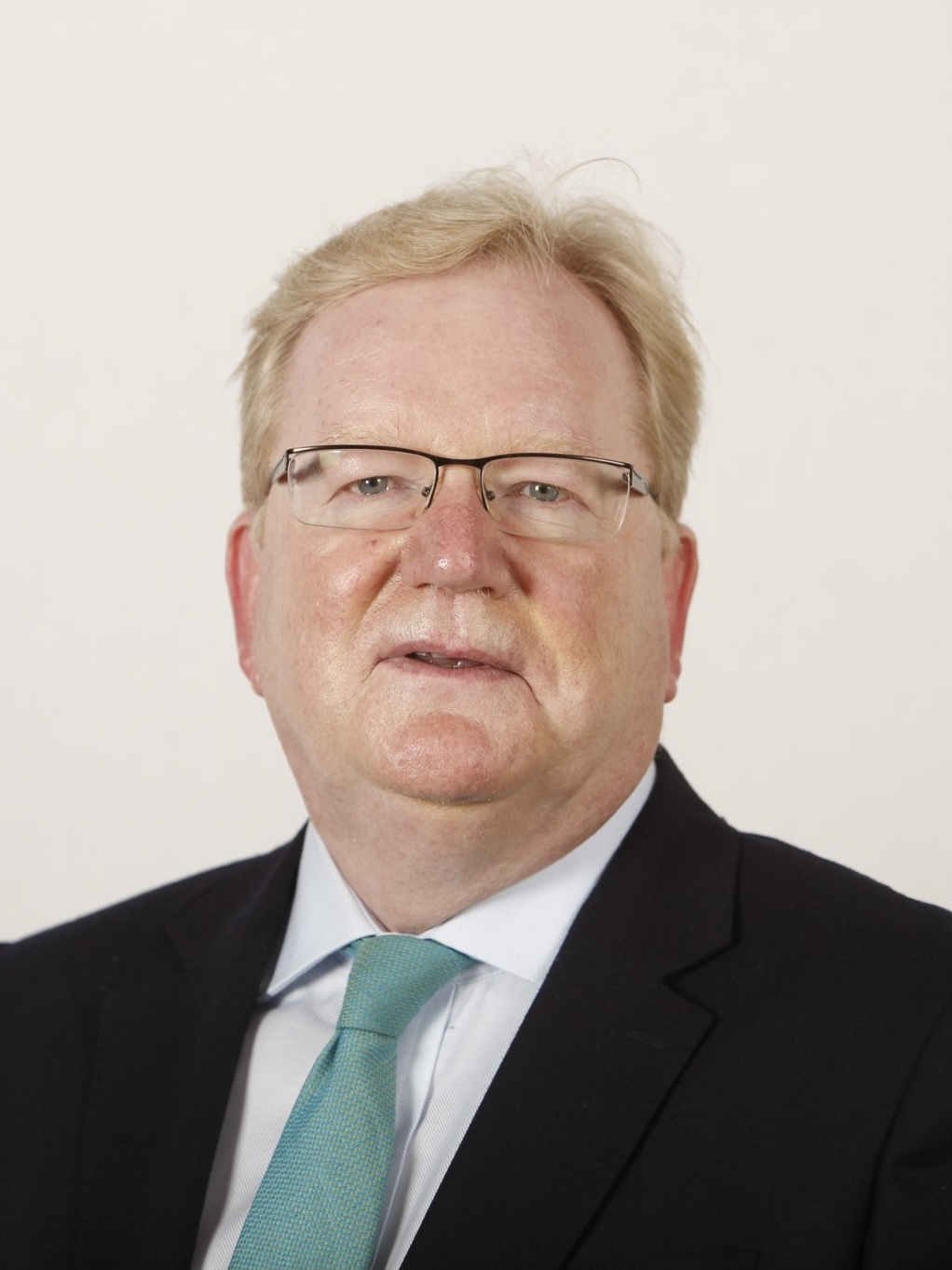
- Official portrait, 2016

Leader of the Scottish Conservative Party
- In office 14 February 2020 – 30 July 2020 (Note: Acting: 29 August 2019 – 14 February 2020.)
- Deputy: Liam Kerr; Annie Wells
- UK party leader: Boris Johnson
- Preceded by: Ruth Davidson
- Succeeded by: Douglas Ross

Deputy Leader of the Scottish Conservative Party
- In office 10 November 2011 – 3 September 2019
- Leader: Ruth Davidson
- Preceded by: Murdo Fraser
- Succeeded by: Liam Kerr

Member of the Scottish Parliament for Eastwood
- In office 5 May 2016 – 9 April 2026
- Preceded by: Ken Macintosh
- Succeeded by: Kirsten Oswald

Member of the Scottish Parliament for West Scotland (1 of 7 regional MSPs)
- In office 3 May 2007 – 24 March 2016

Scottish Conservative portfolios
- 2016–2020: Shadow Cabinet Secretary for Europe and External Affairs
- 2016–2017: Shadow Cabinet Secretary for Culture and Tourism

Personal details
- Born: David Jackson Carlaw; 12 April 1959 (age 67) Newton Mearns, East Renfrewshire, Scotland
- Party: Scottish Conservatives
- Children: 2
- Education: The Glasgow Academy
- Website: www.jacksoncarlaw.org.uk

David Jackson Carlaw CBE (born 12 April 1959) is a Scottish politician who served as Leader of the Scottish Conservative Party from February to July 2020, having acted in the position since August 2019. He previously served as Deputy Leader of the Scottish Conservative Party from 2011 to 2019. He became a Member of the Scottish Parliament (MSP) in 2007, first as an additional member for the West Scotland region and later for the Eastwood constituency from 2016 until the 2026 Scottish Parliament election, when he lost his seat.

Raised in Newton Mearns, Carlaw worked as a car salesman after education at The Glasgow Academy. Elected to the Scottish Parliament on the West of Scotland regional list in 2007 and 2011, he was elected as Deputy Leader of the Scottish Conservative Party in the 2011 deputy leadership election. He was subsequently made Scottish Conservative Spokesperson for Health and Sport. He was elected to the constituency of Eastwood in 2016, which had contested previously in 2003, 2007, and 2011, and following the election was made Shadow Cabinet Secretary for Europe and External Affairs and Shadow Cabinet Secretary for Culture and Tourism.

Carlaw served as acting Leader of the Scottish Conservative Party from September 2018 to May 2019 during Ruth Davidson's maternity leave and from August 2019 to February 2020 following Davidson's resignation as leader. He was elected Scottish Conservative leader in the February 2020 leadership election, winning more than three-quarters of votes from party members. He resigned the leadership in July 2020, stating he was not the person best placed to lead the party into the 2021 Scottish Parliament election.

== Early life and career ==
Carlaw was raised in Newton Mearns and privately educated at The Glasgow Academy. He worked for 25 years as a car salesman and was joint head of FirstFord car dealership in the west of Scotland until it was placed into receivership in November 2002. He was also a director of Wylies automotive services until it went into administration in February 2003.

== Political career ==
Carlaw joined the East Renfrewshire Conservatives in 1978. He was the Conservative candidate in the 1982 Queen's Park by-election, and in the 1983 general election in Glasgow Pollok. He was Chairman of the Scottish Young Conservatives from 1984 to 1986, Chairman of Eastwood Conservatives from 1988 to 1992, and was Deputy Chairman of the Scottish Conservatives from 1992 to 1998. He was reappointed Deputy Chairman of the Scottish Conservatives in 2005.

In the run-up to the 1997 Scottish devolution referendum Carlaw campaigned against the formation of a devolved Scottish Parliament alongside the Scottish Conservatives and the Think Twice campaign, advocating a No vote for both the question of the parliament's formation and whether the parliament should be granted tax-varying powers.

Carlaw was unsuccessful as a candidate for Eastwood in the 2003, 2007, and 2011 Scottish Parliament elections. He was, however, elected on the party list under Scotland's additional member system in 2007 and 2011, representing the West of Scotland region. He sat on the Culture, Tourism, Europe and External Relations Committee of the Scottish Parliament until mid-2018.

In 2011, Carlaw stood as a candidate in the leadership election brought on by Annabel Goldie's resignation. During the campaign, he was hospitalised with appendicitis. Carlaw finished third behind Ruth Davidson and Murdo Fraser. He was appointed as Deputy Leader of the Scottish Conservative Party and Scottish Conservative Spokesperson for Health and Sport by Davidson following her victory.

Carlaw became MSP for Eastwood in 2016, after defeating the incumbent Ken Macintosh. He was re-appointed as of 28 June 2017 as Shadow Cabinet Secretary for Europe and External Affairs and Shadow Cabinet Secretary for Culture and Tourism. He supported remain during the 2016 EU referendum. In September 2016, he was elected Convener of the Scottish Parliament's Cross Party Group on Building Bridges with Israel, the establishment of which he pledged to help in his 2016 election campaign.

Carlaw opposed the SNP's changes to council tax in November 2016, believing the proposed changes would effectively put over 50% of property in East Renfrewshire in the top two council tax bands. Commenting against the decision, he maintained "the rise would unfairly hit working families and the elderly" and "will hit Eastwood residents hard".

In February 2017, Carlaw was appointed Deputy Convener of the Cross Party Group on End-of-life Choices.

Following an attempt in March 2017 by the SNP to hold a second Scottish independence referendum, Carlaw spoke against the attempt, describing it as "pointless" and unwanted". He pledged the Scottish Conservatives would not allow for a further referendum until the Scottish public showed clear support.

== Leader of the Scottish Conservatives ==
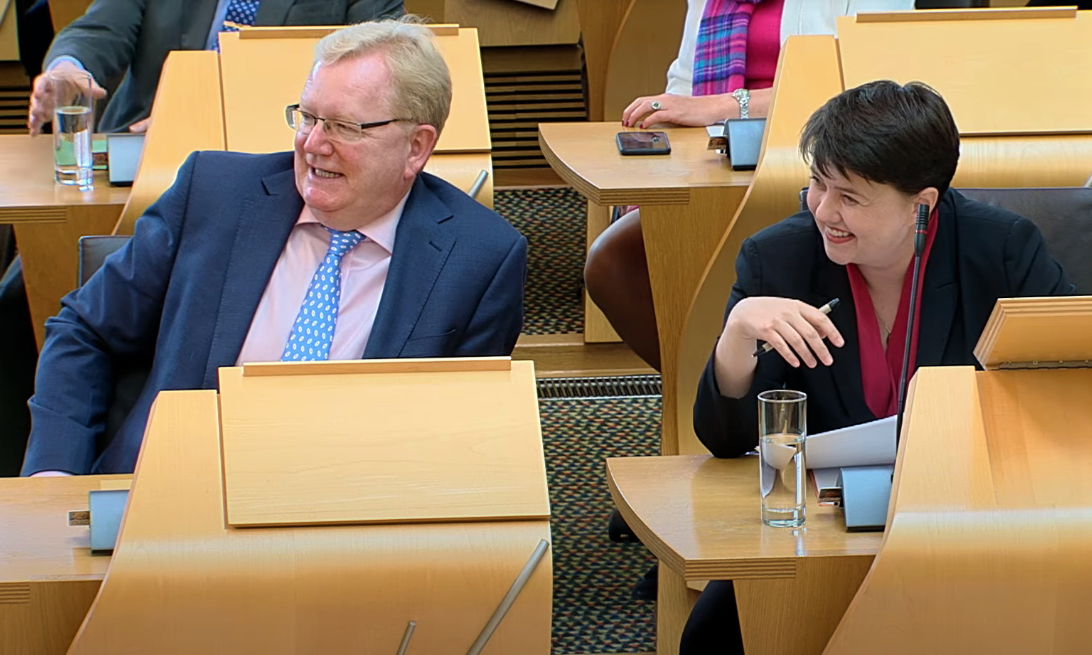
Carlaw (left) and Ruth Davidson (right) on the Scottish Conservative frontbench in 2018

Carlaw served as acting leader of the Scottish Conservatives while leader Ruth Davidson was on maternity leave from September 2018 until May 2019. Following her resignation in August 2019, he was appointed to serve a second term. In his role as acting leader, he supported Brexit and u-turned on criticisms of Prime Minister and Conservative leader Boris Johnson. He was the incumbent when Johnson called the 2019 general election, in which the party lost seven of their 13 seats from 2017.

On 6 January 2020, Carlaw confirmed his candidacy for the February 2020 Scottish Conservative Party leadership election and launched his campaign in Edinburgh on 15 January. He received support from Ruth Davidson, Murdo Fraser, Adam Tomkins, Liz Smith, Annie Wells and Jamie Greene. This gave Carlaw the position of favourite over his opponent Michelle Ballantyne. He centred his campaign around how he could beat Nicola Sturgeon and the SNP in the next Scottish Parliament election and the local elections in 2022. He also promised to make the Scottish Conservatives more for the middle and working classes and continue to maintain the Scottish Conservatives as the main party of the Union. Carlaw won the election with 4,917 votes in his favour, as opposed to 1,581 for Ballantyne. He promised to provide a "clear, focused and ambitious alternative to the SNP".

During the COVID-19 pandemic, the Scottish Greens accused Carlaw in June 2020 of claiming an "outright falsehood" when he said the Scottish Parliament could be opened up quickly in order to hold the SNP government to account. He initially supported the position of Boris Johnson to stick by Downing Street adviser Dominic Cummings after alleged lockdown breaches but withdrew his support following criticism from leading figures in the Scottish party.

On 30 July 2020, Carlaw announced his resignation as Leader of the Scottish Conservatives, stating he had reached the "simple if painful conclusion" he was not "the person best placed" to lead the party into the next Scottish Parliament election, in 2021. He was succeeded by Douglas Ross.

== Post-leadership ==
At the 2021 Scottish Parliament election, Carlaw was re-elected as MSP for Eastwood with an increased majority of 2,216 votes over the SNP, with his share of the vote increasing by 6.2%. Polling expert John Curtice put Carlaw's victory down to tactical voting by unionist voters who had voted Labour in 2016.

In December 2022, Carlaw was found to have breached the MSP code of conduct by not declaring a paid trip to Israel that was funded by the Israeli Embassy.

At the 2026 Scottish Parliament election, Carlaw lost his seat to Kirsten Oswald of the SNP, which saw his share of the vote drop by 10.6%. He was placed second on the regional ballot, behind party leader Russell Findlay, but was not elected.

== Personal life ==
Carlaw lives in Waterfoot, East Renfrewshire. He is married and has two sons.

== Notes ==
Scottish Parliament
| Preceded by Ken Macintosh | Member of the Scottish Parliament for Eastwood; 2016–2026 | Succeeded by Kirsten Oswald |
Party political offices
| Preceded by Ruth Davidson | Leader of the Scottish Conservative Party; 2020 | Succeeded by Douglas Ross |
| Preceded by | Deputy Chairman of the Scottish Conservative Party; 1992–1998 | Succeeded by Annabel Goldie |
| Preceded by Murdo Fraser | Deputy Leader of the Scottish Conservative Party; 2011–2019 | Succeeded by Annie Wells; Liam Kerr |
