= Maurice Golden =

Scottish Conservative politician

Maurice Golden FRSA
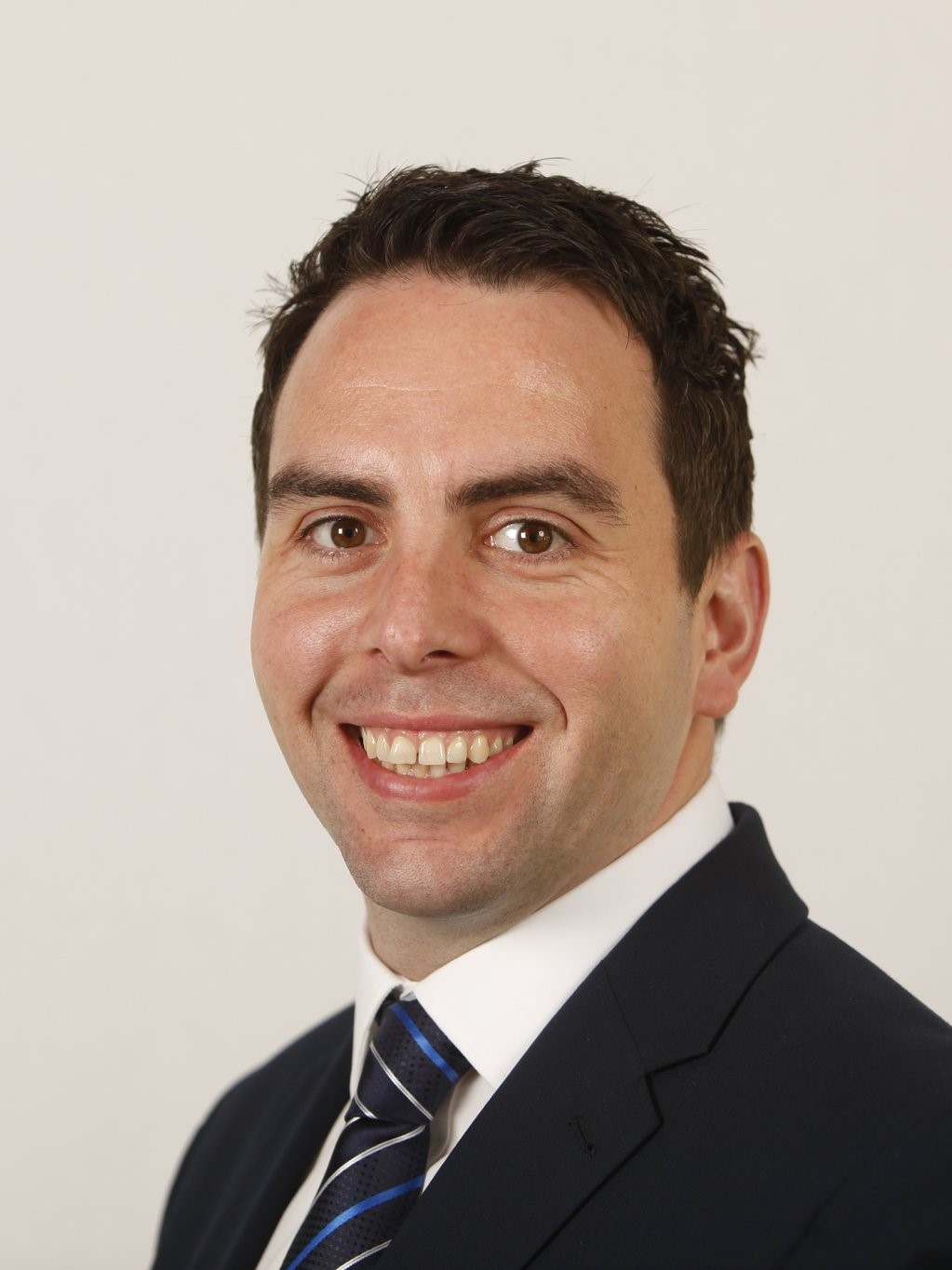
- Official portrait, 2016

Shadow Cabinet Secretary for Economy, Fair Work and Culture
- In office 18 February 2020 – 20 May 2021
- Leader: Jackson Carlaw; Douglas Ross
- Preceded by: Dean Lockhart

Chief Whip of the Scottish Conservative Party
- In office 28 June 2017 – 14 February 2020
- Leader: Ruth Davidson
- Preceded by: John Lamont
- Succeeded by: Liz Smith

Shadow Cabinet Secretary for Environment, Climate Change and Land Reform
- In office 19 May 2016 – 28 June 2017
- Leader: Ruth Davidson
- Preceded by: Sarah Boyack
- Succeeded by: Donald Cameron

Member of the Scottish Parliament for North East Scotland (1 of 7 Regional MSPs)
- In office 6 May 2021 – 9 April 2026

Member of the Scottish Parliament for West Scotland (1 of 7 Regional MSPs)
- In office 6 May 2016 – 5 May 2021

Personal details
- Born: Maurice Charles Golden; 12 January 1980 (age 46) Dundee, Scotland
- Party: Scottish Liberal Democrats (since 2026)
- Other political affiliations: Scottish Conservatives (1998–2026)
- Education: University of Dundee
- Website: Website

Maurice Charles Golden (born 12 January 1980) is a Scottish politician. He served as a Member of the Scottish Parliament (MSP) for the North East Scotland region from 2021 to 2026, having previously been elected in 2016 for West Scotland. He sat as a MSP for the Scottish Conservatives

Golden was the Shadow Cabinet Secretary for Economy, Fair Work and Culture until May 2021. He was also previously Chief Whip and Business Manager.

== Early life and education ==
Golden attended Gowriehill Primary School, the High School of Dundee and the University of Dundee from 1997 until 2001, and graduated with an MA (Honours) degree in Economics before going on to complete an MPhil in urban and cultural history and an LLM in Environmental Law. In 2010, Golden received qualification from the Chartered Institution of Wastes Management.

Golden has experience in the waste and energy sectors, previously working for Ofgem and Consumer Focus as well as with Local Authorities advising on kerbside collections. He led the Circular Economy Programme for Zero Waste Scotland after 2011.

== Political career ==
Golden joined the Conservative Party since 1998. Golden stood for the Local Authority Elections in Dundee in Sidlaw West in 2002. He worked as a Campaign Manager for Douglas Taylor in the Perth and North Perthshire constituency in 2005. He stood for the Scottish Parliament in 2007 as the Conservative candidate for Central Fife. He was selected as the Conservative Party candidate in the Glenrothes by-election for the Westminster Parliament in 2008, securing third place as Labour retained the seat. Two years later Golden secured second place in Central Ayrshire with 8,934 votes after standing in the 2010 UK General Election. In 2011, Golden stood for election to the Scottish Parliament in the Cunninghame North constituency.

=== Member of the Scottish Parliament ===
In 2016, Golden stood for the Scottish Parliament as the Conservative candidate for Clydebank and Milngavie where he took third place with 6,029 votes (18.4%). Having not won the constituency, he was elected from the West Scotland regional list. Golden was the Chief Whip and Business Manager, and Spokesperson for the Low Carbon Economy in the Parliament.

At the 2021 Scottish Parliament election, Golden sought re-election as a list candidate for the North East Scotland region. Additionally, he ran in the Angus South constituency, finishing second with 34.8% of the vote. On the regional list, the Conservatives retained their four seats, with Golden being re-elected.

In 2023, Golden voted against a Conservative amendment during a debate on climate change. This was due to an objection over the watering down of climate pledges made by his party.

Golden has pushed for a Members' Bill to tackle dog theft. The proposed law would make it a specific offence to steal a dog. His Bill received unanimous backing from the Parliament at stage one in October 2025.

In April 2025, Golden announced that he would not stand in the 2026 Scottish Parliament election. Later that year he said that he would have "struggled" to stand for the party and that under the leadership of Russell Findlay it had "moved so far away from where [it was when] I started" by adopting a more populist stance.

== Post-political career ==
Following his retirement from Holyrood, Golden set up his own political consultancy. In July 2026, The Courier newspaper revealed that Golden was now advising MSPs from the Reform UK group, despite previously accusing his former party of "trying to out-Reform Reform". Golden clarified that he was helping to provide “political intelligence” for the rookie group of 17 MSPs, and did not get involved in Reform's political campaigning or messaging.

In October 2026, it was reported that he had defected to the Scottish Liberal Democrats and was seeking a candidacy for the next general election.

== Personal life ==
In 2016, Golden was made a fellow of the Royal Society for the Encouragement of Arts, Manufactures and Commerce.
