= Murdo Fraser =

Scottish Conservative politician

Murdo Fraser MSP
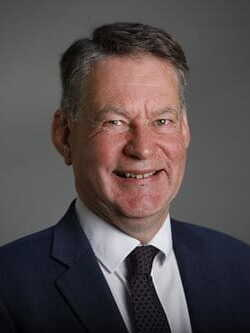
- Official portrait, 2026

Deputy Convener of the Public Audit Committee
- In office 20 June 2007 – 6 May 2016
- Preceded by: Andrew Welsh
- Succeeded by: Alison Harris

Deputy Leader of the Scottish Conservative Party
- In office 31 October 2005 – 10 November 2011
- Leader: Annabel Goldie; Ruth Davidson
- Preceded by: Office established
- Succeeded by: Jackson Carlaw

Member of the Scottish Parliament for Mid Scotland and Fife (1 of 7 Regional MSPs)
- Incumbent
- Assumed office 10 August 2001

Scottish Conservative Shadow portfolios
- Leader: Ruth Davidson; Jackson Carlaw; Douglas Ross; Russell Findlay
- 2023–present: Cabinet Secretary for Business, Economic Growth and Tourism
- 2021–2023: Cabinet Secretary for Covid Recovery
- 2016–Feb 2020; Aug 2020–2021: Cabinet Secretary for Finance

Personal details
- Born: Murdo MacKenzie Fraser; 5 September 1965 (age 61) Inverness, Scotland
- Party: Scottish Conservatives
- Education: University of Aberdeen
- Occupation: Solicitor
- Website: Official Website

Murdo MacKenzie Fraser (born 5 September 1965) is a Scottish politician who served as Deputy Leader of the Scottish Conservative Party from 2005 to 2011. He has been a Member of the Scottish Parliament (MSP) for the Mid Scotland and Fife region since 2001. As of 2024, he serves as Shadow Cabinet Secretary for Business, Economic Growth and Tourism, shadowing Deputy First Minister Kate Forbes.

== Early life ==
Born in 1965, Fraser was educated at Inverness Royal Academy. He studied law at the University of Aberdeen, and was chairman of the Scottish Young Conservatives from 1989 to 1992. During this time, a plaque marking a TV lounge that had been named to honour Nelson Mandela, was "appropriated" as a prank to annoy left-wing students. In 2016, Fraser said he returned the plaque to students, although Aberdeen University Student Association disputes the claim.

After undertaking a postgraduate Diploma in Legal Studies, he worked as a solicitor in Aberdeen and Edinburgh, latterly as an associate with Ketchen and Stevens WS in Edinburgh, specialising in commercial law.

== Political career ==
At the 1999 Scottish Parliament election, Fraser was an unsuccessful candidate for North Tayside, as he was in 2003 and 2007. He stood unsuccessfully for the House of Commons at the 1997 general election in East Lothian and at the 2001 general election in North Tayside.

Fraser became an MSP in 2001, after the resignation of Nick Johnston, as next name on the Conservative Party's Mid Scotland and Fife list. He gained a list seat in 2003, 2007, 2011, 2016 and 2021, having lost to John Swinney on each occasion in the constituency vote. Previously the convenor of the Economy, Energy, and Tourism Committee, Fraser is a member of the Finance Committee of the Scottish Parliament.

He became deputy leader of the Scottish Conservatives in November 2005 when Annabel Goldie became leader. After the 2011 election, at which 15 Conservative MSPs were elected, Annabel Goldie triggered a leadership election by announcing that she would stand down in Autumn 2011.

In June 2014, Fraser spoke in favour of reconstituting the United Kingdom on a federal basis.

=== Party leadership election 2011 ===
After being elected through the party list in 2011, he announced in August his decision to seek the leadership of the Scottish Conservative Party, and launched his campaign on 4 September in Edinburgh. His launch plans included a commitment to further devolution to the Scottish Parliament from Westminster, as well as launching a new party to redefine the politics of Scotland, harnessing the support of the centre-right, but independent of the UK Conservative Party and with a new name and identity. Fraser was unsuccessful in his attempt to be elected party leader, losing out to Ruth Davidson, and following the election was succeeded as deputy leader by Jackson Carlaw.

=== Party leadership election 2024 ===
Fraser announced his candidacy on 7 August. Fraser said that the UK-wide Conservative Party could stand candidates in Westminster elections but a new sister party could stand in Holyrood elections, citing the party system in Canada, with a commission established that would report after the 2026 Scottish Parliament election. He said recent UK Conservative leaders and Douglas Ross had "let down" members. On 14 August, MSP Stephen Kerr accidentally published doubts about Murdo Fraser's campaign as a status update on WhatsApp, calling it "awful". Kerr had endorsed Fraser, but published that he was "beginning to wish" he had nominated Gallacher. Kerr said the comments were out of context, and reiterated his support for Fraser.

On 22 August, Fraser launched his campaign to become Scottish Conservative Party Leader at an event in Perth with two former rival candidates, Jamie Greene and Brian Whittle. He said that the remaining candidates, Russell Findlay and Meghan Gallacher should withdraw from the election and support him. He said he would appeal to conservative nationalists disillusioned by the SNP by offering "practical solutions".

He was re-elected list MSP for Mid Scotland and Fife in the 2026 Scottish Parliament election.
