= Liam Kerr =

Scottish politician (born 1975)

Liam Kerr MSP
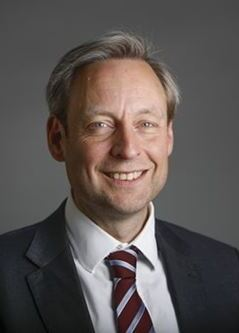
- Official portrait, 2026

Deputy Leader of the Scottish Conservative Party
- In office 3 September 2019 – 12 August 2020 Serving with Annie Wells
- Leader: Jackson Carlaw
- Preceded by: Jackson Carlaw
- Succeeded by: Meghan Gallacher (Note: Office vacant between 12 August 2020 and 9 May 2022.)

Member of the Scottish Parliament for North East Scotland (1 of 7 Regional MSPs)
- Incumbent
- Assumed office 6 May 2016

Scottish Conservative Shadow portfolios
- 2023–present: Shadow Cabinet Secretary for Education and Skills
- 2021–2023: Shadow Cabinet Secretary for Net Zero, Energy and Transport
- 2017–2021: Shadow Cabinet Secretary for Justice

Personal details
- Born: Matthew Liam Philip Kerr; 23 January 1975 (age 51) Chester, Cheshire, England
- Party: Scottish Conservatives
- Education: University of St Andrews; University of Edinburgh; University of Law
- Occupation: Solicitor
- Website: Official Website

Liam Kerr (born 23 January 1975) is a British politician who served as Deputy Leader of the Scottish Conservative Party from 2019 to 2020 and as the Scottish Conservatives’ Shadow Cabinet Secretary for Justice from 2017 to 2021. Kerr has served as Shadow Cabinet Secretary for Education and Skills since 2023 and as a Member of the Scottish Parliament (MSP) for the North East Scotland region since 2016.

== Early life and education ==
Liam Kerr grew up in Edinburgh, and was educated at George Watson's College, the University of St Andrews and the University of Edinburgh, where he graduated with a MA (Hons.) degree in Sociology in 1997. Having spent time employed as a chef in an Edinburgh restaurant, upon finishing his education he moved to London, working as a session musician and as a salesman in the telecoms industry. He then studied at the College of Law (now the University of Law), gaining a Common Professional Examination award in 2000 and a Legal Practice Certificate the following year.

== Career ==
Initially training as a lawyer with a firm based on the south coast of England, Kerr moved to Aberdeen in 2004 and became an employment lawyer. During his time at Aberdeen, he has given lectures at Robert Gordon University and the University of Aberdeen, been a director of two charities, and performed classical and jazz piano.

Kerr has been an accredited specialist employment lawyer since 2015. Prior to his election, he operated his own practice.

He is a member and former chairman of the Aberdeen 100 Round Table, and a former member of St Fittick Rotary club.

== Politics ==
Kerr is the Scottish Conservatives' Shadow Cabinet Secretary for Justice. He served as Deputy Leader of the Scottish Conservative Party, alongside Annie Wells, under Jackson Carlaw. However, they both were dismissed and the post was abolished shortly after Douglas Ross became Scottish Conservative leader in August 2020.

In 2016, he stood for the Scottish Parliament as the Conservative candidate in Aberdeen Donside, coming second to the SNP's Mark McDonald, then was elected on the regional list.

In June 2017, Kerr was appointed by the Scottish Conservatives as their for spokesperson for Justice in the Scottish Parliament. He sits on the Justice Committee and is deputy convenor of the Public Audit and Post-legislative Scrutiny Committee.

In the 2021 Scottish election Kerr stood for the Aberdeen South and North Kincardine seat and came second to the SNP's Audrey Nicoll.

Kerr lodged a confidence motion against Green minister Lorna Slater in 2023, claiming that she had mismanaged the Deposit Return Scheme (a container return scheme which she had ministerial responsibility for). Slater survived the vote which saw 55 MSPs vote in favour of the motion, including SNP MSP Fergus Ewing, and 68 vote against.

In the 2026 Scottish parliament election, he stood as the Conservative candidate in Aberdeen Deeside and North Kincardine, coming a narrow second to the SNP's leader in the House of Commons, Stephen Flynn, but was elected on the regional list for North East Scotland.
