= Miles Briggs =

Scottish Conservative politician

Miles Briggs MSP
- Official portrait, 2026

Chief Whip of the Scottish Conservative Party
- In office 11 August 2020 – 11 May 2021
- Leader: Douglas Ross
- Preceded by: Liz Smith
- Succeeded by: Stephen Kerr

Member of the Scottish Parliament for Edinburgh and Lothians East (1 of 7 Regional MSPs) Lothian (2016–2026)
- Incumbent
- Assumed office 5 May 2016

Personal details
- Born: Miles Edward Frank Briggs; 30 March 1983 (age 43) Preston, Lancashire, England
- Party: Scottish Conservatives
- Education: Robert Gordon University
- Website: www.milesbriggs.scot

Miles Edward Frank Briggs (born 30 March 1983) is a British politician of the Scottish Conservative Party, who has served as a regional list Member of the Scottish Parliament (MSP) for the Edinburgh and Lothians East region since the 2026 Scottish Parliament election. He previously represented the Lothian region from the 2016 Scottish Parliament election until its abolition in 2026. He served as the Scottish Conservative Shadow Cabinet member for Health and Sport from 2017 to 2020 and as the Scottish Conservative Chief Whip from 2020 to 2021.

== Early life and early career ==
Briggs was born in Preston, Lancashire in England, before moving to Perthshire with his family when he was young. Briggs was educated at Auchtergaven Primary School, Perth Grammar School and Robert Gordon University, where he studied Management and Politics.

Following graduation Briggs worked for The Executive Council of the Province of Prince Edward Island, Canada. He then spent 10 years working as a Political Adviser to MSPs Nanette Milne and Liz Smith.

== Political career ==
Briggs was the official Conservative Party candidate at the 2010 general election for the North East Fife constituency, then in the 2011 Scottish Parliament election for North East Fife.

=== Member of the Scottish Parliament ===
In December 2015, Briggs was named second on the Scottish Conservatives' Lothian regional list in the 2016 Scottish Parliament election, behind party leader Ruth Davidson. He also stood in the Edinburgh Southern constituency, taking third place with 9,972 votes (26.1%). Davidson won election in the Edinburgh Central constituency, while Briggs was one of three successful Conservative candidates to be elected on the regional list.

Briggs is the Scottish Conservative spokesman for Mental Health and Public Health in the Scottish Parliament In addition, he sits on the Health and Sport Committee of the Scottish Parliament.

Briggs was announced as the official Conservative Party candidate for Edinburgh South West at the 2017 general election. He finished in second place, and received 16,478 votes, behind the sitting SNP MP, Joanna Cherry. Despite not being elected, Briggs was successful in significantly reducing Cherry's majority from 8,135 votes at the previous election, to just 1,097 votes.

In March 2021, Briggs lodged a motion of no confidence in Deputy First Minister John Swinney over allegations that he had failed to provide the committee investigating the Scottish Government's handling of harassment complaints made against Alex Salmond with all of the legal documentation they had requested. The motion was defeated by 57 votes in favour to 65 against.

At the 2021 Scottish Parliament election, Briggs stood again in Edinburgh Southern, retaining third place, with a reduced vote share of 11.6%. He was the lead candidate on the party list in Lothian, and was re-elected as a regional member.

On 12 January 2022, Briggs called for Boris Johnson to resign as Conservative party leader and Prime Minister over the Westminster lockdown parties controversy along with a majority of Scottish Conservative MSPs.

In May 2025, in preparation for the 2026 Scottish Parliament election, Briggs was selected as the Conservative candidate for the redrawn East Lothian Coast and Lammermuirs seat, sitting in the new Edinburgh and Lothians East.

== Controversy ==
In 2018, Briggs was accused by a woman from another political party of sexual harassment at a parliamentary event. After an internal investigation, the Scottish Conservatives found Briggs not guilty of making "unwanted persistent advances" towards the woman. Women's rights charity Rape Crisis Scotland voiced "significant concerns" with how the investigation was conducted and called on the Scottish Conservatives to change the way they investigate claims of sexual harassment. The charity claimed that the party would not reveal whether the investigating committee had received training in how to investigate sexual harassment complaints.

== Personal life ==
Outside of politics, Briggs is a keen hill walker, having completed 83 Munros, and is also interested in rugby, countryside issues, photography, Scottish history and music.

Briggs resides in south east Edinburgh.

He has a sister and two nephews.
