= Jamie Greene =

Scottish Liberal Democrat politician

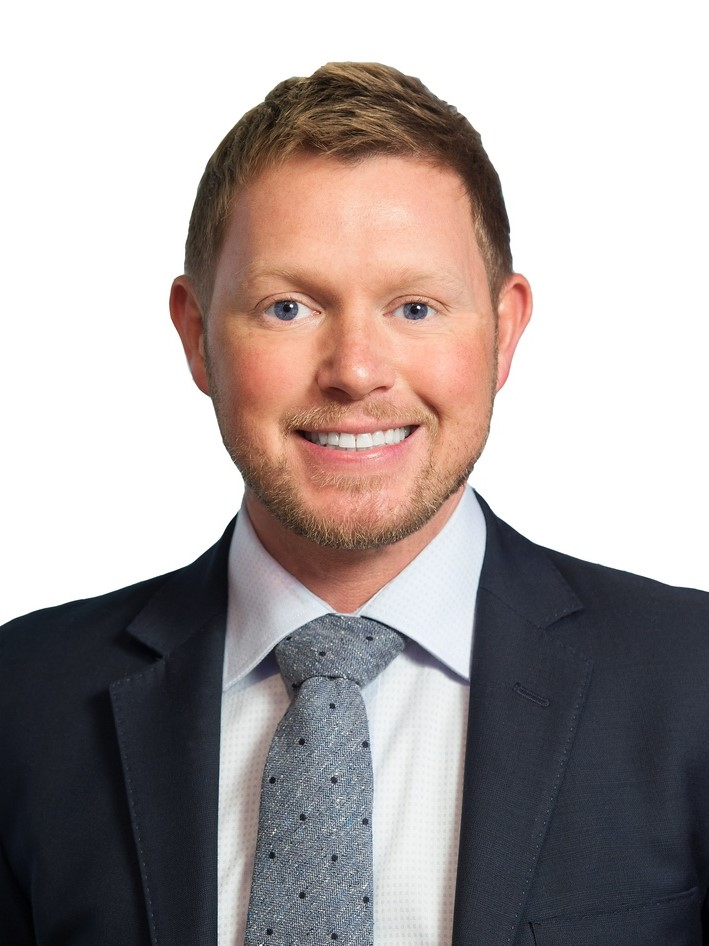
- Official portrait, 2016

Member of the Scottish Parliament for West Scotland (1 of 7 Regional MSPs)
- In office 5 May 2016 – 9 April 2026

Scottish Conservative portfolios
- 2020–2021: Shadow Cabinet Secretary for Education and Skills
- 2021–2023: Shadow Cabinet Secretary for Justice

Personal details
- Born: 19 March 1980 (age 46) Greenock, Scotland
- Party: Scottish Liberal Democrats (since 2025); Scottish Conservatives (until 2025)
- Website: http://www.jamiegreene.uk/

Jamie Gillan Greene (born 19 March 1980) is a Scottish politician who served as a Member of the Scottish Parliament (MSP) for the West Scotland region from 2016 to 2026. Now a Liberal Democrat, Greene was a member of the Scottish Conservatives until April 2025.

== Early life and career ==
Greene was born in Greenock, Inverclyde, and holds dual British and Canadian citizenship. He was educated at James Watt College in the town. Prior to his election he worked in the broadcast, media and digital technology industries, most recently as head of UK Business development for the multinational broadcast network Viacom International.

== Political career ==
In the 2015 United Kingdom general election, Greene stood for the UK Parliament as the Conservative candidate for North Ayrshire and Arran where he came third.

=== Member of the Scottish Parliament ===
In 2016, Greene stood for the Scottish Parliament as the Conservative candidate for the Cunninghame North constituency where he came second, then as second on the West Scotland regional list for the Scottish Conservatives. He stood again in 2021, achieving 10,451 votes, an increase of 3.5% from the 2016 election, though failed to be elected. He was instead reelected on the West Scotland regional list.

Greene was appointed as Shadow Cabinet Secretary for Justice in the current term of Parliament, later replaced by Russell Findlay in a reshuffle, and previously served as Shadow Cabinet Secretary for Education and Skills and Shadow Cabinet Secretary for Transport, Infrastructure and Connectivity.

He is Deputy Convenor of the Public Audit Committee and Deputy Chair of the Scottish Commission for Public Audit, a non-parliamentary board which oversees Audit Scotland.

Prior to this he held roles as the Scottish Conservative spokesperson for transport and infrastructure, technology, connectivity and the digital economy as well as digital broadcasting. He sat on the Education and Skills committee having previously sat on the Rural Economy and Connectivity Committee, the Equalities and Human Rights and Culture, Tourism, Europe and External Affairs Committees respectively of the Scottish Parliament.

After his election in Term 5 of the Scottish Parliament (2016–21) he also instigated and was Co-Convenor of the Scottish Parliaments' first Cross-Party-Group (CPG) on LGBTI+ issues. He is also Convenor of the CPG on Taiwan. An active member of the Commonwealth Parliamentary Association (CPA) he has represented the Scottish Parliament on a number of engagements serving in parliamentary training and election monitoring and observing functions.

Greene initially expressed an interest in standing for the 2020 Scottish Conservative & Unionist Party Leadership Election, but announced in January 2020 that he was dropping-out to support incumbent acting-leader Jackson Carlaw who was later replaced by Douglas Ross.

Greene announced that he would run in the Scottish Conservative Leadership election to replace Douglas Ross, who announced he would stand down after the 2024 General Election. Greene removed himself from the leadership contest prior to nominations closing and subsequently endorsed Murdo Fraser for the leadership.

==== Resignation from the Conservatives and subsequent activity ====
On 3 April 2025, Greene left the Conservative Party in protest of Russell Findlay's leadership, claiming the party had adopted a "Reform-esque agenda" and "Trump-esque narrative" under Findlay that risked marginalising the party as it abandoned the centre ground. The next day, Greene joined the Scottish Liberal Democrats. He was later appointed front-bench spokesperson for Finance and the Economy for the Liberal Democrats.

Greene sought election in the 2026 Scottish Parliament election. In October 2025, he was selected as the Liberal Democrat candidate for Inverclyde. On the regional list, Greene was placed second.

== Personal life ==
Greene is openly gay and heads Holyrood's LGBT+ Cross Party Group.

In his leisure time he has a keen interest in languages, music and for silversmithery.
