= Dean Lockhart =

Scottish Conservative politician

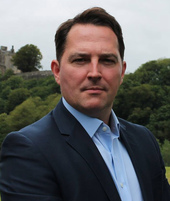
- Lockhart in 2016

Convener of the net zero, energy and transport committee
- In office 22 June 2021 – 5 September 2022
- Deputy: Fiona Hyslop
- Preceded by: Gordon Lindhurst
- Succeeded by: Edward Mountain

Scottish Conservative spokesperson for the constitution, Europe and external affairs
- In office 11 August 2020 – 1 June 2021
- Leader: Douglas Ross
- Preceded by: Murdo Fraser
- Succeeded by: Donald Cameron

Member of the Scottish Parliament for Mid Scotland and Fife (1 of 7 Regional MSPs)
- In office 6 May 2016 – 5 September 2022
- Succeeded by: Roz McCall

Personal details
- Born: Larkhall, Scotland
- Party: Scottish Conservatives
- Education: University of Glasgow
- Occupation: Politician, solicitor, finance, journalist
- Website: www.deanlockhart.com

Dean Lockhart is a Scottish former politician who was the convener of the net zero, energy and transport committee in the Scottish Parliament from 2021 to 2022. A member of the Scottish Conservative and Unionist Party, he was a member of the Scottish Parliament (MSP) for the Mid Scotland and Fife region from 2016 to 2022.

== Career ==
Born in Larkhall, South Lanarkshire, Lockhart attended his local primary and secondary schools before graduating from the University of Glasgow with a first class degree in law.

After graduating, he worked in the City of London for seven years, first as a financial journalist and then at a leading global law firm and separately at a leading global financial institution. He then moved to Asia and worked with businesses in Hong Kong, Singapore, Japan, China and India. He spent a year at the British Embassy in Manila as the first commercial secretary, promoting British business interests in the Philippines and South East Asia. In 2001, he was elected as a partner at the global law firm Linklaters, at that time becoming one of the youngest partners at the firm. He was also head of business development across Asia for Linklaters with responsibility for business development, client strategy and Asia-wide country plans.

== Scottish Parliament ==
In 2016, Lockhart stood for election to the Scottish Parliament as the Conservative candidate for Stirling where he came second, but was elected from the Mid Scotland and Fife regional list. In 2021, he again stood as the Scottish Conservative and Unionist candidate for Stirling where he came second, but was again elected from the Mid Scotland and Fife regional list.

During his time in the Scottish Parliament, Lockhart held the roles of shadow cabinet secretary for the economy, jobs and fair work (2016-2019) shadow cabinet secretary for infrastructure, transport and business (2019–20) and shadow cabinet secretary for the constitution, Europe and external affairs (2020-2021).

Lockhart convened the net zero, energy and transport committee in the Scottish Parliament.

Lockhart was also the convenor of the cross party groups (CPG) on Japan, China and the USA and the deputy convenor of the CPG on Germany.

Lockhart resigned from the Scottish Parliament in 2022 to pursue a career in business. He was replaced by Roz McCall.
