= Annie Wells (politician) =

Scottish Conservative politician

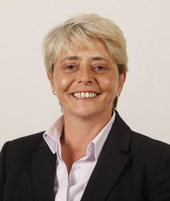
- Official portrait, 2016

Deputy Leader of the Scottish Conservative Party
- In office 14 February 2020 – 12 August 2020 Serving with Liam Kerr
- Leader: Jackson Carlaw
- Preceded by: Jackson Carlaw
- Succeeded by: Meghan Gallacher (Note: Office vacant between 12 August 2020 and 9 May 2022.)

Member of the Scottish Parliament for Glasgow (1 of 7 Regional MSPs)
- In office 5 May 2016 – 9 April 2026

Scottish Conservative portfolios
- Feb–Aug 2020: Shadow Cabinet Secretary for Environment, Climate Change and Land Reform
- 2020–2021: Shadow Cabinet Secretary for Communities and Local Government
- May–Sep 2021: Shadow Cabinet Secretary for Health and Social Care

Personal details
- Born: Carol Ann Wells; 24 February 1972 (age 54) Springburn, Glasgow, Scotland
- Party: Scottish Conservatives
- Occupation: Food retail manager
- Website: www.anniewells.org.uk

Carol Ann "Annie" Wells (born 24 February 1972) is a Scottish politician who served as Deputy Leader of the Scottish Conservative Party to Jackson Carlaw in 2020. She served as a Member of the Scottish Parliament (MSP) for the Glasgow region from 2016 to 2026.

The Deputy Leadership position was abolished on 12 August 2020, shortly after Douglas Ross was appointed Scottish Conservative Leader.

== Early life and career ==
Hailing from Springburn, Wells worked as a retail manager for Marks & Spencer in various locations throughout Glasgow for the 12 years leading up to her election.

== Political career ==
Wells became involved in politics during the 2014 Scottish Independence referendum by joining the Better Together campaign and stood as the Scottish Conservative candidate in Glasgow North East in the 2015 general election, finishing third with 4.7% of the vote. She also unsuccessfully contested the Glasgow Provan constituency at the 2016 Scottish Parliament election, finishing third with 8.6% of the vote, but was elected via the Glasgow regional list.

Shortly after her election, Wells was made Scottish Conservative Spokesperson for Welfare Reform and Equalities. She had a position on the Equal Opportunities Committee of the Scottish Parliament.

In late 2018, Wells was banned from Holyrood for leaking an embargoed committee report to the press. After a complaint was made that the MSP had "sought political advantage" by speaking out about prisoner voting before a report had been published, the parliament's standards committee unanimously ruled that Wells had breached the code of conduct for MSPs.

Wells served as Deputy Leader of the Scottish Conservative Party, alongside Liam Kerr, under Jackson Carlaw. However, they both were dismissed and the post was abolished when Douglas Ross became leader in August 2020.

On 12 January 2022, Wells called for Boris Johnson to resign as Conservative party leader and Prime Minister over the Westminster lockdown parties controversy along with a majority of Scottish Conservative MSPs.

In July 2022, she endorsed Penny Mordaunt in the Conservative Party leadership election.

Wells was the Conservative candidate for Rutherglen and Cambuslang in the 2026 Scottish Parliament election. She achieved 3.9% of the constituency vote. Although she was the top candidate in the Conservative regional list, their low vote share did not earn them any seats, which ended her time as a parliamentarian.

== Personal life ==
Wells is a single mother and is gay. She is a Manchester City F.C and a Rangers F.C fan.
