= Liz Smith (politician) =

Scottish Conservative politician

Liz Smith CBE
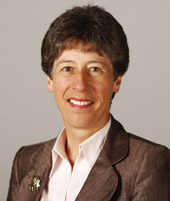
- Official portrait, 2011

Member of the Scottish Parliament for Mid Scotland and Fife (1 of 7 Regional MSPs)
- In office 3 May 2007 – 9 April 2026

Scottish Conservative Shadow portfolios
- 2023–2026: Shadow Cabinet Secretary for Finance and Local Government
- 2021–2023: Shadow Cabinet Secretary for Finance and the Economy
- 2020–2021: Shadow Cabinet Secretary for Environment, Climate Change and Land Reform
- Feb–Aug 2020: Chief Whip of the Scottish Conservative Party
- 2016–2020: Shadow Cabinet Secretary for Education and Skills

Personal details
- Born: Elizabeth Jane Smith; 27 February 1960 (age 66) Edinburgh, Scotland
- Party: Scottish Conservatives
- Education: University of Edinburgh
- Profession: Schoolteacher, Cricketer
- Cricket career

Cricket information
- Batting: Right-handed
- Bowling: Right-arm medium-fast

International information
- National side: Scotland (2001)
- ODI debut (cap 7): 10 August 2001 v England
- Last ODI: 12 August 2001 v Netherlands
- Source: Cricinfo, 22 September 2020

Elizabeth Jane Smith CBE (born 27 February 1960) is a Scottish politician who served as Member of the Scottish Parliament (MSP) for Mid Scotland and Fife from 2007 to 2026. A member of the Scottish Conservative Party, she served as Shadow Cabinet Secretary for Social Security from 2024 to 2026.

Before entering parliament, Smith was a schoolteacher and political researcher, as well as an amateur sportswoman, representing the Scottish women's cricket team. She was first elected in 2007 and re-elected in 2011 and 2016, having earlier stood unsuccessfully for the Parliament of the United Kingdom at the 2001 general election in the Perth constituency, where she missed out to the SNP by just 48 votes. She stood as a constituency candidate in the Perth constituency at the Scottish Parliament in 2007 and again in the newly established Perthshire South and Kinross-shire constituency in both 2011 and 2016, missing out by 1,422 votes in 2016. Smith served as Shadow Cabinet Secretary for Education and Skills from 2016 to 2020, after which she became Chief Whip, then served as Shadow Cabinet Secretary for Environment, Climate Change and Land Reform from 2020 to 2021 and Shadow Cabinet Secretary for Finance and Local Government until 2024.

== Early life and sporting career ==
Smith was born in Edinburgh, and attended George Watson's College before going on to the University of Edinburgh to study politics and economics and gain a Diploma in Education. After graduating, she returned to George Watson's College as a member of the staff, where she taught economics and modern studies. Smith left the teaching profession in 1997 to work as an advisor to Sir Malcolm Rifkind. Between 2001 and 2003, she worked at the Scottish Conservatives' central office, as head of the office of the chairman.

A keen sportswoman, Smith played club cricket for many years, but was not given an opportunity to play at a higher level until 2000, when the Scottish national side was reassembled for the first time since 1979. Her first match for the national team came against Cumbria, an English county team, but she neither batted nor bowled as her team cruised to a ten-wicket victory.

In 2001, Smith was selected in the Scottish squad for the 2001 European Championship, where matches held One Day International (ODI) status. On her international debut against England, she was 41 years and 164 days old, making her the fourth-oldest ODI debutant on record, and the oldest to debut since 1978. Smith made nine-ball ducks against both England and Ireland, and against the Netherlands.

Smith remains the oldest Scottish player, male or female, to appear in a full ODI. She has remained involved in promoting the sport since retiring, and in April 2014, following a reconstitution of the organisation, was elected the inaugural president of the Scottish Women's Cricket Association (SWCA), aligned with Cricket Scotland. Outside of cricket, Smith has an interest in mountaineering and hillwalking, having taken part in expeditions to the Alps and the Himalayas. After climbing Slioch in July 2012, she completed the feat of "bagging the Munros" (climbing every mountain in Scotland over a set height). She had begun the task in 1982, with a climb of Ben Nevis, and after entering parliament used her climbs to raise funds for charity.

Smith was appointed Commander of the Order of the British Empire (CBE) in the 2024 New Year Honours for services to sport.

== Political career ==
Smith was narrowly beaten (by just 48 votes) to the Perth seat at the 2001 General Election by the SNP's Annabelle Ewing. She made The Herald Scottish Politician of the Year shortlist for 'The One to Watch' in 2007. Smith acted as campaign manager for Murdo Fraser in his leadership election campaigns in 2011 and 2024.

=== Member of the Scottish Parliament ===
She was first elected to the Scottish Parliament for the Mid Scotland and Fife electoral region in 2007 and re-elected in 2011 and 2016, having earlier stood unsuccessfully for the Parliament of the United Kingdom at the 2001 UK general election in the Perth constituency, where she missed out to the SNP by just 48 votes. She stood as a constituency candidate in the Perth constituency at the Scottish Parliament in 2007 and again in the newly established Perthshire South and Kinross-shire constituency in both 2011 and 2016, missing out by 1,422 votes in 2016.

Smith is shadow cabinet secretary for Social Security. She is also the chair of the Parliament's Cross Party Group on Colleges and Universities, chair of the Cross Party Group on Sport and chair of the Cross Party Group on Outdoor Education.

Smith currently has a Member's Bill in Parliament which would deliver all children with the opportunity to experience residential outdoor education.

On 25 February 2025, Smith announced she would stand down at the 2026 Scottish Parliament election.

== Awards ==
- Parliamentary Awards Holyrood Magazine Political Hero of the Year 2024
- The Herald Politician of the Year 2023 - Campaigner of the Year
- The Herald Politician of the Year 2022 - Committee of the Year
