= Scottish Borders Council elections =

Local government elections in Scottish Borders, Scotland

Scottish Borders Council in Scotland holds elections every five years, previously holding them every four years from its creation as a single-tier authority in 1995 to 2007.

== Council elections ==
=== As a regional council ===
Year	Conservative	SNP	Liberal (Note: SDP–Liberal Alliance from 1981 to 1988, Liberal Democrats from 1988 onwards.)	Borders Independent	Independent
1974	7	0	3	0	13
1978	9	1	1	0	12 (Note: Includes 1 Independent Nationalist.)
1982 (Note: New ward boundaries.)	8	0	3	0	12
1986	6	1	2	1	13
1990	3	2	6	0	12
1994 (Note: New ward boundaries.)	2	6	8	0	11

=== As a unitary authority ===
Year	Conservative	SNP	Liberal Democrats	Green	Borders	Labour	Independent
1995	3	8	15	0	0	2	30
1999 (Note: New ward boundaries.)	1	4	14	0	0	1	14
2003	10	1	9	0	0	0	14
2007 (Note: Change to single transferable vote system and new ward boundaries.)	11	6	10	0	2	0	5
2012	10	9	6	0	2	0	7
2017 (Note: New ward boundaries.)	15	9	2	0	0	0	8
2022	14	9	3	1	0	0	7

== Results maps ==
1982 results map

1986 results map

2012 results map

2017 results map

== By-elections ==
=== 2003-2007 ===
Kelso and District North By-Election 6 May 2004
Party	Candidate	Votes	%	±%
Conservative	Andrew Thomson	371	43.8	+4.0
Liberal Democrats		320	37.7	+37.7
SNP		157	18.5	+18.5
Majority		51	6.0	
Turnout		848		
Conservative gain from Independent		Swing		

Kilnknowe and Clovenfords By-Election 9 June 2005
Party	Candidate	Votes	%	±%
SNP	Bill Herd	372	33.7	+6.9
Conservative		325	29.4	+8.0
Independent		206	18.7	+18.7
Liberal Democrats		181	16.4	+16.4
Independent		20	1.8	+1.8
Majority		47	4.3	
Turnout		1,104		
SNP gain from Independent		Swing		

=== 2012-2017 ===
Leaderdale and Melrose By-Election 2 May 2013
Party	Candidate	FPv%	Count					
Party	Candidate	FPv%	1	2	3	4	5	6
Borders	Iain Gillespie	23.5	814	844	900	1,118	1,444	2,066
Conservative	Rachael Hamilton	27.6	956	975	982	1,038	1,283	
Liberal Democrats	John Paton-Day	21.5	744	756	816	983		
SNP	Harry Cummings	17.7	613	623	666			
Labour	Robin Tatler	6.8	235	238				
UKIP	Sherry Fowler	3.0	105					
Borders hold								
Valid: 3,467 Spoilt: 20 Quota: 1,734

Tweeddale West By-Election 10 October 2013
Party	Candidate	FPv%	Count						
Party	Candidate	FPv%	1	2	3	4	5	6	7
Conservative	Keith Cockburn	42.7	1,155	1,165	1,176	1,193	1,255	1,288	1,616
Liberal Democrats	Nancy Norman	25.0	677	682	690	759	858	1,034	
SNP	Morag Kerr	13.3	359	369	373	409	444		
Borders	David Pye	8.4	228	237	245	272			
Labour	Veronica McTernan	7.5	203	204	207				
UKIP	Mars Goodman	1.6	43	44					
Independent	David Cox	1.6	43						
Conservative hold									
Valid: 2,708 Spoilt: 21 Quota: 1,355 Turnout: 2,729

Hawick and Denholm By-Election 22 May 2014
Party	Candidate	FPv%	Count						
Party	Candidate	FPv%	1	2	3	4	5	6	7
Independent	Watson McAteer	25.5	732	750	803	900	1,010	1,222	1,505
Conservative	Trevor Adams	21.6	622	627	638	665	692	798	
Liberal Democrats	Ian Turnbull	15.7	450	455	485	545	637		
SNP	Harry Stoddart	14.6	419	423	461	505			
Independent	Marion Short	11.3	326	334	385				
Independent	Davie Paterson	8.7	250	269					
Independent	Craig Bryson	2.6	74						
Independent gain from Conservative									
Valid: 2,873 Spoilt: 47 Quota: 1,437 Turnout: 2,920

=== 2017-2022 ===
Selkirkshire By-Election 22 February 2018
Party	Candidate	FPv%	Count						
Party	Candidate	FPv%	1	2	3	4	5	6	7
Independent	Caroline Penman	29.7	1,040	1,049	1,080	1,125	1,231	1,522	2,028
Conservative	Trevor Adams	39.9	1,380	1,251	1,262	1,276	1,307	1,342	
SNP	John Mitchell	19.8	691	717	729	758	797		
Independent	Kenneth Gunn	6.3	219	226	238	249			
Labour	Scott Redpath	3.8	134	144	158				
Liberal Democrats	Jack Clark	2.7	95	103					
Green	Barbra Harvie	2.0	70						
Independent gain from Conservative									
Valid: 3,496 Spoilt: 44 Quota: 1,749 Turnout: 3,536

Leaderdale and Melrose By-Election 11 March 2021
Party	Candidate	FPv%	Count						
Party	Candidate	FPv%	1	2	3	4	5	6	7
Conservative	Jenny Linehan	39.9	1,380	1,389	1,399	1,406	1,451	1,653	1,969
SNP	John Paton-Day	30.2	1,042	1,051	1,069	1,120	1,156	1,297	
Liberal Democrats	Jonny Adamson	15.6	538	542	566	615	682		
Independent	Mary Douglas	4.6	159	177	194	224			
Green	Michael Needham	4.4	152	155	175				
Labour	Scott Redpath	3.3	115	120					
Independent	Karen Wilks	2.0	69						
Conservative gain from SNP									
Valid: 3,455 Spoilt: 25 Quota: 1,728 Turnout: 3,480

=== 2022-2027 ===
Jedburgh and District By-Election 22 February 2024
Party	Candidate	FPv%	Count
Party	Candidate	FPv%	1
Conservative	John Bathgate	58.5	1,377
SNP	Phil Dixon	17.4	410
Labour	Kaymarie Hughes	10.2	241
Liberal Democrats	Ray Georgeson	7.1	166
Green	Charles Strang	5.7	135
Scottish Eco-Federalists	James Clark	1.1	25
Conservative gain from SNP			
Valid: 2,354 Spoilt: 20 Quota: 1,178 Turnout: 2,374
