= Midlothian South, Tweeddale and Lauderdale =

Region or constituency of the Scottish Parliament

- County constituency for the Scottish Parliament
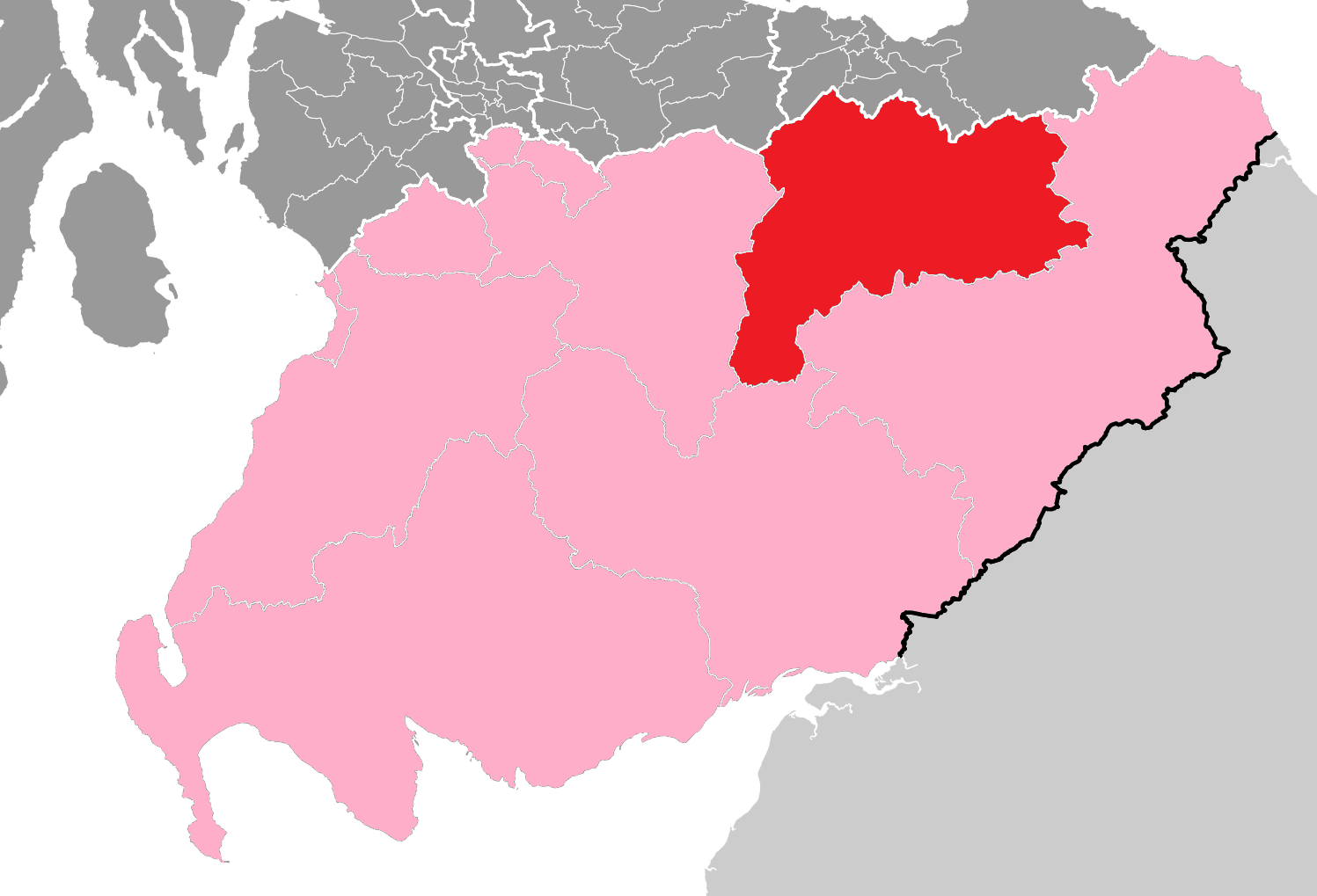

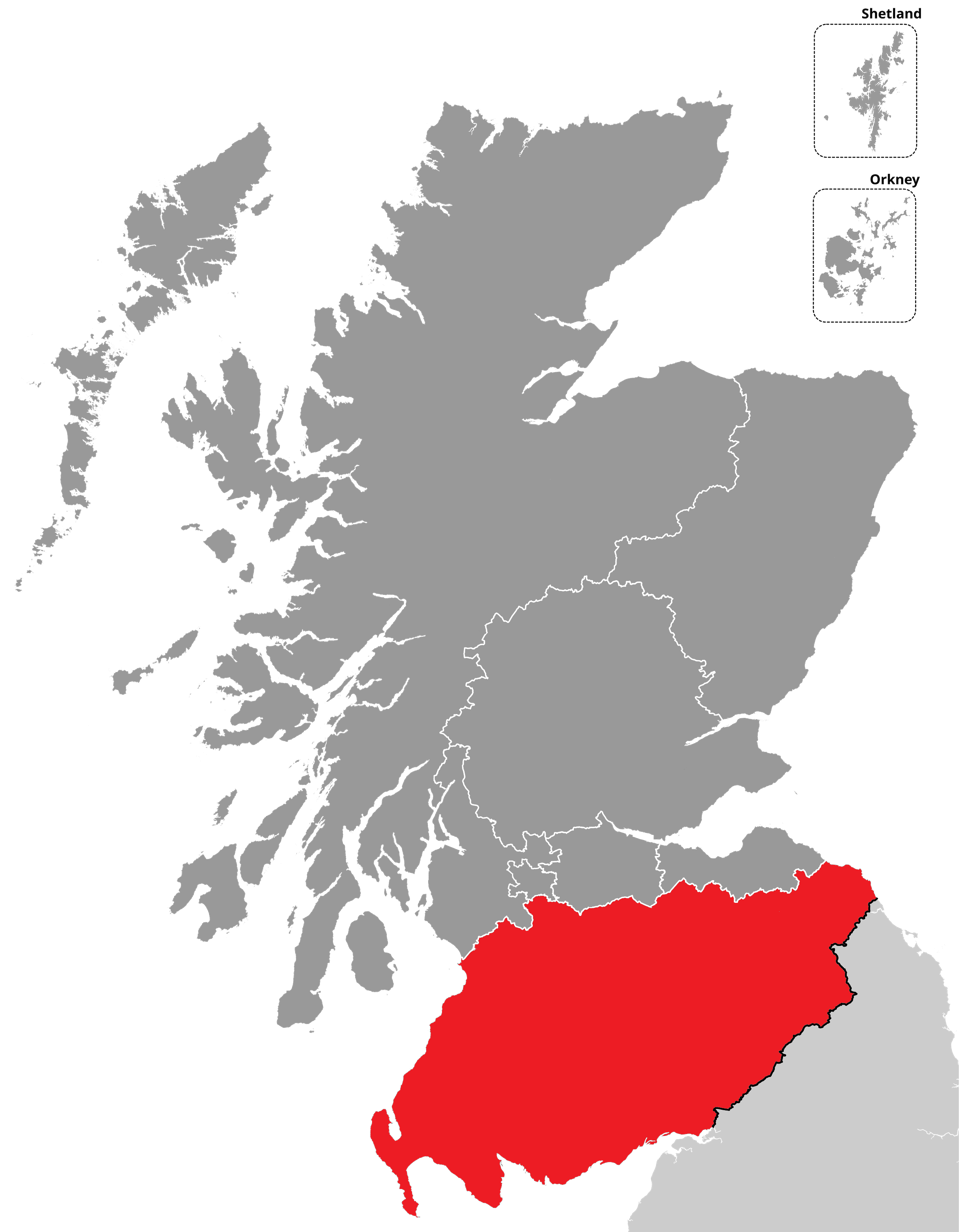
- Midlothian South, Tweeddale and Lauderdale shown within the South Scotland electoral region, and the region shown within Scotland
- Electoral region: South Scotland
- Electorate: 62,464 (2026)

Current constituency
- Created: 2011
- Party: Scottish National Party
- MSP: Calum Kerr
- Council area: Midlothian; Scottish Borders
- Created from: Midlothian, Tweeddale, Ettrick and Lauderdale

Midlothian South, Tweeddale and Lauderdale is a county constituency of the Scottish Parliament covering parts of the council areas of Midlothian and Scottish Borders. Under the additional-member electoral system used for elections to the Scottish Parliament, it elects one Member of the Scottish Parliament (MSP) by the first past the post method of election. It is also one of ten constituencies in the South Scotland electoral region, which elects seven additional members, in addition to the ten constituency MSPs, to produce a form of proportional representation for the region as a whole.

Created for the 2011 election, the constituency covers parts of the former constituencies of Midlothian and Tweeddale, Ettrick and Lauderdale. The remainder of Midlothian council area lies within the constituency of Midlothian North, whilst the remainder of Scottish Borders forms the Ettrick, Roxburgh and Berwickshire constituency.

== Electoral region ==
Following the second periodic review of Scottish Parliament boundaries in 2025, the other nine constituencies of the South Scotland region are: Ayr; Carrick, Cumnock and Doon Valley; Clydesdale; Dumfriesshire; East Kilbride; Ettrick, Roxburgh and Berwickshire; Galloway and West Dumfries; Hamilton, Larkhall and Stonehouse; and Kilmarnock and Irvine Valley. The region covers the whole of the council areas of Dumfries and Galloway, Scottish Borders, and South Ayrshire council areas; and parts of the council areas of East Ayrshire, Midlothian, and South Lanarkshire. By population it is now the largest of Scotland's eight electoral regions.

Prior to the 2025 review, there were nine constituencies in the South Scotland region. Besides Ettrick, Roxburgh and Berwickshire, the other eight constituencies were: Ayr; Carrick, Cumnock and Doon Valley; Clydesdale; Dumfriesshire; East Lothian; Ettrick, Roxburgh and Berwickshire; Galloway and West Dumfries; and Kilmarnock and Irvine Valley. The region covered the Dumfries and Galloway, East Ayrshire, Scottish Borders and South Ayrshire council areas in full and parts of the East Lothian, Midlothian and South Lanarkshire council areas.

Midlothian North, which covers the rest of Midlothian, is part of the Edinburgh and Lothians East region.

== Constituency boundaries and council area ==
Map of boundaries from 2011

Midlothian South, Tweeddale and Lauderdale was created by the First Periodic Review of Scottish Parliament Boundaries ahead of the 2011 election from parts of the former constituencies of Midlothian and Tweeddale, Ettrick and Lauderdale. Following the Second Periodic Review in 2025, the boundary with Midlothian North was amended to move Newtongrange into Midlothian North. The electoral wards of Scottish Borders Council and Midlothian Council used in the current creation of Midlothian South, Tweeddale and Lauderdale are:

- Scottish Borders:
  - Tweeddale East (entire ward)
  - Tweeddale West (entire ward)
  - Galashiels and District (entire ward)
  - Leaderdale and Melrose (entire ward)
- Midlothian:
  - Penicuik (entire ward)
  - Midlothian South (shared with Midlothian North)
  - Midlothian West (shared with Midlothian North)

== Members of the Scottish Parliament ==
Election	Member	Party
2011	Christine Grahame	Scottish National Party
2026	Calum Kerr	Scottish National Party

== Election results ==
=== 2020s ===
2026 Scottish Parliament election: Midlothian South, Tweeddale and Lauderdale (Note: Note that changes in constituency vote share are shown with respect to the notional result of the 2021 election, calculated to account for boundary changes)
Party	Candidate	Constituency			Regional		
Party	Candidate	Votes	%	±%	Votes	%	±%
SNP	Calum Kerr	14,091	40.9	▼5.1	9,350	27.0	
Conservative	Keith Cockburn	6,930	20.1	▼10.4	6,250	18.1	
Green					4,988	14.4	
Liberal Democrats	Duncan Dunlop (Note: Elected on the party list)	4,649	13.5	▲7.5	4,258	12.3	
Labour	Daniel Coleman	4,614	13.4	▲1.2	4,164	12.0	
Reform	Carolyn Grant	4,199	12.2	New	4,446	12.8	
Independent Green Voice					355	1.0	
AtLS					254	0.7	
Scottish Family					199	0.6	
Scottish Socialist					102	0.3	
Scottish Libertarian					44	0.1	
Independent	Sean Davies				44	0.1	
UKIP					40	0.1	
Independent	Denise Sommerville				40	0.1	
Heritage					37	0.1	
ADF					37	0.1	
Scottish Common Party					16	0.0	
Majority		7,161	20.8	▲5.0			
Valid votes		34,483			34,624		
Invalid votes		175			118		
Turnout		34,658	55.5	▼10.9	34,742	55.6	
SNP hold		Swing					
Notes

2021 Scottish Parliament election: Midlothian South, Tweeddale and Lauderdale
Party	Candidate	Constituency			Regional		
Party	Candidate	Votes	%	±%	Votes	%	±%
SNP	Christine Grahame (Note: Incumbent member for this constituency)	19,807	46.0	▲0.9	17,902	41.51	▲1.84
Conservative	Shona Haslam	12,981	30.2	▲1.6	12,079	28.01	▼0.65
Labour	Katherine Sangster	5,410	12.6	▼3.4	5,679	13.17	▼0.85
Liberal Democrats	AC May	2,615	6.1	▼4.3	2,832	6.57	▼1.59
Green	Dominic Ashmole	2,154	5.0	New	3,007	6.97	▲0.18
All for Unity					427	0.99	New
Alba					405	0.94	New
Independent Green Voice					202	0.47	New
Scottish Family					154	0.36	New
Reform					116	0.27	New
Abolish the Scottish Parliament					94	0.22	New
Freedom Alliance (UK)					86	0.20	New
Scottish Libertarian					56	0.13	New
UKIP					50	0.12	▼1.57
Vanguard Party (UK)	Michael Banks	67	0.2	New	21	0.05	New
Scotia Future					19	0.04	New
Majority		6,863	15.8	▼0.7			
Valid votes		43,034			43,129		
Invalid votes		137			62		
Turnout		43,171	66.4	▲7.0	43,191	66.4	▲7.0
SNP hold		Swing		▼0.4			

=== 2010s ===
2016 Scottish Parliament election: Midlothian South, Tweeddale and Lauderdale
Party	Candidate	Constituency			Regional		
Party	Candidate	Votes	%	±%	Votes	%	±%
SNP	Christine Grahame (Note: Incumbent member for this constituency)	16,031	45.1	▲1.6	14,162	39.7	▼3.5
Conservative	Michelle Ballantyne	10,163	28.6	▲16.8	10,230	28.7	▲14.7
Labour	Fiona Dugdale	5,701	16.0	▼0.7	5,005	14.0	▼2.8
Liberal Democrats	Kris Chapman	3,686	10.4	▼17.6	2,912	8.2	▼7.1
Green					2,426	6.8	▲2.1
UKIP					602	1.7	▲0.7
Clydesdale and South Scotland Independent					125	0.4	New
Solidarity					121	0.3	▼1.4
RISE					114	0.3	New
Majority		5,868	16.5	▲1.0			
Valid votes		35,581			35,697		
Invalid votes		156			54		
Turnout		35,737	59.4	▲4.1	35,751	59.4	▲4.1
SNP hold		Swing					
Notes

2011 Scottish Parliament election: Midlothian South, Tweeddale and Lauderdale
Party	Candidate	Constituency			Regional		
Party	Candidate	Votes	%	±%	Votes	%	±%
SNP	Christine Grahame (Note: Incumbent member on the party list, or for another constituency)	13,855	43.5	N/A	13,796	43.2	N/A
Liberal Democrats	Jeremy Purvis (Note: Incumbent member for the Tweeddale, Ettrick and Lauderdale constituency)	8,931	28.0	N/A	4,894	15.3	N/A
Labour	Ian Miller	5,312	16.7	N/A	5,353	16.8	N/A
Conservative	Peter Duncan	3,743	11.8	N/A	4,465	14.0	N/A
Green					1,500	4.7	N/A
Solidarity					527	1.7	N/A
All-Scotland Pensioners Party					396	1.2	N/A
UKIP					319	1.0	N/A
Scottish Christian					196	0.6	N/A
BNP					186	0.6	N/A
Socialist Labour					180	0.6	N/A
Scottish Socialist					100	0.3	N/A
Majority		4,924	15.5	N/A			
Valid votes		31,841			31,912		
Invalid votes		126			53		
Turnout		31,967	55.3	N/A	31,965	55.3	N/A
SNP win (new seat)							
