= Kelso and District (ward) =

Electoral ward in the Scottish Borders, Scotland

Location of the ward

Kelso and District is one of the eleven wards used to elect members of the Scottish Borders Council. It elects three Councillors.

== Councillors ==
Election	Councillors		
2007	Tom Weatherson (Ind./ Conservative)	Alasdair Hutton (Conservative)	Alec Nicol (Liberal Democrats)
2012	Tom Weatherson (Ind./ Conservative)	Simon Mountford (Conservative)	Alec Nicol (Liberal Democrats)
2017	Tom Weatherson (Ind./ Conservative)	Simon Mountford (Conservative)	Euan Robson (Liberal Democrats)
2022	Tom Weatherson (Ind./ Conservative)	Simon Mountford (Conservative)	Euan Robson (Liberal Democrats)

== Election results ==
=== 2022 Election ===
2022 Scottish Borders Council election

Kelso and District - 3 seats
Party	Candidate	FPv%	Count						
Party	Candidate	FPv%	1	2	3	4	5	6	7
Liberal Democrats	Euan Robson (incumbent)	29.8%	1,169						
Conservative	Tom Weatherston (incumbent)	24.0%	942	987.7					
Conservative	Simon Mountford (incumbent)	23.1%	904	926.8	932.2	932.2	937.1	973.8	1,111.3
Green	Shelagh King	13.2%	518	560.9	561.1	564.6	575.2	736.2	
Labour	Wilson George	7.7%	301	331.2	331.4	335.7	392.3		
Labour	Kenryck Lloyd-Jones	1.8%	69	81.7	81.8	82.3			
Vanguard Party championing Kelso	Sunny Smith	0.4%	17	19.3	19.3				
Electorate: 8,499 Valid: 3,920 Spoilt: 70 Quota: 981 Turnout: 46.9%

=== 2017 Election ===
2017 Scottish Borders Council election

Kelso and District - 3 seats
Party	Candidate	FPv%	Count							
Party	Candidate	FPv%	1	2	3	4	5	6	7	8
Conservative	Tom Weatherston (incumbent)	28%	1,212							
Conservative	Simon Mountford (incumbent)	25%	1,083							
Liberal Democrats	Euan Robson	14.7%	636	675	675	700	741	788	955	1,370
SNP	Alison Lamond	16.5%	713	715	715	731	749	809	850	
Independent	Ian Aitchison	7.7%	333	362	362	389	401	424		
Green	Colin Shaughnessy	3%	129	133	133	144	164			
Labour	Sally Prentice	2.7%	116	119	119	124				
Independent	Colin McGrath	2.4%	104	114	114					
Electorate: TBC Valid: 4,326 Spoilt: 89 Quota: 1,082 Turnout: 53.1%

=== 2012 Election ===
2012 Scottish Borders Council election

Kelso and District - 3 seats
Party	Candidate	FPv%	Count							
Party	Candidate	FPv%	1	2	3	4	5	6	7	8
Conservative	Tom Weatherston (incumbent)	23.98	777	777	794	824				
Liberal Democrats	Alec Nicol (incumbent)	22.5	729	756	791	832				
Conservative	Simon Mountford	14.29	463	471	482	518	522.6	529.2	610.1	703.7
SNP	Maggie Stanfield	12.75	413	444	462	507	510.5	511.6	590.1	
Independent	Yvonne Huggins-Haig	10.0	324	331	365	435	438.7	440.2		
Borders	Diana Miers	7.81	253	269	306					
Independent	Colin McGrath	5.09	165	176						
Green	Michael Scott	3.58	116							
Electorate: 8,242 Valid: 3,240 Spoilt: 24 Quota: 811 Turnout: 3,264 (39.31%)

=== 2007 Election ===
2007 Scottish Borders Council election

Scottish Borders council election, 2007: Kelso and District
Party	Candidate	FPv%	%	Seat	Count
Liberal Democrats	Alec Nicol	1,116	25.7	1	1
Conservative	Alasdair Hutton	982	22.7	2	5
Independent	Tom Weatherston†	814	18.8	3	5
Independent	Trevor Black	431	9.9		
Conservative	Andrew Thomson	427	9.9		
SNP	Paul Cartledge	346	8.0		
Green	Michael Scott	218	5.0		
