= Jedburgh and District (ward) =

Electoral ward of the Scottish Borders

Location of the ward

Jedburgh and District is one of the eleven wards used to elect members of the Scottish Borders Council. It elects three Councillors. In 2020 the ward had a population of 9,186. The main settlements (population of 500 or more) are Jedburgh and St. Boswells.

== Councillors ==
Election	Councillors		
2007	Jim Brown (SNP)	Sandy Scott (Conservative)	Len Wyse (Conservative)
2012	Jim Brown (SNP)	Sandy Scott (Conservative)	Rory Stewart (Ind.)
2017	Jim Brown (SNP)	Sandy Scott (Conservative)	Scott Hamilton (Conservative)
2022	Pam Brown (SNP)	Sandy Scott (Conservative)	Scott Hamilton (Conservative)

== Election results ==
=== 2022 Election ===
2022 Scottish Borders Council election

Jedburgh and District - 3 seats
Party	Candidate	FPv%	Count						
Party	Candidate	FPv%	1	2	3	4	5	6	7
Conservative	Scott Hamilton (incumbent)	31.1%	1,089						
SNP	Pam Brown	23.1%	809	814.3	829.5	840.5	930.5		
Conservative	Sandy Scott (incumbent)	19.2%	675	823.5	827.9	840.4	858.4	860.8	1,077
Independent	John Bathgate	15.1%	529	558	564.8	615	706.3	727	
Green	Charles Strang	7.1%	250	254.5	261.5	273.9			
Independent	Jesse Rae	2.9%	102	106.5	110.7				
Alba	Yvonne Ridley Yvonne Ridley	1.5%	53	55.5					
Electorate: 7,212 Valid: 3,507 Spoilt: 53 Quota: 877 Turnout: 49.4%

=== 2017 Election ===
2017 Scottish Borders Council election

Jedburgh and District - 3 seats
Party	Candidate	FPv%	Count						
Party	Candidate	FPv%	1	2	3	4	5	6	7
Conservative	Sandy Scott (incumbent)	28.5%	1,094						
Conservative	Scott Hamilton	26.8%	1,026						
SNP	Jim Brown (incumbent)	19.7%	755	759	760	768	795	877	1,150
Independent	Rory Stewart (incumbent)	15.6%	600	633	657	708	747	801	
Green	Charles Strang	4.5%	171	179	183	185	218		
Labour	Kenryck Lloyd-Jones	3.1%	119	128	133	135			
Independent	Harvey Oliver	1.8%	70	82	90				
Electorate: TBC Valid: 3,835 Spoilt: 56 Quota: 959 Turnout: 54.4%

=== 2012 Election ===
2012 Scottish Borders Council election

Jedburgh and District - 3 seats
Party	Candidate	FPv%	Count						
Party	Candidate	FPv%	1	2	3	4	5	6	7
SNP	Jim Brown (incumbent)	23.44	759	793	837				
Conservative	Sandy Scott (incumbent)	21.68	702	704	769	771.1	948.5		
Independent	Rory Stewart	16.95	549	580	642	650.2	781.1	801.9	1,050.6
Conservative	Len Wyse (incumbent)	12.75	413	417	430	432.5			
Liberal Democrats	John Bathgate	11.98	388	409	459	464.7	539	567.4	
Borders	Trevor Jackson	7.97	258	292					
Labour	David Robert Scott Sharp	5.22	169						
Electorate: 8,242 Valid: 3,238 Spoilt: 45 Quota: 810 Turnout: 3,283 (45.24%)

=== 2007 Election ===
2007 Scottish Borders Council election

Scottish Borders council election, 2007: Jedburgh and District
Party	Candidate	FPv%	%	Seat	Count
Conservative	Sandy Scott	1,011	26.0	1	1
Conservative	Len Wyse	878	22.6	2	4
SNP	Jim Brown	877	22.6	3	4
Liberal Democrats	Alistair O'Neil	716	18.4		
Borders Party	Jim Smith	316	8.1		
Independent	Jim Millhouse	87	2.2		
