= Hawick and Denholm (ward) =

Electoral ward in the Scottish Borders, Scotland

Location of the ward

Hawick and Denholm is one of the eleven wards used to elect members of the Scottish Borders Council. It elects three Councillors.

== Councillors ==
Election	Councillors		
2007	Stewart Marshall (Ind.)	Zandra Elliot (Conservative)	Jock Houston (Liberal Democrats)
2012	Stewart Marshall (Ind.)	Zandra Elliot (Conservative)	Alastair Cranston (SNP)
2017	Stewart Marshall (Ind.)	Neil Richards (Conservative)	Clair Ramage (SNP/ Ind.)
2022	Stewart Marshall (Ind.)	Neil Richards (Conservative)	Clair Ramage (SNP/ Ind.)

== Election results ==
=== 2022 Election ===
2022 Scottish Borders Council election

Hawick and Denholm - 3 seats
Party	Candidate	FPv%	Count					
Party	Candidate	FPv%	1	2	3	4	5	6
Independent	Stuart Marshall (incumbent)	69.2%	2,265					
Independent	Clair Ramage (incumbent)*	9.7	316	899.9				
Conservative	Neil Richards (incumbent)	9.4	309	441.2	451.3	465.9	541.4	680.2
Green	Catriona Hamilton	4.5	147	224.3	242.4	312.5	375.8	
Labour	Kay Hughes	3.7	120	188.9	197.9			
Independent	Trevor Adams	3.5	114	232.8	253.3	291.8		
Electorate: 7,173 Valid: 3,271 Spoilt: 30 Quota: 818 Turnout: 46.0%

=== 2017 Election ===
2017 Scottish Borders Council election

Hawick and Denholm - 3 seats
Party	Candidate	FPv%	Count					
Party	Candidate	FPv%	1	2	3	4	5	6
Independent	Stuart Marshall (incumbent)	63.3%	2,283					
Conservative	Neil Richards	16.5%	596	952				
SNP	Clair Ramage	13.3%	478	696	697	738	764	905
Liberal Democrats	Ian Turnbull	3.9%	140	393	410	432	471	
Labour	David Byrne	1.6%	57	98	101	114		
Green	Kevin Ferguson	1.4%	51	93	95			
Electorate: 7,128 Valid: 3,605 Spoilt: 26 Quota: 902 Turnout: 50.9%

=== 2012 Election ===
2012 Scottish Borders Council election

Hawick and Denholm - 3 seats
Party	Candidate	FPv%	Count					
Party	Candidate	FPv%	1	2	3	4	5	6
Independent	Stuart Marshall (incumbent)	56.72	1,734					
Conservative	Zandra Elliott (incumbent)†††	13.97	427	580.1	589.3	618.2	633.2	802.3
SNP	Alastair Cranston	12.46	381	506.2	523.9	539.3	593.1	749.9
Liberal Democrats	Watson McAteer	8.60	263	482.6	493.8	507.2	542.3	
Labour	Michael A Grieve	4.81	147	191.1	205.9	215.2		
Borders	Mary Douglas	2.45	75	96.8	105.8			
Independent	Craig Bryson	0.98	30	88.1				
Electorate: 7,183 Valid: 3,057 Spoilt: 34 Quota: 765 Turnout: 3,091 (42.56%)

=== 2007 Election ===
2007 Scottish Borders Council election

Scottish Borders council election, 2007: Hawick and Denholm
Party	Candidate	FPv%	%	Seat	Count
Conservative	Zandra Elliott	980	26.0	1	1
Independent	Stewart Marshall	904	24.0	2	5
Liberal Democrats	Jock Houston	738	19.6	3	5
SNP	Derek Philips	454	12.0		
Independent	Andrew Farquhar	301	8.0		
Liberal Democrats	Alex Martin	232	6.2		
Green	Kevin Ferguson	112	3.0		
Borders Party	Charles Humphries	50	1.3		
