= Galashiels and District (ward) =

Ward of the Scottish Borders

Location of the ward

Galashiels and District is one of the eleven wards used to elect members of the Scottish Borders Council. It elects four Councillors.

== Councillors ==
Election	Councillors			
2007	Sandy Aitchison (Borders Party /Ind.)	John Mitchell (SNP)	Fiona Lackenby (Conservative)	Jim Hume (Liberal Democrats)
2012	Sandy Aitchison (Borders Party /Ind.)	John Mitchell (SNP)	Bill Herd (SNP)	Bill White (Ind.)
2017	Sandy Aitchison (Borders Party /Ind.)	Andy Anderson (SNP)	Euan Jardine (Conservative)	Harry Scott (Ind.)
2022	Neil MacKinnon (Green)	Fay Sinclair (SNP)	Euan Jardine (Conservative)	Hannah Steel (Liberal Democrats)

== Election results ==
=== 2022 Election ===
2022 Scottish Borders Council election

Galashiels and District - 4 seats
Party	Candidate	FPv%	Count							
Party	Candidate	FPv%	1	2	3	4	5	6	7	8
SNP	Fay Sinclair	35.9%	1,637							
Conservative	Euan Jardine (incumbent)	26.4%	1,205							
Liberal Democrats	Hannah Steel	10.6%	483	581.8	658.6	662.8	667.1	697.1	777.4	995.6
Green	Neil MacKinnon	9.0%	412	786.2	796.7	809.9	814.8	855.9	889.8	984.4
Independent	Bill White	6.9%	315	364.6	415.9	416.2	426.6	509	706.3	
Independent	Harry Redpath Scott (incumbent)	5.4%	246	272.6	314.6	318.8	321.3	398.6		
Independent	Duck Frater	4.4%	199	230	252.6	257.5	272.5			
Vanguard Party championing Galashiels	Michael Banks	0.8%	36	43.5	47.9	49.8				
Scottish Eco-Federalist Party (SEFP)	James D W Clark	0.5%	24	30.2	32.9					
Electorate: 11,639 Valid: 4,557 Spoilt: 43 Quota: 912 Turnout: 4,600 (39.5%)

=== 2017 Election ===
2017 Scottish Borders Council election

Galashiels and District - 4 seats
Party	Candidate	FPv%	Count						
Party	Candidate	FPv%	1	2	3	4	5	6	7
Conservative	Euan Jardine	28.5%	1,292						
SNP	Andy Anderson	20%	907						
Independent	Sandy Aitchison (incumbent)	11.9%	539	612.9	640.3	732.4	916.2		
Independent	Harry Scott	10.1%	460	517.8	532.4	592.4	753.1	757	988.3
SNP	John Mitchell (incumbent)	11.5%	523	530.4	558.9	597.7	647.3		
Independent	Bill White (incumbent)	8.7%	396	441.3	462.1	522			
Liberal Democrats	Caledonia Bhatia	5.5%	249	316	369.2				
Labour	David Sharp	3.7%	167	188.5					
Electorate: 10,980 (Est.) Valid: 4,533 Spoilt: 66 Quota: 907 Turnout: 4,599 (41.9%)

=== 2012 Election ===
2012 Scottish Borders Council election

Galashiels and District - 4 seats
Party	Candidate	FPv%	Count					
Party	Candidate	FPv%	1	2	3	4	5	6
Borders	Sandy Aitchison (incumbent)	22.45	822					
SNP	Bill Herd *	20.95	766					
Independent	Bill White	13.69	501	522.9	524.6	590.6	701	894.8
SNP	John Mitchell (incumbent)	13.45	492	506	532.5	593.5	639.9	762
Liberal Democrats	Rick Kenney	11.40	417	432.9	434.8	490.3	609.4	
Conservative	Fiona Lackenby (incumbent)	10.56	386	402.5	403.2	409.6		
Labour	Robbie Tatler	7.47	273	280.8	281.7			
Electorate: 10,813 Valid: 3,657 Spoilt: 69 Quota: 732 Turnout: 3,726 (33.82%)

=== 2007 Election ===
2007 Scottish Borders Council election

Scottish Borders council election, 2007: Galashiels and District
Party	Candidate	FPv%	%	Seat	Count
SNP	John Mitchell	1,519	28.2	1	1
Liberal Democrats	Jim Hume	1,466	27.2	2	1
Conservative	Fiona Lackenby	735	13.6	4	6
Borders Party	Sandy Aitchison	693	12.9	3	6
Independent	Bill White	453	8.4		
Solidarity	Graeme McIver	210	3.9		
Independent	David Smail	173	3.2		
Independent	Alistair Lings	136	2.5		
