= Tweeddale East (ward) =

Electoral ward in the Scottish Borders, Scotland

Location of the ward

Tweeddale East is one of the eleven wards used to elect members of the Scottish Borders Council. It elects three Councillors.

== Councillors ==
Election	Councillors		
2007	Bill Herd (SNP)	Gavin Logan (Conservative)	Graham Garvie (Liberal Democrats)
2012	Stuart Bell (SNP)	Gavin Logan (Conservative)	Graham Garvie (Liberal Democrats)
2017	Stuart Bell (SNP)	Shona Haslam (Conservative)	Robin Tatler (Ind.)
2022	Marshall Neil Douglas (SNP)	Julie Pirone (Conservative)	Robin Tatler (Ind.)

== Election results ==
=== 2022 Election ===
2022 Scottish Borders Council election

Tweeddale East
Party	Candidate	FPv%	Count				
Party	Candidate	FPv%	1	2	3	4	5
SNP	Marshall Neil Douglas	30.3%	1,485				
Independent	Robin Tatler (incumbent)	18.3%	896	929.4	933.6	1,031.7	1,293.7
Conservative	Julie Pirone	22.5%	1,102	1,106.7	1,107.7	1,148.6	1,253.3
Green	Ellie Clarke	9.6%	469	604.7	607	718.3	855.6
Liberal Democrats	David Pye	9.9%	483	506.2	507.2	649.1	
Labour	Robert Bon	9.2%	449	481.2	482.2		
Vanguard Party championing Tweeddale	Calum MacEwan Watt	0.2%	11	11.9			
Electorate: 9,117 Valid: 4,895 Spoilt: 24 Quota: 1,224 Turnout: 4,919 (54.0%)

=== 2017 Election ===
2017 Scottish Borders Council election

Tweeddale East
Party	Candidate	FPv%	Count				
Party	Candidate	FPv%	1	2	3	4	5
Conservative	Shona Haslam	37.6%	1,804				
SNP	Stuart Bell (incumbent)	20%	960	971.7	1,442.7		
Independent	Robin Tatler	16.5%	793	970.4	1,013.7	1,093.4	1,701.3
Liberal Democrats	Amanda Kubie	13.6%	650	881.7	931.1	1,003.5	
SNP	Simon Ritchie	12.2%	585	590.7			
Electorate: 8,640 (Est.) Valid: 4,792 Spoilt: 46 Quota: 1,199 Turnout: 4,838 (56%)

=== 2012 Election ===
2012 Scottish Borders Council election

Tweeddale East
Party	Candidate	FPv%	Count					
Party	Candidate	FPv%	1	2	3	4	5	6
SNP	Stuart Bell	26.41	990					
Conservative	Gavin Logan (incumbent)	24.78	929	934.4	971.8			
Liberal Democrats	Graham Garvie (incumbent)	16.38	614	622.3	674.5	686.7	811.9	1,087.9
Labour	Robin Tatler	15.23	571	579.6	629.9	631.2	731.2	
Borders	Frances Pringle	9.20	345	352.9	439	448.7		
Independent	David Cox	8.00	300	307.1				
Electorate: 8,106 Valid: 3,749 Spoilt: 32 Quota: 938 Turnout: 3,781 (46.25%)

=== 2007 Election ===
2007 Scottish Borders Council election

Scottish Borders council election, 2007: Tweeddale East
Party	Candidate	FPv%	%	Seat	Count
SNP	Bill Herd	1,167	24.3	1	3
Liberal Democrats	Graham Garvie	1,159	24.1	2	3
Conservative	Gavin Logan	1,086	22.6	3	4
Labour	Robin Tatler	563	11.7		
Liberal Democrats	Bran McCrow	490	10.2		
Borders Party	Tom Douglas	231	4.8		
Scottish Socialist	Norman Lockhart	105	2.2		
