= Dumfriesshire, Clydesdale and Tweeddale =

UK Parliament constituency (since 2005)

Coordinates: 55.2°N 3.5°W

- County constituency for the House of Commons
- Interactive map of boundaries from 2024
- Location within Scotland
- Subdivision: Dumfries and Galloway, Scottish Borders and South Lanarkshire
- Electorate: 70,738 (March 2020)
- Major settlements: Annan, Gretna, Gretna Green, Kirkconnel, Lockerbie, Sanquhar

Current constituency
- Created: 2005
- Member of Parliament: David Mundell (Conservative)
- Created from: Dumfries, Clydesdale and Tweeddale, Ettrick and Lauderdale

Dumfriesshire, Clydesdale and Tweeddale (/dʊmˈfriːs.ʃiːr ... ˈklaɪdz.deɪl ... ˈtwiːd.deɪl/) is a constituency of the UK House of Commons, located in the South of Scotland, within the Dumfries and Galloway, South Lanarkshire and Scottish Borders council areas. It elects one Member of Parliament (MP) at least once every five years using the First-past-the-post system of voting. It is currently represented in Westminster by the former Secretary of State for Scotland, David Mundell, who has been the MP since 2005; from 2005 to 2017, he was the only Conservative MP in Scotland.

The seat has a diverse electoral history, with the Dumfriesshire area being a longtime Conservative seat, the Clydesdale area being formerly safe Labour territory, and Tweeddale had been part of Liberal Democrat-voting constituencies since the 1980s.

== Boundaries ==
The Dumfriesshire, Clydesdale and Tweeddale constituency was created by the Fifth Review of UK Parliament constituencies of the Boundary Commission for Scotland, and covers parts of the Dumfries and Galloway, South Lanarkshire and Scottish Borders council areas.

2005–2024: Under the Fifth Review, the boundaries were defined in accordance with the ward structure in place on 30 November 2004. Further to reviews of local government ward boundaries which came into effect in 2007 and 2017, but did not affect the parliamentary boundaries, the constituency comprised the following wards or part wards:

- The Dumfries and Galloway Council wards of Annandale East and Eskdale, Annandale North, Annandale South, Mid and Upper Nithsdale (most), Lochar (small part), and Nith (small part);
- The Scottish Borders Council wards of Tweeddale East and Tweeddale West (most); and
- The South Lanarkshire Council wards of Clydesdale East (majority) and Clydesdale South (minority).

2024–present: Further to the 2023 review of Westminster constituencies which came into effect for the 2024 general election, the constituency was subject to minor boundary changes, losing the part of the Nith ward, offset by the gain of a further part of the Lochar ward. The remainder of the Clydesdale East ward was also added.

== Constituency profile ==
One of the largest seats in terms of area, the constituency is predominantly rural and is very sparsely populated. It stretches from 10 miles outside of Edinburgh in the northeast all the way down to Gretna at the border with England. It is also the only seat in Scotland that has been held by the Conservatives in every election since its creation. It contains some very affluent areas as well as some more working-class areas; however, it is a large rural seat where farming is a big source of employment. The M74, which is the main road between Scotland and England, runs through the constituency as do the West Coast Mainline and Glasgow South Western railway lines. Its largest towns are Annan, Biggar, Gretna/Gretna Green, Langholm, Lockerbie, Moffat and Peebles. The seat also contains the Southern Upland Way, a popular walk for tourists in the south of Scotland.

== Political history ==
The seat's main predecessor seats, Dumfriesshire, Clydesdale and Tweeddale, Ettrick & Lauderdale, all had distinct political influences. Dumfriesshire had been a Conservative/National Liberal seat from 1931 to 1997, but was lost to Labour's Russell Brown at the 1997 general election, in which the Conservatives lost all their Scottish seats.

Clydesdale had been a safe Labour seat since the 1980s, and Tweeddale, Ettrick and Lauderdale had been a Liberal/Liberal Democrat seat since 1983.

Following the boundary review for the 2005 general election, Labour held a clear majority of 12% over the Conservatives, according to calculations of notional results (an estimate of how the seat would have voted if it had existed at the previous election) and the seat was 96th on the Conservatives' target list. The Liberal Democrats finished in a close third place at the election. However, former Conservative MSP David Mundell was successful in gaining the seat from Labour, with a swing of 8.0%. This left him as the sole Conservative MP representing a Scottish constituency at the 2005 general election, after the Conservative MP for Galloway and Upper Nithsdale, Peter Duncan was defeated when standing at the new Dumfries and Galloway constituency, and Conservative attempts to gain Angus from the SNP ended in failure.

In 2010, Mundell was re-elected, with an increased majority. In 2015, after the SNP landslide victory in Scotland, he narrowly defeated the SNP candidate, Emma Harper by 798 votes, and was the only Scottish Conservative MP elected. However, following the SNP's losses at the 2017 snap general election, the Conservatives gained 12 seats in Scotland, with Mundell increasing his majority to 9,441 votes. Mundell was re-elected at the 2019 general election, but with a reduced majority of 3,781 votes, in an election where the SNP made gains across Scotland at the expense of Labour and the Conservatives. Although his vote share fell considerably, Mundell was re-elected at the 2024 election with a slightly increased majority of 4,242 votes, as the SNP vote fell even further, with Labour coming in a close third.

== Members of Parliament ==
Election	Member	Party
2005	David Mundell	Conservative

== Election results ==
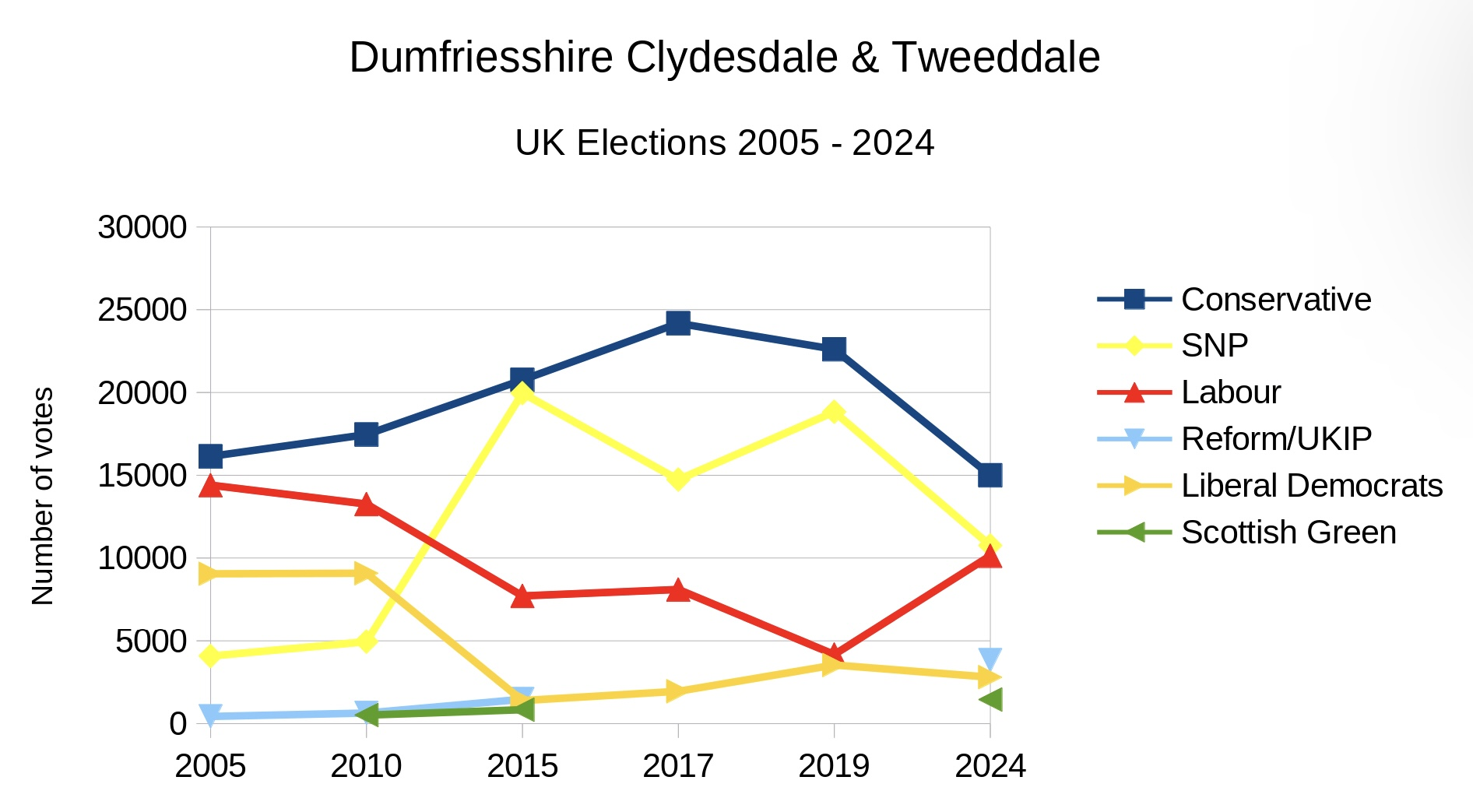
Dumfriesshire Clydesdale and Tweeddale election results

=== Elections in the 2020s ===
2024 general election: Dumfriesshire, Clydesdale and Tweeddale
Party	Candidate	Votes	%	±%
Conservative	David Mundell	14,999	33.9	−12.5
SNP	Kim Marshall	10,757	24.3	−13.6
Labour	Daniel Coleman	10,140	22.9	+14.6
Reform	David Kirkwood	3,822	8.6	N/A
Liberal Democrats	Drummond Begg	2,800	6.3	−1.0
Green	Dominic Ashmole	1,488	3.4	N/A
Scottish Family	Gareth Kirk	208	0.5	N/A
Majority		4,242	9.6	+1.9
Turnout		44,214	61.5	−10.5
Conservative hold		Swing	+0.5	

=== Elections in the 2010s ===
2019 notional result (Note: Estimate of the 2019 general election result as if the revised boundaries recommended under the 2023 boundary review were in place)
Party	Vote	%
Conservative	23,649	46.5
SNP	19,311	37.9
Labour	4,223	8.3
Liberal Democrats	3,713	7.3
Majority	4,338	8.5
Turnout	50,896	72.0
Electorate	70,738	

2019 general election: Dumfriesshire, Clydesdale and Tweeddale
Party	Candidate	Votes	%	±%
Conservative	David Mundell	22,611	46.0	−3.4
SNP	Amanda Burgauer	18,830	38.3	+8.2
Labour	Nick Chisholm	4,172	8.5	−8.0
Liberal Democrats	John Ferry	3,540	7.2	+3.2
Majority		3,781	7.7	−11.6
Turnout		49,153	71.9	−0.5
Conservative hold		Swing	−5.8	

2017 general election: Dumfriesshire, Clydesdale and Tweeddale
Party	Candidate	Votes	%	±%
Conservative	David Mundell	24,177	49.4	+9.6
SNP	Màiri McAllan	14,736	30.1	−8.2
Labour	Douglas Beattie	8,102	16.5	+1.7
Liberal Democrats	John Ferry	1,949	4.0	+1.3
Majority		9,441	19.3	+17.8
Turnout		48,964	72.4	−3.7
Conservative hold		Swing	+8.9	

2015 general election: Dumfriesshire, Clydesdale and Tweeddale
Party	Candidate	Votes	%	±%
Conservative	David Mundell	20,759	39.8	+1.8
SNP	Emma Harper	19,961	38.3	+27.5
Labour	Archie Dryburgh	7,711	14.8	−14.1
UKIP	Kevin Newton	1,472	2.8	+1.4
Liberal Democrats	Amanda Kubie	1,392	2.7	−17.1
Green	Jody Jamieson	839	1.6	+0.5
Majority		798	1.5	−7.6
Turnout		52,134	76.1	+7.2
Conservative hold		Swing	−12.9	

2010 general election: Dumfriesshire, Clydesdale and Tweeddale
Party	Candidate	Votes	%	±%
Conservative	David Mundell	17,457	38.0	+1.8
Labour	Claudia Beamish	13,263	28.9	−3.4
Liberal Democrats	Catriona Bhatia	9,080	19.8	−0.5
SNP	Aileen Orr	4,945	10.8	+1.7
UKIP	Douglas Watters	637	1.4	+0.4
Green	Alis Ballance	510	1.1	N/A
Majority		4,194	9.1	+5.2
Turnout		45,892	68.9	+1.3
Conservative hold		Swing	+2.6	

=== Elections in the 2000s ===
2005 general election: Dumfriesshire, Clydesdale and Tweeddale
Party	Candidate	Votes	%	±%
Conservative	David Mundell	16,141	36.2	+11.4
Labour	Sean Marshall	14,403	32.3	−4.6
Liberal Democrats	Patsy Kenton	9,046	20.3	−1.5
SNP	Andrew Wood	4,075	9.1	−5.2
Scottish Socialist	Sarah MacTavish	521	1.2	−0.6
UKIP	Tony Lee	430	1.0	+0.9
Majority		1,738	3.9	
Turnout		44,616	67.6	
Conservative win (new seat)				
