= Selkirkshire (ward) =

Electoral ward in the Scottish Borders, Scotland

Location of the ward

Selkirkshire is one of the eleven wards used to elect members of the Scottish Borders Council. It elects three Councillors.

== Councillors ==
Election	Councillors		
2007	Kenneth Gunn (SNP)	Carolyn Riddelll-Carre (Conservative)	Vicky Davidson (Liberal Democrats)
2012	Gordon Edgar (Ind.)	Michelle Ballantyne (Conservative)	Vicky Davidson (Liberal Democrats)
2017	Gordon Edgar (Ind.)	Michelle Ballantyne (Conservative)	Elaine Thornton-Nicol (SNP)
2018 by	Gordon Edgar (Ind.)	Caroline Penman (Ind.)	Elaine Thornton-Nicol (SNP)
2022	Caroline Cochrane (Ind.)	Leagh Douglas (Conservative)	Elaine Thornton-Nicol (SNP)

== Election results ==
=== 2022 Election ===
2022 Scottish Borders Council election

Selkirkshire - 3 seats
Party	Candidate	FPv%	Count								
Party	Candidate	FPv%	1	2	3	4	5	6	7	8	9
Independent	Caroline Cochrane	35.5	1,423								
Conservative	Leagh Douglas	26.2	1,049								
SNP	Elaine Thornton-Nicol (incumbent)	21.8	873	943.7	945.1	1,073.2					
Labour	Scott Redpath	5.6	223	280.7	286.7	336.6					
Green	Barbra Harvie	5.5	222	266.1	268.2						
Independent	Gordon Edgar (incumbent)	5.4	217	310.2	327.3	371.7					
Electorate: 8,018 Valid: 4,007 Spoilt: 34 Quota: 1,002 Turnout: 50.4%

=== 2018 by-election ===
Selkirkshire By-election (22 February 2018)
Party	Candidate	FPv%	Count						
Party	Candidate	FPv%	1	2	3	4	5	6	7
Conservative	Trevor Adams	35.7	1,247	1,251	1,262	1,276	1,307	1,342	
Independent	Caroline Penman	29.7	1,040	1,049	1,080	1,125	1,231	1,522	2,028
SNP	John Mitchell	19.8	691	717	729	758	797		
Independent	Kenneth Gunn	6.3	219	226	238	249			
Labour	Scott Redpath	3.8	134	144	158				
Liberal Democrats	Jack Clark	2.7	95	103					
Green	Barbra Harvie	2.0	70						
Valid: 3,496 Spoilt: 44 Quota: 1,749 Turnout: 3,536 (45.1%)

=== 2017 Election ===
2017 Scottish Borders Council election

Selkirkshire - 3 seats
Party	Candidate	FPv%	Count								
Party	Candidate	FPv%	1	2	3	4	5	6	7	8	9
Conservative	Michelle Ballantyne (incumbent)	27%	1,081								
SNP	Elaine Thornton-Nicol	22.2%	888	889	941	956	983	1,031			
Independent	Gordon Edgar (incumbent)	12.8%	514	524	531	569	607	646	652	847	1,083
Conservative	Trevor Adams	15.1%	606	661	663	675	694	713	713	763	
Independent	Kenneth Gunn	9.8%	392	396	403	417	429	456	464		
Labour	Scott Redpath	3.7%	147	148	165	176	219				
Liberal Democrats	Nancy Norman	3.3%	134	136	163	171					
Independent	David Black	3.1%	123	124	125						
Green	Barbra Harvie	3%	122	123							
Electorate: 7,752 (Est.) Valid: 4,007 Spoilt: 86 Quota: 1,002 Turnout: 4,093 (52.8%)

=== 2012 Election ===
2012 Scottish Borders Council election

Selkirkshire - 3 seats
Party	Candidate	FPv%	Count				
Party	Candidate	FPv%	1	2	3	4	5
Conservative	Michelle Ballantyne	24.28	799	832			
SNP	Kenneth Gunn (incumbent)	20.39	671	696	696.8	744.9	
Liberal Democrats	Vicky Davidson (incumbent)	19.72	649	708	710.8	821.4	1,042.6
Independent	Gordon Edgar	18.14	597	673	674.1	762.4	983.5
Borders	Leven Brown	9.09	299	340	341.7		
Independent	Gordon Harrison	8.39	276				
Electorate: 7,714 Valid: 3,291 Spoilt: 36 Quota: 823 Turnout: 3,327 (42.66%)

=== 2007 Election ===
2007 Scottish Borders Council election

Scottish Borders council election, 2007: Selkirkshire
Party	Candidate	FPv%	%	Seat	Count
Liberal Democrats	Vicky Davidson	1,313	29.5	1	1
Conservative	Carolyn Riddell-Carre	1,121	25.2	2	1
SNP	Kenneth Gunn	826	18.5	3	5
Independent	Gordon Edgar	558	12.5		
Borders Party	Violet Baillie	360	8.1		
Independent	Alistair Pattullo	279	6.3		
