= 2003 Scottish Borders Council election =

2003 Scottish local government election

← 1999	3 May 2003	2007 →

All 34 seats to Scottish Borders Council 18 seats needed for a majority
	First party	Second party	Third party
Party	Independent	Conservative	Liberal Democrats
Last election	14 seats, 32.14%	1 seats, 16.9%	14 seats, 27.5%
Seats before	14	1	14
Seats won	14	10	9
Seat change	0	▲9	▼5
Popular vote	12,216	11,490	10,561
Percentage	30.4%	28.6%	26.3%
Swing	▼1.2%	▲11.7%	▼1.8%
	Fourth party
Party	SNP
Last election	4 seats, 18.1%
Seats before	4
Seats won	1
Seat change	▼3
Popular vote	4,625
Percentage	11.5%
Swing	▼6.6%
Council Leader before election
John Ross Scott
Liberal Democrats
Council Leader after election
David Parker
Independent

Elections for the Scottish Borders Council took place on Thursday 1 May 2003, alongside the wider Scottish local elections.

No party held a majority, with the largest grouping - local Independents - winning 14 of the council's 34 seats.

== Aggregate results ==
Scottish Borders Council election, 2003
Party	Seats	Gains	Losses	Net gain/loss	Seats %	Votes %	Votes	+/−
Independent	14			0	41.2	30.4	12,216	▼1.2
Conservative	10			▲9	29.4	28.6	11,490	▲11.7
Liberal Democrats	9			▼5	26.5	26.3	10,561	▼1.8
SNP	1			▼3	2.9	11.5	4,625	▼6.6
Scottish Socialist	0			0	0.0	1.9	768	New
Labour	0			▼1	0.0	1.4	559	▼4.0

== Ward results ==
Ward 1: Eyemouth and District South
Party	Candidate	Votes	%
Independent	Michael Cook	779	82.4
Conservative	Michael Norcott	166	17.6
Majority		613	64.8
Turnout		945	41.8
Independent gain from Independent			

Ward 2: Chirnside and District
Party	Candidate	Votes	%
Conservative	James Fullarton	614	57.9
SNP	Ms Aileen Orr	446	42.1
Majority		168	15.8
Turnout		1,060	43.8
Conservative hold			

Ward 3: Coldstream and District
Party	Candidate	Votes	%
Independent	John Law	603	41.8
SNP	Donald Moffat	556	38.5
Conservative	Robert Kennedy	285	19.7
Majority		47	3.3
Turnout		1,444	57.5
Independent hold			

Ward 4: Duns and District South
Party	Candidate	Votes	%
Conservative	Margaret McCrave	450	40.0
Liberal Democrats	Anne de Fernandez	416	37.0
SNP	Gordon Mathews	258	23.0
Majority		34	3.0
Turnout		1,124	45.9
Conservative gain from Independent			

Ward 5: Duns and District North
Party	Candidate	Votes	%
Independent	John Elliot	449	38.1
Liberal Democrats	Maureen Ferguson	366	31.0
Conservative	Gavin Calder	93	8.3
Majority		83	7.1
Turnout		1,150	47.3
Independent hold			

Ward 6: Eyemouth and District North
Party	Candidate	Votes	%
Liberal Democrats	George Russell	615	55.0
Conservative	Andrew Morgan	504	45.0
Majority		111	10.0
Turnout		1,119	46.1
Liberal Democrats hold			

Ward 7: Kelso and District North
Party	Candidate	Votes	%
Liberal Democrats	David Lindores	735	60.2
Conservative	Meriel Smith	486	39.8
Majority		249	20.4
Turnout		1,221	44.3
Liberal Democrats hold			

Ward 8: Kelso Central
Party	Candidate	Votes	%
Conservative	Alasdair Hutton	Unopposed	N/A
Conservative gain from Liberal Democrats			

Ward 9: Kelso and District South
Party	Candidate	Votes	%
Liberal Democrats	Alex Nicol	796	55.2
Conservative	Andrew Thomson	646	44.8
Majority		150	10.4
Turnout		442	61.5
Liberal Democrats hold			

Ward 10: Jedburgh and District East
Party	Candidate	Votes	%
Conservative	Sandy Scott	487	46.3
SNP	Natasha York	316	30.1
Liberal Democrats	Ian Tunnah	248	23.6
Majority		171	16.2
Turnout		1,051	46.5
Conservative gain from Liberal Democrats			

Ward 11: Jedburgh and District West
Party	Candidate	Votes	%
Conservative	John Wight	738	61.6
SNP	James Brown	460	38.4
Majority		278	23.2
Turnout		1,198	52.0
Conservative hold			

Ward 12: Hermitage
Party	Candidate	Votes	%
Independent	Val Robson	424	42.0
Liberal Democrats	Anne Borthwick	389	38.6
Conservative	Hubert Rutherford	196	19.4
Majority		35	3.4
Turnout		1,009	47.7
Independent gain from Liberal Democrats			

Ward 13: Burnfoot and Mansfield
Party	Candidate	Votes	%
Independent	David Richardson	401	42.4
Liberal Democrats	Norman Pender	375	39.6
SNP	Harry Stoddart	122	12.9
Conservative	John Lamont	48	5.1
Majority		26	2.8
Turnout		946	45.0
Independent gain from Liberal Democrats			

Ward 14: Silverbuthall
Party	Candidate	Votes	%
Independent	Mary Beck	526	46.2
Liberal Democrats	John Scott	502	44.1
Liberal Democrats	Jake Irvine	110	9.7
Majority		24	2.1
Turnout		1,138	53.0
Independent gain from Liberal Democrats			

Ward 15: Weensland
Party	Candidate	Votes	%
Independent	Kenneth McCartney	664	46.7
Liberal Democrats	James Scott	369	25.9
Conservative	Ms. Alexandra Elliot	299	21.0
SNP	Richard Cain	90	6.3
Majority		295	20.8
Turnout		1,422	59.1
Independent gain from Liberal Democrats			

Ward 16: Teviot and Central
Party	Candidate	Votes	%
Independent	David Paterson	728	63.2
Liberal Democrats	Ronald Smith	325	28.2
Conservative	Andrew Loyd	98	8.5
Majority		403	35.0
Turnout		1,151	52.3
Independent gain from SNP			

Ward 17: Wilton
Party	Candidate	Votes	%
Independent	Andrew Farquhar	526	47.4
Liberal Democrats	Oliver Angus	320	28.8
Conservative	George Turnbull	264	23.8
Majority		206	18.6
Turnout		1,110	50.0
Independent gain from Liberal Democrats			

Ward 18: Galawater and Lauderdale
Party	Candidate	Votes	%
Conservative	Douglas Younger	465	29.4
Independent	Alexander Aitchison	415	26.2
Independent	Graeme Donald	374	23.6
Liberal Democrats	John Runciman	328	20.7
Majority		50	2.8
Turnout		1,572	58.3
Conservative gain from Independent			

Ward 19: Earlston, Gordon and District
Party	Candidate	Votes	%
Conservative	Miles Browne	Unopposed	N/A
Conservative gain from Liberal Democrats			

Ward 20: Melrose and District
Party	Candidate	Votes	%
Independent	William Smith	831	58.5
Conservative	Jonathan Hill	590	41.5
Majority		241	17.0
Turnout		1,421	56.8
Independent hold			

Ward 21: Scott's View
Party	Candidate	Votes	%
Conservative	Carolyn Riddell-Carre	729	57.3
Liberal Democrats	Barbara Wright	543	42.7
Majority		186	14.6
Turnout		1,272	52.8
Conservative gain from Independent			

Ward 22: Alewater and Denholm
Party	Candidate	Votes	%
Liberal Democrats	John Houston	706	51.0
Conservative	John Greenwell	677	49.0
Majority		29	2.0
Turnout		1,383	56.7
Liberal Democrats hold			

Ward 23: Old Selkirk
Party	Candidate	Votes	%
Independent	Gordon Edgar	618	40.7
Independent	John Thomson	544	35.8
Scottish Socialist	Kerry Gentleman	143	9.4
SNP	Alexander McKie	127	8.4
Conservative	Guy Lee	87	5.7
Majority		74	4.9
Turnout		1,519	55.9
Independent hold			

Ward 24: Forest
Party	Candidate	Votes	%
Liberal Democrats	Vicky Davidson	669	46.9
SNP	Christopher Renton	514	36.0
Conservative	Kevin Newton	243	17.0
Majority		155	10.9
Turnout		1,426	53.0
Liberal Democrats gain from SNP			

Ward 25: Netherdale
Party	Candidate	Votes	%
Conservative	Fiona Moore	317	28.3
Independent	Angus MacKay	293	20.1
Independent	John Robertson	261	23.3
Scottish Socialist	Graeme McIver	249	22.2
Majority		24	2.2
Turnout		1,120	46.2
Conservative gain from Independent			

Ward 26: Lower Landlee and Tweedbank
Party	Candidate	Votes	%
Independent	David Parker	1,113	94.2
Conservative	Scott Smith	69	5.8
Majority		1,044	88.4
Turnout		1,182	52.8
Independent gain from SNP			

Ward 27: Upper Langlee and Landhope
Party	Candidate	Votes	%
SNP	John Mitchell	585	65.2
Conservative	Robert Strang	312	34.8
Majority		273	30.4
Turnout		897	41.3
SNP hold			

Ward 28: Kilnknowe and Clovenfords
Party	Candidate	Votes	%
Independent	Thomas Dumble	462	41.8
SNP	Graham Fleming	296	26.8
Conservative	Willie Hall	236	21.4
Scottish Socialist	Joy McLelland	110	10.0
Majority		166	15.0
Turnout		1,104	46.9
Independent hold			

Ward 29: Mossilee and Central
Party	Candidate	Votes	%
Liberal Democrats	William Lamb	355	38.3
SNP	William Herd	271	29.2
Labour	Carolyne Thomson	160	17.2
Conservative	Brian Jones	94	10.1
Scottish Socialist	Lesley McIver	48	5.2
Majority		84	9.1
Turnout		928	43.0
Liberal Democrats hold			

Ward 30: Innerleithen and Walkerburn
Party	Candidate	Votes	%
Liberal Democrats	Patricia Purves	862	57.9
SNP	William Cox	317	21.3
Conservative	John Ballantine	160	10.7
Scottish Socialist	Norman Lockhart	150	10.1
Majority		545	36.6
Turnout		1,489	55.3
Liberal Democrats gain from Independent			

Ward 31: Peebles and District South
Party	Candidate	Votes	%
Liberal Democrats	Graham Garvie	813	50.4
Conservative	Charles Cormack	460	28.5
Independent	Hector Black	341	21.1
Majority		353	21.9
Turnout		1,614	56.6
Liberal Democrats hold			

Ward 32: Peebles and District East
Party	Candidate	Votes	%
Liberal Democrats	Catriona Bhatia	829	56.0
SNP	George Cowan	267	18.0
Conservative	Hilary Ballantine	178	12.0
Labour	John Thomson	139	9.4
Scottish Socialist	Joan Rowley	68	4.6
Majority		562	38.0
Turnout		1,481	54.4
Liberal Democrats gain from Labour			

Ward 33: Peebles and Upper Tweed
Party	Candidate	Votes	%
Independent	Nancy Norman	971	62.0
Conservative	Hugh Seymour	335	21.4
Labour	Julia Reid	260	16.6
Majority		636	40.6
Turnout		1,566	57.5
Independent hold			

Ward 34: West Linton and District
Party	Candidate	Votes	%
Conservative	Neil Calvert	722	44.7
Independent	David Small	634	39.3
Independent	Robert Bond	259	16.0
Majority		88	5.4
Turnout		1,615	59.1
Conservative gain from Independent			
