= Tweeddale West (ward) =

Electoral ward in the Scottish Borders, Scotland

Location of the ward

Tweeddale West is one of the eleven wards used to elect members of the Scottish Borders Council. It elects three Councillors.

== Councillors ==
Election	Councillors		
2007	Willie Archibald (SNP)	Neil Calvert (Conservative)	Catriona Bhatia (Liberal Democrats)
2012	Willie Archibald (SNP)	Nathaniel Buckingham (Conservative)	Catriona Bhatia (Liberal Democrats)
2013 by	Willie Archibald (SNP)	Keith Cockburn (Conservative)	Catriona Bhatia (Liberal Democrats)
2017	Heather Anderson (SNP)	Eric Small (Conservative)	Kris Chapman (Liberal Democrats)
2022	Viv Thomson (SNP)	Eric Small (Conservative)	Drummond Begg (Liberal Democrats)

== Election results ==
=== 2022 Election ===
2022 Scottish Borders Council election

Tweeddale West - 3 seats
Party	Candidate	FPv%	Count				
Party	Candidate	FPv%	1	2	3	4	5
SNP	Viv Thomson	26.2%	1,266				
Liberal Democrats	Drummond Begg	22.8%	1,100	1,107.8	1,257.6		
Conservative	Eric Small (incumbent)	18.5%	893	894.3	915.4	926.6	1,338.5
Green	Dominic Ashmole	16.4%	792	829.3	905.3	926.8	947.3
Conservative	John Smith	9.7%	466	466.4	472.4	476.2	
Labour	Julia Reid	6.5%	312	316.4			
Electorate: 8,517 Valid: 4,829 Spoilt: 58 Quota: 1,208 Turnout: 4,887 (57.4%)

=== 2017 Election ===
2017 Scottish Borders Council election

Tweeddale West - 3 seats
Party	Candidate	FPv%	Count						
Party	Candidate	FPv%	1	2	3	4	5	6	7
SNP	Heather Anderson	25.2%	1,160						
Conservative	Eric Small	22.5%	1,036	1,036.2	1,040.2	1,097.2	1,115.3	1,123.3	1,928.3
Liberal Democrats	Kris Chapman	16.7%	768	769.2	783.2	820.2	891.4	1,073.1	1,192.2
Conservative	John Anderson	21.3%	984	984.2	987.2	1,003.2	1,018.2	1,030.2	
Green	Catriona Hamilton	4.7%	218	221.3	238.4	262.6	332.8		
Labour	Julia Reid	4.4%	201	201.5	205.5	224.6			
Independent	Tommy Davidson	3.7%	170	170.6	190.6				
Independent	Michael Needham	1.6%	73	73.1					
Electorate: 8,167 (Est.) Valid: 4,610 Spoilt: 78 Quota: 1,153 Turnout: 4,688 (57.4%)

=== 2013 By-election ===
Tweeddale West By-election (10 October 2013) - 1 Seat
Party	Candidate	FPv%	Count						
Party	Candidate	FPv%	1	2	3	4	5	6	7
Conservative	Keith Cockburn	42.65	1,155	1,165	1,176	1,193	1,255	1,288	1,616
Liberal Democrats	Nancy Norman	25	677	682	690	759	858	1,034	
SNP	Morag Kerr	13.26	359	369	373	409	444		
Borders	David Pye	8.4	228	237	245	272			
Labour	Veronica McTernan	7.5	203	204	207				
UKIP	Mars Goodman	1.56	43	44					
Independent	David Cox	1.56	43						
Electorate: 7,707 Valid: 2,708 Spoilt: 21 Quota: 1,355 Turnout: 2,729 (35.41%)

=== 2012 Election ===
2012 Scottish Borders Council election

Tweeddale West - 3 seats
Party	Candidate	FPv%	Count				
Party	Candidate	FPv%	1	2	3	4	5
Liberal Democrats	Catriona Bhatia (incumbent)	25.62	919				
Conservative	Nathaniel Buckingham††	24.67	885	887.4	978.6		
SNP	Willie Archibald (incumbent)	21.75	780	782.1	833.4	839.6	934.3
Labour	Julia Reid	9.37	336	337.2	389.3	393.1	
Liberal Democrats	Nancy Norman	9.31	334	347.9	415.5	449.4	548.9
Borders	David Pye	9.28	333	334.4			
Electorate: 7,577 Valid: 3,587 Spoilt: 34 Quota: 897 Turnout: 3,621 (47.34%)

=== 2007 Election ===
2007 Scottish Borders Council election

Scottish Borders council election, 2007: Tweeddale West
Party	Candidate	FPv%	%	Seat	Count
Liberal Democrats	Catriona Bhatia	1,202	25.2	1	1
Conservative	Neil Calvert	1,091	22.9	2	4
SNP	Willie Archibald	784	16.4	3	5
Independent	Nancy Norman	672	14.1		
Independent	Tom Davidson	667	14.0		
Labour	Eamonn O'Neil	356	7.5		
