= Alastair Cranston =

Scotland international rugby union player & SNP politician

- Born: Alastair Gerald Cranston; 11 December 1949 (age 76) Hawick, Scotland

Rugby union career
- Position: Centre
Amateur team(s)
Years	Team	Apps	(Points)
- Hawick
Provincial / State sides
Years	Team	Apps	(Points)
- South of Scotland
International career
Years	Team	Apps	(Points)
1972-74	Scotland 'B'	2	
1976–81	Scotland	11	(0)

Alastair Cranston is a Scottish National Party politician and a councillor on Scottish Borders Council for the Hawick and Denholm ward. He previously was a Scotland international rugby union player.

== Political career ==
Born in Hawick on 11 December 1949, in the Borders Region, he was recruited by the SNP, after failing to win the Scottish Conservative nomination, to contest the Hawick and Denholm ward for the party in the 2012 Scottish Borders Council election. He polled 381 first preferences, and after transfers, secured the last seat in the ward on the sixth count at the expense of the Scottish Liberal Democrats.

After the election the SNP formed a coalition administration with the Lib Dems and with Independents. He is a member of the following committees; Planning and Building Standards, Appeals Panel and Educational Appeals Panel.

== Rugby union career ==
=== Amateur career ===
He played for Hawick.

=== Provincial career ===
He was capped by South of Scotland District.

=== International career ===
He received two caps for Scotland 'B'; both against France 'B'. One came in 1972, the other came in 1974.

He later received full senior caps with Scotland; for whom he played as a Centre and won 19 caps between 1976 and 1981.

=== Administrative career ===
In 2002, he was appointed Chief Executive of the Borders Reivers rugby union team. His tenure lasted until 2005.

== Business career ==
Cranston was a farmer. In 1987 he was one of the founders of the Borders Machinery Ring and would subsequently become Manager. The Borders Machinery Ring was based on a concept in Germany where farmers can share farm machinery and training can also be provided. There are now 9 different machinery rings in Scotland with over 7,000 members.

Of Cranston's concept, Chairman Guy Lee of the BMR stated:

BMR was formed thanks to the ingenuity of Melrose farmer and contractor Alastair Cranston. Alastair had been intrigued by a conference presentation on the subject and subsequently travelled to Germany where there were 260 machinery rings in operation at the time. Alastair brought the concept back home to the Borders, where farmers were initially sceptical of the concept, however BMR was established with 23 founder members, and the rest is history!

Since then Cranston was involved in the development of rural recycling and renewable energy initiatives related to linking communities and agriculture.
