= Leaderdale and Melrose (ward) =

Electoral ward in the Scottish Borders, Scotland

Location of the ward

Leaderdale and Melrose is one of the eleven wards used to elect members of the Scottish Borders Council. It elects three Councillors.

== Councillors ==
Election	Councillors		
2007	David Parker (Ind.)	Nicholas Watson (Borders Party)	John Paton-Day (Liberal Democrats)
2012	David Parker (Ind.)	Nicholas Watson (Borders Party)	Jim Torrance (SNP)
2013	David Parker (Ind.)	Ian Gillespie (Ind.)	Jim Torrance (SNP)
2017	David Parker (Ind.)	Tom Miers (Conservative)	Kevin Drum (SNP)
2022	David Parker (Ind.)	Jenny Linehan (Conservative)	John Paton-Day (SNP)

== Election results ==
=== 2022 Election ===
2022 Scottish Borders Council election

Leaderdale and Melrose - 3 seats
Party	Candidate	FPv%	Count					
Party	Candidate	FPv%	1	2	3	4	5	6
Independent	David Parker (incumbent)	34.3	1,594					
Conservative	Jenny Linehan	24.4	1,133	1,241.4				
SNP	John Paton-Day	19.7	918	1,003.4	1,004.4	1,006.2	284.3	1,180.1
Liberal Democrats	Simon Johnson	12.7	589	686.9	718.7	724.4	791.8	905.9
Labour	Michael Scott	4.5	207	240.3	247.0	250.2	284.3	
Green	Michael Needham	4.3	199	227.7	229.4	231.4		
Vanguard	Chris Stefanek	0.2	10	14.6	16.8			
Electorate: 9,107 Valid: 4,650 Spoilt: 40 Quota: 1,163 Turnout: 51.5%

=== 2017 Election ===
2017 Scottish Borders Council election

Leaderdale and Melrose - 3 seats
Party	Candidate	FPv%	Count						
Party	Candidate	FPv%	1	2	3	4	5	6	7
Independent	David Parker (incumbent)	25.2%	1,149						
Conservative	Tom Miers	20.5%	934	934.9	950.9	1,014	1,476.5		
SNP	Kevin Drum	17.8%	811	812.4	832.5	903.7	910.8	915.5	1,105.3
Independent	Iain Gillespie (incumbent)	11.2%	510	513.3	585.7	720.2	744.4	871.1	
Conservative	Diana Findlay	11.5%	523	523.6	543.7	529.8			
Liberal Democrats	John Paton-Day	9.4%	426	427.5	473.6				
Independent	Rebecca Fraser	4.4%	202	202.7					
Electorate: 8,673 (Est.) Valid: 4,555 Spoilt: 78 Quota: 1,139 Turnout: 4,633 (53.4%)

=== 2013 By-election ===
Leaderdale and Melrose By-election (2 May 2013) - 1 Seat
Party	Candidate	FPv%	Count					
Party	Candidate	FPv%	1	2	3	4	5	6
Conservative	Rachael Hamilton	27.57	956	975	982	1,038	1,283	
Borders	Iain Gillespie	23.48	814	844	900	1,118	1,444	2,066
Liberal Democrats	John Paton-Day	21.46	744	756	816	983		
SNP	Harry Cummings	17.68	613	623	666			
Labour	Robin Tatler	6.78	235	238				
UKIP	Sherry Fowler	3.03	105					
Electorate: 8,386 Valid: 3,467 Spoilt: 20 Quota: 1,734 Turnout: 3,487 (41.58%)

=== 2012 Election ===
2012 Scottish Borders Council election

Leaderdale and Melrose - 3 seats
Party	Candidate	FPv%	Count					
Party	Candidate	FPv%	1	2	3	4	5	6
Independent	David Parker (incumbent)	36.34	1,304					
Borders	Nicholas Watson (incumbent)†	17.31	621	705.9	758.9	929.6		
SNP	Jim Torrance††††	15.55	558	632.4	706.8	742.6	747.6	969.6
Conservative	Peter Duncan	12.29	441	488.3	500.2			
Liberal Democrats	John Paton-Day (incumbent)	12.24	439	527.1	568.3	715.8	726.8	
Labour	Agnes Craig	6.27	225	258.6				
Electorate: 8,292 Valid: 3,588 Spoilt: 21 Quota: 898 Turnout: 3,609 (43.27%)

=== 2007 Election ===
2007 Scottish Borders Council election

Scottish Borders council election, 2007: Leaderdale and Melrose
Party	Candidate	FPv%	%	Seat	Count
Independent	David Parker	1,362	29.9	1	1
Conservative	John Greenwell	713	15.6		
Liberal Democrats	John Paton-Day	703	15.3	2	5
Borders Party	Nicholas Watson	692	15.1	3	5
SNP	Frank McCann	640	14.0		
Independent	Harry Cummings	394	8.6		
Independent	John Rae	78	1.7		
