= Heather Anderson (politician) =

Scottish politician

Heather Anderson MSP
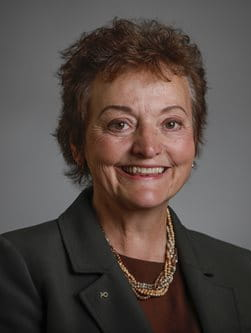
- Official portrait, 2026

Member of the Scottish Parliament for Dundee City West
- Incumbent
- Assumed office 7 May 2026
- Preceded by: Joe FitzPatrick
- Majority: 6,357 (24.5%)

Member of the European Parliament for Scotland
- In office 27 January 2020 – 31 January 2020
- Preceded by: Alyn Smith
- Succeeded by: Constituency abolished

Personal details
- Born: 31 January 1959 (age 67) Dundee, Scotland
- Party: Scottish National Party
- Profession: Farmer

Heather Anderson (born 31 January 1959) is a Scottish National Party (SNP) politician who serves as a Member of the Scottish Parliament for Dundee City West since 2026. She briefly served as the Member of the European Parliament (MEP) for the Scotland constituency in late January 2020.

== Political career ==
Anderson was first elected as a councillor for the Tweeddale West ward at the 2017 Scottish Borders Council election.

She was originally placed fifth on the Scottish National Party list for the 2019 European Parliament election, in which the party won three seats. However, following the election to the UK House of Commons of first-placed Alyn Smith at the 2019 United Kingdom general election, he ceased to be an MEP, since an individual cannot serve as a representative in both a member state's legislature and the European Parliament. Fourth-placed Margaret Ferrier was also elected to the UK parliament at the same election. This made Anderson eligible for the newly vacant SNP seat, which she took up on 27 January 2020. She would, however, serve as an MEP for only four days, until 31 January when the Brexit process completed.

At the 2022 Scottish local elections, Anderson stood as Councillor for the SNP in Dundee City Council. She was elected, winning her seat in the Coldside Ward at first preference with 31.1% of the vote.

Anderson was confirmed as the SNP candidate for Dundee City West at the 2026 Scottish Parliament Election after the announcement that incumbent Joe FitzPatrick would not seek re-election.

Anderson held the seat for the SNP, gaining 49.1% of the vote.

Anderson is a member of the Scottish Parliament's Health, Care and Sport Committee.

== Personal life ==
Anderson previously worked as a Welfare Rights Officer, and co-founded Scottish Human Services Ltd, an organisation which campaign for greater social inclusion in Scotland.

She was also an organic farmer who owned a produce and butcher's shop in the Scottish Borders.
