= Scottish Borders Council =

Scottish local authority

Scottish Borders Council Comhairle Chrìochan na h-Alba

Leadership
- Convener: Watson McAteer, Independent since 19 May 2022
- Leader: Euan Jardine, Conservative since 19 May 2022
- Chief Executive: David Robertson since January 2023

Structure
- Seats: 34 councillors
- Graph of the party split among 33 seats.
- Political groups: All parties (33) Conservative (13) SNP (7) Liberal Democrats (3) Green (1) Independent (9)

Elections
- Voting system: Single transferable vote
- Last election: 5 May 2022
- Next election: 6 May 2027

Meeting place
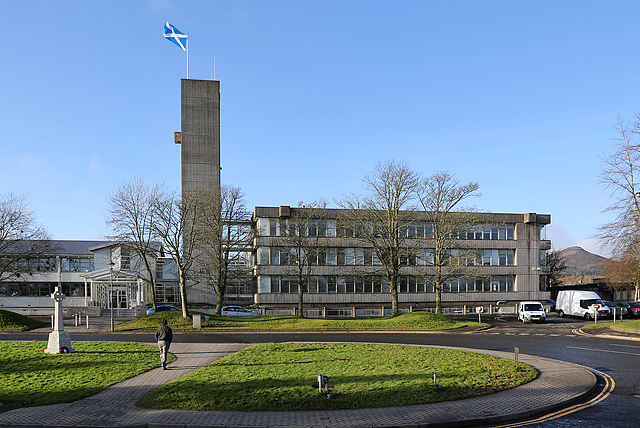
- Council Headquarters, Bowden Road, Newtown St Boswells, Melrose, TD6 0SA

Website
- www.scotborders.gov.uk

Scottish Borders Council is a local authority in the Scottish Borders area of Scotland.

According to the National Records of Scotland, the population of the Scottish Borders was estimated at 116,800 in mid-2025, a decrease of 0.3% from 117,190 in 2024. Between 2001 and 2025, the population increased by 9.2%.

== Historical Administrative Structures ==
The present Scottish Borders Council was created in 1996 following the reorganisation of local government in Scotland. It replaced the former Borders Regional Council and the four district councils of Berwickshire, Ettrick and Lauderdale, Roxburgh and Tweeddale, which had operated under the two-tier system introduced in 1975. The new council area was originally designated "The Borders" in the 1994 legislation, but was renamed "Scottish Borders" on 1 April 1996.

== Services and responsibilities ==
The council's services are organised into seven directorates, covering areas including Education and Children's Services, Adult Social Work and Care, Infrastructure and Environment, Finance, Corporate Governance, and Resilient Communities.

Scottish Borders Council is responsible for a range of local government services within the Scottish Borders, including education, social care, roads and infrastructure, waste management, housing, planning, environmental services, economic development and community services.

=== Official Archives Services ===
The council's archival collections are held at the Scottish Borders Archive, based at the Heritage Hub in Hawick. The collections include historical records relating to local government, education, industry and community organisations, as well as materials used for family history and local research.

=== Leisure Services Trust ===
In 2016, the council established Live Borders, an integrated trust responsible for delivering culture, sport and leisure services on its behalf. These services include libraries, museums and galleries, arts facilities and sports and leisure centres.

=== Flood Protection Infrastructure ===
Flood protection is a significant responsibility of Scottish Borders Council because of the number of communities located along the region's rivers and watercourses. The council is the lead authority for the Tweed Local Flood Risk Management Plan, which covers the majority of the Scottish Borders. It also contributes to plans covering the Solway and Forth Estuary areas. The council has delivered flood protection schemes in several Borders towns, including Galashiels, Selkirk and Jedburgh.

=== Digital Learning Training and Programme Delivery ===
In 2019, the council launched a separate arm to offer digital learning and training called Inspire Learning, a digital education programme providing iPads and supporting infrastructure for schools across the Scottish Borders. The rollout began with secondary school pupils and was expanded to primary school pupils, with the programme's implementation accelerated during the COVID-19 pandemic.

== Estate ==
Scottish Borders Council is based at the Council Headquarters in Newtown St Boswells. The building had been the headquarters of Roxburghshire County Council prior to 1975, and subsequently served as the main office of the Borders Regional Council between 1975 and 1996.

The council's property estate extends across the Scottish Borders and includes administrative buildings, schools, libraries, leisure facilities and other operational and non-operational properties. A significant review of the estate undertaken in 2022 found that the portfolio was ageing and, in some cases, under-used, leading to a large programme of rationalisation, optimisation and decarbonisation from 2024.

== Finances ==
For fiscal year 2026/27, Scottish Borders Council has a net expenditure budget of £418 million. Its largest areas of expenditure include Education and Children's Services, budgeted at £172 million, Adult Services at £88.7 million, and Infrastructure and Environment at £58.8 million.

The council's budget is funded principally through Scottish Government grants, Council Tax and business rates. For 2026/27, the council lists £277.9 million in government grants, £91 million from Council Tax and £47.9 million from business rates.

== Notable disputes and investigations ==
=== Abuse at SBC school: criminal conviction and independent inquiry ===
In 2021, former Scottish Borders Council teacher Linda McCall was convicted of five charges of assault and one charge of threatening or abusive behaviour in connection with incidents involving five children between August 2016 and October 2017. She was sentenced to a community payback order requiring 150 hours of unpaid work. Following the conviction, Scottish Borders Council commissioned an independent inquiry into its handling of concerns raised about McCall's conduct.

The inquiry, led by Andrew Webster QC, examined the council's handling of concerns raised by school staff in October 2017. It found that the concerns should have been referred to the council's child protection unit substantially earlier. Webster described the delay in the inquiry report as "reprehensible" and said that he could not rule out that it had caused unnecessary harm to children and had undoubtedly caused unnecessary distress to parents. The inquiry made ten recommendations concerning the handling of allegations against staff, child protection procedures and training.

Scottish Borders Council accepted all ten recommendations and apologised to the children and their families. Councillors subsequently considered the findings of the independent inquiry and agreed an action plan in response to its recommendations, including additional expenditure on child protection procedures and training.

=== Eyemouth school estate dispute ===
After a decade of community opposition to proposals to incorporate Eyemouth Primary School into a shared campus with Eyemouth High School, Scottish Borders Council agreed in 2026 to pursue a standalone replacement primary school, abandoning its own preferred shared-campus proposal.

=== iPad / Inspire Learning Programme Controversies ===
The council's multi-million pound Inspire Learning programme, which provides iPads to pupils, has attracted significant controversy in 2025-26 over concerns about children's online safety, screen time, educational outcomes and parental choice. In September 2025, The Scotsman reported that children as young as seven could access pornography on council-issued iPads. In April 2026, concerns about gambling-style gaming apps were raised by parents, and in June, parents who raised safety concerns about the devices used in schools were reportedly told they have no right to opt out of any part of the provision, and were directed to consider home schooling instead.

In July 2026, the iPad programme came under renewed safeguarding scrutiny after a primary-school pupil reportedly emailed their alleged child sex offender father using a school-issued iPad email account, the existence of which parents had not been informed of.. In September 2026, The Bureau of Investigative Journalism reported on UK parents' concerns around this style of programme, spotlighting SBC in particular for a lack of evidence for demonstrating its impact on educational attainment and wellbeing.

By October 2026, more than 70 doctors in Scotland had signed a statement supporting a controversial report by NHS Borders Director of Public Health Dr Sohail Bhatti, which had raised direct concerns about the potential health effects of excessive iPad screentime in Borders classrooms. The report identified the council's provision of one-to-one iPads to pupils from Primary 4 as an area of concern, noting that the devices provided access to the internet and online games, calling on SBC for consideration of alternatives to the existing approach.

=== 2026 Ruling of Consultation Maladministration ===
Following the council's decision in April 2025 to proceed with proposals to mothball five rural nursery settings, Councillor Julie Pirone, the council's Executive Member for Education, proposed a motion to set aside that decision. At a special meeting on 9 May, councillors approved the motion, agreeing that the five settings would not be mothballed for the 2025–26 school session while alternative models were explored in consultation with affected families. The subsequent consultation, conducted in May and June 2025, became the subject of a complaint to the Scottish Public Services Ombudsman.

In September 2026, the Scottish Public Services Ombudsman (SPSO) issued its findings and upheld the complaint. The SPSO found shortcomings in the planning, conduct and reporting of the consultation and concluded that the process had been unreasonable and amounted to maladministration. It also identified weaknesses in the recording of meetings and in the reporting of consultation responses to elected members. The council accepted the findings and Chief Executive David Robertson (Council leader) issued a personal apology. It said it would review its Community Engagement Toolkit.

== Political control ==
The council has been under no overall control since 1999. Since the 2022 election the council has been run by an administration of the Conservatives and three of the independent councillors.

The first election to the Borders Regional Council was held in 1974, initially operating as a shadow authority alongside the outgoing authorities until the new system came into force on 16 May 1975. A shadow authority was again elected in 1995 ahead of the reforms which came into force on 1 April 1996. Political control of the council since 1975 has been as follows:

Borders Regional Council
Party in control	Years
Independent	1975–1978
No overall control	1978–1982
Independent	1982–1994
No overall control	1994–1996

Scottish Borders Council
Party in control	Years
Independent	1996–1999
No overall control	1999–present

== Leadership ==
The first leader of the council following the 1996 reforms was Drew Tulley, who had been the last leader of the former Ettrick and Lauderdale District Council. The leaders since 1996 have been:

Councillor	Party	From	To
Drew Tulley	Independent	1 Apr 1996	6 Mar 2002
John Ross Scott	Liberal Democrats	6 Mar 2002	May 2003
David Parker	Independent	12 May 2003	May 2017
Shona Haslam	Conservative	18 May 2017	Nov 2021
Mark Rowley	Conservative	25 Nov 2021	May 2022
Euan Jardine	Conservative	19 May 2022	

== Composition ==
Following the 2022 election and subsequent changes of allegiance up to April 2026, the composition of the council was:

Party	Seats
Conservative	13
SNP	7
Liberal Democrats	3
Green	1
Independent	9
Total	33

Five of the independent councillors sit together as the "Independent Group", two form the "Scottish Borders Independent Group", and the other two are not affiliated to a group. The next elections are in May 2027.

== Elections ==
Since 2007 elections have been held every five years under the single transferable vote system, introduced by the Local Governance (Scotland) Act 2004. Election results since 1995 have been as follows:

Year	Seats	Conservative	SNP	Liberal Democrats	Green	Labour	Independent / Other	Notes
1995	58	3	8	15	0	2	30	
1999	34	1	4	14	0	1	14	New ward boundaries
2003	34	11	1	8	0	0	14	
2007	34	11	6	10	0	0	7	New ward boundaries
2012	34	10	9	6	0	0	9	SNP / Lib Dem / Independent coalition
2017	34	15	9	2	0	0	8	Conservative / Independent coalition
2022	34	14	9	3	1	0	7	Conservative / Independent coalition

== Wards ==
Map of the area's wards

The council area is divided into 11 wards that elect 34 councillors:

Ward Number	Ward Name	Location	Population 2022 Census	Seats
1	Tweeddale West		10,407	3
2	Tweeddale East		10,942	3
3	Galashiels and District		15,336	4
4	Selkirkshire		9,796	3
5	Leaderdale and Melrose		11,391	3
6	Mid Berwickshire		10,645	3
7	East Berwickshire		11,381	3
8	Kelso and District		10,212	3
9	Jedburgh and District		9,003	3
10	Hawick and Denholm		9,159	3
11	Hawick and Hermitage		8,551	3
