= 1995 Scottish Borders Council election =

1995 Scottish local government election

The 1995 Scottish Borders Council election for the Scottish Borders Council took place on Thursday 6 April 1995, alongside elections to the various newly created unitary councils across Scotland.

Independents won 30 of the council's 58 seats.

== Aggregate results ==
Scottish Borders Council election, 1995
Party	Seats	Gains	Losses	Net gain/loss	Seats %	Votes %	Votes	+/−
Independent	30					39.0		
Liberal Democrats	15					24.0		
SNP	8					18.9		
Conservative	3					14.8		
Labour	2					3.3		
