= 1999 Scottish Borders Council election =

1999 Scottish local government election

- 6 May 1999

All 34 seats to Scottish Borders Council 18 seats needed for a majority
	First party	Second party	Third party
Party	Independent	Liberal Democrats	SNP
Seats won	14	14	4
Seat change	▼16	▼1	▼4
Percentage	31.6%	28.1%	18.1%
Swing	▼7.4%	▲4.0%	▼0.8%
	Fourth party	Fifth party
Party	Conservative	Labour
Seats won	1	1
Seat change	▼2	▼1
Percentage	16.9%	15.4%
Swing	▲2.1%	▲2.1%
Council Leader after election
Drew Tulley
Independent

Elections for the Scottish Borders Council took place on Thursday 6 May 1999, alongside the wider Scottish local elections.

No party held a majority, with the largest grouping - local Independents - winning 14 of the council's 34 seats.

== Aggregate results ==
Scottish Borders Council election, 1999
Party	Seats	Gains	Losses	Net gain/loss	Seats %	Votes %	Votes	+/−
Independent	14			▼16		31.6		▼7.4
Liberal Democrats	14			▼1		28.1		▲4.0
SNP	4			▼4		18.1		▼0.8
Conservative	1			▼2		16.9		▲2.1
Labour	1			▼1		5.4		▲2.1
