= Borders Party =

- Leader: Frances Pringle
- Secretary-General: Jim Smith
- Founded: 2006
- Dissolved: 2020
- Headquarters: North Lodge; Torwoodlee; Galashiels; TD1 2NE
- Ideology: Borders regionalism
- Colours: Purple
- Scottish Borders Council: 0 / 34

The Borders Party was a political party involved in local government in the Scottish Borders area of Scotland. The party returned two councillors to the Scottish Borders Council in 2007 and again in 2012.

== History ==
In April 2006, Save Scott's Countryside (SSC), a campaign group opposed to the Borders Railway and a local housing development, announced their intention to field candidates at the upcoming election. The party was launched in October 2006. At their launch their stated ambitions were around local government becoming more responsive to community need. The party remained opposed to the rail link to Edinburgh and in favour of regionalism.

The Borders Party contested the 2007 Scottish Borders Council election and returned two councillors.

The party also contested each ward in the 2012 Scottish Borders Council election returning Sandy Aitchison and Nicholas Watson to their respective wards for a second term. The two councillors joined a coalition administration as independents.

In August 2012, Borders Party Cllr Nicholas Watson announced he would be leaving the area to pursue employment in Cumbria. He resigned his seat on the Council the following February. The by-election for the Leaderdale and Melrose ward was won by Iain Gillespie, also of the Borders Party, on 2 May 2013. Frances Pringle took over as leader.

The Borders Party were part of the Independent group on the council.

At the 2017 local elections Gillespie and Aitchison stood as independent candidates.

The party was deregistered by the Electoral Commission in November 2020.
