= 2022 Scottish Borders Council election =

2022 Scottish local government election

- 5 May 2022

All 34 seats to Scottish Borders Council 18 seats needed for a majority
	First party	Second party	Third party
	CON	SNP	IND
Leader	Euan Jardine	Elaine Thornton-Nicol	David Parker
Party	Conservative	SNP	Independent
Leader's seat	Galashiels and District	Selkirkshire	Leaderdale and Melrose
Last election	15	9	8
Seats before	15	9	8
Seats after	14	9	7
Seat change	▼1	Steady	▼1
Popular vote	13,992	9,475	10,912
Percentage	31.0%	21.0%	24.2%
Swing	▼10.6%	▼0.4%	▲0.4%
	Fourth party	Fifth party
	LD	GRN
Party	Liberal Democrats	Green
Last election	2	0
Seats before	2	0
Seats after	3	1
Seat change	▲1	▲1
Popular vote	4,416	3,627
Percentage	9.8%	8.0%
Swing	▲1.6%	▲5.8%
- Results by ward.
Council Leader before election
Mark Rowley
Conservative
Council Leader after election
Euan Jardine
Conservative

2022 Elections to Scottish Borders Council were held on 5 May 2022, the same day as the other Scottish local elections.

The Scottish Greens won their first ever seat on the council.

Following the election, an administration was formed with the Conservatives and Independent Councillors Caroline Cochrane, Stuart Marshall, and Watson McAteer.

Conservative Councillors Euan Jardine from Galashiels & District, and Scott Hamilton from Jedburgh & District, were elected as Leader and Deputy Leader of the Council respectively. Independent Councillor Watson McAteer was elected as Convener.

== Results ==
2022 Scottish Borders Council election result
Party	Seats	Gains	Losses	Net gain/loss	Seats %	Votes %	Votes	+/−
Conservative	14	0	1	▼1	41.2	31.0	13,992	▼10.6
SNP	9	0	0	Steady	26.5	21.0	9,475	▼0.4
Independent	7	0	1	▼1	20.6	24.2	10,912	▲0.4
Liberal Democrats	3	1	0	▲1	8.82	9.8	4,416	▲1.6
Green	1	1	0	▲1	2.9	8.0	3,627	▲5.8
Labour	0	0	0	Steady	0.0	5.2	2,345	▲3.4
Scottish Family	0	0	0	Steady	0.0	0.4	179	New
Alba	0	0	0	Steady	0.0	0.1	53	New
Vanguard Party	0	0	0	Steady	0.0	0.2	74	New
Scottish Eco Federalist Party	0	0	0	Steady	0.0	0.05	24	New

Note: "Votes" are the first preference votes. The net gain/loss and percentage changes relate to the result of the previous Scottish local elections on 4 May 2017. This may differ from other published sources showing gain/loss relative to seats held at dissolution of Scotland's councils.

== Ward results ==
=== Tweeddale West ===
- 2017: 1xLib Dem; 1xCon; 1xSNP
- 2022: 1xLib Dem; 1xCon; 1xSNP
- 2017-2022 Change: No Change

Tweeddale West - 3 seats
Party	Candidate	FPv%	Count				
Party	Candidate	FPv%	1	2	3	4	5
SNP	Viv Thomson	26.2	1,266				
Liberal Democrats	Drummond Begg	22.8	1,100	1,107.8	1,257.6		
Conservative	Eric Small	18.5	893	894.3	915.4	926.6	1,338.5
Green	Dominic Ashmole	16.4	792	829.3	905.3	926.8	947.3
Conservative	John Smith	9.7	466	466.4	472.4	476.2	
Labour	Julia Reid	6.5	312	316.4			
Electorate: 8,517 Valid: 4,829 Spoilt: 58 Quota: 1,208 Turnout: 57.4%

=== Tweeddale East ===
- 2017: 1xCon; 1xSNP; 1xInd
- 2022: 1xSNP; 1xCon; 1xInd
- 2017-2022 Change: No Change

Tweeddale East - 3 seats
Party	Candidate	FPv%	Count				
Party	Candidate	FPv%	1	2	3	4	5
SNP	Marshall Douglas	30.3	1,485				
Conservative	Julie Pirone	22.5	1,102	1,106.7	1,107.7	1,148.6	1,253.3
Independent	Robin Tatler	18.3	896	929.9	933.6	1,031.7	1,293.7
Liberal Democrats	David Pye	9.9	483	506.2	507.2	649.1	
Green	Ellie Clarke	9.6	469	604.7	607	718.3	
Labour	Robert Bon	9.2	449	481.2	482.2		
Vanguard	Calum Watt	0.2	11	11.9			
Electorate: 9,117 Valid: 4,895 Spoilt: 24 Quota: 1,224 Turnout: 54.0%

=== Galashiels and District ===
- 2017: 1xSNP; 1xCon; 2xIndependent
- 2022: 1xSNP; 1xCon; 1xLib Dem, 1XGrn
- 2017-2022 Change: Lib Dem and Green gain one seat each from Independents.

Galashiels and District - 4 seats
Party	Candidate	FPv%	Count							
Party	Candidate	FPv%	1	2	3	4	5	6	7	8
SNP	Fay Sinclair	35.9	1,637							
Conservative	Euan Jardine (incumbent)	26.4	1,205							
Liberal Democrats	Hannah Steel	10.6	483	581.8	658.6	662.8	667.1	697.1	777.4	995.6
Green	Neil MacKinnon	9.0	412	786.2	796.7	809.9	814.8	855.9	889.8	984.4
Independent	Bill White	6.9	315	364.6	415.9	416.2	426.6	508.9	706.3	
Independent	Harry Scott	5.4	246	272.6	314.6	318.8	321.3	398.6		
Independent	Duck Frater	4.4	199	230.0	252.9	257.5	272.5			
Vanguard	Michael Banks	0.8	36	43.5	47.9	49.8				
Scottish Eco Federalist Party	James Clark	0.5	24	30.2	32.9					
Electorate: 11,639 Valid: 4,557 Spoilt: 43 Quota: 912 Turnout: 39.5%

=== Selkirkshire ===
- 2017: 1xCon; 1xSNP; 1xIndependent
- 2022: 1xIndependent; 1xCon; 1xSNP;
- 2017-2022 Change: Independent (Cochrane) gains from Independent (Edgar).

Selkirkshire - 3 seats
Party	Candidate	FPv%	Count			
Party	Candidate	FPv%	1	2	3	4
Independent	Caroline Cochrane	35.5	1,423			
Conservative	Leagh Douglas	26.2	1,049			
SNP	Elaine Thornton-Nicol (incumbent)	21.8	873	943.7	945.1	1,073.2
Labour	Scott Redpath	5.6	223	280.7	286.7	336.6
Green	Barbra Harvie	5.5	222	266.1	268.2	
Independent	Gordon Edgar (incumbent)	5.4	217	310.2	327.3	371.7
Electorate: 8,018 Valid: 4,007 Spoilt: 34 Quota: 1,002 Turnout: 50.4%

=== Leaderdale and Melrose ===
- 2017: 1xIndependent; 1xCon; 1xSNP
- 2022: 1xIndependent; 1xCon; 1xSNP
- 2017-2022 Change: No Change

Leaderdale and Melrose - 3 seats
Party	Candidate	FPv%	Count					
Party	Candidate	FPv%	1	2	3	4	5	6
Independent	David Parker (incumbent)	34.3	1,594					
Conservative	Jenny Linehan	24.4	1,133	1,241.4				
SNP	John Paton-Day	19.7	918	1,003.4	1,004.4	1,006.2	1,111.2	1,180.1
Liberal Democrats	Simon Johnson	12.7	589	686.9	718.7	724.4	791.8	905.9
Labour	Michael Scott	4.5	207	240.3	247.0	250.2	284.3	
Green	Michael Needham	4.3	199	227.7	229.4	231.4		
Vanguard	Chris Stefanek	0.2	10	14.6	16.8			
Electorate: 9,107 Valid: 4,650 Spoilt: 40 Quota: 1,163 Turnout: 51.5%

=== Mid Berwickshire ===
- 2017: 2xCon; 1xSNP
- 2022: 2xCon; 1xSNP
- 2017-2022 Change: No change

Mid Berwickshire - 3 seats
Party	Candidate	FPv%	Count						
Party	Candidate	FPv%	1	2	3	4	5	6	7
Conservative	John Greenwell (incumbent)	29.0	1,213						
SNP	Donald Moffat (incumbent)	25.8	1,079						
Conservative	Mark Rowley (incumbent)	17.1	715	842.8	844.3	891.1	919.3	942.4	1,162.9
Liberal Democrats	Yvonne Huggins-Haig	11.5	479	491.3	496.5	519.4	620.9	829.6	
Green	Gail Jackson	6.9	292	294.8	309.3	328.1	396.7		
Labour	David Smith	6.1	254	259.1	264.1	272.3			
Scottish Family	Hamish Goldie-Scot	3.5	146	148.4	149.6				
Electorate: 8,817 Valid: 4,178 Spoilt: 81 Quota: 1,045 Turnout: 48.3%

=== East Berwickshire ===
- 2017: 2 x Conservative; 1 x SNP
- 2022: 1 x Conservative; 1x SNP; 1 x Independent
- 2017-2022 Change: 1 x Independent gain from Conservative

East Berwickshire - 3 seats
Party	Candidate	FPv%	Count							
Party	Candidate	FPv%	1	2	3	4	5	6	7	8
Conservative	Carol Hamilton (incumbent)	31.3	1,328							
SNP	Aileen Orr	21.2	899	901.2	904.2	995.2	1,078.8			
Independent	James Anderson	13.3	562	572.7	576.7	604.7	668.9	672.7	913.7	1,123.7
Independent	Raquel Lloyd-Jones	10.9	466	483.6	487.8	525.4	615.8	620.9		
Conservative	Lynda Jones	9.7	409	624.5	632.3	643.3	666.3	666.9	757.9	
Labour	Paul Stirton	6.9	296	299.8	300.8	355.2				
Green	Peter Guthrie	5.8	245	248.0	249.2					
Scottish Family	Edward Prentice	0.8	33	35.0						
Electorate: 9,029 Valid: 4,238 Spoilt: 49 Quota: 1,060 Turnout: 47.5%

=== Kelso and District ===
- 2017: 2 x Conservative, 1 x Liberal Democrat
- 2022: 2 x Conservative, 1 x Liberal Democrat
- 2017-2022 Change: No Change

Kelso and District - 3 seats
Party	Candidate	FPv%	Count						
Party	Candidate	FPv%	1	2	3	4	5	6	7
Liberal Democrats	Euan Robson (incumbent)	29.8	1,169						
Conservative	Tom Weatherston (incumbent)	24.0	942	987.7					
Conservative	Simon Mountford (incumbent)	23.1	904	926.8	932.2	932.2	937.1	973.8	1,111.3
Green	Shelagh King	13.2	518	560.9	561.1	564.6	575.2	736.2	
Labour	Wilson George	7.7	301	331.2	331.4	336.7	392.3		
Labour	Kenryck Lloyd-Jones	1.8	69	81.7	81.8	82.3			
Vanguard	Sunny Smith	0.4	17	19.3	19.3				
Electorate: 8,499 Valid: 3,920 Spoilt: 70 Quota: 981 Turnout: 46.9%

=== Jedburgh and District ===
- 2017: 2 x Conservative, 1 x SNP
- 2022: 2 x Conservative, 1 x SNP
- 2017-2022 Change: No change

Jedburgh and District - 3 seats
Party	Candidate	FPv%	Count						
Party	Candidate	FPv%	1	2	3	4	5	6	7
Conservative	Scott Hamilton (incumbent)	31.1	1,089						
SNP	Pam Brown	23.1	809	814.3	829.5	840.5	930.5		
Conservative	Sandy Scott (incumbent)	19.2	675	823.5	827.9	840.4	858.4	860.8	1,076.9
Independent	John Bathgate	15.1	529	558.0	564.8	614.9	706.3	726.9	
Green	Charles Strang	7.1	250	254.5	261.5	273.9			
Independent	Jesse Rae	2.9	102	106.5	110.7				
Alba	Yvonne Ridley	1.5	53	55.5					
Electorate: 7,212 Valid: 3,507 Spoilt: 53 Quota: 877 Turnout: 49.4%

=== Hawick and Denholm ===
- 2017: 1 x Independent; 1 x Conservative, 1 x SNP
- 2022: 2 x Independent; 1 x Conservative
- 2017-2022 Change: 1 x Independent gain from SNP

Hawick and Denholm - 3 seats
Party	Candidate	FPv%	Count					
Party	Candidate	FPv%	1	2	3	4	5	6
Independent	Stuart Marshall (incumbent)	69.2	2,265					
Independent	Clair Ramage (incumbent)*	9.7	316	899.9				
Conservative	Neil Richards (incumbent)	9.4	309	441.2	451.3	465.9	541.4	680.2
Green	Catriona Hamilton	4.5	147	224.3	242.4	312.5	375.8	
Labour	Kay Hughes	3.7	120	188.9	197.9			
Independent	Trevor Adams	3.5	114	232.8	253.3	291.8		
Electorate: 7,173 Valid: 3,271 Spoilt: 30 Quota: 818 Turnout: 46.0%

- Clair Ramage was elected as an SNP Councillor in the 2017 election for Hawick & Denholm

=== Hawick and Hermitage ===
- 2017: 2 x Independent; 1 x Conservative
- 2022: 1 x Independent; 1 x Conservative; 1 x SNP
- 2017-2022 Change: 1 x SNP gain from Independent

Hawick and Hermitage - 3 seats
Party	Candidate	FPv%	Count					
Party	Candidate	FPv%	1	2	3	4	5	6
Independent	Watson McAteer (incumbent)	48.5	1,477					
Conservative	Jane Cox	18.4	560	674.2	681.2	692.2	732.4	904.1
SNP	Annette Smart	16.7	509	565.2	607.9	638.3	671.6	765.4
Independent	Cameron Knox	6.3	191	522.6	534.4	555.7	601.2	
Labour	Robert Leach	3.7	114	131.4	148.9			
Liberal Democrats	Rosemary Webster	3.7	113	153.2	162.6	202.4		
Green	Kevin Ferguson	2.7	81	101.8				
Electorate: 7,070 Valid: 3,045 Spoilt: 32 Quota: 762 Turnout: 43.5%
