= 2017 Scottish Borders Council election =

2017 Scottish local government election

- 4 May 2017

All 34 seats to Scottish Borders Council 18 seats needed for a majority
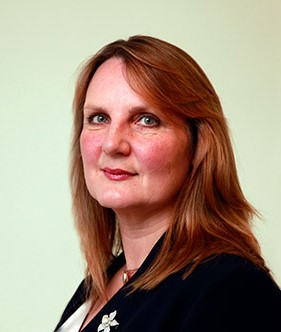
	First party	Second party
		SNP
Leader	Michelle Ballantyne	Stuart Bell
Party	Conservative	SNP
Leader's seat	Selkirkshire	Tweeddale East
Seats before	10	9
Seats after	15	9
Seat change	▲5	Steady
Popular vote	19,355	9,954
Percentage	41.6%	21.4%
Swing	▲18.4%	▲0.7%
	Third party	Fourth party
	IND	LD
Leader	David Parker	Kris Chapman
Party	Independent	Liberal Democrats
Leader's seat	Leaderdale and Melrose	Tweeddale West
Seats before	7	6
Seats after	8	2
Seat change	▲1	▼4
Popular vote	11,050	3.818
Percentage	23.8%	8.2%
Swing	▲1.1%	▼8.3%
- The 11 multi-member wards
Council Leader before election
David Parker
Independent
Council Leader after election
Shona Haslam
Conservative

2017 Elections to Scottish Borders Council were held on 4 May 2017, the same day as the other Scottish local government elections. The election used the 11 wards created as a result of the Local Governance (Scotland) Act 2004, with each ward electing three or four Councillors using the single transferable vote system, a form of proportional representation, with 34 councillors elected.

Following the 2012 election, the Scottish National Party formed a coalition with the support of the Independents and the Liberal Democrats. The Borders Party also supported this administration. This replaced the previous Conservative-Lib Dem-Independent coalition which existed from 2007-2012.

The council was the first to reveal its administration after the election, with the Conservative group forming a coalition with independents to rule the council. New Tweeddale East councillor Shona Haslam became its leader formally on 18 May. Outgoing independent leader, David Parker, become the council's new convener.

== Election results ==
Scottish Borders local election result 2017
Party	Seats	Gains	Losses	Net gain/loss	Seats %	Votes %	Votes	+/−
Conservative	15	5	0	+5	44.1	41.6	19,355	+18.4
SNP	9	1	1	0	26.5	21.4	9,959	+0.7
Independent	8	3	2	+1	23.5	23.8	11,050	+1.1
Liberal Democrats	2	0	4	-4	5.9	8.2	3,818	-8.3
Labour	0	-	-	-	0.0	2.8	1,283	-3.5
Green	0	-	-	-	0.0	2.2	1,030	+1.8

== Ward results ==
=== Tweeddale West ===
- 2012: 1xLib Dem; 1xCon; 1xSNP
- 2017: 1xLib Dem; 1xCon; 1xSNP
- 2012-2017 Change: No Change

Tweeddale West - 3 seats
Party	Candidate	FPv%	Count						
Party	Candidate	FPv%	1	2	3	4	5	6	7
SNP	Heather Anderson	25.2%	1,160						
Conservative	Eric Small	22.5%	1,036	1,036.2	1,040.2	1,097.2	1,115.3	1,123.3	1,928.3
Liberal Democrats	Kris Chapman	16.7%	768	769.2	783.2	820.2	891.4	1,073.1	1,192.2
Conservative	John Anderson	21.3%	984	984.2	987.2	1,003.2	1,018.2	1,030.2	
Green	Catriona Hamilton	4.7%	218	221.3	238.4	262.6	332.8		
Labour	Julia Reid	4.4%	201	201.5	205.5	224.6			
Independent	Tommy Davidson	3.7%	170	170.6	190.6				
Independent	Michael Needham	1.6%	73	73.1					
Electorate: 8,167 (Est.) Valid: 4,610 Spoilt: 78 Quota: 1,153 Turnout: 4,688 (57.4%)

=== Tweeddale East ===
- 2012: 1xSNP; 1xCon; 1xLib Dem
- 2017: 1xCon; 1xSNP; 1xIndependent
- 2012-2017 Change: Independent gain one seat from Lib Dem

Tweeddale East
Party	Candidate	FPv%	Count				
Party	Candidate	FPv%	1	2	3	4	5
Conservative	Shona Haslam	37.6%	1,804				
SNP	Stuart Bell (incumbent)	20%	960	971.7	1,442.7		
Independent	Robin Tatler	16.5%	793	970.4	1,013.7	1,093.4	1,701.3
Liberal Democrats	Amanda Kubie	13.6%	650	881.7	931.1	1,003.5	
SNP	Simon Ritchie	12.2%	585	590.7			
Electorate: 8,640 (Est.) Valid: 4,792 Spoilt: 46 Quota: 1,199 Turnout: 4,838 (56%)

=== Galashiels and District ===
- 2012: 2xSNP; 1xBP; 1xIndependent
- 2017: 1xSNP; 1xCon; 2xIndependent
- 2012-2017 Change: Independent and Con gain one seat from SNP and BP

Galashiels and District - 4 seats
Party	Candidate	FPv%	Count						
Party	Candidate	FPv%	1	2	3	4	5	6	7
Conservative	Euan Jardine	28.5%	1,292						
SNP	Andy Anderson	20%	907						
Independent	Sandy Aitchison (incumbent)	11.9%	539	612.9	640.3	732.4	916.2		
Independent	Harry Scott	10.1%	460	517.8	532.4	592.4	753.1	757	988.3
SNP	John Mitchell (incumbent)	11.5%	523	530.4	558.9	597.7	647.3		
Independent	Bill White (incumbent)	8.7%	396	441.3	462.1	522			
Liberal Democrats	Caledonia Bhatia	5.5%	249	316	369.2				
Labour	David Sharp	3.7%	167	188.5					
Electorate: 10,980 (Est.) Valid: 4,533 Spoilt: 66 Quota: 907 Turnout: 4,599 (41.9%)

=== Selkirkshire ===
- 2012: 1xCon; 1xLib Dem; 1xIndependent
- 2017: 1xCon; 1xSNP; 1xIndependent
- 2012-2017 Change: SNP gain one seat from Lib Dem

Selkirkshire - 3 seats
Party	Candidate	FPv%	Count								
Party	Candidate	FPv%	1	2	3	4	5	6	7	8	9
Conservative	Michelle Ballantyne† (incumbent)	27%	1,081								
SNP	Elaine Thornton-Nicol	22.2%	888	889	941	956	983	1,031			
Independent	Gordon Edgar (incumbent)	12.8%	514	524	531	569	607	646	652	847	1,083
Conservative	Trevor Adams	15.1%	606	661	663	675	694	713	713	763	
Independent	Kenneth Gunn	9.8%	392	396	403	417	429	456	464		
Labour	Scott Redpath	3.7%	147	148	165	176	219				
Liberal Democrats	Nancy Norman	3.3%	134	136	163	171					
Independent	David Black	3.1%	123	124	125						
Green	Barbra Harvie	3%	122	123							
Electorate: 7,752 (Est.) Valid: 4,007 Spoilt: 86 Quota: 1,002 Turnout: 4,093 (52.8%)

=== Leaderdale and Melrose ===
- 2012: 1xIndependent; 1xBP; 1xSNP
- 2017: 1xIndependent; 1xCon; 1xSNP
- 2012-2017 Change: Con gain one seat from BP

Leaderdale and Melrose - 3 seats
Party	Candidate	FPv%	Count						
Party	Candidate	FPv%	1	2	3	4	5	6	7
Independent	David Parker (incumbent)	25.2%	1,149						
Conservative	Tom Miers	20.5%	934	934.9	950.9	1,014	1,476.5		
SNP	Kevin Drum††	17.8%	811	812.4	832.5	903.7	910.8	915.5	1,105.3
Independent	Iain Gillespie (incumbent)	11.2%	510	513.3	585.7	720.2	744.4	871.1	
Conservative	Diana Findlay	11.5%	523	523.6	543.7	529.8			
Liberal Democrats	John Paton-Day	9.4%	426	427.5	473.6				
Independent	Rebecca Fraser	4.4%	202	202.7					
Electorate: 8,673 (Est.) Valid: 4,555 Spoilt: 78 Quota: 1,139 Turnout: 4,633 (53.4%)

=== Mid Berwickshire ===
- 2012: 1xSNP; 1xCon; 1xLib Dem
- 2017: 2xCon; 1xSNP
- 2012-2017 Change: Con gain one seat from Lib Dem

Mid Berwickshire - 3 seats
Party	Candidate	FPv%	Count					
Party	Candidate	FPv%	1	2	3	4	5	6
Conservative	John Greenwell (incumbent)	35.1%	1,592					
Conservative	Mark Rowley	24.1%	1,096	1,434.3				
SNP	Donald Moffat (incumbent)	21.2%	962	983.2	995.3	1,022.9	1,124.7	1,435.7
Liberal Democrats	Frances Renton (incumbent)	11.9%	539	576.5	665	728.6	816.2	
Green	Pauline Stewart	3.9%	177	181	201	249		
Labour	David Smith	3.9%	175	180.4	199.8			
Electorate: 8,494 (Est.) Valid: 4,541 Spoilt: 96 Quota: 1,136 Turnout: 4,637 (54.6%)

=== East Berwickshire ===
- 2012: 1 x Independent, 1 x Conservative, 1 x SNP
- 2017: 2 x Conservative, 1 x SNP
- 2012-2017 Change: 1 x Conservative gain from Independent

East Berwickshire - 3 seats
Party	Candidate	FPv%	Count						
Party	Candidate	FPv%	1	2	3	4	5	6	7
Conservative	Jim Fullarton (incumbent)	35.6%	1,505						
Conservative	Carol Hamilton	23.1%	979	1,357					
SNP	Helen Laing	19.6%	831	835	841	893	932	1,001	1,203
Liberal Democrats	Danny Robertson	6.5%	276	296	352	398	475	627	
Labour	Eddy Coulson	7.1%	301	309	328	359	408		
Independent	Michael Clift	4.2%	178	185	233	259			
Green	Kate Duncan	3.8%	162	166	178				
Electorate: TBC Valid: 4,232 Spoilt: 66 Quota: 1,059 Turnout: 49.0%

=== Kelso and District ===
- 2012: 2 x Conservative, 1 x Liberal Democrat
- 2017: 2 x Conservative, 1 x Liberal Democrat
- 2012-2017 Change: No Change

Kelso and District - 3 seats
Party	Candidate	FPv%	Count							
Party	Candidate	FPv%	1	2	3	4	5	6	7	8
Conservative	Tom Weatherston (incumbent)	28%	1,212							
Conservative	Simon Mountford (incumbent)	25%	1,083							
Liberal Democrats	Euan Robson	14.7%	636	675	675	700	741	788	955	1,370
SNP	Alison Lamond	16.5%	713	715	715	731	749	809	850	
Independent	Ian Aitchison	7.7%	333	362	362	389	401	424		
Green	Colin Shaughnessy	3%	129	133	133	144	164			
Labour	Sally Prentice	2.7%	116	119	119	124				
Independent	Colin McGrath	2.4%	104	114	114					
Electorate: TBC Valid: 4,326 Spoilt: 89 Quota: 1,082 Turnout: 53.1%

=== Jedburgh and District ===
- 2012: 1 x SNP, 1 x Conservative, 1 x Independent
- 2017: 2 x Conservative, 1 x SNP
- 2012-2017 Change: 1 x Conservative from Independent

Jedburgh and District - 3 seats
Party	Candidate	FPv%	Count						
Party	Candidate	FPv%	1	2	3	4	5	6	7
Conservative	Sandy Scott (incumbent)	28.5%	1,094						
Conservative	Scott Hamilton	26.8%	1,026						
SNP	Jim Brown (incumbent)	19.7%	755	759	760	768	795	877	1,150
Independent	Rory Stewart (incumbent)	15.6%	600	633	657	708	747	801	
Green	Charles Strang	4.5%	171	179	183	185	218		
Labour	Kenryck Lloyd-Jones	3.1%	119	128	133	135			
Independent	Harvey Oliver	1.8%	70	82	90				
Electorate: TBC Valid: 3,835 Spoilt: 56 Quota: 959 Turnout: 54.4%

=== Hawick and Denholm ===
- 2012: 1 x Independent, 1 x Conservative, 1 x SNP
- 2017: 1 x Independent, 1 x Conservative, 1 x SNP
- 2012-2017 Change: No Change

Hawick and Denholm - 3 seats
Party	Candidate	FPv%	Count					
Party	Candidate	FPv%	1	2	3	4	5	6
Independent	Stuart Marshall (incumbent)	63.3%	2,283					
Conservative	Neil Richards	16.5%	596	952				
SNP	Clair Ramage	13.3%	478	696	697	738	764	905
Liberal Democrats	Ian Turnbull	3.9%	140	393	410	432	471	
Labour	David Byrne	1.6%	57	98	101	114		
Green	Kevin Ferguson	1.4%	51	93	95			
Electorate: TBC Valid: 3,605 Spoilt: 26 Quota: 902 Turnout: 50.9%

=== Hawick and Hermitage ===
- 2012: 1 x Independent, 1 x Liberal Democrat, 1 x Conservative
- 2017: 2 x Independent, 1 x Conservative
- 2012-2017 Change: 1 x Independent gain from Liberal Democrats

Hawick and Hermitage - 3 seats
Party	Candidate	FPv%	Count	
Party	Candidate	FPv%	1	2
Independent	Watson McAteer *	43.2%	1,496	
Conservative	George Turnbull (incumbent)	26.4%	912	
Independent	Davie Paterson (incumbent)	19.2%	665	936
SNP	Iain Whyte	11.2%	386	482
Electorate: TBC Valid: 3,459 Spoilt: 53 Quota: 865 Turnout: 50.3%

- Sitting Councillor from Hawick and Denholm Ward.

== Changes since 2017 ==
- † On 4 December 2017, Selkirkshire Conservative Cllr Michelle Ballantyne resigned her seat upon her election to the Scottish Parliament. A by-election was held on 22 February 2018 and the seat was won by Independent candidate, Caroline Penman.
- †† On 9 March 2020, it was announced that Leaderdale and Melrose SNP Cllr Kevin Drum had died over the weekend. A by-election took place a year later in March 2021 and was won by the Scottish Conservatives.

== By-elections since 2017 ==
Selkirkshire By-election (22 February 2018)
Party	Candidate	FPv%	Count						
Party	Candidate	FPv%	1	2	3	4	5	6	7
Conservative	Trevor Adams	39.9	1,380	1,251	1,262	1,276	1,307	1,342	
Independent	Caroline Penman	29.7	1,040	1,049	1,080	1,125	1,231	1,522	2,028
SNP	John Mitchell	19.8	691	717	729	758	797		
Independent	Kenneth Gunn	6.3	219	226	238	249			
Labour	Scott Redpath	3.8	134	144	158				
Liberal Democrats	Jack Clark	2.7	95	103					
Green	Barbra Harvie	2.0	70						
Valid: 3,496 Spoilt: 44 Quota: 1,749 Turnout: 3,536 (45.1%)

Leaderdale and Melrose By-election (11 March 2021)
Party	Candidate	FPv%	Count						
Party	Candidate	FPv%	1	2	3	4	5	6	7
Conservative	Jenny Linehan	39.9	1,380	1,389	1,399	1,406	1,451	1,653	1,969
SNP	John Paton-Day	30.2	1,042	1,051	1,069	1,120	1,156	1,297	
Liberal Democrats	Jonny Adamson	15.6	538	542	566	615	682		
Independent	Mary Douglas	4.6	159	177	194	224			
Green	Michael Needham	4.4	152	155	175				
Labour	Scott Redpath	3.3	115	120					
Independent	Karen Wilks	2.0	69						
Electorate: TBC Quota: 1,728 Turnout: (38.2%)
