= 2012 Scottish Borders Council election =

2012 Scottish local government election

← 2007	3 May 2012	2017 →

All 34 seats to Scottish Borders Council 18 seats needed for a majority
	First party	Second party	Third party
Leader	Jim Fullarton	John Mitchell	David Parker
Party	Conservative	SNP	Independent
Leader's seat	East Berwickshire	Galashiels and District	Leaderdale and Melrose
Last election	11 seats, 32.4%	6 seats, 17.6%	5 seats, 14.7%
Seats before	12	6	4
Seats won	10	9	7
Seat change	▼1	▲3	▲2
Popular vote	8,644	7,723	8,454
Percentage	23.2%	20.8%	22.7%
Swing	▼3.6%	▲2.0%	▼1.6%
	Fourth party	Fifth party
Leader	Graham Garvie	Sandy Aitchison
Party	Liberal Democrats	Borders
Leader's seat	Tweeddale East	Galashiels and District
Last election	10 seats, 29.4%	2 seats, 5.9%
Seats before	10	2
Seats won	6	2
Seat change	▼4	0
Popular vote	6,138	3,755
Percentage	16.5%	10.1%
Swing	▼8.1%	▲4.8%
- The 11 multi-member wards
Council Leader before election
David Parker
Independent
Council Leader after election
David Parker
Independent

2012 Elections to Scottish Borders Council were held on 3 May 2012, the same day as the other Scottish local government elections. The election used the 11 wards created as a result of the Local Governance (Scotland) Act 2004, with each ward electing three or four Councillors using the single transferable vote system, a form of proportional representation, with 34 Councillors elected.

The election saw the Scottish Conservative Party remain the largest party on the Council though they lost 1 seat. The Scottish National Party replaced the Scottish Liberal Democrats as the second largest party by gaining 3 seats at the expense of the latter. The Lib Dems were reduced to 6 seats. Independents increased their numbers to 7 seats while the Borders Party retained their 2 seats.

Following the election the Scottish National Party formed a coalition with the support of the Independents and the Liberal Democrats. The Borders Party are also supporting this administration. This replaced the previous Conservative-Lib Dem-Independent coalition which existed from 2007-2012.

== Election results ==
Scottish Borders local election result 2012
Party	Seats	Gains	Losses	Net gain/loss	Seats %	Votes %	Votes	+/−
Conservative	10	1	2	-1	29.41	23.22	8,644	-3.58
SNP	9	4	1	+3	26.47	20.75	7,723	+1.95
Independent	7	3	1	+2	20.59	22.71	8,454	-1.61
Liberal Democrats	6	0	4	-4	17.65	16.49	6,138	-8.11
Borders	2	0	0	0	5.88	10.09	3,755	+4.79
Labour	0	-	-	-	-	6.31	2,347	+4.41
Green	0	-	-	-	-	0.44	161	-0.46

Note: "Votes" are the first preference votes. The net gain/loss and percentage changes relate to the result of the previous Scottish local elections on 3 May 2007. This may differ from other published sources showing gain/loss relative to seats held at dissolution of Scotland's councils.

== Ward results ==
=== Tweeddale West ===
- 2007: 1xLib Dem; 1xCon; 1xSNP
- 2012: 1xLib Dem; 1xCon; 1xSNP
- 2007-2012 Change: No change

Tweeddale West - 3 seats
Party	Candidate	FPv%	Count				
Party	Candidate	FPv%	1	2	3	4	5
Liberal Democrats	Catriona Bhatia (incumbent)	25.62	919				
Conservative	Nathaniel Buckingham††	24.67	885	887.4	978.6		
SNP	Willie Archibald (incumbent)	21.75	780	782.1	833.4	839.6	934.3
Labour	Julia Reid	9.37	336	337.2	389.3	393.1	
Liberal Democrats	Nancy Norman	9.31	334	347.9	415.5	449.4	548.9
Borders	David Pye	9.28	333	334.4			
Electorate: 7,577 Valid: 3,587 Spoilt: 34 Quota: 897 Turnout: 3,621 (47.34%)

=== Tweeddale East ===
- 2007: 1xSNP; 1xLib Dem; 1xCon
- 2012: 1xSNP; 1xCon; 1xLib Dem
- 2007-2012 Change: No change

Tweeddale East
Party	Candidate	FPv%	Count					
Party	Candidate	FPv%	1	2	3	4	5	6
SNP	Stuart Bell	26.41	990					
Conservative	Gavin Logan (incumbent)	24.78	929	934.4	971.8			
Liberal Democrats	Graham Garvie (incumbent)	16.38	614	622.3	674.5	686.7	811.9	1,087.9
Labour	Robin Tatler	15.23	571	579.6	629.9	631.2	731.2	
Borders	Frances Pringle	9.20	345	352.9	439	448.7		
Independent	David Cox	8.00	300	307.1				
Electorate: 8,106 Valid: 3,749 Spoilt: 32 Quota: 938 Turnout: 3,781 (46.25%)

=== Galashiels and District ===
- 2007: 1xSNP; 1xLib Dem; 1xCon; 1xBP
- 2012: 2xSNP; 1xBP; 1xIndependent
- 2007-2012 Change: SNP and Independent gain one seat from Lib Dem and Con

Galashiels and District - 4 seats
Party	Candidate	FPv%	Count					
Party	Candidate	FPv%	1	2	3	4	5	6
Borders	Sandy Aitchison (incumbent)	22.45	822					
SNP	Bill Herd *	20.95	766					
Independent	Bill White	13.69	501	522.9	524.6	590.6	701	894.8
SNP	John Mitchell (incumbent)	13.45	492	506	532.5	593.5	639.9	762
Liberal Democrats	Rick Kenney	11.40	417	432.9	434.8	490.3	609.4	
Conservative	Fiona Lackenby (incumbent)	10.56	386	402.5	403.2	409.6		
Labour	Robbie Tatler	7.47	273	280.8	281.7			
Electorate: 10,813 Valid: 3,657 Spoilt: 69 Quota: 732 Turnout: 3,726 (33.82%)

- = Outgoing Councillor from a different Ward.

=== Selkirkshire ===
- 2007: 1xLib Dem; 1xCon; 1xSNP
- 2012: 1xCon; 1xLib Dem; 1xIndependent
- 2007-2012 Change: Independent gain one seat from SNP

Selkirkshire - 3 seats
Party	Candidate	FPv%	Count				
Party	Candidate	FPv%	1	2	3	4	5
Conservative	Michelle Ballantyne	24.28	799	832			
SNP	Kenneth Gunn (incumbent)	20.39	671	696	696.8	744.9	
Liberal Democrats	Vicky Davidson (incumbent)	19.72	649	708	710.8	821.4	1,042.6
Independent	Gordon Edgar	18.14	597	673	674.1	762.4	983.5
Borders	Leven Brown	9.09	299	340	341.7		
Independent	Gordon Harrison	8.39	276				
Electorate: 7,714 Valid: 3,291 Spoilt: 36 Quota: 823 Turnout: 3,327 (42.66%)

=== Leaderdale and Melrose ===
- 2007: 1xIndependent; 1xLib Dem; 1xBP
- 2012: 1xIndependent; 1xBP; 1xSNP
- 2007-2012 Change: SNP gain one seat from Lib Dem

Leaderdale and Melrose - 3 seats
Party	Candidate	FPv%	Count					
Party	Candidate	FPv%	1	2	3	4	5	6
Independent	David Parker (incumbent)	36.34	1,304					
Borders	Nicholas Watson (incumbent)†	17.31	621	705.9	758.9	929.6		
SNP	Jim Torrance††††	15.55	558	632.4	706.8	742.6	747.6	969.6
Conservative	Peter Duncan	12.29	441	488.3	500.2			
Liberal Democrats	John Paton-Day (incumbent)	12.24	439	527.1	568.3	715.8	726.8	
Labour	Agnes Craig	6.27	225	258.6				
Electorate: 8,292 Valid: 3,588 Spoilt: 21 Quota: 898 Turnout: 3,609 (43.27%)

=== Mid Berwickshire ===
- 2007: 1xLib Dem; 1xSNP; 1xCon
- 2012: 1xSNP; 1xCon; 1xLib Dem
- 2007-2012 Change: No change

Mid Berwickshire - 3 seats
Party	Candidate	FPv%	Count				
Party	Candidate	FPv%	1	2	3	4	5
SNP	Donald Moffat (incumbent)	31.97	1,133				
Conservative	John Greenwell	21.46	747	768.9	1,085.9		
Liberal Democrats	Frances Renton (incumbent)	18.24	635	703.3	753.9	804.6	1,110.9
Borders	Tom Miers	15.34	534	598.5	635.3	688.3	
Conservative	Trevor Jones (incumbent)	12.41	432	446.6			
Electorate: 8,209 Valid: 3,481 Spoilt: 43 Quota: 871 Turnout: 3,524 (42.4%)

=== East Berwickshire ===
- 2007: 1xIndependent; 1xCon; 1xLib Dem
- 2012: 1xIndependent; 1xCon; 1xSNP
- 2007-2012 Change: SNP gain one seat from Lib Dem

East Berwickshire - 3 seats
Party	Candidate	FPv%	Count						
Party	Candidate	FPv%	1	2	3	4	5	6	7
Independent	Michael Cook (incumbent)	35.96	1,236						
Conservative	Jim Fullarton (incumbent)	21.24	730	835.9	875.4				
SNP	Joan Umpherston Campbell	15.74	541	583.3	600.9	602.2	629.5	699	906.9
Labour	Kenryck Lloyd-Jones	12.66	435	472.1	485.9	486.6	521.9	596.9	
Liberal Democrats	Ken Webb	6.58	226	263.1	285.9	289.5	329		
Independent	Jack Johnston	3.96	136	192.9	226.9	229.7			
Borders	Cat MacDonald-Home	3.87	133	161.6					
Electorate: 8,383 Valid: 3,437 Spoilt: 37 Quota: 860 Turnout: 3,474 (41%)

=== Kelso and District ===
- 2007: 1xLib Dem; 1xCon; 1xIndependent
- 2012: 2xCon; 1xLib Dem
- 2007-2012 Change: Con gain from Independent

Kelso and District - 3 seats
Party	Candidate	FPv%	Count							
Party	Candidate	FPv%	1	2	3	4	5	6	7	8
Conservative	Tom Weatherston (incumbent)	23.98	777	777	794	824				
Liberal Democrats	Alec Nicol (incumbent)	22.5	729	756	791	832				
Conservative	Simon Mountford	14.29	463	471	482	518	522.6	529.2	610.1	703.7
SNP	Maggie Stanfield	12.75	413	444	462	507	510.5	511.6	590.1	
Independent	Yvonne Huggins-Haig	10.0	324	331	365	435	438.7	440.2		
Borders	Diana Miers	7.81	253	269	306					
Independent	Colin McGrath	5.09	165	176						
Green	Michael Scott	3.58	116							
Electorate: 8,242 Valid: 3,240 Spoilt: 24 Quota: 811 Turnout: 3,264 (39.31%)

=== Jedburgh and District ===
- 2007: 2xCon; 1xSNP
- 2012: 1xSNP; 1xCon; 1xIndependent
- 2007-2012 Change: Independent gain one seat from Con

Jedburgh and District - 3 seats
Party	Candidate	FPv%	Count						
Party	Candidate	FPv%	1	2	3	4	5	6	7
SNP	Jim Brown (incumbent)	23.44	759	793	837				
Conservative	Sandy Scott (incumbent)	21.68	702	704	769	771.1	948.5		
Independent	Rory Stewart	16.95	549	580	642	650.2	781.1	801.9	1,050.6
Conservative	Len Wyse (incumbent)	12.75	413	417	430	432.5			
Liberal Democrats	John Bathgate	11.98	388	409	459	464.7	539	567.4	
Borders	Trevor Jackson	7.97	258	292					
Labour	David Robert Scott Sharp	5.22	169						
Electorate: 8,242 Valid: 3,238 Spoilt: 45 Quota: 810 Turnout: 3,283 (45.24%)

=== Hawick and Denholm ===
- 2007: 1xCon; 1xIndependent; 1xLib Dem
- 2012: 1xIndependent; 1xCon; 1xSNP
- 2007-2012 Change: SNP gain one seat from Lib Dem

Hawick and Denholm - 3 seats
Party	Candidate	FPv%	Count					
Party	Candidate	FPv%	1	2	3	4	5	6
Independent	Stuart Marshall (incumbent)	56.72	1,734					
Conservative	Zandra Elliott (incumbent)†††	13.97	427	580.1	589.3	618.2	633.2	802.3
SNP	Alastair Cranston	12.46	381	506.2	523.9	539.3	593.1	749.9
Liberal Democrats	Watson McAteer	8.60	263	482.6	493.8	507.2	542.3	
Labour	Michael A Grieve	4.81	147	191.1	205.9	215.2		
Borders	Mary Douglas	2.45	75	96.8	105.8			
Independent	Craig Bryson	0.98	30	88.1				
Electorate: 7,183 Valid: 3,057 Spoilt: 34 Quota: 765 Turnout: 3,091 (42.56%)

=== Hawick and Hermitage ===
- 2007: 1xIndependent; 1xCon; 1xLib Dem
- 2012: 1xIndependent; 1xLib Dem; 1xCon
- 2007-2012 Change: No change

Hawick and Hermitage - 3 seats
Party	Candidate	FPv%	Count						
Party	Candidate	FPv%	1	2	3	4	5	6	7
Independent	Davie Paterson (incumbent)	44.93	1,302						
Liberal Democrats	Ron Smith (incumbent)	18.12	525	676.1	687.7	706.4	785.2		
Conservative	George Turnbull (incumbent)	17.70	513	614	616.5	641.2	657.6	686.3	779.9
SNP	Tommy Stevenson	8.25	239	300.2	309.5	323.9	368.9	377.2	
Labour	Bill Cumming	6.59	191	246.8	258.4	270.3			
Borders	Frank Little	2.83	82	115.2	124.8				
Green	Kevin Ferguson	1.59	46	65.5					
Electorate: 7,041 Valid: 2,898 Spoilt: 34 Quota: 725 Turnout: 2,932 (41.16%)

== Post Election Changes ==
- † On 4 February 2012 Leaderdale and Melrose Borders Party Cllr Nicholas Watson resigned his seat on the Council to pursue employment in Cumbria. The by-election was won by Iain Gillespie, also of the Borders Party, on 2 May 2013. Borders Party's Iain Gillespie wins Leaderdale and Melrose by-election
- †† On 29 July 2013 Tweedale West Conservative and Unionist Party Cllr Nathaniel Buckingham resigned his seat on the Council due to work pressures and family commitments. The by-election was held on 10 October 2013 and was held by the Conservatives Keith Cockburn. Tweeddale West by-election result 2013 - Scottish Borders Council
- ††† On 22 February 2014 Hawick and Denholm Conservative and Unionist Cllr Zandra Elliot died.Hawick 'ambassador' Zandra Elliot dies A by-election was held to fill the vacancy and was won by the Independent Watson McAteer.
- †††† On 2 June 2016 Leaderdale and Melrose SNP Cllr Jim Torrance resigned from the party and became an Independent citing lack of support from Christine Grahame MSP over the Council's plans to house the Great Tapestry of Scotland at Tweedbank.SBC Councillor quits over tapestry

== By-elections since 2012 ==
Leaderdale and Melrose By-election (2 May 2013) - 1 Seat
Party	Candidate	FPv%	Count					
Party	Candidate	FPv%	1	2	3	4	5	6
Conservative	Rachael Hamilton	27.57	956	975	982	1,038	1,283	
Borders	Iain Gillespie	23.48	814	844	900	1,118	1,444	2,066
Liberal Democrats	John Paton-Day	21.46	744	756	816	983		
SNP	Harry Cummings	17.68	613	623	666			
Labour	Robin Tatler	6.78	235	238				
UKIP	Sherry Fowler	3.03	105					
Electorate: 8,386 Valid: 3,467 Spoilt: 20 Quota: 1,734 Turnout: 3,487 (41.58%)

Tweeddale West By-election (10 October 2013) - 1 Seat
Party	Candidate	FPv%	Count						
Party	Candidate	FPv%	1	2	3	4	5	6	7
Conservative	Keith Cockburn	42.65	1,155	1,165	1,176	1,193	1,255	1,288	1,616
Liberal Democrats	Nancy Norman	25.0	677	682	690	759	858	1,034	
SNP	Morag Kerr	13.26	359	369	373	409	444		
Borders	David Pye	8.4	228	237	245	272			
Labour	Veronica McTernan	7.5	203	204	207				
UKIP	Mars Goodman	1.56	43	44					
Independent	David Cox	1.56	43						
Electorate: 7,707 Valid: 2,708 Spoilt: 21 Quota: 1,355 Turnout: 2,729 (35.41%)

Hawick and Denholm By-election (22 May 2014) - 1 Seat
Party	Candidate	FPv%	Count						
Party	Candidate	FPv%	1	2	3	4	5	6	7
Independent	Watson McAteer	25.5	732	750	803	900	1,010	1,222	1,505
Conservative	Trevor Adams	21.6	622	627	638	665	692	798	
Liberal Democrats	Ian Turnbull	15.7	450	455	485	545	637		
SNP	Harry Stoddart	14.6	419	423	461	505			
Independent	Marion Short	11.3	326	334	385				
Independent	Davie Paterson	8.7	250	269					
Independent	Craig Bryson	2.6	74						
Valid: 2,873 Spoilt: 47 Quota: 1,437 Turnout: 2,920 (%)
