= 2007 Scottish Borders Council election =

2007 Scottish local government election

- 3 May 2007

All 34 seats to Scottish Borders Council 18 seats needed for a majority
	First party	Second party	Third party
Party	Conservative	Liberal Democrats	SNP
Last election	10 seats, 30.4%	9 seats, 26.3%	1 seat, 11.5%
Seats before	10	9	1
Seats won	11	10	6
Seat change	▲1	▲1	▲5
Popular vote	13,083	11,980	9,161
Percentage	26.8%	24.6%	18.8%
Swing	▼1.8%	▼1.7%	▲7.3%
	Fourth party	Fifth party
Party	Independent	Borders
Last election	14 seats, 30.4%	New Party
Seats before	14	N/A
Seats won	5	2
Seat change	▼8	▲2
Popular vote	10,272	2,597
Percentage	21.1%	5.3%
Swing	▼9.3%	New
Council Leader before election
David Parker
Independent
Council Leader after election
David Parker
Independent

Elections to Scottish Borders Council were held on 3 May 2007, the same day as the other Scottish local government elections and the Scottish Parliament general election. The election was the first one using 11 new wards created as a result of the Local Governance (Scotland) Act 2004, each ward will elect three or four councillors using the single transferable vote system form of proportional representation. The new wards replace 34 single-member wards which used the plurality (first past the post) system of election.

== Election results ==
Scottish Borders local election result 2007
Party	Seats	Gains	Losses	Net gain/loss	Seats %	Votes %	Votes	+/−
Conservative	11	N/A	N/A	±0	32.4	26.8	13,083	▼1.8
Liberal Democrats	10	N/A	N/A	+2	29.4	24.6	11,980	▼1.7
SNP	6	N/A	N/A	+4	17.6	18.8	9,161	▲7.3
Independent	5	N/A	N/A	-8	14.7	21.1	10,272	▼9.3
Borders	2	N/A	N/A	+2	5.9	5.3	2,597	New
Labour	0	N/A	N/A	±0	0.0	1.9	919	▲0.5
Green	0	N/A	N/A	±0	0.0	0.9	456	New
Solidarity	0	N/A	N/A	±0	0.0	0.4	210	New
Scottish Socialist	0	N/A	N/A	±0	0.0	0.2	105	▼1.7

== Ward results ==
Scottish Borders council election, 2007: Tweeddale West
Party	Candidate	FPv%	%	Seat	Count
Liberal Democrats	Catriona Bhatia	1,202	25.2	1	1
Conservative	Neil Calvert	1,091	22.9	2	4
SNP	Willie Archibald	784	16.4	3	5
Independent	Nancy Norman	672	14.1		
Independent	Tom Davidson	667	14.0		
Labour	Eamonn O'Neil	356	7.5		

Scottish Borders council election, 2007: Tweeddale East
Party	Candidate	FPv%	%	Seat	Count
SNP	Bill Herd	1,167	24.3	1	3
Liberal Democrats	Graham Garvie	1,159	24.1	2	3
Conservative	Gavin Logan	1,086	22.6	3	4
Labour	Robin Tatler	563	11.7		
Liberal Democrats	Bran McCrow	490	10.2		
Borders	Tom Douglas	231	4.8		
Scottish Socialist	Norman Lockhart	105	2.2		

Scottish Borders council election, 2007: Galashiels and District
Party	Candidate	FPv%	%	Seat	Count
SNP	John Mitchell	1,519	28.2	1	1
Liberal Democrats	Jim Hume	1,466	27.2	2	1
Conservative	Fiona Lackenby	735	13.6	4	6
Borders	Sandy Aitchison	693	12.9	3	6
Independent	Bill White	453	8.4		
Solidarity	Graeme McIver	210	3.9		
Independent	David Smail	173	3.2		
Independent	Alistair Lings	136	2.5		

Scottish Borders council election, 2007: Selkirkshire
Party	Candidate	FPv%	%	Seat	Count
Liberal Democrats	Vicky Davidson	1,313	29.5	1	1
Conservative	Carolyn Riddell-Carre	1,121	25.2	2	1
SNP	Kenneth Gunn	826	18.5	3	5
Independent	Gordon Edgar	558	12.5		
Borders	Violet Baillie	360	8.1		
Independent	Alistair Pattullo	279	6.3		

Scottish Borders council election, 2007: Leaderdale and Melrose
Party	Candidate	FPv%	%	Seat	Count
Independent	David Parker	1,362	29.9	1	1
Conservative	John Greenwell	713	15.6		
Liberal Democrats	John Paton-Day	703	15.3	2	5
Borders	Nicholas Watson	692	15.1	3	5
SNP	Frank McCann	640	14.0		
Independent	Harry Cummings	394	8.6		
Independent	John Rae	78	1.7		

Scottish Borders council election, 2007: Mid Berwickshire
Party	Candidate	FPv%	%	Seat	Count
Liberal Democrats	Frances Renton	1,186	27.0	1	1
SNP	Donald Moffat	1,173	26.7	2	1
Conservative	Trevor Jones	1,051	23.9	3	4
Conservative	Margaret McCrave	722	16.4		
Borders	Diana Miers	255	5.8		
Independent	Anne Roberts	105	2.4		

Scottish Borders council election, 2007: East Berwickshire
Party	Candidate	FPv%	%	Seat	Count
Independent	Michael Cook	1,512	34.8	1	1
Conservative	Jim Fullarton	1,333	30.6	2	1
Liberal Democrats	David Raw	804	18.5	3	3
SNP	Aileen Orr	701	16.1		

Scottish Borders council election, 2007: Kelso and District
Party	Candidate	FPv%	%	Seat	Count
Liberal Democrats	Alec Nicol	1,116	25.7	1	1
Conservative	Alasdair Hutton	982	22.7	2	5
Independent	Tom Weatherston†	814	18.8	3	5
Independent	Trevor Black	431	9.9		
Conservative	Andrew Thomson	427	9.9		
SNP	Paul Cartledge	346	8.0		
Green	Michael Scott	218	5.0		

Scottish Borders council election, 2007: Jedburgh and District
Party	Candidate	FPv%	%	Seat	Count
Conservative	Sandy Scott	1,011	26.0	1	1
Conservative	Len Wyse	878	22.6	2	4
SNP	Jim Brown	877	22.6	3	4
Liberal Democrats	Alistair O'Neil	716	18.4		
Borders	Jim Smith	316	8.1		
Independent	Jim Millhouse	87	2.2		

Scottish Borders council election, 2007: Hawick and Denholm
Party	Candidate	FPv%	%	Seat	Count
Conservative	Zandra Elliott	980	26.0	1	1
Independent	Stewart Marshall	904	24.0	2	5
Liberal Democrats	Jock Houston	738	19.6	3	5
SNP	Derek Philips	454	12.0		
Independent	Andrew Farquhar	301	8.0		
Liberal Democrats	Alex Martin	232	6.2		
Green	Kevin Ferguson	112	3.0		
Borders	Charles Humphries	50	1.3		

Scottish Borders council election, 2007: Hawick and Hermitage
Party	Candidate	FPv%	%	Seat	Count
Independent	David Paterson	1,022	25.8	1	1
Conservative	George Turnbull	953	24.1	2	4
SNP	Jim Rowan	674	17.0		
Liberal Democrats	Ron Smith	475	12.0	3	6
Liberal Democrats	Etta McKean	380	9.6		
Independent	Jake Irvine	324	8.2		
Green	Lesley Wood	126	3.2		

== Changes after the elections ==
- †Tom Weatherston ceased to be an Independent and joined the Conservatives on 17 January 2011
