= List of Conservative members of the Scottish Parliament =

This is a list of Scottish Conservative MSPs. It includes all members of the Scottish Parliament (MSPs) who represented the Scottish Conservatives in the Scottish Parliament.

== List of MSPs ==
| Name | Constituency or region | Type | Start year | End year | Reason |
|---|---|---|---|---|---|
| Bill Aitken | Glasgow | Region | 1999 | 2011 | Retired |
| Jeremy Balfour | Lothian | Region | 2016 | 2025 | Resigned from Conservatives |
| Michelle Ballantyne | South Scotland | Region | 2017 | 2020 | Resigned from Conservatives |
| Bill Bowman | North East Scotland | Region | 2016 | 2021 | Retired |
| Miles Briggs | Lothian | Region | 2016 | 2026 | Region abolished |
| Miles Briggs | Edinburgh and Lothians East | Region | 2026 | | Serving |
| Ted Brocklebank | Mid Scotland and Fife | Region | 2003 | 2011 | Retired |
| Gavin Brown | Lothians | Region | 2007 | 2011 | Region abolished |
| Gavin Brown | Lothian | Region | 2011 | 2016 | Retired |
| Derek Brownlee | South of Scotland | Region | 2005 | 2011 | Defeated |
| Cameron Buchanan | Lothian | Region | 2013 | 2016 | Retired |
| Alexander Burnett | Aberdeenshire West | Constituency | 2016 | | Serving |
| Donald Cameron | Highlands and Islands | Region | 2016 | 2024 | Resigned |
| Jackson Carlaw | West of Scotland | Region | 2007 | 2011 | Region abolished |
| Jackson Carlaw | West Scotland | Region | 2011 | 2016 | Elected for constituency |
| Jackson Carlaw | Eastwood | Constituency | 2016 | 2026 | Defeated |
| Finlay Carson | Galloway and West Dumfries | Constituency | 2016 | | Serving |
| Peter Chapman | North East Scotland | Constituency | 2016 | 2021 | Retired |
| Maurice Corry | West Scotland | Region | 2016 | 2021 | Defeated |
| David Davidson | North East Scotland | Region | 1999 | 2007 | Defeated |
| Ruth Davidson | Glasgow | Region | 2011 | 2016 | Elected for constituency |
| Ruth Davidson | Edinburgh Central | Constituency | 2016 | 2021 | Retired |
| James Douglas-Hamilton | Lothians | Region | 1999 | 2007 | Retired |
| Sharon Dowey | South Scotland | Region | 2021 | 2026 | Defeated |
| Tim Eagle | Highlands and Islands | Region | 2024 | | Serving |
| Alex Fergusson (Note: Alex Fergusson served as Presiding Officer of the Scottish Parliament from 2007 to 2011. As is customary, he suspended his Conservative party membership for that period.) | South of Scotland | Region | 1999 | 2003 | Elected for constituency |
| Alex Fergusson | Galloway and Upper Nithsdale | Constituency | 2003 | 2011 | Constituency abolished |
| Alex Fergusson | Galloway and West Dumfries | Constituency | 2011 | 2016 | Retired |
| Russell Findlay | West Scotland | Region | 2021 | | Serving |
| Murdo Fraser | Mid Scotland and Fife | Region | 2001 | | Serving |
| Meghan Gallacher | Central Scotland | Region | 2021 | 2026 | Region abolished |
| Meghan Gallacher | Central Scotland and Lothians West | Region | 2026 | | Serving |
| Phil Gallie | South of Scotland | Region | 1999 | 2007 | Retired |
| Maurice Golden | West Scotland | Region | 2016 | 2021 | Elected for another region |
| Maurice Golden | North East Scotland | Region | 2021 | 2026 | Retired |
| Annabel Goldie | West of Scotland | Region | 1999 | 2011 | Region abolished |
| Annabel Goldie | West Scotland | Region | 2011 | 2016 | Retired |
| Pam Gosal | West Scotland | Region | 2021 | 2026 | Defeated |
| Jamie Greene | West Scotland | Region | 2016 | 2025 | Left the Conservatives |
| Sandesh Gulhane | Glasgow | Region | 2021 | 2026 | Defeated |
| Jamie Halcro Johnston | Highlands and Islands | Region | 2017 | 2026 | Defeated |
| Rachael Hamilton | South Scotland | Constituency | 2016 | 2017 | Resigned |
| Rachael Hamilton | Ettrick, Roxburgh and Berwickshire | Constituency | 2017 | | Serving |
| Keith Harding | Mid Scotland and Fife | Region | 1999 | 2003 | Defeated |
| Alison Harris | Central Scotland | Region | 2016 | 2021 | Retired |
| Craig Hoy | South Scotland | Region | 2021 | 2026 | Elected for constituency |
| Craig Hoy | Dumfriesshire | Constituency | 2026 | | Serving |
| Nick Johnston | Mid Scotland and Fife | Region | 1999 | 2001 | Resigned |
| Alex Johnstone | North East Scotland | Region | 1999 | 2016 | Died |
| Liam Kerr | North East Scotland | Region | 2016 | | Serving |
| Stephen Kerr | Central Scotland | Region | 2021 | 2026 | Region abolished |
| Stephen Kerr | Mid Scotland and Fife | Region | 2026 | | Serving |
| John Lamont | Roxburgh and Berwickshire | Constituency | 2007 | 2011 | Constituency abolished |
| John Lamont | Ettrick, Roxburgh and Berwickshire | Constituency | 2011 | 2017 | Resigned |
| Gordon Lindhurst | Lothian | Region | 2016 | 2021 | Defeated |
| Dean Lockhart | Mid Scotland and Fife | Region | 2016 | 2022 | Resigned |
| Douglas Lumsden | North East Scotland | Region | 2021 | | Serving |
| Tom Mason | North East Scotland | Region | 2017 | 2021 | Retired |
| Roz McCall | Mid Scotland and Fife | Region | 2022 | 2026 | Defeated |
| Jamie McGrigor | Highlands and Islands | Region | 1999 | 2016 | Retired |
| Lyndsay McIntosh | Central Scotland | Region | 1999 | 2003 | Defeated |
| David McLetchie | Lothians | Region | 1999 | 2003 | Elected for constituency |
| David McLetchie | Edinburgh Pentlands | Constituency | 2003 | 2011 | Defeated |
| David McLetchie | Lothian | Region | 2011 | 2013 | Died |
| Nanette Milne | North East Scotland | Region | 2003 | 2016 | Retired |
| Margaret Mitchell | Central Scotland | Region | 2003 | 2021 | Retired |
| Brian Monteith | Mid Scotland and Fife | Region | 1999 | 2005 | Left the Conservatives |
| Edward Mountain | Highlands and Islands | Region | 2016 | 2026 | Retired |
| David Mundell | South of Scotland | Region | 1999 | 2005 | Resigned |
| Oliver Mundell | Dumfriesshire | Constituency | 2016 | 2026 | Retired |
| Dave Petrie | Highlands and Islands | Region | 2006 | 2007 | Defeated |
| Douglas Ross | Highlands and Islands | Region | 2016 | 2017 | Resigned |
| Douglas Ross | Highlands and Islands | Region | 2021 | 2026 | Retired |
| Mary Scanlon | Highlands and Islands | Region | 1999 | 2016 | Retired |
| John Scott | Ayr | Constituency | 2000 | 2021 | Defeated |
| Graham Simpson | Central Scotland | Region | 2016 | 2025 | Defected to Reform UK |
| Liz Smith | Mid Scotland and Fife | Region | 2007 | 2026 | Retired |
| Alexander Stewart | Mid Scotland and Fife | Region | 2016 | 2026 | Defeated |
| Ross Thomson | North East Scotland | Region | 2016 | 2017 | Resigned |
| Adam Tomkins | Glasgow | Region | 2016 | 2021 | Retired |
| Murray Tosh | South of Scotland | Region | 1999 | 2003 | Switched region |
| Murray Tosh | West of Scotland | Region | 2003 | 2007 | Defeated |
| Ben Wallace | North East Scotland | Region | 1999 | 2003 | Retired |
| Sue Webber | Lothian | Region | 2021 | 2026 | Defeated |
| Annie Wells | Glasgow | Region | 2016 | 2026 | Defeated |
| Tess White | North East Scotland | Region | 2021 | 2026 | Defeated |
| Brian Whittle | South Scotland | Region | 2016 | 2026 | Defeated |
| John Young | West of Scotland | Region | 1999 | 2003 | Retired |
