= Ettrick, Roxburgh and Berwickshire =

Region or constituency of the Scottish Parliament

- County constituency for the Scottish Parliament
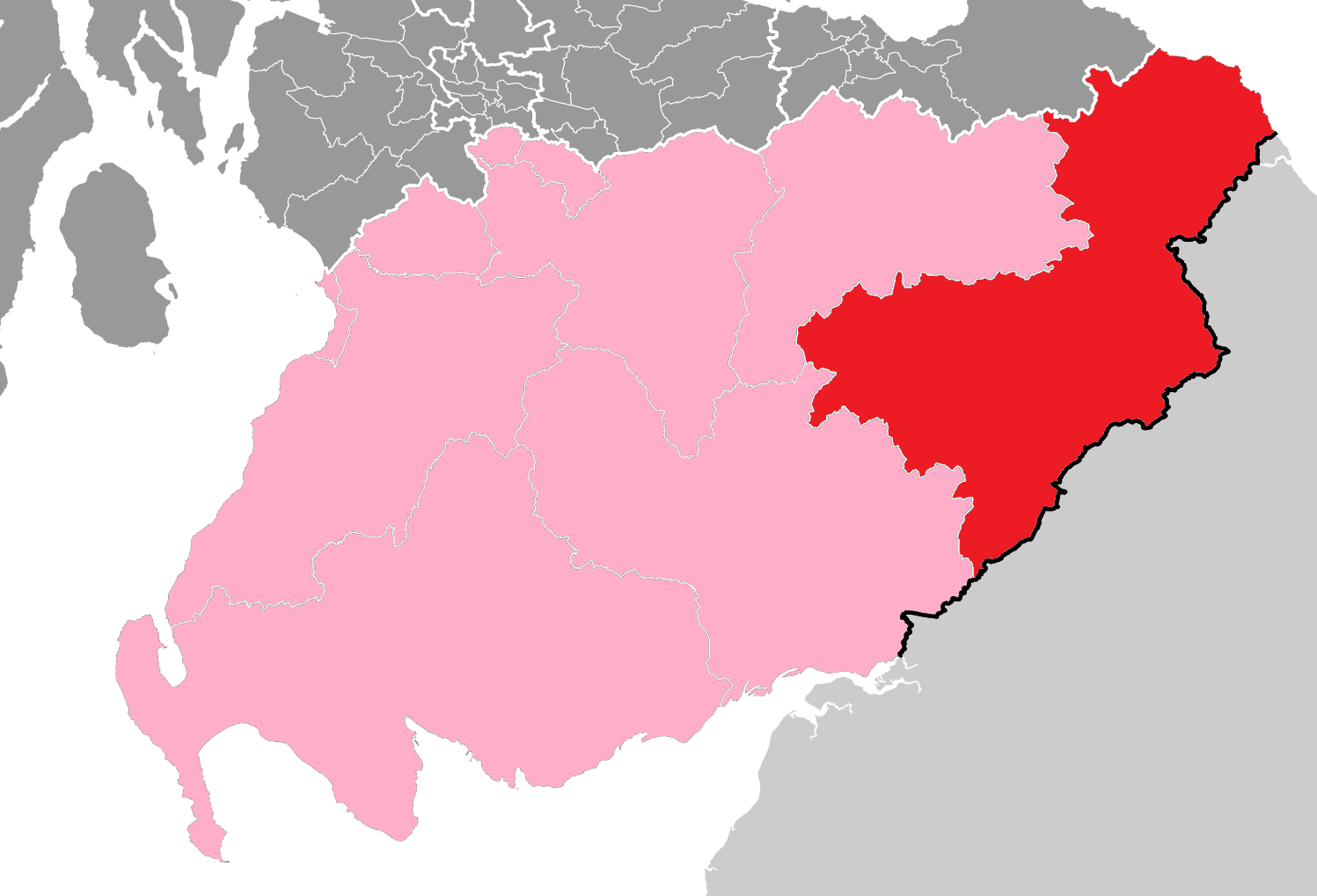

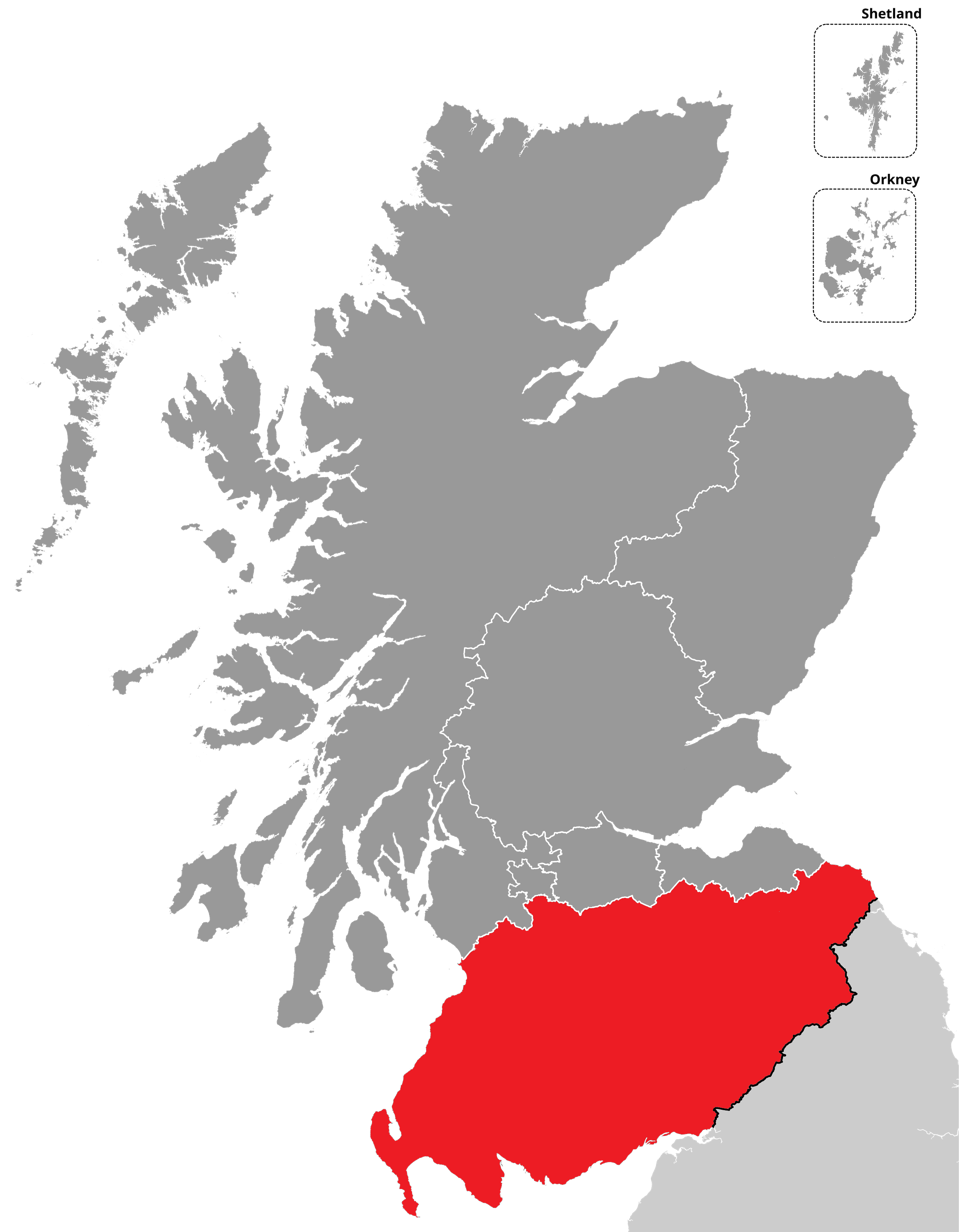
- Ettrick, Roxburgh and Berwickshire shown within the South Scotland electoral region, and the region shown within Scotland
- Electoral region: South Scotland
- Electorate: 57,044 (2026)

Current constituency
- Created: 2011
- Party: Conservative
- MSP: Rachael Hamilton
- Council area: Scottish Borders
- Created from: Roxburgh and Berwickshire, Tweeddale, Ettrick and Lauderdale

Ettrick, Roxburgh and Berwickshire (Gaelic: Eadraig, Rosbrog agus Siorrachd Bhearaig) is a county constituency of the Scottish Parliament covering part of the council area of Scottish Borders. Under the additional-member electoral system used for elections to the Scottish Parliament, it elects one Member of the Scottish Parliament (MSP) by the first past the post method of election. It is also one of ten constituencies in the South Scotland electoral region, which elects seven additional members, in addition to the ten constituency MSPs, to produce a form of proportional representation for the region as a whole.

The constituency was established for the 2011 Scottish Parliament election, and covers parts of the former constituencies of Tweeddale, Ettrick and Lauderdale and Roxburgh and Berwickshire. The remaining parts of the Scottish Borders form part of the Midlothian South, Tweeddale and Lauderdale constituency. The boundaries of the constituency remained unchanged following the Second Periodic Review of Scottish Parliament Boundaries undertaken by Boundaries Scotland ahead of the 2026 Scottish Parliament election.

Ettrick, Roxburgh and Berwickshire is currently held by the Conservatives. The current MSP is Rachael Hamilton, who won the seat at a 2017 by-election following the resignation of previous member John Lamont in order to contest the 2017 UK general election.

== Electoral region ==
Following the second periodic review of Scottish Parliament boundaries in 2025, the other nine constituencies of the South Scotland region are: Ayr; Carrick, Cumnock and Doon Valley; Clydesdale; Dumfriesshire; East Kilbride; Galloway and West Dumfries; Hamilton, Larkhall and Stonehouse; Kilmarnock and Irvine Valley; and Midlothian South, Tweeddale and Lauderdale. The region covers the whole of the council areas of Dumfries and Galloway, Scottish Borders, and South Ayrshire council areas; and parts of the council areas of East Ayrshire, Midlothian, and South Lanarkshire. By population it is now the largest of Scotland's eight electoral regions.

Prior to the 2025 review, there were nine constituencies in the South Scotland region. Besides Ettrick, Roxburgh and Berwickshire, the other eight constituencies were: Ayr; Carrick, Cumnock and Doon Valley; Dumfriesshire; East Lothian; Clydesdale; Galloway and West Dumfries; Kilmarnock and Irvine Valley; and Midlothian South, Tweeddale and Lauderdale. The region covered the Dumfries and Galloway, East Ayrshire, Scottish Borders and South Ayrshire council areas in full and parts of the East Lothian, Midlothian and South Lanarkshire council areas.

== Constituency boundaries and council areas ==
Map of boundaries from 2011

The rest of the Scottish Borders is represented in the Scottish Parliament by the Midlothian South, Tweeddale and Lauderdale constituency. The electoral wards of Scottish Borders Council used in the current creation of Ettrick, Roxburgh and Berwickshire are:

- Selkirkshire
- Mid Berwickshire
- East Berwickshire
- Kelso and District
- Jedburgh and District
- Hawick and Denholm
- Hawick and Hermitage

== Members of the Scottish Parliament ==
Election	Member	Party
2011	John Lamont	Conservative
2017 by-election	Rachael Hamilton	Conservative

== Election results ==
=== 2026 parliamentary election ===
2026 Scottish Parliament election: Ettrick, Roxburgh and Berwickshire
Party	Candidate	Constituency			Regional		
Party	Candidate	Votes	%	±%	Votes	%	±%
Conservative	Rachael Hamilton (Note: Incumbent member for this constituency)	13,483	44.8	▼6.7	11,405	37.8	▼9.6
SNP	John Redpath	8,206	27.3	▼5.2	6,403	21.2	▼8.9
Reform	Jamie Langan (Note: Elected on the party list)	3,569	11.9	New	4,449	14.8	▲14.5
Liberal Democrats	Ray Georgeson	2,358	7.8	▲1.3	2,596	8.6	▲1.9
Green					2,403	8.0	▲3.4
Labour	Kaymarie Hughes	1,577	5.2	▼0.5	1,854	6.2	▼0.6
Independent	James Anderson	740	2.5	New			
Independent Green Voice					272	0.9	▲0.5
AtLS	Terry Howson	165	0.5	New	242	0.8	New
Scottish Family					218	0.7	▲0.2
Independent	Denise Sommerville				54	0.2	New
Scottish Socialist					49	0.2	New
UKIP					48	0.2	0.0
Independent	Sean Davies				47	0.2	New
Heritage					31	0.1	New
Scottish Libertarian					29	0.1	▼0.1
ADF					23	0.08	New
Scottish Common Party					23	0.08	New
Majority		5,277	17.5	▼1.5			
Valid votes		30,098			30,146		
Invalid votes		109			98		
Turnout		30,207	52.8	▼11.1	30,244	53.0	▼11.0
Conservative hold		Swing					

=== 2021 parliamentary election ===
2021 Scottish Parliament election: Ettrick, Roxburgh and Berwickshire (Note: Showing changes from 2016 general election.)
Party	Candidate	Constituency			Regional		
Party	Candidate	Votes	%	±%	Votes	%	±%
Conservative	Rachael Hamilton (Note: Incumbent member for this constituency)	18,564	51.5	▼3.7	17,075	47.4	▲0.7
SNP	Paul Wheelhouse (Note: Incumbent member on the party list, or for another constituency)	11,701	32.5	▲0.7	10,857	30.1	▼0.3
Liberal Democrats	Jenny Marr	2,352	6.5	▼1.2	2,426	6.7	▼1.9
Labour	Ian Davidson	2,050	5.7	▲0.4	2,438	6.8	0.0
Green	Barbra Harvie	1,084	3.0	New	1,665	4.6	▲0.1
All for Unity					492	1.4	New
Alba					317	0.9	New
Independent	Jesse Rae	290	0.8	New			
Scottish Family					184	0.51	New
Independent Green Voice					148	0.41	New
Abolish the Scottish Parliament					134	0.37	New
Reform					116	0.32	New
Scottish Libertarian					60	0.17	New
UKIP					60	0.17	▼2.1
Freedom Alliance (UK)					51	0.17	New
Vanguard					11	0.03	New
Scotia Future					10	0.03	New
Majority		6,863	19.0	▼4.4			
Valid votes		36,041			36,044		
Invalid votes		81			69		
Turnout		36,122	64.0	▲3.1	36,113	64.0	▲3.1
Conservative hold		Swing		▼2.2			

=== 2017 by-election ===
In April 2017, John Lamont announced his intention to resign his seat in the Scottish Parliament in order to contest the 2017 UK general election.

2017 Ettrick, Roxburgh and Berwickshire by-election
Party	Candidate	Votes	%	±%
Conservative	Rachael Hamilton	20,658	53.5	▼1.7
SNP	Gail Hendry	11,320	29.3	▼2.5
Labour	Sally Prentice	3,406	8.8	▲3.5
Liberal Democrats	Catriona Bhatia	3,196	8.3	▲0.6
Majority		9,338	24.2	▲0.8
Total valid votes		38,580		
Rejected ballots		73		
Turnout		38,653	70.9	▲10.0
Conservative hold		Swing	▲0.4	

=== 2016 parliamentary election ===
2016 Scottish Parliament election: Ettrick, Roxburgh and Berwickshire
Party	Candidate	Constituency			Regional		
Party	Candidate	Votes	%	±%	Votes	%	±%
Conservative	John Lamont (Note: Incumbent member for this constituency)	18,257	55.2	▲10.3	15,452	46.7	▲15.2
SNP	Paul Wheelhouse (Note: Incumbent member on the party list, or for another constituency)	10,521	31.8	▲5.4	10,068	30.4	▼4.4
Liberal Democrats	Jim Hume	2,551	7.7	▼9.6	2,851	8.6	▼6.2
Labour	Barrie Cunning	1,766	5.3	▼5.1	2,251	6.8	▼3.2
Green					1,481	4.5	▲1.1
UKIP					771	2.3	▲0.6
Clydesdale and South Scotland Independent					112	0.3	New
RISE					68	0.2	New
Solidarity					67	0.2	▲0.1
Majority		7,736	23.4	▲4.9			
Valid votes		33,095			33,121		
Invalid votes		88			68		
Turnout		33,183	60.9	▲7.7	33,189	60.9	▲7.7
Conservative hold		Swing					

=== 2011 parliamentary election ===
2011 Scottish Parliament election: Ettrick, Roxburgh and Berwickshire
Party	Candidate	Constituency			Regional		
Party	Candidate	Votes	%	±%	Votes	%	±%
Conservative	John Lamont (Note: Incumbent member for the Roxburgh and Berwickshire constituency)	12,933	44.88	N/A	9,045	31.5	N/A
SNP	Paul Wheelhouse (Note: Elected on the party list)	7,599	26.37	N/A	10,009	34.8	N/A
Liberal Democrats	Euan Robson	4,990	17.32	N/A	4,247	14.8	N/A
Labour	Rab Stewart	2,986	10.36	N/A	2,881	10.0	N/A
Green					965	3.4	N/A
UKIP					481	1.7	N/A
All-Scotland Pensioners Party					442	1.5	N/A
Independent	Jesse Rae	308	1.07	N/A			
Socialist Labour					201	0.7	N/A
BNP					183	0.6	N/A
Scottish Christian					178	0.6	N/A
Scottish Socialist					71	0.2	N/A
Solidarity					21	0.1	N/A
Majority		5,334	18.51	N/A			
Valid votes		28,816			28,724		
Invalid votes		102			166		
Turnout		28,918	53.2	N/A	28,890	53.2	N/A
Conservative win (new seat)							
