= Berwickshire, Roxburgh and Selkirk =

UK Parliament constituency (since 2005)

Coordinates: 55.776°N 2.411°W

- County constituency for the House of Commons
- Interactive map of current boundaries
- Boundary of Berwickshire, Roxburgh and Selkirk in Scotland
- Subdivisions of Scotland: Scottish Borders
- Electorate: 74,687 (March 2020)
- Major settlements: Galashiels, Hawick, Selkirk, Kelso, Eyemouth

Current constituency
- Created: 2005
- Member of Parliament: John Lamont (Conservative)
- Seats: One
- Created from: Tweeddale, Ettrick and Lauderdale, and Roxburgh and Berwickshire

Berwickshire, Roxburgh and Selkirk is a constituency of the British House of Commons, located in the south of Scotland within the Scottish Borders council area. It elects one Member of Parliament (MP) at least once every five years using the first-past-the-post system of voting. Since 2017 the MP has been John Lamont of the Conservative Party.

The constituency name comes from the three historic counties it covers: Berwickshire, Roxburghshire and Selkirkshire.

A mostly rural constituency, it includes the towns of Coldstream, Duns, Eyemouth, Galashiels, Hawick, Jedburgh, Kelso, Melrose and Selkirk.

== Boundaries ==
Map of current boundaries

As created by the Fifth periodic review of Westminster constituencies for the 2005 general election, the Berwickshire, Roxburgh and Selkirk constituency covers the majority of the Scottish Borders council area. The rest of the council area is covered by the Dumfriesshire, Clydesdale and Tweeddale constituency, which also covers part of the Dumfries and Galloway council area and part of the South Lanarkshire council area.

Under the 2023 review of Westminster constituencies which came into effect for the 2024 general election, the boundaries are unchanged and are defined as comprising the following wards of the Scottish Border Council:

- In full: Hawick and Hermitage, Selkirkshire, Hawick and Denholm, Jedburgh and District, Kelso and District, Mid Berwickshire, East Berwickshire, Leaderdale and Melrose, Galashiels and District.
- In part: Tweeddale East (small eastern area).

== History ==
Michael Moore held the seat from its creation in 2005, and was MP for the predecessor seat of Tweeddale, Ettrick & Lauderdale from 1997 to 2005. The seat and its predecessor seats (Roxburgh and Berwickshire and Tweeddale, Ettrick & Lauderdale) had a strong Liberal Party presence since the 1960s, with former Liberal leader David Steel having represented the seat from 1965 to 1997. Historically, the Conservative Party has been the main challenger to the seat, and they currently hold the equivalent Holyrood seat. At the 2015 general election, Moore and the Liberal Democrats were pushed into third place in the constituency, and the seat was narrowly won by Calum Kerr of the Scottish National Party over the Conservative candidate, John Lamont, by 328 votes.

At the 2017 snap election, Lamont (who contested the seat for the fourth consecutive election) won the seat from Calum Kerr of the SNP by 11,060 votes - polling more votes than any other candidate in Scotland, and making it the safest Conservative seat in Scotland.

Two years later, at the 2019 general election, held in the wake of parliamentary deadlock and Brexit negotiations, the Conservatives called another election and achieved their best national result since 1987, winning a comfortable majority of 80 seats at the election, with Lamont being re-elected as MP for Berwickshire, Roxburgh and Selkirk. He held the seat with a reduced majority of 5,148 votes, due to a swing towards the SNP and Liberal Democrats.

The boundaries were unchanged by the 2023 review of Westminster constituencies. At the 2024 general election, despite a reduction in his vote, Lamont held on to the seat with an increased majority of 6,599 votes due to the SNP vote falling further.

== Members of Parliament ==
Election	Member	Party
2005	Michael Moore	Liberal Democrat
2015	Calum Kerr	SNP
2017	John Lamont	Conservative

== Elections ==
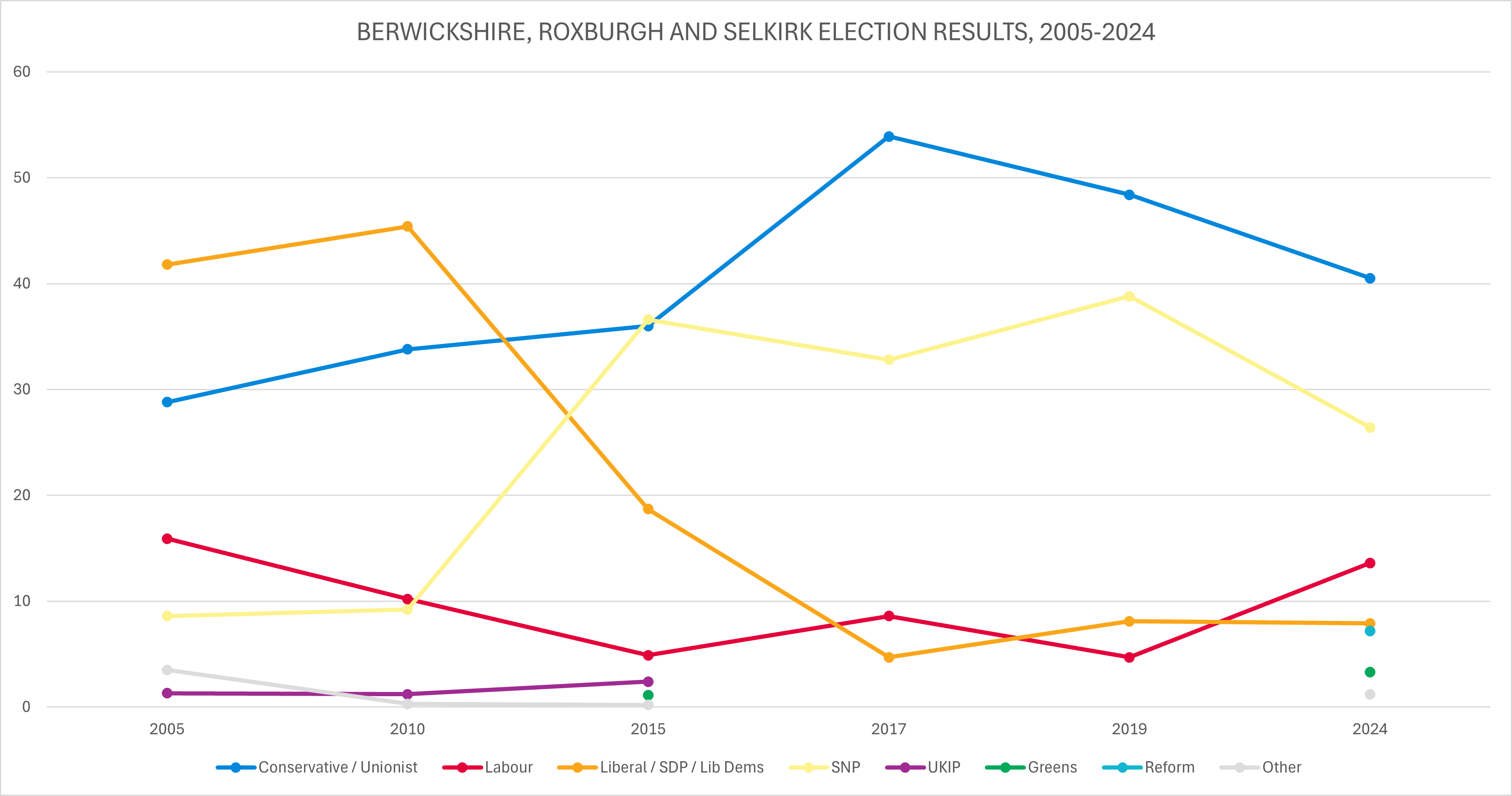
Election results 2005-2024

=== Elections in the 2020s ===
2024 general election: Berwickshire, Roxburgh and Selkirk
Party	Candidate	Votes	%	±%
Conservative	John Lamont	18,872	40.5	−7.9
SNP	David Wilson	12,273	26.4	−12.4
Labour	Caitlin Stott	6,311	13.6	+8.9
Liberal Democrats	Ray Georgeson	3,686	7.9	−0.2
Reform	Carolyn Grant	3,340	7.2	New
Green	Neil MacKinnon	1,526	3.3	New
Independent	Ellie Merton	329	0.7	New
Scottish Family	Hamish Goldie-Scot	221	0.5	New
Majority		6,599	14.1	+4.5
Turnout		46,558	60.9	−10.3
Registered electors		76,438		
Conservative hold		Swing	+2.3	

=== Elections in the 2010s ===
2019 general election: Berwickshire, Roxburgh and Selkirk
Party	Candidate	Votes	%	±%
Conservative	John Lamont	25,747	48.4	−5.5
SNP	Calum Kerr	20,599	38.8	+6.0
Liberal Democrats	Jenny Marr	4,287	8.1	+3.4
Labour	Ian Davidson	2,513	4.7	−3.9
Majority		5,148	9.6	−11.5
Turnout		53,146	71.3	−0.2
Conservative hold		Swing	−5.7	

2017 general election: Berwickshire, Roxburgh and Selkirk
Party	Candidate	Votes	%	±%
Conservative	John Lamont	28,213	53.9	+17.9
SNP	Calum Kerr	17,153	32.8	−3.8
Labour Co-op	Ian Davidson	4,519	8.6	+3.7
Liberal Democrats	Caroline Burgess	2,482	4.7	−14.0
Majority		11,060	21.1	N/A
Turnout		52,367	71.5	−2.7
Conservative gain from SNP		Swing	+10.8	

2015 general election: Berwickshire, Roxburgh & Selkirk
Party	Candidate	Votes	%	±%
SNP	Calum Kerr	20,145	36.6	+27.4
Conservative	John Lamont	19,817	36.0	+2.2
Liberal Democrats	Michael Moore	10,294	18.7	−26.7
Labour	Kenryck Jones	2,700	4.9	−5.3
UKIP	Peter Neilson	1,316	2.4	+1.2
Green	Pauline Stewart	631	1.1	New
Independent	Jesse Rae	135	0.2	New
Majority		328	0.6	N/A
Turnout		55,038	74.2	+7.8
SNP gain from Liberal Democrats		Swing	+27.1	

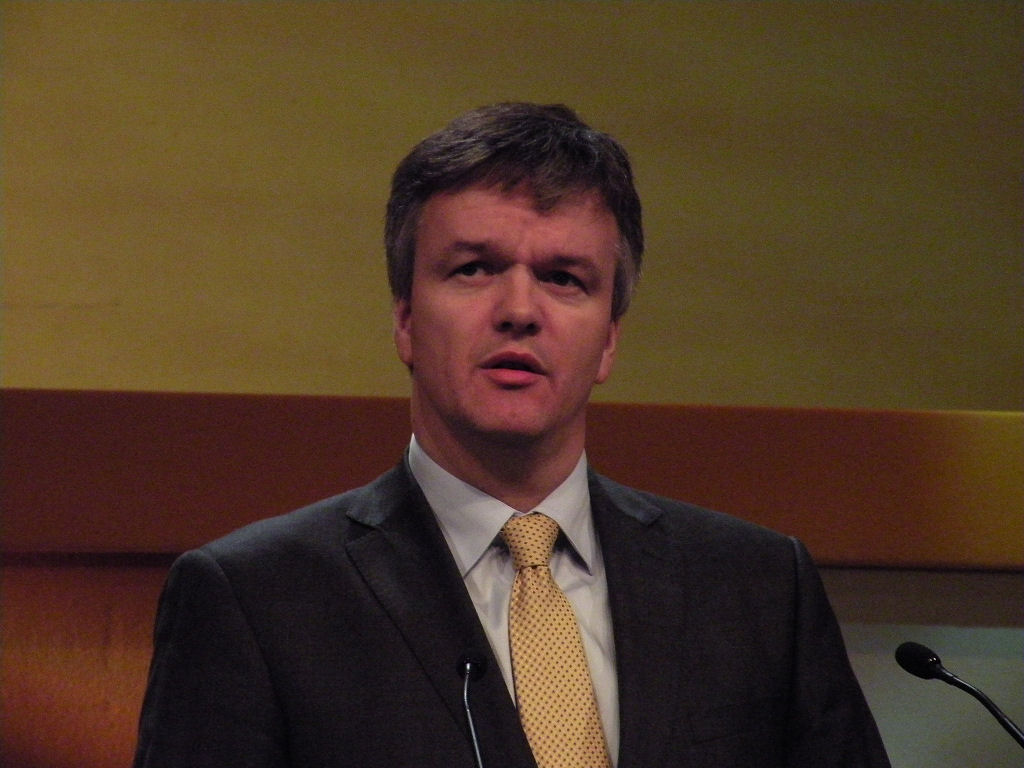
Michael Moore

2010 general election: Berwickshire, Roxburgh & Selkirk
Party	Candidate	Votes	%	±%
Liberal Democrats	Michael Moore	22,230	45.4	+3.6
Conservative	John Lamont	16,555	33.8	+5.0
Labour	Ian Miller	5,003	10.2	−5.7
SNP	Paul Wheelhouse	4,497	9.2	+0.6
UKIP	Sherry Fowler	595	1.2	−0.1
Scottish Jacobite	Chris Black	134	0.3	New
Majority		5,675	11.6	−1.4
Turnout		49,014	66.4	+3.1
Liberal Democrats hold		Swing	−0.7	

=== Elections in the 2000s ===
2005 general election: Berwickshire, Roxburgh & Selkirk
Party	Candidate	Votes	%	±%
Liberal Democrats	Michael Moore	18,993	41.8	−5.0
Conservative	John Lamont	13,092	28.8	+6.8
Labour	Sam Held	7,206	15.9	−1.0
SNP	Aileen Orr	3,885	8.6	−2.8
Liberal	John Hein	916	2.0	+1.6
Scottish Socialist	Graeme McIver	695	1.5	±0.0
UKIP	Peter Neilson	601	1.3	+0.3
Majority		5,901	13.0	−11.8
Turnout		45,388	63.3	
Liberal Democrats win (new seat)				
