= Roxburgh and Berwickshire =

Roxburgh and Berwickshire may refer to:

- Roxburgh and Berwickshire (Scottish Parliament constituency)
- Roxburgh and Berwickshire (UK Parliament constituency)
