= Danny Alexander =

British banker (born 1972)

The Right Honourable Sir Danny Alexander
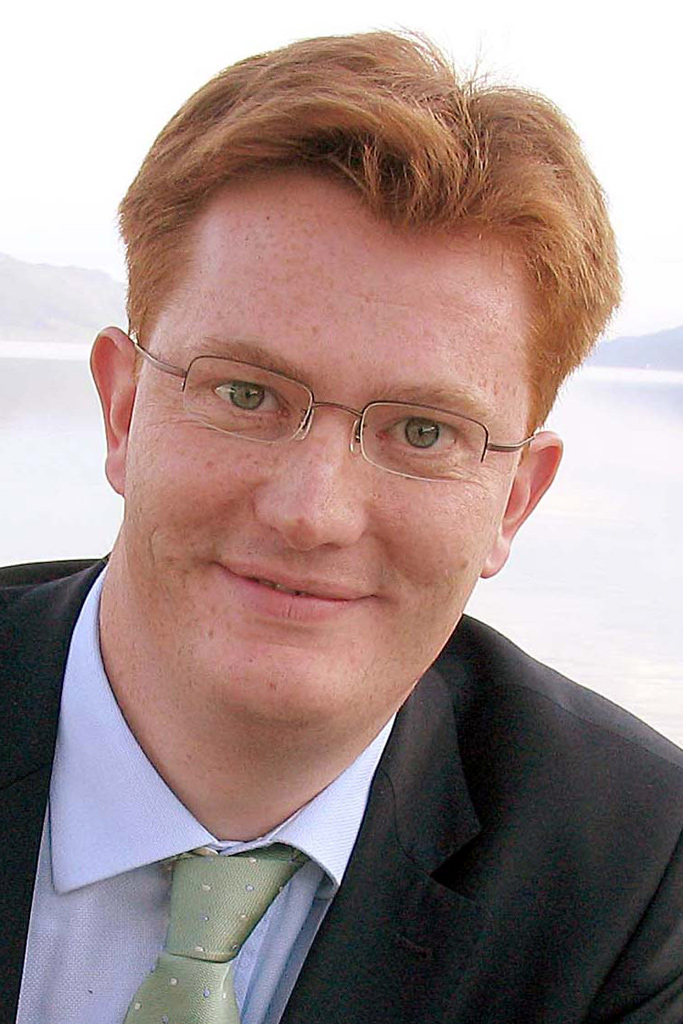
- Alexander's Ministerial portrait, 2011

Chief Secretary to the Treasury
- In office 29 May 2010 – 8 May 2015
- Prime Minister: David Cameron
- Chancellor: George Osborne
- Preceded by: David Laws
- Succeeded by: Greg Hands

Secretary of State for Scotland
- In office 12 May 2010 – 29 May 2010
- Prime Minister: David Cameron
- Preceded by: Jim Murphy
- Succeeded by: Michael Moore

Liberal Democrat Treasury spokesperson
- In office 7 January 2015 – 11 May 2015
- Leader: Nick Clegg
- Preceded by: Vince Cable (2010)^{[a]}
- Succeeded by: Baroness Kramer

Member of Parliament for Inverness, Nairn, Badenoch and Strathspey
- In office 5 May 2005 – 30 March 2015
- Preceded by: Constituency established
- Succeeded by: Drew Hendry

Personal details
- Born: Daniel Grian Alexander; 15 May 1972 (age 54) Edinburgh, Scotland
- Party: Liberal Democrats
- Spouse: Rebecca Hoar (m. 2005)
- Children: 2
- Education: St Anne's College, Oxford (BA)
- Alexander's voice Alexander speaking at the Scottish Parliament in 2015
- a. Office vacant from 12 May 2010 to 7 January 2015.

Sir Daniel Grian Alexander (born 15 May 1972) is a British banker, lobbyist and former politician who was Chief Secretary to the Treasury between 2010 and 2015. He was the Member of Parliament (MP) for the Inverness, Nairn, Badenoch & Strathspey constituency from 2005 until the general election in May 2015. In his first parliamentary term (2005–2010), Alexander was the Liberal Democrat spokesperson for Work and Pensions (2007–2008), the Chief of Staff to party leader Nick Clegg, and Chair of the Liberal Democrat Manifesto Group (2007–2010).

With the 2010 general election producing a hung parliament, he was one of the four Liberal Democrat MPs, along with Andrew Stunell, Chris Huhne, and David Laws, who were involved in negotiating the coalition agreement for the new coalition government with the Conservative Party. Alexander was initially appointed Secretary of State for Scotland, but at the end of May 2010, he was promoted to Chief Secretary to the Treasury, following the resignation of David Laws.

He was knighted in the 2015 Dissolution Honours on 27 August 2015.

== Early life and education ==
Alexander was born in Edinburgh. As a child he lived on the island of Colonsay where his father was a firefighter, potter and deputy pier master. He attended Colonsay Primary School. The family then moved briefly to South Uist in the Outer Hebrides, and next to Invergarry on the mainland, where he attended Invergarry Primary School.

He was then educated at Lochaber High School, Fort William in the Scottish Highlands. He went on to study Philosophy, politics and economics (PPE) at St Anne's College, Oxford.

== Early career ==
From 1993 to 1994, Alexander worked as a press officer with the Scottish Liberal Democrats, before spending eight years as the Director of communications at the European Movement (1996–1999) and its successor organisation, the Britain in Europe campaign (1999–2004). From 2004 to 2005, he was the head of communications for Cairngorms National Park, considered by some critics as being his "biggest job outside of politics".

== Member of Parliament ==
Alexander was elected to the newly formed constituency of Inverness, Nairn, Badenoch and Strathspey in the 2005 general election. He won the seat from David Stewart, who was previously the Labour MP for Inverness East, Nairn and Lochaber, the basis of the new constituency.

In August 2005, it was revealed that Christopher Haskins, a Labour peer who was a friend of Alexander, had donated £2,500 to Alexander's campaign; subsequently Haskins was expelled from the Labour party for this action.

=== Front bench spokesman ===
At the start of the new parliament in 2005, Alexander was appointed by party leader Charles Kennedy as a junior spokesman for Work and Pensions, responsible for disability issues, where he contributed to debates on incapacity Benefit reform, the Child Support Agency and the Turner Report on future pension provision in the United Kingdom. From 2005 to 2008, he was also a member of the Scottish Affairs Select Committee.

In 2007, he was appointed as Liberal Democrat spokesperson for Social Exclusion for six months, before becoming the party's spokesperson for Work and Pensions, holding the post until June 2008. He gave this post up to focus on his role as chief of staff to the new party leader, Nick Clegg, as well as his responsibility for leading the preparation of the party's election manifesto.

=== Chief of staff to Nick Clegg ===
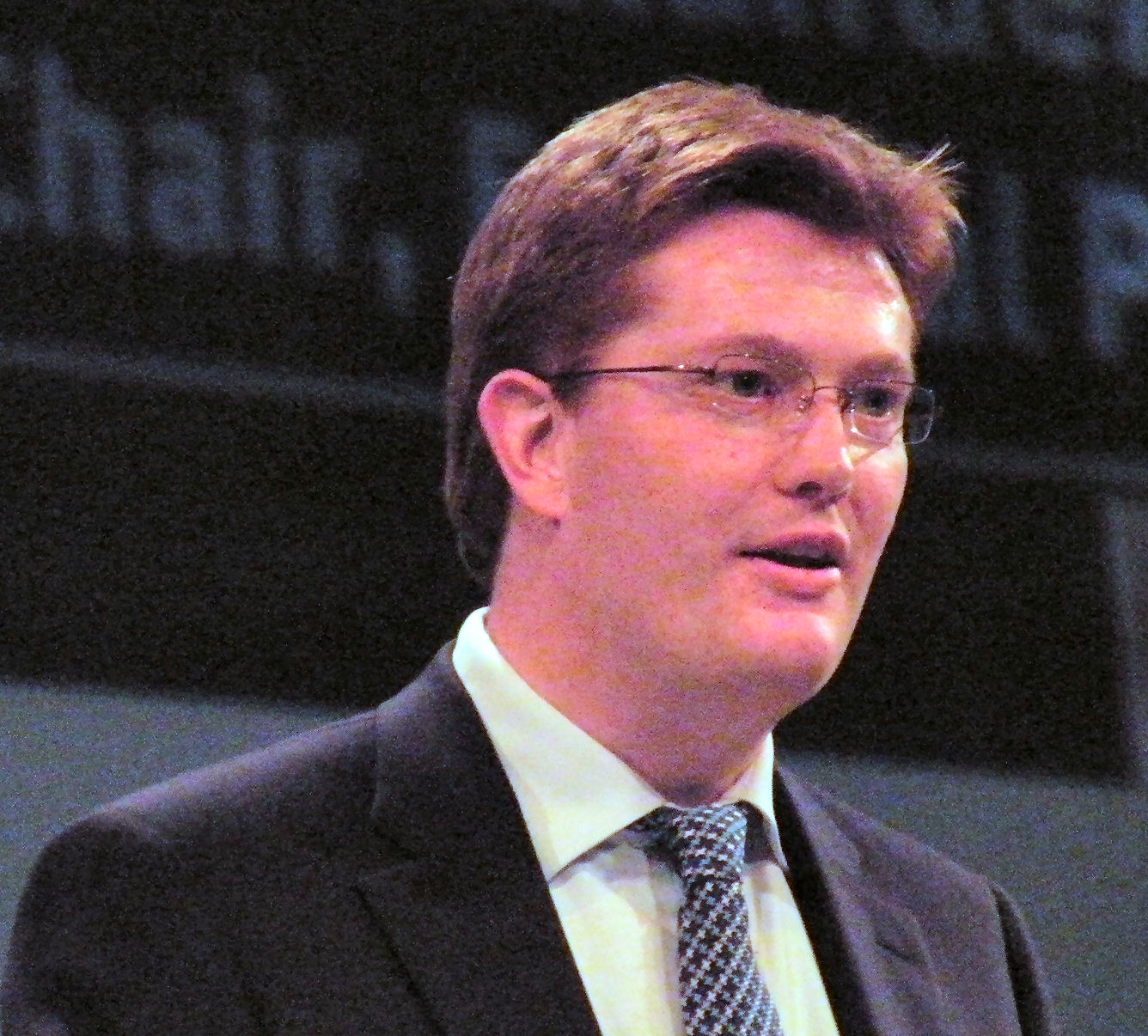
Alexander at the Liberal Democrat party conference in 2008

In June 2008, Alexander gave up the Work and Pensions brief to become Chief of Staff to the Leader of the Liberal Democrats, Nick Clegg. As part of his role Alexander became the main author of the 2010 Liberal Democrat general election manifesto and became a confidant of the leader. Following the election Alexander became one to the key negotiators in the coalition discussions with the Conservatives and played a key role in the negotiating of the Coalition agreement alongside Oliver Letwin.

== Coalition Government ==
Following the 2010 general election, Alexander was part of the Liberal Democrats key negotiating team alongside Chris Huhne, David Laws and Andrew Stunell that brokered the agreement to go into a governing coalition with the Conservatives. He was initially appointed Secretary of State for Scotland for the coalition government, then was appointed Chief Secretary to the Treasury after the resignation of David Laws on 29 May 2010. He was appointed as a Privy Counsellor on 13 May 2010.

=== Secretary of State for Scotland ===
Following the negotiations between the Conservatives and Liberal Democrats, Alexander was appointed to the cabinet as the Secretary of State for Scotland making him one of five Liberal Democrats to serve in the Cameron–Clegg coalition.

As part of his role Alexander was given responsibility to implement the recommendations of the Calman Commission which was to give more fiscal powers to the Scottish Parliament, the promise to implement the proposals had formed part of the coalition agreement. See also: Scotland Act 2012

In his first official visit to Scotland in his new capacity Alexander was accompanied by the Prime Minister David Cameron for a series of meetings with the First Minister Alex Salmond. Cameron called for a fresh start in relations between the parliaments in Westminster and Holyrood and committed to appearing every year to answer questions at the Scottish Parliament.

Alexander's tenure as Scottish Secretary was short lived, and just over two weeks from his appointment on 29 May 2010 he was promoted to the role of Chief Secretary to the Treasury following the resignation of David Laws. Michael Moore, MP for Berwickshire, Roxburgh and Selkirk, replaced Alexander as Secretary of State for Scotland.

=== Chief Secretary to the Treasury ===
The move to the Treasury and the effective number two position to chancellor George Osborne marked his second cabinet post in under a month. The role effectively put Alexander in charge of the government's deficit reduction plan.

==== Capital gains tax controversy ====
Two days after being appointed to his new position, The Daily Telegraph newspaper published front-page allegations that Alexander had exploited a legal loophole to avoid the payment of capital gains tax on a property he had sold in 2007 alleging that he had profited from a "morally dubious" loophole to avoid paying capital gains tax. A few days earlier, the same newspaper had caused the resignation of Alexander's predecessor David Laws after finding irregularities in his expenses claims. The paper suggested that "the fact that Mr Alexander has become the second Lib Dem to face questions about his finances within three days has focused attention on whether the party leadership has properly audited the financial activities of its senior figures".

Alexander had bought the property, a London flat, in 1999 and, after being elected to parliament for a Scottish constituency in 2005, designated the property as his "second home" while claiming that his first home was now in his constituency. The property was then sold in 2007 for a profit on which he paid no capital gains tax.

As the property was the only one he owned, up until 2006, HM Revenue and Customs rules meant that capital gains tax was not payable as should someone find a buyer for their home within three years the property qualifies for relief from [capital gains tax] as long as the property has been the only or main home at some point. Speaking at the time Alexander said "I have always listed London as my second home on the basis set out in the parliamentary rules as I spent more time in Scotland than I did in London." The Daily Telegraph stated "there is no suggestion that Mr Alexander has actually broken any tax laws".

==== 2010 Spending Review ====
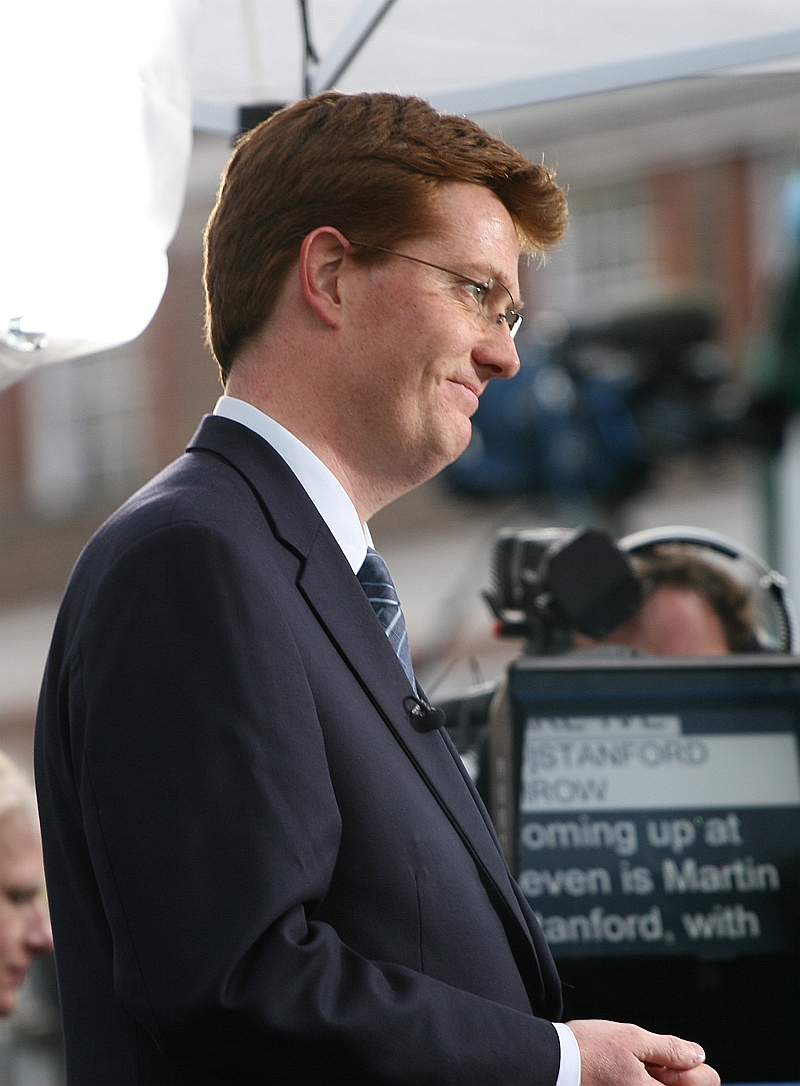
Alexander speaking to Sky News in 2010

On 8 June 2010 Alexander and the Chancellor George Osborne announced details of how they would conduct the government's spending review which would set spending limits for every government department for the period from 2011 to 2012 up until 2014–15. As part of the review due to be announced on 20 October 2010 a star chamber was established chaired by Osborne and Alexander designed to scrutinise the spending plans of each government department. Shortly after the announcement of how the review would take place, Alexander announced on 17 June 2010 that £2 billion worth of projects agreed by the previous Labour government would be cancelled. The projects included an £80 million loan to Sheffield Forgemasters and the cancellation of a £25 million visitors centre at Stonehenge. Labour attacked the plans as an "attack on jobs" but Alexander countered by saying that the previous government had gone on a "pre-election spending spree in the full knowledge that the government had long since run out of money."

Following the announcement on the cancellation of projects, Alexander worked closely with Chancellor George Osborne to produce an emergency budget on 22 June 2010 which announced a series of measures designed to reduce the United Kingdom's budget deficit. Measures included a rise in the rate of VAT from 17.5% to 20% starting in 2011, a rise in Capital gains tax from 18% to 28% and the introduction of a levy on the banks designed to raise £2 billion a year. Defending the budget against allegations that it disproportionately hit the poor hardest, Alexander described it as "fair" and "progressive" saying "this is a Budget that protects the most vulnerable – especially children in poverty and pensioners – while ensuring those with the broadest shoulders take the greatest share of the burden.".

Following the budget, and in the period until the spending review, Alexander found himself at the heart of controversial spending decisions made by the government. A series of leaked letters from cabinet ministers showed that the spending review was causing strain within government departments including within the Department for Work and Pensions when a memo from Osborne to Iain Duncan Smith suggested that deep cuts to the welfare budget had already been agreed, prompting accusations by Labour that the cuts were "vicious" and an attack on the poorest in society. In response Alexander said "I am not going to comment on a leaked letter but what I will say is that with welfare spending making up nearly £200 billion, of course it is something we have to look at in the context of the spending review."

Further controversy came when the Treasury announced that the Ministry of Defence would have to include the £20 billion replacement of Trident within their budget on top of potential cuts of potentially up to 10 and 20%. Secretary of State for Defence Liam Fox later wrote to David Cameron in another leaked letter saying that cuts in defence spending would seriously damage troops' morale. Kenneth Clarke, the Secretary of State for Justice, said that he was "relishing" life back at the centre of government and said that the discussions on the spending review he had with Danny Alexander were "rather informal but quite intense and serious."

On 19 October 2010, the day before the spending review was announced in the House of Commons, Alexander was photographed reading a memo which showed that as a result of the cuts the government would be announcing up to 490,000 public service jobs could be lost. The figure contained within confidential briefing papers came from the Office for Budget Responsibility (OBR).

On 20 October 2010, the chancellor George Osborne announced the findings of the review which included the claim from the OBR. Other key points from the review included an average 19% cut in departmental budgets, the desire to eliminate the structural deficit by 2015, £7bn extra in cuts to welfare spending and a move for the retirement age to be increased to 66 for both men and women by 2020. In a letter to Liberal Democrat members Alexander defended the cuts by saying "When we came into office, we inherited an economy that was on the brink. With the largest budget deficit in Europe and no plan for tackling it, Britain faced huge economic risks. These could only be dealt with by a clear plan to deal rapidly with the worst financial position this country has faced for generations."

Despite the scale of the cuts announced Alexander, in his letter, went on to claim that the burden had been spread fairly by ensuring that key public services relied on by the most vulnerable in society had been protected. He emphasised the announcement of the 'fairness premium' designed to help the poorest children and noted that key transport projects had been given the go ahead as well as the announcement of a green investment bank.

==== Bank lobbying ====
It was reported in the Independent in December 2011 that Danny Alexander had been involved in meetings with bankers lobbying to avoid proposals in the Vickers Report that were intended to reduce risks in the banking industry. The talks were alleged to be secret, but were obtained via a Freedom of Information request.

=== North Sea oil windfall tax ===
Alexander caused controversy after giving a speech to a group of businessmen that a £10 billion windfall tax on North Sea oil revenue in the 2011 budget was his idea. The move has been estimated to cost up to 40,000 jobs.

=== Trident nuclear review ===
On 22 September 2012, Danny Alexander was appointed by Nick Clegg to review alternatives to like-for-like replacement of the Trident nuclear missile system, after Minister of State for the Armed Forces Nick Harvey left the government in David Cameron's government reshuffle.

=== Allegations of "pork-barrel politics" ahead of the 2015 general election ===
In January 2015, Nick Clegg was accused of a "desperate ploy" to save Alexander's seat from the SNP by offering the possibility of completing a city deal for Inverness just ahead of the 2015 general election. Highland council had been lobbying for a deal worth up to £300 million to improve tourist and sports facilities.

=== "Yellow budget" ===
The day after approving the last budget of the Coalition as set out by George Osborne, Alexander took the unprecedented step of issuing an alternative fiscal plan for the next Parliament based on Liberal Democrat policy. In a sparsely attended Commons session Alexander announced plans to borrow £70 billion less than Labour and cut £50 billion less than the Conservatives in the next parliament. He was barracked by Labour MPs throughout, who repeatedly alluded to the Red Book containing the official budget unveiled the day before.

== After politics ==
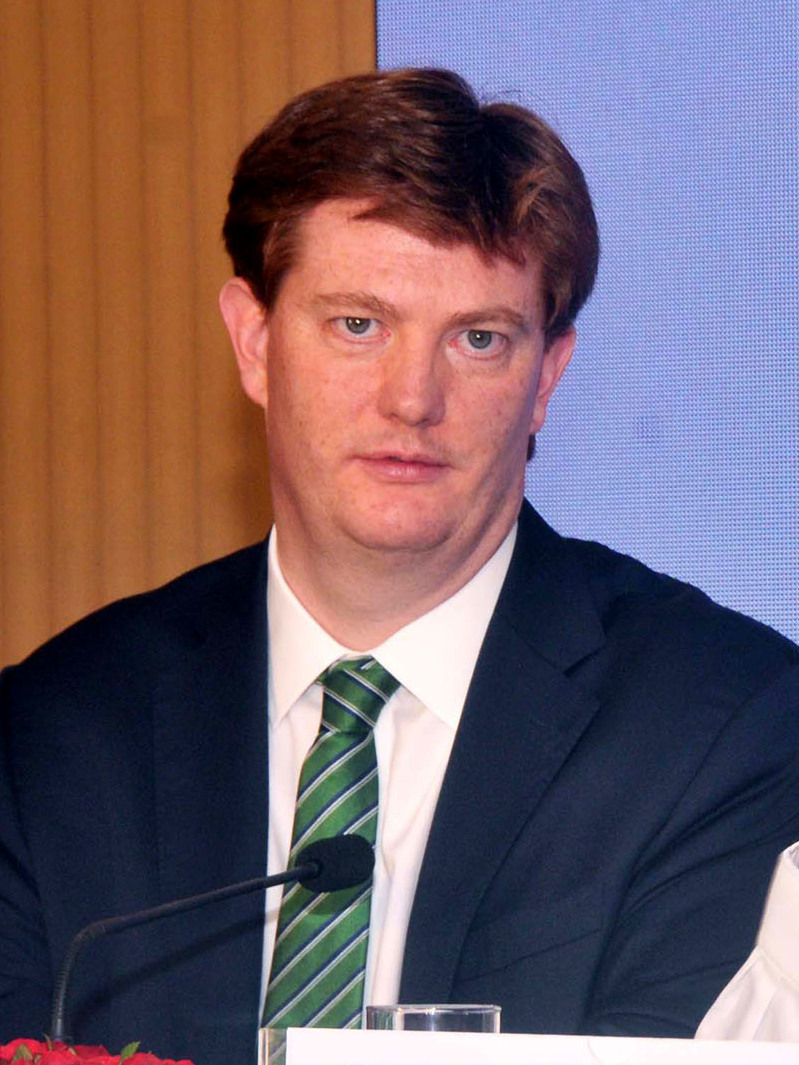
Alexander in 2018

In the 2015 general election, with 31.3% of the vote, Alexander lost his seat to the Scottish National Party's Drew Hendry, who received 50.1% of the votes cast. He was offered a position in the House of Lords but declined. He later became vice president for policy and strategy at the Asian Infrastructure Investment Bank. He is currently CEO of Infrastructure Finance and Sustainability, Corporate and Institutional Banking (CIB) at HSBC, leading sustainable finance and clean tech initiatives.

== Personal life ==
Alexander married Rebecca Hoar in July 2005 in Chippenham. They have two children.

In October 2010, Deputy Leader of the Labour Party Harriet Harman mentioned Alexander during her speech at the Labour Party's Scottish Conference, referring to his red hair. She said, "Now, many of us in the Labour Party are conservationists and we all love the red squirrel. But there is one ginger rodent which we never want to see again in the Highlands – Danny Alexander." The speech generated controversial media attention and Alexander responded stating he was "proud" of his hair colour. Harman later apologised, admitting her conduct was "wrong".

In November 2012 the Cairngorm Brewery rebranded their beer called "Cairngorm Gold" as "Ginger Rodent" with Alexander's agreement and cooperation (as of 2026, said beer is still available as "Cairngorm Gold", and "Ginger Rodent" is absent from the manufacturer's website). This same beer is also exported to Australia where it is called "Sheepshaggers Gold". The brewery is located in his former constituency.

Alexander has been nicknamed "Beaker" due to his resemblance to The Muppet Show character.

Alexander is a self described heavy metal fan.

Parliament of the United Kingdom
New constituency	Member of Parliament for Inverness, Nairn, Badenoch and Strathspey; 2005–2015	Succeeded by Drew Hendry
Political offices
Preceded by Jim Murphy	Secretary of State for Scotland; 2010	Succeeded by Michael Moore
Preceded by David Laws	Chief Secretary to the Treasury; 2010–2015	Succeeded by Greg Hands
