= Calum Kerr =

Scottish politician

Calum Kerr MSP
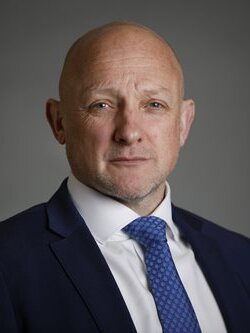
- Official Portrait 2026

Member of the Scottish Parliament for Midlothian South, Tweeddale and Lauderdale
- Incumbent
- Assumed office 7 May 2026
- Preceded by: Christine Grahame
- Majority: 7,161 (20.8%)

Convener of the Delegated Powers and Law Reform Committee
- Incumbent
- Assumed office 10 June 2026

SNP Spokesperson for Environment and Rural Affairs
- In office 20 May 2015 – 9 June 2017
- Leader: Angus Robertson
- Preceded by: Position established
- Succeeded by: Angus MacNeil

Member of Parliament for Berwickshire, Roxburgh and Selkirk
- In office 8 May 2015 – 3 May 2017
- Preceded by: Michael Moore
- Succeeded by: John Lamont

Personal details
- Born: Calum Robert Kerr; 5 April 1972 (age 54) Galashiels, Scotland
- Party: Scottish National Party
- Education: University of St Andrews
- Website: Official website

Calum Robert Kerr (born 5 April 1972) is a Scottish National Party politician. He has been a Member of the Scottish Parliament for Midlothian South, Tweedale and Lauderdale since the 2026 election, and is currently the convener of the Delegated Powers and Law Reform Committee. He was also previously the Member of Parliament for Berwickshire, Roxburgh and Selkirk from 2015 to 2017. During this time he was the SNP's Environment and Rural Affairs spokesperson in the House of Commons.

== Early life ==
Kerr was born in Galashiels in the Scottish Borders. He attended Peebles High School where his father was the head teacher. Kerr read History at St Andrews University. Prior to politics, he worked in sales for IT companies; including Avaya.

== Political career ==
The seat, and its predecessors Tweeddale, Ettrick and Lauderdale and Roxburgh, Selkirk and Peebles, had been held by the Scottish Liberal Democrats and the Scottish Liberal Party since 1965.

Kerr was elected in the May 2015 general election, unseating the Liberal Democrat incumbent Michael Moore and finishing just 328 votes ahead of John Lamont of the Conservative Party. He was the SNP's Environment and Rural Affairs spokesperson in the House of Commons.

He stood for re-election at the 2017 general election, but was defeated by Lamont, who won a majority of 11,060 votes; the largest Conservative majority gained in a Scottish seat at that election. He stood again in 2019 but was defeated, although he reduced the Conservative majority.

In May 2025, Kerr was selected for the constituency of Midlothian South, Tweeddale and Lauderdale ahead of the 2026 Scottish Parliament election. He was elected constituency MSP.

Parliament of the United Kingdom
Preceded by Michael Moore	Member of Parliament for Berwickshire, Roxburgh and Selkirk; 2015–2017	Succeeded by John Lamont
