= UK Private Capital =

Trade association in the UK

- Formation: 1983; 43 years ago
- Legal status: Industry body
- Purpose: Private equity and venture capital trade organisation
- Location: London, United Kingdom
- Members: 500 (2022)
- Funding: Members fees
- Website: https://www.ukprivatecapital.co.uk/

The UK Private Capital (formerly the British Private Equity and Venture Capital Association, sometimes known simply as the British Venture Capital Association, or BVCA), is a trade organisation for the private equity and venture capital industry in the United Kingdom. It was founded in 1983 and has more than 500 member firms, including over 230 private equity and venture capital houses, as well as institutional investors, professional advisers, service providers and international associations as members. Michael Moore is the director general. The Chair is elected annually by the members. The organization lobbies on regulatory, tax and governmental matters that relate to private equity owned businesses in the UK.

It produces reports on, among other topics, the relative rate of return on UK private equity and venture capital funds and organises conferences.

Sandra Robertson, chief executive of the Oxford Endowment Fund, used a BVCA conference in 2012 to criticise private equity funds’ documents for containing “pages and pages of legal jargon”.

In 2021, it hosted a discussion on the industry’s "perception problem".

In 2022, it announced that it planned to develop a practical guide for making climate-related financial disclosures.
