= Archy Kirkwood =

British politician

The Right Honourable The Lord Kirkwood of Kirkhope PC
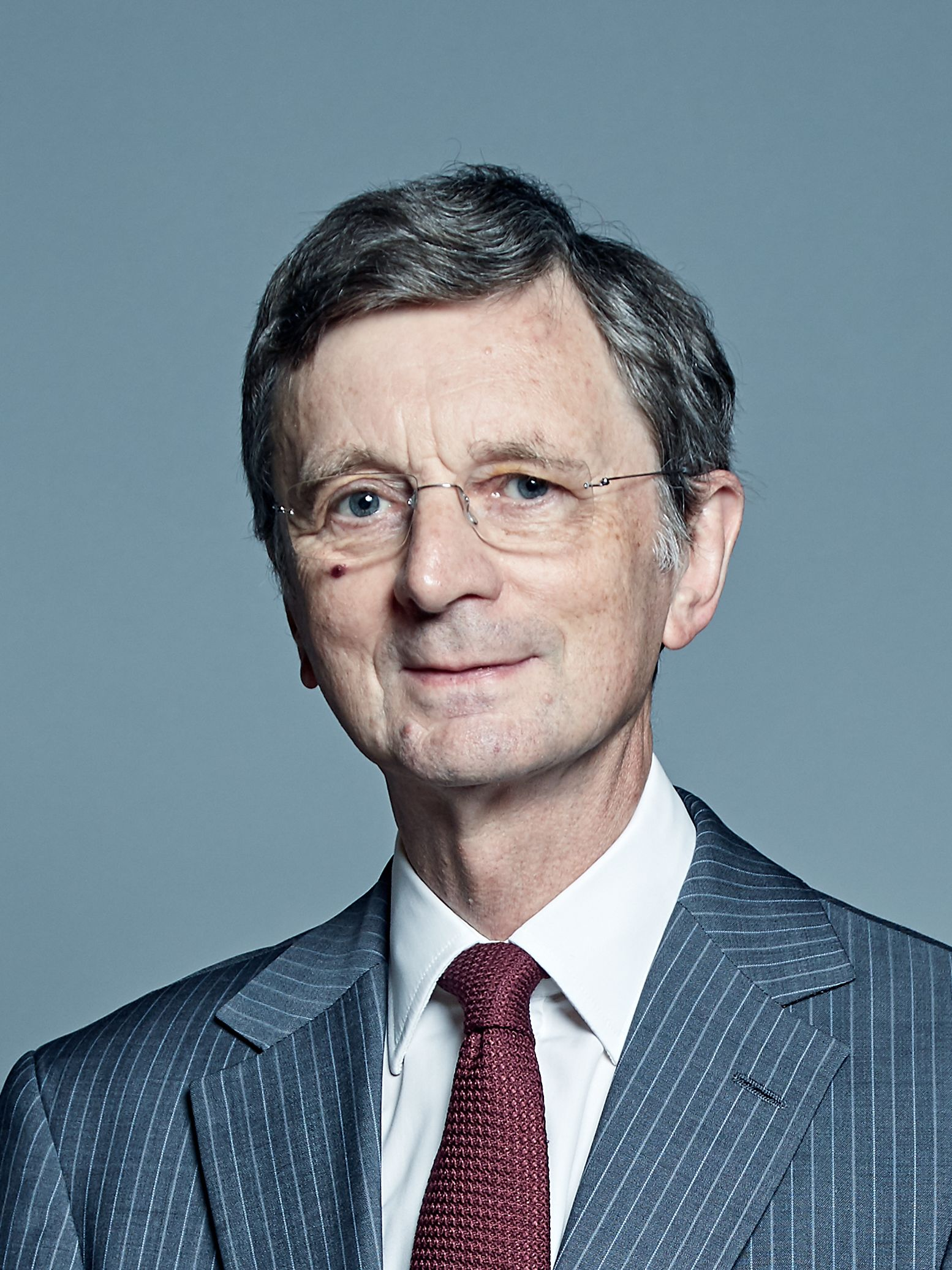

Chief Whip of the Liberal Democrats
- In office 9 April 1992 – 1 May 1997
- Leader: Paddy Ashdown
- Preceded by: Jim Wallace
- Succeeded by: Paul Tyler

Member of the House of Lords
- Lord Temporal
- Life peerage 10 June 2005 – 2 September 2020

Member of Parliament for Roxburgh and Berwickshire
- In office 9 June 1983 – 11 April 2005
- Preceded by: Constituency created
- Succeeded by: Constituency abolished

Personal details
- Born: 22 April 1946 (age 80)
- Party: Liberal Democrat
- Spouse: Rosemary Chester
- Education: Heriot-Watt University

Archibald Johnstone Kirkwood, Baron Kirkwood of Kirkhope, PC (born 22 April 1946), is a British Liberal Democrat politician.

== Education ==
Kirkwood was educated at Cranhill Secondary School in Cranhill, Glasgow, and studied pharmacy at Heriot-Watt University, gaining a BSc in 1971. He became a solicitor in Hawick and Notary public.

== Parliamentary career ==
Kirkwood first joined parliament in 1971 as a parliamentary assistant as part of the Joseph Rowntree Social Service Trust (now the Joseph Rowntree Reform Trust) Political Fellowship Scheme. In 1971 he worked for David Steel MP in the office of the Liberal Chief Whip.

Kirkwood was the Liberal, and later Liberal Democrat, Member of Parliament for Roxburgh and Berwickshire from 1983 until 2005.

In 1986, he with two other MPs, Simon Hughes and Michael Meadowcroft, and the National League of Young Liberals and other parts of the party produced the booklet Across the Divide: Liberal Values on Defence and Disarmament. This was the rally call that defeated the party leadership in the debate over the issue of an independent nuclear deterrent. This led to Kirkwood and the other authors being jeered by other Liberal MPs and Peers at the 1986 Liberal Assembly.

A Chair of the Parliamentary Select Committee on Work and Pensions, Lord Kirkwood of Kirkhope, is listed in the House of Lords Register of Interests (Session 2006–2007) as the Chairman of the Unum Customer Advisory Panel for which he received payment from Unum. He received additional payments for other work for Unum.

== Personal life ==
Kirkwood was knighted in the 2003 New Year Honours, and dubbed by the Queen at the Palace of Holyroodhouse on 3 July 2003.

On 13 May 2005 it was announced that he would be created a life peer, and on 10 June 2005 he was created Baron Kirkwood of Kirkhope, of Kirkhope in Scottish Borders. He retired from the House of Lords on 2 September 2020.

He married Rosemary Chester on 30 December 1972. Lady Kirkwood died on 22 October 2019. They have a son and daughter.

Parliament of the United Kingdom
New constituency	Member of Parliament for Roxburgh and Berwickshire; 1983–2005	Constituency abolished (see Berwickshire, Roxburgh and Selkirk)
Party political offices
Preceded by Jim Wallace	Chief Whip of the Liberal Democrats; 1992–1997	Succeeded by Paul Tyler
Orders of precedence in the United Kingdom
Preceded by The Lord Adonis	Gentlemen; Baron Kirkwood of Kirkhope	Followed by The Lord Tyler
