= John Lamont =

Scottish politician (born 1976)

John Lamont MP
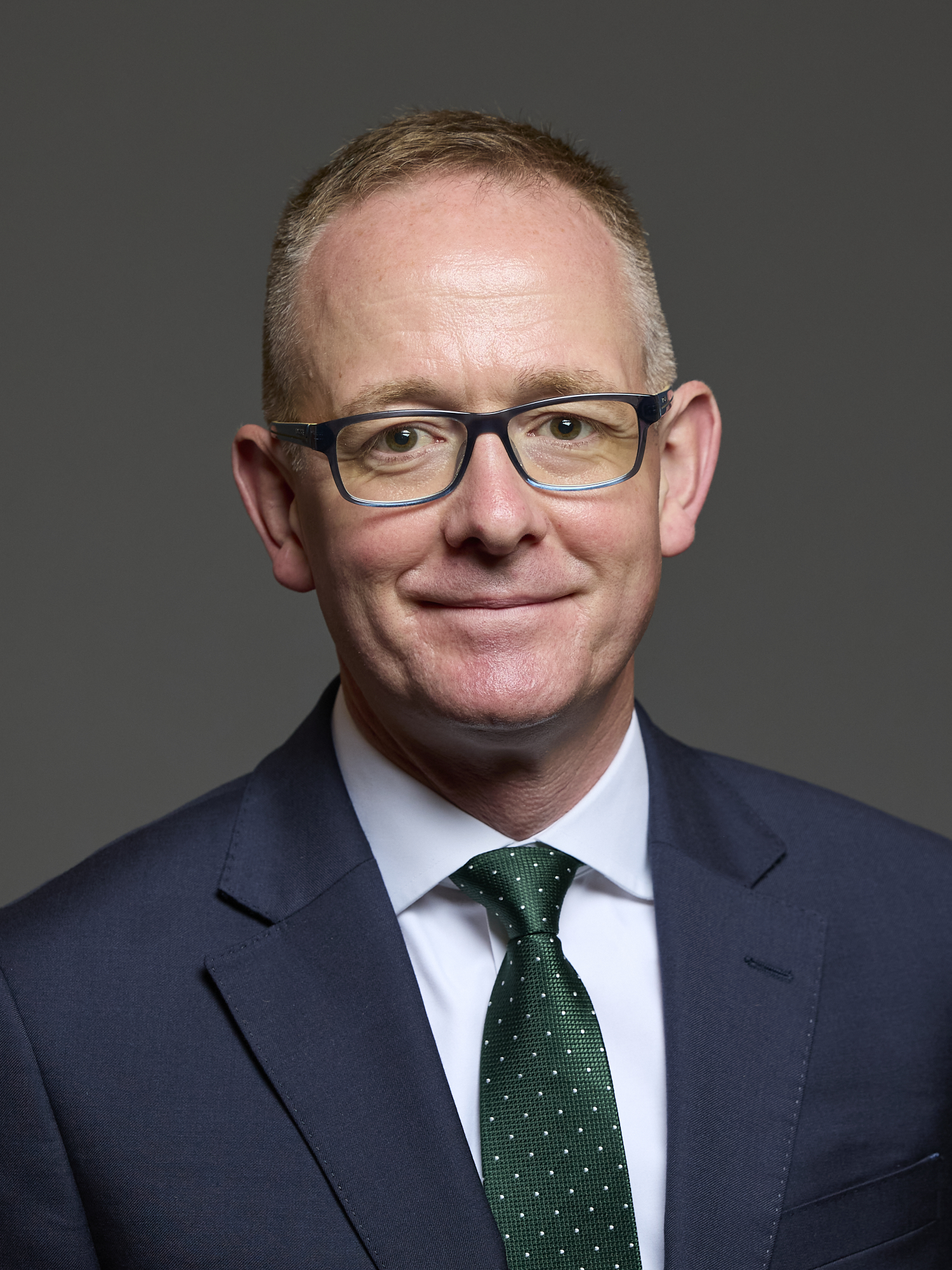
- Official portrait, 2024

Shadow Deputy Leader of the House of Commons
- Incumbent
- Assumed office 22 July 2025
- Leader: Kemi Badenoch
- Preceded by: Nick Smith (2024)

Shadow Secretary of State for Scotland
- In office 8 July 2024 – 5 November 2024
- Leader: Rishi Sunak
- Preceded by: Ian Murray
- Succeeded by: Andrew Bowie

Parliamentary Under-Secretary of State for Scotland
- In office 27 October 2022 – 5 July 2024 Serving with The Lord Offord of Garvel (2022–2024); The Lord Cameron of Lochiel (2024)
- Prime Minister: Rishi Sunak
- Preceded by: David Duguid
- Succeeded by: Kirsty McNeill

Member of Parliament for Berwickshire, Roxburgh and Selkirk
- Incumbent
- Assumed office 8 June 2017
- Preceded by: Calum Kerr
- Majority: 6,599 (14.1%)

Convener of the Scottish Parliament Justice Committee
- In office 1 March 2011 – 22 March 2011
- Preceded by: Bill Aitken
- Succeeded by: Christine Grahame

Member of the Scottish Parliament for Ettrick, Roxburgh and Berwickshire Roxburgh and Berwickshire (2007–2011)
- In office 3 May 2007 – 27 April 2017
- Preceded by: Euan Robson
- Succeeded by: Rachael Hamilton

Personal details
- Born: John Robert Lamont; 15 April 1976 (age 50) Irvine, Scotland
- Party: Scottish Conservatives
- Education: University of Glasgow
- Website: www.johnlamont.org

John Robert Lamont (born 15 April 1976) is a Scottish Conservative Party politician and solicitor who has served as the Member of Parliament (MP) for Berwickshire, Roxburgh and Selkirk since 2017, and has been Shadow Deputy Leader of the House of Commons since July 2025. He previously served as Shadow Secretary of State for Scotland from July to November 2024. Lamont served as the Member of the Scottish Parliament (MSP) for Roxburgh and Berwickshire, later Ettrick, Roxburgh and Berwickshire after boundary changes, from 2007 to 2017. He served as Parliamentary Under-Secretary of State for Scotland between October 2022 to July 2024.

== Early life and career ==
John Lamont was born on 15 April 1976 in Irvine and raised Kilwinning, the son of Robert and Elizabeth Lamont. He was educated at Kilwinning Academy and studied at the School of Law of the University of Glasgow where he gained a first class honours degree. He worked as a solicitor at Freshfields in London and then at Brodies in Edinburgh.

== Political career ==
In 2002, Lamont stood as a candidate in the London Borough of Lambeth in the Brixton Coldharbour ward where he finished in 10th place.

Lamont stood in Berwickshire, Roxburgh and Selkirk on three occasions before being elected in 2017; at the 2005, 2010 and 2015 general elections. At the 2005 general election, Lamont came second with 28.8% of the vote behind the Liberal Democrat candidate Michael Moore. Lamont came second at the 2010 general election with 33.8% of the vote, again behind Moore. At the 2015 general election, Lamont again came second, with 36% of the vote behind the SNP candidate Calum Kerr.

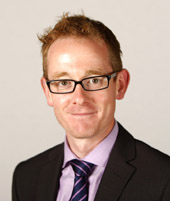
Lamont as an MSP in 2011

In May 2007, Lamont was elected Member of the Scottish Parliament for Roxburgh and Berwickshire, gaining the seat from the Scottish Liberal Democrats. In the 2011 Scottish Parliament election, he won the newly constituted Ettrick, Roxburgh and Berwickshire seat with an increased majority. As an MSP, he served as Scottish Conservative Chief Whip and Parliamentary Business Manager.

From 1 March to 22 March 2011, Lamont was briefly Convener of the Justice Committee following the resignation of Bill Aitken. He caused controversy in May 2011, during a debate on the Offensive Behaviour at Football and Threatening Communications (Scotland) Act, for accusing Catholic education in the west of Scotland to be 'state-sponsored conditioning of sectarian attitudes'.

Lamont announced his intention to stand down from this Holyrood seat effective 4 May 2017 to stand at the snap 2017 general election for the House of Commons constituency of Berwickshire, Roxburgh and Selkirk. As a constituency MSP, Lamont's resignation triggered a by-election in the constituency, which was won by Rachael Hamilton of the Scottish Conservatives.

== Parliamentary career ==
At the 2017 general election, Lamont was elected to Parliament as MP for Berwickshire, Roxburgh and Selkirk with 53.9% of the vote and a majority of 11,060. He was re-elected as MP for Berwickshire, Roxburgh and Selkirk at the 2019 general election with a decreased vote share of 48.4% and a decreased majority of 5,148.

Lamont was given the role of Parliamentary Private Secretary to the Foreign Office in November 2021. He resigned from this position on 6 June 2022 in order to vote against Boris Johnson in the vote of no confidence. He was previously critical of Johnson over the parties in Number 10 during lockdown, saying it was "sickening" to read about them.

Appointed on 26 October 2022, Lamont served as a Parliamentary Under-Secretary at the Scotland Office.

At the 2024 general election, Lamont was again re-elected, with a decreased vote share of 40.5% and an increased majority of 6,599. After the general election, Lamont was appointed as Shadow Secretary of State for Scotland.

In July 2025, Lamont was appointed as Shadow Deputy Leader of the House of Commons.

== Personal life ==
Lamont lives in Coldstream, Scottish Borders. In 2014 he became the first UK politician to complete an Ironman Triathlon and was the fastest MP in the 2018 London Marathon, with a time of 3:38:03, running to raise funds for MND Scotland and the My Name's Doddie Foundation. He also ran the 2019 London Marathon, raising money for Marie Curie Daffodil Appeal.

Scottish Parliament
Preceded by Euan Robson	Member of the Scottish Parliament for Roxburgh and Berwickshire; 2007–2011	Constituency abolished
New constituency	Member of the Scottish Parliament for Ettrick, Roxburgh and Berwickshire; 2011–2017	Succeeded by Rachael Hamilton
Parliament of the United Kingdom
Preceded by Calum Kerr	Member of Parliament for Berwickshire, Roxburgh and Selkirk; 2017–present	Incumbent
