= Rachael Hamilton =

Scottish Conservative politician (born 1970)

Rachael Hamilton MSP
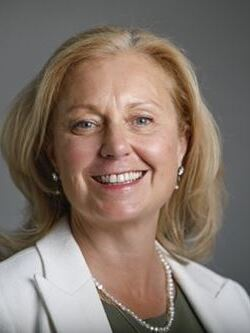
- Official portrait, 2026

Deputy Leader of the Scottish Conservative Party
- Incumbent
- Assumed office 28 September 2024
- Leader: Russell Findlay
- Preceded by: Meghan Gallacher

Member of the Scottish Parliament for Ettrick, Roxburgh and Berwickshire
- Incumbent
- Assumed office 10 June 2017
- Preceded by: John Lamont
- Majority: 5,277 (17.5%)

Member of the Scottish Parliament for South Scotland (1 of 7 regional MSPs)
- In office 6 May 2016 – 2 May 2017
- Succeeded by: Michelle Ballantyne (Note: Normally, regional MSPs do not have individual predecessors and successors. However, Hamilton retired from her seat during a sitting of parliament, so was succeeded by Ballantyne.)

Scottish Conservative Shadow portfolios
- Leader: Douglas Ross
- 2021–2024: Cabinet Secretary for Rural Affairs and Islands
- 2020–2021: Shadow Cabinet Secretary for Social Security and Older People

Personal details
- Born: Rachael Georgina Hamilton; 1970 (age 55–56) Brecon, Wales, UK
- Party: Scottish Conservatives
- Education: Harper Adams University (BSc)
- Occupation: Politician; agronomist
- Website: www.rachaelhamilton.co.uk

Rachael Georgina Hamilton (born 1970) is the Deputy Leader of the Scottish Conservative and Unionist Party, who has served as the Member of the Scottish Parliament (MSP) for Ettrick, Roxburgh and Berwickshire since 2017.

She was previously a list MSP for the South Scotland region, elected in the 2016 Scottish Parliament election. She was first elected as the constituency MSP for Ettrick, Roxburgh and Berwickshire at a 2017 by-election.

== Background ==
Hamilton was born in Brecon, Wales, and grew up on the family farm in Herefordshire. She was educated at an all-girls Catholic school in Wales.

She studied agriculture at Harper Adams University College in Shropshire and after graduating joined a graduate training programme to become an agronomist with Schering Agriculture.

When she was 18 she voted for the Green Party.

== Politics ==
=== Pre-election ===
Hamilton became campaign manager for Roxburgh and Berwickshire MSP John Lamont in 2008.

She first stood for election in 2013 during the Leaderdale and Melrose council by-election where she came second to Iain Gillespie of the Borders Party.

=== South Scotland MSP (2016 - 2017) ===
In 2016, Hamilton stood for the Scottish Parliament as the Conservative candidate for the East Lothian constituency, where she came third, then was elected from the South Scotland regional list.

=== Ettrick, Roxburgh and Berwickshire MSP (2017 - present) ===
Hamilton resigned her list seat to contest the 2017 Ettrick, Roxburgh and Berwickshire by-election on 8 June. She won the by-election with a majority of over 9,000.

Under the leadership of Ruth Davidson, Rachael Hamilton was Shadow Cabinet Secretary for Tourism and Small Business and was Deputy Chief Whip.

During Jackson Carlaw's leadership, Rachael Hamilton was Chairwoman of the Scottish Conservative Party and served as Shadow Cabinet Secretary for Rural Economy and Tourism.

In 2018, the Conservatives faced calls to sack Hamilton from the front bench after a hotel she co-owns with her husband was fined £52,500 by the DWP for failing to comply with the law on workplace pensions.

Under Scottish Conservative Leader, Douglas Ross, Hamilton served as Shadow Cabinet Secretary for Social Security and Older People and Shadow Cabinet Secretary for Equalities. She was part of the front bench team as Shadow Cabinet Secretary for Rural Affairs and Islands.

In the February 2020 Scottish Conservatives leadership election, Hamilton served as co-chair of Jackson Carlaw's leadership campaign, alongside Liam Kerr.

At the 2021 Scottish Parliament election, Hamilton was re-elected as the MSP for Ettrick, Roxburgh and Berwickshire, returning with over 51% of the vote. On 13 May 2021, at the swearing-in of the new session, Hamilton took the oath in the Welsh language.

During the sixth session of the Parliament she served, at various points, on the Rural Affairs and Equalities Committee. She strongly opposed the Gender Recognition Reform (Scotland) Bill, which sought to make it easier for Scots to change their legal gender.

In the 2026 Scottish Parliament election, Hamilton was again re-elected for the Ettrick, Roxburgh and Berwickshire - this time with 44.8% of the vote. This meant that the Scottish Conservatives continued to hold all three Scottish Parliament constituencies bordering England, which they dubbed the "Blue Wall".

Following the election, she was named the Conservative spokesperson for Business and Tourism in the Parliament.

=== Scottish Conservative Deputy Leader (2024 - present) ===
After Russell Findlay won the 2024 Scottish Conservative leadership election he appointed Hamilton as Deputy Leader of the party.

== Personal life ==
Hamilton has three daughters. She also has rheumatoid arthritis.

She is a director of the Buccleuch Arms Hotel in St Boswells.

== Notes ==
Scottish Parliament
Preceded by John Lamont	Member of the Scottish Parliament for Ettrick, Roxburgh and Berwickshire; 2017–present	Incumbent
