= 2017 Ettrick, Roxburgh and Berwickshire by-election =

Scottish by-election

- 8 June 2017

Ettrick, Roxburgh and Berwickshire
- Turnout: 69.8% (▲8.9 pp)
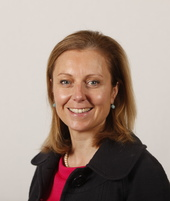

| | First party | Second party |
|---|---|---|
| Candidate | Rachael Hamilton | Gail Hendry |
| Party | Conservative | SNP |
| Popular vote | 20,658 | 11,320 |
| Percentage | 53.55% | 29.34% |
| Swing | ▼1.65 pp | ▼2.46 pp |
| | Third party | Fourth party |
| Candidate | Sally Prentice | Catriona Bhatia |
| Party | Labour | Liberal Democrats |
| Popular vote | 3,406 | 3,196 |
| Percentage | 8.83% | 8.28% |
| Swing | ▲3.53 pp | ▲0.58 pp |
MSP before election
John Lamont
Conservative
Elected MSP
Rachael Hamilton
Conservative

The 2017 Ettrick, Roxburgh and Berwickshire by-election was a by-election held on 8 June 2017 for the Scottish Parliament constituency of Ettrick, Roxburgh and Berwickshire. It was triggered by the resignation of John Lamont.

== Background ==
Conservative politician John Lamont was elected as MSP for the constituency at the 2016 election, having first been elected in 2007. Lamont announced on 25 April 2017 that he would be standing in the 2017 UK general election and submitted his resignation as MSP for Ettrick, Roxburgh and Berwickshire with effect from 4 May, which triggered a by-election. Ken Macintosh, the Presiding Officer scheduled the by-election for 8 June, the same date as the UK general election.

Four candidates were nominated: Conservative Rachael Hamilton, Gail Hendry for the Scottish National Party, Sally Prentice for Labour and Catriona Bhatia for the Liberal Democrats. Hamilton, who had been a regional MSP for South Scotland, resigned her seat in advance of the by-election.

== Result ==
The Scottish Conservatives held the seat with an increased majority.

2017 Ettrick, Roxburgh and Berwickshire by-election
| Party | Candidate | Votes | % | ±% |
|---|---|---|---|---|
| Conservative | Rachael Hamilton | 20,658 | 53.55 | −1.65 |
| SNP | Gail Hendry | 11,320 | 29.34 | −2.46 |
| Labour | Sally Prentice | 3,406 | 8.83 | +3.53 |
| Liberal Democrats | Catriona Bhatia | 3,196 | 8.28 | +0.58 |
| Majority | | 9,338 | 24.21 | +1.8 |
| Turnout | | 38,580 | 69.8 | |
| Conservative hold | | Swing | +0.4 | |

== 2016 election result ==
Scottish Parliament election, 2016: Ettrick, Roxburgh and Berwickshire
| Notes: | Blue background denotes the winner of the electorate vote. Pink background denotes a candidate elected from their party list. Yellow background denotes an electorate win by a list member, or other incumbent. A ✓ or ✗ denotes status of any incumbent, win or lose respectively. | | | | | | |
| Party | Candidate | Votes | % | ±% | Party votes | % | ±% |
|---|---|---|---|---|---|---|---|
| Conservative | ✓ John Lamont | 18,257 | 55.2 | +10.3 | 15,452 | 46.65 | +15.16 |
| SNP | Paul Wheelhouse | 10,521 | 31.8 | +5.4 | 10,068 | 30.40 | −4.45 |
| Liberal Democrats | Jim Hume | 2,551 | 7.7 | −9.6 | 2,851 | 8.61 | −6.14 |
| Labour | Barrie Cunning | 1,766 | 5.3 | −5.0 | 2,251 | 6.80 | −4.23 |
| Green | | | | | 1,481 | 4.47 | +1.11 |
| UKIP | | | | | 771 | 2.33 | +0.66 |
| Independent | | | | | 112 | | |
| RISE | | | | | 68 | | |
| Solidarity | | | | | 67 | | |
| Informal votes | | 88 | | | 68 | | |
| Total valid votes | | 33,095 | | | 33,121 | | |
| Conservative hold | Majority | 7,736 | 23.4 | +4.9 | | | |
