= Roxburgh and Berwickshire (UK Parliament constituency) =

UK Parliament constituency (1983–2005)

- Former county constituency for the House of Commons
- Boundary of Roxburgh and Berwickshire in Scotland for the 2001 general election

1983–2005
- Seats: One
- Created from: Roxburgh, Selkirk and Peebles and Berwick and East Lothian
- Replaced by: Berwickshire, Roxburgh & Selkirk

Roxburgh and Berwickshire was a county constituency of the House of Commons of the Parliament of the United Kingdom (Westminster) from 1983 to 2005. It elected one Member of Parliament (MP) by the first-past-the-post voting system.

== Boundaries ==
1983–1997: Roxburgh District, and Berwickshire District.

1997–2005: Roxburgh District, Berwickshire District, and the Ettrick and Lauderdale District electoral division of Scott's View.

The constituency was defined by the Third Periodical Review of the Boundary Commission for Scotland, and first used in the 1983 general election. The name of the constituency relates it to the Roxburgh and Berwickshire districts of the Borders region, which were created in 1975, under the Local Government (Scotland) Act 1973.

By the time of the Third Periodical Review, Scottish counties and burghs had been abolished by the same legislation which created regions and districts, and earlier constituencies had been defined by the Second Periodical Review, with reference to county and burgh boundaries, results being implemented for the February 1974 general election. The county of Roxburgh was covered by the Roxburgh, Selkirk and Peebles constituency, and the county of Berwick was covered by the Berwick and East Lothian constituency.

In 1996, under the Local Government etc (Scotland) Act 1994, regions and districts were abolished and the Scottish Borders council area was created with the boundaries of the former Borders region.

The results of the Fourth Periodical Review were implemented for the 1997 general election.

When the constituency was abolished, as a result of the Fifth Periodical Review, Berwickshire, Roxburgh and Selkirk was created, and first used in the 2005 general election, as one of six constituencies covering the Dumfries and Galloway, Scottish Borders, and South Lanarkshire council areas.

== Members of Parliament ==
Election	Member	Party
1983	Sir Archy Kirkwood	Liberal
1988	Sir Archy Kirkwood	Liberal Democrats
2005	constituency abolished	

== Election results ==
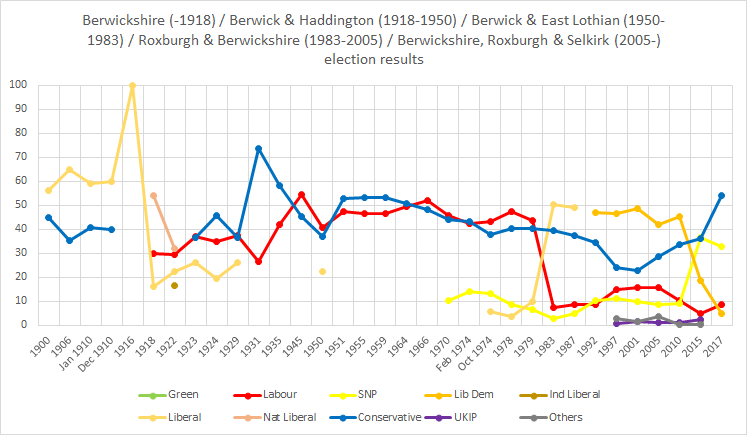
Berwickshire constituencies electoral history

=== Elections of the 1980s ===
General election 1983: Roxburgh and Berwickshire
Party	Candidate	Votes	%	±%
Liberal	Archy Kirkwood	15,920	50.3	+10.2
Conservative	Iain Sproat	12,524	39.6	−0.5
Labour	David Briggs	2,326	7.4	−5.6
SNP	Robert Shirley	852	2.7	−4.1
Majority		3,396	10.7	
Turnout		31,622	75.8	
Liberal win (new seat)				

General election 1987: Roxburgh and Berwickshire
Party	Candidate	Votes	%	±%
Liberal	Archy Kirkwood	16,388	49.2	−1.1
Conservative	Liam Fox	12,380	37.2	−2.4
Labour	Tim Luckhurst	2,944	8.8	+1.4
SNP	Marshall Douglas	1,586	4.8	+2.1
Majority		4,008	12.0	+1.3
Turnout		33,298	77.2	+1.4
Liberal hold		Swing		

=== Elections of the 1990s ===
General election 1992: Roxburgh and Berwickshire
Party	Candidate	Votes	%	±%
Liberal Democrats	Archy Kirkwood	15,852	46.9	−2.3
Conservative	Shirley Finlay-Maxwell	11,595	34.3	−2.9
SNP	Marshall Douglas	3,437	10.2	+5.4
Labour	Stephen Lambert	2,909	8.6	−0.2
Majority		4,257	12.6	+0.6
Turnout		33,793	77.6	+0.4
Liberal Democrats hold		Swing		

General election 1997: Roxburgh and Berwickshire
Party	Candidate	Votes	%	±%
Liberal Democrats	Archy Kirkwood	16,243	46.5	0.0
Conservative	Douglas Younger	8,337	23.9	−10.3
Labour	Helen Eadie	5,226	15.0	+6.2
SNP	Malcolm Balfour	3,959	11.3	+0.7
Referendum	John Curtis	922	2.6	New
UKIP	Peter Neilson	202	0.6	New
Natural Law	David Lucas	42	0.1	New
Majority		7,906	22.6	+10.0
Turnout		34,931	73.9	−3.7
Liberal Democrats hold		Swing		

=== Elections of the 2000s ===
General election 2001: Roxburgh and Berwickshire
Party	Candidate	Votes	%	±%
Liberal Democrats	Archy Kirkwood	14,044	48.8	+2.3
Conservative	George Turnbull	6,533	22.7	−1.2
Labour	Catherine Stuart	4,498	15.6	+0.6
SNP	Roderick Campbell	2,806	9.7	−1.6
Scottish Socialist	Amanda Millar	463	1.6	New
UKIP	Peter Neilson	453	1.6	+1.0
Majority		7,511	26.1	+3.5
Turnout		28,797	60.6	−13.3
Liberal Democrats hold		Swing		

== See also ==
- Roxburgh and Berwickshire (Scottish Parliament constituency)
