= Euan Robson =

Scottish politician (born 1954)

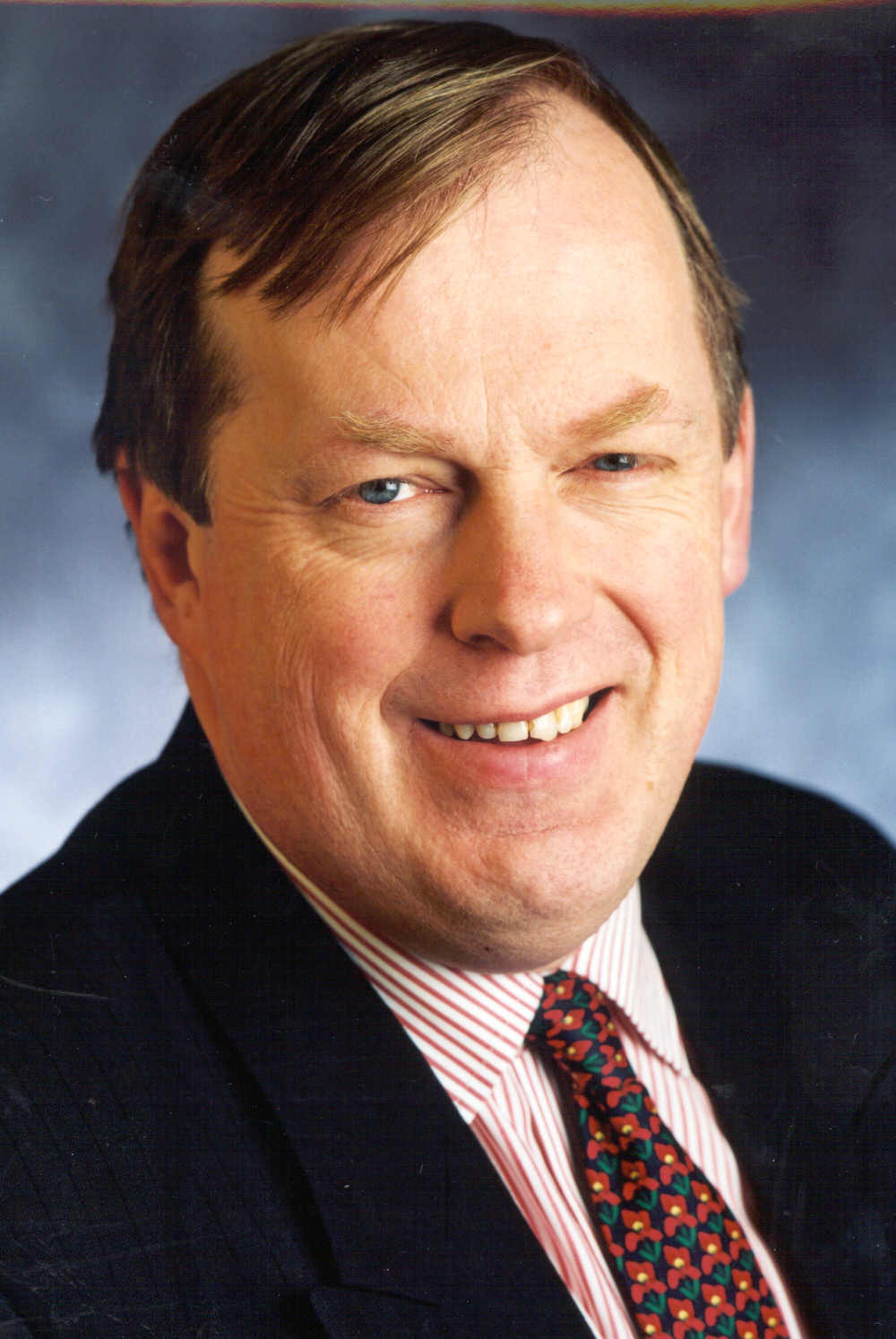

Member of the Scottish Parliament for Roxburgh and Berwickshire
- In office 6 May 1999 – 2 April 2007
- Preceded by: New Parliament
- Succeeded by: John Lamont

Personal details
- Born: 17 February 1954 (age 72)
- Party: Scottish Liberal Democrats

Euan Robson (born 17 February 1954) is a Scottish Liberal Democrat politician. He was the Member of the Scottish Parliament (MSP) for Roxburgh and Berwickshire from 1999 to 2007. He was defeated at the 2007 election by Conservative John Lamont.

He later stood as a Lib Dem candidate in Scotland at the 2009 European Parliament elections but was unsuccessful.

Robson is a councillor for the ward of Kelso and District on Scottish Borders Council.

Scottish Parliament
New parliament Scotland Act 1998	Member of the Scottish Parliament for Roxburgh and Berwickshire; 1999–2007	Succeeded by John Lamont
Political offices
Preceded by Nicol Stephen	Deputy Minister for Education and Young People; 2003–2005	Succeeded by Robert Brown
Preceded by Tavish Scott	Deputy Minister for Parliamentary Business; 2001–2003	Succeeded by Tavish Scott
