= Tweeddale, Ettrick and Lauderdale (UK Parliament constituency) =

UK Parliament constituency (1983–2005)

- Former county constituency for the House of Commons
- Boundary of Tweeddale, Ettrick and Lauderdale in Scotland for the 2001 general election

1983–2005
- Seats: One
- Created from: Roxburgh, Selkirk & Peebles, Berwick & East Lothian and Midlothian
- Replaced by: Berwickshire, Roxburgh & Selkirk; Midlothian; Dumfriesshire, Clydesdale & Tweeddale

Tweeddale, Ettrick and Lauderdale was a county constituency represented in the House of Commons of the Parliament of the United Kingdom from 1983. In 2005 the constituency was abolished and the area is now represented by Berwickshire, Roxburgh and Selkirk, Midlothian, and Dumfriesshire, Clydesdale and Tweeddale.

The Scottish Parliament constituency of Tweeddale, Ettrick and Lauderdale, which covered the same area, was in existence until the 2011 Scottish Parliament election.

== Boundaries ==
Formed for the 1983 election, the seat of Tweeddale, Ettrick and Lauderdale comprised the majority of the former Roxburgh, Selkirk and Peebles, with other areas coming in from Berwick and East Lothian and Midlothian. It was formed from the Tweeddale District, and the Ettrick and Lauderdale District. There were slight boundary changes in 1997, due to a local government boundary change in 1989.

== Members of Parliament ==
Election	Member	Party
1983	David Steel	Liberal
1988	David Steel	Liberal Democrat
1997	Michael Moore	Liberal Democrat

== Election results ==
=== Elections in the 1980s ===
General election 1983: Tweeddale, Ettrick and Lauderdale
Party	Candidate	Votes	%	±%
Liberal	David Steel	16,868	58.5	+10.5
Conservative	Alistair Ballantyne	8,329	28.9	−3.6
Labour	Michael Saren	2,200	7.4	−4.4
SNP	Allan Macartney	1,455	5.0	−2.1
Majority		8,539	29.6	+14.1
Turnout		28,852	77.8	
Liberal win (new seat)				

General election 1987: Tweeddale, Ettrick and Lauderdale
Party	Candidate	Votes	%	±%
Liberal	David Steel	14,599	49.9	−8.6
Conservative	Constance Finlay-Maxwell	8,657	29.6	+0.7
Labour	Neil Glen	3,320	11.4	+4.0
SNP	Andrew Lumsden	2,660	9.1	+4.1
Majority		5,942	20.3	−9.3
Turnout		29,236	77.2	−0.6
Liberal hold		Swing	−4.7	

=== Elections in the 1990s ===
General election 1992: Tweeddale, Ettrick and Lauderdale
Party	Candidate	Votes	%	±%
Liberal Democrats	David Steel	12,296	39.9	−10.0
Conservative	Lloyd Beat	9,776	31.7	+2.1
SNP	Christine Creech	5,244	17.0	+7.9
Labour	Alan Dunton	3,328	10.8	−0.6
Liberal	John Hein	177	0.6	New
Majority		2,520	8.2	−12.1
Turnout		30,821	78.0	+0.8
Liberal Democrats hold		Swing	-6.2	

General election 1997: Tweeddale, Ettrick and Lauderdale
Party	Candidate	Votes	%	±%
Liberal Democrats	Michael Moore	12,178	31.2	−3.8
Labour	Keith Geddes	10,689	27.4	+11.0
Conservative	Alister Jack	8,623	22.1	−8.6
SNP	Ian Goldie	6,671	17.1	−0.1
Referendum	Christopher Mowbray	406	1.0	New
Liberal	John Hein	387	1.0	+0.4
Natural Law	Duncan Paterson	47	0.1	New
Majority		1,489	3.8	−3.4
Turnout		39,001	76.3	−1.7
Liberal Democrats hold		Swing	-7.4	

=== Elections in the 2000s ===
General election 2001: Tweeddale, Ettrick and Lauderdale
Party	Candidate	Votes	%	±%
Liberal Democrats	Michael Moore	14,035	42.3	+11.1
Labour	Keith Geddes	8,878	26.7	−0.7
Conservative	Robert Brocklehurst	5,118	15.4	−6.7
SNP	Richard Thomson	4,108	12.4	−4.7
Scottish Socialist	Norman Lockhart	695	2.1	New
Liberal	John Hein	383	1.2	+0.2
Majority		5,157	15.6	+11.8
Turnout		33,217	63.4	−12.9
Liberal Democrats hold		Swing	+5.9	
