= Hawick and Hermitage (ward) =

Electoral ward in the Scottish Borders, Scotland

Location of the ward

Hawick and Hermitage is one of the eleven wards used to elect members of the Scottish Borders Council. It elects three Councillors.

== Councillors ==
Election	Councillors		
2007	David Paterson (Ind./ Alba)	George Turnbull (Conservative)	Ron Smith (Liberal Democrats)
2012	David Paterson (Ind./ Alba)	George Turnbull (Conservative)	Ron Smith (Liberal Democrats)
2017	David Paterson (Ind./ Alba)	George Turnbull (Conservative)	Watson McAteer (Ind.)
2021	David Paterson (Ind./ Alba)	George Turnbull (Conservative)	Watson McAteer (Ind.)
2022	Annette Smart (SNP)	Jane Cox (Conservative)	Watson McAteer (Ind.)

== Election results ==
=== 2022 Election ===
2022 Scottish Borders Council election

Hawick and Hermitage - 3 seats
Party	Candidate	FPv%	Count					
Party	Candidate	FPv%	1	2	3	4	5	6
Independent	Watson McAteer (incumbent)	48.5	1,477					
Conservative	Jane Cox	18.4	560	674.2	681.2	692.2	732.4	904.1
SNP	Annette Smart	16.7	509	565.2	607.9	638.3	671.6	765.4
Independent	Cameron Knox	6.3%	191	522.6	534.4	555.7	601.2	
Labour	Robert Leach	3.7	114	131.4	148.9			
Liberal Democrats	Rosemary Webster	3.7	113	153.2	162.6	202.4		
Green	Kevin Ferguson	2.7	81	101.8				
Electorate: 7,070 Valid: 3,045 Spoilt: 32 Quota: 762 Turnout: 43.5

=== 2017 Election ===
2017 Scottish Borders Council election

Hawick and Hermitage - 3 seats
Party	Candidate	FPv%	Count	
Party	Candidate	FPv%	1	2
Independent	Watson McAteer *	43.2%	1,496	
Conservative	George Turnbull (incumbent)	26.4%	912	
Independent	Davie Paterson (incumbent)	19.2%	665	936
SNP	Iain Whyte	11.2%	386	482
Electorate: 6,979 Valid: 3,459 Spoilt: 53 Quota: 865 Turnout: 50.3%

=== 2012 Election ===
2012 Scottish Borders Council election

Hawick and Hermitage - 3 seats
Party	Candidate	FPv%	Count						
Party	Candidate	FPv%	1	2	3	4	5	6	7
Independent	Davie Paterson (incumbent)	44.93	1,302						
Liberal Democrats	Ron Smith (incumbent)	18.12	525	676.1	687.7	706.4	785.2		
Conservative	George Turnbull (incumbent)	17.70	513	614	616.5	641.2	657.6	686.3	779.9
SNP	Tommy Stevenson	8.25	239	300.2	309.5	323.9	368.9	377.2	
Labour	Bill Cumming	6.59	191	246.8	258.4	270.3			
Borders	Frank Little	2.83	82	115.2	124.8				
Green	Kevin Ferguson	1.59	46	65.5					
Electorate: 7,041 Valid: 2,898 Spoilt: 34 Quota: 725 Turnout: 2,932 (41.16%)

=== 2007 Election ===
2007 Scottish Borders Council election

Scottish Borders council election, 2007: Hawick and Hermitage
Party	Candidate	FPv%	%	Seat	Count
Independent	David Paterson	1,022	25.8	1	1
Conservative	George Turnbull	953	24.1	2	4
SNP	Jim Rowan	674	17.0		
Liberal Democrats	Ron Smith	475	12.0	3	6
Liberal Democrats	Etta McKean	380	9.6		
Independent	Jake Irvine	324	8.2		
Green	Lesley Wood	126	3.2		
