= Mid Berwickshire (ward) =

Electoral ward in the Scottish Borders, Scotland

Location of the ward

Mid Berwickshire is one of the eleven wards used to elect members of the Scottish Borders Council. It elects three Councillors.

== Councillors ==
Election	Councillors		
2007	Donald Moffat (SNP)	Frances Renton (Liberal Democrats)	Trevor Jones (Conservative)
2012	Donald Moffat (SNP)	Frances Renton (Liberal Democrats)	John Greenwell (Conservative)
2017	Donald Moffat (SNP)	Mark Rowley (Conservative)	John Greenwell (Conservative)
2022	Donald Moffat (SNP)	Mark Rowley (Conservative)	John Greenwell (Conservative)

== Election results ==
=== 2022 Election ===
2022 Scottish Borders Council election

Mid Berwickshire - 3 seats
Party	Candidate	FPv%	Count						
Party	Candidate	FPv%	1	2	3	4	5	6	7
Conservative	John Greenwell (incumbent)	29.0	1,213						
SNP	Donald Moffat (incumbent)	25.8	1,079						
Conservative	Mark Rowley (incumbent)	17.1	715	842.8	844.3	891.1	919.3	942.4	1,162.9
Liberal Democrats	Yvonne Huggins-Haig	11.5	479	491.3	496.5	519.4	620.9	829.6	
Green	Gail Jackson	6.9	292	294.8	309.3	328.1	396.7		
Labour	David Smith	6.1	254	259.1	264.1	272.3			
Scottish Family	Hamish Goldie-Scot	3.5	146	148.4	149.6				
Electorate: 8,817 Valid: 4,178 Spoilt: 81 Quota: 1,045 Turnout: 48.3%

=== 2017 Election ===
2017 Scottish Borders Council election

Mid Berwickshire - 3 seats
Party	Candidate	FPv%	Count					
Party	Candidate	FPv%	1	2	3	4	5	6
Conservative	John Greenwell (incumbent)	35.1%	1,592					
Conservative	Mark Rowley	24.1%	1,096	1,434.3				
SNP	Donald Moffat (incumbent)	21.2%	962	983.2	995.3	1,022.9	1,124.7	1,435.7
Liberal Democrats	Frances Renton (incumbent)	11.9%	539	576.5	665	728.6	816.2	
Green	Pauline Stewart	3.9%	177	181	201	249		
Labour	David Smith	3.9%	175	180.4	199.8			
Electorate: 8,494 (Est.) Valid: 4,541 Spoilt: 96 Quota: 1,136 Turnout: 4,637 (54.6%)

=== 2012 Election ===
2012 Scottish Borders Council election

Mid Berwickshire - 3 seats
Party	Candidate	FPv%	Count				
Party	Candidate	FPv%	1	2	3	4	5
SNP	Donald Moffat (incumbent)	31.97	1,133				
Conservative	John Greenwell	21.46	747	768.9	1,085.9		
Liberal Democrats	Frances Renton (incumbent)	18.24	635	703.3	753.9	804.6	1,110.9
Borders	Tom Miers	15.34	534	598.5	635.3	688.3	
Conservative	Trevor Jones (incumbent)	12.41	432	446.6			
Electorate: 8,209 Valid: 3,481 Spoilt: 43 Quota: 871 Turnout: 3,524 (42.4%)

=== 2007 Election ===
2007 Scottish Borders Council election

Scottish Borders council election, 2007: Mid Berwickshire
Party	Candidate	FPv%	%	Seat	Count
Liberal Democrats	Frances Renton	1,186	27.0	1	1
SNP	Donald Moffat	1,173	26.7	2	1
Conservative	Trevor Jones	1,051	23.9	3	4
Conservative	Margaret McCrave	722	16.4		
Borders Party	Diana Miers	255	5.8		
Independent	Anne Roberts	105	2.4		
