= East Berwickshire (ward) =

Electoral ward in the Scottish Borders, Scotland

Location of the ward

East Berwickshire is one of the eleven wards used to elect members of the Scottish Borders Council. It elects three Councillors.

== Councillors ==
Election	Councillors		
2007	Jim Fullarton (Conservative)	David Raw (Liberal Democrats)	Michael Cook (Ind.)
2012	Jim Fullarton (Conservative)	Joan Umpherston Campbell (SNP)	Michael Cook (Ind.)
2017	Jim Fullarton (Conservative)	Helen Laing (SNP)	Carol Hamilton (Conservative)
2022	James Anderson (Ind.)	Aileen Orr (SNP)	Carol Hamilton (Conservative)

== Election results ==
=== 2022 Election ===
2022 Scottish Borders Council election

East Berwickshire - 3 seats
Party	Candidate	FPv%	Count							
Party	Candidate	FPv%	1	2	3	4	5	6	7	8
Conservative	Carol Hamilton (incumbent)	31.3	1,328							
SNP	Aileen Orr	21.2	899	901.2	904.2	995.2	1,078.8			
Independent	James Anderson	13.3	562	572.7	576.7	604.7	668.9	672.7	913.7	1,123.7
Independent	Raquel Lloyd-Jones	10.9	466	483.6	487.8	525.4	615.8	620.9		
Conservative	Lynda Jones	9.7	409	624.5	632.3	643.3	666.3	666.9	757.9	
Labour	Paul Stirton	6.9	296	299.8	300.8	355.2				
Green	Peter Guthrie	5.8	245	248.0	249.2					
Scottish Family	Edward Prentice	0.8	33	35.0						
Electorate: 9,029 Valid: 4,238 Spoilt: 49 Quota: 1,060 Turnout: 47.5

=== 2017 Election ===
2017 Scottish Borders Council election

East Berwickshire - 3 seats
Party	Candidate	FPv%	Count						
Party	Candidate	FPv%	1	2	3	4	5	6	7
Conservative	Jim Fullarton (incumbent)	35.6%	1,505						
Conservative	Carol Hamilton	23.1%	979	1,357					
SNP	Helen Laing	19.6%	831	835	841	893	932	1,001	1,203
Liberal Democrats	Danny Robertson	6.5%	276	296	352	398	475	627	
Labour	Eddy Coulson	7.1%	301	309	328	359	408		
Independent	Michael Clift	4.2%	178	185	233	259			
Green	Kate Duncan	3.8%	162	166	178				
Electorate: TBC Valid: 4,232 Spoilt: 66 Quota: 1,059 Turnout: 49.0%

=== 2012 Election ===
2012 Scottish Borders Council election

East Berwickshire - 3 seats
Party	Candidate	FPv%	Count						
Party	Candidate	FPv%	1	2	3	4	5	6	7
Independent	Michael Cook (incumbent)	35.96	1,236						
Conservative	Jim Fullarton (incumbent)	21.24	730	835.9	875.4				
SNP	Joan Umpherston Campbell	15.74	541	583.3	600.9	602.2	629.5	699	906.9
Labour	Kenryck Lloyd-Jones	12.66	435	472.1	485.9	486.6	521.9	596.9	
Liberal Democrats	Ken Webb	6.58	226	263.1	285.9	289.5	329		
Independent	Jack Johnston	3.96	136	192.9	226.9	229.7			
Borders	Cat MacDonald-Home	3.87	133	161.6					
Electorate: 8,383 Valid: 3,437 Spoilt: 37 Quota: 860 Turnout: 3,474 (41%)

=== 2007 Election ===
2007 Scottish Borders Council election

Scottish Borders council election, 2007: East Berwickshire
Party	Candidate	FPv%	%	Seat	Count
Independent	Michael Cook	1,512	34.8	1	1
Conservative	Jim Fullarton	1,333	30.6	2	1
Liberal Democrats	David Raw	804	18.5	3	3
SNP	Aileen Orr	701	16.1		
