= Roxburgh and Berwickshire (Scottish Parliament constituency) =

- Former county constituency for the Scottish Parliament
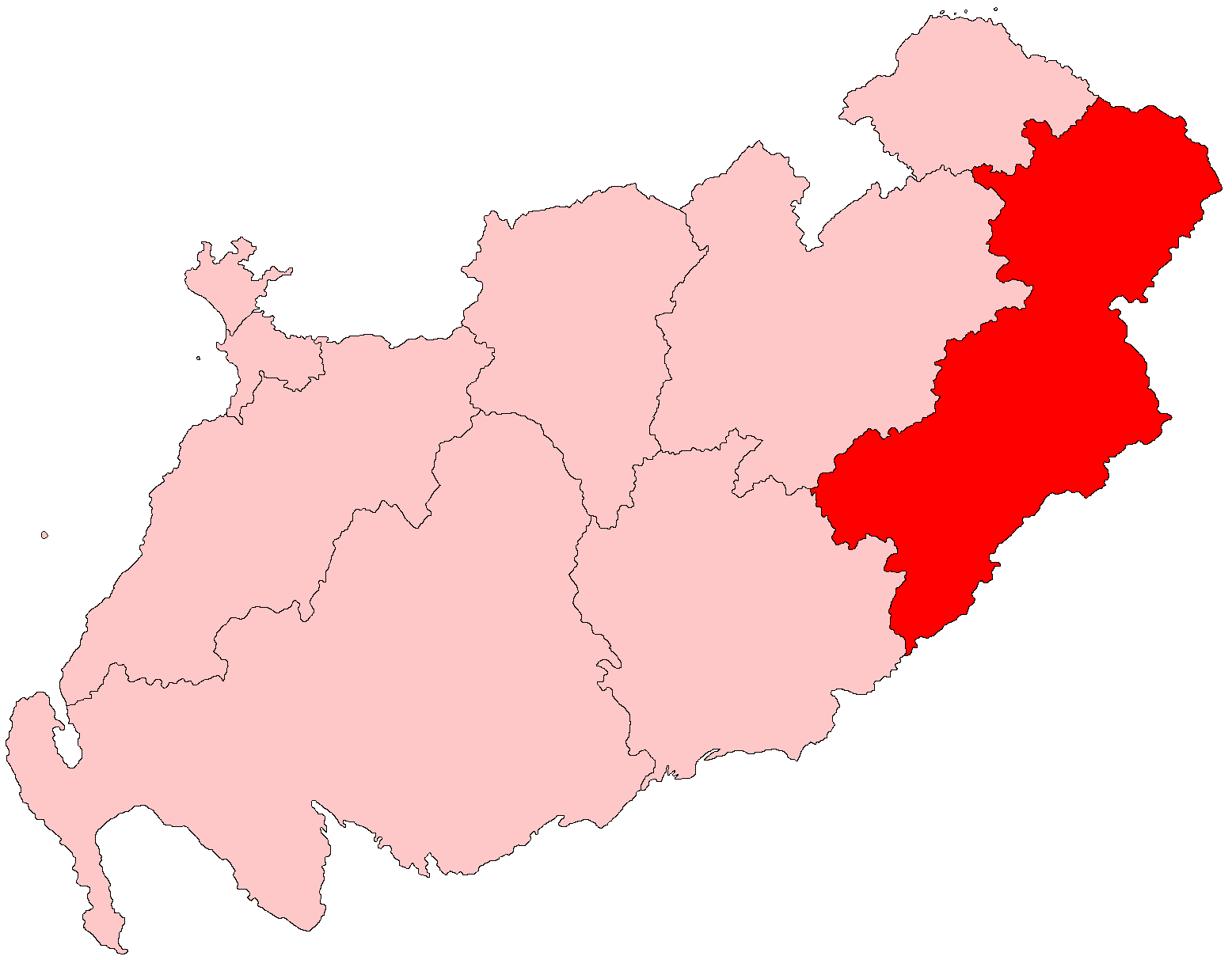

- Roxburgh and Berwickshire shown within the South of Scotland electoral region and the region shown within Scotland

Former constituency
- Created: 1999
- Abolished: 2011
- Council area: Scottish Borders
- Replaced by: Ettrick, Roxburgh and Berwickshire

Roxburgh and Berwickshire was a constituency of the Scottish Parliament until 2011. It elected one Member of the Scottish Parliament (MSP) by the plurality (first past the post) method of election. It was also one of nine constituencies in the South of Scotland electoral region, which elects seven additional members, in addition to nine constituency MSPs, to produce a form of proportional representation for the region as a whole.

== Electoral region ==
The other eight constituencies of the South of Scotland region were: Ayr, Carrick, Cumnock and Doon Valley, Clydesdale, Cunninghame South, Dumfries, East Lothian, Galloway and Upper Nithsdale and Tweeddale, Ettrick and Lauderdale.

The region covered the Dumfries and Galloway council area, the Scottish Borders council area, the South Ayrshire council area, part of the East Ayrshire council area, part of the East Lothian council area, part of the Midlothian council area, part of the North Ayrshire council area and part of the South Lanarkshire council area.

== Constituency boundaries and council area ==
The Roxburgh and Berwickshire constituency was created at the same time as the Scottish Parliament, in 1999, with the name and boundaries of an existing Westminster constituency. In 2005, however, Scottish Westminster constituencies were mostly replaced with new constituencies.

The Holyrood constituency covered an eastern portion of the Scottish Borders council area. The rest of the council area was covered by the Tweeddale, Ettrick and Lauderdale constituency, which also covered a western portion of the Midlothian council area.

== Boundary review ==
Following its First Periodic review of constituencies to the Scottish Parliament, the Boundary Commission for Scotland recommended that the Roxburgh and Berwickshire seat be expanded to form the newly shaped Ettrick, Roxburgh and Berwickshire constituency in time for the 2011 election.

== Member of the Scottish Parliament ==
Election	Member	Party
1999	Euan Robson	Liberal Democrats
2007	John Lamont	Conservative
2011	constituency abolished: replaced by Ettrick, Roxburgh and Berwickshire	

== Election results ==
2007 Scottish Parliament election: Roxburgh and Berwickshire
Party	Candidate	Votes	%	±%
Conservative	John Lamont	10,556	41.1	+10.9
Liberal Democrats	Euan Robson	8,571	33.4	−7.8
SNP	Aileen Orr	4,127	16.1	+3.6
Labour	Mary Lockhart	2,108	8.2	−4.3
Independent	Jesse Rae	318	1.2	New
Majority		1,985	7.7	N/A
Turnout		26,279		
Conservative gain from Liberal Democrats		Swing		

2003 Scottish Parliament election: Roxburgh and Berwickshire
Party	Candidate	Votes	%	±%
Liberal Democrats	Euan Robson	9,280	41.2	+0.6
Conservative	Sandy Scott	6,790	30.2	+2.4
SNP	Roderick Campbell	2,816	12.5	−4.4
Labour	Sam Held	2,802	12.5	−2.2
Scottish Socialist	Graeme McIver	823	3.7	New
Majority		2,490	11.0	−1.8
Turnout		22,511		
Liberal Democrats hold		Swing	-0.9	

1999 Scottish Parliament election: Roxburgh and Berwickshire
Party	Candidate	Votes	%	±%
Liberal Democrats	Euan Robson	11,320	40.6	N/A
Conservative	Alasdair Hutton	7,735	27.8	N/A
SNP	Stuart Crawford	4,719	16.9	N/A
Labour	Susan McLeod	2,802	14.7	N/A
Majority		3,585	12.8	N/A
Turnout		26,500		N/A
Liberal Democrats win (new seat)				

== See also ==
- Roxburgh and Berwickshire (UK Parliament constituency)
