= 2026 in Scotland =

- Centuries: 19th; 20th; 21st
- Decades: 2000s; 2010s; 2020s
- See also: List of years in Scotland; Timeline of Scottish history 2026 in: The UK • England • Wales • Elsewhere; Scottish football: 2025–26 • 2026–27; 2026 in Scottish television

Events from the year 2026 in Scotland.

== Incumbents ==
- First Minister – John Swinney
- Secretary of State – Douglas Alexander

== Events ==
=== January ===
- 1 January –
  - Major reforms to Scotland's justice system, including scrapping the not proven verdict, come into force.
  - The Met Office issues an amber weather warning for heavy snow in parts of northern Scotland for Friday 2 January and Saturday 3 January.
- 2 January – Heavy snow causes disruption, including train cancellations to and from Thurso.
- 4 January – A new amber weather alert for heavy snow comes into force for northern Scotland, starting at 6pm and lasting until 10am on Monday 5 January. A number of schools in Aberdeenshire, Shetland and Orkney due to return from the Christmas holiday postpone their reopening, while schools in Aberdeen are scheduled to have a late start.
- 5 January –
  - First Minister John Swinney proposes 15 June 2026 as a national bank holiday to coincide with Scotland's first World Cup match since 1998, which will occur on 14 June when they play Haiti.
  - Fresh warning for ice and snow covering all of Scotland are issued for Tuesday 6 January.
  - Wilfried Nancy resigns as manager of Celtic F.C. after losing six of the eight games he has presided over since taking up the role in December. Former manager Martin O'Neill returns for the remainder of the season.
- 6 January –
  - Aberdeenshire Council declares a major incident following several days of heavy snow in north east Scotland.
  - A Parliamentary investigation finds that Justice Secretary Angela Constance broke the ministerial code after making controversial comments about a grooming gangs expert in parliament.
  - The Scottish Parliament confirms that MSPs will receive a 4.3% pay rise from April, taking their annual income from £74,507 to £77,710.
  - Launch date of STV Radio, with Ewen Cameron and Cat Harvey presenting the weekday breakfast show.
- 7 January –
  - Plans for a new Scottish Dark Sky Observatory are submitted more than four years after the old one was destroyed by fire.
  - Plans are unveiled to add a public hall to the east wing of Dumfries House in Cumnock, East Ayrshire, which currently serves as the headquarters of the King's Foundation. The venue would be hired out for weddings.
- 8 January –
  - MSPs vote 65–54 in favour of the Building Safety Levy (Scotland) Bill, which proposes raising about £30m in tax on housebuilding.
  - Several thousand starfish are unexplainedly washed up at Wardie Bay in Granton, where they are discovered by swimmers.
- 9 January –
  - Resident doctors in Scotland call off a planned four-day strike, scheduled to begin on Tuesday 13 January, following a renewed pay offer, which will be put to British Medical Association members via a ballot.
  - Stella Maris, the rector of St Andrews University, is removed from her role as president of the university court for allegedly failing to follow governance rules.
  - Storm Goretti: As the north and northeast of Scotland experience their ninth day of snow, a further yellow alert for snow is issued covering Saturday 10 January and Sunday 11 January.
- 10 January – The severe weather warning for Scotland is upgraded to amber with more snow expected on Sunday 11 January.
- 11 January – Heavy rain and melting snow bring flooding to parts of Scotland as temperatures rise following a week of cold weather.
- 12 January – Thomas Craig, who tried to kill another man on a train with a smashed glass bottle, is sentenced to 12 years in prison.
- 13 January – Finance Secretary Shona Robison delivers the 2026 Scottish budget, which includes changes to tax thresholds, an increase in taxation on residential properties worth over £1m and an increase in the Scottish Child Payment.
- 15 January – Malcolm Offord is announced as the leader of Reform UK in Scotland.
- 16 January – A £50m lawsuit against the Scottish Government over its failed deposit return scheme (DRS) is rejected following a legal hearing.
- 19 January – Scottish singer-songwriter Jacob Alon is named as the winner of the 2026 Brits Critics' Choice Award.
- 20 January – Liridon Kastrati is sentenced to ten years in prison for the attempted murder of a police officer whom he chased with a chainsaw in Paisley, Renfrewshire, in May 2024.
- 21 January – The Met Office issues an amber weather warning for heavy rain for parts of Scotland, which is in place from midnight on 22 January until 4pm on the same day.
- 23 January –
  - At a hearing at Glasgow Court of Justiciary, Ethan O'Kane is sentenced to six and a half years in prison over his part in an April 2023 attack on former housing association chairman John McLardie, who died several months after striking his head on the pavement in Glasgow.
  - Water bills in Scotland will rise by 8.7% from April, an average of £42 a year.
- 24 January – Heavy rain causes disruption in the Central Belt, with a yellow weather warning for further rain in north eastern Scotland on Sunday 25 January.
- 26 January –
  - Scottish Conservative councillor for Dunoon ward Daniel Hampsey defects to Reform UK.
  - An inquest into the death of former Scotland and Manchester United footballer Gordon McQueen rules it is likely that repeatedly heading the ball led to his brain damage and eventual death.
- 27 January – Brewdog announces it is to stop making spirits at its distillery in Aberdeenshire.
- 30 January – Tesco says it has suspended its use of a salmon farm in Skye following reports from an animal welfare charity that diseased fish were dumped into a sea loch and that five salmon were left to suffocate before they were processed.

=== February ===
- 1 February – Sandy Brindley, the founder and chief executive of Rape Crisis Scotland, announces she will step down from the post after 24 years.
- 2 February –
  - The Scottish Government says it will not support the Prostitution (Offences and Support) (Scotland) Bill, a bill tabled by Independent MSP Ash Regan that would criminalise payment for sex.
  - The Met Office issues a yellow weather warning for fresh snowfall and high winds, which is in force from midnight on Monday 2 February until 3pm on Wednesday 4 February.
- 3 February – MSPs reject the Prostitution (Offences and Support) (Scotland) Bill by 64 votes to 54.
- 5 February –
  - The King grants Scotland a one-off extra Bank Holiday for Monday 15 June to coincide with Scotland's first FIFA World Cup match since 1998, which takes place the day before.
  - Fashion retailer Quiz enters administration for the third time in six years, with 109 jobs at risk.
  - MSPs back the Non-surgical Procedures and Functions of Medical Reviewers (Scotland) Bill, which would see the introduction of restrictions on cosmetic procedures including botox injections and non-surgical Brazilian butt lifts.
- 6 February – Nicola Christiano, a man who attempted to rape a female passenger on an easyJet flight from Naples to Edinburgh in May 2025, is sentenced to six years in prison.
- 10 February –
  - Scottish Labour removes the party whip from MSP Pam Duncan-Glancy while it investigates her links with a convicted sex offender.
  - The Scottish Government has paid around £400,000 to the campaign group For Women Scotland after it lost a legal case brought by the group over the definition of a woman.
  - Newspaper publisher Reach announces the closure of its Glasgow printing works, with the loss of 100 jobs, with operations to be transferred to Oldham in Lancashire.
- 11 February –
  - Pay increases of 10% to executives at NHS Lothian and NHS Greater Glasgow are suspended following a backlash by unions.
  - Scottish rocket manufacturer Orbex announces its intention to appoint administrators after failing to secure funding, a merger or a buyer.
- 12 February – Aberdeen's longest period without sunshine since records began comes to an end, with the last sunny period in the city recorded on 21 January.
- 13 February –
  - It emerges that former Scottish National Party chief executive Peter Murrell is to face charges of embezzling £459,000 from the party over a period of twelve years.
  - The return of the MV Glen Sannox, which has been out of action for three months, is delayed for a further week because of a fault with its anchor mechanism.
- 14 February –
  - It is reported that the Scottish Government is taking legal action against 250 dentists for not treating enough patients after receiving bursaries.
  - 2026 Six Nations Championship: Scotland defeat England 31–20 at Murrayfield to win the Calcutta Cup.
- 15 February – It is reported that transgender doctor Beth Upton, who was at the centre of the Peggie v NHS Fife legal case, has stopped working for the NHS.
- 17 February – Appeal judges overturn Scottish Government approval of the Wull Muir windfarm in the Borders region, which has been rejected on three previous occasions.
- 19 February – Two people are rescued and a third dies following a joint operation with Police Scotland and mountain rescue on An Teallach, Wester Ross.
- 20 February – Scottish Water warns the residents of the Perthshire village of Killin not to use tap water for anything but flushing the toilet after an attempted fuel theft at a petrol station lead to contamination of a local water treatment works.
- 21 February –
  - Kenny MacAskill, leader of the Alba Party, says the party is unlikely to contest the 2026 Scottish Parliament election because of its "perilous financial situation".
  - Two people are killed following a single-vehicle crash on the A830 near Fort William.
- 22 February – Tommy Sheridan, Angus MacNeil, Christina Hendry and Suzanne Blackley issue a joint statement in which they offer to take over leadership of the Alba Party to ensure it can contest the 2026 Scottish Parliament election.
- 24 February – MSPs reject the Scottish Parliament (Recall and Removal of Members) Bill, which would have introduced a recall system for MPs suspended from parliament for ten days or longer.
- 25 February –
  - MSPs vote 66–29 to approve the £68bn 2026 Scottish budget, which includes changes to income tax rates and levies on properties.
  - The Scottish Government orders an inquiry into grooming gangs.
  - Former leader of the Scottish Conservatives, Douglas Ross, is banned from Holyrood for a day for questioning the impartiality of the Presiding Officer.
  - Former gamekeeper David Campbell is found guilty of the murder of Brian Low, a colleague who he shot dead on a path in Highland Perthshire in February 2024, before attempting to cover his tracks.

=== March ===
- 3 March – Transport Secretary Fiona Hyslop announces that Ardrossan Harbour will be taken into public ownership.
- 4 March –
  - Members of the Educational Institute of Scotland vote to take strike action over teachers' workloads.
  - Sally Donald, an SNP candidate in the forthcoming Scottish Parliament election, stands down after it emerges she is being investigated for benefit fraud.
- 7 March – Iran war: First Minister John Swinney says he is willing to consider banning US military aircraft from using Prestwick Airport if they are taking part in airstrikes on the Middle East.
- 8 March –
  - A man dies outside the UK's first drug consumption room in Glasgow.
  - Police Scotland make nine arrests after fans and police officers are injured during a pitch invasion at Ibrox stadium following a football match between Celtic and Rangers.
  - Union Street fire: Fire breaks out in a vape shop adjacent to Glasgow Central railway station, closing the station to rail services for several days.
  - Kenny MacAskill announces that the Alba Party will be wound down due to its "dire financial plight".
- 11 March –
  - The Educational Institute of Scotland reaches a deal with the Scottish Government that could avoid strikes in six council areas over a long-running dispute, but the deal must first be ratified by Cosla.
  - Andrea Manson resigns as convener of Shetland Islands Council two weeks after being banned as a company director over unpaid tax.
- 12 March –
  - Fiona McQueen resigns as chairwoman of the Scottish Police Authority.
  - A review finds that Scottish Parliament staff have reported 84 cases of bullying, Harassment or sexual harassment since 2021.
- 13 March –
  - Union Street fire: Glasgow City Council begins demolition work on the B-listed Victorian Union Corner building next to Glasgow Central railway station following the fire which left it in a dangerous state, with Network Rail saying that the railway station will be closed until at least Wednesday 18 March.
  - Serenity Francis Johnston, a transgender woman who carried out sex attacks, including rape, against a number of young girls, is sentenced to nine years in prison.
  - A project to restore the Kalemouth Suspension Bridge over the River Teviot in the Scottish Borders receives £250,000 of National Lottery Heritage Funding.
  - A man is killed following a collision between two cars and a motorcycle on the B4074 in South Ayrshire.
- 14 March – A man is fatally injured during a collision between two vehicles on the A92 road in Fife.
- 17 March – MSPs vote 69–57 against legalising assisted dying in Scotland.
- 18 March –
  - Glasgow Central railway station partially reopens following the Union Street fire.
  - Liam McArthur, whose bill to allow assisted dying in Scotland, was defeated in the previous day's Scottish Parliament vote, rules out reintroducing it after the 2026 election.
  - Work begins on the construction of Scotland's first Center Parcs holiday village near Hawick.
  - MSPs vote to approve the Prohibition of Greyhound Racing (Scotland) Bill, outlawing greyhound racing in Scotland, 24 hours after the Welsh Senedd passed similar legislation.
- 19 March –
  - A man is fatally injured after being hit by a vehicle on the M80 motorway near Falkirk.
  - Police are treating the death of Joanne Newlands, who was discovered at a block of flats in Glasgow on 17 March, as murder.
- 20 March – Stuart Niven, announced as a Reform UK candidate for the 2026 Holyrood election the previous day, is suspended from the party following reports he was disqualified as a company director.
- 21 March – A 51-year-old cyclist is fatally injured after being involved in a crash with a car on the B9074 on Shetland.
- 22 March –
  - Glasgow Central railway station's Hope Street exit will reopen following demolition work to a building affected by the Union Street fire.
  - Specialist members of the armed forces are to be called in to assist police in a fresh search for the remains of mother and son Renee and Andrew MacRae, who disappeared 50 years ago.
- 23 March –
  - Scotland becomes the first part of the UK to test newborn babies for Spinal Muscular Atrophy.
  - The UK government announces a £9m investment in new projects at the former Mossmorran ethylene plant.
  - The Argyll and Bute Council Harbour Board gives the go-ahead for a new ferry to Jura following £19m of investment from the Scottish Government.
- 24 March –
  - MSPs pass legislation on the restraint and seclusion of school children, requiring the Scottish Government to issue guidelines on the matter.
  - Malcolm Offord, Reform UK's leader in Scotland, apologises for making a homophobic remark about George Michael at a Burns Night supper.
- 25 March –
  - Glasgow Central railway station will reopen all of its platforms following its closure because of the Union Street fire.
  - Reform UK's sole MSP, Graham Simpson, gives his backing to Malcolm Offord following the previous day's reports concerning a homophobic joke.
  - Raymond Munro, who killed a pedestrian while speeding at 91 mph, is sentenced to four years in custody.
- 26 March –
  - Jordan Linden, the former leader of North Lanarkshire Council, is found guilty of sexually assaulting five men.
  - A stone slab marking a visit to Alloa by Andrew Mountbatten-Windsor is removed after a 20 March vote by Clackmannanshire councillors to have it uninstalled.
  - Riverside Park officially opens in Govan, Glasgow, transforming part of the long-derelict former graving docks into accessible public space and restoring, for the first time in nearly four decades, direct community access to the south bank of the River Clyde, marking a major milestone in Glasgow's waterfront regeneration.
- 29 March –
  - Scottish gangland figure Steven Lyons is arrested at an immigration checkpoint on the Indonesian island of Bali. It emerges the following day that his partner, Amanda Lyons, was arrested in Dubai at the same time.
  - Amanda Dwyer wins the 2026 Sir Billy Connolly "Spirit of Glasgow" award at the city's comedy festival.
- 31 March – Bus manufacturer Alexander Dennis announces proposals to close its Falkirk factory with the loss of 115 jobs.

=== April ===
- 1 April –
  - Scottish Labour drops Mohammed Ameen, its candidate for Glasgow Southside, after he was charged with fraud.
  - North Lanarkshire councillor and SNP parliamentary candidate Tracy Carragher is suspended from the party after she was criticised for her handling of complaints about former council leader Jordan Linden, who was convicted of sexually assaulting young men.
- 2 April – An 83-year-old man is fatally injured during a car crash at Burra, Shetland.
- 3 April – Police end their latest search for the bodies of Renee and Andrew MacRae.
- 6 April – The MV Glen Sannox is taken out of service again because of an ongoing problem with its engine.
- 7 April –
  - Margaret Cassidy, who stole £317,475 from an elderly aunt in order to convert an old church into a gym, is sentenced to two and a half years in prison.
  - A lost painting by Joan Eardley, which was found in a charity shop, sells at auction for £29,500.
- 8 April – Crime boss Stephen Lyons is deported from Bali to Amsterdam.
- 10 April –
  - Lee Milne, who was convicted of the culpable homicide of his wife Kimberly after she jumped from a motorway bridge in 2023 following a campaign of domestic abuse, is sentenced to eight years in prison. The case is the first prosecution of its kind in Scotland.
  - The Category B-listed Boleskine House opens to the public following a seven-year renovation.
  - Edinburgh City Council's plan to charge the owners of second homes 300% council tax is delayed while amendments to the rule are considered.
- 12 April – Two men are taken to hospital after a bus crashes down an embankment on the A9 north of Aviemore in the Highlands.
- 13 April – Police have begun a search for Justin Evans, a 24-year-old monk who has been missing from the Golgotha Monastery on Papa Stronsay for two days.
- 15 April – Jamie Murray announces his retirement from professional tennis.
- 16 April –
  - About 15,000 customers of car dealership company Arnold Clark are given legal permission to pursue a compensation claim against the firm over a data breach in 2022.
  - First Minister John Swinney announces that the price of essential foods would be legally capped if the Scottish National Party wins the 2026 Scottish Parliament election.
  - Team Scotland condemns online racism directed at the models chosen to showcase the team's 2026 Commonwealth Games opening ceremony outfit following several comments accusing them of not being Scottish.
  - Organisers of Paisley Alive, a one-day festival combining music with fitness sessions, scheduled for 4 July, cancel the event due to low ticket sales.
- 17 April – Two men are killed after a head-on motorway crash on the M90 near Kinross.
- 18 April – Police launch a murder investigation after an 82-year-old woman, later named as Elizabeth Colligan, is found fatally injured on a Glasgow street in the early hours.
- 19 April –
  - Former Scottish Labour leader Kezia Dugdale is appointed as chairwoman of Stonewall, and will take up the post in September.
  - The Police Investigations and Review Commissioner is to investigate the circumstances of a head-on crash on the M90 that killed two people after it emerges that a marked police car was involved in the pursuit of one of the vehicles.
- 21 April –
  - A man is arrested in connection with the death of Elizabeth Colligan. He is subsequently charged with her murder and remanded in custody.
  - Organisers of GlasGael, an Irish music festival planned for Glasgow Green on 2–3 May, postpone the event until 2027, citing rising costs triggered by world events that made it financially unviable.
- 23 April –
  - The Home Office confirms that Ghanaian "King Atehene" Kofi Offeh, who led the self-proclaimed Kingdom of Kubala in the Scottish Borders near Jedburgh, has been deported from the UK.
  - At a hearing at Aberdeen Sheriff Court, a 15-year-old girl pleads guilty to a knife attack on a 12-year-old girl at a school in Aberdeen.
  - The Scottish Fire and Rescue Service and Scottish Wildfire Forum issue a series of wildfire warnings for Scotland.
- 25 April –
  - A six-year-old girl is killed after she is hit by a car on a street in Paisley, Renfrewshire.
  - The cast and crew of BBC One Scotland's soap River City film the series' final scenes after 24 years on air.
- 26 April – BBC News reports that firefighters have tackled a series of wildfires across Scotland.
- 29 April –
  - Nicole Blain, whose 19-day-old daughter died of catastrophic injuries at their Greenock home in 2023, and who tried to blame another child for the death, is found guilty of murder.
  - The BBC confirms that Radio 2 in the Park, scheduled to take place at City Park, Stirling from 7–9 August, will be rescheduled to September to avoid it clashing with local events.
- 30 April –
  - Drug gang boss Stephen "Jimmy" Jamieson is sentenced to six years in prison following extradition to Scotland from Dubai.
  - A teenager dies after getting into trouble in the River Nith at Dumfries.

=== May ===
- 1 May – Drug driver Kane Farragher, who killed his girlfriend, Taylor Jenkins, in a head-on motorway crash while being pursued by police on 1 March, is sentenced to twelve years and six months in prison.
- 2 May – A male cyclist is taken to hospital after being involved in a crash with a bus in Glasgow city centre.
- 4 May –
  - Data from the Scottish Prison Service indicates 614 prisoners have been released early since November, but prisoner numbers remain high, with 8,456 people in prison on 1 May.
  - Police are investigating a social media post by the Scottish Palestine Solidarity Campaign depicting Jewish actress Maureen Lipman with devil horns and a pitchfork.
- 5 May – South Ayrshire Council apologises after sending out polling cards in envelopes that incorrectly say photo identification will be needed to vote in the 2026 Scottish Parliament election.
- 6 May –
  - NHS Lothian confirms that 16 people have fallen ill after attending a petting farm in Edinburgh.
  - Former council leader Jordan Linden is sentenced to 18 months in prison for sexually assaulting five young men.
- 7 May –
  - 2026 Scottish Parliament election
  - More than 100 firefighters, and 22 appliances, are sent to tackle a fire at a shop in Rutherglen.
- 8 May – Journalists and some technical staff at STV stage a 24-hour strike over a pay freeze.
- 10 May – Police are treating the stabbing of two men at a retail park in Stirling the previous evening as attempted murder.
- 12 May – UK Prime Minister Keir Starmer speaks to Scotland's first minister, John Swinney, to congratulate him on his election win, and agrees to discuss the constitution with Swinney.
- 13 May – Prince Edward, Duke of Edinburgh joins MSPs for the traditional Kirking of the parliament at Edinburgh's St Giles' Cathedral.
- 14 May –
  - Public Health Scotland says that a small number of Scots have been linked to the 2026 hantavirus outbreak and are self-isolating.
  - MSPs are sworn in for the 7th Scottish Parliament, and Ayrshire MSP Kenneth Gibson is elected as Presiding Officer.
- 16 May – Trouble erupts following Celtic F.C.'s Scottish Premiership win over Heart of Midlothian F.C., resulting in 14 arrests and two police officers sustaining injuries.
- 17 May – The Rt Rev Gordon Kennedy, Moderator of the General Assembly of the Church of Scotland, reads an apology for the Church's role in slavery. He is joined by delegates from Nigeria, Ghana and Jamaica for the occasion.
- 19 May – MSPs vote to re-appoint John Swinney as Scotland's first minister.
- 20 May – Swinney unveils his new eight-person cabinet.
- 21 May –
  - Kenneth Gibson, the new Presiding Officer of the Scottish Parliament, announces that First Minister's Questions will increase from one to two sessions a week, with a second 30-minute session occurring on a Tuesday in addition to the Thursday session.
  - Gordon Street in Glasgow City Centre reopens following the Union Street fire.
- 22 May – A motorcyclist is killed after his vehicle is in collision with a van on the A911 in Fife.
- 24 May – Deputy First Minister Jenny Gilruth tells the BBC's The Sunday Show there will "undoubtedly" need to be cuts as Scotland will face a shortfall of £5bn by the end of the decade.
- 25 May – Former SNP chief executive Peter Murrell pleads guilty to embezzling more than £400,000 from the party and is remanded in custody to await sentence.
- 26 May – MSPs endorse a Scottish Government call for the UK government to hold a Second Scottish independence referendum after the policy receives backing from the SNP and the Greens.
- 27 May – The A9 is closed temporarily after fire crews are called to an incident when a Tesco delivery lorry burst into flames in Perth and Kinross.
- 28 May –
  - First Minister John Swinney rejects calls for a Scottish Parliament inquiry into former SNP chief executive Peter Murrell.
  - A woman is sentenced to life imprisonment with a minimum term of 19 years for the murder of her 19-day old daughter. She had pleaded guilty to the offence at a previous hearing in April.
- 29 May –
  - Migrant hotel resident Muhammad Sheikhi is found guilty of sexually assaulting two women in the Falkirk area, and remanded in custody pending sentence on 29 June.
  - A motorcyclist is taken to hospital with critical injuries after colliding with a double-decker bus on the A92 in Angus.
- 30 May – Two arrests are made and dozens of offences identified by police during a "meet-up" of 700 cars at an Asda car park in Aberdeen.

=== June ===
- 1 June – Ofcom approves STV's plan to axe its separate news programme for the north of Scotland.
- 4 June –
  - A 17-year-old youth is sentenced to life imprisonment with a minimum term of 17 years for the murder of John McNab, who was stabbed to death in Leith on 2 September 2025 while the youth was on bail for a previous knife attack.
  - Glasgow City Council announce that the Queen's Park Glasshouse will close permanently in August.
- 5 June –
  - Two teenagers are found guilty of the murder of Kayden Moy, a 16-year-old killed on a beach in Ayrshire in 2025 following a row between rival gangs.
  - A judge rules that West Lothian Council acted unlawfully by failing to provide single-sex toilet facilities at a newly constructed primary school
- 6 June – A man is fatally injured and two other people taken to hospital following a collision between a car and a van on the A709 in Dumfries and Galloway.
- 8 June –
  - The Scottish Medicines Consortium announces that the weight loss injection Wegovy will be made available free to NHS patients in Scotland who are at risk of heart attack or stroke.
  - The year's first case of American foulbrood, a disease affecting bees, is found in Kincardineshire.
- 9 June – RSPB Scotland announces that it has purchased Bass Rock in the Firth of Forth, home to the UK's largest northern gannet colony.
- 10 June –
  - Three people are arrested and charged following violent disorder in Glasgow after a stabbing incident in Belfast.
  - The Scottish Parliament rejects a call for an inquiry into former SNP chief executive Peter Murrell in favour of a wider inquiry into the financing of political parties.
  - Stacey Balfour, sentenced to life imprisonment with a minimum term of 16 years for her part in the July 2023 murder of Robert Fisher, loses an appeal to have her conviction quashed.
- 12 June – A French government agency alleges that social media accounts linked to an Israeli firm targeted John Swinney by spreading disinformation online before the 2026 Scottish Parliament election.
- 14 June – 2026 FIFA World Cup: Scotland secures its first World Cup match win since 1990 after defeating Haiti 1–0 in their opening match of the tournament.
- 15 June –
  - Drumduan School's kindergarten, which was co-founded by actress Tilda Swinton, is to close due to financial pressures it is announced.
  - The public is advised not to enter the sea at Edinburgh's Portobello Beach because of an ongoing pollution incident.
  - Glasgow Tartans, an American Football team formed in April, folds after playing only two matches.
- 16 June –
  - Part of Aberdeen beach is cordoned off, and people advised to avoid the area, following the discovery of an unexploded device.
  - The University of Dundee announces it is to cut a further 190 jobs as part of £20m in savings.
- 17 June – Security staff at Aberdeen Airport vote for industrial action in a dispute over pay.
- 18 June –
  - By-elections take place in Aberdeen South and Arbroath and Broughty Ferry after the sitting MPs, Stephen Flynn and Stephen Gethins, were elected to the Scottish Parliament in May. Douglas Lumsden MSP takes Aberdeen South for the Conservatives from the Scottish National Party, the party's first by-election win since 1973, and Lara Bird retains the Arbroath seat for the SNP.
  - Scottish Parliament officials announce that journalists will be restricted to a designated area when speaking to politicians after First Minister's Questions.
- 19 June –
  - Ruth Charteris KC is sworn in as Lord Advocate, while B. J. Gill KC is sworn in as Solicitor-General of Scotland.
  - A judge rules that Scottish Government prison guidance allowing some transgender prisoners to be held in jails matching their gender identity rather than their sex is unlawful.
  - Animal charities express concern about a potential outbreak of squirrelpox following reports of several sick red squirrels in Dollar, Clackmannanshire.
- 20 June – A man is charged following a series of attacks against Muslims in Edinburgh the previous day that left five people injured.
- 22 June – A man is remanded in custody after appearing in court charged with five counts of attempted murder linked to terrorism over attacks that occurred in Edinburgh on 19 June.
- 23 June –
  - Peter Murrell, former chief executive of the Scottish National Party, is sentenced to five years and three months in prison after pleading guilty to eight charges of embezzling a total of £459,000 between 2010 and 2023.
  - Former River City actor Iain Robertson is convicted of raping a woman and assaulting two others.
  - Transgender prisoners are being moved to prisons that correspond with their gender at birth after the Scottish Government announces it will not appeal against a court ruling on the issue.
- 24 June – Councillors in Dumfries and Galloway are to recommend the closure of Scotland's smallest school, Dalry Secondary, as only pupils are scheduled to enrol that at the beginning of the next academic years.
- 26 June –
  - 2026 United Kingdom heatwaves: Scotland is hit with overnight thunderstorms, with a yellow weather warning remaining in place for the day. An estimated 32,000 lightning strikes have occurred in Scotland over 24 hours.
  - The death is announced of Nicholas Rossi, an American rapist who faked his own death and fled to Scotland in order to escape justice. The Utah Department of Corrections confirms he died at a hospital on 25 June.
- 27 June –
  - King Charles III opens the seventh session of the Scottish Parliament, urging MSPs to help build a "fair and prosperous society".
  - Thousands of people take part in an anti-racism demonstration in Edinburgh a week on from the 2026 Edinburgh attacks.
  - An Orange Order march takes place in Stonehaven, the first to be held in the north east of Scotland for 25 years.
- 28 June – Steve Clarke resigns as head coach of Scotland following their exit from the World Cup.
- 30 June –
  - A patient is being tested for suspected ebola virus at a Glasgow hospital.
  - Councillors on the Shetland Islands give their backing to provisional plans to connect some of the islands via undersea tunnels that could be in place by 2034.

=== July ===
- 1 July – The Scottish Environment Protection Agency warns the public not to enter the water on a Fife beach after tests on Kinghorn Burn, which feeds into the sea, found the quality to be "intermittently poor".
- 5 July –
  - Police are making inquiries after a complaint concerning the finances of Yes Scotland.
  - A teenage driver dies after a two-car crash near Kelty, Fife.
- 6 July – Four councillors who voted to allow a rapist taxi driver to keep his operator's licence have resigned from Highland Council's licensing committee.
- 9 July – The old Conservative Club building in Edinburgh is destroyed by fire.
- 10 July –
  - A 24-year-old man is killed in a one-vehicle crash on the M74 in South Lanarkshire.
  - STV broadcasts the final edition of News at Six for northern Scotland from its Aberdeen studios ahead of changes to its news output.
- 13 July – Heather Herbert, a transgender activist and an employee of the University of Aberdeen, provokes outrage by posting that Ann Widdecombe's death was "good news" and that she hoped it was an "extremely painful death".
- 15 July – A number of villagers are evacuated after a wildfire breaks out in the Highlands.
- 16 July –
  - Firefighters have contained a large wildfire in Cairngorms National Park, but warn of the potential for other fires.
  - Courtney Gartshore is found guilty of the culpable homicide of her three-month-old daughter, Dahlia-Rose, in September 2023 after the girl died after receiving burns from a hairdryer.
  - An employee of the University of Aberdeen is arrested and charged over social media posts relating to the death of Ann Widdecombe.
- 18 July – 2026 Cairngorms wildfire: Around 100 firefighters continue to tackle a wildfire in the Cairngorms, but are reported to be making progress in extinguishing it.
- 19 July –
  - Scottish athlete Josh Kerr breaks the mile world record, recording a time of 3 minutes 42.66 seconds.
  - 2026 Cairngorms wildfire: Firefighters have "surrounded" a large wildfire in the Cairngorms.
  - Firefighters are tackling a large scale wildfire on Arthur's Seat.
- 20 July –
  - Following the previous day's fire at Arthur's Seat, it is announced that fire crews will remain at the site for the next day or two.
  - New prime minister Andy Burnham announces that Douglas Alexander will remain in the role of Secretary of State for Scotland.
- 21 July –
  - The fire at Arthur's Seat is extinguished.
  - Homes at Chryston are evacuated after gas leak.
  - A woman dies at a house in East Craigs, Edinburgh and a man is arrested.
  - Three teenagers are sentenced to prison terms for murdering 16-year-old Kayden Moy in Irvine on 17 May 2025.
- 22 July – Anas Sarwar resigns as Scottish Labour leader after accepting the role of Minister of State for Trade in the Burnham ministry.
- 23 July –
  - Prime Minister Andy Burnham meets the respective First Ministers of Scotland and Wales, John Swinney and Rhun ap Iorwerth, in Glasgow ahead of the 2026 Commonwealth Games opening ceremony. 10 Downing Street later confirms that the prospect of a second Scottish independence referendum was "off limits".
  - The opening ceremony of the 2026 Commonwealth Games takes place in Glasgow.
  - Former River City actor Iain Robertson is sentenced to nine years in prison after he was previously convicted of rape and assault.
- 23 July to 2 August – 2026 Commonwealth Games in Glasgow.
- 24 July –
  - 2026 Cairngorms wildfire: Police Scotland declare a major incident following what they describe as "a significant change in weather conditions".
  - Dornoch Highland Games is cancelled amid claims of financial irregularities.
- 25 July –
  - Police arrest 15 demonstrators as anti-racism and anti-immigration protests take place on Glasgow Green.
  - The Sons of the Holy Redeemer, an order of Roman Catholic monks on the island of Papa Stronsay, consecrate a new bishop without the permission of the pope.
  - Police launch an investigation after a car is driven at two officers in South Lanarkshire in what is suspected to be a case of attempted murder.
- 26 July –
  - Monica Lennon announces she will stand in the 2026 Scottish Labour leadership election.
  - Police Scotland says "further investigation is ongoing" into sexual assault allegations against Mohamed Al Fayed.
- 27 July –
  - Michael Marra announces he will stand in the Scottish Labour leadership election.
  - Aaron Strachan is sentenced to five years in prison with an order for lifelong restriction after he abducted and raped a 15-year-old girl in Edinburgh.
  - Police Scotland confirm that two people died while diving at Loch Fyne the previous day.
- 28 July –
  - An earthquake, recording a magnitude of 2.5, occurs in Lochaber.
  - Joe Fagan announces he will stand as a candidate in the Scottish Labour leadership election.
- 30 July –
  - Video footage emerges of a Snapchat post made from prison by Jay Stewart, one of the teenagers convicted of the murder of Kayden Moy, apparently rapping about the killing.
  - Joani Reid is readmitted to the Labour Party following her suspension.
  - Technical glitches affect the launch of ScotRail's new app, with passengers unable to book tickets or make reservations. The operator laterapologises for the issues.
  - Alex Williamson is dismissed as chief executive of Scottish Rugby following a lengthy investigation into allegations regarding his conduct.
- 31 July – A 46-year-old man is fatally injured during a collision between a car and a lorry on the A9 in Perthshire.

=== August ===
- 1 August – Edinburgh's King's Theatre reopens following a £41m refurbishment.
- 4 August – Publication of examination results for Nationals, Highers, Advanced Highers and Skills for Work Awards.
- 5 August –
  - The Scottish Government announces £5m of financial help for businesses affected by the Princes Street fire.
  - Four people are taken to hospital following a crash between two cars on the A82 road in Perthshire.
- 7 August –
  - The University of Glasgow announces a review of its appointment process for its former professor, Jason Arday, following Arday's resignation from the University of Cambridge over a plagiarism controversy.
  - Police are searching for child sex offender Cliff Lyons Dobbie, who absconded while on an escorted visit from hospital to Perth city centre.
- 8 August – Police Scotland confirm that Cliff Lyons Dobbie has been recaptured, while NHS Tayside launches an investigation into his disappearance.
- 10 August –
  - Marshall Strachan and Kieran Lindsay are given life sentences for murder over the death of John Taylor, who died outside his home after being attacked in October 2024.
  - Migrant hotel resident Muhammad Sheikhi is sentenced to four years in prison for sexually assaulting two women in Falkirk within the space of an hour in November 2025.
  - The Scottish Government announces a £3m financial package to support island businesses affected by ferry disruption.
  - Scottish Greens MSP Q Manivannan issues an apology following controversy over comments made about the "demonisation" of rape.
- 12 August – A further two cases of bluetongue virus are discovered in Dumfries and Galloway.
- 14 August –
  - Courtney Gartshore is sentenced to six years in prison for killing her baby daughter by burning her with a hairdryer.
  - Six people are arrested after a man is abducted in Edinburgh.
  - Glasgow City Council announces a public consultation on the future of the historic Queen's Park Glasshouse.
- 15 August – The Scottish FA announces that Sebastien Pocognoli has been appointed as the new head coach of the Scotland national football team.
- 17 August – Laura Docherty, who attempted to murder a toddler by repeatedly giving her adult medication, is sentenced to lifelong restriction order with a minimum of six years in prison.
- 18 August –
  - Scotland's state-owned shipyard, Ferguson Marine, announces plans to make a quarter of its staff redundant.
  - Figures from NHS Scotland indicate cases of bowel cancer in those aged under 50 are at a record high, with 290 cases diagnosed in 2024.
- 19 August – A case of mad cow disease is identified at a farm in Dumfries and Galloway.
- 20 August –
  - Reform Scotland leader Malcolm Offord reveals he was diagnosed with prostate cancer on 7 May, and has undergone surgery to have his prostate removed.
  - Glasgow City Council votes to cut wages for around 2,500 of its employees in order to settle an equal pay dispute.
- 21 August –
  - Staff and customers are evacuated from a Tesco supermarket in Glasgow following a vehicle fire in the car park.
  - A 23-year-old man is arrested following a bomb threat aboard the MV Caledonian Isles during a scheduled service to the Isle of Arran.
- 22 August –
  - A motorcyclist is fatally injured in a crash on the A857 on the Isle of Lewis.
  - Bluetongue virus has now been detected at eight farms in Dumfries and Galloway.
- 24 August – The Scottish National Investment Bank reports a net loss of £138m during 2025.
- 27 August – Residents of two streets in the Clackmannanshire village of Coalsnaughton are told their properties will have to be demolished after mining subsidence was discovered there.
- 28 August –
  - Seven people are charged over causing damage at Donald Trump's Turnberry Golf Course.
  - Celtic and Rangers are ordered to play their next home Scottish Cup matches behind closed doors after fans caused disorder at the previous season's quarter-final.
  - The Scottish Government publishes a draft bill setting out plans for a Scottish independence referendum.
- 29 August – Princes Street in Edinburgh fully reopens following a major fire at a former department store on 9 July.
- 31 August –
  - A children's nursery is fined after a 10-month-old child received burns from a bucket of boiling water containing bleach.
  - BBC One Scotland airs the final episode of its soap, River City.

=== September ===
- 2 September – A blacksmith's forge opens in Gretna Green, the first time blacksmithing has taken place in the village for 150 years.
- 3 September –
  - Jane Haining, a Scotswoman who died in the Holocaust after refusing to abandon Jewish children in her care, is added to a special memorial wall at Auschwitz Birkenau.
  - Former college lecturer Sophie Hynd pleads guilty to killing a husband and wife in a head-on crash on the B91 in Fife while drink-driving after a work Christmas party in December 2025.
- 4 September – A man is to stand trial accused of the murder of Michael McManus, a police station janitor who was killed on his way to work in the Riddrie area of Glasgow in July 1999.
- 7 September –
  - A woman is killed in a multiple vehicle collision on the M8 near Edinburgh Airport.
  - Bus fares in the West of Scotland are capped at £2 per journey.
- 8 September – Alan McPherson, an 83-year-old pensioner from Stenhousemuir, who police believe had accumulated the largest collection of child pornography in Scotland, is sentenced to four years in prison.
- 9 September – At Prime Minister's Questions, Andy Burnham suggests that a second Scottish independence referendum could be held if there is public demand for it.
- 10 September –
  - Burnham tells First Minister of Scotland John Swinney that a second independence referendum remains "off limits".
  - Ricky Bell is appointed leader of Glasgow City Council, replacing Susan Aitken.
- 16 September –
  - Irish President Catherine Connolly meets First Minister John Swinney at the beginning of a four-day visit to Scotland.
  - Forth Ports scraps plans to revive a ferry service between Scotland and mainland Europe amid concerns for its "long-term viability".
- 19 September – Michael Marra wins the 2026 Scottish Labour leadership election.
- 21 September –
  - The Scottish Government publishes proposals for council reforms that could see Scotland's 32 councils replaced with as few as six.
  - Edinburgh Airport unveils plans for a £500m expansion of its terminal and improvements to facilities.
- 22 September – Reform Scotland MSPs walk out of the Scottish Parliament's debating chamber in protest at a debate about Scottish independence.
- 23 September – BBC News reports the birth of a baby on the Orkney island of North Ronaldsay, the first to be born on the island since August 1992.
- 24 September – Glasgow City Council announces plans to dismiss and rehire 23,000 members of staff on new contracts following the breakdown of talks with union officials.
- 25 September – Glasgow City Council pauses its plans to fire and rehire its staff following online talks between council and union officials chaired by deputy first minister Jenny Gilruth.
- 27 September – The first trains call at the newly-opened Balgray railway station in Barrhead, East Renfrewshire, linking the south of the town to Glasgow.
- 29 September – Following his conviction on 24 August, former snooker world champion Graeme Dott is sentenced at Edinburgh's high court to seven years in prison for sexually abusing two children.
- 30 September –
  - First Minister John Swinney says he will introduce an education programme to teach school students in Scotland about misogyny.
  - Plans are submitted for a £16.5bn data centre at the site of the former Chapelcross nuclear power station.

=== October ===
- 1 October – The Scottish Government introduces rules for supermarkets that prevent some products that are high in fat, sugar and salt from being placed in prominent end-of-aisle slots, or feature as part of multi-buy offers in store or online.
- 2 October – The Royal Navy's newest Astute-class nuclear submarine HMS Agamemnon arrives at Faslane.
- 9 October –
  - The Nelson Mandela statue is unveiled in Glasgow, marking the 33rd anniversary of Mandela’s visit to the city.
  - A lone male stoat spotted on the Orkney island of Rousay in May, and considered an invasive species in the area, is captured and removed following a five-month hunt by wildlife volunteers.
- 10 October –
  - Several thousand demonstrators take part in a pro-Palestine march through central Edinburgh.
  - An 86-year-old man is killed in a two-vehicle collision on the A9 at Tarlogie.
- 11 October – Issues with the water supply at HMP Barlinnie, which left some inmates unable to run taps or flush toilets, are resolved after three days.
- 13 October –
  - Spectators are able to consume alcohol at their seats at Scotland's 2027 FIFA Women's World Cup play-off against Czech Republic, the first time alcohol has been allowed pitchside since 1981.
  - BBC Scotland journalist Steven Duff, who was excluded from a court hearing regarding a care home investigation he was working on in 2018, wins a ruling in the European Court of Human Rights that he should have been asked to leave the hearing.
- 14 October – Hurricane Isaias: Parts of Scotland are hit by heavy rain and high winds, with a windspeed of 109mph recorded at Applecross.
- 16 October –
  - Burnham invites the Scottish Government to work alongside the UK government to achieve greater devolution for Scotland.
  - Former police officer Campbell Petrie, who was convicted of a number of sex crimes, including the rape of two women, is sentenced to twelve years in prison.
- 19 October – Amanda Bland, an MSP for Central Scotland and Lothians West, quits Reform UK Scotland to sit as an independent MSP at Holyrood.
- 20 October – The BBC Scotland TV channel is to close as a linear service in Spring 2027, it is announced, and become an online service as the BBC makes £500m of savings.
- 23 October –
  - Storm Boelo: Trains are cancelled and police warn about unnecessary journeys as Scotland prepares for Storm Boelo, which is forecast to bring high winds and heavy rain.
  - It is confirmed that a second stoat has been captured and killed on the Orkney island of Rousay, where they are not a native species.
- 25 October – Storm Boelo: A man is killed by a falling tree in Dumfries and Galloway as strong winds continue.
- 26 October – Organisers of Edinburgh's Christmas ice rink announce the installation will not be present in 2026, the first time in its 30 year history it will not be present over the festive season.
- 27 October – Erica Matteo and Luke Anderson, both aged 19, become the youngest people to be ordained elders of the Church of Scotland in the Church's recent history.

=== November ===
- 6 November – A four-year-old boy dies after the vehicle he was travelling is involved in a crash in Bathgate, West Lothian.
- 7 November – Two men are arrested and three police officers injured during a street disturbance outside a bare-knuckle fighting championship at the Ovo Hydro in Glasgow.
- 9 November – DJ and producer Hannah Laing announces the cancellation of her Doof in the Park festival for 2027 after "behind the scenes issues" were not resolved.
- 10 November –
  - Seven people are taken to hospital after being struck by a car that mounted the pavement in the west end of Glasgow.
  - In his first major speech since becoming Scottish Labour leader, Michael Marra calls for the UK to rejoin the European Union.
- 11 November –
  - Education Secretary Mairi McAllan says there is no risk to the public after 1,000 schools received an email containing a bomb threat, the second time in a month such an incident has occurred.
  - A 32-year-old Scottish man is confirmed to have been one of the victims of the Krakow shooting.
- 18 November – Police are reported to be treating the shooting of a 27-year-old woman in Glasgow two days earlier as attempted murder.
- 19 November – Sean Grant, who planned to establish a militant pro-Palestine group and target police and Armed Forces in terrorist attacks, is sentenced to four-and-a-half years in prison.
- 20 November – Two men are killed after a glider crashes into Loch Leven.
- 21 November –
  - The Scottish Government orders a review into hepatobiliary surgery at NHS Grampian after a document showing 19 avoidable deaths at the health board was leaked.
  - The SNP writes off £60,000 in outstanding loan payments owed to the party's former chief executive, Peter Murrell, following his conviction for embezzlement.

== Deaths ==
- 11 January – John Wallace, 76, Scottish trumpeter, composer and arts educator.
- 12 January – Eddie McCreadie, 85, Scottish football player (Chelsea, national team) and manager (Chelsea).
- 29 January – Jim Wallace, Baron Wallace of Tankerness, 71, Scottish politician, acting first minister (2000, 2001) and deputy first minister (1999–2005), complications from surgery.
- 6 February – Mondula, 54, Scotland's only African elephant. (death announced on this date)
- 7 February – Jeane Freeman, 72, Scottish businesswoman and politician, MSP (2016–2021) and cabinet secretary for health and sport (2018–2021), cancer.
- 21 February – Bill Glen, 93, Scottish rugby union player (national team). (death announced on this date)
- 24 February – Jim Donnelly, 79, Scottish snooker player.
- 27 February – Margaret Farquhar, 95, Scottish politician, lord provost of Aberdeen (1996–1999). (death announced on this date)
- 14 March – Gordon Wallace, 82, Scottish football player (Dundee, Montrose) and manager (Raith Rovers). (death announced on this date)
- 15 March – Jim Fleeting, 70, Scottish football player (Ayr United, Clyde) and manager (Kilmarnock).
- 27 March – Alex Cropley, 75, English-Scottish footballer (Hibernian, Aston Villa, Scotland national team). (death announced on this date)
- 6 April – Sir Craig Reedie, 84, Scottish sports administrator, president of WADA (2014–2019), vice-president of the IOC (2012–2016), and chairman of the British Olympic Association (1992–2005). (death announced on this date)
- 8 April – Doug Allan, 74–75, Scottish wildlife photographer and cameraman.
- 11 April – John Dalgleish Donaldson, 84, Scottish-Australian mathematician.
- 15 April – Alexander Morton, 81, Scottish actor (Monarch of the Glen, Take the High Road, Taggart). (death announced on this date)
- 22 April – Allan Hosie, 80, Scottish rugby referee.
- 24 April – Quintin Young, 78, Scottish footballer (Rangers, Ayr United, East Fife). (death announced on this date)
- 29 April – Donald MacRae, 84, Scottish folk singer.
- 30 April – Alex Ligertwood, 79, Scottish musician and singer (Santana).
- 17 May – Scott Hastings, 61, Scottish rugby union player (Watsonians, Edinburgh, national team), non-Hodgkin lymphoma.
- 18 May – Jim Irvine, 85, Scottish footballer (Dundee United, Middlesbrough, Barrow). (death announced on this date)
- 20 May – Mike Galloway, 60, English-born Scottish football player (Halifax Town, Celtic, national team) and coach. (death announced on this date)
- 28 May – Meta Ramsay, Baroness Ramsay of Cartvale, 89, Scottish intelligence officer and peer, member of the House of Lords (since 1996).
- 4 June – Ian Hampton, 79, Scottish bassist (Sparks).
- 1 July – Vladimir McTavish, 70, Scottish comedian.
- 7 July –
  - James Mackay, Baron Mackay of Clashfern, 99, Scottish lawyer and life peer, Lord Advocate (1979–1984), Lord Clerk Register (2007–2022), and member of the House of Lords (1979–2022).
  - Tom Sweenie, 80, Scottish footballer (Leicester City, York City).
- 10 July – Mike Larnach, 73, Scottish footballer (Clydebank, Motherwell, Ayr United).
- 26 July – Sir Ian Wood, 84, Scottish engineering and consulting executive, founder of the Wood Group.
- 27 July – Phyllida Law, 94, Scottish actress (Kingdom, Much Ado About Nothing, Peter's Friends).
- 3 August – John Douglas, 63, Scottish musician (Trashcan Sinatras) and songwriter ("Obscurity Knocks", "Only Tongue Can Tell").
- 22 August – Bobby Ross, 84, Scottish football player (Brentford, Shrewsbury Town) and coach (Hayes). (death announced on this date)
- 26 August – Donna Brand, 47, convicted murderer.
- 2 September – Hugh Curran, 82, Scottish footballer (Norwich City, Wolverhampton, national team).
- 6 September – Bill Dundee, 82, Scottish professional wrestler (AWA, NWA, WCW).
- 11 September – Harry Kirk, 82, Scottish footballer (Scunthorpe United, Stockport County, Darlington).
- 19 September – Willie Callaghan, 83, Scottish footballer (Dunfermline Athletic, Berwick Rangers, Cowdenbeath).
- 26 September – Tony Currie, 74, Scottish broadcaster (Radio Clyde), tonsil cancer.
- 5 October – Lena Martell, 86, Scottish singer ("One Day at a Time"). (death announced on this date)
- 6 October – Paul Ferris, 62, Scottish writer and organised crime figure.
- 12 October – James Lindesay-Bethune, 16th Earl of Lindsay, 70, Scottish hereditary peer, businessman and politician, member of the House of Lords (1989–2026). (death announced on this date)
- 16 October – Douglas Dunn, 83, Scottish poet, academic and critic.
- 23 October – Lorn Cowie, Lord Cowie, 100, Scottish rugby union player (West of Scotland, national team) and jurist, senator of the College of Justice (1977–1994).
- 24 October – Pauline Parker, 88, New Zealand convicted murderer (Parker–Hulme murder case). (death reported on this date)
