= List of Conservative Party defections to Reform UK =

List covering British politics

Logo of the Conservative Party

Logo of Reform UK

This is a list of defections from the British Conservative Party to Reform UK, including former Cabinet members, sitting Shadow Cabinet members and backbenchers, and former Members of Parliament (MPs). As of January 2026, eleven former Conservative Party cabinet ministers have also defected to Reform UK.

All eight of Reform UK's MPs have been a Conservative Party member at some point, as was Rupert Lowe, who was suspended from Reform UK in March 2025 before launching his own rival party, Restore Britain the following year.

== Sitting MPs ==
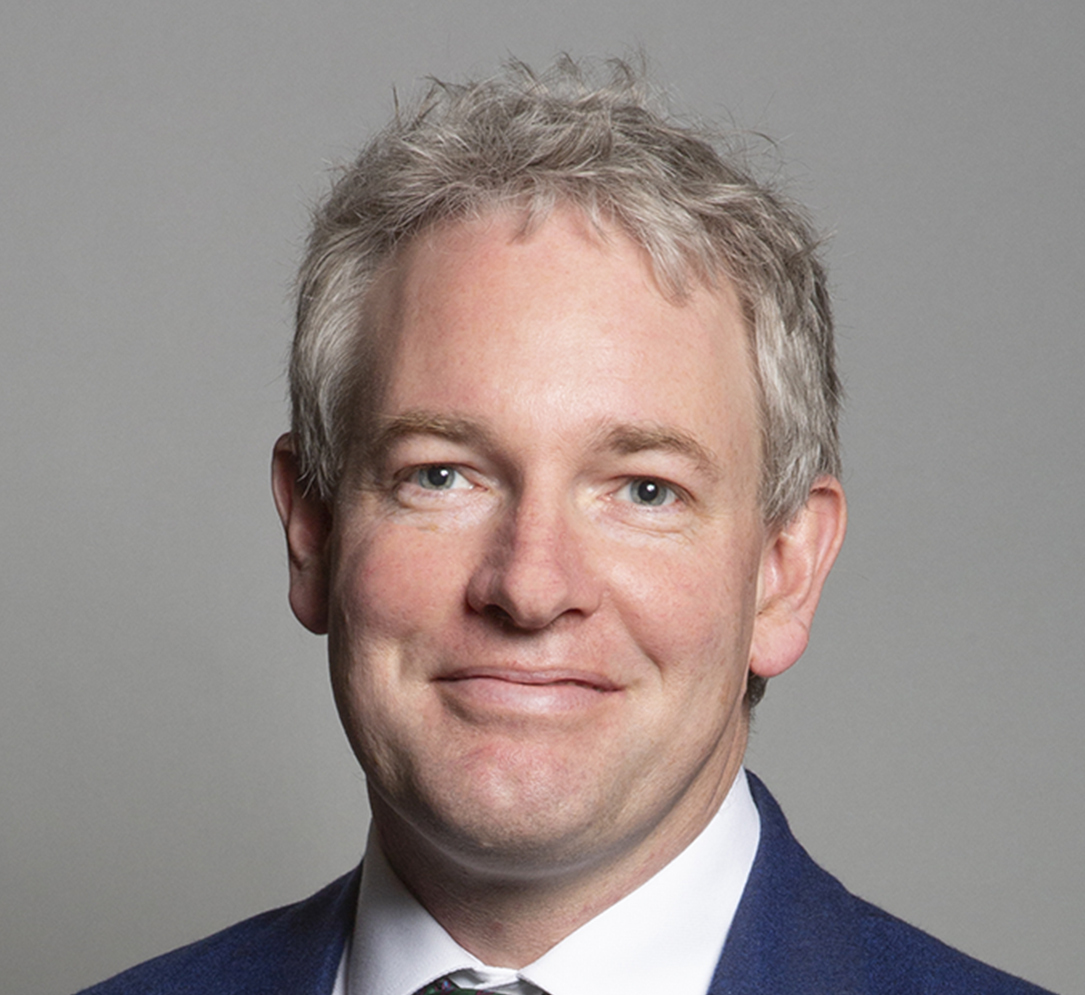
Danny Kruger, the first sitting Conservative MP to defect straight from the Conservatives to Reform UK.

The following are MPs who defected while sitting as an MP in the House of Commons.

=== Frontbench ===
- Robert Jenrick (joined 15 January 2026) – Shadow Secretary of State for Justice (November 2024 to January 2026) He had the Conservative whip and his party membership removed by the leader Kemi Badenoch, following evidence that he was planning to defect. He sat as an independent MP briefly before joining Reform UK the same day.
- Danny Kruger (defected 15 September 2025) – Shadow Minister for Work and Pensions (November 2024 to September 2025)
- Andrew Rosindell (defected 18 January 2026) – Shadow Minister for Foreign Affairs (November 2024 to January 2026)

=== Backbenchers ===
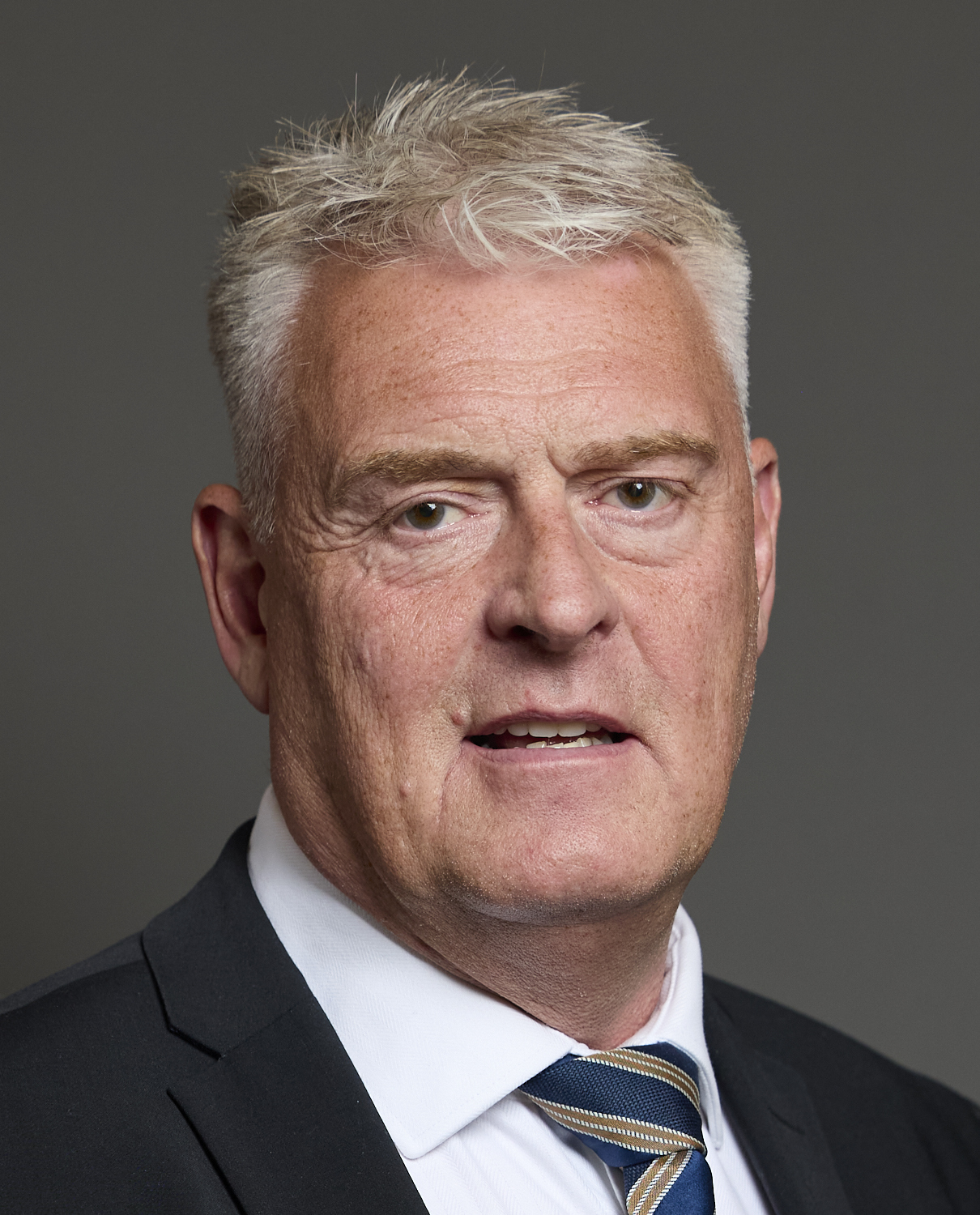
Lee Anderson, first Reform MP, Anderson was an independent MP when he joined, after having the Conservative Whip suspended for remarks about London Mayor Sadiq Khan that the Conservative Party deemed Islamophobic.

- Lee Anderson (joined March 2024) – elected in 2019 as a member of the Conservative Party, but joined Reform in March 2024 after becoming an independent after having the whip suspended for remarks about London Mayor Sadiq Khan that the Conservative Party deemed Islamophobic. He was re-elected as a MP at the 2024 general election for Reform UK, and appointed as the Chief Whip of Reform UK in the House of Commons on 11 July 2024.
- Suella Braverman (defected 26 January 2026) – first elected in 2015 for Fareham (Fareham and Waterlooville since 2024), Braverman served as Home Secretary from 6 September to the 19 October 2022 under Prime Minister Liz Truss, before resigning, then being reappointed 6 days later by, and serving under, Prime Minister Rishi Sunak from the 25 October 2022 until her dismissal by Sunak on the 13 November 2023.

== Former MPs ==
The following are MPs who defected after their term as MP in the House of Commons ended.

=== Former frontbenchers ===
==== Cabinet Ministers ====
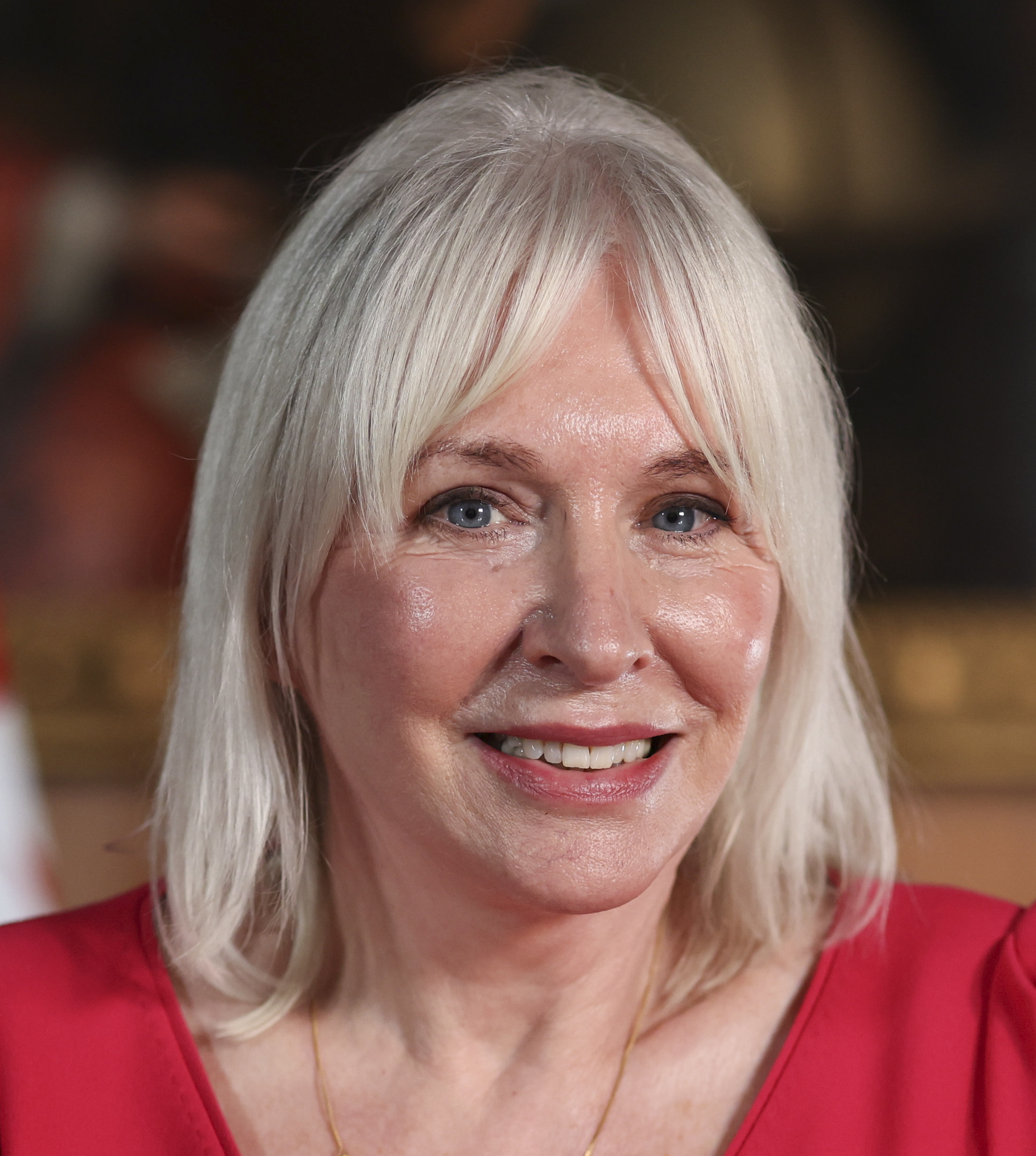
Nadine Dorries is a former Conservative MP who was the Secretary of State for Culture, Media and Sport from 2021 to 2022. She defected from the Conservative Party to Reform UK in September 2025.

- Nadine Dorries (defected 4 September 2025) – Former Secretary of State for Culture, Media and Sport (2021–2022) and MP for Mid Bedfordshire (2005–2023). Dorries was a member of the Conservative Party for 25 years.
- David Jones (defected 7 July 2025) – Former Secretary of State for Wales (2012–2014), Minister of State for Exiting the European Union (2016–2017), and MP for Clwyd West (2005–2024). Jones was Conservative Party member for over 50 years.
- Sir Jake Berry (defected 9 July 2025) – Former Chairman of the Conservative Party and Minister without Portfolio (September–October 2022), Minister of State for the Northern Powerhouse and Local Growth (2017–2020), and MP for Rossendale and Darwen
- Nadhim Zahawi (defected 12 January 2026) – Former Chancellor of the Exchequer (July–September 2022), and MP for Stratford-on-Avon (2010–2024)

==== Ministers ====
- Dame Andrea Jenkyns (defected 28 November 2024) – former MP for Morley and Outwood, elected as the first Mayor of Greater Lincolnshire in 2025 for Reform, becoming one of Reform's first two elected mayors, alongside Luke Campbell, who was elected concurrently as the inaugural Mayor of Hull and East Yorkshire.
- Adam Holloway (defected 30 July 2025) – former MP for Gravesham (2005–2024)
- Maria Caulfield (defected 16 September 2025) – former MP for Lewes (2015–2024)
- Sarah Atherton (defected 2 October 2025) – former MP for Wrexham (2019–2024)
- Jonathan Gullis (defected 1 December 2025) – former MP for Stoke-on-Trent North (2019–2024)
- Lia Nici (defected 1 December 2025) – former MP for Great Grimsby (2019–2024)
- Colin Clark (defected 19 April 2026) – former MP for Gordon (2017–2019)
- Damien Moore (defected 21 April 2026) – former MP for Southport (2017–2024)
- Darren Henry (defected 2026) – former MP for Broxtowe (2019–2024)
- Julian Brazier (defect 2026) – former MP for Canterbury (1987–2017)

=== Former backbenchers ===
- Jane Stevenson (defected 1 May 2026) – former MP for Wolverhampton North East (2019–2024)
- Ben Bradley (defected 7 December 2025) – former MP for Mansfield (2017–2024)
- Chris Green (defected 1 December 2025) – former MP for Bolton West (2015–2024)
- Anne Marie Morris (defected 2 July 2025) – former MP for Newton Abbot (2010–2024)
- Ross Thomson (defected 24 June 2025) – former MP for Aberdeen South (2017–2019)
- Alan Amos (defected 3 April 2025) – former MP for Hexham (1987–1992)
- Marco Longhi (defected 3 January 2025) – former MP for Dudley North (2019–2024)
- Michael Brown (defected 1 January 2025) – former MP for Brigg and Cleethorpes (1979–1997)
- Aidan Burley (defected 10 December 2024) – former MP for Cannock Chase (2010–2015)
- Henry Smith (defected 24 September 2025) – former MP for Crawley (2010–2024)
- Lucy Allan (defected May 2024) – former MP for Telford (2015–2024)

== Peers in the House of Lords ==
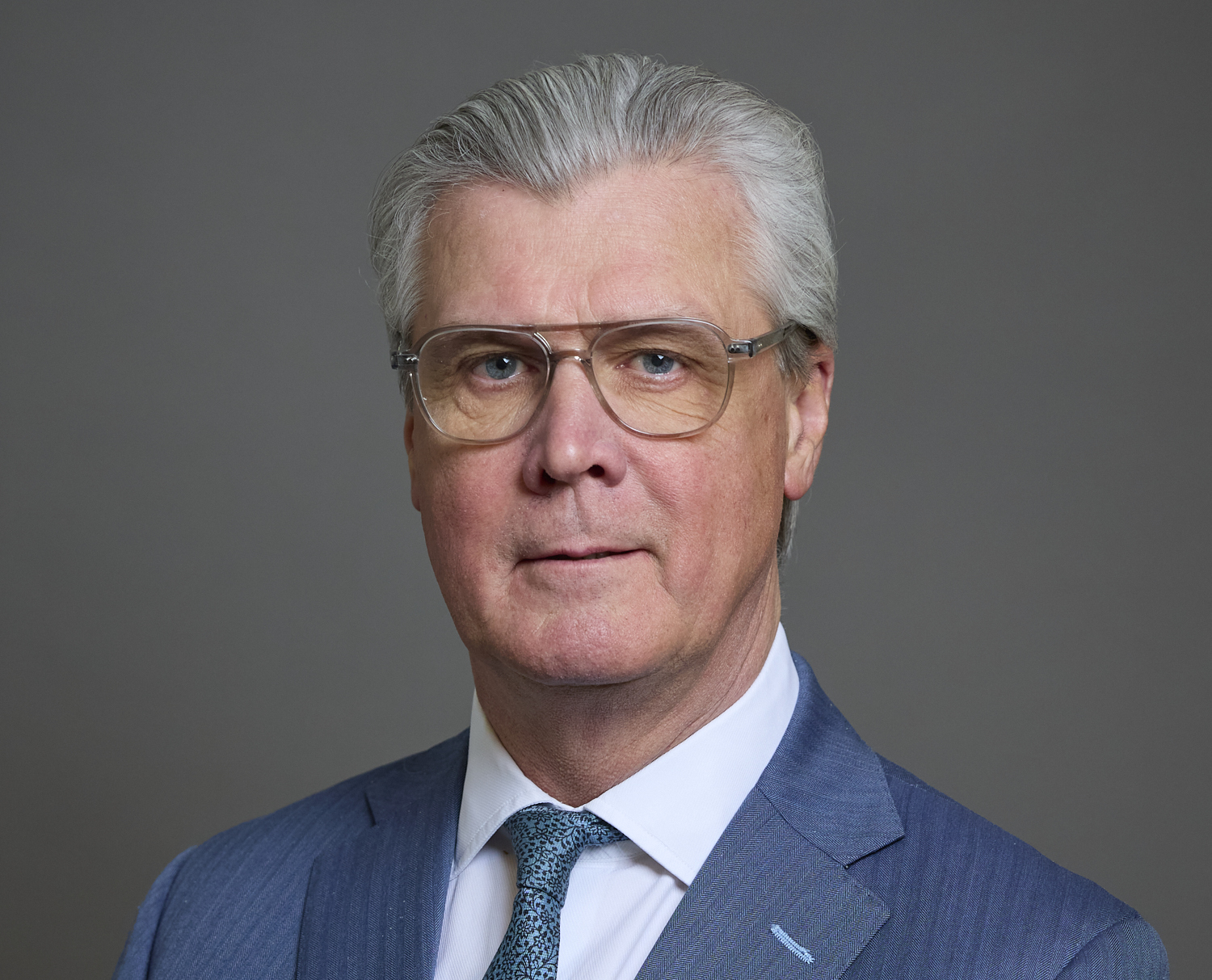
Malcolm Ian Offord, Baron Offord of Garvel, defected from the Conservative Party to Reform in December 2025, becoming the first Reform Peer in the House of Lords. He was appointed by Nigel Farage as Reform's Scottish Leader in January 2026.

The following are Peers who defected while sitting in the House of Lords.

- Malcolm Ian Offord, Baron Offord of Garvel (defected 6 December 2025) – appointed life peer on the 13 October 2021 while a member of the Conservative Party by Prime Minister Boris Johnson. After defecting to Reform on the 6 December 2025, he was appointed by Reform Leader Nigel Farage as Leader of Reform UK Scotland on 15 January 2026, and resigned from the Lords on the 30 January 2026 due to his intention to run in the 2026 Scottish Parliament election. At the election on 7 May 2026, Offord received 5,649 votes (17.6%) in Inverclyde, placing third behind the SNP's Stuart McMillan (14,193 votes) and Labour's Francesca Brennan (8,876 votes). He was subsequently elected as a regional list MSP for West Scotland.

== Members of the Scottish Parliament ==
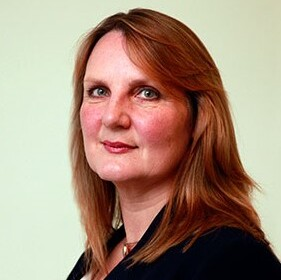
Michelle Ballantyne defected to Reform in January 2021, becoming the Party's first MSP, serving until she lost her seat in the Scottish Parliament election in May 2021, and served as Reform's first Scottish Leader until February 2022.

The following are Members of the Scottish Parliament who have defected to Reform while sitting in the Parliament.

- Michelle Ballantyne (joined January 2021) – On 24 November 2020, Ballantyne quit the Scottish Conservatives to sit as an independent MSP, citing differences on policies and principles with the party and its new leader Douglas Ross. Ballantyne joined Reform UK in January 2021, and was appointed as the first Leader of Reform UK Scotland. Ballantyne lost her seat in the 2021 Scottish Parliament election, and resigned as Reform's Scottish Leader on the 16 February 2022.
- Graham Simpson (defected 27 August 2025) – member of the Scottish Parliament for Central Scotland (2016–present)

== Members of the Senedd ==
The following are Members of the Senedd (the Welsh Parliament) formally known as the Welsh Assembly prior to 2020, who have defected to Reform while sitting in the Parliament.

- Mark Reckless (joined 15 May 2019) – Assembly member for South Wales East (2016–2021). He defected from the Conservative party to UKIP in 2014, before leaving UKIP and rejoining the Welsh Conservative group in 2017. Although he didn't become a Conservative party member, he later left left the group in April 2019 when the Brexit Party was formed, and briefly sat as an independent before joining the Brexit Party alongside three other former UKIP Assembly members.
- Laura Anne Jones (defected 22 July 2025) – member of the Senedd for South Wales East (2003–2007; 2020–present)
- James Evans (defected 5 February 2026) – member of the Senedd for Brecon and Radnorshire (2021–present)

== Members of the London Assembly ==
The following are members of the London Assembly who have defected from the Conservative Party.

- Keith Prince (defected 4 October 2025) – member of the London Assembly for Havering and Redbridge (2016–present)
- Alex Wilson (defected in 2020) – additional member of the London Assembly and the Leader of Reform UK in the London Assembly (2024–present), formerly a member of Redbridge London Borough Council for Wanstead with the Conservative Party (2009–2014)

== Police and crime commissioners ==
The following are individuals who defected while serving as a police and crime commissioner.

- Rupert Matthews (defected August 2025) – Elected in 2021, and re-elected in 2024, as the Leicestershire Police and Crime Commissioner for the Conservatives, Matthews defected in August 2025.

== See also ==
- List of Reform UK politicians
  - List of Reform UK MPs
