= 2026 in Scottish television =

This is a list of events taking place in 2026 relating to Scottish television.

== Events ==
=== January ===
- 1 January – BBC Scotland's Hogmanay is again hosted by Amy Irons, Des Clarke and others.

=== April ===
- 25 April – The cast and crew of BBC One Scotland's soap River City film the series' final scenes after 24 years on air.

=== May ===
- 8 May – Journalists and some technical staff at STV were scheduled to stage a 24-hour strike over a pay freeze, on a day when the results of the 2026 Scottish Parliament elections were to be announced.

=== June ===
- 1 June – Ofcom approves STV's plan to axe its separate news programme for the north of Scotland.
- 23 June – Former River City actor Iain Robertson is convicted of raping a woman and assaulting two others.

=== July ===
- 10 July – STV broadcasts the final edition of News at Six for northern Scotland from its Aberdeen studios ahead of changes to its news output.
- 23 July – Former River City actor Iain Robertson is sentenced to nine years in prison after he was previously convicted of rape and assault.

=== August ===
- August – For the first time, BBC Scotland does not broadcast a Saturday afternoon results programme. Instead BBC One Scotland simulcasts Final Score.
- 31 August – BBC One Scotland airs the final episode of its soap, River City.

=== October ===
- 20 October – The BBC Scotland TV channel is to close as a linear service in Spring 2027, it is announced, and become an online service as the BBC makes £500m of savings.

== Ongoing television programmes ==
=== 1960s ===
- Reporting Scotland (1968–1983; 1984–present)

=== 1970s ===
- Sportscene (1975–present)
- Landward (1976–present)
- The Beechgrove Garden (1978–present)

=== 1990s ===
- Eòrpa (1993–present)

=== 2000s ===
- River City (2002–2026)
- The Adventure Show (2005–present)
- An Là (2008–present)
- Trusadh (2008–present)
- STV Rugby (2009–2010; 2011–present)
- STV News at Six (2009–present)

=== 2010s ===
- Scotland Tonight (2011–present)
- Shetland (2013–present)
- Two Doors Down (2016–present)
- Debate Night (2019–present)
- A View from the Terrace (2019–present)

=== 2020s ===
- BBC Reporting Scotland: News at Seven (2025–present)

== Ending this year ==
- 31 August – River City (2002–2026)

== See also ==
- 2026 in Scotland
