= Malcolm Offord =

Scottish politician and financer (born 1964)

The Right Honourable The Lord Offord of Garvel CVO MSP
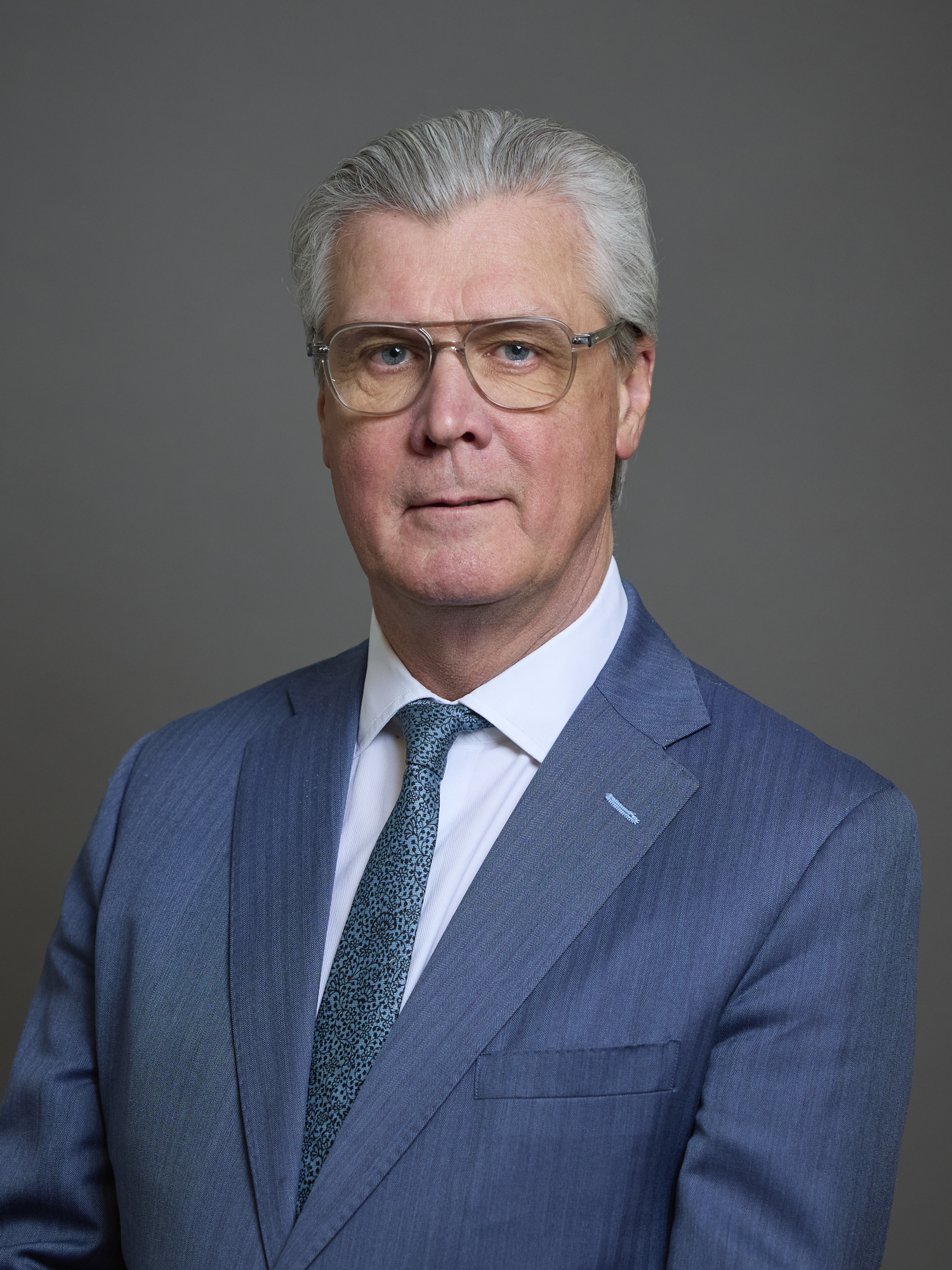
- Official portrait, 2025

Leader of Reform UK Scotland
- Incumbent
- Assumed office 15 January 2026
- Deputy: Thomas Kerr
- UK party leader: Nigel Farage
- Preceded by: Michelle Ballantyne (Note: Office vacant from 16 February 2022 to 15 January 2026)
Junior ministerial offices
Parliamentary Under-Secretary of State for Exports
In office 24 April 2023 – 5 July 2024
Prime Minister	Rishi Sunak
Preceded by	Andrew Bowie
Succeeded by	Gareth Thomas
Parliamentary Under-Secretary of State for Scotland
In office 4 October 2021 – 29 February 2024 Serving with Iain Stewart (2021–2022); David Duguid (Sept–Oct 2022); John Lamont (2022–2024)
Prime Minister	Boris Johnson; Liz Truss; Rishi Sunak
Preceded by	David Duguid
Succeeded by	The Lord Cameron of Lochiel

Member of the Scottish Parliament for West Scotland (1 of 7 Regional MSPs)
- Incumbent
- Assumed office 7 May 2026

Member of the House of Lords
- Lord Temporal
- Life peerage 13 October 2021 – 30 January 2026

Personal details
- Born: Malcolm Ian Offord; 5 September 1964 (age 62) Greenock, Renfrewshire, Scotland
- Party: Reform UK (from 2025)
- Other political affiliations: Conservative (until 2025)
- Spouse: Elizabeth Offord (divorced)
- Education: University of Edinburgh (LLB)

Malcolm Ian Offord, Baron Offord of Garvel (born 5 September 1964) is a Scottish politician who has served as the Leader of Reform Scotland since 2026 and as a Member of the Scottish Parliament (MSP) for West Scotland since May 2026. He was a member of the House of Lords from 2021 until his resignation in 2026. He was a member of the Conservative Party until December 2025 when he defected to Reform.

Following Offord being appointed the Scottish leader of Reform, he resigned from the House of Lords, which took effect on 30 January 2026, and announced his intention to run in the 2026 Scottish Parliament election. He stood for the Inverclyde constituency, placing third behind the SNP and Labour. He was subsequently elected as a regional list MSP for West Scotland. As leader of Reform Scotland, Offord returned 17 MSPs to Holyrood, all through the regional list, and no constituency seats.

== Early life, education and pre-political career ==
Offord was born in Greenock, in September 1964. He was educated at Ardgowan Primary School and Greenock Academy, and graduated in law from the University of Edinburgh.

Offord worked at the merchant bank Lazard from 1987 until 1993, in the corporate finance department, specialising in mergers and acquisitions.

In 1994, he began his private equity investing career with 3i plc, followed by two years at Bankers Trust of New York, where he was managing director of European Acquisition Finance. In 1998, he joined Charterhouse Capital Partners as a partner and remained there for sixteen years, investing in four European private equity funds before retiring as senior partner in December 2013. Offord is the founder and chair of Edinburgh-based private equity company, Badenoch and Co.

He has donated £147,500 to the Conservative Party.

== Early political aspirations ==
Offord was a member of the Advisory Board at the Centre for Social Justice, a centre-right leaning think-tank established by former Conservative Party leader Iain Duncan Smith. In 2009, he wrote a paper called "Bankrupt Britain" in which he called for reforms to public spending.

=== 2014 Scottish independence referendum ===
During the campaign leading up to the 2014 Scottish independence referendum Offord was one of the directors (between 18 March 2014 and 1 January 2015) of a pro-union campaign group called Vote No Borders Campaign that spent £147,510 (just short of the £150,000 limit). The group attracted controversy when it created an advert claiming that after independence Scots would struggle to get treatment at Great Ormond Street Hospital; the hospital objected that they hadn't been consulted, the claim wasn't true and asked for the advert to be withdrawn. Four years after the referendum the group received further attention as it missed a deadline to file accounts with Companies House. The Vote No Borders Campaign was dissolved 7 June 2016.

=== 2021 Scottish Parliament election ===
At the May 2021 Scottish Parliament election, Offord stood as a Scottish Conservatives list candidate for the Lothian electoral region, but having been placed fifth on the list he failed to gain a seat. His selection had been criticised by other Conservatives as "cronyism". One Conservative told the Edinburgh Evening News: "It seems all you need to get an endorsement is to have deep pockets." The article also mentioned that Offord's support of the Conservatives goes back at least 14 years, with the businessman donating £15,000 as recently as November 2019.

During the 2021 election campaign, Offord wrote a series of essays entitled "The United Kingdom: Why Scotland Should Remain", some of which were published by Reform Scotland, Policy Exchange and The Spectator. One of Offord's essays published on the Reform Scotland think tank website cited the Government Expenditure and Revenue Scotland report in which he proposed that "It should be a matter of principle and pride for any Scottish government, Unionist or Nationalist, to reduce the gap between expenditure and revenue in Scotland. I do not want the case for the Union in Scotland to be built on the idea of dependency; I want our Union to be constructed on the idea of mutual benefit and reciprocity where England, Scotland, Wales and Northern Ireland all do their best to raise and share resources for the common good. Whether pro-union or pro-independence, this is a goal we should all unite around."

== Government minister and life peer ==
=== Member of the House of Lords (2021–2026) ===
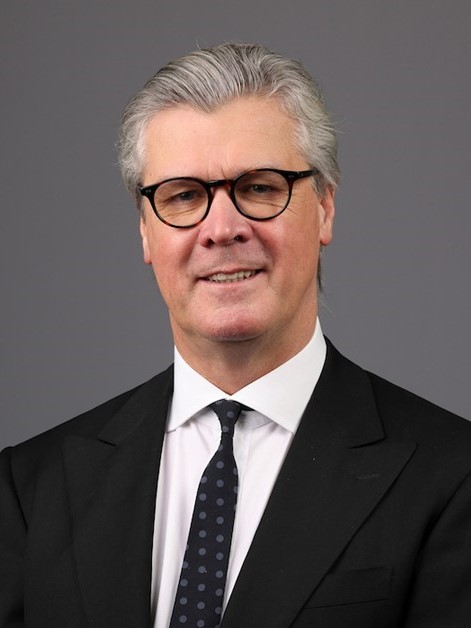
Official ministerial portrait, 2021

On 30 September 2021, it was announced that Offord would be made a life peer. He was created Baron Offord of Garvel, of Greenock in the County of Renfrewshire, on 14 October and introduced to the House of Lords the next day. He should have made his maiden speech as a Lord in December 2021. However, he could not do so because he was self-isolating and gave the speech on 20 January 2022 instead.

In his maiden speech Offord expressed support for the UK's Net zero objectives, arguing that the UK could demonstrate global leadership on climate change by cutting emissions while continuing to grow its economy. Reflecting on his participation in COP26, he stated that the UK possessed the capital, technical expertise and political will to meet the climate challenge, and highlighted collaboration between the oil and gas industry and international partners to repurpose existing assets and skills towards low-carbon energy sources. He emphasised Scotland's role in the UK's energy transition, citing its contribution to wind power generation, skilled employment and energy infrastructure. At the same time, Offord argued that the transition should be managed rather than abrupt, maintaining that net zero implied a gradual reduction rather than the immediate elimination of carbon use, and that continued domestic oil and gas production was necessary to ensure energy security and avoid increased reliance on imported fossil fuels.

He was appointed Commander of the Royal Victorian Order (CVO) in the 2024 New Year Honours for services as a trustee of the Duke of Edinburgh's Award Scheme.

Offord confirmed he would resign from the House of Lords in order to campaign for a seat in Holyrood at the 2026 Scottish Parliament election. His resignation formally took effect on 30 January 2026.

=== Minister for Scotland (2021–2024) ===
Offord was appointed as Parliamentary Under-Secretary of State for Scotland by Boris Johnson on 4 October 2021. He was chosen instead of two Scottish Conservative MPs, Andrew Bowie and John Lamont. Offord replaced incumbent Parliamentary Under Secretary of State, David Duguid.

Offord was reappointed as a Parliamentary Under Secretary of State in the Scotland Office by both Liz Truss and Rishi Sunak.

He stepped down from the Scotland Office upon Donald Cameron's appointment to the House of Lords and as Parliamentary Under Secretary for Scotland.

=== Minister for Exports (2023–2024) ===
In April 2023, he was appointed by Rishi Sunak as a Parliamentary Under Secretary of State in the Department for Business and Trade, in addition to his role as a Parliamentary Under Secretary of State in the Scotland Office.

As Minister for Exports, Offord set annual priorities for UK Export Finance (UKEF) that included expanding outreach to "a more diverse customer base", specifically naming "underserved businesses such as those owned by women and ethnic minorities". In a subsequent priorities letter, he stated that "there is huge potential amongst women and ethnic minority led businesses" and that UKEF should be "at the forefront of unlocking that potential". UKEF's 2024–2029 business plan committed to better targeting "underserved" businesses such as "ethnic-minority and women-led businesses" and to measure and increase the proportion of underserved businesses it supports year-on-year. In its Annual Report and Accounts 2024–25, UKEF reported hosting two events for ethnic minority-led and female-led businesses on access to export finance, and stated it would engage directly with ethnic minority-led businesses to address barriers and ensure its offer meets the needs of these underserved firms, in response to Offord's priorities as Minister.

As part of the Sunak government's broader net zero priorities, Offord stated in his annual priorities letter to UK Export Finance (UKEF) that supporting the UK's growing clean growth and transition industries was a government priority, emphasising the importance of placing UK suppliers at the heart of the global low-carbon transition and recognising both the environmental and economic opportunities involved, as well as the scale of finance required. Following this, UKEF set an ambition in its 2024–2029 Business Plan to provide £10 billion of clean growth finance over five years to accelerate the UK's green export sector, and published a Sustainability Strategy outlining how it would work with other public sector finance bodies and international partners to support exports in clean growth and transition sectors.

Following the defeat of Rishi Sunak in the 2024 general election, Offord was replaced as Export Minister by Gareth Thomas.

== Leader of Reform UK Scotland ==
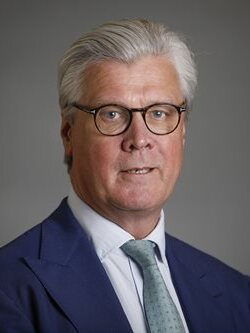
Scottish Parliament portrait, 2026

On 6 December 2025, Offord defected to Reform UK at a rally broadcast live from Falkirk, Scotland. The leader of Reform UK, Nigel Farage, welcomed him as "somebody who I think will have a transformative effect on our party here in Scotland", describing the defection as "a brave and historic act".

On 15 January 2026, Farage formally appointed Offord as the leader of Reform UK Scotland at a press conference in Fife. Like Farage’s accession to the leadership of Reform UK, Offord was not elected to the position.

Offord led Reform UK Scotland into the 2026 Scottish Parliament election, announcing his intention to run for a seat in Holyrood. On 6 March 2026, it was announced he will be standing in the Inverclyde constituency.

In the 2026 election, although the party failed to win any constituency seats, Reform UK Scotland won 17 MSPs via the list vote — tying with Scottish Labour for second place.

Thomas Kerr was elected as Offord’s deputy shortly after the election by fellow Reform MSPs.

=== West Scotland MSP (2026–present) ===
At the election on 7 May 2026, Offord received 5,649 votes (17.6%) in Inverclyde, placing third behind the SNP's Stuart McMillan (14,193 votes) and Labour's Francesca Brennan (8,876 votes). He was subsequently elected as a regional list MSP for West Scotland.

=== Homophobia allegations ===
In March 2026, sources close to Offord said he had apologised and donated to an LGBT+ charity for a homophobic joke made after the death of the singer George Michael. In a Burns supper speech to a bowling club in 2018, he had attempted to link George Michael's lyrics to the work of Robert Burns, drunkenly dancing to clips of Michael's music before making comments which the Daily Record, the paper which initially reported the story, refused to print. Those comments were reported by The National as, "Fadi Fawaz, George Michael’s partner at the time of his death, takes the late singer’s ashes to a curry house after his death. Fawaz asks the chef to make a curry with the ashes. When asked why, Fawaz replies: 'I want to feel him oozing out of my arse one last time.'"

== Personal life ==
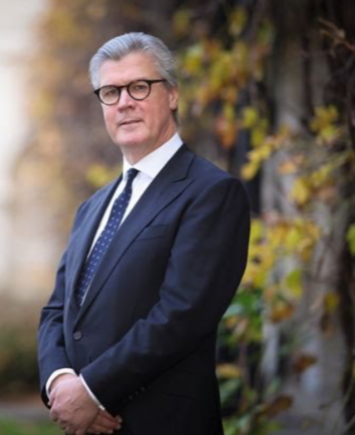
Offord in 2022

Offord was married to Elizabeth Offord, with whom he shared trusteeship of the Badenoch Trust, a private family charitable trust. He said that defecting to Reform UK from the Conservatives led to him losing some friendships.

Offord has said that he owns six homes, six boats, and five cars.

== See also ==
- List of Conservative Party defections to Reform UK

== Notes ==
Orders of precedence in the United Kingdom
Preceded by The Lord Stevens of Birmingham	Gentlemen; Baron Offord of Garvel	Followed by The Lord Harrington of Watford
