= Devo Plus =

Political pressure group

Devo Plus was a cross-party and non-party grouping which was set up in 2012 by Reform Scotland to promote the idea of the Scottish Parliament, as far as possible, raising the money it spends, and its objective is to see the creation of a system which allows for this to happen.

In the plans set out by Reform Scotland the Scottish Parliament would take control of most taxes, with the exceptions of VAT and National Insurance, to raise the income necessary to meet the Scottish Parliament's expenditure responsibilities. Westminster would continue to raise the money it spends in Scotland through VAT and NI. The group was led by former Lib Dem MSP Jeremy Purvis and chaired by Reform Scotland chairman Ben Thomson. Members of the group included Conservative MSP Alex Fergusson, Lib Dem MSP Tavish Scott and Labour MSP Duncan McNeil.
