= Statue of Nelson Mandela, Glasgow =

Statue in Glasgow, Scotland

Nelson Mandela
- Artist: Alan B Herriot
- Year: 9 October 2026
- Type: Bronze
- Location: Glasgow, Scotland

The statue of Nelson Mandela is a large bronze sculpture of the former President of South Africa and anti-apartheid activist Nelson Mandela, located in Nelson Mandela Place in Glasgow, Scotland.

== Description ==
The Nelson Mandela statue in Glasgow is a public monument commemorating the South African anti-apartheid leader and former president Nelson Mandela. The statue is to be installed in Nelson Mandela Place, in Glasgow city centre.

Scottish sculptor Alan B Herriot was selected to create the statue following a competitive selection process in which five artists were shortlisted to produce a maquette. Herriot described his appointment as an honour and said the statue would be a source of "immense pride" for the city.

The project is overseen by the Nelson Mandela Scottish Memorial Foundation (NMSMF), which set a target unveiling date of 9 October. According to the foundation's chair, Brian Filling, who also serves as South Africa's honorary consul in Scotland, Herriot's design captures "the essence of Mandela’s struggle, his strength and resilience."

Glasgow's Lord Provost, Jacqueline McLaren, stated that the statue would serve as a permanent tribute to Mandela's legacy and help preserve the lessons of the anti-apartheid movement for future generations.

== History ==
Glasgow holds a unique place in Nelson Mandela's international legacy. In 1981, the city became the first in the world to award Mandela the Freedom of the City, at a time when he remained imprisoned in South Africa for his role in the anti-apartheid struggle.

Mandela had been convicted in 1962 on charges including conspiring to commit acts of sabotage and guerrilla warfare and spent nearly 30 years in prison. In a symbolic act of solidarity, Glasgow City Council also renamed St George's Place — the location of South Africa's consulate-general to Nelson Mandela Place in 1981.

Following his release from prison in 1990, Mandela went on to become South Africa's first Black president. He visited Glasgow in 1993 to formally receive the Freedom of the City, addressing a crowd of approximately 10,000 people in George Square.

The statue was unveiled on 9 October 2026, marking the 33rd anniversary of Nelson Mandela’s visit to Glasgow.

== Reactions ==
Former football manager Sir Alex Ferguson has publicly backed the campaign. Ferguson met Nelson Mandela on three occasions, including at Mandela's home on his 88th birthday. He has highlighted Mandela's lack of bitterness after 27 years of imprisonment, praised Glasgow's role in the anti-apartheid movement, and described Mandela as an example for the world to follow.

== See also ==
- List of awards and honours bestowed on Nelson Mandela
- Statue of Nelson Mandela, Parliament Square
