= 2026 Edinburgh attacks =

Stabbing attacks in Edinburgh, Scotland

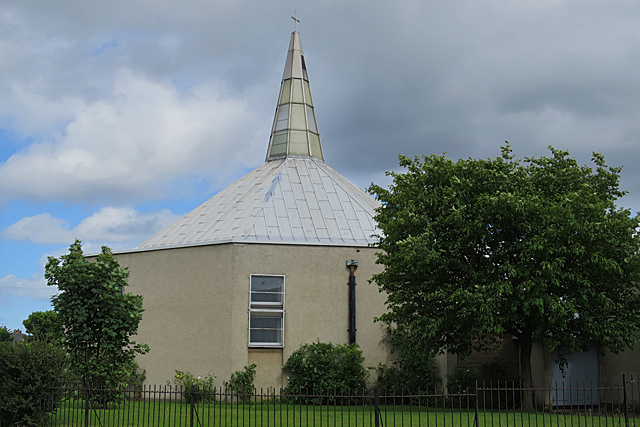
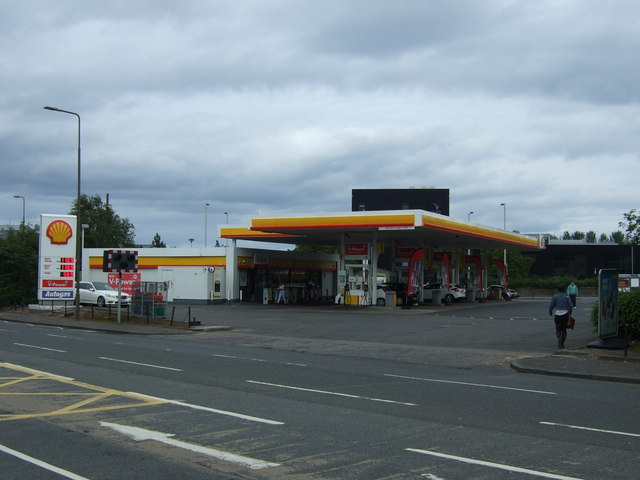
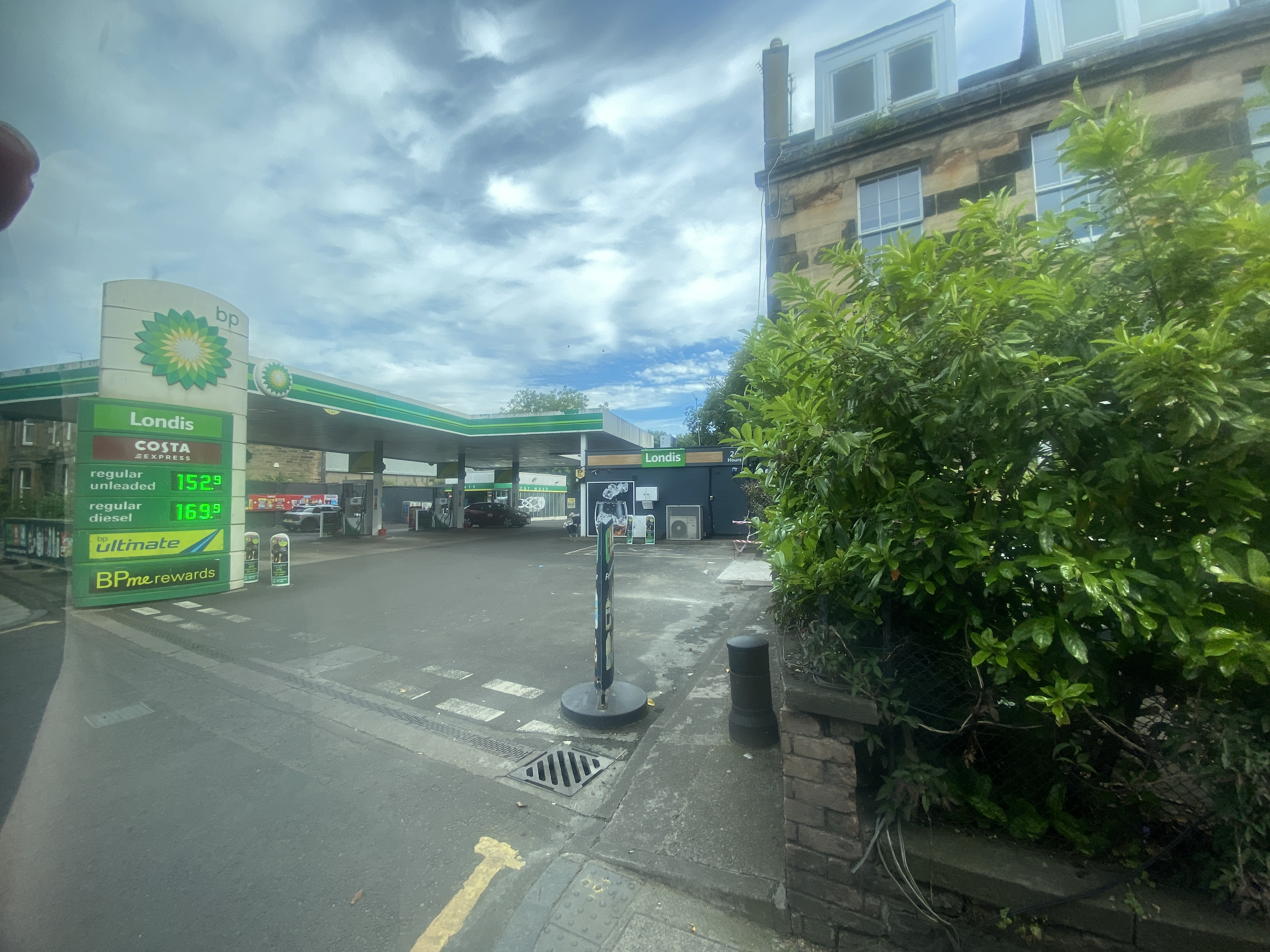
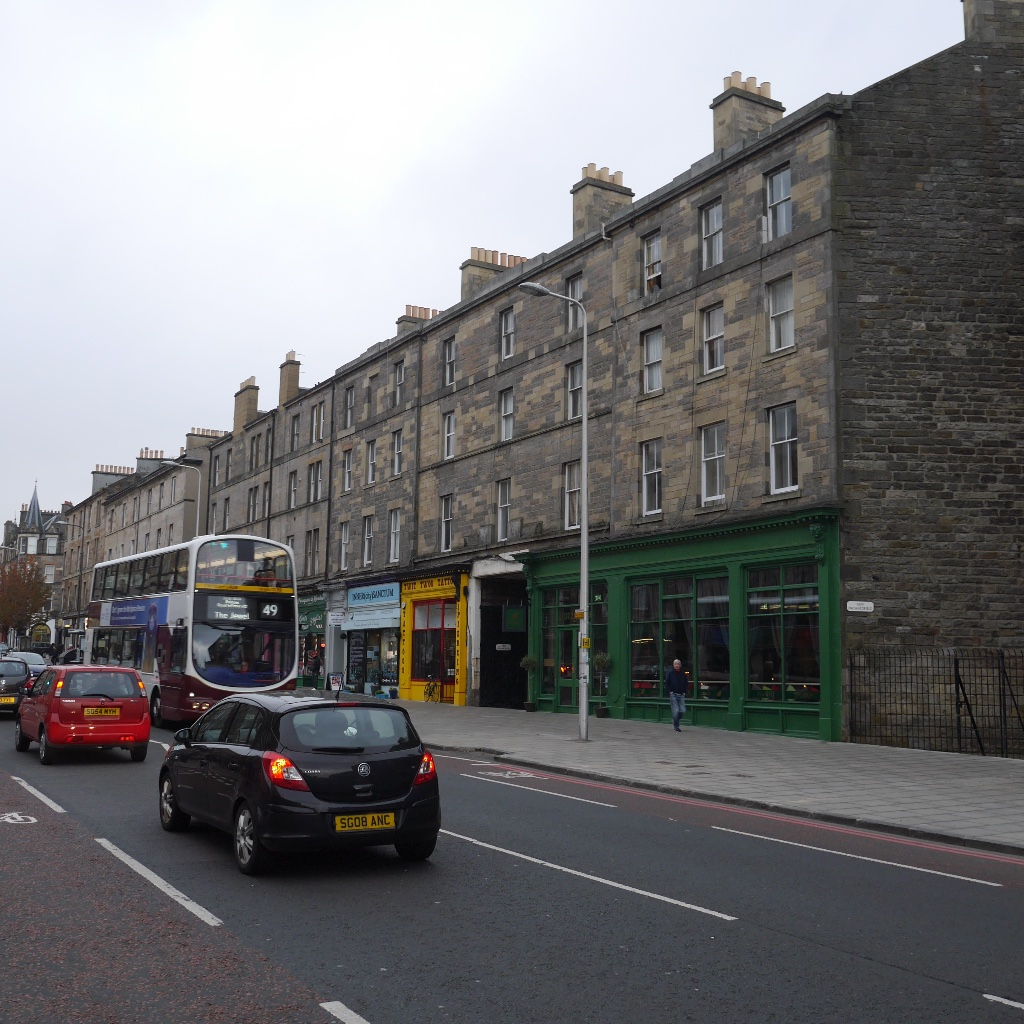
- Clockwise, from top left: Broomhouse Mosque, Telford Road petrol station, Leith Walk, and Ferry Road petrol station
- Location: Edinburgh, Scotland
- Date: 19 June 2026; 20:30–21:30 (BST (UTC+1))
- Target: Muslims
- Attack type: Stabbings
- Weapons: Knives, axe
- Deaths: 0
- Injuries: 5
- Charges: Attempted murder (5); Assault and robbery (1); Breach of the peace (2); Culpable and reckless conduct (2)

On 19 June 2026, a 36-year-old man allegedly carried out a series of stabbing attacks in Edinburgh, Scotland. Five men received non-life-threatening injuries. The suspect has been charged with terrorism related offences.

== Background ==
Anti-Muslim and anti-immigrant sentiment has been rising in the United Kingdom in recent years. A study by the British Future think tank and the British Muslim Trust found that one in six Britons considered the growth of the Muslim population to be "a foundational threat to UK culture" and that hostile attitudes towards Muslims risked being normalised. In early June 2026 there were far-right riots in Northern Ireland and Southampton. Edinburgh saw anti-immigrant demonstrations following the stabbing in Belfast perpetrated by a Sudanese man.

== Attacks ==
At around 8:30 pm on 19 June 2026 two 22-year-old men were stabbed multiple times at Sighthill Park in the south-west of Edinburgh. The victims had been attending Asr prayer at the nearby mosque in Broomhouse. Police were called to Sighthill at around 8:50 pm. Both men were taken to Edinburgh Royal Infirmary.

Police then received reports of attacks on shops in the west and north of Edinburgh. Video posted on social media showed a bare-chested man roaming the streets with a weapon. CCTV footage obtained by the BBC showed the man carrying two large knives.

Footage from 9:15 pm showed a taxi with its windows smashed and a hand axe on the seat at the Shell petrol station on Telford Road, about five miles from Sighthill. CCTV footage from the BP petrol station on Ferry Road showed a man standing next to a black vehicle with its windscreen smashed at 9:28 pm. The man entered the petrol station's kiosk where he damaged various fixtures and fittings. CCTV footage then shows the man abandoning a dark car on Leith Walk and chasing an e-bike on foot before returning to the car. He then leaves the car again and proceeds to attack a black man with the two large knives. He then went to the Origano pizzeria on Leith Walk and attacked the door repeatedly as staff closed the electronic shutters. A delivery driver on an e-bike was then attacked and a minicab had a window smashed. Three men were attacked in Telford Road and the Leith Walk area.

The suspect was arrested on Leith Walk at around 9:30 pm by police officers carrying tasers, though none were discharged. Footage of the arrest shared on social media appears to show the suspect shouting that he was "protecting the country from these fucking Muslim bastards raping our young daughters, raping our kids".

Five men – two aged 22 and three others aged 24, 27, and 39 – were injured in the attack. Four required hospital treatment but none suffered life threatening injuries. SAC and Muslim Engagement and Development (MEND) have said several of the victims were Muslims. The suspect appeared to target Muslims.

== Legal proceedings ==
A 36-year-old Scottish man, was charged with the attack. Counter terrorism officers joined Police Scotland in investigating the attacks.

The suspect appeared in Edinburgh Sheriff Court on 22 June 2026 to face five charges of attempted murder, one count of assault and robbery, two counts of breach of the peace and two counts of culpable and reckless conduct. All charges were "aggravated by reason of having a terrorist connection". He made no plea and was remanded in custody.

== Reactions ==
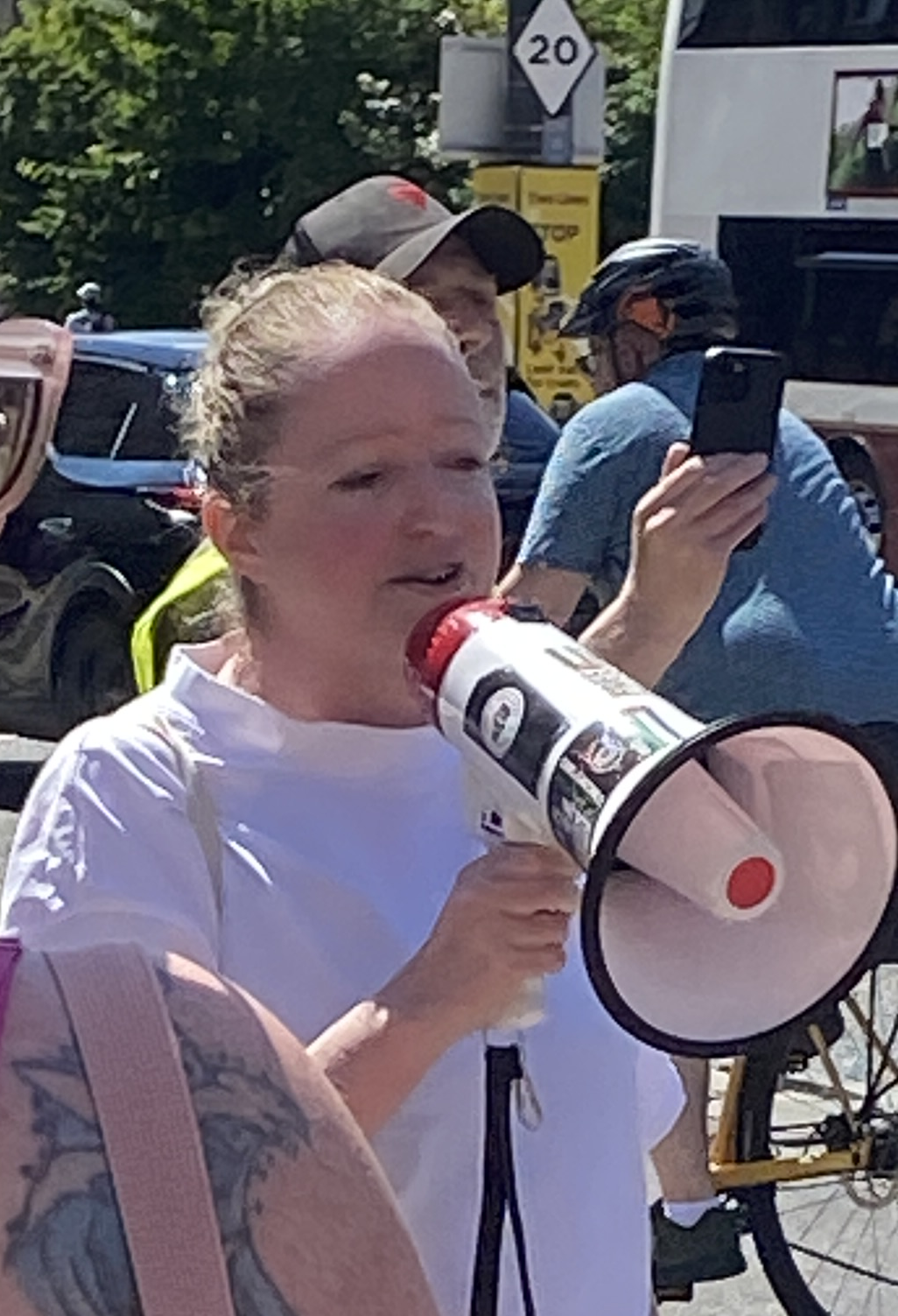
Green MSP Kate Nevens at a demonstration on 21 June 2026.

Scotland's First Minister John Swinney said he was concerned by the attacks and that "There is no place for violence, racism or intolerance in our country". UK Prime Minister Keir Starmer tweeted that he was appalled by the attacks and that "No one should face violence on our streets. The suspect appears to be motivated by anti-Muslim hatred". Home Secretary Shabana Mahmood said she was horrified by the attacks which appeared "to be motivated by anti-Muslim hatred" and that "There is no place for hatred and violence against Muslims".

The Muslim Council of Britain attributed the attacks directly to the "political rhetoric that demonises entire communities" and urged Muslims to "stay vigilant, look out for one another, and please report any Islamophobic hate crimes to the police". MEND urged the police to treat the attacks as "Islamophobic, far-right terror".

Former First Minister Humza Yousaf accused Restore Britain leader Rupert Lowe of making Muslims targets for violence through public remarks Yousaf described as dogwhistling. The Scottish Trades Union Congress (STUC) also released a statement describing the attack as "the product of right-wing forces, both in our politics and in our media, whipping people into a false frenzy of hatred and division". On 21 June, around 100 people gathered on Leith Walk for a demonstration of solidarity with the local community.
