= Riverside Park, Glasgow =

Public park in Glasgow, Scotland

Riverside Park
- Interactive map of Riverside Park
- Type: Public park
- Location: Glasgow, Scotland
- Coordinates: 55°51′51″N 4°18′36″W
- Area: 8.53 hectares (21.1 acres)
- Created: 27 March 2026
- Operator: Glasgow City Council
- Status: Open all year

Riverside Park is a public park located in the Govan area of Glasgow, Scotland, on the south bank of the River Clyde. Opened in March 2026, the park occupies part of the historic Govan Graving Docks site and represents a major milestone in the regeneration of Glasgow’s post-industrial waterfront.

== History ==
The site of Riverside Park was formerly part of the Govan Graving Docks, once a key component of Glasgow's shipbuilding sector. The docks closed in 1987 and remained derelict for nearly 40 years.

Riverside Park was officially opened to the public on 27 March 2026, marking the first time in nearly four decades that the site had been accessible. The opening followed a long campaign by local community groups and campaigners, often described as a "40-year fight" to reclaim the derelict waterfront for public use.

The park reconnects the district of Govan with the River Clyde, restoring access to an area historically associated with shipbuilding and maritime industry.

The park was delivered through a partnership involving the Govan Graving Docks Trust, site owners New City Vision, and Glasgow City Council.

Community input played a significant role in shaping the project, with an emphasis on creating a safe, accessible public space along the riverfront. The development is intended as an initial step toward broader regeneration plans, including restoration of historic structures such as the Pump House and improved connections across the Clyde.

== Location and features ==
The park is located on the south bank of the River Clyde in the west of Glasgow. The park occupies land reclaimed from former industrial use and provides open views across the river towards the city centre and north bank developments. Its riverside setting creates a corridor for local wildlife, while landscaped paths and seating areas make it a popular spot for walking, jogging and informal recreation.

The park is bordered to the west by the Riverside Museum and Glasgow Harbour development, to the east by Finnieston and the SEC Centre, and to the south by residential and commercial areas of Partick and Yorkhill. Its proximity to major transport links, including the Clydeside Expressway and nearby rail and subway stations, makes it easily accessible. The park also forms part of a wider network of pedestrian and cycle routes along the Clyde, linking the West End with the city centre.

Riverside Park is relatively flat compared to many of Glasgow's historic parks, reflecting its industrial past and subsequent redevelopment. Today, it serves as a modern public space that blends waterfront regeneration with leisure use, attracting residents, commuters and visitors throughout the year.
