= Michelle Ballantyne =

British Reform UK politician

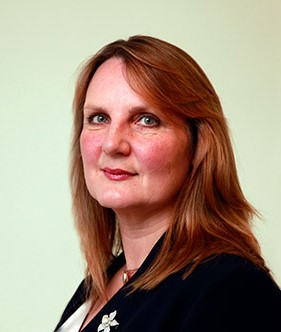
- Official portrait, 2017

Leader of Reform UK Scotland
- In office 11 January 2021 – 16 February 2022
- Leader: Nigel Farage; Richard Tice
- Preceded by: Office established
- Succeeded by: Malcolm Offord (Note: Office vacant from 16 February 2022 to 15 January 2026)

Convener of the Economy, Energy and Fair Work Committee
- In office 3 March 2020 – 20 August 2020
- Preceded by: Gordon Lindhurst
- Succeeded by: Gordon Lindhurst

Member of the Scottish Parliament for South Scotland (1 of 7 Regional MSPs)
- In office 23 May 2017 – 5 May 2021
- Preceded by: Rachael Hamilton (Note: Normally, regional MSPs do not have individual predecessors and successors. However, Hamilton retired her seat during a sitting parliament so was succeeded by Ballantyne.)
- Succeeded by: Craig Hoy

Scottish Conservative portfolios
- 2018–2020: Shadow Cabinet Secretary for Social Security

Personal details
- Born: Michelle Lorraine Cross; 28 November 1962 (age 63) Ashton-under-Lyne, England
- Party: Advance UK (2026)
- Other political affiliations: Independent (2020–2021); Conservative (until 2020); Reform UK (2021–2025)
- Education: Royal London Hospital; Heriot-Watt University
- Occupation: Property developer; politician; nurse

Michelle Lorraine Ballantyne (née Cross; born 28 November 1962) is a British property developer, former politician and former nurse who served as Leader of Reform UK Scotland from January 2021 to February 2022. She was a Member of the Scottish Parliament (MSP) for the South Scotland region from 2017 to 2021, having been elected for the Scottish Conservatives.

Born in Ashton-under-Lyne, Ballantyne studied at Royal London Hospital before working as a staff nurse and health service manager in London. She moved to the Scottish Borders in 1990 and established a manufacturing business there with her husband. After graduating with an honours degree from Heriot-Watt University, she managed an acute medicine department in Edinburgh and took a position at a charity supporting people struggling with drugs and alcohol.

Elected to Scottish Borders Council in 2012, Ballantyne took a seat in the Scottish Parliament in 2017 on the Scottish Conservative regional list. She was a candidate in the February 2020 leadership election but lost to Jackson Carlaw. She resigned from the party in November 2020 in protest at its support for coronavirus lockdown measures. After sitting as an independent, she joined Reform UK in January 2021 and was appointed as Leader of Reform UK Scotland. She lost her seat in the 2021 Scottish Parliament election and quit as the leader of Reform UK in Scotland in February 2022.

== Early life and career ==
Ballantyne was born in Ashton-under-Lyne, Lancashire. She studied nursing at Royal London Hospital in East London, beginning her career working as a staff nurse in an intensive care unit before progressing into a finance and management position at South West Thames Regional Health Authority.

Ballantyne moved to the Scottish Borders in 1990 to establish a manufacturing business with her husband in Walkerburn. During this period, she continued to work as a nurse within social care, while also completing an Honours degree as a mature student at Heriot-Watt University in Galashiels. After graduation, she returned to health service management in 2000, managing an acute medicine department in Edinburgh.

Ballantyne and her husband sold their house and became tenants to enable her to work closer to home. Ballantyne took a position in 2005 as head of an independent local charity providing specialist drug and alcohol support to children, families and offenders.

== Political career ==
=== Local government: 2012–2017 ===
While a member of the Scottish Conservatives, Ballantyne was first elected to Scottish Borders Council at the 2012 council election as one of three representatives for Selkirkshire. She contested the Midlothian South, Tweeddale and Lauderdale constituency at the 2016 Scottish Parliament election but finished second place behind Christine Grahame.

Ballantyne led the Conservative group into the 2017 Scottish Borders Council election. The Conservatives gained five seats at the election and subsequently entered into a coalition with the independent group to take control of the council from the incumbent SNP, Liberal Democrat and independent administration.

=== Scottish Conservatives: 2017–2020 ===
In May 2017, Ballantyne was invited to join the Scottish Parliament on the Scottish Conservative regional list and was sworn in as an MSP on 23 May. She replaced Rachael Hamilton, who had resigned her seat to contest the 2017 Ettrick, Roxburgh and Berwickshire by-election held on 8 June. Shortly after she joined the Scottish Parliament, Ballantyne was appointed by Ruth Davidson to the Scottish Conservative frontbench in the role of Shadow Minister for Childcare and Early Years.

On 3 May 2018, Ballantyne was promoted to Shadow Cabinet Secretary for Social Security. She defended the UK government's two child cap on tax credits in October of that year, claiming it had been fairer to working people having to make decisions about the number of children to have. Her comments sparked heated debate and she accused the SNP of politicising the cap. During her tenure as Shadow Social Security Secretary, she also said there was "no such thing as a bedroom tax", disagreeing that restricting benefits was equivalent to a tax, and claimed there was no hard evidence as to why the use of foodbanks had increased.

Criticising the SNP's record on healthcare within a speech in the Scottish Parliament, Ballantyne said she would be "quite happy" if the Scottish Government had no role in running the National Health Service in Scotland.

Ballantyne campaigned to change the law to allow assisted dying for consenting terminally ill people in her role as chair of the end of life choices working group, progressing on previous campaign work by Margo MacDonald.

Ballantyne was a candidate in the first Scottish Conservative Party leadership election of 2020. During the campaign, her stance on the two child cap was brought up but she defended her views. She eventually lost the leadership election to Jackson Carlaw. She was dropped from Carlaw's Shadow Cabinet in a reshuffle shortly after the election. On 18 February, Carlaw told ITV's Representing Borders that Ballantyne would be moved to a new key position. On 3 March, she assumed office as convener of the Economy, Energy and Fair Work Committee.

=== Reform UK: 2020–2025 ===
On 24 November 2020, Ballantyne announced she would leave the Scottish Conservatives to sit as an independent MSP, citing differences on policies and principles with the party and its new leader Douglas Ross, especially with regards to the party's support for coronavirus lockdown measures; she said that she and the party were no longer "a good fit". Her resignation and subsequent criticisms of lockdowns in Scotland won her support from former MSP and MEP Brian Monteith.

Ballantyne joined Reform UK in January 2021 and was appointed as Leader of Reform UK Scotland. She said the party would advocate low taxes, entrepreneurship and policies reflecting personal choice and local communities. Chairman Richard Tice added the party would stand at the 2021 Scottish Parliament election on a platform of devolving powers to local government. In February, she reiterated her criticisms of lockdowns and wrote a column for The Scotsman arguing the damage to the mental health of children and young people had been disproportionate to the benefits of controlling coronavirus.

Ballantyne lost her seat in the 2021 Scottish Parliament election. She received 779 votes (0.2%) of the vote and was not returned to Holyrood.

In February 2022 she quit her position as the leader of Reform UK in Scotland and announced she was quitting her role in politics to focus on a multimillion-pound restoration of The Haining country house.

She was suspended from and then quit her membership of Reform UK in January 2025 after it was revealed she was the administrator of a Facebook page that featured racist and far-right posts. In January 2026, she became the Scotland director for Advance UK, a splinter party of Reform led by Ben Habib. She joined a number of party executives including Tim Power.

== Personal life ==
The eldest of four siblings, Ballantyne has been married to her husband Neil since December 1983 and together they have six children. Neil is a former officer in the King's Own Scottish Borderers. She is managing trustee of The Haining, a patron of a food bank in Penicuik and a council member of Friends at the End.

Starting in 2000, Ballantyne was an adult volunteer in the Air Training Corps and she received a commission as a pilot officer in the Royal Air Force Volunteer Reserve (Training Branch). Two years later, she was promoted to flying officer. Ballantyne resigned her commission in June 2003.
