= Loch Leven =

Loch Leven may refer to:

== Bodies of water in Scotland ==
- Loch Leven (Kinross), a freshwater loch in Perth and Kinross
  - Lochleven Castle, a fortress on the loch
  - William Douglas of Lochleven, later the 6th Earl of Morton
- Loch Leven (Highlands), a sea loch on the west coast of Scotland, south of Fort William

== Lakes and places elsewhere ==
- Loch Leven, Newfoundland and Labrador, a lake and inhabited place in Newfoundland and Labrador, Canada
- Loch Leven, Saskatchewan, a hamlet in Saskatchewan, Canada
- Loch Leven (Saskatchewan), a lake in Saskatchewan, Canada
- Loch Leven (California), a lake in California, U.S.

== Other ==
- "Loch Leven", a song by Arab Strap from Monday at the Hug and Pint
