= Leader of Reform UK Scotland =

- Incumbent; The Lord Offord of Garvel since 15 January 2026
- Style: Party Leader
- Formation: 11 January 2021 (original); 15 January 2026 (current)
- First holder: Michelle Ballantyne

The Leader of Reform UK Scotland is the most senior position within the wing of Reform UK in Scotland. The current holder is former Conservative Party minister Lord Offord of Garvel, who was appointed leader on 15 January 2026.

From 11 January 2021 to 16 February 2022, the office was first held by Michelle Ballantyne, who had resigned from the Scottish Conservatives in November 2020 before sitting as an independent MSP. She then lost her seat in the 2021 Scottish Parliament election. From 2022 until 2026, the Leader of Reform UK Scotland remained vacant with the Leader of Reform UK acting as the party's leader nationwide. On the 15 January 2026, Malcolm Offord, a former Conservative peer and junior minister, was appointed Leader.

== List ==
No.	Leader	Portrait	Former party	Took office	Left office	Scottish Parliament Elections	Tenure	Scottish Parliament Constituency	Reform UK Leader	First Minister
1	Michelle Ballantyne		Scottish Conservatives	11 January 2021	16 February 2022	2021 (lost seat)	1 year, 36 days	South Scotland	Nigel Farage (22 March 2019 –6 March 2021)	Nicola Sturgeon
1	Michelle Ballantyne		Scottish Conservatives	11 January 2021	16 February 2022	2021 (lost seat)	1 year, 36 days	South Scotland	Richard Tice (6 March 2021–3 June 2024)	Nicola Sturgeon
Office vacant (16 February 2022 – 15 January 2026)
2	Malcolm Offord		Scottish Conservatives	15 January 2026	Incumbent	2026	279 days	House of Lords (15 – 30 January 2026) West Scotland (7 May 2026 – present)	Nigel Farage (3 June 2024 –Incumbent)	John Swinney

== Deputy leader ==
No.	Deputy Leader	Portrait	Former party	Took office	Left office	Scottish Parliament Elections	Scottish Parliament Constituency	Tenure	Reform UK Scotland Leader	Reform UK Leader	First Minister
1	Thomas Kerr		Scottish Conservatives	9 May 2026	Incumbent	2026	Glasgow	165 days	Malcolm Offord	Nigel Farage	John Swinney
