= Kirking of the parliament =

Scottish parliamentary ceremony

The kirking of the parliament is a modern-day blessing ceremony, adapted from those performed in the original Parliament of Scotland which was founded in the Middle Ages and adjourned in 1707. It was re-introduced as a multi-faith service to coincide with the opening of the Scottish Parliament which was devolved from the United Kingdom Parliament and reconvened in 1999. It takes place every 5 years.

== Composition ==
The Kirking is led by the Minister of St Giles' Cathedral, Edinburgh, while the sermon is given by the Moderator of the General Assembly of the Church of Scotland. The services have typically consisted of readings from the Bible, the Qur'an, and Jewish prayers, and are concluded by an act of commendation. Following the 2026 Scottish Parliament election, the Kirking involved a representative of the Scottish Pagan community, for the first time.

== Attendance ==
The service is attended by the leaders of all the main parties and previous Kirkings have been attended by the Duke of Rothesay, musicians from the Royal Scottish Academy of Music and Drama (now the Royal Conservatoire of Scotland) and the National Youth Orchestra of Scotland, as well as lobbyists.
