= Enlighten (Scotland think tank) =

Edinburgh-based think tank

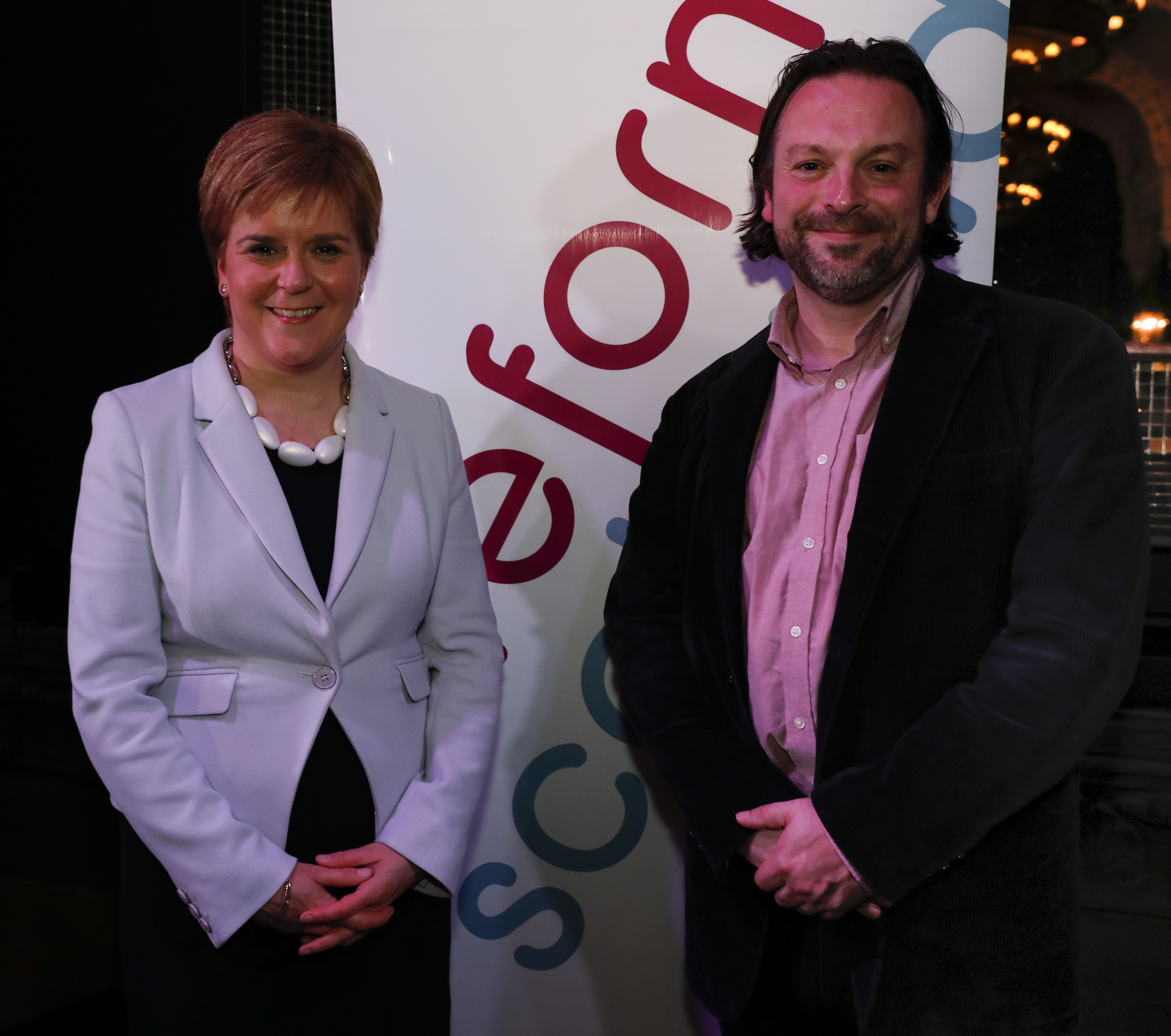
First Minister Nicola Sturgeon with Reform Scotland's director Chris Deerin in 2019

Enlighten is a Scottish think tank based in Edinburgh. Established in 2008 as Reform Scotland, Enlighten is the successor to think tank Policy Institute (1999–2008).

Enlighten is a company limited by guarantee (No SC336414) and a Scottish charity (No SC039624) funded by individuals, charitable trusts, companies and organisations that share its aims.

In November 2022, the funding transparency website Who Funds You? rated Enlighten (then Reform Scotland) as E, the lowest transparency rating (rating goes from A to E).

Enlighten made a submission to the Scotland Bill Committee, based upon their pamphlet advocating Devolution Plus. Devolution Plus is a system whereby the Scottish devolution settlement would be amended to see both the Scottish Parliament and Westminster parliament raising sufficient revenue in taxation to fund their own spending. That submission was the basis of the foundation of the Devo Plus group, to promote the idea during the run up to a referendum on Scottish independence.

In 2012, Enlighten won 'one to watch' at Prospect magazine's annual think tank awards in London as well as runner up in the economic and financial category.

== Key members of staff ==
- Chris Deerin, Director (Scotland Editor for the New Statesman, former Head of Comment at The Telegraph, former Executive Editor of Scotland on Sunday, former Daily Mail columnist).
- Alison Payne (née Miller), research director (former political adviser to Scottish Conservatives leader Annabel Goldie, former head of research for the Scottish Conservatives, unsuccessful Conservative candidate for Portobello/Craigmillar in the 2007 Scottish local elections).

== Trustees ==
The trustees of Enlighten are:

- Jack McConnell, Chairman
- Geraldine Gammell
- Sinclair Dunlop
- Kevin Pringle
- Sandy Kennedy

Previous trustees of Enlighten included:

- Alan McFarlane, Chairman
- Isobel d'Inverno
- Siobhan Mathers
