= Archie Macdonald =

British politician (1904–1983)

- Archie Macdonald

Member of Parliament for Roxburgh and Selkirk
- In office 1950-1951

Personal details
- Born: 2 May 1904 Uniondale, Western Cape, South Africa
- Died: 20 April 1983 (aged 78)
- Party: Conservative (after 1970); Liberal (1945-70)
- Spouse: Elspeth Shaw (m. 1945)
- Children: 2
- Education: Royal Australian Naval College

Archibald James Florence "Archie" Macdonald (2 May 1904 – 20 April 1983) was a Scottish Liberal and later Conservative politician, who also had a career in business.

== Early life and career ==
Macdonald was born in Uniondale, Western Cape in South Africa. His father was of an eye surgeon who came originally from Aberdeen. The family then moved to Australia, where Macdonald received his education at Chatswood Grammar School, near Sydney, New South Wales and the Royal Australian Naval College. During the 1920s, he was a successful wool buyer, and when he came to Britain in the 1930s, he and his brother set up their own business importing Australian fruits. He volunteered for service in 1939, but was turned down, as he had a serious thyroid problem. In 1945, he married the Hon. Elspeth Ruth Shaw, younger daughter of Alexander Shaw, 2nd Baron Craigmyle, who had been a Liberal Member of Parliament (MP). They had two sons.

== Businessman ==
In his business career, Macdonald was Joint Chief Executive of Management Research Groups, London, between 1937 and 1940, Secretary of the Paint Industry Export Group, 1940–47, Director and Secretary of the Wartime Paint Manufacturers' Association, 1943–45; Director of Robert Bowran & Co. Ltd, a paint manufacturers from 1949 to 1953, and from 1956 onwards he was Director of Joseph Freeman Sons & Co. Ltd. (which later became Cementone), serving as vice-chairman from 1962 to 1966.

== Liberal MP ==
Before the 1945 general election, Macdonald had not been active in politics, but he was persuaded to stand as a Liberal candidate by George Grey, the Member of Parliament for Berwick-upon-Tweed, who had heard him speak at a business meeting. Macdonald was adopted for Roxburgh and Selkirk because he had some history in the cloth trade and the constituency was a great textile and clothing area, specialising in high quality tweeds and knit wear. The seat had been held for the Conservatives by Lord William Montagu-Douglas-Scott since 1935, and was something of a family fiefdom, as Lord William had succeeded his brother, the Earl of Dalkeith, who had been MP there since 1923.

The Tories were particularly entrenched in the rural areas where the lairds held sway. It was a three-cornered contest with a strong showing from Labour, but Scott held on with a majority of 1,628 votes. Macdonald nursed the constituency over the next few years and fought it again at the 1950 election. This time, probably assisted by the increased turnout, he unseated Scott, winning by a majority of 1,156. It was to be a short lived triumph, however, as the outcome of the general election, a small overall Labour majority in Parliament, did not prove sufficient for the government to carry on for a full Parliamentary term, and Clement Attlee called an election in October 1951. Macdonald was unable to retain his seat, losing by the narrow margin of 829 votes to a new Conservative candidate.

The foundations of a Liberal revival had been laid in the Borders, however. The Liberals held on to their second place in Roxburgh and Selkirk and its successor constituency Roxburgh, Selkirk and Peebles, until they captured the seat again at a by-election in 1965 won by David Steel, a future leader of the party.

== Politics and policy ==
Also elected for the first time in 1950 was another future Liberal leader Jo Grimond in Orkney & Shetland. He and Macdonald were the party's Scottish MPs, and they worked together on Scottish issues. Notably, both Grimond and MacDonald devoted their maiden speeches in the House of Commons to devolution. Grimond claimed that the subject would not have been raised in Parliament at that time if it had not been for him and Macdonald.

Because of his business background, Macdonald was appointed to speak for the Liberals on economic affairs, a portfolio he looked after diligently during his brief stay in Parliament, and he became strongly associated with the policy of co-ownership in industry.

Macdonald was also involved in the struggle for the ideological soul of the Liberal Party which was taking place at this time. Many Liberals were concerned that, in the years after the Second World War, under the leadership of Clement Davies, the party was falling unduly under the sway of classical, free-market liberals and was drifting to the right.

Under the influence of economic Liberals such as Oliver Smedley and Arthur Seldon, who helped establish the Institute of Economic Affairs, the think tank which was to later become an engine of Thatcherism, the Liberal ship was coming loose from the New Liberal anchors it had adopted from the 1890s and reinforced in the 1920s with the Lloyd George, Keynes and Beveridge inspired coloured books. The drift to the right so alarmed many left wing Liberals that many chose to abandon the party and join Labour, chief among them being the MPs or former MPs Lady Megan Lloyd George, Dingle Foot, Tom Horabin and Edgar Granville. However, others chose to fight from within, and in 1952 the Radical Reform Group was set up. Macdonald was a signatory of a letter to The Guardian of 27 March 1953 which announced the formation of the Group, and he remained associated with it through the 1950s.

== Politics after parliament ==
Macdonald continued to play an active role in Liberal politics after his defeat in 1951, but never stood for Parliament again, despite requests from local Liberals in the Borders to contest the expanded Roxburgh, Selkirk and Peebles seat. However, in 1964, after David Steel's promising showing in the seat at the general election, Macdonald suggested he put his name forward again. Despite this, the local Liberals stuck with Steel.

Macdonald instead turned successfully to local government. He was elected as a councillor on the Metropolitan Borough of Hampstead in London, where he lived, and was Liberal Group Leader from 1962 to 1965. However, Macdonald failed to get elected to the Greater London Council in 1964, or to the new London Borough of Camden. In the aftermath of the 1970 general election, he left the Liberals, and joined the Conservative Party, although he never completely felt comfortable in his new political skin. In 1971, Macdonald was elected as a Camden councillor for the Conservative Party in Hampstead Town, and served until his resignation in 1976. He was also a Justice of the Peace.

Parliament of the United Kingdom
Preceded by Lord William Montagu Douglas Scott	Member of Parliament for Roxburgh and Selkirk; 1950 – 1951	Succeeded by Charles Donaldson
