= Anglo-Afghan Treaty =

- Anglo-Afghan Treaty of 1855 in Peshawar
- Anglo-Afghan Treaty of 1879 in Gandamak
- Anglo-Afghan Treaty of 1893 in Kabul
- Anglo-Afghan Treaty of 1919 in Rawalpindi
