= Battle of Britain (disambiguation) =

The Battle of Britain was a Second World War campaign in which the German Luftwaffe and British Royal Air Force fought for air superiority.

Battle of Britain or Battle for Britain may also refer to:

== Video games ==
- Battle of Britain (1985 video game)
- Their Finest Hour: The Battle of Britain, a 1989 video game
- Battle of Britain (1999 video game)
- Rowan's Battle of Britain, a 2000 video game

== Other uses ==
- Battle of Britain (film), a 1969 film by Guy Hamilton
- The Battle of Britain, a 1943 propaganda film by Frank Capra
- Battle for Britain (Private Eye), a Private Eye comic strip
- Battle of Britain class, a class of steam locomotives formerly used on railways in southern England
- Battle of Britain (painting), a 1941 painting by Paul Nash
- Lennox Lewis vs. Frank Bruno or Battle of Britain, a 1993 boxing match
- Carl Froch vs. George Groves or Battle of Britain, a 2013 boxing match
- Battle of Britain, Northfleet, an illegally demolished pub in Kent, England

== See also ==
- Battle of Britain Memorial (disambiguation)
- Anglo-Saxon invasion of Britain from the 5th to 7th centuries
- Caesar's invasions of Britain in 55 and 54 BC
- Invasion of England
- List of wars involving Britain
- Roman conquest of Britain Starting in 44 AD and ending in 96 AD
