= Walter Montagu-Douglas-Scott, 8th Duke of Buccleuch =

British peer and Conservative politician

His Grace The Duke of Buccleuch and Queensberry KT GCVO TD PC
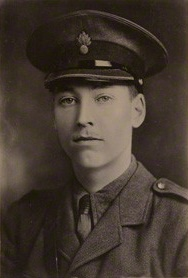

Personal details
- Born: 30 December 1894
- Died: 4 October 1973 (aged 78)
- Spouse: Mary Lascelles (m. 1921)
- Children: Elizabeth Percy, Duchess of Northumberland; John Montagu Douglas Scott, 9th Duke of Buccleuch; Caroline Gilmour, Baroness Gilmour of Craigmillar
- Parents: John Montagu Douglas Scott, 7th Duke of Buccleuch; Lady Margaret Bridgeman

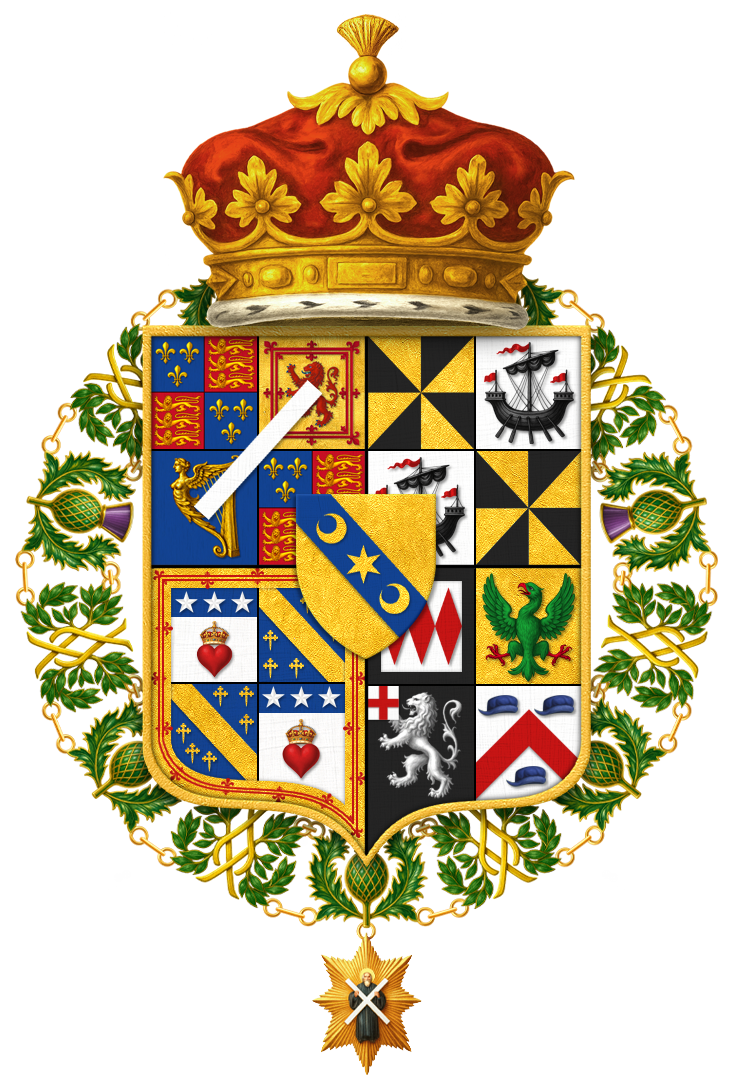
Shield of Arms of Walter John Montagu Douglas Scott, 8th Duke of Buccleuch and 10th Duke of Queensberry, KT, GCVO, TD, PC

Walter John Montagu Douglas Scott, 8th Duke of Buccleuch and 10th Duke of Queensberry, KT, GCVO, TD, PC (30 December 1894 – 4 October 1973) was a British peer and Conservative politician.

== Early life and education ==
Walter John Montagu Douglas Scott was born on 30 December 1894 the son of John Montagu Douglas Scott, 7th Duke of Buccleuch and Lady Margaret Alice "Molly" Bridgeman, the daughter of George Bridgeman, 4th Earl of Bradford and Lady Ida Annabella Frances Lumley. His sister, Alice, married Prince Henry, Duke of Gloucester (one of the paternal uncles of Queen Elizabeth II) in 1935, becoming a member of the British Royal Family. Walter was a direct male-line descendant of Charles II of England.

Montagu Douglas Scott was educated at Eton College and Christ Church, Oxford. As a student at Oxford he was a member the Bullingdon Club a socially exclusive all-male dining club for Oxford University students. He had a military career commanding the 4th King's Own Scottish Borderers. He was also Captain-General of the Royal Company of Archers.

== Political activity ==
As Earl of Dalkeith, Scott was Scottish Unionist Party Member of Parliament (MP) for Roxburghshire and Selkirkshire from 1923 until 1935, when he succeeded as Duke of Buccleuch and Duke of Queensberry. He was succeeded as MP for the constituency by his brother, Lord William Scott. According to Cowling, he met German ambassador Joachim von Ribbentrop in London. Seen as pro-German, he was compelled to 'resign' as Lord Steward by King George VI. He had attended Hitler's 50th birthday celebration in 1939, and he opposed war with Germany; once war broke out, he campaigned for a truce allowing Hitler to keep all of his conquered territory.

Scott inaugurated a racist campaign against workers in the British Honduran Forestry Unit who had come to Scotland to help in the war effort. He complained that the workers were lazy but also was concerned that some had married local women. Harold Macmillan, Under-Secretary of State for the Colonies replied to his complaints by suggesting that the problem was more the extreme cold the Hondurans encountered and was quite different from their tropical homeland.

== Personal life ==
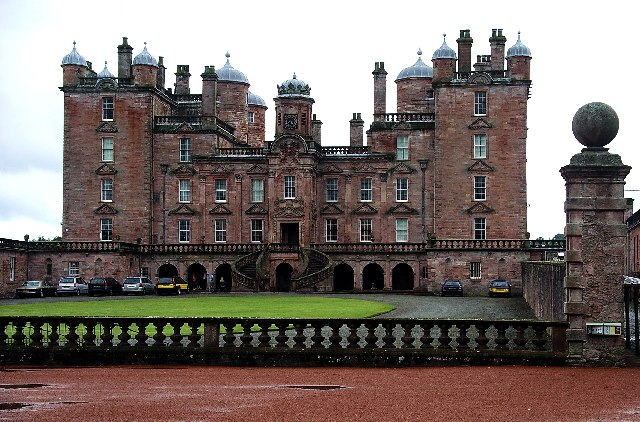
Drumlanrig Castle, Dumfries and Galloway - a seat of the Dukes of Buccleuch

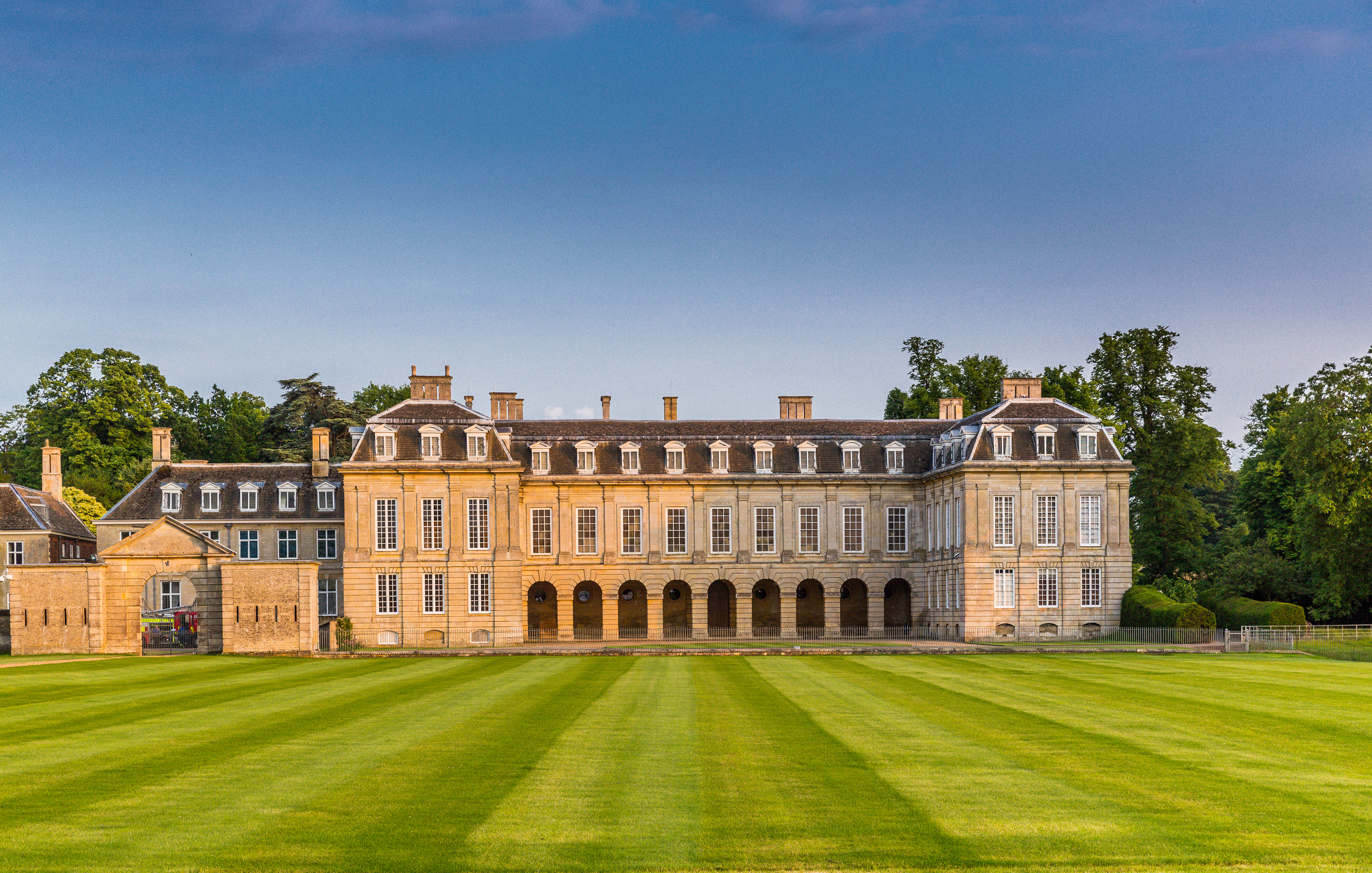
Boughton House, Northamptonshire - a seat of the Dukes of Buccleuch

He married Vreda Esther Mary Lascelles, granddaughter of William Beauclerk, 10th Duke of St Albans, on 21 April 1921. They have three children, sixteen grandchildren, forty-four great-grandchildren and two great-great-grandchildren:

- Lady Elizabeth Montagu Douglas Scott (20 January 1922 – 19 September 2012); she married Hugh Percy, 10th Duke of Northumberland, on 12 June 1946. They had seven children and seventeen grandchildren.
- John Montagu Douglas Scott, 9th Duke of Buccleuch (28 September 1923 – 4 September 2007); he married Jane McNeill on 10 January 1953. They have four children, ten grandchildren and two great-grandchildren.
- Lady Caroline Montagu Douglas Scott (7 November 1927 – 17 October 2004); she married Ian Gilmour (later created a life peer as Baron Gilmour of Craigmillar), on 10 July 1951. They have five children, including historian David Gilmour, classical conductor Oliver Gilmour, and United Nations official Andrew Gilmour; and seventeen grandchildren, including Tim Bouverie.

He died on 4 October 1973 and was buried among the ruins of Melrose Abbey.

== Sources ==
Maurice Cowling, The Impact of Hitler - British Politics & Policy 1933–1940, Cambridge University Press, 1975, p. 403, ISBN 0-521-20582-4

Parliament of the United Kingdom
Preceded by Sir Thomas Henderson	Member of Parliament for Roxburgh and Selkirk; 1923 – 1935	Succeeded by Lord William Walter Montagu; Douglas Scott
Political offices
Preceded by The Duke of Sutherland	Lord Steward; 1937–1940	Succeeded by The Duke of Hamilton
Preceded by Lord Elphinstone	Lord Clerk Register; 1956–1973	Succeeded by The Earl of Wemyss
Honorary titles
Preceded by The Duke of Roxburghe	Lord Lieutenant of Roxburghshire; 1932–1973	Succeeded by The Duke of Buccleuch
Preceded by The Earl of Airlie	Chancellor of the Order of the Thistle; 1966–1973	Succeeded by Sir Alec Douglas-Home
Peerage of Scotland
Preceded by John Montagu Douglas Scott	Duke of Buccleuch; 2nd creation 1935–1973	Succeeded by John Scott
Preceded by John Montagu Douglas Scott	Duke of Queensberry; 1935–1973	Succeeded by John Scott
