= William Montagu-Douglas-Scott =

British Army officer and politician (1896–1958)

William Montagu Douglas Scott MC

Lord

Member of Parliament for Roxburgh and Selkirk
- In office 1935–1950

Personal details
- Born: William Walter Montagu Douglas Scott; 17 January 1896
- Died: 30 January 1958 (aged 62)
- Party: Unionist Party
- Spouse: Rachel Douglas Home (m. 1937)
- Children: 5
- Parent: John Montagu Douglas Scott (father)
- Relatives: William Montagu Douglas Scott (brother); Alice Montagu Douglas Scott (sister); William Montagu Douglas Scott (grandfather); Louisa Hamilton (grandmother)
- Education: Royal Military College
- Military career
- Allegiance: United Kingdom
- Rank: Lieutenant-Colonel
- Unit: 10th Hussars
- Conflicts: World War I World War II
- Awards: Military Cross

Lieutenant-Colonel Lord William Walter Montagu Douglas Scott MC (17 January 1896 – 30 January 1958) was a British aristocrat and politician.

== Early life ==
The 2nd son of John Montagu Douglas Scott, 7th Duke of Buccleuch. His sister was Princess Alice, Duchess of Gloucester (1901–2004) and he was a godfather to her son, Prince William of Gloucester (1941–1972).

He was educated at Eton College and at the Royal Military College, Sandhurst.

== Career ==
He was commissioned into the 10th Hussars Promoted to lieutenant in 1915, he won the Military Cross in 1918, and was shortly afterwards promoted to captain. The citation for his MC, which appeared in The London Gazette in September 1918, reads as follows:

For conspicuous gallantry and devotion to duty. This officer was out with a patrol during a heavy attack by the enemy on a wood, which was believed to have been taken. He pushed forward to the wood in full view of the enemy and under heavy shell and machine-gun fire. Having entered the wood he found it unoccupied, so remained out, noting the enemy's dispositions until compelled to retire to avoid being surrounded when he brought back valuable information.

From 1925 to 1926 he was ADC to the Governor-General of Canada. He retired in 1927. He rejoined the Army in the Second World War, serving in Italy and reaching the rank of lieutenant colonel.

He was Unionist Member of Parliament (MP) for Roxburgh and Selkirk from 1935 to 1950, taking over the seat from his elder brother Walter on the death of their father. He was a Deputy Lieutenant of Roxburghshire from 1945.

== Personal life ==
In 1937 he married his second cousin once removed, Lady Rachel Douglas Home (10 April 1910 – 4 Apr 1996), younger daughter of Charles Douglas-Home, 13th Earl of Home. The couple were both descended from James Hamilton, 1st Duke of Abercorn, and Henry Scott, 3rd Duke of Buccleuch, and they had one son and four daughters, and lived at Eildon Hall, St Boswells, Roxburghshire.

Parliament of the United Kingdom
Preceded by Earl of Dalkeith	Member of Parliament for Roxburgh and Selkirk; 1935–1950	Succeeded by Archibald James Florence Macdonald
