= 1965 Roxburgh, Selkirk and Peebles by-election =

UK by-election

- 24 March 1965

Constituency of Roxburgh, Selkirk and Peebles
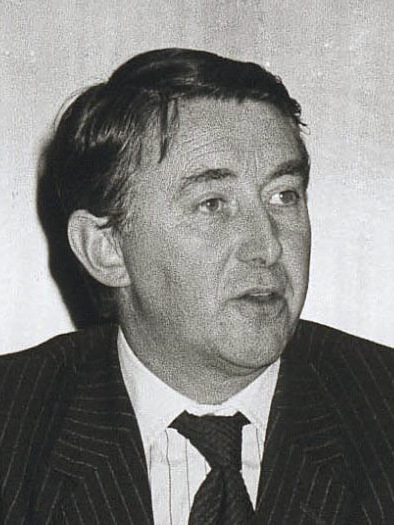
	First party	Second party	Third party
		Con	Lab
Candidate	David Steel	Robert McEwen	Ronald Murray
Party	Liberal	Conservative	Labour
Popular vote	21,549	16,942	4,936
Percentage	49.2%	38.6%	11.2%
Swing	▲10.4%	▼4.2%	▼4.6%
MP before election
Charles Donaldson
Conservative
Subsequent MP
David Steel
Liberal

The 1965 Roxburgh, Selkirk and Peebles by-election took place following the death of the incumbent member of parliament, Charles Edward McArthur Donaldson. It was won by David Steel, who went on to lead the Liberal Party, making it a milestone in the revival of the party's political fortunes from their nadir in the 1950s.

== Background ==
Roxburgh, Selkirk and Peebles, a large rural constituency in the Scottish borders, had been safely Conservative for many years. The Liberal Party's 26-year-old candidate David Steel had dramatically cut Commander Charles Donaldson's majority in the general election of October 1964. When Donaldson died some months later it was clear that the ensuing by-election represented an opportunity for the Liberals to repeat previous by-election triumphs in Torrington and Orpington. However, the Conservatives were now in opposition rather than in government and the party's standing in the constituency was thought to have been further bolstered as their leader, Sir Alec Douglas-Home was himself a Scot, representing the rather similar constituency of Kinross and West Perthshire to the north.

== Result ==
The election was held on Wednesday 24 March 1965. The result was a major defeat for the Conservatives. The votes cast were as follows:

Roxburgh, Selkirk and Peebles By-Election March 1965
Party	Candidate	Votes	%	±%
Liberal	David Steel	21,549	49.2	+10.4
Conservative	Robert L McEwen	16,942	38.6	−4.2
Labour	Ronald K Murray	4,936	11.2	−4.6
Independent Scottish Nationalist	Anthony Kerr	411	0.9	−1.6
Majority		4,607	10.6	N/A
Turnout		43,838	81.5	−0.7
Liberal gain from Conservative		Swing	+7.3	

== Reaction ==
This defeat was seen as a huge setback for the Conservatives, coming on top of their defeat in the general election the previous year and wiping out the boost they had received in the 1965 Leyton by-election. Douglas-Home resigned as leader shortly afterwards, and in the first election for party leader from amongst the Conservative MPs, was replaced by Edward Heath.

After his victory, Steel said that Douglas-Home was the only leading figure in the Conservatives who could "take some comfort from the result" as he was the only one not to have come to the constituency to campaign in the by-election. The defeated Conservative candidate McEwen blamed his defeat on Labour voters switching to back the Liberals and predicted that the Liberal victory would be overturned at the next general election. In contrast Liberal MP for Caithness and Sutherland George Mackie described the result as "a triumph for David Steel" which showed that the "Liberal surge in Scotland" was continuing and predicted that the next general election would see the party make further gains in Scotland.

Although the Labour candidate lost his deposit, the governing party enjoyed the Conservatives' discomfort, and the result represented a turning point in the government's political fortunes after a very uncertain opening few months. For the Liberals, the acquisition of a talented young MP was still rare enough to be extremely welcome. Steel soon made a national impression and it was his Private Member's Bill which led to the legalisation of abortion in 1967. He would continue to represent the area at Westminster until 1997.
