= Hamilton Grant =

British diplomat and politician

Sir Hamilton Grant, Bt. KCSI KCIE
- Grant in 1922.
- Born: Alfred Hamilton Grant; 12 June 1872; Edinburgh, Scotland
- Died: 23 January 1937 (aged 64); London, England
- Occupation: British Civil Servant in India
- Known for: negotiating 1919 Peace Treaty with Afghanistan

Sir Alfred Hamilton Grant, 12th Baronet KCSI KCIE (12 June 1872 – 23 January 1937), known as Hamilton Grant, and from 1918 as Sir Hamilton Grant, was a British diplomat who served primarily in India. He was also briefly a Liberal Party politician.

== Background ==
Grant was born in Edinburgh, Scotland on 12 June 1872, the son of Sir Alexander Grant, 10th Baronet. He was educated at Fettes College, Edinburgh and Balliol College, Oxford. While at Oxford he won a Rugby football blue. In 1896 he married Mabel Bessie Lovett. The marriage produced two children. In 1910, Mabel died. In 1914, he married Margaret Lucia Cochran of Ashkirk, Selkirkshire. That marriage also produced two children. Following the death of his brother he succeeded to the title of 12th Baronet Grant of Dalvey on 11 February 1936.

== Diplomatic service ==
In 1895 Grant entered the Indian Civil Service. He was Deputy Commissioner of various Frontier districts and Secretary to Frontier Administration. In 1904 he accompanied the Dane Mission to Kabul. In 1908 he was awarded a Companion of the Indian Empire. In 1914 he was appointed Foreign Secretary to the Government of India, serving for 5 years. In 1915 he was awarded a Companion of the Star of India. In 1918 he was awarded a Knight Commander of the Indian Empire. In 1919, after the Third Anglo-Afghan War, he was the Chief Delegate at the Rawalpindi Conference which ended the British protectorate of Afghanistan. He served as the Chief Commissioner of the North-West Frontier Province of British India from 1919 until 1921. In 1922 he was awarded a Knight Commander of the Star of India.

== Political activity ==
In 1922 Grant left India and returned to Britain. He decided to pursue a political career and was chosen as Liberal candidate for Roxburgh and Selkirk where his wife was from. At the time, the Liberals were split between supporters of H. H. Asquith and supporters of Prime Minister David Lloyd George. Grant was a supporter of Asquith and the Roxburgh seat was held by a supporter of Lloyd George. At the general election held that year, the other parties left the seat for the two Liberal candidates and Grant was narrowly defeated;

General Election 1922: Roxburgh & Selkirk Electorate 32,904
Party	Candidate	Votes	%	±%
National Liberal	Sir Thomas Henderson	10,356	51.7	
Liberal	Sir Alfred Hamilton Grant	9,698	48.3	n/a
Majority		658	3.4	
Turnout		20,054	60.9	
National Liberal hold		Swing	n/a	

He did not stand for parliament again.

== Business activity ==
Grant was a Director of Anglo-Huronian, Ltd, Associated Mining and Finance Co., Ltd, Northern Rhodesia Co., Ltd, General Co-operative Investment Trust, Ltd and HE Proprietary Ltd.

Government offices
Preceded by Sir George Roos-Keppel	Chief Commissioner of the North-West Frontier Province; 10 September 1919 – 8 March 1921	Succeeded by Sir John Loader Maffey
Baronetage of Nova Scotia
Preceded by Ludovic James Grant	Baronet (of Dalvey); 1936–1937	Succeeded by Duncan Alexander Grant
