= James Hoy, Baron Hoy =

British politician (1909–1976)

The Right Honourable The Lord Hoy of Leith PC

Member of Parliament for Leith (1945–1950) Edinburgh Leith (1950–1970)
- In office 5 July 1945 – 29 May 1970
- Preceded by: Ernest Brown
- Succeeded by: Ronald King Murray

Member of the House of Lords Lord Temporal
- In office 4 July 1970 – 7 August 1976; Life peerage

Personal details
- Born: James Hutchison Hoy; 21 January 1909 Edinburgh, Scotland
- Died: 7 August 1976 (aged 67) Edinburgh, Scotland
- Party: Labour
- Spouse: Nancy MacArthur (m. 1942)
- Children: 1

James Hutchison Hoy, Baron Hoy PC (21 January 1909 – 7 August 1976) was a Scottish Labour politician and life peer.

== Background ==
Born in Edinburgh, where he was educated at Causewayside and Sciennes Public Schools, he initially worked as an interior decorator. He served with the Eighth Army.

== Political career ==
He was elected as Labour Member of Parliament for Leith at the 1945 general election, holding the seat until 1970. He served as Parliamentary Private Secretary to the Secretary of State for Scotland from 1947 to 1950, and was joint Parliamentary Secretary to the Ministry of Agriculture, Fisheries and Food from 1964 to 1970. He was appointed vice-president of the Trustee Savings Bank Association in 1957.

He became a deputy lieutenant for Edinburgh in 1958, and was appointed a Privy Counsellor in 1969. On 4 July 1970, following his retirement from the House of Commons, he was created a life peer as Baron Hoy, of Leith in the County of the City of Edinburgh.

== Personal life and death ==
Hoy married Nancy MacArthur in 1942, and they had a son. He died in Edinburgh on 7 August 1976.

== See also ==
- Who Was Who

Parliament of the United Kingdom
Preceded by Ernest Brown	Member of Parliament for Leith; 1945 – 1950	Constituency abolished
New constituency	Member of Parliament for Edinburgh Leith; 1950 – 1970	Succeeded by Ronald King Murray
