= Roxburgh and Selkirk =

Parliamentary constituency in the United Kingdom, 1918–1955

- Former county constituency for the House of Commons

1918–1955
- Seats: One
- Created from: Roxburghshire; Peebles and Selkirk; Hawick Burghs
- Replaced by: Roxburgh, Selkirk & Peebles

Roxburgh and Selkirk was a county constituency of the House of Commons of the Parliament of the United Kingdom (Westminster) from 1918 to 1955. It elected one Member of Parliament (MP) by the first past the post voting system.

== Boundaries ==
The constituency was created by the Representation of the People Act 1918, and first used in the 1918 general election, to cover the counties of Roxburgh and Selkirk.

At least nominally, the counties had been covered previously by the Roxburghshire and Peebles and Selkirk constituencies.

For the 1955 general election, as a result of the First Periodical Review of the Boundary Commission, the Roxburgh and Selkirk constituency was abolished and the Roxburgh, Selkirk and Peebles constituency was created, covering the counties of Roxburgh, Selkirk, and Peebles.

== Members of Parliament ==
| Election | Member | Party | Notes |
|---|---|---|---|
| 1918 | Robert Munro | Coalition Liberal | later Baron Alness |
| 1922 | Robert Munro | National Liberal | |
| 1922 | Sir Thomas Henderson | National Liberal | |
| 1923 | Walter Montagu-Douglas-Scott | Unionist | later Duke of Buccleuch & Queensberry |
| 1935 | William Montagu-Douglas-Scott | Unionist | |
| 1950 | Archie Macdonald | Liberal | |
| 1951 | Charles Donaldson | Unionist | subsequently MP for Roxburgh, Selkirk & Peebles |
| 1955 | constituency abolished: see Roxburgh, Selkirk & Peebles | | |

== Election results ==
=== Election in the 1910s ===
Robert Munro

General election 1918: Roxburgh & Selkirk
| Party | | Candidate | Votes | % |
|---|---|---|---|---|
| C | National Liberal | Robert Munro | 13,043 | 70.1 |
| | Labour | Thomas Hamilton | 5,574 | 29.9 |
| Majority | | | 7,469 | 40.2 |
| Turnout | | | 22,407 | 55.4 |
| | National Liberal win (new seat) | | | |
C indicates candidate endorsed by the coalition government.

=== Elections in the 1920s ===
Sir H. Grant

General election 1922: Roxburgh & Selkirk
| Party | Candidate | Votes | % | ±% |
|---|---|---|---|---|
| National Liberal | Thomas Henderson | 10,356 | 51.7 | —18.4 |
| Liberal | Alfred Hamilton Grant | 9,698 | 48.3 | N/A |
| Majority | | 658 | 3.4 | N/A |
| Turnout | | 20,054 | 60.9 | +5.5 |
| National Liberal hold | | Swing | | |

General election 1923: Roxburgh & Selkirk
| Party | Candidate | Votes | % | ±% |
|---|---|---|---|---|
| Unionist | Walter Montagu-Douglas-Scott | 11,258 | 43.1 | New |
| Liberal | Thomas Henderson | 8,046 | 30.8 | −17.5 |
| Labour | George Dallas | 6,811 | 26.1 | New |
| Majority | | 3,212 | 12.3 | N/A |
| Turnout | | 26,115 | 78.2 | +17.3 |
| Unionist gain from Liberal | | Swing | | |

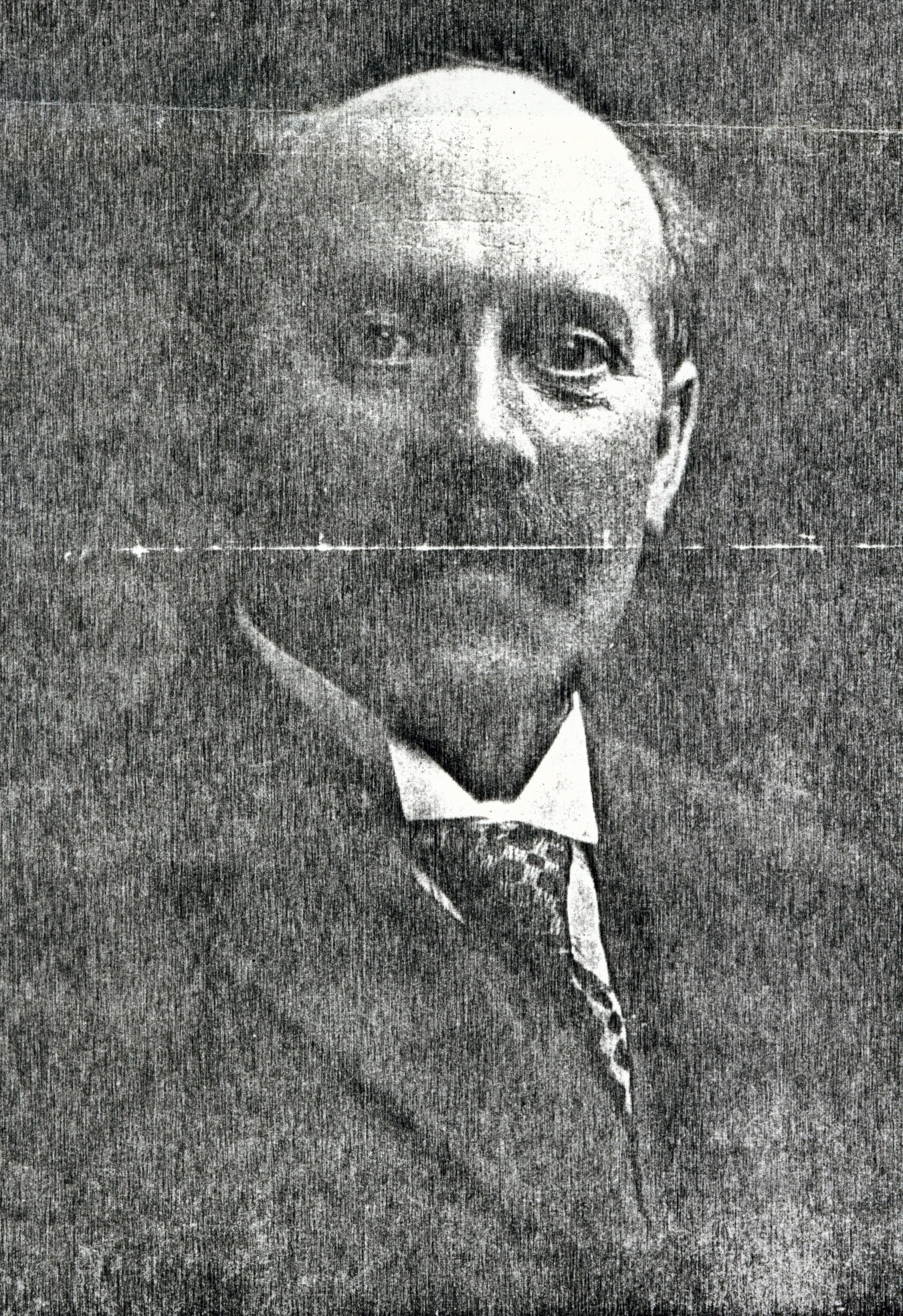
George Dallas

General election 1924: Roxburgh & Selkirk
| Party | Candidate | Votes | % | ±% |
|---|---|---|---|---|
| Unionist | Walter Montagu-Douglas-Scott | 12,684 | 45.8 | +2.7 |
| Liberal | John McIlroy Wylie | 7,737 | 27.9 | −2.9 |
| Labour | George Dallas | 7,266 | 26.2 | +0.1 |
| Majority | | 4,947 | 17.9 | +5.6 |
| Turnout | | 27,687 | | |
| Unionist hold | | Swing | | |

General election 1929: Roxburgh & Selkirk
| Party | Candidate | Votes | % | ±% |
|---|---|---|---|---|
| Unionist | Walter Montagu-Douglas-Scott | 13,510 | 38.0 | −7.8 |
| Liberal | Arthur Robert McDougal | 12,232 | 34.4 | +6.5 |
| Labour | Robert Gibson | 9,803 | 27.6 | +1.4 |
| Majority | | 1,278 | 3.6 | −14.3 |
| Turnout | | 35,545 | 78.5 | |
| Unionist hold | | Swing | -7.2 | |

=== Elections in the 1930s ===
General election 1931: Roxburgh & Selkirk
| Party | Candidate | Votes | % | ±% |
|---|---|---|---|---|
| Unionist | Walter Montagu-Douglas-Scott | 21,394 | 55.1 | +17.1 |
| Liberal | David Edwin Keir | 17,420 | 44.9 | +10.5 |
| Majority | | 3,974 | 10.2 | +6.6 |
| Turnout | | 38,814 | 84.4 | +5.9 |
| Unionist hold | | Swing | | |

General election 1935: Roxburgh & Selkirk
| Party | Candidate | Votes | % | ±% |
|---|---|---|---|---|
| Unionist | William Montagu-Douglas-Scott | 18,342 | 50.0 | −5.1 |
| Liberal | Arthur Robert McDougal | 12,264 | 33.4 | −11.5 |
| Labour | James Alexander Cuthburt Thomson | 6,099 | 16.6 | New |
| Majority | | 6,078 | 16.6 | +6.4 |
| Turnout | | 36,705 | 78.0 | −6.4 |
| Unionist hold | | Swing | +3.2 | |

=== Elections in the 1940s ===
A General election was due to take place before the end of 1940, but was postponed due to the Second World War. By 1939, the following candidates had been selected to contest this constituency;

- Unionist Party: William Montagu-Douglas-Scott
- Liberal Party: James Scott

General election 1945: Roxburgh & Selkirk
| Party | Candidate | Votes | % | ±% |
|---|---|---|---|---|
| Unionist | William Montagu-Douglas-Scott | 13,232 | 37.9 | −12.1 |
| Liberal | Archie Macdonald | 11,604 | 33.2 | −0.2 |
| Labour | LP Thomas | 10,107 | 28.9 | +12.3 |
| Majority | | 1,628 | 4.7 | −11.9 |
| Turnout | | 34,943 | 73.7 | −4.3 |
| Unionist hold | | Swing | -6.0 | |

=== Elections in the 1950s ===
General election 1950: Roxburgh & Selkirk
| Party | Candidate | Votes | % | ±% |
|---|---|---|---|---|
| Liberal | Archie Macdonald | 15,347 | 39.4 | +6.2 |
| Unionist | William Montagu-Douglas-Scott | 14,191 | 36.4 | −1.5 |
| Labour | LP Thomas | 9,413 | 24.2 | −4.7 |
| Majority | | 1,156 | 3.0 | −N/A |
| Turnout | | 38,951 | 82.1 | +8.4 |
| Liberal gain from Unionist | | Swing | +3.9 | |

General election 1951: Roxburgh & Selkirk
| Party | Candidate | Votes | % | ±% |
|---|---|---|---|---|
| Unionist | Charles Donaldson | 16,438 | 40.6 | +4.2 |
| Liberal | Archie Macdonald | 15,609 | 38.6 | −0.8 |
| Labour | Thomas White | 8,395 | 20.8 | −3.4 |
| Majority | | 829 | 2.0 | N/A |
| Turnout | | 40,442 | 84.9 | +2.8 |
| Unionist gain from Liberal | | Swing | +2.5 | |

== Sources ==
- Craig, F. W. S. (1983) [1969]. British parliamentary election results 1918–1949 (3rd ed.). Chichester: Parliamentary Research Services. ISBN 0-900178-06-X.
- Leigh Rayment's Historical List of MPs – Constituencies beginning with "R" (part 2)
