= Battle of Britain Memorial =

Battle of Britain Memorial may refer to these memorials dedicated to the WWII Battle of Britain between German and British air forces:

- Battle of Britain Memorial, Capel-le-Ferne, Kent
- Battle of Britain Memorial, London
- Battle of Britain Memorial Flight, an RAF display team

== See also ==
- Battle of Britain (disambiguation)
