= Ronald King Murray, Lord Murray =

British politician

Ronald King Murray, Lord Murray, PC (15 June 1922 – 27 September 2016) was a Scottish Labour politician and judge who rose to be a Senator of the College of Justice in 1979.

== Life ==
Educated at George Watson's College, Edinburgh, the University of Edinburgh and Jesus College, Oxford, he served in the REME and SEAC from 1941 to 1946. He was admitted as an advocate in 1953, served as an Advocate Depute from 1964 to 1970 (from 1967 as a Senior Advocate Depute). He was appointed a Queen's Counsel in 1967.

He was an unsuccessful candidate for Caithness and Sutherland in 1959, Edinburgh North in a May 1960 by-election, and Roxburgh, Selkirk and Peebles in 1964 and 1965. He was elected and sat for Edinburgh Leith from 1970 until 1979.

He served as Lord Advocate from March 1974 until May 1979, and was appointed a Privy Counsellor in 1974. In 1979 he was appointed to the Court of Session and High Court of Justiciary as a Senator of the College of Justice, with the judicial title Lord Murray. His uncle David King Murray had been a Senator of the College of Justice from 1945 to 1955.

In April 1977, the Young Liberals' annual conference unanimously passed a motion to call on the Liberal leader (David Steel) to move for the impeachment of Murray for allegedly mishandling a murder case. Despite the urgings of the then chairman of the Young Liberals, Peter Hain, Steel did not table such a motion in the House of Commons, but Murray agreed that the Commons still have the right to initiate an impeachment motion.

Lord Murray was an active supporter of the World Court Project U.K., part of a worldwide network directed to obtaining a decision on the legality of using nuclear weapons. Success came in 1996, when the International Court of Justice ruled, in an advisory opinion, that the use of such weapons and the threat to use them would generally be illegal as contrary to international humanitarian law.

He died on 27 September 2016 at the age of 94.

== Family ==
He was nephew of David King Murray, Lord Birnam

Parliament of the United Kingdom
Preceded by James Hoy	Member of Parliament for Edinburgh Leith; 1970–1979	Succeeded by Ron Brown
Legal offices
Preceded by Norman Wylie	Lord Advocate; 1974–1979	Succeeded by James Mackay
