= David Steel (minister) =

Church of Scotland minister (1910-2002)

David Steel (5 October 1910 – 11 November 2002) was a Church of Scotland minister.

== Biography ==
From 1949 to 1957 he was minister of St Andrew's Church, Nairobi, Kenya. For much of that time, the then British Colony of Kenya was in civil unrest due to the Mau Mau Uprising. Steel deplored the violence of the Mau Mau, but came to believe that the colonial government's response – which included detentions without trial and many executions – was disproportionate and immoral.

In January 1955 he spoke out against government policy in a sermon at St Andrew's Church. The local English-language newspaper criticised Steel's intervention in politics, in an editorial titled "Who will rid us of this turbulent priest?", thus implicitly drawing a parallel between Steel and Thomas Becket.

Steel also helped to secure the early release of a number of detainees.

Steel returned to Scotland in 1957, and spent the rest of his ministry there, serving as minister at St. Michael's Parish Church, Linlithgow. He was elected Moderator of the General Assembly of the Church of Scotland in 1974–75. He retired in 1976, and died in Edinburgh in 2002, aged 92.

== Personal life ==
One of his sons, also David Steel, now Lord Steel of Aikwood, is a British formerly Liberal Democrat politician and former party leader.
