= Thomas Henderson (Liberal politician) =

Scottish Liberal Party politician and businessman (1874–1951)

Sir Thomas Henderson (15 July 1874 – 3 May 1951) was a Scottish Liberal Party politician and businessman.

== Background ==
He was the son of James Henderson JP of Hawick. He was educated at Hawick and at Blairlodge Academy, Stirlingshire. He married, in 1900, Helen Scott Thyne. They had two sons and one daughter.

== Professional career ==
He was Director of the firm of Messrs. Innes, Henderson and Co, Ltd., hosiery manufacturers of Hawick. He was President of the South of Scotland Chamber of Commerce.

== Political career ==
He was a Justice of the peace for Roxburghshire, a member of the Licensing Appeal Court, and of the National Council of the Y.M.C.A., and for several years he was a member of Hawick Town Council. He was National Liberal Party (UK) Member of Parliament for Roxburgh and Selkirk from 1922 to 1923. He was first elected in 1922 as a supporter of deposed Coalition Prime Minister David Lloyd George against another Liberal who was a supporter of H. H. Asquith;

General election 1922: Roxburgh & Selkirk Electorate 32,904
Party	Candidate	Votes	%	±%
National Liberal	Sir Thomas Henderson	10,356	51.7	
Liberal	Sir Alfred Hamilton Grant	9,698	48.3	n/a
Majority		658	3.4	
Turnout		20,054	60.9	
National Liberal hold		Swing	n/a	

In 1923 following reunion between Lloyd George and Asquith, he sought to retain his seat as the Liberal candidate. However, he was now opposed by a Unionist and was defeated;

General election 1923: Roxburgh & Selkirk Electorate 33,405
Party	Candidate	Votes	%	±%
Unionist	Earl of Dalkeith	11,258	43.1	n/a
Liberal	Sir Thomas Henderson	8,046	30.8	n/a
Labour	George Dallas	6,811	26.1	n/a
Majority		3,212	12.3	n/a
Turnout		26,115	78.2	+17.3
Unionist gain from Liberal		Swing	n/a	

He was Honorary Sheriff-Substitute for Roxburghshire.

Parliament of the United Kingdom
Preceded by Robert Munro	Member of Parliament for Roxburgh and Selkirk; 1922–1923	Succeeded by Walter Montagu-Douglas-Scott, Earl of Dalkeith
