= Edinburgh Leith =

UK constituency, 1950–1997

- Former burgh constituency for the House of Commons
- Subdivisions of Scotland: City of Edinburgh

1950–1997
- Seats: One
- Created from: Leith
- Replaced by: Edinburgh North and Leith

Edinburgh Leith was a burgh constituency of the House of Commons of the Parliament of the United Kingdom from 1950 to 1997. It elected one Member of Parliament (MP) by the first past the post system of election.

There was also an earlier Leith constituency, 1918 to 1950, and a yet earlier Leith Burghs constituency, 1832 to 1918.

== Boundaries ==
=== 1950 to 1955 ===
The constituency was first defined by the House of Commons (Redistribution of Seats) Act 1949, and first used in the 1950 general election, as one of seven constituencies covering the city of Edinburgh and the Midlothian burgh of Musselburgh. The other six constituencies were Edinburgh Central, Edinburgh East, Edinburgh North, Edinburgh Pentlands, Edinburgh South, and Edinburgh West, and the rest of the county of Midlothian was covered by the Midlothian and Peebles constituency, which also covered the county of Peebles.

The Edinburgh Leith constituency was entirely within the city, and covered the Central Leith, South Leith, and West Leith wards. Therefore, the area of the constituency was similar to that of the former burgh of Leith, as merged into the city in 1920.

1950 boundaries were used also for the 1951 general election.

=== 1955 to 1983 ===
The results of the First Periodical Review of the Boundary Commission were implemented for the 1955 general election, and Edinburgh Leith was again one of seven constituencies covering the city of Edinburgh and the burgh of Musselburgh, all named as during the 1950 to 1955 period. The rest of the county of Midlothian was now covered, however, by the new Midlothian constituency.

The Edinburgh Leith constituency again covered wards named Central Leith, South Leith, and West Leith, but the overall boundary of the constituency was different.

For the county of Midlothian, inclusive of the city of Edinburgh, the general pattern established by the First Periodical Review was maintained for the general elections of 1959, 1964, 1966, 1970, February 1974, October 1974 and 1979. There were boundary adjustments, however, which became effective for the 1964 election and, as a result of the Second Periodical Review, for the February 1974 election.

Edinburgh Leith was not affected by the 1964 changes. For the February 1974 election, the constituency was designed to cover the Central Leith, South Leith, and West Leith wards and part of the Pilton ward of city.

=== 1983 to 1997 ===
The results of the Third Periodical Review, which took account of the abolition of Scottish counties and burghs in 1975 and the creation of two-tier regions and districts and unitary islands council areas under the Local Government (Scotland) Act 1973, were implemented for the 1983 general election, and 1983 boundaries were used also in the general elections of 1987 and 1992.

Between 1983 and 1997 the electoral wards used to create Edinburgh Leith were 12–14, 17, and 18, and part of 23

As a result of the Fourth Periodical Review, Edinburgh Leith was abolished, and Edinburgh North and Leith was created for the 1997 general election.

== Members of Parliament ==
Election	Member	Party
1950	James Hoy	Labour
1970	Ronald King Murray	Labour
1979	Ron Brown	Labour
1991	Ron Brown	Independent
1992	Malcolm Chisholm	Labour
1997	constituency abolished	

== Elections ==
=== Elections in the 1950s ===
General election 1950: Edinburgh Leith
Party	Candidate	Votes	%	±%
Labour	James Hoy	18,111	49.22	
National Liberal	Eoin Cameron Mekie	15,841	43.05	
Liberal	Thomas McGill Frew	2,846	7.73	
Majority		2,270	6.17	
Turnout		36,798	80.71	
Labour win (new seat)				

General election 1951: Edinburgh Leith
Party	Candidate	Votes	%	±%
Labour	James Hoy	19,308	50.09	+0.87
National Liberal	Eoin Cameron Mekie	19,236	49.91	+6.86
Majority		72	0.18	−5.99
Turnout		38,544	84.05	+3.34
Labour hold		Swing	-3.00	

General election 1955: Edinburgh Leith
Party	Candidate	Votes	%	±%
Labour	James Hoy	16,337	49.38	−0.71
National Liberal	Janet Sutherland Shearer	10,693	32.32	−17.59
Independent Liberal	Andrew Murray	6,055	18.30	New
Majority		5,644	17.06	+16.87
Turnout		33,085	77.79	−6.26
Labour hold		Swing	+8.44	

General election 1959: Edinburgh Leith
Party	Candidate	Votes	%	±%
Labour	James Hoy	15,092	47.78	−1.60
National Liberal	Gershom Stewart	12,018	38.05	+5.73
Liberal	Andrew Murray	4,475	14.17	−4.13
Majority		3,074	9.73	−7.33
Turnout		31,585	79.46	+1.67
Labour hold		Swing	-3.67	

=== Elections in the 1960s ===
General election 1964: Edinburgh Leith
Party	Candidate	Votes	%	±%
Labour	James Hoy	15,934	55.50	+7.72
National Liberal	Gershom Stewart	12,777	44.50	+6.45
Majority		3,157	11.00	+1.27
Turnout		28,711	77.86	−1.60
Labour hold		Swing	+0.64	

General election 1966: Edinburgh Leith
Party	Candidate	Votes	%	±%
Labour	James Hoy	15,407	56.79	+1.29
Conservative	Archie Elliott	11,443	42.18	−2.32
Communist	Honor Arundel	279	1.03	New
Majority		3,964	14.61	+3.61
Turnout		27,129	76.09	−1.77
Labour hold		Swing	+1.81	

=== Elections in the 1970s ===
General election 1970: Edinburgh Leith
Party	Candidate	Votes	%	±%
Labour	Ronald Murray	12,066	46.29	−10.50
Conservative	Archie Elliott	10,682	40.98	−1.20
SNP	Mary G Thomson	1,827	7.01	New
Liberal	Joyce Shein	1,490	5.72	New
Majority		1,384	5.31	−9.30
Turnout		26,065	73.11	−2.98
Labour hold		Swing	-4.15	

General election February 1974: Edinburgh Leith
Party	Candidate	Votes	%	±%
Labour	Ronald Murray	12,604	40.58	−5.71
Conservative	William Robert Victor Percy	11,883	38.26	−2.72
SNP	Hugh Miller	6,569	21.15	+14.14
Majority		721	2.32	−2.99
Turnout		31,056	79.31	+6.20
Labour hold		Swing	-1.50	

General election October 1974: Edinburgh Leith
Party	Candidate	Votes	%	±%
Labour	Ronald Murray	11,708	39.69	−0.89
Conservative	William Robert Victor Percy	8,263	28.01	−10.25
SNP	Robert John Dinwoodie Scott	7,688	26.07	+4.91
Liberal	Arthur John Heley Squair	1,836	6.22	New
Majority		3,445	11.68	+9.36
Turnout		29,495	74.85	−4.46
Labour hold		Swing	+4.68	

General election 1979: Edinburgh Leith
Party	Candidate	Votes	%	±%
Labour	Ron Brown	12,961	46.30	+6.61
Conservative	Aidan Joseph McLernan	8,944	31.95	+3.94
Liberal	Keith Graeme Aitken	3,382	12.08	+5.86
SNP	William Richard Platt	2,706	9.67	−16.40
Majority		4,017	14.35	+2.67
Turnout		27,993	75.24	+0.39
Labour hold		Swing	+1.34	

=== Elections in the 1980s ===
General election 1983: Edinburgh Leith
Party	Candidate	Votes	%	±%
Labour	Ron Brown	16,177	39.71	−7.33
SDP	David Graham	11,204	27.51	+14.30
Conservative	Brian Cooklin	10,706	26.28	−2.70
SNP	John Young	2,646	6.50	−4.26
Majority		4,973	12.20	−2.1
Turnout		40,733	67.26	−9.9
Labour hold		Swing		

General election 1987: Edinburgh Leith
Party	Candidate	Votes	%	±%
Labour	Ron Brown	21,104	49.3	+9.6
Conservative	Duncan Menzies	9,777	22.9	−3.4
SDP	Shelia Wells	7,843	18.3	−9.2
SNP	William Morrison	4,045	9.5	+3.0
Majority		11,327	26.4	+14.2
Turnout		42,769	70.9	+3.6
Labour hold		Swing		

=== Elections in the 1990s ===
General election 1992: Edinburgh Leith
Party	Candidate	Votes	%	±%
Labour	Malcolm Chisholm	13,790	34.2	−15.1
SNP	Fiona Hyslop	8,805	21.8	+12.3
Conservative	Mohammed Rizvi	8,496	21.1	−1.8
Liberal Democrats	Hilary C. Campbell	4,975	12.3	−6.0
Independent Labour	Ron Brown	4,142	10.3	−39.0
Natural Law	Alan J. Swan	96	0.2	New
Majority		4,985	12.4	−14.0
Turnout		40,304	71.1	+0.2
Labour hold		Swing	-13.8	

== See also ==
- Politics of Edinburgh
