= Leith (UK Parliament constituency) =

Parliamentary constituency in the United Kingdom, 1918–1950

- Former burgh constituency for the House of Commons
- Subdivisions of Scotland: City of Edinburgh (from 1920)
- Major settlements: Leith

1918–1950
- Seats: One
- Created from: Leith Burghs
- Replaced by: Edinburgh Leith

Leith was a burgh constituency of the House of Commons of the Parliament of the United Kingdom from 1918 to 1950. The constituency elected one Member of Parliament (MP) by the first past the post system of election.

There was also an earlier Leith Burghs constituency, 1832 to 1918, and a later Edinburgh Leith constituency, 1950 to 1997.

== Boundaries ==
The Leith constituency was created under the Representation of the People Act 1918, and first used in the 1918 general election, to cover the burgh of Leith, in the county of Midlothian. The burgh was previously within the Leith Burghs constituency.

1918 boundaries were used also in the general elections of 1922, 1923, 1924, 1929, 1931, 1935 and 1945.

The burgh was merged into the City of Edinburgh in 1920, and for the 1950 general election, under the House of Commons (Redistribution of Seats) Act 1949, the Edinburgh Leith constituency was created as one of seven constituencies covering the city and the Midlothian burgh of Musselburgh.

== Members of Parliament ==
Election	Member	Party
1918	William Wedgwood Benn	Liberal
1927 by-election	Ernest Brown	Liberal
1931	Ernest Brown	National Liberal
1945	James Hutchison Hoy, subsequently MP for Edinburgh Leith	Labour

== Election results ==
=== Elections in the 1910s ===
George Currie

General election 1918: Leith Electorate
Party		Candidate	Votes	%	±%
	Liberal	William Wedgwood Benn	10,338	46.6	
C	Unionist	George Welsh Currie	7,613	34.3	
	Labour	Stanley Burgess	4,251	19.1	
Majority			2,725	12.3	
Turnout			22,202	52.2	
Registered electors			42,507		
	Liberal win (new seat)				
C indicates candidate endorsed by the coalition government.

=== Elections in the 1920s ===
Wedgwood Benn

General election 1922: Leith
Party	Candidate	Votes	%	±%
Liberal	William Wedgwood Benn	13,971	50.1	+3.5
Unionist	Alexander Munro MacRobert	7,372	26.4	−7.9
Labour	Robert Freeman Wilson	6,567	23.5	+4.4
Majority		6,599	23.7	+11.4
Turnout		27,910	71.5	+19.3
Registered electors		39,048		
Liberal hold		Swing	+5.7	

General election 1923: Leith
Party	Candidate	Votes	%	±%
Liberal	William Wedgwood Benn	15,004	64.5	+14.4
Labour	Robert Freeman Wilson	8,267	35.5	+12.0
Majority		6,737	29.0	+5.3
Turnout		23,271	59.1	−12.4
Registered electors		39,385		
Liberal hold		Swing	+1.2	

General election 1924: Leith
Party	Candidate	Votes	%	±%
Liberal	William Wedgwood Benn	16,569	59.6	−4.9
Labour	Robert Freeman Wilson	11,250	40.4	+4.9
Majority		5,319	19.2	−9.8
Turnout		27,819	70.5	+11.4
Liberal hold		Swing	−4.9	

1927 Leith by-election
Party	Candidate	Votes	%	±%
Liberal	Ernest Brown	12,461	42.3	−17.3
Labour	Robert Freeman Wilson	12,350	42.0	+1.6
Unionist	Allan Beaton	4,607	15.7	New
Majority		111	0.3	−18.9
Turnout		29,418	73.9	+3.4
Registered electors		39,795		
Liberal hold		Swing	−9.5	

General election, 30 May 1929: Leith
Party	Candidate	Votes	%	±%
Liberal	Ernest Brown	20,613	56.7	−2.9
Labour	Alan H Paton	15,715	43.3	+2.9
Majority		4,898	13.4	−5.8
Turnout		36,328	71.5	+1.0
Registered electors		50,801		
Liberal hold		Swing	−2.9	

- change and swing from 1924

=== Elections in the 1930s ===
General election 1931: Leith Electorate 50,979
Party	Candidate	Votes	%	±%
National Liberal	Ernest Brown	24,847	65.0	+8.3
Labour	Arthur Woodburn	13,400	35.0	−8.3
Majority		11,447	30.0	N/A
Turnout		38,247	75.0	+3.5
National Liberal gain from Liberal		Swing		

General election 1935: Leith
Party	Candidate	Votes	%	±%
National Liberal	Ernest Brown	18,888	57.7	−7.3
Labour	David Cleghorn Thomson	13,818	42.2	+7.2
Majority		5,070	15.5	−14.5
Turnout		32,706	65.5	−9.5
National Liberal hold		Swing	-7.3	

General Election 1939–40: Another General Election was required to take place before the end of 1940. The political parties had been making preparations for an election to take place from 1939 and by the end of this year, the following candidates had been selected;

- Liberal National: Ernest Brown
- Labour: James Hoy

=== Elections in the 1940s ===
General election 1945: Leith
Party	Candidate	Votes	%	±%
Labour	James Hoy	19,571	60.8	+18.6
National Liberal	Ernest Brown	10,116	31.4	−26.3
Protestant Action	John Cormack	2,493	7.8	New
Majority		9,455	29.4	N/A
Turnout		32,180	69.3	+3.8
Labour gain from National Liberal		Swing	+22.4	

== See also ==
- Politics of Edinburgh
