= Charles Edward McArthur Donaldson =

Scottish Unionist Party politician

Charles Edward McArthur Donaldson (15 March 1903 – 11 December 1964) was a Scottish Unionist Party politician.

He was elected at the 1951 general election as Member of Parliament for Roxburgh and Selkirk. When that constituency was abolished for the 1955 general election, he was returned to the House of Commons for the new Roxburgh, Selkirk and Peebles constituency.

He held the seat until his death in 1964. The resulting by-election in 1965 was won by the Liberal Party candidate David Steel, who went on to become his party's leader.

Parliament of the United Kingdom
Preceded by Archie Macdonald	Member of Parliament for Roxburgh and Selkirk; 1951–1955	Constituency abolished
New constituency	Member of Parliament for Roxburgh, Selkirk and Peebles; 1955–1964	Succeeded by David Steel
