= Ernest Brown (British politician) =

British politician (1881–1962)

The Right Honourable Ernest Brown CH MC
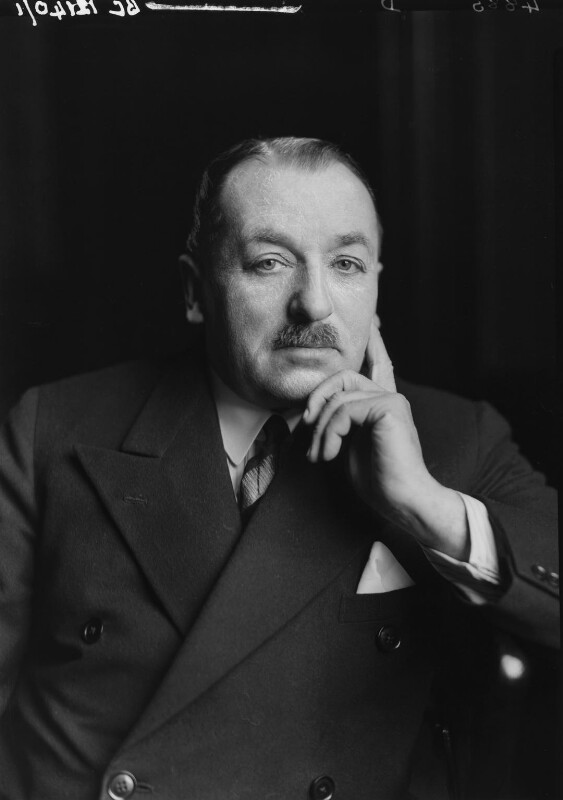

Minister of Aircraft Production
- In office 25 May 1945 – 5 July 1945
- Prime Minister: Winston Churchill
- Preceded by: Stafford Cripps
- Succeeded by: Office abolished

Chancellor of the Duchy of Lancaster
- In office 11 November 1943 – 25 May 1945
- Prime Minister: Winston Churchill
- Preceded by: Duff Cooper
- Succeeded by: James Arthur Salter

Minister of Health
- In office 8 February 1941 – 11 November 1943
- Prime Minister: Winston Churchill
- Preceded by: Malcolm MacDonald
- Succeeded by: Henry Willink

Chairman of the National Liberal Party
- In office 1940–1945
- Preceded by: John Simon
- Succeeded by: James Henderson-Stewart

Secretary of State for Scotland
- In office 14 May 1940 – 8 February 1941
- Prime Minister: Winston Churchill
- Preceded by: John Colville
- Succeeded by: Tom Johnston

Minister of Labour
- In office 7 June 1935 – 14 May 1940
- Prime Minister: Stanley Baldwin; Neville Chamberlain
- Preceded by: Oliver Stanley
- Succeeded by: Ernest Bevin

Secretary for Mines
- In office 30 September 1932 – 18 June 1935
- Prime Minister: Ramsay MacDonald
- Preceded by: Isaac Foot
- Succeeded by: Harry Crookshank

Member of Parliament for Leith
- In office 23 March 1927 – 5 July 1945
- Preceded by: William Wedgwood Benn
- Succeeded by: James Hoy

Member of Parliament for Rugby
- In office 6 December 1923 – 29 October 1924
- Preceded by: Euan Wallace
- Succeeded by: David Margesson

Personal details
- Born: 27 August 1881 Torquay, Devon, United Kingdom
- Died: 16 February 1962 (aged 80)
- Party: National Liberal; Liberal

Alfred Ernest Brown CH MC PC (27 August 1881 – 16 February 1962) was a British politician who served as leader of the Liberal Nationals from 1940 until 1945. He was a member of Parliament and also held many other political offices throughout the Second World War.

== Biography ==
Born in Torquay, Devon, Brown was the son of a fisherman and prominent Baptist and it was through following his father that he came to preach, gaining much experience as a public speaker. He soon came to the attention of the local Liberals and became a prominent public speaker at political meetings.

Brown served in the First World War: in 1914 he joined the Sportsman's Battalion and in 1916 was commissioned as an officer in the Somerset Light Infantry. He was mentioned in dispatches and was awarded the Military Cross and Italian Silver Star.

After three unsuccessful attempts in other constituencies, he was elected as a Liberal Member of Parliament (MP) for Rugby in the 1923 general election but lost his seat in the 1924 general election. In 1927 he returned to Parliament in a by-election at Leith. During this time he became a devoted follower of Sir John Simon as the latter became increasingly at odds with the leader of the Liberals, David Lloyd George, and the party's support, from 1929, for the minority Labour government of Ramsay MacDonald. In 1931 he followed Simon in resigning the Liberal party whip and then subsequently in setting up the Liberal Nationals.

=== In cabinet ===
In the National Government of Ramsay MacDonald, Brown became Parliamentary Secretary to the Ministry of Health in November 1931. The following year the official Liberal Cabinet ministers resigned from the government and Brown was promoted to become Secretary for Mines. In 1935 when MacDonald was succeeded as prime minister by Stanley Baldwin, Brown entered the Cabinet as Minister of Labour. This proved controversial as many believed that the Minister of Transport Leslie Hore-Belisha, had a stronger claim to be the next Liberal National to enter the Cabinet, though as unemployment was one of the government's biggest problems, many others felt that Brown's appointment to the job was not one to envy. He held the post for the next five years under both Baldwin and his successor, Neville Chamberlain. One of his most prominent achievements was the Unemployment Insurance (Agriculture) Act, 1936 which extended social security to nearly all workers in agriculture, forestry and horticulture. In another sphere he oversaw the formation of the National Joint Advisory Committee which assisted in wage control, compulsory arbitration, and direction of labour. He also helped workers in distributing to organise and took great pride when in 1937 the Trades Union Congress passed a unanimous resolution thanking him for this. In 1939 his department was expanded to incorporate overseeing National Service.

=== Party leadership ===
When Chamberlain fell in 1940 he was succeeded by Winston Churchill who moved Brown to the position of Secretary of State for Scotland, an unusual move as Brown, despite sitting for a Scottish constituency, was English by birth. At the same time Brown became the leader of the Liberal Nationals after Sir John Simon was transferred to the House of Lords. Brown served as Secretary of State for Scotland for a year before becoming Minister of Health for two years and finally Chancellor of the Duchy of Lancaster.

Brown's tenure as leader of the Liberal Nationals was one of decline, as the party saw its influence diminish. Many in the party had regretted the division of Liberal forces a decade earlier and Brown undertook negotiations with the Liberal Party leader Sir Archibald Sinclair over a potential reunion, but these talks foundered on the question of continued support for the National Government after the war. The change in the leadership of the Conservatives was also unfavourable and when, in 1945, Churchill formed his "Caretaker" government he did not include Brown or any other senior Liberal Nationals except Lord Rosebery in the Cabinet, despite claiming to head a "National" administration. Brown was instead appointed Minister of Aircraft Production. In the 1945 general election Brown lost his seat.

=== Retirement and legacy ===
After the war Brown devoted his attention to the church, often visiting other parts of the Commonwealth.

Brown had a reputation for being a fast speaker and many contemporary political commentators estimated that he could deliver a statement to the House of Commons faster than any other minister. The size of his voice was also noted. Baldwin once saw Brown in a phonebox at the House of Commons and is said to have remarked, "I didn't think he needed a phone to communicate with his constituents." Another more famous story reflecting on Brown's strong voice, is told of when Stanley Baldwin was living at 11 Downing Street he was startled by a great shouting in the building. When informed that it was Ernest Brown talking to Scotland, Baldwin said "Why doesn't he use the telephone?"

== Bibliography ==
- Torrance, David, The Scottish Secretaries (Birlinn 2006)

Parliament of the United Kingdom
Preceded by Euan Wallace	Member of Parliament for Rugby; 1923–1924	Succeeded by David Margesson
Preceded by William Wedgwood Benn	Member of Parliament for Leith; 1927–1945	Succeeded by James Hoy
Political offices
Preceded by Oliver Stanley	Minister of Labour; 1935–1940	Succeeded by Ernest Bevin as Minister of Labour and National Service
Preceded by John Colville	Secretary of State for Scotland; 1940–1941	Succeeded by Thomas Johnston
Preceded by Malcolm MacDonald	Minister of Health; 1941–1943	Succeeded by Henry Willink
Preceded by Duff Cooper	Chancellor of the Duchy of Lancaster; 1943–1945	Succeeded by James Salter
Preceded by Stafford Cripps	Minister of Aircraft Production; 1945	Office abolished
Party political offices
Preceded by John Simon	Leader of the Liberal National Party; 1940–1945	Succeeded by James Henderson-Stewart
