= 1927 Leith by-election =

UK parliamentary by-election

- 23 March 1927

Constituency of Leith
- Registered: 39,480
- Turnout: 73.9%
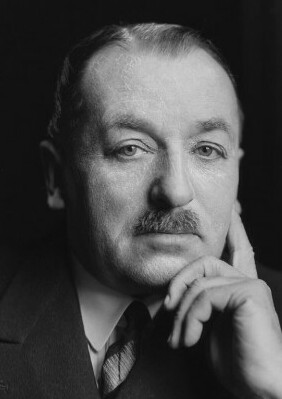
| | First party | Second party | Third party |
|---|---|---|---|
| Candidate | Alfred Ernest Brown | Robert Freeman Wilson | Allan Beaton |
| Party | Liberal | Labour | Conservative |
| Popular vote | 12,461 | 12,350 | 4,607 |
| Percentage | 42.3% | 42.0% | 15.7% |
| Swing | −17.3% | +1.6% | New |
MP before election
William Wedgwood Benn
Liberal
Elected MP
Alfred Ernest Brown
Liberal

There was a 1927 by-election for the UK House of Commons constituency of Leith, which took place on Wednesday, 23 March 1927.

== Previous MP ==
When David Lloyd George replaced H. H. Asquith as Leader of the Liberal Party, the Liberal MP, William Wedgwood Benn decided to cross the floor from the Liberal Party and switch to the Labour Party. Benn believed that his change of party allegiances warranted him resigning his seat and seeking re-election.

== Previous result ==
General election, 29 October 1924 Electorate: 39,480
| Party | Candidate | Votes | % | ±% |
|---|---|---|---|---|
| Liberal | William Wedgwood Benn | 16,569 | 59.6 | −4.9 |
| Labour | Robert Freeman Wilson | 11,250 | 40.4 | +4.9 |
| Majority | | 5,319 | 19.2 | −9.8 |
| Turnout | | 27,819 | 70.5 | +11.4 |
| Liberal hold | | Swing | -4.9 | |

== Candidates ==
Benn had been the Liberal MP for Leith since the khaki election of 1918 and was keen to stand for election as a Labour candidate. However, the Leith Constituency Labour Party did not want him as their candidate, so Benn did not contest the by-election. The Leith CLP selected R.F. Wilson as their candidate. He was a local socialist who had stood against Benn at the two previous general elections. The Conservatives, who had not contested the seat since 1918, selected Allan Beaton. He was one of the Scottish Conservatives most experienced candidates. He had contested the safe Labour seat of Edinburgh Central at the previous general election in 1924. The Leith Liberal Association struggled to find a Liberal candidate prepared to defend a seat under such difficult circumstances. However, their seventh choice as candidate, Ernest Brown agreed to contest the seat. Brown was an Englishman who was employed by party headquarters as a speaker. He had briefly served as the Liberal MP for Rugby from 1923-24 when he was defeated at the general election one year later.

== Campaign ==
The Liberal campaign was reliant upon Brown's ability and enthusiasm as a speaker, backed by plentiful funds from Lloyd George's national organisation. However, his task was made difficult because the local Liberal organisation had been allowed to run down during Benn's tenure as MP.

== Result ==
Right up to polling day, the newspapers were predicting either a Labour win or a Conservative win with much talk about the prospect of the Liberal losing his deposit.

Leith by-election, 23 March 1927 Electorate:
| Party | Candidate | Votes | % | ±% |
|---|---|---|---|---|
| Liberal | Alfred Ernest Brown | 12,461 | 42.3 | −17.3 |
| Labour | Robert Freeman Wilson | 12,350 | 42.0 | +1.6 |
| Conservative | Allan Beaton | 4,607 | 15.7 | New |
| Majority | | 111 | 0.3 | −18.9 |
| Turnout | | 29,418 | 73.9 | +3.4 |
| Liberal hold | | Swing | -9.5 | |

== Aftermath ==
Four days after this victory, the Liberals gained a seat from Labour at Southwark North. Benn did not have long to wait for a local Labour Party to adopt him as a candidate when a by-election vacancy came at Aberdeen North in 1928, where he was returned to parliament. At the 1929 general election, Brown was re-elected here. Beaton contested Dunfermline Burghs without success and Wilson did not stand again.

General election, 30 May 1929 Electorate 50,801
| Party | Candidate | Votes | % | ±% |
|---|---|---|---|---|
| Liberal | Alfred Ernest Brown | 20,613 | 56.7 | −2.9 |
| Labour | Alan H Paton | 15,715 | 43.3 | +2.9 |
| Majority | | 4,898 | 14.4 | −5.8 |
| Turnout | | 36,328 | 71.5 | +1.0 |
| Liberal hold | | Swing | -2.9 | |
