= Ron Brown (Scottish politician) =

Scottish politician (1938–2007)

Member of Parliament for Edinburgh Leith
- In office 3 May 1979 – 16 March 1992
- Preceded by: Ronald King Murray
- Succeeded by: Malcolm Chisholm

Personal details
- Born: 29 June 1938 West Pilton, Edinburgh, Scotland
- Died: 3 August 2007 (aged 69) Edinburgh, Scotland
- Party: Labour (until 1991); Independent (1991–1992); SSP (from 1998)
- Occupation: Politician
- Nickname: Red Ron

Ronald Duncan McLaren Brown (29 June 1938 – 3 August 2007) was a Scottish Labour Party politician. He sat in the British House of Commons as the Member of Parliament (MP) for the Edinburgh Leith constituency, from the 1979 general election to the 1992 general election. Brown was suspended from the House of Commons on several occasions. In a 1988 incident he damaged the Mace.

== Early life ==
Brown was born into a working-class family at West Pilton in Edinburgh to James Brown and Margaret McLaren. He was educated at Pennywell Primary School, Ainslie Park High School and the Bristo Technical Institute in the city.

He undertook National Service in the Royal Signals followed by five years as an apprentice fitter.

He worked as an electrician with the electricity board and later Bruce Peebles & Co. Ltd. He became an active member of the Amalgamated Union of Engineering Workers (AUEW). While at Bruce Peebles he served as a trade union shop steward convener. While working as an electrician Brown was injured in a transformer fire, receiving burns to his face and hands. This left him with scars for the rest of his life despite plastic surgery.

== Political career ==
=== Councillor ===
In the 1970s he was elected a member of Edinburgh Town Council and then a member of Lothian Regional Council between 1974 and 1979. He would get into difficulties with party superiors for statements in the press and defying party whips.

=== Member of Parliament ===
Brown was selected to stand for Edinburgh Leith in 1979, following the decision of Labour MP Ronald King Murray to retire. Brown went on to increase his majority to over 11,000 in the 1987 general election.

He was suspended from the House of Commons three times by the Speaker and once by the Parliamentary Labour Party. He was suspended twice in 1981: first, for five days in April 1981, for using unparliamentary language, after calling Conservative MP Nicholas Fairbairn a liar, and then for 20 days in July 1981 after he placed a protest banner on the Commons Table.

==== Poll tax ====
On 18 April 1988, Brown grabbed the House of Commons mace and threw it to the floor, damaging it, during a debate on the poll tax. The next day, he was to make a personal statement, the text of which had been agreed with the Speaker of the House of Commons. However, when he deviated from the agreed wording and refused to return to them he was asked to leave the chamber. His words were captured in Hansard, "Since you know the grovelling statement, Mr. Speaker, I am not going to read it out; I am going to accept it. Right? [HON. MEMBERS: "No."]".

This led to him to be suspended for 20 days. He also had to pay a £1,500 repair bill, and was suspended from the Labour Party for three months. During the poll tax protests he refused to pay his community charge, eventually appearing before a sheriff court.

In 1991 he visited Terry Fields MP, who had been imprisoned for 60 days for not paying his poll tax. He was accompanied by Jeremy Corbyn MP, Bernie Grant MP and Ken Livingstone MP. They made a secret recording of Fields, an action contrary to visitation rules. However, transgressing these rules carried no penalty. The group said the recording was made at the request of a journalist.

He was expelled from the Labour Party in 1991 after being fined £1,000 for criminal damage and deselected as the Labour candidate for Leith at the 1992 general election. He contested his seat as an Independent Labour candidate in 1992 but lost to the official Labour candidate Malcolm Chisholm, coming fifth with 10.3% of the vote.

==== Military affairs ====
===== Trade unions =====
During an anti-bullying campaign in the military Brown called for trade unions to be allowed in the UK armed forces. He believed that an NCO accused of bullying faced an assumption of guilt before a court martial. He was quoted as saying -

If trade unions were allowed to operate in the British armed services as they are in Sweden, injustices of the kind I suspect would not occur. If an individual who is badly treated happens to belong in the officers' quarters then he is protected by his own mafia. But the punters, from NCOs downwards, have no one to protect them.

— Ron Brown MP

==== Foreign affairs ====
===== Afghanistan =====
Brown visited Afghanistan and met President Babrak Karmal in 1981 along with fellow MPs Allan Roberts and Robert Litherland. He warned against Western support of the mujahideen rebels against the Soviets saying, "They are Muslim fanatics and they disagree with the extension of basic human rights. It's hard to have sympathy with them".

===== Libya =====
Brown was invited to attend a conference in Libya which was being held to mark the fifteenth anniversary of Colonel Gaddafi taking power. The visit proved controversial but Brown defended the move saying he wished to discuss the imprisoned Scottish engineer Robert Maxwell as well as the industrial dispute at the Jana news agency. The journalists at the London office had been on strike for five months.

===== Grenada =====
Following the United States invasion of Grenada, Brown called for the Trades Union Congress to back a boycott of the 1984 Summer Olympic Games in Los Angeles.

== KGB links ==
Brown met with KGB agent Oleg Gordievsky during the Cold War, the first meeting being in Annie's Bar at the House of Commons. Gordievsky confirmed the meeting but stated that Brown had not been paid and the meetings were not at a high level. However, Brown said that the meetings were not secret and that he believed Gordievsky was a journalist.

== Court trial ==
In 1989 Brown was tried on charges of theft (including jewellery and two pairs of women's underwear) plus criminal damage of £778 worth of property to his mistress. It was alleged that the damage was done to the home of his mistress Nonna Longden. He was found guilty of criminal damage and fined £1000 but found not guilty on the theft charge. He was also ordered to pay £2500 in prosecution costs and £628 in compensation.

== Later life ==
After leaving the House of Commons he remained active in public life, acting as president of the Edinburgh Trade Union Council.

Brown stood as a candidate for the Scottish Socialist Party in the inaugural election for the Scottish Parliament in 1999, but was not elected. He stayed with the SSP after the split with Tommy Sheridan and his breakaway Solidarity group.

Brown's wife May Smart, whom he married in 1963, died in 1995 and he himself died after a long illness caused by liver failure. He was survived by his two sons. A statement released by his family said: "He will be greatly missed not only by family and friends but by the many socialists and ordinary people whose lives he touched."

Parliament of the United Kingdom
Preceded by Ronald King Murray	Member of Parliament for Edinburgh Leith; 1979–1992	Succeeded by Malcolm Chisholm
