= Roxburgh, Selkirk and Peebles =

Parliamentary constituency in the United Kingdom, 1955–1983

- Former county constituency for the House of Commons

1955–1983
- Seats: One
- Created from: Roxburgh & Selkirk; Midlothian & Peebles
- Replaced by: Roxburgh & Berwickshire; Tweeddale, Ettrick & Lauderdale

Roxburgh, Selkirk and Peebles was a county constituency of the House of Commons of the Parliament of the United Kingdom (Westminster) from 1955 to 1983. It elected one Member of Parliament (MP) by the first past the post voting system.

== Boundaries ==
The constituency was first defined by the First Periodical Review of the Boundary Commission, and first used in the 1955 general election, to cover the counties of Roxburgh, Selkirk and Peebles.

The counties of Roxburgh and Selkirk were previously covered by the Roxburgh and Selkirk constituency, and the county of Peebles was previously covered by the Midlothian and Peebles constituency.

The boundaries of the Roxburgh, Selkirk and Peebles constituency were unaltered when the results of the Second Periodical Review were implemented for the February 1974 general election.

In 1975, Scottish counties were abolished under the Local Government (Scotland) Act 1973.

The Third Periodical Review took account of new local government boundaries, and results were implemented for the 1983 general election. The Roxburgh, Selkirk and Peebles constituency was abolished. The Roxburgh and Berwickshire constituency, related to the Roxburgh and Berwickshire districts of the Borders region, and the Tweeddale, Ettrick and Lauderdale constituency, related to the Tweeddale and Ettrick and Lauderdale districts of the same region, were created. The Tweedale district had been created with the boundaries of the former county of Peebles.

== Members of Parliament ==
Election	Member	Party	Notes
1955	Charles Donaldson	Unionist	Previously MP for Roxburgh and Selkirk from 1951; died December 1964
1965	David Steel	Liberal	Leader of the Liberal Party 1976–1988; subsequently MP for Tweeddale, Ettrick and Lauderdale from 1983
1983	constituency abolished		

== Election results ==
=== Elections in the 1950s ===
General election 1955: Roxburgh, Selkirk and Peebles
Party	Candidate	Votes	%	±%
Unionist	Charles Donaldson	21,925	47.69	
Liberal	Stanley E. Graham	14,755	32.09	
Labour	Lawrence A. Morrison	9,296	20.22	
Majority		7,170	15.60	
Turnout		45,976	80.79	
Unionist win (new seat)				

General election 1959: Roxburgh, Selkirk and Peebles
Party	Candidate	Votes	%	±%
Unionist	Charles Donaldson	22,275	50.20	
Liberal	John MacCormick	12,762	28.76	
Labour	Tam Dalyell	9,336	21.04	
Majority		9,513	21.44	
Turnout		44,373	80.01	
Unionist hold		Swing		

=== Elections in the 1960s ===
General election 1964: Roxburgh, Selkirk and Peebles
Party	Candidate	Votes	%	±%
Unionist	Charles Donaldson	18,924	42.81	−7.39
Liberal	David Steel	17,185	38.87	+10.11
Labour	Ronald Murray	7,007	15.85	−5.19
SNP	Anthony J. C. Kerr	1,093	2.47	New
Majority		1,739	3.94	−17.50
Turnout		44,209	82.24	+2.23
Unionist hold		Swing	-8.75	

1965 Roxburgh, Selkirk and Peebles by-election
Party	Candidate	Votes	%	±%
Liberal	David Steel	21,549	49.2	+10.4
Conservative	Sir Robert Lindley McEwen, 3rd Baronet	16,942	38.6	−4.2
Labour	Ronald Murray	4,936	11.2	−4.6
Independent Nationalist	Anthony J. C. Kerr	411	0.9	−1.6
Majority		4,607	10.6	N/A
Turnout		43,838	81.5	−0.7
Liberal gain from Conservative		Swing	+7.3	

General election 1966: Roxburgh, Selkirk and Peebles
Party	Candidate	Votes	%	±%
Liberal	David Steel	20,607	45.66	−3.5
Conservative	Ian McIntyre	18,396	40.76	+2.2
Labour	Colin Lindsay	6,131	13.58	+2.4
Majority		2,211	4.90	−5.7
Turnout		45,134	84.80	+3.3
Liberal hold		Swing	-2.9	

=== Elections in the 1970s ===
General election 1970: Roxburgh, Selkirk and Peebles
Party	Candidate	Votes	%	±%
Liberal	David Steel	19,524	42.26	−3.40
Conservative	Russell Fairgrieve	18,974	41.07	+0.31
Labour	Lionel Griffiths	4,454	9.64	−3.95
SNP	Hamish Hastie	3,147	6.81	New
Anti-Abortion	William R. Cassell	103	0.22	New
Majority		550	1.19	−2.71
Turnout		46,202	80.70	−4.10
Liberal hold		Swing	-1.86	

General election February 1974: Roxburgh, Selkirk & Peebles
Party	Candidate	Votes	%	±%
Liberal	David Steel	25,707	52.0	+9.7
Conservative	J. Stuart Thom	16,690	33.8	−7.3
SNP	David Purves	3,953	8.0	+1.2
Labour	David Allan Graham	3,089	6.2	−3.4
Majority		9,017	18.2	+17.0
Turnout		49,439	86.0	+5.3
Liberal hold		Swing		

General election October 1974: Roxburgh, Selkirk & Peebles
Party	Candidate	Votes	%	±%
Liberal	David Steel	20,006	43.6	−8.4
Conservative	Christine M. Anderson	12,573	27.4	−6.4
SNP	Angus Edmonds	9,178	20.0	+12.0
Labour	David Allan Graham	4,076	8.9	+2.7
Majority		7,433	16.2	−2.0
Turnout		45,833	79.3	−6.7
Liberal hold		Swing		

General election 1979: Roxburgh, Selkirk & Peebles
Party	Candidate	Votes	%	±%
Liberal	David Steel	25,993	53.1	+9.5
Conservative	Gerry Malone	15,303	31.3	+3.9
Labour	David Albert Heald	4,150	8.5	−0.4
SNP	Angus Stewart	3,502	7.2	−12.8
Majority		10,690	21.8	+5.6
Turnout		48,948	82.0	+2.7
Liberal hold		Swing	+6.7	

== See also ==
- 1965 Roxburgh, Selkirk and Peebles by-election
