= Battle for Britain (Private Eye) =

Battle for Britain was a comic strip cartoon published in the fortnightly satirical magazine Private Eye in the United Kingdom during the 1980s. It depicted Margaret Thatcher's second term of office as prime minister, but with the politicians shown as British soldiers or Nazi officials, as in a comic of the Second World War. The strip was attributed to Monty Stubble, which was a nom de plume of editor Ian Hislop, and to his artistic collaborator Nick Newman.

== Publication history ==
The name "Monty Stubble" is a play on the film-title I Was Monty's Double; the film being based upon the career of M. E. Clifton James, an actor who was employed during the Second World War to impersonate General Montgomery for the purposes of espionage and to confuse the enemy.

Battle For Britain appeared in Private Eye between 1983 and 1987. The series ended after the 1987 general election; this was explained by Private Eye as happening because Stubble "was tragically lost in action in the last week of the war, believed to have been hit by a stray pencil sharpener".

The collected strips were then published in book form by André Deutsch.

== Synopsis ==
In a tank Herr Thatchler leads the charge; Jock Steel and Doc "Killer" Owen are helplessly entrenched; and "Fatty" Heffer looks cynically on as "Taffy" Kinnock leads the retreat

The strip is considered to rank alongside the best to appear in the magazine. It was a satirical presentation of the struggles of the Labour Party opposition led by Neil Kinnock against the Conservative government led by Mrs Thatcher. The style borrowed liberally from Fleetway's War Picture Library comic series, and also D. C. Thomson & Co.'s Commando. In such comics the Germans were typically portrayed as one-dimensional stereotypes, uttering phrases such as "Dummkopf", "Der Teufel", "Donner und Blitzen", "Gott in Himmel", "Schweinhund", etc. seemingly spoken in the accents used by Nazi villains in British war films. This was reflected in Battle for Britain.

== The background ==
There were three groups of protagonists.

- The Conservative government is shown as a Fascist regime ruling the "Fatherland". Margaret Thatcher is depicted as the führer, "Herr Thatchler", a paranoid megalomaniac, served by her grovelling henchmen who include von Gummer (John Gummer), von Tebbit (Norman Tebbit), Helmut Lawson (Nigel Lawson), von Porkinson (Cecil Parkinson—the word "pork" being a play on Parkinson's affair with Sara Keays), Rudolph Hesseltine (a fusion of Michael Heseltine and Rudolf Hess) and Lord Howe-Howe (a play on Geoffrey Howe and Lord Haw-Haw, the wartime collaborator who was hanged for treason).
- The Labour Party opposition is portrayed as a platoon of British soldiers referred to as "the Marauders", battling against superior forces and always being defeated. They are led by the inexperienced Corporal "Taffy" Kinnock (Neil Kinnock—"taffy" is common slang for Welshman) and the turban-wearing "Darky" Chatterjee (Roy Hattersley, who was MP for Sparkbrook, a multi-racial constituency in Birmingham). The platoon is usually depicted as backbiting, inept, insubordinate and uncooperative, which is the main reason for its constant defeats. Much of Taffy's woe originates among his own followers, especially from left-wingers such as "Barmy" Benn (Tony Benn) and "Fatty" Heffer (Eric Heffer), whose "cruel cockney humour" often has the last word, lowering morale on his own side, and is a feature in almost every instalment.
- The SDP-Liberal Alliance (made up of the Social Democratic Party led by David Owen, and the Liberal Party led by David Steel) is referred to as "the Allies", led by Doc "Killer" Owen of the paramedics and "Wee" Jock Steel, the Tartan Terror. As in many satirical presentations (such as Spitting Image), Steel is shown as a weakling overshadowed by the dominant Owen. After failing to impress in the 1987 general election, the two parties merged to form the Liberal Democrats in 1988; the "jokey" image of the Alliance put across by satirists was a major factor in what was seen as a search for more "gravitas".

== The humour ==
The humour in the strip relied heavily on puns and put-downs, with characters often making cynical and unpleasant remarks at others on their own side. "Taffy" Kinnock in particular is always mocked by "Fatty" Heffer's cruel cockney humour. Meanwhile, von Gummer and later Jeffroech Archer (Jeffrey Archer) are referred to by Thatchler's other henchmen as "Gumkopf" and "Archcreep schwein". Hislop and Newman skilfully portrayed events in contemporary political life in terms of the fictional battle stories as depicted in the comic-books:

- By-election campaigns were shown as the liberation of French towns; Chesterfield (1984) became "Chester-le-Field" and Greenwich (1987) became "Greneviche".
- When government ministers were dismissed from office, Thatchler is shown ordering them to be taken out and shot.
- The UK miners' strike (1984–1985) is shown as "Sapper" Scargill (Arthur Scargill) leading Taffy's Marauders through some treacherous minefields.
- The campaign to abolish the Greater London Council (a body led in 1985 by Ken Livingstone) was fronted by Environment Secretary Patrick Jenkin. Monty Stubble depicted this as The Blitz—a raid on London led by bomber commander "Patroech Junkers" (a pun on Junkers Ju 88, a wartime German aircraft), opposed from RAF South Bank (a reference to County Hall, the GLC headquarters on London's South Bank) by Spitfire ace "Red" Ken (with "Red" a reference to Livingstone's far-left wing attitude—and, in real life, a frequent nickname for him).

== Example ==

This particular example of the strip was published in Private Eye in July 1986, at about the time when Parliament was about to go into recess.

- Labour had just won the Newcastle-under-Lyme by-election. Kinnock (holding the flag) was in the middle of a struggle to assert his authority as party leader in the face of an attempted takeover by the entryist Militant group, and had recently managed to expel leading Militant activist Derek Hatton from the party. Hatton (carrying the bag) is shown with fellow left-wingers (but not Militant members) Tony Benn (in the dress) and Eric Heffer.
- The Alliance had failed to gain the seat by about 800 votes. They had complained that the media were not giving them as much coverage as they felt their campaign deserved, which they alleged cost them a famous win.
- Thatcher was being heavily criticised by other Commonwealth leaders for her mildly lukewarm support for sanctions against the apartheid regime in South Africa led by President P.W. Botha.
- As a result, half the eligible participant countries boycotted the 1986 Commonwealth Games being held in Edinburgh.
- The Conservative Party was worried about its standing in the opinion polls, especially as speculation was starting to grow that a general election was likely to be held the following year.

== Aftermath ==
When the series ended in 1987, it was replaced by Dan Dire, Pilot of the Future?, which took a similar comic-book view of politics. This time, the model was Frank Hampson's artwork for Dan Dare, as seen in the popular 1950–1969 comic for boys Eagle. In keeping with the science fiction theme, Kinnock became "Dan Dire" (the questioning title was over whether or not he would ever be prime minister); Mrs Thatcher became "the Maggon" in reference to Dan Dare's arch-enemy the Mekon; and Owen became "Doctor Whowen", a reference to BBC sci-fi hero Doctor Who.

== Book ==
- Stubble, Monty; Nick Newman (1987). Battle for Britain. André Deutsch. ISBN 0-233-98136-5.
