= Anglo-Afghan Treaty of 1919 =

Treaty which ended the Third Anglo-Afghan War

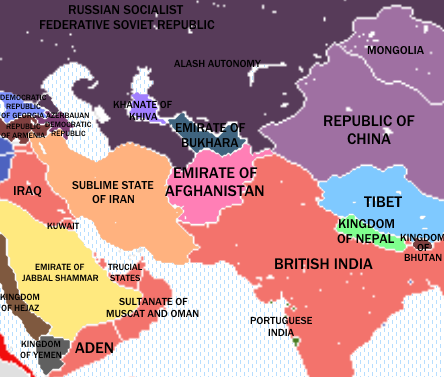
- Afghanistan in 1919
- Type: Bilateral Treaty
- Signed: 8 August 1919
- Location: Rawalpindi, Punjab, British India (present-day Punjab, Pakistan)
- Original signatories: United Kingdom; Afghanistan

The Anglo-Afghan Treaty of 1919, also known as the Treaty of Rawalpindi, was a bilateral treaty which brought the Third Anglo-Afghan War to an end.

== Background ==
The war had begun on 3rd May 1919, when the new emir of the Emirate of Afghanistan—Amanullah Khan— invaded British India. Despite some initial success, however, the Afghan invasion was repelled by the British. The Afghans were then driven back across the border while further Afghan incursions and tribal uprisings attacks were contained. The Royal Air Force were also used in bombing and strafing attacks on the frontier tribes as well as targets within Afghanistan, including Kabul and Jalalabad. With British and Indian troops potentially invading Afghanistan, Amanullah requested for an armistice, which was sent to the British Indian government on 31 May. The armistice went into effect on 3 June, and the fighting ended.

== Peace conference and treaty ==
The peace conference assembled at Rawalpindi on 27 July, amid much acrimony between the two parties. The British delegation (led by Sir Hamilton Grant) conceded recognition that Afghan foreign policy was a matter for the Afghans, but that they must reaffirm the Durand Line as the border between Afghanistan and British India.

The Afghans were not conciliatory, as they demanded the restoration of the Amir's subsidy, the payment of a war indemnity and recognition of Afghanistan's sovereignty over the whole of the Tribal Territory. As a result, the talks foundered several times and Grant sent a final ultimatum on 1 August, or hostilities would resume.

The Afghans reluctantly agreed; the treaty was signed on 8 August 1919 in Rawalpindi, Punjab, by the United Kingdom and the Emirate of Afghanistan. Britain recognised Afghanistan's independence (as per Article 5 of the treaty), agreed that British India would not extend past the Khyber Pass and stopped British subsidies to Afghanistan. Afghanistan also accepted all previously agreed border arrangements with British India as per Article 5. Thus, Afghanistan as an independent country agreed to recognise the Durand Line as international border between the two countries.

== See also ==
- First Anglo-Afghan War
