= David Steel =

Scottish politician (born 1938)

The Right Honourable The Lord Steel of Aikwood KT KBE PC
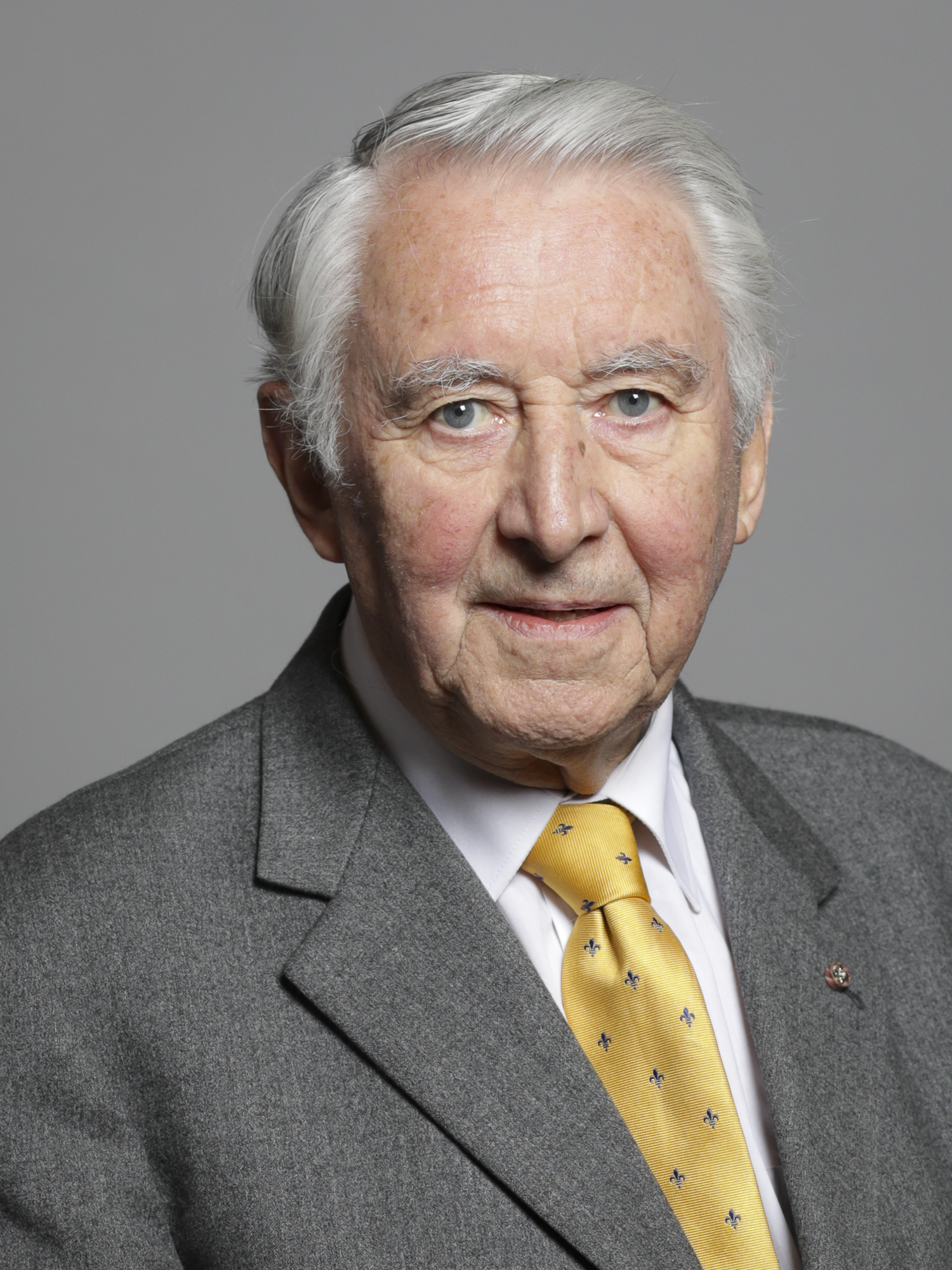
- Official portrait, 2020

Presiding Officer of the Scottish Parliament
- In office 12 May 1999 – 7 May 2003
- Monarch: Elizabeth II
- Deputy: Patricia Ferguson; George Reid; Murray Tosh
- Succeeded by: George Reid

Acting Leader of the Liberal Democrats
- In office 3 March 1988 – 16 July 1988 Serving with Robert Maclennan
- Preceded by: Himself (Lib.); Robert Maclennan (SDP)
- Succeeded by: Paddy Ashdown

Leader of the Liberal Party
- In office 7 July 1976 – 16 July 1988
- Deputy: John Pardoe (1976–1979); Alan Beith (1985–1988)
- President: List: Basil Goldstone; Gruffydd Evans; Michael Steed; Richard Holme; Viv Bingham; John Griffiths; Geoff Tordoff; Alan Watson; David Penhaligon; Des Wilson; Adrian Slade
- Preceded by: Jo Grimond (acting)
- Succeeded by: Paddy Ashdown (Leader of the Social and Liberal Democrats)

Chief Whip of the Liberal Party
- In office 18 June 1970 – 7 July 1976
- Leader: Jeremy Thorpe; Jo Grimond
- Preceded by: Eric Lubbock
- Succeeded by: Cyril Smith
Parliamentary offices
Member of the House of Lords
Lord Temporal
Life peerage 6 June 1997 – 27 March 2020
Member of the Scottish Parliament for Lothians (1 of 7 Regional MSPs)
In office 6 May 1999 – 31 March 2003
Member of Parliament for Tweeddale, Ettrick, and Lauderdale Roxburgh, Selkirk and Peebles (1965–1983)
In office 24 March 1965 – 8 April 1997
Preceded by	Charles Donaldson
Succeeded by	Michael Moore

Personal details
- Born: David Martin Scott Steel; 31 March 1938 (age 88) Kirkcaldy, Scotland
- Party: Independent (1999–2003, (Note: During tenure as Presiding Officer of the Scottish Parliament) 2020–present)
- Other political affiliations: Liberal Democrats (1988–2020); Liberal (until 1988)
- Spouse: Judith MacGregor (m. 1962)
- Children: 3
- Parent: David Steel
- Education: University of Edinburgh

David Martin Scott Steel, Baron Steel of Aikwood (born 31 March 1938) is a Scottish retired politician. Elected as Member of Parliament for Roxburgh, Selkirk and Peebles, followed by Tweeddale, Ettrick, and Lauderdale, he served as the final leader of the Liberal Party, from 1976 to 1988. His tenure spanned the duration of the alliance with the Social Democratic Party, which began in 1981 and concluded with the formation of the Liberal Democrats in 1988. As an MP, he introduced the Abortion Act 1967 which legalised abortion in the UK.

Steel served as a Member of the UK Parliament for 32 years, from 1965 to 1997, and as a Member of the Scottish Parliament (MSP) from 1999 to 2003, during which time he was the parliament's Presiding Officer. He was a member of the House of Lords as a life peer from 1997 to 2020. Steel resigned from the House of Lords after the Independent Inquiry into Child Sexual Abuse accused him of an "abdication of responsibility" over his failure to investigate allegations of child sex abuse against the former Liberal MP Sir Cyril Smith.

== Early life and education ==
Steel was born in Kirkcaldy, Fife, the son of a Church of Scotland minister also called David Steel, who would later serve as Moderator of the General Assembly of the Church of Scotland. He was brought up in Scotland and Kenya, and educated at Dumbarton Academy; James Gillespie's Boys' School, Edinburgh; the Prince of Wales School, Nairobi; and George Watson's College, Edinburgh, followed by the University of Edinburgh, where he first took an active part in Liberal politics, and was elected Senior President of the Students' Representative Council, and graduated in Law.

== Political career ==
After university, Steel worked for the Scottish Liberal Party, and then the BBC, before being elected to the House of Commons as the MP for Roxburgh, Selkirk and Peebles at the 1965 by-election, just before his 27th birthday, becoming the "Baby of the House". He represented this seat until 1983, when he was elected in Tweeddale, Ettrick, and Lauderdale, a new constituency covering much of the same territory. From 1966 to 1970, Steel was president of the British Anti-Apartheid Movement campaign.

As an MP, Steel was responsible for introducing, as a Private member's bill, the Abortion Act 1967, and has argued for greater liberalisation of this legislation in recent years (see Abortion in the United Kingdom). He also became the Liberal Party's spokesman on employment, and, in 1970, its Chief Whip.

=== Leader of Liberal Party ===
In 1976, following the downfall of Jeremy Thorpe, and a short period in which Jo Grimond acted as caretaker leader, he won the Liberal leadership by a wide margin over John Pardoe. At only 38 years old, he was one of the youngest party leaders in British history. In March 1977, he led the Liberals into the "Lib–Lab pact". The Liberals agreed to support the Labour government, whose narrow majority since the general election in October 1974 had been gradually eroded and left them as a minority government, in power, in return for a degree of prior consultation on policy. This pact lasted until August 1978.

Steel was criticised, both then and since, for not driving a harder bargain. However, Steel's defenders contend that the continuing scandal surrounding Thorpe left the party in a very weak state to face an early general election, and Steel was wise to buy himself some time from Prime Minister James Callaghan. At the same time, the growing unpopularity of the Labour government impaired the Liberals' performance, and Steel's first election as leader, the 1979 general election, saw a net two-seat loss for the Liberals.

=== SDP–Liberal Alliance ===
In 1981, a group of Labour moderates left their party to form the Social Democratic Party. They were joined by the former Labour deputy leader, Chancellor of the Exchequer and Home Secretary Roy Jenkins, who had previously had discussions with Steel about joining the Liberals. Under Jenkins' leadership, the SDP joined the Liberals in the SDP–Liberal Alliance. In its early days, the Alliance showed so much promise that for a time, it looked like the Liberals would be part of a government for the first time since 1945. Opinion polls were showing Alliance support as high as 50% by late 1981. Steel was so confident that he felt able to tell delegates at the Liberal Assembly that year: "Go back to your constituencies, and prepare for government." In the wake of the 1981 Croydon North West by-election, where Liberal candidate Bill Pitt came from third position to easily gain the Alliance's first by-election victory, Steel's reaction to the result was to state that his belief "that we are now unstoppable."

Steel had genuine hopes at that stage that the Alliance would win the next general election and form a coalition government. However, the beginning of the Falklands War the following spring radically shifted the attitude of the electorate, and the Conservatives regained the lead in polls from the Alliance by a wide margin. The Alliance secured more than 25% of the vote at the 1983 general election, almost as many votes as Labour. However, its support was spread out across the country, and was not concentrated in enough areas to translate into seats under the first past the post system. This left the Alliance with only 23 seats — 17 for the Liberals, and six for the SDP. Steel's dreams of a big political breakthrough were left unfulfilled.

Shortly afterwards, the former Labour Foreign Secretary David Owen replaced Jenkins as leader of the SDP, and the troubled leadership of the "Two Davids" was inaugurated. It was never an easy relationship—Steel's political sympathies were well to the left of Owen's. Owen had a marked antipathy towards the Liberals, though he respected Steel's prior loyalty to his own party contrasting it with Jenkins' lack of interest in preserving the SDP's independence. The relationship was also mercilessly satirised by Spitting Image which portrayed Steel as a squeaky voiced midget, literally in the pocket of Owen. Steel has often stated that he feels this portrayal seriously damaged his image. This portrayal of Steel as weaker than Owen was also present in other satires, such as Private Eye's Battle for Britain strip. The relationship finally fell apart during the 1987 general election when the two contradicted each other, both on defence policy and on which party they would do a deal with in the event of a hung parliament.

=== Two parties merge ===
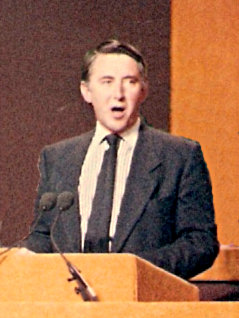
Steel addressing the Liberal Party assembly in Harrogate on merger in 1987

Steel was convinced the answer to these difficulties was a single party with a single leader, and was the chief proponent of the 1988 merger between the Liberals and the SDP. He emerged victorious in persuading both parties to accept merger in the teeth of opposition from Owen and radical Liberals such as Michael Meadowcroft, but badly mishandled the issuing of a joint policy document. Steel had often been criticised for a lack of interest in policy, and it appeared he had agreed to the document – drawn up by politically naive SDP advisers – without reading it. His colleagues rejected it immediately and demanded a redraft, fatally wounding his authority.

Steel was briefly joint interim leader of the Social and Liberal Democrats (as the new party was at first called) in the run-up to elections in which he did not stand, before becoming the party's foreign affairs spokesman. In 1989, he accepted an invitation from Italian Liberals to stand for the European Parliament in the 1989 election as a Pan-European gesture, but was not elected.

Steel became President of the Liberal International in 1994, holding the office until 1996.

=== Life peerage and Scottish Parliament ===
Steel retired from the House of Commons at the 1997 general election and was made a life peer as Baron Steel of Aikwood, of Ettrick Forest in the Scottish Borders, on 6 June 1997. He campaigned for Scottish devolution, and in 1999 was elected to the Scottish Parliament as a Liberal Democrat MSP for Lothians. He became the first Presiding Officer (speaker) of the Scottish Parliament on 12 May 1999.

In this role, he used the style "Sir David Steel", despite his peerage. He suspended his Liberal Democrat membership for the duration of his tenure as Presiding Officer, believing that the post, like the Speaker of the UK House of Commons, should be strictly nonpartisan. All subsequent Presiding Officers have followed this practice.

Steel stepped down as an MSP when the parliament was dissolved for the 2003 election, but remained as Presiding Officer until he had supervised the election of his successor George Reid on 7 May of that year. He was appointed Lord High Commissioner to the General Assembly of the Church of Scotland in both 2003 and 2004.

=== Cyril Smith child sex abuse scandal ===
On 14 March 2019, Steel was suspended by the Liberal Democrats after an admission that discussions he had conducted in 1979 with the then Liberal MP for Rochdale Cyril Smith, at a time when Steel was leader of the Liberal Party, had led him to conclude that Smith had been a sexual abuser of children in the 1960s and that Steel nonetheless failed to instigate any assessment by the party of whether Smith was an on-going risk to children. Richard Scorer, representing victims at the Independent Inquiry into Child Sexual Abuse, called for him to be stripped of his peerage. On 14 May 2019, the Liberal Democrats ruled that there were "no grounds for action" against Steel and reinstated him to party membership.

On 25 February 2020, Steel announced his resignation from the Liberal Democrats and subsequently his position as a member of the House of Lords, after admitting that during his leadership of the Liberal Party he "assumed" that Smith had been a child abuser, and failed to investigate claims made by Private Eye against Smith, dating from before Smith was a party member. This came about after the Independent Inquiry into Child Sexual Abuse accused Steel of an "abdication of responsibility" over allegations against Smith. He retired officially from the House of Lords on 27 March 2020.

== Honours and awards ==
Coat of arms of David Steel
Crest A jaguar salient Proper Escutcheon Azure in chief two furisons Or in base a tower Argent port and windows Sable on a chief Argent dexter on a gonfannon Purpure a saltire equisee Argent the gonfannon pendent from a pole fessways Purpure between two chords each Purpure and Argent and sinister a portcullis chained Sable. Supporters Dexter a Masai warrior sinister a border reiver Proper. Motto Vir Tamen Aurum Est (The Man's The Gold For A'That)

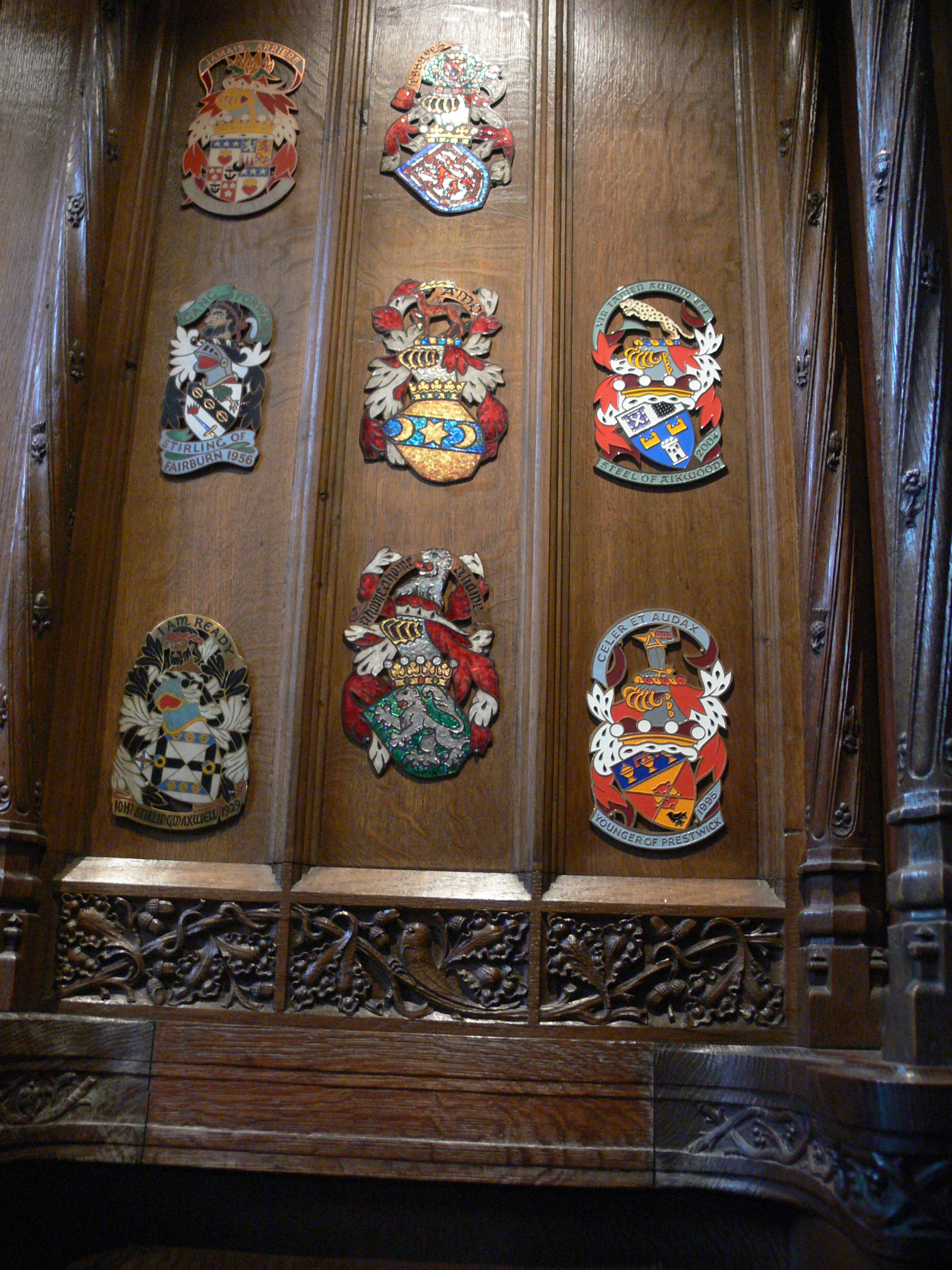
Steel's stall in the Thistle Chapel, St Giles' Cathedral, Edinburgh. His arms can be seen on the right, with the crest of a springing jaguar.

Steel was appointed a Knight Commander of the Order of the British Empire (KBE) in the 1990 New Year Honours for political and public service. On 30 November 2004, Queen Elizabeth created Lord Steel a Knight of the Order of the Thistle, the highest honour in Scotland.

Steel has also received numerous foreign honours, including: Commander's Cross of the Order of Merit (Germany) in 1992; Chevalier in the Légion d'Honneur (France) in 2003; and Honorary Knight of the Order of St. George (Habsburg-Lorraine) in 2016.

Steel has received a number of Honorary Doctorates from many universities including Heriot-Watt University, Edinburgh, Aberdeen and Stirling.

== Personal life and family ==
Steel married fellow law graduate Judith Mary MacGregor in October 1962. They resided at Aikwood Tower in the Borders of Scotland for twenty years, but now live in Selkirk. They have two sons and a daughter, and nine grandchildren. In 1995, his elder son Graeme was convicted for growing cannabis at his house, and sent to prison for nine months. One of his granddaughters, Hannah, was elected to Scottish Borders Council (representing the Galashiels and District ward) in the 2022 Scottish local elections.

His recreations are angling and classic car rallying: he won the bronze medallion in 1998 for London to Cape Town. He is a member of the National Liberal and Royal Over-Seas League clubs.

Steel was featured in his own episode of the Channel 4 documentary series Empire's Children (2007) which explored his family background, particularly his father's attempt to save the African people from British internment camps during the Mau Mau rebellion.

Steel served as President of the charity Medical Aid for Palestinians for seven years and visited both the West Bank and Gaza during his tenure.

Parliament of the United Kingdom
Preceded by Charles Donaldson	Member of Parliament for Roxburgh, Selkirk and Peebles; 1965–1983	Constituency abolished
New constituency	Member of Parliament for Tweeddale, Ettrick and Lauderdale; 1983–1997	Succeeded by Michael Moore
Preceded by Teddy Taylor	Baby of the House; 1965–1966	Succeeded by John Ryan
Preceded by Otto Graf Lambsdorff	President of the Liberal International; 1994–1996	Succeeded by Frits Bolkestein
Party political offices
Preceded by Eric Lubbock	Liberal Party Chief Whip; 1970–1976	Succeeded by Cyril Smith
Preceded by Jo Grimond	Leader of the Liberal Party; 1976–1988	Party merged with SDP
New political party	Leader of the Social and Liberal Democrats; 1988 with Robert Maclennan	Succeeded by Paddy Ashdown
Scottish Parliament
New creation	Member of the Scottish Parliament for Lothians; 1999–2003	Succeeded by Mark Ballard
New creation	Presiding Officer of the Scottish Parliament; 1999–2003	Succeeded by George Reid
Academic offices
Preceded by Anthony Ross	Rector of the University of Edinburgh; 1982–1985	Succeeded by Archie Macpherson
Orders of precedence in the United Kingdom
Preceded by The Lord Howell of Guildford	Gentlemen; Baron Steel of Aikwood	Followed by The Lord Alton of Liverpool
