= 1986 United Kingdom local elections =

- 8 May 1986

All 32 London boroughs, all 36 metropolitan boroughs, 123 out of 296 English districts, 1 local education authority and all 12 Scottish regions
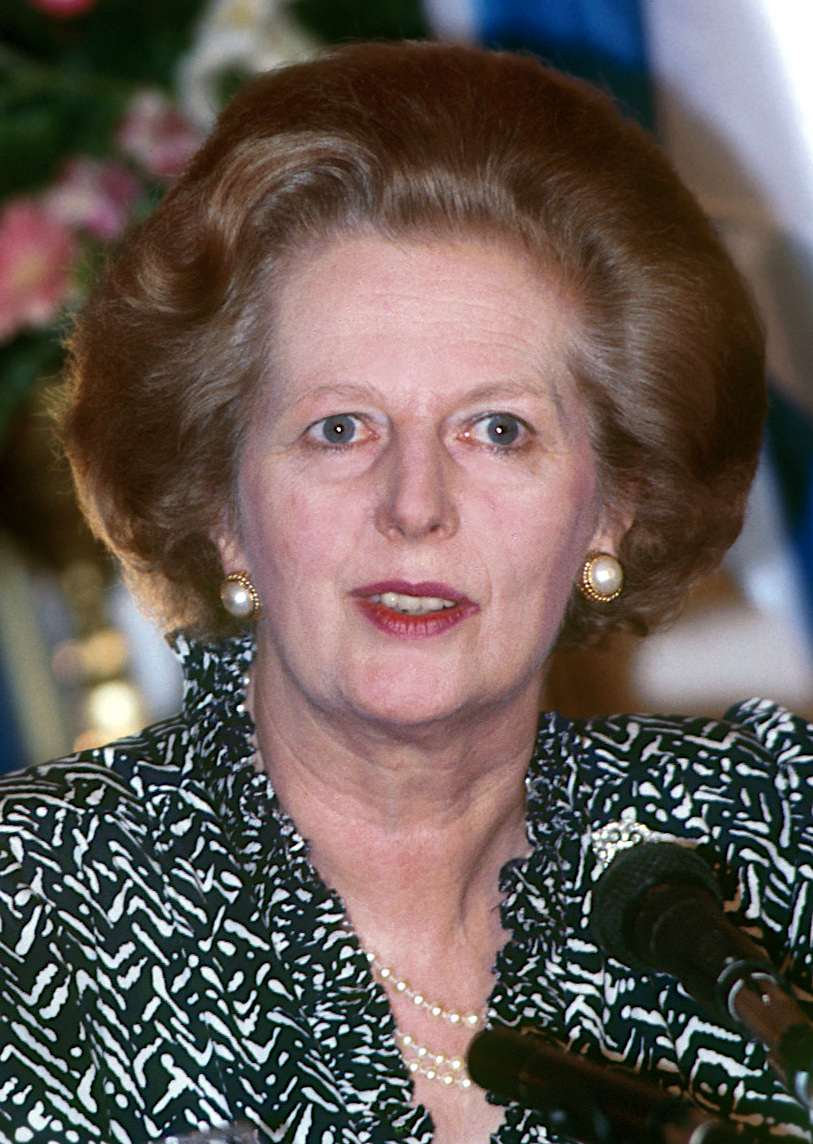

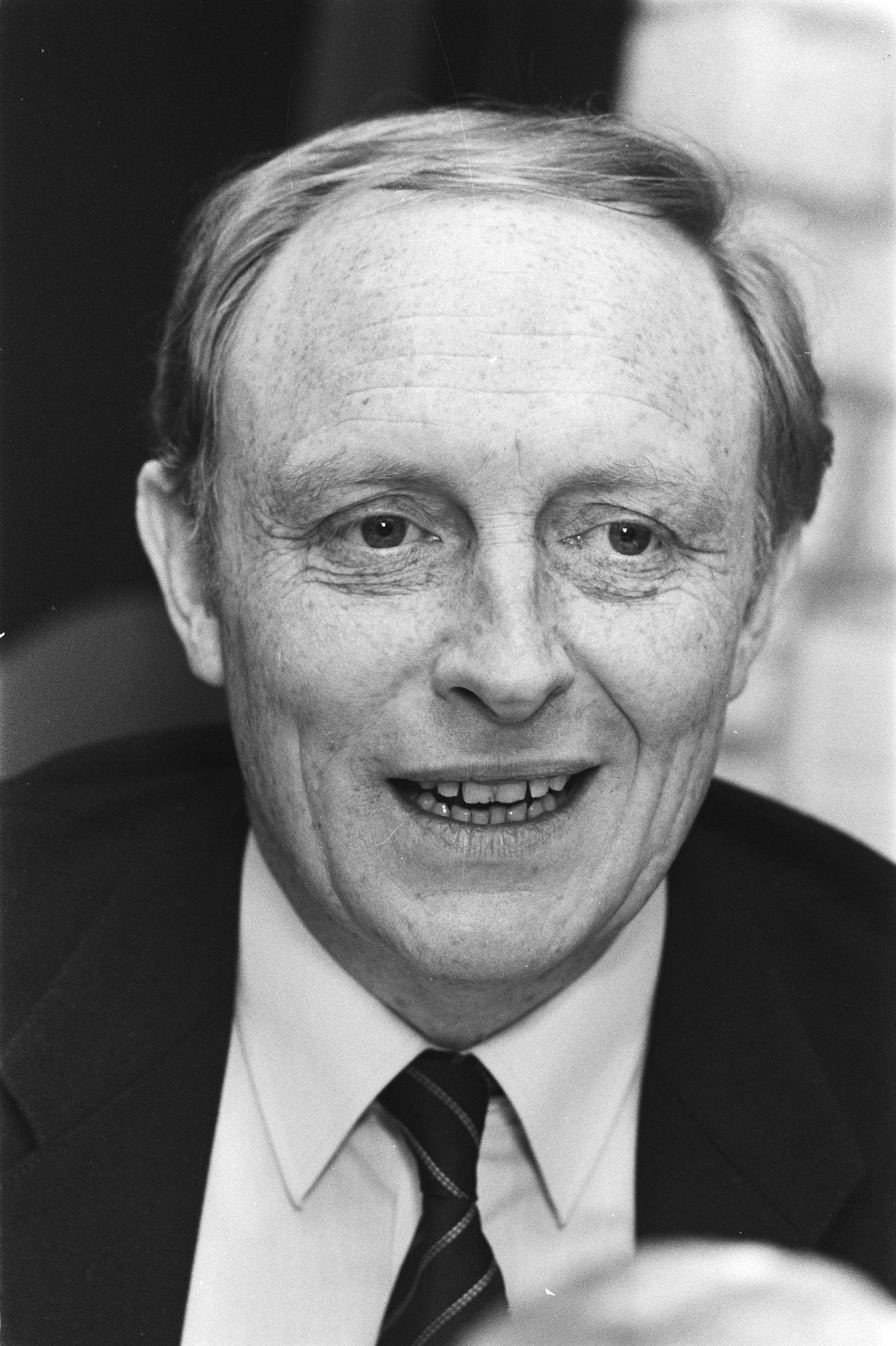

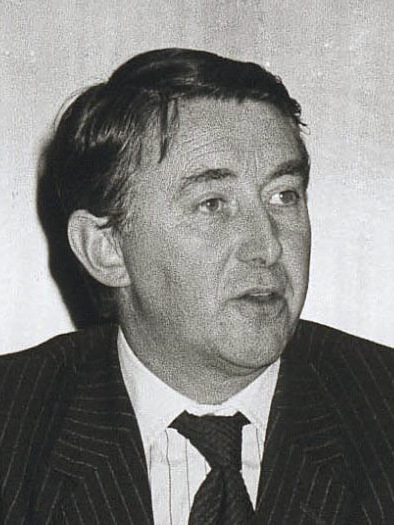

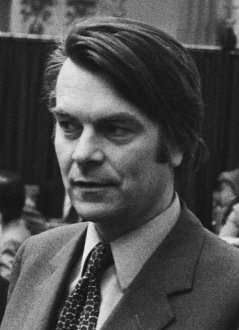
	Majority party	Minority party	Third party
Leader	Margaret Thatcher	Neil Kinnock	David Steel and David Owen
Party	Conservative	Labour	Alliance
Leader since	11 February 1975	2 October 1983	7 July 1976 and 21 June 1983
Percentage	34%	37%	26%
Councillors +/-	▼975	▲13	▲338

The 1986 United Kingdom local elections were held on Thursday 8 May 1986. There was a 3% reduction in the number of councillors, owing to the abolition of the Greater London Council and the Metropolitan County Councils.

The national projected share of the vote was Labour 37%, Conservative 34%, Liberal-SDP Alliance 26%. The Conservatives lost 975 seats, Labour gained 13 seats and the Liberal-SDP Alliance gained 338 seats.

Two parliamentary by-elections were also held on the same day in the West Derbyshire and Ryedale constituencies. The Conservatives held West Derbyshire, though only by 100 votes. The Alliance gained Ryedale from the Conservatives.

The elections were delayed a week from the usual date of the first Thursday in May, due to 1 May 1986 falling within Passover.

== England ==
=== London boroughs ===
In all 32 London boroughs the whole council was up for election.

Council	Previous control	Result	Details
Barking and Dagenham	Labour	Labour hold	Details
Barnet	Conservative	Conservative hold	Details
Bexley	Conservative	Conservative hold	Details
Brent	Labour	Labour hold	Details
Bromley	Conservative	Conservative hold	Details
Camden	Labour	Labour hold	Details
Croydon	Conservative	Conservative hold	Details
Ealing	Conservative	Labour gain	Details
Enfield	Conservative	Conservative hold	Details
Greenwich	Labour	Labour hold	Details
Hackney	Labour	Labour hold	Details
Hammersmith and Fulham	No overall control	Labour gain	Details
Haringey	Labour	Labour hold	Details
Harrow	Conservative	Conservative hold	Details
Havering	Conservative	No overall control gain	Details
Hillingdon	Conservative	No overall control gain	Details
Hounslow	Labour	Labour hold	Details
Islington	Labour	Labour hold	Details
Kensington and Chelsea	Conservative	Conservative hold	Details
Kingston upon Thames	Conservative	No overall control gain	Details
Lambeth	No overall control	Labour gain	Details
Lewisham	Labour	Labour hold	Details
Merton	Conservative	Conservative hold	Details
Newham	Labour	Labour hold	Details
Redbridge	Conservative	Conservative hold	Details
Richmond upon Thames	Conservative	Alliance gain	Details
Southwark	Labour	Labour hold	Details
Sutton	Conservative	Alliance gain	Details
Tower Hamlets	Labour	Alliance gain	Details
Waltham Forest	No overall control	Labour gain	Details
Wandsworth	Conservative	Conservative hold	Details
Westminster	Conservative	Conservative hold	Details

=== Metropolitan boroughs ===
All 36 metropolitan borough councils had one third of their seats up for election.

Council	Previous control	Result	Details
Barnsley	Labour	Labour hold	Details
Birmingham	Labour	Labour hold	Details
Bolton	Labour	Labour hold	Details
Bradford	No overall control	Labour gain	Details
Bury	Conservative	Labour gain	Details
Calderdale	No overall control	No overall control hold	Details
Coventry	Labour	Labour hold	Details
Doncaster	Labour	Labour hold	Details
Dudley	No overall control	Labour gain	Details
Gateshead	Labour	Labour hold	Details
Kirklees	Labour	No overall control gain	Details
Knowsley	Labour	Labour hold	Details
Leeds	Labour	Labour hold	Details
Liverpool	Labour	Labour hold	Details
Manchester	Labour	Labour hold	Details
Newcastle upon Tyne	Labour	Labour hold	Details
North Tyneside	Labour	No overall control gain	Details
Oldham	Labour	Labour hold	Details
Rochdale	No overall control	Labour gain	Details
Rotherham	Labour	Labour hold	Details
Salford	Labour	Labour hold	Details
Sandwell	Labour	Labour hold	Details
Sefton	Conservative	No overall control gain	Details
Sheffield	Labour	Labour hold	Details
Solihull	Conservative	Conservative hold	Details
South Tyneside	Labour	Labour hold	Details
St Helens	Labour	Labour hold	Details
Stockport	No overall control	No overall control hold	Details
Sunderland	Labour	Labour hold	Details
Tameside	Labour	Labour hold	Details
Trafford	Conservative	No overall control gain	Details
Wakefield	Labour	Labour hold	Details
Walsall	No overall control	No overall control hold	Details
Wigan	Labour	Labour hold	Details
Wirral	Conservative	No overall control gain	Details
Wolverhampton	Labour	Labour hold	Details

=== District councils ===
==== Whole council ====
In 2 districts the whole council was up for election.

In 2 districts there were new ward boundaries, following further electoral boundary reviews by the Local Government Boundary Commission for England.

Council	Previous control	Result	Details
Halton ‡	Labour	Labour hold	Details
Thamesdown ‡	Labour	Labour hold	Details

‡ New ward boundaries

==== Third of council ====
In 121 districts one third of the council was up for election.

Council	Previous control	Result	Details
Adur	No overall control	Alliance gain	Details
Amber Valley	Labour	Labour hold	Details
Barrow-in-Furness	Labour	Labour hold	Details
Basildon	Labour	Labour hold	Details
Basingstoke and Deane	No overall control	Conservative gain	Details
Bassetlaw	Labour	Labour hold	Details
Bath	Conservative	Conservative hold	Details
Blackburn	No overall control	Labour gain	Details
Brentwood	Conservative	Conservative hold	Details
Brighton	No overall control	No overall control hold	Details
Bristol	No overall control	Labour gain	Details
Broadland	Conservative	Conservative hold	Details
Broxbourne	Conservative	Conservative hold	Details
Burnley	Labour	Labour hold	Details
Cambridge	No overall control	Labour gain	Details
Cannock Chase	No overall control	No overall control hold	Details
Carlisle	Labour	Labour hold	Details
Cheltenham	No overall control	No overall control hold	Details
Cherwell	Conservative	Conservative hold	Details
Chester	Conservative	No overall control gain	Details
Chorley	No overall control	No overall control hold	Details
Colchester	Conservative	No overall control gain	Details
Congleton	Conservative	No overall control gain	Details
Craven	Conservative	No overall control gain	Details
Crawley	Labour	Labour hold	Details
Crewe and Nantwich	No overall control	No overall control hold	Details
Daventry	Conservative	Conservative hold	Details
Derby	Labour	Labour hold	Details
East Devon	Conservative	Conservative hold	Details
Eastbourne	No overall control	Alliance gain	Details
Eastleigh	No overall control	No overall control hold	Details
Ellesmere Port and Neston	Labour	Labour hold	Details
Elmbridge	Conservative	No overall control gain	Details
Epping Forest	Conservative	Conservative hold	Details
Exeter	No overall control	No overall control hold	Details
Fareham	Conservative	No overall control gain	Details
Gillingham	Conservative	Conservative hold	Details
Gloucester	No overall control	No overall control hold	Details
Gosport	Conservative	Conservative hold	Details
Great Grimsby	No overall control	Labour gain	Details
Great Yarmouth	Conservative	No overall control gain	Details
Harlow	Labour	Labour hold	Details
Harrogate	Conservative	Conservative hold	Details
Hart	No overall control	No overall control hold	Details
Hartlepool	Labour	Labour hold	Details
Hastings	No overall control	No overall control hold	Details
Havant	Conservative	Conservative hold	Details
Hereford	Alliance	Alliance hold	Details
Hertsmere	Conservative	Conservative hold	Details
Hinckley and Bosworth	Conservative	Conservative hold	Details
Huntingdonshire	Conservative	Conservative hold	Details
Hyndburn	Conservative	Labour gain	Details
Ipswich	Labour	Labour hold	Details
Kingston upon Hull	Labour	Labour hold	Details
Leicester	Labour	Labour hold	Details
Leominster	Independent	Independent hold	Details
Lincoln	Labour	Labour hold	Details
Macclesfield	Conservative	Conservative hold	Details
Maidstone	No overall control	No overall control hold	Details
Mid Sussex	Conservative	Conservative hold	Details
Milton Keynes	No overall control	No overall control hold	Details
Mole Valley	No overall control	No overall control hold	Details
Newcastle-under-Lyme	Labour	Labour hold	Details
North Bedfordshire	Conservative	No overall control gain	Details
North Hertfordshire	Conservative	Conservative hold	Details
Norwich	Labour	Labour hold	Details
Nuneaton and Bedworth	Labour	Labour hold	Details
Oadby and Wigston	Conservative	Conservative hold	Details
Oxford	Labour	Labour hold	Details
Pendle	No overall control	No overall control hold	Details
Penwith	Independent	No overall control gain	Details
Peterborough	No overall control	No overall control hold	Details
Portsmouth	Conservative	Conservative hold	Details
Preston	Labour	Labour hold	Details
Purbeck	Independent	No overall control gain	Details
Reading	Conservative	No overall control gain	Details
Redditch	Labour	Labour hold	Details
Reigate and Banstead	Conservative	Conservative hold	Details
Rochford	Conservative	Conservative hold	Details
Rossendale	Conservative	Labour gain	Details
Rugby	No overall control	No overall control hold	Details
Runnymede	Conservative	Conservative hold	Details
Rushmoor	Conservative	Conservative hold	Details
Scunthorpe	Labour	Labour hold	Details
Shrewsbury and Atcham	No overall control	No overall control hold	Details
Slough	Labour	Labour hold	Details
South Bedfordshire	Conservative	Conservative hold	Details
South Cambridgeshire	Independent	Independent hold	Details
South Herefordshire	Independent	Independent hold	Details
South Lakeland	No overall control	No overall control hold	Details
Southampton	Labour	Labour hold	Details
Southend-on-Sea	Conservative	Conservative hold	Details
St Albans	No overall control	No overall control hold	Details
Stevenage	Labour	Labour hold	Details
Stoke-on-Trent	Labour	Labour hold	Details
Stratford-on-Avon	Conservative	Conservative hold	Details
Stroud	No overall control	No overall control hold	Details
Swale	Conservative	No overall control gain	Details
Tamworth	Conservative	Labour gain	Details
Tandridge	Conservative	Conservative hold	Details
Three Rivers	Conservative	No overall control gain	Details
Thurrock	Labour	Labour hold	Details
Tonbridge and Malling	Conservative	Conservative hold	Details
Torbay	Conservative	Conservative hold	Details
Tunbridge Wells	Conservative	Conservative hold	Details
Watford	Labour	Labour hold	Details
Waveney	Conservative	No overall control gain	Details
Welwyn Hatfield	Labour	Labour hold	Details
West Dorset	Independent	Independent hold	Details
West Lancashire	Conservative	No overall control gain	Details
West Lindsey	No overall control	No overall control hold	Details
West Oxfordshire	No overall control	No overall control hold	Details
Weymouth and Portland	No overall control	No overall control hold	Details
Winchester	Conservative	Conservative hold	Details
Woking	Conservative	No overall control gain	Details
Wokingham	Conservative	Conservative hold	Details
Woodspring	Conservative	Conservative hold	Details
Worcester	No overall control	Labour gain	Details
Worthing	Conservative	Conservative hold	Details
Wyre Forest	No overall control	No overall control hold	Details
York	No overall control	Labour gain	Details

=== Local education authority ===
This was the first and only election to the directly elected local education authority established by the Local Government Act 1985. However, it was short-lived, being abolished four years later by the Education Reform Act 1988.

Council	Previous control	Result	Details
Inner London Education Authority	New Council	Labour	Details

== Scotland ==
=== Regional councils ===
Council	Previous control	Result	Details
Borders	Independent	Independent hold	Details
Central	Labour	Labour hold	Details
Dumfries and Galloway	Independent	Independent hold	Details
Fife	Labour	Labour hold	Details
Grampian	Conservative	No overall control gain	Details
Highland	Independent	Independent hold	Details
Lothian	No overall control	Labour gain	Details
Orkney	Independent	Independent hold	Details
Shetland	Independent	Independent hold	Details
Strathclyde	Labour	Labour hold	Details
Tayside	Conservative	No overall control gain	Details
Western Isles	Independent	Independent hold	Details
