= 1986 Colchester Borough Council election =

1986 English local government election

- 8 May 1986

21 out of 60 seats to Colchester Borough Council 31 seats needed for a majority
- Registered: 93,849
- Turnout: 41.6% (▼0.3%)
	First party	Second party	Third party
Party	Conservative	Alliance	Labour
Last election	34 seats, 42.9%	10 seats, 25.1%	11 seats, 28.2%
Seats won	6	8	5
Seats after	28	17	11
Seat change	▼6	▲6	Steady
Popular vote	13,873	14,988	11,185
Percentage	33.3%	36.0%	26.9%
Swing	▼9.6%	▲10.9%	▼1.3%
	Fourth party	Fifth party
Party	Residents	Independent
Last election	3 seats, 2.3%	1 seat, 1.5%
Seats won	1	1
Seats after	3	1
Seat change	Steady	Steady
Popular vote	1,110	459
Percentage	2.7%	1.1%
Swing	▲0.4%	▼0.4%
- Winner of each seat at the 1986 Colchester Borough Council election.
Council control before election
Conservative
Council control after election
No overall control

The 1986 Colchester Borough Council election took place on 8 May 1986 to elect members of Colchester Borough Council in Essex, England. This was on the same day as other local elections across the United Kingdom.

At the election, the Conservative Party lost control of the council to no overall control after having held an overall majority since the 1976 election.

== Summary ==
=== Election result ===
1986 Colchester Borough Council election
Party	This election				Full council			This election		
Party	Candidates	Seats	Net	Seats %	Other	Total	Total %	Votes	Votes %	+/−
Conservative	20	6	▼6	28.6	22	28	46.7	13,873	33.3	–9.6
Alliance	20	8	▲6	38.1	9	17	26.7	14,988	36.0	+10.9
Labour	21	5	Steady	23.8	6	11	20.0	11,185	26.9	–1.3
Residents	1	1	Steady	4.8	2	3	5.0	1,110	2.7	+0.4
Independent	2	1	Steady	4.8	0	1	1.7	459	1.1	–0.4

== Ward results ==
=== Berechurch ===
Berechurch
Party	Candidate	Votes	%	±%
Alliance	M. Bayliss	1,235	43.6	+6.2
Labour	B. McQuitty*	1,115	39.4	+2.4
Conservative	A. Kimberley	483	17.0	−8.6
Majority		120	4.2	+3.9
Turnout		2,833	47.0	+8.4
Registered electors		6,029		
Alliance gain from Labour		Swing	▲1.9	

=== Birch-Messing ===
Birch-Messing
Party	Candidate	Votes	%	±%
Independent	T. Wayman*	422	63.9	−12.2
Alliance	A. Chataway	187	28.3	+11.2
Labour	J. Brice	51	7.7	−0.9
Majority		235	35.6	−23.3
Turnout		660	48.5	−2.3
Registered electors		1,361		
Independent hold		Swing	▼11.7	

=== Boxted & Langham ===
Boxted & Langham
Party	Candidate	Votes	%	±%
Conservative	C. Garnett*	600	63.0	−0.1
Alliance	D. Elmer	261	27.4	−1.8
Labour	S. Vanplew	91	9.6	+1.9
Majority		339	35.6	+1.8
Turnout		952	50.3	−4.3
Registered electors		1,894		
Conservative hold		Swing	▲0.9	

=== Castle ===
Castle
Party	Candidate	Votes	%	±%
Labour	Ken Cooke*	1,090	39.8	+4.8
Alliance	Chris Hall	865	31.6	+15.4
Conservative	J. Hazell	784	28.6	−19.2
Majority		225	8.2	N/A
Turnout		2,739	53.2	+5.9
Registered electors		5,150		
Labour hold		Swing	▼5.3	

=== Harbour ===
Harbour
Party	Candidate	Votes	%	±%
Labour	Rod Green*	1,076	44.0	−12.1
Alliance	E. Fowler	845	34.6	+14.1
Conservative	Mike Coyne	485	19.9	−3.6
Independent	F. Baldwin	37	1.5	N/A
Majority		231	9.4	−23.2
Turnout		2,443	45.2	+5.7
Registered electors		5,470		
Labour hold		Swing	▼13.1	

=== Lexden ===
Lexden
Party	Candidate	Votes	%	±%
Alliance	W. Sandford	1,218	53.7	+4.2
Conservative	S. Lewis	921	40.6	−5.1
Labour	D. Chappell	129	5.7	+0.8
Majority		297	13.1	+9.3
Turnout		2,268	53.6	−3.6
Registered electors		4,235		
Alliance gain from Conservative		Swing	▲4.7	

=== Mile End ===
Mile End
Party	Candidate	Votes	%	±%
Conservative	J. Fulford*	797	48.1	−8.1
Alliance	W. Reid	513	31.0	+16.9
Labour	S. Dick	347	20.9	−8.5
Majority		284	17.1	−10.0
Turnout		1,657	41.7	−0.2
Registered electors		3,971		
Conservative hold		Swing	▼12.5	

=== New Town ===
New Town
Party	Candidate	Votes	%	±%
Alliance	Y. Edkins	1,100	60.4	−11.4
Labour	J. Bayles	450	24.7	+8.5
Conservative	J. Clarke	270	14.8	+2.8
Majority		650	35.7	−19.9
Turnout		1,820	39.3	−9.1
Registered electors		4,630		
Alliance hold		Swing	▼10.0	

=== Prettygate ===
Prettygate
Party	Candidate	Votes	%	±%
Alliance	David Goss	1,445	55.0	+4.0
Conservative	S. Sheffield	827	31.5	−5.2
Labour	E. Plowright	353	13.4	+1.1
Majority		618	23.5	+9.2
Turnout		2,625	51.7	+1.0
Registered electors		5,082		
Alliance gain from Conservative		Swing	▲4.6	

=== Shrub End ===
Shrub End
Party	Candidate	Votes	%	±%
Alliance	G. Daldry*	1,299	57.3	+13.4
Labour	Chris Pearson	734	32.4	−11.2
Conservative	A. Stevenson	235	10.4	−2.1
Majority		565	24.9	+24.6
Turnout		2,268	36.8	−1.4
Registered electors		6,159		
Alliance hold		Swing	▲12.3	

=== St. Andrew's ===
St. Andrew's
Party	Candidate	Votes	%	±%
Labour	Graham Bober*	1,310	59.4	−3.1
Conservative	R. Larkins	485	22.0	−2.6
Alliance	J. Meleschko	410	18.6	+5.7
Majority		825	37.4	−0.5
Turnout		2,205	25.4	−6.0
Registered electors		8,690		
Labour hold		Swing	▼0.3	

=== St. Anne's ===
St. Anne's
Party	Candidate	Votes	%	±%
Alliance	Mike Hogg	890	39.4	+22.3
Labour	K. Hindle	716	31.7	−13.7
Conservative	L. Spendlove	653	28.9	−8.7
Majority		174	7.7	N/A
Turnout		2,259	46.3	−4.0
Registered electors		4,876		
Alliance gain from Labour		Swing	▲18.0	

=== St. John's ===
St. John's
Party	Candidate	Votes	%	±%
Alliance	E. Hubbard	928	45.5	+10.3
Conservative	M. Roots*	885	43.4	−8.5
Labour	G. Rose	226	11.1	−1.8
Majority		43	2.1	N/A
Turnout		2,039	46.3	+1.6
Registered electors		4,560		
Alliance gain from Conservative		Swing	▲9.4	

=== St. Mary's ===
St. Mary's
Party	Candidate	Votes	%	±%
Conservative	Nigel Chapman*	964	47.6	−15.1
Alliance	R. Baker	603	29.8	+11.6
Labour	R. Turp	459	22.7	+3.6
Majority		361	17.8	−25.8
Turnout		2,026	40.2	−1.4
Registered electors		5,042		
Conservative hold		Swing	▼13.4	

=== Stanway ===
Vote share changes are compared to the top candidate result from the 1984 election.

Stanway
Party	Candidate	Votes	%	±%
Alliance	J. Ellis	893	44.0	+13.7
Conservative	I. Parsonson	831	40.9	−11.0
Labour	M. Fitzgibbon	306	15.1	−2.7
Majority		62	3.1	N/A
Turnout		1,724	40.7	+4.9
Registered electors		4,989		
Alliance gain from Conservative		Swing	▲12.4	

=== Tiptree ===
Tiptree
Party	Candidate	Votes	%	±%
Residents	John Elliott*	1,110	60.5	+9.2
Conservative	C. Borgartz	472	25.7	−7.7
Labour	T. Lawson	254	13.8	−1.5
Majority		638	34.8	+16.9
Turnout		1,836	30.5	−0.5
Registered electors		6,010		
Residents hold		Swing	▲8.5	

=== West Bergholt ===
West Bergholt
Party	Candidate	Votes	%	±%
Conservative	J. Lampon*	562	52.4	−10.8
Alliance	M. Cook	393	36.7	+10.8
Labour	J. Church	117	10.9	±0.0
Majority		169	15.7	−21.5
Turnout		1,072	45.9	+2.6
Registered electors		2,334		
Conservative hold		Swing	▼10.8	

=== West Mersea ===
Vote share changes are compared to the top candidate result from the 1984 election.

West Mersea
Party	Candidate	Votes	%	±%
Conservative	L. Leader*	1,183	62.0	+6.9
Alliance	A. Stevens	566	29.7	+18.5
Labour	C. Nimmo	159	8.3	+0.1
Majority		617	32.3	N/A
Turnout		1,908	37.4	−12.2
Registered electors		5,105		
Conservative hold		Swing	▼5.8	

No Independent candidate as previous (-25.5).

=== Winstree ===
Winstree
Party	Candidate	Votes	%	±%
Conservative	M. Fairhead*	685	58.5	−14.0
Alliance	A. Spear	378	32.3	+11.2
Labour	L. Shelley	108	9.2	+4.0
Majority		307	26.2	−25.2
Turnout		1,171	54.6	+0.2
Registered electors		2,146		
Conservative hold		Swing	▼12.6	

=== Wivenhoe ===
Wivenhoe (2 seats due to by-election)
Party	Candidate	Votes	%	±%
Labour	S. Sharp	1,060	42.4	−8.2
Labour	Mary Liddy	1,034	41.3	−9.3
Conservative	K. Green	943	37.7	−1.0
Conservative	M. Geddes	808	32.3	−6.4
Alliance	D. Locke	499	20.0	+9.3
Alliance	P. Smith	460	18.4	+7.7
Turnout		2,501	40.9	−0.6
Registered electors		6,116		
Labour gain from Conservative				
Labour gain from Conservative				
