= 1986 Worthing Borough Council election =

1986 English local election

- 8 May 1986

13 out of 36 seats to Worthing Borough Council 19 seats needed for a majority

	First party	Second party
Party	Conservative	Alliance
Last election	24 seats, 56.9%	12 seats, 37.7%
Seats won	6	7
Seats after	22	14
Seat change	▼2	▲2
Popular vote	14,746	13,316
Percentage	47.1%	42.6%
Swing	▼9.8%	▲4.9%
Council control before election
Conservative
Council control after election
Conservative

The 1986 Worthing Borough Council election took place on 8 May 1986 to elect members of Worthing Borough Council in West Sussex, England. This was on the same day as other local elections.

== Summary ==
=== Election result ===
1986 Worthing Borough Council election
Party	This election				Full council			This election		
Party	Candidates	Seats	Net	Seats %	Other	Total	Total %	Votes	Votes %	+/−
Conservative	{{{candidates}}}	6	▼2	46.2	16	22	61.1	14,746	47.1	–9.8
Alliance	{{{candidates}}}	7	▲2	53.8	7	14	38.9	13,316	42.6	+4.9
Labour	{{{candidates}}}	0	Steady	0.0	0	0	0.0	3,230	10.3	+4.9

== Ward results ==
=== Broadwater ===
Broadwater
Party	Candidate	Votes	%	±%
Alliance	A. Dockerty*	1,441	58.2	+8.2
Conservative	S. Kemp	819	33.1	–10.2
Labour	B. Wright	214	8.6	+1.9
Majority		622	25.1	+18.4
Turnout		2,474	37.7	–0.7
Registered electors		6,564		
Alliance hold		Swing	▲9.2	

=== Castle ===
Castle (2 seats due to by-election)
Party	Candidate	Votes	%
Alliance	V. Harvey	1,041	48.3
Alliance	L. Turner	1,018	47.2
Conservative	E. Popplestone	787	36.5
Conservative	J. Finlay	766	35.5
Labour	J. Hammond	329	15.3
Labour	T. Jones	254	11.8
Turnout		2,156	33.4
Registered electors		6,456	
Alliance hold			
Alliance hold			

=== Central ===
Central
Party	Candidate	Votes	%	±%
Alliance	R. Lipscombe	922	50.2	–1.2
Conservative	A. Macmillan*	713	38.9	–9.7
Labour	H. King	200	10.9	N/A
Majority		209	11.4	+8.6
Turnout		1,835	32.4	+3.9
Registered electors		5,668		
Alliance gain from Conservative		Swing	▲4.3	

=== Durrington ===
Durrington
Party	Candidate	Votes	%	±%
Alliance	C. Moore*	1,469	55.8	+11.0
Conservative	R. Smart	935	35.5	–13.4
Labour	J. Duggan	227	8.6	+2.3
Majority		534	20.3	N/A
Turnout		2,631	41.0	+5.4
Registered electors		6,412		
Alliance hold		Swing	▲12.2	

=== Gaisford ===
Gaisford
Party	Candidate	Votes	%	±%
Alliance	C. Golds	1,182	50.1	–3.3
Conservative	S. Wilton	903	38.3	+0.8
Labour	S. Hurcombe	274	11.6	+2.5
Majority		279	11.8	–4.1
Turnout		2,359	36.7	+3.6
Registered electors		6,431		
Alliance hold		Swing	▼2.1	

=== Goring ===
Goring
Party	Candidate	Votes	%	±%
Conservative	M. Clinch*	1,655	57.8	–22.1
Alliance	M. Clayden	1,039	36.3	+16.2
Labour	P. Taylor	171	6.0	N/A
Majority		616	21.5	–38.2
Turnout		2,865	41.7	+1.6
Registered electors		6,873		
Conservative hold		Swing	▼19.2	

=== Heene ===
Heene
Party	Candidate	Votes	%	±%
Conservative	G. Collinson*	1,521	62.6	–9.4
Alliance	S. Kift	709	29.2	+1.2
Labour	S. Deen	200	8.2	N/A
Majority		812	33.4	–10.5
Turnout		2,430	37.1	+1.6
Registered electors		6,557		
Conservative hold		Swing	▼5.3	

=== Marine ===
Marine
Party	Candidate	Votes	%	±%
Conservative	E. McDonald*	1,545	59.0	–9.2
Alliance	T. Chapman	894	34.1	+8.1
Labour	J. Deen	181	6.9	+1.0
Majority		651	24.8	–17.4
Turnout		2,620	41.3	+3.0
Registered electors		6,347		
Conservative hold		Swing	▼8.7	

=== Offington ===
Offington
Party	Candidate	Votes	%	±%
Conservative	D. Peters	1,404	61.2	–10.7
Alliance	G. Meredith	752	32.8	+11.0
Labour	D. Broad	137	6.0	–0.3
Majority		652	28.4	–21.8
Turnout		2,293	37.1	+0.3
Registered electors		6,185		
Conservative hold		Swing	▼10.9	

=== Salvington ===
Salvington
Party	Candidate	Votes	%	±%
Conservative	G. Lissenburg	1,591	58.3	–4.2
Alliance	J. Crabtree	923	33.8	+1.0
Labour	Y. Griffiths	216	7.9	+3.1
Majority		668	24.5	–5.2
Turnout		2,730	40.7	+6.1
Registered electors		6,713		
Conservative hold		Swing	▼2.6	

=== Selden ===
Selden
Party	Candidate	Votes	%	±%
Conservative	M. Wilton*	1,007	42.9	–7.1
Alliance	M. Elson	791	33.7	–5.5
Labour	B. Frost	548	23.4	+12.6
Majority		216	9.2	–1.5
Turnout		2,346	37.0	+4.7
Registered electors		6,334		
Conservative hold		Swing	▼0.8	

=== Tarring ===
Tarring
Party	Candidate	Votes	%	±%
Alliance	W. Phillips	1,135	45.1	+1.7
Conservative	E. Ilett	1,100	43.8	–4.7
Labour	S. Peaty	279	11.1	+2.9
Majority		35	1.4	–3.7
Turnout		2,514	38.3	+4.1
Registered electors		6,571		
Alliance gain from Conservative		Swing	▲3.2	
