= 1986 Welwyn Hatfield District Council election =

Welwyn Hatfield District Council election

- 8 May 1986

15 out of 43 seats to Welwyn Hatfield District Council 22 seats needed for a majority
- Turnout: ~35,150, 50.4%

	First party	Second party	Third party
Party	Labour	Conservative	Alliance
Last election	24 seats, 42.9%	19 seats, 38.2%	0 seats, 16.4%
Seats before	24	19	0
Seats after	24	17	2
Seat change	Steady	▼2	▲2
Popular vote	14,392	13,696	9,974
Percentage	37.8%	36.0%	26.2%
Swing	▼5.1	▼2.2	▲7.3
- Council composition following the election.

The 1986 Welwyn Hatfield District Council election took place on 8 May 1986 to elect members of Welwyn Hatfield District Council in England. This was on the same day as other local elections. One third of the seats were contested. While Labour maintained their control of the council, two seats in Handside Ward went to the SDP-Liberal Alliance's candidates, marking the first time any party outside of Labour and the Conservatives won a seat in one of the council's local elections.

== Summary ==
=== Election results ===
1986 Welwyn Hatfield District Council election
Party	This election			Full council			This election		
Party	Seats	Net	Seats %	Other	Total	Total %	Votes	Votes %	+/−
Labour	8	Steady	55.3	16	24	55.8	14,392	37.8	–5.1
Conservative	5	▼2	33.3	12	17	39.5	13,696	36.0	–2.2
Alliance	2	▲2	13.3	0	2	4.7	9,974	26.2	+7.3
