= 1990 Dumfries and Galloway Regional Council election =

Fifth election to Dumfries and Galloway Regional Council

← 1986	3 May 1990	1994 →

All 35 seats to Dumfries and Galloway Regional Council 18 seats needed for a majority
- Turnout: 44.5%
	First party	Second party	Third party
Party	Independent	Labour	SNP
Last election	19 seats, 45.7%	7 seats, 20.4%	5 seats, 10.9%
Seats won	18	10	4
Seat change	▼1	▲3	▼1
Popular vote	14,340	7,696	6,242
Percentage	40.7%	21.8%	17.7%
	Fourth party	Fifth party
Party	Liberal Democrats	Independent Labour
Last election	4 seats, 13.9%	Did not contest
Seats won	2	1
Seat change	▼2	▲1
Popular vote	2,815	617
Percentage	8.0%	1.8%
- The result of the election

The 1990 Dumfries and Galloway Regional Council election, the fifth election to Dumfries and Galloway Regional Council, was held on 3 May 1990 as part of the wider 1990 Scottish regional elections. The election saw the Independents' majority cut to 1 councillor, but enough to keep control of the 35 seat council.

== Results ==
1990 Dumfries and Galloway Regional Council election result
Party	Seats	Gains	Losses	Net gain/loss	Seats %	Votes %	Votes	+/−
Independent	18	2	3	▼1	51.4	40.7	13,865	▼5.0
Labour	10	4	1	▲3	28.6	21.8	7,696	▲1.4
SNP	4	3	4	▼1	11.4	17.7	6,242	▲6.8
Liberal Democrats	2	0	2	▼2	5.7	8.0	2,815	▼5.9
Independent Labour	1	1	0	▲1	2.9	1.8	617	New
Conservative	0	0	0	Steady	0.0	10.2	3,593	▲1.1

== Ward results ==
1990 Dumfries and Galloway Regional Council election
Ward		Councillor	Result
1	Cree	A. T. Nisbet	SNP gain from Independent
2	Machars	J. McColm	Independent hold
3	Moors	D. R. Robinson	Independent hold
4	Rhins South	E. C. Archibald	Independent gain from SLD
5	Rhins North	D. McHarg	Independent hold
6	Ryan	J. Brown	Independent hold
7	Stranraer	J. G. Heron	SNP gain from Independent
8	Castle Douglas	E. Fulton	Independent hold
9	Dalbeatie	M. M. Parker	Independent hold
10	Stewartry East	E. J. Smith	Independent hold
11	Stewartry North	M. Bryson	Independent hold
12	Stewartry West	J. V. M. Jameson	Independent hold
13	Kirkcudbright	W. C. Clemie	Independent hold
14	Kirkconnel	C. M. Hyslop	Independent Labour gain from Labour
15	Sanquhar/Queensferry	J. Pirrie	SNP gain from Independent
16	Mid Nithsdale	M. R. Hastings	Independent hold
17	Locharbriggs	K. W. Morton	Labour hold
18	Tinwald Downs	K. Cameron	Labour hold
19	Lochar	G. M. McMurdo	Independent gain from SNP
20	Mabie	K. A. Kelly	Independent hold
21	St Mary's	J. W. Forteath	Labour hold
22	Noblehill	B. D. Conchie	Labour gain from SNP
23	St Michael's	J. M. Dowson	Labour gain from SNP
24	Rotchell	T. A. McAughtrie	Labour hold
25	Palmerston	S. M. Howat	Labour gain from SNP
26	Lochside	T. M. A. Kelly	Labour hold
27	Maryholm	A. Hannay	Labour hold
28	Annan	R. L. Brown	Labour hold
29	Chapelcross	J. B. Wallace	Labour gain from SLD
30	Border	R. G. Greenhow	Independent hold
31	Eskdale	D. R. Male	Independent hold
32	Burnswark	A. T. Baldwick	Liberal Democrats hold
33	Upper Annandale	W. P. Farrell	SNP hold
34	West Annadale	I. A. Pennie	Independent hold
35	Mid Annandale	J. E. Turpie	Liberal Democrats hold
