= 1982 Dumfries and Galloway Regional Council election =

1982 Scottish local government election

← 1978	6 May 1982	1986 →

All 35 seats to Dumfries and Galloway Regional Council 18 seats needed for a majority
- Turnout: 39.0%
	First party	Second party	Third party
Party	Independent	Conservative	Labour
Last election	27 seats, 67.4%	5 seats, 15.7%	2 seats, 12.3%
Seats won	22	4	4
Seat change	▼5	▼1	▲2
Popular vote	16,287	4,111	1,635
Percentage	51.1%	12.9%	5.1%
Swing	▼16.3%	▼2.8%	▼7.2%
	Fourth party	Fifth party
Party	SNP	Alliance
Last election	1 seat, 3.7%	Did not contest
Seats won	3	2
Seat change	▲2	▲2
Popular vote	4,870	4,973
Percentage	15.3%	15.6%
Swing	▲11.6%	New

The third Dumfries and Galloway Regional Council election was held on 6 May 1982.

This was the first time the Liberals and the SDP contested the regional election in Dumfries and Galloway. The Conservatives remained behind to the independents, even though they lost one of their seats. Labour managed to increase their seats while their vote share declined. The Scottish National Party (SNP) had a very good election, gaining 2 seats and increasing their vote share by over 11%. This election had the most candidates seeking election, with 72 (an increase of 18 from last election.

== Results ==
1982 Dumfries and Galloway Regional Council election result
Party	Seats	Gains	Losses	Net gain/loss	Seats %	Votes %	Votes	+/−
Independent	22			▼5	62.9	51.1	16,287	▼16.3
Conservative	4			▼1	11.4	12.9	4,111	▼2.8
Labour	4			▲2	11.4	5.1	1,635	▼7.2
SNP	3			▲2	8.6	15.3	4,870	▲11.6
Alliance	2	2	0	▲2	5.7	15.6	4,973	New
