= 1986 Waveney District Council election =

1986 English local government election

- 8 May 1986

All 48 seats to Waveney District Council 25 seats needed for a majority

	First party	Second party
Party	Conservative	Labour
Seats won	8	7
Seats after	23	21
Seat change	▼3	▲2
Popular vote	9,118	10,061
Percentage	33.8%	37.3%
Swing	▼2.8%	▼8.2%
	Third party	Fourth party
Party	Alliance	Independent
Seats won	1	0
Seats after	3	1
Seat change	▲1	Steady
Popular vote	6,807	782
Percentage	25.3%	2.9%
Swing	▲10.9%	▼0.6%
- Winner of each seat at the 1986 Waveney District Council election.
Control before election
Conservative
Control after election
No overall control

The 1986 Waveney District Council election took place on 8 May 1986 to elect members of Waveney District Council in Suffolk, England. This was on the same day as other local elections.

== Summary ==
=== Election result ===
1986 Waveney District Council election
Party	This election			Full council			This election		
Party	Seats	Net	Seats %	Other	Total	Total %	Votes	Votes %	+/−
Conservative	8	▼3	50.0	15	23	47.9	9,118	33.8	–2.8
Labour	7	▲2	43.8	14	21	43.8	10,061	37.3	–8.2
Alliance	1	▲1	6.3	2	3	6.3	6,807	25.3	+10.9
Independent	0	Steady	0.0	1	1	2.1	782	2.9	–0.6
Residents	0	Steady	0.0	0	0	0.0	171	0.6	N/A

== Ward results ==
Incumbent councillors standing for re-election are marked with an asterisk (*). Changes in seats do not take into account by-elections or defections.

=== Beccles Town ===
Beccles Town
Party	Candidate	Votes	%	±%
Conservative	D. Hartley*	789	33.5	
Alliance	E. Crisp	751	31.9	
Labour	H. Ley	635	27.0	
Independent	L. Watling	177	7.5	
Majority		38	1.6	
Turnout		2,352	43.1	
Registered electors		5,452		
Conservative hold				

=== Carlton ===
Carlton
Party	Candidate	Votes	%	±%
Conservative	J. Scarles	673	35.5	
Alliance	C. Shade	640	33.8	
Labour	Y. Phipp	412	21.7	
Residents	R. Allen	171	9.0	
Majority		33	1.7	
Turnout		1,896	34.7	
Registered electors		5,457		
Conservative hold				

=== Gunton ===
Gunton
Party	Candidate	Votes	%	±%
Alliance	A. Chamberlain	1,125	45.4	
Conservative	N. Brighouse*	899	36.3	
Labour	G. Strachan	456	18.4	
Majority		226	9.1	
Turnout		2,480	47.8	
Registered electors		5,186		
Alliance gain from Conservative				

=== Harbour ===
Harbour
Party	Candidate	Votes	%	±%
Labour	R. Ford*	680	58.5	
Alliance	A. Sheperd	482	41.5	
Majority		198	17.0	
Turnout		1,162	29.0	
Registered electors		4,007		
Labour hold				

=== Kessingland ===
Kessingland
Party	Candidate	Votes	%	±%
Conservative	B. Reader*	680	46.5	
Labour	R. Jones	609	41.7	
Alliance	R. Jenner	173	11.8	
Majority		71	4.9	
Turnout		1,462	42.1	
Registered electors		3,476		
Conservative hold				

=== Kirkley ===
Kirkley
Party	Candidate	Votes	%	±%
Labour	S. Graham	774	44.5	
Conservative	P. Harvey	490	28.2	
Alliance	J. Van Pelt	474	27.3	
Majority		284	16.3	
Turnout		1,740	38.7	
Registered electors		4,494		
Labour hold				

=== Lothingland ===
Lothingland
Party	Candidate	Votes	%	±%
Labour	R. Breach	660	38.5	
Conservative	A. Brown	631	36.8	
Alliance	A. Moles	423	24.7	
Majority		29	1.7	
Turnout		1,712	41.7	
Registered electors		4,107		
Labour hold				

=== Mutford ===
Mutford
Party	Candidate	Votes	%	±%
Conservative	S. Taylor	259	46.4	
Alliance	A. Jonsberg	165	29.6	
Labour	J. Spottiswoode	134	24.0	
Majority		94	16.8	
Turnout		558	43.3	
Registered electors		1,290		
Conservative hold				

=== Normanston ===
Normanston
Party	Candidate	Votes	%	±%
Labour	B. Hunter*	1,106	62.5	
Conservative	D. Collins	362	20.5	
Alliance	V. Caseley	301	17.0	
Majority		744	42.1	
Turnout		1,768	38.0	
Registered electors		4,653		
Labour hold				

=== Oulton Broad ===
Oulton Broad
Party	Candidate	Votes	%	±%
Conservative	A. Choveaux*	1,028	45.3	
Labour	R. Jack	792	34.9	
Alliance	D. Tregloyne	450	19.8	
Majority		236	10.4	
Turnout		2,267	44.1	
Registered electors		5,142		
Conservative hold				

=== Pakefield ===
Pakefield
Party	Candidate	Votes	%	±%
Labour	A. Skipper	1,090	49.8	
Conservative	M. Gallidoro*	787	35.9	
Alliance	G. Carroll	313	14.3	
Majority		303	13.8	
Turnout		2,190	40.7	
Registered electors		5,385		
Labour gain from Conservative				

=== South Elmham ===
South Elmham
Party	Candidate	Votes	%	±%
Conservative	M. Rose*	424	53.1	
Alliance	M. Brighton	290	36.3	
Labour	G. Dix	84	10.5	
Majority		134	16.8	
Turnout		798	57.2	
Registered electors		1,395		
Conservative hold				

=== Southwold ===
Southwold
Party	Candidate	Votes	%	±%
Conservative	E. Wilkin	1,167	53.6	
Independent	S. White	605	27.8	
Alliance	R. Winyard	407	18.7	
Majority		562	25.8	
Turnout		2,179	42.9	
Registered electors		5,080		
Conservative hold				

=== St. Margarets ===
St. Margarets
Party	Candidate	Votes	%	±%
Labour	A. Taylor	1,109	54.6	
Alliance	W. Robertson	466	23.0	
Conservative	H. Boyd	455	22.4	
Majority		643	31.7	
Turnout		2,031	37.2	
Registered electors		5,459		
Labour hold				

=== Wainford ===
Wainford
Party	Candidate	Votes	%	±%
Conservative	E. Torlot	245	46.8	
Alliance	G. West	142	27.1	
Labour	M. Rodgers	137	26.1	
Majority		103	19.7	
Turnout		524	43.3	
Registered electors		1,209		
Conservative hold				

=== Whitton ===
Whitton
Party	Candidate	Votes	%	±%
Labour	H. Lay*	1,383	76.1	
Conservative	F. Seabridge	229	12.6	
Alliance	P. Martin	205	11.3	
Majority		1,154	63.5	
Turnout		1,817	40.9	
Registered electors		4,443		
Labour hold				
