= 1986 Rochford District Council election =

1986 English local election

- 8 May 1986

14 out of 40 seats to Rochford District Council 21 seats needed for a majority

	First party	Second party	Third party
Party	Conservative	Alliance	Labour
Seats won	5	5	3
Seats after	22	11	3
Seat change	▼5	▲3	▲1
Popular vote	6,518	6,145	3,409
Percentage	39.2%	37.0%	20.5%
Swing	▼11.3%	▲7.9%	▲2.1%
	Fourth party	Fifth party
Party	Independent	Residents
Seats won	1	0
Seats after	3	1
Seat change	▲1	Steady
Popular vote	499	did not stand
Percentage	3.0%	did not stand
Swing	▲1.0%	N/A
Council control before election
Conservative
Council control after election
Conservative

The 1986 Rochford District Council election took place on 8 May 1986 to elect members of Rochford District Council in Essex, England. This was on the same day as other local elections.

== Summary ==
=== Election result ===
1986 Rochford District Council election
Party	This election			Full council			This election		
Party	Seats	Net	Seats %	Other	Total	Total %	Votes	Votes %	+/−
Conservative	5	▼5	35.7	17	22	55.0	6,518	39.2	–11.3
Alliance	5	▲3	35.7	6	11	27.5	6,145	37.0	+7.9
Labour	3	▲1	21.4	0	3	7.5	3,409	20.5	+2.1
Independent	1	▲1	7.1	2	3	7.5	499	3.0	+1.0
Residents	0	Steady	0.0	1	1	2.5	N/A	N/A	N/A
Ratepayer	0	Steady	0.0	0	0	0.0	42	0.3	N/A

== Ward results ==
Incumbent councillors standing for re-election are marked with an asterisk (*).

=== Downhall ===
Downhall
Party	Candidate	Votes	%	±%
Alliance	S. Lemon	765	69.4	+13.4
Conservative	T. Murray	337	30.6	–13.4
Majority		428	38.8	+26.8
Turnout		1,102	41.5	–2.9
Registered electors		2,655		
Alliance gain from Conservative		Swing	▲13.4	

=== Grange & Rawreth ===
Grange & Rawreth
Party	Candidate	Votes	%	±%
Alliance	S. Skinner	697	44.9	+7.6
Conservative	D. Geach	487	31.4	–1.8
Labour	S. Cox	367	23.7	–5.8
Majority		210	13.5	+9.5
Turnout		1,551	35.2	+0.3
Registered electors		4,407		
Alliance gain from Conservative		Swing	▲4.7	

=== Hawkwell East ===
Hawkwell East
Party	Candidate	Votes	%	±%
Conservative	J. Sheaf*	801	48.5	–21.1
Alliance	M. Stevens	464	28.1	N/A
Labour	S. Leftley	386	23.4	–7.0
Majority		337	20.4	–18.8
Turnout		1,651	33.0	+4.7
Registered electors		5,009		
Conservative hold				

=== Hockley East ===
Hockley East
Party	Candidate	Votes	%	±%
Conservative	C. Faherty	645	64.3	+6.7
Labour	J. Christie	358	35.7	N/A
Majority		287	28.6	N/A
Turnout		1,003	31.3	–11.9
Registered electors		3,200		
Conservative hold				

=== Hullbridge Riverside ===
Hullbridge Riverside
Party	Candidate	Votes	%	±%
Labour	D. Flack	529	45.6	+9.6
Conservative	E. Letch	423	36.5	–0.4
Alliance	M. Menning	207	17.9	–9.2
Majority		106	9.1	N/A
Turnout		1,159	37.5	+4.7
Registered electors		3,091		
Labour gain from Alliance		Swing	▲5.0	

=== Hullbridge South ===
Hullbridge South
Party	Candidate	Votes	%	±%
Conservative	R. Brown	413	52.1	+15.1
Labour	A. Malcolm	379	47.9	+13.6
Majority		34	4.3	+1.5
Turnout		792	33.6	–1.4
Registered electors		2,360		
Conservative hold		Swing	▲0.8	

=== Lodge ===
Lodge
Party	Candidate	Votes	%	±%
Alliance	M. Handford	919	49.1	+8.4
Conservative	J. Murison*	759	40.5	–8.3
Labour	J. Foley	194	10.4	–0.1
Majority		160	8.5	N/A
Turnout		1,872	40.1	+5.0
Registered electors		4,665		
Alliance gain from Conservative		Swing	▲8.4	

=== Rayleigh Central ===
Rayleigh Central
Party	Candidate	Votes	%	±%
Independent	S. Silva	499	43.1	+8.7
Conservative	R. Foster*	344	29.7	–10.0
Alliance	N. Harris	316	27.3	+11.3
Majority		155	13.4	N/A
Turnout		1,159	39.9	+5.9
Registered electors		2,904		
Independent gain from Conservative		Swing	▲9.4	

=== Rochford Eastwood ===
Rochford Eastwood
Party	Candidate	Votes	%	±%
Conservative	W. Budge*	233	32.6	–21.8
Labour	G. Tasker	231	32.4	N/A
Alliance	P. Saunders	208	29.1	–16.5
Ratepayer	G. Skinner	42	5.9	N/A
Majority		2	0.3	–8.6
Turnout		714	52.6	+5.6
Registered electors		1,358		
Conservative hold				

=== Rochford Roche ===
Rochford Roche
Party	Candidate	Votes	%	±%
Labour	C. Stephenson*	408	53.5	+2.3
Conservative	D. Eade	230	30.1	–4.9
Alliance	J. Haslam	125	16.4	+2.6
Majority		178	23.3	+7.1
Turnout		763	50.3	–4.7
Registered electors		2,462		
Labour hold		Swing	▲3.6	

=== Rochford St Andrews ===
Rochford St Andrews
Party	Candidate	Votes	%	±%
Labour	D. Weir*	453	37.6	–12.3
Conservative	P. Easter	443	36.8	–13.3
Alliance	B. Cummings	309	25.6	N/A
Majority		10	0.8	N/A
Turnout		1,205	48.9	+1.7
Registered electors		2,462		
Labour hold		Swing	▲0.5	

=== Trinity ===
Trinity
Party	Candidate	Votes	%	±%
Alliance	R. Boyd*	937	71.6	+11.7
Conservative	S. Easter	371	28.4	–11.7
Majority		566	43.3	+23.6
Turnout		1,308	45.6	–2.5
Registered electors		2,868		
Alliance hold		Swing	▲11.7	

=== Wheatley ===
Wheatley
Party	Candidate	Votes	%	±%
Conservative	B. Lovett*	538	47.9	+1.5
Alliance	J. Gordonn	482	42.9	–10.7
Labour	G. Plackett	104	9.3	N/A
Majority		56	5.0	N/A
Turnout		1,124	45.5	–1.1
Registered electors		2,469		
Conservative hold		Swing	▲6.1	

=== Whitehouse ===
Whitehouse
Party	Candidate	Votes	%	±%
Alliance	M. Hunnable	716	59.2	+24.0
Conservative	D. Fowler	494	40.8	–12.0
Majority		222	18.3	N/A
Turnout		1,210	46.3	+0.6
Registered electors		2,614		
Alliance gain from Conservative		Swing	▲18.0	
