= 1978 Dumfries and Galloway Regional Council election =

Local election in Scotland

← 1974	2 May 1978	1982 →

All 35 seats to Dumfries and Galloway Regional Council 18 seats needed for a majority
- Turnout: 43.3%
	First party	Second party
Party	Independent	Conservative
Last election	33 seats, 81.7%	Did not contest
Seats won	27	5
Seat change	▼6	▲5
Popular vote	13,087	3,050
Percentage	67.4%	15.7%
Swing	▼14.3%	New
	Third party	Fourth party
Party	Labour	SNP
Last election	2 seats, 11.2%	0 seats, 1.2%
Seats won	2	1
Seat change	Steady	▲1
Popular vote	2,382	711
Percentage	12.3%	3.7%
Swing	▲1.1%	▲2.5%

The second Dumfries and Galloway regional council election was held on 2 May 1978, a year after the second district council elections.

Turnout was down. Only 15 of the 35 wards in the region were contested.

== Results ==
1978 Dumfries and Galloway Regional Council election result
Party	Seats	Gains	Losses	Net gain/loss	Seats %	Votes %	Votes	+/−
Independent	27			▼6	77.1	67.4	13,087	▼14.3
Conservative	5	5	0	▲5	14.3	15.7	3,050	New
Labour	2			Steady	5.7	12.3	2,382	▲1.1
SNP	1			▲1	2.9	3.7	711	▲2.5
Independent Labour	0	0	0	Steady	0.0	0.9	183	New
