= 1986 Hertsmere Borough Council election =

Local election in England

- 8 May 1986

13 out of 39 seats to Hertsmere Borough Council 20 seats needed for a majority
- Registered: 45,464
- Turnout: 48.5% (▲6.5%)

	First party	Second party	Third party
Party	Conservative	Labour	Alliance
Seats won	8	2	3
Seats after	22	12	5
Seat change	▼1	Steady	▲1
Popular vote	10,151	4,669	7,215
Percentage	46.1%	21.2%	32.7%
Swing	▼6.5%	▼1.8%	▲8.3%
- Winner of each seat at the 1986 Hertsmere Borough Council election. Wards in white were not contested.
Control before election
Conservative
Control after election
Conservative

The 1986 Hertsmere Borough Council election took place on 8 May 1986 to elect members of Hertsmere Borough Council in Hertfordshire, England. This was on the same day as other local elections.

== Summary ==
=== Election result ===
1986 Hertsmere Borough Council election
Party	This election				Full council			This election		
Party	Candidates	Seats	Net	Seats %	Other	Total	Total %	Votes	Votes %	+/−
Conservative	{{{candidates}}}	8	▼1	61.5	14	22	56.4	10,151	46.1	–6.5
Labour	{{{candidates}}}	2	Steady	23.1	10	12	30.8	4,669	21.2	–1.8
Alliance	{{{candidates}}}	3	▲1	15.4	2	5	12.8	7,215	32.7	+8.3

== Ward results ==
Incumbent councillors standing for re-election are marked with an asterisk (*). Changes in seats do not take into account by-elections or defections.

=== Aldenham East ===
Aldenham East
Party	Candidate	Votes	%	±%
Conservative	A. Gattward	1,217	62.7	–15.5
Alliance	A. Burke	533	27.5	+11.9
Labour	A. Page	190	9.8	+3.6
Majority		684	35.2	–27.4
Turnout		1,940	55.3	+5.0
Registered electors		3,508		
Conservative hold		Swing	▼13.7	

=== Brookmeadow ===
Brookmeadow
Party	Candidate	Votes	%	±%
Labour	P. Roach*	998	74.8	+6.6
Conservative	N. Gorman	199	14.9	–3.2
Alliance	J. Reefe	137	10.3	–3.4
Majority		799	59.9	+9.8
Turnout		1,334	44.0	+0.5
Registered electors		3,032		
Labour hold		Swing	▲4.9	

=== Elstree ===
Elstree
Party	Candidate	Votes	%	±%
Conservative	C. Watts*	1,062	57.6	–12.0
Alliance	T. Palmer	474	25.7	+10.9
Labour	L. Selhi	307	16.7	+1.2
Majority		588	31.9	–22.2
Turnout		1,843	46.0	–1.2
Registered electors		4,007		
Conservative hold		Swing	▼11.5	

=== Heath North ===
Heath North
Party	Candidate	Votes	%	±%
Conservative	J. Harding*	885	49.4	–8.0
Alliance	L. Reefe	718	40.0	+5.8
Labour	E. Kelly	190	10.6	+2.2
Majority		167	9.4	–13.8
Turnout		1,793	47.7	+6.1
Registered electors		3,759		
Conservative hold		Swing	▼6.9	

=== Heath South ===
Heath South
Party	Candidate	Votes	%	±%
Conservative	R. Gealy	947	61.4	–2.3
Alliance	R. Martins	453	29.4	–0.3
Labour	H. Bearfield	142	9.2	+2.6
Majority		494	32.0	–2.0
Turnout		1,542	41.3	–0.1
Registered electors		3,734		
Conservative hold		Swing	▼1.0	

=== Kenilworth ===
Kenilworth
Party	Candidate	Votes	%	±%
Labour	A. Walton	856	58.7	+16.6
Conservative	A. Rozansky	313	21.5	–7.3
Alliance	J. Timson	290	19.9	–9.2
Majority		543	37.2	+24.2
Turnout		1,459	47.2	–2.6
Registered electors		3,091		
Labour hold		Swing	▲12.0	

=== Mill ===
Mill
Party	Candidate	Votes	%	±%
Alliance	C. Mallach	983	57.8	–10.4
Conservative	J. Stainton	456	26.8	+4.2
Labour	D. Hoeksma	263	15.5	+6.4
Majority		527	31.0	–14.6
Turnout		1,702	49.2	–13.2
Registered electors		3,459		
Alliance hold		Swing	▼7.3	

=== Potters Bar Central ===
Potters Bar Central
Party	Candidate	Votes	%	±%
Conservative	I. Fielding*	738	45.7	–2.3
Alliance	D. Martin	558	34.6	–5.6
Labour	P. Matthews	318	19.7	+7.9
Majority		180	11.1	+3.3
Turnout		1,614	51.5	+5.9
Registered electors		3,134		
Conservative hold		Swing	▲1.7	

=== Potters Bar East ===
Potters Bar East
Party	Candidate	Votes	%	±%
Conservative	H. Spratt	1,063	51.6	–2.4
Alliance	O. Dow	504	24.5	+4.1
Labour	H. Caylor	492	23.9	–1.7
Majority		559	27.1	N/A
Turnout		2,059	43.3	+1.6
Registered electors		4,755		
Conservative hold		Swing	▼3.3	

=== Potters Bar North ===
Potters Bar North
Party	Candidate	Votes	%	±%
Conservative	M. Byrne	1,085	66.0	–6.9
Alliance	N. Frostick	427	26.0	+5.3
Labour	N. Bradbury	133	8.1	+1.7
Majority		658	40.0	–12.2
Turnout		1,645	45.3	+6.9
Registered electors		3,631		
Conservative hold		Swing	▼6.1	

=== Potters Bar South ===
Potters Bar South
Party	Candidate	Votes	%	±%
Conservative	E. Daniell*	746	54.5	–8.4
Labour	P. Bradbury	322	23.5	+6.1
Alliance	S. Hughes	302	22.0	+2.2
Majority		424	30.9	–12.2
Turnout		1,370	50.0	+8.4
Registered electors		2,740		
Conservative hold		Swing	▼7.3	

=== St. James East ===
St. James East
Party	Candidate	Votes	%	±%
Alliance	E. Gadsden	845	53.1	+8.2
Conservative	J. McKenzie	467	29.3	–8.2
Labour	D. Bearfield	280	17.6	±0.0
Majority		378	23.8	+16.4
Turnout		1,592	51.3	–3.8
Registered electors		3,103		
Alliance hold		Swing	▲8.2	

=== St. James West ===
St. James West
Party	Candidate	Votes	%	±%
Alliance	M. Colne	991	46.3	+4.2
Conservative	L. Silver*	973	45.4	–5.8
Labour	P. Halsey	178	8.3	+1.5
Majority		18	0.9	N/A
Turnout		2,142	61.0	+2.8
Registered electors		3,511		
Alliance gain from Conservative		Swing	▲5.0	
