= 1986 Leicester City Council election =

1986 English local election

An election took place on 8 May 1986 to elect members of Leicester City Council in England. This was on the same day as other local elections.

== Summary ==
1986 Leicester City Council election
| Party | This election | | | Full council | | | This election | | |
| Party | Seats | Net | Seats % | Other | Total | Total % | Votes | Votes % | +/− |
|---|---|---|---|---|---|---|---|---|---|
| Labour | 13 | ▼3 | 68.4 | 26 | 39 | 69.6 | 27,076 | 43.4 | –12.5 |
| Conservative | 5 | ▲2 | 26.3 | 11 | 16 | 28.6 | 21,259 | 34.1 | –2.4 |
| Alliance | 1 | ▲1 | 5.3 | 0 | 1 | 1.8 | 13,369 | 21.4 | +14.6 |
| Green | 0 | Steady | 0.0 | 0 | 0 | 0.0 | 653 | 1.0 | +0.6 |
