= 1986 North Bedfordshire Borough Council election =

1986 UK local government election

The 1986 North Bedfordshire Borough Council election took place on 8 May 1986 to elect members of North Bedfordshire Borough Council in England. This was on the same day as other local elections.

== Summary ==
=== Election result ===
1986 North Bedfordshire Borough Council election
| Party | This election | | | Full council | | | This election | | |
| Party | Seats | Net | Seats % | Other | Total | Total % | Votes | Votes % | +/− |
|---|---|---|---|---|---|---|---|---|---|
| Conservative | 6 | ▼8 | 31.6 | 17 | 23 | 43.4 | 11,791 | 33.8 | –3.1 |
| Alliance | 7 | ▲5 | 36.8 | 8 | 15 | 28.3 | 11,459 | 32.9 | +12.2 |
| Labour | 6 | ▲3 | 31.6 | 8 | 14 | 26.4 | 11,556 | 33.2 | +2.5 |
| Independent | 0 | Steady | 0.0 | 1 | 1 | 1.9 | N/A | N/A | –3.4 |
| Communist | 0 | Steady | 0.0 | 0 | 0 | 0.0 | 52 | 0.1 | –0.1 |

== Ward results ==
=== Brickhill ===
Brickhill
| Party | Candidate | Votes | % | ±% |
|---|---|---|---|---|
| Alliance | C. Green | 1,468 | 50.1 | +18.1 |
| Alliance | T. Hill | 1,419 | 48.4 | +19.5 |
| Conservative | R. Gwynne Jones* | 1,080 | 36.9 | −12.4 |
| Conservative | M. Humphrys | 985 | 33.6 | −13.9 |
| Labour | S. Gordge | 382 | 13.0 | −1.5 |
| Labour | H. Mitchell | 362 | 12.4 | −1.0 |
| Turnout | | 2,930 | 48.4 | |
| Alliance gain from Conservative | | Swing | | |
| Alliance gain from Conservative | | Swing | | |

=== Castle ===
Castle
| Party | Candidate | Votes | % | ±% |
|---|---|---|---|---|
| Conservative | R. Rigby* | 898 | 43.0 | −0.2 |
| Labour | C. Colins | 855 | 39.8 | +10.3 |
| Alliance | N. Hills | 317 | 17.3 | −6.1 |
| Turnout | | 2,070 | 52.6 | |
| Conservative hold | | Swing | | |

=== Cauldwell ===
Cauldwell
| Party | Candidate | Votes | % | ±% |
|---|---|---|---|---|
| Labour | V. Storrow* | 1,360 | 56.8 | −4.2 |
| Conservative | R. Pal | 672 | 28.1 | +7.5 |
| Alliance | M. Sawyer | 310 | 12.9 | ±0.0 |
| Communist | P. Waite | 52 | 2.2 | +0.1 |
| Turnout | | 2,394 | 42.3 | |
| Labour hold | | Swing | | |

=== De Parys ===
De Parys
| Party | Candidate | Votes | % | ±% |
|---|---|---|---|---|
| Alliance | M. Fitzpatrick | 1,300 | 48.7 | +22.2 |
| Conservative | D. Lennox-Lamb* | 922 | 34.5 | −21.1 |
| Labour | D. Lee | 448 | 16.8 | +0.3 |
| Turnout | | 2,670 | 47.8 | |
| Alliance gain from Conservative | | Swing | | |

=== Felmersham ===
Felmersham
| Party | Candidate | Votes | % | ±% |
|---|---|---|---|---|
| Conservative | P. Groves | 482 | 48.5 | −15.7 |
| Alliance | A. Nicholson | 434 | 43.7 | +31.0 |
| Labour | J. Yoell | 77 | 7.8 | −2.8 |
| Turnout | | 993 | 56.3 | |
| Conservative hold | | Swing | | |

=== Goldington ===
Goldington
| Party | Candidate | Votes | % | ±% |
|---|---|---|---|---|
| Alliance | S. Marsh* | 1,218 | 45.0 | −1.2 |
| Labour | D. Grugeon | 1,157 | 42.7 | +11.9 |
| Conservative | V. Fulford | 334 | 12.3 | −8.9 |
| Turnout | | 2,709 | 48.6 | |
| Alliance hold | | Swing | | |

=== Harpur ===
Harpur
| Party | Candidate | Votes | % | ±% |
|---|---|---|---|---|
| Labour | B. Anderson | 1,177 | 51.5 | +23.8 |
| Conservative | C. Ellis | 851 | 37.3 | −13.8 |
| Alliance | J. Lotan | 256 | 11.2 | +0.5 |
| Turnout | | 2,284 | 44.3 | |
| Labour gain from Conservative | | Swing | | |

=== Harrold ===
Harrold
| Party | Candidate | Votes | % | ±% |
|---|---|---|---|---|
| Conservative | E. Cameron | 538 | 49.4 | −4.4 |
| Alliance | N. Treverton | 301 | 27.7 | −2.0 |
| Labour | E. Falkner | 249 | 22.9 | +6.4 |
| Turnout | | 1,088 | 52.0 | |
| Conservative hold | | Swing | | |

=== Kempston East ===
Kempston East
| Party | Candidate | Votes | % | ±% |
|---|---|---|---|---|
| Labour | R. Oliver | 1,290 | 45.7 | +10.8 |
| Conservative | C. Attenborough* | 1,178 | 41.7 | −4.7 |
| Alliance | J. Ceiriog-Jones | 355 | 12.6 | +2.8 |
| Turnout | | 2,823 | 43.6 | |
| Labour gain from Conservative | | Swing | | |

=== Kempston West ===
Kempston West
| Party | Candidate | Votes | % | ±% |
|---|---|---|---|---|
| Labour | S. Hunt | 1,209 | 51.4 | +15.8 |
| Conservative | R. Hyde* | 833 | 35.4 | −5.4 |
| Alliance | K. Culbert | 312 | 13.3 | −1.6 |
| Turnout | | 2,354 | 42.9 | |
| Labour gain from Conservative | | Swing | | |

=== Kingsbrook ===
Kingsbrook
| Party | Candidate | Votes | % | ±% |
|---|---|---|---|---|
| Labour | E. Luder | 1,307 | 61.7 | +20.0 |
| Alliance | M. Whiteford | 468 | 22.1 | −3.4 |
| Conservative | P. Phillips | 343 | 16.2 | −3.3 |
| Turnout | | 2,118 | 39.0 | |
| Labour hold | | Swing | | |

=== Newnham ===
Newnham
| Party | Candidate | Votes | % | ±% |
|---|---|---|---|---|
| Alliance | M. Evans | 866 | 44.3 | +5.4 |
| Conservative | R. Norbury | 650 | 33.3 | −8.0 |
| Labour | R. Crane | 437 | 22.4 | +3.2 |
| Turnout | | 1,953 | 50.4 | |
| Alliance gain from Conservative | | Swing | | |

=== Oakley ===
Oakley
| Party | Candidate | Votes | % | ±% |
|---|---|---|---|---|
| Alliance | P. Olney | 490 | 49.4 | +19.9 |
| Conservative | E. Gough* | 431 | 43.4 | −13.8 |
| Labour | T. Carroll | 71 | 7.2 | −6.1 |
| Turnout | | 992 | 59.0 | |
| Alliance gain from Conservative | | Swing | | |

=== Putnoe ===
Putnoe
| Party | Candidate | Votes | % | ±% |
|---|---|---|---|---|
| Alliance | J. Marsh | 1,458 | 53.7 | +9.5 |
| Conservative | K. Arger | 1,023 | 37.7 | −5.1 |
| Labour | H. Wrack | 234 | 8.6 | +0.8 |
| Turnout | | 2,715 | 48.8 | |
| Alliance hold | | Swing | | |

=== Queen's Park ===
Queen's Park
| Party | Candidate | Votes | % | ±% |
|---|---|---|---|---|
| Labour | D. Jones* | 1,505 | 71.5 | +14.9 |
| Conservative | M. Williams | 373 | 17.7 | −11.4 |
| Alliance | J. Cunningham | 226 | 10.7 | +4.0 |
| Turnout | | 2,104 | 39.6 | |
| Labour hold | | Swing | | |

=== Renhold ===
Renhold
| Party | Candidate | Votes | % | ±% |
|---|---|---|---|---|
| Conservative | H. Bone* | 513 | 63.1 | −9.7 |
| Alliance | J. Codd | 200 | 24.6 | +8.1 |
| Labour | Y. Anderson | 100 | 12.3 | +1.6 |
| Turnout | | 813 | 45.5 | |
| Conservative hold | | Swing | | |

=== Riseley ===
Riseley
| Party | Candidate | Votes | % | ±% |
|---|---|---|---|---|
| Conservative | S. Cocksedge* | 669 | 66.3 | −10.0 |
| Labour | J. Jarman | 186 | 18.4 | +6.9 |
| Alliance | A. Brown | 154 | 15.3 | +3.1 |
| Turnout | | 1,009 | 49.8 | |
| Conservative hold | | Swing | | |

=== Wilshamstead ===
Wilshamstead (1)
| Party | Candidate | Votes | % | ±% |
|---|---|---|---|---|
| Conservative | V. Wisson* | 579 | 55.2 | −18.5 |
| Labour | C. Sayer | 291 | 27.8 | +10.8 |
| Alliance | A. Sewell | 178 | 17.0 | +7.7 |
| Turnout | | 1,048 | 45.4 | |
| Conservative hold | | Swing | | |
