= 1986 St Albans City and District Council election =

1986 English local election

The 1986 St Albans City and District Council election took place on 8 May 1986 to elect members of St Albans City and District Council in England. This was on the same day as other local elections.

At the election, the SDP-Liberal Alliance displaced the Conservatives as the largest party for the first time since the council's creation in 1973.

== Summary ==
1986 St Albans City and District Council election
Party	This election			Full council			This election		
Party	Seats	Net	Seats %	Other	Total	Total %	Votes	Votes %	+/−
Alliance	11	▲2	55.0	14	25	43.9	19,743	39.4	–1.9
Conservative	6	▼2	30.0	17	23	40.4	18,776	37.5	–3.7
Labour	3	▲1	15.0	5	8	14.0	9,620	19.2	+3.7
Independent	0	▼1	0.0	1	1	1.8	1,067	2.1	+0.4
Independent Labour	0	Steady	0.0	0	0	0.0	553	1.1	N/A
Green	0	Steady	0.0	0	0	0.0	300	0.6	+0.4

== Ward results ==
=== Ashley ===
Ashley
Party	Candidate	Votes	%	±%
Alliance	T. Allison	1,157	48.5	–9.8
Conservative	S. Capper	722	30.3	+2.8
Labour	C. Leet	507	21.2	+7.0
Majority		435	18.2	N/A
Turnout		2,386	49.0	–7.4
Registered electors		4,869		
Alliance hold		Swing	▼6.3	

=== Batchwood ===
Batchwood (2 seats due to by-election)
Party	Candidate	Votes	%
Labour	D. McManus	955	38.1
Alliance	R. Biddle	939	37.5
Labour	R. Mills	930	37.1
Alliance	J. Haggerty	873	34.8
Conservative	G. Barnes	613	24.5
Conservative	A. Smith	545	21.7
Turnout		2,507	49.0
Registered electors		5,116	
Labour gain from Alliance			
Alliance hold			

=== Clarence ===
Clarence
Party	Candidate	Votes	%	±%
Alliance	S. Burton	1,237	47.9	+8.0
Conservative	J. Telfer	925	35.8	–10.4
Labour	S. Seelig	421	16.3	+2.4
Majority		312	12.1	N/A
Turnout		2,583	59.0	+0.7
Registered electors		4,378		
Alliance hold		Swing	▲9.2	

=== Colney Heath ===
Colney Heath
Party	Candidate	Votes	%	±%
Alliance	B. Howard*	868	59.8	–2.3
Conservative	R. Wakeley	369	25.4	–5.3
Labour	D. Landman	215	14.8	+7.6
Majority		499	34.4	+3.1
Turnout		1,452	52.0	+0.4
Registered electors		2,792		
Alliance hold		Swing	▲1.5	

=== Cunningham ===
Cunningham
Party	Candidate	Votes	%	±%
Alliance	C. Gunner*	1,052	46.9	–12.2
Conservative	C. Ellis	739	33.0	+5.6
Labour	T. Jones	451	20.1	+6.6
Majority		313	14.0	–17.8
Turnout		2,242	47.0	–5.3
Registered electors		4,770		
Alliance hold		Swing	▼8.9	

=== Harpenden East ===
Harpenden East
Party	Candidate	Votes	%	±%
Alliance	P. Burrows	1,283	44.1	–1.4
Conservative	B. Bartman*	1,214	41.7	–3.7
Labour	D. Crew	286	9.8	+0.7
Green	J. Bishop	128	4.4	N/A
Majority		69	2.4	+2.3
Turnout		2,911	57.0	+4.7
Registered electors		5,107		
Alliance gain from Conservative		Swing	▲1.2	

=== Harpenden North ===
Harpenden North
Party	Candidate	Votes	%	±%
Conservative	K. Haywood*	1,380	47.0	–5.0
Alliance	D. Wright	1,066	36.3	+4.0
Labour	B. Saffery	317	10.8	–0.4
Green	H. Swailes	172	5.9	+1.3
Majority		314	10.7	–9.0
Turnout		2,935	51.0	+8.4
Registered electors		5,755		
Conservative hold		Swing	▼4.5	

=== Harpenden South ===
Harpenden South
Party	Candidate	Votes	%	±%
Conservative	K. McCaw*	1,434	56.7	–10.0
Alliance	L. Johnstone	874	34.6	+11.6
Labour	J. Bailey	220	8.7	+1.2
Majority		560	22.2	–21.5
Turnout		2,528	49.0	+6.8
Registered electors		5,159		
Conservative hold		Swing	▼10.8	

=== Harpenden West ===
Harpenden West
Party	Candidate	Votes	%	±%
Conservative	J. Roberts	1,461	54.8	–3.9
Alliance	D. Groom	982	36.8	+3.1
Labour	L. Fryd	225	8.4	+0.9
Majority		479	18.0	–7.0
Turnout		2,668	51.0	+2.7
Registered electors		5,231		
Conservative hold		Swing	▼3.5	

=== London Colney ===
London Colney
Party	Candidate	Votes	%	±%
Labour	R. Ranstead	1,016	41.9	–18.3
Conservative	T. Rodell	694	28.6	–11.2
Independent Labour	F. Perham*	553	22.8	N/A
Independent	I. Holt	161	6.6	N/A
Majority		322	13.3	–7.1
Turnout		2,424	43.0	+8.6
Registered electors		5,637		
Labour hold		Swing	▼3.6	

=== Marshallwick North ===
Marshallwick North
Party	Candidate	Votes	%	±%
Alliance	G. Churchard*	1,337	49.5	+0.2
Conservative	L. Caims	1,095	40.6	–1.1
Labour	C. Pearce	268	9.9	+0.8
Majority		242	9.0	+1.4
Turnout		2,762	53.0	–1.6
Registered electors		5,094		
Alliance hold		Swing	▲0.7	

=== Marshallwick South ===
Marshallwick South
Party	Candidate	Votes	%	±%
Alliance	A. Rowlands	1,285	44.4	+2.7
Conservative	A. Hill	1,281	44.2	–4.9
Labour	L. Adams	330	11.4	+2.2
Majority		4	0.2	N/A
Turnout		2,896	56.0	+3.8
Registered electors		5,171		
Alliance gain from Conservative		Swing	▲3.8	

=== Park Street ===
Park Street
Party	Candidate	Votes	%	±%
Alliance	W. Lawrence	935	51.9	–3.1
Conservative	S. Biggs	581	32.3	–3.0
Labour	J. Gipps	285	15.8	+6.1
Majority		354	19.7	±0.0
Turnout		1,801	42.0	–9.2
Registered electors		4,288		
Alliance hold		Swing	0.0	

=== Redbourn ===
Redbourn
Party	Candidate	Votes	%	±%
Conservative	D. Robinson*	1,065	46.9	+5.5
Alliance	P. Schofield	759	33.4	N/A
Labour	G. Harris	447	19.7	+4.3
Majority		306	13.5	N/A
Turnout		2,271	51.0	+3.9
Registered electors		4,453		
Conservative hold		Swing	N/A	

=== Sopwell ===
Sopwell
Party	Candidate	Votes	%	±%
Labour	K. Pollard*	1,245	48.1	+3.0
Alliance	M. Saunders	784	30.3	+2.8
Conservative	J. Rabuszko	562	21.7	–5.7
Majority		461	17.8	+0.3
Turnout		2,591	51.0	+5.3
Registered electors		5,080		
Labour hold		Swing	▲0.1	

=== St. Peters ===
St. Peters
Party	Candidate	Votes	%	±%
Alliance	P. Thompson*	1,037	46.4	–1.1
Labour	G. Powell	652	29.2	+2.9
Conservative	F. Newton	547	24.5	–1.8
Majority		385	17.2	–4.0
Turnout		2,236	50.0	–2.7
Registered electors		4,472		
Alliance hold		Swing	▼2.0	

=== St. Stephens ===
St. Stephens
Party	Candidate	Votes	%	±%
Conservative	M. Heap*	1,093	35.1	–8.1
Independent	A. Neasel	869	27.9	N/A
Alliance	F. Smith	812	26.1	–20.6
Labour	K. Morcom	341	10.9	+0.8
Majority		224	7.2	N/A
Turnout		3,115	54.0	–0.9
Registered electors		5,769		
Conservative hold		Swing	N/A	

=== Verulam ===
Verulam
Party	Candidate	Votes	%	±%
Conservative	R. Moss	1,404	49.1	–0.8
Alliance	C. White	1,107	38.7	–2.1
Labour	M. Bromberg	309	10.8	+1.5
Independent	A. Clifford	37	1.3	N/A
Majority		297	10.4	+1.3
Turnout		2,857	55.0	–2.9
Registered electors		5,195		
Conservative gain from Alliance		Swing	▲0.7	

=== Wheathampstead ===
Wheathampstead
Party	Candidate	Votes	%	±%
Alliance	S. Whittaker	1,356	52.0	+0.8
Conservative	R. Norsworthy	1,052	40.3	+0.7
Labour	J. McPheat	200	7.7	–1.5
Majority		304	11.7	+0.1
Turnout		2,608	54.0	+5.5
Registered electors		4,830		
Alliance gain from Conservative		Swing	0.0	
