= 1986 Derby City Council election =

1986 UK local government election

- 8 May 1986

15 of the 44 seats in the Derby City Council 23 seats needed for a majority
| | First party | Second party | Third party |
|---|---|---|---|
| Party | Labour | Conservative | Alliance |
| Last election | 24 | 18 | 2 |
| Seats won | 9 | 6 | 0 |
| Seats after | 25 | 17 | 2 |
| Seat change | ▲1 | ▼1 | Steady |
| Popular vote | 21,215 | 18,012 | 10,514 |
| Percentage | 42.7% | 36.2% | 21.1% |
- Map showing the results of the 1986 Derby City Council elections.
Council control before election
Labour
Council control after election
Labour

The 1986 Derby City Council election took place on 8 May 1986 to elect members of Derby City Council in England. Local elections were held in the United Kingdom in 1986. This was on the same day as other local elections. 15 of the council's 44 seats were up for election. The Labour Party retained control of the council.

== Overall results ==
1986 Derby City Council Election
| Party | Seats | Gains | Losses | Net gain/loss | Seats % | Votes % | Votes | +/− |
|---|---|---|---|---|---|---|---|---|
| Labour | 9 | 0 | 0 | Steady | 60.0 | 42.7 | 21,215 | |
| Conservative | 6 | 0 | 0 | Steady | 40.0 | 36.2 | 18,012 | |
| Alliance | 0 | 0 | 0 | Steady | 0.0 | 21.1 | 10,514 | |
| Total | 15 | | | | | | 49,741 | |

== Ward results ==
=== Abbey ===
Location of Abbey ward

Abbey
| Party | Candidate | Votes | % |
|---|---|---|---|
| Labour | M. Walker | 1,842 | 60.9% |
| Conservative | C. Base | 746 | 24.7% |
| Alliance | L. Wilson | 436 | 14.4% |
| Turnout | | | 30.6% |
| Labour hold | | | |

=== Allestree ===
Location of Allestree ward

Allestree
| Party | Candidate | Votes | % |
|---|---|---|---|
| Conservative | J. Thorpe | 2,563 | 62.3% |
| Alliance | H. Jones | 957 | 23.3% |
| Labour | R. Turner | 596 | 14.5% |
| Turnout | | | 49.9% |
| Conservative hold | | | |

=== Alvaston ===
Location of Alvaston ward

Alvaston
| Party | Candidate | Votes | % |
|---|---|---|---|
| Labour | W. Matthews | 1,284 | 42.7% |
| Alliance | D. Adams | 943 | 31.4% |
| Conservative | M. Bertalan | 780 | 25.9% |
| Turnout | | | 37.5% |
| Labour hold | | | |

=== Babington ===
Location of Babington ward

Babington
| Party | Candidate | Votes | % |
|---|---|---|---|
| Labour | B. Schofield | 1,663 | 57.0% |
| Alliance | M. Burgess | 763 | 26.2% |
| Conservative | P. Fullarton | 489 | 16.8% |
| Turnout | | | 35.2% |
| Labour hold | | | |

=== Blagreaves ===
Location of Blagreaves ward

Blagreaves
| Party | Candidate | Votes | % |
|---|---|---|---|
| Conservative | J. Keith | 1,599 | 42.0% |
| Labour | M. Ainsley | 1,518 | 39.9% |
| Alliance | D. George | 692 | 18.2% |
| Turnout | | | 47.3% |
| Conservative hold | | | |

=== Boulton ===
Location of Boulton ward

Boulton
| Party | Candidate | Votes | % |
|---|---|---|---|
| Labour | A. Kennedy | 1,680 | 43.3% |
| Conservative | B. Thompson | 1,140 | 29.4% |
| Alliance | P. Harlow | 1,056 | 27.2% |
| Turnout | | | 40.6% |
| Labour hold | | | |

=== Breadsall ===
Location of Breadsall ward

Breadsall
| Party | Candidate | Votes | % |
|---|---|---|---|
| Labour | E. Ward | 1,988 | 54.8% |
| Conservative | G. Andrews | 1,051 | 28.9% |
| Alliance | H. Holbrook | 592 | 16.3% |
| Turnout | | | 33.5% |
| Labour hold | | | |

=== Darley ===
Location of Darley ward

Darley
| Party | Candidate | Votes | % |
|---|---|---|---|
| Conservative | J. Tillett | 2,142 | 46.9% |
| Labour | M. Repton | 1,487 | 32.6% |
| Alliance | S. King | 935 | 20.5% |
| Turnout | | | 48.4% |
| Conservative hold | | | |

=== Littleover ===
Location of Littleover ward

Littleover
| Party | Candidate | Votes | % |
|---|---|---|---|
| Conservative | L. Shepley | 1,498 | 45.6% |
| Alliance | A. Cooper | 903 | 27.5% |
| Labour | J. Broughton | 887 | 27.0% |
| Turnout | | | 45.9% |
| Conservative hold | | | |

=== Mackworth ===
Location of Mackworth ward

Mackworth
| Party | Candidate | Votes | % |
|---|---|---|---|
| Labour | R. Baxter | 1,675 | 60.0% |
| Conservative | A. Mayell | 743 | 26.6% |
| Alliance | R. Jackson | 374 | 13.4% |
| Turnout | | | 38.1% |
| Labour hold | | | |

=== Mickleover ===
Location of Mickleover ward

Mickleover
| Party | Candidate | Votes | % |
|---|---|---|---|
| Conservative | N. Keene | 1,783 | 49.1% |
| Alliance | A. Wilbraham | 999 | 27.5% |
| Labour | M. McReynolds | 849 | 23.4% |
| Turnout | | | 43.3% |
| Conservative hold | | | |

=== Normanton ===
Location of Normanton ward

Normanton
| Party | Candidate | Votes | % |
|---|---|---|---|
| Labour | L. Shillingford | 1,584 | 58.6% |
| Conservative | K. Lester | 743 | 27.5% |
| Alliance | W. Drew | 375 | 13.9% |
| Turnout | | | 35.1% |
| Labour hold | | | |

=== Osmaston ===
Location of Osmaston ward

Osmaston
| Party | Candidate | Votes | % |
|---|---|---|---|
| Labour | R. Laxton | 1,226 | 71.2% |
| Conservative | D. Brown | 289 | 16.8% |
| Alliance | P. Elsbury | 208 | 12.1% |
| Turnout | | | 22.7% |
| Labour hold | | | |

=== Sinfin ===
Location of Sinfin ward

Sinfin
| Party | Candidate | Votes | % |
|---|---|---|---|
| Labour | N. Dhindsa | 1,517 | 60.4% |
| Conservative | B. Larimore | 595 | 23.7% |
| Alliance | P. James | 401 | 16.0% |
| Turnout | | | 33.5% |
| Labour hold | | | |

=== Spondon ===
Location of Spondon ward

Spondon
| Party | Candidate | Votes | % |
|---|---|---|---|
| Conservative | G. Du Sautoy | 1,851 | 44.6% |
| Labour | M. Tanvir | 1,419 | 34.2% |
| Alliance | R. Guilford | 880 | 21.2% |
| Turnout | | | 40.7% |
| Conservative hold | | | |
