= 1986 Cheltenham Borough Council election =

Cheltenham Borough Council election

The 1986 Cheltenham Council election took place on 8 May 1986 to elect members of Cheltenham Borough Council in Gloucestershire, England. One third of the council was up for election. The SDP–Liberal Alliance made gains but fell one seat short of a majority, meaning the council stayed in no overall control.

After the election, the composition of the council was

- SDP–Liberal Alliance 16
- Conservative 11
- Residents Associations 4
- Labour 2

== Election result ==
Cheltenham local election result 1986
Party	Seats	Gains	Losses	Net gain/loss	Seats %	Votes %	Votes	+/−
Alliance	8	2	0	+2	61.5	40.4	11,874	-2.3
Conservative	3	0	1	-1	23.1	35.4	10,427	-3.9
Labour	1	1	1	-	7.7	16.3	4,793	+3.0
Residents	1	0	0	-	7.7	4.6	1,358	-0.1
Independent Ratepayer	0	0	1	-1	0.0	3.3	963	N/A

== Ward results ==
All Saints
Party	Candidate	Votes	%	±%
Alliance	Adelaide Hodges*	1,261	47.5	−0.1
Alliance	Stephen Jordan	1,146	43.2	−4.4
Conservative	Daphne Pennell	1,079	40.7	−1.4
Conservative	Anthony Cronk	1,048	39.5	−2.6
Labour	Diana Hale	412	15.5	+5.3
Labour	Reginald Pope	350	13.2	+3.0
Majority		67	2.5	
Turnout		2,654	38.86	
Alliance hold		Swing		
Alliance hold		Swing		

Charlton Kings
Party	Candidate	Votes	%	±%
Residents	Donald Perry*	1,356	39.4	−12.2
Alliance	Rosemary Daffurn	1,223	35.5	N/A
Conservative	Nicholas Norman	864	25.1	−15.1
Majority		133	3.9	
Turnout		3,443	53.89	
Residents hold		Swing		

College
Party	Candidate	Votes	%	±%
Conservative	Bryan Howell*	1,782	51.0	+4.6
Alliance	Garth Barnes	1,481	42.4	−6.3
Labour	Louise Luker	228	6.5	+1.6
Majority		301	8.6	
Turnout		3,491	51.28	
Conservative hold		Swing		

Hatherley
Party	Candidate	Votes	%	±%
Alliance	Eric Phillips*	1,490	60.6	+2.8
Alliance	Dorothy Rosser-Smith	1,339	54.4	−3.4
Conservative	Timothy Ockwell	974	39.6	+6.2
Conservative	Annalisa Shahlaei	819	33.3	−0.1
Labour	Andrew Palmer	294	12.0	+3.2
Majority		365	14.8	
Turnout		2,460	37.93	
Alliance hold		Swing		
Alliance hold		Swing		

Hesters Way
Party	Candidate	Votes	%	±%
Alliance	Alistair Cameron	947	36.0	+8.8
Labour	Terence Ruck*	870	33.1	−0.1
Conservative	Brian Chaplin	811	30.9	−8.7
Majority		77	2.9	
Turnout		2,628	37.21	
Alliance gain from Labour		Swing		

Lansdown
Party	Candidate	Votes	%	±%
Conservative	May Dent*	1,307	55.9	−1.1
Alliance	Clive Lloyd	753	32.2	−2.1
Labour	Linda Stapleton	279	11.9	+3.1
Majority		554	23.7	
Turnout		2,339	40.75	
Conservative hold		Swing		

Park
Party	Candidate	Votes	%	±%
Conservative	Maureen Stafford*	1,586	57.4	+2.5
Alliance	Joyce Norman	961	34.8	−10.3
Labour	Maria Bottomley	216	7.8	N/A
Majority		625	22.6	
Turnout		2,763	49.62	
Conservative hold		Swing		

Pittville
Party	Candidate	Votes	%	±%
Labour	Martin Hale	1,070	40.9	+4.9
Conservative	Kenneth Burke*	883	33.8	+1.4
Alliance	Alan Wadley	661	25.3	−6.3
Majority		187	7.1	
Turnout		2,614	42.31	
Labour gain from Conservative		Swing		

St Mark's
Party	Candidate	Votes	%	±%
Alliance	Janet Watson*	1,099	53.0	−11.8
Labour	Jonquil Naish	585	28.2	+13.4
Conservative	Simon Richards	390	18.8	−1.6
Majority		514	24.8	
Turnout		2,074	35.60	
Alliance hold		Swing		

St Paul's
Party	Candidate	Votes	%	±%
Alliance	Deborah Griggs	1,045	45.6	−10.3
Independent Ratepayer	Dudley Aldridge*	963	42.0	N/A
Labour	Sandra Thomas	285	12.4	±0.0
Majority		82	3.6	
Turnout		2,293	41.22	
Alliance gain from Ind. Conservative		Swing		

St Peter's
Party	Candidate	Votes	%	±%
Alliance	Pat Thornton	953	42.2	−11.8
Conservative	Antony English	751	33.3	+3.3
Labour	Phillip Chappell	554	24.5	+8.5
Majority		202	8.9	
Turnout		2,258	38.60	
Alliance hold		Swing		
