= 1986 Gloucester City Council election =

UK local election

The 1986 Gloucester City Council election took place on 3 May 1986 to elect members of Gloucester City Council in England.

== Results ==
Gloucester City Council election, 1986
Party	Seats	Gains	Losses	Net gain/loss	Seats %	Votes %	Votes	+/−
Conservative	15				45.5			
Labour	12				36.4			
Alliance	5				15.2			
Other	1				3.0			

== Ward results ==
=== Barnwood ===
Barnwood 1986
Party	Candidate	Votes	%	±%
Conservative	D.* Hartshorne	1,807	45.8	
Labour	E. Waldon	1,604	40.6	
Alliance	M. O'Connor	536	13.6	
Turnout		3,947	45.8	
Conservative gain from Labour		Swing		

=== Barton ===
Barton 1986
Party	Candidate	Votes	%	±%
Conservative	A.* Gravells	1,207	49.1	
Labour	D. Evans	1,102	44.8	
Alliance	E. Drinan	150	6.1	
Turnout		2,459	42.3	
Conservative gain from Labour		Swing		

=== Eastgate ===
Eastgate 1986
Party	Candidate	Votes	%	±%
Labour	D.* Short	1,334	51.9	
Conservative	Y. Pandor	852	33.2	
Alliance	H. Rose	383	14.9	
Turnout		2,569	44.1	
Labour hold		Swing		

=== Hucclecote ===
Hucclecote 1986
Party	Candidate	Votes	%	±%
Conservative	P.* Arnold	1,531	47.0	
Alliance	R. Cox	1,221	37.5	
Labour	M. Lawlor	506	15.5	
Turnout		3,258	51.8	
Conservative hold		Swing		

=== Kingsholm ===
Kingsholm 1986
Party	Candidate	Votes	%	±%
Conservative	D. Philip	1,466	44.8	
Alliance	J.* Hilton	1,297	39.7	
Labour	M. Harriot	508	15.5	
Turnout		3,271	53.2	
Conservative gain from Alliance		Swing		

=== Linden ===
Linden 1986
Party	Candidate	Votes	%	±%
Conservative	P. Evans	1,170	43.8	
Labour	C. Glover	1,098	41.1	
Alliance	A. Gribble	404	15.1	
Turnout		2,672	46.8	
Conservative hold		Swing		

=== Longlevens ===
Longlevens 1986
Party	Candidate	Votes	%	±%
Conservative	P. Grant-Hudson	1,548	49.5	
Labour	T. Sherwood	911	29.2	
Alliance	J. Goodwin	666	21.3	
Turnout		3,125	49.6	
Conservative hold		Swing		

=== Matson ===
Matson 1986
Party	Candidate	Votes	%	±%
Labour	T. Potts	1,315	61.7	
Conservative	G. Parrott	547	25.6	
Alliance	J. Green	271	12.7	
Turnout		2,133	33.8	
Labour gain from Conservative		Swing		

=== Podsmead ===
Podsmead 1986
Party	Candidate	Votes	%	±%
Alliance	R.* Gibbs	1,399	48.9	
Conservative	Ms. E. Orr	761	26.6	
Labour	P. Glover	699	24.4	
Turnout		2,859	48.3	
Alliance gain from Conservative		Swing		

=== Tuffley ===
Tuffley 1986
Party	Candidate	Votes	%	±%
Labour	N. Durrant	1,436	45.4	
Conservative	J. Phillips	1,166	36.9	
Alliance	S. O'Connor	558	17.7	
Turnout		3,160	50.8	
Labour hold		Swing		

=== Westgate ===
Westgate 1986
Party	Candidate	Votes	%	±%
Alliance	R. Welshman	1,031	41.3	
Conservative	R. Smith	963	38.6	
Labour	D. James	504	20.2	
Turnout		2,498	46.9	
Alliance hold		Swing		
