= 1986 Dumfries and Galloway Regional Council election =

1986 Scottish local government election

← 1982	8 May 1986	1990 →

All 35 seats to Dumfries and Galloway Regional Council 18 seats needed for a majority
	First party	Second party
Party	Independent	Labour
Last election	22 seats, 51.1%	4 seats, 5.1%
Seats won	19	7
Seat change	▼3	▲3
Popular vote	12,413	5,540
Percentage	45.7%	20.4%
Swing	▼5.4%	▲15.3%
	Third party	Fourth party
Party	SNP	Alliance
Last election	3 seats, 15.3%	2 seats, 15.6%
Seats won	5	4
Seat change	▲2	▲2
Popular vote	2,957	3,767
Percentage	10.9%	13.9%
Swing	▼4.4%	▼1.7%

The fourth Dumfries and Galloway Regional Council election was held on 8 May 1986.

== Results ==
1986 Dumfries and Galloway Regional Council election result
Party	Seats	Gains	Losses	Net gain/loss	Seats %	Votes %	Votes	+/−
Independent	19			▼3	54.3	45.7	12,413	▼5.4
Labour	7			▲3	20.0	20.4	5,540	▲15.3
SNP	5			▲2	14.3	10.9	2,957	▼4.4
Alliance	4			▲2	11.4	13.9	3,767	▼1.7
Conservative	0			▼4	0.0	9.1	2,468	▼3.8
