= 1986 Wolverhampton Metropolitan Borough Council election =

1986 UK local government election

The 1986 Council elections held in Wolverhampton on Thursday 1 May 1986 were one third, and 20 of the 60 seats were up for election.

Due to a vacancy in Wednesfield North two members were elected.

The Labour Party gained the following wards from the Conservatives:

Bilston North, Fallings Park, Oxley, Wednesfield North (1 seat).

The SDP/Liberal Alliance gained Spring Vale from Labour.

Prior to the election the constitution of the council was:

- Labour 34
- Conservative 23
- Alliance 2
- Vacancy 1

Following the election the constitution of the council was:

- Labour 38
- Conservative 19
- Alliance 3

== Ward results ==
Bilston East
Party	Candidate	Votes	%	±%
Labour	N Davies	1868		
Alliance	R Gray	597		
Conservative	Mrs F Rixon	319		
Majority		1271		

Bilston North
Party	Candidate	Votes	%	±%
Labour	Mrs T Bowen	2065		
Conservative	C Barber	956		
Alliance	T Perkins	745		
Majority		1109		

Blakenhall
Party	Candidate	Votes	%	±%
Labour	J Rowley	2475		
Conservative		1174		
Alliance	J O'Brien	497		
Majority		1301		

Bushbury
Party	Candidate	Votes	%	±%
Conservative	G Patten	1663		
Labour	T Barratt	1546		
Alliance	T Whitehouse	606		
Majority		117		

East Park
Party	Candidate	Votes	%	±%
Labour	G Howells	1584		
Alliance	J Steatham	1342		
Conservative	Mrs J Shore	326		
Majority		242		

Ettingshall
Party	Candidate	Votes	%	±%
Labour	E Bold	2058		
Conservative	A Mills	452		
Alliance	J White	289		
Majority		1606		

Fallings Park
Party	Candidate	Votes	%	±%
Labour	Mrs J Hill	1838		
Conservative	Mrs J Lenoir	1360		
Alliance	E George	493		
Majority		478		

Graiseley
Party	Candidate	Votes	%	±%
Labour	F Ledsam	2426		
Conservative	J Mellor	1844		
Alliance	E Rawlinson	537		
Majority		582		

Heath Town
Party	Candidate	Votes	%	±%
Labour	K Purchase	1773		
Conservative	B Ingram	719		
Alliance	C Hallmark	572		
Majority		1054		

Low Hill
Party	Candidate	Votes	%	±%
Labour	Peter Bilson	2171		
Conservative	K Gliwitzki	636		
Alliance	Mrs S Thompson	327		
Majority		1535		

Merry Hill
Party	Candidate	Votes	%	±%
Conservative	W Clarke	2158		
Alliance	B Lamb	1115		
Labour	D McKatrick	911		
Majority		1043		

Oxley
Party	Candidate	Votes	%	±%
Labour	Mrs K Clifford	1881		
Conservative	F Haley	1363		
Alliance	M Turley	472		
Majority		518		

Park
Party	Candidate	Votes	%	±%
Conservative	M Griffiths	2333		
Labour	J Botteley	1744		
Alliance	P McGloin	758		
Majority		589		

Penn
Party	Candidate	Votes	%	±%
Conservative	J Carpenter	2674		
Alliance	R Jones	1190		
Labour	G S Rai	584		
Majority		1484		

St Peter's
Party	Candidate	Votes	%	±%
Labour	A M Powell	3209		
Conservative	R Ward	517		
Alliance	B Lewis	374		
Majority		2696		

Spring Vale
Party	Candidate	Votes	%	±%
Alliance	A Pye	2196		
Labour	B Burden	2061		
Conservative	D Darley	447		
Majority		135		

Tettenhall Regis
Party	Candidate	Votes	%	±%
Alliance	L McLean	2357		
Conservative	W Moffat	1801		
Labour	L Turner	570		
Majority		558		

Tettenhall Wightwick
Party	Candidate	Votes	%	±%
Conservative	R Watson	2375		
Alliance	D Pottle	1196		
Labour	Mrs B Hill	606		
Majority		1179		

Wednesfield North
Party	Candidate	Votes	%	±%
Labour	Miss J Walton	1799		
Labour	J Woodward	1780		
Conservative	G Jones	1399		
Conservative	Mrs H Phillips	1225		
Alliance	M Pearson	857		
Alliance	Mrs J Lamb	743		

Wednesfield South
Party	Candidate	Votes	%	±%
Labour	Mrs L Leader	2012		
Conservative	Mrs R Ball	1046		
Alliance	J Speakman	639		
Majority		966		
