= 1986 Sutton London Borough Council election =

1986 local election in England

Sutton Council Election, 1986
- 8 May 1986

All 56 seats, in 25 wards in the London Borough of Sutton 29 seats needed for a majority
- Turnout: 51.1%
	Majority party	Minority party	Third party
Leader	Graham Tope	David Trafford	Unknown
Party	Alliance	Conservative	Labour
Leader since		1980	N/A
Leader's seat	Sutton Central	Worcester Park South (defeated)	N/A
Seats won	28	21	7
Percentage	41.9%	39.8%	16.7%
Leader of the Council before election
David Trafford
Conservative
Elected Leader
Graham Tope
Liberal

The 1986 Sutton Council election took place on 8 May 1986 to elect members of Sutton London Borough Council in London, England. The whole council was up for election and the council went into no overall control.

== Election result ==
Sutton Council election result 1986
Party	Seats	Gains	Losses	Net gain/loss	Seats %	Votes %	Votes	+/−
Alliance	28				50.0	41.9		
Conservative	21				37.5	39.8		
Labour	7				12.5	16.7		
Other	0				0.0	1.7		

== Ward results ==
Beddington North (2)
Party	Candidate	Votes	%	±%
Liberal	Joan A. Dutton	1,194	46.7	+3.6
Liberal	Sylvia K. Doubell	1,138		
Conservative	Francis McNamara*	989	38.7	−9.3
Conservative	Roy F. Whitehair**	878		
Labour	John R. Bray	372	14.6	
Labour	Raymond G. Moore	349		
Majority			8.0	12.9
Turnout			53.0	▼1.4
Registered electors		4,946		
Liberal gain from Conservative		Swing		
Liberal gain from Conservative		Swing		

Beddington South (3)
Party	Candidate	Votes	%	±%
SDP	Colleen Saunders	1,406	41.2	+7.2
SDP	Kenneth R. Bishop	1,325		
SDP	Frances Wurm	1,248		
Labour	Philip J. Bassett	1,057	31.0	+5.7
Labour	Ms Doris A. Richards	973		
Labour	Ms Violet J. Scotter	959		
Conservative	Henry R. C. Sawyers*	946	27.8	−12.9
Conservative	John R. Belcher	943		
Conservative	Peter A. A. Roffe	932		
Majority			10.2	16.8
Turnout			48.8	▲2.2
Registered electors		7,245		
SDP gain from Conservative		Swing		
SDP gain from Conservative		Swing		
SDP gain from Conservative		Swing		

Belmont (2)
Party	Candidate	Votes	%	±%
Conservative	Lesley Barber	1,402	61.1	−4.8
Conservative	Joyce K M Bowley*	1,395		
Liberal	Barry Reed	693	30.2	+2.8
SDP	Glyn Saunders	683		
Labour	B Brennan	201	8.8	
Labour	Ms J Lawler	193		
Majority			30.9	−7.6
Turnout			44.5	▼5.0
Registered electors		5,429		
Conservative hold		Swing		
Conservative hold		Swing		

Carshalton Beeches (3)
Party	Candidate	Votes	%	±%
Conservative	Edward J Crowley*	2,108	57.9	
Conservative	Keith J Martin*	2,044		
Conservative	Mavis Peart*	2,037		
SDP	Richard Exact	906	24.9	−1.7
Liberal	John Phillimore	882		
SDP	Gary Miles	854		
Labour	John M. Bloom	353	9.7	
Labour	Richard H. Taylor	341		
Labour	Robert C. Scarlett	314		
Green	Walter S. L. Holt	274	7.5	
Majority			33.0	
Turnout			50.9	▼4.6
Registered electors		7,082		
Conservative hold		Swing		
Conservative hold		Swing		
Conservative hold		Swing		

Carshalton Central (2)
Party	Candidate	Votes	%	±%
SDP	John A. Jukes	1,165		
Conservative	Peter N. Baggott*	1,123		
Liberal	Robert R. Landeryou	1,119		
Conservative	John Stapley	967		
Labour	Patrick O'Keeffe	344		
Labour	Michael J. Radburn	277		
Green	William E. Fuller	132		
Majority				
Turnout			55.5	▲5.0
Registered electors		4,986		
SDP gain from Conservative		Swing		
Conservative hold		Swing		

Carshalton North (2)
Party	Candidate	Votes	%	±%
Liberal	Thomas Edward Dutton	1,450		
Liberal	Michael A. Cooper*	1,356		
Conservative	Denis Kerslake	991		
Conservative	Margaret Paull	899		
Labour	Anthony R. Powell	405		
Labour	Kathleen M. Smith	401		
Majority				
Turnout			55.1	0.0
Registered electors		5,475		
Liberal gain from Conservative		Swing		
Liberal gain from Conservative		Swing		

Cheam South (2)
Party	Candidate	Votes	%	±%
Conservative	Lynette G. Ranson	1,678		
Conservative	Edward G. Trevor*	1,659		
Liberal	Frank W. Sharp	449		
SDP	Agatha P. Myers	416		
Labour	Roy Baker	95		
Labour	Peter J. Henshall	88		
Majority				
Turnout			49.0	▼5.4
Registered electors		4,718		
Conservative hold		Swing		
Conservative hold		Swing		

Cheam West (2)
Party	Candidate	Votes	%	±%
Conservative	Kenneth I. Cole*	1,316		
Conservative	Deborah M. A. Mangnall*	1,279		
Liberal	Judith A. Franklin	935		
Liberal	Simon D. Wales	881		
Labour	Patricia M. Brown	165		
Labour	Catherine E. Pestano	154		
Majority				
Turnout			55.6	▼4.5
Registered electors		4,495		
Conservative hold		Swing		
Conservative hold		Swing		

Clockhouse (1)
Party	Candidate	Votes	%	±%
Conservative	Malcolm P. Garner	421		
SDP	Robert J. Irving	393		
Labour	Douglas J. Banks	139		
Majority				
Turnout			57.1	▲1.2
Registered electors		1,669		
Conservative hold		Swing		

North Cheam (2)
Party	Candidate	Votes	%	±%
Liberal	Anthony Brett Young	1,603		
SDP	Valerie R. Price	1,526		
Conservative	Clifford C. G. Carter*	993		
Conservative	John J. Sharvill*	990		
Labour	Margaret Sinclair	176		
Labour	Kevin J. Willsher	156		
Majority				
Turnout			58.2	▼0.7
Registered electors		4,933		
Liberal gain from Conservative		Swing		
SDP gain from Conservative		Swing		

Rosehill (2)
Party	Candidate	Votes	%	±%
Liberal	Stephen J. Penneck	1,494		
SDP	Paul K. Burstow	1,425		
Conservative	Anne M. Rawlinson	778		
Conservative	Lorna Rayne	698		
Labour	Josephine M. Harvey	317		
Labour	Jeffrey F. Hunt	306		
Majority				
Turnout			56.4	▲3.4
Registered electors		4,711		
Liberal gain from Conservative		Swing		
SDP gain from Conservative		Swing		

St Helier North (3)
Party	Candidate	Votes	%	±%
Labour	Patrick B. Kane*	1,638		
Labour	Albert G. A. Dyson*	1,630		
Labour	Donald B. Hopkins	1,552		
Conservative	Gwendolen M. Bates	520		
Conservative	Hilda M. Harding	507		
Conservative	Joyce G. Shanks	495		
SDP	Stanley A. G. Theed	455		
Liberal	William E. Ward	452		
SDP	Aidan P. Tierney	427		
Majority				
Turnout			40.4	▲3.8
Registered electors		6,924		
Labour hold		Swing		
Labour hold		Swing		
Labour hold		Swing		

St Helier South (2)
Party	Candidate	Votes	%	±%
Labour	Charles J. Mansell	1,066		
Labour	John A. S. Weir	1,020		
SDP	John S. G. Bass	379		
SDP	Vinod Sharma	328		
Conservative	Timothy E. Crowley	222		
Conservative	Jeffrey E. Gregory	205		
Majority				
Turnout			41.3	▲1.6
Registered electors		4,187		
Labour hold		Swing		
Labour hold		Swing		

Sutton Central (2)
Party	Candidate	Votes	%	±%
Liberal	Graham Norman Tope*	1,591		
Liberal	Rev. John Aubrey Mullin*	1,521		
Conservative	Glyn H. George	508		
Conservative	Gary Eales	504		
Labour	Peter J. Storey	264		
Labour	Peter C. Randall	257		
Majority				
Turnout			47.6	▼4.8
Registered electors		5,149		
Liberal hold		Swing		
Liberal hold		Swing		

Sutton Common (2)
Party	Candidate	Votes	%	±%
Liberal	Elizabeth Sharp	1,458		
Liberal	Lesley O'Connell	1,437		
Conservative	Pauline Kavanagh*	936		
Conservative	Alan Deards	918		
Labour	Allan T. Wilson	187		
Labour	Pamela L. Selous-Hedges	183		
Majority				
Turnout			55.8	▲0.1
Registered electors		4,752		
Liberal gain from Conservative		Swing		
Liberal gain from Conservative		Swing		

Sutton East (3)
Party	Candidate	Votes	%	±%
Liberal	Neil Frater	1,399		
Liberal	John F. Brennan	1,395		
SDP	Terence A. Woods	1,326		
Conservative	David Hogg	846		
Conservative	John W. Perkins	804		
Conservative	Heather Shaw	802		
Labour	Anthony R. Thorpe	585		
Labour	Jeremy L. Cullen	577		
Labour	Trevor E. Webb	534		
Independent	Lawrence Brooks	57		
Majority				
Turnout			52.8	▼0.5
Registered electors		5,774		
Liberal gain from Conservative		Swing		
Liberal gain from Conservative		Swing		
SDP gain from Conservative		Swing		

Sutton South (3)
Party	Candidate	Votes	%	±%
Conservative	Peter H. Geiringer*	1,769		
Conservative	Paul T. Mangnall*	1,756		
Conservative	Richard T. Barber*	1,753		
SDP	Carol Campbell	926		
SDP	Dora C. Flew	905		
Liberal	Cicely J. Willis	868		
Labour	Geoffrey Brennan	449		
Labour	Gary M. Brennan	433		
Labour	Patrick J. J. Cunnane	413		
Green	Richard F. Allen	136		
Majority				
Turnout			43.1	▼6.4
Registered electors		7,785		
Conservative hold		Swing		
Conservative hold		Swing		
Conservative hold		Swing		

Sutton West (2)
Party	Candidate	Votes	%	±%
Liberal	Christopher Caswill	1,549		
Liberal	Lynette Gleeson	1,442		
Conservative	Simon McIlwaine	902		
Conservative	Linda Verner	886		
Labour	Christopher E. Jones	149		
Labour	Ronald S. Williams	143		
Majority				
Turnout			59.1	▼1.9
Registered electors		4,473		
Liberal gain from Conservative		Swing		
Liberal hold		Swing		

Wallington North (3)
Party	Candidate	Votes	%	±%
Conservative	Jack Izard*	1,693		
Conservative	Joan Quattrucci	1,636		
Conservative	Michael Pike	1,626		
Liberal	Joseph Farrelly	1,254		
SDP	Kishore Gumaste	1,182		
Liberal	Robert Landeryou	1,179		
Labour	John Willmot	460		
Labour	Susan F. Gammon	458		
Labour	Peter J. Turner	442		
Green	Jacqueline M. W. Dow	149		
Green	Nick McDonagh-Greaves	118		
Green	Walter S. L. Holt	113		
Majority				
Turnout			50.4	▼4.2
Registered electors		7,136		
Conservative hold		Swing		
Conservative hold		Swing		
Conservative hold		Swing		

Wallington South (3)
Party	Candidate	Votes	%	±%
Conservative	Frederick Townsend*	1,147		
Conservative	Lynda Burrows	1,101		
Conservative	David Waterman	1,093		
SDP	Richard Sammons	1,049		
Liberal	Alison Rogers	963		
SDP	John Drage	959		
Conservative Democratic	Robert F. Johnson	787		
Conservative Democratic	Carole J. Dalby	634		
Conservative Democratic	Stuart D. Earley	579		
Labour	David N. Murray	502		
Labour	Michael J. McLoughlin	486		
Labour	Clive S. Poge	463		
Green	Helene G. McDonagh-Greaves	122		
Majority				
Turnout			46.7	▼1.2
Registered electors		7,472		
Conservative hold		Swing		
Conservative hold		Swing		
Conservative hold		Swing		

Wandle Valley (2)
Party	Candidate	Votes	%	±%
Labour	Michael R. Woolley*			
Labour	Malcolm C. Smith*	883		
SDP	June S. Crow	638		
SDP	John F. Barlow	631		
Conservative	Alan S. May	351		
Conservative	Alison J. Pike	317		
Majority				
Turnout			52.0	▲0.9
Registered electors		3,871		
Labour hold		Swing		
Labour hold		Swing		

Woodcote (1)
Party	Candidate	Votes	%	±%
Conservative	Graham Witham*	957		
Liberal	Graham Sharp	248		
Labour	Ann K. Poge	82		
Green	Peter F. Ticher	39		
Majority				
Turnout			49.8	▼4.1
Registered electors		2,667		
Conservative hold		Swing		

Worcester Park North (3)
Party	Candidate	Votes	%	±%
Liberal	Ruth Mary Shaw	1,835		
Liberal	Keith J. S. Pitkin	1,810		
SDP	Gareth W. Campbell	1,788		
Conservative	Peter A. C. Woolley*	1,376		
Conservative	Janet S. Woolley*	1,372		
Conservative	Ann Tims*	1,349		
Labour	Susanne J. Mitchell	317		
Labour	John F. Graham	304		
Labour	Lina Graham	280		
Majority				
Turnout			54.9	▲2.3
Registered electors		6,782		
Liberal gain from Conservative		Swing		
Liberal gain from Conservative		Swing		
SDP gain from Conservative		Swing		

Worcester Park South (2)
Party	Candidate	Votes	%	±%
Liberal	Roger D. Roberts	1,489		
SDP	Michael J. Shaw	1,422		
Conservative	Richard Anthony Kerslake*	1,163		
Conservative	David J. H. Trafford*	1,070		
Labour	Patrick R. Imrie	144		
Labour	Alan P. Matusevics	130		
Majority				
Turnout			62.5	▼0.5
Registered electors		4,632		
Liberal gain from Conservative		Swing		
SDP gain from Conservative		Swing		

Wrythe Green (2)
Party	Candidate	Votes	%	±%
SDP	Teresa M. Munro	1,446		
Liberal	Duncan R. Ponikwer	1,385		
Conservative	John Howard	739		
Conservative	Bruce Newman	732		
Labour	Richard T. Mackie	595		
Labour	Frank L. Syratt	530		
Majority				
Turnout			53.3	▲2.0
Registered electors		5,474		
SDP gain from Conservative		Swing		
Liberal gain from Conservative		Swing		
