= 1976 Colchester Borough Council election =

1976 English local government election

- 6 May 1976

All 60 seats to Colchester Borough Council 31 seats needed for a majority
- Registered: 89,137
- Turnout: 47.5%
	First party	Second party	Third party
Party	Conservative	Labour	Residents
Last election	28 seats, 43.1%	26 seats, 44.1%	3 seats, 0.7%
Seats won	39	18	2
Seat change	▲11	▼9	▼1
Popular vote	51,152	29,001	2,855
Percentage	55.9%	31.7%	3.1%
Swing	▲12.8%	▼12.7%	▲2.4%
	Fourth party	Fifth party
Party	Independent	Liberal
Last election	1 seat, 5.4%	1 seat, 6.4%
Seats won	1	0
Seat change	Steady	▼1
Popular vote	1,339	7,199
Percentage	1.5%	7.9%
Swing	▼3.9%	▲1.5%
- Winner of each seat at the 1976 Colchester Borough Council election.
Council control before election
No overall control
Council control after election
Conservative

The 1976 Colchester Borough Council election took place on 6 May 1976 to elect members to Colchester Borough Council in Essex, England. This was on the same day as other local elections across the country. The whole council was up for election on new ward boundaries.

The Conservatives gained the council from no overall control.

== Summary ==
=== Election result ===
1976 Colchester Borough Council election
Party	This election				Full council			This election		
Party	Candidates	Seats	Net	Seats %	Other	Total	Total %	Votes	Votes %	+/−
Conservative	60	39	▲11	65.0	0	39	65.0	51,152	55.9	+12.8
Labour	41	18	▼9	30.0	0	18	30.0	29,001	31.7	–12.7
Residents	3	2	▼1	3.3	0	2	3.3	2,855	3.1	+2.4
Independent	4	1	Steady	1.7	0	1	1.7	1,339	1.5	–3.9
Liberal	19	0	▼1	0.0	0	0	0.0	7,199	7.9	+1.5

== Ward results ==
=== Berechurch ===
Berechurch
Party	Candidate	Votes	%
Labour	W. Ladbrook	770	37.2
Labour	C. Howe	769	37.1
Conservative	L. Long	742	35.8
Labour	R. McQuitty	741	35.8
Conservative	V. Worth	675	32.6
Conservative	Nigel Chapman	642	31.0
Liberal	M. Gage	611	29.5
Liberal	T. Davis	389	18.8
Turnout		2,070	38.1
Registered electors		5,432	
Labour win (new seat)			
Labour win (new seat)			
Conservative win (new seat)			

=== Birch-Messing ===
Birch-Messing
Party	Candidate	Votes	%	±%
Independent	T. Wayman	546	70.0	N/A
Conservative	J. Crowe	234	30.0	−11.9
Majority		312	40.0	N/A
Turnout		780	61.6	−9.2
Registered electors		1,267		
Independent gain from Conservative		Swing	N/A	

=== Boxted & Langham ===
Boxted & Langham
Party	Candidate	Votes	%	±%
Conservative	A. Sexton	699	85.2	+14.0
Labour	T. Morecroft	121	14.8	+0.2
Majority		576	70.4	+13.8
Turnout		820	51.7	+4.4
Registered electors		1,586		
Conservative hold		Swing	▲6.9	

=== Castle ===
Castle
Party	Candidate	Votes	%
Labour	S. Wills	1,122	47.5
Labour	J. Dunn	1,048	44.4
Labour	Ken Cooke	1,025	43.4
Conservative	D. Lamberth	1,023	43.3
Conservative	K. Wheeler	995	42.1
Conservative	K. Wilson	969	41.0
Liberal	O. Reeves	196	8.3
Liberal	D. Marshall	185	7.8
Liberal	P. Mills	184	7.8
Turnout		2,361	49.2
Registered electors		4,799	
Labour win (new seat)			
Labour win (new seat)			
Labour win (new seat)			

=== Copford & Eight Ash Green ===
Copford & Eight Ash Green
Party	Candidate	Votes	%	±%
Conservative	M. Wilde	610	76.6	+14.4
Labour	D. Clark	186	23.4	+5.7
Majority		424	53.2	+8.7
Turnout		796	47.6	+8.0
Registered electors		1,554		
Conservative hold		Swing	▲4.4	

=== Dedham ===
Dedham
Party	Candidate	Votes	%	±%
Conservative	J. Jackson	474	67.0	+14.7
Independent	G. Curtis	233	33.0	N/A
Majority		241	34.0	+8.6
Turnout		707	52.3	−6.2
Registered electors		1,355		
Conservative hold		Swing	N/A	

=== East Donyland ===
East Donyland
Party	Candidate	Votes	%	±%
Conservative	J. Sanderson	482	57.6	+7.3
Labour	E. Lilley	355	42.4	−7.3
Majority		127	15.2	+14.6
Turnout		837	67.3	+10.7
Registered electors		1,245		
Conservative hold		Swing	▲7.3	

=== Fordham ===
Fordham
Party	Candidate	Votes	%	±%
Conservative	G. Penrose	448	55.2	+17.6
Liberal	G. Williams	363	44.8	N/A
Majority		85	10.4	N/A
Turnout		811	63.8	+9.7
Registered electors		1,275		
Conservative gain from Independent		Swing	N/A	

=== Great & Little Horkesley ===
Great & Little Horkesley
Party	Candidate	Votes	%	±%
Conservative	W. Knighton	Unopposed		
Registered electors		1,554		
Conservative win (new seat)				

=== Great Tey ===
Great Tey
Party	Candidate	Votes	%	±%
Conservative	R. Browning	Unopposed		
Registered electors		1,341		
Conservative hold				

=== Harbour ===
Harbour
Party	Candidate	Votes	%
Labour	J. Bird	989	44.7
Conservative	M. Coyne	915	41.3
Conservative	E. White	877	39.6
Labour	C. Parmenter	839	37.9
Labour	A. Blishen	834	37.7
Conservative	K. White	827	37.4
Liberal	D. Wisbey	263	11.9
Liberal	N. Wake	261	11.8
Turnout		2,213	45.9
Registered electors		4,822	
Labour win (new seat)			
Conservative win (new seat)			
Conservative win (new seat)			

=== Lexden ===
Lexden
Party	Candidate	Votes	%
Conservative	J. Wheeler	1,403	62.9
Conservative	C. Sargeant	1,402	62.9
Conservative	D. Holt	1,375	61.7
Liberal	M. Fisher	506	22.7
Liberal	C. Cole	441	19.8
Liberal	Ian Trusler	437	19.6
Labour	J. Coombes	362	16.2
Turnout		2,229	58.3
Registered electors		3,824	
Conservative win (new seat)			
Conservative win (new seat)			
Conservative win (new seat)			

=== Marks Tey ===
Marks Tey
Party	Candidate	Votes	%	±%
Conservative	E. James	566	78.2	+9.7
Labour	Jim Orpe	158	21.8	−9.7
Majority		408	56.4	N/A
Turnout		724	47.7	−5.8
Registered electors		1,525		
Conservative hold		Swing	▲9.7	

=== Mile End ===
Mile End
Party	Candidate	Votes	%
Conservative	D. Blackmore	1,119	70.4
Conservative	D. Fulford	1,087	68.4
Conservative	J. Fulford	1,084	68.2
Labour	P. Baker	489	30.8
Turnout		1,590	47.2
Registered electors		3,369	
Conservative win (new seat)			
Conservative win (new seat)			
Conservative win (new seat)			

=== New Town ===
New Town
Party	Candidate	Votes	%
Labour	Bob Russell	1,284	56.6
Labour	D. Williams	1,191	52.5
Labour	J. Bensusan-Butt	1,078	47.5
Conservative	E. Chapman	640	28.2
Conservative	C. Willburn	606	26.7
Conservative	M. Harvey	541	23.9
Liberal	T. Brady	525	23.1
Liberal	A. Grant	408	18.0
Liberal	M. Pawsey	373	16.4
Turnout		2,268	48.7
Registered electors		4,656	
Labour win (new seat)			
Labour win (new seat)			
Labour win (new seat)			

=== Prettygate ===
Prettygate
Party	Candidate	Votes	%
Conservative	E. Kent	1,378	61.1
Conservative	F. Clater	1,362	60.4
Conservative	D. Purvis	1,356	60.1
Labour	R. Read	664	29.4
Labour	B. Sawyer	588	26.1
Labour	P. Perera	545	24.2
Liberal	J. Smith	415	18.4
Turnout		2,255	47.0
Registered electors		4,798	
Conservative win (new seat)			
Conservative win (new seat)			
Conservative win (new seat)			

=== Pyefleet ===
Pyefleet
Party	Candidate	Votes	%	±%
Conservative	A. Parsonson	562	75.0	+4.5
Labour	J. Jopling	187	25.0	−4.5
Majority		375	50.0	+9.0
Turnout		749	61.2	+24.6
Registered electors		1,231		
Conservative hold		Swing	▲4.5	

=== Shrub End ===
Shrub End
Party	Candidate	Votes	%
Labour	L. Woodrow	939	41.6
Labour	Frank Wilkin	881	39.1
Labour	E. Plowright	866	38.4
Conservative	I. Davis	547	24.3
Conservative	C. Barritt	515	22.8
Conservative	C. Crossley	498	22.1
Turnout		2,255	47.3
Registered electors		4,760	
Labour win (new seat)			
Labour win (new seat)			
Labour win (new seat)			

=== St. Andrew's ===
St. Andrew's
Party	Candidate	Votes	%
Labour	A. Leighton	1,345	77.3
Labour	D. Braddy	1,116	64.1
Labour	Graham Bober	1,068	61.3
Conservative	J. Duke	516	29.6
Conservative	V. Watts	476	27.3
Conservative	G. Stubbs	470	27.0
Turnout		1,741	31.9
Registered electors		5,456	
Labour win (new seat)			
Labour win (new seat)			
Labour win (new seat)			

=== St. Anne's ===
St. Anne's
Party	Candidate	Votes	%
Labour	Mary Frank	771	50.6
Labour	J. Fraser	753	49.4
Labour	G. Cooper	717	47.0
Conservative	W. Falk	636	41.7
Conservative	A. Dunlop	635	41.7
Conservative	A. Richardson	629	41.3
Turnout		1,524	38.1
Registered electors		4,001	
Labour win (new seat)			
Labour win (new seat)			
Labour win (new seat)			

=== St. John's ===
St. John's
Party	Candidate	Votes	%
Conservative	C. Diggens	1,112	68.5
Conservative	B. West	1,041	64.1
Conservative	M. Pinnock	1,031	63.5
Labour	P. Treacher	522	32.1
Turnout		1,624	49.1
Registered electors		3,308	
Conservative win (new seat)			
Conservative win (new seat)			
Conservative win (new seat)			

=== St. Mary's ===
St. Mary's
Party	Candidate	Votes	%
Conservative	J. Brooks	1,582	62.5
Conservative	R. Spendlove	1,348	53.2
Conservative	R. Hilham	1,264	49.9
Labour	Tim Oxton	564	22.3
Liberal	Martin Hunt	536	21.2
Liberal	A. Spyvee	534	21.1
Liberal	L. Baker	508	20.1
Turnout		2,532	50.8
Registered electors		4,985	
Conservative win (new seat)			
Conservative win (new seat)			
Conservative win (new seat)			

=== Stanway ===
Stanway
Party	Candidate	Votes	%
Conservative	T. Claydon	1,008	53.7
Conservative	P. Holloway	993	52.9
Conservative	D. Arrondelle	964	51.4
Labour	E. Kirkby	797	42.5
Labour	J. Knight	772	41.2
Labour	K. Rodgers	652	34.8
Turnout		1,876	52.2
Registered electors		3,593	
Conservative gain from Labour			
Conservative gain from Labour			
Conservative win (new seat)			

=== Tiptree ===
Tiptree
Party	Candidate	Votes	%
Residents	A. Garrod	1,006	41.1
Conservative	C. Cansdale	1,005	41.0
Residents	J. Webb	966	39.4
Residents	D. Burke	883	36.1
Conservative	R. Martin	869	35.5
Conservative	J. Lawrence	743	30.3
Labour	B. Jones	566	23.1
Turnout		2,449	46.9
Registered electors		5,221	
Residents win (new seat)			
Conservative win (new seat)			
Residents win (new seat)			

=== West Bergholt ===
West Bergholt
Party	Candidate	Votes	%	±%
Conservative	J. Lampon	662	81.5	+15.0
Labour	T. Fleet	86	10.6	−9.9
Liberal	M. Livermore	64	7.9	N/A
Majority		576	70.9	+24.8
Turnout		812	47.4	+2.0
Registered electors		1,721		
Conservative hold		Swing	▲12.5	

=== West Mersea ===
West Mersea
Party	Candidate	Votes	%
Conservative	A. Gray	1,439	76.6
Conservative	J. Williams	1,285	68.4
Conservative	G. Roberts	1,238	65.9
Independent	A. Smith	518	27.6
Labour	C. Barrett	202	10.8
Turnout		1,879	46.7
Registered electors		4,024	
Conservative hold			
Conservative gain from Independent			
Conservative hold			

=== Winstree ===
Winstree
Party	Candidate	Votes	%	±%
Conservative	M. Fairhead	823	72.8	+12.4
Labour	S. McAndrew	266	23.5	−0.6
Independent	W. Judge	42	3.7	N/A
Majority		557	49.3	+13.1
Turnout		1,131	60.6	−6.5
Registered electors		1,875		
Conservative hold		Swing	▲6.5	

=== Wivenhoe ===
Wivenhoe
Party	Candidate	Votes	%
Conservative	D. Wilkinson	1,009	51.6
Conservative	B. Grasby	905	46.3
Conservative	K. Brereton	816	41.7
Labour	G. Davies	773	39.5
Turnout		1,956	42.9
Registered electors		4,560	
Conservative hold			
Conservative hold			
Conservative gain from Labour			
