= 1986 Borders Regional Council election =

1986 Scottish local government election

Map showing results by Borders Regional Electoral District.

The 1986 Borders Regional Council election for the Borders Regional Council took place on Thursday 8 May 1986, alongside elections to the various regional councils across Scotland.

Independents won 14 of the council's 23 seats.

== Aggregate results ==
Scottish Borders Regional Council election, 1986
Party	Seats	Gains	Losses	Net gain/loss	Seats %	Votes %	Votes	+/−
Independent	13					56.69		
Conservative	6					19.40		
Alliance	2					5.23		
SNP	1					18.69		
Borders Independent	1					(incl under Ind)		
Labour	0	0	0	0	0.00	0.00		
