= 1986 Broxbourne Borough Council election =

1986 UK local government election

The Broxbourne Council election, 1986 was held to elect council members of the Broxbourne Borough Council, the local government authority of the borough of Broxbourne, Hertfordshire, England.

== Composition of expiring seats before election ==
Ward	Party	Incumbent Elected	Incumbent	Standing again?
Broxbourne	Conservative	1982	Don Smith	Yes
Bury Green	Conservative	1983	Brian Creamer	Yes
Cheshunt Central	Conservative	1982	George Batchelor	Yes
Cheshunt North	Conservative	1982	Don Poole	Yes
Flamstead End	Conservative	1985	Gordon Greenwood	No
Goffs Oak	Conservative	1982	Marie Dowsett	Yes
Hoddesdon North	Conservative	1982	James Grethe	Yes
Hoddesdon Town	Conservative	1982	R Woolfe	No
Rosedale	SDP-Liberal Alliance	1982	Jean Paice	No
Rye Park	Conservative	1982	A Roberts	No
Theobalds	Conservative	1982	Herbert Collins	Yes
Waltham Cross North	Conservative	1982	Norman Ames	Yes
Waltham Cross South	Labour	1982	J Shipp	No
Wormley & Turnford	Conservative	1982	Brian Hill	Yes

== Election results ==
Broxbourne local election result 1986
Party	Seats	Gains	Losses	Net gain/loss	Seats %	Votes %	Votes	+/−
Conservative	11	0	1	-1	78.57	47.17	10,828	
Labour	2	1	0	+1	14.29	27.26	6,259	
Alliance	1	0	0	0	7.14	25.57	5,871	

== Results summary ==
An election was held in 14 wards on 8 May 1986.

The Conservative Party lost one seat to the Labour Party in Rye Park Ward

The political balance of the council following this election was:

- Conservative 32 seats
- Labour 6 seats
- SDP-Liberal Alliance 4 Seats

== Ward results ==
Broxbourne Ward Result 8 May 1986
Party	Candidate	Votes	%	±%
Conservative	Don Smith	1,088	51.01	
Alliance	Ronald Jones	847	39.71	
Labour	David May	198	9.28	
Majority		241		
Turnout		2,133	39.50	
Conservative hold		Swing		

Bury Green Ward Result 8 May 1986
Party	Candidate	Votes	%	±%
Conservative	Brian Creamer	991	41.68	
Labour	Paul Spychal	981	41.25	
Alliance	Kenneth King	406	17.07	
Majority		10		
Turnout		2,378	42.10	
Conservative hold		Swing		

Cheshunt Central Ward Result 8 May 1986
Party	Candidate	Votes	%	±%
Conservative	George Batchelor	846	54.48	
Alliance	Peter Huse	433	27.88	
Labour	Joan Saggs	274	17.64	
Majority		413		
Turnout		1,553	43.30	
Conservative hold		Swing		

Cheshunt North Ward Result 8 May 1986
Party	Candidate	Votes	%	±%
Conservative	Don Poole	785	47.43	
Labour	Peter Alford	563	34.02	
Alliance	William Hanbury	307	18.55	
Majority		222		
Turnout		1,655	35.20	
Conservative hold		Swing		

Flamstead End Ward Result 8 May 1986
Party	Candidate	Votes	%	±%
Conservative	Edward Rowlands	954	48.47	
Alliance	Malcolm Aitken	599	30.44	
Labour	Roy Jordan	415	21.09	
Majority		355		
Turnout		1,968	42.20	
Conservative hold		Swing		

Goffs Oak Ward Result 8 May 1986
Party	Candidate	Votes	%	±%
Conservative	Marie Dowsett	882	65.43	
Alliance	Paul Collins	353	26.19	
Labour	Stephen Kingsmill	113	8.38	
Majority		529		
Turnout		1,348	42.00	
Conservative hold		Swing		

Hoddesdon North Ward Result 8 May 1986
Party	Candidate	Votes	%	±%
Conservative	James Grethe	1,014	56.58	
Alliance	Patricia Waughray	457	25.50	
Labour	Jill Garrett	321	17.92	
Majority		557		
Turnout		1,792	36.90	
Conservative hold		Swing		

Hoddesdon Town Ward Result 8 May 1986
Party	Candidate	Votes	%	±%
Conservative	Michael Lavender	807	44.05	
Alliance	Anthoney Fey	753	41.10	
Labour	Michael Velasco	272	14.85	
Majority		54		
Turnout		1,832	38.80	
Conservative hold		Swing		

Rosedale Ward Result 8 May 1986
Party	Candidate	Votes	%	±%
Alliance	James Emslie	306	37.23	
Conservative	John Smith	302	36.74	
Labour	Arthur Warner	214	26.03	
Majority		4		
Turnout		822	34.00	
Alliance hold		Swing		

Rye Park Ward Result 8 May 1986
Party	Candidate	Votes	%	±%
Labour	Bob King	947	47.09	
Conservative	William Woodhams	745	37.05	
Alliance	Michael Young	319	15.86	
Majority		202		
Turnout		2,011	43.70	
Labour gain from Conservative		Swing		

Theobalds Ward Result 8 May 1986
Party	Candidate	Votes	%	±%
Conservative	Herbert Collins	692	47.04	
Labour	John Brown	462	31.41	
Alliance	Lesley Dines	317	21.55	
Majority		230		
Turnout		1,471	36.70	
Conservative hold		Swing		

Waltham Cross North Ward Result 8 May 1986
Party	Candidate	Votes	%	±%
Conservative	Norman Ames	630	50.44	
Labour	Graham Knight	366	29.30	
Alliance	Anthoney Stokes	253	20.26	
Majority		264	39.30	
Turnout		1,249		
Conservative hold		Swing		

Waltham Cross South Ward Result 8 May 1986
Party	Candidate	Votes	%	±%
Labour	Henry Lucas	757	51.32	
Conservative	Alexander Rafferty	444	30.10	
Alliance	Walter Riley	274	18.58	
Majority		313		
Turnout		1,475	37.70	
Labour hold		Swing		

Wormley / Turnford Ward Result 8 May 1986
Party	Candidate	Votes	%	±%
Conservative	Brian Hill	648	50.99	
Labour	Roy Wareham	376	29.58	
Alliance	Laura Williams	247	19.43	
Majority		272		
Turnout		1,271	28.20	
Conservative hold		Swing		
