= 1986 City of Bradford Metropolitan District Council election =

1986 UK local government election

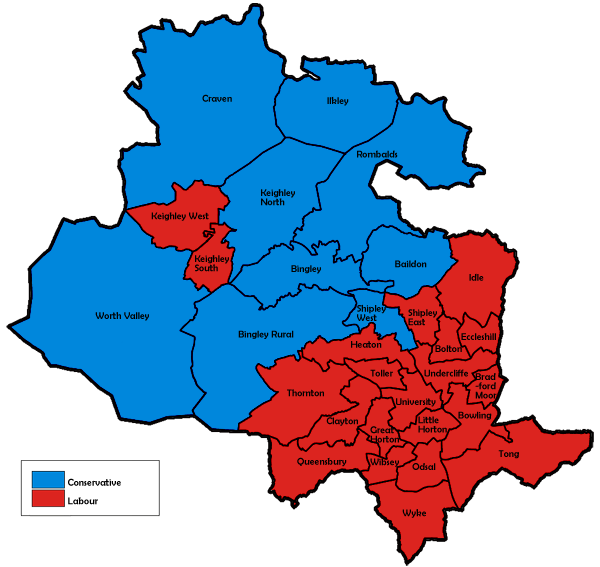
Map of the results for the 1986 Bradford council election.

The 1986 City of Bradford Metropolitan District Council elections were held on Thursday, 8 May 1986, with one third of the council and a vacancy in Odsal to be elected. The elections resulted in Labour gaining control of the council.

== Election result ==
Bradford local election result 1986
Party	Seats	Gains	Losses	Net gain/loss	Seats %	Votes %	Votes	+/−
Labour	22	11	0	+11	71.0	44.6	64,440	-0.3
Conservative	9	2	9	-7	29.0	34.9	50,350	-3.7
Alliance	0	0	4	-4	0.0	19.9	28,741	+3.5
Green	0	0	0	0	0.0	0.2	324	+0.2
Independent	0	0	0	0	0.0	0.2	240	+0.2
Revolutionary Communist	0	0	0	0	0.0	0.1	158	+0.1
BNP	0	0	0	0	0.0	0.1	139	+0.1

This result had the following consequences for the total number of seats on the council after the elections:

Party	Previous council	New council
Labour	40	51
Conservatives	44	37
Alliance	6	2
Total	90	90
Working majority	-10	12

== Ward results ==
Baildon
Party	Candidate	Votes	%	±%
Conservative	C. Charlesworth	3,014	48.9	+11.4
Alliance (Liberal)	K. Greenwood	1,876	30.4	−18.6
Labour	R. Baxter	1,092	17.7	+4.2
Green	C. Harris	185	3.0	+3.0
Majority		1,138	18.4	+7.0
Turnout		6,167		
Conservative gain from Alliance		Swing	+15.0	

Bingley
Party	Candidate	Votes	%	±%
Conservative	W. Nunn	2,255	44.5	−4.4
Labour	Y. Tough	1,805	35.6	+5.7
Alliance (Liberal)	S. Whitehead	1,005	19.8	−1.3
Majority		450	8.9	−10.1
Turnout		5,065		
Conservative hold		Swing	-5.0	

Bingley Rural
Party	Candidate	Votes	%	±%
Conservative	E. Eaton	2,673	51.7	−5.2
Labour	J. Leitch	1,280	24.7	+1.2
Alliance (Liberal)	B. Parker	1,218	23.5	+4.0
Majority		1,393	26.9	−6.4
Turnout		5,171		
Conservative hold		Swing	-3.2	

Bolton
Party	Candidate	Votes	%	±%
Labour	M. Young	1,690	37.7	+1.1
Conservative	F. Lee	1,504	33.6	−9.5
Alliance (SDP)	C. Hare	1,283	28.7	+8.4
Majority		186	4.1	−2.4
Turnout		4,477		
Labour gain from Conservative		Swing	+5.3	

Bowling
Party	Candidate	Votes	%	±%
Labour	M. Walters	3,021	68.8	−4.3
Conservative	M. Siddique	690	15.7	−11.3
Alliance (SDP)	G. Beacher	682	15.5	+15.5
Majority		2,331	53.1	+7.0
Turnout		4,393		
Labour hold		Swing	+3.5	

Bradford Moor
Party	Candidate	Votes	%	±%
Labour	R. Billheimer	3,091	67.9	+4.7
Conservative	H. Gill	926	20.4	−5.6
Alliance (SDP)	E. Hallmann	532	11.7	+0.9
Majority		2,165	47.6	+10.3
Turnout		4,549		
Labour hold		Swing	+5.1	

Clayton
Party	Candidate	Votes	%	±%
Labour	G. Mitchell	2,344	45.8	−2.2
Conservative	G. Seager	2,024	39.6	−0.2
Alliance (SDP)	S. Illingworth	747	14.6	+2.5
Majority		320	6.3	−2.0
Turnout		5,115		
Labour gain from Conservative		Swing	-1.0	

Craven
Party	Candidate	Votes	%	±%
Conservative	E. Dawson	2,021	39.5	−4.0
Alliance (Liberal)	R. Binns	2,018	39.4	+2.7
Labour	A. Smith	1,076	21.0	+1.2
Majority		3	0.1	−6.7
Turnout		5,115		
Conservative gain from Alliance		Swing	-3.3	

Eccleshill
Party	Candidate	Votes	%	±%
Labour	M. Millgate	2,004	46.1	+0.1
Conservative	S. Swallow	1,272	29.3	−7.2
Alliance (Liberal)	J. Taylor	803	18.5	+1.1
Independent	D. Willoughby	189	4.3	+4.3
BNP	G. Robinson	74	1.7	+1.7
Majority		732	16.9	+7.3
Turnout		4,342		
Labour gain from Conservative		Swing	+3.6	

Great Horton
Party	Candidate	Votes	%	±%
Labour	S. Collard	2,504	53.2	−0.6
Conservative	J. Beeson	1,493	31.7	−4.8
Alliance (SDP)	R. Dowson	708	15.0	+5.4
Majority		1,011	21.5	+4.1
Turnout		4,705		
Labour gain from Conservative		Swing	+2.1	

Heaton
Party	Candidate	Votes	%	±%
Labour	C. James	2,400	42.2	+13.6
Conservative	C. Hobson	2,317	40.8	−19.2
Alliance (SDP)	J. Hewitt	931	16.4	+5.0
Revolutionary Communist	J. Bahr	35	0.6	+0.6
Majority		83	1.5	−29.9
Turnout		5,683		
Labour gain from Conservative		Swing	+16.4	

Idle
Party	Candidate	Votes	%	±%
Labour	J. Fosse	1,404	33.4	+2.2
Conservative	H. Lytchett	1,369	32.6	+0.1
Alliance (Liberal)	I. Horner	1,314	31.3	−5.0
BNP	B. Coupe	65	1.5	+1.5
Independent	A. Cribb	51	1.2	+1.2
Majority		35	0.8	−3.0
Turnout		4,203		
Labour gain from Alliance		Swing	+1.0	

Ilkley
Party	Candidate	Votes	%	±%
Conservative	B. Cussons	2,739	48.0	−5.2
Alliance (Liberal)	R. Battey	2,213	38.8	+1.7
Labour	R. Fox	756	13.2	+3.5
Majority		526	9.2	−6.8
Turnout		5,708		
Conservative hold		Swing	-3.4	

Keighley North
Party	Candidate	Votes	%	±%
Conservative	K. Metcalfe	2,256	40.3	+0.1
Labour	L. Ali	1,889	33.7	−13.3
Alliance (SDP)	P. Panteli	1,453	26.0	+13.1
Majority		367	6.6	−0.3
Turnout		5,598		
Conservative hold		Swing	+6.7	

Keighley South
Party	Candidate	Votes	%	±%
Labour	A. Rye	2,913	70.5	+4.4
Conservative	D. Lynas	669	16.2	−4.7
Alliance (SDP)	J. Arnold	548	13.3	+0.3
Majority		2,244	54.3	+9.2
Turnout		4,130		
Labour hold		Swing	+4.5	

Keighley West
Party	Candidate	Votes	%	±%
Labour	P. Beeley	2,521	49.6	−2.7
Conservative	E. Owens	1,567	30.8	−2.3
Alliance (Liberal)	S. Green	998	19.6	+5.0
Majority		954	18.8	−0.4
Turnout		5,086		
Labour hold		Swing	-0.2	

Little Horton
Party	Candidate	Votes	%	±%
Labour	K. Ryalls	2,686	72.7	+1.4
Conservative	G. Johnson	622	16.8	−2.5
Alliance (SDP)	D. Jagger	385	10.4	+1.1
Majority		2,064	55.9	+4.0
Turnout		3,693		
Labour hold		Swing	+1.9	

Odsal
Party	Candidate	Votes	%	±%
Labour	E. Johnson	2,546	51.3	+0.9
Labour	R. Martin	2,493		
Conservative	T. Hill	1,575	31.7	−0.3
Conservative	H. Thorne	1,400		
Alliance (SDP)	D. Hopkins	846	17.0	−0.6
Majority		971	19.5	+1.2
Turnout		4,967		
Labour hold		Swing		
Labour hold		Swing	+0.6	

Queensbury
Party	Candidate	Votes	%	±%
Labour	C. Warman	2,155	43.3	+1.1
Conservative	J. Rees	1,961	39.4	−5.1
Alliance (SDP)	L. Hudson	856	17.2	+4.0
Majority		194	3.9	+1.7
Turnout		4,972		
Labour gain from Conservative		Swing	+3.1	

Rombalds
Party	Candidate	Votes	%	±%
Conservative	P. Gadsby-Peet	2,738	50.6	−5.7
Alliance (SDP)	J. Ryan	1,834	33.9	+9.3
Labour	J. O'Neill	842	15.5	−3.6
Majority		904	16.7	−15.0
Turnout		5,414		
Conservative hold		Swing	-7.5	

Shipley East
Party	Candidate	Votes	%	±%
Labour	T. Miller	2,647	61.4	+4.2
Conservative	S. Newton	927	21.5	−6.1
Alliance (Liberal)	P. Britton	738	17.1	+1.9
Majority		1,720	39.9	+10.3
Turnout		4,312		
Labour hold		Swing	+5.1	

Shipley West
Party	Candidate	Votes	%	±%
Conservative	D. Heseltine	2,568	44.2	−5.9
Labour	D. Wardle	1,990	34.3	−1.3
Alliance (SDP)	M. Attenborough	1,107	19.1	+4.8
Green	S. Shepherd	139	2.4	+2.4
Majority		578	10.0	−4.6
Turnout		5,804		
Conservative hold		Swing	-2.3	

Thornton
Party	Candidate	Votes	%	±%
Labour	S. Tetley	2,151	50.9	+6.9
Conservative	D. Downey	2,073	19.1	+3.9
Majority		78	1.8	+0.7
Turnout		4,224		
Labour gain from Conservative		Swing	+1.5	

Toller
Party	Candidate	Votes	%	±%
Labour	G. Whitfield	3,039	54.9	+5.9
Conservative	V. Binney	1,803	32.6	−6.8
Alliance (SDP)	J. Brennan	691	12.5	+1.0
Majority		1,236	22.3	+12.7
Turnout		5,533		
Labour gain from Conservative		Swing	+6.3	

Tong
Party	Candidate	Votes	%	±%
Labour	D. Smith	2,088	67.2	−12.8
Conservative	K. Sotomayer-Sugden	548	17.6	−2.3
Alliance (SDP)	W. Smyth	448	14.4	+14.4
Revolutionary Communist	A. Kent	21	0.7	+0.7
Majority		1,540	49.6	−10.6
Turnout		3,105		
Labour hold		Swing	-5.2	

Undercliffe
Party	Candidate	Votes	%	±%
Labour	R. Sowman	2,538	58.3	+0.5
Conservative	D. Green	1,181	27.1	−4.0
Alliance (SDP)	I. Glenn	634	14.6	+3.5
Majority		1,357	31.2	+4.6
Turnout		4,353		
Labour hold		Swing	+2.2	

University
Party	Candidate	Votes	%	±%
Labour	M. Riaz	4,068	77.1	−1.0
Conservative	J. Austin	767	14.5	+1.5
Alliance (SDP)	M. Khan	340	6.4	+0.2
Revolutionary Communist	M. Singh	102	1.9	+1.9
Majority		3,301	62.5	−2.5
Turnout		5,277		
Labour gain from Alliance		Swing	-1.2	

Wibsey
Party	Candidate	Votes	%	±%
Labour	C. Richardson	2,060	45.3	−1.3
Conservative	E. Manogue	1,572	34.6	−16.8
Alliance (SDP)	T. Lindley	917	20.2	+20.2
Majority		488	10.7	+6.0
Turnout		4,549		
Labour gain from Conservative		Swing	+7.7	

Worth Valley
Party	Candidate	Votes	%	±%
Conservative	S. Midgley	2,125	48.0	−5.7
Labour	R. Kelly	1,520	34.3	−2.5
Alliance (Liberal)	R. Quayle	782	17.7	+8.2
Majority		605	13.7	−3.2
Turnout		4,427		
Conservative hold		Swing	-1.6	

Wyke
Party	Candidate	Votes	%	±%
Labour	D. Mangham	2,320	54.5	−0.9
Conservative	V. Owen	1,101	25.9	−1.8
Alliance (SDP)	R. Blagboro	834	19.6	+2.8
Majority		1,219	28.6	+0.9
Turnout		4,255		
Labour hold		Swing	+0.4	
