= Kirkcaldy North (ward) =

Electoral ward of Fife, Scotland

Location of the ward

Kirkcaldy North is one of the 22 wards of the Fife council in scotland. It elects three Councillors.

== Councillors ==
Election	Councillors		
2007	Carol Lindsay (SNP)	Neil Crooks (Labour)	David Ross (Labour)
2012	Carol Lindsay (SNP)	Neil Crooks (Labour)	David Ross (Labour)
2017	Carol Lindsay (SNP)	Neil Crooks (Labour)	David Ross (Labour)
2022	Carol Lindsay (SNP)	James Leslie (Conservative)	David Ross (Labour)

== Election results ==
=== 2022 Election ===
2022 Fife Council election

Kirkcaldy North - 3 seats
Party	Candidate	FPv%	Count							
Party	Candidate	FPv%	1	2	3	4	5	6	7	8
Labour	David Ross (incumbent)	34.9%	1,804							
SNP	Carol Lindsay (incumbent)	32.1%	1,661							
Conservative	James Leslie	15.2%	789	812.5	813.8	828.8	838.8	855.1	1,029.9	1,187.9
SNP	Sally Walsh	6.8%	352	360.2	669.4	672.9	710.3	821.3	936.4	
Labour	Ryan Smart (incumbent in Buckhaven, Methil and Wemyss Villages)	4.1%	213	641.3	652.4	661.1	672.6	731		
Green	Michael Collie	3.9%	204	212.5	226.9	231.2	254.1			
Alba	Craig Dempsey	2%	101	101.8	108.7	112				
UKIP	Gerald Haddrell	0.9%	45	46.1	46.6					
Electorate: 12,519 Valid: 5,169 Spoilt: 100 Quota: 1,293 Turnout: 42.1%

=== 2017 Election ===
2017 Fife Council election

Kirkcaldy North - 3 seats
Party	Candidate	FPv%	Count						
Party	Candidate	FPv%	1	2	3	4	5	6	7
Labour	Neil Crooks (incumbent)	29.4	1,486						
SNP	Carol Lindsay (incumbent)	21.3	1,076	1,085.03	1,089.2	1,129.6	1,670.4		
Conservative	James Leslie	17.7	896	906.2	938.7	967.1	972.9	991.5	
Labour	David Ross (incumbent)	14.9	757	920.4	954.8	995.4	1,013.9	1,138.7	1,553.5
SNP	Jane Glen	11.3	570	582.4	589.8	621.06			
Green	Susan Jeynes	2.9	149	152.1	183.8				
Liberal Democrats	Harald Gavin	2.5	129	135.8					
Electorate: 12,304 Valid: 5,063 Spoilt: 86 Quota: 1,266 Turnout: 5,149 (41.8%)

=== 2012 Election ===
2012 Fife Council election

Kirkcaldy North - 3 seats
Party	Candidate	FPv%	Count						
Party	Candidate	FPv%	1	2	3	4	5	6	7
Labour	Neil Crooks (incumbent)	39.38	1,739						
Labour	David Ross (incumbent)	19.11	844	1,339.8					
SNP	Carol Lindsay (incumbent)	18.03	796	829.5	855.5	880.9	890.6	938.7	1,507.6
SNP	Randall Foggie	12.55	554	588.6	607.9	617.4	626.1	676.7	
Scottish Senior Citizens	Janette Hamilton	4.87	215	242.3	292.1	322.5	407.6		
Conservative	Mark Hamid	3.71	164	168.4	174.2	201.9			
Liberal Democrats	John Mainland	2.36	104	111.7	133.6				
Electorate: 11,935 Valid: 4,416 Spoilt: 82 Quota: 1,105 Turnout: 4,498 (37.0%)

=== 2007 Election ===
2007 Fife Council election

Kirkcaldy North
Party	Candidate	FPv%	%	Seat	Count
SNP	Carol Lindsay	1,632	29.1	1	1
Labour	Neil Crooks	1,617	28.8	2	1
Labour	David Ross	977	17.4	3	5
Liberal Democrats	Les Soper	651	11.6		
Conservative	Peter Finnie	433	7.7		
Independent	Calum Addison Coulter	188	3.4		
Solidarity	Louise McLeary	109	1.9		
