= Rosyth (ward) =

Electoral ward of Fife, Scotland

Location of the ward

Rosyth is one of the 22 wards used to elect members of the Fife council. It elects three Councillors.

== Councillors ==
Election	Councillors		
2007	Douglas Chapman (SNP)	Pat Callaghan (Labour)	Keith Legg (Liberal Democrats)
2012	Douglas Chapman (SNP)	Pat Callaghan (Labour)	Mike Shirkie (Labour)
2015	Sharon Wilson (SNP)	Pat Callaghan (Labour)	Mike Shirkie (Labour)
2017	Samantha Steele (SNP)	Andrew Verrecchia (Labour)	Tony Orton (Conservative)
2019	Sharon Green-Wilson (SNP)	Andrew Verrecchia (Labour)	Tony Orton (Conservative)
2022	Brian Goodall (SNP)	Andrew Verrecchia (Labour)	Andy Jackson (SNP)

== Election results ==
=== 2022 election ===
Rosyth - 3 seats
Party	Candidate	FPv%	Count								
Party	Candidate	FPv%	1	2	3	4	5	6	7	8	9
Labour	Andrew Verrecchia (incumbent)	26.3	1,274								
SNP	Brian Goodall	22.4	1,085	1,088	1,089	1,092	1,139	1,232			
SNP	Andy Jackson	17.0	826	829	831	833	883	955	973	1,032	1,120
Conservative	Grant Thomson	16.8	813	824	830	854	871	884	884	1,000	
Liberal Democrats	Teresa Little	6.5	316	333	336	347	366	422	422		
Green	Fiona McOwan	5.2	250	254	259	268	290				
Alba	Stephen Lynas	4.0	192	194	196	203					
Scottish Family	Alastair Macintyre	1.4	69	70	77						
Scottish Libertarian	George Morton	0.5	23	23							
Electorate: 11,736 Valid: 4,848 Spoilt: 82 Quota: 1,213 Turnout: 42.0%

== Notes ==
Rosyth By-election (14 November 2019)
Party	Candidate	FPv%	Count					
Party	Candidate	FPv%	1	2	3	4	5	6
SNP	Sharon Green-Wilson	42.8%	1,347	1,347	1,406	1,429	1,486	1,639
Conservative	Margaret Fairgrieve	24.4%	768	771	774	822	885	976
Labour	Billy Pollock	15.2%	480	480	498	526	591	
Liberal Democrats	Jill Blair	7.9%	249	250	275	291		
Independent	Alastair MacIntyre	5.0%	157	162	168			
Green	Craig McCutcheon	4.2%	132	133				
Scottish Libertarian	Calum Paul	0.5%	16					
Electorate: 11,554 Quota: 1,575 Turnout: 3,149 (27.5%)

Rosyth - 3 seats
Party	Candidate	FPv%	Count								
Party	Candidate	FPv%	1	2	3	4	5	6	7	8	9
Conservative	Tony Orton	22.3	1,136	1,146	1,149	1,177	1,288				
SNP	Samantha Steele††	21.9	1,118	1,122	1,177	1,194	1,236	1,236.2	1,281.3		
Labour	Andrew Verrecchia	18.3	932	935	951	962	1,050	1,053.8	1,221.8	1,221.9	1,490.7
SNP	Sharon Wilson (incumbent)	14.6	742	742	754	766	777	777.1	830.2	835.8	
Independent	Mike Shirkie (incumbent)	7.9	402	424	434	540	609	611.9			
Liberal Democrats	Wendy Chamberlain	7.4	377	383	414	429					
Independent	Steven Leckie	3.06	156	192	207						
Green	Fiona McOwan	2.9	147	151							
Independent	Alistair MacIntyre	1.7	89								
Electorate: 11,643 Valid: 5,099 Spoilt: 52 Quota: 1,275 Turnout: 5,151 (44.2%)

Rosyth by-election (26 November 2015) - 1 seat
Party	Candidate	FPv%	Count						
Party	Candidate	FPv%	1	2	3	4	5	6	7
SNP	Sharon Wilson	45.2%	1,214	1,235	1,241	1,249	1,263	1,286	1,623
Labour	Vikki Fairweather	34.5%	926	939	950	966	1,012	1,117	
Conservative	David Ross	9.1%	245	246	256	281	309		
Liberal Democrats	Matthew Hall	3.6%	97	102	112	122			
UKIP	Colin Mitchelson	3.3%	88	90	97				
Independent	Alastair MacIntyre	2.5%	66	68					
Green	Cairinne MacDonald	1.9%	51						
Electorate: 10,985 Valid: 2,687 Spoilt: 22 Quota: 1,344 Turnout: 2,709 (24.66%)

Rosyth - 3 seats
Party	Candidate	FPv%	Count						
Party	Candidate	FPv%	1	2	3	4	5	6	7
SNP	Douglas Chapman (incumbent)	27.84	1,076						
Labour	Pat Callaghan (incumbent)	27.14	1,049						
Labour	Mike Shirkie	20.54	794	798.1	865	881.6	896.5	930.9	1,044.9
SNP	Simon Tate	7.92	306	396.5	398.2	404.6	415.3	433.2	510.3
Liberal Democrats	Audrey Dunsmore	7.12	275	279.2	283.1	287.1	305.3	411.4	
Conservative	Ian Dempsey	5.77	223	224.8	225.9	227.9	260.9		
UKIP	Alastair MacIntyre	2.61	101	103.2	104.6	110.6			
Independent	Jason McGilvray	1.06	41	41.9	42.7				
Electorate: 10,875 Valid: 3,865 Spoilt: 54 Quota: 967 Turnout: 3,924 (35.54%)

Rosyth
Party	Candidate	FPv%	%	Seat	Count
SNP	Douglas Chapman	1,672	32.1	1	1
Labour	Pat Callaghan	1,579	30.3	2	1
Liberal Democrats	Keith Legg	1,081	20.8	3	3
Labour	Malcolm Macaulay	456	8.8		
Conservative	Richard McKell	415	8.0		
