= Leven, Kennoway and Largo (ward) =

Electoral ward of Fife, Scotland

Location of the ward

Leven, Kennoway and Largo is one of the 22 wards used to elect members of the Fife council. It elects four Councillors.

== Councillors ==
Election	Councillors			
2007	David Alexander (SNP)	Alistair Hunter (SNP)	Charles Haffey (Labour)	Marilyn Whitehead (Liberal Democrats)
2012	David Alexander (SNP)	Alistair Hunter (SNP)	Charles Haffey (Labour)	Tom Adams (Labour)
2016	David Alexander (SNP)	Alistair Suttie (SNP)	Charles Haffey (Labour)	Tom Adams (Labour)
2017	David Alexander (SNP)	Alistair Suttie (SNP)	Colin Davidson (Labour)	Graham Ritchie (Conservative)
2022	David Alexander (SNP)	Alistair Suttie (SNP)	Colin Davidson (Labour)	Eugene Clarke (Liberal Democrats)

== Election results ==
=== 2022 Election ===
2022 Fife Council election

Leven, Kennoway and Largo - 4 seats
Party	Candidate	FPv%	Count		
Party	Candidate	FPv%	1	2	3
SNP	David Alexander (incumbent)	31.7%	2,077		
Labour	Colin Davidson (incumbent)	20.6%	1,348		
Liberal Democrats	Eugene Clarke	19.3%	1,268	1,307.8	1,312.5
SNP	Alistair Suttie (incumbent)	10.8%	707	1,323.2	
Conservative	Graham Ritchie (incumbent)	10.4%	683	686.7	688.5
Labour	Jacob Winton	4.1%	271	287.2	310.9
Green	Iain Morrice	2.4%	156	199.5	200.3
Scottish Family	Davina Saunders	0.7%	49	52.7	53
Electorate: 15,245 Valid: 6,559 Spoilt: 128 Quota: 1,312 Turnout: 43.9%

=== 2017 Election ===
2017 Fife Council election

Leven, Kennoway and Largo - 4 seats
Party	Candidate	FPv%	Count							
Party	Candidate	FPv%	1	2	3	4	5	6	7	8
SNP	David Alexander (incumbent)	23.6	1,506							
Conservative	Graham Ritchie	21.02	1,339							
SNP	Alistair Suttie (incumbent)	15.7	1,002	1,194.9	1,196.2	1,204.9	1,256.9	1,348.9		
Labour	Colin Davidson	13.9	885	892.9	900.7	902.6	913.5	1,109.7	1,124.09	1,972.9
Labour	Tom Adams (incumbent)	13.7	872	879.09	883.7	886.9	901.2	988.6	1,001.2	
Liberal Democrats	Steve Wood	9.8	625	628.2	652.9	656.3	687.6			
Green	Iain Morrice	1.8	115	122.09	124.3	127.6				
Solidarity	Craig Duncan	0.39	25	27.5	28.3					
Electorate: 14,841 Valid: 6,369 Spoilt: 122 Quota: 1,274 Turnout: 6,491 (43.7%)

=== 2016 By-election ===
A by election was called after Alistair Hunter resigned his seat ahead of his emigration to Australia.

Leven, Kennoway and Largo by-election (15 December 2016) - 1 seat
Party	Candidate	FPv%	Count				
Party	Candidate	FPv%	1	2	3	4	5
SNP	Alistair Suttie	36.95%	1,501	1,532	1,615	1,668	2,214
Labour	Colin Davidson	28.43%	1,155	1,169	1,302	1,620	
Conservative	Graham Ritchie	18.51%	752	754	954		
Liberal Democrats	Steve Wood	14.28%	580	590			
Green	Iain Morrice	1.82%	74				
Valid: 4,062 Spoilt: 28 Quota: 2,032 Turnout: 4,090 (27.6%)

=== 2012 Election ===
2012 Fife Council election

Leven, Kennoway and Largo - 4 seats
Party	Candidate	FPv%	Count							
Party	Candidate	FPv%	1	2	3	4	5	6	7	8
SNP	David Alexander (incumbent)	23.40	1,383							
Labour	Charles Haffey (incumbent)	19.08	1,128	1,136.5	1,150.5	1,170.7	1,254.1			
Labour	Tom Adams	16.21	958	963.6	967.2	990.4	1,056.1	1,115.3	1,123.3	1,287.7
SNP	Alistair Hunter (incumbent) †^{13}	12.59	744	856.9	1,149.1	1,177.3	1,239.7			
Liberal Democrats	Christopher Trotter	9.96	589	592.3	602.5	747	843.6	846.1	851.8	
Scottish Senior Citizens	Joe Cochrane	6.92	409	417.9	427.1	503.8				
Conservative	Dave Mole	6.80	402	404.3	407.3					
SNP	Alistair Suttie	5.04	298	347.7						
Electorate: 14,903 Valid: 5,911 Spoilt: 36 Quota: 1,183 Turnout: 6,006 (40.30%)

=== 2007 Election ===
2007 Fife Council election

Leven, Kennoway and Largo
Party	Candidate	FPv%	%	Seat	Count
SNP	David Alexander	2,164	29.6	1	1
Labour	Charles Haffey	1,676	22.9	2	1
Liberal Democrats	Marilyn Whitehead	1,118	15.3	4	5
SNP	Alistair Hunter	880	12.0	3	5
Conservative	Bill Brooks	799	10.9		
Labour	Vincent Heneghan	578	7.9		
UKIP	Rab Hutchison	89	1.4		
