= Kirkcaldy Central (ward) =

Electoral ward of Fife, Scotland

Location of the ward

Kirkcaldy Central is one of the 22 wards used to elect members of the Fife council. It elects three Councillors.

== Councillors ==
Election	Councillors		
2007	David Torrance (SNP)	Judy Hamilton (Labour)	Alice Sopar (Liberal Democrats)
2012	Stuart MacPhail (SNP)	Judy Hamilton (Labour)	Kenny Selbie (Labour)
2017	Zoe Hisbent (SNP)	Judy Hamilton (Labour)	Alistair Cameron (Labour)
2022	Blair Allan (SNP)	Judy Hamilton (Labour)	Alistair Cameron (Labour)

== Election results ==
=== 2022 Election ===
2022 Fife Council election

Kirkcaldy Central - 3 seats
Party	Candidate	FPv%	Count						
Party	Candidate	FPv%	1	2	3	4	5	6	7
SNP	Blair Allan	22%	1,005	1,010	1,047	1,064	1,069.3	1,071	1,800.3
Labour	Alistair Cameron (incumbent)	21.6%	984	1,004	1,030	1,186			
Labour	Judy Hamilton (incumbent)	20%	915	938	977	1,158			
SNP	Zoe Hisbent (incumbent)	15.8%	723	725	800	809	813.1	815.6	
Conservative	Graham Duncan	13.6%	619	642	652				
Green	Tao Macleod	4.4%	203	224					
Liberal Democrats	Karen Utting	2.5%	115						
Electorate: 11,394 Valid: 4,564 Spoilt: 106 Quota: 1,142 Turnout: 41%

=== 2017 Election ===
2017 Fife Council election

Kirkcaldy Central - 3 seats
Party	Candidate	FPv%	Count							
Party	Candidate	FPv%	1	2	3	4	5	6	7	8
SNP	Zoe Hisbent	23.3	1,138	1,139	1,148	1,162	1,218	1,740		
Labour	Alastair Cameron	18.4	898	898	930	962	995	1,020	1,108.8	1,328.4
Conservative	Dorothy Ross	17.7	865	867	888	914	930	932	948.7	
Labour	Judy Hamilton (incumbent)	17.3	845	847	865	887	940	981	1,069.8	1,257.9
SNP	Maciej Wiczynski	12.5	610	611	614	624	670			
Green	Cairinne MacDonald	4.6	223	226	249	279				
Independent	Daniel Penman	3.0	145	148	163					
Liberal Democrats	Tricia Dakers	2.8	138	140						
Scottish Libertarian	Calum Paul	0.33	16							
Electorate: 11,449 Valid: 4,878 Spoilt: 113 Quota: 1,220 Turnout: 4,991 (43.6%)

=== 2012 Election ===
2012 Fife Council election

Kirkcaldy Central - 3 seats
Party	Candidate	FPv%	Count				
Party	Candidate	FPv%	1	2	3	4	5
Labour	Judy Hamilton (incumbent)	36.55	1,534				
SNP	Stuart Macphail	20.75	871	906.3	922.9	1,340.9	
Labour	Kenny Selbie	13.70	575	948.2	988.3	1,016.1	1,084.3
SNP	Iain Wallace	11.65	489	496.6	510.9		
Liberal Democrats	Alice Soper (incumbent)	10.08	423	440.4	566.6	592.9	
Conservative	Dorothy Ross	7.27	305	313.5			
Electorate: 11,565 Valid: 4,197 Spoilt: 65 Quota: 1,050 Turnout: 4,262 (36.29%)

=== 2007 Election ===
2007 Fife Council election

Kirkcaldy Central
Party	Candidate	FPv%	%	Seat	Count
SNP	David Torrance	1,795	31.8	1	1
Labour	Judy Hamilton	1,227	21.8	3	4
Liberal Democrats	Alice Soper	1,075	19.1	2	4
Labour	John G Mackenzie	965	17.1		
Conservative	Susan McCulloch	462	8.2		
Solidarity	Steve West	114	2.0		
