= Glenrothes West and Kinglassie (ward) =

Electoral ward of Fife, Scotland

Location of the ward

Glenrothes West and Kinglassie is one of the 22 wards used to elect members of the Fife council. It elects three Councillors.

== Councillors ==
| Election | Councillors | | | |
|---|---|---|---|---|
| 2007 | Peter Grant (SNP) | Alf Patey (SNP) | Raymond Duguid (Labour) | Betty Campbell (Labour) |
| 2012 | Peter Grant (SNP) | Bill Brown (SNP/ Ind.) | Altany Craig (Labour) | Betty Campbell (Labour) |
| 2015 | Craig Walker (SNP) | Bill Brown (SNP/ Ind.) | Altany Craig (Labour) | Julie Ford (SNP) |
| 2017 | Craig Walker (SNP) | 3 seats | Altany Craig (Labour) | Julie Ford (SNP) |
| 2022 | Craig Walker (SNP) | 3 seats | Altany Craig (Labour) | Julie Ford (SNP) |
| 2026 by-election | Craig Walker (SNP) | 3 seats | Altany Craig (Labour) | Zoe Hisbent (SNP) |

== Election results ==
=== 2026 by-election ===
Glenrothes West and Kinglassie by-election (22 January 2026) - 1 seat
| Party | Candidate | FPv% | Count | | | | |
| Party | Candidate | FPv% | 1 | 2 | 3 | 4 | 5 |
|---|---|---|---|---|---|---|---|
| SNP | Zoe Hisbent | 43.8 | 1,167 | 1,171 | 1,201 | 1,225 | 1,382 |
| Reform | Romano Valente | 27.2 | 725 | 730 | 741 | 787 | 834 |
| Labour | Jacob Winton | 15.5 | 413 | 417 | 452 | 496 | |
| Conservative | Andrew Butchart | 6.8 | 182 | 183 | 202 | | |
| Liberal Democrats | Ed Scotcher | 4.7 | 125 | 129 | | | |
| Scottish Family | Danny Smith | 0.9 | 25 | | | | |
Electorate: 12,043 Valid: 2,637 Spoilt: 26 Quota: 1,319 Turnout: 22.1%

=== 2022 election ===
2022 Fife Council election

Glenrothes West and Kinglassie - 3 seats
| Party | Candidate | FPv% | Count | | | | |
| Party | Candidate | FPv% | 1 | 2 | 3 | 4 | 5 |
|---|---|---|---|---|---|---|---|
| SNP | Julie Ford (incumbent) | 37.9% | 1,740 | | | | |
| Labour | Altany Craik (incumbent) | 32.5% | 1,491 | | | | |
| SNP | Craig Walker (incumbent) | 11.6% | 533 | 1,059.7 | 1,104.3 | 1,138.2 | 1,186.9 |
| Conservative | David Croll | 11.6% | 531 | 537.5 | 613.6 | 639.7 | 745 |
| Liberal Democrats | Keith Smith | 3.8% | 174 | 182.2 | 275.1 | 327.6 | |
| Independent | Ian Robertson | 2.6% | 119 | 128.9 | 163.6 | | |
Electorate: 12,068 Valid: 4,588 Spoilt: 103 Quota: 1,148 Turnout: 38.9%

=== 2017 Election ===
2017 Fife Council election

Glenrothes West and Kinglassie - 3 seats
| Party | Candidate | FPv% | Count | | | | | | | |
| Party | Candidate | FPv% | 1 | 2 | 3 | 4 | 5 | 6 | 7 | 8 |
|---|---|---|---|---|---|---|---|---|---|---|
| SNP | Julie Ford (incumbent) | 30.2 | 1,442 | | | | | | | |
| Labour | Altany Craik (incumbent) | 26.2 | 1,252 | | | | | | | |
| Conservative | David Croll | 15.2 | 723 | 726.09 | 735.08 | 757.5 | 762.9 | 788.3 | 945.08 | |
| SNP | Craig Walker (incumbent) | 13.8 | 659 | 873.9 | 879.5 | 887.7 | 918.9 | 933.8 | 1,061.6 | 1,182.2 |
| Independent | Bill Brown (incumbent) | 9.6 | 460 | 465.3 | 477.9 | 491.6 | 514.9 | 548.4 | | |
| Green | Lewis Campbell | 1.8 | 87 | 93.5 | 96.2 | 99.8 | | | | |
| Liberal Democrats | Derek Preston | 1.8 | 86 | 88.2 | 97.04 | 105.5 | 117.3 | | | |
| UKIP | Martin Green | 1.3 | 63 | 65.9 | 67.9 | | | | | |
Electorate: 11,840 Valid: 4,772 Spoilt: 70 Quota: 1,194 Turnout: 4,842 (40%)

=== October 2015 By-election ===
A by-election was called after Peter Grant resigned his seat, having been elected MP for Glenrothes

Glenrothes West and Kinglassie by-election (1 October 2015) - 1 seat
| Party | Candidate | FPv% | Count |
| Party | Candidate | FPv% | 1 |
|---|---|---|---|
| SNP | Julie Ford | 58.99% | 2,235 |
| Labour | Alan Seath | 31.86% | 1,207 |
| Conservative | Jonathan Gray | 6.18% | 234 |
| Green | Lorna Ross | 2.98% | 113 |
Electorate: 13,910 Valid: 3,789 Quota: 1,895 Turnout: 27.1%

=== March 2015 By-election ===
A by-election was called after Betty Campbell died.

Glenrothes West and Kinglassie by-election (26 March 2015) - 1 seat
| Party | Candidate | FPv% | Count |
| Party | Candidate | FPv% | 1 |
|---|---|---|---|
| SNP | Craig Walker | 55.3 | 2,539 |
| Labour | Alan Seath | 35.8 | 1,643 |
| Conservative | John Wheatley | 4.4 | 202 |
| UKIP | Martin Green | 3.2 | 146 |
| Liberal Democrats | Jane Ann Liston | 1.3 | 61 |
Valid: 4,591 Turnout: 32.59

=== 2012 Election ===
2012 Fife Council election

Glenrothes West and Kinglassie - 4 seats
| Party | Candidate | FPv% | Count | | | | | | | |
| Party | Candidate | FPv% | 1 | 2 | 3 | 4 | 5 | 6 | 7 | 8 |
|---|---|---|---|---|---|---|---|---|---|---|
| Labour | Betty Campbell (incumbent) †^{06} | 27.49 | 1,424 | | | | | | | |
| SNP | Peter Grant (incumbent) †^{09} | 18.17 | 941 | 948.9 | 958.2 | 959.2 | 966.5 | 975.5 | 1,018.8 | 1,263.2 |
| SNP | Bill Brown †^{08} | 17.57 | 910 | 921.9 | 931.2 | 932.5 | 945.7 | 956 | 972.4 | 1,064.7 |
| Labour | Altany Craig | 13.67 | 708 | 1,034.9 | 1,051.5 | | | | | |
| SNP | Craig Walker | 6.74 | 349 | 350.4 | 351.4 | 351.6 | 353.9 | 356.9 | 368.9 | |
| Scottish Senior Citizens | Claire Dawson | 5.23 | 271 | 283.2 | 291.8 | 294.5 | 310.1 | 371 | 478.1 | 488.6 |
| Independent | Robert James Taylor | 3.71 | 192 | 196.3 | 202.3 | 203.2 | 290.5 | 318.8 | | |
| Conservative | Patricia Irvine | 2.99 | 155 | 156.9 | 169.2 | 169.5 | 170.8 | | | |
| Independent | Ian Robertson | 2.84 | 147 | 149.9 | 158.3 | 159.3 | | | | |
| Liberal Democrats | Cathy Adamson | 1.60 | 83 | 85.2 | | | | | | |
Electorate: 13,711 Valid: 5,180 Spoilt: 75 Quota: 1,037 Turnout: 5,255 (37.78%)

=== 2007 Election ===
2007 Fife Council election

Glenrothes West and Kinglassie
| Party | Candidate | FPv% | % | Seat | Count |
|---|---|---|---|---|---|
| SNP | Peter Grant | 1,835 | 28.4 | 1 | 1 |
| Labour | Betty Campbell | 1,627 | 25.2 | 2 | 1 |
| SNP | Alf Patey | 1,278 | 19.8 | 3 | 2 |
| Labour | Raymond Duguid | 585 | 9.1 | 4 | 6 |
| Conservative | David Paterson Croll | 384 | 5.9 | | |
| Independent | Bob Taylor | 376 | 5.8 | | |
| Liberal Democrats | David Riches | 369 | 5.7 | | |
