= Glenrothes Central and Thornton (ward) =

Electoral ward in Fife, Scotland

Location of the ward

Glenrothes Central and Thornton is one of the 22 wards used to elect members of the Fife council. It elects three Councillors.

== Councillors ==
Election	Councillors		
2007	Ross Vettraino (SNP)	Dave Cunningham (SNP)	Ian Crichton (Labour)
2012	Ross Vettraino (SNP)	Ian Sloane (Labour)	Ian Crichton (Labour)
2017	Ross Vettraino (SNP)	Vikki Wilton (SNP)	Derek Noble (Labour)
2022	Ross Vettraino (SNP)	Daniel Wilson (SNP)	Derek Noble (Labour)
2025	Lynda Holton (SNP)	Daniel Wilson (SNP)	Derek Noble (Labour)

== Election results ==
=== 2025 by-election ===
Glenrothes Central and Thornton by-election (24 April 2025) - 1 seat
Party	Candidate	FPv%	Count			
Party	Candidate	FPv%	1	2	3	4
SNP	Lynda Holton		1,439	1,451	1,489	1,623
Labour	Maciej Dokurno		649	674	753	878
Reform UK	Ian Smith		541	591	652	
Liberal Democrats	Ed Scotcher		207	257		
Conservative	Fiona Leslie		185			
Electorate: 12,623 Valid: 3,021 Spoilt: 63 Quota: 1,511 Turnout: 24.2%

== Notes ==
Glenrothes Central and Thornton - 3 seats
Party	Candidate	FPv%	Count					
Party	Candidate	FPv%	1	2	3	4	5	6
SNP	Ross Vettraino (incumbent)	34.1%	1,588					
Labour	Derek Noble (incumbent)	27.9%	1,299					
SNP	Daniel Wilson	14.6%	679	1,046.1	1,063.3	1,067.9	1,114.1	1,220.7
Conservative	Heather Gulline	12.1%	561	566.3	585.9	607.8	620.3	631.8
Liberal Democrats	Jane Kerr	3.9%	183	188.9	223.2	231.9	246.5	297.2
Scottish Green	Morven Ovenstone-Jones	3.7%	170	180.1	191.5	207.8	221.9	
Alba	Jim Bryce	2.2%	101	105.8	109	116.4		
Scottish Family	Steve Saunders	1.5%	71	73.9	80.2			
Electorate: 12,021 Valid: 4,652 Spoilt: 90 Quota: 1,164 Turnout: 39.4%

Glenrothes Central and Thornton - 3 seats
Party	Candidate	FPv%	Count									
Party	Candidate	FPv%	1	2	3	4	5	6	7	8	9	10
SNP	Ross Vetraino (incumbent)	28.1	1,362									
SNP	Vikki Wilton	16.5	799	927.6	938.07	943.07	989.06	995.2	1,023.4	1,066.7	1,081.6	1,166.2
Labour	Derek Noble	15.5	750	752.3	754.3	761.5	774.8	796.9	836.9	1,370.6		
Conservative	Brian Mills	14.8	716	717.3	719.3	721.3	729.3	764.3	803.3	837.8	866.8	
Labour	Ian Sloan (incumbent)	13.7	663	668.4	674.7	686.7	694.8	713.8	740.3			
Independent	Ian Crichton (incumbent)	3.1	151	151.9	169.9	214.2	230.3	257.4				
Liberal Democrats	Jane Kerr	2.6	128	128.8	128.8	131.9	145.9					
Scottish Green	Glen McGill	2.4	117	118.7	125.7	129.7						
Independent	Ian Robertson	1.8	88	88.9	103.9							
Independent	Bert Thomson	1.5	71	72.1								
Electorate: 12,044 Valid: 4,845 Spoilt: 143 Quota: 1,212 Turnout: 4,988 (41.4%)

Glenrothes Central and Thornton - 3 seats
Party	Candidate	FPv%	Count						
Party	Candidate	FPv%	1	2	3	4	5	6	7
SNP	Ross Vettraino (incumbent)	29.66	1,197						
Labour	Ian Crichton (incumbent)	26.04	1,051						
Labour	Ian Sloane	20.64	833	847.5	881.7	897.1	928.1	1,008.7	1,203.6
SNP	Vikki Wilton	14.17	572	728.1	729.4	736.7	759.3	799.5	
Scottish Senior Citizens	Jim Benvie	4.22	172	177.5	179.1	192.5	245.7		
Conservative	Brian Mills	3.87	156	157.4	157.8	168.9			
Liberal Democrats	Jane Kerr	1.36	55	55.8	56.3				
Electorate: 10,797 Valid: 4,036 Spoilt: 76 Quota: 1,010 Turnout: 4,112 (37.38%)

Glenrothes Central and Thornton
Party	Candidate	FPv%	%	Seat	Count
SNP	Dave Cunningham	1,825	34.6	1	1
Labour	Ian Crichton	1,325	25.1	2	1
SNP	Ross Vettraino	707	13.4	3	6
Labour	John Mowbray	564	10.7		
Liberal Democrats	Jane Kerr	301	5.7		
Independent	Vina Bullimore	279	5.3		
Conservative	Jamie Drew	269	5.1		
