= Glenrothes North, Leslie and Markinch (ward) =

Electoral ward of Fife, Scotland

Location of the ward

Glenrothes North, Leslie and Markinch is one of the 22 wards used to elect members of the Fife council. It elects four Councillors.

== Councillors ==
Election	Councillors			
2007	Fiona Grant (SNP)	John Beare (SNP)	William Kay (Labour)	William Morrison (Labour)
2012	Fiona Grant (SNP)	John Beare (SNP)	William Kay (Labour)	William Morrison (Labour)
2013	Fiona Grant (SNP)	John Beare (SNP)	John Wincott (Labour)	William Morrison (Labour)
2017	Fiona Grant (SNP)	John Beare (SNP)	Jan Wincott (Labour)	Michael Green (Conservative)
2022	Lynn Mowatt (SNP)	John Beare (SNP)	Jan Wincott (Labour)	Peter Gulline (Conservative)

== Election results ==
=== 2022 Election ===
2022 Fife Council election

Glenrothes North, Leslie and Markinch - 4 seats
Party	Candidate	FPv%	Count							
Party	Candidate	FPv%	1	2	3	4	5	6	7	8
SNP	John Beare (incumbent)	27.7%	1,730							
Conservative	Peter Gulline	18.6%	1,161	1,166	1,168.4	1,198.3	1,203.9	1,296.8		
SNP	Lynn Mowatt	16.9%	1,059	1,433.4						
Labour	Jan Wincott (incumbent)	15%	940	951.9	973	984.4	1,026.1	1,106.3	1,118.3	1,853.3
Labour	Afifa Khanam	11.4%	714	727	737.1	747.5	806.1	906.9	917	
Liberal Democrats	Frances Bennie	5.1%	318	329.3	338.4	351.2	422			
Green	Bryce Goodall	3.6%	224	256.6	320.2	342.4				
Scottish Family	George Carratt	1.7%	109	112.6	117.8					
Electorate: 14,432 Valid: 6,255 Spoilt: 116 Quota: 1,252 Turnout: 44.1%

=== 2017 Election ===
2017 Fife Council election

Glenrothes North, Leslie and Markinch - 4 seats
Party	Candidate	FPv%	Count							
Party	Candidate	FPv%	1	2	3	4	5	6	7	8
SNP	Fiona Grant (incumbent)	25.95	1,704							
Conservative	Michael Green	22.97	1,508							
SNP	John Beare (incumbent)	17.1	1,123	1,435.9						
Labour	Jan Wincott	14.5	949	964.4	992.7	1,004.5	1,019.07	1,093.06	1,167.2	1,320.7
Labour	John Wincott (incumbent)	7.8	514	519.9	527.5	530.5	532.4	551.8	583.04	612.8
BUP	Jamie Donaldson	3.8	249	251.9	311.9	314.9	334.3	360.5		
Green	Lorna Ross	3.5	232	252.4	258.6	303.9	329.7	390.06	441.4	
Liberal Democrats	Kate Legg	3.1	204	210.4	241.7	247.7	265.2			
Independent	Kyle Mackie	1.2	81	86.3	95.07	101.7				
Electorate: 14,497 Valid: 6,564 Spoilt: 113 Quota: 1,313 Turnout: 6,677 (46.1%)

=== 2013 By-election ===
A by-election was called after William Kay died.

Glenrothes North, Leslie and Markinch by-election (20 June 2013) - 1 seat
Party	Candidate	FPv%	Count			
Party	Candidate	FPv%	1	2	3	4
Labour	John Wincott	45.8	1,896	1,927	1,966	2,095
SNP	Keith Grieve	41.3	1,711	1,724	1,761	1,814
Conservative	Allan David Stewart Smith	6.6	272	287	335	
UKIP	Peter Taggerty	4.3	176	184		
Liberal Democrats	Harry Wills	2.0	83			
Electorate: 14,252 Valid: 4,138 Spoilt: 25 Quota: 2,070 Turnout: 4,163 (29.21%)

=== 2012 Election ===
2012 Fife Council election

Glenrothes North, Leslie and Markinch - 4 seats
Party	Candidate	FPv%	Count						
Party	Candidate	FPv%	1	2	3	4	5	6	7
Labour	William Kay (incumbent) †^{01}	23.48	1,253						
SNP	Fiona Grant (incumbent)	22.35	1,193						
SNP	John Beare (incumbent)	17.73	946	949.8	1,021.6	1,024	1,031.2	1,060.5	1,106.7
Labour	Kay Morrison (incumbent)	17.43	930	1,090.8					
SNP	Steven Marwick	7.44	397	399.1	430.9	432.1	437.5	465.3	496.2
Conservative	Allan David Stewart Smith	5.81	310	312.8	315.5	316.8	344.8	411.8	
Scottish Senior Citizens	Jim Parker	4.23	226	231.6	238	243	265.8		
Liberal Democrats	Michael Steel	1.54	82	83.9	84.9	86.5			
Electorate: 14,278 Valid: 5,337 Spoilt: 57 Quota: 1,068 Turnout: 5,394 (37.38%)

=== 2007 Election ===
2007 Fife Council election

Glenrothes North, Leslie and Markinch
Party	Candidate	FPv%	%	Seat	Count
SNP	Fiona Grant	1,807	26.8	1	1
SNP	John Beare	1,613	23.9	2	1
Labour	William Kay	1,354	20.0	3	2
Labour	Kay Morrison	787	11.7	4	8
Conservative	David Mole	504	7.5		
Liberal Democrats	Harry Wills	411	6.1		
Independent	Alex Lawson	164	2.4		
Scottish Socialist	Morag Balfour	114	1.7		
UKIP	Paul Smith	90	1.3		
