= East Neuk and Landward (ward) =

Location of the ward

East Neuk and Landward is one of the 22 wards used to elect members of the Fife council. It elects three Councillors.

== Councillors ==
Election	Councillors		
2007	Elizabeth Riches (Liberal Democrats)	Donald MacGregor (Liberal Democrats)	Mike Scott-Hayward (Conservative /UKIP)
2010	Elizabeth Riches (Liberal Democrats)	Donald MacGregor (Liberal Democrats)	Mike Scott-Hayward (Conservative /UKIP)
2012	Elizabeth Riches (Liberal Democrats)	Donald MacGregor (Liberal Democrats)	John Docherty (SNP/ Ind.)
2017	Bill Porteous (Liberal Democrats)	Linda Holt (Conservative /Ind.)	John Docherty (SNP/ Ind.)
2019	Bill Porteous (Liberal Democrats)	Linda Holt (Conservative /Ind.)	John Docherty (SNP/ Ind.)
2022	Fiona Corps (Liberal Democrats)	Sean Dillon (Liberal Democrats)	Alycia Hayes (SNP)

== Election results ==
=== 2022 Election ===
2022 Fife Council election

East Neuk and Landward - 3 seats
Party	Candidate	FPv%	Count						
Party	Candidate	FPv%	1	2	3	4	5	6	7
Liberal Democrats	Fiona Corps	32.1%	1,721						
SNP	Alycia Hayes	25.1%	1,345						
Liberal Democrats	Sean Dillon	13.7%	679	998.7	999.2	1,015.2	1,063	1,203.8	1,425
Conservative	Debbie MacCallum	13.2%	707	724.7	724.8	731	744.2	748.5	848
Independent	Linda Holt (incumbent)	7.5%	404	417.3	417.6	455.6	469.8	516.7	
Green	David Stutchfield	5.2%	281	291	293.5	303.8	339.6		
Labour	Stuart Irwin	2.6%	139	143.4	143.8	146			
Independent	John Docherty (incumbent)	1.5%	80	84.6	84.9				
Electorate: 10,467 Valid: 5,356 Spoilt: 58 Quota: 1,340 Turnout: 51.7%

=== 2017 Election ===
2017 Fife Council election

East Neuk and Landward - 3 seats
Party	Candidate	FPv%	Count						
Party	Candidate	FPv%	1	2	3	4	5	6	7
Conservative	Linda Holt††††	28.9	1,508						
Liberal Democrats	Bill Porteous	19.4	1,014	1,095.3	1,138.2	1,216.08	1,268.6	1,281.5	2,249.3
Liberal Democrats	Alisdair Gilbert	17.09	891	930.2	974.3	1,050.7	1,059.9	1,073.4	
SNP	John Docherty (incumbent)††††††	13.5	703	704.8	744.9	766.3	1,368.4		
SNP	Margaret Harper	12.2	634	635.8	680.03	715.3			
Labour	Rosalind Garton	4.6	242	252.6	291.4				
Green	Benjamin Bridgman	4.3	222	227.4					
Electorate: 10,149 Valid: 5,214 Spoilt: 63 Quota: 1,304 Turnout: 5,277 (52%)

=== 2012 Election ===
2012 Fife Council election

East Neuk and Landward - 3 seats
Party	Candidate	FPv%	Count					
Party	Candidate	FPv%	1	2	3	4	5	6
Liberal Democrats	Elizabeth Riches (incumbent)	26.94	1,066					
SNP	John Docherty	24.36	964	970.5	1,068.3			
Liberal Democrats	Donald MacGregor (incumbent)	13.29	526	576.8	678.2	699.4	825.2	1,098.1
Conservative	Tom Waterton-Smith	13.70	542	545.3	561.4	566.4	735.8	
UKIP	Mike Scott-Hayward (incumbent)	11.27	446	452.4	504.6	518.5		
Labour	Mary Cairns	10.44	413	416.4				
Electorate: 10,249 Valid: 3,957 Spoilt: 22 Quota: 990 Turnout: 3,979 (38.61%)

=== 2007 Election ===
2007 Fife Council election

East Neuk and Landward
Party	Candidate	FPv%	%	Seat	Count
Liberal Democrats	Elizabeth Riches	1,696	31.1	1	1
Conservative	Mike Scott-Hayward†	1,515	27.8	2	1
SNP	Margaret Wight	1,041	19.1		
Liberal Democrats	Donald MacGregor	816	15.0	3	4
Labour	Reta Russell	387	7.1		
