= Kirkcaldy East (ward) =

Electoral ward of Fife, Scotland

Location of the ward

Kirkcaldy East is one of the 22 wards used to elect members of the Fife council. It elects three Councillors.

== Councillors ==
| Election | Councillors | | |
|---|---|---|---|
| 2007 | George Leslie (SNP/ Ind.) | Lawrence Brown (Labour) | Kay Carrington (Labour) |
| 2010 | George Leslie (SNP/ Ind.) | Lawrence Brown (Labour) | Kay Carrington (Labour) |
| 2012 | Arthur Morrison (SNP) | Lawrence Brown (Labour) | Kay Carrington (Labour) |
| 2015 | Marie Penman (SNP/ Ind.) | Lawrence Brown (Labour) | Kay Carrington (Labour) |
| 2016 | Marie Penman (SNP/ Ind.) | Lawrence Brown (Labour) | Kay Carrington (Labour) |
| 2017 | Rod Cavanagh (SNP) | Ian Cameron (Labour) | Richard Watt (Conservative) |
| 2022 | Rod Cavanagh (SNP) | Ian Cameron (Labour) | Nicola Patrick (SNP) |

== Election results ==
=== 2022 Election ===
2022 Fife Council election

Kirkcaldy East - 3 seats
| Party | Candidate | FPv% | Count | | | | | | | |
| Party | Candidate | FPv% | 1 | 2 | 3 | 4 | 5 | 6 | 7 | 8 |
|---|---|---|---|---|---|---|---|---|---|---|
| Labour | Ian Cameron (incumbent) | 32.9% | 1,313 | | | | | | | |
| SNP | Rod Cavanagh (incumbent) | 23.1% | 924 | 944.1 | 950.1 | 955.1 | 1,011.3 | | | |
| SNP | Nicola Patrick | 17.2% | 687 | 693.7 | 696.7 | 702.2 | 772.1 | 782.6 | 793.6 | 931.9 |
| Conservative | Richard Watt (incumbent) | 11.7% | 469 | 475.9 | 480.2 | 516.8 | 524.6 | 524.6 | | |
| Labour | George Macdonald | 6.8% | 273 | 510.2 | 512.7 | 539.3 | 578.4 | 579.1 | 774.9 | |
| Green | David Hansen | 4.3% | 172 | 180.4 | 186.4 | 211.3 | | | | |
| Liberal Democrats | Wink Thompson | 2.9% | 116 | 123.2 | 133.9 | | | | | |
| Sovereignty | Walter Neilson | 1% | 41 | 43.4 | | | | | | |
Electorate: 11,052 Valid: 3,995 Spoilt: 130 Quota: 999 Turnout: 37.3%

=== 2017 Election ===
2017 Fife Council election

Kirkcaldy East - 3 seats
| Party | Candidate | FPv% | Count | | | | | | | | |
| Party | Candidate | FPv% | 1 | 2 | 3 | 4 | 5 | 6 | 7 | 8 | 9 |
|---|---|---|---|---|---|---|---|---|---|---|---|
| Labour | Ian Cameron | 24.7 | 985 | 993 | 1,002 | | | | | | |
| SNP | Rod Cavanagh | 22.5 | 897 | 898 | 903 | 903.08 | 946.08 | 968.3 | 1,035.3 | | |
| Conservative | Richard Watt | 15.3 | 611 | 625 | 630 | 630.09 | 642.09 | 671.4 | 791.5 | 791.7 | 924.8 |
| SNP | Steve McMahon | 13.3 | 533 | 537 | 551 | 551.03 | 584.03 | 596.1 | 682.1 | 714.9 | |
| Independent | Marie Penman (incumbent) | 10.5 | 421 | 438 | 483 | 483.2 | 532.2 | 591.6 | | | |
| Labour | Mhairi Cameron | 5 | 199 | 203 | 209 | 211.4 | 237.4 | | | | |
| Green | Sandy Forbes | 4.1 | 164 | 176 | 189 | 189.04 | | | | | |
| Independent | Matthew Ritchie | 2.7 | 108 | 111 | | | | | | | |
| Liberal Democrats | Stephen Rottger | 1.9 | 75 | | | | | | | | |
Electorate: 10,747 Valid: 3,993 Spoilt: 119 Quota: 999 Turnout: 4,112 (38.3%)

=== 2015 By-election ===
A by-election was called after Arthur Morrison resigned due to poor attendance.

Kirkcaldy East by-election (22 January 2015) - 1 seat
| Party | Candidate | FPv% | Count | | | | | |
| Party | Candidate | FPv% | 1 | 2 | 3 | 4 | 5 | 6 |
|---|---|---|---|---|---|---|---|---|
| SNP | Marie Penman | 47.33 | 1,460 | 1,464 | 1,466 | 1,472 | 1,484 | 1,553 |
| Labour | Liz Easton | 35.27 | 1,088 | 1,088 | 1,091 | 1,097 | 1,120 | 1,148 |
| Conservative | Edgar Cook | 7.23 | 223 | 224 | 225 | 231 | 266 | 274 |
| Green | Claire Reid | 4.08 | 126 | 129 | 132 | 138 | 150 | |
| UKIP | Peter Adams | 3.79 | 117 | 117 | 120 | 123 | | |
| Liberal Democrats | Callum Leslie | 1.30 | 40 | 40 | 41 | | | |
| Independent | Ronald Hunter | 0.62 | 19 | 21 | | | | |
| Independent | Alastair MacIntyre | 0.39 | 12 | | | | | |
Electorate: 10,924 Valid: 3,085 Spoilt: 41 Quota: 1,543 Turnout: 3,126 (27.27%)

=== 2012 Election ===
2012 Fife Council election

Kirkcaldy East
| Party | Candidate | FPv% | Count | | | | | | |
| Party | Candidate | FPv% | 1 | 2 | 3 | 4 | 5 | 6 | 7 |
|---|---|---|---|---|---|---|---|---|---|
| Labour | Lawrence Brown (incumbent) | 29.90 | 1,111 | | | | | | |
| Labour | Kay Carrington (incumbent) †^{14} | 20.05 | 745 | 900.9 | 926.1 | 963.3 | | | |
| SNP | Arthur Morrison †^{05} | 19.97 | 742 | 746.7 | 763.1 | 790.2 | 795.2 | 838.6 | 1,409.6 |
| SNP | Frank Wallace | 16.42 | 610 | 613.1 | 620.3 | 651.4 | 654.3 | 675.5 | |
| Conservative | Edgar Cook | 6.03 | 224 | 226.4 | 251.8 | 295.9 | 299.1 | | |
| Scottish Senior Citizens | Mike Parker | 4.84 | 180 | 182.1 | 195.3 | | | | |
| Liberal Democrats | Callum Leslie | 2.80 | 104 | 106.1 | | | | | |
Electorate: 10,749 Valid: 3,716 Spoilt: 60 Quota: 930 Turnout: 3,776 (34.57%)

=== 2007 Election ===
2007 Fife Council election

Kirkcaldy East
| Party | Candidate | FPv% | % | Seat | Count |
|---|---|---|---|---|---|
| SNP | George Leslie†† | 1,680 | 35.4 | 1 | 1 |
| Labour | Lawrence Brown | 1,221 | 25.7 | 2 | 1 |
| Labour | Kay Carrington | 773 | 16.3 | 3 | 5 |
| Liberal Democrats | Bob Forrester | 572 | 12.1 | | |
| Conservative | Brian Mills | 361 | 7.6 | | |
| Scottish Socialist | Karen McGregor | 138 | 2.9 | | |
