= St Andrews (Fife ward) =

Electoral ward of Fife, Scotland

Location of the ward

St Andrews is one of the 22 wards used to elect members of the Fife council. It elects four Councillors.

== Councillors ==
Election	Councillors			
2007	Robin Waterson (Liberal Democrats)	Bill Sangster (Liberal Democrats)	Frances Melville (Liberal Democrats)	Dorothea Morrison (Conservative)
2012	Keith McCartney (SNP)	Brian Thompson (Labour)	Frances Melville (Liberal Democrats)	Dorothea Morrison (Conservative)
2017	Ann Verner (SNP)	Brian Thompson (Labour)	Jane Ann Liston (Liberal Democrats)	Dominic Nolan (Conservative)
2022	Ann Verner (SNP)	Al Clark (Liberal Democrats)	Jane Ann Liston (Liberal Democrats)	Robin Lawson (Conservative)

== Election results ==
=== 2022 Election ===
2022 Fife Council election

St Andrews - 4 Seats
Party	Candidate	FPv%	Count					
Party	Candidate	FPv%	1	2	3	4	5	6
Liberal Democrats	Jane Liston (incumbent)	25.1%	1,265					
Liberal Democrats	Al Clark	23%	1,161					
SNP	Ann Verner (incumbent)	22.2%	1,123					
Conservative	Robin Lawson	14.7%	742	800.9	841.6	844.4	860.9	1,120
Labour	Rosalind Garton	8.4%	422	493.4	535.8	554.3	842.2	
Green	Fergus Cook	6.6%	335	385.8	408	468.4		
Electorate: 12,106 Valid: 5,048 Spoilt: 37 Quota: 1,010 Turnout: 42%

=== 2017 Election ===
2017 Fife Council election

St. Andrews - 4 Seats
Party	Candidate	FPv%	Count								
Party	Candidate	FPv%	1	2	3	4	5	6	7	8	9
Liberal Democrats	Jane Ann Liston	21.54%	1,083								
Conservative	Dominic Nolan	20.03%	1,007								
Labour	Brian Thomson (incumbent)	12.73%	640	644.6	647.8	657.9	742.2	753.3	856.1	863.7	1156.4
SNP	Ann Verner	10.5%	528	529.1	532.2	536.2	582.2	990.5	1037.6		
Independent	Dorothea Morrison (incumbent)	9.87%	496	501	513	555.5	583.6	586.8			
Liberal Democrats	Mariam Mahmood	8.97%	451	509.1	519.3	529.9	597	607.1	763.5	769.6	
SNP	Colin Veitch	8.04%	404	404.8	405.6	407.8	450.9				
Green	Andy Collins	5.63%	283	284.9	293.1	298.2					
Independent	Christopher McKinlay	1.45%	73	74.5	91.5						
Independent	Clare Fisher	1.23%	62	62.7							
Electorate: 10209 Valid: 5027 Spoilt: 53 Quota: 1006 Turnout: 5080 49.8%

=== 2012 Election ===
2012 Fife Council election

St. Andrews
Party	Candidate	FPv%	Count							
Party	Candidate	FPv%	1	2	3	4	5	6	7	8
Conservative	Dorothea Morrison (incumbent)	17.43	769	796	820	843	889			
SNP	Keith McCartney	15.64	690	706	725	806	838	867.1	867.4	979.3
Liberal Democrats	Frances Melville (incumbent)	14.53	641	665	772	858	1,189			
Labour	Brian Thomson	13.60	600	629	647	742	776	828.8	829.2	951.2
Green	Benjamin Bridgman	9.91	437	453	464					
Independent	Murdo MacDonald	8.37	369	453	475	534	569	624.3	626.1	
Liberal Democrats	Robin Waterston (incumbent)	7.96	351	381	466	518				
Liberal Democrats	Bill Sangster (incumbent)	6.76	298	311						
Independent	Henry Paul	5.80	256							
Electorate: 14,331 Valid: 4,411 Spoilt: 32 Quota: 883 Turnout: 4,443 (30.78%)

=== 2007 Election ===
2007 Fife Council election

St Andrews
Party	Candidate	FPv%	%	Seat	Count
Conservative	Dorothea Morrison	1,478	22.1	1	1
Liberal Democrats	Frances Melville	1,454	21.8	2	1
Liberal Democrats	Bill Sangster	809	12.1	3	9
Liberal Democrats	Robin Waterston	788	11.8	4	9
SNP	John Docherty	775	11.6		
Green	Tess Darwin	525	7.9		
Labour	Zoe Smith	411	6.2		
Independent	Joe Peterson	153	2.3		
Independent	Maries Cassells	131	2.0		
Independent	Karen Hutchence	81	1.2		
Independent	Keith Griffiths	77	1.2		
