= Cowdenbeath (ward) =

Electoral ward of Fife, Scotland

Location of the ward

Cowdenbeath is one of the 22 wards used to elect members of Fife Council. The ward elects four Councillors, covering the town of Cowdenbeath as well as the nearby villages of Crossgates, Hill of Beath, Kelty, and Lumphinnans.

== Councillors ==
| Election | Councillors | | | |
|---|---|---|---|---|
| 2007 | Alistair John Bain (SNP) | John Simpson (Labour) | Alex Maxwell (Ind.) | 3 seats |
| 2012 | Alistair John Bain (SNP) | Jayne Baxter (Labour) | Peter Lockhart (Labour) | 3 seats |
| 2014 | Alistair John Bain (SNP) | Gary Guichan (Labour) | Peter Lockhart (Labour) | 3 seats |
| 2017 | Alistair John Bain (SNP) | Gary Guichan (Labour) | Alex Campbell (Labour) | Darren Watt (Conservative) |
| 2022 | Alistair John Bain (SNP) | Bailey-Lee Robb (SNP) | Alex Campbell (Labour) | Darren Watt (Conservative) |

== Election results ==
=== 2022 Election ===
2022 Fife Council election

Cowdenbeath - 4 seats
| Party | Candidate | FPv% | Count | | | | | | | | |
| Party | Candidate | FPv% | 1 | 2 | 3 | 4 | 5 | 6 | 7 | 8 | 9 |
|---|---|---|---|---|---|---|---|---|---|---|---|
| Labour | Alex Campbell (incumbent) | 30.6% | 2,028 | | | | | | | | |
| SNP | Alie Bain (incumbent) | 28.9% | 1,916 | | | | | | | | |
| Conservative | Darren Watt (incumbent) | 18.9% | 1,256 | 1,309.9 | 1,320.1 | 1,346.1 | | | | | |
| SNP | Bailey-Lee Robb | 7.7% | 513 | 543.8 | 1,001.8 | 1,009.6 | 1,010.8 | 1,047.5 | 1,054.9 | 1,162.6 | 1,381.2 |
| Labour | Gary Guichan (incumbent) | 7.4% | 489 | 992.3 | 1,020.6 | 1,034.3 | 1,040.6 | 1,055.6 | 1,094.5 | 1,158.4 | |
| Green | Alyssa Lee | 2.5% | 169 | 179.7 | 207.4 | 217.7 | 218.4 | 237.3 | 260.3 | | |
| Liberal Democrats | Peter Venturi | 1.4% | 96 | 106.7 | 108.6 | 113.2 | 116.6 | 120.3 | | | |
| Alba | Jacqueline Bijster | 1.3% | 85 | 92.3 | 110.1 | 115.7 | 116 | | | | |
| Scottish Family | Helen Grieg | 1.2% | 80 | 90 | 96.8 | | | | | | |
Electorate: 17,132 Valid: 6,632 Spoilt: 182 Quota: 1,327 Turnout: 39.8%

=== 2017 Election ===
Cowdenbeath - 4 seats
| Party | Candidate | FPv% | Count | | | | | | |
| Party | Candidate | FPv% | 1 | 2 | 3 | 4 | 5 | 6 | 7 |
|---|---|---|---|---|---|---|---|---|---|
| Labour | Alex Campbell (incumbent) | 31.4 | 2,065 | | | | | | |
| SNP | Alistair Bain (incumbent) | 21.5 | 1,415 | | | | | | |
| Labour | Gary Guichan (incumbent) | 15.7 | 1,030 | 1,563.2 | | | | | |
| Conservative | Darren Watt | 15.4 | 1,013 | 1,054.4 | 1,091.9 | 1,092.8 | 1,145.6 | 1,180.6 | 1,492.2 |
| SNP | Ann Bain (incumbent) | 12.2 | 799 | 851.7 | 878.2 | 969.06 | 975.9 | 1,058.5 | |
| Green | Angela Dixon | 2.3 | 150 | 164.2 | 182.3 | 184.9 | 215.5 | | |
| Liberal Democrats | Elizabeth Riches * | 1.5 | 101 | 113.7 | 144.02 | 144.7 | | | |
Electorate: 16,440 Valid: 6,573 Spoilt: 134 Quota: 1,315 Turnout: 6,707 (40.8%)

=== 2014 By-election ===
A by-election was held after Jane Baxter became an MSP.

Cowdenbeath by-election (22 May 2014) - 1 seat
| Party | Candidate | FPv% | Count |
| Party | Candidate | FPv% | 1 |
|---|---|---|---|
| Labour | Gary Guichan | 61.5 | 2,039 |
| SNP | Connor Watt | 25.2 | 834 |
| UKIP | Judith Rideout | 8.4 | 277 |
| Conservative | John Wheatley | 4.9 | 164 |
Valid: 3,314 Turnout: 29.67%

=== 2012 Election ===
Cowdenbeath - 3 seats
| Party | Candidate | FPv% | Count | |
| Party | Candidate | FPv% | 1 | 2 |
|---|---|---|---|---|
| Labour | Peter Lockhart | 35.32 | 1,309 | |
| Labour | Jayne Baxter †^{04} | 30.14 | 1,117 | |
| SNP | Alistair Bain (incumbent) | 24.15 | 895 | 959.2 |
| SNP | Darren Tod | 4.86 | 180 | 197.5 |
| Conservative | Alistair Harvey | 3.40 | 126 | 142.9 |
| Liberal Democrats | Elaine Walker | 2.13 | 79 | 114 |
Electorate: 10,742 Valid: 3,706 Spoilt: 61 Quota: 927 Turnout: 3,767 (34.50%)

=== 2007 Election ===
Cowdenbeath
| Party | Candidate | FPv% | % | Seat | Count |
|---|---|---|---|---|---|
| Labour | John Simpson | 1,414 | 27.5 | 1 | 1 |
| Independent | Alex Maxwell | 1,350 | 26.3 | 2 | 1 |
| SNP | Alistair John Bain | 968 | 18.9 | 3 | 6 |
| Labour | Lesley McEwan | 624 | 12.1 | | |
| Independent | Robert Arnott | 384 | 7.5 | | |
| Liberal Democrats | Mary Hipwell | 246 | 4.8 | | |
| Conservative | Keith Smith | 148 | 2.9 | | |
