= Dunfermline North (ward) =

Electoral ward of Fife, Scotland

Location of the ward

Dunfermline North is one of the 22 wards used to elect members of the Fife council. It elects three Councillors.

== Councillors ==
Election	Councillors		
2007	David Mogg (SNP)	Bill McCulloch (Labour)	Jim Burke (Liberal Democrats)
2012	David Mogg (SNP)	Helen Law (Labour)	William Campbell (Labour)
2015	Ian Ferguson (SNP)	Helen Law (Labour)	William Campbell (Labour)
2017	Ian Ferguson (SNP)	Helen Law (Labour)	Gavin Ellis (Conservative)
2022	Auxi Barrera (SNP)	Gordon Pryde (Labour)	Gavin Ellis (Conservative)

== Election results ==
=== 2022 election ===
Dunfermline North - 3 seats
Party	Candidate	FPv%	Count							
Party	Candidate	FPv%	1	2	3	4	5	6	7	8
Labour	Gordon Pryde	28.5	1,627							
SNP	Auxi Barrera	23.6	1,350	1,360	1,365	1,368	1,509			
Conservative	Gavin Ellis (incumbent)	17.8	1,017	1,049	1,059	1,084	1,107	1,108	1,365	1,474
SNP	Craig McIvor	15.4	882	896	897	903	973	1,042	1,120	
Liberal Democrats	Caroline McIlwraith	6.4	363	421	432	448	535	538		
Green	Mags Hall	5.9	338	354	372	387				
Scottish Family	Karen Smith	1.4	80	86	93					
TUSC	Dave Edler	0.9	53	66						
Electorate: 12,503 Valid: 5,710 Spoilt: 79 Quota: 1,428 Turnout: 46.3%

=== 2017 election ===
2017 Fife Council election

Dunfermline North - 3 seats
Party	Candidate	FPv%	Count						
Party	Candidate	FPv%	1	2	3	4	5	6	7
Conservative	Gavin Ellis	23.46%	1,264	1,274	1,432				
SNP	Ian Ferguson (incumbent)	22.01%	1,186	1,216	1,240	1,242.1	1909.5		
Labour	Helen Law (incumbent)	16.02%	863	880	1,016	1,032.8	1,053.8	1,169.5	1,971.5
Labour	Michael Boyd	13.96%	752	774	850	870.3	893.4	994.8	
SNP	Fiona Fisher	12.29%	662	714	746	746.9			
Liberal Democrats	Bryn Jones	8.5%	458	503					
Green	Mags Hall	3.77%	203						
Electorate: 11,908 Valid: 5,388 Spoilt: 87 Quota: 1,348 Turnout: 5,475 (46%)

=== 2015 by-election ===
A by-election was held after David Mogg resigned.

Dunfermline North by-election (26 November 2015) - 1 seat
Party	Candidate	FPv%	Count					
Party	Candidate	FPv%	1	2	3	4	5	6
SNP	Ian Ferguson	43.5%	1,056	1,062	1,083	1,122	1,144	1,337
Labour	Joe Long	29.6%	719	722	733	805	912	
Conservative	James Reekie	12.5%	304	319	321	389		
Liberal Democrats	James Calder	9.5%	230	235	253			
Green	Lewis Campbell	2.6%	63	72				
UKIP	Chloanne Dodds	2.4%	58					
Electorate: 10,166 Valid: 2,430 Spoilt: 20 Quota: 1,216 Turnout: 2,450 (24.06%)

=== 2012 election ===
2012 Fife Council election

Dunfermline North - 3 seats
Party	Candidate	FPv%	Count			
Party	Candidate	FPv%	1	2	3	4
SNP	David Mogg (incumbent) †^{11}	31.55	1,204			
Labour	Helen Law	26.13	997			
Labour	William Campbell	23.17	884	913.3	949.4	988.2
Liberal Democrats	James Calder	13.57	518	570.9	572.8	722.3
Conservative	Graeme Whyte	6.63	253	269.9	270.7	
Electorate: 10,162 Valid: 3,816 Spoilt: 54 Quota: 955 Turnout: 3,862 (37.55%)

=== 2007 election ===
2007 Fife Council election

Dunfermline North
Party	Candidate	FPv%	%	Seat	Count
Liberal Democrats	Jim Burke	1,451	27.5	1	1
Labour	Bill McCulloch	1,254	23.8	2	4
SNP	David Mogg	1,236	23.4	3	6
Health Concern	Gill Cunningham	690	13.0		
Conservative	Paul Callaghan	313	5.9		
Labour	Robert McGregor	272	5.2		
Independent	Jason McGilvray	59	11.2		
