= Tay Bridgehead (ward) =

Electoral ward of Fife, Scotland

Location of the ward

Tay Bridgehead is one of the 22 wards used to elect members of the Fife council. It elects three Councillors.

== Councillors ==
Election	Councillors		
2007	Tim Brett (Liberal Democrats)	Maggie Taylor (Liberal Democrats)	Ron Caird (Conservative)
2012	Tim Brett (Liberal Democrats)	Maggie Taylor (Liberal Democrats)	Bill Connor (SNP)
2017	Tim Brett (Liberal Democrats)	Jonny Tepp (Liberal Democrats)	Bill Connor (SNP)
2022	Allan Knox (Liberal Democrats)	Jonny Tepp (Liberal Democrats)	Louise Kennedy-Dalby (SNP)

== Election results ==
=== 2022 Election ===
2022 Fife Council election

Tay Bridgehead - 3 seats
Party	Candidate	FPv%	Count					
Party	Candidate	FPv%	1	2	3	4	5	6
SNP	Louise Kennedy-Dalby	28.4%	1,783					
Liberal Democrats	Jonny Tepp (incumbent)	26.9%	1,692					
Liberal Democrats	Allan Knox	21.2%	1,333	1,362	1,461.3	1,470.7	1,531.8	1,654.4
Conservative	Keith Barton	8.4%	527	528.8	534	535	559.1	582.7
Green	Colin Palmer	6.3%	397	500.6	506.8	553.1	588.3	676.1
Labour	Philip Thompson	4.3%	271	287.8	292.7	305.4	341.6	
Independent	Sean Elder	2.8%	177	184.1	186	214.3		
Alba	Steven Simpson	1.6%	100	120	120.3			
Electorate: 11,925 Valid: 6,280 Spoilt: 56 Quota: 1,571 Turnout: 53.1%

=== 2017 Election ===
2017 Fife Council election

Tay Bridgehead - 3 seats
Party	Candidate	FPv%	Count						
Party	Candidate	FPv%	1	2	3	4	5	6	7
Liberal Democrats	Tim Brett (incumbent)	35.3	2,270						
SNP	Bill Connor (incumbent)	18.6	1,197	1,233.9	1,314.1	1,357.2	2,041.6		
Conservative	Robert Drysdale	16.8	1,079	1,145.09	1,148.7	1,184	1,186.3	1,205.9	
Liberal Democrats	Jonny Tepp	10.2	657	1,134.2	1,191.9	1,346.2	1,375.7	1,514.09	2,186.6
SNP	Derek Gray	9.98	642	652.8	710.5	749.8			
Labour	Jane O' Neill	5.3	340	362.1	401.5				
Green	Fergus Cook	3.8	247	267.4					
Electorate: 11,525 Valid: 6,432 Spoilt: 111 Quota: 1,609 Turnout: 6,543 (56.8%)

=== 2012 Election ===
2012 Fife Council election

Tay Bridgehead - 3 seats
Party	Candidate	FPv%	Count			
Party	Candidate	FPv%	1	2	3	4
SNP	Bill Connor	25.41	1,214			
Liberal Democrats	Tim Brett (incumbent)	24.74	1,182	1,185.3	1,369.4	
Liberal Democrats	Margaret Taylor (incumbent)	20.80	994	997.1	1,146.3	1,287.3
Labour	Jane O'Neill	16.70	798	802.8	870.2	886.9
Conservative	Andrew MacQueen	12.35	590	591.1		
Electorate: 10,959 Valid: 4,778 Spoilt: 17 Quota: 1,195 Turnout: 4,795 (43.60%)

=== 2007 Election ===
2007 Fife Council election

Tay Bridgehead
Party	Candidate	FPv%	%	Seat	Count
Liberal Democrats	Tim Brett	1,489	25.8	1	1
Liberal Democrats	Maggie Taylor	1,243	21.5	2	4
Conservative	Ron Caird	1,191	20.6	3	5
SNP	Alastair Cruickshank	1,173	20.3		
Labour	Nikolai Zhelev	494	8.5		
UKIP	Duncan Pickard	190	3.3		
