= Dunfermline Central (ward) =

Ward located in Fife, Scotland

Location of the ward

Dunfermline Central is one of the 22 wards used to elect members of the Fife council. It elects four Councillors.

== Councillors ==
| Election | Councillors | | | |
|---|---|---|---|---|
| 2007 | Lizz Mogg (SNP) | Willie Sullivan (Labour) | Jackie McKenna (Liberal Democrats) | Joe Rosiejak (Liberal Democrats) |
| 2012 | Neale Hanvey (SNP) | Jim Leishman (Labour) | Bob Young (Labour) | Joe Rosiejak (Liberal Democrats) |
| 2017 | Jean Hall Muir (SNP) | Jim Leishman (Labour) | Gary Haldane (Labour) | Alan Craig (Conservative) |
| 2019 | Jean Hall Muir (SNP) | Jim Leishman (Labour) | Gary Haldane (Labour) | Derek Glen (SNP) |
| 2022 | Jean Hall Muir (SNP) | Jim Leishman (Labour) | Aude Boubaker-Calder (Liberal Democrats) | Derek Glen (SNP) |

== Election results ==
=== 2022 election ===
Dunfermline Central - 4 seats
| Party | Candidate | FPv% | Count | | | | | | | |
| Party | Candidate | FPv% | 1 | 2 | 3 | 4 | 5 | 6 | 7 | 8 |
|---|---|---|---|---|---|---|---|---|---|---|
| Liberal Democrats | Aude Boubaker-Calder | 24.7 | 1,970 | | | | | | | |
| SNP | Derek Glen (incumbent) | 20.1 | 1,603 | | | | | | | |
| SNP | Jean Hall Muir (incumbent) | 13.3 | 1,057 | 1,075 | 1,081 | 1,081 | 1,119 | 1,388 | 1,405 | 1,486 |
| Labour | Jim Leishman (incumbent) | 13.2 | 1,055 | 1,139 | 1,139 | 1,155 | 1,171 | 1,243 | 1,473 | 2,367 |
| Labour | Garry Haldane (incumbent) | 11.4 | 909 | 977 | 978 | 983 | 992 | 1,056 | 1,216 | |
| Conservative | Malcolm Macaulay | 9.4 | 752 | 841 | 841 | 856 | 861 | 878 | | |
| Scottish Green | Lewis Campbell | 6.0 | 478 | 519 | 520 | 526 | 538 | | | |
| Alba | Leanne Tervit | 1.2 | 94 | 95 | 95 | 101 | | | | |
| Scottish Family | Gary Pratt | 0.7 | 53 | 56 | 56 | | | | | |
Electorate: 16,854 Valid: 7,971 Spoilt: 100 Quota: 1,595 Turnout: 47.9%

=== 2019 by-election ===
In September 2019 Dunfermline Central Conservative Cllr Alan Craig resigned his seat. A by-election was held on 14 November 2019 and Derek Glen gained the seat for the SNP.

Dunfermline Central By-election (14 November 2019)
| Party | Candidate | FPv% | Count | | | | | |
| Party | Candidate | FPv% | 1 | 2 | 3 | 4 | 5 | 6 |
|---|---|---|---|---|---|---|---|---|
| SNP | Derek Glen | 33.16 | 1,526 | 1,528 | 1,628 | 1,761 | 1,798 | 2,297 |
| Conservative | Chloe Dodds | 24.82 | 1,142 | 1,150 | 1,150 | 1,202 | | |
| Liberal Democrats | Aude Boubaker-Calder | 22.82 | 1,050 | 1,053 | 1,117 | 1,343 | 1,796 | |
| Labour | Michael Boyd | 13.49 | 621 | 624 | 656 | | | |
| Scottish Green | Fiona McOwan | 5.11 | 235 | 237 | | | | |
| Scottish Libertarian | Keith Chamberlain | 0.61 | 28 | | | | | |
Electorate: 15,698 Quota: 2,302 Turnout: 4,602 (29.5%)

=== 2017 election ===
2017 Fife Council election

Dunfermline Central - 4 seats
| Party | Candidate | FPv% | Count | | | | | | | | |
| Party | Candidate | FPv% | 1 | 2 | 3 | 4 | 5 | 6 | 7 | 8 | 9 |
|---|---|---|---|---|---|---|---|---|---|---|---|
| Conservative | Alan Craig††† | 24.1 | 1,768 | | | | | | | | |
| SNP | Jean Hall Muir | 18.5 | 1,359 | 1,363.3 | 1,364.3 | 1,411.3 | 1,457.1 | 1,516.1 | | | |
| Labour | Jim Leishman (incumbent) | 15.1 | 1,115 | 1,154.6 | 1,157.6 | 1,195.6 | 1,370.7 | 1,645.2 | | | |
| Labour | Garry Haldane | 11.4 | 832 | 871.9 | 872.9 | 890.1 | 977.3 | 1,067.04 | 1,181.7 | 1,182.7 | 1,498.4 |
| SNP | Neale Hanvey (incumbent) | 11.2 | 821 | 822.4 | 823.4 | 867.7 | 890.6 | 960.9 | 972.8 | 1,020.4 | |
| Independent | Doug Hay | 8.9 | 655 | 716.7 | 730.4 | 756.6 | 888.6 | | | | |
| Liberal Democrats | Lauren Jones | 6.9 | 509 | 583.04 | 586.9 | 633.6 | | | | | |
| Scottish Green | Kerstin Romano | 3.2 | 238 | 245.4 | 249.7 | | | | | | |
| Independent | Deek Jackson | 0.37 | 27 | 31.5 | | | | | | | |
Electorate: 15,564 Valid: 7,324 Spoilt: 87 Quota: 1,465 Turnout: 7,417 (47.7%)

=== 2012 election ===
2012 Fife Council election

Dunfermline Central - 4 seats
| Party | Candidate | FPv% | Count | | | | | | |
| Party | Candidate | FPv% | 1 | 2 | 3 | 4 | 5 | 6 | 7 |
|---|---|---|---|---|---|---|---|---|---|
| Labour | Jim Leishman | 27.96 | 1,608 | | | | | | |
| Liberal Democrats | Joe Rosiejak (incumbent) | 17.88 | 1,028 | 1,072.3 | 1,243.2 | | | | |
| SNP | Neale Hanvey | 17.32 | 996 | 1,019.9 | 1,032.2 | 1,037.9 | 1,110.2 | 1,117.5 | 1,626.1 |
| Labour | Bob Young | 12.99 | 747 | 1,038.3 | 1,070.9 | 1,087.9 | 1,216.8 | | |
| SNP | Lizz Mogg(incumbent) | 9.2 | 529 | 557.4 | 570.9 | 582.2 | 641.2 | 648.2 | |
| Independent | Jim Gallagher | 7.34 | 422 | 445.3 | 541.3 | 564.8 | | | |
| Conservative | David Ross | 7.32 | 421 | 431.2 | | | | | |
Electorate: 14,864 Valid: 5,751 Spoilt: 64 Quota: 1,151 Turnout: 5,815 (38.69%)

=== 2007 election ===
2007 Fife Council election

Dunfermline Central
| Party | Candidate | FPv% | % | Seat | Count |
|---|---|---|---|---|---|
| Labour | Willie Sullivan | 1,881 | 23.9 | 1 | 1 |
| Liberal Democrats | Jackie McKenna | 1,774 | 22.6 | 2 | 1 |
| SNP | Lizz Mogg | 1,574 | 20.0 | 3 | 1 |
| Liberal Democrats | Joe Rosiejak | 1,488 | 19.0 | 4 | 2 |
| Conservative | Lisa Marie Callaghan | 832 | 10.6 | | |
| Scottish Green | Graeme Allan | 313 | 4.0 | | |
