= Howe of Fife and Tay Coast (ward) =

Electoral ward of Fife, Scotland

Location of the ward

Howe of Fife and Tay Coast is one of the 22 wards used to elect members of the Fife council. It elects three Councillors.

== Councillors ==
Election	Councillors		
2007	David MacDiarmid (SNP)	Donald Lothian (Liberal Democrats)	Andrew Arbuckle (Liberal Democrats)
2012	David MacDiarmid (SNP)	Donald Lothian (Liberal Democrats)	Andy Heer (Conservative)
2017	David MacDiarmid (SNP)	Donald Lothian (Liberal Democrats)	Andy Heer (Conservative)
2022	David MacDiarmid (SNP)	Donald Lothian (Liberal Democrats)	Gary Holt (Liberal Democrats)

== Election results ==
=== 2022 Election ===
2022 Fife Council election

Howe of Fife and Tay Coast - 3 seats
Party	Candidate	FPv%	Count					
Party	Candidate	FPv%	1	2	3	4	5	6
SNP	David MacDiarmid (incumbent)	31%	1,871					
Liberal Democrats	Donald Lothian (incumbent)	24%	1,448	1,508.1				
Liberal Democrats	Gary Holt	20.9%	1,261	1,280	1,280.1	1,290.5	1,306.4	1,594.9
Conservative	Andy Heer (incumbent)	14.6%	880	888.7	888.7	905.9	914.7	944.2
Green	Malcolm Jack	7.6%	458	627.8	627.8	637.5	679.4	
Alba	Jackie Anderson	1%	58	91.6	91.6	95.8		
Scottish Family	Alan Brown	0.9%	54	57.9	57.9			
Electorate: 11,317 Valid: 6,030 Spoilt: 74 Quota: 1,508 Turnout: 53.9%
