= Cupar (ward) =

Electoral ward of Fife, Scotland

Location of the ward

Cupar is one of the 22 wards used to elect members of the Fife council. It elects three Councillors.

== Councillors ==
Election	Councillors		
2007	Margaret Kennedy (Liberal Democrats)	Roger Guy (Conservative)	Bryan Poole (Ind.)
2012	Margaret Kennedy (Liberal Democrats)	Karen Marjoram (SNP)	Bryan Poole (Ind.)
2017	Margaret Kennedy (Liberal Democrats)	Karen Marjoram (SNP)	Tony Miklinski (Conservative)
2022	Margaret Kennedy (Liberal Democrats)	Stefan Hoggan-Radu (SNP)	John Caffrey (Liberal Democrats)

== Election results ==
=== 2022 Election ===
2022 Fife Council election

Cupar - 3 seats
Party	Candidate	FPv%	Count					
Party	Candidate	FPv%	1	2	3	4	5	6
Liberal Democrats	Margaret Kennedy (incumbent)	35.4%	2,160					
SNP	Stefan Hoggan-Radu	25.8%	1,571					
Liberal Democrats	John Caffrey	17%	1,036	1,495	1,508.8	1,503.6	1,513.8	1,537.8
Conservative	Tony Miklinski (incumbent)	11.5%	698	766	766.5	770.1	774.4	790.8
Green	Robert Hugh-Jones	4.9%	296	327.2	351.4	361.1	371.9	277.4
Labour	Wendy Haynes	3.4%	206	234.9	238.8	242.4	245.8	250.8
Scottish Family	Sylvia Brown	1.1%	66	69.2	70	71	80.9	
Independent	Donald Adey	0.5%	33	37.1	37.7	51		
Independent	Gordon Pay	0.5%	29	32.8	47.2			
Electorate: 11,439 Valid: 6,095 Spoilt: 56 Quota: 1,524 Turnout: 6,151 (53.8%)

=== 2017 Election ===
2017 Fife Council election

Cupar - 3 seats
Party	Candidate	FPv%	Count			
Party	Candidate	FPv%	1	2	3	4
Liberal Democrats	Margaret Kennedy (incumbent)	40.7	2,401			
Conservative	Tony Miklinski	26.5	1,561			
SNP	Karen Marjoram (incumbent)	18.05	1,064	1,186	1,188.3	1,521.7
SNP	Steven Simpson	6.09	359	381	381.7	
Green	Jenny Collins	4.7	275	456.07	467.3	492.3
Labour	Helen Martin	3.97	234	525.5	548.4	555.8
Electorate: 11,144 Valid: 5,894 Spoilt: 76 Quota: 1,474 Turnout: 5,970 (53.6%)

=== 2012 Election ===
2012 Fife Council election

Cupar - 3 seats
Party	Candidate	FPv%	Count				
Party	Candidate	FPv%	1	2	3	4	5
Independent	Bryan Poole (incumbent)	34.52	1,556				
Liberal Democrats	Margaret Kennedy (incumbent)	21.19	955	1,110.5	1,255.4		
SNP	Karen Marjoram	19.92	898	972.9	1,084.2	1,117.8	1,318.9
Conservative	Roger Guy (incumbent)	16.04	723	801.3	836.2	883.8	
Labour	Freida Loughlan	8.32	375	431.2			
Electorate: 11,170 Valid: 4,507 Spoilt: 36 Quota: 1,127 Turnout: 4,543 (40.35%)

=== 2007 Election ===
2007 Fife Council election

Cupar
Party	Candidate	FPv%	%	Seat	Count
Liberal Democrats	Margaret Kennedy	1,511	24.8	1	2
Independent	Bryan Poole	1,264	20.8	2	4
Conservative	Roger Guy	1,154	18.9	3	4
SNP	Noel Dolan	887	14.6		
Liberal Democrats	Loretta Mordi	887	14.6		
Labour	Jon Dodds	388	6.4		
