= Burntisland, Kinghorn and Western Kirkcaldy (ward) =

Electoral ward of Fife, Scotland

Location of the ward

Burntisland, Kinghorn and Western Kirkcaldy is one of 22 wards used to elect members of Fife Council. The ward elects three Councillors, covering the towns of Burntisland and Kinghorn, the village of Auchtertool, as well as the western outskirts of Kirkcaldy.

== Councillors ==
Election	Councillors		
2007	George Kay (SNP)	Ron Edwards (Labour)	Susan Leslie (Liberal Democrats)
2012	George Kay (SNP)	Peter George (Labour)	Susan Leslie (Liberal Democrats)
2017	Lesley Backhouse (SNP)	Gordon Langlands (Labour)	Kathleen Leslie (Conservative / Labour)
2022	Lesley Backhouse (SNP)	Julie MacDougall (Labour / Reform UK)	Kathleen Leslie (Conservative / Labour)

== Election results ==
=== 2022 Election ===
2022 Fife Council election

Burntisland, Kinghorn and Western Kirkcaldy - 3 seats
Party	Candidate	FPv%	Count								
Party	Candidate	FPv%	1	2	3	4	5	6	7	8	9
SNP	Lesley Backhouse (incumbent)	29.5%	1,735								
Labour	Julie MacDougall	29.4%	1,730								
Conservative	Kathleen Leslie (incumbent)	21%	1,239	1,245.5	1,296.3	1,297.4	1,319.2	1,326.6	1,416.9	1,442.6	1,669.8
SNP	Olaf Stando	8.4%	493	677.7	693.4	699.3	700.4	742.9	771.7	1,018.2	
Green	Claire Luxford	5.7%	336	370.9	398.5	409.4	412.2	427.4	497.5		
Liberal Democrats	Anne O'Brien	3.5%	209	215	293.6	295.4	301.1	309			
Alba	Colin Fraser	1.3%	76	82.3	85.6	97	102.9				
Scottish Family	Garry Downie	0.7%	40	40.8	45.7	49.7					
ISP	Andrew Bentley-Steed	0.6%	33	40.4	42.5						
Electorate: 11,716 Valid: 5,891 Spoilt: 69 Quota: 1,473 Turnout: 50.9%

=== 2017 Election ===
Burntisland, Kinghorn and Western Kirkcaldy - 3 seats
Party	Candidate	FPv%	Count									
Party	Candidate	FPv%	1	2	3	4	5	6	7	8	9	10
Conservative	Kathleen Leslie	25.1	1,479									
SNP	Lesley Backhouse	19.4	1,144	1,144.09	1,145.09	1,177.09	1,192.09	1,283.1	1,710.1			
Liberal Democrats	Susan Leslie (incumbent)	13.6	769	770.8	771.8	799.08	819.9	891.9	909.9	943.9	1,121.1	
Labour	Gordon Langlands	12.9	761	761.8	762.8	818.8	988.9	1,035.01	1,051.02	1,088.7	1,229.7	1,660.1
Independent	Roy Mackie	8.07	475	475.6	479.6	540.9	557.9	610.04	620.04	673.9		
SNP	Stuart MacPhail *	7.3	429	429.03	437.03	440.03	446.04	491.04				
Green	Scott Rutherford	5.3	314	314.1	326.1	331.1	342.2					
Labour	Fiona Sword	4.1	242	242.3	243.3	257.3						
Independent	Peter George (incumbent)	4.06	239	239.6	241.6							
Solidarity	Bill Mair	0.6	36	36								
Electorate: 11,582 Valid: 5,888 Spoilt: 79 Quota: 1,473 Turnout: 5,967 (51.5%)

* = Sitting Councillor for Kirkcaldy Central.

=== 2012 Election ===
Burntisland, Kinghorn and Western Kirkcaldy - 3 seats
Party	Candidate	FPv%	Count								
Party	Candidate	FPv%	1	2	3	4	5	6	7	8	9
Labour	Peter George	27.85	1,331								
SNP	George Kay (incumbent)	25.44	1,216								
Liberal Democrats	Susan Leslie (incumbent)	15.46	739	746.6	748.7	758.7	782.1	830.8	954.2	1,043.4	1,207.5
Labour	Richard Perry	9.83	470	573.4	574.4	583.9	607.1	636.6	657.7	749.7	
SNP	Sally Walsh	7.89	377	380.9	395.2	406.5	421.6	446.9	464.1		
Conservative	Norman Morrison	5.31	254	255.3	255.6	261.7	274.9	334.4			
UKIP	Peter Adams	4.46	213	215.3	215.7	220.7	246.9				
Scottish Senior Citizens	Anne Whyte	2.36	113	116.5	116.9	132.1					
Monster Raving Loony	Louche Lord Lancaster	1.40	67	68.5	68.9						
Electorate: 11,474 Valid: 4,780 Spoilt: 40 Quota: 1,196 Turnout: 4,820 (41.66%)

=== 2007 Election ===
Burntisland, Kinghorn and Western Kirkcaldy
Party	Candidate	FPv%	%	Seat	Count
SNP	George Kay	2,204	37.8	1	1
Labour	Ron Edwards	1,344	23.0	2	2
Liberal Democrats	Susan Leslie	910	15.6	3	5
Labour	Collett Salvona	649	11.1		
Conservative	Jamie Potton	567	9.7		
UKIP	Peter Adams	164	2.8		
