= Buckhaven, Methil and Wemyss Villages (ward) =

Location of the ward

Buckhaven, Methil and Wemyss Villages is one of the 22 wards used to elect members of Fife Council. The ward elects four Councillors, covering the towns of Buckhaven and Methil, as well as the villages of East Wemyss, West Wemyss, and Coaltown of Wemyss.

== Councillors ==
| Election | Councillors | | | |
|---|---|---|---|---|
| 2007 | Arthur Robertson (SNP) | Jim Young (Labour) | Tom Adams (Labour) | Andrew Roger (Ind.) |
| 2012 | John O'Brien (SNP) | Jim Young (Labour) | David Graham (Labour) | Andrew Roger (Ind.) |
| 2017 | John O'Brien (SNP) | Ryan Smart (Labour) | David Graham (Labour) | Ken Caldwell (SNP) |
| 2022 | John O'Brien (SNP) | Thomas Adams (Labour) | David Graham (Labour) | Ken Caldwell (SNP) |
| 2025 by-election | John O'Brien (SNP) | Thomas Adams (Labour) | Anne Marie Caldwell (SNP) | Ken Caldwell (SNP) |

== Election results ==
=== 2025 by-election ===
Buckhaven, Methil and Wemyss Villages by-election (6 November 2025) - 1 seat
| Party | Candidate | FPv% | Count | | | | | |
| Party | Candidate | FPv% | 1 | 2 | 3 | 4 | 5 | 6 |
|---|---|---|---|---|---|---|---|---|
| SNP | Anne Marie Caldwell | 42.6 | 1,594 | 1,604 | 1,608 | 1,646 | 1,674 | 1,900 |
| Reform | Mark Davies | 28.9 | 1,080 | 1,088 | 1,102 | 1,113 | 1,126 | 1,220 |
| Labour | Donna Donnelly | 20.8 | 778 | 779 | 783 | 793 | 826 | |
| Liberal Democrats | Jill Reilly | 2.6 | 99 | 103 | 112 | 119 | | |
| Alba | Christine Watson | 2.2 | 83 | 90 | 92 | | | |
| Conservative | Brian Mills | 1.7 | 64 | 64 | | | | |
| Sovereignty | Kieran Anderson | 1.2 | 45 | | | | | |
| SNP gain from Labour | | | | | | | | |
Valid: 3,743 Spoilt: 31 Quota: 1,872 Turnout: 3,774

=== 2022 Election ===
Buckhaven, Methil and Wemyss Villages - 4 seats
| Party | Candidate | FPv% | Count | | | |
| Party | Candidate | FPv% | 1 | 2 | 3 | 4 |
|---|---|---|---|---|---|---|
| SNP | Ken Caldwell (incumbent) | 30% | 1,532 | | | |
| Labour | David Graham (incumbent) | 24.4% | 1,248 | | | |
| SNP | John O'Brien (incumbent) | 17.4% | 890 | 1,037.4 | | |
| Labour | Thomas Adams | 15.8% | 809 | 838.3 | 881.9 | 1,052.9 |
| Conservative | Brian Mills | 6.5% | 330 | 333.3 | 336.6 | 343.7 |
| Liberal Democrats | Celyn Ashworth | 2.3% | 117 | 119.3 | 127.3 | 130.4 |
| Green | Jerome van Leeuwen | 2.2% | 113 | 124 | 193.6 | 196.7 |
| Alba | Susan Blair | 1.3% | 66 | 75.7 | 99.9 | 102.3 |
Electorate: 13,540 Valid: 5,105 Spoilt: 136 Quota: 1,022 Turnout: 38.7%

=== 2017 Election ===
Buckhaven, Methil and Wemyss Villages - 4 seats
| Party | Candidate | FPv% | Count | | | | | | | | |
| Party | Candidate | FPv% | 1 | 2 | 3 | 4 | 5 | 6 | 7 | 8 | 9 |
|---|---|---|---|---|---|---|---|---|---|---|---|
| Labour | David Graham (incumbent) | 30.4 | 1,661 | | | | | | | | |
| SNP | John O'Brien (incumbent) | 18.1 | 991 | 1,014.9 | 1,015.2 | 1,020.2 | 1,039.9 | 1,059.6 | 1,064.9 | 1,074.5 | 1,161.4 |
| SNP | Ken Caldwell | 15.4 | 842 | 861.1 | 862.1 | 864.1 | 879.5 | 893.8 | 904.1 | 908.7 | 1,444.7 |
| SNP | Leslie Bain | 11.6 | 635 | 646.6 | 648.9 | 653.3 | 664.3 | 673.6 | 682.9 | 686.7 | |
| Conservative | Keith Barton | 9.3 | 507 | 520.3 | 522.9 | 535.4 | 539.7 | 567.04 | | | |
| Labour | Ryan Smart | 9.1 | 498 | 914.5 | 918.8 | 935.6 | 946.6 | 999.4 | 1,195.6 | | |
| Independent | Ronald Hunter | 2.5 | 137 | 148.3 | 184.9 | 195.9 | 214.9 | | | | |
| Green | Stephen Ferguson | 1.4 | 78 | 83.5 | 93.1 | 100.5 | | | | | |
| Liberal Democrats | Rory Roberson | 1.1 | 62 | 69.5 | 70.5 | | | | | | |
| Independent | Eunice Cameron | 1.04 | 57 | 61.8 | | | | | | | |
Electorate: 13,802 Valid: 5,468 Spoilt: 170 Quota: 1,094 Turnout: 5,638 (40.8%)

=== 2012 Election ===
Buckhaven, Methil and Wemyss Villages - 4 seats
| Party | Candidate | FPv% | Count | | | | | | | | |
| Party | Candidate | FPv% | 1 | 2 | 3 | 4 | 5 | 6 | 7 | 8 | 9 |
|---|---|---|---|---|---|---|---|---|---|---|---|
| Labour | David Graham | 28.2 | 1,430 | | | | | | | | |
| Independent | Andrew Rodger (incumbent) | 25.79 | 1,307 | | | | | | | | |
| SNP | John O'Brien | 16.38 | 830 | 859.7 | 902 | 902.9 | 907.1 | 915.2 | 915.6 | 967.3 | 1,394.5 |
| Labour | Jim Young (incumbent) | 14.45 | 732 | 1,024.6 | | | | | | | |
| SNP | Arthur Robertson (incumbent) | 9.67 | 490 | 499.3 | 532.3 | 533 | 534 | 538.2 | 544 | 565.9 | |
| Independent | Ricky Jannetta | 3.02 | 153 | 178 | 253.6 | 255 | 261.3 | 276.6 | 300.3 | | |
| Conservative | Keith Stanley Smith | 1.18 | 60 | 61.2 | 65.9 | 65.9 | 69.8 | 76.6 | | | |
| UKIP | Kris Seunarine | 0.87 | 44 | 46.3 | 54.2 | 54.4 | 57.2 | | | | |
| Liberal Democrats | Lois Lothian | 0.41 | 21 | 23.3 | 26.9 | 27.2 | | | | | |
Electorate: 14,114 Valid: 5,067 Spoilt: 36 Quota: 1,014 Turnout: 5,160 (35.90%)

=== 2007 Election ===
Buckhaven, Methil and Wemyss Villages
| Party | Candidate | FPv% | % | Seat | Count |
|---|---|---|---|---|---|
| Independent | Andrew Rodger | 2,114 | 33.7 | 1 | 1 |
| Labour | Tom Adams | 1,456 | 23.2 | 2 | 1 |
| SNP | Arthur Robertson | 712 | 11.3 | 3 | 11 |
| SNP | Stuart Macphail | 647 | 10.3 | | |
| Labour | Jim Young | 460 | 7.3 | 4 | 11 |
| Independent | John O'Brien | 225 | 3.6 | | |
| Independent | Anne Marie Flack | 195 | 3.1 | | |
| Independent | Ricky Jannetta | 164 | 2.6 | | |
| Liberal Democrats | Lois Lothian | 107 | 1.7 | | |
| Conservative | David Graham Stacey | 97 | 1.5 | | |
| Scottish Socialist | Jim McLean | 53 | 0.8 | | |
| UKIP | Kris Seunarine | 32 | 0.5 | | |
| Independent | William Wallace | 19 | 0.3 | | |
