= 2022 Fife Council election =

Fife Council election

- 5 May 2022

All 75 seats to Fife Council 38 seats needed for a majority
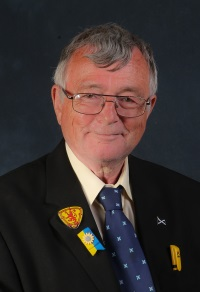

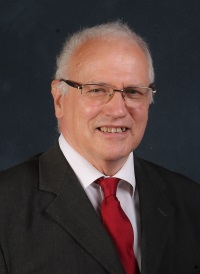

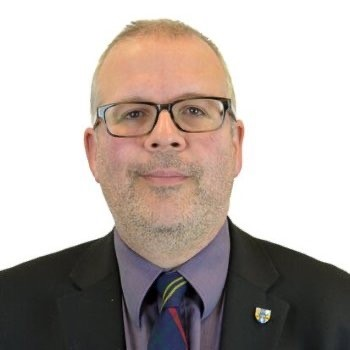

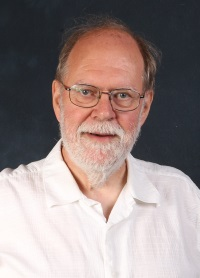
	First party	Second party
Leader	David Alexander	David Ross
Party	SNP	Labour
Leader's seat	Leven, Kennoway and Largo	Kirkcaldy North
Last election	29 seats, 33.8%	24 seats, 23.9%
Seats before	29	23
Seats won	34	20
Seat change	▲5	▼4
Popular vote	46,913	31,102
Percentage	36.9%	24.5%
Swing	▲3.1%	▲0.6%
	Third party	Fourth party
Leader	Jonny Tepp	Dave Dempsey
Party	Liberal Democrats	Conservative
Leader's seat	Tay Bridgehead	Inverkeithing and Dalgety Bay
Last election	7 seats, 13.1%	15 seats, 21.1%
Seats before	7	13
Seats won	13	8
Seat change	▲6	▼7
Popular vote	21,320	18,247
Percentage	16.8%	14.4%
Swing	▲3.7%	▼6.7%
- 2022 Fife Council election results map
Co-leaders before election
David Alexander (SNP) &
David Ross (Labour)
No overall control
Leader after election
David Ross
(Labour)
No overall control

Elections to Fife Council took place on 5 May 2022 on the same day as the 31 other Scottish local government elections. As with other Scottish council elections, it was held using single transferable vote (STV) – a form of proportional representation – in which multiple candidates are elected in each ward and voters rank candidates in order of preference.

For the second consecutive election, the Scottish National Party were returned as the largest party with 34 seats but remained shy of an overall majority. Despite a small increase in vote share, Labour lost four seats but again finished second with 20 councillors. The Liberal Democrats leapfrogged the Conservatives into third place after gaining six seats to hold 13 while the Conservatives lost almost half their number to return eight members. For the second time since the local government reforms in the 1990s, no independent candidates were elected.

With support from the Liberal Democrats and the Conservatives, Labour formed a minority administration to run the council, and David Ross was elected as council leader in his own right, having previously been co-leader after the 2017 election.

== Background ==
=== Previous election ===
At the previous election in 2017, the Scottish National Party (SNP) won the most seats for the first time in a Fife election after gaining three seats to hold 29. Labour lost 11 seats to hold 24 as they were replaced as the largest party. The Conservatives made a net gain of 12 to hold 15 seats while the Liberal Democrats lost three seats to hold seven.

2017 Fife Council election result
Party	Seats	Vote share
SNP	29	33.6%
Labour	24	24.3%
Conservatives	15	20.9%
Liberal Democrats	7	13.0%

=== Electoral system ===
The election used the 22 wards created by the Fifth Statutory Reviews of Electoral Arrangements, with 75 councillors being elected. Each ward elected either 3 or 4 members, using the single transferable vote (STV) electoral system – a form of proportional representation – where candidates are ranked in order of preference.

=== Composition ===
Several changes in the composition of the council occurred between the 2017 and 2022 elections. Most were changes to the political affiliation of councillors including SNP councillor Kate Stewart who left the party to become an independent, Conservative councillor Linda Holt who resigned from the party to become an independent and SNP councillor John Docherty who stood as an independent in the 2022 elections. Three by-elections resulted in a Conservative gain from Labour, an SNP hold and an SNP gain from the Conservatives.

Composition of Fife Council
Party	2017 result	Dissolution
SNP	29	28
Labour	24	23
Conservatives	15	14
Liberal Democrats	7	7
Independent	0	3

=== Retiring councillors ===
Retiring councillors
Council Ward	Party	Departing Councillor
West Fife and Coastal Villages	Conservative	Mino Manekshaw
West Fife and Coastal Villages	Independent	Kate Stewart
West Fife and Coastal Villages	Labour	Bobby McClelland
Dunfermline North	SNP	Ian Ferguson
Dunfermline North	Labour	Helen Law
Dunfermline South	SNP	Fay Sinclair
Rosyth	SNP	Sharon Green-Wilson
Rosyth	Conservative	Tony Orton
Inverkeithing and Dalgety Bay	SNP	Alice McGarry
Burntisland, Kinghorn and Western Kirkcaldy	Labour	Gordon Langlands
Kirkcaldy North	Labour	Neil Crooks
Glenrothes North, Leslie and Markinch	SNP	Fiona Grant
Glenrothes North, Leslie and Markinch	Conservative	Michael Green
Glenrothes Central and Thornton	SNP	Vikki Wilton
Tay Bridgehead	Liberal Democrats	Tim Brett
Tay Bridgehead	SNP	Bill Connor
St Andrews	Labour	Brian Thompson
St Andrews	Conservative	Dominic Nolan
East Neuk and Landward	Liberal Democrats	Bill Porteous
Cupar	SNP	Karen Marjoram
Buckhaven, Methil and Wemyss Villages	Labour	Ryan Smart

=== Candidates ===
The total number of candidates fell from 185 in 2017 to 179. As was the case five years previous, the SNP fielded the highest number of candidates at 39 (six less than in 2017) across the 22 wards. Both Labour and the Conservatives also fielded at least one candidate in every ward, but the 32 candidates fielded by Labour was four less than in 2017, whereas the Conservatives increased their total number of candidates from 22 to 23. The Liberal Democrats contested all but one ward, fielding a total of 26 candidates (up two from 2017). The Greens also contested all but one ward however, the 21 candidates fielded by the party were three less than the previous election. The number of independent candidates contesting the election fell from 29 in 2017 to just eight. As with the previous election, both the Libertarians and the United Kingdom Independence Party (UKIP) fielded a single candidate. For the first time, the Scottish Family Party (14), the Alba Party (11), the Independence for Scotland Party (ISP) (one), the Trade Unionist and Socialist Coalition (TUSC) (one) and Sovereignty (one) fielded candidates in a Fife election. Neither Solidarity nor the British Unionist Party (BUP), who had contested the 2017 election, fielded any candidates.

== Election results ==
2022 Fife local election result
Party	Seats	Gains	Losses	Net gain/loss	Seats %	Votes %	Votes	+/−
SNP	34	5	0	▲5	35.3	36.9	46,913	▲3.1
Labour	20	0	4	▼4	26.7	24.5	31,102	▲0.6
Liberal Democrats	13	6	0	▲6	17.3	16.8	21,320	▲3.7
Conservative	8	1	8	▼7	10.7	14.4	18,247	▼6.7
Green	0	0	0	Steady	0.0	4.6	5,854	▲1.2
Independent	0	0	0	Steady	0.0	1.1	1,429	▼3.3
Alba	0	0	0	Steady	0.0	0.8	1,059	New
Scottish Family	0	0	0	Steady	0.0	0.8	1,035	New
TUSC	0	0	0	Steady	0.0	0.0	53	New
UKIP	0	0	0	Steady	0.0	0.0	45	Steady
Sovereignty	0	0	0	Steady	0.0	0.0	41	New
ISP	0	0	0	Steady	0.0	0.0	33	New
Scottish Libertarian	0	0	0	Steady	0.0	0.0	23	Steady
Total	75						127,154	

Note: Votes are the sum of first preference votes across all council wards. The net gain/loss and percentage changes relate to the result of the previous Scottish local elections on 4 May 2017. This is because STV has an element of proportionality which is not present unless multiple seats are being elected. This may differ from other published sources showing gain/loss relative to seats held at the dissolution of Scotland's councils.

=== Ward summary ===
Results of the 2022 Fife Council election by ward
Ward	%	Cllrs	%	Cllrs	%	Cllrs	%	Cllrs	%	Cllrs	Total Cllrs
Ward	SNP		Lab		Lib Dem		Con		Others		Total Cllrs
West Fife and Coastal Villages	39.1	1	32.5	1	6.7	0	17.1	1	7.9	0	3
Dunfermline North	36.2	1	28.5	1	6.4	0	17.4	1	8.2	0	3
Dunfermline Central	33.4	2	24.6	1	24.7	1	9.4	0	7.9	0	4
Dunfermline South	33.5	2	23.2	1	19.5	1	10.6	0	6.2	0	4
Rosyth	39.4	2	26.3	1	6.5	0	16.8	0	11.1	0	3
Inverkeithing and Dalgety Bay	38.8	2	18.5	1	4.0	0	29.2	1	9.4	0	3
Cowdenbeath	36.6	2	38.0	1	1.4	0	28.9	1	5.0	0	4
Lochgelly, Cardenden and Benarty	43.2	2	43.6	2	1.8	0	7.7	0	3.8	0	4
Burntisland, Kinghorn and Western Kirkcaldy	37.9	1	29.4	1	3.5	0	21.0	1	8.3	0	3
Kirkcaldy North	38.9	1	39.0	1			15.2	1	6.8	0	3
Kirkcaldy Central	37.9	1	41.6	2	2.5	0	13.6	0	4.4	0	3
Kirkcaldy East	40.3	2	39.7	1	2.9	0	11.7	0	5.3	0	3
Glenrothes West and Kinglassie	49.5	2	32.5	1	3.8	0	11.6	0	2.6	0	3
Glenrothes North, Leslie and Markinch	44.6	2	26.4	1	5.1	0	18.6	1	5.3	0	4
Glenrothes Central and Thornton	48.7	2	27.9	1	3.9	0	12.1	0	7.4	0	3
Howe of Fife and Tay Coast	31.0	1			44.9	2	14.6	0	9.5	0	3
Tay Bridgehead	28.4	1	4.3	0	48.2	2	8.4	0	10.7	0	3
St Andrews	22.2	1	8.4	0	48.1	2	14.7	1	6.6	0	4
East Neuk and Landward	25.1	1	2.6	0	45.8	2	13.2	0	14.2	0	3
Cupar	25.8	1	3.4	0	52.4	2	11.5	0	7.0	0	3
Leven, Kennoway and Largo	42.4	2	24.7	1	19.3	1	10.4	0	4.5	0	4
Buckhaven, Methil and Wemyss Villages	47.4	2	40.8	2	2.3	0	6.5	0	3.5	0	4
Total	36.9	34	24.5	20	16.8	13	14.4	8	7.5	0	75

=== Seats changing hands ===
Below is a list of seats which elected a different party or parties from 2017 in order to highlight the change in political composition of the council from the previous election. The list does not include defeated incumbents who resigned or defected from their party and subsequently failed re-election while the party held the seat.

Seats changing hands
Seat	2017		2022	
Seat	Party	Member	Party	Member
Dunfermline Central	Labour	Garry Haldane	Liberal Democrats	Aude Boubaker-Calder
Dunfermline South	Conservative	David Ross	SNP	Naz Anis-Miah
Rosyth	Conservative	Tony Orton	SNP	Andy Jackson
Inverkeithing and Dalgety Bay	Conservative	Dave Coleman	SNP	Sarah Neal
Cowdenbeath	Labour	Gary Guichan	SNP	Bailey-Lee Robb
Kirkcaldy North	Labour	Neil Crooks	Conservative	James Leslie
Kirkcaldy East	Conservative	Richard Watt	SNP	Nicola Patrick
Howe of Fife and Tay Coast	Conservative	Andy Heer	Liberal Democrats	Gary Holt
St Andrews	Labour	Brian Thompson	Liberal Democrats	Al Clark
East Neuk and Landward	Conservative	Linda Holt	Liberal Democrats	Sean Dillon
Cupar	Conservative	Tony Miklinski	Liberal Democrats	John Caffrey
Leven, Kennoway and Largo	Conservative	Graham Ritchie	Liberal Democrats	Eugene Clarke

Notes

1. Note 1: In 2017, Linda Holt was elected as a Conservative candidate but subsequently resigned from the party.

== Ward results ==
=== West Fife and Coastal Villages ===
Labour, the SNP and the Conservatives retained the seats they had won at the previous election.

West Fife and Coastal Villages - 3 seats
Party	Candidate	FPv%	Count									
Party	Candidate	FPv%	1	2	3	4	5	6	7	8	9	10
Labour	Graeme Downie	24.9	1,482	1,487	1,492							
SNP	Sam Steele	21.8	1,301	1,307	1,330	1,330	1,336	1,417	1,448	1,509		
Conservative	Conner Young	17.1	1,017	1,020	1,020	1,020	1,056	1,062	1,179	1,286	1,286	1,425
SNP	Katie Strang	14.0	837	843	860	860	865	933	961	1,012	1,027	
Labour	Jacqueline McKenna	7.7	458	458	461	461	471	501	640			
Liberal Democrats	Jo Cockburn	6.7	399	402	406	406	418	460				
Green	Craig McCutcheon	4.1	246	251	264	264	273					
Scottish Family	Danny Smith	1.6	94	97	107	107						
Alba	William Gavin	1.4	83	92								
Independent	Martin Keatings	0.8	46									
Electorate: 13,553 Valid: 5,963 Spoilt: 129 Quota: 1,491 Turnout: 44.9%

=== Dunfermline North ===
Labour, the SNP and the Conservatives retained the seats they had won at the previous election.

Dunfermline North - 3 seats
Party	Candidate	FPv%	Count							
Party	Candidate	FPv%	1	2	3	4	5	6	7	8
Labour	Gordon Pryde	28.5	1,627							
SNP	Auxi Barrera	23.6	1,350	1,360	1,365	1,368	1,509			
Conservative	Gavin Ellis (incumbent)	17.8	1,017	1,049	1,059	1,084	1,107	1,108	1,365	1,474
SNP	Craig McIvor	15.4	882	896	897	903	973	1,042	1,120	
Liberal Democrats	Caroline McIlwraith	6.4	363	421	432	448	535	538		
Green	Mags Hall	5.9	338	354	372	387				
Scottish Family	Karen Smith	1.4	80	86	93					
TUSC	Dave Edler	0.9	53	66						
Electorate: 12,503 Valid: 5,710 Spoilt: 79 Quota: 1,428 Turnout: 46.3%

=== Dunfermline Central ===
Labour retained one of the two seats they had won at the previous election while the SNP and Conservatives retained their seats and the Liberal Democrats gained one seat from Labour.

Dunfermline Central - 4 seats
Party	Candidate	FPv%	Count							
Party	Candidate	FPv%	1	2	3	4	5	6	7	8
Liberal Democrats	Aude Boubaker-Calder	24.7	1,970							
SNP	Derek Glen (incumbent)	20.1	1,603							
SNP	Jean Hall Muir (incumbent)	13.3	1,057	1,075	1,081	1,081	1,119	1,388	1,405	1,486
Labour	Jim Leishman (incumbent)	13.2	1,055	1,139	1,139	1,155	1,171	1,243	1,473	2,367
Labour	Garry Haldane (incumbent)	11.4	909	977	978	983	992	1,056	1,216	
Conservative	Malcolm Macaulay	9.4	752	841	841	856	861	878		
Green	Lewis Campbell	6.0	478	519	520	526	538			
Alba	Leanne Tervit	1.2	94	95	95	101				
Scottish Family	Gary Pratt	0.7	53	56	56					
Electorate: 16,854 Valid: 7,971 Spoilt: 100 Quota: 1,595 Turnout: 47.9%

=== Dunfermline South ===
The Liberal Democrats, Labour and the SNP retained the seats they had won at the previous election while the SNP also gained one seat from the Conservatives.

Dunfermline South - 4 seats
Party	Candidate	FPv%	Count								
Party	Candidate	FPv%	1	2	3	4	5	6	7	8	9
Liberal Democrats	James Calder (incumbent)	19.5	1,523	1,528	1,542	1,586					
Labour	Cara Hilton	19.3	1,505	1,508	1,513	1,550	1,558	1,794			
SNP	Lynn Ballantyne Wardlaw	16.9	1,316	1,340	1,344	1,408	1,410	1,425	1,446	1,543	1,601
SNP	Naz Anis-Miah	16.6	1,292	1,308	1,314	1,382	1,383	1,390	1,409	1,534	1,568
Conservative	David Ross (incumbent)	10.6	825	826	846	855	860	878	917	1,008	
Independent	Martin Willcocks	6.9	541	564	580	611	613	619	641		
Labour	Ross Paterson (incumbent)	3.9	304	308	846	327	328				
Green	Tom Freeman	3.6	279	288	295						
Scottish Family	Paul Lynch	1.3	105	112							
Alba	Rob Thompson	1.3	103								
Electorate: 17,563 Valid: 7,793 Spoilt: 92 Quota: 1,559 Turnout: 44.9%

=== Rosyth ===
The SNP and Labour retained the seats they had won at the previous election while the SNP also gained one seat from the Conservatives.

Rosyth - 3 seats
Party	Candidate	FPv%	Count								
Party	Candidate	FPv%	1	2	3	4	5	6	7	8	9
Labour	Andrew Verrecchia (incumbent)	26.3	1,274								
SNP	Brian Goodall	22.4	1,085	1,088	1,089	1,092	1,139	1,232			
SNP	Andy Jackson	17.0	826	829	831	833	883	955	973	1,032	1,120
Conservative	Grant Thomson	16.8	813	824	830	854	871	884	884	1,000	
Liberal Democrats	Teresa Little	6.5	316	333	336	347	366	422	422		
Green	Fiona McOwan	5.2	250	254	259	268	290				
Alba	Stephen Lynas	4.0	192	194	196	203					
Scottish Family	Alastair Macintyre	1.4	69	70	77						
Scottish Libertarian	George Morton	0.5	23	23							
Electorate: 11,736 Valid: 4,848 Spoilt: 82 Quota: 1,213 Turnout: 42.0%

=== Inverkeithing and Dalgety Bay ===
The SNP (2), Labour (1) and the Conservatives (1) retained the seats they had won at the previous election.

Inverkeithing and Dalgety Bay - 4 seats
Party	Candidate	FPv%	Count							
Party	Candidate	FPv%	1	2	3	4	5	6	7	8
SNP	David Barratt (incumbent)	28.4	2,187							
Labour	Patrick Browne	18.5	1,426	1,467	1,471	1,612				
Conservative	Dave Dempsey (incumbent)	17.6	1,355	1,380	1,401	1,446	1,456	1,494	1,519	2,430
Conservative	Dave Coleman (incumbent)	11.6	897	908	923	939	950	990	1,014	
SNP	Sarah Neal	10.4	802	1,262	1,273	1,296	1,302	1,763		
Green	Ryan Blackadder	8.2	634	709	728	791	807			
Liberal Democrats	Callum Hawthorne	4.0	309	316	329					
Scottish Family	Sarah Davis	1.2	93	95						
Electorate: 14,541 Valid: 7,703 Spoilt: 110 Quota: 1,541 Turnout: 53.7%

=== Cowdenbeath ===
The SNP and the Conservatives retained the seats they had won at the previous election while Labour retained one of their two seats and the SNP gained one seat from Labour.

Cowdenbeath - 4 seats
Party	Candidate	FPv%	Count								
Party	Candidate	FPv%	1	2	3	4	5	6	7	8	9
Labour	Alex Campbell (incumbent)	30.6	2,028								
SNP	Alie Bain (incumbent)	28.9	1,916								
Conservative	Darren Watt (incumbent)	18.9	1,256	1,309	1,320	1,346					
SNP	Bailey-Lee Robb	7.7	513	543.8	1,001	1,009	1,010	1,047	1,054	1,162	1,381
Labour	Gary Guichan (incumbent)	7.4	489	992	1,020	1,034	1,040	1,055	1,094	1,158	
Green	Alyssa Lee	2.5	169	179	207	217	218	237	260		
Liberal Democrats	Peter Venturi	1.4	96	106	108	113	116	120			
Alba	Jacqueline Bijster	1.3	85	92	110	115	116				
Scottish Family	Helen Grieg	1.2	80	90	96						
Electorate: 17,132 Valid: 6,632 Spoilt: 182 Quota: 1,327 Turnout: 39.8%

=== Lochgelly, Cardenden and Benarty ===
The SNP (2) and Labour (2) retained the seats they had won at the previous election.

Lochgelly, Cardenden and Benarty - 4 seats
Party	Candidate	FPv%	Count		
Party	Candidate	FPv%	1	2	3
Labour	Mary Bain-Lockhart (incumbent)	24.9	1,230		
SNP	Rosemary Liewald (incumbent)	23.7	1,173		
SNP	Lea McLelland (incumbent)	19.5	965	983	1,143
Labour	Linda Erskine (incumbent)	18.7	925	1,115	
Conservative	Margaret Fairgrieve	7.7	379	385	385
Green	Danny Oswald	2.3	115	117	125
Liberal Democrats	Russel McPhate	1.8	88	94	95
Scottish Family	Anil Alexander	1.5	72	74	75
Electorate: 14,192 Valid: 4,947 Spoilt: 125 Quota: 990 Turnout: 35.7%

=== Burntisland, Kinghorn and Western Kirkcaldy ===
The SNP, Labour and the Conservatives retained the seats they had won at the previous election.

Burntisland, Kinghorn and Western Kirkcaldy - 3 seats
Party	Candidate	FPv%	Count								
Party	Candidate	FPv%	1	2	3	4	5	6	7	8	9
SNP	Lesley Backhouse (incumbent)	29.5	1,735								
Labour	Julie MacDougall	29.4	1,730								
Conservative	Kathleen Leslie (incumbent)	21.0	1,239	1,245	1,296	1,297	1,319	1,326	1,416	1,442	1,669
SNP	Olaf Stando	8.4	493	677	693	699	700	742	771	1,018	
Green	Claire Luxford	5.7	336	370	398	409	412	427	497		
Liberal Democrats	Anne O'Brien	3.5	209	215	293	295	301	309			
Alba	Colin Fraser	1.3	76	82	85	97	102				
Scottish Family	Garry Downie	0.7	40	40	45	49					
ISP	Andrew Bentley-Steed	0.6	33	40	42						
Electorate: 11,716 Valid: 5,891 Spoilt: 69 Quota: 1,473 Turnout: 50.9%

=== Kirkcaldy North ===
The SNP retained the seat they had won at the previous election while Labour held one of their two seats and the Conservatives gained one seat from Labour.

Kirkcaldy North - 3 seats
Party	Candidate	FPv%	Count							
Party	Candidate	FPv%	1	2	3	4	5	6	7	8
Labour	David Ross (incumbent)	34.9	1,804							
SNP	Carol Lindsay (incumbent)	32.1	1,661							
Conservative	James Leslie	15.2	789	812	813	828	838	855	1,029	1,187
SNP	Sally Walsh	6.8	352	360	669	672	710	821	936	
Labour	Ryan Smart (Note: Sitting councillor for Buckhaven, Methil and Wemyss Villages)	4.1	213	641	652	661	672	731		
Green	Michael Collie	3.9	204	212	226	231	254			
Alba	Craig Dempsey	2.0	101	101	108	112				
UKIP	Gerald Haddrell	0.9	45	46	46					
Electorate: 12,519 Valid: 5,169 Spoilt: 100 Quota: 1,293 Turnout: 42.1%

=== Kirkcaldy Central ===
Labour (2) and the SNP (1) retained the seats they had won at the previous election.

Kirkcaldy Central - 3 seats
Party	Candidate	FPv%	Count						
Party	Candidate	FPv%	1	2	3	4	5	6	7
SNP	Blair Allan	22.0	1,005	1,010	1,047	1,064	1,069	1,071	1,800
Labour	Alistair Cameron (incumbent)	21.6	984	1,004	1,030	1,186			
Labour	Judy Hamilton (incumbent)	20.0	915	938	977	1,158			
SNP	Zoe Hisbent (incumbent)	15.8	723	725	800	809	813	815	
Conservative	Graham Duncan	13.6	619	642	652				
Green	Tao Macleod	4.4	203	224					
Liberal Democrats	Karen Utting	2.5	115						
Electorate: 11,394 Valid: 4,564 Spoilt: 106 Quota: 1,142 Turnout: 41%

=== Kirkcaldy East ===
The SNP and Labour retained the seats they had won at the previous election while the SNP also gained one seat from the Conservatives.

Kirkcaldy East - 3 seats
Party	Candidate	FPv%	Count							
Party	Candidate	FPv%	1	2	3	4	5	6	7	8
Labour	Ian Cameron (incumbent)	32.9	1,313							
SNP	Rod Cavanagh (incumbent)	23.1	924	944	950	955	1,011			
SNP	Nicola Patrick	17.2	687	693	696	702	772	782	793	931
Conservative	Richard Watt (incumbent)	11.7	469	475	480	516	524	524		
Labour	George Macdonald	6.8	273	510	512	539	578	579	774	
Green	David Hansen	4.3	172	180	186	211				
Liberal Democrats	Wink Thompson	2.9	116	123	133					
Sovereignty	Walter Neilson	1.0	41	43						
Electorate: 11,052 Valid: 3,995 Spoilt: 130 Quota: 999 Turnout: 37.3%

=== Glenrothes West and Kinglassie ===
The SNP (2) and Labour (1) retained the seats they had won at the previous election.

Glenrothes West and Kinglassie - 3 seats
Party	Candidate	FPv%	Count				
Party	Candidate	FPv%	1	2	3	4	5
SNP	Julie Ford (incumbent)	37.9	1,740				
Labour	Altany Craik (incumbent)	32.5	1,491				
SNP	Craig Walker (incumbent)	11.6	533	1,059	1,104	1,138	1,186
Conservative	David Croll	11.6	531	537	613	639	745
Liberal Democrats	Keith Smith	3.8	174	182	275	327	
Independent	Ian Robertson	2.6	119	128	163		
Electorate: 12,068 Valid: 4,588 Spoilt: 103 Quota: 1,148 Turnout: 38.9%

=== Glenrothes North, Leslie and Markinch ===
The SNP (2), Labour (1) and the Conservatives (1) retained the seats they had won at the previous election.

Glenrothes North, Leslie and Markinch - 4 seats
Party	Candidate	FPv%	Count							
Party	Candidate	FPv%	1	2	3	4	5	6	7	8
SNP	John Beare (incumbent)	27.7	1,730							
Conservative	Peter Gulline	18.6	1,161	1,166	1,168	1,198	1,203	1,296		
SNP	Lynn Mowatt	16.9	1,059	1,433						
Labour	Jan Wincott (incumbent)	15.0	940	951	973	984	1,026	1,106	1,118	1,853
Labour	Afifa Khanam	11.4	714	727	737	747	806	906	917	
Liberal Democrats	Frances Bennie	5.1	318	329	338	351	422			
Green	Bryce Goodall	3.6	224	256	320	342				
Scottish Family	George Carratt	1.7	109	112	117					
Electorate: 14,432 Valid: 6,255 Spoilt: 116 Quota: 1,252 Turnout: 44.1%

=== Glenrothes Central and Thornton ===
The SNP (2) and Labour (1) retained the seats they had won at the previous election.

Glenrothes Central and Thornton - 3 seats
Party	Candidate	FPv%	Count					
Party	Candidate	FPv%	1	2	3	4	5	6
SNP	Ross Vettraino (incumbent)	34.1	1,588					
Labour	Derek Noble (incumbent)	27.9	1,299					
SNP	Daniel Wilson	14.6	679	1,046	1,063	1,067	1,114	1,220
Conservative	Heather Gulline	12.1	561	566	585	607	620	631
Liberal Democrats	Jane Kerr	3.9	183	188	223	231	246	297
Green	Morven Ovenstone-Jones	3.7	170	180	191	207	221	
Alba	Jim Bryce	2.2	101	105	109	116		
Scottish Family	Steve Saunders	1.5	71	73	80			
Electorate: 12,021 Valid: 4,652 Spoilt: 90 Quota: 1,164 Turnout: 39.4%

=== Howe of Fife and Tay Coast ===
The Liberal Democrats and the SNP retained the seats they had won at the previous election while the Liberal Democrats also gained one seat from the Conservatives.

Howe of Fife and Tay Coast - 3 seats
Party	Candidate	FPv%	Count					
Party	Candidate	FPv%	1	2	3	4	5	6
SNP	David MacDiarmid (incumbent)	31.0	1,871					
Liberal Democrats	Donald Lothian (incumbent)	24.0	1,448	1,508				
Liberal Democrats	Gary Holt	20.9	1,261	1,280	1,280	1,290	1,306	1,594
Conservative	Andy Heer (incumbent)	14.6	880	888	888	905	914	944
Green	Malcolm Jack	7.6	458	627	627	637	679	
Alba	Jackie Anderson	1.0	58	91	91	95		
Scottish Family	Alan Brown	0.9	54	57	57			
Electorate: 11,317 Valid: 6,030 Spoilt: 74 Quota: 1,508 Turnout: 53.9%

=== Tay Bridgehead ===
The Liberal Democrats (2) and the SNP (1) retained the seats they had won at the previous election.

Tay Bridgehead - 3 seats
Party	Candidate	FPv%	Count					
Party	Candidate	FPv%	1	2	3	4	5	6
SNP	Louise Kennedy-Dalby	28.4	1,783					
Liberal Democrats	Jonny Tepp (incumbent)	26.9	1,692					
Liberal Democrats	Allan Knox	21.2	1,333	1,362	1,461	1,470	1,531	1,654
Conservative	Keith Barton	8.4	527	528	534	535	559	582
Green	Colin Palmer	6.3	397	500	506	553	588	676
Labour	Philip Thompson	4.3	271	287	292	305	341	
Independent	Sean Elder	2.8	177	184	186	214		
Alba	Steven Simpson	1.6	100	120	120			
Electorate: 11,925 Valid: 6,280 Spoilt: 56 Quota: 1,571 Turnout: 53.1%

=== St Andrews ===
The Liberal Democrats, the SNP and the Conservatives retained the seats they had won at the previous election while the Liberal Democrats also gained one seat from Labour.

St Andrews - 4 Seats
Party	Candidate	FPv%	Count					
Party	Candidate	FPv%	1	2	3	4	5	6
Liberal Democrats	Jane Liston (incumbent)	25.1	1,265					
Liberal Democrats	Al Clark	23.0	1,161					
SNP	Ann Verner (incumbent)	22.2	1,123					
Conservative	Robin Lawson	14.7	742	800	841	844	860	1,120
Labour	Rosalind Garton	8.4	422	493	535	554	842	
Green	Fergus Cook	6.6	335	385	408	468		
Electorate: 12,106 Valid: 5,048 Spoilt: 37 Quota: 1,010 Turnout: 42%

=== East Neuk and Landward ===
The Liberal Democrats and the SNP retained the seats they had won at the previous election while the Liberal Democrats also gained one seat from the Conservatives. Independent candidates Linda Holt and John Docherty were elected as Conservative and SNP candidates respectively in 2017.

East Neuk and Landward - 3 seats
Party	Candidate	FPv%	Count						
Party	Candidate	FPv%	1	2	3	4	5	6	7
Liberal Democrats	Fiona Corps	32.1	1,721						
SNP	Alycia Hayes	25.1	1,345						
Conservative	Debbie MacCallum	13.2	707	724	724	731	744	748	848
Liberal Democrats	Sean Dillon	12.7	679	998	999	1,015	1,063	1,203	1,425
Independent	Linda Holt (incumbent)	7.5	404	417	417	455	469	516	
Green	David Stutchfield	5.2	281	291	293	303	339		
Labour	Stuart Irwin	2.6	139	143	143	146			
Independent	John Docherty (incumbent)	1.5	80	84	84				
Electorate: 10,467 Valid: 5,356 Spoilt: 58 Quota: 1,340 Turnout: 51.7%

=== Cupar ===
The Liberal Democrats and the SNP retained the seats they had won at the previous election while the Liberal Democrats also gained one seat from the Conservatives.

Cupar - 3 seats
Party	Candidate	FPv%	Count					
Party	Candidate	FPv%	1	2	3	4	5	6
Liberal Democrats	Margaret Kennedy (incumbent)	35.4	2,160					
SNP	Stefan Hoggan-Radu	25.8	1,571					
Liberal Democrats	John Caffrey	17.0	1,036	1,495	1,501	1,503	1,513	1,537
Conservative	Tony Miklinski (incumbent)	11.5	698	766	766	770	774	790
Green	Robert Hugh-Jones	4.9	296	327	351	361	371	277
Labour	Wendy Haynes	3.4	206	234	238	242	245	250
Scottish Family	Sylvia Brown	1.1	66	69	70	71	80	
Independent	Donald Adey	0.5	33	37	37	51		
Independent	Gordon Pay	0.5	29	32	33			
Electorate: 11,439 Valid: 6,095 Spoilt: 56 Quota: 1,524 Turnout: 53.8%

=== Leven, Kennoway and Largo ===
The SNP (2) and Labour (1) retained the seats they had won at the previous election while the Liberal Democrats gained one seat from the Conservatives.

Leven, Kennoway and Largo - 4 seats
Party	Candidate	FPv%	Count		
Party	Candidate	FPv%	1	2	3
SNP	David Alexander (incumbent)	31.7	2,077		
Labour	Colin Davidson (incumbent)	20.6	1,348		
Liberal Democrats	Eugene Clarke	19.3	1,268	1,307	1,312
SNP	Alistair Suttie (incumbent)	10.8	707	1,323	
Conservative	Graham Ritchie (incumbent)	10.4	683	686	688
Labour	Jacob Winton	4.1	271	287	310
Green	Iain Morrice	2.4	156	199	200
Scottish Family	Davina Saunders	0.7	49	52	53
Electorate: 15,245 Valid: 6,559 Spoilt: 128 Quota: 1,312 Turnout: 43.9%

=== Buckhaven, Methil and Wemyss Villages ===
The SNP (2) and Labour (2) retained the seats they had won at the previous election.

Buckhaven, Methil and Wemyss Villages - 4 seats
Party	Candidate	FPv%	Count			
Party	Candidate	FPv%	1	2	3	4
SNP	Ken Caldwell (incumbent)	30.0	1,532			
Labour	David Graham (incumbent)	24.4	1,248			
SNP	John O'Brien (incumbent)	17.4	890	1,307		
Labour	Thomas Adams	15.8	809	838	881	1,052
Conservative	Brian Mills	6.5	330	333	336	343
Liberal Democrats	Celyn Ashworth	2.3	117	119	127	130
Green	Jerome van Leeuwen	2.2	113	124	193	196
Alba	Susan Blair	1.3	66	75	99	102
Electorate: 13,540 Valid: 5,105 Spoilt: 136 Quota: 1,022 Turnout: 38.7%

== Aftermath ==
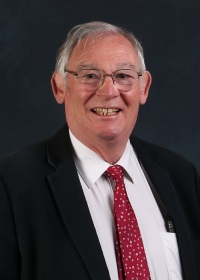
Provost Jim Leishman

On 19 May 2022, a Labour-minority council was backed by 41 votes to 34, with Liberal Democrat and Conservative councillors voting for it. Labour denied forming a coalition with either the Lib Dems or the Conservatives but said they would need the support of others in the council to provide an effective administration. A social media post put out by the local authority explaining how the three Unionist parties had voted together was later edited to remove any reference to different parties. SNP group leader, Councillor David Alexander, said that this outcome was "trampling on democracy" and said there was "no coherent defence for this gerrymandered motion" given that the SNP had won the most seats. Labour group leader Cllr David Ross was elected as council leader having previously been co-leader with Cllr Alexander prior to the election and Cllr Jim Leishman was re-elected as Provost.

Cllr David Graham, councillor for the Buckhaven, Methil and Wemyss villages, was suspended by Labour in August 2023 after he was arrested and subsequently charged over allegations of child sex offences. He appeared in court in connection with the allegations in September 2023. In August 2025, he was convicted and sentenced to 27 months in prison, making him ineligible to continue as a councillor.

In June 2024, Burntisland, Kinghorn and Western Kirkcaldy Labour councillor Julie MacDougall resigned from the party in protest over the way the party had selected candidates for the 2024 United Kingdom general election which she said was "blocking good local people" from standing. In August 2025, she defected to Reform UK.

Cllr Robin Lawson, Conservative councillor for St Andrews, resigned from the party in May 2025. He was reported to have joined Reform in a personal capacity and was listed as an independent councillor.

Conservative councillor for Dunfermline North Gavin Ellis defected to Reform in September 2025.

In March 2026, SNP councillor Stefan Hoggan resigned from the party for "personal reasons". He had been due to stand for the party in the Fife North East constituency at the 2026 Scottish Parliament election. It was later revealed that he had quit the party after a complaint had been made against him and a police investigation into alleged sexual offences subsequently began.

Former Conservative group leader Kathleen Leslie, councillor for Burntisland, Kinghorn and Western Kirkcaldy, defected to Labour in July 2026 as she was "uncomfortable" with Conservative policies around migration and foreign policy and that Labour was a "better fit" for her. Later that month, Cowdenbeath councillor Darren Watt resigned from the Conservatives to become an independent. In August 2026, the Conservative group were reported to be in turmoil after Cllr James Leslie resigned from the party to sit as an independent.

=== West Fife and Coastal Villages by-election ===
Following his successful campaign during the 2024 United Kingdom general election, West Fife and Coastal Villages councillor Graeme Downie – who was elected as MP for Dunfermline and Dollar – resigned his council seat in September 2024. A by-election took place on 28 November 2024 with Labour successfully retaining the seat.

West Fife and Coastal Villages by-election (28 November 2024) - 1 seat
Party	Candidate	FPv%	Count						
Party	Candidate	FPv%	1	2	3	4	5	6	7
Labour	Karen Beaton	33.1	881	882	890	921	1,010	1,147	1,474
SNP	Paul Steele	33.1	879	887	896	944	985	1,015	
Conservative	David Ross	16.0	426	434	444	449	516		
Liberal Democrats	Paul Buchanan-Quigley	8.5	227	232	246	279			
Green	Fiona McOwan	4.8	128	130	141				
Independent	George Morton	2.4	64	77					
Scottish Family	Danny Smith	1.9	53						
Electorate: 13,577 Valid: 2,658 Spoilt: 26 Quota: 1,330 Turnout: 19.8%

=== Glenrothes Central and Thornton by-election ===
In February 2025, Glenrothes Central and Thornton councillor Ross Vettraino died. The subsequent by-election was won by Lynda Holton, who held the seat for the SNP.

Glenrothes Central and Thornton by-election (24 April 2025) - 1 seat
Party	Candidate	FPv%	Count			
Party	Candidate	FPv%	1	2	3	4
SNP	Lynda Holton	47.6	1,439	1,451	1,489	1,623
Labour	Maciej Dokurno	21.5	649	674	753	878
Reform	Ian Smith	17.9	541	591	652	
Liberal Democrats	Ed Scotcher	6.8	207	257		
Conservative	Fiona Leslie	6.1	185			
Electorate: 12,623 Valid: 3,021 Spoilt: 63 Quota: 1,511 Turnout: 24.2%

=== Buckhaven, Methil and Wemyss Villages by-election ===
In August 2025, incumbent Labour councillor David Graham was sentenced to 27 months in prison for child sexual abuse, making him ineligible to remain a councillor. The by-election to fill his seat was held on 6 November 2025 and won by Anne Marie Caldwell of the SNP.

Buckhaven, Methil and Wemyss Villages by-election (6 November 2025) - 1 seat
Party	Candidate	FPv%	Count					
Party	Candidate	FPv%	1	2	3	4	5	6
SNP	Anne Marie Caldwell	42.6	1,594	1,604	1,608	1,646	1,674	1,900
Reform	Mark Davies	28.9	1,080	1,088	1,102	1,113	1,126	1,220
Labour	Donna Donnelly	20.8	778	779	783	793	826	
Liberal Democrats	Jill Reilly	2.6	99	103	112	119		
Alba	Christine Watson	2.2	83	90	92			
Conservative	Brian Mills	1.7	64	64				
Sovereignty	Kieran Anderson	1.2	45					
Electorate: 13,830 Valid: 3,743 Spoilt: 31 Quota: 1,872 Turnout: 27.3%

=== Glenrothes West and Kinglassie by-election ===
Former Depute Provost Julie Ford announced the "difficult decision" to stand down as a councillor as she was no longer able to give the job "my all" in October 2025. A by-election, held on 22 January 2026, was won by SNP candidate Zoe Hisbent.

Glenrothes West and Kinglassie by-election (22 January 2026) - 1 seat
Party	Candidate	FPv%	Count				
Party	Candidate	FPv%	1	2	3	4	5
SNP	Zoe Hisbent	43.8	1,167	1,171	1,201	1,225	1,382
Reform	Romano Valente	27.2	725	730	741	787	834
Labour	Jacob Winton	15.5	413	417	452	496	
Conservative	Andrew Butchart	6.8	182	183	202		
Liberal Democrats	Ed Scotcher	4.7	125	129			
Scottish Family	Danny Smith	0.9	25				
Electorate: 12,043 Valid: 2,637 Spoilt: 26 Quota: 1,319 Turnout: 22.1%
