= Julie MacDougall =

Scottish politician

Julie MacDougall MSP
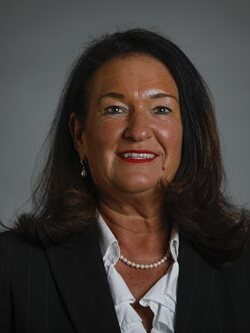
- Official Portrait, 2026

Member of the Scottish Parliament for Mid Scotland and Fife (1 of 7 Regional MSPs)
- Incumbent
- Assumed office 7 May 2026

Personal details
- Party: Reform Party Scotland
- Other political affiliations: Scottish Labour (formerly)

Julie MacDougall is a Scottish politician who has served as a Member of the Scottish Parliament for Mid Scotland and Fife since May 2026. She is a member of Reform Party Scotland.

== Biography ==
Julie MacDougall stood for Labour in Dunfermline in the 2021 Scottish Parliament election. She was elected as a Labour councillor at the 2022 Fife Council election, representing the Burntisland, Kinghorn and Western Kirkcaldy ward, before defecting to Reform UK in 2025.

In the 2026 Scottish Parliament election, she stood as the constituency candidate for Reform in Kirkcaldy, placing third. She was elected MSP in the regional ballot for Mid Scotland and Fife.

Julie MacDougall's father is John MacDougall, who was the Labour Member of Parliament (MP) for Glenrothes from the 2005 general election until his death in 2008.
