= Lochgelly, Cardenden and Benarty (ward) =

Electoral ward of Fife, Scotland

Location of the ward

Lochgelly, Cardenden and Benarty is one of the 22 wards used to elect members of the Fife council in Scotland. It elects four Councillors.

== Councillors ==
Election	Councillors			
2017	Lea McLelland (SNP)	Rosemary Liewald (SNP)	Mary Bain Lockhart (Labour)	Linda Erskine (Labour)
2022	Lea McLelland (SNP)	Rosemary Liewald (SNP)	Mary Bain Lockhart (Labour)	Linda Erskine (Labour)

== Election results ==
=== 2022 Election ===
2022 Fife Council election

Lochgelly, Cardenden and Benarty - 4 seats
Party	Candidate	FPv%	Count		
Party	Candidate	FPv%	1	2	3
Labour	Mary Bain-Lockhart (incumbent)	24.9%	1,230		
SNP	Rosemary Liewald (incumbent)	23.7%	1,173		
SNP	Lea McLelland (incumbent)	19.5%	965	983.3	1,143.4
Labour	Linda Erskine (incumbent)	18.7%	925	1,115.2	
Conservative	Margaret Fairgrieve	7.7%	379	385	385.8
Green	Danny Oswald	2.3%	115	117.1	125.5
Liberal Democrats	Russel McPhate	1.8%	88	94.2	95.3
Scottish Family	Anil Alexander	1.5%	72	74	75.2
Electorate: 14,192 Valid: 4,947 Spoilt: 125 Quota: 990 Turnout: 35.7%

=== 2017 Election ===
2017 Fife Council election

Lochgelly, Cardenden and Benarty - 4 seats
Party	Candidate	FPv%	Count			
Party	Candidate	FPv%	1	2	3	4
Labour	Mary Bain Lockhart (incumbent)	24.6	1,257			
Labour	Linda Erskine (incumbent)	20.2	1,033			
SNP	Lea McLelland	19.5	994	1,018.9	1,019.7	1,034.5
SNP	Rosemary Liewald	19.4	990	1,008.4	1,009.5	1,029.4
Conservative	Scott Campbell	9.7	497	532.3	534.09	538.8
Independent	James Glen	5.2	263	289.5	291.2	312.5
Green	Ronnie Mackie	1.4	70	85.2	85.9	
Electorate: 13,796 Valid: 5,104 Spoilt: 170 Quota: 1,021 Turnout: 5,274 (38.2%)
