= 2007 Fife Council election =

2007 Scottish local government election

← 2003	3 May 2007	2012 →

All 78 seats to Fife Council 40 seats needed for a majority
- Turnout: -->
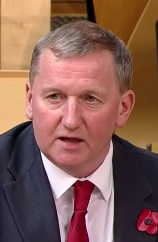
	First party	Second party	Third party
Leader	Alex Rowley	Peter Grant	Elizabeth Riches
Party	Labour	SNP	Liberal Democrats
Leader's seat	The Lochs	Glenrothes West and Kinglassie	East Neuk and Landward
Last election	36	11	23
Seats before	36	11	23
Seats won	24	23	21
Seat change	▼12	▲12	▼2
Popular vote	39,982	38,764	31,176
Percentage	28.7%	27.8%	22.4%
	Fourth party	Fifth party
Leader	Dave Dempsey	Andrew Rodger
Party	Conservative	Independent
Leader's seat	Inverkeithing and Dalgety Bay	Buckhaven, Methil and Wemyss Villages
Last election	2	6
Seats before	2	7
Seats won	5	5
Seat change	▲3	▼2
Popular vote	14,783	10,542
Percentage	10.6%	7.6%
- 2007 Fife Council Election Results Map
Council Leader before election
Anne McGovern
Labour
Council Leader after election
Peter Grant
SNP

Elections to Fife Council were held on 3 May 2007, the same day as the other Scottish local government elections and the Scottish Parliament general election. The election was the first one using 23 new wards created as a result of the Local Governance (Scotland) Act 2004, each ward will elect three or four councillors using the single transferable vote system form of proportional representation. The new wards replace 78 single-member wards which used the plurality (first past the post) system of election.

Scottish National Party and Scottish Liberal Democrats formed a coalition to run the council for the next 5 years.

== Election results ==
Fife local election result 2007
Party	Seats	Gains	Losses	Net gain/loss	Seats %	Votes %	Votes	+/−
Labour	24	N\A	N\A	-11	30.8	28.7	39,982	
SNP	23	N\A	N\A	+11	29.5	27.8	38,764	
Liberal Democrats	21	N\A	N\A	-1	26.9	22.4	31,176	
Conservative	5	N\A	N\A	+3	6.4	10.6	14,783	
Green	0	N\A	N\A	±0	0.0	1.4	1,929	
UKIP	0	N\A	N\A	±0	0.0	0.5	702	
Health Concern	0	N\A	N\A	±0	0.0	0.5	690	New
Solidarity	0	N\A	N\A	±0	0.0	0.3	393	New
Scottish Socialist	0	N\A	N\A	±0	0.0	0.3	365	
Independent	5	N\A	N\A	-2	6.4	7.6	10,542	

== Ward results ==
West Fife and Coastal Villages
Party	Candidate	FPv%	%	Seat	Count
Labour	Bobby Clelland	1,826	23.0	1	1
Liberal Democrats	Gerry McMullan	1,722	21.6	2	1
SNP	Bill Walker	1,663	20.9	3	1
Independent	William Ferguson	1,244	15.6	4	6
Labour	Helen Law	896	11.3		
Conservative	Dennis Halligan	605	7.6		

Dunfermline North
Party	Candidate	FPv%	%	Seat	Count
Liberal Democrats	Jim Burke	1,451	27.5	1	1
Labour	Bill McCulloch	1,254	23.8	2	4
SNP	David Mogg	1,236	23.4	3	6
Health Concern	Gill Cunningham	690	13.0		
Conservative	Paul Callaghan	313	5.9		
Labour	Robert McGregor	272	5.2		
Independent	Jason McGilvray	59	11.2		

Dunfermline Central
Party	Candidate	FPv%	%	Seat	Count
Labour	Willie Sullivan	1,881	23.9	1	1
Liberal Democrats	Jackie McKenna	1,774	22.6	2	1
SNP	Lizz Mogg	1,574	20.0	3	1
Liberal Democrats	Joe Rosiejak	1,488	19.0	4	2
Conservative	Lisa Marie Callaghan	832	10.6		
Green	Graeme Allan	313	4.0		

Dunfermline South
Party	Candidate	FPv%	%	Seat	Count
Liberal Democrats	Tony Martin	1,816	26.1	1	1
SNP	Brian John Goodall	1,583	22.8	2	1
Labour	Mike Rumney	1,446	20.8	3	1
Labour	Bob Young	738	10.6		
Liberal Democrats	Dave Walker	627	9.0	4	6
Conservative	Richard Jules Watt	515	7.4		
Green	Angela Dixon	231	3.3		

Rosyth
Party	Candidate	FPv%	%	Seat	Count
SNP	Douglas Chapman	1,672	32.1	1	1
Labour	Pat Callaghan	1,579	30.3	2	1
Liberal Democrats	Keith Legg	1,081	20.8	3	3
Labour	Malcolm Macaulay	456	8.8		
Conservative	Richard McKell	415	8.0		

Inverkeithing and Dalgety Bay
Party	Candidate	FPv%	%	Seat	Count
SNP	Alice McGarry	2,172	29.5	1	1
Labour	Bob Eadie	1,510	20.5	2	1
Liberal Democrats	Dave Herbert	1,337	18.1	3	2
Conservative	Dave Dempsey	1,291	17.5	4	4
Labour	Jim Philp	512	6.9		
Green	Ian Sinclair	349	4.7		
UKIP	Chris Ashton	137	1.9		
Scottish Socialist	David Noble	60	0.8		

The Lochs
Party	Candidate	FPv%	%	Seat	Count
Independent	Willie Clarke	1,291	28.0	1	1
Labour	Alex Rowley	961	20.9	3	6
SNP	Ann Bain	957	20.8	2	6
Labour	John Devine	818	17.8		
Liberal Democrats	Douglas McLellan	259	5.6		
Conservative	David Hicks	170	3.7		
Solidarity	Kate Stewart	81	1.8		
Independent	James Pate Ireland	72	1.6		

Cowdenbeath
Party	Candidate	FPv%	%	Seat	Count
Labour	John Simpson	1,414	27.5	1	1
Independent	Alex Maxwell	1,350	26.3	2	1
SNP	Alistair John Bain	968	18.9	3	6
Labour	Lesley McEwan	624	12.1		
Independent	Robert Arnott	384	7.5		
Liberal Democrats	Mary Hipwell	246	4.8		
Conservative	Keith Smith	148	2.9		

Lochgelly and Cardenden
Party	Candidate	FPv%	%	Seat	Count
Labour	Mark Hood	1,228	27.8	1	1
Labour	Margot Doig	1,225	27.7	2	1
SNP	Ian Chisholm	1,036	23.4	3	2
Independent	Ernest McPherson	637	14.4		
Conservative	Graeme Whyte	137	3.1		
Liberal Democrats	Lesley Anne Burke	153	3.5		

Burntisland, Kinghorn and Western Kirkcaldy
Party	Candidate	FPv%	%	Seat	Count
SNP	George Kay	2,204	37.8	1	1
Labour	Ron Edwards	1,344	23.0	2	2
Liberal Democrats	Susan Leslie	910	15.6	3	5
Labour	Collett Salvona	649	11.1		
Conservative	Jamie Potton	567	9.7		
UKIP	Peter Adams	164	2.8		

Kirkcaldy North
Party	Candidate	FPv%	%	Seat	Count
SNP	Carol Lindsay	1,632	29.1	1	1
Labour	Neil Crooks	1,617	28.8	2	1
Labour	David Ross	977	17.4	3	5
Liberal Democrats	Les Soper	651	11.6		
Conservative	Peter Finnie	433	7.7		
Independent	Calum Addison Coulter	188	3.4		
Solidarity	Louise McLeary	109	1.9		

Kirkcaldy Central
Party	Candidate	FPv%	%	Seat	Count
SNP	David Torrance	1,795	31.8	1	1
Labour	Judy Hamilton	1,227	21.8	3	4
Liberal Democrats	Alice Soper	1,075	19.1	2	4
Labour	John G Mackenzie	965	17.1		
Conservative	Susan McCulloch	462	8.2		
Solidarity	Steve West	114	2.0		

Kirkcaldy East
Party	Candidate	FPv%	%	Seat	Count
SNP	George Leslie††	1,680	35.4	1	1
Labour	Lawrence Brown	1,221	25.7	2	1
Labour	Kay Carrington	773	16.3	3	5
Liberal Democrats	Bob Forrester	572	12.1		
Conservative	Brian Mills	361	7.6		
Scottish Socialist	Karen McGregor	138	2.9		

Glenrothes West and Kinglassie
Party	Candidate	FPv%	%	Seat	Count
SNP	Peter Grant	1,835	28.4	1	1
Labour	Betty Campbell	1,627	25.2	2	1
SNP	Alf Patey	1,278	19.8	3	2
Labour	Raymond Duguid	585	9.1	4	6
Conservative	David Paterson Croll	384	5.9		
Independent	Bob Taylor	376	5.8		
Liberal Democrats	David Riches	369	5.7		

Glenrothes North, Leslie and Markinch
Party	Candidate	FPv%	%	Seat	Count
SNP	Fiona Grant	1,807	26.8	1	1
SNP	John Beare	1,613	23.9	2	1
Labour	William Kay	1,354	20.0	3	2
Labour	Kay Morrison	787	11.7	4	8
Conservative	David Mole	504	7.5		
Liberal Democrats	Harry Wills	411	6.1		
Independent	Alex Lawson	164	2.4		
Scottish Socialist	Morag Balfour	114	1.7		
UKIP	Paul Smith	90	1.3		

Glenrothes Central and Thornton
Party	Candidate	FPv%	%	Seat	Count
SNP	Dave Cunningham	1,825	34.6	1	1
Labour	Ian Crichton	1,325	25.1	2	1
SNP	Ross Vettraino	707	13.4	3	6
Labour	John Mowbray	564	10.7		
Liberal Democrats	Jane Kerr	301	5.7		
Independent	Vina Bullimore	279	5.3		
Conservative	Jamie Drew	269	5.1		

Howe of Fife and Tay Coast
Party	Candidate	FPv%	%	Seat	Count
Liberal Democrats	Andrew Arbuckle	2,091	31.8	1	1
SNP	David MacDiarmid	1,259	19.2	3	6
Conservative	Andy Heer	1,143	17.4		
Liberal Democrats	Donald Lothian	924	14.1	2	6
Green	Bruce Bennett	511	9.6		
Labour	Iain Miles	477	7.8		
Solidarity	Colin Cameron	89	1.4		
Independent	James Jeffrey Fretwell	75	1.1		

Tay Bridgehead
Party	Candidate	FPv%	%	Seat	Count
Liberal Democrats	Tim Brett	1,489	25.8	1	1
Liberal Democrats	Maggie Taylor	1,243	21.5	2	4
Conservative	Ron Caird	1,191	20.6	3	5
SNP	Alastair Cruickshank	1,173	20.3		
Labour	Nikolai Zhelev	494	8.5		
UKIP	Duncan Pickard	190	3.3		

St Andrews
Party	Candidate	FPv%	%	Seat	Count
Conservative	Dorothea Morrison	1,478	22.1	1	1
Liberal Democrats	Frances Melville	1,454	21.8	2	1
Liberal Democrats	Bill Sangster	809	12.1	3	9
Liberal Democrats	Robin Waterston	788	11.8	4	9
SNP	John Docherty	775	11.6		
Green	Tess Darwin	525	7.9		
Labour	Zoe Smith	411	6.2		
Independent	Joe Peterson	153	2.3		
Independent	Maries Cassells	131	2.0		
Independent	Karen Hutchence	81	1.2		
Independent	Keith Griffiths	77	1.2		

East Neuk and Landward
Party	Candidate	FPv%	%	Seat	Count
Liberal Democrats	Elizabeth Riches	1,696	31.1	1	1
Conservative	Mike Scott-Hayward†	1,515	27.8	2	1
SNP	Margaret Wight	1,041	19.1		
Liberal Democrats	Donald MacGregor	816	15.0	3	4
Labour	Reta Russell	387	7.1		

Cupar
Party	Candidate	FPv%	%	Seat	Count
Liberal Democrats	Margaret Kennedy	1,511	24.8	1	2
Independent	Bryan Poole	1,264	20.8	2	4
Conservative	Roger Guy	1,154	18.9	3	4
SNP	Noel Dolan	887	14.6		
Liberal Democrats	Loretta Mordi	887	14.6		
Labour	Jon Dodds	388	6.4		

Leven, Kennoway and Largo
Party	Candidate	FPv%	%	Seat	Count
SNP	David Alexander	2,164	29.6	1	1
Labour	Charles Haffey	1,676	22.9	2	1
Liberal Democrats	Marilyn Whitehead	1,118	15.3	4	5
SNP	Alistair Hunter	880	12.0	3	5
Conservative	Bill Brooks	799	10.9		
Labour	Vincent Heneghan	578	7.9		
UKIP	Rab Hutchison	89	1.4		

Buckhaven, Methil and Wemyss Villages
Party	Candidate	FPv%	%	Seat	Count
Independent	Andrew Rodger	2,114	33.7	1	1
Labour	Tom Adams	1,456	23.2	2	1
SNP	Arthur Robertson	712	11.3	3	11
SNP	Stuart Macphail	647	10.3		
Labour	Jim Young	460	7.3	4	11
Independent	John O'Brien	225	3.6		
Independent	Anne Marie Flack	195	3.1		
Independent	Ricky Jannetta	164	2.6		
Liberal Democrats	Lois Lothian	107	1.7		
Conservative	David Graham Stacey	97	1.5		
Scottish Socialist	Jim McLean	53	0.8		
UKIP	Kris Seunarine	32	0.5		
Independent	William Wallace	19	0.3		

== Changes Since 2007 Election ==
- †East Neuk and Landward, Cllr Mike Scott-Hayward joined the United Kingdom Independence Party after leaving the Conservative Party
- ††Kirkcaldy East, Cllr George Leslie quit the Scottish National Party and became an Independent
