= 1978 United Kingdom local elections =

- 2 May 1978 (Scotland); 4 May 1978 (England)

All 32 London boroughs, all 36 metropolitan boroughs, 44 out of 296 English districts and all 12 Scottish regions
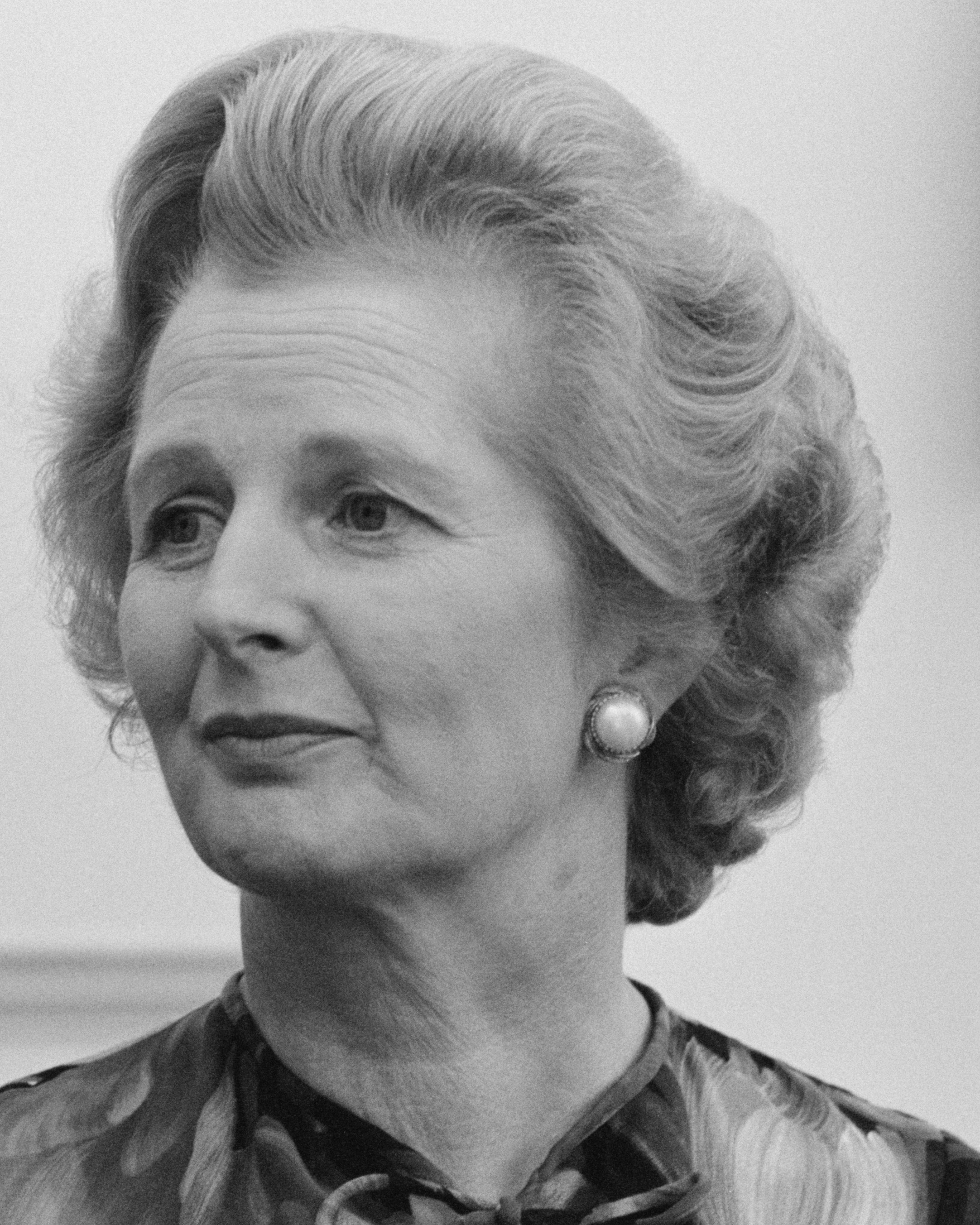

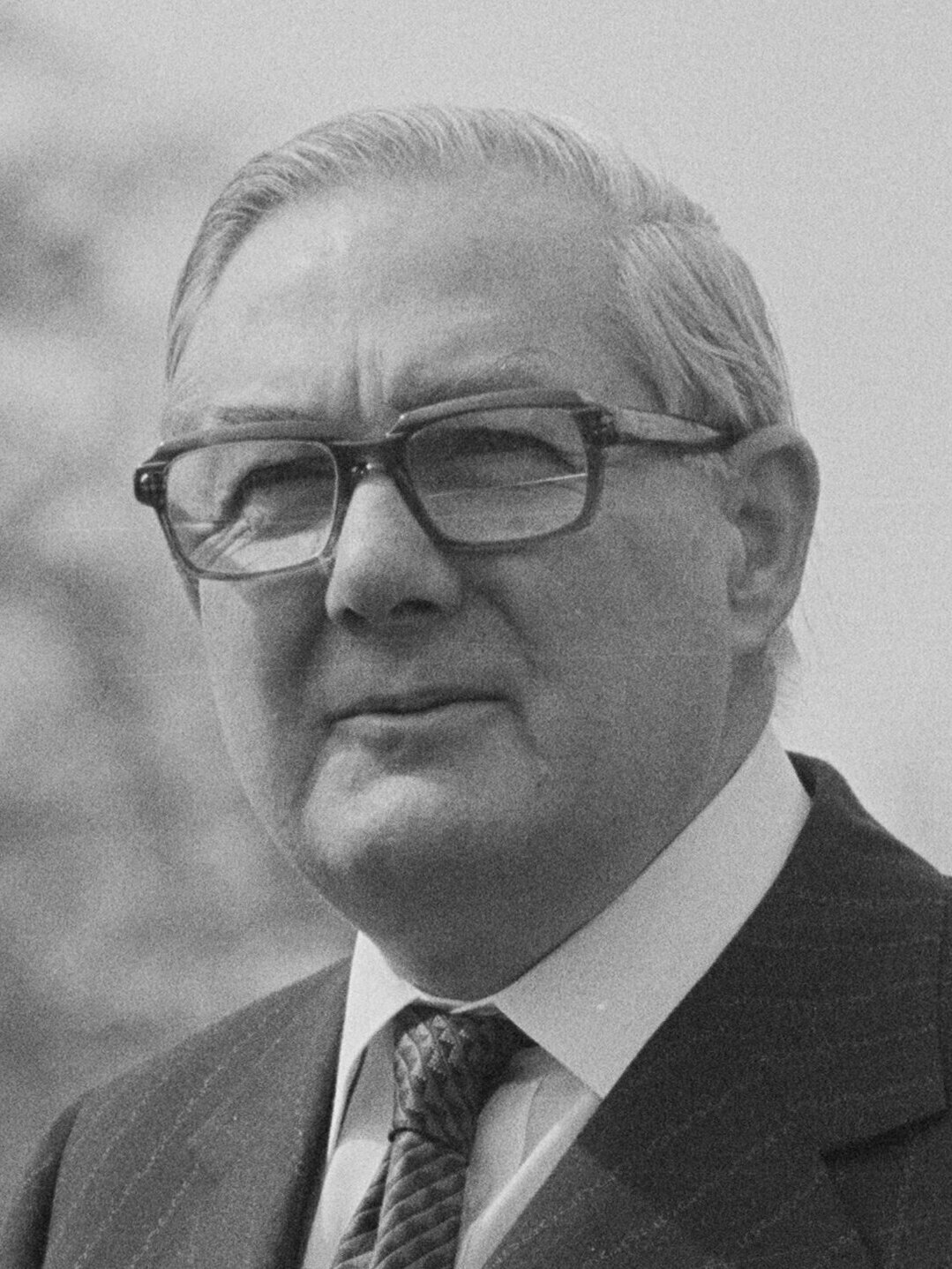

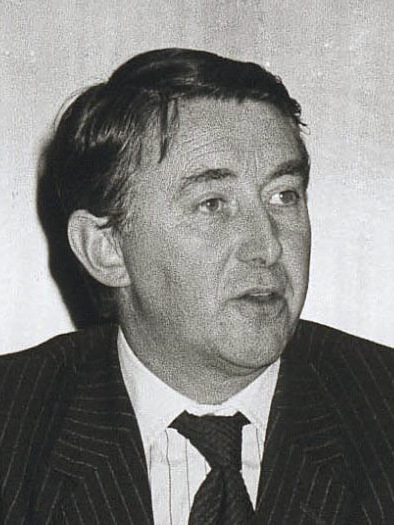
	Majority party	Minority party	Third party
Leader	Margaret Thatcher	James Callaghan	David Steel
Party	Conservative	Labour	Liberal
Leader since	11 February 1975	5 April 1976	7 July 1976
Councillors	12,645	6,644	923
Councillors +/-	▲275	▼461	▼163

Local elections were held in the United Kingdom in May 1978. Elections took place in the London boroughs and metropolitan districts.

The main opposition Conservative Party gained 275 seats, bringing their number of councillors to 12,645. They gained Oldham and Havering from no overall control, and Ealing, Hillingdon, Wandsworth and Sandwell from Labour.

The governing Labour Party lost 461 seats, leaving them with 6,644 councillors. In addition to their losses to the Conservatives they also lost South Tyneside, Hammersmith and Fulham and Wolverhampton to no overall control.

The Liberal Party lost 163 seats in total, leaving them with 923 councillors.

== England ==
=== London boroughs ===
In all 32 London boroughs the whole council was up for election.

Council	Previous control	Result	Details
Barking ‡	Labour	Labour hold	Details
Barnet ‡	Conservative	Conservative hold	Details
Bexley ‡	Conservative	Conservative hold	Details
Brent ‡	Labour	Labour hold	Details
Bromley ‡	Conservative	Conservative hold	Details
Camden ‡	Labour	Labour hold	Details
Croydon ‡	Conservative	Conservative hold	Details
Ealing ‡	Labour	Conservative gain	Details
Enfield	Conservative	Conservative hold	Details
Greenwich ‡	Labour	Labour hold	Details
Hackney ‡	Labour	Labour hold	Details
Hammersmith ‡	Labour	No overall control gain	Details
Haringey ‡	Labour	Labour hold	Details
Harrow ‡	Conservative	Conservative hold	Details
Havering ‡	No overall control	Conservative gain	Details
Hillingdon ‡	Labour	Conservative gain	Details
Hounslow ‡	Labour	Labour hold	Details
Islington ‡	Labour	Labour hold	Details
Kensington and Chelsea ‡	Conservative	Conservative hold	Details
Kingston upon Thames ‡	Conservative	Conservative hold	Details
Lambeth ‡	Labour	Labour hold	Details
Lewisham ‡	Labour	Labour hold	Details
Merton ‡	Conservative	Conservative hold	Details
Newham ‡	Labour	Labour hold	Details
Redbridge ‡	Conservative	Conservative hold	Details
Richmond upon Thames ‡	Conservative	Conservative hold	Details
Southwark ‡	Labour	Labour hold	Details
Sutton ‡	Conservative	Conservative hold	Details
Tower Hamlets ‡	Labour	Labour hold	Details
Waltham Forest ‡	Labour	Labour hold	Details
Wandsworth ‡	Labour	Conservative gain	Details
Westminster ‡	Conservative	Conservative hold	Details

‡ New ward boundaries

=== Metropolitan boroughs ===
All 36 metropolitan borough councils had one third of their seats up for election.

Council	Previous control	Result	Details
Barnsley	Labour	Labour hold	Details
Birmingham	Conservative	Conservative hold	Details
Bolton	Conservative	Conservative hold	Details
Bradford	Conservative	Conservative hold	Details
Bury	Conservative	Conservative hold	Details
Calderdale	Conservative	Conservative hold	Details
Coventry	Labour	Conservative gain	Details
Doncaster	Labour	Labour hold	Details
Dudley	Conservative	Conservative hold	Details
Gateshead	Labour	Labour hold	Details
Kirklees	Conservative	Conservative hold	Details
Knowsley	Labour	Labour hold	Details
Leeds	Conservative	Conservative hold	Details
Liverpool	No overall control	No overall control hold	Details
Manchester	Labour	Labour hold	Details
Newcastle upon Tyne	Labour	Labour hold	Details
North Tyneside	Labour	Labour hold	Details
Oldham	No overall control	Conservative gain	Details
Rochdale	Conservative	Conservative hold	Details
Rotherham	Labour	Labour hold	Details
Salford	Labour	Labour hold	Details
Sandwell	Labour	Conservative gain	Details
Sefton	Conservative	Conservative hold	Details
Sheffield	Labour	Labour hold	Details
Solihull	Conservative	Conservative hold	Details
South Tyneside	Labour	No overall control gain	Details
St Helens	Labour	Labour hold	Details
Stockport	Conservative	Conservative hold	Details
Sunderland	Labour	Labour hold	Details
Tameside	Conservative	Conservative hold	Details
Trafford	Conservative	Conservative hold	Details
Wakefield	Labour	Labour hold	Details
Walsall	No overall control	No overall control hold	Details
Wigan	Labour	Labour hold	Details
Wirral	Conservative	Conservative hold	Details
Wolverhampton	Labour	No overall control gain	Details

=== District councils ===
In 44 districts one third of the council was up for election.

These were the first councils which had passed a resolution under section 7 (4) (b) of the Local Government Act 1972, requesting a system of elections by thirds. They could do so because they had had their new ward boundaries introduced at the 1976 elections.

Council	Previous control	Result	Details
Basingstoke and Deane	Conservative	Conservative hold	Details
Bath	Conservative	Conservative hold	Details
Brentwood	Conservative	Conservative hold	Details
Broxbourne	Conservative	Conservative hold	Details
Burnley	Labour	Labour hold	Details
Cambridge	Conservative	Conservative hold	Details
Cannock Chase	Labour	Labour hold	Details
Chorley	Conservative	Conservative hold	Details
Colchester	Conservative	Conservative hold	Details
Congleton	Conservative	Conservative hold	Details
Eastbourne	Conservative	Conservative hold	Details
Eastleigh	Conservative	Conservative hold	Details
Ellesmere Port and Neston	Labour	Labour hold	Details
Elmbridge	Conservative	Conservative hold	Details
Fareham	Conservative	Conservative hold	Details
Halton	Labour	Labour hold	Details
Harlow	Labour	Labour hold	Details
Hart	Independent	Independent hold	Details
Hartlepool	No overall control	No overall control hold	Details
Havant	No overall control	Conservative gain	Details
Hertsmere	Conservative	Conservative hold	Details
Huntingdon	Conservative	Conservative hold	Details
Milton Keynes	Conservative	Conservative hold	Details
Mole Valley	No overall control	No overall control hold	Details
Pendle	Conservative	Conservative hold	Details
Peterborough	Conservative	No overall control gain	Details
Preston	Conservative	Conservative hold	Details
Rochford	Conservative	Conservative hold	Details
Rossendale	Conservative	Conservative hold	Details
Runnymede	Conservative	Conservative hold	Details
Shrewsbury and Atcham	Conservative	Conservative hold	Details
South Bedfordshire	Conservative	Conservative hold	Details
South Cambridgeshire	Independent	Independent hold	Details
Southend-on-Sea	Conservative	Conservative hold	Details
Tamworth	No overall control	Conservative gain	Details
Tandridge	Conservative	Conservative hold	Details
Thamesdown	No overall control	Labour gain	Details
Three Rivers	Conservative	Conservative hold	Details
Tunbridge Wells	Conservative	Conservative hold	Details
Watford	Labour	Labour hold	Details
Welwyn Hatfield	Conservative	Conservative hold	Details
West Lancashire	Conservative	Conservative hold	Details
Winchester	No overall control	No overall control hold	Details
Woking	Conservative	Conservative hold	Details

== Scotland ==
=== Regional councils ===
Council	Previous control	Result	Details
Borders	Independent	Independent hold	Details
Central	Labour	Labour hold	Details
Dumfries and Galloway	Independent	Independent hold	Details
Fife	Labour	Labour hold	Details
Grampian	Conservative	Conservative hold	Details
Highland	Independent	Independent hold	Details
Lothian	No overall control	Labour gain	Details
Orkney	Independent	Independent hold	Details
Shetland	Independent	Independent hold	Details
Strathclyde	Labour	Labour hold	Details
Tayside	No overall control	Conservative gain	Details
Western Isles	Independent	Independent hold	Details
