= Fife Council elections =

Local government elections in Fife, Scotland

Fife Council in Scotland holds elections every five years, previously holding them every four years from its creation as a single-tier authority in 1995 to 2007.

== Council elections ==
=== As a regional council ===
Year	SNP	Labour	Liberal (Note: Alliance from 1981 to 1988, Liberal Democrats from 1988 to 1995.)	Conservative	Communist	Independent
1974	0	26	0	10	1	5 (Note: Includes 2 Ratepayers.)
1978	1	24	0	14	1	2
1982 (Note: New ward boundaries.)	1	27	4	10	1	2
1986	2	30	8	4	1	1
1990	2	30	10	2	1	1
1994 (Note: New ward boundaries.)	4	28	12	0	1	1

=== As a unitary authority ===
Year	SNP	Labour	Liberal Democrats	Conservative	Communist	Independent
1995	9	52	24	0	1	2
1999 (Note: New ward boundaries.)	9	43	21	1	1	4 (Note: Includes 1 Independent Labour.)
2003	11	36	23	2	0	6
2007 (Note: Change to single transferable vote system and new ward boundaries.)	23	24	21	5	0	5
2012	26	35	10	3	0	4
2017 (Note: New ward boundaries.)	29	24	7	15	0	0
2022	34	20	13	8	0	0

== Results maps ==
1982 results map

1986 results map

1990 results map

1994 results map

1995 results map

1999 results map

2003 results map

2007 results map

2012 results map

2017 results map

2022 results map

== By-elections ==
=== 2003–2007 ===
Lumphinnans and Lochgelly South By-Election 10 June 2004
Party	Candidate	Votes	%	±%
Labour		462	38.2	−8.0
SNP		319	26.3	+26.3
Independent		297	24.5	+24.5
Scottish Socialist		72	5.9	−1.7
Liberal Democrats		24	2.0	−0.5
Conservative		19	1.6	−1.2
Scottish Senior Citizens		18	1.5	+1.5
Majority		143	11.8	
Turnout		1,211		
Labour hold		Swing		

Cupar North By-Election 11 November 2004
Party	Candidate	Votes	%	±%
Liberal Democrats		443	34.4	−20.7
Independent		379	29.4	+29.4
Conservative		342	26.5	+1.2
SNP		54	4.2	+4.2
Scottish Socialist		40	3.1	−5.2
Labour		31	2.4	−8.9
Majority		64	5.0	
Turnout		1,289		
Liberal Democrats hold		Swing		

Auchtertool and Burntisland East By-Election 29 September 2005
Party	Candidate	Votes	%	±%
SNP		609	46.7	+21.9
Labour		321	24.6	−4.1
Independent		249	19.1	+19.1
Liberal Democrats		71	5.4	−11.3
Conservative		54	4.1	+4.1
Majority		288	22.1	
Turnout		1,304		
SNP gain from Independent		Swing		

Markinch and Woodside East By-Election 28 September 2006
Party	Candidate	Votes	%	±%
SNP	John Beare	892	55.7	+26.1
Labour		388	24.2	−34.0
Liberal Democrats		257	16.1	+10.5
Conservative		39	2.4	−4.2
Independent		25	1.6	+1.6
Majority		504	31.5	
Turnout		1,601		
SNP gain from Labour		Swing		

=== 2012–2017 ===
Glenrothes North, Leslie and Markinch By-Election 20 June 2013
Party	Candidate	FPv%	Count			
Party	Candidate	FPv%	1	2	3	4
Labour	John Wincott	45.8	1,896	1,927	1,966	2,095
SNP	Keith Grieve	41.3	1,711	1,724	1,761	1,814
Conservative	Allan Smith	6.6	272	287	335	
UKIP	Peter Taggerty	4.3	176	184		
Liberal Democrats	Harry Wills	2.0	83			
Labour hold						
Valid: 4,138 Spoilt: 25 Quota: 2,070 Turnout: 4,163

Dunfermline South By-Election 24 October 2013
Party	Candidate	FPv%	Count					
Party	Candidate	FPv%	1	2	3	4	5	6
Labour	Billy Pollock	39.7	2,552	2,568	2,618	2,697	3,170	4,086
SNP	Helen Cannon-Todd	32.0	2,057	2,075	2,112	2,142	2,358	
Liberal Democrats	Robin Munro	15.7	1,009	1,029	1,073	1,257		
Conservative	David Ross	7.0	450	497	504			
Green	Angela Dixon	2.8	183	201				
UKIP	Judith Rideout	2.8	183					
Labour hold								
Valid: 6,434 Quota: 3,217

Cowdenbeath By-Election 22 May 2014
Party	Candidate	FPv%	Count
Party	Candidate	FPv%	1
Labour	Gary Guichan	61.5	2,039
SNP	Connor Watt	25.2	834
UKIP	Judith Rideout	8.4	277
Conservative	John Wheatley	4.9	164
Labour hold			
Valid: 3,314

The Lochs By-Election 22 May 2014
Party	Candidate	FPv%	Count
Party	Candidate	FPv%	1
Labour	Alex Campbell	65.9	2,042
SNP	Lesley Backhouse	24.3	753
UKIP	Martin Green	5.2	162
Conservative	Jonathan Gray	4.6	141
Labour hold			
Valid: 3,098 Spoilt: 52 Quota: 1,550 Turnout: 3,150

Kirkcaldy East By-Election 22 January 2015
Party	Candidate	FPv%	Count					
Party	Candidate	FPv%	1	2	3	4	5	6
SNP	Marie Penman	47.3	1,460	1,464	1,466	1,472	1,484	1,553
Labour	Liz Easton	35.3	1,088	1,088	1,091	1,097	1,120	1,148
Conservative	Edgar Cook	7.2	223	224	225	231	266	274
Green	Claire Reid	4.1	126	129	132	138	150	
UKIP	Peter Adams	3.8	117	117	120	123		
Liberal Democrats	Callum Leslie	1.3	40	40	41			
Independent	Ronald Hunter	0.6	19	21				
Independent	Alastair MacIntyre	0.4	12					
SNP hold								
Valid: 3,085 Spoilt: 41 Quota: 1,543 Turnout: 3,126

Glenrothes West and Kinglassie By-Election 26 March 2015
Party	Candidate	FPv%	Count
Party	Candidate	FPv%	1
SNP	Craig Walker	55.3	2,539
Labour	Alan Seath	35.8	1,643
Conservative	John Wheatley	4.4	202
UKIP	Martin Green	3.2	146
Liberal Democrats	Jane Ann Liston	1.3	61
SNP gain from Labour			
Valid: 4,591

Dunfermline South By-Election 7 May 2015
Party	Candidate	FPv%	Count
Party	Candidate	FPv%	1
SNP	Fay Sinclair	51.5	5,899
Labour	Andrew Verrecchia	27.8	3,185
Conservative	David Ross	11.6	1,324
Liberal Democrats	James Calder	9.1	1,041
SNP gain from Labour			
Valid: 11,449 Spoilt: 132 Quota: 5,725 Turnout: 11,581

Glenrothes West and Kinglassie By-Election 1 October 2015
Party	Candidate	FPv%	Count
Party	Candidate	FPv%	1
SNP	Julie Ford	59.0	2,235
Labour	Alan Seath	31.9	1,207
Conservative	Jonathan Gray	6.2	234
Green	Lorna Ross	3.0	113
SNP hold			
Valid: 3,789 Quota: 1,895

Dunfermline North By-Election 26 November 2015
Party	Candidate	FPv%	Count					
Party	Candidate	FPv%	1	2	3	4	5	6
SNP	Ian Ferguson	43.5	1,056	1,062	1,083	1,122	1,144	1,337
Labour	Joe Long	29.6	719	722	733	805	912	
Conservative	James Reekie	12.5	304	319	321	389		
Liberal Democrats	James Calder	9.5	230	235	253			
Green	Lewis Campbell	2.6	63	72				
UKIP	Chloanne Dodds	2.4	58					
SNP hold								
Valid: 2,430 Spoilt: 20 Quota: 1,216 Turnout: 2,450

Rosyth By-Election 26 November 2015
Party	Candidate	FPv%	Count						
Party	Candidate	FPv%	1	2	3	4	5	6	7
SNP	Sharon Wilson	45.2	1,214	1,235	1,241	1,249	1,263	1,286	1,623
Labour	Vikki Fairweather	34.5	926	939	950	966	1,012	1,117	
Conservative	David Ross	9.1	245	246	256	281	309		
Liberal Democrats	Matthew Hall	3.6	97	102	112	122			
UKIP	Colin Mitchelson	3.3	88	90	97				
Independent	Alastair MacIntyre	2.5	66	68					
Green	Cairinne MacDonald	1.9	51						
SNP hold									
Valid: 2,687 Spoilt: 22 Quota: 1,344 Turnout: 2,709

The Lochs By-Election 25 August 2016
Party	Candidate	FPv%	Count			
Party	Candidate	FPv%	1	2	3	4
Labour	Mary Bain Lockhart	47.1	1,318	1,329	1,365	1,459
SNP	Lea McLelland	38.6	1,079	1,091	1,106	1,124
Conservative	Malcolm McDonald	9.6	270	275	280	
Communist	Thomas Kirby	3.1	86	89		
Green	Bradford Oliver	1.6	45			
Labour gain from Independent						
Valid: 2,798 Quota: 1,400

Leven, Kennoway and Largo By-Election 15 December 2016
Party	Candidate	FPv%	Count				
Party	Candidate	FPv%	1	2	3	4	5
SNP	Alistair Suttie	37.0	1,501	1,532	1,615	1,668	2,214
Labour	Colin Davidson	28.4	1,155	1,169	1,302	1,620	
Conservative	Graham Ritchie	18.5	752	754	954		
Liberal Democrats	Steve Wood	14.3	580	590			
Green	Iain Morrice	1.8	74				
SNP hold							
Valid: 4,062 Spoilt: 28 Quota: 2,032 Turnout: 4,090

=== 2017–2022 ===
Inverkeithing and Dalgety Bay By-Election 6 September 2018
Party	Candidate	FPv%	Count							
Party	Candidate	FPv%	1	2	3	4	5	6	7	8
Conservative	Dave Coleman	37.3	2,309	2,312	2,316	2,330	2,455	2,615	2,839	3,244
SNP	Neale Hanvey	28.1	1,741	1,741	1,744	1,840	1,950	2,076	2,327	
Labour	Billy Pollock	12.0	744	746	747	794	867	1,058		
Liberal Democrats	Callum Hawthorne	9.1	566	568	573	631	738			
Independent	Peter Collins	8.4	521	524	545	565				
Green	Mags Hall	4.2	257	257	258					
Independent	Alastair MacIntyre	0.6	40	41						
Scottish Libertarian	Calum Paul	0.2	13							
Conservative gain from Labour										
Valid: 6,191 Spoilt: 48 Quota: 3,096 Turnout: 6,239

Dunfermline Central By-Election 14 November 2019
Party	Candidate	FPv%	Count					
Party	Candidate	FPv%	1	2	3	4	5	6
SNP	Derek Glen	33.2	1,526	1,528	1,628	1,761	1,798	2,297
Liberal Democrats	Aude Boubaker-Calder	22.8	1,050	1,053	1,117	1,343	1,796	
Conservative	Chloe Dodds	24.8	1,142	1,150	1,150	1,202		
Labour	Michael Boyd	13.5	621	624	656			
Green	Fiona McOwan	5.1	235	237				
Scottish Libertarian	Keith Chamberlain	0.6	28					
SNP gain from Conservative								
Valid: 4,602 Quota: 2,302

Rosyth By-election 14 November 2019
Party	Candidate	FPv%	Count					
Party	Candidate	FPv%	1	2	3	4	5	6
SNP	Sharon Green-Wilson	42.8	1,347	1,347	1,406	1,429	1,486	1,639
Conservative	Margaret Fairgrieve	24.4	768	771	774	822	885	976
Labour	Billy Pollock	15.2	480	480	498	526	591	
Liberal Democrats	Jill Blair	7.9	249	250	275	291		
Independent	Alastair MacIntyre	5.0	157	162	168			
Green	Craig McCutcheon	4.2	132	133				
Scottish Libertarian	Calum Paul	0.5	16					
SNP hold								
Valid: 3,149 Quota: 1,575

=== 2022–2027 ===
West Fife and Coastal Villages By-Election 28 November 2024
Party	Candidate	FPv%	Count						
Party	Candidate	FPv%	1	2	3	4	5	6	7
Labour	Karen Beaton	33.1	881	882	890	921	1,010	1,147	1,474
SNP	Paul Steele	33.1	879	887	896	944	985	1,015	
Conservative	David Ross	16.0	426	434	444	449	516		
Liberal Democrats	Paul Buchanan-Quigley	8.5	227	232	246	279			
Green	Fiona McOwan	4.8	128	130	141				
Independent	George Morton	2.4	64	77					
Scottish Family	Danny Smith	1.9	53						
Labour hold									
Valid: 2,658 Spoilt: 26 Quota: 1,330 Turnout: 2,684

Glenrothes Central and Thornton By-Election 24 April 2025
Party	Candidate	FPv%	Count			
Party	Candidate	FPv%	1	2	3	4
SNP	Lynda Holton	47.6	1,439	1,451	1,489	1,623
Labour	Maciej Dokurno	21.5	649	674	753	878
Reform	Ian Smith	17.9	541	591	652	
Liberal Democrats	Ed Scotcher	6.9	207	257		
Conservative	Fiona Leslie	6.1	185			
SNP hold						
Valid: 3,021 Spoilt: 63 Quota: 1,511 Turnout: 3,084

Buckhaven, Methil and Wemyss Villages By-Election 6 November 2025
Party	Candidate	FPv%	Count					
Party	Candidate	FPv%	1	2	3	4	5	6
SNP	Anne Marie Caldwell	42.6	1,594	1,604	1,608	1,646	1,674	1,900
Reform	Mark Davies	28.9	1,080	1,088	1,102	1,113	1,126	1,220
Labour	Donna Donnelly	20.8	778	779	783	793	826	
Liberal Democrats	Jill Reilly	2.6	99	103	112	119		
Alba	Christine Watson	2.2	83	90	92			
Conservative	Brian Mills	1.7	64	64				
Sovereignty	Kieran Anderson	1.2	45					
SNP gain from Labour								
Valid: 3,743 Spoilt: 31 Quota: 1,872 Turnout: 3,774

Glenrothes West and Kinglassie By-Election 22 January 2026
Party	Candidate	FPv%	Count				
Party	Candidate	FPv%	1	2	3	4	5
SNP	Zoe Hisbent	44.3	1,167	1,171	1,201	1,225	1,382
Reform	Romeo Valente	27.5	725	730	741	787	834
Labour	Jacob Winton	15.7	413	417	452	496	
Conservative	Andrew Butchart	6.9	182	183	202		
Liberal Democrats	Ed Scotcher	4.7	125	129			
Scottish Family	Danny Smith	0.9	25				
SNP hold							
Valid: 2,637 Spoilt: 26 Quota: 1,319 Turnout: 2,663
