= 1978 Brentwood District Council election =

1978 English local government election

- 4 May 1976

13 out of 39 seats to Brentwood District Council 20 seats needed for a majority

	First party	Second party	Third party
Party	Conservative	Labour	Liberal
Seats won	11	1	1
Seats after	35	3	1
Seat change	▲1	▼1	Steady
Popular vote	13,122	6,416	2,175
Percentage	60.3%	29.5%	10.0%
Swing	▼0.5%	▼1.8%	▲2.4%
Council control before election
Conservative
Council control after election
Conservative

The 1978 Brentwood District Council election took place on 4 May 1978 to elect members of Brentwood District Council in Essex, England. This was on the same day as other local elections.

== Summary ==
=== Election result ===
1978 Brentwood District Council election
Party	This election			Full council			This election		
Party	Seats	Net	Seats %	Other	Total	Total %	Votes	Votes %	+/−
Conservative	11	▲1	84.6	24	35	89.7	13,122	60.3	–0.5
Labour	1	▼1	7.7	2	3	7.7	6,416	29.5	–1.8
Liberal	1	Steady	7.7	0	1	2.6	2,175	10.0	+2.4
Communist	0	Steady	0.0	0	0	0.0	44	0.2	±0.0
