= 1978 Southend-on-Sea Borough Council election =

1978 English local election

← 1976	4 May 1978	1979 →

14 out of 39 seasts to Southend-on-Sea Borough Council 20 seats needed for a majority

	First party	Second party	Third party
Party	Conservative	Liberal	Labour
Seats won	12	1	1
Seats after	29	5	5
Seat change	Steady	▼1	▲1
Popular vote	28,568	10,624	9,629
Percentage	58.2%	21.6%	19.6%
Swing	▲2.9%	▼5.4%	▲2.8%
- Winner of each seat at the 1978 Southend-on-Sea Borough Council election.
Council control before election
Conservative
Council control after election
Conservative

The 1978 Southend-on-Sea Borough Council election took place on 4 May 1978 to elect members of Southend-on-Sea Borough Council in Essex, England. This was on the same day as other local elections.

== Summary ==
=== Election result ===
1978 Southend-on-Sea Borough Council election
Party	This election			Full council			This election		
Party	Seats	Net	Seats %	Other	Total	Total %	Votes	Votes %	+/−
Conservative	12	Steady	85.7	17	29	74.4	28,568	58.2	+2.9
Liberal	1	▼1	7.1	4	5	12.8	10,624	21.6	–5.4
Labour	1	▲1	7.1	4	5	12.8	9,629	19.6	+2.8
National Front	0	Steady	0.0	0	0	0.0	277	0.6	N/A

== Ward results ==
Incumbent councillors standing for re-election are marked with an asterisk (*). Changes in seats do not take into account by-elections or defections.

=== Belfairs ===
Belfairs
Party	Candidate	Votes	%	±%
Conservative	G. Heath	2,472	69.3	+9.8
Liberal	E. Griggs	671	18.8	–10.2
Labour	A. Francis	422	11.8	+0.4
Majority		1,801	50.5	N/A
Turnout		3,565	36.5	–7.5
Registered electors		9,756		
Conservative hold		Swing	▲10.0	

=== Blenheim ===
Blenheim
Party	Candidate	Votes	%	±%
Conservative	P. Bone	2,133	62.4	+1.7
Liberal	T. Ray	658	19.2	–20.1
Labour	C. Newman	505	14.8	N/A
National Front	P. Twomey	125	3.7	N/A
Majority		1,475	43.1	N/A
Turnout		3,421	34.5	–3.8
Registered electors		9,917		
Conservative hold		Swing	▲10.9	

=== Chalkwell ===
Chalkwell
Party	Candidate	Votes	%	±%
Conservative	T. Murphy	2,581	67.9	+8.4
Liberal	J. Keith	947	24.9	–6.5
Labour	K. Leaman	275	7.2	–2.0
Majority		1,634	43.0	N/A
Turnout		3,803	40.1	–2.6
Registered electors		9,485		
Conservative hold		Swing	▲7.5	

=== Eastwood ===
Eastwood (2 seats due to by-election)
Party	Candidate	Votes	%	±%
Conservative	I. Downie	2,295	56.8	
Conservative	V. Kaye	2,222	55.0	
Liberal	F. Heaffey	1,383	34.2	
Liberal	N. Goodman	1,362	33.7	
Labour	P. Griffiths	363	9.0	
Labour	B. Buitekant	254	6.3	
Turnout		~4,039	44.1	
Registered electors		9,159		
Conservative hold				
Conservative hold				

=== Leigh ===
Leigh
Party	Candidate	Votes	%	±%
Liberal	C. Titman*	2,519	49.2	–2.2
Conservative	P. Bohling	2,391	46.7	+2.8
Labour	P. Harrison	208	4.1	–0.6
Majority		128	2.5	N/A
Turnout		5,118	53.1	+2.4
Registered electors		9,635		
Liberal hold		Swing	▼2.5	

=== Milton ===
Milton
Party	Candidate	Votes	%	±%
Conservative	K. Cater	1,580	65.9	+7.9
Labour	D. Waring	819	34.1	+7.8
Majority		761	31.8	N/A
Turnout		2,399	31.7	+3.0
Registered electors		8,973		
Conservative hold		Swing	▲0.1	

=== Prittlewell ===
Prittlewell
Party	Candidate	Votes	%	±%
Conservative	L. Myers	1,845	43.5	–3.0
Liberal	J. Hugill*	1,836	43.3	–10.2
Labour	E. Wilson	557	13.1	N/A
Majority		9	0.2	N/A
Turnout		4,238	42.0	+0.5
Registered electors		10,083		
Conservative gain from Liberal		Swing	▲3.6	

=== Shoebury ===
Shoebury
Party	Candidate	Votes	%	±%
Conservative	R. Levy	1,868	55.5	–4.8
Labour	D. Jeffrey	1,138	33.8	–5.9
Liberal	J. O'Neill	362	10.7	N/A
Majority		730	21.7	N/A
Turnout		3,368	32.4	–4.0
Registered electors		10,400		
Conservative hold		Swing	▲0.6	

=== Southchurch ===
Southchurch
Party	Candidate	Votes	%	±%
Conservative	S. Bull*	2,096	74.0	–3.8
Labour	H. Mapp	735	26.0	+3.8
Majority		1,361	48.1	N/A
Turnout		2,831	29.2	–9.1
Registered electors		9,698		
Conservative hold		Swing	▼3.8	

=== St Lukes ===
St Lukes
Party	Candidate	Votes	%	±%
Conservative	R. Richmond*	1,234	48.0	+14.9
Labour	N. Boorman	1,186	46.1	+10.8
National Front	E. Jones	152	5.9	N/A
Majority		48	1.9	N/A
Turnout		2,572	29.2	–3.1
Registered electors		8,803		
Conservative hold		Swing	▲2.1	

=== Thorpe ===
Thorpe
Party	Candidate	Votes	%	±%
Conservative	N. Moss*	2,741	84.7	+16.8
Labour	K. Redmond	495	15.3	+3.7
Majority		2,246	69.4	N/A
Turnout		3,236	34.4	–3.9
Registered electors		9,409		
Conservative hold		Swing	▲6.6	

=== Victoria ===
Victoria
Party	Candidate	Votes	%	±%
Labour	R. Kennedy	1,298	50.6	+8.2
Conservative	A. Fuller	1,265	49.4	+10.4
Majority		33	1.3	N/A
Turnout		2,563	26.3	–3.4
Registered electors		9,754		
Labour gain from Conservative		Swing	▼1.1	

=== Westborough ===
Westborough
Party	Candidate	Votes	%	±%
Conservative	P. Winkley*	1,845	44.9	–2.0
Labour	A. Hurst	1,374	33.5	+9.9
Liberal	M. Lubel	886	21.6	–8.0
Majority		471	11.5	N/A
Turnout		4,105	44.7	+1.9
Registered electors		9,190		
Conservative hold		Swing	▼6.0	
