= 1990 Fife Regional Council election =

Fifth election to Fife Regional Council

← 1986	3 May 1990	1994 →

All 46 seats to Fife Regional Council 24 seats needed for a majority
- Turnout: 46.5%
	First party	Second party	Third party
Party	Labour	Liberal Democrats	SNP
Last election	30	8	2
Seats won	30	10	2
Seat change	0	▲2	0
Popular vote	54,702	21,259	18,403
Percentage	45.6%	17.8%	15.4%
	Fourth party	Fifth party	Sixth party
Party	Conservative	Independent	Communist
Last election	4	2	1
Seats won	2	1	1
Seat change	▼2	▼1	0
Popular vote	17,570	2,705	1,907
Percentage	14.7%	2.3%	1.6%
- Results by electoral division.
Council control before election
Labour
Council control after election
Labour

The 1990 Fife Regional Council election, the fifth election to the Fife Regional Council, was held on 3 May 1990 as part of the wider 1990 Scottish regional elections. The election saw Labour maintaining their control of the region's 46 seat council.

== Aggregate results ==
The result of the election

Fife Regional election, 1990 Turnout: 46.5%
Party	Seats	Gains	Losses	Net gain/loss	Seats %	Votes %	Votes	+/−
Labour	30			0	65.2	45.6	54,702	
Liberal Democrats	10			▲2	21.7	17.8	21,259	
SNP	2			0	4.3	15.4	18,403	
Conservative	2			▼2	4.3	14.7	17,570	
Independent	1			▼1	2.2	2.3	2,705	
Communist	1			0	2.2	1.6	1,907	
Scottish Green	0			0	0.0	1.6	1,846	
Independent Labour	0			0	0.0	0.9	1,036	
Anti poll tax	0			0	0.0	0.5	601	New

== Ward results ==
1990 Fife Regional Council election
Ward		Councillor	Result
1	Burntisland/Kinghorn	J. W. MacDougall	Labour hold
2	Raith/Auchtertool	A. Smith	Labour hold
3	Dunearn/Torbain	W. Brand	Labour hold
4	Dunnikier/Fair Isle	J. B. Farmer	Labour hold
5	Valley/Bennochy	W. T. Barclay	Labour hold
6	Hayfield/Pathhead	D. Cepok	Labour hold
7	Smeaton/Sinclairtown	A. Cameron	Labour hold
8	Dysart/Thornton	E. H. Tottenham	Labour hold
9	Buckhaven/East Weymess	A. K. Walker	Labour hold
10	Denbeath/Methil	R. Gough	Labour hold
11	Methilhill/Mountfleurie	A. J. Smith	Labour hold
12	Leven	R. W. Turpie	Labour hold
13	Kennoway/Windygates	P. A. Gillon	SNP gain from Labour
14	Markinch/Pitcoudie etc.	V. Gemmell	Labour hold
15	Auchmuty/Woodside	E. B. Henderson	Labour hold
16	Stenton/Pitteuchar	C. Laing	Labour hold
17	South Parks/Rimbleton	C. J. Groom	Labour hold
18	Glenwood	A. K. Latto	Labour gain from SNP
19	Kinglassie/Cardenden	E. A. Reid	Labour hold
20	St Andrews West & South	F. Melville	Liberal Democrats gain from SDP
21	St Andrews Central SE	K. R. Neilson	Conservative hold
22	Auchtermuchty/Newburgh	A. D. Arbuckie	Liberal Democrats hold
23	Howe of Fife/Freuchie	I. W. Smith	Liberal Democrats hold
24	Cupar	R. B. Forrest	Liberal Democrats gain from Conservative
25	Crail/Anstruther	J. E. Riches	Liberal Democrats gain from Conservative
26	St Monans/Pittenweem etc.	J. Braid	Independent hold
27	Motray/Central	E. E. Gunstone	Liberal Democrats hold
29	Newport/Tayport	E. J. McFee	Liberal Democrats hold
29	Kincardine/Valleyfield	I. M. McGeachie	Labour hold
30	Saline/Oakley	J. McMurdo	Labour hold
31	Kelty	W. Rowley	Labour hold
32	Ballingray/Lochore	W. L. Clarke	Communist hold
33	Lochgelly	A. Sharp	Labour hold
34	Aberdour/Dalgety Bay	E. Collins	Conservative hold
35	Inverkeithing/Rosyth	A. McGarry	SNP hold
36	Cowdenbeath/Fulford SE	T. Dair	Labour hold
37	Cowdenbeath Moss-Side etc.	G. Bird	Labour hold
38	Townhill/Halbeath	A. Rowley	Labour hold
39	Dunfermline North	G. Stanfield	Labour hold
40	Dunfermline Central etc.	E. Grant	Liberal Democrats gain from SDP
41	Limekilns/Rosyth West	H. S. Eadie	Labour hold
42	Garvock/Blacklaw	W. J. Rosiejak	Liberal Democrats hold
43	Dunfermline Woodmill etc.	R. Young	Labour hold
44	Dunfermline Aberdour etc.	G. K. Aitken	Liberal Democrats gain from SDP
45	Rosyth East and South	C. Logan	Labour hold
46	Leslie/Collydean	I. Morris	Labour hold
