= 1978 Scottish regional elections =

- 2 May 1978
- Registered: 3,737,145
- Turnout: 44.7%
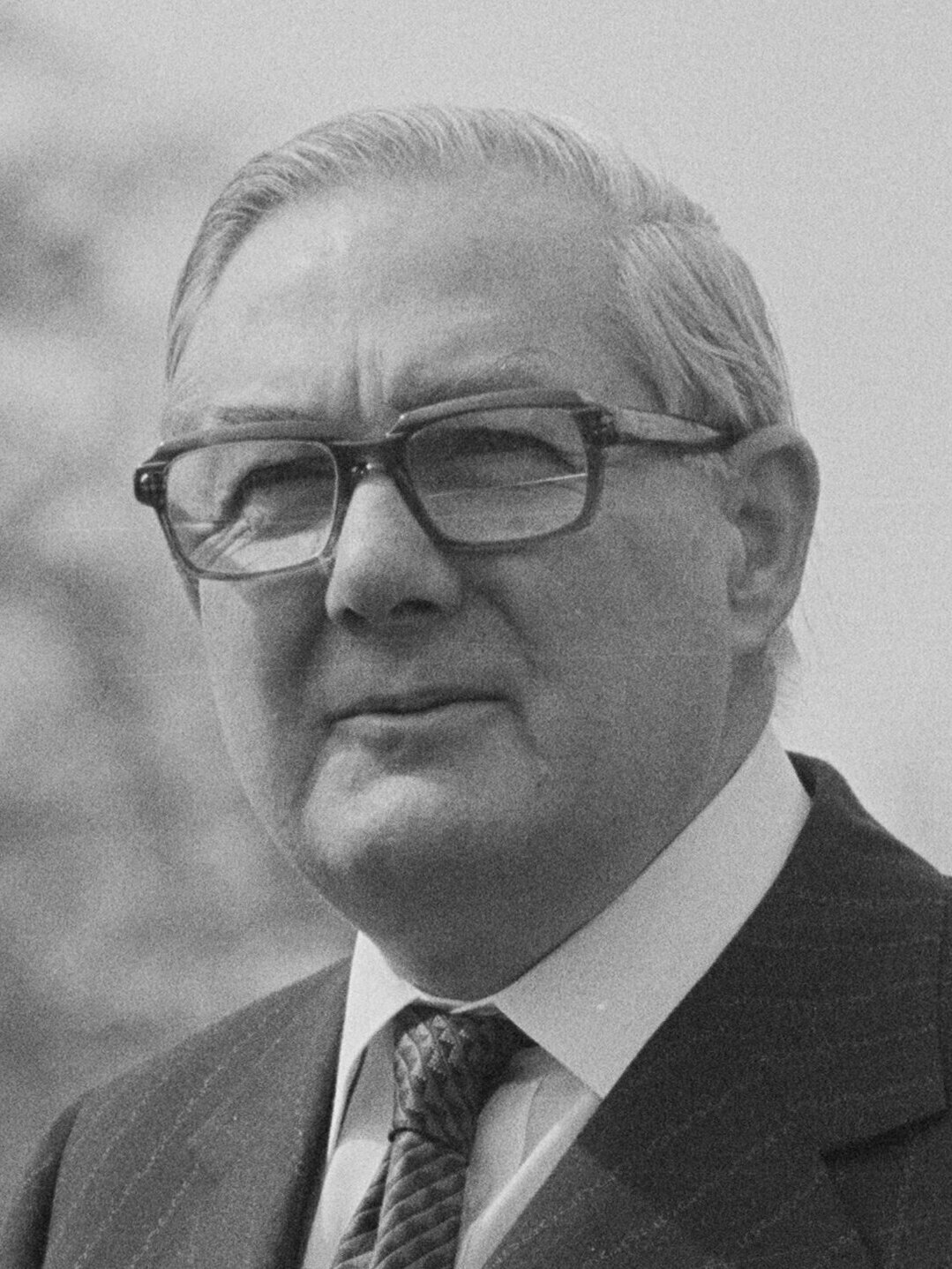

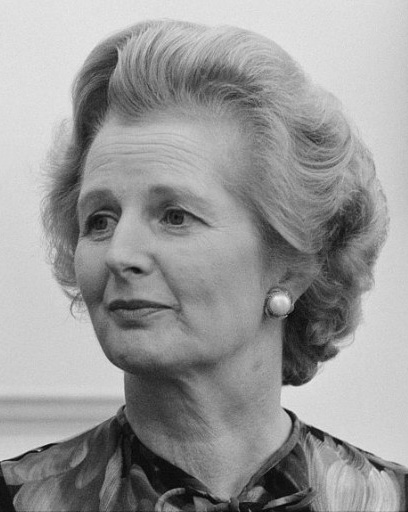

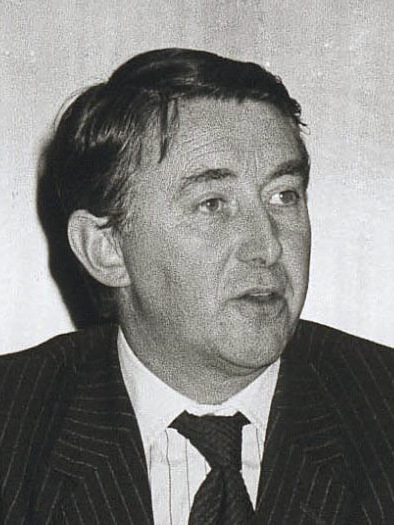
	First party	Second party
Leader	James Callaghan	Margaret Thatcher
Party	Labour	Conservative
Leader since	5 April 1976	11 February 1975
Seats won	176	136
Seat change	▲4	▲24
Popular vote	592,616	453,003
Percentage	39.6%	30.3%
Swing	▲1.1%	▲1.7%
	Third party	Fourth party
Leader	William Wolfe	David Steel
Party	SNP	Liberal
Leader since	1 June 1969	7 July 1976
Seats won	18	6
Seat change	-	▼5
Popular vote	313,062	34,284
Percentage	20.9%	2.3%
Swing	▲8.3%	▼2.8%
- Colours denote the winning party with outright control

Regional elections were held in Scotland on Tuesday 2 May 1978, as part of the Local Government (Scotland) Act 1973. They saw a resurgence of support for the Labour Party, retaining control of Strathclyde and Fife and winning Central and Lothian.

== National results ==
Summary of the 1978 Scottish regional council election results
Parties	Votes	Votes %	Wards
Labour	592,616	39.6	176
Conservative	453,003	30.3	136
SNP	313,062	20.9	18
Liberal	34,284	2.3	6
Communist	7,884	0.5	1
SLP	6,629	0.4	0
Independent Ratepayer	5,754	0.4	1
Independent Labour	4,841	0.3	1
Independent Nationalist	2,447	0.2	2
Independent Liberal	1,291	0.1	0
Workers Revolutionary	168	0.01	0
Independent	73,449	4.9	89
Total	1,495,428	100.0	431

== Results by council area ==
Council	Labour	Conservative	SNP	Liberal	Independent	Other	Turnout	Control	Details
Borders‡	0	9	1	1	11	1		Independent hold	Details
Central‡	18	6	6	0	2	2		Labour Gain	Details
Dumfries and Galloway‡	3	5	1	0	26	0		Independent hold	Details
Fife‡	24	14	1	0	2	1		Labour hold	Details
Grampian‡	13	33	2	2	3	0		Conservative Hold	Details
Highland‡	5	1	2	2	37	0		Independent Hold	Details
Lothian‡	26	18	3	1	1	0		Labour Gain	Details
Orkney‡	0	0	0	0	24			Independent Hold	Details
Shetland‡	3	0	0	0	22			Independent Hold	Details
Strathclyde‡	73	25	2	2	1	0		Labour Hold	Details
Tayside‡	15	25	0	0	6	0		Conservative Hold	Details
Na h-Eileanan Siar (Western Isles)‡	0	0	0	0	30	0		Independent Hold	Details
