= 1979 Southend-on-Sea Borough Council election =

UK local election

← 1978	3 May 1979	1980 →

14 out of 39 seats to Southend-on-Sea Borough Council 20 seats needed for a majority

	First party	Second party	Third party
Party	Conservative	Liberal	Labour
Seats won	11	2	1
Seats after	30	5	4
Seat change	▲1	Steady	▼1
Popular vote	50,821	21,121	23,202
Percentage	53.1%	22.1%	24.3%
Swing	▼5.1%	▲0.5%	▲4.7%
- Winner of each seat at the 1979 Southend-on-Sea Borough Council election.
Council control before election
Conservative
Council control after election
Conservative

The 1979 Southend-on-Sea Borough Council election took place on 3 May 1979 to elect members of Southend-on-Sea Borough Council in Essex, England. This was on the same day as the 1979 general election and other local elections.

== Summary ==
=== Election result ===
1979 Southend-on-Sea Borough Council election
Party	This election			Full council			This election		
Party	Seats	Net	Seats %	Other	Total	Total %	Votes	Votes %	+/−
Conservative	11	▲1	78.6	19	30	76.9	50,821	53.1	–5.1
Liberal	2	Steady	14.3	3	5	12.8	21,121	22.1	+0.5
Labour	1	▼1	7.1	3	4	10.3	23,202	24.3	+4.7
National Front	0	Steady	0.0	0	0	0.0	485	0.5	–0.1

== Ward results ==
Incumbent councillors standing for re-election are marked with an asterisk (*). Changes in seats do not take into account by-elections or defections.

=== Belfairs ===
Belfairs
Party	Candidate	Votes	%	±%
Conservative	V. Smith*	4,000	53.5	–15.8
Liberal	P. Oxley	2,422	32.4	+13.6
Labour	E. Newman	892	11.9	+0.1
National Front	S. McGovern	162	2.2	N/A
Majority		1,578	21.1	–29.4
Turnout		7,476	76.2	+39.7
Registered electors		9,813		
Conservative hold		Swing	▼14.7	

=== Blenheim ===
Blenheim
Party	Candidate	Votes	%	±%
Conservative	E. Watson-Lamb*	3,432	48.2	–14.2
Liberal	J. Allen	2,333	32.8	+13.6
Labour	C. Newman	1,252	17.6	+2.8
National Front	P. Twomey	103	1.4	–2.3
Majority		1,099	15.4	–27.7
Turnout		7,120	71.4	+36.9
Registered electors		9,969		
Conservative hold		Swing	▼13.9	

=== Chalkwell ===
Chalkwell (2 seats due to by-election)
Party	Candidate	Votes	%	±%
Conservative	M. Collard*	3,915	61.6	
Conservative	A. Daniels	3,773	59.4	
Liberal	P. Wllletts	1,882	29.6	
Liberal	R. Wood	1,728	27.2	
Labour	D. Bason	713	11.2	
Labour	K. Leaman	695	10.9	
Turnout		~7,306	76.9	
Registered electors		9,501		
Conservative hold				
Conservative hold				

=== Eastwood ===
Eastwood
Party	Candidate	Votes	%	±%
Conservative	V. Kaye	3,856	52.4	–15.5
Liberal	N. Goodman	2,570	34.9	+10.0
Labour	N. Boorman	934	12.7	+5.5
Majority		1,286	17.5	N/A
Turnout		7,360	76.9	+32.8
Registered electors		9,571		
Conservative hold		Swing	▼12.8	

=== Leigh ===
Leigh
Party	Candidate	Votes	%	±%
Liberal	A. Crystall*	4,026	53.4	+4.2
Conservative	L. Woodward	3,090	41.0	–5.7
Labour	H. Mapp	423	5.6	+1.5
Majority		936	12.4	+9.9
Turnout		7,539	78.4	+25.3
Registered electors		9,622		
Liberal hold		Swing	▲5.0	

=== Milton ===
Milton
Party	Candidate	Votes	%	±%
Conservative	J. Carlile*	3,229	60.1	–5.8
Labour	A. Scott	2,144	39.9	+5.8
Majority		1,085	20.2	–11.6
Turnout		5,373	61.1	+29.4
Registered electors		8,800		
Conservative hold		Swing	▼5.8	

=== Prittlewell ===
Prittlewell
Party	Candidate	Votes	%	±%
Liberal	J. Armitage	3,201	42.5	–0.8
Conservative	E. Barham	2,925	38.8	–4.7
Labour	E. Wilson	1,403	18.6	+5.5
Majority		276	3.7	N/A
Turnout		7,529	74.7	+32.7
Registered electors		10,076		
Liberal hold		Swing	▲2.0	

=== Shoebury ===
Shoebury
Party	Candidate	Votes	%	±%
Conservative	B. Hennessey*	3,998	52.8	–2.7
Labour	J. Hodgkins	2,555	33.8	±0.0
Liberal	J. O'Neill	1,016	13.4	+2.7
Majority		1,443	19.1	–2.6
Turnout		7,569	69.3	+36.9
Registered electors		10,927		
Conservative hold		Swing	▼1.4	

=== Southchurch ===
Southchurch
Party	Candidate	Votes	%	±%
Conservative	D. Garston*	4,607	64.4	–9.6
Labour	P. Harrison	2,550	35.6	+9.6
Majority		2,057	28.7	–19.4
Turnout		7,157	72.0	+42.8
Registered electors		9,938		
Conservative hold		Swing	▼9.6	

=== St Lukes ===
St Lukes
Party	Candidate	Votes	%	±%
Conservative	B. Fowler	2,861	48.5	+0.5
Labour	G. Caplan*	2,821	47.8	+1.7
National Front	V. Twomey	220	3.7	–2.2
Majority		40	0.7	–1.2
Turnout		5,902	67.0	+37.8
Registered electors		8,805		
Conservative gain from Labour		Swing	▼0.6	

=== Thorpe ===
Thorpe
Party	Candidate	Votes	%	±%
Conservative	B. Scholfield*	5,388	77.3	–7.4
Labour	M. Hurley	1,579	22.7	+7.4
Majority		3,809	54.7	–14.7
Turnout		6,967	73.5	+39.1
Registered electors		9,482		
Conservative hold		Swing	▼7.4	

=== Victoria ===
Victoria
Party	Candidate	Votes	%	±%
Labour	G. Elvin*	3,206	50.3	–0.3
Conservative	D. Hopkins	3,163	49.7	+0.3
Majority		43	0.7	–0.6
Turnout		6,369	65.6	+39.3
Registered electors		9,704		
Labour hold		Swing	▼0.3	

=== Westborough ===
Westborough
Party	Candidate	Votes	%	±%
Conservative	G. Littler	2,584	39.4	–5.5
Labour	A. Hurst	2,035	31.0	–2.5
Liberal	R. Price	1,943	29.6	+8.0
Majority		549	8.4	–3.1
Turnout		6,562	72.3	+27.6
Registered electors		9,077		
Conservative hold		Swing	▼1.5	
