= 1982 Lewisham London Borough Council election =

1982 local election in England

Elections to Lewisham London Borough Council were held in May 1982. The whole council was up for election. Turnout was 36.4%.

== Election result ==
Lewisham local election result 1982
Party	Seats	Gains	Losses	Net gain/loss	Seats %	Votes %	Votes	+/−
Labour	41					39.0		
Conservative	26					35.9		
Alliance	1					23.6		

== Ward results ==
Bellingham (2)
Party	Candidate	Votes	%	±%

Blackheath (2)
Party	Candidate	Votes	%	±%

Blythe Hill (2)
Party	Candidate	Votes	%	±%

Catford (2)
Party	Candidate	Votes	%	±%

Churchdown (3)
Party	Candidate	Votes	%	±%

Crofton Park (3)
Party	Candidate	Votes	%	±%

Downham (3)
Party	Candidate	Votes	%	±%
Labour	Thomas I. Bradley	1,393	48.9	
Labour	Frederick A. Barrett	1,380		
Labour	Norman Smith	1,374		
Conservative	E. Heyes	862	30.3	
Conservative	B. Taylor	825		
Conservative	Ms J. Partington	813		
Alliance	Ms M. Drummond	532	18.7	
Alliance	P. McHugh	508		
Alliance	W. Scally	495		
Community	G. Roberts	59	2.1	
Total votes			37.7%	
Registered electors		8,187		
Labour win				
Labour win				
Labour win				

Drake (3)
Party	Candidate	Votes	%	±%

Evelyn (3)
Party	Candidate	Votes	%	±%

Forest Hill (2)
Party	Candidate	Votes	%	±%

Grinling Gibbons (3)
Party	Candidate	Votes	%	±%

Grove Park (2)
Party	Candidate	Votes	%	±%

Hither Green (3)
Party	Candidate	Votes	%	±%

Horniman (3)
Party	Candidate	Votes	%	±%

Ladywell (3)
Party	Candidate	Votes	%	±%

Manor Lee (2)
Party	Candidate	Votes	%	±%

Marlowe (3)
Party	Candidate	Votes	%	±%

Pepys (3)
Party	Candidate	Votes	%	±%

Perry Hill (3)
Party	Candidate	Votes	%	±%

Rushey Green (2)
Party	Candidate	Votes	%	±%

St Andrew (2)
Party	Candidate	Votes	%	±%

St Margaret (2)
Party	Candidate	Votes	%	±%

St Mildred (3)
Party	Candidate	Votes	%	±%

Sydenham East (3)
Party	Candidate	Votes	%	±%

Sydenham West (3)
Party	Candidate	Votes	%	±%

Whitefoot (2)
Party	Candidate	Votes	%	±%
