= 1982 Fife Regional Council election =

1982 Scottish local government election

← 1978	6 May 1982	1986 →

All 46 seats to Fife Regional Council 24 seats needed for a majority
	First party	Second party	Third party
Party	Labour	Conservative	Alliance
Last election	24	14	0
Seats won	27	10	4
Seat change	▲3	▼4	▲4
Popular vote	42,549	20,594	22,348
Percentage	40.4%	19.6%	21.2%
	Fourth party	Fifth party	Sixth party
Party	Independent	SNP	Communist
Last election	2	1	1
Seats won	2	1	1
Seat change	0	0	0
Popular vote	6,161	10,271	3,021
Percentage	5.9%	9.8%	2.9%
- Results by electoral division.
Council control before election
Labour
Council control after election
Labour

The third election to Fife Regional Council was held on 6 May 1982 as part of the wider 1982 Scottish regional elections. The election saw Labour maintaining their control of the region's 46-seat council.

== Aggregate results ==
Fife Regional election, 1982 Turnout: 43.2%
Party	Seats	Gains	Losses	Net gain/loss	Seats %	Votes %	Votes	+/−
Labour	27				60.0	40.4	42,549	
Conservative	10				22.2	19.6	20,594	
Alliance	4	4	0	4	8.9	21.2	22,348	
Independent	2				4.4	5.9	6,161	
SNP	1				2.2	9.8	10,271	
Communist	1	0	0	0	2.2	2.9	3,021	
Democratic Socialist Party	0	0	0	0	0.0	0.3	264	New
