= 1978 Rochford District Council election =

UK local election

- 4 May 1978

14 out of 40 seats to Rochford District Council 21 seats needed for a majority

	First party	Second party	Third party
Party	Conservative	Independent	Residents
Seats won	9	0	1
Seats after	27	5	2
Seat change	▼2	Steady	Steady
Popular vote	8,230	did not stand	1,203
Percentage	60.8%	did not stand	8.9%
Swing	▲4.5%	▼7.4%	▲4.5%
	Fourth party	Fifth party
Party	Labour	Liberal
Seats won	1	1
Seats after	2	2
Seat change	▲1	Steady
Popular vote	2,649	1,465
Percentage	19.6%	10.8%
Swing	▲0.1%	▼1.6%
Council control before election
Conservative
Council control after election
Conservative

The 1978 Rochford District Council election took place on 4 May 1978 to elect members of Rochford District Council in Essex, England. This was on the same day as other local elections.

== Summary ==
=== Election result ===
1978 Rochford District Council election
Party	This election			Full council			This election		
Party	Seats	Net	Seats %	Other	Total	Total %	Votes	Votes %	+/−
Conservative	9	▼2	64.3	18	27	67.5	8,230	60.8	+4.5
Independent	0	Steady	0.0	6	5	12.5	N/A	N/A	–3.6
Residents	3	▲1	21.4	1	4	10.0	1,203	8.9	+4.5
Labour	1	▲1	7.1	1	2	5.0	2,649	19.6	+0.1
Liberal	1	Steady	7.1	1	2	5.0	1,465	10.8	–1.6

== Ward results ==
Incumbent councillors standing for re-election are marked with an asterisk (*).

=== Downhall ===
Downhall
Party	Candidate	Votes	%	±%
Conservative	L. Cope*	1,015	91.4	+14.4
Liberal	J. Ralph	95	8.6	–14.4
Majority		920	82.9	N/A
Turnout		1,110	45.8	–7.3
Registered electors		2,458		
Conservative hold		Swing	▲14.4	

=== Grange & Rawreth ===
Grange & Rawreth
Party	Candidate	Votes	%	±%
Conservative	K. Bowen	799	54.8	–5.2
Labour	C. Gowlett	659	45.2	+5.2
Majority		140	9.6	N/A
Turnout		1,458	45.1	–4.3
Registered electors		3,268		
Conservative hold		Swing	▼5.2	

=== Hawkwell East ===
Hawkwell East
Party	Candidate	Votes	%	±%
Conservative	J. Sheaf*	Unopposed		
Registered electors		4,101		
Conservative hold				

=== Hockley East ===
Hockley East
Party	Candidate	Votes	%	±%
Residents	S. Barnard*	673	51.7	–17.4
Conservative	M. Anderson	628	48.3	+17.4
Majority		45	3.5	N/A
Turnout		1,117	43.3	+5.2
Registered electors		3,046		
Residents hold		Swing	▼17.4	

=== Hullbridge Riverside ===
Hullbridge Riverside
Party	Candidate	Votes	%	±%
Residents	J. Nokes	530	55.9	N/A
Conservative	R. Moody	418	44.1	–7.5
Majority		112	11.8	N/A
Turnout		948	36.5	–8.0
Registered electors		2,627		
Residents gain from Conservative				

=== Hullbridge South ===
Hullbridge South
Party	Candidate	Votes	%	±%
Residents	L. Campbell-Daley*	Unopposed		
Registered electors		2,066		
Residents hold				

=== Lodge ===
Lodge
Party	Candidate	Votes	%	±%
Conservative	J. Murison	1,153	70.3	+17.3
Labour	W. Campbell	488	29.7	+5.2
Majority		665	40.5	N/A
Turnout		1,641	37.9	–9.8
Registered electors		4,385		
Conservative hold		Swing	▲6.1	

=== Rayleigh Central ===
Rayleigh Central
Party	Candidate	Votes	%	±%
Conservative	R. Foster*	750	70.2	+31.7
Labour	S. Andre	318	29.8	+14.5
Majority		432	40.4	N/A
Turnout		1,068	40.0	–9.3
Registered electors		2,720		
Conservative hold		Swing	▲8.6	

=== Rochford Eastwood ===
Rochford Eastwood
Party	Candidate	Votes	%	±%
Conservative	W. Budge	409	64.6	+6.2
Labour	E. Spearman	224	35.4	–6.2
Majority		185	29.2	+12.5
Turnout		633	48.0	–6.2
Registered electors		1,327		
Conservative hold		Swing	▲6.2	

=== Rochford Roche ===
Rochford Roche
Party	Candidate	Votes	%	±%
Labour	C. Stephenson	424	54.4	+5.4
Conservative	N. Heard*	356	45.6	–5.4
Majority		68	8.7	N/A
Turnout		780	55.3	–1.0
Registered electors		1,451		
Labour gain from Conservative		Swing	▲5.4	

=== Rochford St Andrews ===
Rochford St Andrews
Party	Candidate	Votes	%	±%
Conservative	M. Garlick*	553	65.1	+9.4
Labour	J. Chittenden	297	34.9	–9.4
Majority		256	30.1	N/A
Turnout		850	33.8	–8.4
Registered electors		2,551		
Conservative hold		Swing	▲9.4	

=== Trinity ===
Trinity
Party	Candidate	Votes	%	±%
Liberal	R. Boyd*	867	56.6	+9.7
Conservative	J. Gibson	664	43.4	–9.7
Majority		203	13.3	N/A
Turnout		1,531	59.1	+8.0
Registered electors		2,633		
Liberal hold		Swing	▲9.7	

=== Wheatley ===
Wheatley
Party	Candidate	Votes	%	±%
Conservative	B. Lovett*	752	81.9	+12.0
Liberal	C. Elsey	166	18.1	–12.0
Majority		586	63.8	N/A
Turnout		918	38.3	–9.0
Registered electors		2,448		
Conservative hold		Swing	▲12.0	

=== Whitehouse ===
Whitehouse
Party	Candidate	Votes	%	±%
Conservative	B. Taylor	733	56.0	–14.8
Liberal	D. Helson	337	25.7	–3.5
Labour	G. Wade	239	18.3	N/A
Majority		396	30.3	N/A
Turnout		1,309	50.3	+11.4
Registered electors		2,636		
Conservative hold		Swing	▼5.7	
