= 1978 Welwyn Hatfield District Council election =

Welwyn Hatfield District Council election

- 4 May 1978

16 out of 43 seats to Welwyn Hatfield District Council 23 seats needed for a majority
- Turnout: ~36,191, 54.7%

	First party	Second party	Third party
Party	Conservative	Labour	Liberal
Last election	24 seats, 55.2%	19 seats, 38.6%	0 seats, 5.4%
Seats before	24	19	0
Seats after	23	20	0
Seat change	▼1	▲1	Steady
Popular vote	20,742	19,128	1,164
Percentage	50.2%	46.9%	2.9%
Swing	▼5.0	▲8.3	▼3.2
- Council composition following the election.

The 1978 Welwyn Hatfield District Council election took place on 4 May 1978 to elect members of Welwyn Hatfield District Council in England. This was on the same day as other local elections. A third of the total seats were up for election, one for each ward plus an additional seat in the wards for Hatfield East and Peartree. While the Labour party made notable gains in the popular vote at the cost of the Conservative and Liberal parties, they only took one seat from the Conservatives. This meant the Conservatives kept their majority control of the council, albeit only just.

== Summary ==
=== Election result ===
1978 Welwyn Hatfield District Council election
Party	This election			Full council			This election		
Party	Seats	Net	Seats %	Other	Total	Total %	Votes	Votes %	+/−
Conservative	7	▼1	43.8	16	23	53.5	20,462	50.2	–5.0
Labour	9	▲1	56.3	11	20	46.5	19,128	46.9	+8.3
Liberal	0	Steady	0.0	0	0	0.0	1,164	2.9	–3.2
