= 1978 Colchester Borough Council election =

1978 English local government election

- 4 May 1978

19 out of 60 seats to Colchester Borough Council 31 seats needed for a majority
- Registered: 77,337
- Turnout: 43.5% (▼4.0%)
	First party	Second party
Party	Conservative	Labour
Last election	39 seats, 55.9%	18 seats, 31.7%
Seats won	10	8
Seats after	37	21
Seat change	▼2	▲3
Popular vote	17,478	13,720
Percentage	53.1%	41.7%
Swing	▼2.8%	▲10.0%
	Third party	Fourth party
Party	Residents	Independent
Last election	2 seats, 3.1%	1 seat, 1.5%
Seats won	0	1
Seats after	1	1
Seat change	▼1	Steady
Popular vote	740	N/A (Note: The only Independent candidate standing at this election was elected unopposed.)
Percentage	2.2%	N/A
Swing	▼0.9%	▼1.7%
- Winner of each seat at the 1978 Colchester Borough Council election.
Council control before election
Conservative
Council control after election
Conservative

The 1978 Colchester Borough Council elections were held in 4 May 1978 to elect members of Colchester Borough Council in Essex, England. This was on the same day as other local elections across the United Kingdom.

Although broadly maintaining their vote share and control of the council, the Conservatives lost three seats to Labour, whilst managing to unseat a Residents Association councillor in Tiptree ward.

== Summary ==
=== Election result ===
1978 Colchester Borough Council election
Party	This election				Full council			This election		
Party	Candidates	Seats	Net	Seats %	Other	Total	Total %	Votes	Votes %	+/−
Conservative	18	10	▼2	52.6	27	37	61.7	17,478	53.1	−2.8
Labour	18	8	▲3	42.1	13	21	35.0	13,720	41.7	+10.0
Residents	1	0	▼1	0.0	1	1	1.7	740	2.2	−0.9
Independent	1	1	Steady	5.3	0	1	1.7	N/A	N/A	−1.7
Liberal	4	0	Steady	0.0	0	0	0.0	974	3.0	−4.9

== Ward results ==
=== Berechurch ===
Berechurch
Party	Candidate	Votes	%	±%
Labour	R. McQuitty	953	40.5	+4.2
Conservative	L. Long	836	35.5	+0.5
Liberal	M. Gage	565	24.0	–4.8
Majority		127	5.0	N/A
Turnout		2,354	41.6	+3.5
Registered electors		5,652		
Labour gain from Conservative		Swing	▲1.9	

=== Birch-Messing ===
Birch-Messing
Party	Candidate	Votes	%	±%
Independent	T. Wayman	Unopposed		
Registered electors		1,296		
Independent hold				

No Conservative candidate as previous.

=== Boxted & Langham ===
Boxted & Langham
Party	Candidate	Votes	%	±%
Conservative	A. Sexton	589	63.0	–22.2
Labour	J. Bensusan-Butt	346	37.0	+22.2
Majority		243	26.0	−44.4
Turnout		935	57.0	+5.3
Registered electors		1,640		
Conservative hold		Swing	▼22.2	

=== Castle ===
Castle
Party	Candidate	Votes	%	±%
Labour	Ken Cooke	1,406	56.9	+9.0
Conservative	G. Jefferies	912	36.9	–6.8
Liberal	D. Stephenson	154	6.2	–2.2
Majority		494	20.0	N/A
Turnout		2,472	50.4	+1.2
Registered electors		4,902		
Labour hold		Swing	▲7.9	

=== Harbour ===
Harbour
Party	Candidate	Votes	%	±%
Labour	Rod Green	1,347	56.4	+10.8
Conservative	E. White	1,041	43.5	+1.4
Majority		306	12.9	N/A
Turnout		2,388	48.8	+2.9
Registered electors		4,889		
Labour gain from Conservative		Swing	▲4.7	

No Liberal candidate as previous (–12.1).

=== Lexden ===
Lexden
Party	Candidate	Votes	%	±%
Conservative	D. Holt	1,614	81.5	+19.7
Labour	D. Pitchford	367	18.5	+2.6
Majority		1,247	63.0	N/A
Turnout		1,981	48.2	–10.1
Registered electors		3,864		
Conservative hold		Swing	▲8.6	

No Liberal candidate as previous (–22.3).

=== Mile End ===
Mile End
Party	Candidate	Votes	%	±%
Conservative	J. Fulford	1,092	67.8	–1.8
Labour	Tim Oxton	518	32.2	+1.8
Majority		574	35.6	N/A
Turnout		1,610	44.9	–2.3
Registered electors		3,582		
Conservative hold		Swing	▼1.8	

=== New Town ===
New Town
Party	Candidate	Votes	%	±%
Labour	Jim Orpe	1,169	56.6	+4.2
Conservative	L. Leader	769	37.2	+11.1
Liberal	M. Pawsey	127	6.2	–15.2
Majority		400	19.4	N/A
Turnout		2,065	44.7	–4.0
Registered electors		4,620		
Labour hold		Swing	▼3.5	

=== Prettygate ===
Prettygate
Party	Candidate	Votes	%	±%
Conservative	D. Purvis	1,523	68.7	+12.6
Labour	R. Lown	693	31.3	+4.3
Majority		830	37.5	N/A
Turnout		2,216	45.6	–1.4
Registered electors		4,855		
Conservative hold		Swing	▲4.2	

No Liberal candidate as previous (–16.9).

=== Shrub End ===
Shrub End
Party	Candidate	Votes	%	±%
Labour	E. Plowright	1,044	59.3	–3.9
Conservative	J. Nicholls	716	32.8	+3.9
Majority		328	18.6	N/A
Turnout		1,760	32.8	–14.5
Registered electors		5,362		
Labour hold		Swing	▼3.9	

=== St. Andrew's ===
St. Andrew's
Party	Candidate	Votes	%	±%
Labour	Graham Bober	1,374	67.0	–5.3
Conservative	Nigel Chapman	676	33.0	+5.3
Majority		698	34.0	N/A
Turnout		2,050	30.9	–1.0
Registered electors		6,628		
Labour hold		Swing	▼5.3	

=== St. Anne's ===
St. Anne's
Party	Candidate	Votes	%	±%
Labour	R. Marchant	1,016	56.9	+2.1
Conservative	D. Sissons	770	43.1	–2.1
Majority		246	13.8	N/A
Turnout		1,786	42.3	+4.2
Registered electors		4,225		
Labour hold		Swing	▲2.1	

=== St. John's ===
St. John's
Party	Candidate	Votes	%	±%
Conservative	M. Pinnock	1,132	70.7	+2.6
Labour	P. Treacher	470	29.3	–2.6
Majority		662	41.3	N/A
Turnout		1,602	46.7	–2.4
Registered electors		3,432		
Conservative hold		Swing	▲2.6	

=== St. Mary's ===
St. Mary's
Party	Candidate	Votes	%	±%
Conservative	R. Hilham	1,431	66.1	+7.1
Labour	S. McAndrew	453	20.9	–0.1
Liberal	William Spyvee	282	13.0	–7.0
Majority		978	45.2	N/A
Turnout		2,166	45.4	–5.4
Registered electors		4,776		
Conservative hold		Swing	▲3.6	

=== Stanway ===
Stanway
Party	Candidate	Votes	%	±%
Conservative	D. Arrondelle	942	54.3	+1.5
Labour	E. Kirkby	793	45.7	–1.5
Majority		149	8.6	N/A
Turnout		1,735	48.2	–4.0
Registered electors		3,601		
Conservative hold		Swing	▲1.5	

=== Tiptree ===
Tiptree
Party	Candidate	Votes	%	±%
Conservative	R. Martin	950	48.8	+9.8
Residents	J. Webb	740	38.0	–1.0
Labour	J. Greer	256	13.2	–8.8
Majority		210	10.8	N/A
Turnout		1,946	35.4	–11.5
Registered electors		5,496		
Conservative gain from Residents		Swing	▲5.4	

=== West Bergholt ===
West Bergholt
Party	Candidate	Votes	%	±%
Conservative	J. Lampon	692	82.1	+0.6
Labour	Jean Quinn	151	17.9	+7.1
Majority		541	64.2	–6.7
Turnout		843	47.4	±0.0
Registered electors		1,779		
Conservative hold		Swing	▼3.3	

=== Winstree ===
Winstree
Party	Candidate	Votes	%	±%
Conservative	M. Fairhead	808	79.4	+6.6
Labour	V. McAndrew	210	20.6	–2.9
Majority		598	58.7	–1.9
Turnout		1,018	54.4	–6.2
Registered electors		1,871		
Conservative hold		Swing	▲4.8	

No Independent candidate as previous (–3.7).

=== Wivenhoe ===
Wivenhoe
Party	Candidate	Votes	%	±%
Labour	J. Bayles	1,154	54.0	+10.6
Conservative	K. Brereton	985	46.0	–10.6
Majority		169	8.0	N/A
Turnout		2,139	43.6	+0.7
Registered electors		4,907		
Labour gain from Conservative		Swing	▲10.6	
