= 1980 Southend-on-Sea Borough Council election =

1980 English local election

← 1979	1 May 1980	1982 →

14 out of 39 seats to Southend-on-Sea Borough Council 20 seats needed for a majority

	First party	Second party	Third party
Party	Conservative	Labour	Liberal
Seats won	7	4	3
Seats after	26	7	6
Seat change	▼3	▲2	▲1
Popular vote	22,733	13,471	14,042
Percentage	44.4%	26.3%	27.4%
Swing	▼8.7%	▲2.0%	▲5.3%
- Winner of each seat at the 1980 Southend-on-Sea Borough Council election.
Council control before election
Conservative
Council control after election
Conservative

The 1980 Southend-on-Sea Borough Council election took place on 1 May 1980 to elect members of Southend-on-Sea Borough Council in Essex, England. This was on the same day as other local elections.

== Summary ==
=== Election result ===
1980 Southend-on-Sea Borough Council election
Party	This election			Full council			This election		
Party	Seats	Net	Seats %	Other	Total	Total %	Votes	Votes %	+/−
Conservative	7	▼3	50.0	19	26	66.7	22,733	44.4	–8.7
Labour	4	▲2	28.6	3	7	17.9	13,471	26.3	+2.0
Liberal	3	▲1	21.4	3	6	15.4	14,042	27.4	+5.3
Independent	0	Steady	0.0	0	0	0.0	617	1.2	N/A
New Britain	0	Steady	0.0	0	0	0.0	294	0.6	N/A

== Ward results ==
Incumbent councillors standing for re-election are marked with an asterisk (*). Changes in seats do not take into account by-elections or defections.

=== Belfairs ===
Belfairs
Party	Candidate	Votes	%	±%
Conservative	B. Marriott*	1,987	56.8	+3.3
Liberal	B. Griggs	1,081	30.9	–1.5
Labour	H. Hurst	433	12.4	+0.5
Majority		906	25.9	+4.8
Turnout		3,501	35.7	–40.5
Registered electors		9,800		
Conservative hold		Swing	▲2.4	

=== Blenheim ===
Blenheim
Party	Candidate	Votes	%	±%
Conservative	N. Clarke*	1,695	51.4	+3.2
Liberal	J. Allen	1,015	30.8	–2.0
Labour	C. Newman	587	17.8	+0.2
Majority		680	20.6	+5.2
Turnout		3,297	36.7	–34.7
Registered electors		9,491		
Conservative hold		Swing	▲2.6	

=== Chalkwell ===
Chalkwell
Party	Candidate	Votes	%	±%
Conservative	N. Harris*	2,044	58.7	–1.4
Liberal	P. Willetts	1,064	30.6	+1.7
Labour	D. Bason	374	10.7	–0.3
Majority		980	28.1	N/A
Turnout		3,482	36.7	–40.2
Registered electors		9,491		
Conservative hold		Swing	▼1.6	

=== Eastwood ===
Eastwood
Party	Candidate	Votes	%	±%
Conservative	M. Myers*	1,717	50.1	–2.3
Liberal	N. Goodman	1,257	36.7	+1.8
Labour	N. Boorman	455	13.3	+0.6
Majority		460	13.4	–4.1
Turnout		3,429	34.3	–42.6
Registered electors		9,983		
Conservative hold		Swing	▼2.1	

=== Leigh ===
Leigh
Party	Candidate	Votes	%	±%
Liberal	G. Robson	2,352	50.7	–2.7
Conservative	M. Dolby	2,004	43.2	+2.2
Labour	L. Davidson	283	6.1	+0.5
Majority		348	7.5	–4.9
Turnout		4,639	48.7	–29.7
Registered electors		9,520		
Liberal hold		Swing	▼2.5	

=== Milton ===
Milton
Party	Candidate	Votes	%	±%
Conservative	G. Baum*	1,116	41.6	–18.5
Labour	P. Griffiths	714	26.6	–13.3
Independent	M. Burstin	617	23.0	N/A
Liberal	R. Wood	238	8.9	N/A
Majority		402	15.0	–5.2
Turnout		2,685	30.9	–30.2
Registered electors		8,689		
Conservative hold		Swing	▼2.6	

=== Prittlewell ===
Prittlewell
Party	Candidate	Votes	%	±%
Liberal	P. Herbert*	1,812	44.5	+2.0
Conservative	E. Barham	1,483	36.4	–2.4
Labour	E. Wilson	775	19.0	+0.4
Majority		329	8.1	+4.4
Turnout		4,070	40.6	–34.1
Registered electors		10,024		
Liberal hold		Swing	▲2.1	

=== Shoebury ===
Shoebury (2 seats due to by-election)
Party	Candidate	Votes	%	±%
Labour	G. Caplan	1,901	44.2	
Labour	A. Hurst	1,834	42.6	
Conservative	D. Ascroft*	1,778	41.3	
Conservative	B. Kelly	1,509	35.1	
Liberal	B. Ayling	846	19.7	
Liberal	J. O'Neill	734	17.1	
Turnout		~4,302	38.7	
Registered electors		11,126		
Labour gain from Conservative				
Labour gain from Conservative				

=== Southchurch ===
Southchurch
Party	Candidate	Votes	%	±%
Conservative	E. Lockhart*	2,040	54.9	–9.5
Labour	A. Pendle	1,181	31.8	–3.8
Liberal	J. Flaum	492	13.3	N/A
Majority		859	23.1	–5.6
Turnout		3,713	37.4	–34.6
Registered electors		9,926		
Conservative hold		Swing	▼2.9	

=== St Lukes ===
St Lukes
Party	Candidate	Votes	%	±%
Labour	R. Copley*	1,477	55.5	+7.7
Conservative	N. Goldsmith	844	31.7	–16.8
Liberal	R. O'Neill	341	12.8	N/A
Majority		633	23.8	N/A
Turnout		2,662	30.6	–36.1
Registered electors		8,692		
Labour hold		Swing	▲12.3	

=== Thorpe ===
Thorpe
Party	Candidate	Votes	%	±%
Conservative	E. Pollitt*	2,194	61.1	–16.2
Liberal	N. Baker	569	15.9	–N/A
Labour	P. Hurley	531	14.8	–7.9
New Britain	G. Martin	294	8.2	N/A
Majority		1,625	45.3	–9.4
Turnout		3,588	37.9	–35.6
Registered electors		9,476		
Conservative hold				

=== Victoria ===
Victoria
Party	Candidate	Votes	%	±%
Labour	B. Bowyer*	1,767	48.5	–1.8
Conservative	D. Hopkins	1,057	29.0	–20.7
Liberal	D. Evans	820	22.5	N/A
Majority		710	19.5	+18.9
Turnout		3,644	37.4	–28.2
Registered electors		9,744		
Labour hold		Swing	▲9.5	

=== Westborough ===
Westborough
Party	Candidate	Votes	%	±%
Liberal	R. Price	1,421	37.0	+7.4
Conservative	R. Brown	1,265	32.9	–6.5
Labour	N. Smith	1,159	30.1	–0.9
Majority		156	4.1	N/A
Turnout		3,845	42.0	–30.3
Registered electors		9,146		
Liberal gain from Conservative		Swing	▲7.0	
