= Norman Smith (mayor) =

British mayor

Mayor of the London Borough of Lewisham
- In office 1983–1984
- Preceded by: John Henry
- Succeeded by: Les Eytle
- In office 1986–1988
- Preceded by: Margaret Sandra
- Succeeded by: Peggy Muriel Fitzsimmons

Personal details
- Born: Norman Smith; 25 January 1919 Leigh
- Died: 3 March 1993 (aged 74) Downham
- Resting place: Lewisham Crematorium
- Party: Labour
- Spouse: Joan Margery Smith (née Parkinson)
- Occupation: Turner and fitter

Norman Smith (25 January 1919 – 3 March 1993) was a British councillor of the London Borough of Lewisham from 1978 until 1990, and civil Mayor of Lewisham for three terms.

== Personal life ==
Smith was born in Leigh on 25 January 1919, descended from colliers. He married Joan Margery Parkinson in Lewisham in 1945 and they lived together on the Downham Estate. Joan had been born in Greenwich on 7 October 1925.

Smith supported Millwall F.C. He died on 3 March 1993, and his wife Joan followed him on 6 July 2006.

== Community work ==
Smith was Chairman of the Downham (Wesley Halls) Community Association from at least 1979. The Association's records reflect that his contributions included cutting the grass and repairing broken windows.

== Local councillor ==
Together with Thomas I. Bradley and Frederick A. Barrett, Smith was elected Labour councillor for the Downham ward of the London Borough of Lewisham in successive local elections in 1978, 1982 and 1986, winning the majority on all three occasions. Labour's run in Downham came to an end when the Liberal Democrat Focus Team obtained the greater share of the vote in the 1990 local elections and a 1992 by-election.

== Mayor of Lewisham ==
Smith served three terms as Mayor of Lewisham, in 1983–4, and from 1986 until 1988.

His mayoral engagements included:

- Welcoming Princess Diana to Deptford when she visited The Albany arts centre on 23 May 1984; and
- Greeting Prince Charles in Deptford High Street on 18 July 1986, when Charles opened the Deptford Enterprise Agency.

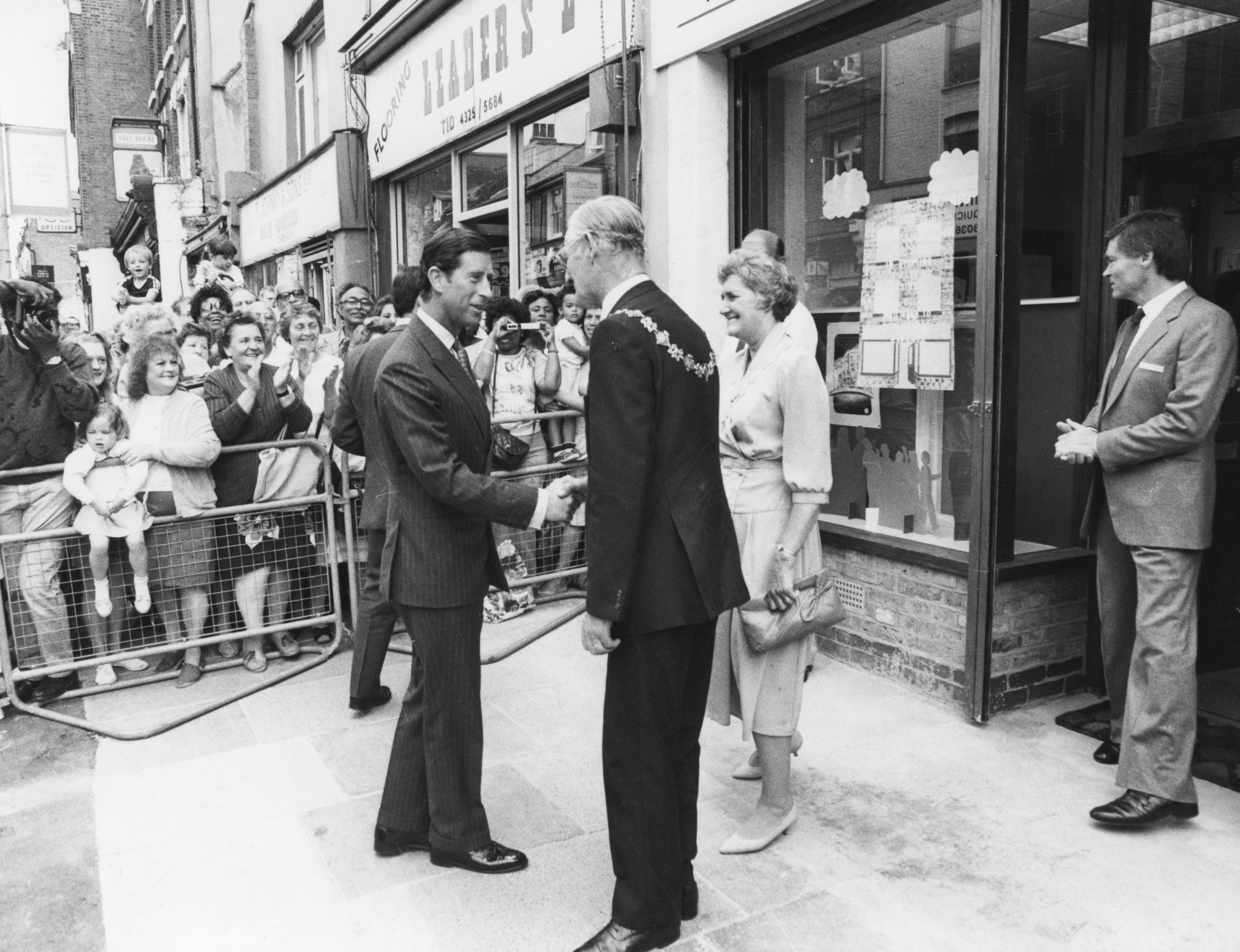
Norman and Joan Smith greeting Charles, then Prince of Wales, in Deptford High Street, 18 July 1986

In November 1986, Smith traded places for a day with 77-year-old great-grandmother Daisy Williamson, a former cleaner of Bellingham, South East London, after Williamson wrote a poem about her dream of being mayor. Smith took up Williamson's dustpan and pinny and waited on her at Lewisham Town Hall, while Williamson donned Smith's mayoral regalia.

As Mayor, Smith's unveilings included:

- On 14 March 1987, together with British Rail Area Manager Nicholas Woods, a plaque commemorating the London and Greenwich Railway at Deptford railway station; and
- On 2 May 1987, a maroon plaque memorialising Richard Jefferies at 20 Sydenham Park Road, London SE26 4ED.

In June 1987, Smith joined Glenda Jackson in launching the Reminiscence Centre in Blackheath, a centre for creative activities for older people run by Age Exchange.

In October 1987 Smith attended the launch of the Festival of London, following which a correspondent for the Daily Telegraph reported:

"Having told me he believes that people are fed up with boring mayors, the cheerful Smith promptly leapt on to the stage with the town crier to dance a calypso to a steel band".

== Memorials ==
A plaque in the vestibule of St Barnabas Church, Downham reads:

“THE GROUNDS OF THIS CHURCH WERE IMPROVED BY THE COUNCIL IN MEMORY OF THE LIFE OF NORMAN SMITH, FORMER MAYOR OF LEWISHAM AND LONG STANDING MEMBER OF THIS CONGREGATION. JULY 1993”.

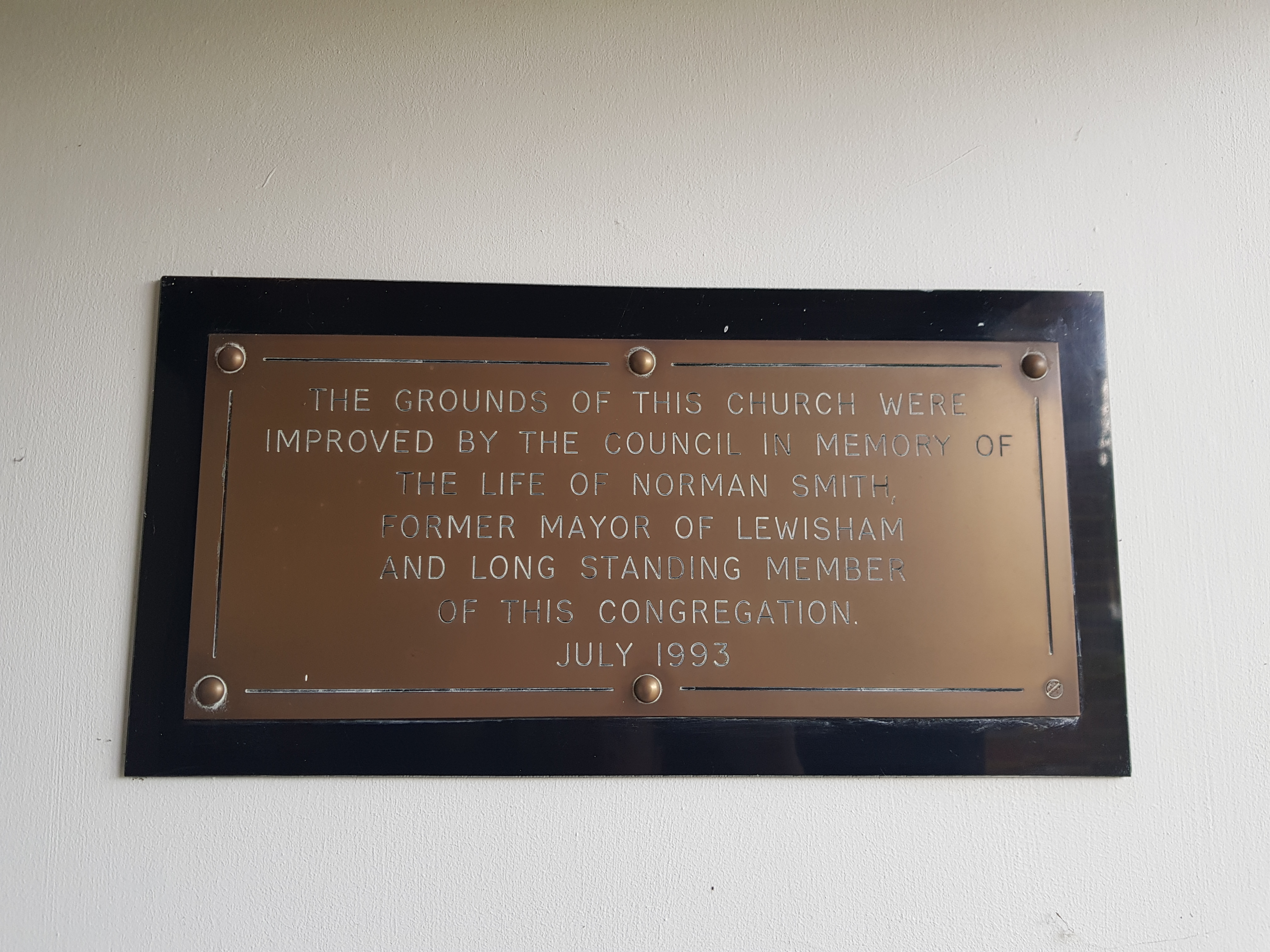
Memorial plaque for Norman Smith in the vestibule of St Barnabas Church, Downham, Bromley BR1 5PS

In the church grounds stands a red bench bearing a plaque which reads:

“In Memory of NORMAN SMITH Councillor 1978-1990 and his wife JOAN, former Mayor and Mayoress of Lewisham, for their valuable contribution to the Community of St Barnabas and Downham.”
