= 1978 Hertsmere Borough Council election =

Local election in England

- 4 May 1978

14 out of 39 seats to Hertsmere Borough Council 20 seats needed for a majority
- Registered: 44,578
- Turnout: 49.4% (▲0.6%)

	First party	Second party	Third party
Party	Conservative	Labour	Liberal
Seats won	10	2	2
Seats after	25	10	4
Seat change	Steady	Steady	Steady
Popular vote	13,422	4,844	4,962
Percentage	57.4%	20.7%	21.2%
Swing	▲1.9%	▼5.0%	▲2.4%
- Winner of each seat at the 1978 Hertsmere Borough Council election. Seats in white were not contested.
Control before election
Conservative
Control after election
Conservative

The 1978 Hertsmere Borough Council election took place on 4 May 1978 to elect members of Hertsmere Borough Council in Hertfordshire, England. This was on the same day as other local elections.

== Summary ==
=== Election result ===
1978 Hertsmere Borough Council election
Party	This election				Full council			This election		
Party	Candidates	Seats	Net	Seats %	Other	Total	Total %	Votes	Votes %	+/−
Conservative	{{{candidates}}}	10	Steady	71.4	15	25	64.1	13,422	57.4	+1.9
Labour	{{{candidates}}}	2	Steady	14.3	8	10	25.6	4,844	20.7	–5.0
Liberal	{{{candidates}}}	2	Steady	14.3	2	4	10.3	4,962	21.2	+2.4
National Front	{{{candidates}}}	0	Steady	0.0	0	0	0.0	164	0.7	N/A

== Ward results ==
Incumbent councillors standing for re-election are marked with an asterisk (*). Changes in seats do not take into account by-elections or defections.

=== Aldenham East ===
Aldenham East
Party	Candidate	Votes	%	±%
Conservative	D. Nelson	1,426	86.7	–4.0
Labour	O'Donaghue	120	7.3	–2.0
Liberal	C. Mallach	98	6.0	N/A
Majority		1,306	79.4	N/A
Turnout		1,644	50.3	–3.9
Registered electors		3,270		
Conservative hold		Swing	▼1.0	

=== Brookmeadow ===
Brookmeadow
Party	Candidate	Votes	%	±%
Labour	P. Roach	1,176	80.4	+2.6
Conservative	Lockwood	287	19.6	–2.6
Majority		889	60.8	N/A
Turnout		1,463	46.3	+7.8
Registered electors		3,160		
Labour hold		Swing	▲2.6	

=== Elstree ===
Elstree
Party	Candidate	Votes	%	±%
Conservative	C. Watts*	1,385	72.4	+8.7
Labour	J. Whitby	428	22.4	+9.0
Liberal	Saunders	101	5.3	–17.6
Majority		957	50.0	N/A
Turnout		1,914	50.5	–3.1
Registered electors		3,791		
Conservative hold		Swing	▼0.2	

=== Heath North ===
Heath North
Party	Candidate	Votes	%	±%
Conservative	J. Harding*	875	63.5	+4.0
Liberal	Shone	373	27.1	–2.7
Labour	Davies	130	9.4	–1.3
Majority		502	36.4	N/A
Turnout		1,378	40.0	–5.1
Registered electors		3,441		
Conservative hold		Swing	▲3.4	

=== Heath South ===
Heath South
Party	Candidate	Votes	%	±%
Conservative	Eyre	1,232	73.0	+2.1
Liberal	Mitchell	320	19.0	–2.1
Labour	Heminsley	136	8.1	+0.1
Majority		912	54.0	N/A
Turnout		1,688	47.1	+4.7
Registered electors		3,586		
Conservative hold		Swing	▲2.1	

=== Kenilworth ===
Kenilworth
Party	Candidate	Votes	%	±%
Labour	Atkinson*	949	58.8	+2.8
Conservative	Tattersall	588	36.4	–1.7
Liberal	J. Timson	78	4.8	–1.1
Majority		361	22.4	N/A
Turnout		1,615	49.3	+2.3
Registered electors		3,273		
Labour hold		Swing	▲2.3	

=== Mill ===
Mill
Party	Candidate	Votes	%	±%
Liberal	Bran	966	56.5	+8.7
Conservative	Kirby	501	29.3	–2.9
Labour	J. Squires	243	14.2	–5.8
Majority		465	27.2	N/A
Turnout		1,710	49.7	–2.0
Registered electors		3,440		
Liberal hold		Swing	▲5.8	

=== Potters Bar Central ===
Potters Bar Central
Party	Candidate	Votes	%	±%
Conservative	I. Fielding*	880	50.3	+8.7
Liberal	Nelmes	670	38.3	–9.8
Labour	McCarthy	200	11.4	+1.1
Majority		210	12.0	N/A
Turnout		1,750	57.4	–4.5
Registered electors		3,049		
Conservative hold		Swing	▲9.3	

=== Potters Bar East ===
Potters Bar East
Party	Candidate	Votes	%	±%
Conservative	A. Brice	1,525	64.0	+3.2
Labour	Driver	543	22.8	–1.7
Liberal	King	211	8.9	–5.8
National Front	Hurst	103	4.3	N/A
Majority		982	41.2	N/A
Turnout		2,382	49.1	+3.4
Registered electors		4,849		
Conservative hold		Swing	▲2.3	

=== Potters Bar North ===
Potters Bar North
Party	Candidate	Votes	%	±%
Conservative	W. Stock*	1,412	81.2	–7.5
Liberal	P. Shannon	212	12.2	+6.8
Labour	Ford	114	6.6	+0.7
Majority		1,200	69.0	N/A
Turnout		1,738	47.1	–1.8
Registered electors		3,692		
Conservative hold		Swing	▼7.2	

=== Potters Bar South ===
Potters Bar South
Party	Candidate	Votes	%	±%
Conservative	E. Daniel	943	59.5	–0.7
Labour	B. Burness	382	24.1	–1.8
Liberal	Bentall	198	12.5	–1.4
National Front	Fenn	61	3.9	N/A
Majority		561	35.4	N/A
Turnout		1,584	51.7	+4.3
Registered electors		3,062		
Conservative hold		Swing	▼0.6	

=== St. James East ===
St. James East (2 seats due to by-election)
Party	Candidate	Votes	%	±%
Conservative	Scott*	670	46.5	+2.6
Liberal	Hillier	641	44.5	–1.1
Conservative	Topping	636	44.1	+2.2
Liberal	Hyman	613	42.5	–1.3
Labour	Wyatt	130	9.0	–1.5
Labour	Sanders	123	8.5	–0.6
Turnout		~1,442	55.2	±0.0
Registered electors		2,612		
Conservative hold				
Liberal hold				

=== St. James West ===
St. James West
Party	Candidate	Votes	%	±%
Conservative	L. Silver*	1,062	62.0	+12.3
Liberal	Eustace	481	28.1	–14.9
Labour	Pountney	170	9.9	+2.6
Majority		581	33.9	N/A
Turnout		1,713	51.1	–4.1
Registered electors		3,353		
Conservative hold		Swing	▲13.6	
