= 1986 Lewisham London Borough Council election =

1986 local election in England

Elections to Lewisham London Borough Council were held in May 1986. The whole council was up for election. Turnout was 40.7%.

== Election result ==
Lewisham local election result 1986
Party	Seats	Gains	Losses	Net gain/loss	Seats %	Votes %	Votes	+/−
Labour	50					47.3		
Conservative	17					34.3		
Alliance	0				0.0	15.7		

== Ward results ==
Bellingham (2)
Party	Candidate	Votes	%	±%

Blackheath (2)
Party	Candidate	Votes	%	±%

Blythe Hill (2)
Party	Candidate	Votes	%	±%

Catford (2)
Party	Candidate	Votes	%	±%

Churchdown (3)
Party	Candidate	Votes	%	±%
Labour	Margaret Moran	1,888		
Labour	D. McKibblin	1,749		
Labour	R. Stockbridge	1,727		
Conservative	S. Bennett	1,535		
Conservative	D. Bennett	1,522		
Conservative	A. Lee	1,505		
Alliance	J. Hurst	645		
Alliance	I. Owens	620		
Alliance	W. Everitt	613		
Total votes		7,881	54.3%	

Crofton Park (3)
Party	Candidate	Votes	%	±%

Downham (3)
Party	Candidate	Votes	%	±%
Labour	Thomas I. Bradley	1,445	50.5	
Labour	Frederick A. Barrett	1,428		
Labour	Norman Smith	1,428		
Conservative	M. Casey	946	33.1	
Conservative	Ms A. O'Donnell	942		
Conservative	Ms P. Sammons	898		
Alliance	Ms M. Drummond	470	16.4	
Alliance	H. Head	455		
Alliance	Ms A. Catley	437		
Total votes			40.4%	
Registered electors		7,828		
Labour hold		Swing		
Labour hold		Swing		
Labour hold		Swing		

Drake (3)
Party	Candidate	Votes	%	±%

Evelyn (3)
Party	Candidate	Votes	%	±%

Forest Hill (2)
Party	Candidate	Votes	%	±%

Grinling Gibbons (3)
Party	Candidate	Votes	%	±%

Grove Park (2)
Party	Candidate	Votes	%	±%

Hither Green (3)
Party	Candidate	Votes	%	±%

Horniman (3)
Party	Candidate	Votes	%	±%

Ladywell (3)
Party	Candidate	Votes	%	±%

Manor Lee (2)
Party	Candidate	Votes	%	±%

Marlowe (3)
Party	Candidate	Votes	%	±%

Pepys (3)
Party	Candidate	Votes	%	±%

Perry Hill (3)
Party	Candidate	Votes	%	±%

Rushey Green (2)
Party	Candidate	Votes	%	±%

St Andrew (2)
Party	Candidate	Votes	%	±%

St Margaret (2)
Party	Candidate	Votes	%	±%

St Mildred (3)
Party	Candidate	Votes	%	±%

Sydenham East (3)
Party	Candidate	Votes	%	±%

Sydenham West (3)
Party	Candidate	Votes	%	±%

Whitefoot (2)
Party	Candidate	Votes	%	±%
