= 1982 Central Regional Council election =

1982 Scottish local government election

← 1978	6 May 1982	1986 →

All 34 seats to Central Regional Council 18 seats needed for a majority
	First party	Second party	Third party
Party	Labour	SNP	Conservative
Last election	18 seats, 41.7%	6 seats, 35.0%	6 seats, 14.4%
Seats won	22	5	4
Seat change	▲4	▼1	▼2
Popular vote	36,153	23,215	11,357
Percentage	43.0%	27.6%	13.5%
Swing	▲1.3%	▼7.4%	▼0.9%
	Fourth party	Fifth party
Party	Independent	Alliance
Last election	2 seats, 5.1%	Did not contest
Seats won	2	1
Seat change	Steady	▲1
Popular vote	3,288	10,018
Percentage	3.9%	11.9%
Swing	▼1.2%	New

The third election to Central Regional Council was held on 6 May 1982 as part of the wider 1982 Scottish regional elections.

== Results ==
1982 Central Regional Council election result
Party	Seats	Gains	Losses	Net gain/loss	Seats %	Votes %	Votes	+/−
Labour	22			▲4	64.7	43.0	36,153	▼1.3
SNP	5			▼1	14.7	27.6	23,215	▼7.4
Conservative	4			▼2	11.8	13.5	11,357	▼0.9
Independent	2			Steady	5.9	3.9	3,288	▼1.2
Alliance	1	0	0	▲1	2.9	11.9	10,018	New
Communist	0	0	0	Steady	0.0	0.1	63	New
