= 1978 Broxbourne Borough Council election =

1978 UK local government election

The 1978 Broxbourne Council election was held to elect council members of the Broxbourne Borough Council, the local government authority of the borough of Broxbourne, Hertfordshire, England.

== Composition of expiring seats before election ==
Ward	Party	Incumbent Elected	Incumbent	Standing again?
Broxbourne	Conservative	1976	D C Smith	Yes
Bury Green	Conservative	1976	S G Johnson	Yes
Cheshunt Central	Conservative	1976	G F Batchelor	Yes
Cheshunt North	Conservative	1976	D F Poole	Yes
Flamstead End	Conservative	1976	L W Goodman	Yes
Goffs Oak	Independent	1976	D T Hickman	No (Note: Dan Hickman was elected as a Conservative in 1976.)
Hoddesdon North	Conservative	1976	R A S Kay	Yes
Hoddesdon Town	Conservative	1976	B D G Fallace	Yes
Rosedale	Labour	1976	Mark Farrington	Yes
Rye Park	Conservative	1976	A P Bridgeman	No
Theobalds	Conservative	1976	H J Collins	Yes
Waltham Cross North	Conservative	1976	N M Sanderson	No
Waltham Cross South	Labour	1976	J K Paice	Yes
Wormley & Turnford	Conservative	1976	B F Hill	Yes

== Election results ==
Broxbourne local election result 1978
Party	Seats	Gains	Losses	Net gain/loss	Seats %	Votes %	Votes	+/−
Conservative	13	2	0	+2	92.86	65.17	13,642	
Labour	1	0	1	-1	7.14	31.97	6,692	
National Front	0	0	0	0	0.00	2.16	454	
Liberal	0	0	0	0	0.00	0.70	146	
Independent	0	0	1	-1	0.00	0.00	0	

== Results summary ==
An election was held in 14 wards on 4 May 1978.

14 seats were contested at this election.

The Conservative Party made 2 gains winning Rosedale Ward from Labour and retaking Goffs Oak Ward from Councillor D T Hickman who had left the Conservative Group shortly after the 1976 election to sit as an Independent.

This was the first Broxbourne Election to see National Front candidates, who stood in 4 wards.

The new political balance of the council following this election was:

- Conservative 37 seats
- Labour 5 seats

== Ward results ==
Broxbourne Ward Result 4 May 1978
Party	Candidate	Votes	%	±%
Conservative	Don Smith	1,432	80.04	
Labour	Cherry Robbins	259	14.48	
National Front	Vera Wain	98	5.48	
Majority		1,173		
Turnout		1,789		
Conservative hold		Swing		

Bury Green Ward Result 4 May 1978
Party	Candidate	Votes	%	±%
Conservative	Sidney Johnson	946	55.84	
Labour	Chris Robbins	748	44.16	
Majority		198		
Turnout		1,694		
Conservative hold		Swing		

Cheshunt Central Ward Result 4 May 1978
Party	Candidate	Votes	%	±%
Conservative	George Batchelor	1,145	75.48	
Labour	Les Goodrum	372	24.52	
Majority		773		
Turnout		1,517		
Conservative hold		Swing		

Cheshunt North Ward Result 4 May 1978
Party	Candidate	Votes	%	±%
Conservative	Don Poole	1,149	65.51	
Labour	Deidre Welsh	605	34.49	
Majority		544		
Turnout		1,754		
Conservative hold		Swing		

Flamstead End Ward Result 4 May 1978
Party	Candidate	Votes	%	±%
Conservative	Leonard Goodman	1,132	64.65	
Labour	Pat Whitthread	486	27.76	
National Front	Frederick Venables	133	7.59	
Majority		646		
Turnout		1,751		
Conservative hold		Swing		

Goffs Oak Ward Result 4 May 1978
Party	Candidate	Votes	%	±%
Conservative	Marie Dowsett	1,181	82.99	
Labour	Roy Shaw	242	17.01	
Majority		939		
Turnout		1,423		
Conservative gain from Independent		Swing		

Hoddesdon North Ward Result 4 May 1978
Party	Candidate	Votes	%	±%
Conservative	Tony Kay	1,293	78.27	
Labour	Dave Wall	359	21.73	
Majority		934		
Turnout		1,652		
Conservative hold		Swing		

Hoddesdon Town Ward Result 4 May 1978
Party	Candidate	Votes	%	±%
Conservative	Brian Fallace	934	70.86	
Labour	Henry Lucas	384	29.14	
Majority		550		
Turnout		1,318		
Conservative hold		Swing		

Rosedale Ward Result 4 May 1978
Party	Candidate	Votes	%	±%
Conservative	Adrian Ebeling	375	46.18	
Labour	Mark Farrington	357	43.97	
National Front	Ramon Johns	80	9.85	
Majority		18		
Turnout		812		
Conservative gain from Labour		Swing		

Rye Park Ward Result 4 May 1978
Party	Candidate	Votes	%	±%
Conservative	James Grethe	960	57.87	
Labour	Mike Pye	699	42.13	
Majority		261		
Turnout		1,659		
Conservative hold		Swing		

Theobalds Ward Result 4 May 1978
Party	Candidate	Votes	%	±%
Conservative	Herbert Collins	1,012	68.24	
Labour	Doris Hadju	471	31.76	
Majority		541		
Turnout		1,483		
Conservative hold		Swing		

Waltham Cross North Ward Result 4 May 1978
Party	Candidate	Votes	%	±%
Conservative	Norman Ames	771	61.14	
Labour	Joan Carter	490	38.86	
Majority		281		
Turnout		1,261		
Conservative hold		Swing		

Waltham Cross South Ward Result 4 May 1978
Party	Candidate	Votes	%	±%
Labour	Jean Paice	896	52.40	
Conservative	Amy Testro	671	39.24	
National Front	Albert Wain	143	8.36	
Majority		225		
Turnout		1,710		
Labour hold		Swing		

Wormley / Turnford Ward Result 4 May 1978
Party	Candidate	Votes	%	±%
Conservative	Brian Hill	641	57.70	
Labour	Edward Nicholls	324	29.16	
Liberal	Barbara Wade	146	13.14	
Majority		317		
Turnout		1,111		
Conservative hold		Swing		
