= 1976 Southend-on-Sea Borough Council election =

1976 English local election

- 6 May 1976

All 39 seats to Southend-on-Sea Borough Council 20 seats needed for a majority

	First party	Second party	Third party
Party	Conservative	Liberal	Labour
Seats won	29	6	4
Seat change	▲5	▼5	▼9
Popular vote	72,235	35,285	21,982
Percentage	55.3%	27.0%	16.8%
Swing	▲7.4%	▲2.2%	▼10.5%
Council control before election
No overall control
Council control after election
Conservative

The 1976 Southend-on-Sea Borough Council election took place on 6 May 1976 to elect members of Southend-on-Sea Borough Council in Essex, England. This was on the same day as other local elections.

== Summary ==
=== Election result ===
1976 Southend-on-Sea Borough Council election
Party	Candidates	Seats	Gains	Losses	Net gain/loss	Seats %	Votes %	Votes	+/−
Conservative	37	29			▲5	74.4	55.3	72,235	+7.4
Liberal	28	6			▼5	15.4	27.0	35,285	+2.2
Labour	31	4			▼9	10.3	16.8	21,982	–10.5
Independent Labour	1	0			Steady	0.0	0.8	1,063	N/A
