= 1978 Fife Regional Council election =

1978 Scottish local government election

← 1974	2 May 1978	1982 →

All 42 seats to Fife Regional Council 22 seats needed for a majority

	First party	Second party	Third party
Party	Labour	Conservative	Independent
Last election	26	10	3
Seats won	24	14	2
Seat change	▼2	▲4	▼1
Popular vote	40,643	30,174	3,346
Percentage	44.0%	32.7%	3.6%
	Fourth party	Fifth party
Party	SNP	Communist
Last election	0	1
Seats won	1	1
Seat change	▲1	0
Popular vote	14,210	3,695
Percentage	15.4%	4.0%
Council control before election
Labour
Council control after election
Labour

The second election to Fife Regional Council was held on 2 May 1978 as part of the wider 1978 Scottish regional elections. The election saw Labour maintaining their control of the region's 42 seat council.

== Aggregate results ==
Fife Regional election, 1978 Turnout: 46.4%
Party	Seats	Gains	Losses	Net gain/loss	Seats %	Votes %	Votes	+/−
Labour	24					44.0	40,643	
Conservative	14					32.7	30,174	
Independent	2					3.6	3,346	
SNP	1					15.4	14,210	
Communist	1					4.0	3,695	
Liberal	0				0.0	0.3	292	
