= 1978 Highland Regional Council election =

1978 Scottish local government election

- 2 May 1978

All 47 seats to Highland Regional Council 24 seats needed for a majority

	First party	Second party	Third party
Party	Independent	Labour	SNP
Last election	37 seats, 72.1%	4 seats, 8.1%	1 seat, 8.9%
Seats won	37	5	2
Seat change	0	▲1	▲1
Popular vote	23,931	1,536	1,739
Percentage	83.4%	5.3%	6.1%
Swing	▲11.3%	▼2.8%	▼2.8%
	Fourth party	Fifth party
Party	Liberal	Conservative
Last election	3 seats, 9.0%	2 seats, 1.8%
Seats won	2	1
Seat change	▼1	▼1
Popular vote	747	758
Percentage	2.6%	2.6%
Swing	▼6.4%	▲0.8%
Council Convener before election
Murdo Morrison
Independent
Council Convener after election
Ian Campbell
Independent

An election to Highland Regional Council was held on 2 May 1978 as part of the wider 1978 Scottish regional elections. The election saw Independents win control of 37 of the councils 47 seats.

== Aggregate results ==
Highland Regional election, 1978 Turnout: 44.2% (▼14.0%)
Party	Seats	Gains	Losses	Net gain/loss	Seats %	Votes %	Votes	+/−
Independent	37	0	0	0	100.0	83.4	23,931	▲11.3
Labour	5	▲1				5.3	1,536	▼2.8
SNP	2	▲1				6.1	1,739	▼2.8
Liberal	2		▼1			2.6	747	▼6.4
Conservative	1		▼1			2.6	758	▲0.8
