= 1978 Central Regional Council election =

1978 Scottish local government election

← 1974	2 May 1978	1982 →

All 34 seats to Central Regional Council 18 seats needed for a majority
	First party	Second party	Third party
Party	Labour	SNP	Conservative
Last election	17 seats, 43.4%	9 seats, 34.8%	4 seats, 9.7%
Seats won	18	6	6
Seat change	▲1	▼3	▲2
Popular vote	41,941	35,137	14,464
Percentage	41.7%	35.0%	14.4%
Swing	▼1.7%	▲0.2%	▲4.7%
	Fourth party	Fifth party	Sixth party
Party	Independent	Independent Labour	Democratic Nationalist
Last election	3 seats, 10.5%	1 seat, 1.5%	Did not contest
Seats won	2	1	1
Seat change	▼1	Steady	▲1
Popular vote	5,110	2,467	1,416
Percentage	5.1%	2.5%	1.4%
Swing	▼5.4%	▲1.0%	New

The second election to Central Regional Council was held on 2 May 1978 as part of the wider 1978 Scottish regional elections.

== Results ==
1978 Central Regional Council election result
Party	Seats	Gains	Losses	Net gain/loss	Seats %	Votes %	Votes	+/−
Labour	18			▲1	52.9	41.7	41,941	▼1.7
SNP	6			▼3	17.6	35.0	35,137	▲0.2
Conservative	6			▲2	17.6	14.4	14,464	▲4.7
Independent	2			▼1	5.9	5.1	5,110	▼5.4
Independent Labour	1	0	0	Steady	2.9	2.5	2,467	▲1.0
Democratic Nationalist	1	1	0	▲1	2.9	1.4	1,416	New
