= 1978 Wolverhampton Metropolitan Borough Council election =

1978 local election in England

The 1978 Wolverhampton Metropolitan Borough Council election for the City of Wolverhampton Council was held on Thursday 4 May.

Following the elections no single party had overall control of Wolverhampton Metropolitan Borough Council, the WAR candidates voted with Labour at the mayor making a few weeks later but control passed to the Conservative group following the February 1979 Low Hill by election when the Conservatives gained a seat from Labour.

The 1978 election is notable in that two future Wolverhampton Members of Parliament, Dennis Turner (Bilston East) and Ken Purchase (Eastfield) were both elected to the council.

A vacant seat in St Peters meant two seats were contested in that ward.

The composition of the council prior to the election was:

- Labour 33
- Conservative 24
- Wolverhampton Association of Ratepayers 2
- Vacancy 1

The composition of the council following the election was:

- Labour 29
- Conservative 29
- Wolverhampton Association of Ratepayers 2

== Ward results ==
Bilston East
Party	Candidate	Votes	%	±%
Labour	D Turner	2053		
Conservative	J Boden	712		
National Front	B Hyde	142		
WAR	S Davis	64		
Majority		1341		
Labour hold		Swing		

Bilston North
Party	Candidate	Votes	%	±%
Conservative	C Barber	1518		
Labour	P Richards	1345		
National Front	G McNally	297		
Majority		73		
Conservative gain from Labour		Swing		

Blakenhall
Party	Candidate	Votes	%	±%
Conservative	J Carpenter	1896		
Labour	B Jones	1761		
Liberal	M Parsley	292		
National Front	Mrs J Johnson	346		
WAR	J Hewes	179		
Majority		137		
Conservative hold		Swing		

Bushbury
Party	Candidate	Votes	%	±%
Labour	Mrs J Beddoes	1286		
Conservative	Mrs I Bickley	807		
WAR	C J Reynolds	248		
National Front	J Robinson	153		
Majority		479		
Labour hold		Swing		

Eastfield
Party	Candidate	Votes	%	±%
Labour	K Purchase	2015		
Conservative	Mrs R Smith	929		
National Front	G Cooper	258		
Liberal	C Hallmark	171		
Majority		1086		
Labour hold		Swing		

Ettingshall
Party	Candidate	Votes	%	±%
Labour	E Bold	1292		
Conservative	H Davies	569		
National Front	P Rollason	158		
Majority		723		
Labour hold		Swing		

Graiseley
Party	Candidate	Votes	%	±%
Labour	F Ledsam	2195		
Conservative	P Smith	1253		
National Front	Mrs M Robinson	228		
Majority		942		
Labour hold		Swing		

Low Hill
Party	Candidate	Votes	%	±%
Labour	D Hickman	1362		
Conservative	Mrs J Hickman	902		
National Front	D Johnson	178		
Liberal	L Maclean	113		
Majority		460		
Labour hold		Swing		

Merry Hill
Party	Candidate	Votes	%	±%
Conservative	B Clarke	3458		
Labour	R Haynes	1284		
WAR	Mrs E M Powell	205		
National Front	B Percival	203		
Majority		2174		
Conservative hold		Swing		

Oxley
Party	Candidate	Votes	%	±%
Conservative	F Haley	1309		
WAR	R Stickland	1225		
Labour	P Bateman	1063		
National Front	Mrs C Thomas	132		
Majority		693		
Conservative gain from Labour		Swing		

Park
Party	Candidate	Votes	%	±%
Conservative	W Morrison	2044		
Labour	S Lydon	847		
Liberal	R Gray	479		
National Front	Mrs C Simpson	120		
WAR	Miss K Johnston	84		
Majority		1197		
Conservative hold		Swing		

Parkfield
Party	Candidate	Votes	%	±%
Labour	G Howells	1553		
Conservative	B Carpenter	591		
National Front	J Thomas	194		
WAR	B V Read	45		
Majority		962		
Labour hold		Swing		

Penn
Party	Candidate	Votes	%	±%
Conservative	A Bickley	3638		
Labour	J Fenby	597		
WAR	R J Thomas	228		
National Front	J Keating	163		
Majority		3041		
Conservative hold		Swing		

St Peters
Party	Candidate	Votes	%	±%
Labour	I Claymore	2424		
Labour	S S Duhra	2143		
Conservative	Mrs G Hodson	759		
Conservative	J Inglis	609		
National Front	J Bladon	154		
WAR	J Smith	120		
National Front	J Spencer	110		
Labour hold		Swing		

Spring Vale
Party	Candidate	Votes	%	±%
Labour	Mrs M Pointon	2030		
Conservative	J Lockley	1447		
Majority		583		
Labour hold		Swing		

Tettenhall Regis
Party	Candidate	Votes	%	±%
Conservative	S Morton	2807		
WAR	Mrs J Gunter	733		
Labour	M Powis	399		
National Front	Mrs M Ryan	140		
Ind. Conservative	J Cartwright	117		
Majority		2074		
Conservative hold		Swing		

Tettenhall Wightwick
Party	Candidate	Votes	%	±%
Conservative	R Watson	3177		
Labour	M Smith	685		
Liberal	Mrs S Ascott	248		
National Front	S Hammond	191		
WAR	T Rathbone	99		
Majority		1752		
Conservative hold		Swing		

Wednesfield Heath
Party	Candidate	Votes	%	±%
Conservative	W Wootton	2007		
Labour	H Turner	1219		
National Front	G Jones	246		
Majority		788		
Conservative gain from Labour		Swing		

Wednesfield North
Party	Candidate	Votes	%	±%
Conservative	G Jones	2121		
Labour	A Morey	1865		
National Front	S Mcnally	320		
Majority		256		
Conservative gain from Labour		Swing		

Wednesfield South
Party	Candidate	Votes	%	±%
Conservative	J Davis	1748		
Labour	Mrs C Nicholls	1457		
National Front	J Dutton	182		
Majority		291		
Conservative gain from Labour		Swing		
