= 1978 Tayside Regional Council election =

1978 Scottish local government election

- 2 May 1978

All 46 seats to Tayside Regional Council 24 seats needed for a majority
| | First party | Second party | Third party |
|---|---|---|---|
| Party | Conservative | Labour | Independent |
| Last election | 22 seats, 43.8% | 15 seats, 32.5% | 9 seats, 19.9% |
| Seats won | 25 | 15 | 6 |
| Seat change | ▲3 | Steady | ▼3 |
| Popular vote | 38,665 | 31,156 | 3,098 |
| Percentage | 42.7% | 34.4% | 3.4% |
| Swing | ▼1.1% | ▲1.9% | ▼16.5% |

The second election to Tayside Regional Council was held on 2 May 1978 as part of the wider 1978 Scottish regional elections. The election saw the Conservatives maintain their control of the region, gaining an absolute majority. Following the election, the Conservative former Lord Provost of Dundee, William K. Fitzgerald, became convener of the council.

== Results ==
1978 Tayside Regional Council election result
| Party | Seats | Gains | Losses | Net gain/loss | Seats % | Votes % | Votes | +/− |
|---|---|---|---|---|---|---|---|---|
| Conservative | 25 | 3 | 0 | ▲3 | 54.3 | 42.7 | 38,665 | ▼1.1 |
| Labour | 15 | 0 | 0 | Steady | 32.6 | 34.4 | 31,156 | ▲1.9 |
| Independent | 6 | 0 | 3 | ▼3 | 13.0 | 3.4 | 3,098 | ▼16.5 |
| SNP | 0 | 0 | 0 | Steady | 0.0 | 16.2 | 14,698 | New |
| Liberal | 0 | 0 | 0 | Steady | 0.0 | 1.6 | 1,404 | ▼0.1 |
| Communist | 0 | 0 | 0 | Steady | 0.0 | 0.9 | 837 | ▲0.3 |
| Independent Labour | 0 | 0 | 0 | Steady | 0.0 | 0.7 | 618 | ▲0.3 |
