= 1978 Lewisham London Borough Council election =

1978 local election in England

The 1978 Lewisham London Borough Council election for the Lewisham London Borough Council was held in May 1978. The whole council was up for election. Turnout was 38.6%.

== Election result ==
Lewisham local election result 1978
Party	Seats	Gains	Losses	Net gain/loss	Seats %	Votes %	Votes	+/−
Labour	44					49.1		
Conservative	23					44.5		
Liberal	0				0.0	1.8		

== Ward results ==
Bellingham (2)
Party	Candidate	Votes	%	±%
Labour	Ronald S J Burlison	1,911	72.3	
Labour	Roger D. Godsiff	1,727		
Conservative	Mark J. Boleat	733	27.7	
Conservative	Alistair J. Skelsey	696		
Total votes			41.6	
Registered electors		6,735		
Labour win (new seat)				

Blackheath (2)
Party	Candidate	Votes	%	±%
Labour	Geoffrey Barrass	1,065	48.2	
Labour	James P. Dowd	1,045		
Conservative	Ms Irene E. Farrell	1,021	46.2	
Conservative	Theodore E. Farrell	1,019		
Liberal	Ms Jane E. Southall	125	5.7	
Liberal	Dennis R. Staley	102		
Total votes			46.7	
Registered electors		4,982		
Labour win (new seat)				

Blythe Hill (2)
Party	Candidate	Votes	%	±%
Conservative	Ms Shirley K. Cannon	1,468	59.9	
Conservative	Richard Evans	1,456		
Labour	Ms Clara L. Cole	981	40.1	
Labour	Christopher J. Leeds	930		
Total votes			48.8	
Registered electors		5,294		
Conservative win (new seat)				

Catford (2)
Party	Candidate	Votes	%	±%
Conservative	Ms Margaret King	1,996	70.3	
Conservative	Godfrey S. Agar	1,950		
Labour	Ernest T. Trott	842	29.7	
Labour	Balachandren M. Granapragasam	777		
Total votes			48.1	
Registered electors		6,305		
Conservative win (new seat)				

Churchdown (3)
Party	Candidate	Votes	%	±%
Labour	John Charles Henry	1,880	59.4	
Labour	Ms Daisy Hurren	1,694		
Labour	James R. Hurren	1,645		
Conservative	Terence J R. Macartney	1,086	34.3	
Conservative	Christopher B. Chuter	1,044		
Conservative	Frederick J. Waghorn	1,019		
National Front	Stephen P. Greene	200	6.3	
National Front	Ms Kathleen Ubsdell	160		
National Front	Peter Ubsdell	148		
Total votes			40.3	
Registered electors		8,443		
Labour win (new seat)				

Crofton Park (3)
Party	Candidate	Votes	%	±%
Conservative	Ms G. Elvin	1,841	50.2	
Conservative	C. Nicklin	1,805		
Conservative	D. Stone	1,774		
Labour	J. Britton	1,515	41.3	
Labour	A. Patterson	1,475		
Labour	D. Waters	1,453		
Community	N. Fierz	308	8.4	
Community	Ms K. Pullinger	267		
Community	L. Kemp	240		
Total votes			44.2	
Registered electors		8,732		
Conservative win (new seat)				
Conservative win (new seat)				
Conservative win (new seat)				

Downham (3)
Party	Candidate	Votes	%	±%
Labour	Frederick A. Barrett	1,907	63.7	
Labour	Thomas I. Bradley	1,903		
Labour	Norman Smith	1,838		
Conservative	C. Aird	924	30.9	
Conservative	Ms G. Bryant	915		
Conservative	L. Hollingsworth	898		
National Front	Ms P. Burns	161	5.4	
National Front	D. Kingstree	156		
National Front	Ms M. Cole	139		
Total votes			41.1	
Registered electors		8,116		
Labour win (new seat)				

Drake (3)
Party	Candidate	Votes	%	±%
Labour	C. Cook	1,438	48.8	
Labour	J. Lynch	1,292		
Labour	S. Angrove	1,254		
Conservative		1,089	37.0	
Conservative		1,039		
Conservative		1,036		
Liberal	Roy J Boyd	231	7.8	
National Front		186	6.3	
National Front		178		
Liberal	Richard F Wilson	171		
National Front		168		
Liberal	Edel F Thompson	161		
Total votes			35.4	
Registered electors		8,668		
Labour win (new seat)				

Evelyn (3)
Party	Candidate	Votes	%	±%
Labour	W. Riddell	1,711	69.7	
Labour	P. Adams	1,683		
Labour	N. Taylor	1,648		
Conservative		389	15.9	
Conservative		385		
Conservative		372		
National Front		227	9.3	
National Front		227		
National Front		200		
Liberal	Hudson M Knight	127	5.2	
Total votes			37.5	
Registered electors		7,178		
Labour win (new seat)				

Forest Hill (2)
Party	Candidate	Votes	%	±%
Labour	Ms J. Addison	1,233	51.5	
Labour	A. Emerson	1,229		
Conservative		1,050	43.9	
Conservative		1,001		
		111	4.6	
		102		
Total votes			50.6	
Registered electors		5,040		
Labour win (new seat)				
Labour win (new seat)				

Grinling Gibbons (3)
Party	Candidate	Votes	%	±%
Labour	D. Townsend		52.5	
Labour	R. Daltrey			
Labour	M. Profitt			
Conservative			16.9	
Total votes			31.5	
Registered electors		7,572		
Labour win (new seat)				
Labour win (new seat)				
Labour win (new seat)				

Grove Park (2)
Party	Candidate	Votes	%	±%
Labour	T. Scott	1,087	50.7	
Conservative	T. Bickley	1,057	49.3	
Labour		1,034		
Conservative		1,000		
Total votes			47.7	
Registered electors		4,746		
Labour win (new seat)				
Conservative win (new seat)				

Hither Green (3)
Party	Candidate	Votes	%	±%
Labour	E. Walker		54.1	
Labour	R. Pepper			
Labour	A. Hawkins			
Conservative			40.2	
Conservative				
Conservative				
National Front			5.7	
National Front				
National Front				
Total votes			43.8	
Registered electors		8,374		
Labour win (new seat)				
Labour win (new seat)				
Labour win (new seat)				

Horniman (3)
Party	Candidate	Votes	%	±%
Conservative	N. Bennett		63.4	
Conservative	Ms L. Agar			
Conservative	K. Ferguson			
Labour			36.6	
Labour				
Labour				
Total votes			45.6	
Registered electors		8,235		
Conservative win (new seat)				
Conservative win (new seat)				
Conservative win (new seat)				

Ladywell (3)
Party	Candidate	Votes	%	±%
Labour	E. Bickley		54.9	
Labour	W. Simson			
Labour	R. White			
Conservative			45.1	
Conservative				
Conservative				
Total votes			39.8	
Registered electors		7,806		
Labour win (new seat)				
Labour win (new seat)				
Labour win (new seat)				

Manor Lee (2)
Party	Candidate	Votes	%	±%
Labour	G. James		47.2	
Labour	N. Reed			
Conservative			43.6	
Conservative				
Liberal	Timothy C Field			
Liberal	Janice I Headland			
Communist				
Total votes			51.9	
Registered electors		6,214		
Labour win (new seat)				
Labour win (new seat)				

Marlowe (3)
Party	Candidate	Votes	%	±%
Labour	E. Rowing		62.8	
Labour	R. Yeo			
Labour	T. Agambar			
Conservative			18.7	
Conservative				
Conservative				
Total votes			30.2	
Registered electors		6,910		
Labour win (new seat)				

Pepys (3)
Party	Candidate	Votes	%	±%

Perry Hill (3)
Party	Candidate	Votes	%	±%

Rushey Green (2)
Party	Candidate	Votes	%	±%

St Andrew (2)
Party	Candidate	Votes	%	±%

St Margaret (2)
Party	Candidate	Votes	%	±%

St Mildred (3)
Party	Candidate	Votes	%	±%

Sydenham East (3)
Party	Candidate	Votes	%	±%

Sydenham West (3)
Party	Candidate	Votes	%	±%

Whitefoot (2)
Party	Candidate	Votes	%	±%
