= 1978 Bolton Metropolitan Borough Council election =

1978 UK local government election

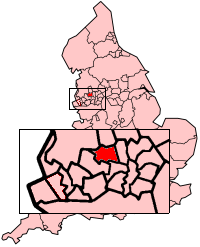
The Metropolitan Borough of Bolton shown within England.

Elections to Bolton Metropolitan Borough Council were held in May 1978. The Conservatives retained control of the council.

23 seats were contested, with 11 being won by the Conservative Party and 12 by the Labour Party.

After the election, the composition of the council was:

- Conservative 45
- Labour 23
- Liberal Party 1

== Election result ==
Bolton local election result 1978
Party	Seats	Gains	Losses	Net gain/loss	Seats %	Votes %	Votes	+/−
Conservative	11	1	2	-1		50.9	36,495	-7.0
Labour	12	4	1	+3		42.1	30,185	+5.1
Liberal	0	0	1	-1		4.7	3,401	+0.8
Other parties	0	0	1	-1		2.2	1,608	+1.1

== Ward results ==
=== Astley Bridge ward ===
Astley Bridge ward (3)
Party	Candidate	Votes	%	±%
Conservative	D Shepherd	2,685	74.0	−3.5
Labour	L Hesketh	794	21.9	−0.6
Liberal	M Powell	147	4.1	+4.1
Majority		1,891	52.1	−3.0
Turnout		3,626	37.4	−0.6
Conservative hold		Swing	Con to Lib 3.8	

=== Bradshaw North and South ward ===
Bradshaw North and South ward (3)
Party	Candidate	Votes	%	±%
Conservative	B Furlong	1,662	80.0	−5.7
Labour	L Sanderson	416	20.0	+5.7
Majority		1,246	60.0	−11.3
Turnout		2,078	31.0	−3.0
Conservative hold		Swing	Con to Labour 5.7	

=== Bradford ward ===
Bradford ward (3)
Party	Candidate	Votes	%	±%
Labour	J Foster	1,451	86.0	+17.5
Conservative	N Patel	165	9.8	−18.5
Socialist (GB)	E Murphy	71	4.2	+1.0
Majority		1,286	76.2	+36.0
Turnout		1,687	41.0	+3.3
Labour hold		Swing	Con to Labour 18.0	

=== Bromley Cross, Eagley and Egerton ward ===
Bromley Cross, Eagley and Egerton ward (3)
Party	Candidate	Votes	%	±%
Conservative	D Carr	2,567	80.0	−1.9
Labour	E McCracken	642	20.0	+1.9
Majority		1,925	60.0	−3.7
Turnout		3,209	37.1	−1.4
Conservative hold		Swing	Con to Labour 1.9	

=== Church East and North ward ===
Church East and North ward (3)
Party	Candidate	Votes	%	±%
Labour	Brian Iddon	1,461	63.8	+37.1
Conservative	F Yardley	774	33.8	−7.3
National Front	D Ashurst	56	2.4	+2.4
Majority		687	30.0	
Turnout		2,291	45.0	−3.3
Labour gain from Conservative		Swing	Con to Labour 22.2	

=== Darcy Lever cum Breightmet ward ===
Darcy Lever cum Breightmet ward (3)
Party	Candidate	Votes	%	±%
Labour	D Dingwall	2,585	50.6	+6.1
Conservative	J Whittingham	2,439	47.8	−7.7
Socialist (GB)	N Duffield	83	1.6	+1.6
Majority		146	2.8	
Turnout		5,107	37.5	−1.5
Labour hold		Swing	Con to Labour 6.9	

=== Deane cum Lostock ward ===
Deane cum Lostock ward (3)
Party	Candidate	Votes	%	±%
Conservative	D Berry	2,069	71.8	−5.9
Labour	A Moon	584	20.3	−2.0
Liberal	S Roberts	150	5.2	+5.2
National Front	L Bromilow	77	2.7	+2.7
Majority		1,485	51.6	−3.8
Turnout		2,880	38.8	−2.2
Conservative hold		Swing	Con to Lib 5.5	

=== Derby ward ===
Derby ward (3)
Party	Candidate	Votes	%	±%
Labour	G Riley	1,622	74.1	+10.3
Conservative	B Lomax	504	23.0	−13.2
Communist	Alan Johnson	63	2.9	+2.9
Majority		1,118	51.1	+23.5
Turnout		2,189	37.0	+6.0
Labour hold		Swing	Con to Labour 11.7	

=== Farnworth North ward ===
Farnworth North ward (3)
Party	Candidate	Votes	%	±%
Labour	L Cunliffe	1,500	52.5	+4.8
Conservative	D Jones	1,118	39.1	−2.1
Liberal	W Crook	238	8.3	−2.8
Majority		382	13.4	+6.9
Turnout		2,856	31.4	−0.5
Labour hold		Swing	Lib to Labour 3.8	

=== Farnworth South ward ===
Farnworth South ward (3)
Party	Candidate	Votes	%	±%
Labour	J Wild	1,540	60.3	+5.0
Conservative	E Holland	775	30.4	+9.3
Liberal	L Bale	237	9.3	−14.3
Majority		765	30.0	−1.7
Turnout		2,552	27.5	+2.2
Labour hold		Swing	Lib to Con 11.8	

=== Great Lever ward ===
Great Lever ward (3)
Party	Candidate	Votes	%	±%
Labour	M Atkinson	1,842	51.0	+11.3
Conservative	J Shore	1,772	49.0	−11.3
Majority		70	2.0	
Turnout		3,614	34.6	−1.4
Labour gain from Conservative		Swing	Con to Labour 11.3	

=== Halliwell ward ===
Halliwell ward (3)
Party	Candidate	Votes	%	±%
Labour	E Hamer	1,363	37.1	−7.3
Conservative	B Holland	1,299	35.4	−20.2
Liberal	J Fish	941	25.6	+25.6
National Front	J Bridge	71	1.9	+1.9
Majority		64	1.7	
Turnout		3,674	41.0	+9.0
Labour hold		Swing	Con to Lib 22.9	

=== Heaton ward ===
Heaton ward (3)
Party	Candidate	Votes	%	±%
Conservative	B Allanson	1,909	87.6	−2.8
Labour	L Williamson	271	12.4	+2.8
Majority		1,638	75.2	−5.6
Turnout		2,180	46.0	−1.0
Conservative hold		Swing	Con to Labour 2.8	

=== Horwich North, Central and East ward ===
Horwich North, Central and East ward (3)
Party	Candidate	Votes	%	±%
Conservative	R Parkinson	2,184	52.8	−0.1
Labour	A Oakley	1,951	47.2	+0.2
Majority		233	5.6	−0.3
Turnout		4,135	38.9	−1.2
Conservative gain from Labour		Swing	Con to Labour 0.1	

=== Horwich South and Blackrod ward ===
Horwich South and Blackrod ward (3)
Party	Candidate	Votes	%	±%
Labour	M Butterfield	1,063	37.9	−0.5
Conservative	T Mulligan	950	33.9	−27.7
Independent	L Fearnhead	791	28.2	+28.2
Majority		113	4.0	
Turnout		2,804	42.9	−5.1
Labour gain from Independent		Swing	Con to Ind 27.9	

=== Hulton and Rumworth ward ===
Hulton and Rumworth ward (3)
Party	Candidate	Votes	%	±%
Conservative	J Parkinson	1,961	50.9	−4.2
Labour	J Farmer	1,719	44.6	+8.6
National Front	J Walsh	176	4.6	−4.3
Majority		242	6.3	−12.7
Turnout		3,856	39.1	+0.7
Conservative hold		Swing	Con to Labour 6.4	

=== Kearsley ward ===
Kearsley ward (3)
Party	Candidate	Votes	%	±%
Labour	R Cornthwaite	1,597	43.0	+2.6
Liberal	J Rothwell	1,273	34.3	−3.2
Conservative	A Longmire	843	22.7	+0.6
Majority		324	8.7	+5.9
Turnout		3,713	43.3	+0.7
Labour gain from Liberal		Swing	Lib to Labour 2.9	

=== Little Lever ward ===
Little Lever ward (3)
Party	Candidate	Votes	%	±%
Conservative	K Hornby	1,976	62.9	+22.4
Labour	E Blackwell	973	31.0	−6.6
Liberal	R Richardson	192	6.1	−15.8
Majority		1,003	31.9	+29.0
Turnout		3,141	39.3	+1.3
Conservative hold		Swing	Lib to Con 19.1	

=== Smithills ward ===
Smithills ward (3)
Party	Candidate	Votes	%	±%
Conservative	D Priestley	2,510	71.2	−3.3
Labour	G Hart	794	22.5	+0.6
Liberal	F Fish	223	6.3	+6.3
Majority		1,716	48.7	−3.9
Turnout		3,527	33.1	−4.8
Conservative hold		Swing	Con to Lib 4.8	

=== Tonge ward ===
Tonge ward (3)
Party	Candidate	Votes	%	±%
Conservative	S Harrison	2,567	54.6	−2.4
Labour	K McIvor	1,970	41.9	−1.1
National Front	J Hamilton	162	3.4	+3.4
Majority		597	12.7	−1.3
Turnout		4,699	41.7	−0.3
Conservative hold		Swing	Con to NF 2.9	

=== West ward ===
West ward (3)
Party	Candidate	Votes	%	±%
Labour	R Howarth	1,710	63.8	+9.0
Conservative	M Kershaw	913	34.1	−11.1
Socialist (GB)	I Heyes	58	2.2	+2.2
Majority		797	29.7	+20.2
Turnout		2,681	34.3	+2.3
Labour hold		Swing	Con to Labour 10.0	

=== Westhoughton East and Hulton ward ===
Westhoughton East and Hulton ward (3)
Party	Candidate	Votes	%	±%
Conservative	G Smith	1,753	72.3	−2.6
Labour	P Jones	670	27.7	+2.6
Majority		1,083	44.6	−5.2
Turnout		2,423	37.8	−5.0
Conservative hold		Swing	Con to Labour 2.6	

=== Westhoughton North, Central and South ward ===
Westhoughton North, Central and South ward (3)
Party	Candidate	Votes	%	±%
Labour	W Kettle	1,667	60.2	+13.0
Conservative	A Prince	1,100	39.8	−2.2
Majority		567	20.4	+15.2
Turnout		2,767	37.4	−2.4
Labour hold		Swing	Con to Lab 7.6	
