= 1994 Fife Regional Council election =

1994 Scottish local government election

- 5 May 1994

All 46 seats to Fife Regional Council 24 seats needed for a majority
	First party	Second party	Third party
Party	Labour	Liberal Democrats	SNP
Last election	30	10	2
Seats won	28	12	4
Seat change	▼2	▲2	▲2
Popular vote	52,926	26,768	25,902
Percentage	42.7%	21.6%	20.9%
	Fourth party	Fifth party
Party	Independent	Communist (Scotland)
Last election	1	1
Seats won	1	1
Seat change	0	0
Popular vote	3,355	1,717
Percentage	2.7%	1.4%
- Results by electoral division.
Council control before election
Labour
Council control after election
Labour

The 1994 Fife Regional Council election, the sixth and final election to Fife Regional Council, was held on 5 May 1994 as part of the wider 1994 Scottish regional elections. The election saw Labour maintaining their control of the region's 46 seat council.

== Aggregate results ==
The result of the election

Fife Regional election, 1994
Party	Seats	Gains	Losses	Net gain/loss	Seats %	Votes %	Votes	+/−
Labour	28			▼2	60.9	42.7	52,926	
Liberal Democrats	12			▲2	26.1	21.6	26,768	
SNP	4			▲2	8.7	20.9	25,902	
Independent	1			0	2.2	2.7	3,355	
Communist (Scotland)	1			0	2.2	1.4	1,717	
Conservative	0	0		0	0.0	9.8	12,179	
Independent Labour	0	0		0	0.0	0.7	892	
Green	0	0		0	0.0	0.1	114	
Christian Democrat	0	0		0	0.0	0.0	32	
