= 1974 Fife Regional Council election =

1974 Scottish local government election

- 8 May 1974

All 42 seats to Fife Regional Council 22 seats needed for a majority
	First party	Second party	Third party
Party	Labour	Conservative	Independent
Seats won	26	10	3
Popular vote	40,935	28,310	7,671
Percentage	41.5%	28.7%	7.8%
	Fourth party	Fifth party
Party	Ratepayers	Communist
Seats won	2	1
Popular vote	8,256	4,749
Percentage	8.4%	4.8%
Council control after election
Labour

The first election to Fife Regional Council was held on 8 May 1974 as part of the wider 1974 Scottish regional elections. The election saw Labour winning control of the region's 42 seat council.

== Aggregate results ==
Fife Regional election, 1974 Turnout: 49.9%
Party	Seats	Gains	Losses	Net gain/loss	Seats %	Votes %	Votes	+/−
Labour	26					41.5	40,935	
Conservative	10					28.7	28,310	
Independent	3					7.8	7,671	
Ratepayers	2					8.4	8,256	
Communist	1					4.8	4,749	
SNP	0				0.0	8.5	8,377	
Liberal	0				0.0	0.3	344	
