= 1978 Lothian Regional Council election =

1978 Scottish local government election

- 2 May 1978

All 49 seats to Lothian Regional Council 25 seats needed for a majority
	First party	Second party	Third party
	Lab	Con	SNP
Party	Labour	Conservative	SNP
Last election	24 seats, 39.9%	19 seats, 34.3%	3 seats, 11.6%
Seats won	26	18	3
Seat change	▲2	▼1	Steady
Popular vote	100,455	82,841	50,692
Percentage	40.33%	33.2%	20.3%
Swing	▲0.4pp	▼1.1pp	▲8.7pp
	Fourth party	Fifth party
	Lib	Ind
Party	Liberal	Independent
Last election	1 seat, 9.0%	1 seat, 3.5%
Seats won	1	1
Seat change	Steady	Steady
Popular vote	10,601	3,709
Percentage	4.3%	1.5%
Swing	▼4.7pp	▼2.0pp
- Council composition following election

The second election to Lothian Regional Council was held on 2 May 1978 and saw Labour gaining a majority of the council's 49 seats amidst a Labour surge across Scotland. Stephen Maxwell, the SNP's vice-chairman, was a prominent victim of the Labour gains, losing his seat of Slateford/Hailes.

== Aggregate results ==
Lothian Regional election, 1978
Party	Seats	Gains	Losses	Net gain/loss	Seats %	Votes %	Votes	+/−
Labour	26				53.06	40.3	100,455	
Conservative	18				36.73	33.2	82,841	
SNP	3				6.12	20.3	50,692	
Liberal	1				2.04	4.3	10,601	
Independent	1				2.04	1.5	3,709	
Communist	0				0.00	0.4	940	

== Ward results ==
20th, Slateford/Hailes
Party	Candidate	Votes	%
Labour	J. P. Mulvey	2,272	39.23
SNP	S. Maxwell	2,134	36.84
Conservative	D. Pountain	1,386	23.93
Majority		138	2.39
Turnout		5,792	
Labour gain from SNP			
