= 1986 Fife Regional Council election =

1986 Scottish local government election

- 8 May 1986

All 46 seats to Fife Regional Council 24 seats needed for a majority
	First party	Second party	Third party
Party	Labour	Alliance	Conservative
Last election	27	4	10
Seats won	30	8	4
Seat change	▲3	▲4	▼6
Popular vote	56,383	22,075	15,063
Percentage	46.4%	18.2%	12.4%
	Fourth party	Fifth party	Sixth party
Party	SNP	Communist	Independent
Last election	1	1	2
Seats won	2	1	1
Seat change	▲1	0	▼1
Popular vote	22,369	2,210	2,003
Percentage	18.4%	1.8%	1.6%
- Results by electoral division.
Council control before election
Labour
Council control after election
Labour

The 1986 Fife Regional Council election, the fourth election to Fife Regional Council, was held on 8 May 1986 as part of the wider 1986 Scottish regional elections. The election saw Labour maintaining their control of the regions 46 seat council.

== Aggregate results ==
Fife Regional election, 1986 Turnout: 46.9%
Party	Seats	Gains	Losses	Net gain/loss	Seats %	Votes %	Votes	+/−
Labour	30			▲3	65.2	46.4	56,383	
Alliance	8			▲4	17.4	18.2	22,075	
Conservative	4			▼6	8.7	12.4	15,063	
SNP	2			▲1	4.3	18.4	22,369	
Communist	1	0	0	0	2.2	1.8	2,210	
Independent	1	0	0	0	2.2	1.6	2,003	
Independent Labour	0	0	▼1	▼1	0.0	2.4	719	
Green	0	0	0	0	0.0	0.6	671	New
