= 1990 Tayside Regional Council election =

Fifth election to Tayside Regional Council

← 1986	3 May 1990	1994 →

All 46 seats to Tayside Regional Council 24 seats needed for a majority
- Turnout: 47.8%
	First party	Second party	Third party
Party	Labour	Conservative	SNP
Last election	20 seats, 28.0%	14 seats, 29.1%	9 seats, 40.8%
Seats won	18	14	10
Seat change	▼2	Steady	▲1
Popular vote	41,418	42,869	44,175
Percentage	29.0%	29.9%	30.8%
Swing	▲1.0%	▲0.8%	▼10.0%
	Fourth party	Fifth party	Sixth party
Party	Liberal Democrats	Independent Labour	Independent
Last election	1 seat, 2.1%	Did not contest	2 seats, 4.3%
Seats won	2	1	1
Seat change	▲1	▲1	▼1
Popular vote	8,500	2,143	1,790
Percentage	5.9%	1.6%	1.3%
Swing	▲3.7%	New	▼3.0%
- Interactive map of results in the 46 Tayside electoral divisions
Council control before election
No overall control
Council control after election
No overall control

The fifth election to Tayside Regional Council was held on 3 May 1990 as part of the wider 1990 Scottish regional elections and British local elections. The election saw the council remain under no overall control, with Labour keeping their position as the single largest party on the 46 seat council.

== Results ==
1990 Tayside Regional Council election
Party	Votes	%	+/–	Seats	+/–
Labour	41,458	28.91	▼0.8	18	▼2
Conservative	42,869	29.89	▲1.5	14	0
SNP	44,175	30.80	▲3.0	10	▲1
Liberal Democrats	8,500	5.93	▲4.8	2	▲1
Independent Labour	2,143	1.49	New	1	▲1
Independent	1,790	1.25	▼1.4	1	▼1
Green	2,401	1.67	▲1.4	0	0
Others	89	0.06	Steady	0	0
Total	143,425	100.00	–	46	–
Registered voters/turnout	300,996	47.8			
Source: Elections Centre

== Ward results ==
1990 Tayside Regional Council election
Ward		Councillor	Result
1	Aberbrothock	A. W. Shand	SNP hold
2	Arbroath Elliot	R. B. Speirs	Liberal Democrats gain from SNP
3	Arbroath St Vigeans	R. Hall	SNP hold
4	Carnoustie	J. Gray	Conservative gain from SNP
5	Forfar East/Dunnichen	R. G. S. McFarlane	SNP hold
6	Montrose Northesk	W. Johnston	Conservative hold
7	Kirriemuir/The Glens	H. S. Arburthnott	Conservative gain from Independent
8	Forfar West/Strathmore	F. E. Duncan	SNP hold
9	Montrose Lunan	W. A. West	SNP hold
10	Brechin	G. P. Allan	SNP hold
11	Wellgate/Baxter Park	D. Dingwall	Labour hold
12	Craigiebank	J. Glover	Labour hold
13	West Ferry/Broughty Ferry	J. C. Cathro	Conservative gain from SNP
14	Balgillo/Eastern	B. D. Mackie	Conservative hold
15	Douglas/Drumgeith	J. M. Mudie	Labour hold
16	Whitfield/Longhaugh	R. A. Mennie	Labour hold
17	Fintry	H. Connolly	Labour hold
18	Caird/Midmill	M. Barr	Labour hold
19	Clepington/Maryfield	M. J. Rolfe	Labour hold
20	Coldside/Hilltown	J. Barton	Labour hold
21	Central/Riverside	S. R. Butcher	Labour gain from Conservative
22	Dudhope/Logie	J. D. Kemp	Labour hold
23	Law/Ancrum	M. K. Vannet	Labour hold
24	Menziehill/Ninewells	W. Derby	Labour hold
25	Gourdie/Pitalpin	W. Derby	Labour hold
26	Lochee	G. W. Buckman	Labour hold
27	Rockwell/Fairmuir	E. Paterson	Labour hold
28	Trottick/Gillburn	W. Barr	Labour hold
29	Downfield/St Mary's	I. Borthwick	Independent Labour gain from Labour
30	Ardler/Blackshade	G. C. Wood	Labour hold
31	Monifieth	D. F. L. Patullo	Conservative hold
32	Longforgan/Sidlaw	A. H. Brown	Conservative hold
33	Inveralmond	R. Lumsden	SNP gain from Labour
34	Moncreiffe	M. H. Lennie	Labour hold
35	St Johnstoun	J. Doig	Independent hold
36	Viewlands	J. Whittet	Liberal Democrats hold
37	Letham	P. Fairley	SNP gain from Labour
38	Atholl/Breadalbane etc.	J. Culliven	SNP gain from Conservative
39	Strathardle	A. Powrie	Conservative hold
40	Strathisla	J. A. Riddell-Webster	Conservative hold
41	Strathearn	R. E. Buchan	Conservative hold
42	Tullibardine	J. A. O. Forsyth	Conservative hold
43	Strathtay	R. A. Puller	Conservative hold
44	St Martins	J. E. Mathers	Conservative hold
45	Gowrie	P. McCormack	Conservative hold
46	Kinross	L. Graham	SNP gain from Conservative
