= 2014 Cowdenbeath by-election =

- 23 January 2014

Cowdenbeath constituency
- Turnout: 38.4% (▼8.5 pp)
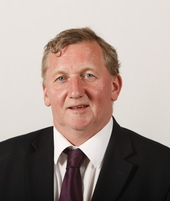

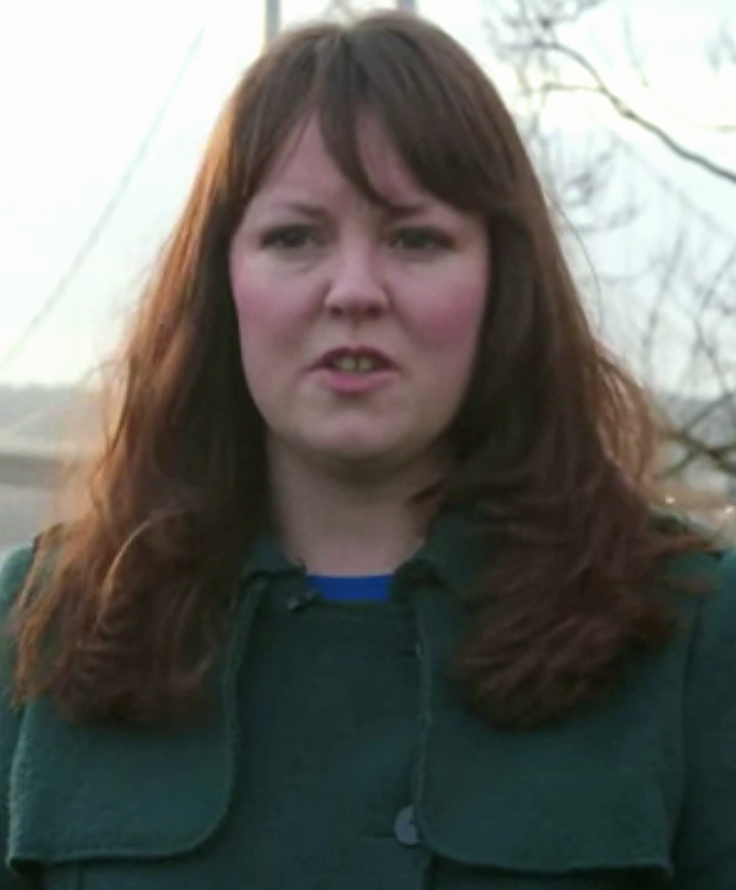
	First party	Second party	Third party
Candidate	Alex Rowley	Natalie McGarry	Dave Dempsey
Party	Labour	SNP	Conservative
Popular vote	11,192	5,704	1,893
Percentage	55.8%	28.4%	9.4%
Swing	▲9.3 pp	▼13.2 pp	▲2.4 pp
MSP before election
Helen Eadie
Labour
Elected MSP
Alex Rowley
Labour

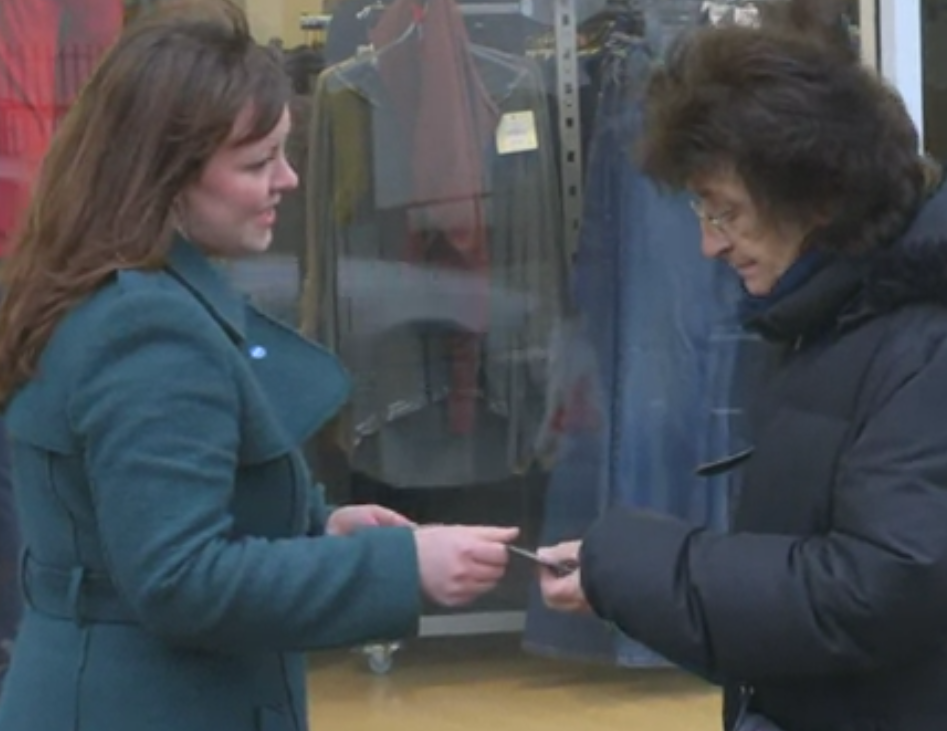
SNP candidate Natalie McGarry (left) introduces herself to a constituent whilst campaigning

The 2014 Cowdenbeath by-election was a by-election held for the Scottish Parliament constituency of Cowdenbeath on 23 January 2014.

== Background ==
The by-election was held following the death of the constituency's MSP, Helen Eadie, who had been diagnosed with cancer the previous year.

Eadie had represented Cowdenbeath since the first election to the Scottish Parliament in 1999, making her one of the few MSPs to have served in the Scottish Parliament continuously since its inception. Prior to the 2011 election the seat was known as Dunfermline East. In the 2011 election Eadie held the seat with 46.5% of the vote and a majority of 1,247 votes (4.9%) over the second placed Scottish National Party candidate.

== Result ==
In the by-election, the seat was held by Labour candidate Alex Rowley, increasing Labour's vote share to 55.8% and majority to 27.4% over SNP candidate Natalie McGarry, with an 11.25% swing.

2014 Cowdenbeath by-election
Party	Candidate	Votes	%	±%
Labour	Alex Rowley	11,192	55.8	+9.3
SNP	Natalie McGarry	5,704	28.4	−13.2
Conservative	Dave Dempsey	1,893	9.4	+2.4
UKIP	Denise Baykal	610	3.04	New
Liberal Democrats	Jade Holden	425	2.1	−1.8
The Victims Final Right	Stuart Graham	187	0.93	New
SDA	James Trolland	51	0.25	New
Majority		5,488	27.4	+22.5
Turnout		20,062	38.4	−8.5
Labour hold		Swing	+11.25	

== Previous result ==
2011 Scottish Parliament election: Cowdenbeath
Party	Candidate	Votes	%
Labour	Helen Eadie	11,926	46.5
SNP	Ian Chisholm	10,679	41.6
Conservative	Belinda Don	1,792	7.0
Liberal Democrats	Keith Legg	997	3.9
Land Party	Mick Heenan	276	1.1
Majority		1,247	4.9
Turnout		25,670	46.9
Labour win (new seat)			

== 2016 Scottish Parliament election ==
Despite Labour's by-election success, in the subsequent 2016 Scottish Parliament election, Annabelle Ewing gained the constituency for the SNP, although Rowley was re-elected to the Scottish Parliament as an additional member for the Mid Scotland Fife region.

2016 Scottish Parliament election: Cowdenbeath
Party	Candidate	Votes	%	±%
SNP	Annabelle Ewing	13,715	46.1	+4.5
Labour	Alex Rowley	10,674	35.7	−10.8
Conservative	Dave Dempsey	4,251	14.2	+7.2
Liberal Democrats	Bryn Jones	1,094	3.7	−0.2
Majority		3,041	10.4	N/A
Turnout		29,857	54.7	+7.8
SNP gain from Labour		Swing	+7.65	

== See also ==
- Cowdenbeath, and its predecessor, Dunfermline East
- Elections in Scotland
- List of by-elections to the Scottish Parliament
