= 1994 Tayside Regional Council election =

Sixth election to Tayside Regional Council

← 1990	5 May 1994

All 46 seats to Tayside Regional Council 24 seats needed for a majority
- Turnout: 45.5% ▼2.3%
	First party	Second party	Third party
Party	SNP	Labour	Conservative
Last election	10	18	14
Seats won	22	16	4
Seat change	▲12	▼2	▼10
Popular vote	54,640	35,561	28,869
Percentage	39.6%	25.7%	20.9%
	Fourth party	Fifth party	Sixth party
Party	Liberal Democrats	Independent	Independent Labour
Last election	2	1	1
Seats won	2	1	1
Seat change	0	0	0
Popular vote	13,026	2,386	2,021
Percentage	9.4%	1.7%	1.6%
- Interactive map of results in the 46 Tayside electoral divisions
Council control before election
No overall control
Council control after election
No overall control

The sixth and last election to Tayside Regional Council was held on 5 May 1994 as part of the wider 1994 Scottish regional elections. The election saw the Scottish National Party overtaking Labour to become the council's largest party, and following the election the SNP formed a minority administration. The Conservatives lost 10 seats and became the third largest party. 8 weeks later, leader of the council Lena Graham resigned 'for personal reasons' and Ewan Dow took over as council leader.

== Background ==
The Local Government (Scotland) Act 1973 created a two-tier system of local government in Scotland. Tayside was one of 9 regions, below which were 3 districts; Dundee, Angus and Perth and Kinross. The region was governed by Tayside Regional Council, whose 46 councillors were elected every 4 years using the first past the post voting system. The previous election was held on 3 May 1990, and ended in victory for Labour who took 18 seats. The Conservatives came second with 14 seats, and the SNP finished third with 10.

The SNP stood on a platform of anti-privatisation, campaigning against the Conservative government's attempts to privatise the water and sewerage systems. A total of 160 candidates stood for 46 seats; 40 women and 120 men. The SNP stood in the most electoral divisions (45), followed by the Conservatives (41), Labour (36), the Liberal Democrats (25) and the Scottish Greens (8). Two Liberal Democrat candidates were disqualified before the election after it transpired that their proposers had already nominated other individuals.

== Aftermath ==
The election ended with the SNP as the largest party, gaining 12 seats, although they were short of an overall majority. Labour took legal action after the SNP won Whitfield by just 1 vote, alleging that a spoiled ballot paper was counted in the SNP candidate's favour. The challenge was dropped after the Labour candidate George Barr was allowed to examine the contentious ballot paper.

Some Labour councillors backed nominating candidates to convenerships, knowing that they could only be elected with Conservative support. This was condemned by Scottish Labour's general secretary Jack McConnell, who told the councillors that "no Labour administration worth its salt would get the support of the Tories". Conservative group leader Bruce Mackie denied such a move, saying "There is no question at all of us working in any alliance with any other party." The SNP eventually formed a minority administration, with former group leader Frances Duncan elected convener and Lena Graham elected as council leader.

Graham resigned just 8 weeks into the role, and was replaced by Ewan Dow, a newly elected councillor. Dow was just 22 years old when he was appointed, making him the youngest Scottish council leader in history.

== Aggregate results ==
1994 Tayside Regional Council election
Party	Votes	%	+/–	Seats	+/–
SNP	54,640	39.58	▲8.8	22	▲12
Labour	35,561	25.76	▼3.2	16	▼2
Conservative	28,869	20.91	▼9.0	4	▼10
Liberal Democrats	13,026	9.44	▲3.5	2	0
Independent	2,386	1.73	▲0.5	1	0
Independent Labour	2,143	1.55	▲0.1	1	0
Scottish Green	907	0.66	▼1.0	0	0
Others	518	0.38	▲0.3	0	0
Total	138,050	100.00	–	46	–
Registered voters/turnout	306,292	45.5			
Source: Elections Centre

== Ward results ==
Each of the 46 electoral divisions elected one councillor. Boundaries were changed since the last election after a review by the Local Government Boundary Commission for Scotland.

=== Angus ===
1. Arbroath Central
Party	Candidate	Votes	%
SNP	A. King	1,440	48.7
Liberal Democrats	R. B. Spears	1,218	41.2
Conservative	R. Irvine	296	48.7
Majority		222	
Turnout			45.5
SNP win (new seat)			

2. Carnoustie East/Arbroath West
Party	Candidate	Votes	%
SNP	G. A. Lamont	1,103	31.2
Liberal Democrats	G. Ryalls	937	26.5
Conservative	J. A. McAdam	835	23.6
Labour	P. A. Wardlaw	325	9.2
Majority		166	
Turnout			52.3
SNP win (new seat)			

3. Arbroath North/Central Angus
Party	Candidate	Votes	%
SNP	H. M. W. Angus	1,423	50.2
Conservative	E. C. Hill	700	24.7
Labour	J. Warren	346	12.2
Liberal Democrats	H. O'F. Will	289	10.2
Scottish Green	P. C. Roberts	74	2.6
Majority		723	
Turnout			43.5%
SNP win (new seat)			

4. Arbroath East
Party	Candidate	Votes	%
SNP	A. W. Shand	1,791	48.8
Labour	F. G. Pearson	792	21.6
Conservative	R. D. Ramsay	292	7.9
Majority		999	
Turnout			51.9
SNP win (new seat)			

5. Carnoustie West
Party	Candidate	Votes	%
SNP	R. Lamont	1,329	41.1
Conservative	J. Gray	759	25.1
Labour	P. A. Murphy	727	24.1
Liberal Democrats	G. McBeth	198	6.5
Majority		570	
Turnout			45.9
SNP win (new seat)			

6. Forfar West
Party	Candidate	Votes	%
SNP	F. E. Duncan	2,067	67.5
Conservative	B. J. T. Townsend	642	21.1
Labour	L. Hood	345	11.2
Majority		1421	
Turnout			43.7
SNP win (new seat)			

7. Forfar East
Party	Candidate	Votes	%
SNP	I. S. Hudghton	1,883	63.1
Conservative	A. A. A. Cochrane-Dyet	523	17.5
Liberal Democrats	H. C. Fleming	289	9.6
Labour	G. MacDonald	289	9.6
Majority		1,360	
Turnout			42.0
SNP win (new seat)			

8. Montrose South
Party	Candidate	Votes	%
SNP	W. A. West	1,435	59.1
Conservative	D. J. Stubbs	579	23.8
Labour	S. Singh	248	10.2
Liberal Democrats	A. W. Warren	165	3.8
Majority		856	
Turnout			38.7
SNP win (new seat)			

9. Montrose North
Party	Candidate	Votes	%
SNP	D. C. Doward	1,460	49.8
Conservative	W. Johnston	897	30.6
Labour	J. Stewart	571	19.5
Majority		563	
Turnout			43.3
SNP win (new seat)			

10. Kirriemuir/Western Glens
Party	Candidate	Votes	%
Conservative	H. S. Arbuthnott	1,415	44.9
SNP	R. Berrie	1,347	42.8
Labour	D. K. Todd	384	12.2
Majority		68	
Turnout			44.7
Conservative win (new seat)			

11. Brechin/Eastern Glens
Party	Candidate	Votes	%
SNP	G. P. Allan	2,061	56.6
Conservative	R. J. L. Melville	971	26.6
Labour	I. A. McFatridge	431	11.8
Liberal Democrats	M. I. Gillespie	175	4.8
Majority		1090	
Turnout			49.9
SNP win (new seat)			

=== City of Dundee ===
12. Central
Party	Candidate	Votes	%
Labour	J. D. Kemp	1,031	47.8
SNP	D. C. L. Blake	478	23.6
Liberal Democrats	D. A. Stansfield	316	14.9
Conservative	J. C. W. Justice	189	8.9
Scottish Green	F. Conacher	99	4.6
Majority		553	
Turnout			30.1
Labour win (new seat)			

13. Riverside
Party	Candidate	Votes	%
Conservative	N. I. C. Powrie	1,429	42.1
Labour	S. R. Butcher	1,206	35.6
SNP	C. Cashley	423	12.4
Liberal Democrats	D. R. MacDonald	260	7.6
Scottish Green	E. C. Hood	72	2.0
Majority		223	
Turnout			50.2
Conservative win (new seat)			

14. Lochee
Party	Candidate	Votes	%
Labour	G. W. Buckman	1,767	60.6
SNP	N. Maiden	622	21.3
Conservative	A. G. L. Powrie	297	10.1
Liberal Democrats	R. J. Coates	141	4.8
Scottish Green	C. J. S. Cassells	87	2.9
Majority		1,145	
Turnout			44.9
Labour win (new seat)			

15. Law
Party	Candidate	Votes	%
Labour	B. Paterson	1,637	54.7
SNP	P. L. Mulheron	755	25.2
Conservative	W. C. Blackwood	365	12.2
Liberal Democrats	S. M. Tennant	153	5.1
Scottish Green	S. M. Hendry	82	2.7
Majority		882	
Turnout			44.4
Labour win (new seat)			

16. Dens
Party	Candidate	Votes	%
Labour	J. C. McGovern	1,546	60.4
SNP	E. Black	650	25.4
Conservative	D. E. Hay	176	6.8
Scottish Militant Labour	P. H. Manley	154	6.0
Communist	T. D. Burn	30	1.1
Majority		869	
Turnout			35.2
Labour win (new seat)			

17. Stannergate
Party	Candidate	Votes	%
Labour	D. Macmillan	1,413	39.1
SNP	J. Corrigan	1,082	30.0
Conservative	P. D. Scott	935	25.9
Liberal Democrats	E. A. Dwyer	177	4.9
Majority		331	
Turnout			53.9
Labour win (new seat)			

18. Ninewells
Party	Candidate	Votes	%
Labour	W. Derby	1,693	58.2
SNP	M. T. B. Anderson	700	24.0
Conservative	J. N. Gowans	294	10.1
Liberal Democrats	G. Cowie	222	7.6
Majority		993	
Turnout			46.7
Labour win (new seat)			

19. Charleston
Party	Candidate	Votes	%
Labour	J. R. Letford	1,834	61.8
SNP	D. Cashley	994	33.5
Liberal Democrats	C. Newell	139	4.6
Majority		840	
Turnout			45.4
Labour win (new seat)			

20. Kingsway West
Party	Candidate	Votes	%
Labour	G. C. Hood	1,113	50.3
SNP	M. Lennie	497	22.5
Scottish Militant Labour	B. Wallace	334	15.1
Liberal Democrats	I. K. Ridley	265	12.0
Majority		686	
Turnout			38.2
Labour win (new seat)			

21. St. Mary's
Party	Candidate	Votes	%
Independent Labour	I. Borthwick	2,021	61.1
Labour	W. Wright	831	21.3
SNP	E. S. Scott	454	13.7
Majority		1,190	
Turnout			50.6
Independent Labour win (new seat)			

22. Kirkton
Party	Candidate	Votes	%
Labour	W. Barr	1,529	57.9
SNP	N. Maiden	1,108	42.0
Majority		421	
Turnout			41.5
Labour win (new seat)			

23. Clepington
Party	Candidate	Votes	%
Labour	M. J. Rolfe	1,886	57.6
SNP	D. McGovern	732	22.3
Conservative	D. J. Searle	468	14.2
Liberal Democrats	J. M. Mainland	188	5.7
Majority		1,154	
Turnout			47.6
Labour win (new seat)			

24. Kingsway East
Party	Candidate	Votes	%
Labour	M. Barr	1,239	50.4
SNP	A. A. Petrie	775	31.5
Conservative	S. McQuire	387	15.7
Scottish Green	D. M. McCabe	55	2.2
Majority		464	
Turnout			38.7
Labour win (new seat)			

25. Fintry
Party	Candidate	Votes	%
Labour	H. Connolly	2,028	69.3
SNP	K. Young	808	27.6
Conservative	D. Kinnear	88	3.0
Majority		1,220	
Turnout			43.9
Labour win (new seat)			

26. Whitfield
Party	Candidate	Votes	%
SNP	J. C. Duthie	895	46.0
Labour	G. Barr	894	45.9
Liberal Democrats	D. T. Dargie	58	2.9
Conservative	J. D. Mackie	40	2.0
Majority		1	
Turnout			36.7
SNP win (new seat)			

27. Douglas and Angus
Party	Candidate	Votes	%
Labour	J. Mudie	1,950	66.3
SNP	F. Carlin	842	28.6
Conservative	E. T. Hay	146	4.9
Majority		1,108	
Turnout			44.5
Labour win (new seat)			

28. Broughty Ferry
Party	Candidate	Votes	%
Conservative	J. C. Cathro	1,266	35.8
SNP	K. J. N. Guild	1,157	32.7
Labour	I. Birnie	881	24.9
Liberal Democrats	R. B. Johnston	229	6.4
Majority		109	
Turnout			50.8
Conservative win (new seat)			

29. Barnhill
Party	Candidate	Votes	%
Conservative	B.D. Mackie	1,265	37.9
SNP	A. J. Lawrence	942	28.8
Liberal Democrats	A. Best	611	18.3
Labour	G. Cruickshank	517	15.5
Majority		323	
Turnout			49.9
Conservative win (new seat)			

30. Monifieth
Party	Candidate	Votes	%
SNP	R. J. Murray	1,655	52.0
Conservative	D. McNaughton	1,052	33.1
Labour	A. R. Butler	470	14.7
Majority		603	
Turnout			46.4
SNP win (new seat)			

31. Sidlaw
Party	Candidate	Votes	%
SNP	F. Ellis	1,668	52.0
Conservative	A. H. Brown	1,397	37.6
Labour	G. J. Martin	458	12.3
Scottish Green	S. E. Baird	186	5.0
Majority		271	
Turnout			53.1
SNP win (new seat)			

=== Perth and Kinross ===
32. Perth St. Johnstoun
Party	Candidate	Votes	%
Independent	J. Doig	1,704	65.6
Conservative	J. McNicol	637	24.5
Scottish Green	P. F. Cheer	254	9.1
Majority		1,067	
Turnout			38.0
Independent win (new seat)			

33. Perth Moncrieffe
Party	Candidate	Votes	%
Labour	M. H. Lennie	1,327	44.4
SNP	N. M. Sime	943	31.5
Conservative	L. Hurrell	442	14.7
Liberal Democrats	G. Syme	227	9.2
Majority		384	
Turnout			44.1
Labour win (new seat)			

34. Perth Viewlands
Party	Candidate	Votes	%
Liberal Democrats	L. Caddell	2,250	63.2
Conservative	I. Spresser	739	20.7
SNP	E. C. MacLachlan	566	15.9
Majority		1,511	
Turnout			50.8
Liberal Democrats win (new seat)			

35. Perth Letham
Party	Candidate	Votes	%
Labour	C. Gillies	1,338	48.1
SNP	C. M. Davidson	1,190	42.8
Conservative	R. Fraser	252	9.0
Majority		148	
Turnout			43.4
Labour win (new seat)			

36. Perth Inveralmond
Party	Candidate	Votes	%
Labour	M. O'Malley	1,508	61.9
SNP	J. Duthie	824	33.8
Conservative	M. Doyle	104	4.2
Majority		684	
Turnout			39.2
Labour win (new seat)			

37. Bridge of Earn/The Carse
Party	Candidate	Votes	%
SNP	E. G. Dow	1,990	61.5
Conservative	P. McCormack	1,242	38.4
Majority		384	
Turnout			44.1
SNP win (new seat)			

38. Glenfarg/Methven Etc.
Party	Candidate	Votes	%
SNP	J. G. K. Russell	1,113	44.2
Independent	E. V. Pentland	682	22.3
Conservative	A. J. Stewart	677	22.1
Liberal Democrats	A. Pearson	580	18.0
Majority		430	
Turnout			47.7
SNP win (new seat)			

39. Auchterarder
Party	Candidate	Votes	%
SNP	J. McLaclan	1,510	55.4
Conservative	J. A. O. Fordyce	1,215	44.5
Majority		295	
Turnout			45.3
SNP win (new seat)			

40. Crieff
Party	Candidate	Votes	%
SNP	A. M. Smith	1,620	53.8
Conservative	R. E. Buchan	1,391	46.2
Majority		229	
Turnout			43.8
SNP win (new seat)			

41. Pitlochry/Aberfeldy Etc.
Party	Candidate	Votes	%
SNP	J. Cullivan	2,112	59.2
Liberal Democrats	J. C. F. Cameron	1,454	40.7
Majority		658	
Turnout			50.3
SNP win (new seat)			

42. Dunkeld/Strathtay
Party	Candidate	Votes	%
Liberal Democrats	R. A. Scott	1,618	51.9
SNP	J. Mackay	977	31.3
Conservative	C. Cormack	521	16.7
Majority		341	
Turnout			53.4
Liberal Democrats win (new seat)			

43. Blairgowrie/Glenshee
Party	Candidate	Votes	%
SNP	J. L. Wilson	1,842	55.3
Conservative	J. Mackay	985	29.6
Labour	R. Sweeney	500	15.0
Majority		857	
Turnout			47.9
SNP win (new seat)			

44. Alyth/Coupar Angus
Party	Candidate	Votes	%
SNP	A. D. Grant	1,526	51.1
Conservative	J. Main	1,201	40.2
Labour	K. Wallace	254	8.5
Majority		325	
Turnout			48.8
SNP win (new seat)			

45. Scone and St. Martin's
Party	Candidate	Votes	%
SNP	J. E. Lloyd	1,251	38.0
Conservative	W. S. Courts	958	29.4
Liberal Democrats	B. T. J. Gourdie	817	24.8
Majority		283	
Turnout			42.0
SNP win (new seat)			

46. Kinross
Party	Candidate	Votes	%
SNP	L. Graham	2,601	76.8
Conservative	A. I. Campbell	785	23.1
Majority		1816	
Turnout			45.5
SNP win (new seat)			
