= Cowdenbeath (Scottish Parliament constituency) =

Constituency of the Scottish Parliament

- County constituency for the Scottish Parliament
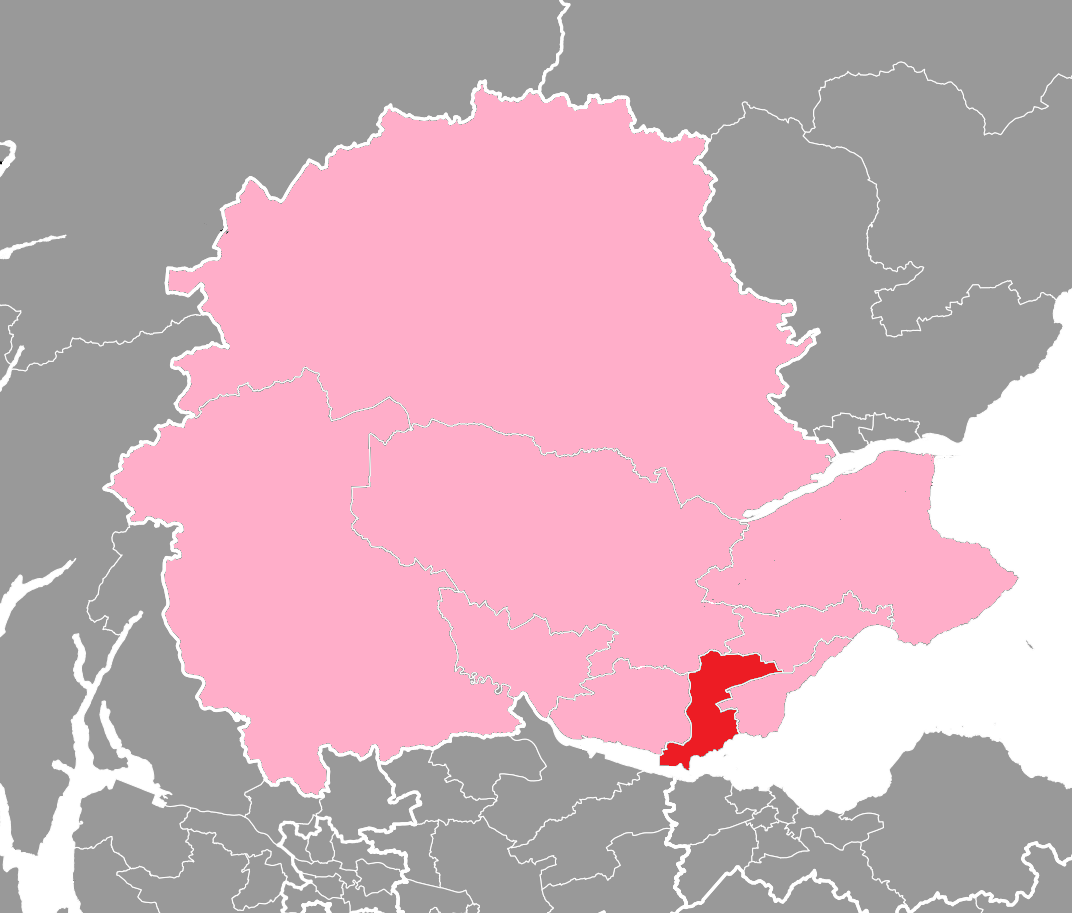

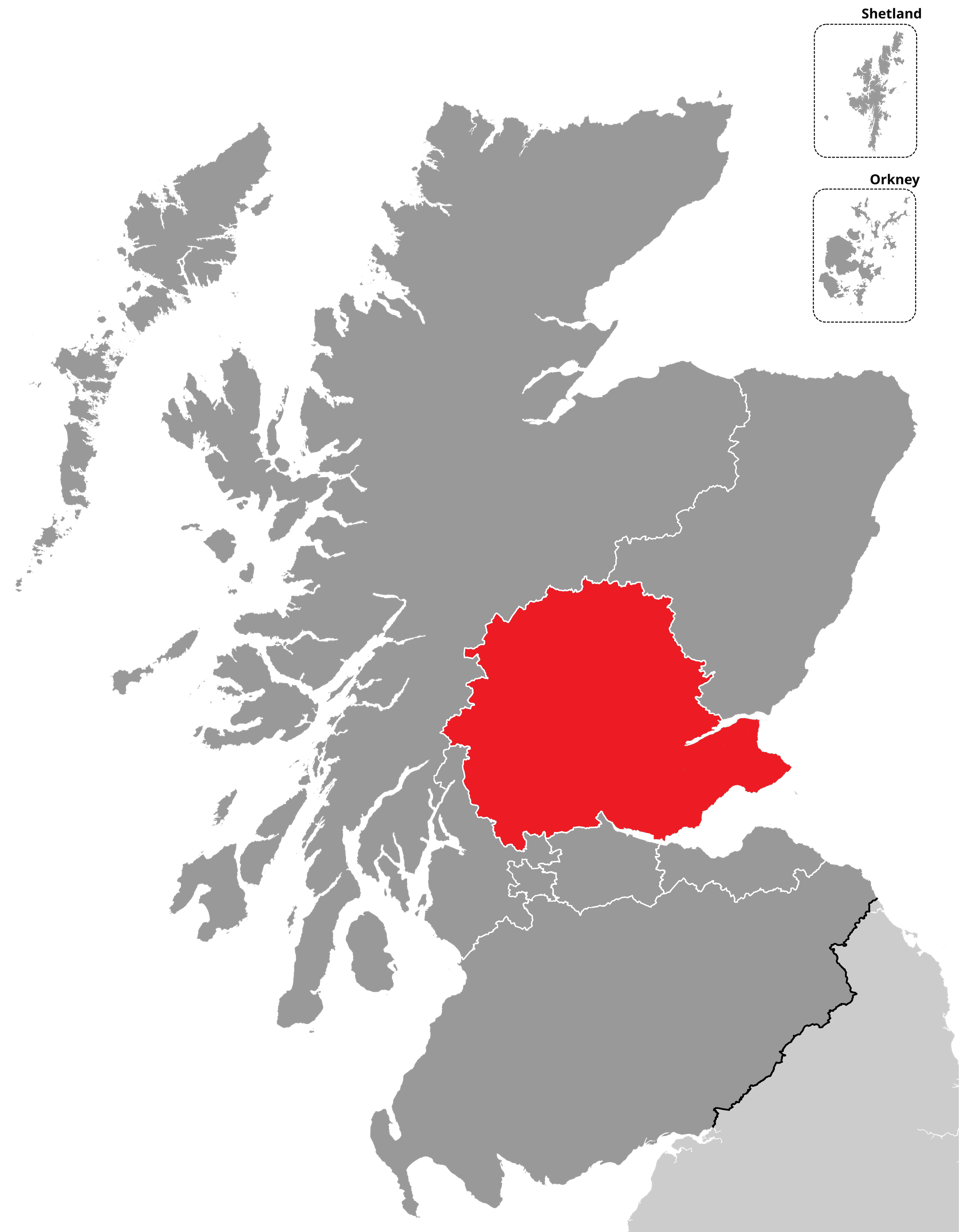
- Cowdenbeath shown within the Mid Scotland and Fife electoral region and the region shown within Scotland
- Electoral region: Mid Scotland and Fife
- Electorate: 57,226 (2026)

Current constituency
- Created: 2011
- Party: Scottish National Party
- MSP: David Barratt
- Council area: Fife

Cowdenbeath is a county constituency of the Scottish Parliament covering part of the council area of Fife. It elects one Member of the Scottish Parliament (MSP) by the first past the post method of election. Under the additional-member electoral system used for elections to the Scottish Parliament, it is also one of nine constituencies in the Mid Scotland and Fife electoral region, which elects seven additional members, in addition to the nine constituency MSPs, to produce a form of proportional representation for the region as a whole. The town of Cowdenbeath was formerly part of the Dunfermline East constituency which was abolished by the first periodic review of Scottish Parliament boundaries 2011.

The current Member is David Barratt of the Scottish National Party, elected in 2026.

== Electoral region ==
The other eight constituencies of the Mid Scotland and Fife region are: Clackmannanshire and Dunblane, Dunfermline, Kirkcaldy, Mid Fife and Glenrothes, Fife North East , Perthshire North, Perthshire South and Kinross-shire and Stirling. The region covers all of the Clackmannanshire council area, all of the Fife council area, all of the Perth and Kinross council area and all of the Stirling council area.

== Constituency boundaries and council area ==
Map of boundaries (2011-2025)

Fife is represented in the Scottish Parliament by five constituencies: Cowdenbeath, Dunfermline, Kirkcaldy, Mid Fife and Glenrothes, and Fife North East.

The constituency of Cowdenbeath was created by the first periodic review of Scottish Parliament boundaries ahead of the 2011 Scottish Parliament election from the following electoral wards of Fife Council:

- In full:
  - Inverkeithing and Dalgety Bay
  - Cowdenbeath
  - Lochgelly, Cardenden and Benarty
- In part:
  - Rosyth (shared with Dunfermline)

At the second periodic review of Scottish Parliament boundaries in 2025 the seat boundaries were very slightly altered by a minor change of the boundary with the Dunfermline constituency in order to match ward boundaries (no electors were affected by this boundary change).

== Member of the Scottish Parliament ==
Election	Member	Party
2011	Helen Eadie	Labour
2014	Alex Rowley	Labour
2016	Annabelle Ewing	SNP
2026	David Barratt	SNP

== Election results ==
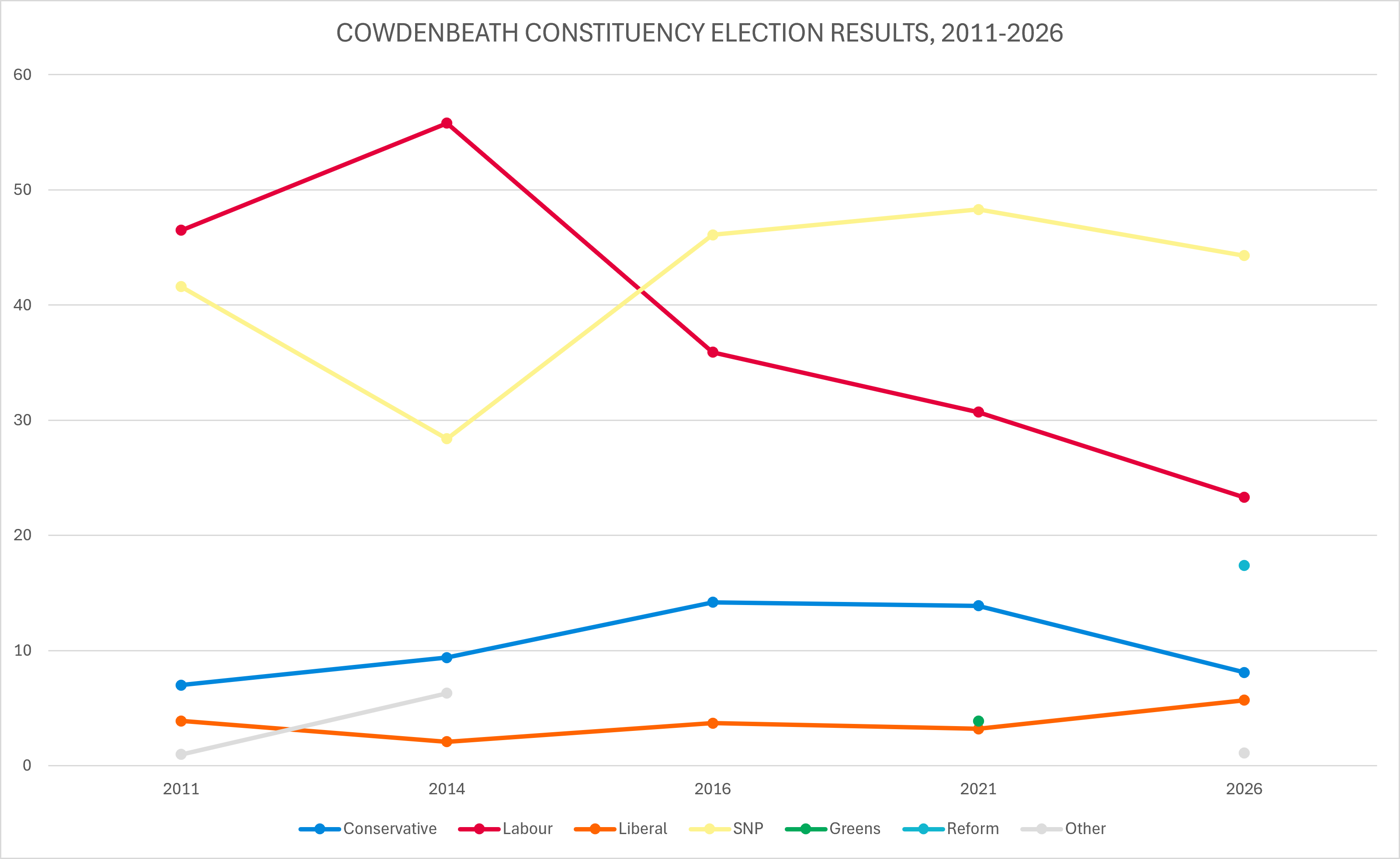
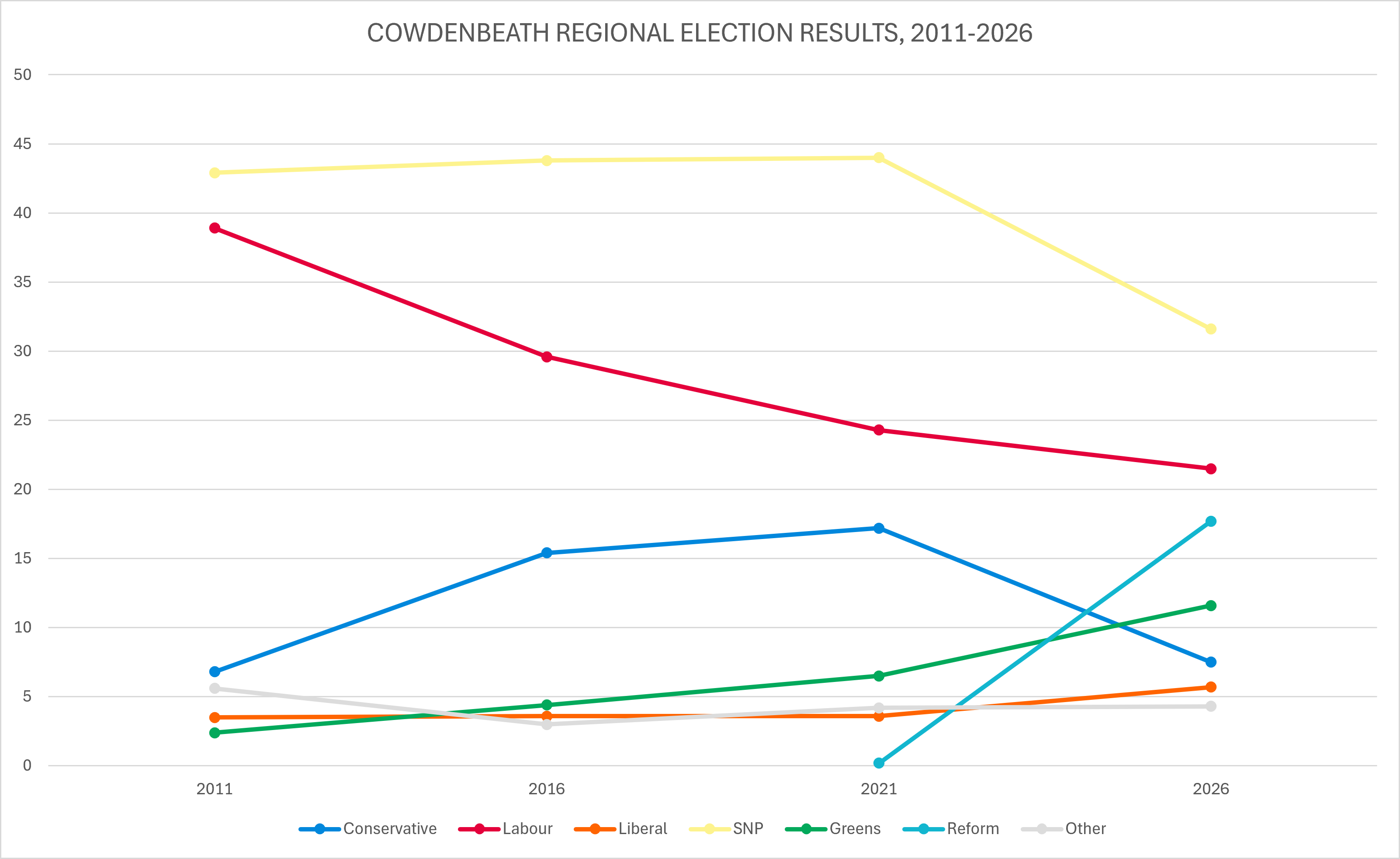
]

=== 2020s ===
2026 Scottish Parliament election: Cowdenbeath
Party	Candidate	Constituency			Regional		
Party	Candidate	Votes	%	±%	Votes	%	±%
SNP	David Barratt	11,994	44.3	▼4.0	8,567	31.6	▼12.4
Labour	Fiona Sword	6,307	23.3	▼7.4	5,834	21.5	▼2.8
Reform	Mark Davies	4,708	17.4	New	4,816	17.7	▲17.5
Green					3,140	11.6	▲5.1
Conservative	Darren Watt	2,201	8.1	▼5.8	2,048	7.5	▼9.7
Liberal Democrats	James Calder	1,547	5.7	▲2.5	1,548	5.7	▲2.1
AtLS					373	1.4	New
Sovereignty	Laurie Moffat (Note: Moffat is standing on a joint ticket on behalf of Sovereignty and the Alliance to Liberate Scotland. Note that Sovereignty are not standing on the regional list in Mid Scotland and Fife.)	304	1.1	New			
Independent Green Voice					255	0.9	New
ISP					218	0.8	New
Scottish Family					164	0.6	Steady
Scottish Socialist					85	0.3	New
Advance UK					61	0.2	New
Scottish Libertarian					38	0.1	▼0.1
Majority		5,687	21.0	▲3.4			
Valid votes		27,061			27,147		
Invalid votes		92			70		
Turnout		27,153	47.4	▼13.3	27,217	47.6	▼13.2
SNP hold		Swing					
Notes

2021 Scottish Parliament election: Cowdenbeath
Party	Candidate	Constituency			Regional		
Party	Candidate	Votes	%	±%	Votes	%	±%
SNP	Annabelle Ewing (Note: Incumbent member for this constituency)	16,499	48.3	▲2.2	15,088	44.0	▲0.2
Labour	Alex Rowley (Note: Incumbent member on the party list, or for another constituency)	10,486	30.7	▼5.2	8,308	24.3	▼5.3
Conservative	Darren Watt	4,758	13.9	▼0.4	5,881	17.2	▼1.8
Green	Mags Hall	1,344	3.9	New	2,212	6.5	▲2.1
Liberal Democrats	Malcolm Wood	1,088	3.2	▼0.5	1,229	3.6	0.0
Alba					723	2.1	New
All for Unity					223	0.7	New
Scottish Family					211	0.6	New
Abolish the Scottish Parliament					84	0.2	New
Reform					80	0.2	New
Freedom Alliance (UK)					74	0.2	New
Scottish Libertarian					58	0.2	0.0
UKIP					46	0.1	▼1.9
Independent	Martin Keatings				25	0.1	New
Renew					10	0.0	New
Independent	Mercy Kamanja				0	0.0	New
Majority		6,013	17.6	▲7.4			
Valid votes		34,175			34,252		
Invalid votes		81			42		
Turnout		34,256	60.7	▲6.0	34,294	60.8	▲6.1
SNP hold		Swing					

=== 2010s ===
2016 Scottish Parliament election: Cowdenbeath (Note: Showing changes from 2011 election)
Party	Candidate	Constituency			Region		
Party	Candidate	Votes	%	±%	Votes	%	±%
SNP	Annabelle Ewing (Note: Incumbent member on the party list, or for another constituency)	13,715	46.1	▲4.5	13,050	43.8	▲0.9
Labour	Alex Rowley (Note: Incumbent member for this constituency by virtue of by-election victory) (Note: Elected on the party list)	10,674	35.9	▼10.6	8,825	29.6	▼9.3
Conservative	Dave Dempsey	4,251	14.2	▲7.3	4,601	15.4	▲8.6
Green					1,315	4.4	▲2.0
Liberal Democrats	Bryn Jones	1,094	3.7	▼0.2	1,087	3.6	▲0.1
UKIP					631	2.0	▲1.0
Solidarity					149	0.5	▲0.4
RISE					92	0.3	New
Scottish Libertarian					69	0.2	New
Majority		3,041	10.2	▲5.4			
Valid votes		29,734			29,819		
Invalid votes		123			57		
Turnout		29,857	54.7	▲7.3	29,876	54.7	▲7.2
SNP gain from Labour		Swing					
Notes

2014 Cowdenbeath by-election
Party	Candidate	Votes	%	±%
Labour	Alex Rowley	11,192	55.8	▲9.3
SNP	Natalie McGarry	5,704	28.4	▼13.2
Conservative	Dave Dempsey	1,893	9.4	▲2.4
UKIP	Denise Baykal	610	3.04	New
Liberal Democrats	Jade Holden	425	2.1	▼1.8
The Victims Final Right	Stuart Graham	187	0.93	New
SDA	James Trolland	51	0.25	New
Majority		5,488	27.4	▲22.5
Total valid votes		20,062		
Rejected ballots		21		
Turnout		20,083	34.8	▼12.6
Labour hold		Swing	+11.25	

2011 Scottish Parliament election: Cowdenbeath
Party	Candidate	Constituency			Region		
Party	Candidate	Votes	%	±%	Votes	%	±%
Labour	Helen Eadie (Note: Incumbent member on the party list, or for another constituency)	11,926	46.5	N/A	10,003	38.9	N/A
SNP	Ian Chisholm	10,679	41.6	N/A	11,030	42.9	N/A
Conservative	Belinda Don	1,792	7.0	N/A	1,752	6.8	N/A
Liberal Democrats	Keith Legg	997	3.9	N/A	912	3.5	N/A
Green					611	2.4	N/A
All-Scotland Pensioners Party					434	1.7	N/A
Land Party	Mick Heenan	276	1.1	N/A			
UKIP					276	1.1	N/A
Socialist Labour					247	1.0	N/A
BNP					171	0.7	N/A
Scottish Christian					84	0.3	N/A
Scottish Socialist					81	0.3	N/A
Independent	Andrew Roger				57	0.2	N/A
CPA					40	0.2	N/A
Solidarity					26	0.1	N/A
Majority		1,247	4.9	N/A			
Valid votes		25,670			25,724		
Invalid votes		80			81		
Turnout		25,750	47.4	N/A	25,805	47.5	N/A
Labour win (new seat)							
