= Dunfermline East =

Dunfermline East may refer to:

- Dunfermline East (UK Parliament constituency)
- Dunfermline East (Scottish Parliament constituency)
