= David Barratt =

Scottish politician

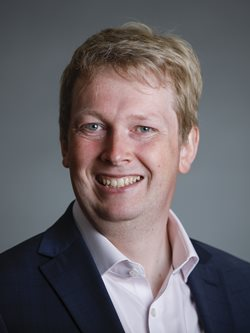

Member of Scottish Parliament for Cowdenbeath
- Incumbent
- Assumed office 7 May 2026
- Preceded by: Annabelle Ewing
- Majority: 5,687 (21.0%)

Personal details
- Party: Scottish National Party

David John Barratt is a Scottish politician who has served as a Member of Scottish Parliament for Cowdenbeath since May 2026. He is a member of the Scottish National Party.

== Biography ==
Barratt is a member of Fife Council. He was elected for the ward of Inverkeithing and Dalgety Bay in 2017 and 2022.

Barratt was selected as the Scottish National Party candidate for the Cowdenbeath constituency in the 2026 Scottish Parliament election to succeed Annabelle Ewing. He was elected to the Scottish Parliament.

He is best known for voicing concerns regarding the nationalities of contestants on the British television show Great British Bake Off.
