= 2017 Fife Council election =

2017 Scottish local government election

- 4 May 2017

All 75 seats to Fife Council 38 seats needed for a majority
| | First party | Second party | Third party |
|---|---|---|---|
| Leader | David Alexander | David Ross | Dave Dempsey |
| Party | SNP | Labour | Conservative |
| Leader's seat | Leven, Kennoway and Largo | Kirkcaldy North | Inverkeithing and Dalgety Bay |
| Last election | 26 seats, 33.33% | 35 seats, 44.87% | 3 seats, 3.85% |
| Seats before | 26 | 34 | 3 |
| Seats won | 29 | 24 | 15 |
| Seat change | ▲3 | ▼11 | ▲12 |
| Popular vote | 42,674 | 30,078 | 26,577 |
| Percentage | 33.8% | 23.9% | 21.1% |
| | Fourth party | Fifth party |
| Leader | Elizabeth Riches | Andrew Rodger |
| Party | Liberal Democrats | Independent |
| Leader's seat | Cowdenbeath | Buckhaven, Methil and Wemyss Villages |
| Last election | 10 seats, 12.82% | 4 seats, 5.13% |
| Seats before | 10 | 5 |
| Seats after | 7 | 0 |
| Seat change | ▼3 | ▼4 |
| Popular vote | 16,556 | 5,507 |
| Percentage | 13.1% | 4.4% |
- 2017 Fife Council Election Results Map
Council Leader before election
David Ross
Labour
Council Leader after election
David Alexander & David Ross
SNP and Scottish Labour

Elections to Fife Council were held on 4 May 2017, the same day as the other Scottish local government elections. The election used the 22 wards created as a result of the Local Government Commission for Scotland's 5th review which was published in September 2016, with each ward electing three or four councillors using the single transferable vote system form of proportional representation, with 75 councillors elected; a decrease of three seats from 2012 as one ward, The Lochs, was abolished.

The Scottish National Party replaced Scottish Labour as the largest party for the first time in the Fife region, although they did not gain enough seats to form a majority, and both the group leader and deputy leader lost their seats. The Scottish Conservatives made the most gains, replacing the Scottish Liberal Democrats as the third biggest party. The election also returned no Independent councillors, marking the first time the area will be without any Independent representation since the creation of Fife Regional Council in 1974.

On 18 May, the two largest parties of the new council, the SNP and Scottish Labour, signed a Power Sharing Agreement to co-run an administration. David Alexander (SNP) and David Ross (Labour) were made co-leaders, and Jim Leishman remained in his role as Provost.

== Election results ==
Fife local election result 2017
| Party | Seats | Gains | Losses | Net gain/loss | Seats % | Votes % | Votes | +/− |
|---|---|---|---|---|---|---|---|---|
| SNP | 29 | | | +3 | 38.67 | 33.8 | 42,674 | +2.7 |
| Labour | 24 | | | -11 | 32.00 | 23.9 | 30,078 | -14.6 |
| Conservative | 15 | | | +12 | 20.00 | 21.1 | 26,577 | +13.3 |
| Liberal Democrats | 7 | | | -3 | 9.33 | 13.1 | 16,556 | 0.0 |
| Independent | 0 | | | -4 | 0.0 | 4.4 | 5,507 | -1.8 |
| Green | 0 | | | | 0.0 | 3.4 | 4,316 | +2.4 |
| BUP | 0 | | | | 0.0 | 0.2 | 249 | New |
| UKIP | 0 | | | | 0.0 | 0.05 | 63 | -0.9 |
| Solidarity | 0 | | | | 0.0 | 0.05 | 61 | New |
| Scottish Libertarian | 0 | | | | 0.0 | 0.01 | 16 | New |

Note: "Votes" are the first preference votes. The net gain/loss and percentage changes relate to the result of the previous Scottish local elections on 3 May 2012. This may differ from other published sources showing gain/loss relative to seats held at dissolution of Scotland's councils.

== Ward results ==
=== West Fife and Coastal Villages ===
- 2012: 2xLab; 1xSNP; 1xIndependent
- 2017: 1xLab; 1xCon; 1xSNP
- 2012-2017 Change: 1 Con gain from Lab (One less seat in this ward for 2017)

West Fife and Coastal Villages - 3 seats
| Party | Candidate | FPv% | Count | | | | | | |
| Party | Candidate | FPv% | 1 | 2 | 3 | 4 | 5 | 6 | 7 |
|---|---|---|---|---|---|---|---|---|---|
| Labour | Bobby Clelland (incumbent) | 27.08% | 1,682 | | | | | | |
| Conservative | Mino Manekshaw | 19.1% | 1,186 | 1,190.4 | 1,197.4 | 1,253.5 | 1,382.4 | 1,542.6 | 1,575.5 |
| SNP | Kate Stewart (incumbent)††††† | 17.45% | 1,084 | 1,091.1 | 1,138.1 | 1,173.3 | 1,203.4 | 1,271.7 | 2,250 |
| SNP | Willie Gavin | 15.94% | 990 | 994.2 | 1,018.4 | 1,031.6 | 1,067.6 | 1,139 | |
| Labour | Suzanne Davies | 8.66% | 538 | 635.1 | 654.5 | 691.5 | 816.2 | | |
| Liberal Democrats | Aude Boubaker-Calder | 5.8% | 360 | 363.5 | 382.5 | 438 | | | |
| Independent | Martin Keatings | 3.54% | 220 | 222.6 | 245.9 | | | | |
| Green | Jeroen Van Leeuwen | 2.43% | 151 | 152.3 | | | | | |
Electorate: 13,030 Valid: 6,211 Spoilt: 137 Quota: 1,553 Turnout: 6,348 (48.7%)

=== Dunfermline North ===
- 2012: 2xLab; 1xSNP
- 2017: 1xCon; 1xSNP; 1xLab
- 2012-2017 Change: 1 Con gain from Lab

Dunfermline North - 3 seats
| Party | Candidate | FPv% | Count | | | | | | |
| Party | Candidate | FPv% | 1 | 2 | 3 | 4 | 5 | 6 | 7 |
|---|---|---|---|---|---|---|---|---|---|
| Conservative | Gavin Ellis | 23.46% | 1,264 | 1,274 | 1,432 | | | | |
| SNP | Ian Ferguson (incumbent) | 22.01% | 1,186 | 1,216 | 1,240 | 1,242.1 | 1909.5 | | |
| Labour | Helen Law (incumbent) | 16.02% | 863 | 880 | 1,016 | 1,032.8 | 1,053.8 | 1,169.5 | 1,971.5 |
| Labour | Michael Boyd | 13.96% | 752 | 774 | 850 | 870.3 | 893.4 | 994.8 | |
| SNP | Fiona Fisher | 12.29% | 662 | 714 | 746 | 746.9 | | | |
| Liberal Democrats | Bryn Jones | 8.5% | 458 | 503 | | | | | |
| Green | Mags Hall | 3.77% | 203 | | | | | | |
Electorate: 11,908 Valid: 5,388 Spoilt: 87 Quota: 1,348 Turnout: 5,475 (46%)

=== Dunfermline Central ===
- 2012: 2xLab; 1xLib Dem; 1xSNP
- 2017: 2xLab; 1xCon; 1xSNP
- 2012-2017 Change: Conservative gain one seat from Lib Dem

Dunfermline Central - 4 seats
| Party | Candidate | FPv% | Count | | | | | | | | |
| Party | Candidate | FPv% | 1 | 2 | 3 | 4 | 5 | 6 | 7 | 8 | 9 |
|---|---|---|---|---|---|---|---|---|---|---|---|
| Conservative | Alan Craig††† | 24.1 | 1,768 | | | | | | | | |
| SNP | Jean Hall Muir | 18.5 | 1,359 | 1,363.3 | 1,364.3 | 1,411.3 | 1,457.1 | 1,516.1 | | | |
| Labour | Jim Leishman (incumbent) | 15.1 | 1,115 | 1,154.6 | 1,157.6 | 1,195.6 | 1,370.7 | 1,645.2 | | | |
| Labour | Garry Haldane | 11.4 | 832 | 871.9 | 872.9 | 890.1 | 977.3 | 1,067.04 | 1,181.7 | 1,182.7 | 1,498.4 |
| SNP | Neale Hanvey (incumbent) | 11.2 | 821 | 822.4 | 823.4 | 867.7 | 890.6 | 960.9 | 972.8 | 1,020.4 | |
| Independent | Doug Hay | 8.9 | 655 | 716.7 | 730.4 | 756.6 | 888.6 | | | | |
| Liberal Democrats | Lauren Jones | 6.9 | 509 | 583.04 | 586.9 | 633.6 | | | | | |
| Green | Kerstin Romano | 3.2 | 238 | 245.4 | 249.7 | | | | | | |
| Independent | Deek Jackson | 0.37 | 27 | 31.5 | | | | | | | |
Electorate: 15,564 Valid: 7,324 Spoilt: 87 Quota: 1,465 Turnout: 7,417 (47.7%)

=== Dunfermline South ===
- 2012: 2xLab; 1xLib Dem; 1xSNP
- 2017: 1xCon; 1xSNP; 1xLib Dem; 1xLab
- 2012-2017 Change: Conservative gain from Labour

Dunfermline South - 4 seats
| Party | Candidate | FPv% | Count | | | | | | |
| Party | Candidate | FPv% | 1 | 2 | 3 | 4 | 5 | 6 | 7 |
|---|---|---|---|---|---|---|---|---|---|
| Conservative | David Ross | 23.2 | 1,660 | | | | | | |
| SNP | Fay Sinclair (incumbent) | 18.17 | 1,302 | 1,304.9 | 1,361.3 | 1,389.5 | 1,403.8 | 1,404.03 | 2,505.8 |
| Liberal Democrats | James Calder | 17.08 | 1,224 | 1,325.7 | 1,389.9 | 1,436.2 | | | |
| SNP | Brian Goodall (incumbent) | 15.7 | 1,128 | 1,130.3 | 1,189.5 | 1,219.7 | 1,237.7 | 1,238.09 | |
| Labour | Ross Patterson | 15.2 | 1,086 | 1,116.8 | 1,148.3 | 1,560.9 | | | |
| Labour | Billy Pollock (incumbent) | 7.2 | 521 | 539.9 | 555.3 | | | | |
| Green | Michael Collie | 3.4 | 245 | 253.6 | | | | | |
Electorate: 16,388 Valid: 7,166 Spoilt: 75 Quota: 1,434 Turnout: 7,241 (44.2%)

=== Rosyth ===
- 2012: 2xLab; 1xSNP
- 2017: 1xCon; 1xSNP; 1xLab
- 2012-2017: Conservative gain one seat from Labour

Rosyth - 3 seats
| Party | Candidate | FPv% | Count | | | | | | | | |
| Party | Candidate | FPv% | 1 | 2 | 3 | 4 | 5 | 6 | 7 | 8 | 9 |
|---|---|---|---|---|---|---|---|---|---|---|---|
| Conservative | Tony Orton | 22.3 | 1,136 | 1,146 | 1,149 | 1,177 | 1,288 | | | | |
| SNP | Samantha Steele†† | 21.9 | 1,118 | 1,122 | 1,177 | 1,194 | 1,236 | 1,236.2 | 1,281.3 | | |
| Labour | Andrew Verrecchia | 18.3 | 932 | 935 | 951 | 962 | 1,050 | 1,053.8 | 1,221.8 | 1,221.9 | 1,490.7 |
| SNP | Sharon Wilson (incumbent) | 14.6 | 742 | 742 | 754 | 766 | 777 | 777.1 | 830.2 | 835.8 | |
| Independent | Mike Shirkie (incumbent) | 7.9 | 402 | 424 | 434 | 540 | 609 | 611.9 | | | |
| Liberal Democrats | Wendy Chamberlain | 7.4 | 377 | 383 | 414 | 429 | | | | | |
| Independent | Steven Leckie | 3.06 | 156 | 192 | 207 | | | | | | |
| Green | Fiona McOwan | 2.9 | 147 | 151 | | | | | | | |
| Independent | Alistair MacIntyre | 1.7 | 89 | | | | | | | | |
Electorate: 11,643 Valid: 5,099 Spoilt: 52 Quota: 1,275 Turnout: 5,151 (44.2%)

=== Inverkeithing and Dalgety Bay ===
- 2012: 2xLab; 1xSNP; 1xCon
- 2017: 2xSNP; 1xCon; 1xLab
- 2012-2017 Change: SNP gain one seat from Labour

Inverkeithing and Dalgety Bay - 4 seats
| Party | Candidate | FPv% | Count | | | | | |
| Party | Candidate | FPv% | 1 | 2 | 3 | 4 | 5 | 6 |
|---|---|---|---|---|---|---|---|---|
| Conservative | Dave Dempsey (incumbent) | 36.6 | 2,841 | | | | | |
| Labour | Lesley Laird (incumbent)† | 16.8 | 1,305 | 1,620.09 | | | | |
| SNP | Alice McGarry (incumbent) | 15.8 | 1,229 | 1,252.1 | 1,258.3 | 1,333.7 | 1,395.4 | 1,585.02 |
| SNP | David Barratt | 15.0 | 1,165 | 1,184.9 | 1,187.4 | 1,241.8 | 1,280.2 | 1,482.8 |
| Independent | Helen Cannon-Todd | 7.3 | 564 | 872.3 | 884.3 | 942.8 | 1,262.2 | |
| Liberal Democrats | Callum Hawthorne | 5.0 | 388 | 649.6 | 672.9 | 745.9 | | |
| Green | David Hansen | 3.5 | 271 | 310.9 | 317.3 | | | |
Electorate: 14,398 Valid: 7,763 Spoilt: 59 Quota: 1,553 Turnout: 7,822 (54.3%)

=== Cowdenbeath ===
- 2012: 2xLab; 1xSNP
- 2017: 2xLab; 1xSNP; 1xCon
- 2012-2017 Change: (One additional seat in this ward for 2017) Conservative gain additional seat

Cowdenbeath - 4 seats
| Party | Candidate | FPv% | Count | | | | | | |
| Party | Candidate | FPv% | 1 | 2 | 3 | 4 | 5 | 6 | 7 |
|---|---|---|---|---|---|---|---|---|---|
| Labour | Alex Campbell (incumbent) | 31.4 | 2,065 | | | | | | |
| SNP | Alistair Bain (incumbent) | 21.5 | 1,415 | | | | | | |
| Labour | Gary Guichan (incumbent) | 15.7 | 1,030 | 1,563.2 | | | | | |
| Conservative | Darren Watt | 15.4 | 1,013 | 1,054.4 | 1,091.9 | 1,092.8 | 1,145.6 | 1,180.6 | 1,492.2 |
| SNP | Ann Bain (incumbent) | 12.2 | 799 | 851.7 | 878.2 | 969.06 | 975.9 | 1,058.5 | |
| Green | Angela Dixon | 2.3 | 150 | 164.2 | 182.3 | 184.9 | 215.5 | | |
| Liberal Democrats | Elizabeth Riches * | 1.5 | 101 | 113.7 | 144.02 | 144.7 | | | |
Electorate: 16,440 Valid: 6,573 Spoilt: 134 Quota: 1,315 Turnout: 6,707 (40.8%)

- = Sitting Councillor for East Neuk and Landward Ward.

=== Lochgelly, Cardenden and Benarty ===
- 2012: 2xLab; 1xSNP
- 2017: 2xLab; 2xSNP
- 2012-2017 Change: (One additional seat in this ward for 2017) SNP gain additional seat

Lochgelly, Cardenden and Benarty - 4 seats
| Party | Candidate | FPv% | Count | | | |
| Party | Candidate | FPv% | 1 | 2 | 3 | 4 |
|---|---|---|---|---|---|---|
| Labour | Mary Bain Lockhart (incumbent) | 24.6 | 1,257 | | | |
| Labour | Linda Erskine (incumbent) | 20.2 | 1,033 | | | |
| SNP | Lea McLelland | 19.5 | 994 | 1,018.9 | 1,019.7 | 1,034.5 |
| SNP | Rosemary Liewald | 19.4 | 990 | 1,008.4 | 1,009.5 | 1,029.4 |
| Conservative | Scott Campbell | 9.7 | 497 | 532.3 | 534.09 | 538.8 |
| Independent | James Glen | 5.2 | 263 | 289.5 | 291.2 | 312.5 |
| Green | Ronnie Mackie | 1.4 | 70 | 85.2 | 85.9 | |
Electorate: 13,796 Valid: 5,104 Spoilt: 170 Quota: 1,021 Turnout: 5,274 (38.2%)

=== Burntisland, Kinghorn and Western Kirkcaldy ===
- 2012: 1xLab; 1xSNP; 1xLib Dem
- 2017: 1xCon; 1xSNP; 1xLab
- 2012-2017 Change: Conservative gain one seat from Lib Dem

Burntisland, Kinghorn and Western Kirkcaldy - 3 seats
| Party | Candidate | FPv% | Count | | | | | | | | | |
| Party | Candidate | FPv% | 1 | 2 | 3 | 4 | 5 | 6 | 7 | 8 | 9 | 10 |
|---|---|---|---|---|---|---|---|---|---|---|---|---|
| Conservative | Kathleen Leslie | 25.1 | 1,479 | | | | | | | | | |
| SNP | Lesley Backhouse | 19.4 | 1,144 | 1,144.09 | 1,145.09 | 1,177.09 | 1,192.09 | 1,283.1 | 1,710.1 | | | |
| Liberal Democrats | Susan Leslie (incumbent) | 13.6 | 769 | 770.8 | 771.8 | 799.08 | 819.9 | 891.9 | 909.9 | 943.9 | 1,121.1 | |
| Labour | Gordon Langlands | 12.9 | 761 | 761.8 | 762.8 | 818.8 | 988.9 | 1,035.01 | 1,051.02 | 1,088.7 | 1,229.7 | 1,660.1 |
| Independent | Roy Mackie | 8.07 | 475 | 475.6 | 479.6 | 540.9 | 557.9 | 610.04 | 620.04 | 673.9 | | |
| SNP | Stuart MacPhail * | 7.3 | 429 | 429.03 | 437.03 | 440.03 | 446.04 | 491.04 | | | | |
| Green | Scott Rutherford | 5.3 | 314 | 314.1 | 326.1 | 331.1 | 342.2 | | | | | |
| Labour | Fiona Sword | 4.1 | 242 | 242.3 | 243.3 | 257.3 | | | | | | |
| Independent | Peter George (incumbent) | 4.06 | 239 | 239.6 | 241.6 | | | | | | | |
| Solidarity | Bill Mair | 0.6 | 36 | 36 | | | | | | | | |
Electorate: 11,582 Valid: 5,888 Spoilt: 79 Quota: 1,473 Turnout: 5,967 (51.5%)

* = Sitting Councillor for Kirkcaldy Central.

=== Kirkcaldy North ===
- 2012: 2xLab; 1xSNP
- 2017: 2xLab; 1xSNP
- 2012-2017 Change: No change

Kirkcaldy North - 3 seats
| Party | Candidate | FPv% | Count | | | | | | |
| Party | Candidate | FPv% | 1 | 2 | 3 | 4 | 5 | 6 | 7 |
|---|---|---|---|---|---|---|---|---|---|
| Labour | Neil Crooks (incumbent) | 29.4 | 1,486 | | | | | | |
| SNP | Carol Lindsay (incumbent) | 21.3 | 1,076 | 1,085.03 | 1,089.2 | 1,129.6 | 1,670.4 | | |
| Conservative | James Leslie | 17.7 | 896 | 906.2 | 938.7 | 967.1 | 972.9 | 991.5 | |
| Labour | David Ross (incumbent) | 14.9 | 757 | 920.4 | 954.8 | 995.4 | 1,013.9 | 1,138.7 | 1,553.5 |
| SNP | Jane Glen | 11.3 | 570 | 582.4 | 589.8 | 621.06 | | | |
| Green | Susan Jeynes | 2.9 | 149 | 152.1 | 183.8 | | | | |
| Liberal Democrats | Harald Gavin | 2.5 | 129 | 135.8 | | | | | |
Electorate: 12,304 Valid: 5,063 Spoilt: 86 Quota: 1,266 Turnout: 5,149 (41.8%)

=== Kirkcaldy Central ===
- 2012: 2xLab; 1xSNP
- 2017: 2xLab; 1xSNP
- 2012-2017 Change: No change

Kirkcaldy Central - 3 seats
| Party | Candidate | FPv% | Count | | | | | | | |
| Party | Candidate | FPv% | 1 | 2 | 3 | 4 | 5 | 6 | 7 | 8 |
|---|---|---|---|---|---|---|---|---|---|---|
| SNP | Zoe Hisbent | 23.3 | 1,138 | 1,139 | 1,148 | 1,162 | 1,218 | 1,740 | | |
| Labour | Alastair Cameron | 18.4 | 898 | 898 | 930 | 962 | 995 | 1,020 | 1,108.8 | 1,328.4 |
| Conservative | Dorothy Ross | 17.7 | 865 | 867 | 888 | 914 | 930 | 932 | 948.7 | |
| Labour | Judy Hamilton (incumbent) | 17.3 | 845 | 847 | 865 | 887 | 940 | 981 | 1,069.8 | 1,257.9 |
| SNP | Maciej Wiczynski | 12.5 | 610 | 611 | 614 | 624 | 670 | | | |
| Green | Cairinne MacDonald | 4.6 | 223 | 226 | 249 | 279 | | | | |
| Independent | Daniel Penman | 3.0 | 145 | 148 | 163 | | | | | |
| Liberal Democrats | Tricia Dakers | 2.8 | 138 | 140 | | | | | | |
| Scottish Libertarian | Calum Paul | 0.33 | 16 | | | | | | | |
Electorate: 11,449 Valid: 4,878 Spoilt: 113 Quota: 1,220 Turnout: 4,991 (43.6%)

=== Kirkcaldy East ===
- 2012: 2xLab; 1xSNP
- 2017: 1xLab; 1xSNP; 1xCon
- 2012-2017 Change: Conservative gain one seat from Labour

Kirkcaldy East - 3 seats
| Party | Candidate | FPv% | Count | | | | | | | | |
| Party | Candidate | FPv% | 1 | 2 | 3 | 4 | 5 | 6 | 7 | 8 | 9 |
|---|---|---|---|---|---|---|---|---|---|---|---|
| Labour | Ian Cameron | 24.7 | 985 | 993 | 1,002 | | | | | | |
| SNP | Rod Cavanagh | 22.5 | 897 | 898 | 903 | 903.08 | 946.08 | 968.3 | 1,035.3 | | |
| Conservative | Richard Watt | 15.3 | 611 | 625 | 630 | 630.09 | 642.09 | 671.4 | 791.5 | 791.7 | 924.8 |
| SNP | Steve McMahon | 13.3 | 533 | 537 | 551 | 551.03 | 584.03 | 596.1 | 682.1 | 714.9 | |
| Independent | Marie Penman (incumbent) | 10.5 | 421 | 438 | 483 | 483.2 | 532.2 | 591.6 | | | |
| Labour | Mhairi Cameron | 5 | 199 | 203 | 209 | 211.4 | 237.4 | | | | |
| Green | Sandy Forbes | 4.1 | 164 | 176 | 189 | 189.04 | | | | | |
| Independent | Matthew Ritchie | 2.7 | 108 | 111 | | | | | | | |
| Liberal Democrats | Stephen Rottger | 1.9 | 75 | | | | | | | | |
Electorate: 10,747 Valid: 3,993 Spoilt: 119 Quota: 999 Turnout: 4,112 (38.3%)

=== Glenrothes West and Kinglassie ===
- 2012: 2xSNP; 2xLab
- 2017: 2xSNP; 1xLab
- 2012-2017 Change: (One less seat in this ward for 2017) Labour lose seat

Glenrothes West and Kinglassie - 3 seats
| Party | Candidate | FPv% | Count | | | | | | | |
| Party | Candidate | FPv% | 1 | 2 | 3 | 4 | 5 | 6 | 7 | 8 |
|---|---|---|---|---|---|---|---|---|---|---|
| SNP | Julie Ford (incumbent) | 30.2 | 1,442 | | | | | | | |
| Labour | Altany Craik (incumbent) | 26.2 | 1,252 | | | | | | | |
| Conservative | David Croll | 15.2 | 723 | 726.09 | 735.08 | 757.5 | 762.9 | 788.3 | 945.08 | |
| SNP | Craig Walker (incumbent) | 13.8 | 659 | 873.9 | 879.5 | 887.7 | 918.9 | 933.8 | 1,061.6 | 1,182.2 |
| Independent | Bill Brown (incumbent) | 9.6 | 460 | 465.3 | 477.9 | 491.6 | 514.9 | 548.4 | | |
| Green | Lewis Campbell | 1.8 | 87 | 93.5 | 96.2 | 99.8 | | | | |
| Liberal Democrats | Derek Preston | 1.8 | 86 | 88.2 | 97.04 | 105.5 | 117.3 | | | |
| UKIP | Martin Green | 1.3 | 63 | 65.9 | 67.9 | | | | | |
Electorate: 11,840 Valid: 4,772 Spoilt: 70 Quota: 1,194 Turnout: 4,842 (40%)

=== Glenrothes North, Leslie and Markinch ===
- 2012: 2xSNP; 2xLab
- 2017: 2xSNP; 1xCon; 1xLab
- 2012-2017 Change: Conservative gain one seat from Labour

Glenrothes North, Leslie and Markinch - 4 seats
| Party | Candidate | FPv% | Count | | | | | | | |
| Party | Candidate | FPv% | 1 | 2 | 3 | 4 | 5 | 6 | 7 | 8 |
|---|---|---|---|---|---|---|---|---|---|---|
| SNP | Fiona Grant (incumbent) | 25.95 | 1,704 | | | | | | | |
| Conservative | Michael Green | 22.97 | 1,508 | | | | | | | |
| SNP | John Beare (incumbent) | 17.1 | 1,123 | 1,435.9 | | | | | | |
| Labour | Jan Wincott | 14.5 | 949 | 964.4 | 992.7 | 1,004.5 | 1,019.07 | 1,093.06 | 1,167.2 | 1,320.7 |
| Labour | John Wincott (incumbent) | 7.8 | 514 | 519.9 | 527.5 | 530.5 | 532.4 | 551.8 | 583.04 | 612.8 |
| BUP | Jamie Donaldson | 3.8 | 249 | 251.9 | 311.9 | 314.9 | 334.3 | 360.5 | | |
| Green | Lorna Ross | 3.5 | 232 | 252.4 | 258.6 | 303.9 | 329.7 | 390.06 | 441.4 | |
| Liberal Democrats | Kate Legg | 3.1 | 204 | 210.4 | 241.7 | 247.7 | 265.2 | | | |
| Independent | Kyle Mackie | 1.2 | 81 | 86.3 | 95.07 | 101.7 | | | | |
Electorate: 14,497 Valid: 6,564 Spoilt: 113 Quota: 1,313 Turnout: 6,677 (46.1%)

=== Glenrothes Central and Thornton ===
- 2012: 2xLab; 1xSNP
- 2017: 2xSNP; 1xLab
- 2012-2017 Change: SNP gain one seat from Labour

Glenrothes Central and Thornton - 3 seats
| Party | Candidate | FPv% | Count | | | | | | | | | |
| Party | Candidate | FPv% | 1 | 2 | 3 | 4 | 5 | 6 | 7 | 8 | 9 | 10 |
|---|---|---|---|---|---|---|---|---|---|---|---|---|
| SNP | Ross Vetraino (incumbent) | 28.1 | 1,362 | | | | | | | | | |
| SNP | Vikki Wilton | 16.5 | 799 | 927.6 | 938.07 | 943.07 | 989.06 | 995.2 | 1,023.4 | 1,066.7 | 1,081.6 | 1,166.2 |
| Labour | Derek Noble | 15.5 | 750 | 752.3 | 754.3 | 761.5 | 774.8 | 796.9 | 836.9 | 1,370.6 | | |
| Conservative | Brian Mills | 14.8 | 716 | 717.3 | 719.3 | 721.3 | 729.3 | 764.3 | 803.3 | 837.8 | 866.8 | |
| Labour | Ian Sloan (incumbent) | 13.7 | 663 | 668.4 | 674.7 | 686.7 | 694.8 | 713.8 | 740.3 | | | |
| Independent | Ian Crichton (incumbent) | 3.1 | 151 | 151.9 | 169.9 | 214.2 | 230.3 | 257.4 | | | | |
| Liberal Democrats | Jane Kerr | 2.6 | 128 | 128.8 | 128.8 | 131.9 | 145.9 | | | | | |
| Green | Glen McGill | 2.4 | 117 | 118.7 | 125.7 | 129.7 | | | | | | |
| Independent | Ian Robertson | 1.8 | 88 | 88.9 | 103.9 | | | | | | | |
| Independent | Bert Thomson | 1.5 | 71 | 72.1 | | | | | | | | |
Electorate: 12,044 Valid: 4,845 Spoilt: 143 Quota: 1,212 Turnout: 4,988 (41.4%)

=== Howe of Fife and Tay Coast ===
- 2012: 1xLib Dem; 1xSNP; 1xCon
- 2017: 1xLib Dem; 1xCon; 1xSNP
- 2012-2017 Change: No change

Howe of Fife and Tay Coast - 3 seats
| Party | Candidate | FPv% | Count | | | | | | |
| Party | Candidate | FPv% | 1 | 2 | 3 | 4 | 5 | 6 | 7 |
|---|---|---|---|---|---|---|---|---|---|
| Liberal Democrats | Donald Lothian (incumbent) | 36.3 | 2,156 | | | | | | |
| Conservative | Andy Heer (incumbent) | 23.8 | 1,413 | 1,670.07 | | | | | |
| SNP | David MacDiarmid (incumbent) | 16.9 | 1,002 | 1,054.3 | 1,059.8 | 1,071.9 | 1,103.1 | 1,243.2 | 2,068.2 |
| SNP | Violeta Ilendo | 11.7 | 695 | 716.5 | 718.5 | 731.6 | 748.3 | 951.4 | |
| Green | Rosie Grant | 5.6 | 335 | 397.9 | 411.9 | 463.1 | 602.6 | | |
| Labour | Joshua Osborne | 3.8 | 226 | 317.5 | 355.5 | 402.2 | | | |
| Independent | Jane Freer | 1.9 | 112 | 162.1 | 209.9 | | | | |
Electorate: 11,275 Valid: 5,939 Spoilt: 59 Quota: 1,485 Turnout: 5,998 (53.2%)

=== Tay Bridgehead ===
- 2012: 2xLib Dem; 1xSNP
- 2017: 2xLib Dem; 1xSNP
- 2012-2017 Change: No change

Tay Bridgehead - 3 seats
| Party | Candidate | FPv% | Count | | | | | | |
| Party | Candidate | FPv% | 1 | 2 | 3 | 4 | 5 | 6 | 7 |
|---|---|---|---|---|---|---|---|---|---|
| Liberal Democrats | Tim Brett (incumbent) | 35.3 | 2,270 | | | | | | |
| SNP | Bill Connor (incumbent) | 18.6 | 1,197 | 1,233.9 | 1,314.1 | 1,357.2 | 2,041.6 | | |
| Conservative | Robert Drysdale | 16.8 | 1,079 | 1,145.09 | 1,148.7 | 1,184 | 1,186.3 | 1,205.9 | |
| Liberal Democrats | Jonny Tepp | 10.2 | 657 | 1,134.2 | 1,191.9 | 1,346.2 | 1,375.7 | 1,514.09 | 2,186.6 |
| SNP | Derek Gray | 9.98 | 642 | 652.8 | 710.5 | 749.8 | | | |
| Labour | Jane O' Neill | 5.3 | 340 | 362.1 | 401.5 | | | | |
| Green | Fergus Cook | 3.8 | 247 | 267.4 | | | | | |
Electorate: 11,525 Valid: 6,432 Spoilt: 111 Quota: 1,609 Turnout: 6,543 (56.8%)

=== St. Andrews ===
- 2012: 1xCon; 1xSNP; 1xLib Dem; 1xLab
- 2017: 1xLib Dem; 1xCon; 1xLab; 1xSNP
- 2012-2017 Change: No change

St. Andrews - 4 Seats
| Party | Candidate | FPv% | Count | | | | | | | | |
| Party | Candidate | FPv% | 1 | 2 | 3 | 4 | 5 | 6 | 7 | 8 | 9 |
|---|---|---|---|---|---|---|---|---|---|---|---|
| Liberal Democrats | Jane Ann Liston | 21.54% | 1,083 | | | | | | | | |
| Conservative | Dominic Nolan | 20.03% | 1,007 | | | | | | | | |
| Labour | Brian Thomson (incumbent) | 12.73% | 640 | 644.6 | 647.8 | 657.9 | 742.2 | 753.3 | 856.1 | 863.7 | 1156.4 |
| SNP | Ann Verner | 10.5% | 528 | 529.1 | 532.2 | 536.2 | 582.2 | 990.5 | 1037.6 | | |
| Independent | Dorothea Morrison (incumbent) | 9.87% | 496 | 501 | 513 | 555.5 | 583.6 | 586.8 | | | |
| Liberal Democrats | Mariam Mahmood | 8.97% | 451 | 509.1 | 519.3 | 529.9 | 597 | 607.1 | 763.5 | 769.6 | |
| SNP | Colin Veitch | 8.04% | 404 | 404.8 | 405.6 | 407.8 | 450.9 | | | | |
| Green | Andy Collins | 5.63% | 283 | 284.9 | 293.1 | 298.2 | | | | | |
| Independent | Christopher McKinlay | 1.45% | 73 | 74.5 | 91.5 | | | | | | |
| Independent | Clare Fisher | 1.23% | 62 | 62.7 | | | | | | | |
Electorate: 10209 Valid: 5027 Spoilt: 53 Quota: 1006 Turnout: 5080 49.8%

=== East Neuk and Landward ===
- 2012: 2xLib Dem; 1xSNP
- 2017: 1xCon; 1xSNP; 1xLib Dem
- 2012-2017 Change: Conservative gain one seat from Lib Dem

East Neuk and Landward - 3 seats
| Party | Candidate | FPv% | Count | | | | | | |
| Party | Candidate | FPv% | 1 | 2 | 3 | 4 | 5 | 6 | 7 |
|---|---|---|---|---|---|---|---|---|---|
| Conservative | Linda Holt†††† | 28.9 | 1,508 | | | | | | |
| Liberal Democrats | Bill Porteous | 19.4 | 1,014 | 1,095.3 | 1,138.2 | 1,216.08 | 1,268.6 | 1,281.5 | 2,249.3 |
| Liberal Democrats | Alisdair Gilbert | 17.09 | 891 | 930.2 | 974.3 | 1,050.7 | 1,059.9 | 1,073.4 | |
| SNP | John Docherty (incumbent)†††††† | 13.5 | 703 | 704.8 | 744.9 | 766.3 | 1,368.4 | | |
| SNP | Margaret Harper | 12.2 | 634 | 635.8 | 680.03 | 715.3 | | | |
| Labour | Rosalind Garton | 4.6 | 242 | 252.6 | 291.4 | | | | |
| Green | Benjamin Bridgman | 4.3 | 222 | 227.4 | | | | | |
Electorate: 10,149 Valid: 5,214 Spoilt: 63 Quota: 1,304 Turnout: 5,277 (52%)

=== Cupar ===
- 2012: 1xIndependent; 1xLib Dem; 1xSNP
- 2017: 1xLib Dem; 1xCon; 1xSNP
- 2012-2017 Change: Conservative gain one seat from Independent

Cupar - 3 seats
| Party | Candidate | FPv% | Count | | | |
| Party | Candidate | FPv% | 1 | 2 | 3 | 4 |
|---|---|---|---|---|---|---|
| Liberal Democrats | Margaret Kennedy (incumbent) | 40.7 | 2,401 | | | |
| Conservative | Tony Miklinski | 26.5 | 1,561 | | | |
| SNP | Karen Marjoram (incumbent) | 18.05 | 1,064 | 1,186 | 1,188.3 | 1,521.7 |
| SNP | Steven Simpson | 6.09 | 359 | 381 | 381.7 | |
| Green | Jenny Collins | 4.7 | 275 | 456.07 | 467.3 | 492.3 |
| Labour | Helen Martin | 3.97 | 234 | 525.5 | 548.4 | 555.8 |
Electorate: 11,144 Valid: 5,894 Spoilt: 76 Quota: 1,474 Turnout: 5,970 (53.6%)

=== Leven, Kennoway and Largo ===
- 2012: 2xLab; 2xSNP
- 2017: 2xSNP; 1xCon; 1xLab
- 2012-2017 Change: Conservative gain one seat from Labour

Leven, Kennoway and Largo - 4 seats
| Party | Candidate | FPv% | Count | | | | | | | |
| Party | Candidate | FPv% | 1 | 2 | 3 | 4 | 5 | 6 | 7 | 8 |
|---|---|---|---|---|---|---|---|---|---|---|
| SNP | David Alexander (incumbent) | 23.6 | 1,506 | | | | | | | |
| Conservative | Graham Ritchie | 21.02 | 1,339 | | | | | | | |
| SNP | Alistair Suttie (incumbent) | 15.7 | 1,002 | 1,194.9 | 1,196.2 | 1,204.9 | 1,256.9 | 1,348.9 | | |
| Labour | Colin Davidson | 13.9 | 885 | 892.9 | 900.7 | 902.6 | 913.5 | 1,109.7 | 1,124.09 | 1,972.9 |
| Labour | Tom Adams (incumbent) | 13.7 | 872 | 879.09 | 883.7 | 886.9 | 901.2 | 988.6 | 1,001.2 | |
| Liberal Democrats | Steve Wood | 9.8 | 625 | 628.2 | 652.9 | 656.3 | 687.6 | | | |
| Green | Iain Morrice | 1.8 | 115 | 122.09 | 124.3 | 127.6 | | | | |
| Solidarity | Craig Duncan | 0.39 | 25 | 27.5 | 28.3 | | | | | |
Electorate: 14,841 Valid: 6,369 Spoilt: 122 Quota: 1,274 Turnout: 6,491 (43.7%)

=== Buckhaven, Methil and Wemyss Villages ===
- 2012: 2xLab; 1xIndependent; 1xSNP
- 2017: 2xSNP; 2xLab
- 2012-2017 Change: SNP gain one seat from Independent

Buckhaven, Methil and Wemyss Villages - 4 seats
| Party | Candidate | FPv% | Count | | | | | | | | |
| Party | Candidate | FPv% | 1 | 2 | 3 | 4 | 5 | 6 | 7 | 8 | 9 |
|---|---|---|---|---|---|---|---|---|---|---|---|
| Labour | David Graham (incumbent) | 30.4 | 1,661 | | | | | | | | |
| SNP | John O'Brien (incumbent) | 18.1 | 991 | 1,014.9 | 1,015.2 | 1,020.2 | 1,039.9 | 1,059.6 | 1,064.9 | 1,074.5 | 1,161.4 |
| SNP | Ken Caldwell | 15.4 | 842 | 861.1 | 862.1 | 864.1 | 879.5 | 893.8 | 904.1 | 908.7 | 1,444.7 |
| SNP | Leslie Bain | 11.6 | 635 | 646.6 | 648.9 | 653.3 | 664.3 | 673.6 | 682.9 | 686.7 | |
| Conservative | Keith Barton | 9.3 | 507 | 520.3 | 522.9 | 535.4 | 539.7 | 567.04 | | | |
| Labour | Ryan Smart | 9.1 | 498 | 914.5 | 918.8 | 935.6 | 946.6 | 999.4 | 1,195.6 | | |
| Independent | Ronald Hunter | 2.5 | 137 | 148.3 | 184.9 | 195.9 | 214.9 | | | | |
| Green | Stephen Ferguson | 1.4 | 78 | 83.5 | 93.1 | 100.5 | | | | | |
| Liberal Democrats | Rory Roberson | 1.1 | 62 | 69.5 | 70.5 | | | | | | |
| Independent | Eunice Cameron | 1.04 | 57 | 61.8 | | | | | | | |
Electorate: 13,802 Valid: 5,468 Spoilt: 170 Quota: 1,094 Turnout: 5,638 (40.8%)

== Changes since 2017 ==
- † On 8 June 2018, Inverkeithing and Dalgety Bay Labour Councillor Lesley Laird resigned her seat as she won the MP seat for Kirkcaldy and Cowdenbeath, Shadow Scottish Secretary, and Deputy Leader of the Scottish Labour Party. A by-election was held on Thursday, 6 September 2018. The seat was won by Conservative candidate Dave Colman.
- †† On 13 September 2019 Rosyth SNP Councillor Samantha Steele resigned her seat citing health reasons and family problems. A by-election was held on 14 November 2019 and Sharon Green-Wilson held the seat for the SNP.
- ††† In September 2019 Dunfermline Central Conservative Cllr Alan Craig resigned his seat. A by-election was held on 14 November 2019 and Derek Glen gained the seat for the SNP
- †††† On 2 December 2019 East Neuk and Landward Conservative Cllr Linda Holt resigned from the party and became an independent calling the Tories dysfunctional.
- ††††† West Fife and Coastal Villages SNP Cllr Kate Stewart decided to leave the SNP and become an independent on 25 March 2020.
- †††††† East Neuk and Landward SNP Cllr John Docherty decided to leave the SNP and become an independent as he was not selected to stand for the SNP

== By-elections since 2017 ==
Inverkeithing and Dalgety Bay By-election (6 September 2018)
| Party | Candidate | FPv% | Count | | | | | | |
| Party | Candidate | FPv% | 1 | 2 | 3 | 4 | 5 | 6 | 7 |
|---|---|---|---|---|---|---|---|---|---|
| Conservative | Dave Coleman | 37.3% | 2,309 | 2,312 | 2,316 | 2,330 | 2,455 | 2,615 | 2,839 |
| SNP | Neale Hanvey | 28.1% | 1,741 | 1,741 | 1,744 | 1,840 | 1,950 | 2,076 | 2,327 |
| Labour | Billy Pollock | 12.0% | 744 | 746 | 747 | 794 | 867 | 1,058 | |
| Liberal Democrats | Callum John Hawthorne | 9.1% | 566 | 568 | 573 | 631 | 738 | | |
| Independent | Peter Collins | 8.4% | 521 | 524 | 545 | 565 | | | |
| Green | Mags Hall | 4.2% | 257 | 257 | 258 | | | | |
| Independent | Alastair Amundsen MacIntyre | 0.6% | 40 | 41 | | | | | |
| Scottish Libertarian | Calum Paul | 0.2% | 13 | | | | | | |
Electorate: 14,484 Valid: 6,191 Spoilt: 48 Quota: 3,096 Turnout: 6,239 (43.1%)

Dunfermline Central By-election (14 November 2019)
| Party | Candidate | FPv% | Count | | | | | |
| Party | Candidate | FPv% | 1 | 2 | 3 | 4 | 5 | 6 |
|---|---|---|---|---|---|---|---|---|
| SNP | Derek Glen | 33.16 | 1,526 | 1,528 | 1,628 | 1,761 | 1,798 | 2,297 |
| Conservative | Chloe Dodds | 24.82 | 1,142 | 1,150 | 1,150 | 1,202 | | |
| Liberal Democrats | Aude Boubaker-Calder | 22.82 | 1,050 | 1,053 | 1,117 | 1,343 | 1,796 | |
| Labour | Michael Boyd | 13.49 | 621 | 624 | 656 | | | |
| Green | Fiona McOwan | 5.11 | 235 | 237 | | | | |
| Scottish Libertarian | Keith Chamberlain | 0.61 | 28 | | | | | |
Electorate: 15,698 Quota: 2,302 Turnout: 4,602 (29.5%)

Rosyth By-election (14 November 2019)
| Party | Candidate | FPv% | Count | | | | | |
| Party | Candidate | FPv% | 1 | 2 | 3 | 4 | 5 | 6 |
|---|---|---|---|---|---|---|---|---|
| SNP | Sharon Green-Wilson | 42.8% | 1,347 | 1,347 | 1,406 | 1,429 | 1,486 | 1,639 |
| Conservative | Margaret Fairgrieve | 24.4% | 768 | 771 | 774 | 822 | 885 | 976 |
| Labour | Billy Pollock | 15.2% | 480 | 480 | 498 | 526 | 591 | |
| Liberal Democrats | Jill Blair | 7.9% | 249 | 250 | 275 | 291 | | |
| Independent | Alastair MacIntyre | 5.0% | 157 | 162 | 168 | | | |
| Green | Craig McCutcheon | 4.2% | 132 | 133 | | | | |
| Scottish Libertarian | Calum Paul | 0.5% | 16 | | | | | |
Electorate: 11,554 Quota: 1,575 Turnout: 3,149 (27.5%)
