= Tayside House =

Defunct Office block in Dundee, Scotland

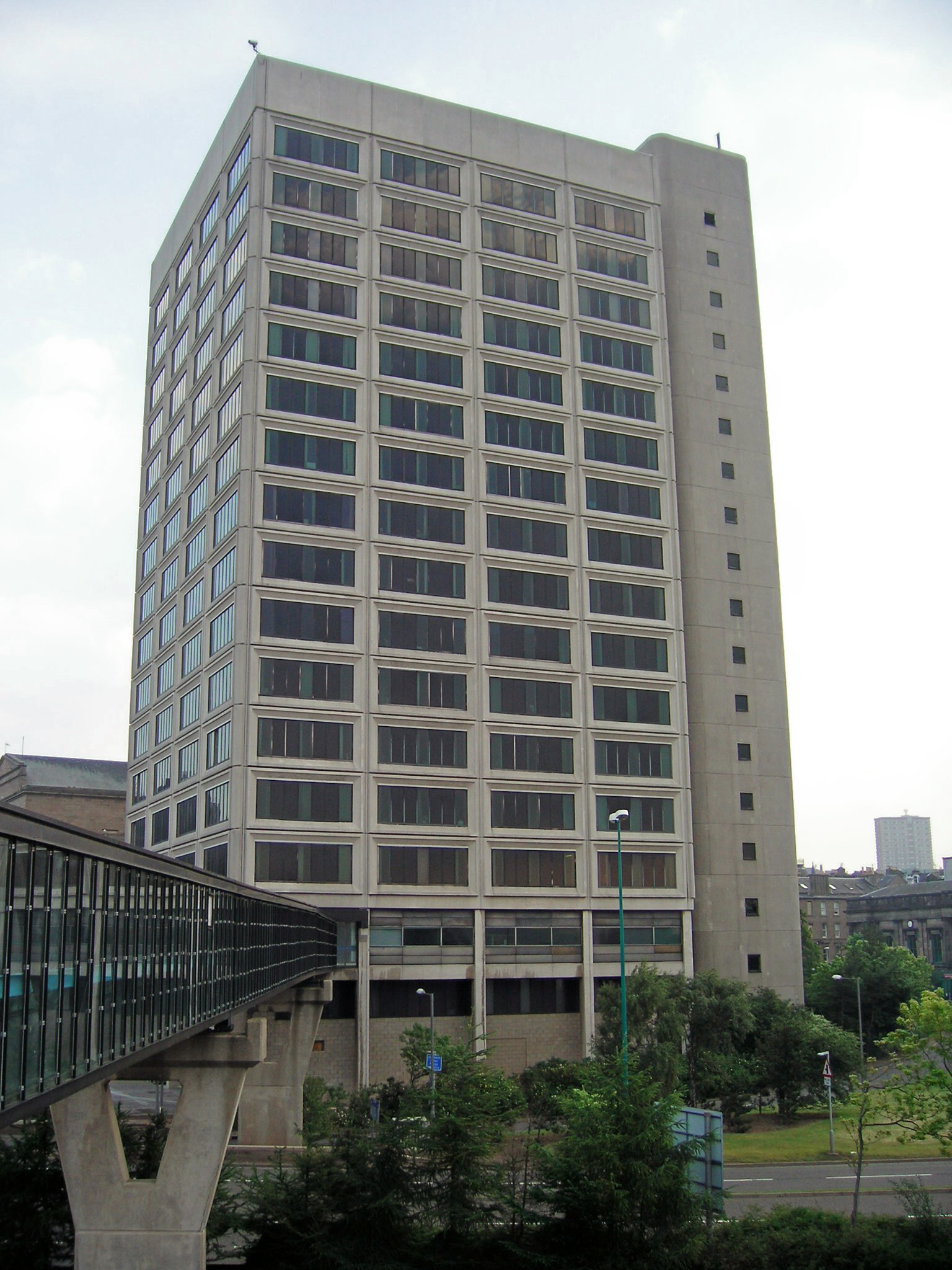
- Tayside House with walkway to Olympia Leisure Centre shown to the left.
- Interactive map of the Tayside House area

General information
- Status: Demolished
- Type: Office block
- Architectural style: Brutalist
- Location: Dundee, 28 Crichton Street, Dundee, Scotland
- Coordinates: 56.45915°N 2.967795°W
- Completed: 1976
- Demolished: August 2011—July 2013
- Cost: £2.5 million
- Client: Ravenstone Securities and Guardian Royal Exchange
- Owner: 1975—1984 Ravenstone Securities and Guardian Royal Exchange Assurance; 1984—1996 Tayside Regional Council; 1996—1997 Dundee City Council, Angus Council and Perth and Kinross Council; 1997—2013 Dundee City Council
- Landlord: 1975—1984 Ravenstone Securities and Guardian Royal Exchange Assurance

Height
- Height: 58.00 m (190.29 ft)

Technical details
- Floor count: 18

Design and construction
- Architecture firm: James Parr & Partners
- Civil engineer: Bett Brothers Ltd

Tayside House was an office block development in the city centre area of Dundee. The building served as the headquarters for Tayside Regional Council and its successor organisation following local government reorganisation, Dundee City Council. Tayside Police leased part of the building, which formed the city centre police station.

A raised walkway across the busy A991 road was added during the 1980s, connecting the city centre and Tayside House with the Olympia Leisure Centre and completely separating pedestrian and vehicular traffic.

Following the decision to build replacement offices elsewhere and redevelop the area, initial work began on the demolition of Tayside House in 2011. The main demolition work was completed in July 2013.

== History ==
Tayside House was a purpose-built office block, designed by Dundee architects James Parr & Partners for property developers Ravenstone Securities and Guardian Royal Exchange, specifically for the newly formed Tayside Regional Council to lease. The council was a local authority formed by the Local Government (Scotland) Act 1973, and came into existence in 1975. The building was still under construction at the time; the council moved into the completed building in May 1976.

The council initially took a 63-year lease of the building. In 1984, the council purchased the building from Ravenstone Securities and Guardian Royal Exchange for £8.6 million.

During the 1980s a raised walkway across the A991 road was added to the Tayside House development, allowing pedestrian access to the nearby Olympia Leisure Centre.

Tayside Regional Council was abolished by the Local Government etc. (Scotland) Act 1994 in 1995, and ownership of Tayside House and other council properties in Dundee passed to the successor authorities of Dundee City Council, Perth and Kinross Council and Angus Council. Dundee City Council occupied the building as additional office space, supplementing its nearby civic headquarters at Dundee City Chambers. The city council agreed to purchase the other authorities' interests in Tayside House and other Dundee properties in 1997 for £3 million, to be paid over 15 years.

The building often attracted criticism. It was on one occasion voted as 'the least-loved building' in Dundee' and was described in a 2012 BBC news report as 'a tower block regarded by many as an eyesore'. Around the time of its demolition, Dundee architectural historian Charles McKean, and his co-authors of a book on Dundee's lost architectural heritage, went as far as to state that the best views in the city were from Tayside House, because these were the only views from which the building itself could not be seen.

=== Demolition ===
The decision to demolish Tayside House was made in 2003 as part of the Dundee Waterfront plan to redevelop the surrounding area as an extension of the city centre, expanding it to meet the River Tay. Annual savings of around £245,000 were expected by Dundee City Council moving to a new headquarters; the long term financial viability of Tayside House was in doubt as early as 1997, when quotations of £7 million and £9 million were received to renovate the building and secure its future for 25 years. A quotation of £9 million was again received in 2003 to refurbish Tayside House and guarantee a 25-year life expectancy.

The initial plan to redevelop the area around Tayside House called for demolition to be complete by 2010; however, delays in the completion of the replacement building, Dundee House at 50 North Lindsay Street, prevented staff and services being moved out of Tayside House until August 2011. The demolition contract, worth £1.2 million, was let in August 2011 to Dundee-based demolition contractors Safedem.

Demolition work began at the end of 2011 with extensive asbestos removal works needed prior to deconstruction. Due to the risk of damage to a nearby railway tunnel, it had been decided not to use explosives to demolish Tayside House, but instead to take it down gradually. The physical deconstruction of Tayside House began in early 2012 with the demolition of the building linking Tayside House with the Caird Hall. Work to dismantle Tayside House itself started in November 2012; the main demolition phase was completed in July 2013 and the site cleared by the end of 2013.

== Viewpoints and demolition process ==
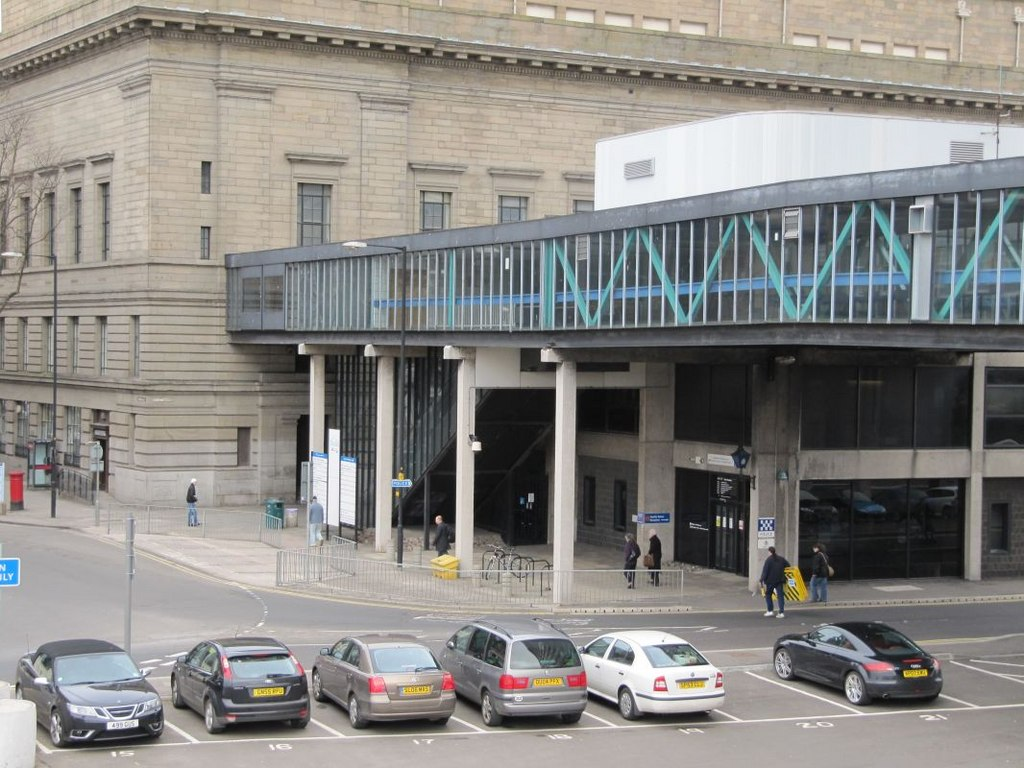
Adjacent "Podium" building attached to Tayside House via walkway. This included the main entrance via escalators.

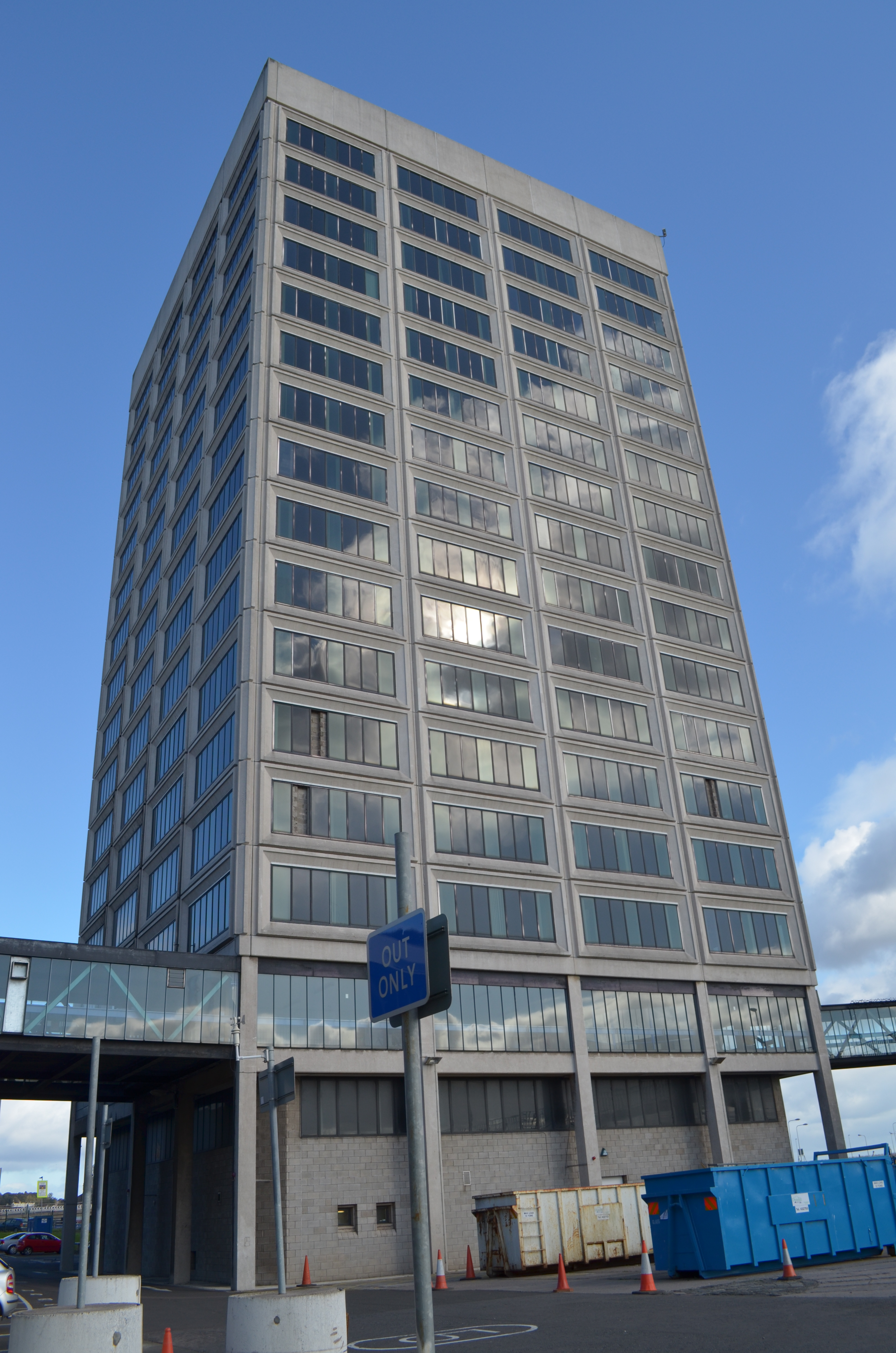
Northwest and southwest-facing sides

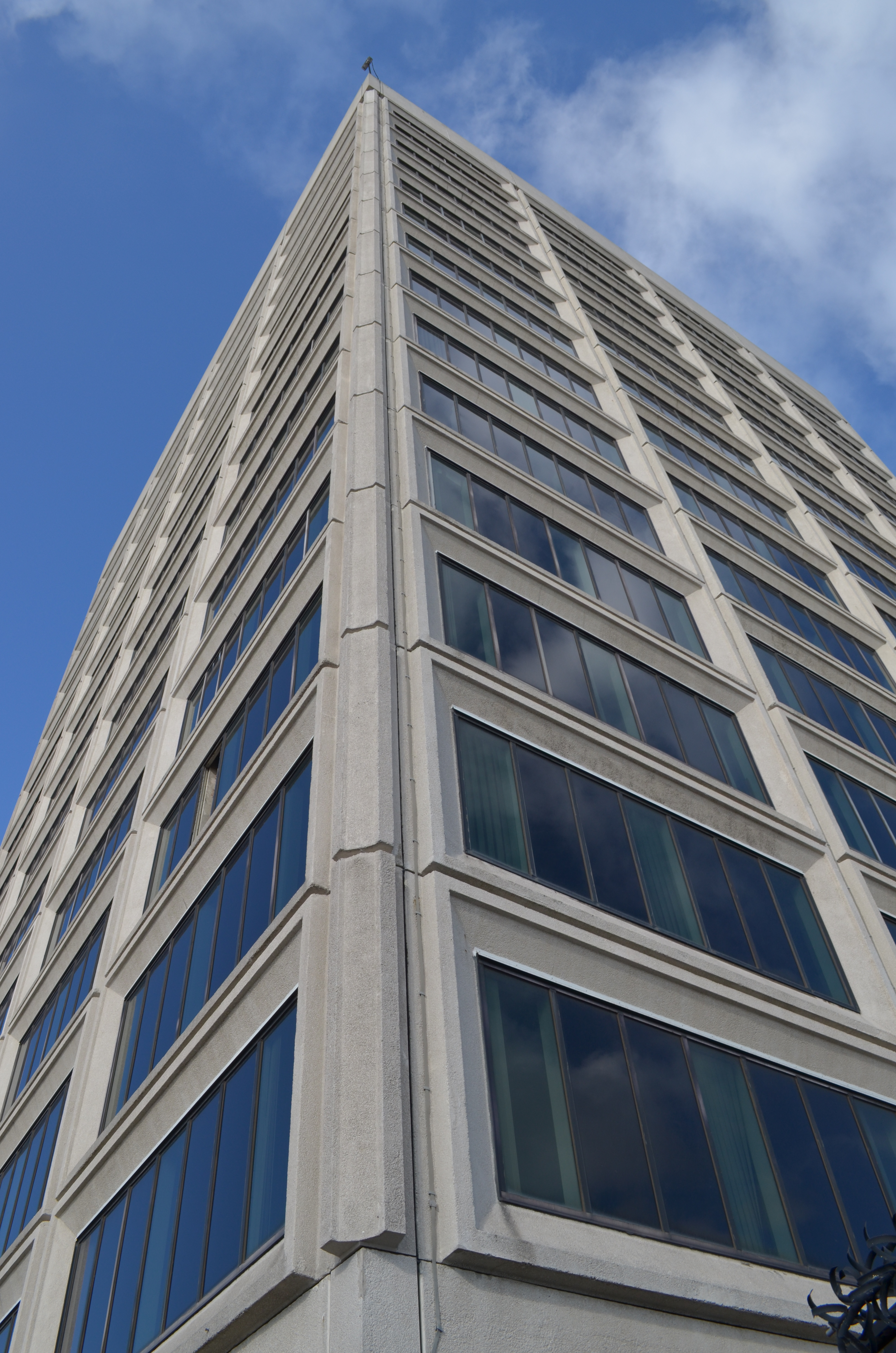
Close-up view including external panelling

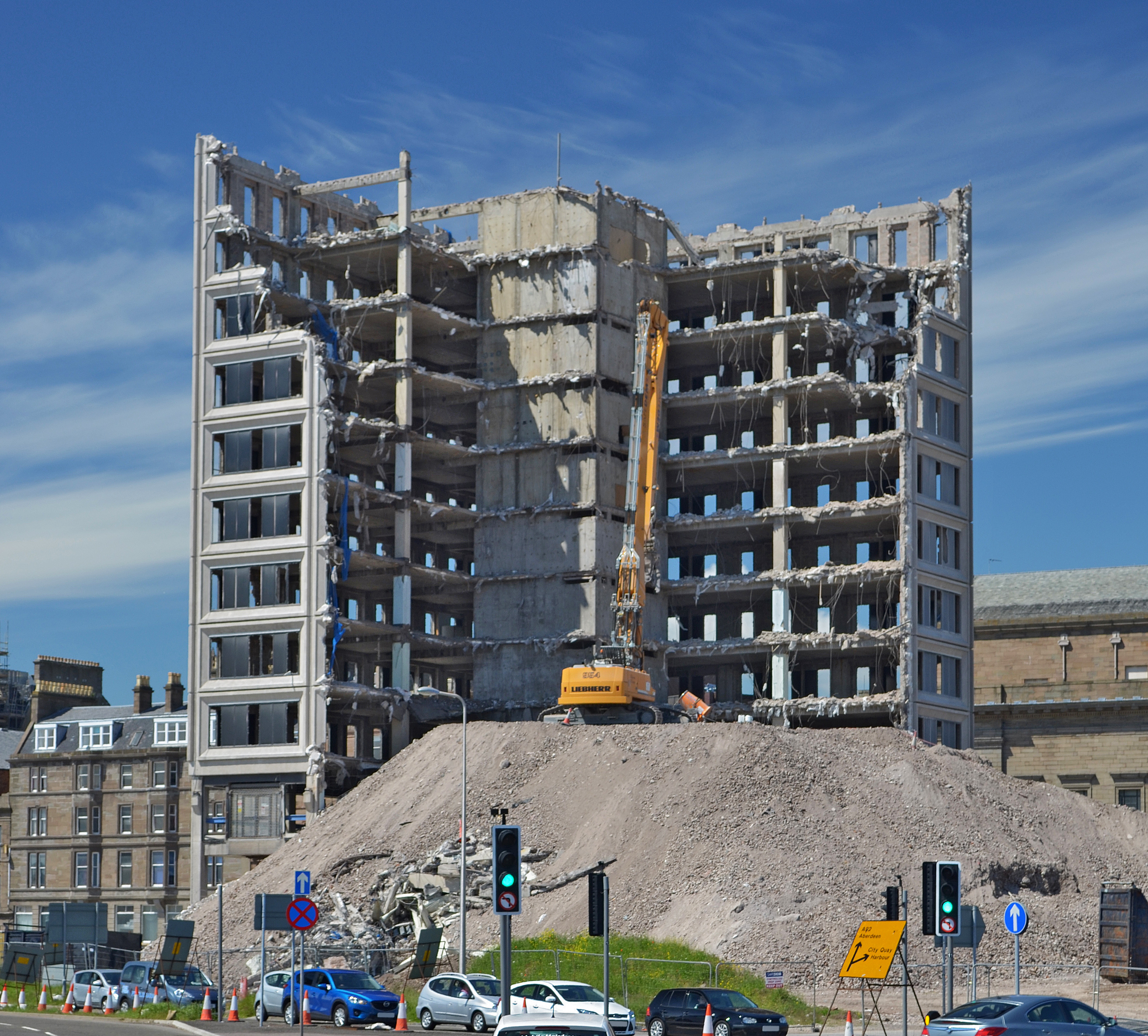
Final phase of demolition in mid-2013

Video of the demolition process
