= Tayside =

Former local government region of Scotland

Tayside Taobh Tatha
- Former region
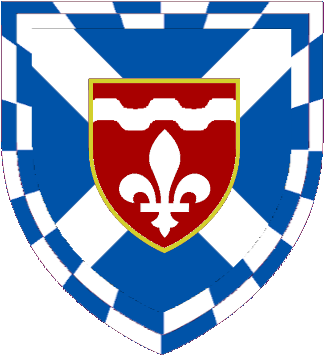
- Area
- 2,903 sq mi (7519 km^{2})
  - Coordinates: 56°42′N 3°44′W
- Population
  - 1981: 397,055
  - 1991: 392,500
  - 2019: 416,080 (estimate)
- History
  - Preceded by: Dundee Corporation; Perthshire County Council; Kinross-shire County Council; Angus County Council
  - Origin: Local Government (Scotland) Act 1973
  - Created: 16 May 1975
  - Abolished: 31 March 1996
  - Succeeded by: Dundee City Council; Perth & Kinross; Angus
- Government: Tayside Regional Council
  - Type: Regional council
  - HQ: Tayside House, Dundee
- Subdivisions
  - Type: Districts
  - Units: Angus, Dundee, Perth & Kinross

Tayside (Scottish Gaelic: Taobh Tatha) was one of the nine regions used for local government in Scotland from 16 May 1975 to 31 March 1996. The region was named after the River Tay.

== History ==
Tayside region was created in 1975 under the Local Government (Scotland) Act 1973, which established a two-tier structure of local government across mainland Scotland comprising upper-tier regions and lower-tier districts, following recommendations made by the 1969 Wheatley Report. Tayside region covered the whole area of the counties of Angus, Dundee (which was a county of a city), Kinross-shire and most of Perthshire. Tayside region was divided into three districts: Angus, Dundee, and Perth and Kinross.

Tayside region was abolished in 1996 under the Local Government etc. (Scotland) Act 1994, which replaced regions and districts with unitary council areas. Each of Tayside's three districts became a separate council area, with some adjustments to boundaries around Dundee.

Tayside Regional Council directly operated local bus services in the City of Dundee from 1975 until 1986, when bus deregulation under terms of the Transport Act 1985 was implemented. The restructured Tayside Buses became employee-owned in 1991, was sold to National Express in 1997 and McGill's Bus Services in 2020, and today trades as Xplore Dundee.

Tayside continues to have a joint electoral, valuation, and health board. It retained its police and fire services until they were merged, on 1 April 2013, into bodies known as Police Scotland and the Scottish Fire and Rescue Service, which cover the whole of Scotland. Provision of healthcare across the region also continues via NHS Tayside.

Angus Council, Dundee City Council and Perth and Kinross Council formed Tayside Contracts as their commercial arm and to provide shared services, such as road and housing maintenance, winter maintenance (snow clearing and gritting), catering and cleaning services across the former Tayside area. Tayside Contracts services are open to the public and all profits from the company are equally fed back into each of the three councils to bolster revenue to the local authorities to provide cash for services as a boost to central government and council tax income.

== Political control ==
The first election to the regional council was held in 1974, initially operating as a shadow authority alongside the outgoing authorities until it came into its powers on 16 May 1975. Political control of the council from 1975 was as follows:

Party in control	Years
No overall control	1975–1978
Conservative	1978–1986
No overall control	1986–1996

=== Leadership ===
The leaders of the council were:

Councillor	Party	From	To
Ian Mackie	Conservative	16 May 1975	May 1986
Ron Tosh	Labour	16 May 1986	23 Jun 1987
Chris Ward	Labour	23 Jun 1987	14 Dec 1989
Bill Derby	Labour	14 Dec 1989	May 1994
Lena Graham	SNP	13 May 1994	25 Jul 1994
Ewan Dow	SNP	25 Jul 1994	31 Mar 1996

=== Elections ===
Map of election results by year

Election results were as follows:

Year	Seats	SNP	Labour	Conservative	Liberal Democrats (Note: Includes Liberal and Social Democratic Party prior to 1988, with the two parties having formed the SDP–Liberal Alliance between 1981 and 1988.)	Independent / Other	Notes
1974	46	0	15	22	0	9	
1978	46	0	15	25	0	6	
1982	46	5	12	27	0	2	
1986	46	9	20	14	1	2	
1990	46	10	18	14	2	2	
1994	46	22	16	4	2	2	

== Premises ==
The regional council established its headquarters at Tayside House at 28 Crichton Street in Dundee. It was already under construction when the council was created, and the council started moving into the building in May 1976. After the regional council's abolition, ownership of the building passed to the three successor councils. Dundee City Council bought out the other two councils' interests in the building in 1997 and used it as its own offices until 2011, after which the building was demolished.

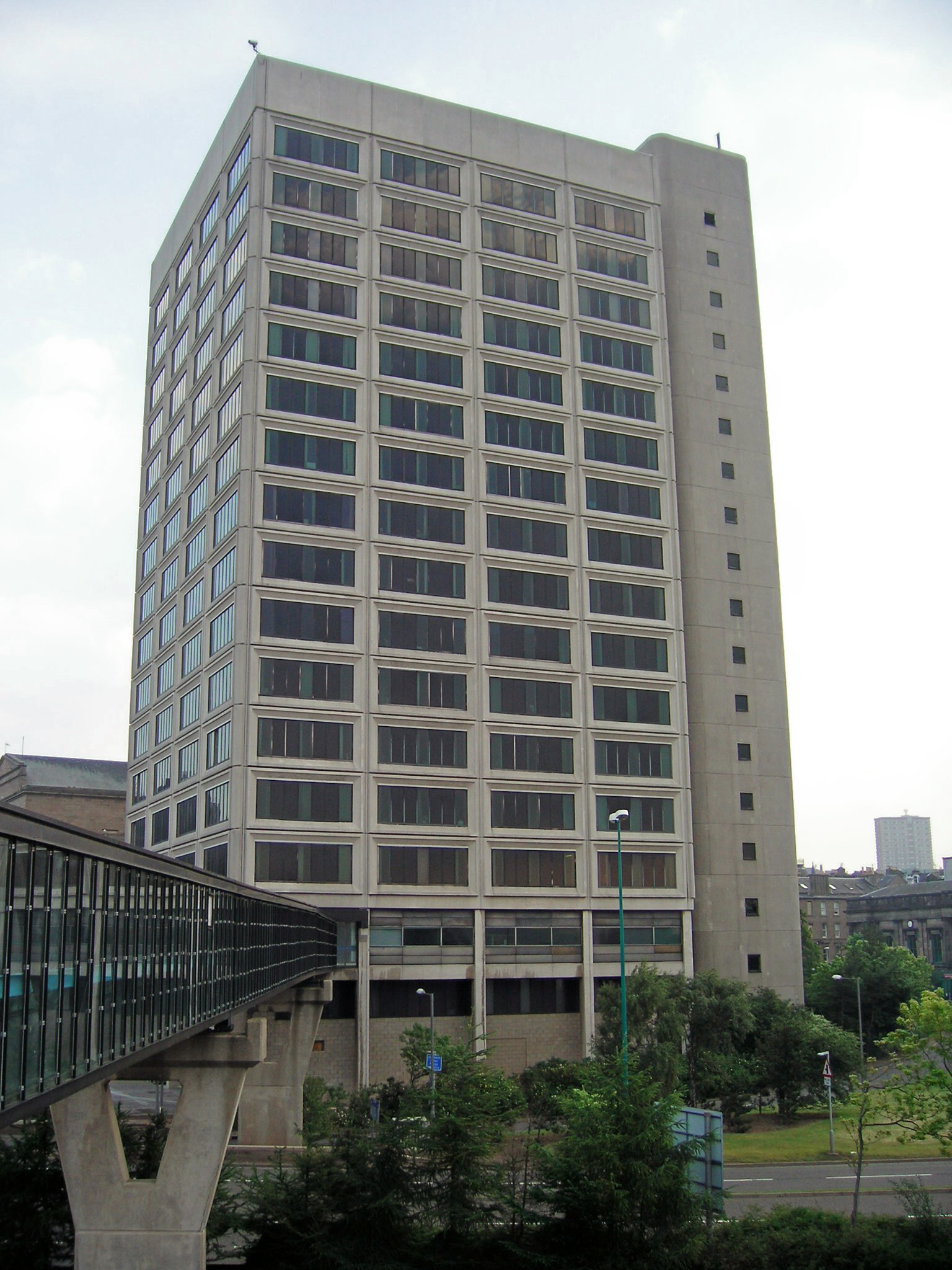
Tayside House
