= Helen Eadie =

Scottish politician (1947–2013)

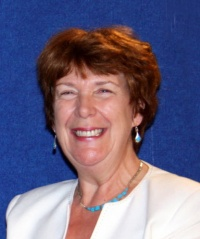
- Eadie in 2011

Deputy Convener of the Standards, Procedures and Public Appointments Committee
- In office 14 June 2011 – 9 November 2013
- Convener: Dave Thompson
- Preceded by: Marilyn Livingstone
- Succeeded by: Alex Rowley

Member of the Scottish Parliament for Cowdenbeath Dunfermline East (1999–2011)
- In office 6 May 1999 – 9 November 2013
- Preceded by: Constituency established
- Succeeded by: Alex Rowley

Personal details
- Born: Helen Stirling Eadie; 7 March 1947 Stenhousemuir, Scotland
- Died: 9 November 2013 (aged 66) Dunfermline, Fife, Scotland
- Party: Labour Co-operative
- Education: London School of Economics

Helen Stirling Eadie (7 March 1947 – 9 November 2013) was a Scottish Labour Co-operative politician who served as Member of the Scottish Parliament (MSP) for Cowdenbeath, previously Dunfermline East, from 1999 until her death in 2013.

== Early life ==
Helen Stirling Eadie was born in Stenhousemuir, near Falkirk. She attended Larbert Village School, Larbert High School and Falkirk Technical College before going on to read trade union studies at the London School of Economics.

Eadie was a member of Fife Regional Council before being elected the Scottish Parliament in 1999. At the 1997 general election, she contested the Roxburgh and Berwickshire constituency as the Labour candidate. She finished in third place, but increased her party's share of the vote to 15% from 8.8% in 1992.

== Member of the Scottish Parliament ==
When Labour was in power in the Scottish Executive, Eadie called for an end to tolls on the Forth Road Bridge.

After the May 2003 Scottish parliament election, Eadie strongly opposed the then Labour–Liberal Democrat coalition's agreed deal to introduce the single transferable vote (STV) proportional system for future local council elections. She said it was an example of "the tail wagging the dog" and "It's about one of the smallest parties in the parliament wanting to use the power that they have to try to force through issues that they want to see steamrollered through."

In November 2006, Eadie called for curfews against under-15 youths, after she was surrounded and trapped inside her car by a mob of youngsters who started rocking the car and throwing missiles at it.

She was a member of many Scottish Parliament committees, but in June 2007 resigned two of her committee posts in protest at a Tory MSP being given a convener-ship of the equal opportunities committee. Eadie said at the time, the move was like "putting Attila the Hun in charge of community care".

== Personal life ==
Eadie was married with two daughters. In 2013, it emerged she was being treated for cancer at the Queen Margaret Hospital, following diagnosis at the end of October. She died on 9 November 2013.
