= Inverkeithing and Dalgety Bay (ward) =

Electoral ward of Fife, Scotland

Location of the ward

Inverkeithing and Dalgety Bay is one of the 22 wards used to elect members of the Fife council. It elects three Councillors. The boundary covers the settlements of Inverkeithing, Hillend and Dalgety Bay.

== Councillors ==
Election	Councillors			
2007	Alice McGarry (SNP)	Bob Eadie (Labour)	Dave Dempsey (Conservative)	Dave Herbert (Liberal Democrats)
2012	Alice McGarry (SNP)	Lesley Laird (Labour)	Dave Dempsey (Conservative)	Gavin Yates (Labour)
2017	Alice McGarry (SNP)	Lesley Laird (Labour)	Dave Dempsey (Conservative)	David Barratt (SNP)
2018	Alice McGarry (SNP)	Dave Coleman (Conservative)	Dave Dempsey (Conservative)	David Barratt (SNP)
2022	Sarah Neal (SNP)	Patrick Browne (Labour)	Dave Dempsey (Conservative)	David Barratt (SNP)

== Election results ==
=== 2022 election ===
Inverkeithing and Dalgety Bay - 4 seats
Party	Candidate	FPv%	Count							
Party	Candidate	FPv%	1	2	3	4	5	6	7	8
SNP	David Barratt (incumbent)	28.4	2,187							
Labour	Patrick Browne	18.5	1,426	1,467	1,471	1,612				
Conservative	Dave Dempsey (incumbent)	17.6	1,355	1,380	1,401	1,446	1,456	1,494	1,519	2,430
Conservative	Dave Coleman (incumbent)	11.6	897	908	923	939	950	990	1,014	
SNP	Sarah Neal	10.4	802	1,262	1,273	1,296	1,302	1,763		
Green	Ryan Blackadder	8.2	634	709	728	791	807			
Liberal Democrats	Callum Hawthorne	4.0	309	316	329					
Scottish Family	Sarah Davis	1.2	93	95						
Electorate: 14,541 Valid: 7,703 Spoilt: 110 Quota: 1,541 Turnout: 53.7%

=== 2018 by-election ===
On 8 June 2018, Inverkeithing and Dalgety Bay Labour Councillor, Shadow Scottish Secretary, and Deputy Leader of Scottish Labour, Lesley Laird resigned her seat as she won the MP seat for Kirkcaldy and Cowdenbeath. A by-election was held on Thursday, 6 September 2018. The seat was won by Conservative candidate Dave Colman.

Inverkeithing and Dalgety Bay by-election (6 September 2018)
Party	Candidate	FPv%	Count						
Party	Candidate	FPv%	1	2	3	4	5	6	7
Conservative	Dave Coleman	37.3%	2,309	2,312	2,316	2,330	2,455	2,615	2,839
SNP	Neale Hanvey	28.1%	1,741	1,741	1,744	1,840	1,950	2,076	2,327
Labour	Billy Pollock	12.0%	744	746	747	794	867	1,058	
Liberal Democrats	Callum John Hawthorne	9.1%	566	568	573	631	738		
Independent	Peter Collins	8.4%	521	524	545	565			
Green	Mags Hall	4.2%	257	257	258				
Independent	Alastair Amundsen MacIntyre	0.6%	40	41					
Scottish Libertarian	Calum Paul	0.2%	13						
Electorate: 14,484 Valid: 6,191 Spoilt: 48 Quota: 3,096 Turnout: 6,239 (43.1%)

=== 2017 election ===
Inverkeithing and Dalgety Bay - 4 seats
Party	Candidate	FPv%	Count					
Party	Candidate	FPv%	1	2	3	4	5	6
Conservative	Dave Dempsey (incumbent)	36.6	2,841					
Labour	Lesley Laird (incumbent)†	16.8	1,305	1,620.09				
SNP	Alice McGarry (incumbent)	15.8	1,229	1,252.1	1,258.3	1,333.7	1,395.4	1,585.02
SNP	David Barratt	15	1,165	1,184.9	1,187.4	1,241.8	1,280.2	1,482.8
Independent	Helen Cannon-Todd	7.3	564	872.3	884.3	942.8	1,262.2	
Liberal Democrats	Callum Hawthorne	5	388	649.6	672.9	745.9		
Green	David Hansen	3.5	271	310.9	317.3			
Electorate: 14,398 Valid: 7,763 Spoilt: 59 Quota: 1,553 Turnout: 7,822 (54.3%)

=== 2012 election ===
Inverkeithing and Dalgety Bay - 4 seats
Party	Candidate	FPv%	Count					
Party	Candidate	FPv%	1	2	3	4	5	6
SNP	Alice McGarry (incumbent)	25.56	1,377					
Labour	Lesley Laird	17.82	960	978.7	991.1	1,060.5	1,061.6	1,197.8
Labour	Gavin Yates	16.28	877	888.7	899.2	1,025.2	1,026.3	1,241.3
Conservative	Dave Dempsey (incumbent)	15.44	832	843.1	930.7	1,085.2		
SNP	Helen Todd	12.29	662	891.5	918.6	1,000.8	1,001.8	
Liberal Democrats	Dave Walker *	9.23	497	506.3	522.6			
UKIP	Mike Arthur	3.38	182	185.5				
Electorate: 13,311 Valid: 5,387 Spoilt: 54 Quota: 1,078 Turnout: 5,441 (40.47%)

=== 2007 election ===
Inverkeithing and Dalgety Bay
Party	Candidate	FPv%	%	Seat	Count
SNP	Alice McGarry	2,172	29.5	1	1
Labour	Bob Eadie	1,510	20.5	2	1
Liberal Democrats	Dave Herbert	1,337	18.1	3	2
Conservative	Dave Dempsey	1,291	17.5	4	4
Labour	Jim Philp	512	6.9		
Green	Ian Sinclair	349	4.7		
UKIP	Chris Ashton	137	1.9		
Scottish Socialist	David Noble	60	0.8		
