= Ewan Dow =

British politician

- Born: 8 December 1971 (age 54); Dunfermline, Scotland
- Occupation: Politician
- Known for: Former Leader of Tayside Regional Council

Ewan Dow (born 8 December 1971, Dunfermline) is a former Scottish politician.

== Early life and education ==
He was educated at Kirkcaldy and Beath High Schools and attended the University of Aberdeen though left prior to graduating.

== Political career ==
In May 1994 he was elected as a Scottish National Party councillor to the former Tayside Regional Council and after only eight weeks was controversially appointed to be Leader of the Administration after the resignation of the previous leader, Councillor Lena Graham. In so doing Mr Dow made history as the youngest ever Scottish council leader since records began, being elected to this post at the age of 22 years.

In April 1995 Dow was elected to the newly formed Perth and Kinross Council and following the abolishment of Tayside Regional Council in 1996 served as depute leader and finance convener in the Perth and Kinross Council's SNP administration until losing his council seat in the 1999 Scottish local government elections. During that time Dow led the fight against both the then Conservative and subsequent Labour Governments for funding for the proposed multimillion-pound Perth Flood Prevention Scheme much to the ire of local Tory Member of Parliament for North Tayside Bill Walker.

In 1997 Dow stood for the SNP in the Stirling constituency against then Scottish Secretary of State Michael Forsyth coming third with 13.4% of the vote.

In 2004 Dow was elected to the SNP's National Disciplinary Committee being re-elected in 2005 and 2006 when he was appointed convener of the committee in succession to Lachie McNeill.

At the 2007 Scottish Parliament Election Dow stood for the SNP in the Dunfermline East constituency coming second with 28.5% of the vote an increase of 10.1% on the 2003 election and securing the highest vote share achieved by the SNP in the constituency.

During season 2008/09 Dow served on the board of Cowdenbeath Football Club in the joint role of club secretary and media officer.

In the 2011 Scottish Parliament Elections Dow was 8th on the SNP Regional List for Mid Scotland and Fife but failed to be elected.

Dow is a staunch republican and caused controversy in the late 1990s by referring to the British Royal Family as "Lizzie Windsor and the Spongers" during a debate on the monarchy at an SNP Annual Conference.

In 2016 Dow resigned from the SNP, criticising Cybernats and labelling the SNP as being like "a cult with selfies".
