= Mervyn Rolfe =

Scottish politician, activist and writer

Mervyn James Rolfe
- 1999 painting by Jennifer Anderson
- Born: July 1947
- Died: 28 February 2019 (aged 71)

Mervyn James "Merv" Rolfe CBE was a Scottish politician, activist and writer, who was Provost and Lord Lieutenant of the City of Dundee from 1996 to 1999. During this period he chaired the Dundee City of Discovery Campaign which launched the Dundee International Book Prize in 1996 and won the Scottish Marketing Awards Grand Prix in 1999 for promotion of the image of Dundee.

Rolfe also served as the Deputy Leader of both the Tayside Regional Council and Dundee City Council as well as holding various Convenerships. As Convener of Education for Tayside Region from 1986 to 1994, he doubled the provision of nursery places for under fives. He had been a member of the Angus and Dundee Tourist Board, Tayside Business Gateway and chair of the Dundee Partnership. As Chair of the Tay Road Bridge Joint Board from 1996 to 1999 he was responsible for providing disabled access to the bridge. He was awarded the CBE in 2000 for services to local government. He was Honorary Colonel to 2 (City of Dundee) Signal Sqn (Vol) from 2002 to 2010.

In 1992 he stood for the UK Parliament in the seat of Perth & Kinross for the Scottish Labour Party. From 1999 till 2014 he was Chair of ESEP Ltd, and taught Economics and Management at the University of Abertay Dundee. He was Vice Chair of the HMS Frigate Unicorn Preservation Society from 2002 to 2014 and had been a Trustee of Dundee Heritage Trust from 1986 to 1996. He was previously Convener of the Scottish Police Services Authority, an executive member of the Convention of Scottish Local Authorities, an executive member of the Campaign for a Scottish Assembly, a Court member of the University of Dundee, member of the General Teaching Council of Scotland and a Director of Scottish Enterprise Tayside. During his time on Dundee University Court he led the successful campaigns to keep Dundee Dental School open and to retain teacher education provision in Dundee. He served as a Justice of the Peace for the City of Dundee from 1988 to 2000. He was an executive member of the North Sea Commission of the Committee for Peripheral Maritime Regions of the European Union from 1994 to 1996.

He co-authored a history of the University of Dundee, Dundee a Celebration (2007). He was a founding member of the Arab Trust, a supporters organisation for Dundee United F.C.

He gained a Master of Education Hons 2(I) in 1995 from University of Dundee and a Master of Science from University of Abertay Dundee in 1999.

Rolfe died on 28 February 2019, aged 71.
