= 1986 Tayside Regional Council election =

Fourth election to Tayside Regional Council

Interactive map of results in the 46 Tayside electoral divisions

The fourth election to Tayside Regional Council was held on 8 May 1986 as part of the wider 1986 Scottish regional elections. The election saw the Conservatives losing control of the region, with Labour emerging as the single largest force on the 46 seat council. Following the election the Labour Party formed a minority administration. Ian Mackie CBE, the chair of the Conservative Group, was defeated in Clepington-Maryfield ward.

Voter turnout was 44.33%.

== Results ==
1986 Tayside Regional Council election result
| Party | Seats | Gains | Losses | Net gain/loss | Seats % | Votes % | Votes | +/− |
|---|---|---|---|---|---|---|---|---|
| Labour | 20 | | | ▲8 | 43.5 | 28.0 | | |
| Conservative | 14 | | | ▼13 | 30.4 | 29.1 | | |
| SNP | 9 | | | ▲4 | 19.6 | 40.8 | | |
| Independent | 2 | | | Steady | 4.3 | 0.0 | | |
| Alliance | 1 | | | ▲1 | 2.2 | 2.1 | | |
