= Dunfermline East (Scottish Parliament constituency) =

Region or constituency of the Scottish Parliament

- Former burgh constituency for the Scottish Parliament
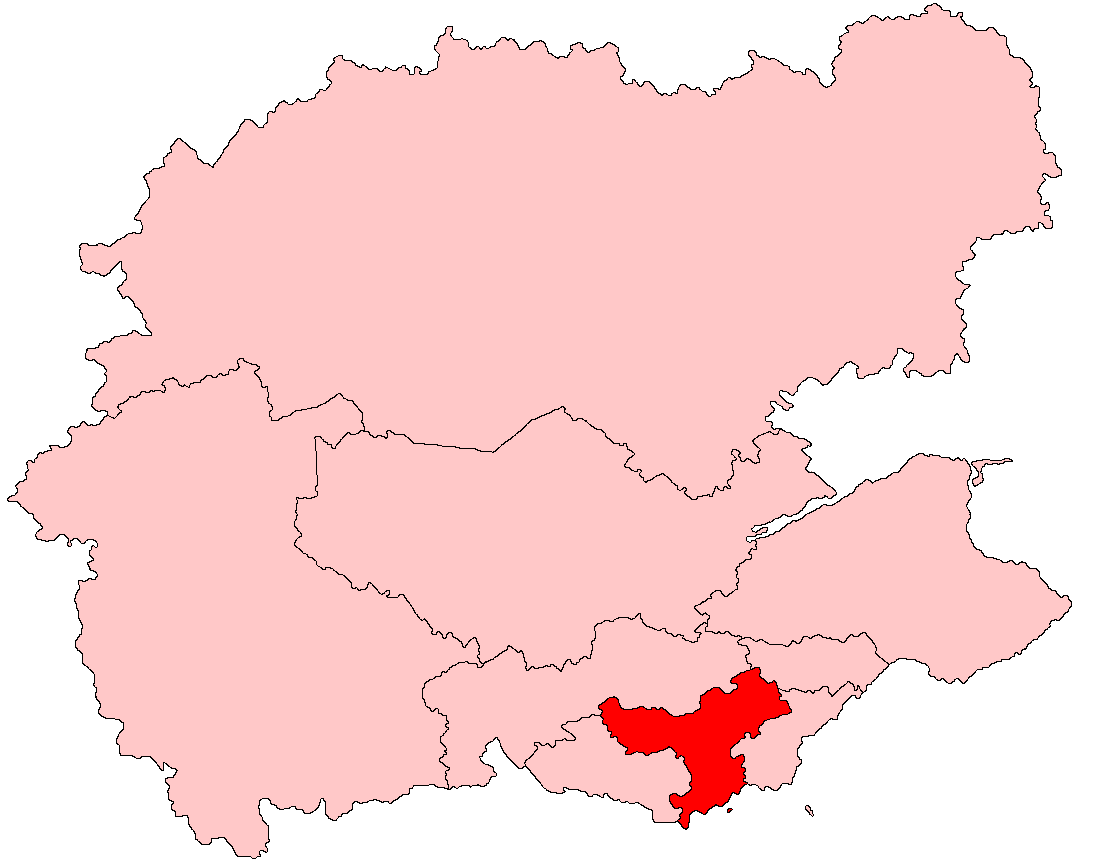

- Dunfermline East shown within the Mid Scotland and Fife electoral region and the region shown within Scotland

Former constituency
- Created: 1999
- Abolished: 2011
- Council area: Fife

Dunfermline East was a constituency of the Scottish Parliament (Holyrood). It elected one Member of the Scottish Parliament (MSP) by the plurality (first past the post) method of election. It was abolished from the 2011 Scottish Parliament election, with parts of the constituency being merged with the old Dunfermline West seat to form a single Dunfermline constituency, while a new constituency of Cowdenbeath was created from the remaining area.

== Electoral region ==
The region covered all of the Clackmannanshire council area, all of the Fife council area, all of the Perth and Kinross council area, all of the Stirling council area and parts of the Angus council area.

== Constituency boundaries and council area ==
The constituency was created at the same time as the Scottish Parliament, in 1999, with the name and boundaries of a pre-existing Westminster (House of Commons) constituency. In 2005, however, Scottish Westminster constituencies were mostly replaced with new constituencies. The Dunfermline East Westminster constituency was divided between Dunfermline and West Fife and Kirkcaldy and Cowdenbeath.

The Holyrood constituency of Dunfermline East was one of five Mid Scotland and Fife constituencies covering the Fife council area, the others being Dunfermline West, Fife Central, Fife North East and Kirkcaldy. All were entirely within the council area.

Dunfermline East covered a south-western portion of the council area, with Dunfermline West to the west, Fife Central to the northeast and Kirkcaldy to the east.

== Constituency profile ==
The constituency contains no part of the town of Dunfermline, which is within the Dunfermline West constituency. (The pre-existing Westminster constituency was created during the period, 1975 to 1996, of local government regions and districts, when there was Dunfermline district of the Fife local government region. In 1996, regions and districts were replaced with unitary council areas.) Cowdenbeath was the largest town in the constituency, and most of the constituency area was once part of the Fife coalfield, on the north bank of the Firth of Forth. The region has economic troubles, and the closure of the Rosyth naval base and the troubles at the naval dockyard have not helped.

Statistically, this was one of Labour’s safest seats in Scotland. In the House of Commons, there had been a Labour Member of Parliament (MP) for the area since 1950. Gordon Brown, the former prime minister, was MP for the Dunfermline East Westminster constituency from 1983 to 2005. He was subsequently MP for the Kirkcaldy and Cowdenbeath constituency, where his majority at the 2010 general election was over 15,000.

== Member of the Scottish Parliament ==
Election	Member	Party
1999	Helen Eadie	Labour
2011	Constituency abolished; see Cowdenbeath and Dunfermline	

== Election results ==
2007 Scottish Parliament election: Dunfermline East
Party	Candidate	Votes	%	±%
Labour	Helen Eadie	10,995	44.8	−5.1
SNP	Ewan Dow	7,002	28.5	+10.1
Conservative	Graeme Brown	3,718	15.1	+4.4
Liberal Democrats	Karen Utting	2,853	11.6	+5.4
Majority		3,993	16.3	−15.2
Turnout		24,568	48.1	+2.9
Labour hold		Swing	-7.6	

2003 Scottish Parliament election: Dunfermline East
Party	Candidate	Votes	%	±%
Labour	Helen Eadie	11,552	49.9	−6.0
SNP	Janet Law	4,262	18.4	−8.2
Conservative	Stuart Randall	2,485	10.7	+0.8
Independent Campaign for Local Hospital Services	Brian Walker Stewart	1,890	8.2	New
Scottish Socialist	Linda Graham	1,537	6.6	New
Liberal Democrats	Rodger Spillane	1,428	6.2	−1.5
Majority		7,290	31.5	+2.2
Turnout		23,154	45.2	
Labour hold		Swing	+15.8	

1999 Scottish Parliament election: Dunfermline East
Party	Candidate	Votes	%	±%
Labour	Helen Eadie	16,574	55.89	N/A
SNP	David McCarthy	7,877	26.56	N/A
Conservative	Carrie Ruxton	2,931	9.88	N/A
Liberal Democrats	Fred Lawson	2,276	7.67	N/A
Majority		8,697	29.33	N/A
Turnout		29,658		N/A
Labour win (new seat)				

== See also ==
- Dunfermline East (UK Parliament constituency)
