= Dumfries and Galloway Council elections =

Local government elections in Dumfries and Galloway, Scotland

Dumfries and Galloway Council in Scotland holds elections every five years, previously holding them every four years from its creation as a single-tier authority in 1995 to 2007.

== Council elections ==
=== As a regional council ===
Year	Conservative	SNP	Labour	Liberal (Note: SDP–Liberal Alliance from 1981 to 1988, Liberal Democrats from 1988.)	Independent
1974	0	0	2	0	33
1978	5	1	2	0	27
1982	4	3	4	2	22
1986 (Note: New ward boundaries.)	0	5	7	4	19
1990	0	4	10	2	19 (Note: Includes 1 Independent Labour.)
1994	3	3	11	6	12

=== As a unitary authority ===
Year	Conservative	SNP	Labour	Liberal Democrats	Independent
1995	2	9	21	10	28
1999 (Note: New ward boundaries.)	8	5	14	6	14 (Note: Includes 1 Independent Labour.)
2003	11	5	14	5	12
2007 (Note: Change to single transferable vote system and new ward boundaries.)	18	10	14	3	2
2012	14	10	15	1	7
2017 (Note: New ward boundaries.)	16	11	11	1	4
2022	16	11	9	1	6

== Results maps ==
1999 results map

2003 results map

2012 results map

2017 results map

2022 results map

== By-elections ==
=== 2003-2007 ===
Hoddom and Kinmount By-Election 10 June 2004
Party	Candidate	Votes	%	±%
Conservative		653	63.1	−7.1
Labour		138	13.3	−1.4
Liberal Democrats		122	11.8	−3.4
Independent		56	5.4	+5.4
SNP		44	4.3	+4.3
Scottish Socialist		22	2.1	+2.1
Majority		515	49.8	
Turnout		1,035		
Conservative hold				

Moffat By-Election 10 June 2004
Party	Candidate	Votes	%	±%
Conservative		590	41.0	+1.0
Independent		558	38.8	+38.8
Labour		189	13.1	−0.7
SNP		73	5.1	−10.0
Scottish Socialist		30	2.1	+2.1
Majority		32	2.2	
Turnout		1,440		
Conservative hold				

Lochside By-Election 13 October 2005
Party	Candidate	Votes	%	±%
Labour		676	76.4	+37.7
Independent		89	10.1	+10.1
SNP		73	6.3	−6.5
Scottish Socialist		41	4.6	+4.6
Independent		17	1.9	+1.9
Conservative		6	0.7	−2.1
Majority		587	66.3	
Turnout		885		
Labour gain from Independent				

=== 2007-2012 ===
Abbey By-Election 1 May 2008
Party	Candidate	FPv%	Count			
Party	Candidate	FPv%	1	2	3	4
Conservative	Michael Thomson	40.08	1,713	1,749	1,804	2,006
Labour	Tom McAughtrie	33.18	1,393	1,418	1,471	1,712
SNP	John McNaught	17.98	755	785	833	
Independent	Graham McLeod	4.1	173	216		
Liberal Democrats	Keith Mycock	3.9	164			
Conservative hold						
Valid: 4,224 Spoilt: 26 Quota: 2,100 Turnout: 4,250

Abbey By-Election 16 June 2011
Party	Candidate	FPv%	Count	
Party	Candidate	FPv%	1	2
Labour	Tom McAughtrie	38.2	1,196	1,448
Conservative	Kath Lord	39.5	1,236	1,391
SNP	Yowann Byghan	21.7	678	
Labour gain from Conservative				
Valid: 3,132 Spoilt: 22 Quota: 1,566 Turnout: 3,154

=== 2012-2017 ===
Annandale North By-Election 15 November 2012
Party	Candidate	FPv%	Count			
Party	Candidate	FPv%	1	2	3	4
Conservative	Graeme Tait	46.0	1,819	1,857	1,922	1,980
Labour	Peter Glanton	25.3	1,002	1,008	1,053	1,149
Green	Alis Ballance	11.7	464	475	508	617
SNP	Frank MacGregor	9.4	371	375	399	
Liberal Democrats	Hugh Young	5.3	208	211		
UKIP	Bill Wright	2.3	89			
Conservative gain from Labour						
Valid: 3,953 Spoilt: 27 Quota: 1,977 Turnout: 3,980

Annandale North By-Election 17 November 2016
Party	Candidate	FPv%	Count
Party	Candidate	FPv%	1
Conservative	Douglas Fairbairn	57.4	2,041
SNP	Sylvia Moffat	21.1	749
Labour	Adam Wilson	17.2	611
Green	Chris Ballance	4.3	152
Conservative hold			
Valid: 3,553 Spoilt: 35 Quota: 1,777 Turnout: 3,588

=== 2017-2022 ===
Dee and Glenkens By-Election 13 December 2018
Party	Candidate	FPv%	Count			
Party	Candidate	FPv%	1	2	3	4
Conservative	Pauline Drysdale	45.9	1,682	1,704	1,740	1,956
SNP	Glen Murray	28.0	1,024	1,026	1,183	1,357
Independent	Colin Wyper	15.5	569	575	651	
Green	Laura Elizabeth Moodie	9.3	342	349		
UKIP	Jennifer Blue	1.3	42			
Conservative hold						
Valid: 3,663 Spoilt: 29 Quota: 1,832 Turnout: 3,692

Mid Galloway and Wigtown West By-Election 23 January 2020
Party	Candidate	FPv%	Count
Party	Candidate	FPv%	1
Conservative	Jackie McCamon	61.8	2,177
SNP	Tony Berretti	25.5	898
Green	Peter Barlow	6.4	225
Labour	Gill Hay	6.3	220
Conservative hold			
Valid: 3,520 Spoilt: 17 Quota: 1,761 Turnout: 3,537

=== 2022-2027 ===
Mid Galloway and Wigtown West By-Election 8 December 2022
Party	Candidate	FPv%	Count
Party	Candidate	FPv%	1
Conservative	Richard Marsh	52.9	1,787
SNP	Ian Gibson	26.0	879
Labour	John Peter McCutcheon	9.6	326
Liberal Democrats	Iain McDonald	5.6	190
Green	Daniel Hooper-Jones	5.1	172
Conservative gain from Labour			
Valid: 3,354 Spoilt: 26 Quota: 1,678 Turnout: 3,380

Stranraer and the Rhins By-Election 20 November 2025
Party	Candidate	FPv%	Count						
Party	Candidate	FPv%	1	2	3	4	5	6	7
Conservative	Julie Currie	33.1	1,302	1,305	1,321	1,330	1,375	1,417	1,565
Reform	John Roberts	35.2	1,386	1,391	1,399	1,403	1,429	1,455	1,523
SNP	Simon Jones	13.7	541	545	554	612	659	730	
Labour	John Peter McCutcheon	6.1	239	242	258	283	311		
Independent	Shaun Smith	5.3	207	208	220	239			
Green	Michael Harvard	3.6	141	142	158				
Liberal Democrats	Tracey Warman	2.4	96	98					
Heritage	Gisele Skinner	0.7	27						
Conservative gain from Independent									
Valid: 3,939 Spoilt: 29 Quota: 1,971 Turnout: 3,968
