= Castle Douglas and Crocketford (ward) =

Electoral ward in Scotland

- Dumfries and Galloway
- Boundary of Castle Douglas and Crocketford in Dumfries and Galloway from 2017.
- Population: 8,632 (2021)
- Electorate: 7,751 (2022)
- Major settlements: Castle Douglas
- Scottish Parliament constituency: Galloway and West Dumfries
- Scottish Parliament region: South Scotland
- UK Parliament constituency: Dumfries and Galloway

Current ward
- Created: 2017
- Number of councillors: 3
- Councillor: Pauline Drysdale (Conservative)
- Councillor: John Young (SNP)
- Councillor: Ian Howie (Independent)
- Created from: Abbey; Castle Douglas and Glenkens

Castle Douglas and Crocketford is one of the twelve electoral wards of Dumfries and Galloway Council. Created in 2017, the ward elects three councillors using the single transferable vote electoral system and covers an area with a population of 8,632 people.

The area has produced strong results for the Conservatives who have taken one seat and at least 35 per cent of the vote at each election.

== Boundaries ==
The ward was created by the Local Government Boundary Commission for Scotland following the Fifth Statutory Reviews of Electoral Arrangements ahead of the 2017 Scottish local elections. Five of the 13 multi-member wards in Dumfries and Galloway were abolished as a result of the review and replaced by four new ones. Castle Douglas and Crocketford encompasses an area represented by the former Castle Douglas and Glenkens ward and an area that was previously part of the Abbey ward on the Solway Firth coast in the Irish Sea at the mouth of the Urr Water. The ward takes in a central southern area of Dumfries and Galloway. It is situated within Galloway and takes in part of the historic county of Kirkcudbrightshire between the Dee and Glenkens, Mid and Upper Nithsdale, Lochar, North West Dumfries and Abbey wards. The ward takes its name from the two principal settlements within it – Castle Douglas and Crocketford. It includes the villages of Terregles, Crossmichael, Corsock, Kirkpatrick Durham, Springholm, Haugh of Urr, Beeswing, Kirkgunzeon and Palnackie.

== Councillors ==
Election	Councillors		
2017	David James (Conservative)	Ian Howie (Ind.)	John Young (SNP)
2022	Pauline Drysdale (Conservative)	Ian Howie (Ind.)	John Young (SNP)

== Election results ==
=== 2022 election ===
Castle Douglas and Crocketford - 3 seats
Party	Candidate	FPv%	Count							
Party	Candidate	FPv%	1	2	3	4	5	6	7	8
Conservative	Pauline Drysdale	30.2	1,220							
SNP	John Young (incumbent)	25.1	1,012							
Independent	Iain Howie (incumbent)	10.0	403	425	425	468	521	582	827	1,115
Independent	Gill Dykes	9.6	386	409	409	432	463	550		
Liberal Democrats	Iain McDonald	7.8	313	329	329	382	495	553	633	
Green	Liz Ashburn	6.0	243	244	245					
Labour	Keith Heron	6.0	241	246	247	316				
Conservative	Iain Kennedy-Moffat	5.3	215	341	341	349	361			
Electorate: 7,751 Valid: 4,033 Spoilt: 59 Quota: 1,009 Turnout: 52.8%

=== 2017 election ===
2017 Dumfries and Galloway Council election

Castle Douglas and Crocketford - 3 seats
Party	Candidate	FPv%	Count					
Party	Candidate	FPv%	1	2	3	4	5	6
Conservative	David James†††	35.79	1,346					
Independent	Iain Howie	23.96	901	1,033.99				
SNP	John Young	20.10	756	761.72	772.23	837.81	928.28	1,099.88
Independent	George Nicol Prentice (incumbent)	9.70	365	451.66	496.45	522.15	628.9	
Labour	Lucy McKie	7.02	264	307.03	316.87	354.5		
Green	Paul Taylorson	3.43	129	147.66	155.77			
Electorate: 7,433 Valid: 3,761 Spoilt: 41 Quota: 941 Turnout: 50.6
