= Annandale East and Eskdale (ward) =

Electoral ward in Dumfries and Galloway, Scotland

- Dumfries and Galloway
- Boundary of Annandale East and Eskdale in Dumfries and Galloway from 2017.
- Population: 9,963 (2021)
- Electorate: 8,699 (2022)
- Major settlements: Langholm
- Scottish Parliament constituency: Dumfriesshire
- Scottish Parliament region: South Scotland
- UK Parliament constituency: Dumfriesshire, Clydesdale and Tweeddale

Current ward
- Created: 2007
- Number of councillors: 3
- Councillor: Karen Carruthers (Conservative)
- Councillor: Archie Dryburgh (Labour)
- Councillor: Denis Male (Independent)
- Created from: Canonbie and Kirtle; Chapelcross; Dryfe and Lockerbie East; Hoddom and Kinmount; Langholm and Upper Eskdale; Solway Border

Annandale East and Eskdale is one of the thirteen wards used to elect members of the Dumfries and Galloway Council. It elects three Councillors.

== Councillors ==
Election	Councillors			
2007	Denis Male (Conservative)	Ian Lindsay (Conservative)	Archie Dryburgh (Labour)	Allan Graham (Conservative)
2012	Denis Male (Conservative)	Karen Carruthers (Conservative)	Archie Dryburgh (Labour)	Craig Peacock (Ind.)
2017	Ronnie Tait (Conservative)	Karen Carruthers (Conservative)	Archie Dryburgh (Labour)	
2022	Denis Male (Ind.)	Karen Carruthers (Conservative)	Archie Dryburgh (Labour)	

== Election results ==
=== 2022 election ===
Annandale East and Eskdale - 3 seats
Party	Candidate	FPv%	Count						
Party	Candidate	FPv%	1	2	3	4	5	6	7
Conservative	Karen Carruthers (incumbent)	27.7	1,140						
Labour	Archie Dryburgh (incumbent)	21.4	880	888	908	973	1,260		
Independent	Denis Male	15.4	633	639	649	687	724	875	1,190
Conservative	Ron Tait (incumbent)	14.9	614	693	699	712	724	751	
SNP	Sylvia Willmot	14.5	597	597	640	660			
Liberal Democrats	Kirsten Herbst-Gray	3.3	137	141	159				
Scottish Green	Stephen Mattock	2.6	107	108					
Electorate: 8,699 Valid: 4,108 Spoilt: 82 Quota: 1,028 Turnout: 48.2%

=== 2017 election ===
2017 Dumfries and Galloway Council election

Annandale East and Eskdale - 3 seats
Party	Candidate	FPv%	Count				
Party	Candidate	FPv%	1	2	3	4	5
Conservative	Karen Carruthers (incumbent)	29.59	1,290				
Conservative	Ronnie Tait	17.06	744	881.45	901.22	983.92	1,266.4
No description	Denis Raymond Male (incumbent)	16.54	721	732.42	809.57	934.96	
Labour	Archie Dryburgh (incumbent)	14.63	638	652.04	776.35	1,029.74	1,362.05
Independent	Craig Peacock(incumbent)	11.77	513	529.2	630.51		
SNP	Sylvia Moffat	10.41	454	455.85			
Electorate: 8,466 Valid: 4,360 Spoilt: 65 Quota: 1,091 Turnout: 51.5

=== 2012 election ===
2012 Dumfries and Galloway Council election

Annandale East and Eskdale - 4 seats
Party	Candidate	FPv%	Count							
Party	Candidate	FPv%	1	2	3	4	5	6	7	8
Labour	Archie Dryburgh (incumbent)	22.20	877							
Conservative	Denis Raymond Male (incumbent)	15.29	604	609.8	609.8	618.9	732.3	778.3	778.9	963.2
Independent	Craig Peacock	14.98	592	607.3	621.9	654.9	716.8	797.1		
Conservative	Karen Carruthers††	13.92	550	554.8	554.8	560.8	661.2	690.9	691.6	808.4
Liberal Democrats	Jock Dinwoodie	11.69	462	473.8	479.5	483.7	513.4	587.8	588.9	
SNP	Brian Richardson	10.66	421	430.2	434.4	436.8	447			
Conservative	Stuart Thompson	8.88	351	353.3	356.6	363.9				
Independent	Allan Graham (incumbent)	1.24	49	52.2	68.8					
Independent	Sidney John Elder	1.14	45	50.2						
Electorate: 9,663 Valid: 3,951 Spoilt: 36 Quota: 791 Turnout: 4,348 (40.89%)

=== 2007 election ===
2007 Dumfries and Galloway Council election

Annandale East
Party	Candidate	FPv%	Count						
Party	Candidate	FPv%	1	2	3	4	5	6	7
Conservative	Denis Raymond Male	20.6	992						
Conservative	Ian Lindsay	20.4	981						
Labour	Archie Dryburgh	17.3	835	835.88	836.63	879.83	997.11		
Conservative	Allan Graham	15.8	761	777.19	788.38	816.71	873.51	877.49	1,069.86
SNP	Murray Collins	12.9	619	622.39	623.64	667.93	776.26	784.66	
Liberal Democrats	Peter James Burn	7.6	368	369.46	370.49	448.63			
Scottish Green	Nicholas John Jennings	5.3	257	258.55	259.15				
Electorate: 9,629 Valid: 4,813 Spoilt: 66 Quota: 963 Turnout: 50.7%
