= Mid and Upper Nithsdale (ward) =

Electoral ward in Dumfries and Galloway, Scotland

- Dumfries and Galloway
- Boundary of Mid and Upper Nithsdale in Dumfries and Galloway from 2017.
- Population: 10,448 (2021)
- Electorate: 8,242 (2022)
- Major settlements: Sanquhar
- Scottish Parliament constituency: Dumfriesshire
- Scottish Parliament region: South Scotland
- UK Parliament constituency: Dumfriesshire, Clydesdale and Tweeddale; Dumfries and Galloway

Current ward
- Created: 2007
- Number of councillors: 3
- Councillor: Tony Berretti (SNP)
- Councillor: Jim H. Dempster (Independent)
- Councillor: Andrew S. Wood (Conservative)
- Created from: Cairn Valley; Kirkconnel; Lochar; Mid Nithsdale; Sanquhar and District

Mid and Upper Nithsdale is one of the thirteen wards used to elect members of the Dumfries and Galloway Council. It elects three Councillors.

== Councillors ==
| Year | Councillors | | | |
|---|---|---|---|---|
| 2007 | Jim Dempster (Labour/ Ind.) | Gill Dykes (Conservative) | Andrew Wood (SNP/ Conservative) | John Syme (Labour) |
| 2012 | Jim Dempster (Labour/ Ind.) | Gill Dykes (Conservative) | Andrew Wood (SNP/ Conservative) | John Syme (Labour) |
| 2017 | Jim Dempster (Labour/ Ind.) | Matthew Ronnie (Conservative) | Andrew Wood (SNP/ Conservative) | |
| 2020 | Jim Dempster (Labour/ Ind.) | Matthew Ronnie (Conservative) | Andrew Wood (SNP/ Conservative) | |
| 2022 | Jim Dempster (Labour/ Ind.) | Tony Berretti (SNP) | Andrew Wood (SNP/ Conservative) | |

== Election results ==
=== 2022 election ===
Mid and Upper Nithsdale - 3 seats
| Party | Candidate | FPv% | Count | | | |
| Party | Candidate | FPv% | 1 | 2 | 3 | 4 |
|---|---|---|---|---|---|---|
| SNP | Tony Berretti | 29.2 | 1,161 | | | |
| Independent | Jim H. Dempster (incumbent) | 27.4 | 1,087 | | | |
| Conservative | Andrew S. Wood (incumbent) | 15.8 | 629 | 631 | 642 | 1,139 |
| Conservative | Kyle Thornton | 14.8 | 591 | 596 | 612 | |
| Labour | Callum Jamieson | 12.7 | 504 | 595 | 630 | 664 |
Electorate: 8,242 Valid: 3,972 Spoilt: 46 Quota: 994 Turnout: 48.8%

=== 2017 election ===
2017 Dumfries and Galloway Council election

Mid and Upper Nithsdale - 3 seats
| Party | Candidate | FPv% | Count | | | | |
| Party | Candidate | FPv% | 1 | 2 | 3 | 4 | 5 |
|---|---|---|---|---|---|---|---|
| Conservative | Matthew Ronnie | 27.98 | 1,211 | | | | |
| Labour | Jim Dempster (incumbent) | 24.38 | 1,055 | 1,087.55 | | | |
| SNP | Andrew Stuart Wood (incumbent)†††† | 20.15 | 872 | 876.65 | 876.96 | 1,043.9 | 1,286.21 |
| Labour | John Syme (incumbent) | 16.73 | 724 | 730.76 | 734.26 | 839.41 | |
| No description | Graham Watson | 10.77 | 466 | 497.92 | 498.1 | | |
Electorate: 8,105 Valid: 4,328 Spoilt: 50 Quota: 1,083 Turnout: 53.4

=== 2012 Election ===
2012 Dumfries and Galloway Council election

Mid and Upper Nithsdale - 4 seats
| Party | Candidate | FPv% | Count | |
| Party | Candidate | FPv% | 1 | 2 |
|---|---|---|---|---|
| Labour | Jim Dempster (incumbent) | 27.45 | 1,194 | |
| Conservative | Gill Dykes (incumbent) | 26.53 | 1,154 | |
| SNP | Andrew Stuart Wood (incumbent) | 20.51 | 892 | |
| Labour | John Syme (incumbent) | 19.08 | 830 | 1,098.6 |
| UKIP | Douglas Watters | 4.55 | 198 | 209.1 |
| Conservative | Elly Hurren | 1.86 | 81 | 88.3 |
Electorate: 9,239 Valid: 4,349 Spoilt: 67 Quota: 870 Turnout: 4,416 (47.07%)

=== 2007 Election ===
2007 Dumfries and Galloway Council election

Mid and Upper Nithsdale
| Party | Candidate | FPv% | Count | | | | | | | |
| Party | Candidate | FPv% | 1 | 2 | 3 | 4 | 5 | 6 | 7 | 8 |
|---|---|---|---|---|---|---|---|---|---|---|
| Labour | Jim Dempster | 22.0 | 1,261 | | | | | | | |
| Conservative | Gill Dykes | 19.2 | 1,102 | 1,106.10 | 1,117.38 | 1,138.47 | 1,195.83 | | | |
| Labour | John Syme | 15.3 | 876 | 942.11 | 961.57 | 989.39 | 1,010.03 | 1,011.46 | 1,074.06 | 1,136.04 |
| SNP | Andrew Stuart Wood | 13.7 | 783 | 790.02 | 816.39 | 842.57 | 899.21 | 901.90 | 996.69 | 1,117.31 |
| Conservative | Neil McKay | 13.1 | 753 | 757.74 | 766.02 | 794.56 | 836.65 | 870.23 | 985.48 | |
| Liberal Democrats | Rog Wood | 6.6 | 378 | 386.66 | 397.03 | 414.48 | 474.85 | 477.80 | | |
| Independent | Mike Steele | 4.5 | 256 | 258.46 | 294.01 | 317.28 | | | | |
| UKIP | Douglas Watters | 3.1 | 175 | 178.01 | 181.19 | | | | | |
| Independent | Moses Kungu | 2.5 | 145 | 149.19 | | | | | | |
Electorate: 9,354 Valid: 5,729 Spoilt: 102 Quota: 1,146 Turnout: 62.3%
