= Nith (ward) =

Electoral ward in Dumfries and Galloway Council, Scotland

- Dumfries and Galloway
- Boundary of Nith in Dumfries and Galloway from 2017.
- Population: 10,448 (2021)
- Electorate: 8,242 (2022)
- Major settlements: Dumfries (part of)
- Scottish Parliament constituency: Dumfriesshire
- Scottish Parliament region: South Scotland
- UK Parliament constituency: Dumfries and Galloway

Current ward
- Created: 2007
- Number of councillors: 4
- Councillor: John Campbell (SNP)
- Councillor: Malcolm Johnstone (Conservative)
- Councillor: Keith Walters (Labour)
- Councillor: David R. Slater (Independent)
- Created from: Caerlaverock; Criffel; Georgetown; Lochvale; Loreburn; Marchmount; Nithsdale East

Nith is one of the thirteen wards used to elect members of the Dumfries and Galloway Council. It elects four Councillors.

== Councillors ==
Election	Councillors			
2007	John Allan Martin (Labour)	Alistair Witts (SNP)	Jack Groom (Conservative)	Colin Smyth (Labour)
2012	John Allan Martin (Labour)	Alistair Witts (SNP)	Jack Groom (Conservative)	Colin Smyth (Labour)
2017	John Allan Martin (Labour)	John Campbell (SNP)	Malcolm Johnstone (Conservative)	Elaine Murray (Labour)
2022	Keith Walters (Labour)	John Campbell (SNP)	Malcolm Johnstone (Conservative)	Robert Slater (Ind.)

== Election results ==
=== 2022 election ===
Nith - 4 seats
Party	Candidate	FPv%	Count						
Party	Candidate	FPv%	1	2	3	4	5	6	7
SNP	John Campbell (incumbent)	33.3	1,670						
Conservative	Malcolm Johnstone (incumbent)	18.0	904	920	923	937	1,386		
Labour	Keith Walters	16.7	835	949	1,291				
Conservative	Alastair Muir	10.2	515	521	523	539			
Independent	David R. Slater	9.7	488	546	562	621	642	785	1,029
Labour	Angie Whitelaw	7.1	355	409					
Green	Ann McLauchlan	4.8	240	540	559	624	629	655	
Electorate: 10,573 Valid: 5,007 Spoilt: 72 Quota: 1,002 Turnout: 48.0%

=== 2017 election ===
2017 Dumfries and Galloway Council election

Nith - 4 seats
Party	Candidate	FPv%	Count									
Party	Candidate	FPv%	1	2	3	4	5	6	7	8	9	10
Conservative	Malcolm Johnstone	29.30	1,481									
Labour	Elaine Murray	19.01	961	1,033.2								
SNP	John Campbell	16.97	858	862.75	863.32	887.71	901.77	922.72	950.35	1,379.72		
SNP	Alastair Witts (incumbent)	8.66	438	441.48	441.96	468.7	488.37	493.71	507.68			
Labour	John Martin (incumbent)	8.39	424	463.9	478.72	500.8	523.66	540.98	579.72	599.29	682.97	837.94
Independent	David Robert Slater	5.88	297	362.55	363.43	380.02	401.18	459.13	586.3	606.99	676.46	
Independent	Niall Cowan	3.88	196	246.35	247.12	252.05	278.76	321.56				
Independent	Andrew Crosbie	3.03	153	188.15	188.47	192.81	210.46					
Independent	John Dennis	2.49	126	151.02	151.67	168.34						
Green	Sandy Rogerson	2.39	121	133.67	134.22							
Electorate: 10,233 Valid: 5,055 Spoilt: 77 Quota: 1,012 Turnout: 49.4

=== 2012 election ===
2012 Dumfries and Galloway Council election

Nith - 4 seats
Party	Candidate	FPv%	Count						
Party	Candidate	FPv%	1	2	3	4	5	6	7
Labour	John Allan Martin (incumbent)	25.93	1,079						
Labour	Colin Smyth (incumbent)	19.20	799	1,010.3					
SNP	Alastair Witts (incumbent)	18.84	784	789.7	822	830.2	850.9		
Conservative	Jack Groom (incumbent)††	15.67	652	657.5	669.5	675.9	687.8	689.9	900.9
Conservative	David Slater	8.56	356	361	366.5	369.5	382.5	383.6	
Independent	Andrew Crosbie	8.36	348	352.8	376.2	391.6	430.4	435.1	514.1
Independent	Nello Paoletti	2.19	91	93.1	103.1	108.4			
Independent	Lee Vann-Wakelin	1.25	52	53.6	59.81				
Electorate: 9,844 Valid: 4,161 Spoilt: 66 Quota: 833 Turnout: 4,227 (42.27%)

=== 2007 election ===
2007 Dumfries and Galloway Council election

Nith
Party	Candidate	FPv%	Count						
Party	Candidate	FPv%	1	2	3	4	5	6	7
Labour	John Allan Martin	23.0	1,268						
SNP	Alistair Witts	20.8	1,145						
Conservative	Jack Groom	14.4	794	795.56	798.13	843.68	1,304.35		
Labour	Colin Smyth	13.0	714	847.76	854.92	912.09	940.39	954.98	1,262.99
Conservative	Frances Hassall	11.3	623	624.69	626.60	662.00			
Liberal Democrats	Kerr Little	10.9	598	605.55	614.02	740.42	794.05	857.23	
Independent	Robin Wishart	6.7	368	370.34	378.30				
Electorate: 10,021 Valid: 5,510 Spoilt: 79 Quota: 1,103 Turnout: 55.8%
