= Annandale North (ward) =

Electoral ward in Dumfries and Galloway, Scotland

- Dumfries and Galloway
- Boundary of Annandale North in Dumfries and Galloway from 2017.
- Population: 15,439 (2021)
- Electorate: 11,910 (2022)
- Major settlements: Lockerbie; Moffat
- Scottish Parliament constituency: Dumfriesshire
- Scottish Parliament region: South Scotland
- UK Parliament constituency: Dumfriesshire, Clydesdale and Tweeddale

Current ward
- Created: 2007
- Number of councillors: 4
- Councillor: Stephen Thompson (SNP)
- Councillor: Gail MacGregor (Conservative)
- Councillor: Lynne Davis (Conservative)
- Councillor: Carolyne Wilson (Labour)
- Created from: Dryfe and Lockerbie East; Hoddom and Kinmount; Lochmaben; Lockerbie and Upper Annandale; Moffat

Annandale North is one of the thirteen wards used to elect members of the Dumfries and Galloway Council. It elects four Councillors.

== Councillors ==
Election	Councillors			
2007	Roger Brian Grant (Conservative)	Ted Brown (Labour)	Gail MacGregor (Conservative)	Michael Dickie (Liberal Democrats)
2012	Peter Diggle (Conservative)	Ted Brown (Labour)	Gail MacGregor (Conservative)	Stephen Thompson (SNP)
2017	Douglas Fairburn (Conservative)	Adam Wilson (Labour)	Gail MacGregor (Conservative)	Stephen Thompson (SNP)
2022	Lynne Davis (Conservative)	Carolyne Wilson (Labour)	Gail MacGregor (Conservative)	Stephen Thompson (SNP)

== Election results ==
=== 2022 election ===
Annandale North - 4 seats
Party	Candidate	FPv%	Count				
Party	Candidate	FPv%	1	2	3	4	5
SNP	Stephen Thompson (incumbent)	30.1	1,725				
Conservative	Gail MacGregor (incumbent)	20.0	1,153				
Conservative	Lynne Davis	19.4	1,114	1,134	1,135	1,142	1,165
Labour	Carolyne Wilson	13.9	797	951	951	973	1,266
Conservative	Doug Fairbairn (incumbent)	10.8	621	634	636	638	647
Green	Jennifer Norris	4.6	263	487	487	548	
Alba	Marion Collins	1.2	68	123	123		
Electorate: 11,910 Valid: 5,741 Spoilt: 74 Quota: 1,149 Turnout: 48.8%

=== 2017 election ===
2017 Dumfries and Galloway Council election

Annandale North - 4 seats
Party	Candidate	FPv%	Count			
Party	Candidate	FPv%	1	2	3	4
Conservative	Douglas Fairbairn (incumbent)	28.76	1,573			
Conservative	Gail McGregor (incumbent)	25.72	1,407			
SNP	Stephen Thompson (incumbent)	23.91	1,308			
Labour	Adam Wilson	16.91	925	998.84	1,055.83	1,126.99
Liberal Democrats	Lisa Courts	4.70	257	356.37	438.41	500.94
Electorate: 11,540 Valid: 5,470 Spoilt: 69 Quota: 1,095 Turnout: 47.4

=== 2012 election ===
2012 Dumfries and Galloway Council election

Annandale North - 4 seats
Party	Candidate	FPv%	Count						
Party	Candidate	FPv%	1	2	3	4	5	6	7
Labour	Ted Brown (incumbent)†	19.59	845	923					
SNP	Stephen Thompson	16.78	724	768	782.5	796.9	799.1	800.4	1,067.9
Conservative	Peter Diggle††	15.11	652	690	693.1	875.4			
Green	Alis Ballance	14.26	615	673	687.3	755.7	759.4	761.4	
Conservative	Gail MacGregor (incumbent)	13.07	564	641	645.5	885.3			
Conservative	Roger Brian Grant (incumbent)	12.31	531	566	568.7				
Liberal Democrats	Hugh Young	8.88	383						
Electorate: 10,175 Valid: 4,314 Spoilt: 34 Quota: 863 Turnout: 4,348 (42.4%)

=== 2007 election ===
2007 Dumfries and Galloway Council election

Annandale North
Party	Candidate	FPv%	Count						
Party	Candidate	FPv%	1	2	3	4	5	6	7
Conservative	Roger Brian Grant	18.5	1,011	1,019	1,146				
Labour	Ted Brown	15.0	818	843	848	848.95	889.04	1,002.09	1,095.45
Conservative	Gail MacGregor	13.7	751	754	834	866.58	907.39	959.48	1,089.89
Liberal Democrats	Michael Dickie	13.7	749	786	805	808.86	862.00	1,043.31	1,328.72
SNP	Johanne Lydia Wood	13.0	710	733	739	739.82	775.95		
Independent	Billy Lockhart	10.0	547	559	578	583.85	796.26	934.26	
Independent	Jean Hamilton Purves	8.2	446	461	467	470.72			
Conservative	Neil MacInnes	5.1	277	278					
Green	Alis Ballance	2.9	159						
Electorate: 9,951 Valid: 5,468 Spoilt: 84 Quota: 1,094 Turnout: 55.8%
