= Abbey (Dumfries and Galloway ward) =

Electoral ward in Dumfries and Galloway Council, Scotland

- Dumfries and Galloway
- Boundary of Abbey in Dumfries and Galloway from 2017.
- Population: 10,471 (2021)
- Electorate: 8,592 (2022)
- Major settlements: Dalbeattie
- Scottish Parliament constituency: Galloway and West Dumfries
- Scottish Parliament region: South Scotland
- UK Parliament constituency: Dumfries and Galloway

Current ward
- Created: 2007
- Number of councillors: 3
- Councillor: Kim Lowe (SNP)
- Councillor: Davie Stitt (Labour)
- Councillor: Ian Blake (Conservative)
- Created from: Castle Douglas Urr; Criffel; Dalbeattie Craignair; Dalbeattie Milton; Maxwelltown; Troqueer

Abbey is one of the twelve electoral wards of Dumfries and Galloway Council. Created in 2007, the ward was a four-member ward until boundary changes in 2017. It now elects three councillors using the single transferable vote electoral system and covers an area with a population of 10,471 people.

The area has produced strong results for the Conservative who held half the seats between 2007 and 2011 and Labour who held half the seats from 2011 to 2017.

== Boundaries ==
The ward was created following the Fourth Statutory Reviews of Electoral Arrangements ahead of the 2007 Scottish local elections. As a result of the Local Governance (Scotland) Act 2004, local elections in Scotland would use the single transferable vote electoral system from 2007 onwards so Abbey was formed from an amalgamation of several previous first-past-the-post wards. It contained all of the former Dalbeattie Craignair and Troqueer wards, the majority of the former Criffel, Dalbeattie Milton wards and part of the former Castle Douglas Urr, Maxwelltown wards. Abbey took in a central area in the south of the council area that was within the historic county of Kirkcudbrightshire and runs along the Solway Firth and Irish Sea coast. It included the town of Dalbeattie as well as the villages of Cargenbridge, New Abbey, Beeswing, Kirkgunzeon, Southerness, Sandyhills, Rockcliffe and Palnackie. Following the Fifth Statutory Reviews of Electoral Arrangements ahead of the 2017 Scottish local elections, the ward's western boundary was brought east and an area around the mouth of the Urr Water was transferred to the newly-created Castle Douglas and Crocketford ward. An area north of Dalbeattie around Kirgunzeon and Beeswing was also transferred to the Castle Douglas and Crocketford ward as Abbey was reduced from a four-member ward to a three-member ward.

== Councillors ==
Election	Councillors			
2007	Ian Blake (Conservative)	Rob Davidson (SNP)	Davie Stitt (Labour)	Bruce Hodgson (Conservative)
2008 by-election	Ian Blake (Conservative)	Rob Davidson (SNP)	Davie Stitt (Labour)	Michael John Thomson (Conservative)
2011 by-election	Ian Blake (Conservative)	Rob Davidson (SNP)	Davie Stitt (Labour)	Tom McAughtrie (Labour)
2012	Ian Blake (Conservative)	Rob Davidson (SNP)	Davie Stitt (Labour)	Tom McAughtrie (Labour)
2017	Ian Blake (Conservative)	Rob Davidson (SNP)	Davie Stitt (Labour)	
2022	Ian Blake (Conservative)	Kim Lowe (SNP)	Davie Stitt (Labour)	

== Election results ==
=== 2022 election ===
Abbey - 3 seats
Party	Candidate	FPv%	Count		
Party	Candidate	FPv%	1	2	3
SNP	Kim Lowe	31.1	1,267		
Labour	Davie Stitt (incumbent)	25.9	1,053		
Conservative	Ian Blake (incumbent)	24.6	1,005	1,014	1,020
Conservative	Robin Wishart	12.0	489	493	496
Liberal Democrats	Matthew Pumphrey	6.3	256	375	390
Electorate: 8,592 Valid: 4,070 Spoilt: 76 Quota: 1,018 Turnout: 48.3%

=== 2017 election ===
2017 Dumfries and Galloway Council election

Abbey - 3 seats
Party	Candidate	FPv%	Count						
Party	Candidate	FPv%	1	2	3	4	5	6	7
Conservative	Ian Blake (incumbent)	39.38	1,664						
Labour	Davie Stitt (incumbent)	21.92	926	1,084.31					
SNP	Rob Davidson (incumbent)	16.21	685	698.13	703.77	738.18	932.12	988.26	1,159.28
No description	Tom McAughtrie (incumbent)	10.60	448	517.31	521.99	532.31	540.35	645.66	
SNP	Kim Lowe	4.90	207	209.92	211.17	235.76			
Independent	Belle Doyle	4.14	175	268.75	271.41	314.93	324.82		
Green	Clare Phillips	2.84	120	151.74	155.6				
Electorate: 8,284 Valid: 4,225 Spoilt: 59 Quota: 1,057 Turnout: 51.0

=== 2012 election ===
2012 Dumfries and Galloway Council election

Abbey - 4 seats
Party	Candidate	FPv%	Count	
Party	Candidate	FPv%	1	2
Labour	Tom McAughtrie (incumbent)	22.95	903	
Conservative	Ian Blake (incumbent)	21.75	856	
SNP	Rob Davidson (incumbent)	20.69	814	
Labour	Davie Stitt (incumbent)	19.9	783	870.2
Conservative	Charles Milroy	10.29	405	411.1
UKIP	Bill Wright	4.42	174	178.6
Electorate: 9,019 Valid: 3,935 Spoilt: 65 Quota: 788 Turnout: 4,000 (43.63%)

=== 2011 by-election ===
Abbey by-election June 16, 2011 - 1 Seat
Party	Candidate	FPv%	Count	
Party	Candidate	FPv%	1	2
Conservative	Kath Lord	39.46	1,236	1,391
Labour	Tom McAughtrie	38.19	1,196	1,448
SNP	Yowann Byghan	21.65	678	
Labour gain from Conservative		Swing		
Electorate: 9,249 Valid: 3,132 Spoilt: 22 Quota: 1,566 Turnout: 3,154

=== 2008 by-election ===
Abbey by-election May 1, 2008 - 1 Seat
Party	Candidate	FPv%	Count			
Party	Candidate	FPv%	1	2	3	4
Conservative	Michael John Thomson	40.08	1,713	1,749	1,804	2,006
Labour	Tom McAughtrie	33.18	1,393	1,418	1,471	1,712
SNP	John Richard McNaught	17.98	755	785	833	
Independent	Graham William Sutherland McLeod	4.12	173	216		
Liberal Democrats	Keith Joseph Mycock	3.91	164			
Conservative hold		Swing				
Electorate: 9,381 Valid: 4,224 Spoilt: 26 Quota: 2,100 Turnout: 4,250

=== 2007 election ===
2007 Dumfries and Galloway Council election

Abbey
Party	Candidate	FPv%	Count								
Party	Candidate	FPv%	1	2	3	4	5	6	7	8	9
Conservative	Ian Blake	19.7	1,081	1,091	1,126						
SNP	Rob Davidson	17.8	976	996	1,010	1,010.90	1,056.97	1,097.97	1,153.02		
Conservative	Bruce Hodgson	14.2	778	825	834	851.27	883.96	924.15	990.59	995.94	1,052.65
Labour	Tom McAughtrie	14.1	777	794	797	797.39	812.44	856.44	874.46	881.32	
Labour	Davie Stitt	14.0	770	777	806	807.08	843.22	881.22	943.36	953.57	1,479.11
Liberal Democrats	Josephine Robertson	4.9	267	280	290	290.37	316.42				
Independent	John White	4.3	239	266	304	304.90	372.27	418.34			
Independent	Stuart Martin Clement	3.8	211	226	269	270.85					
Independent	Ian Stewart McMickan	3.7	203	211							
Independent	Michael John Thomson	3.5	194								
Electorate: 9,347 Valid: 5,496 Spoilt: 85 Quota: 1,100 Turnout: 59.7%
