= North West Dumfries (ward) =

Electoral ward in Dumfries and Galloway Council, Scotland

- Dumfries and Galloway
- Boundary of North West Dumfries in Dumfries and Galloway from 2017.
- Population: 14,705 (2021)
- Electorate: 10,203 (2022)
- Major settlements: Dumfries (part of)
- Scottish Parliament constituency: Galloway and West Dumfries
- Scottish Parliament region: South Scotland
- UK Parliament constituency: Dumfries and Galloway

Current ward
- Created: 2007
- Number of councillors: 4
- Councillor: Andy Ferguson (SNP)
- Councillor: Graham Bell (Conservative)
- Councillor: Emma Jordan (Labour)
- Councillor: Paula Stevenson (Labour)
- Created from: Criffel; Lincluden; Lochside; Maxwelltown; Palmerston

North West Dumfries is one of the twelve electoral wards of Dumfries and Galloway Council. Created in 2007, the ward elects four councillors using the single transferable vote electoral system and covers an area with a population of 14,705 people.

The area has produced strong results for Labour who have half the seats at each election since the ward's creation.

== Boundaries ==
The ward was created by the Local Government Boundary Commission for Scotland following the Fourth Statutory Reviews of Electoral Arrangements ahead of the 2007 Scottish local elections. As a result of the Local Governance (Scotland) Act 2004, local elections in Scotland would use the single transferable vote electoral system from 2007 onwards so Abbey was formed from an amalgamation of several previous first-past-the-post wards. It contained all of the former Lincluden, Lochside and Palmerston wards and the majority of the former Maxwelltown as well as part of the former Criffel ward. North West Dumfries takes in the north and west of the town of Dumfries – everything west of the River Nith and north of Park Road/Rotchell Road – in the east of the council area. It includes the neighbourhoods of Lincluden, Lochside, Lochfield, Summerville, Laurieknowe and Suffolk Hill as well as the village of Newbridge to the north of the town. The ward's boundaries were unchanged following the Fifth Statutory Reviews of Electoral Arrangements conducted by the Local Government Boundary Commission for Scotland ahead of the 2017 Scottish local elections.

== Councillors ==
Election	Councillors			
2007	Ronnie Nicholson (Labour)	John Graham Bell (Conservative)	David John McKie (Labour)	Doug Snell (SNP)
2012	Ronnie Nicholson (Labour)	John Graham Bell (Conservative)	David John McKie (Labour)	Andy Ferguson (SNP)
2017	Ronnie Nicholson (Labour)	John Graham Bell (Conservative)	David John McKie (Labour)	Andy Ferguson (SNP)
2022	Paula Stevenson (Labour)	John Graham Bell (Conservative)	Emma Jordan (Labour)	Andy Ferguson (SNP)

== Election results ==
=== 2022 election ===
North West Dumfries - 4 seats
Party	Candidate	FPv%	Count				
Party	Candidate	FPv%	1	2	3	4	5
SNP	Andy Ferguson (incumbent)	39.5	1,561				
Conservative	Graham Bell (incumbent)	28.4	1,123				
Labour	Emma Jordan	18.4	728	919			
Labour	Paula Stevenson	8.8	347	404	495	607	909
Green	Ann Johnstone	4.8	191	526	571	579	
Electorate: 10,203 Valid: 3,950 Spoilt: 62 Quota: 791 Turnout: 39.3%

=== 2017 election ===
2017 Dumfries and Galloway Council election

North West Dumfries - 4 seats
Party	Candidate	FPv%	Count				
Party	Candidate	FPv%	1	2	3	4	5
Conservative	John Graham Bell (incumbent)	32.54	1,374				
SNP	Andy Ferguson (incumbent)	16.41	693	708.02	736.4	774.41	1,314.26
Labour	Ronnie Nicholson (incumbent)††	16.08	679	722.51	732.59	763.44	778.6
Labour	David John McKie (incumbent)	14.47	611	694.93	720.86	784.57	809.27
SNP	Stacy Bradley	13.60	574	588.25	613.02	642.33	
Independent	Billy Farries	3.86	163	268.88	304.73		
Green	Michelle Johnston	3.03	128	156.49			
Electorate: 9,981 Valid: 4,222 Spoilt: 112 Quota: 845 Turnout: 42.3

=== 2012 election ===
2012 Dumfries and Galloway Council election

North West Dumfries - 4 seats
Party	Candidate	FPv%	Count				
Party	Candidate	FPv%	1	2	3	4	5
Labour	Ronnie Nicholson (incumbent)	23.25	932				
Conservative	John Graham Bell (incumbent)	22.43	899				
Labour	David John McKie (incumbent)	21.38	857				
SNP	Andy Ferguson	18.44	739	746.1	768.5	773.2	982.1
Labour	Paula Stevenson	14.50	581	690.1	702.2	746.7	
Electorate: 9,906 Valid: 4,008 Spoilt: 66 Quota: 802 Turnout: 4,074 (40.46%)

=== 2007 election ===
2007 Dumfries and Galloway Council election

North West Dumfries
Party	Candidate	FPv%	Count						
Party	Candidate	FPv%	1	2	3	4	5	6	7
Labour	Ronnie Nicholson	25.6	1,327						
Conservative	John Graham Bell	20.4	1,060						
Labour	David John McKie	19.2	996	1,132.95					
SNP	Doug Snell	15.6	809	819.85	824.49	827.34	864.91	950.22	1,179.06
Labour	Stephen David Harman	12.5	650	722.49	789.41	790.64	823.31	868.90	
Liberal Democrats	Joe Sweeney	3.6	188	192.12	194.25	197.99	240.41		
Independent	Arthur Tremble	3.1	163	169.73	173.46	177.52			
Electorate: 9,794 Valid: 5,193 Spoilt: 124 Quota: 1,039 Turnout: 54.3%
