= Willie Scobie =

Scottish politician

Councillor for Stranraer and the Rhins
- Incumbent
- Assumed office 3 May 2007

Councillor for Knockcullie (Stranraer South)
- In office 7 May 1992 – 3 May 2007
- Preceded by: W D Wallace

Personal details
- Born: 5 September 1950 Stranraer, Scotland
- Party: Independent
- Other political affiliations: Scottish Labour (until 2012); Democratic Alliance (since 2023)
- Children: 2
- Relatives: William Scobie Sr. (father)
- Education: University of Strathclyde

William Scobie is a Scottish politician who served as a councillor in Dumfries and Galloway for 33 years. He served as a councillor for Stranraer and the Rhins from 3 May 2007 until stepping down in September 2025. Prior to the introduction of single transferable vote in 2007, he served as a ward councillor for Knockcullie (Stranraer South) for Wigtownshire District Council from 1992 to 1995, and for Dumfries and Galloway Council from 1995 to 2007.

== Political views ==
Scobie is a self-described socialist and a member of the A75/A77 Lobbying Action Group. He quit Scottish Labour in 2012 over election contract rules imposed by the local party. In 2023, Scobie formed the Democratic Alliance alongside two other independent councillors following the collapse of the 2022 "rainbow coalition" between the Scottish National Party and Scottish Labour groups. In 2021, Scobie declared a seagull "epidemic", which lead to the introduction of new "gull-proof" public bins.
