= Annandale South (ward) =

Electoral ward in Dumfries and Galloway, Scotland

- Dumfries and Galloway
- Boundary of Annandale South in Dumfries and Galloway from 2017.
- Population: 14,651 (2021)
- Electorate: 11,245 (2022)
- Major settlements: Annan
- Scottish Parliament constituency: Dumfriesshire
- Scottish Parliament region: South Scotland
- UK Parliament constituency: Dumfriesshire, Clydesdale and Tweeddale

Current ward
- Created: 2007
- Number of councillors: 4
- Councillor: Ian Carruthers (Conservative)
- Councillor: George Jamieson (SNP)
- Councillor: Sean W. Marshall (Labour)
- Councillor: Richard Brodie (Liberal Democrats)
- Created from: Annan Central; Annan East; Annan West; Caerlaverock; Chapelcross; Hoddom and Kinmount; Nithsdale East

Annandale South is one of the thirteen wards used to elect members of the Dumfries and Galloway Council. It elects four Councillors.

== Councillors ==
Election	Councillors			
2007	Sean W. Marshall (Labour)	Richard Brodie (Liberal Democrats)	Ian Carruthers (Conservative)	Ronnie Ogilvie (Labour)
2012	Sean W. Marshall (Labour)	Richard Brodie (Liberal Democrats)	Ian Carruthers (Conservative)	Ronnie Ogilvie (Labour)
2017	Sean W. Marshall (Labour)	Richard Brodie (Liberal Democrats)	Ian Carruthers (Conservative)	Henry McClelland (SNP)
2022	Sean W. Marshall (Labour)	Richard Brodie (Liberal Democrats)	Ian Carruthers (Conservative)	Gorge Jamieson (SNP)

== Election results ==
=== 2022 election ===
Annandale South - 4 seats
Party	Candidate	FPv%	Count					
Party	Candidate	FPv%	1	2	3	4	5	6
Conservative	Ian Carruthers (incumbent)	21.9	1,118					
SNP	George Jamieson	21.6	1,104					
Labour	Sean W. Marshall (incumbent)	19.1	975	982	1,003	1,063		
Liberal Democrats	Richard Brodie (incumbent)	17.7	902	911	924	995	1,017	1,396
Conservative	Alan Weild	16.4	839	909	910	921	926	
Scottish Green	Cameron Garrett	3.3	166	166	195			
Electorate: 11,245 Valid: 5,104 Spoilt: 94 Quota: 1,021 Turnout: 46.2%

=== 2017 election ===
2017 Dumfries and Galloway Council election

Annandale South - 4 seats
Party	Candidate	FPv%	Count						
Party	Candidate	FPv%	1	2	3	4	5	6	7
Conservative	Ian Carruthers (incumbent)	31.48	1,621						
Liberal Democrats	Richard Brodie (incumbent)	19.58	1,008	1,183.73					
SNP	Henry McClelland	17.81	917	933.41	950.54	950.67	972.18	999.06	1,152.05
Labour	Sean W. Marshall (incumbent)	13.61	701	768.08	811.3	819.7	1,190.65		
Independent	Allan Weild	8.74	450	550.99	585.58	599.68	634.99	674.21	
Labour	Ronnie Ogilvie (incumbent)	8.33	429	451.6	467.73	470.63			
Scottish Libertarian	Peter McKain	0.45	23	31.02	34.55				
Electorate: 10,955 Valid: 5,149 Spoilt: 72 Quota: 1,030 Turnout: 47

=== 2012 election ===
2012 Dumfries and Galloway Council election

Annandale South - 4 seats
Party	Candidate	FPv%	Count					
Party	Candidate	FPv%	1	2	3	4	5	6
Liberal Democrats	Richard Brodie (incumbent)	21.09	959					
Labour	Sean W. Marshall (incumbent)	19.55	889	901.3	903.3	905.7	1,005.7	
Conservative	Ian Carruthers (incumbent)††	19.38	881	889.6	933			
Labour	Ronnie Ogilvie (incumbent)	16.74	761	764.6	766.7	767.4	842.6	916.3
SNP	Andrew Wilson	12.49	568	573.9	577	578.9	664.9	670.9
Independent	Marion F. B. Stewart	9.15	416	424.7	432.9	438.6		
Conservative	Brian Pope	1.61	73	73.9				
Electorate: 10,864 Valid: 4,547 Spoilt: 55 Quota: 910 Turnout: 4,602 (41.85%)

=== 2007 election ===
2007 Dumfries and Galloway Council election

Annandale South
Party	Candidate	FPv%	Count						
Party	Candidate	FPv%	1	2	3	4	5	6	7
Labour	Sean W. Marshall	23.1	1,324						
Liberal Democrats	Richard Brodie	16.9	970	1,001.63	1,139.01	1,183.28			
Conservative	Ian Carruthers	16.4	936	939.92	983.60	1,406.95			
Labour	Ronnie Ogilvie	14.1	807	903.93	1,001.72	1,016.26	1,040.12	1,049.86	1,315.73
SNP	John McNaught	11.6	665	674.33	743.73	766.00	804.06	812.86	
Conservative	Sharon Jane Ledger	9.2	527	530.24	582.65				
Independent	John Ramage	8.6	494	504.14					
Electorate: 10,833 Valid: 5,723 Spoilt: 122 Quota: 1,145 Turnout: 53.9%
