= Mid Galloway and Wigtown West (ward) =

Electoral ward in Dumfries and Galloway, Scotland

- Dumfries and Galloway
- Boundary of Mid Galloway and Wigtown West in Dumfries and Galloway from 2017.
- Population: 13,461 (2021)
- Electorate: 10,981 (2022)
- Major settlements: Newton Stewart; Wigtown
- Scottish Parliament constituency: Galloway and West Dumfries
- Scottish Parliament region: South Scotland
- UK Parliament constituency: Dumfries and Galloway

Current ward
- Created: 2017
- Number of councillors: 4
- Councillor: David Inglis (Conservative)
- Councillor: Katie Hagmann (SNP)
- Councillor: Jackie McCamon (Conservative)
- Councillor: Richard Marsh (Conservative)
- Created from: Mid Galloway; Wigtown West

Mid Galloway and Wigtown West is one of the twelve electoral wards of Dumfries and Galloway Council. Created in 2017, the ward elects four councillors using the single transferable vote electoral system and covers an area with a population of 13,461 people.

The area has produced strong results for the Conservatives who have held at least half of the seats since the ward was created in 2017.

== Boundaries ==
The ward was created by the Local Government Boundary Commission for Scotland following the Fifth Statutory Reviews of Electoral Arrangements ahead of the 2017 Scottish local elections. Five of the 13 multi-member wards in Dumfries and Galloway were abolished as a result of the review and replaced by four new ones. Mid Galloway and Wigtown West encompasses an area represented by the former Mid Galloway, Wigtown West and Dee wards. The ward takes in an area in the west of the council area from the boundaries with East Ayrshire and South Ayrshire to the Machars peninsula between Luce Bay and Wigtown Bay in the Irish Sea. It is situated within Galloway and takes in the western part of the historic county of Wigtownshire. The ward's name is a reference to the historic county and not the town of Wigtown which is wholly included within the ward. The ward also includes the towns of Newton Stewart, Creetown and Whithorn as well as villages including Castle Kennedy, Dunragit, Kirkcowan, Kirkinner, Whauphill, Port William and the Isle of Whithorn.

== Councillors ==
Election	Councillors			
2017	David Inglis (Conservative)	Graham Nicol (Conservative)	Katie Hagmann (SNP)	Jim McColm (Ind.)
2022	David Inglis (Conservative)	Jackie McCamon (Conservative)	Katie Hagmann (SNP)	Sandy Whitelaw (Labour)
2022 by-election	David Inglis (Conservative)	Jackie McCamon (Conservative)	Katie Hagmann (SNP)	Richard Marsh (Conservative)

== Election results ==
=== 2022 by-election ===
Sandy Whitelaw resigned after a few months for personal reasons. Conservative candidate Richard Marsh was elected in the by-election held on 8 December 2022.

Mid Galloway and Wigtown West by-election (8 December 2022) - 1 seat
Party	Candidate	FPv%	Count
Party	Candidate	FPv%	1
Conservative	Richard Marsh	52.8	1,787
SNP	Ian Gibson	26.0	879
Labour	John McCutcheon	9.6	326
Liberal Democrats	Iain McDonald	5.6	190
Green	Daniel Hooper-Jones	5.1	172
Electorate: 10,981 Valid: 3,354 Spoilt: 26 Quota: 1,678 Turnout: 30.8%

=== 2022 election ===
Mid Galloway and Wigtown West - 4 seats
Party	Candidate	FPv%	Count				
Party	Candidate	FPv%	1	2	3	4	5
Conservative	David Inglis (incumbent)	30.8	1,529				
SNP	Katie Hagmann (incumbent)	30.3	1,505				
Conservative	Jackie McCamon	19.4	964	1,428			
Labour	Sandy Whitelaw	11.3	559	578	681	806	1,240
Green	Kenny Campbell	8.2	405	415	690	736	
Electorate: 10,908 Valid: 4,962 Spoilt: 98 Quota: 993 Turnout: 46.4%

=== 2017 election ===
2017 Dumfries and Galloway Council election

Mid Galloway and Wigtown West - 4 seats
Party	Candidate	FPv%	Count								
Party	Candidate	FPv%	1	2	3	4	5	6	7	8	9
Conservative	David Inglis	26.07	1,403								
Independent	Jim McColm (incumbent)	18.13	976	1,012.01	1,027.25	1,050.25	1,158.41				
Conservative	Graham Nicol (incumbent) †††††	13.43	723	960.46	962.93	971.02	1,009.64	1,032.12	1,234.63		
SNP	Katie Hagmann	13.02	701	703.32	708.32	733.32	806.49	811.66	860.02	867.82	1,416.84
SNP	Steve Norris	10.63	572	574.32	577.56	587.56	606.25	612.84	657.4	664.87	
Independent	Richard Oxley	8.83	475	48.01	496.24	506.24	551.94	579.43			
Labour	Matthew Curry	6.84	368	375.67	379.9	407.36					
Green	Barbara Bannatyne	2.16	116	118.32	121.79						
Independent	John McCutcheon	0.89	48	49.86							
Electorate: 9,594 Valid: 5,382 Spoilt: 120 Quota: 1,076 Turnout: 57.3
