= Lochar (ward) =

Electoral ward in Dumfries and Galloway, Scotland

- Dumfries and Galloway
- Boundary of Lochar in Dumfries and Galloway from 2017.
- Population: 12,270 (2021)
- Electorate: 11,299 (2022)
- Major settlements: Locharbriggs
- Scottish Parliament constituency: Dumfriesshire
- Scottish Parliament region: South Scotland
- UK Parliament constituency: Dumfriesshire, Clydesdale and Tweeddale; Dumfries and Galloway

Current ward
- Created: 1980
- Number of councillors: 4
- Councillor: Tracey Little (SNP)
- Councillor: Ivor Hyslop (Conservative)
- Councillor: Linda Dorward (Labour)
- Councillor: Maureen Johnstone (Conservative)
- Created from: Dalswinton; Heathhall

Lochar is one of the thirteen wards used to elect members of the Dumfries and Galloway Council. It elects four Councillors.

== Councillors ==
Election	Councillors			
2007	Jeff Leaver (Labour)	Lorna Jean McGowan (SNP)	John Anthony Charteris (Conservative)	Ivor Alexander Hyslop (Conservative)
2012	Jeff Leaver (Labour)	Ted Thompson (SNP)	Jeff Leaver (Labour)	Ivor Alexander Hyslop (Conservative)
2017	Jeff Leaver (Labour)	Tracey Little (SNP)	John Anthony Charteris (Conservative)	Ivor Alexander Hyslop (Conservative)
2022	Linda Dorward (Labour)	Tracey Little (SNP)	Maureen Johnstone (Conservative)	Ivor Alexander Hyslop (Conservative)

== Election results ==
=== 2022 election ===
Lochar - 4 seats
Party	Candidate	FPv%	Count			
Party	Candidate	FPv%	1	2	3	4
SNP	Tracey Little (incumbent)	33.7	1,787			
Conservative	Ivor Hyslop (incumbent)	25.4	1,348			
Labour	Linda Dorward	21.6	1,146			
Conservative	Maureen Johnstone	14.5	772	810	1,058	1,078
Green	Sandy Rogerson	4.8	253	733	740	
Electorate: 11,299 Valid: 5,306 Spoilt: 60 Quota: 1,016 Turnout: 47.7%

=== 2017 election ===
2017 Dumfries and Galloway Council election

Lochar - 4 seats
Party	Candidate	FPv%	Count								
Party	Candidate	FPv%	1	2	3	4	5	6	7	8	9
Conservative	John Anthony Charteris	24.19	1,208								
Conservative	Ivor Alexander Hyslop (incumbent)	16.88	843	1,000.61							
Labour	Jeff Leaver (incumbent)	13.72	685	688.29	688.5	701.68	833.24	875.96	899.3	916.78	1,153.64
SNP	Tracey Little	13.20	659	661.08	661.09	685.1	689.1	710.45	1,099.98		
Independent	Yen Hongmei Jin (incumbent)	12.13	606	620.71	620.97	637.15	652.15	777.22	786.22	810.59	
SNP	Joe McGurk	8.33	416	417.21	417.23	440.58	447.58	459.75			
Independent	Maureen Johnstone	5.99	299	310.94	311.21	322.73	326.73				
Labour	Keith Walters	3.16	158	158.69	158.74	175.92					
Green	Arthur Ramsay	2.40	120	121.38	121.43						
Electorate: 10,603 Valid: 4,994 Spoilt: 118 Quota: 999 Turnout: 47.1

=== 2012 election ===
2012 Dumfries and Galloway Council election

Lochar - 4 seats
Party	Candidate	FPv%	Count				
Party	Candidate	FPv%	1	2	3	4	5
SNP	Yen Hongmei Jin††††	28.46	1,190				
Labour	Jeff Leaver (incumbent)	27.73	1,159				
Conservative	Ivor Alexander Hyslop (incumbent)	15.86	663	703	710.5	723.7	1,266.4
Conservative	John Anthony Charteris (incumbent)	15.05	629	675.9	685.6	700.3	
Labour	Ted Thompson	12.89	539	660	941.7		
Electorate: 9,295 Valid: 4,180 Spoilt: 62 Quota: 837 Turnout: 4,242 (44.97%)

=== 2007 election ===
2007 Dumfries and Galloway Council election

Lochar
Party	Candidate	FPv%	Count						
Party	Candidate	FPv%	1	2	3	4	5	6	7
Labour	Jeff Leaver	19.3	978	983	1,010	1,522			
Conservative	John Anthony Charteris	17.2	872	882	916	923	949.14	951.08	1,092.25
SNP	Lorna Jean McGowan	16.5	836	843	901	930	1,029.85		
Conservative	Ivor Alexander Hyslop	15.6	791	799	832	840	860.44	861.94	1,001.14
Labour	Alec Martin	11.8	597	603	636				
Independent	David Slater	10.9	550	593	672	686.	764.07	768.89	
Liberal Democrats	John Robertson	6.3	317	340					
Independent	Graham William Sutherland McLeod	2.3	118						
Electorate: 8,900 Valid: 5,059 Spoilt: 73 Quota: 1,012 Turnout: 57.7%
