= Stranraer and the Rhins (ward) =

Electoral ward in Dumfries and Galloway Council, Scotland

- Dumfries and Galloway
- Boundary of Stranraer and the Rhins in Dumfries and Galloway from 2017.
- Population: 14,821 (2021)
- Electorate: 11,398 (2022)
- Major settlements: Stranraer
- Scottish Parliament constituency: Galloway and West Dumfries
- Scottish Parliament region: South Scotland
- UK Parliament constituency: Dumfries and Galloway

Current ward
- Created: 2017
- Number of councillors: 4
- Councillor: Andrew Giusti (Conservative)
- Councillor: Ben Dashper (SNP)
- Councillor: Chrissie Hill (Conservative)
- Councillor: Julie Currie (Conservative)
- Created from: Stranraer and North Rhins; Wigtown West

Stranraer and the Rhins is one of the twelve electoral wards of Dumfries and Galloway Council. Created in 2017, the ward elects four councillors using the single transferable vote electoral system and covers an area with a population of 14,821 people.

The area has produced strong results for the Conservatives who have won more than 30 per cent of the vote at each election and have held half of the seats since 2022.

== Boundaries ==
The ward was created by the Local Government Boundary Commission for Scotland following the Fifth Statutory Reviews of Electoral Arrangements ahead of the 2017 Scottish local elections. Five of the 13 multi-member wards in Dumfries and Galloway were abolished as a result of the review and replaced by four new ones. Stranraer and the Rhins encompasses an area represented by the former Stranraer and North Rhins and Wigtown West wards. The ward is takes in the westernmost and southernmost part of the council area and runs along part of the boundary with South Ayrshire.

It is situated within Galloway and the historic county of Wigtownshire and includes the Rhins of Galloway double-headed peninsula. The dominant settlement is Stranraer, Dumfries and Galloway’s second largest town, at the head of Loch Ryan. Other settlements include the ferry port of Cairnryan and villages in the Rhins of Galloway including Ardwell, Drummore, Kirkcolm, Leswalt, Port Logan, Portpatrick, Sandhead and Stoneykirk. The ward is the most southerly ward in Scotland as it includes the Mull of Galloway, Scotland's most southernly point.

== Councillors ==
Year	Councillors			
2017	Willie Scobie (Ind.)	Andrew Giusti (Conservative)	Ros Surtees (SNP)	Tommy Sloan (Labour/ Ind.)
2022	Willie Scobie (Ind.)	Andrew Giusti (Conservative)	Ben Dashper (SNP)	Chrissie Hill (Conservative)
2025	Julie Currie (Conservative)	Andrew Giusti (Conservative)	Ben Dashper (SNP)	Chrissie Hill (Conservative)

== Election results ==
=== 2025 by-election ===
Stranraer and the Rhins by-election (20 November 2025) - 1 seat
Party	Candidate	FPv%	Count						
Party	Candidate	FPv%	1	2	3	4	5	6	7
Reform	John Roberts	34.4	1,386	1,391	1,399	1,403	1,429	1,455	1,523
Conservative	Julie Currie	33.5	1,302	1,305	1,321	1,330	1,375	1,417	1,565
SNP	Simon Jones	13.9	541	545	554	612	659	730	
Labour	John McCutcheon	6.1	239	242	258	283	311		
Independent	Shaun Smith	5.3	207	208	220	239			
Green	Michael Havard	3.6	141	142	158				
Liberal Democrats	Tracey Warman	2.5	96	98					
Heritage	Gisele Skinner	0.7	27						
Electorate: 11,573 Valid: 3,939 Spoilt: 29 Quota: 1,971 Turnout: 34.3%

=== 2022 election ===
Stranraer and the Rhins - 4 seats
Party	Candidate	FPv%	Count						
Party	Candidate	FPv%	1	2	3	4	5	6	7
Conservative	Andrew Giusti (incumbent)	32.8	1,518						
SNP	Ben Dashper	23.3	1,074						
Independent	Willie Scobie (incumbent)	22.8	1,051						
Labour	John McCutcheon	9.9	458	478	511	523	582	660	
Conservative	Chrissie Hill	7.3	338	804	806	816	833	861	1,025
Green	Peter Barlow	2.6	120	126	180	187			
Independent	Tommy Sloan (incumbent)	1.3	59	98	118	198	239		
Electorate: 11,398 Valid: 4,618 Spoilt: 108 Quota: 924 Turnout: 41.5%

=== 2017 election ===
2017 Dumfries and Galloway Council election

Ward 1 - Stranraer and the Rhins - 4 seats
Party	Candidate	FPv%	Count						
Party	Candidate	FPv%	1	2	3	4	5	6	7
Independent	Willie Scobie (incumbent)	36.53	1,925						
Conservative	Andrew Giusti	32.31	1,703						
SNP	Ros Surtees	14.52	765	869.4	884.62	903.35	919.09	953.34	1,013.39
Labour	Tommy Sloan	5.92	312	589.94	661.86	694.11	723.69	774.28	912.14
Independent	Tracy Davidson	3.43	181	251.95	317.4	338.72	381.51		
Independent	Marion McCutcheon (incumbent)	3.15	166	259.55	332.23	363.55	418.26	533.25	
Independent	Robert McCrae	2.33	123	164.13	231.48	242.73			
Scottish Libertarian	Chris Collings	1.80	95	134.77	174.72				
Electorate: 11,382 Valid: 5,270 Spoilt: 80 Quota: 1,055 Turnout: 46.3
