= Colin Smyth =

Scottish independent politician

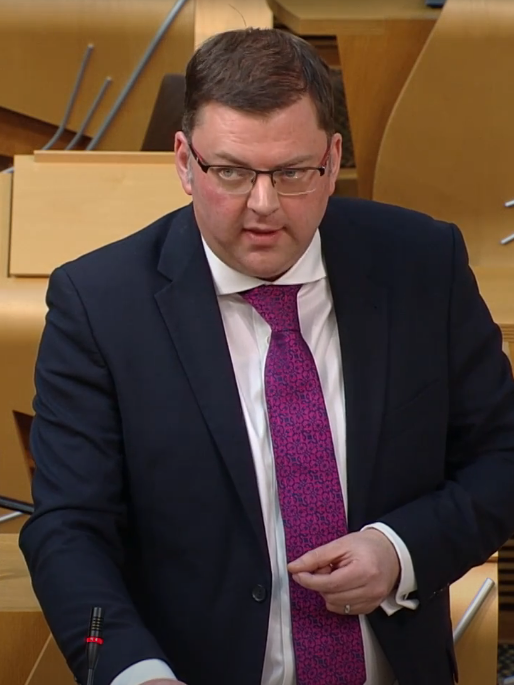
- Smyth in 2017

Member of the Scottish Parliament for South Scotland (1 of 7 Regional MSPs)
- In office 6 May 2016 – 9 April 2026

Scottish Labour portfolios
- 2017–2021: Shadow Cabinet Secretary for Transport, Infrastructure and Connectivity
- 2021–2025: Shadow Cabinet Secretary for Constitution, Europe and External Affairs

Personal details
- Born: November 1972 (age 53) Dumfries, Scotland
- Party: Independent (2025–present)
- Other political affiliations: Scottish Labour & Co-operative (until 2025)
- Education: University of Glasgow
- Website: Official website

Colin Smyth (born November 1972) is an independent, previously Scottish Labour and Co-operative, politician who served as a Member of the Scottish Parliament (MSP) for the South Scotland region from 2016 to 2026. A member of Scottish Labour, he served as its general secretary from 2008 to 2012. The whip was withdrawn from him on 20 August 2025, following his being charged with possession of indecent images of children.

== Early life and career ==
Smyth was born in 1972. He is partly of Northern Irish descent. He was raised in Dumfries, where he attended Maxwelltown High School.

Prior to entering politics, he was a modern studies teacher.

== Political career ==
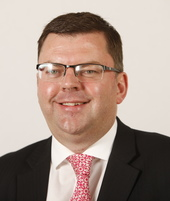
Official parliamentary portrait, 2016

Smyth became a Labour party organiser in 2003. In 2008, he was appointed general secretary of the Scottish Labour Party, succeeding Lesley Quinn. In September 2012, Scottish Labour announced that Smyth would step down from the position at the party's conference in the following month.

In 2007, Smyth was elected to Dumfries and Galloway Council, representing Nith Ward. He was re-elected to this position in 2012. In October 2013, a Labour/SNP coalition was formed on Dumfries and Galloway Council and Smyth was appointed Chair of the Planning, Housing and Environment Committee.

=== Member of the Scottish Parliament ===
In the 2016 Scottish Parliament election, Smyth was elected as an additional member, representing the South Scotland region.

He served as Scottish Labour Spokesperson for Transport, Infrastructure and Connectivity under Richard Leonard from 2017 to 2021.

Smyth nominated Anas Sarwar in the 2021 Scottish Labour leadership election. After the leadership election, Sarwar appointed Smyth as Scottish Labour Spokesperson for Constitution, Europe and External Affairs.

At the 2021 Scottish Parliament election, Smyth was supported as a Labour Co-operative candidate for the first time. He contested the constituency seat of Dumfriesshire, where he came a distant third with 4,671 votes (11.4%). Smyth was returned on the regional list for South Scotland.

Smyth backed the UK Government’s decision to introduce means-testing for the Winter Fuel Payment, voting in the Scottish Parliament against calls to reverse the decision.

Smyth was selected in April 2025 as the Labour candidate for Dumfriesshire at the 2026 Scottish Parliament election.

==== Criminal charges and suspension from Labour ====
Smyth was suspended from the Labour Party on 20 August 2025, after being charged with possession of indecent images of children, following the search of a property in Dumfries on 5 August.

On 28 August, the Daily Record reported that Smyth would also be charged with placing a hidden camera in a toilet of the Scottish Parliament and has had his parliamentary pass deactivated. He denied the allegations.

Smyth was granted bail in October 2025. Whilst on bail, he was charged with drink driving; his trial was delayed on 6 May 2026.

== Personal life ==
Smyth is married to Victoria, a teacher of English; they have two daughters.
