= 2022 Dumfries and Galloway Council election =

Dumfries and Galloway Council election

- 5 May 2022

All 43 seats to Dumfries and Galloway Council 22 seats needed for a majority
- Registered: 119,226
- Turnout: 47.1%
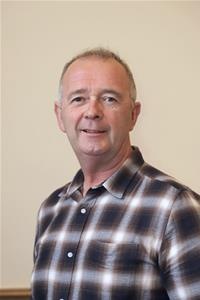

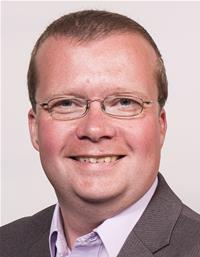

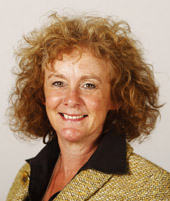

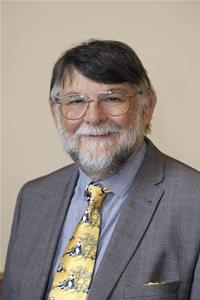
	First party	Second party	Third party
Leader	Ian Carruthers	Rob Davidson	Elaine Murray
Party	Conservative	SNP	Labour
Leader's seat	Annandale South	Abbey (stood down)	Nith (stood down)
Last election	16 seats, 37.2%	11 seats, 20.7%	11 seats, 17.7%
Seats before	16	9	8
Seats won	16	11	9
Seat change	Steady	Steady	▼2
Popular vote	21,462	15,602	9,169
Percentage	38.8%	28.2%	16.6%
Swing	▲1.6%	▲7.5%	▼1.1%
	Fourth party	Fifth party
Leader		Richard Brodie
Party	Independent	Liberal Democrats
Leader's seat		Annandale South
Last election	4 seats, 20.0%	1 seat, 2.4%
Seats before	9	1
Seats won	6	1
Seat change	▲2	Steady
Popular vote	4,762	1,810
Percentage	8.6%	3.3%
Swing	▼11.4%	▲0.9%
- 2022 Dumfries And Galloway Council election results by council ward.

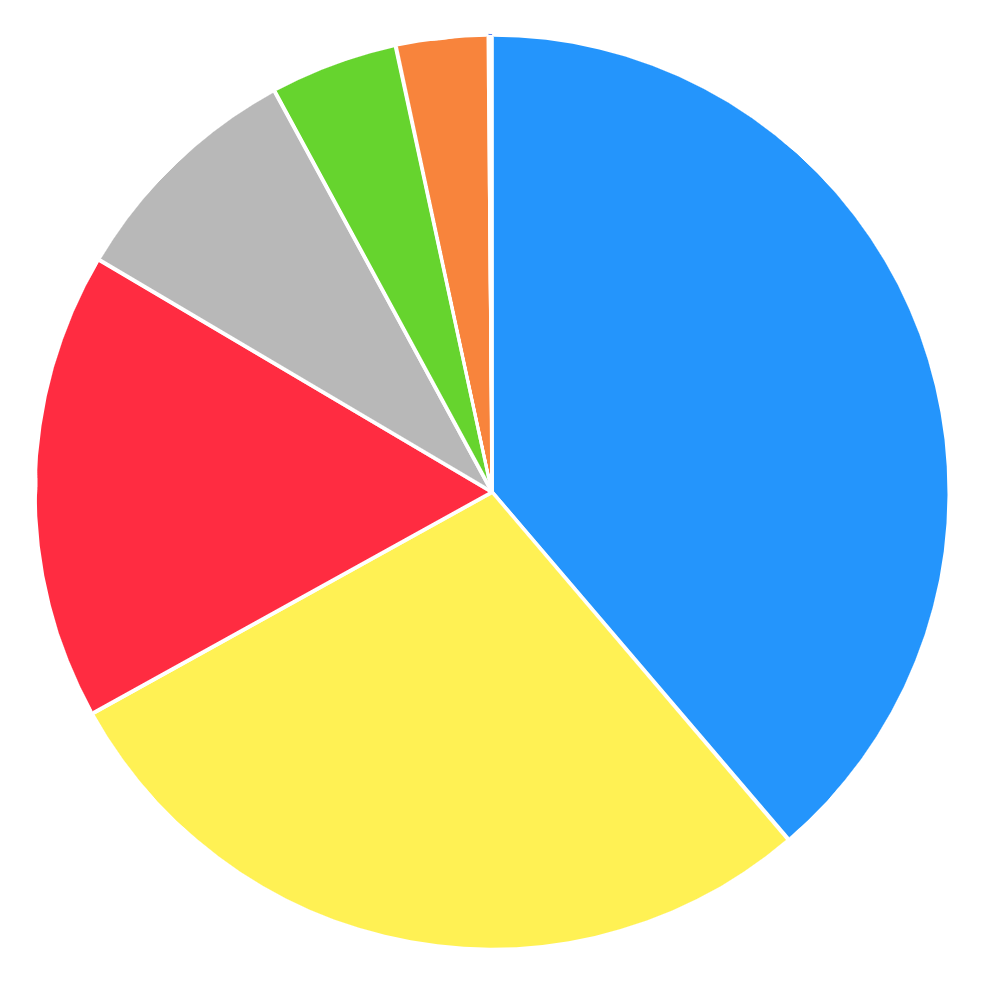
- A pie chart showing the share of 1st preference votes in Dumfries & Galloway.
Leader before election
Elaine Murray
(Labour)
No overall control
Co-leaders after election
Stephen Thompson (SNP) and
Linda Dorward (Labour)
No overall control

Elections to Dumfries and Galloway Council took place on 5 May 2022 on the same day as the 31 other Scottish local government elections. As with other Scottish council elections, it was held using single transferable vote (STV) – a form of proportional representation – in which multiple candidates are elected in each ward and voters rank candidates in order of preference.

For the second consecutive election, the Conservatives were returned as the largest party with 16 seats but remained shy of an overall majority. The Scottish National Party (SNP) increased their vote share by 7.5% but failed to make any gains and were again returned as the second-largest party with 11 seats. Labour lost two seats to return nine councillors while the Liberal Democrats retained their only seat. Six independent candidates were also elected – an increase of two.

The Labour–SNP coalition administration retained control of the council with support from two independents and Lib Dem councillor Richard Brodie. Cllrs Stephen Thompson and Linda Dorward were elected co-leaders of the council. However, the partnership collapsed less than a year after the election as the Conservatives took minority control of the council.

== Background ==
=== Previous election ===
At the previous election in 2017, the Conservatives gained two seats to hold 16 and replaced Labour as the largest party on the council. Labour lost four seats and the Scottish National Party (SNP) gained one as both returned 11 councillors. The two parties would form a coalition to run the council. The Liberal Democrats retained their only seat while the number of independents fell from seven to four.

2017 Dumfries and Galloway Council election result
Party	Seats	Vote share
Conservatives	16	37.2%
SNP	11	20.7%
Labour	11	17.7%
Independent	4	20.0%
Liberal Democrats	1	2.4%

=== Electoral system ===
The election used the nine wards created under the Local Governance (Scotland) Act 2004, with 32 councillors being elected. Each ward elected either 3 or 4 members, using the single transferable vote (STV) electoral system – a form of proportional representation – where candidates are ranked in order of preference.

=== Composition ===
Between the 2017 and 2022 elections, there were a few changes to the composition of the council. All of these were due to changes in the political affiliations of councillors. Former council leader and Labour councillor Ronnie Nicolson and Conservative councillor David James resigned from their respective parties to sit as independents. Labour councillor Jim Dempster was suspended from the party following an Islamophobic comment about then Transport Secretary Humza Yousaf. Labour councillor Tommy Sloan resigned from the party and sat as an independent councillor and member of the Dumfries and Galloway Socialists Group while SNP councillor Dougie Campbell left the party and stood as an independent at the 2022 election. SNP councillor Andrew Wood initially resigned from the party to sit as an independent. He later joined the Conservatives. There were two by-elections and both resulted in Conservative holds.

Composition of Dumfries and Galloway Council
Party	2017 result	Dissolution
Conservative	16	16
SNP	11	9
Labour	11	8
Independents	4	9
Liberal Democrats	1	1

=== Retiring councillors ===
Many prominent elected members stood down at this election, including the leader of the council, and former Dumfriesshire MSP, Elaine Murray.

Retiring councillors
Ward	Party	Retiring councillor
Stranraer and the Rhins	SNP	Ros Surtees
Mid Galloway and Wigtown West	Independent	Jim McColm
Dee and Glenkens	Independent	Jane Maitland
Dee and Glenkens	Conservative	Patsy Gilroy
Castle Douglas and Crocketford	Independent	David James
Abbey	SNP	Rob Davidson
North West Dumfries	Independent	Ronnie Nicholson
North West Dumfries	Independent	David John McKie
Mid and Upper Nithsdale	Conservative	Matthew Ronnie
Lochar	Labour	Jeff Leaver
Lochar	Conservative	John Charteris
Nith	Labour	Elaine Murray
Nith	Labour	John Martin
Annandale South	SNP	Henry McClelland
Annandale North	Labour	Adam Wilson

=== Candidates ===
The total number of candidates fell from 88 in 2017 to 74. The Conservatives named the most candidates at 24 - eight more than in 2017 when both Labour and the SNP named more candidates. Labour named 14 candidates in 2022 while the SNP named 12 candidates - both down from the 17 they named respectively in 2017. The Greens named 10 candidates, an increase of three from 2017. In 2017, the number of independent candidates (26) outstripped the number of candidates named by any individual political party but only eight independent candidates stood in 2022. The Liberal Democrats named five candidates - an increase of two from 2017. The Alba Party contested an election in Dumfries and Galloway for the first time while the Libertarians did not contest the election as they had done in 2017.

== Results ==
2022 Dumfries and Galloway Council election result
Party	Seats	Gains	Losses	Net gain/loss	Seats %	Votes %	Votes	+/−
Conservative	16	1	1	Steady	37.2	38.8	21,462	▲1.6
SNP	11	0	0	Steady	25.6	28.2	15,602	▲7.5
Labour	9	1	3	▼2	20.9	16.6	9,169	▼1.1
Independent	6	3	1	▲2	13.9	8.6	4,762	▼11.4
Liberal Democrats	1	0	0	Steady	2.3	3.3	1,810	▲0.9
Green	0	0	0	Steady	0.0	4.5	2,496	▲2.7
Alba	0	0	0	Steady	0.0	0.1	68	New
Total	43						55,369	

Note: Votes are the sum of first preference votes across all council wards. The net gain/loss and percentage changes relate to the result of the previous Scottish local elections on 4 May 2017. This is because STV has an element of proportionality which is not present unless multiple seats are being elected. This may differ from other published sources showing gain/loss relative to seats held at the dissolution of Scotland's councils.

=== Ward summary ===
Results of the 2022 Dumfries and Galloway Council election by ward
Ward	%	Cllrs	%	Cllrs	%	Cllrs	%	Cllrs	%	Cllrs	%	Cllrs	Total Cllrs
Ward	Conservative		SNP		Labour		Independent		Lib Dem		Others		Total Cllrs
Stranraer and the Rhins	44.8	2	23.3	1	9.9	0	24.1	1			2.6	0	4
Mid Galloway and Wigtown West	50.2	2	30.3	1	11.3	1					8.2	0	4
Dee and Glenkens	38.0	1	25.4	1	6.1	0	14.6	1	4.5	0	11.3	0	3
Castle Douglas and Crocketford	35.6	1	25.1	1	6.0	0	19.6	1	7.8	0	6	0	3
Abbey	36.7	1	31.1	1	25.9	1			6.3	0			3
North West Dumfries	28.4	1	39.5	1	27.2	2					4.8	0	4
Mid and Upper Nithsdale	30.7	1	29.2	0	12.7	0	27.4	1					3
Lochar	39.8	2	33.6	1	29.1	1					4.8	0	4
Nith	28.3	1	33.4	1	23.8	1	9.7	1			4.8	0	4
Annandale South	38.3	1	21.6	1	19.1	1			17.7	1	3.3	0	4
Annandale North	50.3	2	30.0	1	13.9	1					5.8	0	4
Annandale East and Eskdale	42.7	1	14.5	0	21.4	1	15.4	1	3.3	0	2.6	0	3
Total	38.8	16	28.2	11	16.6	9	8.6	6	3.3	1	4.6	0	43

=== Seats changing hands ===
Below is a list of seats which elected a different party or parties from 2017 in order to highlight the change in political composition of the council from the previous election. The list does not include defeated incumbents who resigned or defected from their party and subsequently failed re-election while the party held the seat.

Seats changing hands
Seat	2017		2022	
Seat	Party	Member	Party	Member
Stranraer and the Rhins	Labour	Tommy Sloan	Conservative	Chrissie Hill
Mid Galloway and Wigtown West	Independent	Jim McColm	Labour	Sandy Whitelaw
Mid and Upper Nithsdale	Labour	Jim Dempster	Independent	Jim Dempster
Nith	Labour	John Martin	Independent	David Slater
Annandale East and Eskdale	Conservative	Ronnie Tait	Independent	Denis Male

Notes

1. Note 1: In 2017, Tommy Sloan was elected as a Labour candidate but was later suspended by the party.
2. Note 2: In 2017, Cllr Dempster was elected as a Labour candidate but was later suspended by the party.

== Ward results ==
=== Stranraer and the Rhins ===
The Conservatives, the SNP and independent councillor Willie Scobie retained the seats they had won at the previous election while the Conservatives gained a seat from Labour. Independent candidate Tommy Sloan was elected as a Labour candidate in 2017 but later resigned from the party.

Stranraer and the Rhins - 4 seats
Party	Candidate	FPv%	Count						
Party	Candidate	FPv%	1	2	3	4	5	6	7
Conservative	Andrew Giusti (incumbent)	32.8	1,518						
SNP	Ben Dashper	23.3	1,074						
Independent	Willie Scobie (incumbent)	22.8	1,051						
Labour	John McCutcheon	9.9	458	478	511	523	582	660	
Conservative	Chrissie Hill	7.3	338	804	806	816	833	861	1,025
Green	Peter Barlow	2.6	120	126	180	187			
Independent	Tommy Sloan (incumbent)	1.3	59	98	118	198	239		
Electorate: 11,398 Valid: 4,618 Spoilt: 108 Quota: 924 Turnout: 41.5%

=== Mid Galloway and Wigtown West ===
The Conservatives (2) and the SNP (1) retained the seats they had won at the previous election while Labour gained a seat from former independent councillor Jim McColm.

Mid Galloway and Wigtown West - 4 seats
Party	Candidate	FPv%	Count				
Party	Candidate	FPv%	1	2	3	4	5
Conservative	David Inglis (incumbent)	30.8	1,529				
SNP	Katie Hagmann (incumbent)	30.3	1,505				
Conservative	Jackie McCamon	19.4	964	1,428			
Labour	Sandy Whitelaw	11.3	559	578	681	806	1,240
Green	Kenny Campbell	8.2	405	415	690	736	
Electorate: 10,908 Valid: 4,962 Spoilt: 98 Quota: 993 Turnout: 46.4%

=== Dee and Glenkens ===
The Conservatives and the SNP held the seats they won at the previous election while independent candidate Dougie Campbell gained a seat from former independent councillor Jane Maitland. In 2017, Cllr Campbell was elected as an SNP candidate but later resigned from the party. He was re-elected as an independent candidate.

Dee and Glenkens - 3 seats
Party	Candidate	FPv%	Count					
Party	Candidate	FPv%	1	2	3	4	5	6
SNP	Andy McFarlane	25.4	1,139					
Conservative	John Denerley	20.3	912	912	927	942	963	1,603
Conservative	Susan Murdoch	17.6	791	791	801	835	859	
Independent	Dougie Campbell (incumbent)	14.6	655	657	721	809	1,108	1,227
Green	Laura Moodie	11.3	508	517	556	651		
Labour	Graham Trickey	6.0	271	272	320			
Independent	Anthony Bird	4.5	202	203				
Electorate: 8,406 Valid: 4,478 Spoilt: 51 Quota: 1,120 Turnout: 53.9%

=== Castle Douglas and Crocketford ===
The Conservatives, the SNP and independent councillor Iain Howie retained the seats they had won at the previous election.

Castle Douglas and Crocketford - 3 seats
Party	Candidate	FPv%	Count							
Party	Candidate	FPv%	1	2	3	4	5	6	7	8
Conservative	Pauline Drysdale	30.2	1,220							
SNP	John Young (incumbent)	25.1	1,012							
Independent	Iain Howie (incumbent)	10.0	403	425	425	468	521	582	827	1,115
Independent	Gill Dykes	9.6	386	409	409	432	463	550		
Liberal Democrats	Iain McDonald	7.8	313	329	329	382	495	553	633	
Green	Liz Ashburn	6.0	243	244	245					
Labour	Keith Heron	6.0	241	246	247	316				
Conservative	Iain Kennedy-Moffat	5.3	215	341	341	349	361			
Electorate: 7,751 Valid: 4,033 Spoilt: 59 Quota: 1,009 Turnout: 52.8%

=== Abbey ===
The Conservatives, the SNP and Labour retained the seats they had won at the previous election.

Abbey - 3 seats
Party	Candidate	FPv%	Count		
Party	Candidate	FPv%	1	2	3
SNP	Kim Lowe	31.1	1,267		
Labour	Davie Stitt (incumbent)	25.9	1,053		
Conservative	Ian Blake (incumbent)	24.6	1,005	1,014	1,020
Conservative	Robin Wishart	12.0	489	493	496
Liberal Democrats	Matthew Pumphrey	6.3	256	375	390
Electorate: 8,592 Valid: 4,070 Spoilt: 76 Quota: 1,018 Turnout: 48.3%

=== North West Dumfries ===
Labour (2), the SNP (1) and the Conservatives (1) retained the seats they had won at the previous election.

North West Dumfries - 4 seats
Party	Candidate	FPv%	Count				
Party	Candidate	FPv%	1	2	3	4	5
SNP	Andy Ferguson (incumbent)	39.5	1,561				
Conservative	Graham Bell (incumbent)	28.4	1,123				
Labour	Emma Jordan	18.4	728	919			
Labour	Paula Stevenson	8.8	347	404	495	607	909
Green	Ann Johnstone	4.8	191	526	571	579	
Electorate: 10,203 Valid: 3,950 Spoilt: 62 Quota: 791 Turnout: 39.3%

=== Mid and Upper Nithsdale ===
The SNP and the Conservatives retained the seats they had won at the previous election while independent candidate Jim Dempster gained a seat from Labour. In 2017, Cllr Dempster was elected as a Labour candidate but was later suspended by the party. He was re-elected as an independent candidate.

Mid and Upper Nithsdale - 3 seats
Party	Candidate	FPv%	Count			
Party	Candidate	FPv%	1	2	3	4
SNP	Tony Berretti	29.2	1,161			
Independent	Jim H. Dempster (incumbent)	27.4	1,087			
Conservative	Andrew S. Wood (incumbent)	15.8	629	631	642	1,139
Conservative	Kyle Thornton	14.8	591	596	612	
Labour	Callum Jamieson	12.7	504	595	630	664
Electorate: 8,242 Valid: 3,972 Spoilt: 46 Quota: 994 Turnout: 48.8%

=== Lochar ===
The Conservatives (2), the SNP (1) and Labour (1) retained the seats they had won at the previous election.

Lochar - 4 seats
Party	Candidate	FPv%	Count			
Party	Candidate	FPv%	1	2	3	4
SNP	Tracey Little (incumbent)	33.7	1,787			
Conservative	Ivor Hyslop (incumbent)	25.4	1,348			
Labour	Linda Dorward	21.6	1,146			
Conservative	Maureen Johnstone	14.5	772	810	1,058	1,078
Green	Sandy Rogerson	4.8	253	733	740	
Electorate: 11,299 Valid: 5,306 Spoilt: 60 Quota: 1,016 Turnout: 47.7%

=== Nith ===
The SNP and the Conservatives retained the seats they had won at the previous election while Labour retained one of the two seats and independent candidate Robert Slater gained a seat from Labour.

Nith - 4 seats
Party	Candidate	FPv%	Count						
Party	Candidate	FPv%	1	2	3	4	5	6	7
SNP	John Campbell (incumbent)	33.3	1,670						
Conservative	Malcolm Johnstone (incumbent)	18.0	904	920	923	937	1,386		
Labour	Keith Walters	16.7	835	949	1,291				
Conservative	Alastair Muir	10.2	515	521	523	539			
Independent	David R. Slater	9.7	488	546	562	621	642	785	1,029
Labour	Angie Whitelaw	7.1	355	409					
Green	Ann McLauchlan	4.8	240	540	559	624	629	655	
Electorate: 10,573 Valid: 5,007 Spoilt: 72 Quota: 1,002 Turnout: 48.0%

=== Annandale South ===
The Conservatives, the SNP, Labour and the Liberal Democrats retained the seats they had won at the previous election.

Annandale South - 4 seats
Party	Candidate	FPv%	Count					
Party	Candidate	FPv%	1	2	3	4	5	6
Conservative	Ian Carruthers (incumbent)	21.9	1,118					
SNP	George Jamieson	21.6	1,104					
Labour	Sean W. Marshall (incumbent)	19.1	975	982	1,003	1,063		
Liberal Democrats	Richard Brodie (incumbent)	17.7	902	911	924	995	1,017	1,396
Conservative	Alan Weild	16.4	839	909	910	921	926	
Green	Cameron Garrett	3.3	166	166	195			
Electorate: 11,245 Valid: 5,104 Spoilt: 94 Quota: 1,021 Turnout: 46.2%

=== Annandale North ===
The Conservatives (2), the SNP (1) and Labour (1) retained the seats they had won at the previous election.

Annandale North - 4 seats
Party	Candidate	FPv%	Count				
Party	Candidate	FPv%	1	2	3	4	5
SNP	Stephen Thompson (incumbent)	30.1	1,725				
Conservative	Gail MacGregor (incumbent)	20.0	1,153				
Conservative	Lynne Davis	19.4	1,114	1,134	1,135	1,142	1,165
Labour	Carolyne Wilson	13.9	797	951	951	973	1,266
Conservative	Doug Fairbairn (incumbent)	10.8	621	634	636	638	647
Green	Jennifer Norris	4.6	263	487	487	548	
Alba	Marion Collins	1.2	68	123	123		
Electorate: 11,910 Valid: 5,741 Spoilt: 74 Quota: 1,149 Turnout: 48.8%

=== Annandale East and Eskdale ===
Labour retained the seat they had won at the previous election while the Conservatives retained one of their two seats and lost one to independent candidate Denis Male.

Annandale East and Eskdale - 3 seats
Party	Candidate	FPv%	Count						
Party	Candidate	FPv%	1	2	3	4	5	6	7
Conservative	Karen Carruthers (incumbent)	27.7	1,140						
Labour	Archie Dryburgh (incumbent)	21.4	880	888	908	973	1,260		
Independent	Denis Male	15.4	633	639	649	687	724	875	1,190
Conservative	Ron Tait (incumbent)	14.9	614	693	699	712	724	751	
SNP	Sylvia Willmot	14.5	597	597	640	660			
Liberal Democrats	Kirsten Herbst-Gray	3.3	137	141	159				
Green	Stephen Mattock	2.6	107	108					
Electorate: 8,699 Valid: 4,108 Spoilt: 82 Quota: 1,028 Turnout: 48.2%

== Aftermath ==
Despite winning the most seats for the second consecutive election, the Conservatives remained in opposition. A coalition of SNP, Labour, independent and Liberal Democrat councillors – dubbed a "rainbow coalition" in the media including by the BBC - came together to run the council. Former Labour and SNP group leaders Elaine Murray and Rob Davidson stood down at the 2022 election. They were replaced in the roles by Cllr Linda Dorward and Cllr Stephen Thompson respectively. Cllr Dorward and Cllr Thompson were elected as co-leaders of the council. The Conservatives were brought into the leadership fold in June 2022 when cross-party panels were created.

In July 2022, Scottish Labour leader Anas Sarwar claimed that the coalition was an interim arrangement and "not for the duration of the entire council term". In response, South Scotland MSP Emma Harper urged Sarwar not to "ruin arrangements" between councillors in Dumfries and Galloway.

Ultimately, the coalition agreement in full lasted only eight months after Labour left the council leadership citing "clear political and policy differences" in February 2023. Cllr Dorward quit as co-leader leaving Cllr Thomson as leader of the council. Lib Dem councillor Richard Brodie was selected as deputy council leader. The Conservatives attempted to take control of the council by proposing group leader Cllr Gail MacGregor as council leader but the move failed by 26 votes to 16. MacGregor described the rainbow coalition as having "thunderclouds surrounding it" and that it seemed to be in "disarray".

In March 2023, the coalition collapsed after Labour abstentions coupled with independent and Lib Dem support for the Conservatives on budget motions saw the Conservative budget pass. As a result, Cllr Thompson resigned after his position had become untenable. One week later, Cllr MacGregor was elected as council leader as the Conservatives took control of the council with support from independent and Lib Dem councillors. Independent councillor Dougie Campbell blamed the collapse of the coalition on the "irresponsible" behaviour of the Labour group and "interference" from party headquarters.

During 2024, Cllr John Denerley became an independent councillor and was no longer part of the Conservatives.

Just over two years into the Conservative regime, seven councillors quit the party following a row over the direction of the administration. Four of them – Cllrs Andrew Giusti, Chrissie Hill, David Inglis and Richard Marsh – formed a new political grouping on the council called Novantae. The other three, Cllrs Ian Carruthers, Karen Carruthers and Andrew Wood, formed a separate independent group. A fortnight later, the Conservative administration collapsed after Cllr MacGregor stepped down as council leader in the midst of a no-confidence vote. The SNP took back control of the council and Cllr Thompson was re-elected council leader.

=== Mid Galloway and Wigtown West by-election ===
In October 2022, Sandy Whitelaw, Labour councillor for Mid Galloway and Wigtown West, resigned for personal reasons. A by-election was held on 8 December 2022 and was won by Conservative candidate Richard Marsh.

Mid Galloway and Wigtown West by-election (8 December 2022) - 1 seat
Party	Candidate	FPv%	Count
Party	Candidate	FPv%	1
Conservative	Richard Marsh	52.8	1,787
SNP	Ian Gibson	26.0	879
Labour	John McCutcheon	9.6	326
Liberal Democrats	Iain McDonald	5.6	190
Green	Daniel Hooper-Jones	5.1	172
Electorate: 10,981 Valid: 3,354 Spoilt: 26 Quota: 1,678 Turnout: 30.8%

=== Stranraer and the Rhins by-election ===
In September 2025, Willie Scobie, long-serving independent councillor for Stranraer and the Rhins, resigned for health reasons. A by-election was held on 20 November 2025 and was won by Conservative candidate Julie Currie.

Stranraer and the Rhins by-election (20 November 2025) - 1 seat
Party	Candidate	FPv%	Count						
Party	Candidate	FPv%	1	2	3	4	5	6	7
Reform	John Roberts	34.4	1,386	1,391	1,399	1,403	1,429	1,455	1,523
Conservative	Julie Currie	33.5	1,302	1,305	1,321	1,330	1,375	1,417	1,565
SNP	Simon Jones	13.9	541	545	554	612	659	730	
Labour	John McCutcheon	6.1	239	242	258	283	311		
Independent	Shaun Smith	5.3	207	208	220	239			
Green	Michael Havard	3.6	141	142	158				
Liberal Democrats	Tracey Warman	2.5	96	98					
Heritage	Gisele Skinner	0.7	27						
Electorate: 11,573 Valid: 3,939 Spoilt: 29 Quota: 1,971 Turnout: 34.3%
