= Dee and Glenkens (ward) =

Electoral ward in Dumfries and Galloway, Scotland

- Dumfries and Galloway
- Boundary of Dee and Glenkens in Dumfries and Galloway from 2017.
- Population: 10,594 (2021)
- Electorate: 8,406 (2022)
- Major settlements: Kirkcudbright
- Scottish Parliament constituency: Galloway and West Dumfries
- Scottish Parliament region: South Scotland
- UK Parliament constituency: Dumfries and Galloway

Current ward
- Created: 2017
- Number of councillors: 3
- Councillor: Andy McFarlane (SNP)
- Councillor: John Denerley (Conservative)
- Councillor: Dougie Campbell (Independent)
- Created from: Castle Douglas and Glenkens; Dee

Dee and Glenkens is one of the twelve electoral wards of Dumfries and Galloway Council. Created in 2017, the ward elects three councillors using the single transferable vote electoral system and covers an area with a population of 10,594 people.

The area has produced strong results for the Conservatives who have won more than a third of the vote at each election.

== Boundaries ==
The ward was created by the Local Government Boundary Commission for Scotland following the Fifth Statutory Reviews of Electoral Arrangements ahead of the 2017 Scottish local elections. Five of the 13 multi-member wards in Dumfries and Galloway were abolished as a result of the review and replaced by four new ones. Dee and Glenkens encompasses an area represented by the former Dee and Castle Douglas and Glenkens wards. The ward takes in an area in the centre of the council area from the boundary with East Ayrshire at Loch Doon to Kirkcudbright Bay in the Irish Sea and the Solway Firth. It is situated within Galloway and takes in part of the historic county of Kirkcudbrightshire. The ward includes the towns of Kirkcudbright, St John's Town of Dalry, New Galloway and Gatehouse of Fleet as well as the villages of Carsphairn, Balmaclellan, Laurieston, Ringford, Twynholm, Dundrennan and Auchencairn. The ward takes its name from The Glenkens – an area within the historic county of Kirkcudbrightshire centred around the River Ken and Loch Ken – and the River Dee which flows through the south of the ward.

== Councillors ==
Election	Councillors		
2017	Patsy Gilroy (Conservative)	Dougie Campbell (SNP/Ind.)	Jane Maitland (Ind.)
2022	John Denerley (Conservative)	Dougie Campbell (SNP/Ind.)	Andy McFarlane (SNP)

== Election results ==
=== 2022 election ===
Dee and Glenkens - 3 seats
Party	Candidate	FPv%	Count					
Party	Candidate	FPv%	1	2	3	4	5	6
SNP	Andy McFarlane	25.4	1,139					
Conservative	John Denerley	20.3	912	912	927	942	963	1,603
Conservative	Susan Murdoch	17.6	791	791	801	835	859	
Independent	Dougie Campbell (incumbent)	14.6	655	657	721	809	1,108	1,227
Green	Laura Moodie	11.3	508	517	556	651		
Labour	Graham Trickey	6.0	271	272	320			
Independent	Anthony Bird	4.5	202	203				
Electorate: 8,406 Valid: 4,478 Spoilt: 51 Quota: 1,120 Turnout: 53.9%

=== 2017 election ===
2017 Dumfries and Galloway Council election

Dee and Glenkens- 3 seats
Party	Candidate	FPv%	Count							
Party	Candidate	FPv%	1	2	3	4	5	6	7	8
Conservative	Patsy Gilroy (incumbent)†	33.47	1,547							
SNP	Dougie Campbell	19.56	904	909.31	916.81	921.32	934.82	967.08	1,121.83	1,250.09
Independent	Douglas Swan	15.84	732	788.11	804.12	817.64	844.2	886.49	925.55	
Independent	Jane Maitland (incumbent)	14.37	664	824.49	833.27	850.57	937.7	983.26	1,096.79	1,522.66
Green	Laura Moodie	6.32	292	303.88	305.88	321.67	333.43	402.21		
Labour	Elizabeth Maxwell	4.69	217	237.72	238.98	258.26	262.28			
Independent	Andi Holmes	2.60	120	144.52	157.28	174.57				
Liberal Democrats	Andrew Metcalf	1.84	85	106.74	111.99					
No description	John Thorn	1.32	61	70.6						
Electorate: 8,239 Valid: 4,622 Spoilt: 34 Quota: 1,156 Turnout: 56.5
