= 2012 Dumfries and Galloway Council election =

Local election in Scotland

← 2007	3 May 2012	2017 →

All 47 seats to Dumfries and Galloway Council 24 seats needed for a majority
	First party	Second party	Third party
Leader	Ronnie Nicholson	Ivor Alexander Hyslop	Brian Collins
Party	Labour	Conservative	SNP
Leader's seat	North West Dumfries	Lochar	Castle Douglas and Glenkens
Last election	14 seats, 29.8%	18 seats, 38.3%	10 seats, 21.3%
Seats before	17	17	10
Seats won	15	14	10
Seat change	▲1	▼4	Steady
Popular vote	14,828	13,446	9,837
Percentage	29.3%	26.6%	19.5%
Swing	▲1.2%	▼5.6%	▲0.5%
	Fourth party	Fifth party
Leader	Jane S. Maitland	Richard John Brodie
Party	Independent	Liberal Democrats
Leader's seat	Dee	Annandale South
Last election	2 seats, 4.3%	3 seats, 6.4%
Seats before	2	3
Seats won	7	1
Seat change	▲5	▼2
Popular vote	9,126	1,997
Percentage	18.1%	4.0%
Swing	▲6.9%	▼4.3%
- The 12 multi-member wards
Council Leader before election
Ivor Alexander Hyslop
Conservative
Council Leader after election
Ivor Alexander Hyslop
Conservative

The 2012 Dumfries and Galloway Council election took place on 3 May 2012 to elect members of Dumfries and Galloway Council. The election used the thirteen wards created as a result of the Local Governance (Scotland) Act 2004, with each ward electing three or four councillors using the single transferable vote system form of proportional representation, with 47 councillors being elected.

The election saw Labour replace the Conservatives as the largest party on the council as they gained 1 seat while the Conservatives lost 4 seats. The Scottish National Party retained their third place on the authority but did not gain any additional seats. Independents proved to be the biggest winners as they returned to the council with 7 seats and 5 net gains which included 2 former members of the Labour party. The Liberal Democrats proved to be the worst performers of the election, being reduced to just a single seat.

Following the election the Conservative Party formed a coalition with the support of the SNP. This replaced the previous Conservative-Lib Dem coalition which existed from 2007 to 2012.

== Results ==
2012 Dumfries and Galloway Council election result
Party	Seats	Gains	Losses	Net gain/loss	Seats %	Votes %	Votes	+/−
Labour	15	2	1	▲1	31.9	29.3	14,828	▲1.2
Conservative	14	0	4	▼4	29.8	26.6	13,446	▼5.6
SNP	10	1	1	Steady	21.3	19.5	9,837	▲0.5
Independent	7	5	0	▲5	14.9	18.1	9,126	▲6.9
Liberal Democrats	1	0	2	▼2	2.1	4.0	1,997	▼4.3
Green	0	0	0	Steady	0.0	1.8	932	▲0.8
UKIP	0	0	0	Steady	0.0	0.7	372	▲0.4

Note: "Votes" are the first preference votes. The net gain/loss and percentage changes relate to the result of the previous Scottish local elections on 3 May 2007. This may differ from other published sources showing gain/loss relative to seats held at dissolution of Scotland's councils.

== Ward results ==
=== Stranraer and North Rhins ===
- 2007: 1xLab; 1xCon; 1xSNP
- 2012: 1xIndependent; 1xSNP; 1xLab
- 2007-2012 Change: Independent gain one seat from Con

Stranraer and North Rhins – 3 seats
Party	Candidate	FPv%	Count		
Party	Candidate	FPv%	1	2	3
Independent	Willie Scobie (incumbent)	62.15	2,057		
Conservative	John Dougan (incumbent)	15.02	497	643.9	
SNP	Iain Dick (incumbent)	13.60	450	678.8	836.62
Labour	Marion McCutcheon	9.24	306	679.4	808.2
Electorate: 7,185 Valid: 3,310 Spoilt: 38 Quota: 828 Turnout: 3,348 (46.07%)

=== Wigtown West ===
- 2007: 1xSNP; 1xLab; 1xCon
- 2012: 1xIndependent; 1xSNP; 1xCon
- 2007-2012 Change: Independent gain one seat from Lab

Wigtown West – 3 seats
Party	Candidate	FPv%	Count			
Party	Candidate	FPv%	1	2	3	4
Independent	Grahame Forster (incumbent)	45.1	1,330			
SNP	Jim McClung	25.13	741			
Conservative	Roberta Tuckfield (incumbent)††	16.11	475	643.3	643.7	859.3
Labour	John McCutcheon	13.67	403	585.5	586.7	
Electorate: 6,753 Valid: 2,949 Spoilt: 26 Quota: 738 Turnout: 2,975 (43.67%)

=== Mid Galloway ===
- 2007: 1xSNP; 1xCon; 1xLib Dem
- 2012: 1xSNP; 1xIndependent; 1xCon
- 2007-2012 Change: Independent gain one seat from Lib Dem

Mid Galloway – 3 seats
Party	Candidate	FPv%	Count					
Party	Candidate	FPv%	1	2	3	4	5	6
SNP	Alistair Geddes (incumbent)	29.66	1,027					
Independent	Jim McColm	28.68	993					
Conservative	Graham Nicol (incumbent)	18.6	644	665.6	699.2	776.2	819.6	948.2
Labour	Heather Meldrum	13.6	471	495.5	523.4	530.7	612.5	
SNP	Doug Snell *	6.56	227	301.9	318.7	324.2		
Conservative	Sheila Stewart	2.89	100	106.9	120.2			
Electorate: 7,539 Valid: 3,462 Spoilt: 49 Quota: 866 Turnout: 3,511 (45.92%)

- = Sitting Councillor for a different Ward.

=== Dee ===
- 2007: 1xCon; 1xIndependent; 1xSNP
- 2012: 2xIndependent; 1xCon
- 2007-2012 Change: Independent gain one seat from SNP

Dee – 3 seats
Party	Candidate	FPv%	Count							
Party	Candidate	FPv%	1	2	3	4	5	6	7	8
Independent	Colin Wyper	36.51	1,473							
Independent	Jane Maitland (incumbent)	18.39	742	815.4	849.4	889.9	956.9	1,055.2		
Conservative	Patsy Gilroy (incumbent)	18.05	728	780.9	795.4	801.3	831.9	849.4	868.4	1,021.2
SNP	Thomas Jacques (incumbent)	11.48	463	525.4	536.2	567.4	600.3	693.6	701.6	
Labour	Marsali Caig	7.06	285	355.6	369.2	386.4	422.2			
Independent	Franca Bruno	3.5	141	181.9	196.7	220.3				
Green	James Smyth	2.85	115	127.9	140.5					
Liberal Democrats	John Womersley	2.16	87	116.3						
Electorate: 7,373 Valid: 4,034 Spoilt: 38 Quota: 1,009 Turnout: 4,072 (54.71%)

=== Castle Douglas and Glenkens ===
- 2007: 1xCon; 1xSNP; 1xIndependent
- 2012: 1xCon; 1xIndependent; 1xSNP
- 2007-2012 Change: No change

Castle Douglas and Glenkens – 3 seats
Party	Candidate	FPv%	Count				
Party	Candidate	FPv%	1	2	3	4	5
Conservative	Finlay Carson	27.08	904				
Independent	George Nicol Prentice (incumbent)	23.88	797	813	826.5		
SNP	Brian Collins (incumbent)	23.88	797	800	811.2	811.5	899.6
Labour	Daniel Scheffer	10.04	335	350.6	376.8	376.9	430.9
Green	Paul Taylorson	6.05	202	203.2	229.4	229.6	
Conservative	Gary Wardell	5.90	197	235	249.9	250.2	265
Liberal Democrats	Andrew Metcalf	3.18	106	109			
Electorate: 8,014 Valid: 3,338 Spoilt: 34 Quota: 835 Turnout: 3,372 (41.65%)

=== Abbey ===
- 2007: 2xCon; 1xSNP; 1xLab
- 2012: 2xLab; 1xCon; 1xSNP
- 2007-2012 Change: Lab gain one seat from Con

Abbey – 4 seats
Party	Candidate	FPv%	Count	
Party	Candidate	FPv%	1	2
Labour	Tom McAughtrie (incumbent)	22.95	903	
Conservative	Ian Blake (incumbent)	21.75	856	
SNP	Rob Davidson (incumbent)	20.69	814	
Labour	Davie Stitt (incumbent)	19.9	783	870.2
Conservative	Charles Milroy	10.29	405	411.1
UKIP	Bill Wright	4.42	174	178.6
Electorate: 9,019 Valid: 3,935 Spoilt: 65 Quota: 788 Turnout: 4,000 (43.63%)

=== North West Dumfries ===
- 2007: 2xLab; 1xCon; 1xSNP
- 2012: 2xLab; 1xCon; 1xSNP
- 2007-2012 Change: No change

North West Dumfries – 4 seats
Party	Candidate	FPv%	Count				
Party	Candidate	FPv%	1	2	3	4	5
Labour	Ronnie Nicholson (incumbent)	23.25	932				
Conservative	John Graham Bell (incumbent)††	22.43	899				
Labour	David John McKie (incumbent)	21.38	857				
SNP	Andy Ferguson	18.44	739	746.1	768.5	773.2	982.1
Labour	Paula Stevenson	14.50	581	690.1	702.2	746.7	
Electorate: 9,906 Valid: 4,008 Spoilt: 66 Quota: 802 Turnout: 4,074 (40.46%)

=== Mid and Upper Nithsdale ===
- 2007: 2xLab; 1xCon; 1xSNP
- 2012: 2xLab; 1xCon; 1xSNP
- 2007-2012 Change: No change

Mid and Upper Nithsdale – 4 seats
Party	Candidate	FPv%	Count	
Party	Candidate	FPv%	1	2
Labour	Jim Dempster (incumbent)	27.45	1,194	
Conservative	Gill Dykes (incumbent)	26.53	1,154	
SNP	Andrew Stuart Wood (incumbent)	20.51	892	
Labour	John Syme (incumbent)	19.08	830	1,098.6
UKIP	Douglas Watters	4.55	198	209.1
Conservative	Elly Hurren	1.86	81	88.3
Electorate: 9,239 Valid: 4,349 Spoilt: 67 Quota: 870 Turnout: 4,416 (47.07%)

=== Lochar ===
- 2007: 2xCon; 1xLab; 1xSNP
- 2012: 2xLab; 1xSNP; 1xCon
- 2007-2012 Change: Lab gain one seat from Con

Lochar – 4 seats
Party	Candidate	FPv%	Count				
Party	Candidate	FPv%	1	2	3	4	5
SNP	Yen Hongmei Jin††††	28.46	1,190				
Labour	Jeff Leaver (incumbent)	27.73	1,159				
Conservative	Ivor Alexander Hyslop (incumbent)	15.86	663	703	710.5	723.7	1,266.4
Conservative	John Anthony Charteris (incumbent)	15.05	629	675.9	685.6	700.3	
Labour	Ted Thompson	12.89	539	660	941.7		
Electorate: 9,295 Valid: 4,180 Spoilt: 62 Quota: 837 Turnout: 4,242 (44.97%)

=== Nith ===
- 2007: 2xLab; 1xSNP; 1xCon
- 2012: 2xLab; 1xSNP; 1xCon
- 2007-2012 Change: No change

Nith – 4 seats
Party	Candidate	FPv%	Count						
Party	Candidate	FPv%	1	2	3	4	5	6	7
Labour	John Allan Martin (incumbent)	25.93	1,079						
Labour	Colin Smyth (incumbent)	19.20	799	1,010.3					
SNP	Alastair Witts (incumbent)	18.84	784	789.7	822	830.2	850.9		
Conservative	Jack Groom (incumbent)††	15.67	652	657.5	669.5	675.9	687.8	689.9	900.9
Conservative	David Slater	8.56	356	361	366.5	369.5	382.5	383.6	
Independent	Andrew Crosbie	8.36	348	352.8	376.2	391.6	430.4	435.1	514.1
Independent	Nello Paoletti	2.19	91	93.1	103.1	108.4			
Independent	Lee Vann-Wakelin	1.25	52	53.6	59.81				
Electorate: 9,844 Valid: 4,161 Spoilt: 66 Quota: 833 Turnout: 4,227 (42.27%)

=== Annandale South ===
- 2007: 2xLab; 1xLib Dem; 1xCon
- 2012: 2xLab; 1xLib Dem; 1xCon
- 2007-2012 Change: No change

Annandale South – 4 seats
Party	Candidate	FPv%	Count					
Party	Candidate	FPv%	1	2	3	4	5	6
Liberal Democrats	Richard John Brodie (incumbent)	21.09	959					
Labour	Sean William Marshall (incumbent)	19.55	889	901.3	903.3	905.7	1,005.7	
Conservative	Ian Brian Carruthers (incumbent)††	19.38	881	889.6	933			
Labour	Ronnie Ogilvie (incumbent)	16.74	761	764.6	766.7	767.4	842.6	916.3
SNP	Andrew Wilson	12.49	568	573.9	577	578.9	664.9	670.9
Independent	Marion F.B. Stewart	9.15	416	424.7	432.9	438.6		
Conservative	Brian Pope	1.61	73	73.9				
Electorate: 10,864 Valid: 4,547 Spoilt: 55 Quota: 910 Turnout: 4,602 (41.85%)

=== Annandale North ===
- 2007: 2xCon; 1xLab; 1xLib Dem
- 2012: 2xCon; 1xLab; 1xSNP
- 2007-2012 Change: SNP gain one seat from Lib Dem

Annandale North – 4 seats
Party	Candidate	FPv%	Count						
Party	Candidate	FPv%	1	2	3	4	5	6	7
Labour	Ted Brown (incumbent)†	19.59	845	923					
SNP	Stephen Thompson	16.78	724	768	782.5	796.9	799.1	800.4	1,067.9
Conservative	Peter Diggle††	15.11	652	690	693.1	875.4			
Green	Alis Ballance	14.26	615	673	687.3	755.7	759.4	761.4	
Conservative	Gail MacGregor (incumbent)	13.07	564	641	645.5	885.3			
Conservative	Roger Brian Grant (incumbent)	12.31	531	566	568.7				
Liberal Democrats	Hugh Young	8.88	383						
Electorate: 10,175 Valid: 4,314 Spoilt: 34 Quota: 863 Turnout: 4,348 (42.4%)

=== Annandale East and Eskdale ===
- 2007: 3xCon; 1xLab
- 2012: 2xCon; 1xLab; 1xIndependent
- 2007-2012 Change: Independent gain one seat from Con

Annandale East and Eskdale – 4 seats
Party	Candidate	FPv%	Count							
Party	Candidate	FPv%	1	2	3	4	5	6	7	8
Labour	Archie Dryburgh (incumbent)	22.20	877							
Conservative	Denis Raymond Male (incumbent)	15.29	604	609.8	609.8	618.9	732.3	778.3	778.9	963.2
Independent	Craig Peacock	14.98	592	607.3	621.9	654.9	716.8	797.1		
Conservative	Karen Carruthers††	13.92	550	554.8	554.8	560.8	661.2	690.9	691.6	808.4
Liberal Democrats	Jock Dinwoodie	11.69	462	473.8	479.5	483.7	513.4	587.8	588.9	
SNP	Brian Richardson	10.66	421	430.2	434.4	436.8	447			
Conservative	Stuart Thompson	8.88	351	353.3	356.6	363.9				
Independent	Allan Graham (incumbent)	1.24	49	52.2	68.8					
Independent	Sidney John Elder	1.14	45	50.2						
Electorate: 9,663 Valid: 3,951 Spoilt: 36 Quota: 791 Turnout: 4,348 (40.89%)

== Aftermath ==
On 20 September 2013, 6 councillors of the Conservative Party quit their group and became independents.

In August 2015 Lochar SNP councillor Yen Hongmei Jin resigned from the party and became an independent, citing racial prejudice towards her and having lost out at a candidate selection for the Scottish Parliament election, 2016.

=== By-elections ===
==== Annandale North by-election (2012) ====
Annandale North Labour councillor Ted Brown died on 4 September 2012. A by-election was held on 15 November 2012 which was won by Graeme Tait of the Scottish Conservative and Unionist Party.

Annandale North by-election (15 November 2012) – 1 seat
Party	Candidate	FPv%	Count			
Party	Candidate	FPv%	1	2	3	4
Conservative	Graeme Tait†††	46.0	1,819	1,857	1,922	1,980
Labour	Peter Glanton	25.3	1,002	1,008	1,053	1,149
Green	Alis Ballance	11.7	464	475	508	617
SNP	Frank MacGregor	9.4	371	375	399	
Liberal Democrats	Hugh Young	5.3	208	211		
UKIP	Bill Wright	2.3	89			
Conservative gain from Labour		Swing				
Valid: 3,953 Spoilt: 27 Quota: 1,977 Turnout: 3,980

==== Annandale North by-election (2016) ====
Annandale North Conservative councillor Graeme Tait announced on 20 March 2014 that he had defected to the Labour Party stating that he felt its "policies and values" better reflect his own and resigned his Council seat on 22 September 2016. A by-election was held on 17 November 2016 and was won by the Conservative Party's Douglas Fairbairn.

Annandale North by-election (17 November 2016) – 1 seat
Party	Candidate	FPv%	Count
Party	Candidate	FPv%	1
Conservative	Douglas Fairbairn	57.4	2,041
SNP	Sylvia Moffat	21.1	749
Labour	Adam Wilson	17.2	611
Green	Chris Ballance	4.3	152
Conservative hold		Swing	
Valid: 3,553 Spoilt: 35
