= 2017 Dumfries and Galloway Council election =

2017 Scottish local government election

- 4 May 2017

All 43 seats to Dumfries and Galloway Council 22 seats needed for a majority
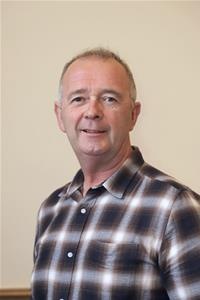

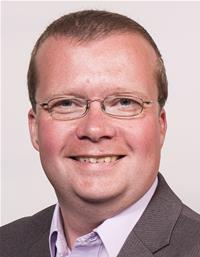

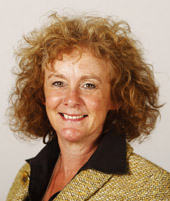

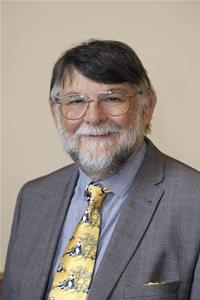
	First party	Second party	Third party
Leader	Ian Carruthers	Rob Davidson	Elaine Murray
Party	Conservative	SNP	Labour
Leader's seat	Annandale South	Abbey	Ran in Nith (elected)
Last election	14 seats, 26.6%	10 seats, 19.5%	15 seats, 29.3%
Seats before	13	11	12
Seats won	16	11	11
Seat change	▲2	▲1	▼4
Popular vote	21,138	11,779	10,077
Percentage	38.7%	21.6%	18.5%
Swing	▲12.1%	▲2.1%	▼10.9%
	Fourth party	Fifth party
	Ind
Leader	Jane Maitland	Richard Brodie
Party	Independent	Liberal Democrats
Leader's seat	Dee and Glenkens	Annandale South
Last election	7 seats, 18.1%	1 seat, 4.0%
Seats before	5	1
Seats won	4	1
Seat change	▼3	Steady
Popular vote	9,425	1,350
Percentage	17.3%	2.5%
Swing	▼0.8%	▼1.5%
- The 12 multi-member wards
Council Leader before election
Ronnie Nicholson
Labour
Council Leader after election
Elaine Murray
Labour

The 2017 Dumfries and Galloway Council election took place on 4 May 2017 to elect members of Dumfries and Galloway Council. The election used the twelve wards created as a result of the Local Governance (Scotland) Act 2004, with each ward electing three or four councillors using the single transferable vote system form of proportional representation, with 43 councillors being elected, a reduction of 4 members and 1 ward since 2012.

Following the election the Conservative Party became the largest party, with Labour falling from first place into third place in terms of votes and seats. The SNP also drew with Labour in terms of seats as they both won 11 seats.

This election also saw Independent councillors Willie Scobie and Jane Maitland returned, but saw Marion McCutcheon, George Prentice, Tom McAughtrie, Yen Hongmei Jin, Denis Male and Craig Peacock all losing their seats. Elaine Murray, the former Labour MSP for Dumfriesshire was elected to the Council in the Nith ward.

Following the election, Ian Carruthers (Annandale South) was elected as the Conservative group leader, Rob Davidson (Abbey) as the SNP group leader and Elaine Murray (Nith) as the Labour group leader. Richard Brodie (Annandale South), is the sole Liberal Democrat councillor.

On 23 May, almost three weeks following the election, Labour and the SNP formed a coalition to form a majority council with Murray as council leader and Rob Davidson as depute leader and civic head. Although the Conservatives were elected the largest party with 16 seats, they remained in opposition.

== Results ==
2017 Dumfries and Galloway Council election result
Party	Seats	Gains	Losses	Net gain/loss	Seats %	Votes %	Votes	+/−
Conservative	16	2	0	▲2	37.2	38.7	21,138	▲12.1
SNP	11	1	0	▲1	25.6	21.6	11,779	▲2.1
Labour	11	0	4	▼4	25.6	18.5	10,077	▼10.9
Independent	4	0	3	▼3	9.3	17.3	9,425	▼0.8
Liberal Democrats	1	0	0	Steady	2.3	2.5	1,350	▼1.5
Green	0	0	0	Steady	0.0	1.9	1,026	▲0.1
Scottish Libertarian	0	0	0	Steady	0.0	0.2	118	New

Note: "Votes" are the first preference votes. The net gain/loss and percentage changes relate to the result of the previous Scottish local elections on 3 May 2012. This may differ from other published sources showing gain/loss relative to seats held at dissolution of Scotland's councils.

== Ward results ==
=== Stranraer and the Rhins ===
- 2012: 1x Ind, 1x SNP, 1xLab
- 2017: 1x No description, 1x Con, 1x SNP, 1x Lab
- 2012-2017 Change: Conservative gain extra seat

Stranraer and the Rhins - 4 seats
Party	Candidate	FPv%	Count						
Party	Candidate	FPv%	1	2	3	4	5	6	7
No description	Willie Scobie (incumbent)	36.53	1,925						
Conservative	Andrew Giusti	32.31	1,703						
SNP	Ros Surtees	14.52	765	869.4	884.62	903.35	919.09	953.34	1,013.39
Labour	Tommy Sloan	5.92	312	589.94	661.86	694.11	723.69	774.28	912.14
Independent	Tracy Davidson	3.43	181	251.95	317.4	338.72	381.51		
Independent	Marion McCutcheon (incumbent)	3.15	166	259.55	332.23	363.55	418.26	533.25	
Independent	Robert McCrae	2.33	123	164.13	231.48	242.73			
Scottish Libertarian	Chris Collings	1.80	95	134.77	174.72				
Electorate: 11,382 Valid: 5,270 Spoilt: 80 Quota: 1,055 Turnout: 46.3%

=== Mid Galloway and Wigtown West ===
- 2017: 2x Con, 1x SNP, 1x Ind
- 2012-2017 Change: New ward

Mid Galloway and Wigtown West- 4 seats
Party	Candidate	FPv%	Count								
Party	Candidate	FPv%	1	2	3	4	5	6	7	8	9
Conservative	David Inglis	26.07	1,403								
Independent	Jim McColm (incumbent)	18.13	976	1,012.01	1,027.25	1,050.25	1,158.41				
Conservative	Graham Nicol (incumbent) †††††	13.43	723	960.46	962.93	971.02	1,009.64	1,032.12	1,234.63		
SNP	Katie Hagmann	13.02	701	703.32	708.32	733.32	806.49	811.66	860.02	867.82	1,416.84
SNP	Steve Norris	10.63	572	574.32	577.56	587.56	606.25	612.84	657.4	664.87	
Independent	Richard Oxley	8.83	475	48.01	496.24	506.24	551.94	579.43			
Labour	Matthew Curry	6.84	368	375.67	379.9	407.36					
Green	Barbara Bannatyne	2.16	116	118.32	121.79						
Independent	John McCutcheon	0.89	48	49.86							
Electorate: 9,594 Valid: 5,382 Spoilt: 120 Quota: 1,076 Turnout: 57.3%

=== Dee and Glenkens ===
- 2017: 1x Con, 1x SNP, 1x Ind
- 2012-2017 Change: New ward

Dee and Glenkens- 3 seats
Party	Candidate	FPv%	Count							
Party	Candidate	FPv%	1	2	3	4	5	6	7	8
Conservative	Patsy Gilroy (incumbent)†	33.47	1,547							
SNP	Dougie Campbell	19.56	904	909.31	916.81	921.32	934.82	967.08	1,121.83	1,250.09
Independent	Douglas Swan	15.84	732	788.11	804.12	817.64	844.2	886.49	925.55	
Independent	Jane Maitland (incumbent)	14.37	664	824.49	833.27	850.57	937.7	983.26	1,096.79	1,522.66
Green	Laura Moodie	6.32	292	303.88	305.88	321.67	333.43	402.21		
Labour	Elizabeth Maxwell	4.69	217	237.72	238.98	258.26	262.28			
Independent	Andi Holmes	2.60	120	144.52	157.28	174.57				
Liberal Democrats	Andrew Metcalf	1.84	85	106.74	111.99					
No description	John Thorn	1.32	61	70.6						
Electorate: 8,239 Valid: 4,622 Spoilt: 34 Quota: 1,156 Turnout: 56.5%

=== Castle Douglas and Crocketford ===
- 2017: 1x Con, 1x SNP, 1x Ind
- 2012-2017 Change: New ward

Castle Douglas and Crocketford - 3 seats
Party	Candidate	FPv%	Count					
Party	Candidate	FPv%	1	2	3	4	5	6
Conservative	David James†††	35.79	1,346					
Independent	Iain Howie	23.96	901	1,033.99				
SNP	John Young	20.10	756	761.72	772.23	837.81	928.28	1,099.88
Independent	George Nicol Prentice (incumbent)	9.70	365	451.66	496.45	522.15	628.9	
Labour	Lucy McKie	7.02	264	307.03	316.87	354.5		
Green	Paul Taylorson	3.43	129	147.66	155.77			
Electorate: 7,433 Valid: 3,761 Spoilt: 41 Quota: 941 Turnout: 50.6%

=== Abbey ===
- 2012: 2x Lab, 1x Con, 1x SNP
- 2017: 1x Con, 1x Lab, 1x SNP
- 2012-2017 Change: 1 less seat compared to 2012. Labour lose 1 seat.

Abbey - 3 seats
Party	Candidate	FPv%	Count						
Party	Candidate	FPv%	1	2	3	4	5	6	7
Conservative	Ian Blake (incumbent)	39.38	1,664						
Labour	Davie Stitt (incumbent)	21.92	926	1,084.31					
SNP	Rob Davidson (incumbent)	16.21	685	698.13	703.77	738.18	932.12	988.26	1,159.28
No description	Tom McAughtrie (incumbent)	10.60	448	517.31	521.99	532.31	540.35	645.66	
SNP	Kim Lowe	4.90	207	209.92	211.17	235.76			
Independent	Belle Doyle	4.14	175	268.75	271.41	314.93	324.82		
Green	Clare Phillips	2.84	120	151.74	155.6				
Electorate: 8,284 Valid: 4,225 Spoilt: 59 Quota: 1,057 Turnout: 51.0%

=== North West Dumfries ===
- 2012: 2x Lab, 1x Con, 1x SNP
- 2017: 2x Lab, 1x Con, 1x SNP
- 2012-2017 Change: No Change

North West Dumfries - 4 seats
Party	Candidate	FPv%	Count				
Party	Candidate	FPv%	1	2	3	4	5
Conservative	John Graham Bell (incumbent)	32.54	1,374				
SNP	Andy Ferguson (incumbent)	16.41	693	708.02	736.4	774.41	1,314.26
Labour	Ronnie Nicholson (incumbent)††	16.08	679	722.51	732.59	763.44	778.6
Labour	David John McKie (incumbent)	14.47	611	694.93	720.86	784.57	809.27
SNP	Stacy Bradley	13.60	574	588.25	613.02	642.33	
Independent	Billy Farries	3.86	163	268.88	304.73		
Green	Michelle Johnston	3.03	128	156.49			
Electorate: 9,981 Valid: 4,222 Spoilt: 112 Quota: 845 Turnout: 42.3%

=== Mid and Upper Nithsdale ===
- 2012: 2x Lab, 1x Con, 1x SNP
- 2017: 1x Con, 1x Lab, 1x SNP
- 2012-2017 Change: 1 less seat compared to 2012. Labour lose 1 seat.

Mid and Upper Nithsdale - 3 seats
Party	Candidate	FPv%	Count				
Party	Candidate	FPv%	1	2	3	4	5
Conservative	Matthew Ronnie	27.98	1,211				
Labour	Jim Dempster (incumbent)	24.38	1,055	1,087.55			
SNP	Andrew Stuart Wood (incumbent)††††	20.15	872	876.65	876.96	1,043.9	1,286.21
Labour	John Syme (incumbent)	16.73	724	730.76	734.26	839.41	
No description	Graham Watson	10.77	466	497.92	498.1		
Electorate: 8,105 Valid: 4,328 Spoilt: 50 Quota: 1,083 Turnout: 53.4%

=== Lochar ===
- 2012: 2x Lab, 1x Con, 1x SNP
- 2017: 1x Lab, 2x Con, 1x SNP
- 2012-2017 Change: Con gain from Lab

Lochar - 4 seats
Party	Candidate	FPv%	Count								
Party	Candidate	FPv%	1	2	3	4	5	6	7	8	9
Conservative	John Anthony Charteris	24.19	1,208								
Conservative	Ivor Alexander Hyslop (incumbent)	16.88	843	1,000.61							
Labour	Jeff Leaver (incumbent)	13.72	685	688.29	688.5	701.68	833.24	875.96	899.3	916.78	1,153.64
SNP	Tracey Little	13.20	659	661.08	661.09	685.1	689.1	710.45	1,099.98		
Independent	Yen Hongmei Jin (incumbent)	12.13	606	620.71	620.97	637.15	652.15	777.22	786.22	810.59	
SNP	Joe McGurk	8.33	416	417.21	417.23	440.58	447.58	459.75			
Independent	Maureen Johnstone	5.99	299	310.94	311.21	322.73	326.73				
Labour	Keith Walters	3.16	158	158.69	158.74	175.92					
Green	Arthur Ramsay	2.40	120	121.38	121.43						
Electorate: 10,603 Valid: 4,994 Spoilt: 118 Quota: 999 Turnout: 47.1%

=== Nith ===
- 2012: 2x Lab, 1x SNP, 1x Con
- 2017: 2x Lab, 1x SNP, 1x Con
- 2012-2017 Change: No Change

Nith - 4 seats
Party	Candidate	FPv%	Count									
Party	Candidate	FPv%	1	2	3	4	5	6	7	8	9	10
Conservative	Malcolm Johnstone	29.30	1,481									
Labour	Elaine Murray	19.01	961	1,033.2								
SNP	John Campbell	16.97	858	862.75	863.32	887.71	901.77	922.72	950.35	1,379.72		
SNP	Alastair Witts (incumbent)	8.66	438	441.48	441.96	468.7	488.37	493.71	507.68			
Labour	John Martin (incumbent)	8.39	424	463.9	478.72	500.8	523.66	540.98	579.72	599.29	682.97	837.94
Independent	David Robert Slater	5.88	297	362.55	363.43	380.02	401.18	459.13	586.3	606.99	676.46	
Independent	Niall Cowan	3.88	196	246.35	247.12	252.05	278.76	321.56				
Independent	Andrew Crosbie	3.03	153	188.15	188.47	192.81	210.46					
Independent	John Dennis	2.49	126	151.02	151.67	168.34						
Green	Sandy Rogerson	2.39	121	133.67	134.22							
Electorate: 10,233 Valid: 5,055 Spoilt: 77 Quota: 1,012 Turnout: 49.4%

=== Annandale South ===
- 2012: 2x Lab, 1x Lib Dem, 1x Con
- 2017: 1x Con, 1x Lib Dem, 1x SNP, 1x Lab
- 2012-2017 Change: SNP gain from Lab

Annandale South - 4 seats
Party	Candidate	FPv%	Count						
Party	Candidate	FPv%	1	2	3	4	5	6	7
Conservative	Ian Brian Carruthers (incumbent)	31.48	1,621						
Liberal Democrats	Richard John Brodie (incumbent)	19.58	1,008	1,183.73					
SNP	Henry McClelland	17.81	917	933.41	950.54	950.67	972.18	999.06	1,152.05
Labour	Sean Marshall (incumbent)	13.61	701	768.08	811.3	819.7	1,190.65		
Independent	Allan Weild	8.74	450	550.99	585.58	599.68	634.99	674.21	
Labour	Ronnie Ogilvie (incumbent)	8.33	429	451.6	467.73	470.63			
Scottish Libertarian	Peter McKain	0.45	23	31.02	34.55				
Electorate: 10,955 Valid: 5,149 Spoilt: 72 Quota: 1,030 Turnout: 47.0%

=== Annandale North ===
- 2012 Notional: 2x Con, 1x Lab, 1x SNP
- 2017: 2x Con, 1x Lab, 1x SNP
- 2012-2017 Change: No Change

Annandale North - 4 seats
Party	Candidate	FPv%	Count			
Party	Candidate	FPv%	1	2	3	4
Conservative	Douglas Fairbairn (incumbent)	28.76	1,573			
Conservative	Gail McGregor (incumbent)	25.72	1,407			
SNP	Stephen Thompson (incumbent)	23.91	1,308			
Labour	Adam Wilson	16.91	925	998.84	1,055.83	1,126.99
Liberal Democrats	Lisa Courts	4.70	257	356.37	438.41	500.94
Electorate: 11,540 Valid: 5,470 Spoilt: 69 Quota: 1,095 Turnout: 47.4%

=== Annandale East and Eskdale ===
- 2012: 2x Con, 1x Lab, 1X Ind
- 2017: 2x Con, 1x Lab
- 2012-2017 Change: 1 less seat compared to 2012. 1 Independent loss.

Annandale East and Eskdale - 3 seats
Party	Candidate	FPv%	Count				
Party	Candidate	FPv%	1	2	3	4	5
Conservative	Karen Carruthers (incumbent)	29.59	1,290				
Conservative	Ronnie Tait	17.06	744	881.45	901.22	983.92	1,266.4
No description	Denis Raymond Male (incumbent)	16.54	721	732.42	809.57	934.96	
Labour	Archie Dryburgh (incumbent)	14.63	638	652.04	776.35	1,029.74	1,362.05
Independent	Craig Peacock (incumbent)	11.77	513	529.2	630.51		
SNP	Sylvia Moffat	10.41	454	455.85			
Electorate: 8,466 Valid: 4,360 Spoilt: 65 Quota: 1,091 Turnout: 51.5%

== Aftermath ==
On 26 February 2019, Labour Cllr Ronnie Nicholson resigned from the party and became an Independent.

On 12 April 2019, Castle Douglas and Crocketford Conservative Cllr David James resigned from the party and became an Independent claiming the party avoided making policies.

On 5 July 2019, Mid and Upper Nithsdale SNP Cllr Andrew Wood resigned from the party and became an Independent. On 21 September 2020, Cllr. Wood announced that he had joined the Conservative party.

=== By-elections ===
==== Dee and Glenkens by-election ====
On 18 October 2018, Dee and Glenkens Conservative councillor Patsy Gilroy resigned her seat. She was appointed as Lord Lieutenant of the Stewartry by Her Majesty The Queen on 5 November 2018. A by-election was held on 13 December 2018. The seat was won by Pauline Drysdale of the Conservative party.

Dee and Glenkens By-election (13 December 2018)
Party	Candidate	FPv%	Count			
Party	Candidate	FPv%	1	2	3	4
Conservative	Pauline Louise Drysdale	45.9	1,682	1,704	1,740	1,956
SNP	Glen Murray	28.0	1,024	1,026	1,183	1,357
Independent	Colin Matthew Wyper	15.5	569	575	651	
Green	Laura Elizabeth Moodie	9.3	342	349		
UKIP	Jennifer Blue	1.3	42			
Electorate: 8,088 Valid: 3,663 Spoilt: 29 Quota: 1,832.00 Turnout: 3,692 (45.65%)

==== Mid Galloway and Wigtown West by-election ====
On 25 October 2019, Mid Galloway and Wigtown West Conservative Cllr Graham Nicol died suddenly. A by-election was held on the 23 January 2020. The seat was won by Jackie McCamon of the Conservative party.

Mid Galloway and Wigtown West By-election (23 January 2020)
Party	Candidate	FPv%	Count
Party	Candidate	FPv%	1
Conservative	Jackie McCamon	61.8	2,177
SNP	Tony Berretti	25.5	898
Green	Peter Barlow	6.4	225
Labour	Gill Hay	6.3	220
Turnout: 3,520 (32.5%)
