= 2007 Dumfries and Galloway Council election =

2007 Scottish local government election

← 2003	3 May 2007	2012 →

All 47 seats to Dumfries and Galloway Council 24 seats needed for a majority
	First party	Second party	Third party
Party	Conservative	Labour	SNP
Last election	11 seats	14 seats	5 seats
Seats won	18	14	10
Seat change	▲7	Steady	▲5
Popular vote	20,815	18,169	12,266
Percentage	32.2%	28.1%	19.0%
	Fourth party	Fifth party
Party	Liberal Democrats	Independent
Last election	5 seats	12 seats
Seats won	3	2
Seat change	▼2	▼10
Popular vote	5,340	7,240
Percentage	8.3%	11.2%

Elections to Dumfries and Galloway Council were held on 3 May 2007 the same day as the other Scottish local government elections and the Scottish Parliament general election. The election was the first one using 13 new wards created as a result of the Local Governance (Scotland) Act 2004, each ward will elect three or four councillors using the single transferable vote system form of proportional representation. The new wards replace 47 single-member wards which used the plurality (first past the post) system of election.

The Conservatives increased their number of seats by seven to 18, the SNP increased by five to 10. 27 of the people elected had not been councillors previously.

Following the elections a Conservative-Lib Dem minority administration was formed.

== Results ==
2007 Dumfries and Galloway Council election result
Party	Seats	Gains	Losses	Net gain/loss	Seats %	Votes %	Votes	+/−
Conservative	18	-	-	▲7	38.3	32.2	20,815	
Labour	14	-	-	Steady	29.8	28.1	18,169	
SNP	10	-	-	▲5	21.3	19.0	12,266	
Liberal Democrats	3	-	-	▼2	6.4	8.3	5,340	
Independent	2	-	-	▼10	4.3	11.2	7,240	
Green	0	-	-	Steady	0.0	1.0	619	
UKIP	0	-	-	Steady	0.0	0.3	175	

== Ward results ==
=== Stranraer and North Rhins (3 seats) ===
Stranraer and North Rhins
Party	Candidate	FPv%	Count				
Party	Candidate	FPv%	1	2	3	4	5
Labour	Willie Scobie	25.8	1,006				
Conservative	John Dougan	23.9	932	933.46	1,018.91		
SNP	Iain William Dick	18.0	702	703.46	805.61	812.48	1,114.69
Independent	Ian McIntyre	17.2	668	669.27	752.93	773.26	
Labour	Tommy Sloan	15.0	584	606.93			
Electorate: 7,350 Valid: 3,892 Spoilt: 84 Quota: 974 Turnout: 54.1%

=== Wigtown West (3 seats) ===
Wigtown West
Party	Candidate	FPv%	Count			
Party	Candidate	FPv%	1	2	3	4
SNP	Robert James Higgins	33.0	1,291			
Labour	Grahame Forster	31.4	1,230			
Conservative	Roberta Tuckfield	22.1	866	904.06	942.47	1,019.30
Independent	Ted Adamson	8.3	327	395.17	449.64	559.16
Green	Bob Bauld	5.2	203	270.21	310.05	
Electorate: 6,914 Valid: 3,917 Spoilt: 47 Quota: 974 Turnout: 57.3%

=== Mid Galloway (3 seats) ===
Mid Galloway
Party	Candidate	FPv%	Count			
Party	Candidate	FPv%	1	2	3	4
SNP	Alistair Geddes	38.7	1,654			
Conservative	Graham Nicol	32.5	1,387			
Liberal Democrats	Sandra McDowall	15.2	650	867.51	1,008.06	1,460.25
Labour	Maggie Birch	13.6	581	713.63	749.85	
Electorate: 7,558 Valid: 4,272 Spoilt: 49 Quota: 1,069 Turnout: 57.2%

=== Dee (3 seats) ===
Dee
Party	Candidate	FPv%	Count					
Party	Candidate	FPv%	1	2	3	4	5	6
Conservative	Patsy Gilroy	21.0	994	1,027	1,054	1,059.04	1,143.39	1,736.70
Independent	Jane Maitland	20.9	989	1,062	1,200			
SNP	Thomas Jacques	19.5	924	970	1,043	1,045.25	1,122.86	1,188.13
Conservative	Chris Walker	14.8	701	713	766	767.85	906.59	
Independent	Ian McConchie	8.8	418	437	490	494.56		
Liberal Democrats	Joan Mitchell	8.1	384	437				
Labour	John Sydney Burt	6.7	319					
Electorate: 7,463 Valid: 4,729 Spoilt: 68 Quota: 1,183 Turnout: 64.3%

=== Castle Douglas and Glenkens (3 seats) ===
Castle Douglas and Glenkens
Party	Candidate	FPv%	Count					
Party	Candidate	FPv%	1	2	3	4	5	6
Conservative	Peter Duncan	32.3	1,560					
SNP	Brian Collins	23.9	1,152	1,165.84	1,251.30			
Independent	George Nicol Prentice	18.7	904	940.99	1,006.35	1,016.27	1,180.89	1,536.89
Liberal Democrats	Alison Mary Barratt	9.8	471	487.57	606.47	620.16	719.30	
Labour	Mike McLurg	9.4	451	456.22				
Conservative	Alex Zimmerman	5.9	285	527.80	543.62	546.82		
Electorate: 7,983 Valid: 4,823 Spoilt: 84 Quota: 1,206 Turnout: 61.5%

=== Abbey (4 seats) ===
Abbey
Party	Candidate	FPv%	Count								
Party	Candidate	FPv%	1	2	3	4	5	6	7	8	9
Conservative	Ian Blake	19.7	1,081	1,091	1,126						
SNP	Rob Davidson	17.8	976	996	1,010	1,010.90	1,056.97	1,097.97	1,153.02		
Conservative	Bruce Hodgson	14.2	778	825	834	851.27	883.96	924.15	990.59	995.94	1,052.65
Labour	Tom McAughtrie	14.1	777	794	797	797.39	812.44	856.44	874.46	881.32	
Labour	Davie Stitt	14.0	770	777	806	807.08	843.22	881.22	943.36	953.57	1,479.11
Liberal Democrats	Josephine Robertson	4.9	267	280	290	290.37	316.42				
Independent	John White	4.3	239	266	304	304.90	372.27	418.34			
Independent	Stuart Martin Clement	3.8	211	226	269	270.85					
Independent	Ian Stewart McMickan	3.7	203	211							
Independent	Michael John Thomson	3.5	194								
Electorate: 9,347 Valid: 5,496 Spoilt: 85 Quota: 1,100 Turnout: 59.7%

=== North West Dumfries (4 seats) ===
North West Dumfries
Party	Candidate	FPv%	Count						
Party	Candidate	FPv%	1	2	3	4	5	6	7
Labour	Ronnie Nicholson	25.6	1,327						
Conservative	John Graham Bell	20.4	1,060						
Labour	David John McKie	19.2	996	1,132.95					
SNP	Doug Snell	15.6	809	819.85	824.49	827.34	864.91	950.22	1,179.06
Labour	Stephen David Harman	12.5	650	722.49	789.41	790.64	823.31	868.90	
Liberal Democrats	Joe Sweeney	3.6	188	192.12	194.25	197.99	240.41		
Independent	Arthur Tremble	3.1	163	169.73	173.46	177.52			
Electorate: 9,794 Valid: 5,193 Spoilt: 124 Quota: 1,039 Turnout: 54.3%

=== Mid and Upper Nithsdale (4 seats) ===
Mid and Upper Nithsdale
Party	Candidate	FPv%	Count							
Party	Candidate	FPv%	1	2	3	4	5	6	7	8
Labour	Jim Dempster	22.0	1,261							
Conservative	Gill Dykes	19.2	1,102	1,106.10	1,117.38	1,138.47	1,195.83			
Labour	John Syme	15.3	876	942.11	961.57	989.39	1,010.03	1,011.46	1,074.06	1,136.04
SNP	Andrew Stuart Wood	13.7	783	790.02	816.39	842.57	899.21	901.90	996.69	1,117.31
Conservative	Neil McKay	13.1	753	757.74	766.02	794.56	836.65	870.23	985.48	
Liberal Democrats	Rog Wood	6.6	378	386.66	397.03	414.48	474.85	477.80		
Independent	Mike Steele	4.5	256	258.46	294.01	317.28				
UKIP	Douglas Watters	3.1	175	178.01	181.19					
Independent	Moses Kungu	2.5	145	149.19						
Electorate: 9,354 Valid: 5,729 Spoilt: 102 Quota: 1,146 Turnout: 62.3%

=== Lochar (4 seats) ===
Lochar
Party	Candidate	FPv%	Count						
Party	Candidate	FPv%	1	2	3	4	5	6	7
Labour	Jeff Leaver	19.3	978	983	1,010	1,522			
Conservative	John Anthony Charteris	17.2	872	882	916	923	949.14	951.08	1,092.25
SNP	Lorna Jean McGowan	16.5	836	843	901	930	1,029.85		
Conservative	Ivor Alexander Hyslop	15.6	791	799	832	840	860.44	861.94	1,001.14
Labour	Alec Martin	11.8	597	603	636				
Independent	David Slater	10.9	550	593	672	686.	764.07	768.89	
Liberal Democrats	John Robertson	6.3	317	340					
Independent	Graham William Sutherland McLeod	2.3	118						
Electorate: 8,900 Valid: 5,059 Spoilt: 73 Quota: 1,012 Turnout: 57.7%

=== Nith (4 seats) ===
Nith
Party	Candidate	FPv%	Count						
Party	Candidate	FPv%	1	2	3	4	5	6	7
Labour	John Allan Martin	23.0	1,268						
SNP	Alistair Witts	20.8	1,145						
Conservative	Jack Groom	14.4	794	795.56	798.13	843.68	1,304.35		
Labour	Colin Smyth	13.0	714	847.76	854.92	912.09	940.39	954.98	1,262.99
Conservative	Frances Hassall	11.3	623	624.69	626.60	662.00			
Liberal Democrats	Kerr Little	10.9	598	605.55	614.02	740.42	794.05	857.23	
Independent	Robin Wishart	6.7	368	370.34	378.30				
Electorate: 10,021 Valid: 5,510 Spoilt: 79 Quota: 1,103 Turnout: 55.8%

=== Annandale South (4 seats) ===
Annandale South
Party	Candidate	FPv%	Count						
Party	Candidate	FPv%	1	2	3	4	5	6	7
Labour	Sean William Marshall	23.1	1,324						
Liberal Democrats	Richard John Brodie	16.9	970	1,001.63	1,139.01	1,183.28			
Conservative	Ian Brian Carruthers	16.4	936	939.92	983.60	1,406.95			
Labour	Ronnie Ogilvie	14.1	807	903.93	1,001.72	1,016.26	1,040.12	1,049.86	1,315.73
SNP	John McNaught	11.6	665	674.33	743.73	766.00	804.06	812.86	
Conservative	Sharon Jane Ledger	9.2	527	530.24	582.65				
Independent	John Ramage	8.6	494	504.14					
Electorate: 10,833 Valid: 5,723 Spoilt: 122 Quota: 1,145 Turnout: 53.9%

=== Annandale North (4 seats) ===
Annandale North
Party	Candidate	FPv%	Count						
Party	Candidate	FPv%	1	2	3	4	5	6	7
Conservative	Roger Brian Grant	18.5	1,011	1,019	1,146				
Labour	Ted Brown	15.0	818	843	848	848.95	889.04	1,002.09	1,095.45
Conservative	Gail MacGregor	13.7	751	754	834	866.58	907.39	959.48	1,089.89
Liberal Democrats	Michael Dickie	13.7	749	786	805	808.86	862.00	1,043.31	1,328.72
SNP	Johanne Lydia Wood	13.0	710	733	739	739.82	775.95		
Independent	Billy Lockhart	10.0	547	559	578	583.85	796.26	934.26	
Independent	Jean Hamilton Purves	8.2	446	461	467	470.72			
Conservative	Neil MacInnes	5.1	277	278					
Green	Alis Ballance	2.9	159						
Electorate: 9,951 Valid: 5,468 Spoilt: 84 Quota: 1,094 Turnout: 55.8%

=== Annandale East (4 seats) ===
Annandale East
Party	Candidate	FPv%	Count						
Party	Candidate	FPv%	1	2	3	4	5	6	7
Conservative	Denis Raymond Male	20.6	992						
Conservative	Ian Lindsay	20.4	981						
Labour	Archie Dryburgh	17.3	835	835.88	836.63	879.83	997.11		
Conservative	Allan Graham	15.8	761	777.19	788.38	816.71	873.51	877.49	1,069.86
SNP	Murray Collins	12.9	619	622.39	623.64	667.93	776.26	784.66	
Liberal Democrats	Peter James Burn	7.6	368	369.46	370.49	448.63			
Green	Nicholas John Jennings	5.3	257	258.55	259.15				
Electorate: 9,629 Valid: 4,813 Spoilt: 66 Quota: 963 Turnout: 50.7%

== By-Elections since 3 May 2007 ==
- On 1 May 2008, a by-election was held to fill the seat vacated by Bruce Hodgson who had resigned. Michael John Thomson retained the seat for the Conservative Party.

Abbey by-election May 1, 2008 - 1 Seat
Party	Candidate	FPv%	Count			
Party	Candidate	FPv%	1	2	3	4
Conservative	Michael John Thomson	40.08	1,713	1,749	1,804	2,006
Labour	Tom McAughtrie	33.18	1,393	1,418	1,471	1,712
SNP	John Richard McNaught	17.98	755	785	833	
Independent	Graham William Sutherland McLeod	4.12	173	216		
Liberal Democrats	Keith Joseph Mycock	3.91	164			
Conservative hold		Swing				
Electorate: 9,381 Valid: 4,224 Spoilt: 26 Quota: 2,100 Turnout: 4,250

- On 16 June 2011, a by-election was held to fill the seat vacated by Michael John Thomson who had resigned. Tom McAughtrie won the seat for the Labour Party.

Abbey by-election June 16, 2011 - 1 Seat
Party	Candidate	FPv%	Count	
Party	Candidate	FPv%	1	2
Conservative	Kath Lord	39.46	1,236	1,391
Labour	Tom McAughtrie	38.19	1,196	1,448
SNP	Yowann Byghan	21.65	678	
Labour gain from Conservative		Swing		
Electorate: 9,249 Valid: 3,132 Spoilt: 22 Quota: 1,566 Turnout: 3,154
