= Dumfries and Galloway =

Council area of Scotland

Dumfries and Galloway: Dùn Phris is Gall-Ghàidhealaibh (Scottish Gaelic); Dumfries an Gallowa (Scots)
- Council area
- Coat of arms

- Dumfries and Galloway shown within Scotland
- Coordinates: 55.1°N 3.9°W
- Sovereign state: United Kingdom
- Country: Scotland
- Lieutenancy areas: Dumfries; Stewartry of Kirkcudbright; Wigtown
- Unitary authority: 1 April 1996
- Administrative HQ: County Buildings, Dumfries

Government
  - Type: Council
  - Body: Dumfries and Galloway Council
  - Control: No overall control

Area
  - Total: 2,481 sq mi (6,426 km^{2})
  - Rank: 3rd

Population (2025)
  - Total: 145,490
  - Rank: 14th
  - Density: 60/sq mi (23/km^{2})
- Time zone: UTC+0 (GMT)
  - Summer (DST): UTC+1 (BST)
- ISO 3166 code: GB-DGY
- GSS code: S12000006
- Website: www.dumfriesandgalloway.gov.uk

Dumfries and Galloway (Scots: Dumfries an Gallowa; Scottish Gaelic: Dùn Phris is Gall-Ghàidhealaibh) is one of the 32 unitary council areas of Scotland, situated in the western part of the Southern Uplands. It is bordered by East Ayrshire, South Ayrshire, and South Lanarkshire to the north; the Scottish Borders to the northeast; and the English county of Cumbria, the Solway Firth, and the Irish Sea to the south. To the west, it faces the North Channel.

The administrative centre and largest settlement is the town of Dumfries. The second-largest town, Stranraer, lies approximately 76 miles (122 km) west of Dumfries on the North Channel coast.

Dumfries and Galloway corresponds to the historic shire counties of Dumfriesshire, Kirkcudbrightshire, and Wigtownshire, the latter two collectively known as Galloway. These three counties were merged in 1975 to form the Dumfries and Galloway Region, which consisted of four districts. The district system was abolished in 1996, when the area became a single unitary authority under the same name.

For lieutenancy purposes, Dumfries and Galloway is divided into three ceremonial areas: Dumfries, Wigtown, and the Stewartry of Kirkcudbright, each corresponding broadly to the former historic counties.

== History ==
The term Dumfries and Galloway has been used since at least the 19th century – by 1911 the three counties had a united sheriffdom under that name. Dumfries and Galloway covers the majority of the western area of the Southern Uplands, it also hosts Scotland's most Southerly point, at the Mull of Galloway in the west of the region.

Dumfries itself has a rich history going back over 800 years as a Royal Burgh (1186). It is particularly remembered as the place where Robert the Bruce murdered the Red Comyn in 1306 before being crowned King of Scotland – and where Robert Burns spent his last years. His mausoleum is in St Michael's graveyard. Going down the east bank of the Nith is the village of Glencaple, Caerlaverock Castle, an ancient Roman fort on Ward Law Hill and nearby in Ruthwell is the Ruthwell Cross and the Brow Well where Robert Burns "took the waters" and bathed in the Solway just before his death.

Sweetheart Abbey lies within New Abbey and the National Museum of Costume lies just outside the village.

Near Kirkbean, the house of John Paul Jones, founder of the American Navy, is open to visitors.

== Geography ==
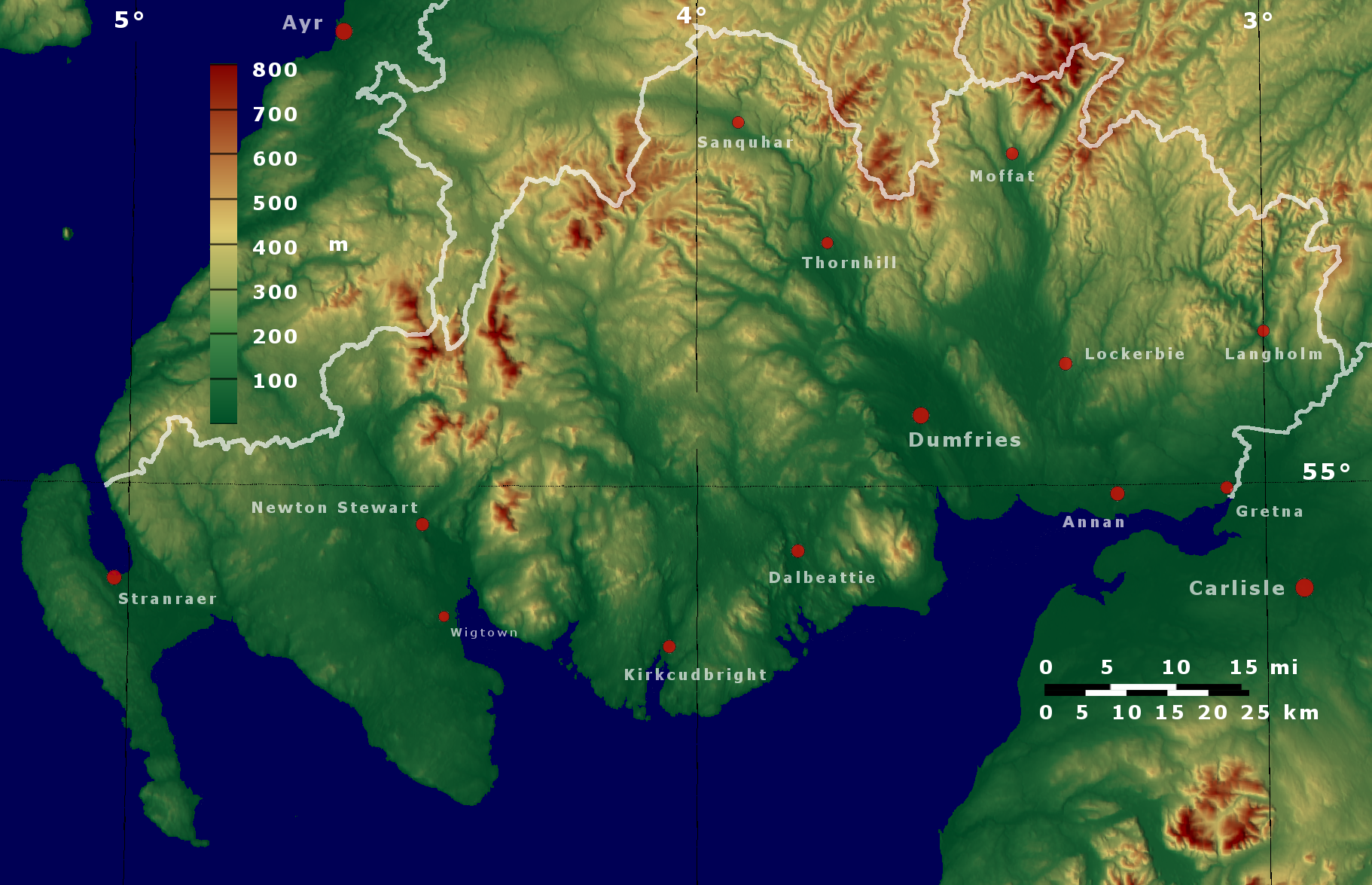
Topographic map of Dumfries and Galloway

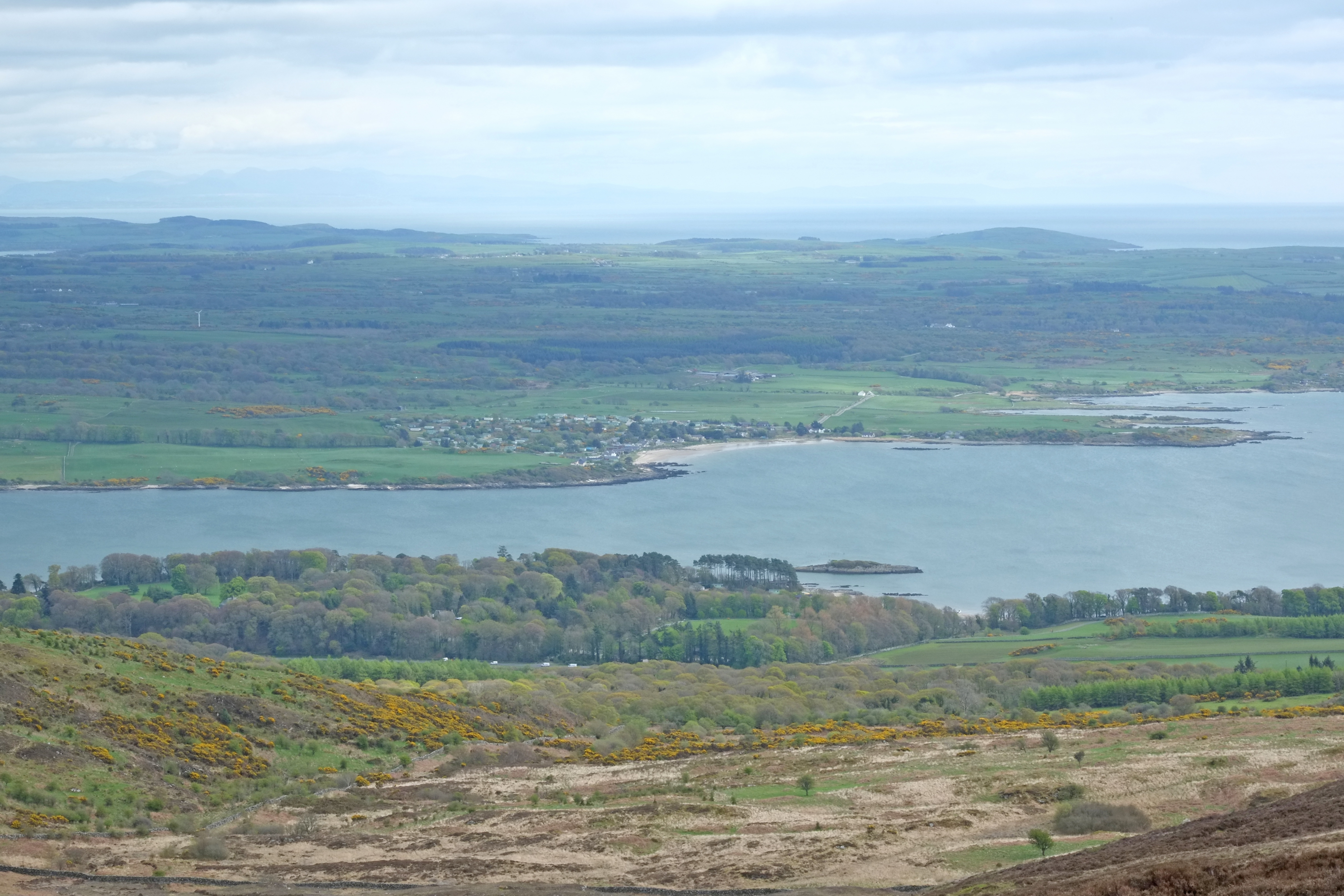
Airds Bay, Dumfries and Galloway

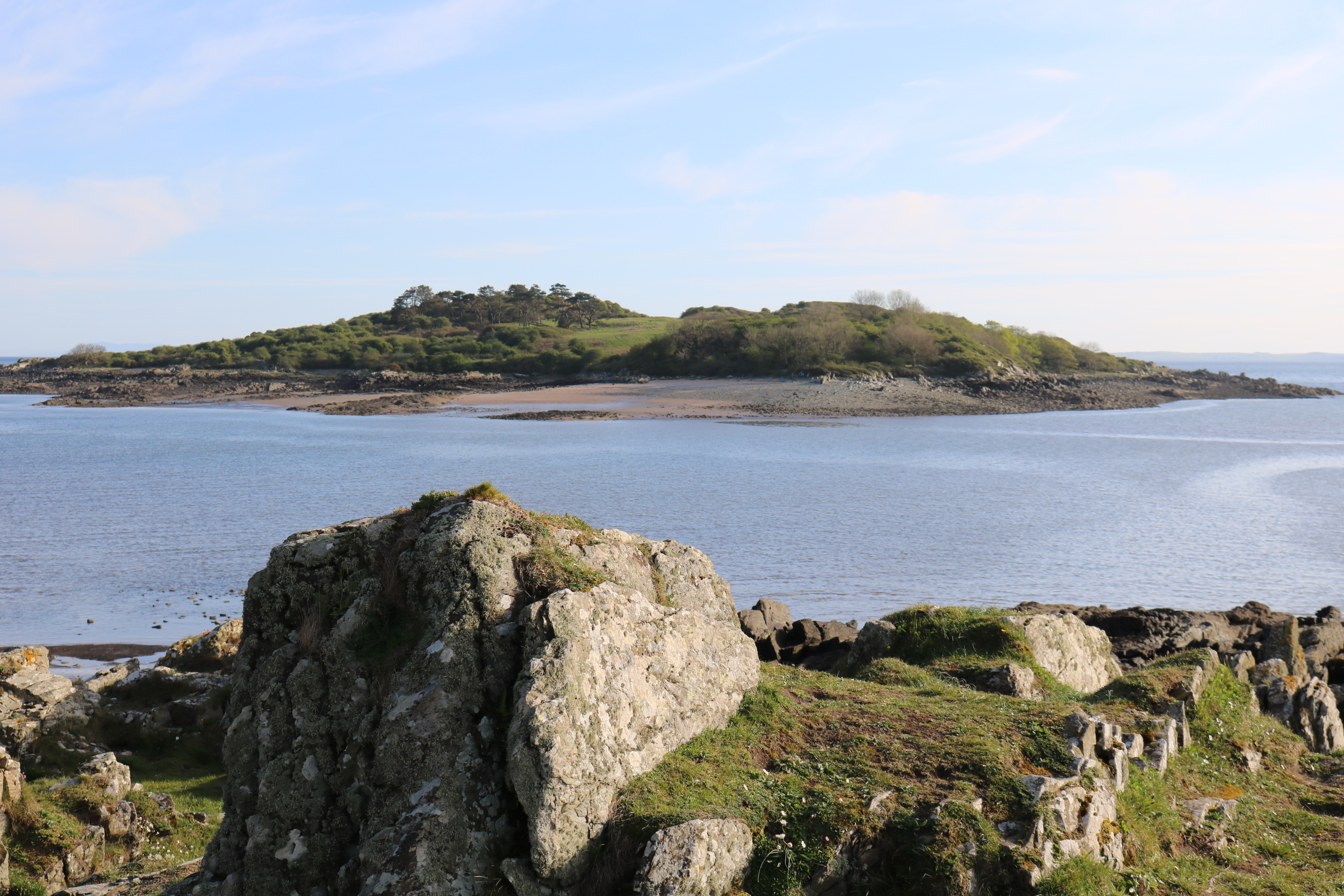
Ardwall Isle, a costal island rock off the Dumfries and Galloway shoreline

=== Regions ===
The Dumfries and Galloway Council region is composed of counties and their sub-areas. From east to west:

- Dumfriesshire County
  - the sub-area of Dumfriesshire – Annandale
  - the sub-area of Dumfriesshire – Eskdale
  - the sub-area of Dumfriesshire – Nithsdale
- Kirkcudbrightshire County
  - the sub-area of Kirkcudbrightshire – Stewartry (archaically, Desnes)
- Wigtownshire County
  - the sub-area of Wigtownshire – Machars (archaically, Farines)--divided into census areas (civil parish areas)
  - the sub-area of Wigtownshire – Rhins of Galloway divided into census areas (civil parish areas)

=== Water systems ===
The region has a number of south running water systems which break through the Southern Uplands creating the main road, and rail, arteries north–south through the region and breaking the hills up into a number of ranges.

- River Cree valley carries the A714 north-westward from Newton Stewart to Girvan and Water of Minnoch valley which lies just west of the Galloway Hills carries a minor road northward through Glentrool village into South Ayrshire. This road leaves the A714 at Bargrennan.
- Water of Ken and River Dee form a corridor through the hills called the Glenkens which carries the A713 road from Castle Douglas to Ayr. The Galloway Hills lie to the west of this route through the hills and the Carsphairn and Scaur Hills lie to the east.
- River Nith rises between Dalmellington and New Cumnock in Ayrshire and runs east then south down Nithsdale to Dumfries. Nithsdale carries both the A76 road and the rail line from Dumfries to Kilmarnock. It separates the Carsphairn and Scaur Hills from the Lowther Hills which lie east of the Nith.
- River Annan combines with Evan Water and the River Clyde to form one of the principal routes into central Scotland from England – through Annandale and Clydesdale – carrying the M74 and the west coast railway line. This gap through the hills separates the Lowthers from the Moffat Hills.
- River Esk enters the Solway Firth just south of Gretna having travelled south from Langholm and Eskdalemuir. The A7 travels up Eskdale as far as Langholm and from Langholm carries on up the valley of Ewes Water to Teviothead where it starts to follow the River Teviot to Hawick. Eskdale itself heads north west from Langholm through Bentpath and Eskdalemuir to Ettrick and Selkirk.

=== Transport ===
The A701 branches off the M74 at Beattock, goes through the town of Moffat, climbs to Annanhead above the Devil's Beef Tub (at the source of the River Annan) before passing the source of the River Tweed and carrying on to Edinburgh. Until fairly recent times the ancient route to Edinburgh travelled right up Annandale to the Beef Tub before climbing steeply to Annanhead. The present road ascends northward on a ridge parallel to Annandale but to the west of it which makes for a much easier ascent.

From Moffat the A708 heads north east along the valley of Moffat Water (Moffatdale) on its way to Selkirk. Moffatdale separates the Moffat hills (to the north) from the Ettrick hills to the south.

== Natural Heritage ==
=== Landscape ===
There are three National Scenic Areas within the region:

- Nith Estuary: this area follows the River Nith southward from just south of Dumfries into the Solway Firth. On the west bank, there are several walks and cycle routes in Mabie Forest, Kirkconnell Flow, an extensive area of peatland between Dumfries and New Abbey, is a National nature reserve. Criffel (569 metres) offers the hill walker a reasonably modest walk with views across the Solway to the Lake District.
- East Stewartry Coast: this takes in the coast line from Balcary Point eastward across Auchencairn Bay and the Rough Firth past Sandyhills to Mersehead. There are several coastal villages within this area – Auchencairn, Kippford, Colvend, Rockcliffe, and Portling. There is also a round tower at Orchardton and the islands of Hestan Isle and Rough Island can be reached at low tide outside the breeding season for birds. Mersehead is a wildfowl reserve. The area has a number of coastal paths.
- Fleet Valley: this area takes in Fleet Bay with its holiday destinations of Auchenlarie, Mossyard Bay, Cardoness, Sandgreen and Carrick Shore. The area also includes the town of Gatehouse of Fleet and the historic villages of Anworth and Girthon – there is a castle at Cardoness in the care of Historic Scotland.

=== Fauna ===
The coastline of Dumfries and Galloway is an internationally important migratory and local bird habitat. There are RSPB Nature Reserves at the Mull of Galloway, Wood of Cree (Galloway Forest Park), Ken Dee Marshes (near Loch Ken) and Mereshead (near Dalbeattie on the Solway Firth). The wetland nature reserve at Caerlaverock is managed by the Wildfowl & Wetlands Trust.

The region is a stronghold for several rare and protected species of amphibian, such as the Natterjack toad and the Great crested newt.

=== Flora ===
The Cree Valley in the Galloway Hills north of Newton Stewart holds some of the most extensive areas of ancient woodland in southern Scotland. Clones from aspen (Populus Tremula) growing in inaccessible locations on the Galloway coast have contributed disproportionately to the national aspen clone bank. Some of the purest genetic strains of the wild apple (Malus sylvestris) are to be found in the region's coastal woodlands.

== Transport ==
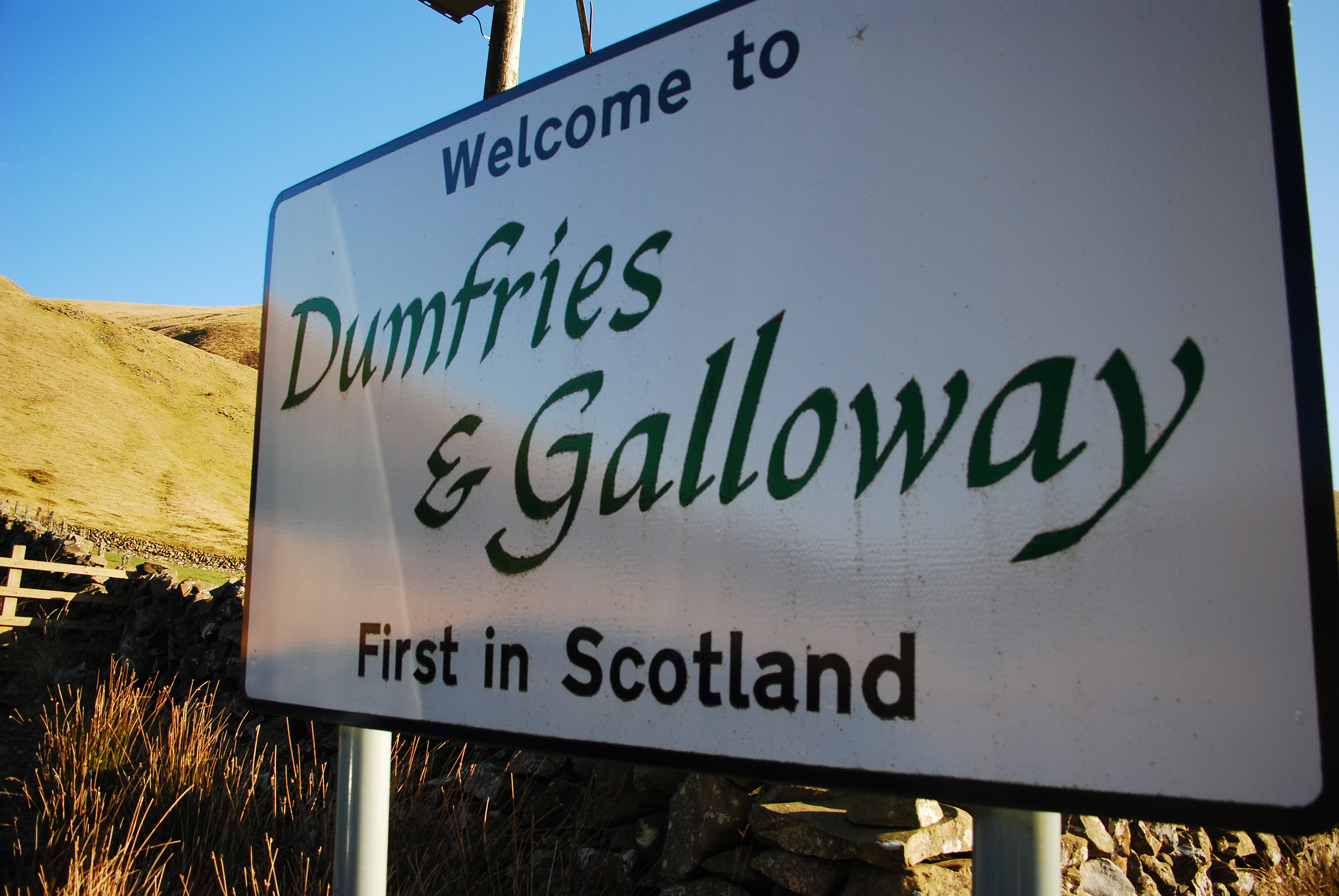
Welcome sign

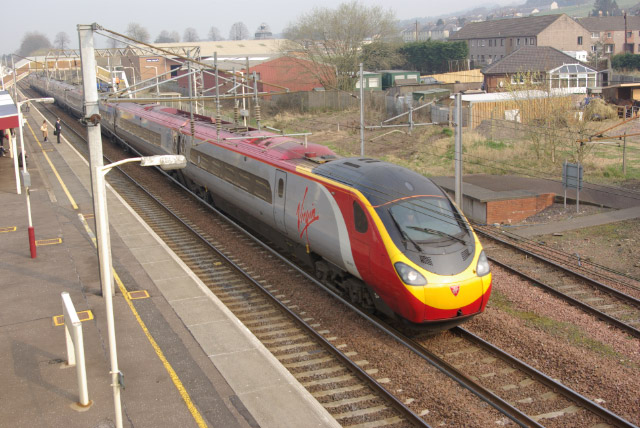
A Virgin Pendolino leaving Lockerbie station for Carlisle

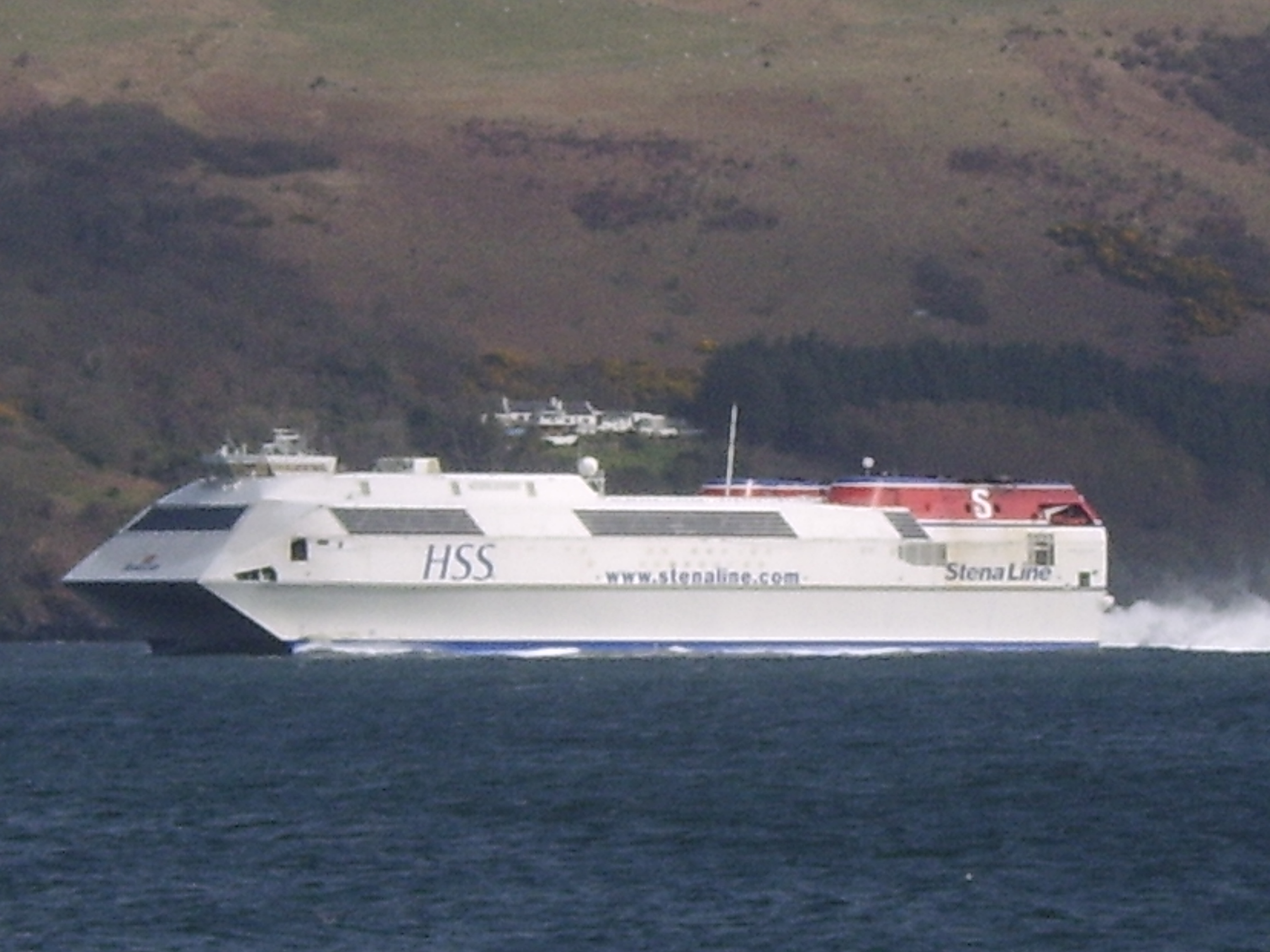
Stena Line provided HSS sailings between Stranraer and Belfast

Transport in the region is operated by bus companies Houston's, Stagecoach South Scotland, Stagecoach Cumbria and North Lancashire, McCall's Coaches, the council-run DGC Buses and a variety of other small operators. Train operators in the region are ScotRail, TransPennine Express and Avanti West Coast. The region has seven working railway stations. All are on the Glasgow South Western Line, except Lockerbie which is on the West Coast Main Line.

- Stranraer railway station
- Kirkconnel railway station
- Sanquhar railway station
- Dumfries railway station
- Annan railway station
- Gretna Green railway station
- Lockerbie railway station

The mainline from Dumfries railway station via Newton Stewart to Stranraer Harbour railway station, was closed under the Beeching cuts. The line previously connected London Euston and the West Coast Main Line with the ferries to Larne Harbour railway station and the Port of Belfast.

The Port Road line to Stranraer was the last to go in June 1965, leaving only the original G&SWR main line open to serve the Stranraer. The Beeching cuts ended the Castle Douglas and Dumfries Railway and Portpatrick and Wigtownshire Railway has resulted in adverse mileage to connect Stranraer with a longer line via Kilmarnock and Ayr.

The area is served by buses which connect the main population centres. Express bus services link the main towns with Glasgow, Ayr, Edinburgh and Carlisle. Local bus services also operate across the region. Dumfries and Galloway is home to two ports which have services to Northern Ireland, both are in the West of the region. Stena Line and P&O Irish Sea both have a port in the village of Cairnryan. The region also has no commercial airports; the nearest are Glasgow Prestwick Airport and Carlisle Lake District Airport. The region does host a number of private airfields.

The main roads to and from the region are:

- A74(M)
- A75
- A76
- A77
- A701
- A709

== Emergency services ==
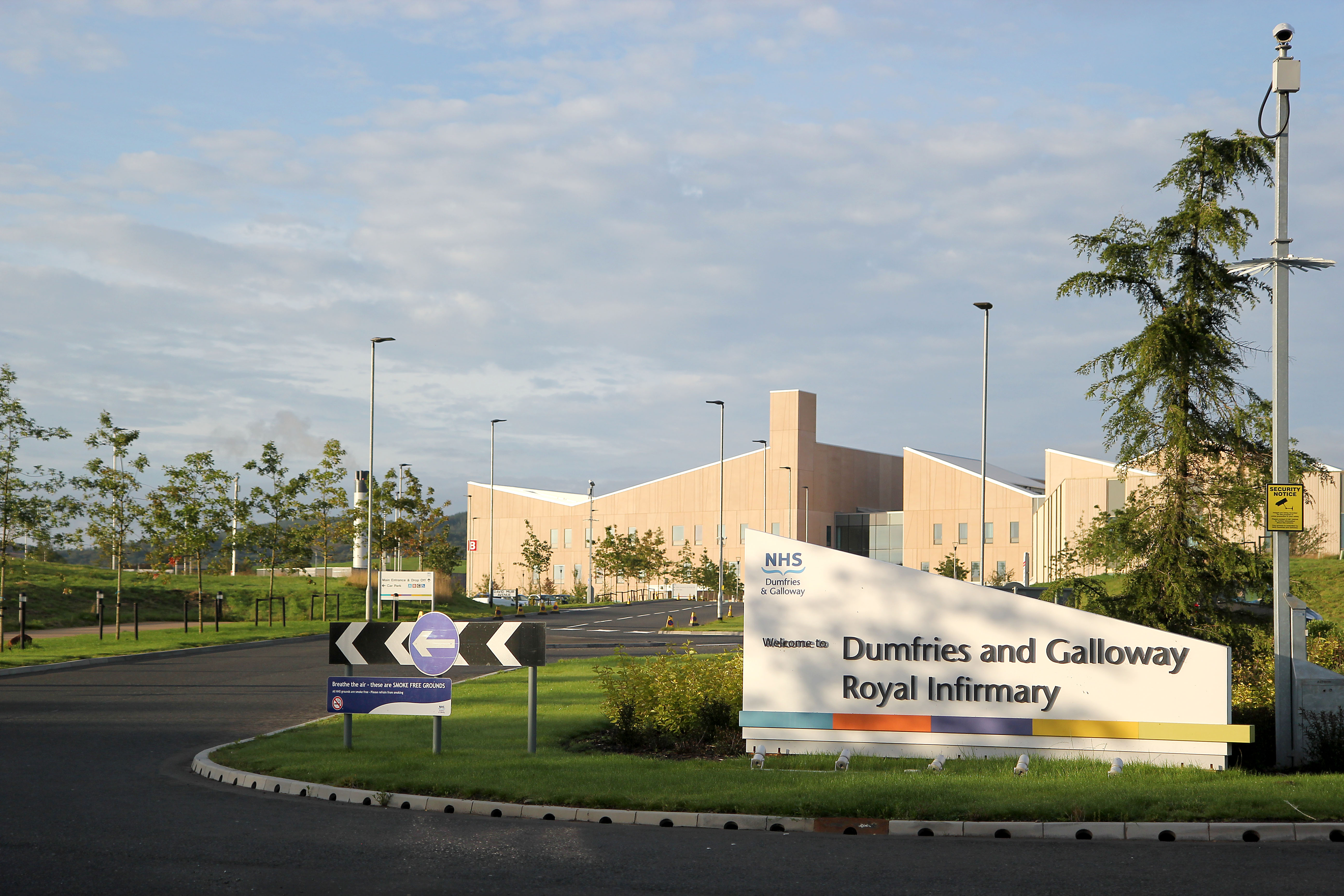
Dumfries and Galloway Royal Infirmary

As with the whole of Scotland, Police Scotland is the police force for the region and Scotland as a whole since it was formed from the merger of Scotland's previous regional police forces. Its predecessor, Dumfries and Galloway Constabulary (dissolved 2014) was the smallest police force in the United Kingdom. The Scottish Fire and Rescue Service (formerly Dumfries and Galloway Fire and Rescue Service) provides firefighting services across the region. The Coastguard, Lifeboats, Moffat mountain rescue and Galloway Mountain Rescue also offer emergency services across Dumfries and Galloway.

Nith Inshore Rescue is based at Glencaple. This independent lifeboat provides water rescue cover for the River Nith, surrounding rivers and inland water. Nith Inshore Rescue is a declared facility for HM Coastguard, the control centre and overseeing authority responsible for call outs.

NHS Dumfries and Galloway provides healthcare services across the region. The two main hospitals are the Dumfries and Galloway Royal Infirmary in Dumfries and Galloway Community Hospital in Stranraer.

== Education ==
Dumfries & Galloway Council provides nursery, primary and secondary education across the region.

=== Alternative schools ===
- Kilquhanity School

=== Secondary schools ===
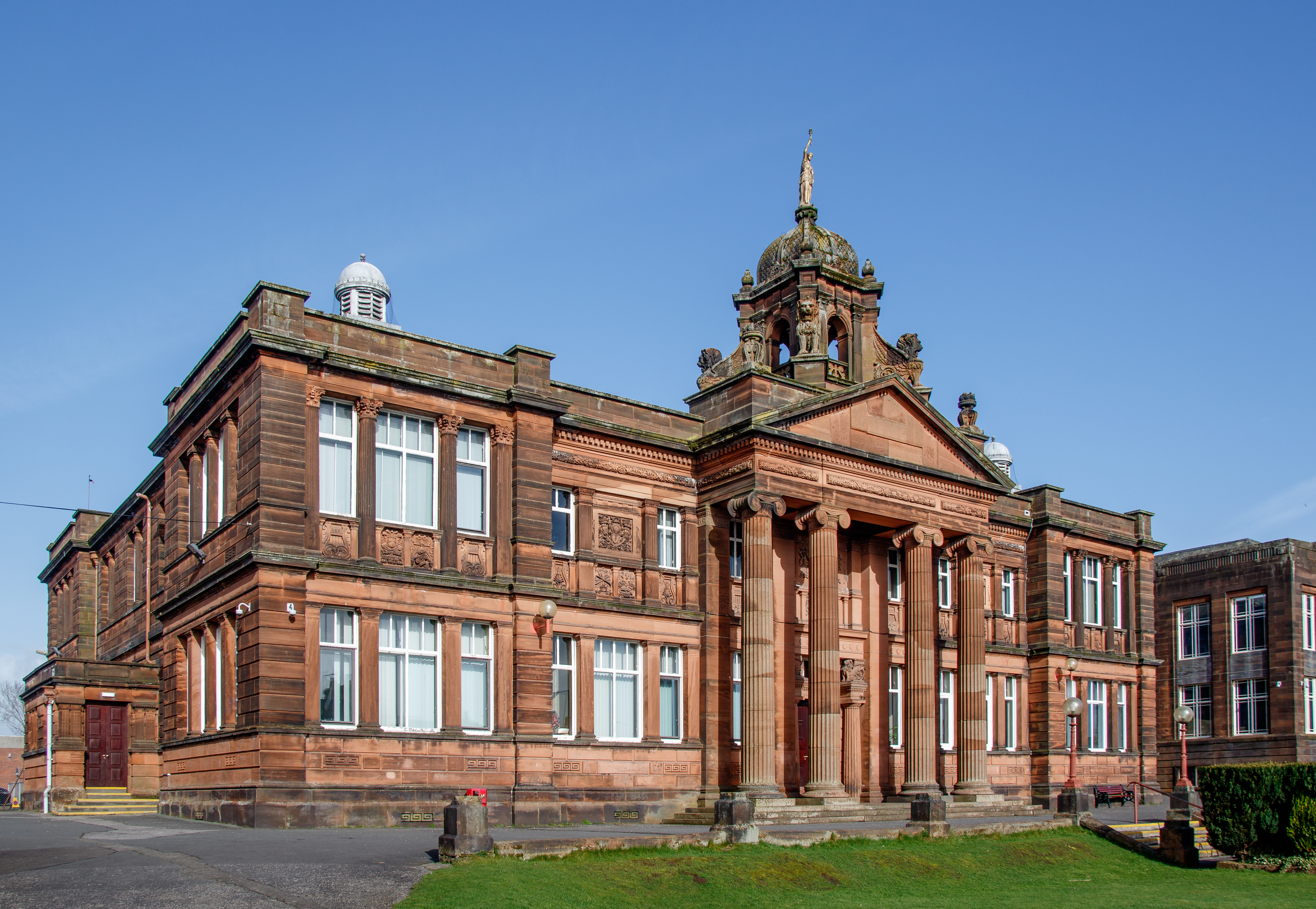
The Minerva building of Dumfries Academy

- Annan Academy
- Castle Douglas High School
- Dalbeattie High School
- Douglas Ewart High School, Newton Stewart
- Dalry Secondary School
- Dumfries Academy
- Dumfries High School
- Kirkcudbright Academy
- Langholm Academy
- Lockerbie Academy
- Moffat Academy
- North West Community Campus, Dumfries
- Sanquhar Academy
- St Joseph's College, Dumfries
- Stranraer Academy
- Wallace Hall, Thornhill

== Culture ==
=== Languages ===
The 2022 Scottish Census reported that out of 142,514 residents aged three and over, 48,703 (34.2%) considered themselves able to speak or read the Scots language.

The 2022 Scottish Census reported that out of 142,501 residents aged three and over, 1,162 (0.8%) considered themselves able to speak or read Gaelic.

=== Outdoor activities ===
There are five 7Stanes mountain biking centres in Dumfries and Galloway at Dalbeattie, Mabie, Ae, Glentrool and Kirroughtree. The Sustrans Route 7 long distance cycle route also runs through the region. There is excellent hill walking in the Moffat Hills, Lowther Hills the Carsphairn and Scaur Hills and Galloway Hills. The Southern Upland Way coast to coast walk passes through Dumfries and Galloway and the 53-mile long Annandale Way travels from the Solway Firth into the Moffat hills near the Devil's Beef Tub. There is also fresh water sailing on Castle Loch at Lochmaben and at various places on Loch Ken Loch Ken also offers waterskiing and wakeboarding. The Solway Firth coastline offers fishing, caravaning and camping, walking and sailing.

=== Arts and media ===
Dumfries and Galloway is well known for its arts and cultural activities as well as its natural environment. The major festivals include the region-wide Dumfries & Galloway Arts Festival, and Spring Fling Open Studios. Other festivals include Big Burns Supper in Dumfries and the Wigtown Book Festival in Wigtown – Scotland's national book town.

In terms of television, the area is cover by BBC Scotland broadcasting from Glasgow and ITV Border which broadcast from Gateshead. Radio stations are provided by BBC Radio Scotland which broadcast the local opt-out from its studios in Dumfries and the commercial radio station, Greatest Hits Radio Dumfries & Galloway also broadcast local news bulletins to the area.

The area is served by these local newspapers:

- Dumfries & Galloway Standard
- Annandale Herald
- Annandale Observer
- Dumfries Courier
- Eskdale and Liddesdale Advertiser
- Galloway Gazette
- Galloway News
- Moffat News
- Stranraer and Wigtownshire Free Press

== Settlements ==
The largest settlements in Dumfries and Galloway.

Largest settlements by population:

Settlement	Population (2020)
Dumfries	33,470
Stranraer	10,110
Annan	8,760
Locharbriggs	5,610
Lockerbie	4,190
Dalbeattie	4,160
Newton Stewart	4,030
Castle Douglas	4,000
Kirkcudbright	3,350
Gretna	3,110

Main settlements in bold text.

- Ae, Airieland, Airds of Kells, **Annan**, Anwoth, Ardwell
- Beattock, Beeswing, Borgue, Brydekirk
- Caerlaverock, Cairngaan, Cairnryan, Cargenbridge, Carsphairn, **Castle Douglas**, Castle Kennedy, Clarencefield, Corsock, Creetown
- **Dalbeattie**, Dalton, Dornock, Drumlanrig, Drummore, **Dumfries**, Dundrennan, Dunscore
- Eastriggs, Ecclefechan, Eskdalemuir
- Garlieston, **Gatehouse of Fleet**, Glenluce, Gretna Green, **Gretna**
- Haugh of Urr, Hoddom
- **Isle of Whithorn**
- Johnsfield, Johnstonebridge
- Keir, Kelloholm, Kippford, Kirkbean, Kirkcolm, Kirkcowan **Kirkcudbright**, **Kirkconnel**, Kirkinner, Kirkpatrick Durham
- **Langholm**, Leswalt, **Locharbriggs**, **Lochmaben**, **Lockerbie**
- Middleshaw, Millhousebridge, Mochrum, **Moffat**, **Moniaive**, Muirhead, Mull of Galloway
- New Abbey, **New Galloway**, New Luce, **Newton Stewart**, Newton Wamphray
- Palnackie, Parkgate, Parton, Penpont, Portpatrick, Port William
- Ringford, Robgill Tower, Ruthwell
- Sandhead, **Sanquhar**, Sorbie, **St John's Town of Dalry**, Stoneykirk, **Stranraer**
- Templand, Terregles, **Thornhill**, Twynholm
- Unthank
- Wanlockhead, **Whithorn**, **Wigtown**

== Accidents and disasters ==
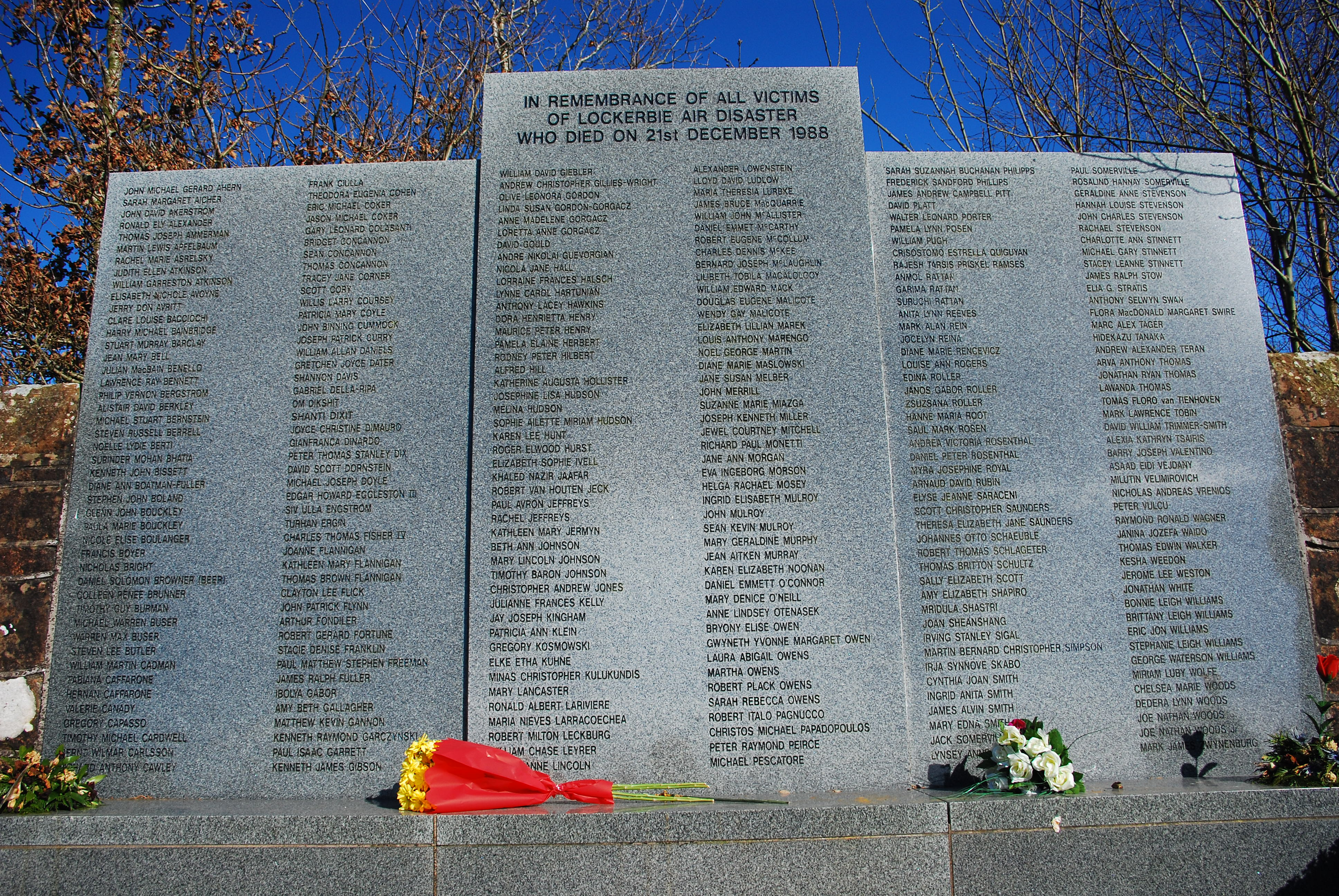
Lockerbie air disaster memorial at Dryfesdale Cemetery

In 1915, the Quintinshill rail disaster occurred close to Gretna. It resulted in the deaths of over 200 people and remains the worst rail disaster in British history.

In 1988, a terroist bombing caused Pan Am Flight 103 to crash near Lockerbie. The bombing is the deadliest terrorist attack in the history of the United Kingdom. 259 on board the plane and 11 people on the ground died.

== Places of interest ==
- Annandale distillery - Scotch Whisky
- Bladnoch distillery - Scotch Whisky
- Caerlaverock Castle – Historic Scotland
- Caerlaverock NNR (national nature reserve)
- WWT Caerlaverock – a reserve of the Wildfowl and Wetlands Trust
- Cardoness Castle
- Castle of St John, Stranraer
- Corsewall Lighthouse, privately owned
- Drumlanrig Castle
- HM Factory, Gretna, Eastriggs – site of a munitions factory during World War I
- Galloway Forest Park, Forestry and Land Scotland
- Galloway Hydro Electric Scheme, Scottish Power
- Glenlair – home of 19th century physicist James Clerk Maxwell
- Glenluce Abbey
- Hallhill Covenanter Martyrs Memorial - near Kirkpatrick Irongray Church.
- Isle of Whithorn Castle
- Kenmure Castle – a seat of the Clan Gordon
- Loch Ken
- MacLellan's Castle, Kirkcudbright
- Motte of Urr
- Mull of Galloway – RSPB/ South Rhins Community Development Trust
- Ruthwell Cross
- Samye Ling Tibetan Monastery
- Southern Upland Way – long distance footpath
- Sweetheart Abbey, New Abbey
- Threave Castle

== Governance ==
Dumfries and Galloway Council Comhairle Dhùn Phris is Ghall-Ghàidhealaibh

Type
- Type: Unitary authority

Leadership
- Convener: Tracey Little, SNP since 1 June 2026
- Leader: Stephen Thompson, SNP since 16 June 2025
- Chief Executive: Dawn Roberts since July 2022

Structure
- Seats: 43 councillors
- Graph of the party split among 43 seats.
- Political groups: Administration (11) SNP (11) Other parties (32) Conservative (10) Labour (8) Liberal Democrats (1) Independent (13)
- Length of term: 5 years

Elections
- Voting system: Single transferable vote
- Last election: 5 May 2022
- Next election: 6 May 2027

Meeting place
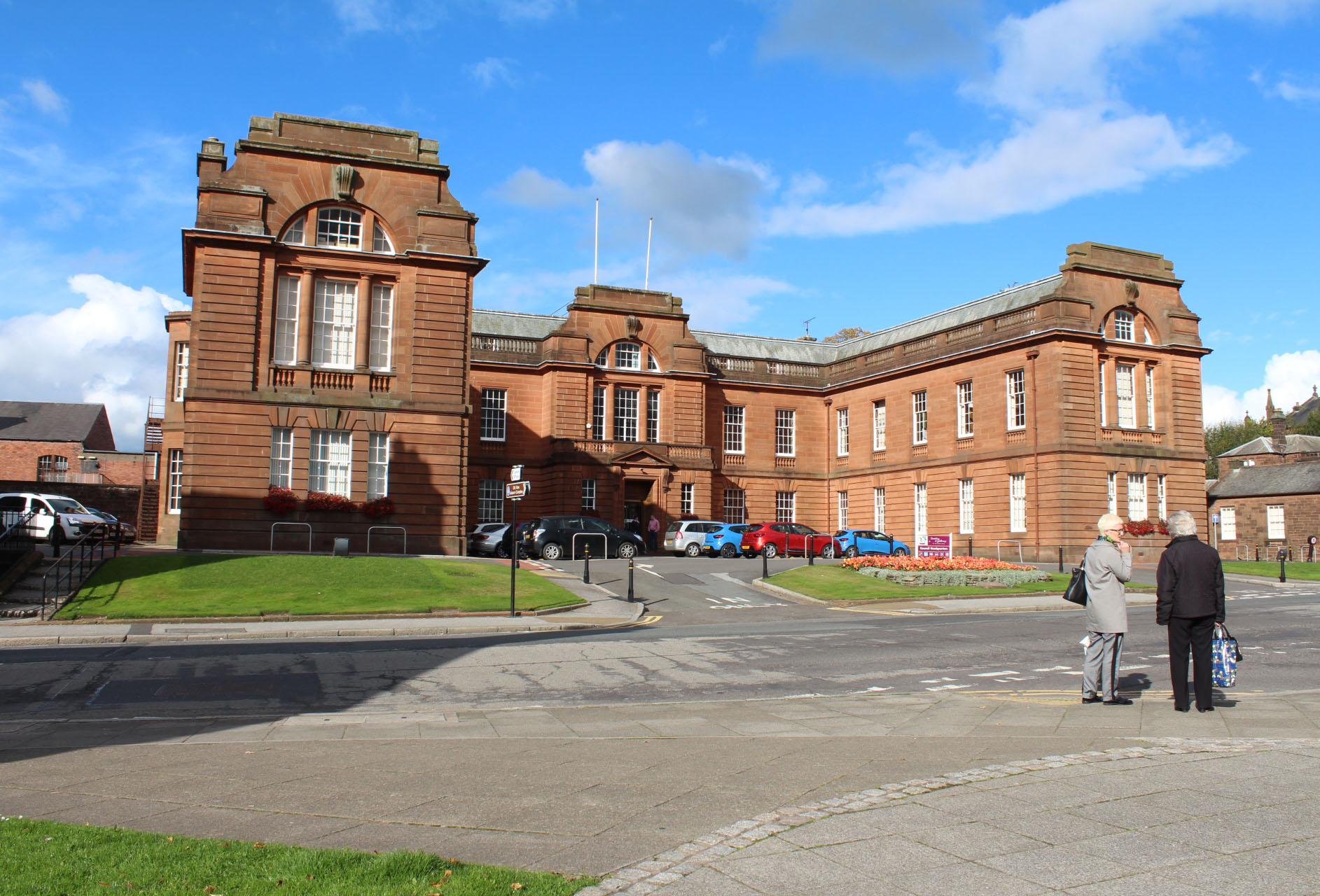
- Council Offices, 113 English Street, Dumfries, DG1 2DD

Website
- www.dumfriesandgalloway.gov.uk

=== Administrative history ===
Prior to 1975, the area that is now Dumfries and Galloway was administered as three separate counties: Dumfriesshire, Kirkcudbrightshire, and Wigtownshire. The counties of Scotland originated as sheriffdoms, which were established from the twelfth century, consisting of a group of parishes over which a sheriff had jurisdiction. An elected county council was established for each county in 1890 under the Local Government (Scotland) Act 1889.

The three county councils were abolished in 1975 under the Local Government (Scotland) Act 1973, which established a two-tier structure of local government across Scotland comprising upper-tier regions and lower-tier districts. A region called Dumfries and Galloway was created covering the area of the three counties, which were abolished as administrative areas. The region contained four districts:

- Annandale and Eskdale, covering the eastern part of Dumfriesshire.
- Nithsdale, covering the western part of Dumfriesshire and a small part of Kirkcudbrightshire.
- Stewartry, covering most of Kirkcudbrightshire.
- Wigtown, covering all of Wigtownshire and a small part of Kirkcudbrightshire. (Note: The district of Wigtown was named in the 1973 Act as "Merrick", but the name was changed to Wigtown prior to the new system coming into force in 1975.)

Further local government reform in 1996 under the Local Government etc. (Scotland) Act 1994 saw the area's four districts abolished, with the Dumfries and Galloway Council taking over the functions they had previously performed. The council continues to use the areas of the four abolished districts as committee areas. The four former districts are also used to define the area's three lieutenancy areas, with Nithsdale and Annandale and Eskdale together forming the Dumfries lieutenancy, the Stewartry district corresponding to the Stewartry of Kirkcudbright lieutenancy, and the Wigtown district corresponding to the Wigtown lieutenancy.

The council headquarters is at the Council Offices at 113 English Street in Dumfries, which had been built in 1914 as the headquarters for the old Dumfriesshire County Council, previously being called "County Buildings".

=== Political control ===
The council has been under no overall control since it took on its modern form in the reforms of 1996. In June 2025, the Scottish National Party took over the leadership of the council after several defections from the Conservatives left the SNP the largest party on the council.

The first election to the Dumfries and Galloway Regional Council was held in 1974, initially operating as a shadow authority alongside the outgoing authorities until the new system came into force on 16 May 1975. A shadow authority was again elected in 1995 ahead of the reforms which came into force on 1 April 1996. Political control of the council since 1975 has been as follows:

Regional council

Party in control	Years
Independent	1975–1994
No overall control	1994–1996

Unitary authority

Party in control	Years
No overall control	1996–present

=== Leadership ===
Since 2007 the council has been required to designate a leader of the council. The leader may also act as the convener, chairing council meetings, or the council may choose to appoint a different councillor to be convener. Prior to 2007 the council sometimes chose to appoint a leader, and sometimes did not. The leaders since 2007 have been:

Councillor	Party	From	To	Notes
Ivor Hyslop	Conservative	15 May 2007	1 Oct 2013	
Ronnie Nicholson	Labour	1 Oct 2013	23 May 2017	
Elaine Murray	Labour	23 May 2017	May 2022	
Stephen Thompson	SNP	24 May 2022	3 Feb 2023	Co-leaders, with Thompson being the civic head and convener and Dorward being the depute convener.
Linda Dorward	Labour	24 May 2022	3 Feb 2023	Co-leaders, with Thompson being the civic head and convener and Dorward being the depute convener.
Stephen Thompson	SNP	3 Feb 2023	28 Feb 2023	
Gail Macgregor	Conservative	7 Mar 2023	16 Jun 2025	
Stephen Thompson	SNP	16 Jun 2025		

=== Composition ===
Following the 2022 election and subsequent changes of allegiance up to October 2026, the composition of the council was:

Party	Seats
SNP	11
Conservative	10
Labour	8
Liberal Democrats	1
Independent	13
Total	43

Of the independent councillors, four form the "Novantae" group (named after the ancient Novantae people who lived in the area), three sit with the Liberal Democrat as the "Independent Group", three form the "Dumfries and Galloway Independent Group", two form the "Democratic Alliance", and the other is not aligned to any group. The next election is due in 2027.

=== Elections ===
Since 2007 elections have been held every five years under the single transferable vote system of election. This system was introduced by the Local Governance (Scotland) Act 2004 to achieve a reasonably proportionately representative outcome. Election results since 1995 have been as follows:

Year	Seats	Conservative	SNP	Labour	Liberal Democrats	Independent	Notes
1995	70	2	9	21	10	28	
1999	47	8	5	13	6	15	New ward boundaries.
2003	47	11	5	14	5	12	
2007	47	18	10	14	3	2	New ward boundaries. Conservative and SNP coalition.
2012	47	14	10	15	1	7	Conservative / SNP coalition until October 2013. Labour / SNP coalition until June 2014. Minority Labour administration 2014–2017.
2017	43	16	11	11	1	4	New ward boundaries. Labour and SNP coalition.
2022	43	16	11	9	1	6	SNP and Independent Group Coalition with Labour support until February 2023. Conservative minority administration from March 2023. SNP minority administration from June 2025.

=== Wards ===
The council area is divided into 12 wards that elect 43 councilors:

Ward Number	Ward Name	Location	Seats	Parties
1	Stranraer and the Rhins		4	2x Novantae, 1x SNP, 1x Democratic Alliance
2	Mid Galloway and Wigtown West		4	2x Novantae, 1x SNP, 1x Conservative
3	Dee and Glenkens		3	1x SNP, 1x Democratic Alliance, 1x Non-aligned
4	Castle Douglas and Crocketford		3	1x SNP, 1x Democratic Alliance, 1x Conservative
5	Abbey		3	1x SNP, 1x Labour, 1x Conservative
6	North West Dumfries		4	2x Labour, 1x SNP, 1x Conservative
7	Mid and Upper Nithsdale		3	1x Independent, 1x Independent Group 1x SNP
8	Lochar		4	2x Conservative, 1x SNP, 1x Labour
9	Nith		4	1x Labour, 1x SNP, 1x Labour, 1x Independent
10	Annandale South		4	1x Liberal Democrat, 1x Labour, 1x SNP, 1x Independent Group
11	Annandale North		4	2x Conservative, 1x SNP, 1x Labour
12	Annandale East and Eskdale		3	1x Labour, 1x Independent, 1x Independent Group

== Wider politics ==
=== Referendums ===
In the 2014 Scottish independence referendum, Dumfries and Galloway voted 'No' by the third highest percentage of 65.7% behind Orkney (67.2%) and Scottish Borders (66.6%), followed by Shetland (63.7%).

In the 2016 European Union membership referendum, Dumfries and Galloway voted 'Remain' by a 53.1% margin, second lowest 'Remain' after Moray (50.1%). Third in terms of lowest 'Remain' was Aberdeenshire (55.0%).

=== Parliamentary constituencies ===
Dumfries and Galloway is represented in the Scottish Parliament by two constituencies, Dumfriesshire and Galloway and West Dumfries. Under the additional-member electoral system used for elections to the Scottish Parliament, each constituency elects one Member of the Scottish Parliament (MSP) by the first past the post method of election, and an additional seven members are elected from across the South Scotland electoral region to produce a form of proportional representation for the region as a whole.

In the House of Commons of the United Kingdom, Dumfries and Galloway is represented by two seats: the Dumfries and Galloway seat covers most of the council area, with the remainder forming part of Dumfriesshire, Clydesdale and Tweeddale (which also covers parts of the South Lanarkshire and Scottish Borders council areas). Each seat elects a single member using the first past the post method.

== Gallery ==
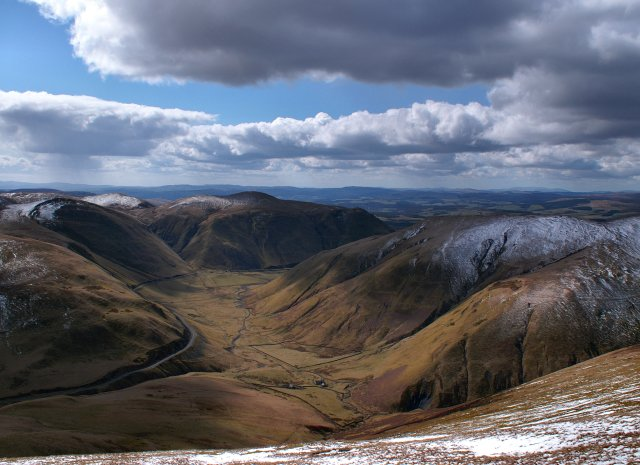
Dalveen Pass from Comb Head summit, near Thornhill, Dumfries and Galloway, Scotland.

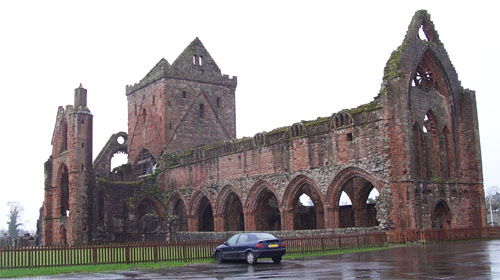
Sweetheart Abbey, Dumfries and Galloway (Scotland)

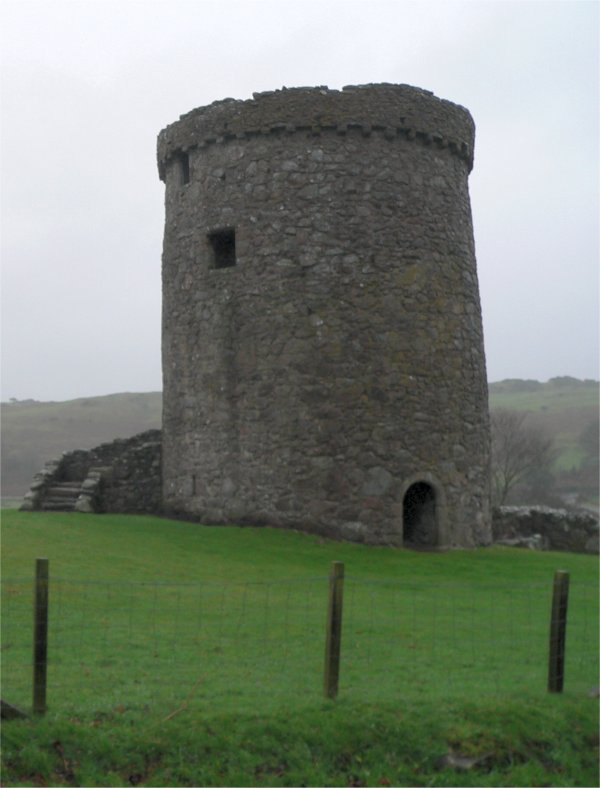
Orchardton Tower, Dumfries and Galloway, Scotland

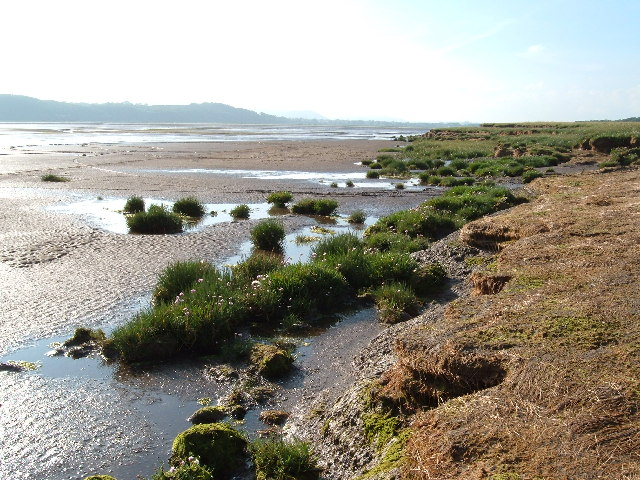
Caerlaverock National Nature Reserve. View across the Nith Estuary, close to the Solway Firth, Dumfries & Galloway.

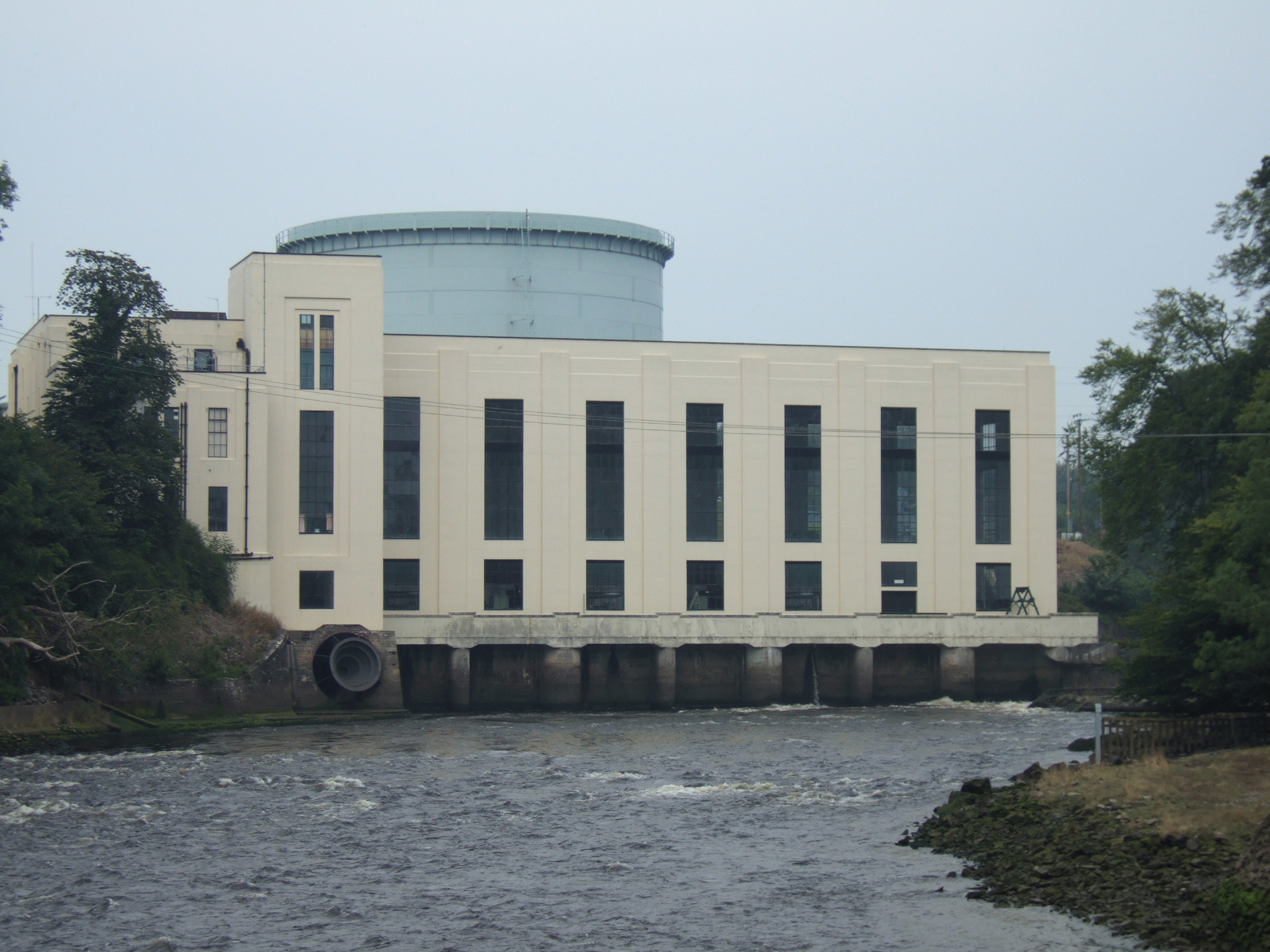
Tongland Power station.

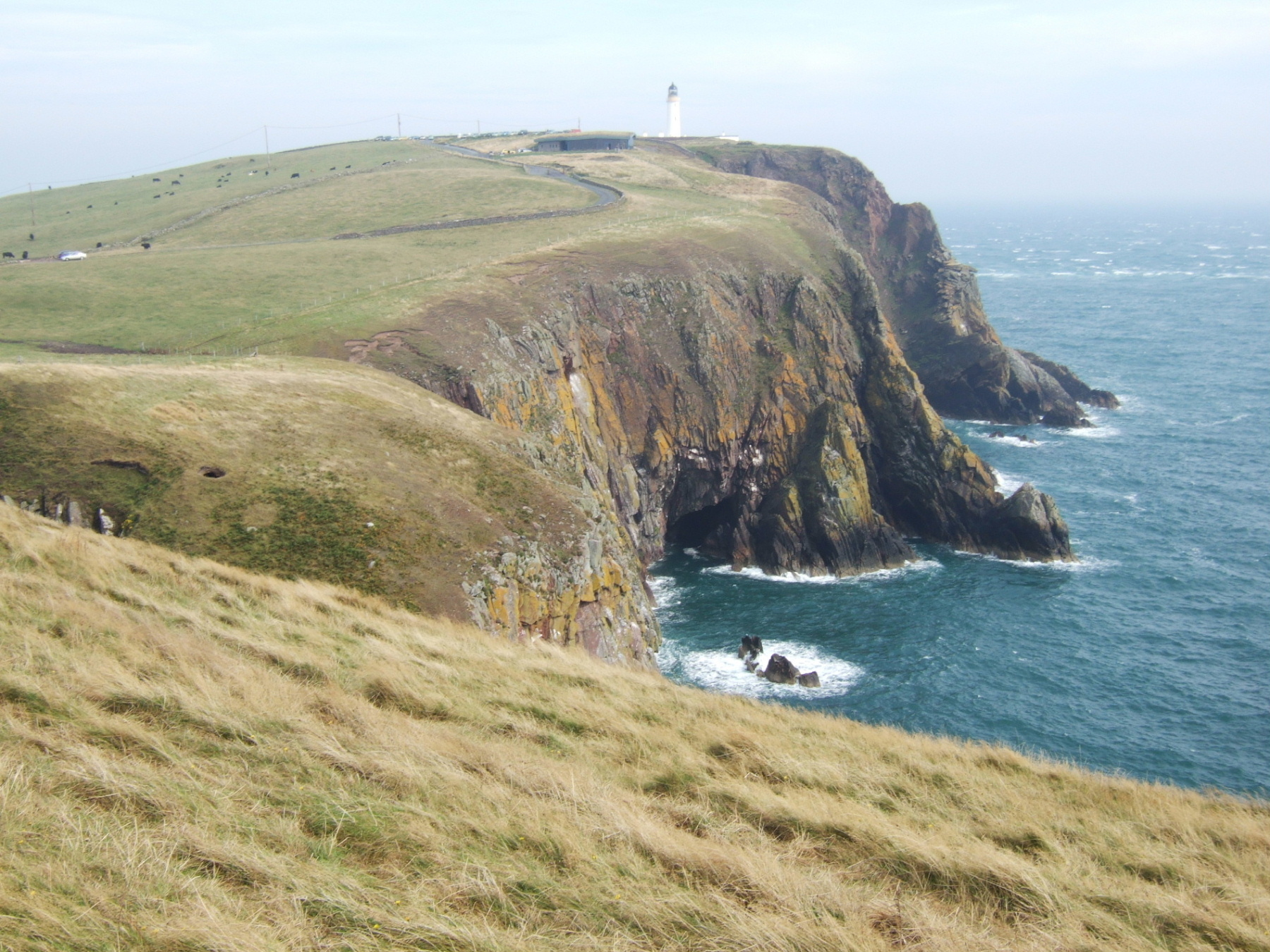
Mull of Galloway headland.

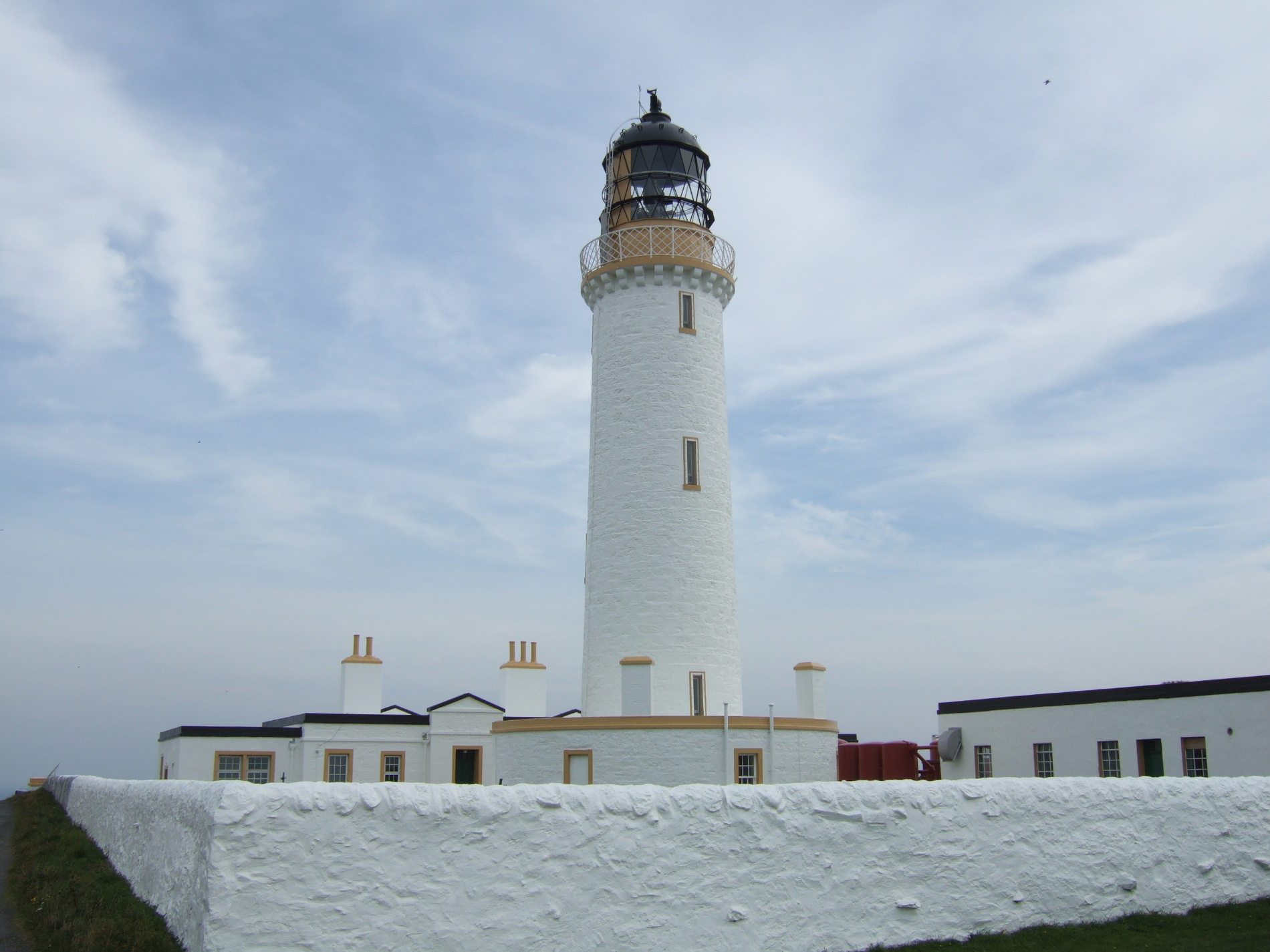
Mull of Galloway Lighthouse.

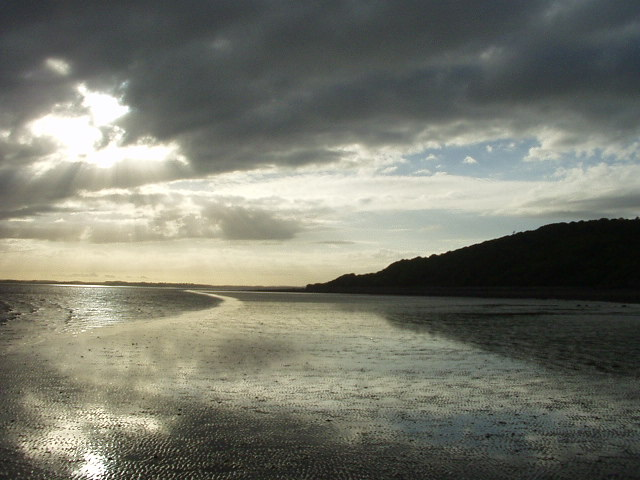
A Machars beach.

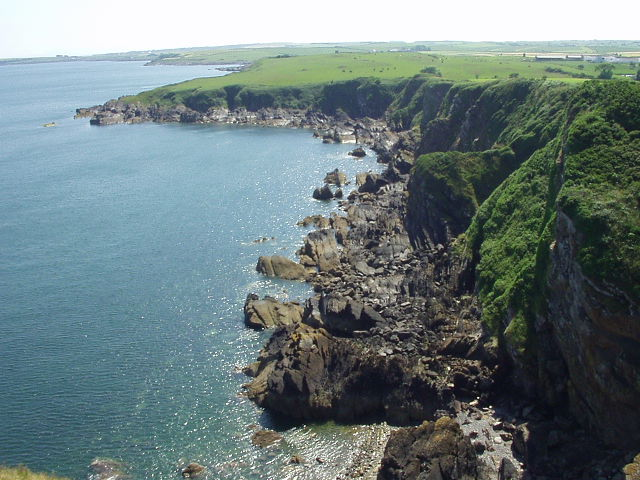
Machars Coastline looking south from Cruggleton Castle.

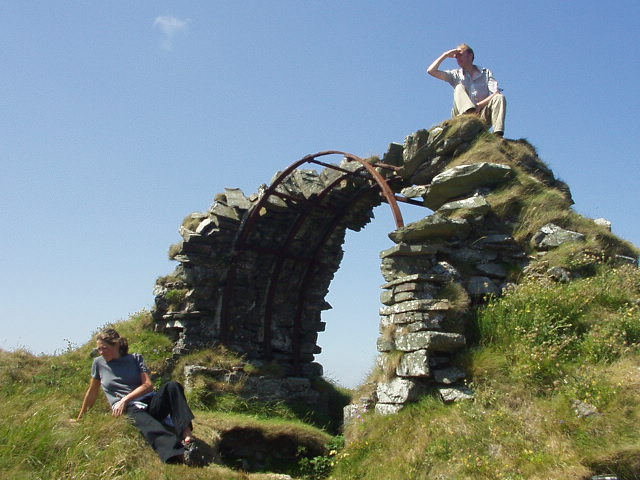
The remains of Cruggleton Castle.

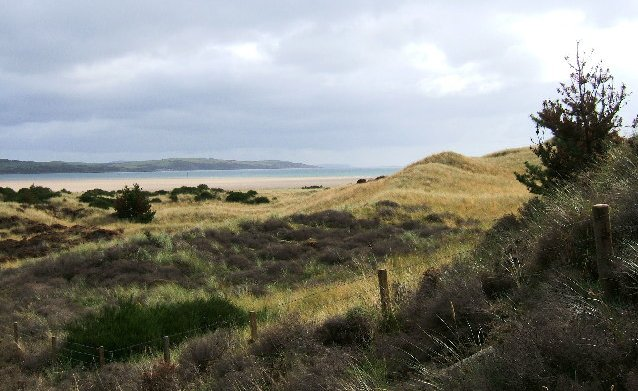
The Machars, as viewed from Torrs Warren with Luce Bay standing between.

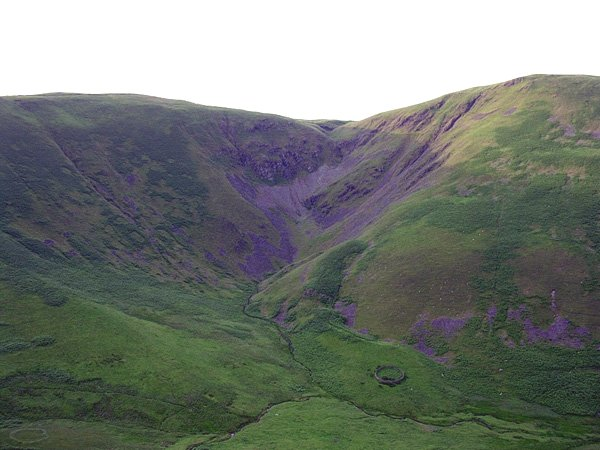
The Devil's Beef Tub.

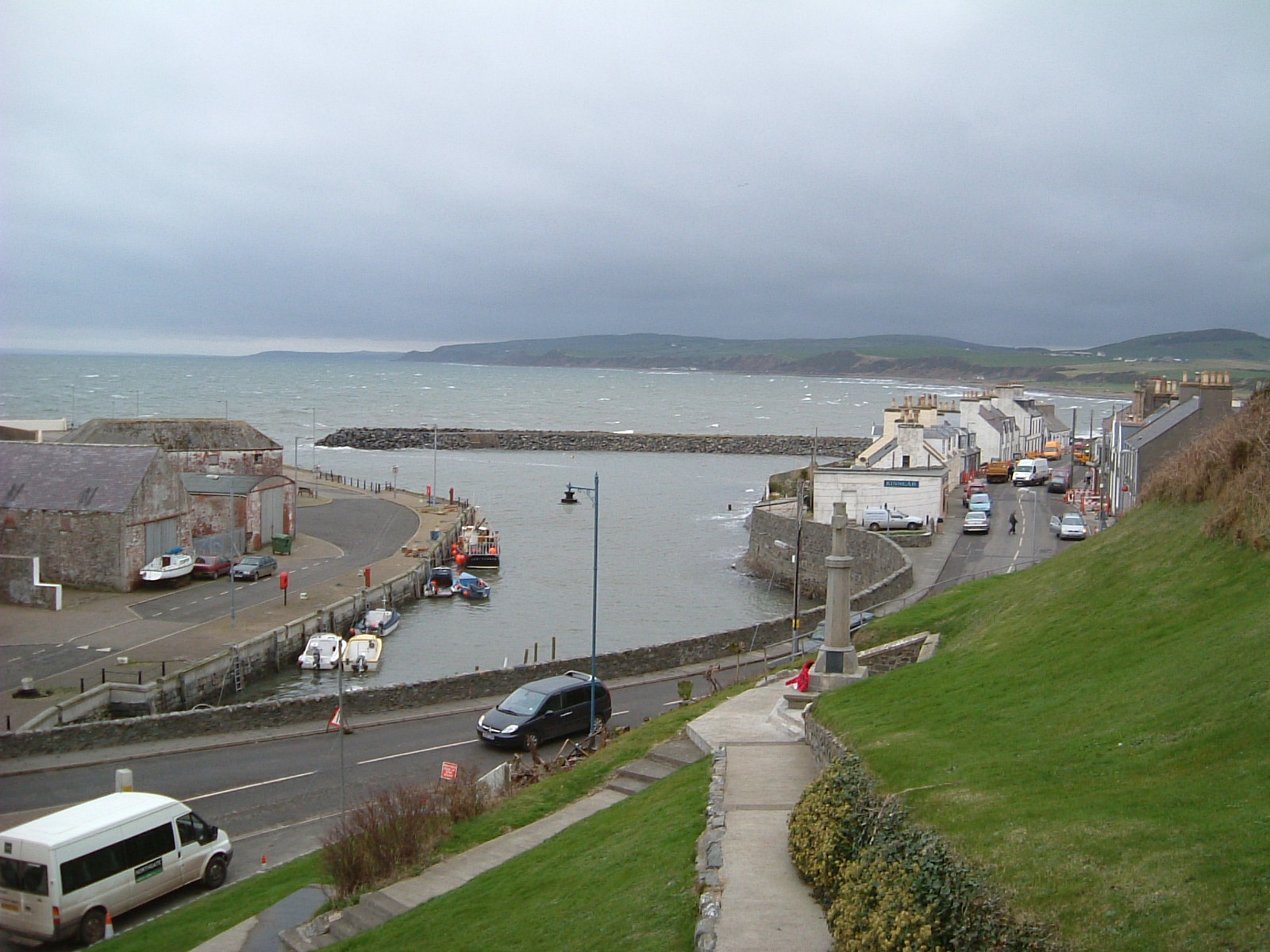
Port William harbour.

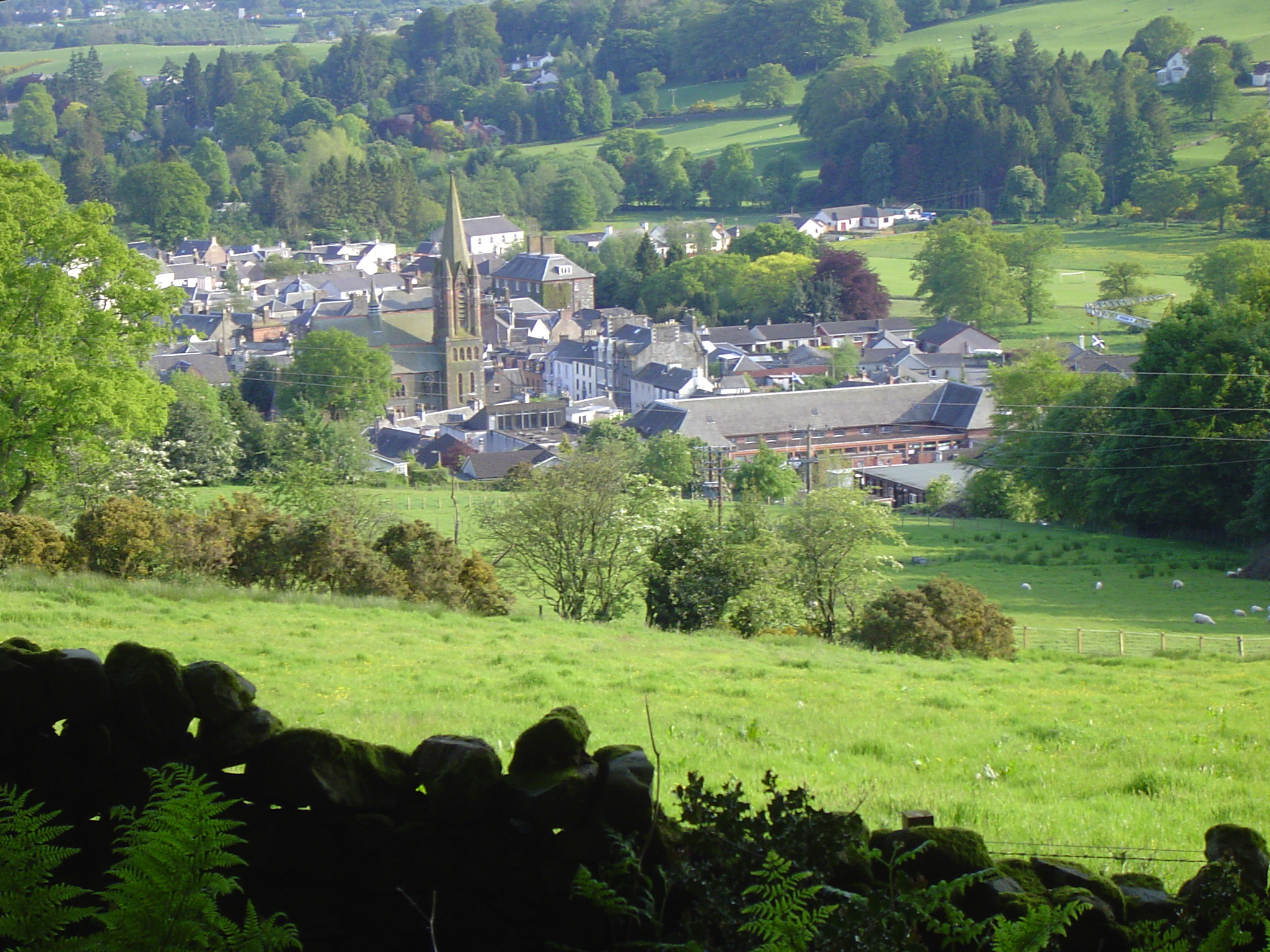
Moffat.

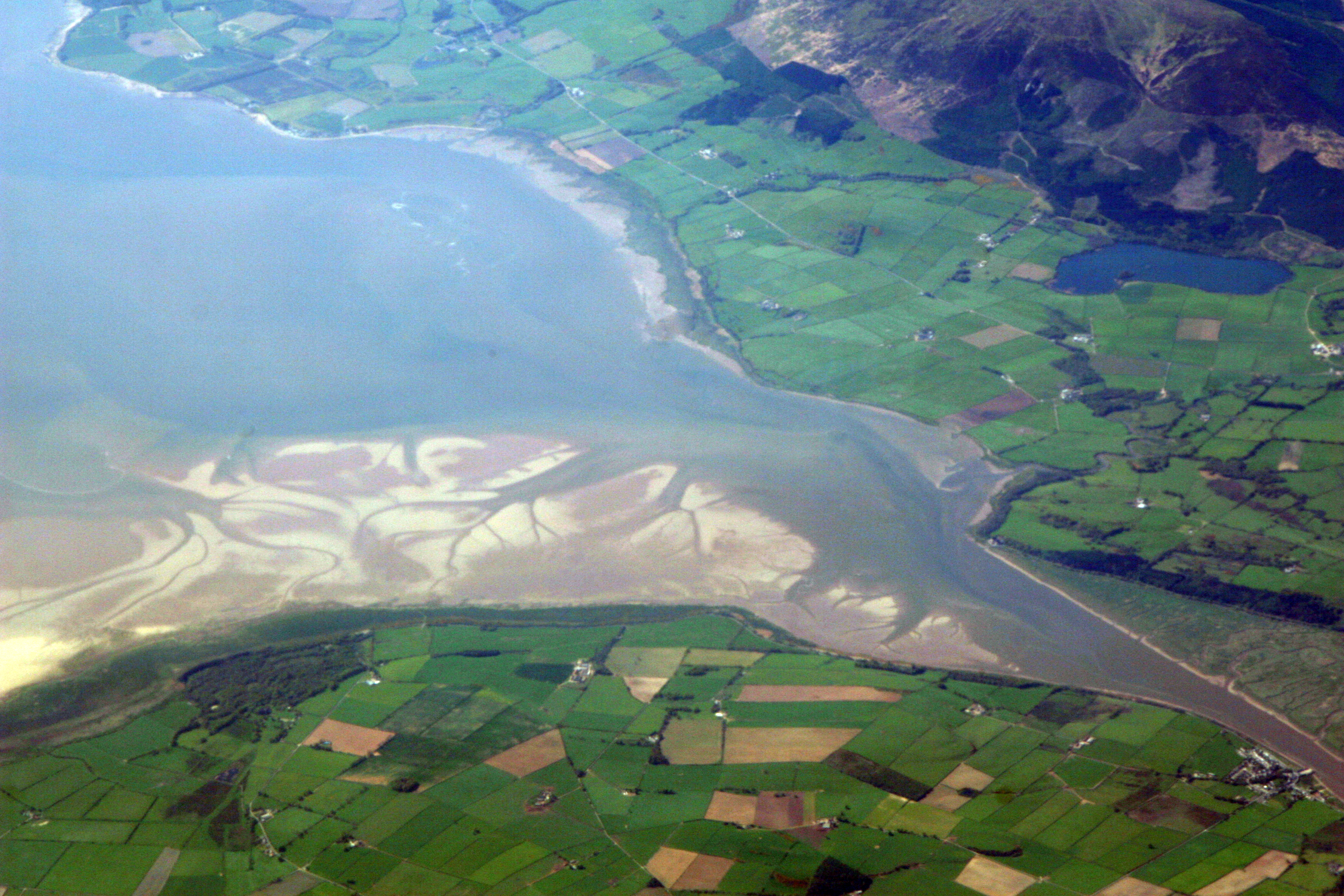
River Nith Estuary.

== See also ==
- Anglo-Scottish border
- Fire and Rescue Authority (Scotland)
- List of places in Dumfries and Galloway
