= List of places in Dumfries and Galloway =

List of settlements in Dumfries and Galloway area

This List of places in Dumfries and Galloway is a list of links for any town, village, hamlet in the historic counties of Kirkcudbrightshire, Dumfriesshire and Wigtownshire within the Dumfries and Galloway council area of Scotland.

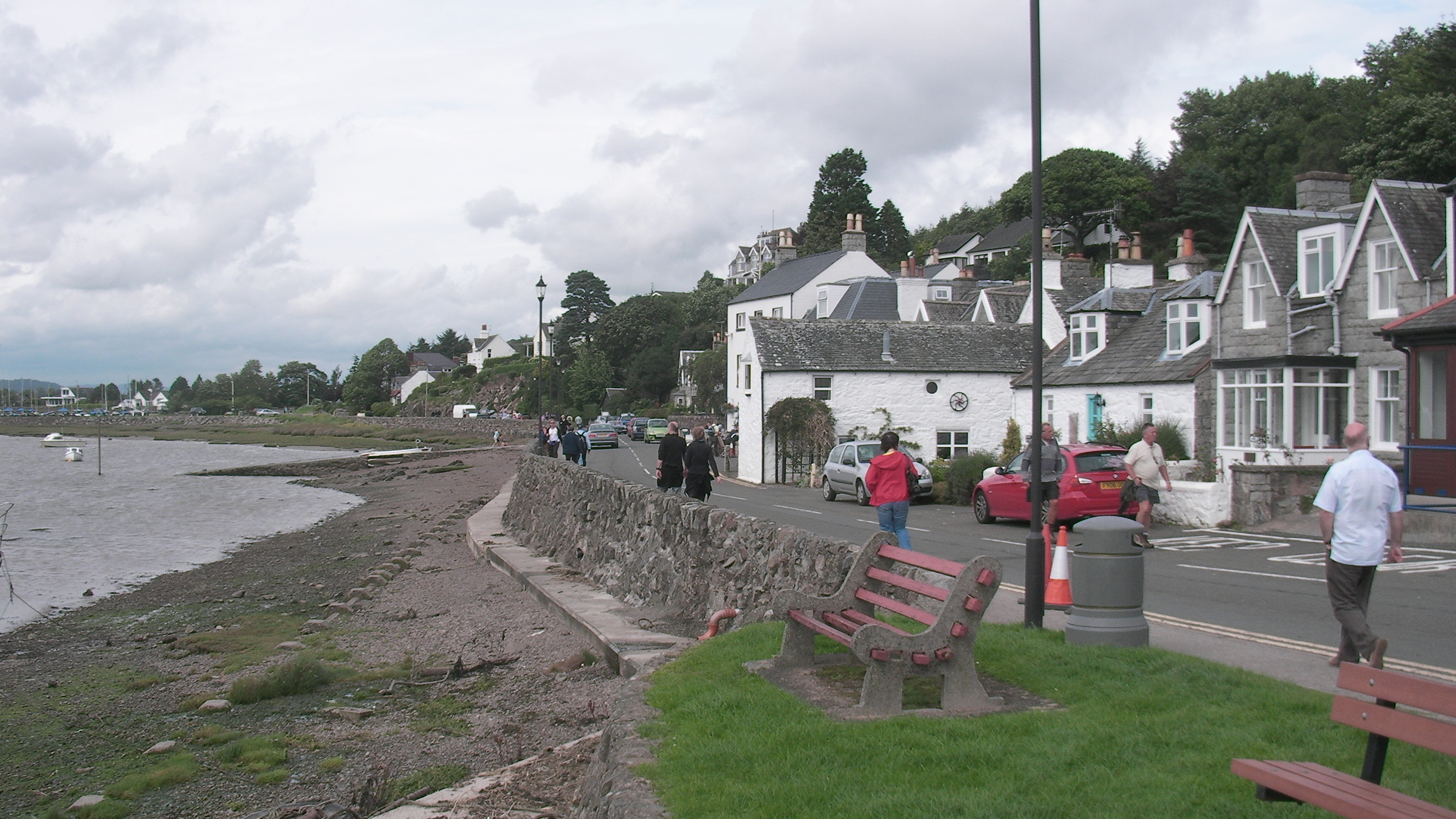
Kippford near Dalbeattie, Kirkcudbrightshire

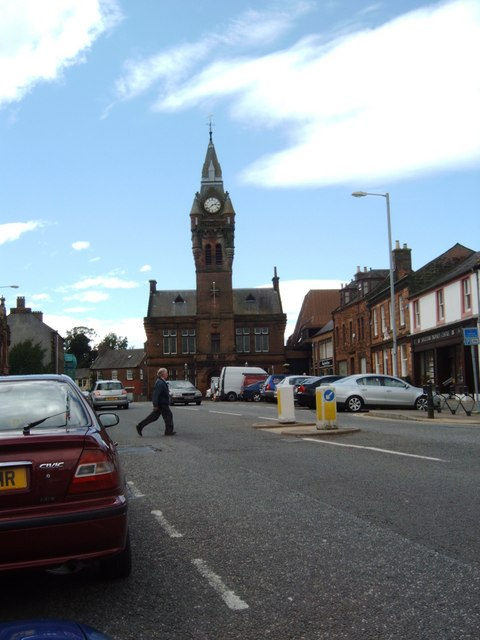
Annan, Dumfriesshire, town centre

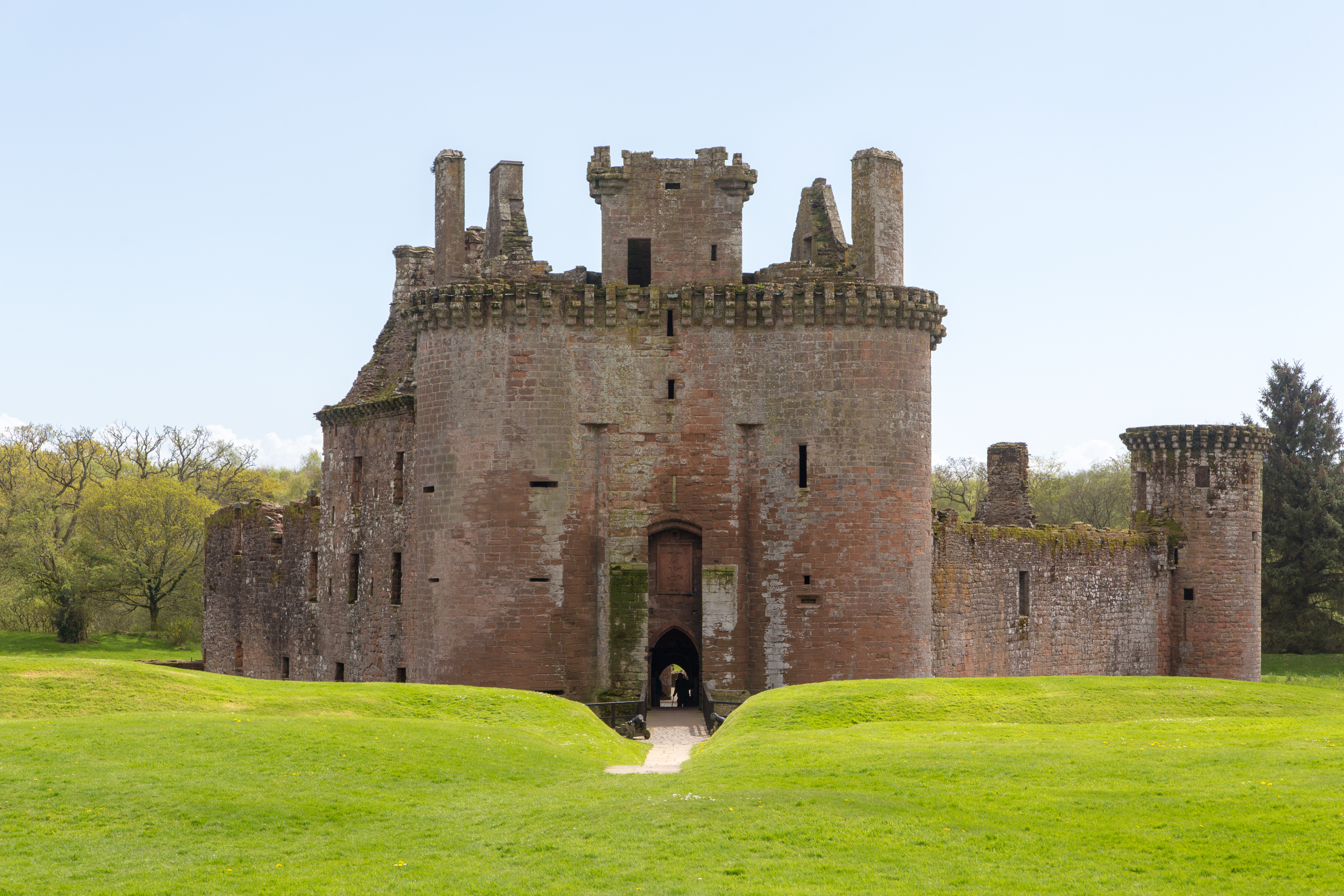
Caerlaverock Castle, Dumfriesshire

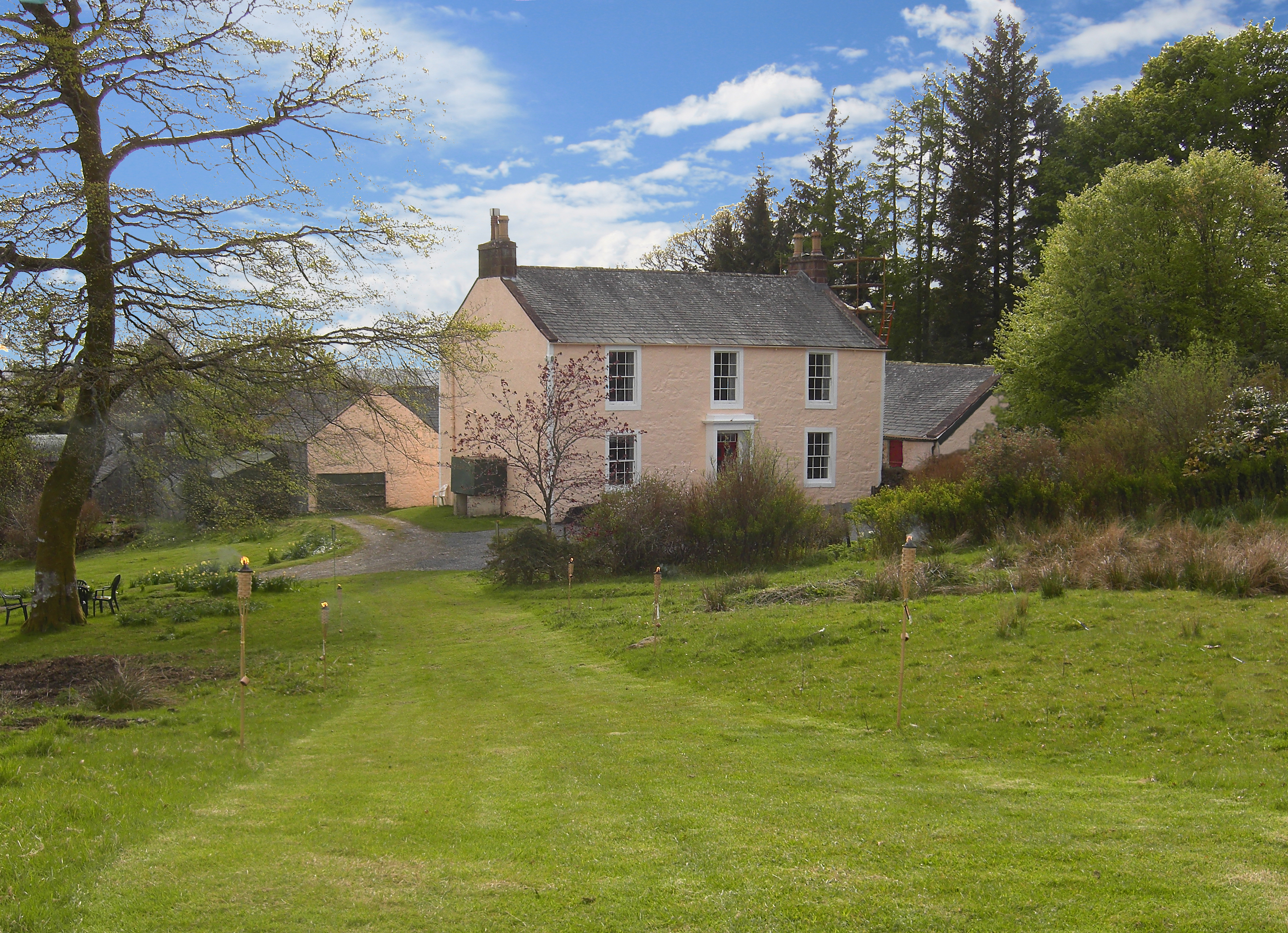
Craigenputtock, Dumfriesshire

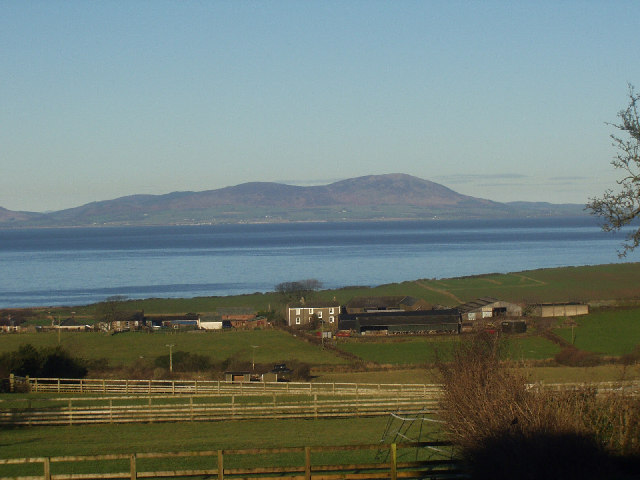
Criffel, Kirkcudbrightshire

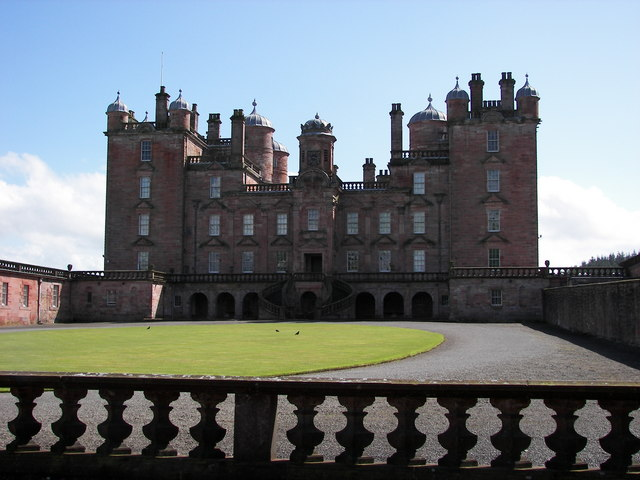
Drumlanrig Castle, Dumfriesshire

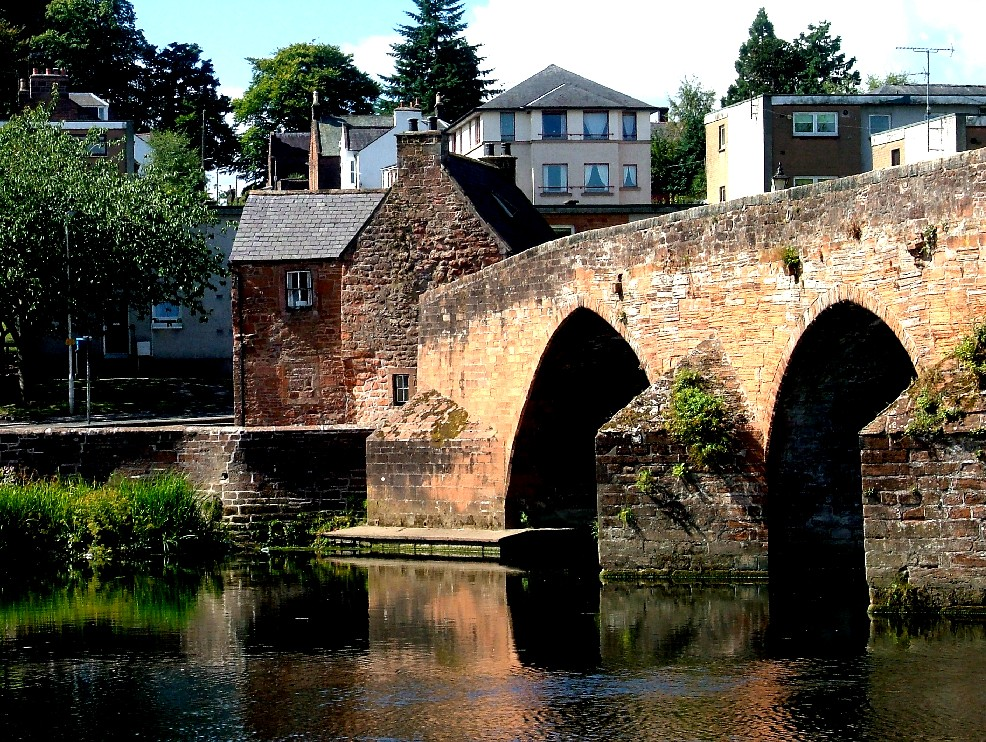
Devorgilla Bridge, Dumfries

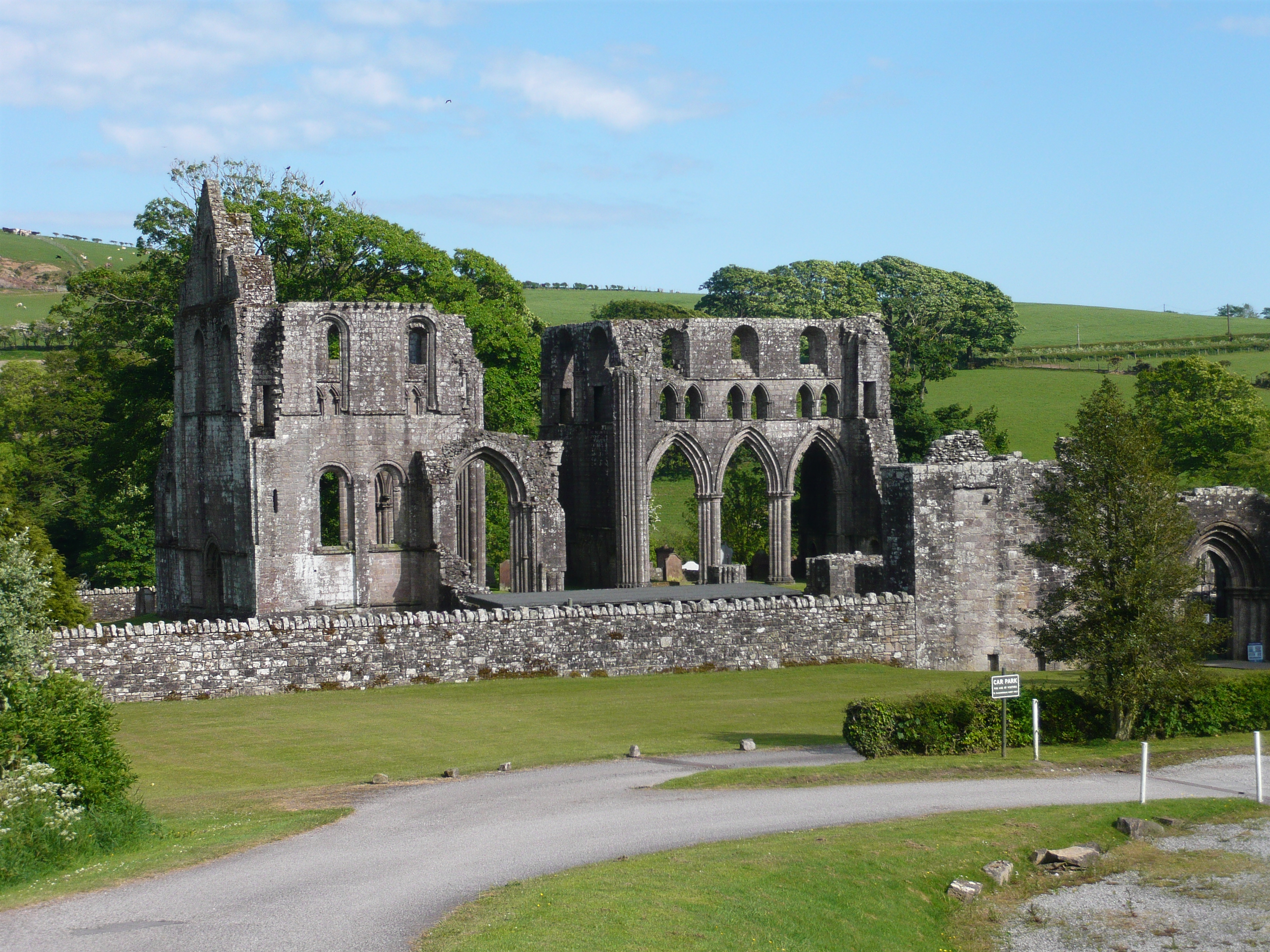
Dundrennan Abbey, Kirkcudbrightshire

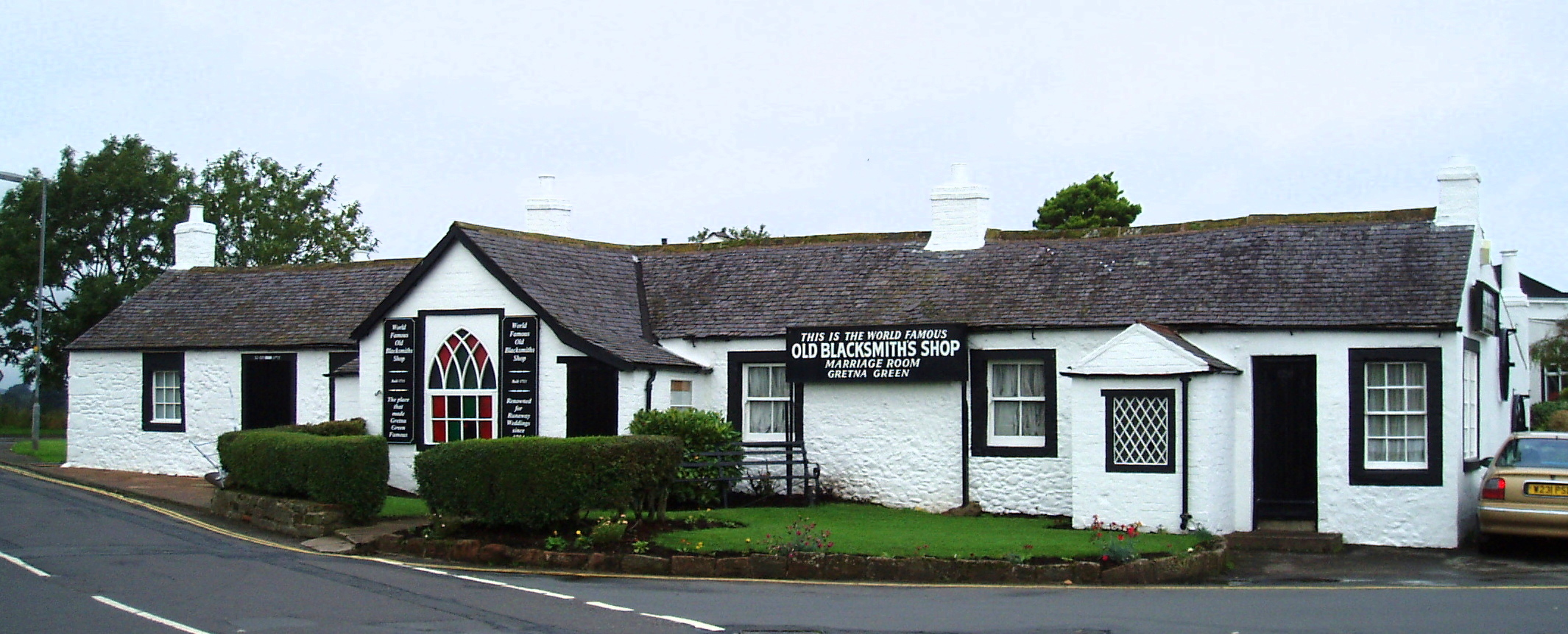
Old Blacksmiths Shop Gretna Green, Dumfriesshire

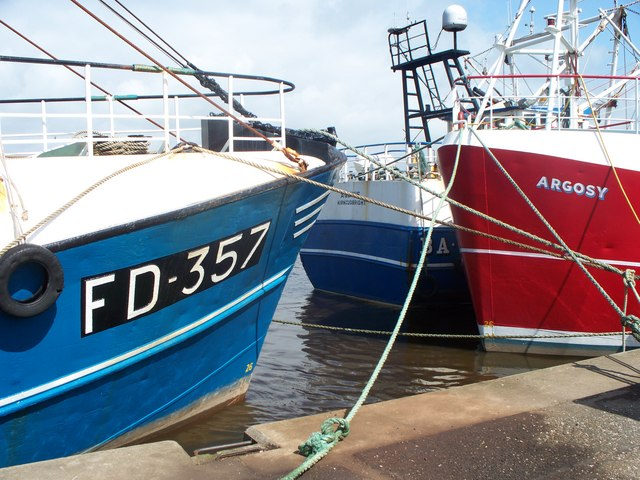
Fishing boats at Kirkcudbright Harbour

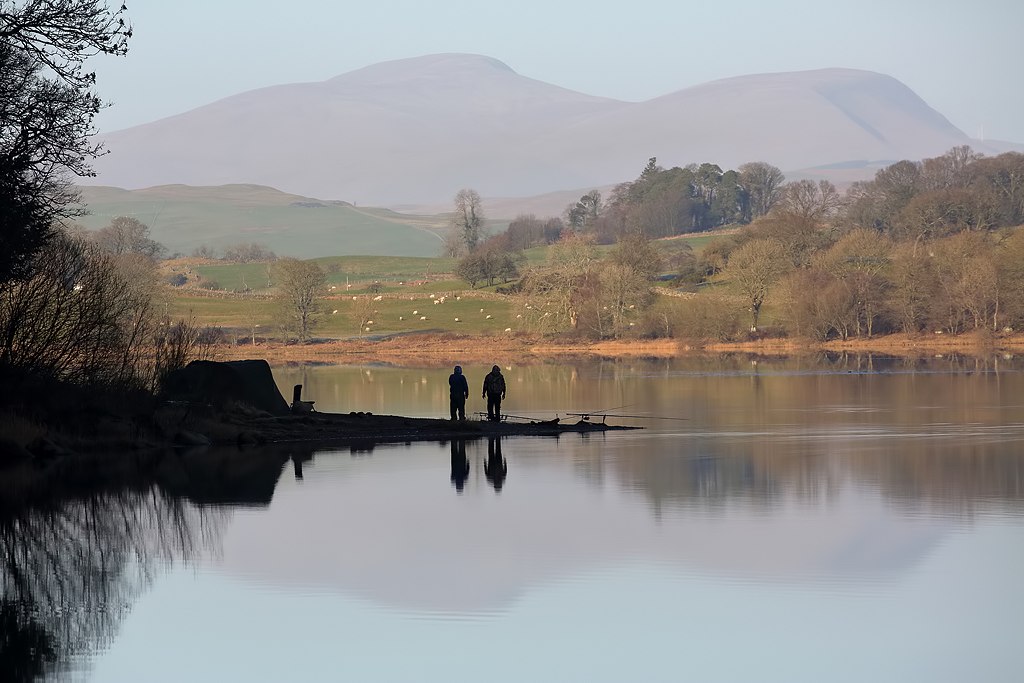
Anglers, Loch Ken, Kirkcudbrightshire

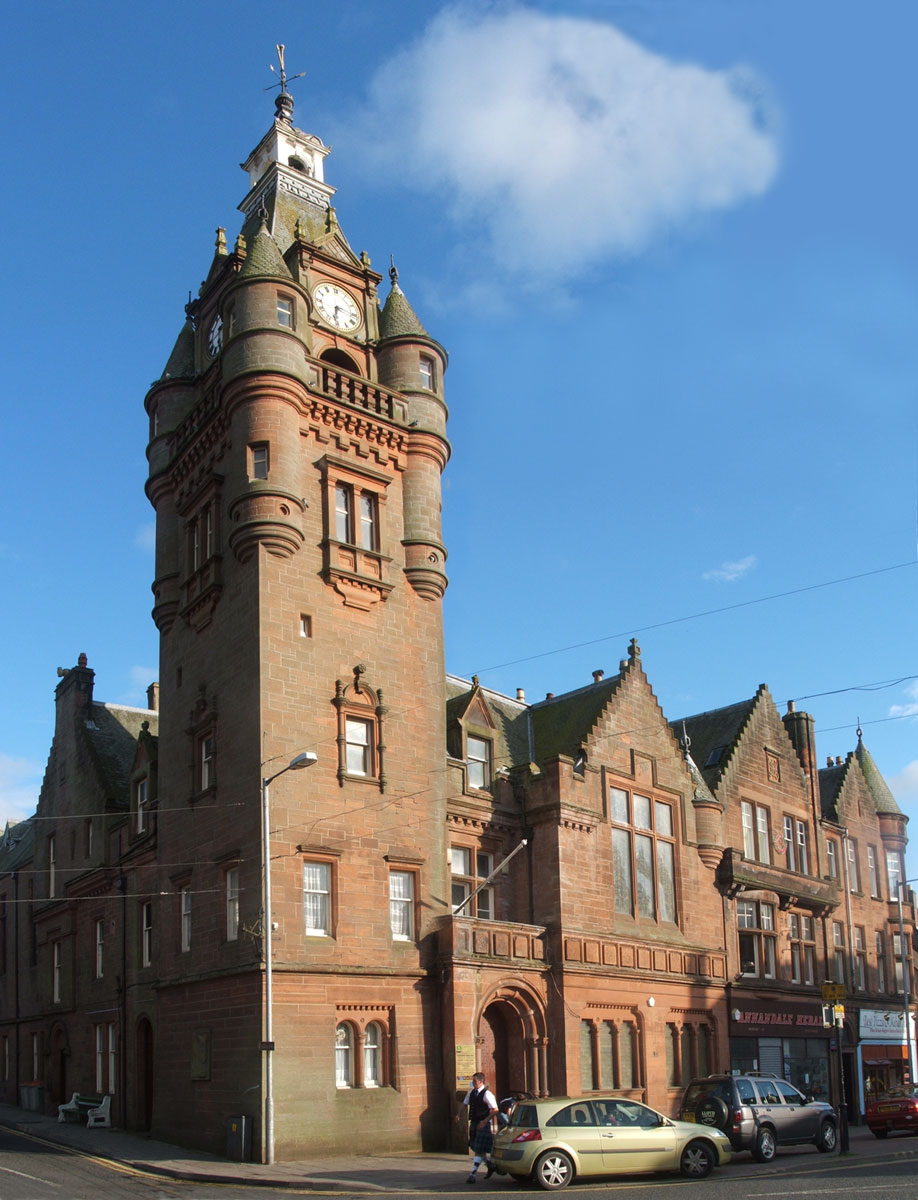
Lockerbie, Dumfriesshire, Town Hall

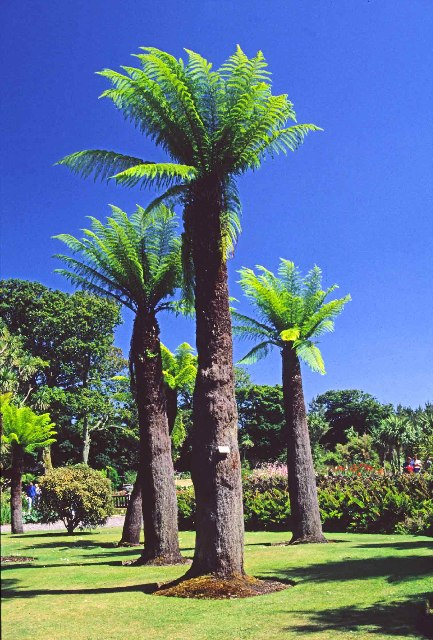
Logan Botanic Garden, Wigtownshire

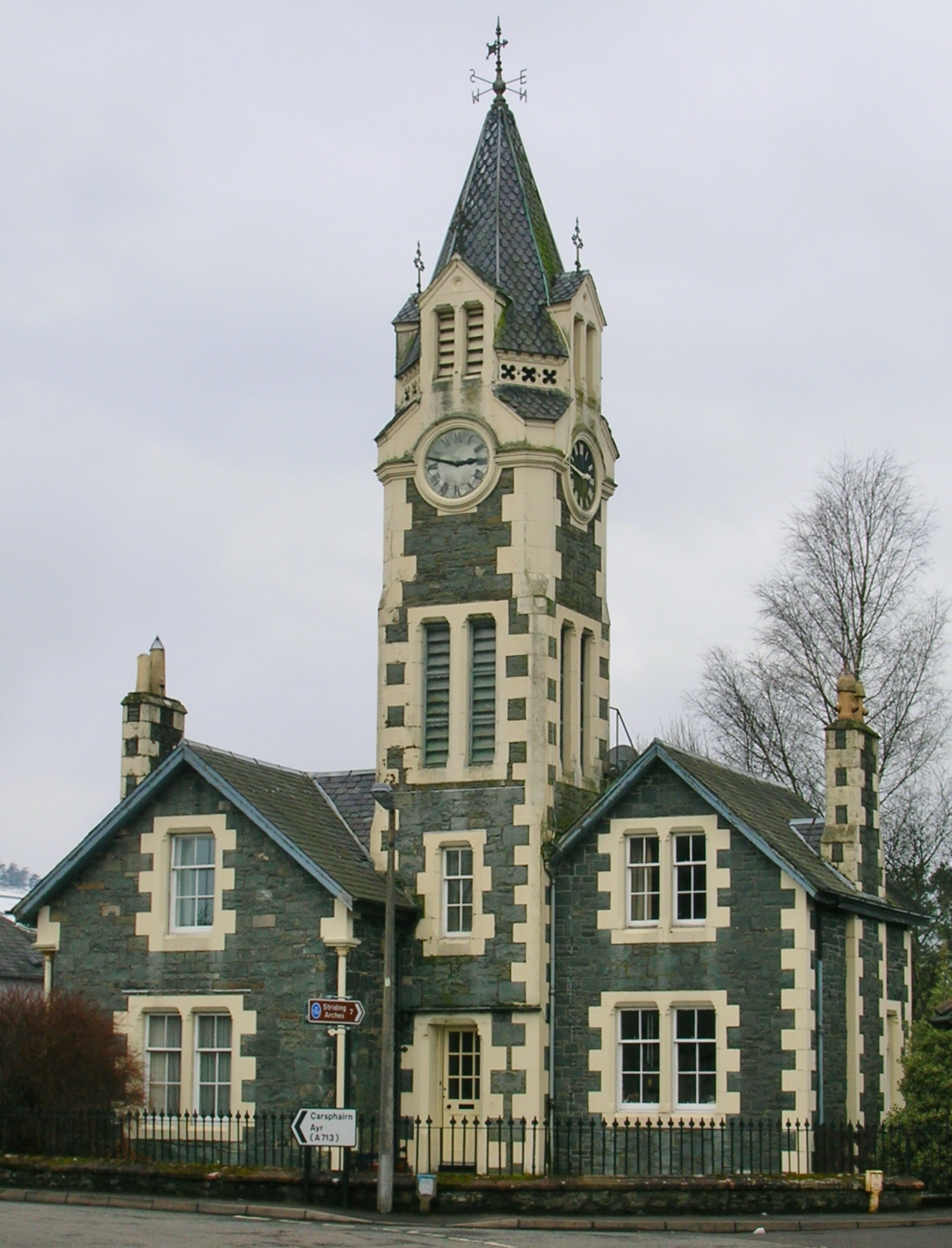
Moniaive, Dumfriesshire, clock tower

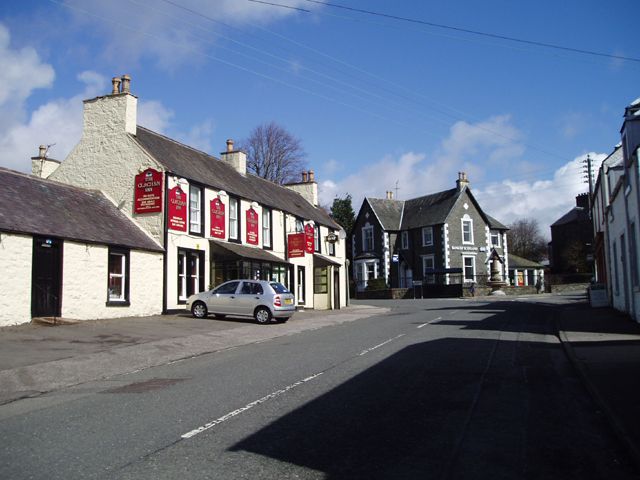
St. John's Town of Dalry, Kirkcudbrightshire

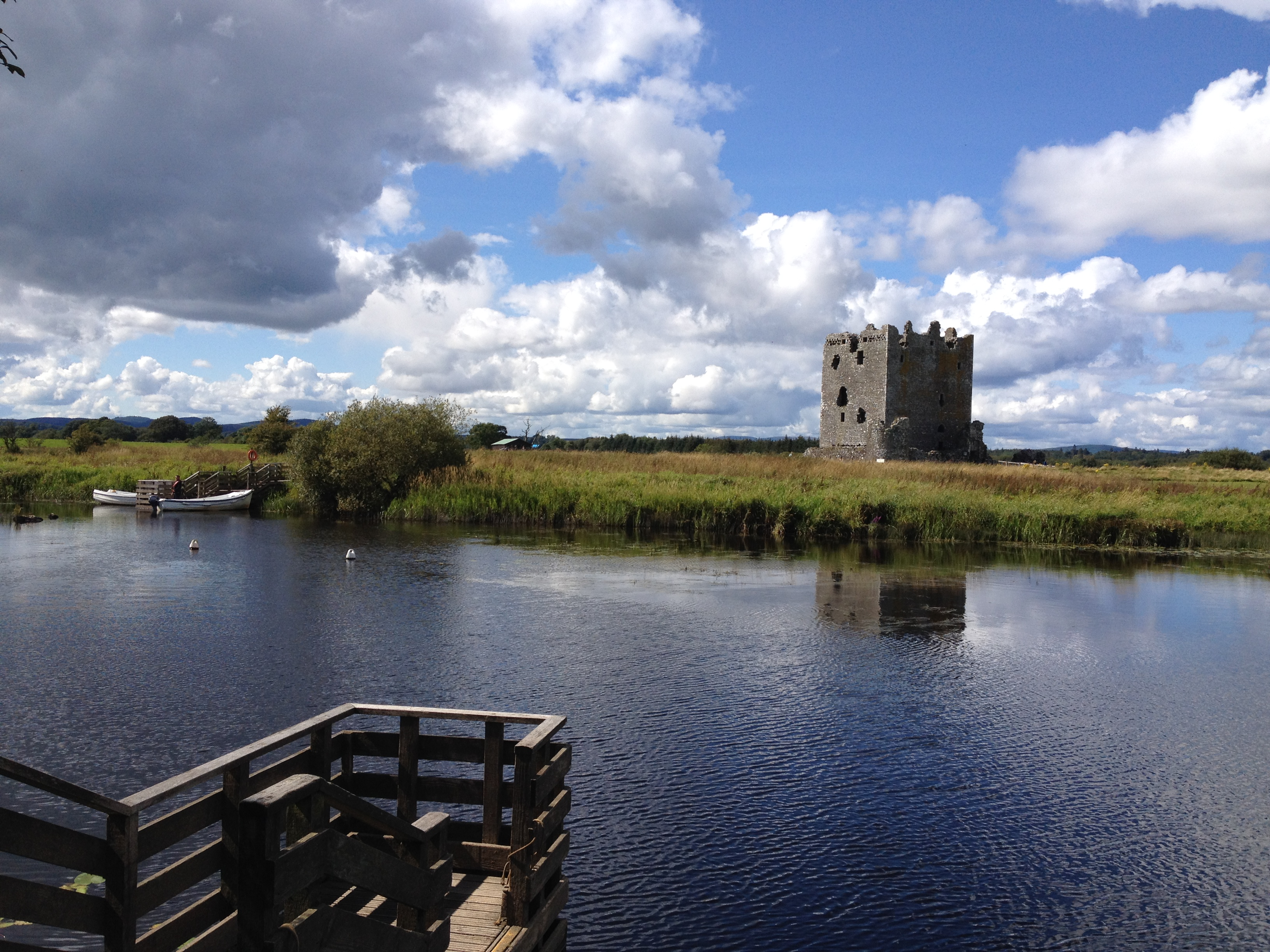
Threave Castle and island on river Dee, Kirkcudbrightshire

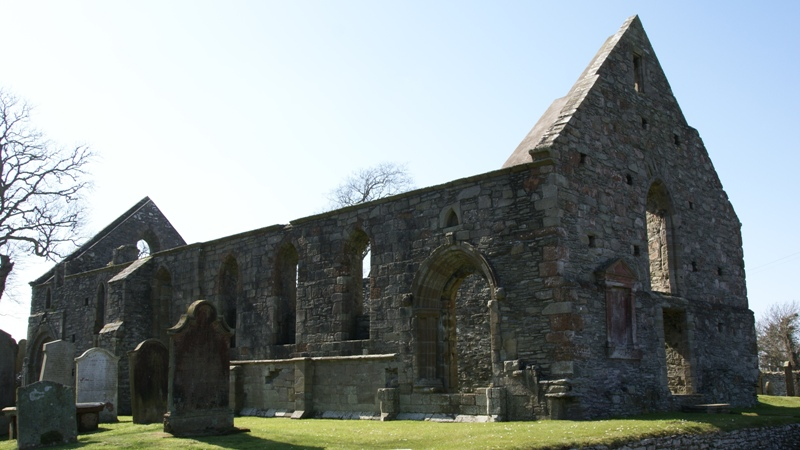
Whithorn, the Priory church of St Ninian, Wigtownshire

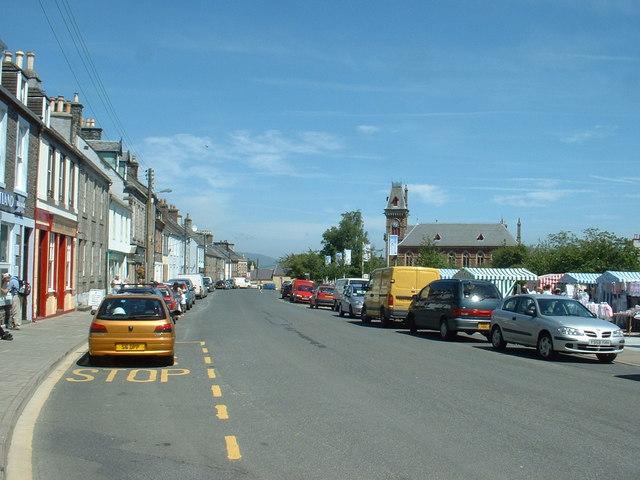
Wigtown, Scotland's Book Town

== A ==
- Ae
- Airds of Kells
- Airieland
- Amisfield
- Anglo-Scottish border
- Annan
- Annandale
- Anwoth
- Ardwell
- Auchen Castle
- Auchencairn

== B ==
- Balcary Point
- Balmaclellan
- Balmaghie
- Bankend
- Bargrennan
- Beattock
- Beeswing
- Bogrie Hill
- Bogue
- Borgue
- Bridge of Dee
- Brydekirk

== C ==
- Caerlaverock, Caerlaverock Cairn, Caerlaverock Castle, Caerlaverock NNR,
- Cairngaan
- Cairn Valley, Cairn Valley Light Railway
- Cairnryan
- Canonbie
- Cardoness Castle
- Cargenbridge
- Carrutherstown
- Carsphairn
- Castle Douglas, Castle Douglas Art Gallery, Castle Douglas and Dumfries Railway
- Castle Kennedy
- Chapelcross nuclear power station
- Clarebrand
- Clarencefield
- Cornharrow Hill
- Corsewall, Corsewall Lighthouse
- Corsock
- Craigenputtock
- Creetown
- Criffel
- Crocketford
- Crossmichael
- Cummertrees

== D ==
- Dalbeattie
- Dalton
- Dornock
- Drumcoltran Tower
- Drumlanrig, Drumlanrig Castle
- Drummore
- Dryfesdale
- Dryfe Water
- Dumfries, Dumfries railway station
- Dundrennan, Dundrennan Abbey, Dundrennan Range
- Dunscore

== E ==
- Eaglesfield
- Eastriggs
- Ecclefechan
- Eskdalemuir

== G ==
- Galabank
- Galloway
- Garlieston
- Gatehouse of Fleet
- Gatelawbridge
- Glencaple
- Glencartholm
- Glenkiln Sculpture Park
- Glenlochar
- Glenluce
- Greenhillstairs
- Gretna
- Gretna Green

== H ==
- Haugh of Urr
- Heathhall, Dumfries
- Hoddom, Hoddom Castle, Hoddom Mains

== I ==
- Isle of Whithorn
- Islesteps

== J ==
- Johnstonebridge

== K ==
- Keir
- Kenmure Castle
- Kingholm Quay
- Kippford
- Kirkbean
- Kirkbride
- Kirkcolm
- Kirkconnel railway station,
- Kirkconnel,
- Kirkconnell Flow,
- Kirkcowan
- Kirkcudbright
- Kirkpatrick Durham
- Kirkpatrick-Fleming

== L ==
- Langholm
- Lauriston
- Leadhills and Wanlockhead Branch, Leadhills and Wanlockhead Railway,
- Lincluden Collegiate Church
- Locharbriggs
- Lochmaben
- Lockerbie, Lockerbie railway station
- Lowther Hills

== M ==
- Machars
- MacLellan's Castle
- Middlebie
- Millhousebridge
- Moffat
- Moniaive
- Mossdale
- Motte of Urr
- Mouswald
- Mull of Galloway

== N ==
- New Abbey
- New Galloway
- New Luce
- Newton Stewart
- Newton Wamphray
- Nithsdale

== P ==
- Palmerston Park
- Parton
- Penpont
- Polharrow Burn
- Port William
- Portpatrick, Portpatrick and Wigtownshire Joint Railway
- Palnackie

== R ==
- Rhins of Galloway
- Rigg
- Ringford
- River Annan, River Esk, River Nith
- Robgill Tower
- Ruthwell, Ruthwell Cross

== S ==
- Samye Ling Monastery and Tibetan Centre
- Sandhead
- Sanquhar, Sanquhar Castle, Sanquhar railway station
- Scaur Water
- Shinnel Water
- Solway Firth, Solwaybank
- Southern Upland Way
- Southerness, Southerness Lighthouse
- Springfield
- Springholm
- Stair Park
- Stewartry Museum
- St. John's Town of Dalry
- St. Mungo's Church
- Stranraer, Stranraer railway station
- Sweetheart Abbey

== T ==
- Templand
- Terregles
- Thornhill
- Threave Castle, Threave Gardens
- Torthorwald
- Twynholm
- Tynron

== U ==
- Unthank
- Urr Water

== W ==
- Wanlockhead
- Water of Ken
- Waterbeck
- Whithorn
- Wigtown
- Wildfowl and Wetlands Trust

== See also ==
- List of places in Scotland
