= Wood of Cree =

Nature reserve in Dumfries and Galloway, Scotland

- Interactive map of Wood of Cree
- Type: Woodland
- Location: Minnigaff, Dumfries and Galloway, Scotland
- Nearest town: Newton Stewart
- Coordinates: 55.005°N 4.530°W
- Area: 690 hectares (1,700 acres)
- Operator: RSPB
- Status: SSSI
- Website: https://www.rspb.org.uk/reserves-and-events/reserves-a-z/wood-of-cree/

Wood of Cree is a nature reserve in Dumfries and Galloway, Scotland. Located approximately 4 miles (6.4 km) north north-west of Newton Stewart, it is managed by the Royal Society for the Protection of Birds.

Consisting of about 690 acres, it is Southern Scotland's largest ancient woodland, and is home to around 113 bird species. It is also considered one of the best bluebell carpet sites in Scotland.

In 2006, the RSPB bought out the adjacent Barclye Farm, consisting of some 996 acres with the intent of extending the woodland by a further 670 acres. It will eventually allow users to walk through around 18 km of uninterrupted deciduous forest.
