= Johnsfield =

Village in Dumfries and Galloway, Scotland

Coordinates: 55°07′40″N 3°22′46″W

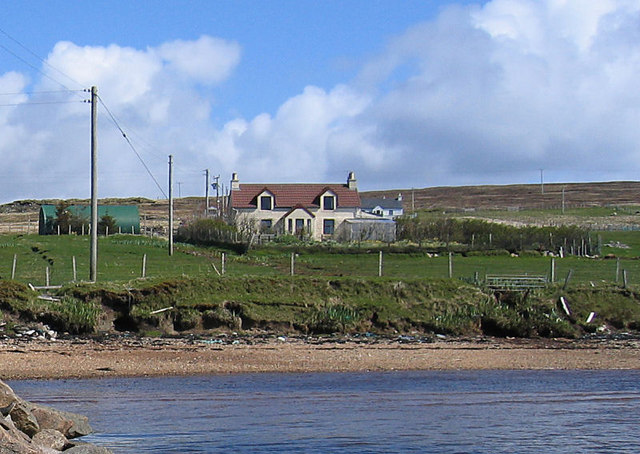
Johnsfield, Sellafirth

Johnsfield is a settlement near Lockerbie in Dumfries and Galloway, Scotland.
