= Houston's Restaurant =

American steakhouse chain

- Type: Wholly owned subsidiary
- Industry: Restaurants
- Genre: Casual fine dining
- Founded: 1977; 49 years ago in Nashville, TN
- Founder: George Biel
- Headquarters: Phoenix, Arizona, U.S.
- Number of locations: 38 (under various names)
- Area served: United States
- Products: American cuisine
- Parent: Hillstone Restaurant Group, Inc.
- Website: www.hillstone.com

Houston's Restaurant is part of a group of upscale American casual dining restaurants, owned by Hillstone Restaurant Group, whose main corporate headquarters is in Phoenix, Arizona. There are 38 Hillstone locations in 10 states.

== Company profile ==
The first Houston's restaurant was launched by current owner and CEO George Biel, Joe Ledbetter, and Vic Branstetter in 1977 in Nashville, Tennessee. Bransetter sold his shares in 2006, and Ledbetter in 2011, leaving George Biel sole owner of the company. The corporate company, Hillstone Restaurant Group, Inc. (formerly Houston's Restaurants, Inc.), was founded in 1976 and owns the following restaurants: Gulfstream, Bandera, Rutherford Grill, Palm Beach Grill, Cherry Creek Grill, Los Altos Grill, Woodmont Grill, R+D Kitchen, Hillstone, the Honor Bar, Honor Market, South Beverly Grill, East Hampton Grill, White House Tavern, and Houston's. As of 2026, the group owns and operates 38 restaurants under 14 different names in the United States.

== Dress code ==
Since the chain consider itself an "upscale casual dining" establishment, the company encourage guests to wear "smart casual" attire which can include dress shorts, and collared shirts but avoid wearing sportswear, team athletic attire, gym clothes, tank tops, athletic shorts, flip flops, hoodies, sleepwear, and excessively revealing clothing. The company will refuse service to any guest not meeting their attire standards.

== Name change of certain locations ==
Since 2009, several Houston's locations around the US have changed their names to Hillstone.

The company maintains the changes are in keeping with a long-term strategy of disassociating from the chain image to remain a niche player in the industry. The practice of changing restaurant names is not a new strategy for the company, which has similarly converted several Banderas to locally named Grills, all predating state and federal regulations. The company states that the name change was based on rebranding with a focus on more regional and less standardized fare, though as of 2023 the menus are for the most part the same across the different brands.
