= Airieland =

Coordinates: 54°53′37″N 3°56′15″W

Airieland is a farm in the historical county of Kirkcudbrightshire, in the Scottish council area of Dumfries and Galloway. It is found 3 miles (5 km) south of Castle Douglas.
