= Unthank, Dumfries and Galloway =

Coordinates: 55°14′24″N 2°58′06″W

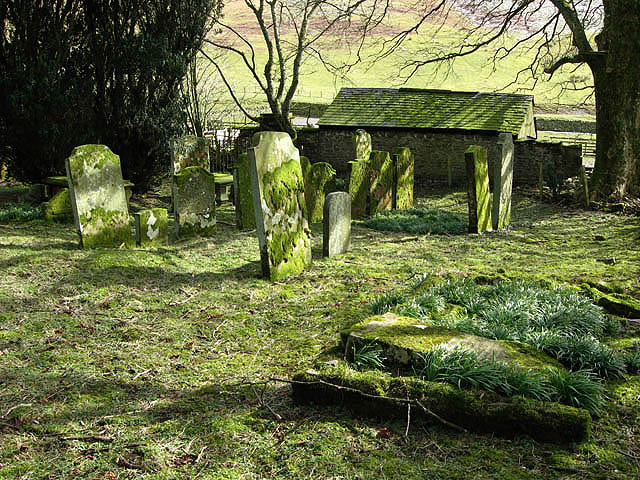
The old graveyard at Unthank

Unthank is a village in Dumfries and Galloway, Scotland.
