= Stranraer and Wigtownshire Free Press =

UK periodical

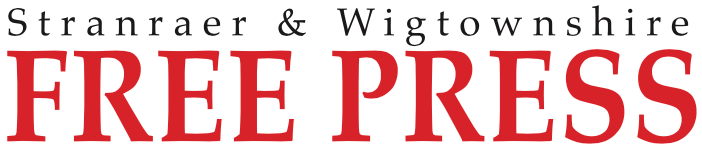
- Type: Weekly newspaper
- Format: Tabloid (since 2019)
- Owner: Stair Estates
- Publisher: Cambuslang, Glasgow
- Editor: Louise Kerr
- Founded: 1843
- Political alignment: Apolitical
- Headquarters: St Andrew Street; Stranraer, Scotland
- Readership: 2,300
- Website: Facebook

The Stranraer and Wigtownshire Free Press is a local weekly newspaper based in Stranraer, Scotland, which primarily serves Stranraer and the Rhins area but also the broader Wigtownshire region.

Known locally as the "Free Press", it is officially published every Thursday but is distributed on Wednesday afternoons. It is the most popular newspaper in Wigtownshire with, at its peak, 92% of adults living within a thirty-minute drive of Stranraer reading the paper. As of 2024, around 2,300 copies are sold each week within the Wigtownshire region. Readership has been in steady decline compared to 7,500 copies per week around a decade ago. The paper has published a copy each week for the last 183 years, only breaking its cycle for a six-month period during the COVID-19 pandemic.

The current Editor is Louise Kerr. The paper is written and produced in Stranraer by a small team of two journalists and printed in Cambuslang, Glasgow.

Previous reporters include Cameron Ritchie, Euan Maxwell, Nick Dowson, Jen Stout and Dan Palmer. Former Editors include Alan Hall and Conservative Party MP, John Cooper.

The paper features a rotating weekly column from a local politician, those who have previously written for the paper include Emma Harper, Alister Jack, Finlay Carson and Colin Smyth. Longstanding independent councillor, Willie Scobie is also known to regularly contribute with opinion write-ups.
