= Robgill Tower =

Coordinates: 55°2′1″N 3°10′39″W

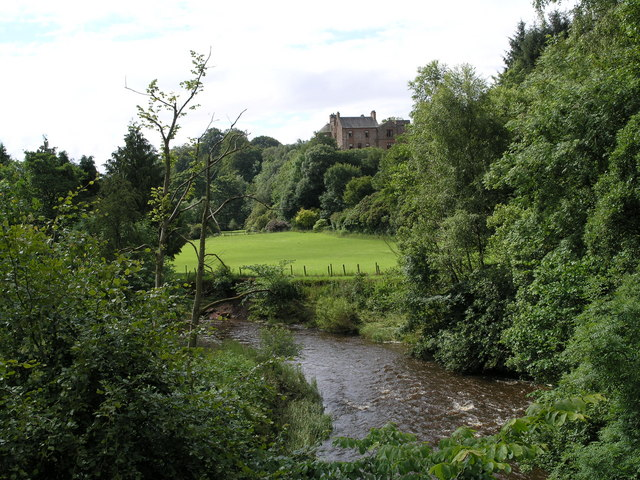
The 16th century Robgill Tower, since extended, perched on a hill overlooking the Kirtle Water

Robgill Tower is a tower house near Kirkpatrick Fleming on the banks of the river Kirtle. It was one of a number of towers built along the border as protection against incursions by the English.

The tower was owned for centuries by Clan Irvine, also spelled as Irving, but a report from 1834 indicates that it was owned by James Smail by that time. He had acquired it from Sir Emelius Irving.

== Etymology ==
The name is from the Old English personal name Hreodbeorht (modern name Robert) and Old Norse gil "ravine". The name was recorded as Redbeilgill in 1125.

== History ==
The tower was probably built circa 1540 by the Irvine family who also owned Bonshaw Tower, but some documents indicate that it was built in 1430. Robgill Tower was the "blue-print for Bonshaw Tower" (3/4 of a mile distant) which was built in the same era.

The Robgill tower was modified extensively in the 19th century. It has been B-listed since 1971. The Listing indicated that the structure - a medium scale mansion ... [with] crenellated retaining wall" - was built in several phases primarily in the late 18th and early 19th century, although the nucleus was a 16th-century tower.

A subsequent report at the time indicated that there was a "fine stable block dating from the later 19th C. and a sizeable walled garden with a large glasshouse. The stable block has gained a swimming pool and there is a large indoor equestrian arena". The stable block is also Category-B listed as are the Gate Lodge and Gate Peers. The Walled Garden is Category-C rated.

An 1889 book about the architecture of Scotland states that about ten years earlier, the tower was modified: "wilfully pulled down to the level of the hall floor" to allow for a hall that would connect it to the new, adjoining, house that was being built.

A 1993 summary of the property indicated that the current owner was a Mr. Shaw.

A 2013 prospectus provided numerous diagrams, photographs and descriptions of each element of the property. A 2019 summary stated that it had "six reception rooms, an indoor swimming pool, a games room, gym, indoor riding arena, a six-car garage and a separate two-bedroom gate lodge". The manor was restored recently and was said to have outstanding equestrian facilities".
