= Rough Firth =

Fjord in Dumfries and Galloway, Scotland

East Stewartry Coast National Scenic Area
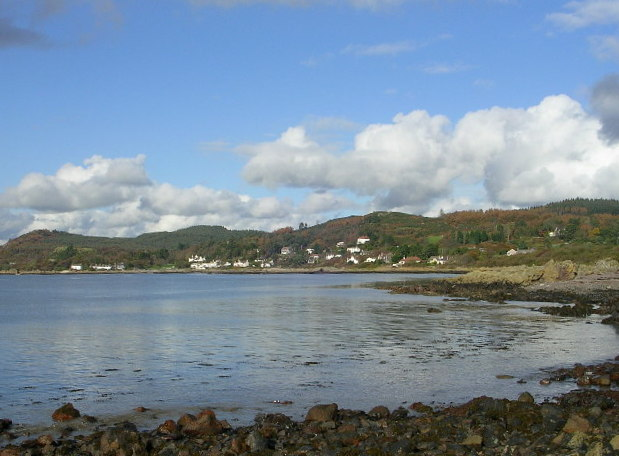
- Looking across the Rough Firth to Rockcliffe

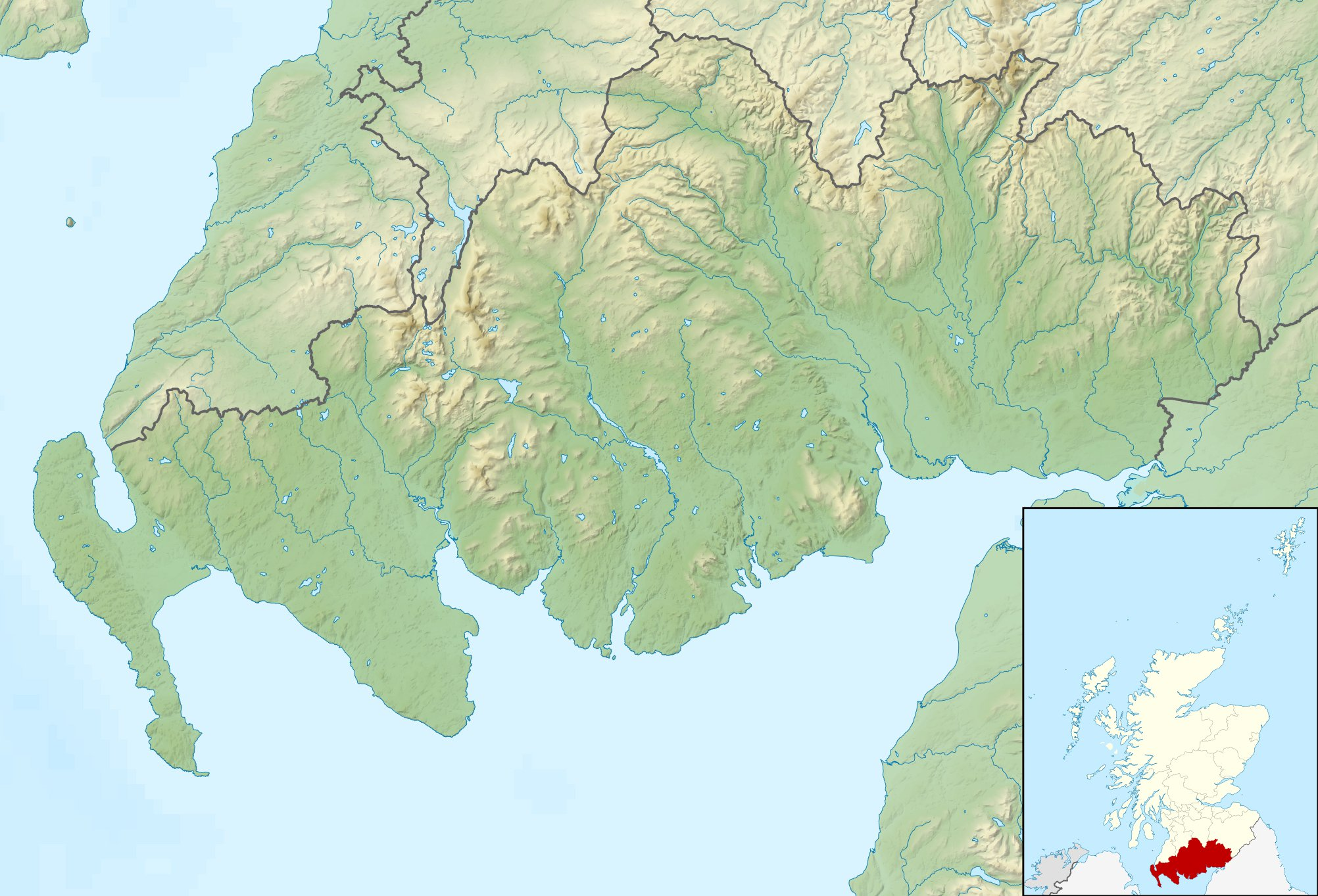
- Location within Dumfries and Galloway
- Location: Dumfries and Galloway, Scotland
- Coordinates: 54°52′N 03°49′W
- Area: 96 km^{2} (37 sq mi)
- Established: 1981
- Governing body: NatureScot

Rough Firth is an inlet on the northern coast of the Solway Firth in the Stewartry area of Dumfries and Galloway, Scotland. The firth lies between Almorness Point and Castlehill Point, and contains Rough Island. The village of Kippford stands near the head of the firth where the Urr Water reaches the sea; the only other coastal settlement of any size is Rockcliffe. The area is designated as the East Stewartry Coast National Scenic Area, one of the forty national scenic areas (NSAs) in Scotland.

44 ha on the eastern side of the firth is owned by the National Trust for Scotland, forming the Rockcliffe property, which covers a stretch of coastline and several small islands (including Rough Island).

== Description ==
The area includes several different landscapes, as identified by Scottish Natural Heritage when undertaking a review of the "special qualities" of the area in 2010:

The land is varied and interesting, with many contrasts in form and texture. Smooth mudflat and merse are present, as are gently shelving beaches and rolling farmland; also steep cliffs, rocky islands, gorsey knolls and rough moorland.

— Scottish Natural Heritage

There is a small 6th-century trading post known as the Mote of Mark, which stands on a rocky outcrop, and is owned by the National Trust for Scotland. The site was excavated in 1913, and two drystone huts were found, along with over 100 flints, which may be prehistoric in origin. Additionally, a small piece of Samian ware and a piece of a mortarium were uncovered, along with fragments of clay moulds from the early Christian period, and pieces of 9th-century glass likely to have come from the Mediterranean region.

Another historic site within the East Stewartry Coast is Orchardton Tower, a ruined tower house built in the fifteenth century. It is located 6 km south of Dalbeattie, and 2 km south of Palnackie. It is remarkable as the only cylindrical tower house in Scotland, being built around 200 years after such towers had gone out of fashion. Orchardton Tower is in the care of Historic Environment Scotland as a Scheduled Ancient Monument.

== East Stewartry Coast National Scenic Area ==
National scenic areas are defined to identify areas of exceptional scenery and to ensure their protection from inappropriate development. The areas protected by the designation are considered to represent the type of scenic beauty "popularly associated with Scotland and for which it is renowned".

The East Stewartry Coast was first defined as an NSA in 1981, and was redesignated under new legislation in 2010. The designated area covers 9620 ha in total, of which 8447 ha is on land, with a further 1173 ha being marine (i.e. below low tide level). As well as the inlet of Rough Firth and its immediate surroundings the designated area extends eastwards as far as the Mersehead Sands near the small settlement of Caulkerbush. The northern edge of the NSA borders Dalbeattie Forest.

National scenic areas are primarily designated due to their scenic qualities, however the area covered may well have other special qualities, for example related to culture, history, archaeology, geology or wildlife. Areas with such qualities may be protected via other national and international designations that overlap with the NSA designation. The East Stewarty Coast NSA overlaps partially with the Solway Firth Special Area of Conservation and Special Protection Area.
