= Buittle Bridge =

18th-century bridge in Dumfries and Galloway, Scotland

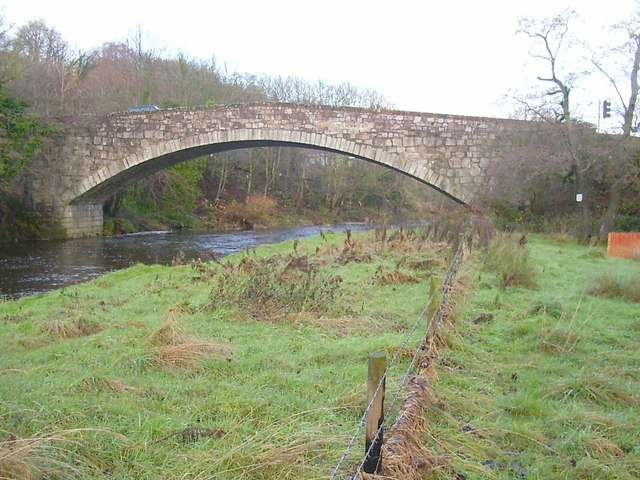
- The bridge viewed from the north-east
- Coordinates: 54.9266°N 3.8390°W
- Carries: A711
- Crosses: Urr Water
- Locale: Dumfries and Galloway
- Other name: Craignair Bridge

Characteristics
- Material: Stone: rubble and ashlar
- Longest span: 90 feet (27 m)
- No. of spans: 1

History
- Construction end: 1797

Listed Building – Category A
- Official name: Buittle Bridge, Dalbeattie (also Known As Craignair Bridge)
- Designated: 28 August 1989
- Reference no.: LB3364

Location
- Interactive map of Buittle Bridge

Buittle Bridge, also known as Craignair Bridge, is a bridge over the Urr Water just outside Dalbeattie in Dumfries and Galloway, Scotland. Completed in 1797, it replaced and earlier two-span bridge of the same name which was destroyed in a flood a short time after its completion; the remains of this older bridge, comprising the base of its pier and some remnants of its south-west abutment, survive a short distance upstream.

Buittle Bridge has a single depressed arch, with a span of approximately 90 feet (27 m), and a humpbacked carriageway. Unusually wide for a single-span stone bridge, its voussoirs, springers and soffit are made of ashlar, and its spandrels and parapet are of rubble. Historic Environment Scotland note that the masonry work on the bridge is unusually fine.

The bridge was designated a Category A listed building in 1989. It is still in use, carrying the A711 road south-west out of Dalbeattie towards Castle Douglas and Kirkcudbright, and spanning the boundary between the parishes of Haugh of Urr and Buittle.

== See also ==
- List of bridges in Scotland
