= List of listed buildings in Buittle, Dumfries and Galloway =

This is a list of listed buildings in the parish of Buittle in Dumfries and Galloway, Scotland.

== List ==
Name	Location	Date Listed	Grid Ref. (Note: Sometimes known as OSGB36, the grid reference (where provided) is based on the British national grid reference system used by the Ordnance Survey. • "Guide to National Grid". Ordnance Survey. • "Get-a-map". Ordnance Survey.)	Geo-coordinates	Notes	LB Number (Note: Historic Environment Scotland assign a unique alphanumeric identifier to each designated site in Scotland, for listed buildings this always begins with "LB", for example "LB12345".)	Image
Buittle Parish Church, (Church Of Scotland) And Walled Churchyard				54°55′10″N 3°51′41″W	Category B	3366	Upload Photo
Palnackie 1-4 Cannon Place (Inclusive Nos)				54°53′31″N 3°50′30″W	Category C(S)	3388	Upload Photo
Old Orchardton Farmhouse And Steadings To East				54°52′38″N 3°50′46″W	Category B	3369	Upload Photo
Palnackie, 6-14 (Even Nos) Port Street				54°53′32″N 3°50′24″W	Category C(S)	3371	Upload Photo
Palnackie, 1, 3 (Odd Nos) Port Street				54°53′33″N 3°50′26″W	Category C(S)	3389	Upload Photo
Buittle Old Church				54°55′08″N 3°51′42″W	Category A	3365	Upload another image
Buittle Bridge, Dalbeattie (Also Known As Craignair Bridge)				54°55′36″N 3°50′20″W	Category A	3364	Upload another image See more images
Halketleaths Farm				54°57′11″N 3°52′42″W	Category B	3368	Upload Photo
Palnackie, 16 Port Street (Bow House)				54°53′33″N 3°50′23″W	Category B	3372	Upload Photo
Buittle Place				54°56′08″N 3°50′46″W	Category B	3367	Upload Photo
Palnackie, 2-4 (Even Nos) Port Street				54°53′32″N 3°50′26″W	Category B	3370	Upload Photo
Orchardton Tower				54°52′37″N 3°50′43″W	Category A	3387	Upload another image

== Key ==
The scheme for classifying buildings in Scotland is:

- Category A: "buildings of national or international importance, either architectural or historic; or fine, little-altered examples of some particular period, style or building type."
- Category B: "buildings of regional or more than local importance; or major examples of some particular period, style or building type, which may have been altered."
- Category C: "buildings of local importance; lesser examples of any period, style, or building type, as originally constructed or moderately altered; and simple traditional buildings which group well with other listed buildings."

In March 2016 there were 47,288 listed buildings in Scotland. Of these, 8% were Category A, and 50% were Category B, with the remaining 42% being Category C.

== See also ==
- List of listed buildings in Dumfries and Galloway
