= Storm beach =

Beach affected by large waves

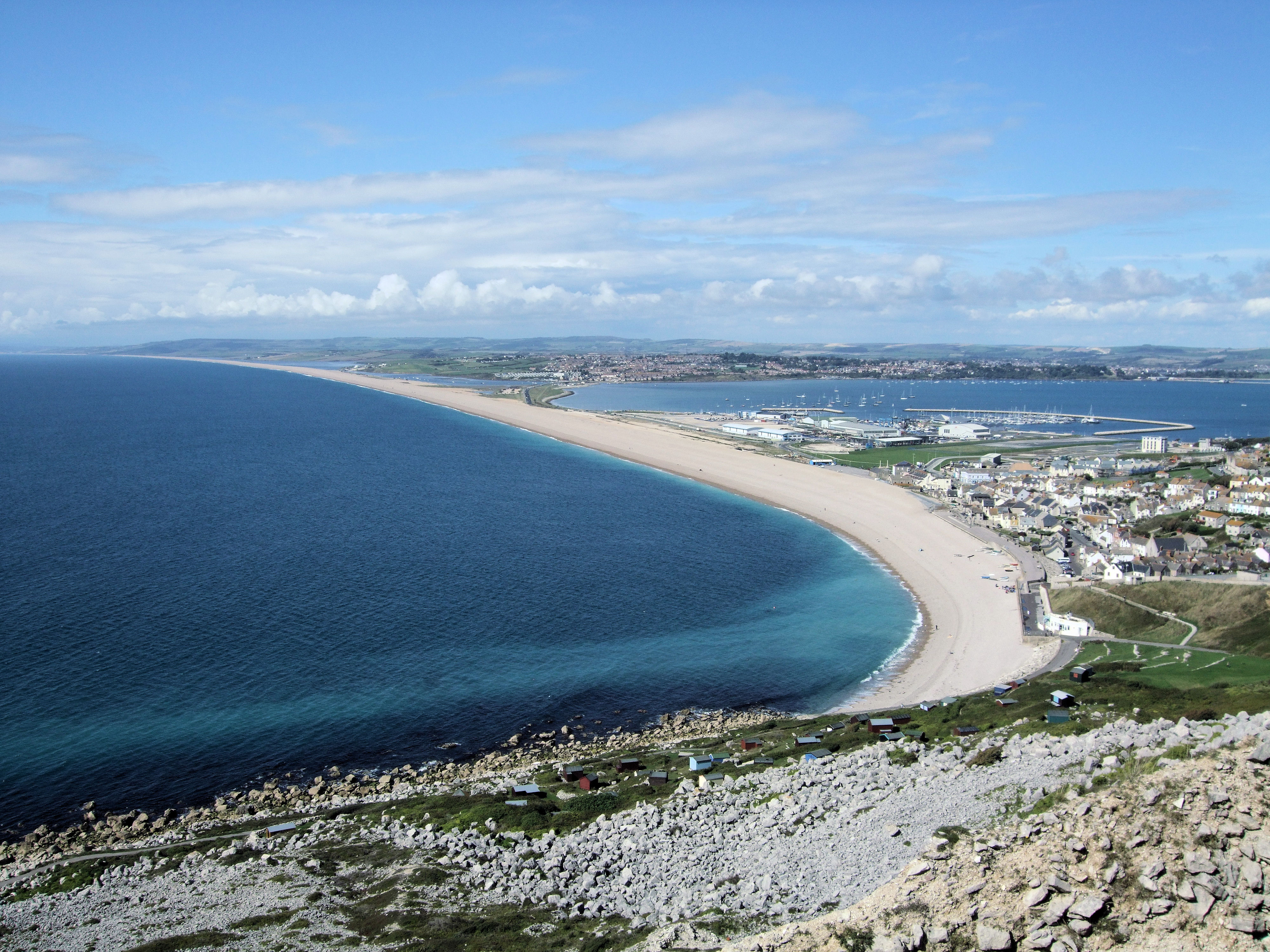
Chesil Beach from the Isle of Portland.

A storm beach is a beach affected by particularly fierce waves, usually with a very long fetch. The resultant landform is often a very steep beach (up to 45°) composed of rounded cobbles, shingle and occasionally sand. The stones usually have an obvious grading of pebbles, from large to small, with the larger diameter stones typically arrayed at the highest beach elevations. It may also contain many small parts of shipwrecked boats.

== Examples ==
A noted textbook example is the 18-mile (29 km) long Chesil Beach in Dorset, one of three major shingle structures in Britain. It also connects the Isle of Portland to the mainland at Abbotsbury, west of the resort of Weymouth. Other examples appear in the Shetland and Orkney Islands, as well as the Scottish mainland at Caithness. The beaches of Lakshdweep Islands are also storm beaches.

== Gallery ==
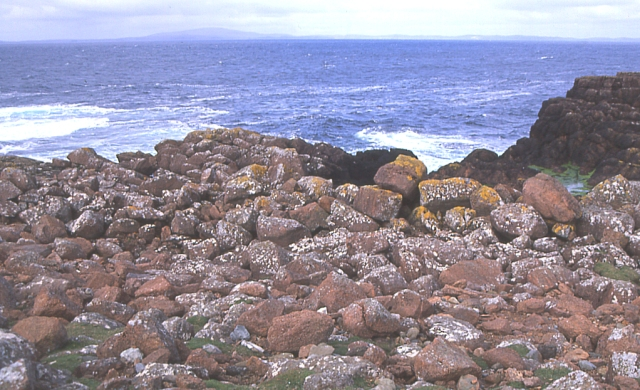
These boulders, thrown up by the waves to form a storm beach 30 metres above the sea, demonstrate the power of the sea

Shingly storm beach below a low cliff. The line of seaweed marks the high-water mark.

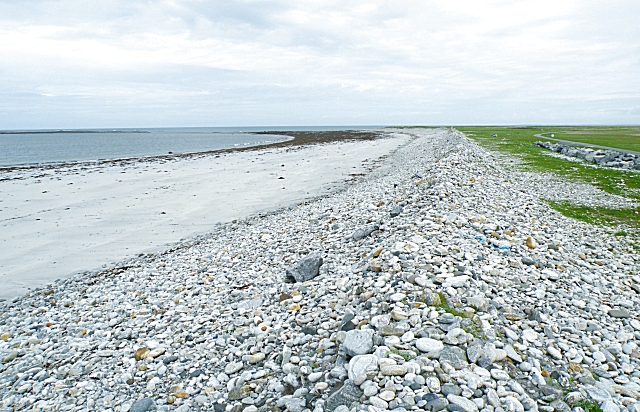
The whole length of the beach here is backed by a berm of stones, some of considerable size, which have presumably been piled up by winter storms.

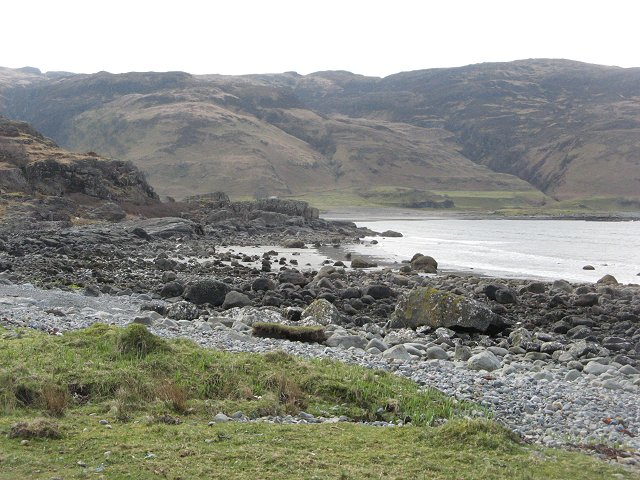
Laggan Sands at Lochbuie has a sandy beach behind a storm beach of boulders.

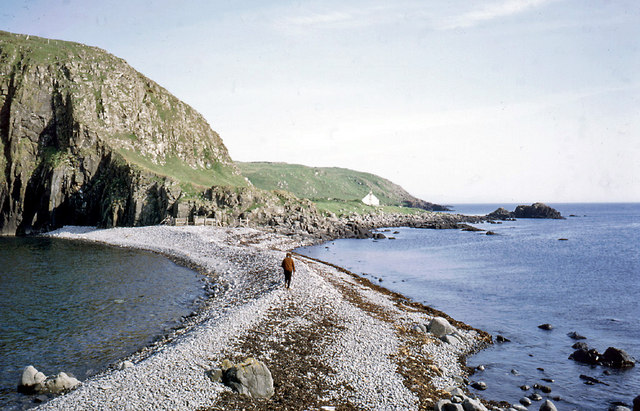
Storm beach connecting Garbh Eilean and Eilean an Tigh. The narrow neck of pebbles is covered at spring tides and during storms.
