= Flounder tramping =

Method of catching fish

Flounder tramping is a traditional method of catching flounder or other flat fish by wading in shallow water and standing on them.

This method of fishing was used in the coastal waters and river estuaries of South West Scotland, particularly at Palnackie on the Solway, for centuries. Once trapped the fish were often secured by impaling them on a leister before being bagged. A leister is the local name for a trident or three pronged long handled spear. Although traditional, the use of leisters to aid capture is no longer permitted (presumably for safety reasons).

A similar technique is still used in Cumbria, particularly in the Duddon Estuary and Morecambe Bay, where it is called treading. Treaders wade along channels at low water until they tread on a flounder; the fisher will then lift the fish by inserting a finger into the gill opening of the fish.

== Flounder tramping championships ==
On the first Saturday each August, at Palnackie, on the Urr Water, hosts the World Flounder Tramping Championships. Several hundred competitors walk out onto the mud flats of the Urr Water estuary, south of the village, at low tide. They feel for flounder hiding beneath the mud with their toes, and trap the fish beneath their feet. The competition is held to raise funds for the Royal National Lifeboat Institution.

In July 2010 Dumfries and Galloway Council announced its intention to ban the flounder tramping championships on "Health and Safety" grounds.

== See also ==
- Flounder gigging
