= Eilean Mhuire =

Island of the Shiant Islands, Outer Hebrides, Scotland

Eilean Mhuire (Gaelic)

Location
- Eilean Mhuire shown within the Outer Hebrides
- OS grid reference: NG432985
- Coordinates: 57.90°N 6.335°W

Name
- Name meaning: Gaelic for "Virgin Mary's island".

Physical geography
- Island group: Shiant Islands
- Area: 30.3 hectares (75 acres)
- Highest elevation: c.90 metres (300 ft)

Administration
- Council area: Comhairle nan Eilean Siar
- Country: Scotland
- Sovereign state: United Kingdom

Demographics
- Population: 0

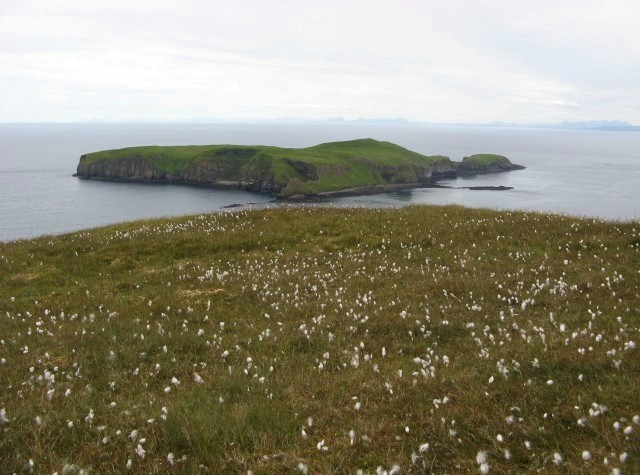
Eilean Mhuire from Garbh Eilean

Eilean Mhuire (meaning "Virgin Mary's island") is the most easterly of the Shiant Islands in the Outer Hebrides.

Once populated, Eilean Mhuire is now used only for grazing sheep. There was an old local tradition that said there used to be a chapel on the island. There are various ruins on the island, and the Ordnance Survey mark some remains as that of a “St. Mary's Chapel" on the western side of the island. But this is based only on information provided in 1851 that the island had been the refuge of a priest "in the time of Knox". Nicolson (2002) has concluded that this tradition is mistaken, but has speculated that Eilean Mhuire may instead have been a hermitage in pre-Norse times. (And there was in fact a chapel on nearby Eilean an Taighe, possibly devoted to the Virgin Mary.)

In 1549, Donald Monro, then Dean of the Isles, wrote that Eilean Mhuire was:

callit Senchastle by the Eriche, that is the alde castle ile in the Englishe, an strenthe, full of corne and grassinge, full of wyld fowls nests, and verey guid for fishing. It perteins to M’Cloyd of the Lewis. (Note: Translation from Scots: "called Senchastle in Gaelic, meaning the "old castle isle" in English, a stronghold full of corn and pasture, full of wild fowl's nests, and very good for fishing. It is owned by Clan MacLeod of Lewis.)

Today, Seann Chaisteal (“old castle”) is the name of the flat-topped tidal islet at the south-eastern extremity of Eilean Mhuire. This islet is a "large tidal rock on which there never was a building of any kind", so the name may simply have been inspired by the rock's shape and appearance.

== Notes and references ==
Notes

Footnotes

General references

- Haswell-Smith, Hamish (2004). The Scottish Islands. Edinburgh: Canongate. ISBN 978-1-84195-454-7.
- Martin, Martin (1703) A Description of The Western Islands of Scotland (Circa 1695) . Appin Regiment/Appin Historical Society. Retrieved 3 March 2007
- Monro, Sir Donald (1549) Description of the Western Isles of Scotland. William Auld. Edinburgh - 1774 edition.
- Nicolson, Adam (2002) Sea Room. London. HarperCollins. ISBN 0-00-653201-2
