= Buittle =

Civil parish in Scotland

Coordinates: 54.942°N 3.866°W

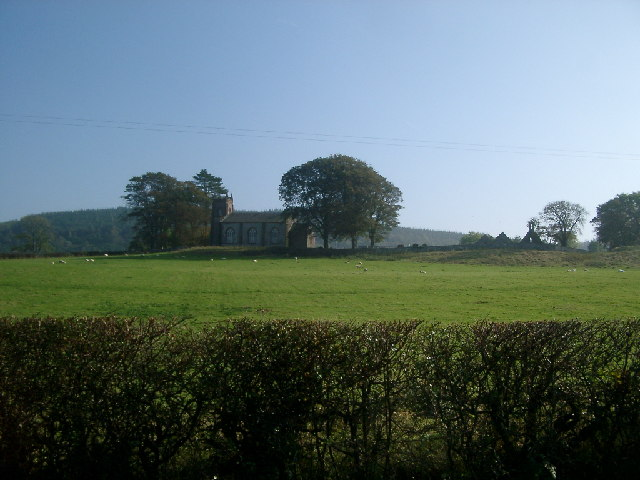
Buittle Kirk

Buittle is an ecclesiastical and civil parish in Dumfries and Galloway, southwest Scotland, in the traditional county of Kirkcudbrightshire. It lies to the west of the Urr Water, between Dalbeattie and Castle Douglas, and extends from Haugh of Urr in the north to Almorness Point on the Solway Firth in the south. The main settlement is the small village of Palnackie.

== Etymology ==
The name is derived from Old English bōtl, meaning "a dwelling, dwelling-place, house", giving Buittle the same etymology as Bootle in England.

== History ==
Northumbrian expansion into what was the kingdoms of Rheged and Strathclyde in the 7th and 8th centuries left a number of Anglian names throughout southwest Scotland, and it would appear that the name Buittle is one of these relics.

Buittle was in the semi-independent Kingdom of Galloway which is recorded between the 11th and 13th century. It remained part of that lordship until Dervorguilla, daughter of the last King, Alan of Galloway, married the Anglo-Norman John de Baliol in 1223. John and Dervorguilla raised Buittle Castle to replace an earlier motte, and the remains of the castle can still be seen.

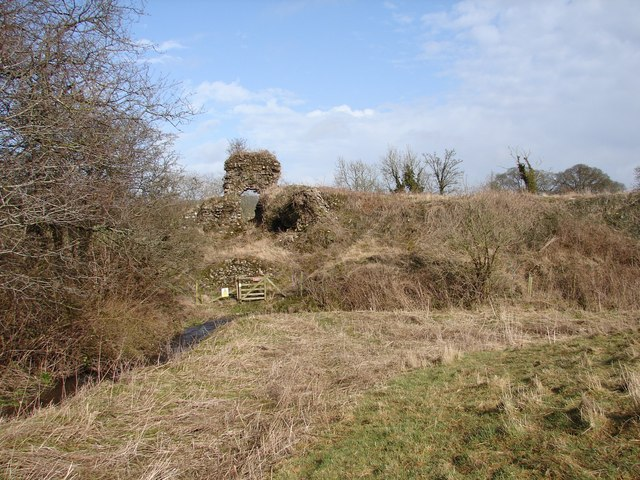
The remains of Buittle Castle

John de Baliol established Balliol College, one of the oldest colleges of the University of Oxford, in around 1263. Following his death in 1269 Dervorguilla provided the college with a permanent endowment, and her statutes of 1282 are preserved by the college. The statutes conclude with the sentence "Dat' apud Botel in octauis Assumpcionis gloriose uirginis Marie anno gracie MCC octogesimo secundo." That is, "Given at Buittle, in the octave of the Assumption of the Glorious Virgin Mary, in the year of Grace one thousand two hundred and eighty two."

Buittle became the Scottish residence of their son John Balliol, who was King of Scotland from 1292 to 1296. Galloway remained faithful to King John and his son Edward Balliol throughout the Wars of Scottish Independence, which saw the Balliols defeated the Robert the Bruce and his son David II. The latter, in 1369, appointed Archibald the Grim as Lord of Galloway, "becaus he tuke git trawell to purge the cuntrey of Englis blude". Archibald forbore to remain at Buittle and took up the residence of the older Kings of Galloway at Kirkcudbright.

Old Place of Buittle also known as Buittle Tower, late C16 fortified house.

== Buittle Parish Church ==
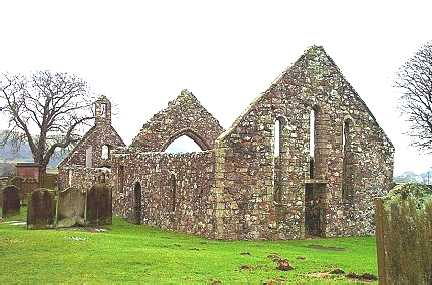
St Colman's Church, Buittle Churchyard

The present Buittle Parish Church, now closed, was built in 1818 by architect Walter Newall to replace a medieval church, the remains of which stand in the churchyard. This church was dedicated to Saint Colman, the nave has been dated to the 13th century. Around 1381 the church was given to the monks of Sweetheart Abbey at New Abbey. The old church is a scheduled monument.

== See also ==
- List of listed buildings in Buittle, Dumfries and Galloway
- Buittle Place
- Orchardton Tower
