= Shiant Islands =

Island group in the Outer Hebrides, Scotland

Coordinates: 57.90°N 6.36°W

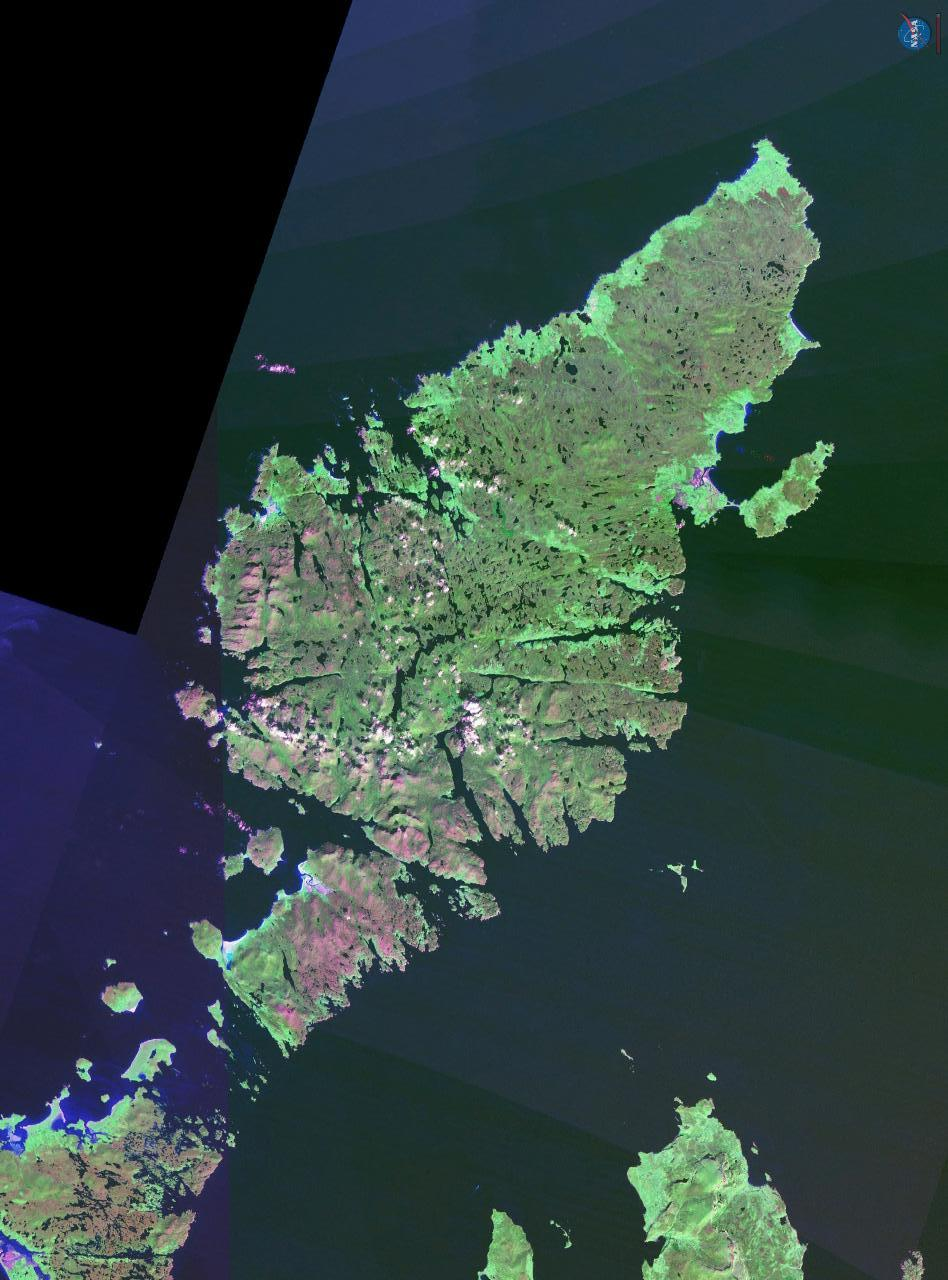
Landsat image of the Little Minch. The Shiant Islands are at centre between the much larger islands of Lewis and Harris to the north and west, and the Isle of Skye, to the south.

The Shiant Islands (/ʃænt/; Scottish Gaelic: Na h-Eileanan Mòra [nə ˈhelanən ˈmoːɾə] or Na h-Eileanan Seunta [nə ˈhelanən ˈʃiant̪ə]) or Shiant Isles are a privately owned island group in the Minch, east of Harris in the Outer Hebrides of Scotland. They are five miles (eight kilometres) southeast of the Isle of Lewis.

== Etymology ==
The name Shiant is from the Scottish Gaelic Na h-Eileanan Seunta, which could mean the "charmed", "holy" or "enchanted isles". More likely the name is from a Norse maritime term, most plausibly sjóund, meaning “sea gap / sound / cleft.” Later reshaped in Gaelic into seunta, which resembles a Gaelic adjective, and then reinterpreted through folk etymology and romantic literature as meaning “enchanted.” The Old Norse name was probably Sundeyjar meaning 'Islands of the Sound.' The group is also known as Na h-Eileanan Mòra, "the big isles". The main islands are Garbh Eilean ("rough island") and Eilean an Taighe ("house island"), which are joined by a narrow isthmus, and Eilean Mhuire ("island of the Virgin Mary") to the east. Eilean an Taighe was called Eilean na Cille ("island of the church") prior to the 19th century. (Note: Nicolson (2002) adds "hallowed", "haunted", "spooky" and "otherworldly" to the possible meanings of sénta, the Irish equivalent of the Scottish Gaelic sianta.)

A 17th-century chart by John Adair and several other 18th-century charts call Garbh Eilean Nunaltins Isle, Eilean Mhuire St Marys Isle and Eilean an Taighe St Columbs Isle. This last name suggests that the chapel on Eilean an Taighe might have been dedicated to St Columba. The meaning of Nunaltins remains unclear but may derive from the Gaelic for Island of the Streams.

== Geography and geology ==
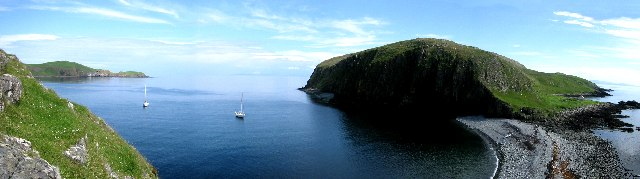
View from Garbh Eilean, with Eilean an Taighe on the right, and Eilean Mhuire in the distance. This photograph was taken through a "fisheye” (ultra-wide-angle) lens; it is not representative of what an observer on the ground would see.

The Shiant Islands lie east of the Sound of Shiant. Garbh Eilean and Eilean an Taighe together extend to 143 hectares (350 acres); the much more fertile Eilean Mhuire extends to 75 hectares (190 acres). In addition to these main islands, there is a line of Galtachan rocks that lie to the west: Galta Beag, Bodach, Staca Làidir, Galta Mòr, Sgeir Mhic a' Ghobha and Damhag.

Geologically, these islands are an extension of the Trotternish peninsula of Skye. Their rocks are volcanic, and, at 60 million years old, very young compared with other Hebridean rocks. Dolerite columns on the north side of Garbh Eilean are over 120 metres (390 feet) tall and about 2 m (6 ft 7 in) in diameter. They are much higher in places than those at Staffa and the Giant's Causeway, but similar in that they were formed by the slow cooling of volcanic rocks deep underground. Intrusive sills exhibit a progression in their chemical compositions, from olivine-rich rocks at the base, to rocks with very little or no olivine at the top.

The sills are thought to have been formed by crystal settling. Recent study has suggested that at least one of the sills is an example of a multiple intrusion. In some places, the basalt is overlain by Jurassic mudstone, which weathers to form much more fertile soil than is present elsewhere in the Western Isles.

The geological features of the Shiant Islands are one of the reasons they have been designated a Site of Special Scientific Interest by NatureScot. The other is the bird species present (see Wildlife below).

The islands can be visited by means of various cruise ships that operate from other Hebridean Islands and from mainland Scotland. Small boat (RIBs) tours out to the islands are also run by operators from the Outer Hebrides.

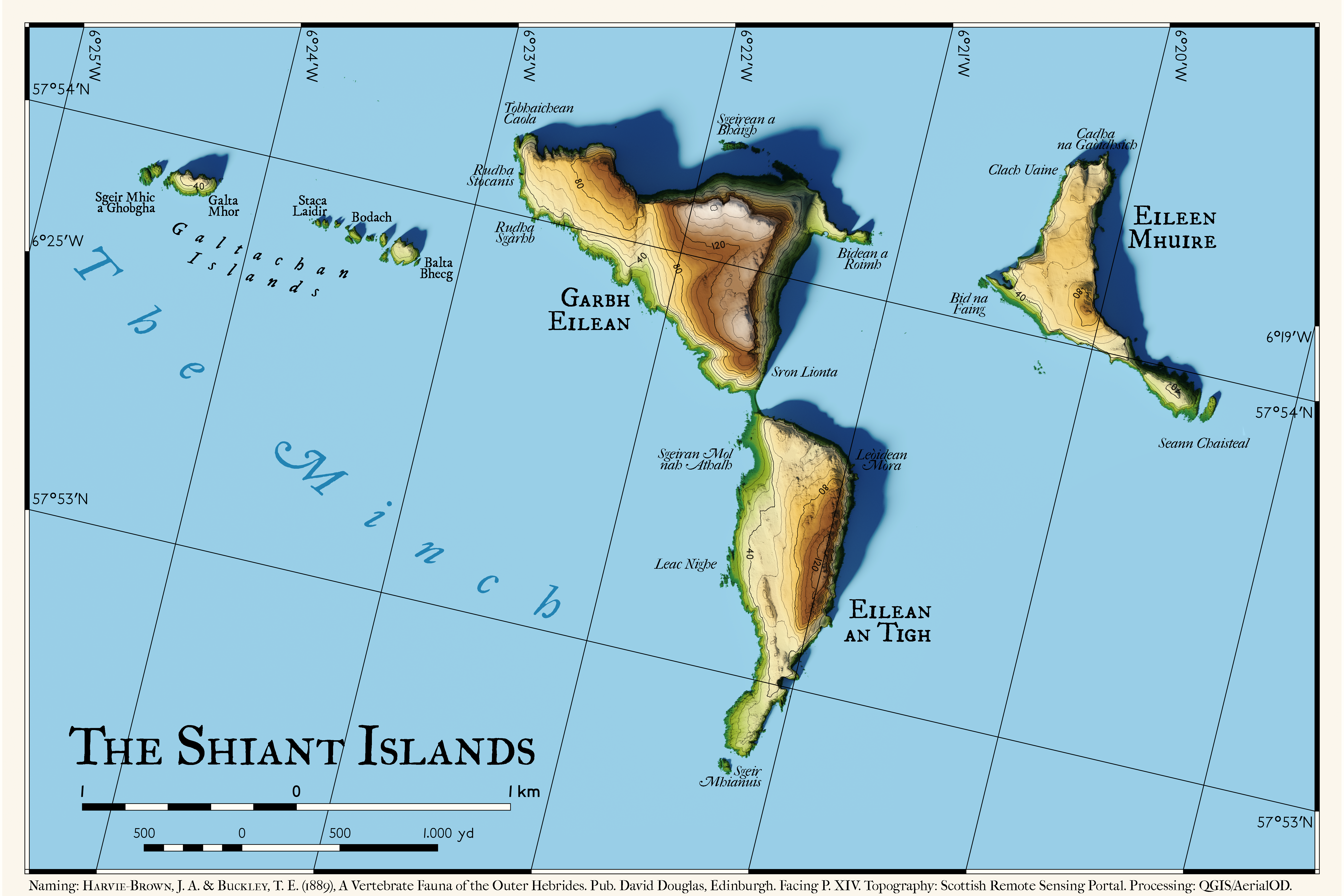
Map of the Shiant Isles

== History ==
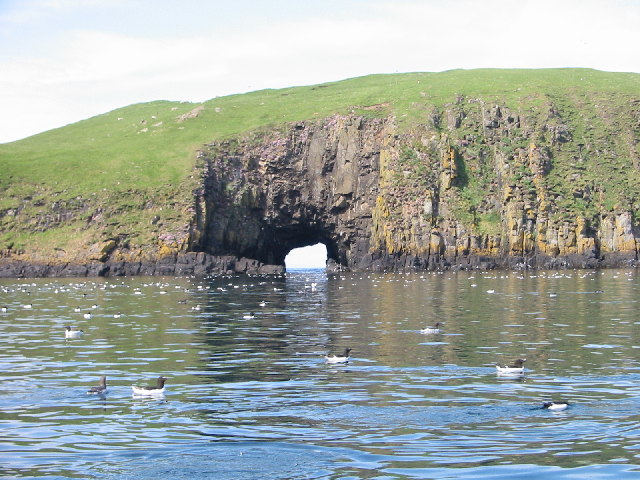
Sea cave of Toll a' Roimh on Garbh Eilean

In 1549, Donald Monro, Dean of the Isles wrote in Scots of:

"an isle called Ellan Senta, which means in English "fable island", an isle more than two miles [three kilometres] long, very profitable for grain, stock-rearing and fishing, pertaining to McLeod of Lewis. On the east side of this isle there is a bore, made like a vault, longer(?) than the arrow shot of any man on earth, through which gulping vault we used to row our sail boats, for fear of the horrible break of the seas that is on the outward side, but no large ship can sail through it." Nicolson (2002) calls this "vault" on Toll a' Roimh at the north east end of Garbh Eilean the "Hole of the Seals" and describes rowing a dinghy through it. (Note: Translation from Scots: "ane ile callit Ellan Senta, that is in English a Saw, ane ile mair than twa myle lang, verey profitable for corne, store, and fishing, perteining to M’Cloyd of the Lewis. On the eist side of this ile ther is a bore, maid like a vylt, mair nore an arrow shot of any man under the eirde, through the quilk vylt we use to row ore saill with our bottis, for fear of the horrible breake of the seas that is on the outward side thereof, bot na grate ships can saill ther." Nicolson (2002) calls this "vault" on Toll a' Roimh at the north east end of Garbh Eilean the "Hole of the Seals" and describes rowing a dinghy through it.)

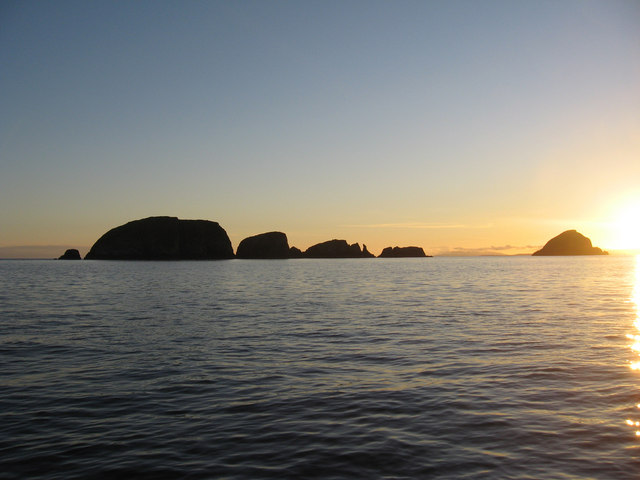
Galtachan sunset. From left to right: Galta Beag, unnamed islet, Bodach (with the stooping silhouette of the "old man") Staca Làidir and Galta Mòr.

A century and a half later, in 1703, Martin Martin wrote that

the two southern islands are separated only by spring-tides, and are two miles [3 km] in circumference. Island-More hath a chapel in it dedicated to the Virgin Mary, and is fruitful in corn and grass; the island joining to it on the west is only for pasturage. (Note: Martin's poor grasp of the geography contributed to later confusion. "Island-More" must be his translation of Na h-Eileanan Mòra and there was a chapel on Eilean an Taighe (known as Eilean na Cille at the time he was writing). The "island joining to it on the west" must therefore be Garbh Eilean to the north. Martin's description has led to suggestions that the chapel was on Eilean Mhuire, although this seems unlikely.)

At the beginning of the twentieth century, the Shiant Islands were home to only eight people. The author and politician Compton MacKenzie owned the islands from 1925 until 1937. He was an island lover who, at different points in his life, also occasionally rented Herm in the Channel Islands. He never lived on the Shiants, but paid several brief visits there during his time as owner.

In 1937, the islands were purchased by Nigel Nicolson, then an undergraduate at Oxford, using money that had been left to him by his grandmother. Nicolson later became a writer, publisher and politician, as MacKenzie had been. Nicolson's son, the writer Adam Nicolson, published the definitive book on the islands, Sea Room (2001). Today, the Shiants belong to Adam's son, Tom Nicolson. Sheep continue to graze the islands, as they have done since the mid-19th century. The simple cottage maintained by the Nicolson family on Eilean an Taighe is the only habitable structure on any of the islands. In 2012, Robert Macfarlane published, in The Old Ways, a description of his visit to the islands.

== Wildlife ==
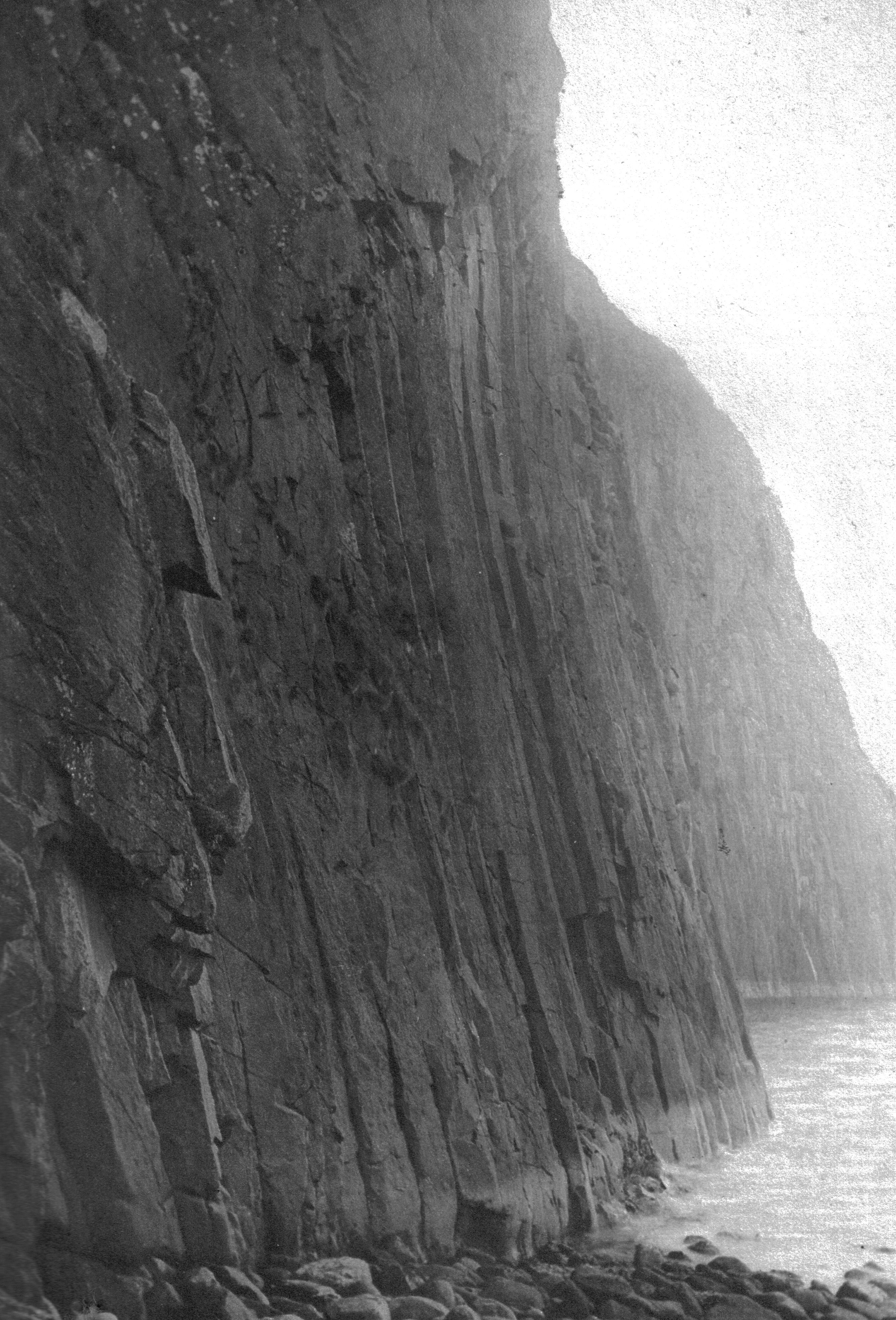
White-tailed eagle eyrie on the Shiant Islands in 1888.

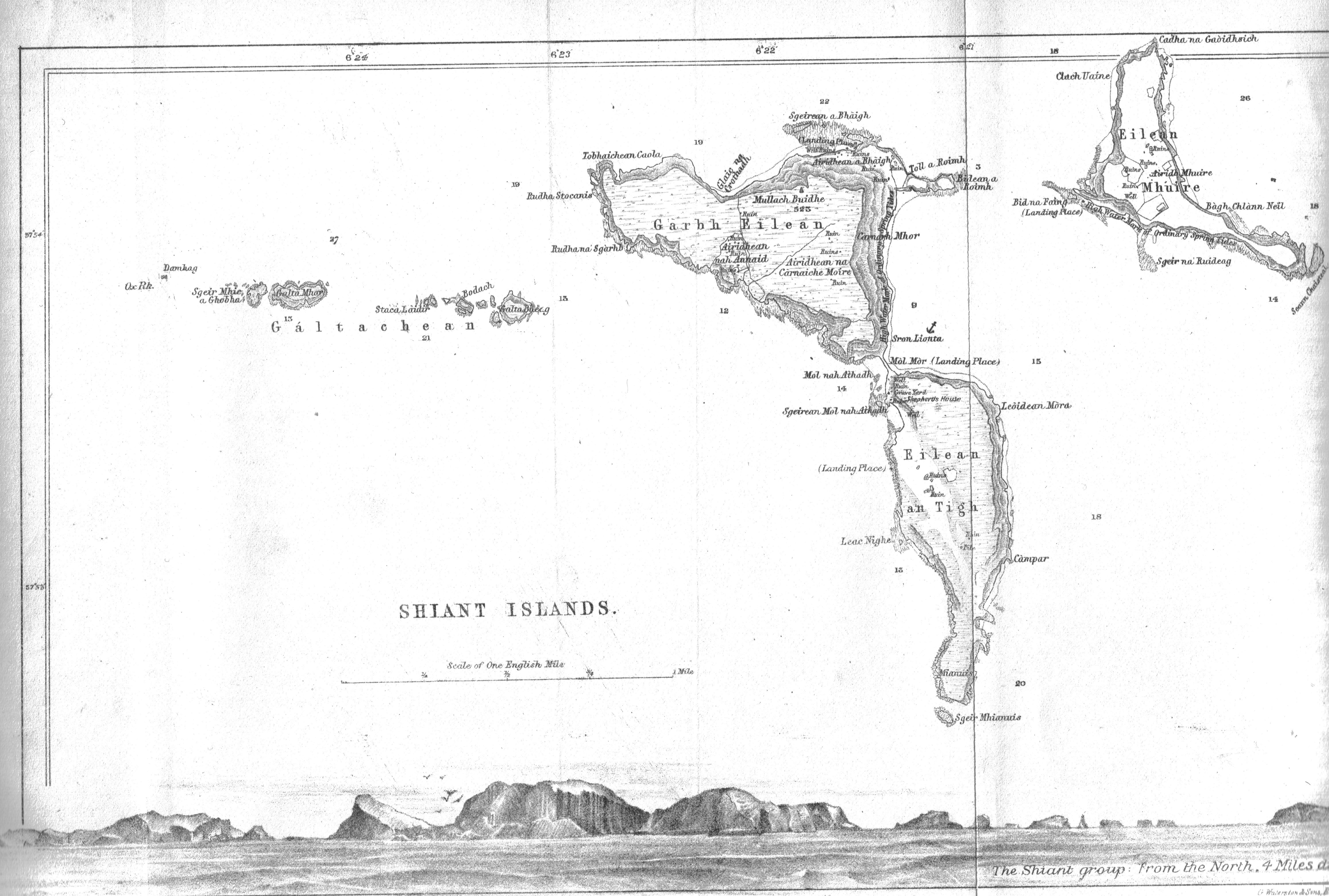
The Shiant Islands.

The Shiant Islands have a large population of seabirds, including tens of thousands of Atlantic puffins that breed in burrows on the slopes of Garbh Eilean, and significant numbers of common guillemots, razorbills, northern fulmars, black-legged kittiwakes, common shags, gulls and great skuas. (There are fewer puffins on Garbh Eilean than on the remote island of St Kilda, but they are much more densely congregated.) The presence of these seabirds have led to the Shiant Islands being designated a Special Protection Area by NatureScot.

Until recently, the islands were also home to a population of black rats, Rattus rattus, which are presumed to have originally come ashore from a shipwreck. Apart from one or two small islands in the Firth of Forth, the Shiants were the only place in the UK where the black rat (or ship rat) could still be found. There was thought to be a population of about 3,500 rats on the islands in wintertime, with their numbers rising exponentially during the summer. Analysis of their stomach contents had shown that they ate seabirds, but it could not be determined whether they preyed on live birds or simply scavenged dead ones. (Their numbers had for many years been well controlled in and around the house.)

During the winter of 2015–2016, Wildlife Management International Limited initiated a project to permanently eradicate rats from the Shiant Islands, as part of the Shiant Isles Seabird Recovery Project. The project was funded by contributions from the EU, the SNH, the RSPB and many individual donors. In March 2018, the Shiant Islands were deemed to have satisfactorily completed the internationally agreed two-year eradication period, and were officially declared rat-free.

The waters around the Shiant Islands are home to a variety of marine wildlife including grey and harbour seals, fin whales, killer whales, dolphins, basking sharks, porpoises.

== See also ==
- List of islands of Scotland
