= Rough Island =

Rough Island may refer to:

- Rough Island (Maryland) an island in Maryland, US
- Rough Island, Scotland
- Rough Island, County Down, a townland in County Down, Northern Ireland
- Rough Island, County Fermanagh, a townland in County Fermanagh, Northern Ireland
