= Mote of Mark =

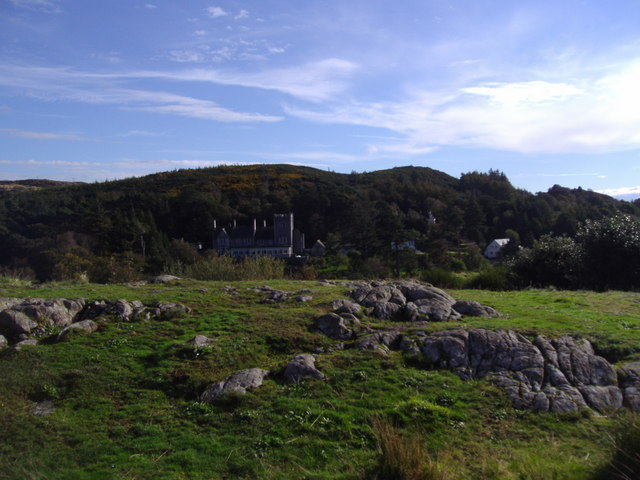
Top of the Mote of Mark

The Mote of Mark is a granite hill rising some 45 metres (148 ft) above the Rough Firth near the outlet of the Urr Water, near the village of Rockcliffe. It was the site of a vitrified fort during the Early Middle Ages, with about one third of an acre of the summit enclosed by a rampart of timber and stone. At the time of its occupation in the sixth and seventh centuries AD, the Mote lay within the kingdom of Rheged in the Celtic Old North.

The remains of a fort atop the Mote were first recognized by Robert Riddell in 1790. In 1913, the site was excavated by Alexander Curle, whose investigations were cut short by the onset of World War I the following year. Further excavations were undertaken in 1973 and 1979.

The remains of pottery and traces of metalworking (slag) indicate that the site was inhabited by the mid-sixth century AD, before the construction of the rampart. The rampart, which was constructed in a single phase, dates to the end of the sixth century. Imported ceramic and glass wares are a feature of the site throughout its period of habitation. Non-ferrous metalworking also continued within the rampart into the late seventh century. Around that time, the fort was burned down and the rampart slighted.

The Mote was a high status site. "Exotic" items, such as a wine amphora of eastern Mediterranean origin, have been found on the Mote. The workshop on the Mote produced high quality metal artefacts, such as roundels and belt buckles. The lord of the fort was probably the master blacksmith:

... there is no evidence at the Mote of Mark for royal status. The defences of the rock, on the other hand, are an indication of access to a labour source that could only be available to a lord of clients. There is some evidence, in the food resource and, indirectly in the use of exotic artefacts, particularly drinking glasses, for feasting at a level appropriate to a lord.

The scale of operations, on the summit of the hill at least, is small. The craft skills ... might be mechanisms by which the lord of the Mote of Mark acquired his status and the wealth to maintain it. The Mote of Mark, therefore, is likely to have been the workshop and home base of a master craftsman of high status.

As a lord, the master smith of the Mote of Mark, will have had clients or bondmen who owed him labour services and food gifts or renders. He will not have been entirely self-sufficient but will, almost certainly, have maintained his own farm in the vicinity of the stronghold on the rock.

No weapons or evidence of their manufacture have been found, but that the site experienced warfare "may be inferred from the burning and slighting of the ramparts." There is no surviving written record that illuminates this event. The bishop Wilfrid, active in the 670s, records how the Britons of Rheged fled before the Northumbrians. It is possible that the burning of the Mote should be associated with the collapse of Rheged and the advance of the Northumbrian frontier.

== Bibliography ==
- Laing, Lloyd; Longley, David; Bourdillon, Jennifer; Campbell, Ewan; Crew, Peter; La Niece, Susan; Page, Ray; Smith, George; Whitfield, Niamh (2006). The Mote of Mark: A Dark Age Hillfort in South-West Scotland. Oxbow Books. doi:10.2307/j.ctv2npq9jf.
