= Kippford =

Coordinates: 54°52′21″N 3°48′44″W

Kippford: Scots: The Scaur
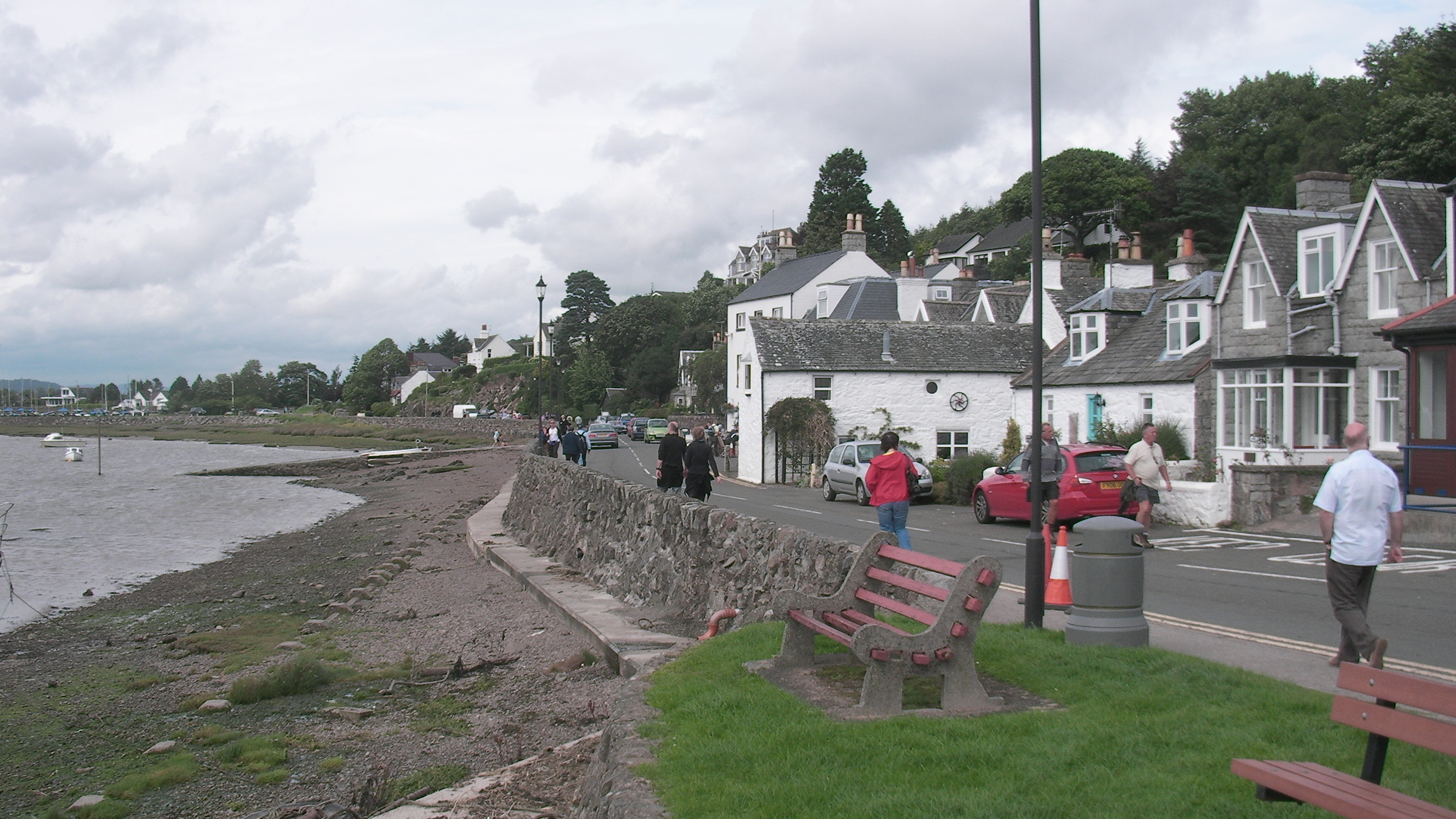
- Main road of Kippford

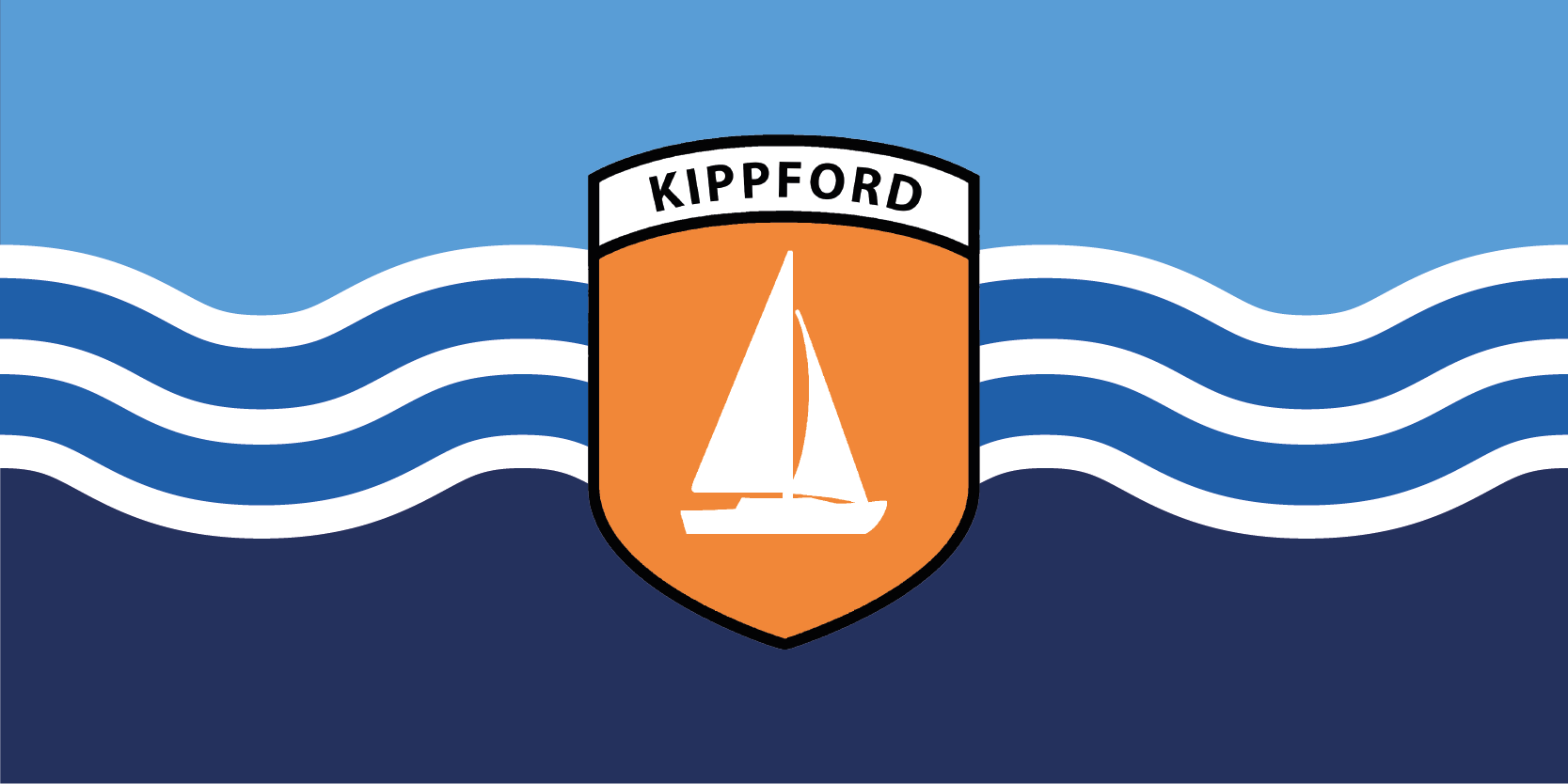
- Flag of Kippford

- Location within Dumfries and Galloway
- Population: 140 (2001 Census)
- OS grid reference: NX838546
- Council area: Dumfries and Galloway
- Lieutenancy area: Kirkcudbrightshire
- Country: Scotland
- Sovereign state: United Kingdom
- Post town: Dalbeattie
- Postcode district: DG5
- Dialling code: 01556
- Police: Scotland
- Fire: Scottish
- Ambulance: Scottish
- UK Parliament: Dumfries and Galloway
- Scottish Parliament: Galloway and West Dumfries

Kippford (/ˈkɪpfəd/; otherwise Scaur) is a small village along the Solway coast, in the historic county of Kirkcudbrightshire in Dumfries and Galloway, Scotland. Also known as the 'Solway Riviera', it has the most expensive property in Dumfries & Galloway.

== History ==
Between Kippford and Rockcliffe lies the Mote of Mark, a hill fort. Victorian Kippford had interests in the granite quarrying industry; the pier used now by the Solway Yacht Club being a former handling yard for a small railway line running into the hill to the East where a quarry was located.

== Geography ==
Kippford stretches along the banks of the Urr estuary and in places is only one house-wide, being hemmed in between the forested Mark hill (locally known as the Muckle) and the sea. Kippford can only be accessed by car by a 0.75 miles (1 km) road from Barnbarroch which passes by Craigieknowes Golf Course and two campsites.

Kippford is also linked to Rockcliffe, which is 1.25 miles (2 km) away, by a scenic track known as the Jubilee Path. The path passes parallel to the coast (and the village of Kippford) but at a higher elevation. The path can be used to access Mark hill and the Mote of Mark, a 5th-century hill fort.

Visitors may cross the sands to a small island called Rough Island when the tide allows.

Views from Kippford include the Cumbrian coast across the Solway Firth to the South. To the West can be seen Glen Isle and Screel in the background.

== Marine activities ==
Kippford is a popular sailing village, with many small yachts moored in the tidal estuary of the River Urr, and events organised by the Solway Yacht Club. The RNLI has maintained a station, now fitted with a D class lifeboat, in Kippford for the past 40 years. The lifeboat service share use of the village's public slipway. Kippford was also involved in the shipbuilding industry, albeit on a very small scale. Kippford is also known as the Solway Riviera and has the most expensive property in Dumfries & Galloway Region.
