= Gigging =

Practice of hunting fish or small game with a gig or similar multi-pronged spear

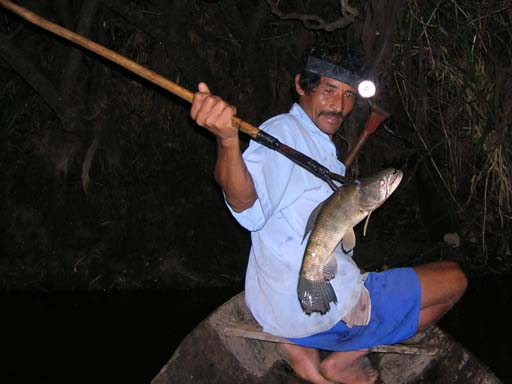
A successful gigger in the Amazon basin, Peru.

Gigging is the practice of hunting fish or small game with a gig or similar multi-pronged spear. Commonly harvested wildlife include freshwater suckers, saltwater flounder, and small game, such as frogs. A gig can refer to any long pole which has been tipped with a multi-pronged spear. The gig pole ranges in length from 8 to 14 ft (2.4 to 4.3 m) for fish gigs and 5 to 8 ft (1.5 to 2.4 m) for frog gigs. A gig typically has three or four barbed tines similar to a trident; however gigs can be made with any number of tines. In the past people would attach illuminated pine knots to the end of gigs at night to give them light.

== Sucker gigging ==
Suckers are a bottom-feeding fish common throughout many parts of the United States. The gigging of suckers for food occurs predominantly in southern Missouri and northern Arkansas, in the region referred to as the Ozarks. Sucker gigging is usually done at night with lights to maximize the visibility of the fast moving fish. Ozarks residents of the past often waded the clear local streams at night and gigged suckers while using light from hand-held lanterns. Modern sucker gigging uses specially constructed johnboats that have a set of lights mounted on the bow of the boat and a railing around the bow that allows the "gigger" to stand up and peer out in front of the boat in an attempt to locate and gig fish. The lighting system is often powered by gas, a generator, or a battery.

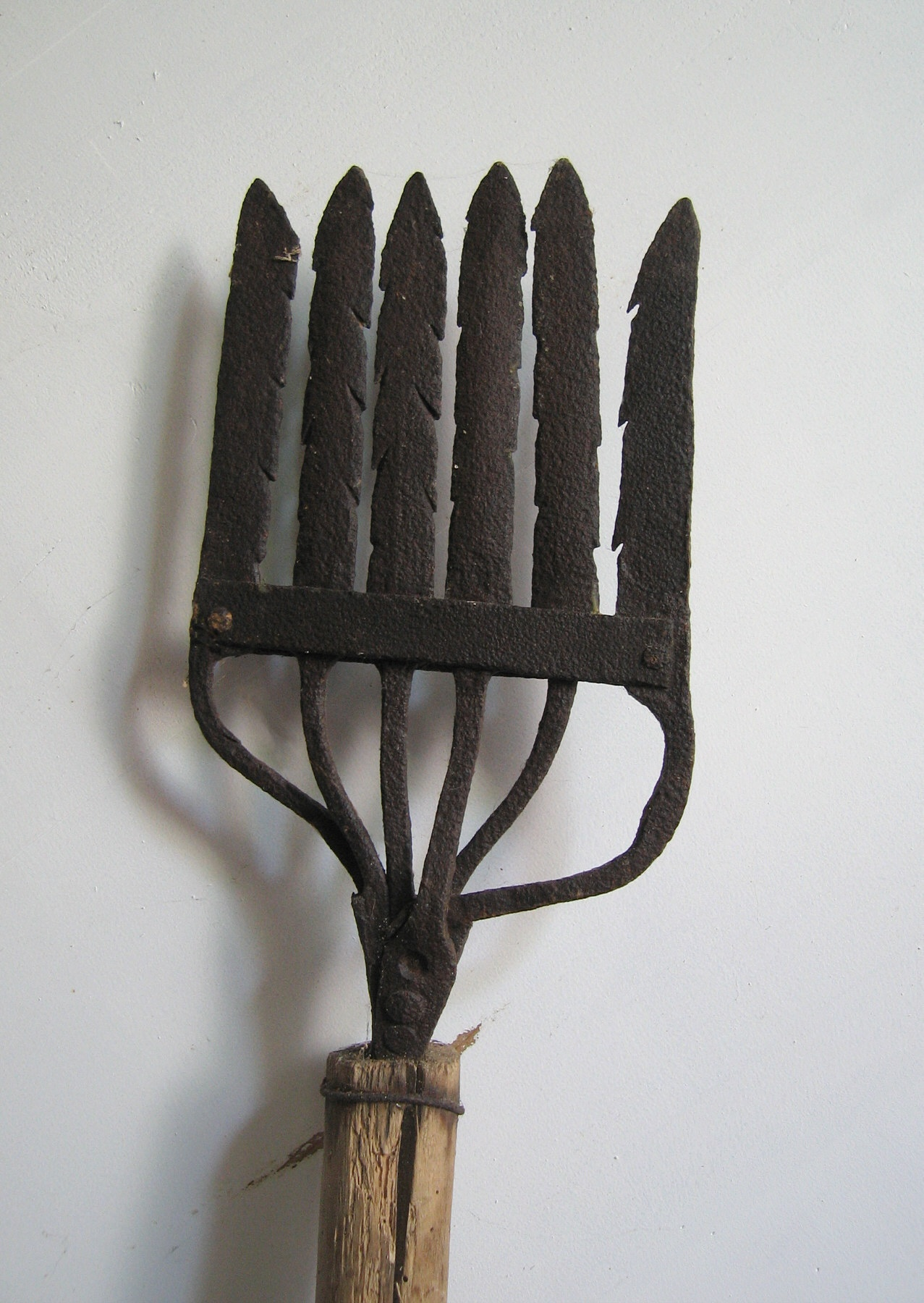
A fish gig

Species such as Catostomus commersonii and Hypentelium nigricans are commonly sought for eating. They can be canned or smoked, but are most commonly fried. Traditionally, small incisions are made in the flesh (termed "scoring") before frying to allow small internal bones to soften and become palatable.

== Flounder gigging ==
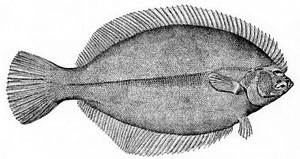
Winter flounder

Flounder or flatfish live in coastal saltwater areas, and lie at the bottom of the shallow waters waiting for shrimp or minnows to swim nearby. Flounder gigging can be done in daylight, but is often more successfully done at night using powerful lights. This method targets nocturnally foraging fish. The light is used to spot the normally camouflaged fish. Historically, hollow bamboo poles filled with coal were used for lighting, and more recently kerosene lamps. Modern lights usually use halogen or LED lamps. This method is effective in shallow, clear water where fish are easily observable from the top. The temporarily blind fish are speared with the gig, or sometimes can be collected by hand. During fishing events, an experienced person holds a lamp in the hand and points out fish for other people to collect.

Flounder gigging can be done by wading stealthily in shallow water, but it is usually done from a flounder boat. A flounder boat is specifically designed for gigging flounder. It typically has a flat, wide bottom to provide a stable platform and the ability to navigate shallow waters. Flounder vessels are navigated with a push-pole along the banks and flats where flounder may be lying. A battery powers light arrays for viewing the flat fish.

== Frog gigging ==
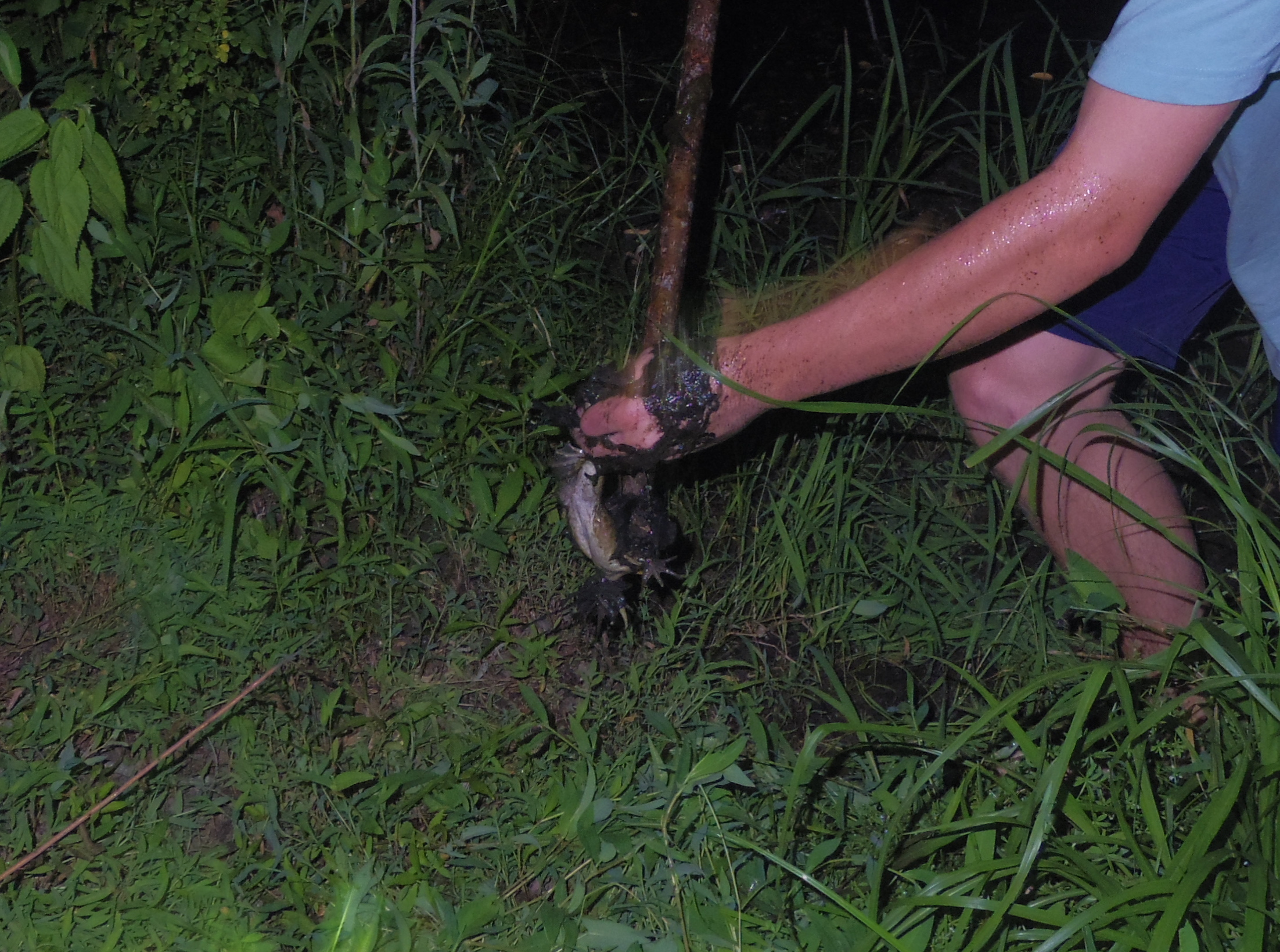
American bullfrog caught at night by a pond in the Southern United States on a simple homemade frog gig constructed out of wood and nails.

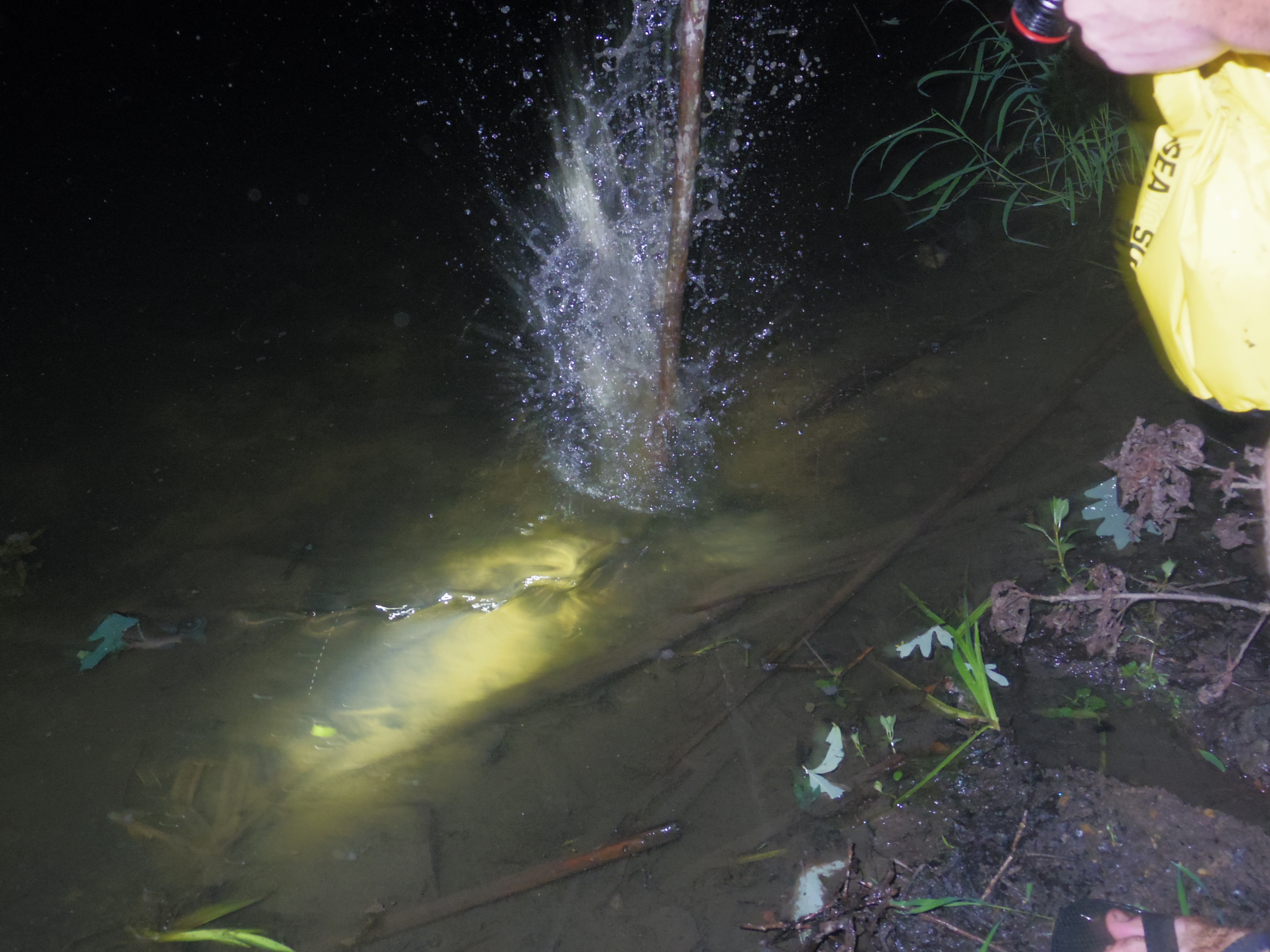
Frog gigging at night by a pond using a flashlight and a homemade frog gig.

Frog gigging is commonly done at night, but it can be done during the day as well. Traditionally, flashlights or spotlights are used to locate the frogs as their eyes reflect the light at night. In addition to help the locating of frogs, shining a light in their eyes stuns or dazes the frogs, and makes it less likely for the frog to see an approaching hunter, or the incoming gig itself. A four or five-tined gig is often preferred for frog gigging, as they are normally wider giving the frog gigger more room for error when thrusting the gig at a frog. Frog gigs however, traditionally have smaller tines and are generally smaller overall than gigs used for fish. A fishing license is required in most states and jurisdictions. Frog gigging regulations are usually found in each state's hunting and fishing regulations.

Frogs are often sought for the meat of their hind legs. Frog legs are often cooked deep fried or sautéed. In proportion, the hind legs can contain as much meat as the legs of a medium-sized chicken. Traditionally they are breaded with a mixture of egg and bread or cracker crumbs. Frog legs are cleaned, breaded with flour and boiled in melted butter. This dish is served immediately with garlic-parsley sauce.

Although capturing frogs with a net or clasp pole may be referred to as frog gigging by some, this is incorrect, as a gig is not being used. Handling frogs with the objective of releasing them may harm the creature because some chemicals present on human skin can easily be absorbed by the frog's skin.

The practice of gigging frogs has been famously referenced in college football. Texas A&M University uses the cry “Gig ‘em Aggies” which debuted as a rally cry against Texas Christian University (whose mascot is the Horned Frogs), and the phrase has stuck to all of Texas A&M sports and beyond.

== Other fish ==
Gigging may also be used to harvest a variety of non-game fish species in numerous states. In Oklahoma, the gamefish white bass may also be taken by gig.

== See also ==
- Flounder tramping
- Spearfishing
