= Rough Island, Scotland =

Tidal island in the Rough Firth off the Solway Firth in Scotland

Coordinates: 54.86017°N 3.80401°W

Rough Island
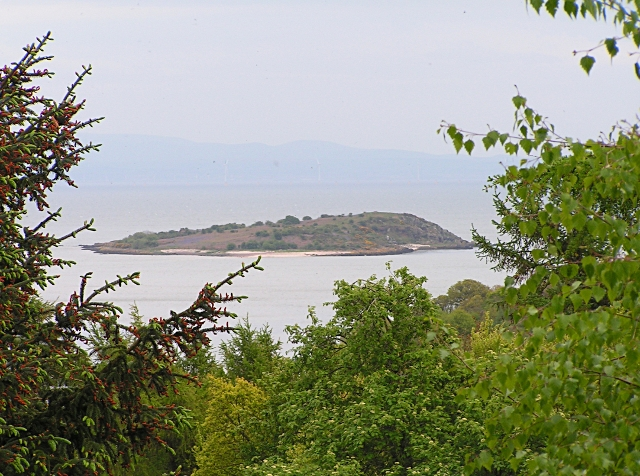
- Rough Island, opposite Rockcliffe

Location
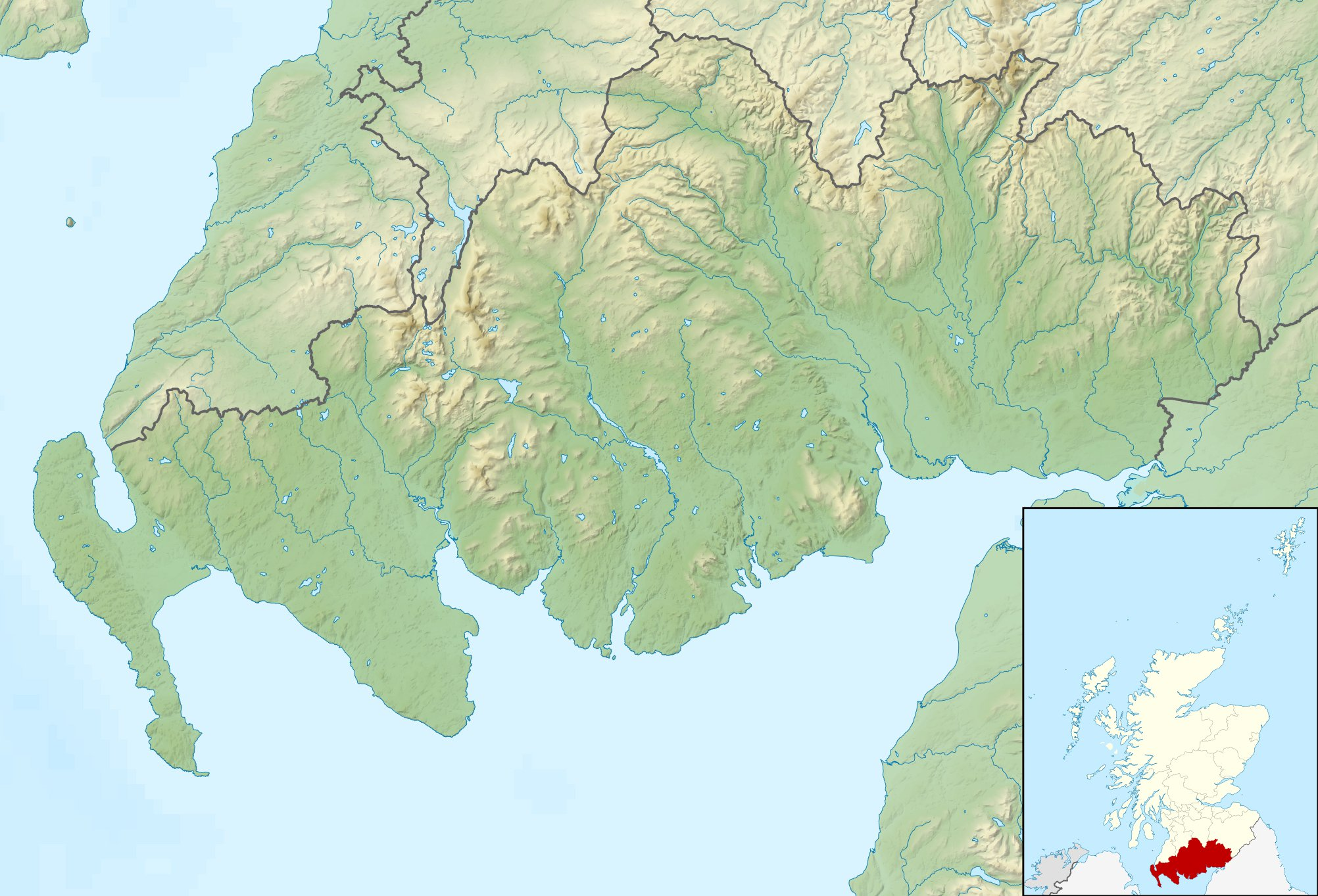
- Rough Island shown within Dumfries and Galloway

Physical geography
- Area: 8 hectares (0.03 sq mi)

Administration
- Council area: Dumfries and Galloway
- Country: Scotland
- Sovereign state: United Kingdom

Demographics
- Population: 0

"Rough Island" is also used as a translation of "Garbh Eilean", a common Scottish name for islands

Rough Island is a 20-acre (8 ha) uninhabited tidal island located in the Rough Firth off the Solway Firth, Scotland, in the historical county of Kirkcudbrightshire, the same region where the River Urr flows into the Solway. The isle of Rough is 79 feet (24 metres) at its highest point.

== Accessibility ==
Accessible across the causeway from Kippford when the tides allow or across the mudflats from Rockcliffe, the isle of Rough can be walked to from the Scottish mainland. As the island is a bird sanctuary visitors should avoid travelling to the island during the months of May and June to avoid disturbing the nesting oystercatchers and ringed plovers. The islands' causeway is flooded and underwater for 5 (five) hours during high tide and visitors to the island need to take this into account when travelling there.

== See also ==
- List of outlying islands of Scotland
