= Eilean an Taighe =

Island of the Shiant Islands, Outer Hebrides, Scotland

Coordinates: 57°53′24″N 6°21′14″W

"Eilean an Taighe", or "Eilean Taigh" is a fairly common island name

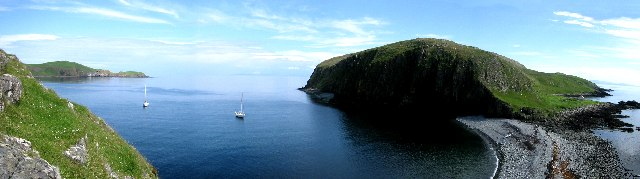
looking from Eilean Garbh to Eilean an Taighe on the right and Eilean Mhuire in the distance.

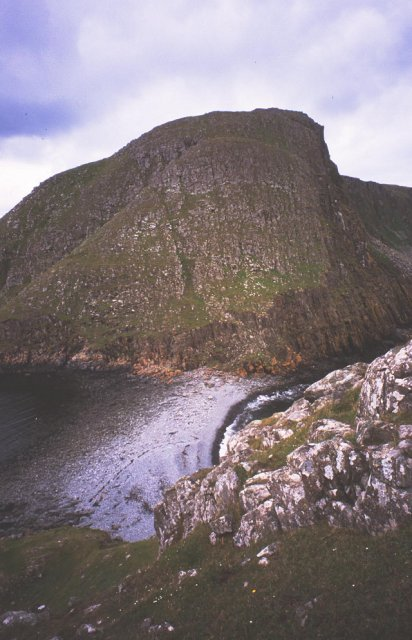
Beach between the two main islands of the Shiants (Garbh Eilean and Eilean an Taighe)

Eilean an T(a)ighe, meaning "House Island" (lit. "Island of the House"), is one of the Shiant Islands. It is joined to Garbh Eilean by an isthmus, so they each form part of what is actually a single island.

== History ==
Before the 1820s, the island was called Eilean na Cille ("church island"), and there is evidence of a church, possibly dedicated to the Virgin Mary, near the site of the present cottage. Eilean Mhuire, one of the other islands in the Shiants, also takes its name from Mary.

In the mid-18th century, 40 people were living there, but by 1770 they had all left. In the 1820s a shepherd and his wife were resident, but, by 1842, they too had gone. From 1862 to 1901, another shepherd, Donald Campbell, and his wife and two daughters lived there. The daughters, Mòr and Catriona, were apparently very beautiful, and attracted the attention of visiting fishermen and yachtsmen alike.

In 1937, the islands were acquired by Nigel Nicolson, then an undergraduate at Oxford, who — like the former owner, Compton MacKenzie, was later a writer, publisher and politician. Nicolson's son, the writer Adam Nicolson, published the definitive book on the islands, Sea Room. The Shiants now belong to Adam's son, Tom. Sheep belonging to a Lewis crofter graze all three islands. The simple bothy restored by Nigel Nicolson on Eilean an Taighe is currently the only habitable structure on the islands.

== Bibliography ==
- Haswell-Smith, Hamish (2004). The Scottish Islands. Edinburgh: Canongate. ISBN 978-1-84195-454-7.
- Nicolson, Adam (2001). Sea Room: an island life. HarperCollins. ISBN 0-00-257164-1.
