= List of listed buildings in Urr, Dumfries and Galloway =

This is a list of listed buildings in the civil parish of Urr in Dumfries and Galloway, Scotland.

== List ==
Name	Location	Date Listed	Grid Ref. (Note: Sometimes known as OSGB36, the grid reference (where provided) is based on the British national grid reference system used by the Ordnance Survey. • "Guide to National Grid". Ordnance Survey. • "Get-a-map". Ordnance Survey.)	Geo-coordinates	Notes	LB Number (Note: Historic Environment Scotland assign a unique alphanumeric identifier to each designated site in Scotland, for listed buildings this always begins with "LB", for example "LB12345".)	Image
Crocketford, The Galloway Arms				55°02′10″N 3°49′47″W	Category B	16805	Upload Photo
Larganlee Martyrs Monument And Tomb				55°03′21″N 3°51′52″W	Category C(S)	16808	Upload Photo
Meikle Kirkland				55°00′33″N 3°50′38″W	Category B	16811	Upload Photo
Hardgate, Mckies Cottage And Byre Cottage				54°59′03″N 3°51′10″W	Category C(S)	16814	Upload Photo
Spottes Walled Garden And Stableyard				54°58′38″N 3°52′04″W	Category B	16818	Upload Photo
Chapelton Steading And Old Grain Barn				54°58′51″N 3°52′44″W	Category B	16802	Upload Photo
Crocketford, Anvil House (Former Smithy)				55°02′09″N 3°49′44″W	Category C(S)	16803	Upload Photo
Spottes Hall				54°58′35″N 3°52′07″W	Category B	16817	Upload Photo
Bridgend Of Spottes				54°58′28″N 3°52′03″W	Category C(S)	16801	Upload Photo
Crocketford, The Galloway Arms Annexe				55°02′10″N 3°49′47″W	Category B	16812	Upload Photo
Edingham Castle				54°56′43″N 3°48′48″W	Category B	16813	Upload Photo
Newbank Mill House, Former Spinning Mill, Dyeing And Weaving Sheds And Weavers Cottages				55°00′17″N 3°52′10″W	Category B	16815	Upload Photo
Urr Parish Church (Church Of Scotland) Churchyard With Retaining Walls And Gates				54°58′22″N 3°51′00″W	Category B	16819	Upload Photo
Meikle Culloch Horsemill And Adjoining Barn				54°57′30″N 3°48′52″W	Category B	16809	Upload Photo
Haugh Bridge, Bridge Over Urr Water, Near Haugh Of Urr				54°58′27″N 3°52′04″W	Category A	16807	Upload Photo
Haugh Of Urr, Signpost At Junction Of B794 And U96				54°58′31″N 3°51′29″W	Category B	50003	Upload Photo
Crocketford, Ashmount				55°02′09″N 3°49′43″W	Category C(S)	16804	Upload Photo
Meikle Dalbeattie Farmhouse Near Dalbeattie				54°56′04″N 3°50′08″W	Category C(S)	16810	Upload Photo
Spottes Bridge, Bridge Over Spottes Burn On Old Military Road				54°58′30″N 3°52′01″W	Category C(S)	16816	Upload Photo
Hardgate, Westwood Cottage, Near Haugh Of Urr				54°59′00″N 3°51′14″W	Category C(S)	16806	Upload Photo

== Key ==
The scheme for classifying buildings in Scotland is:

- Category A: "buildings of national or international importance, either architectural or historic; or fine, little-altered examples of some particular period, style or building type."
- Category B: "buildings of regional or more than local importance; or major examples of some particular period, style or building type, which may have been altered."
- Category C: "buildings of local importance; lesser examples of any period, style, or building type, as originally constructed or moderately altered; and simple traditional buildings which group well with other listed buildings."

In March 2016 there were 47,288 listed buildings in Scotland. Of these, 8% were Category A, and 50% were Category B, with the remaining 42% being Category C.
