= Garbh Eilean =

This is a list of islands in Scotland with the name Garbh Eilean or similar, meaning "rough island" in Scottish Gaelic.

The largest of these islands are:

- Garbh Eilean, Shiant Islands
- Garbh Eilean, Loch Maree, in Loch Maree

== Smaller islands ==
=== Garbh Eilean ===
- Garbh Eilean NB125325 in Loch Ròg, Lewis
- Garbh Eilean NB365215 in Loch Erisort, Lewis
- Garbh Eilean, Kylesku NC225335 - crossed by the Kylesku bridge
- Garbh Eilean NG615535 in Coal Rona, south of Rona
- Garbh Eilean NH265025 in Loch Garry
- Garbh Eilean NM385375 between Ulva and Little Colonsay
- Garbh Eilean NM405185 near Uisken, Mull
- Garbh Eilean NM745615 in Loch Sunart
- Garbh Eilean Mòr NF885555 between Ronay and Grimsay in the Outer Hebrides
- Gairbh Eilein, NG239494 Loch Dunvegan

=== Eilean Garbh ===
- Eilean Garbh NC725475 in Strathnaver
- Eilean Garbh NR655545 off Gigha
- Eilean Garbh NC145405 in Badcall Bay, Sutherland
- Eilean Garbh NG605565 west of South Rona
- Eilean Garbh NM445405 in Laggan Bay, between Ulva and Mull

=== An Garbh-eilean ===
- An Garbh-eilean NG805375 in Loch Kishorn
- An Garbh-eilean NM675835 in Loch nan Uamh, Sound of Arisaig
- Garvie Island (An Garbh-eilean) NC332734 east of Cape Wrath

== Innis Garbh/Garbh Innis ==
- Inchgarvie, Firth of Forth, an anglicisation of this term.

== Similar names ==
- Garbh Eileach, an island in the Inner Hebrides of the west coast of Scotland
- Garvellachs, a small archipelago in the Inner Hebrides of Scotland
- Garbh Sgeir, a rock near the islet Òigh-sgeir, in the Small Isles, Lochaber

== See also ==
- Rough Island in the Solway Firth
- List of islands in Scotland
