= Orchardton Tower =

Tower house in Scotland

- Near Palnackie, Dumfries and Galloway, Scotland; GB grid reference NX817551
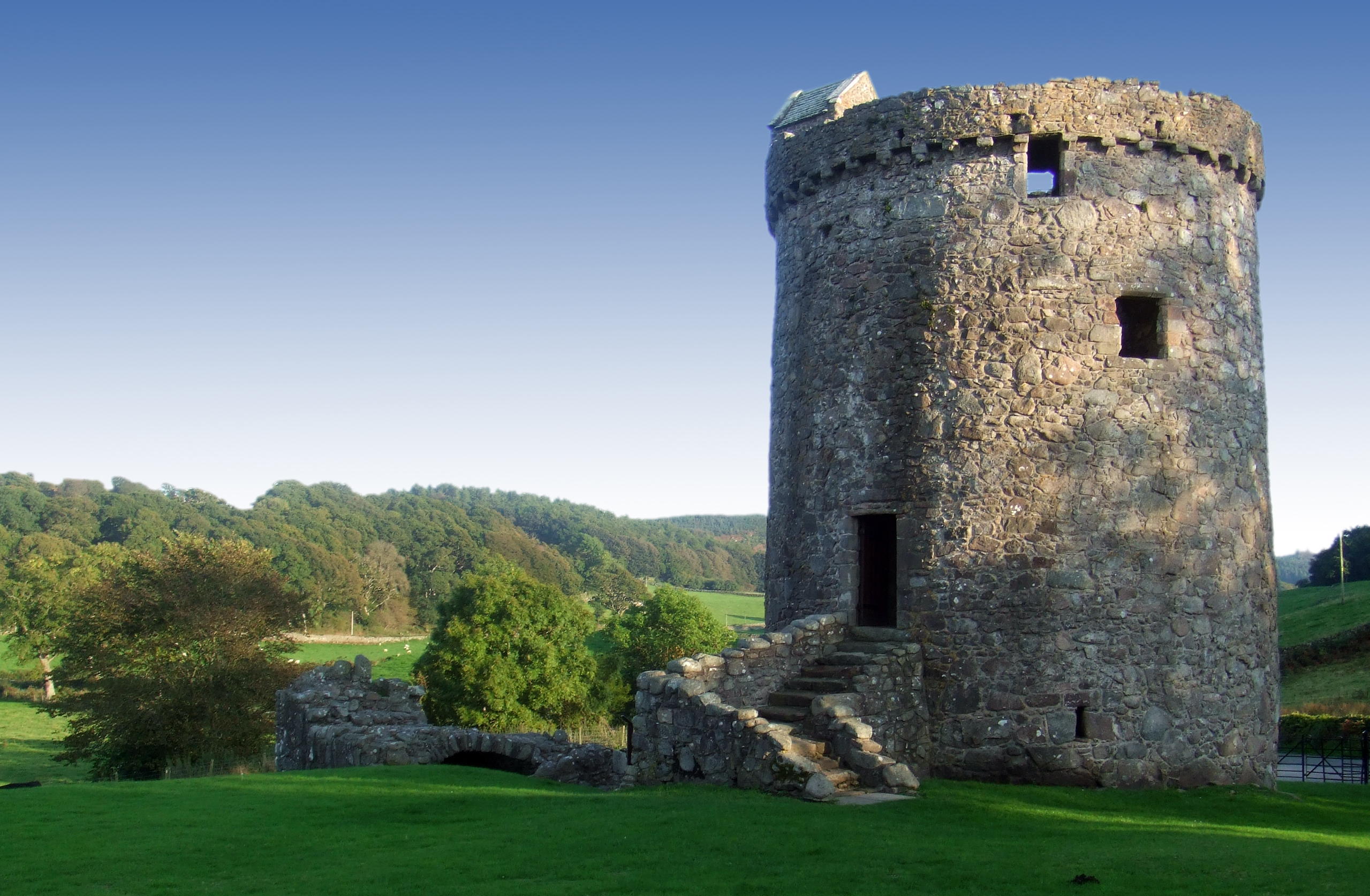
- Orchardton Tower viewed from the south-east

Site information
- Type: Tower house

Location
- Location within Dumfries and Galloway
- Coordinates: 54.876389°N 3.843889°W

Site history
- Built: Later 15th century
- Built by: John Cairns

Orchardton Tower is a ruined tower house in Kirkcudbrightshire, Dumfries and Galloway, Scotland. It is located four miles (six kilometres) south of Dalbeattie, and one mile (two kilometres) south of Palnackie, in Buittle parish. It is remarkable as it's the only cylindrical tower house in Scotland. Orchardton Tower is in the care of Historic Environment Scotland as a Scheduled Ancient Monument.

== History ==
The Cairns family, who built Orchardton, were associated with the area from the early 15th century. Alexander Cairns was Provost of Lincluden Collegiate Church until his death in 1422. His brother, John Cairns, was Custumar, or customs officer, in Linlithgow. John Cairns was also a military engineer, and was responsible for designing the impressive King David's Tower at Edinburgh Castle, which was destroyed in 1573. His heir, another John Cairns who was his nephew's son, was granted the lands of 'Irisbuitle', or Orchardton, in 1456. The grant of former Douglas lands was possibly in return for Cairns' support for James II, in his successful struggle to overthrow the power of the 'Black' Earls of Douglas. John Cairns built Orchardton Tower soon after. Circular towers such as this were common during the thirteenth century, but had largely been replaced by square and rectangular tower houses by the 1400s: Orchardton Tower is thus unique in being built around 200 years after such towers had gone out of fashion. The fact that round towers are common in Ireland has led to speculation of Irish influence at Orchardton, however no specific link has been found.

John Cairns' grandson William was present, in support of his relatives Agnew and Lochinvar, at the murder of Thomas McLellan of Bombie, outside St. Giles' Cathedral, Edinburgh in 1527. On William's death in 1558 the estate was partitioned between his three daughters. One heiress, Margaret Cairns, Lady Orchardton, after marrying Edward Maxwell became involved in a feud between the Maxwells and the Johnstons, and in 1591 went to stay with her son Alexander Kirkpatrick. He tried to secure her income and imprisoned her in a chamber at Kirkmichael. The part of Orchardton including the castle was sold in 1616 to Robert Maxwell, who had earlier bought the other portions of the estate. Maxwell was a nephew of Lord Maxwell, and in 1663 was created a baronet.

Maxwell's descendants were divided along with the rest of the country during the Reformation. Mungo Maxwell (b. 1700) was illegally disinherited by his half brothers on religious grounds. His son, another Robert Maxwell, was raised in France, and obtained a commission in the French Army. Following service in France, he took part in the Jacobite rising of 1745. He was wounded at Culloden and taken prisoner, where his commission was discovered and he was consequently spared execution; as a foreign soldier, he was treated as a prisoner of war rather than a traitor.

Robert returned to France for a time, before deciding to declare himself a Protestant in order to claim his rightful inheritance. In 1753 he resigned his commission and returned to Scotland to begin a long lawsuit, which ended in 1771 when he was confirmed as Sir Robert Maxwell, 7th Bt. These events were used as inspiration by Sir Walter Scott, for his novel Guy Mannering.

Using stones from the original castle that adjoined Orchardton Tower, Robert Maxwell completed construction of a new, more comfortable manor house (now called Orchardton Castle) a few miles away. He was bankrupted by his financial dealings, and in 1785 the estate was sold to the Douglas family. It is unlikely that the castle was lived in after this time.

== The tower ==
The round tower was located at the north east corner of a fortified yard or barmkin, which would have sheltered livestock and provided cellars, a bakehouse, and probably a hall built on an upper level. The tower itself was reserved for living quarters, and was accessed via a stair, possibly moveable, from the barmkin up to a first floor doorway. The present entrance, on the north of the tower, was constructed in the 17th or 18th century. A new door was formed from an existing window and a permanent stone stair constructed.

The tower is 11m, in height, and around 9m in diameter, tapering slightly to the top. A corbelled parapet forms the top of the walls, with a gabled caphouse covering the spiral stair, which is within the 1.8m thick wall. Inside, a vaulted cellar occupies the ground floor. Above this was a main room with fireplace, deep windows with seats, and a carved lavabo or piscina. Above this would have been two further rooms, although the wooden floors have collapsed.
