= Palnackie =

Coordinates: 54.892145°N 3.840896°W

Palnackie (Pal - nack- ee): Scottish Gaelic: Poll an Achaidh
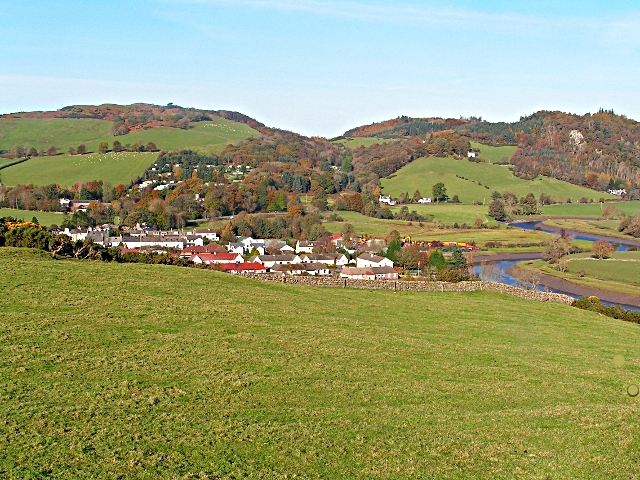

- Location within Dumfries and Galloway
- Population: 148 (2001 Census)
- OS grid reference: NX8188857193
- Council area: Dumfries and Galloway
- Lieutenancy area: Kirkcudbrightshire
- Country: Scotland
- Sovereign state: United Kingdom
- Post town: Castle Douglas
- Postcode district: DG7
- Dialling code: 01556
- Police: Scotland
- Fire: Scottish
- Ambulance: Scottish
- UK Parliament: Dumfries and Galloway; Dumfriesshire, Clydesdale and Tweeddale
- Scottish Parliament: Galloway and Upper Nithsdale

Palnackie is a village in the parish of Buittle in the historical county of Kirkcudbrightshire in Dumfries and Galloway, Scotland. It has a population of approximately 250 and is a working port on the Urr Water.

Palnackie is home to the Grande Internationale World Flounder Tramping Championships.
