= Rockcliffe, Dumfries and Galloway =

Coordinates: 54.865°N 3.796°W

Rockcliffe
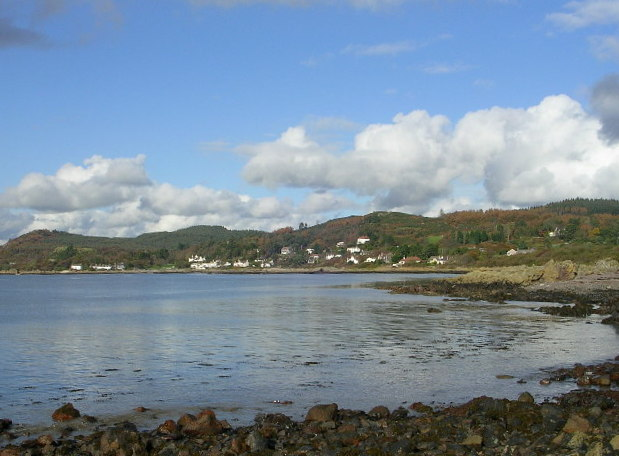
- Looking across the Rough Firth to Rockcliffe

- Location within Dumfries and Galloway
- Population: 137 (2001 census)
- OS grid reference: NX837546
- Council area: Dumfries and Galloway
- Lieutenancy area: Kirkcudbrightshire
- Country: Scotland
- Sovereign state: United Kingdom
- Post town: Dalbeattie
- Postcode district: DG5
- Dialling code: 01556 630
- Police: Scotland
- Fire: Scottish
- Ambulance: Scottish
- UK Parliament: Dumfries and Galloway; Dumfriesshire, Clydesdale and Tweeddale
- Scottish Parliament: Galloway and Upper Nithsdale

Rockcliffe is a small, coastal village in Kirkcudbrightshire, Dumfries and Galloway in Scotland, with a view of Rough Island, Hestan Island, the Solway Firth and sometimes the Cumbrian coast.

Rockcliffe lies on the eastern side of the River Urr estuary and gives access to Rough Island by way of both firm mud exposed at low tide and a natural, tidal causeway.

Road access is from Dalbeattie (six miles or ten kilometres) and Dumfries (twenty miles or thirty kilometres); although Kippford is nearby, there is no direct road route.

Rockcliffe is also linked to Castlehill Point (site of an Iron Age defended settlement), Glenstocken, Portling, and Sandyhills by footpath.

The village is a combination of both residential and holiday let properties. Local business in Rockcliffe is mainly holiday lets, though the village also has one tea room, a caravan site, and the surrounding farming industry. Salmon fishing with nets at Rough Island and cockle fishing are both occasionally based on the beach.

The village has a car park and a public toilet, now including a defibrillator, but no other facilities to speak of. An ice cream van can usually be relied upon to be open for business in the bay on even the cloudiest days.

The site of the 5th century Dark Ages hillfort called the Mote of Mark adjoins Rockcliffe. Furthermore, this site is an example of a vitrified fort.

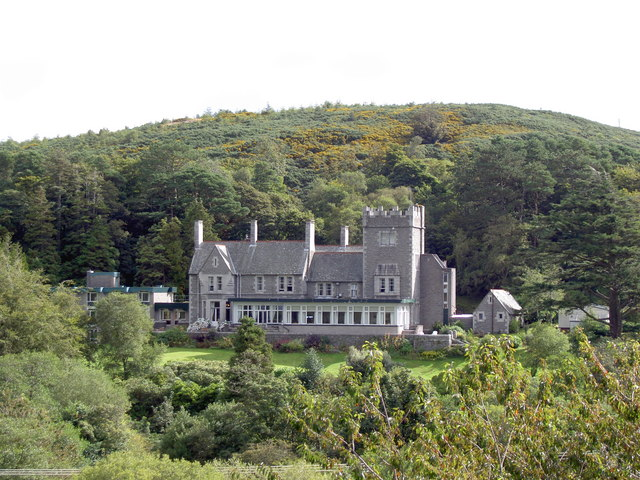
Baron's Craig

Baron's Craig is a Victorian country house designed by Alfred Waterhouse in 1879. It was in use for much of the 20th century as an hotel and known as the Baron's Craig Hotel. Hotel extensions were added by architects Sutherland, Dickie and Copland in the early 1970s. The Rockliffe Gallery occupies part of the building and organises a series of annual exhibitions.

Small parts of Rockcliffe were bequeathed to the National Trust for Scotland in the 1930s.
