= Haugh of Urr =

Coordinates: 54.978°N 3.868°W

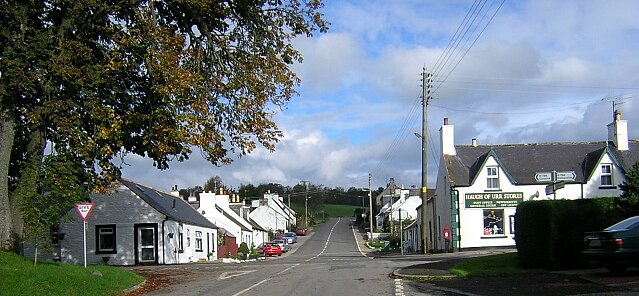

- Location within Dumfries and Galloway
- OS grid reference: NX8066
- Council area: Dumfries and Galloway
- Lieutenancy area: Kirkcudbrightshire
- Country: Scotland
- Sovereign state: United Kingdom
- Post town: Castle Douglas
- Postcode district: DG7
- Dialling code: 01556
- Police: Scotland
- Fire: Scottish
- Ambulance: Scottish
- UK Parliament: Dumfries and Galloway
- Scottish Parliament: Galloway and West Dumfries

Haugh of Urr (/hɒx ... ɜːr/), is a village in the historical county of Kirkcudbrightshire in Dumfries and Galloway, Scotland. It is approximately 4 miles (6 kilometres) NNW of Dalbeattie, 3 mi (5 km) NE of Castle Douglas, 12 1/2 mi (20 km) west of Dumfries and 12 1/2 mi (20 km) east of Kirkcudbright.

== Description ==
The village is situated beside the River Urr. Scots haugh (also hauch, haw, halch) means 'river-meadow', i.e. a level piece of ground beside a stream, from Old English halh, healh 'corner, nook'. Urr is from Cumbric or 'border, boundary, limit'.

It has one public house, the Laurie Arms (which incorporates a part-time post office), one church (Church of Scotland), a village hall, a Scout hut, and a small village green. The village no longer has any shops. It used to have two shops, one of which included a petrol filling station, while the other included a full-time post office, which reduced to part-time in later years. The last shop closed in 2009. Hardgate is a nearby hamlet up the hill and the boundaries are indistinct. Agriculture and tourism are the mainstays of the local economy. The village is known to locals as "the Haugh". Urrbrae, a suburb of South Australia's capital Adelaide, was named after the village.

== River Urr ==
The River Urr is noted for salmon fishing. The river, also known as Urr Water originates at Loch Urr and flows for 35 mi (56 km) southwards past Corsock, Glenlair, Auchendolly, Bridge of Urr, Haugh of Urr, and close to Dalbeattie, via Palnackie to the Solway Firth at Rough Firth.

== Motte of Urr ==
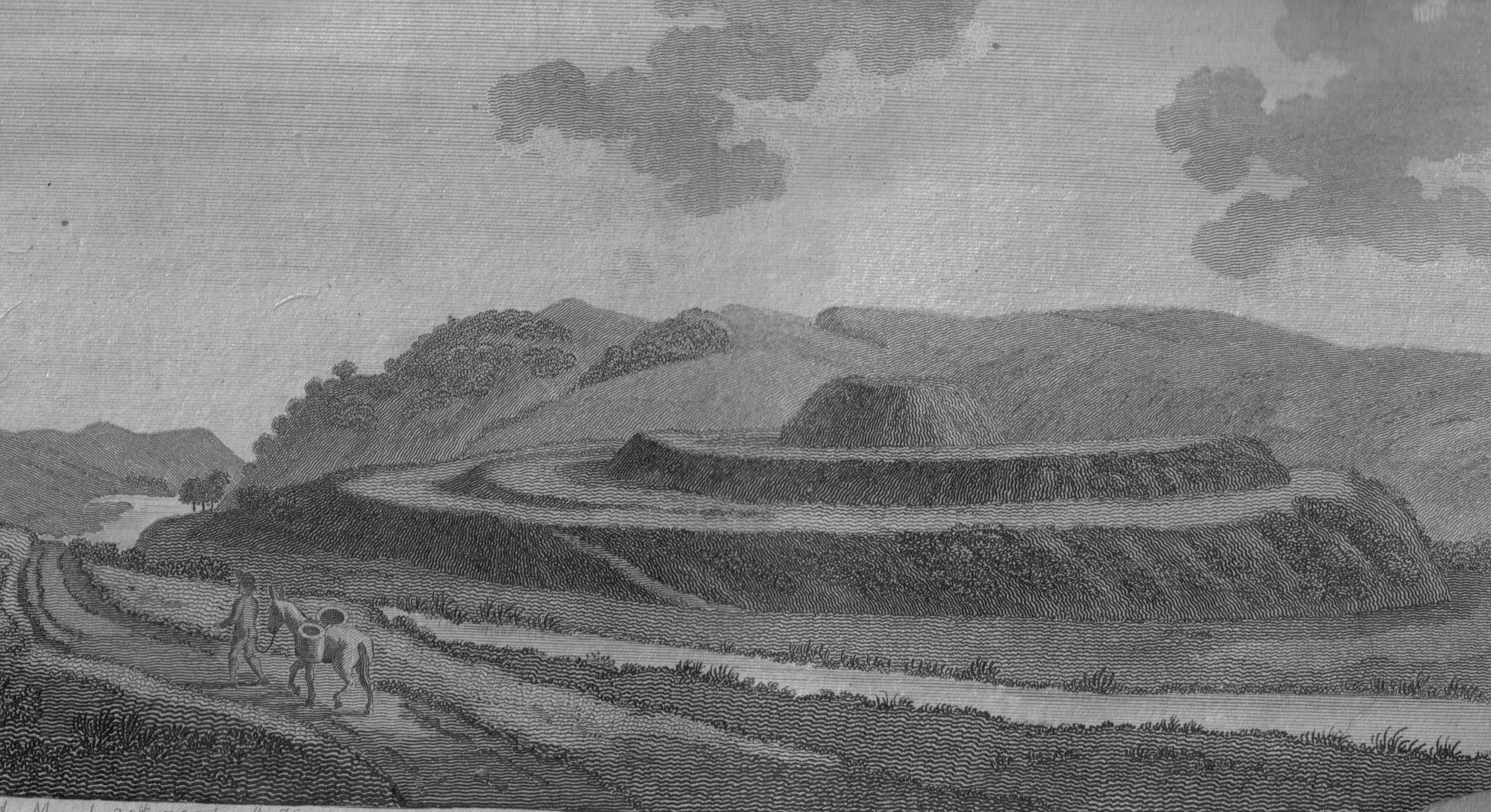
Motte of Urr c. 1797

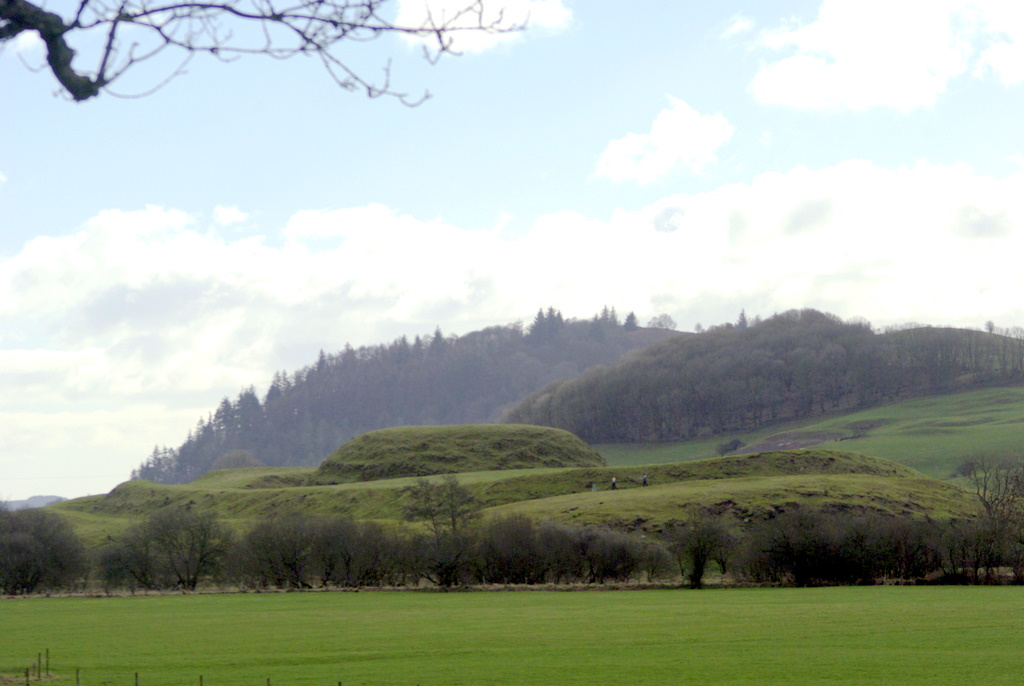
Motte of Urr 2011

The Motte of Urr, is the site of a motte-and-bailey castle. Today this medieval earthwork near the Haugh of Urr is said to be the most extensive bailey earthwork in Scotland. It lies beside the River Urr to the north west of Dalbeattie. It dates from the 12th century, and covers an area of about 2 ha (5 acres). In the present day, there are no excavations or walls. It is associated with Buittle Castle, dated to about 1230, which was destroyed early in the 14th century and belonged to Devorgilla and her husband John I de Balliol (founder of Balliol College, at Oxford University). Together they bore the future king John of Scotland.

== See also ==
- List of listed buildings in Urr, Dumfries and Galloway
- List of United Kingdom locations: Ha-Hd
