= Garbh Eilean, Shiant Islands =

Island in the Shiant Islands, Scotland

Garbh Eilean
Garbh Eilean (Gaelic)

Location
- Garbh Eilean shown within the Outer Hebrides
- OS grid reference: NG414983
- Coordinates: 57.9°N 6.36°W

Name
- Name meaning: Rough Isle

Physical geography
- Island group: Shiant Islands
- Area: 143 hectares (1/2 sq mi)
- Area rank: 126
- Highest elevation: Mullach Buidhe, 160 m (520 ft)

Administration
- Council area: Comhairle nan Eilean Siar
- Country: Scotland
- Sovereign state: United Kingdom

Demographics
- Population: 0

Garbh Eilean (Scottish Gaelic Rough Isle) is one of the Shiant Islands at the south end of the Minch on the west coast of Scotland.

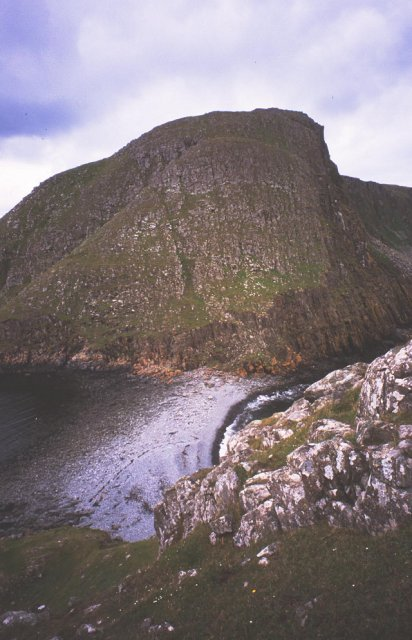
Beach between the two main islands of the Shiants (Garbh Eilean and Eilean an Taighe)

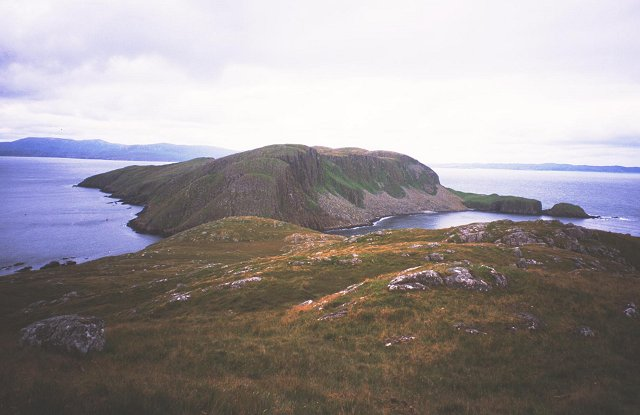
Garbh Eilean from Eilean an Taighe

== Geology ==
In geological terms, these islands essentially represent an extension of the Trotternish peninsula of Skye. The rocks are volcanic, and at 60 Ma, very young by Hebridean standards. Dolerite columns on the north side of Garbh Eilean are over 100 m (330 ft) tall and about 2 m (7 ft) across. Similar to those at Staffa and the Giant's Causeway, they were formed by the slow cooling of volcanic rocks deep underground. Intrusion sills show a progression in their chemical compositions, from olivine-rich rocks at the base to rocks with very little or no olivine at the top. The sills are thought to have formed by crystal settling. Recent study has suggested that at least one of the sills represents a multiple intrusion. In some places the basalt is overlain by Jurassic mudstone, which weathers to form much more fertile soil than elsewhere in the Western Isles.

== Economy ==
The islands were inhabited until the late 18th century, when changes in land ownership and society made the old way of life no longer viable. The previously inhabited and cultivated areas of Àirighean a’ Baigh and Àirighean na h-Annaid are unusually fertile land. Feannagan may still be made out in these areas.

Adam Nicolson, father of the present owner of the Shiants, published a book about them in 2001 under the title of Sea Room 'to tell the whole story'.

== Archaeology ==
There are several possible chapel sites. The first may have been dedicated to St Columba and have been on the west side of Garbh Eilean, perhaps at Àirighean na h-Annaid - the name Annaid means Old Church. There is also evidence of a more recent church, dedicated to the Virgin, near the present cottage on Eilean an Taighe.

A gold torc was dredged up by some Scalpay scallop fishermen south-west of the islands. This beautiful object dates from perhaps 1200BC, and while similar such torcs have turned up elsewhere in UK, this is by far the furthest north. It is possible to speculate endlessly about the provenance of such a find, and whether it got there by shipwreck, or as a votive offering.

== Wildlife ==
The Shiants are a major seabird breeding ground due to their location next to good feeding grounds and lack of predators. Huge numbers of puffins breed in burrows on the slopes of Garbh Eilean, as well as significant numbers of guillemots, razorbills, fulmars, kittiwakes, shags, gulls and great skuas. Although St Kilda has more puffins, the sheer density on the Shiants is greater.

Until 2016 the island had a population of black rats, which may originally have come ashore from a shipwreck. Analysis of their stomach contents showed that the Shiant rats did eat seabirds, but it was impossible to tell if they preyed on live birds or simply scavenged remains. These rats are now rare in the UK. On the Shiants their numbers have been controlled in and around the house for some time, and a comprehensive wildlife project has now extinguished the population.

== See also ==
- List of islands of Scotland
- List of Outer Hebrides
