= Urr Water =

River in Dumfries and Galloway, Scotland

Coordinates: 54°50′N 3°50′W

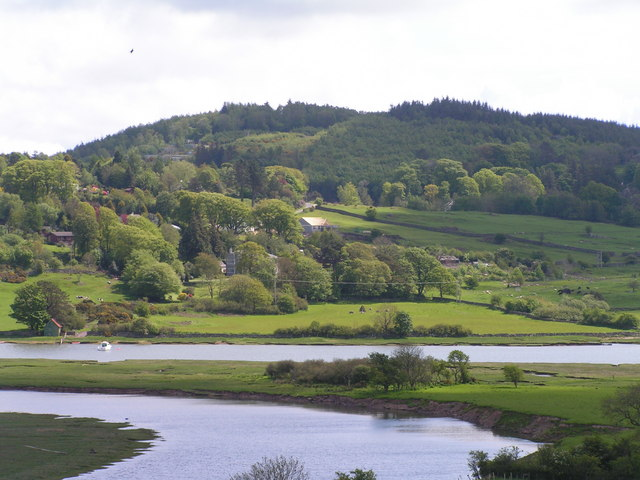
Urr Water

Urr Water or River Urr (arc. River Orr) is a river which flows through the counties of Dumfriesshire and Kirkcudbrightshire in southwest Scotland.

== Course ==
Entirely within Dumfries and Galloway, the Urr Water originates at Loch Urr and flows for thirty-five miles southwards past Corsock, Glenlair, Auchendolly, Bridge of Urr, Haugh of Urr, and close to Dalbeattie, via Palnackie to the Solway Firth at Rough Firth. The village of Kippford stands near the head of the firth where the Urr Water reaches the sea; the only other coastal settlement of any size is Rockcliffe. The principal settlement on the river is Dalbeattie. The river is noted for salmon fishing.

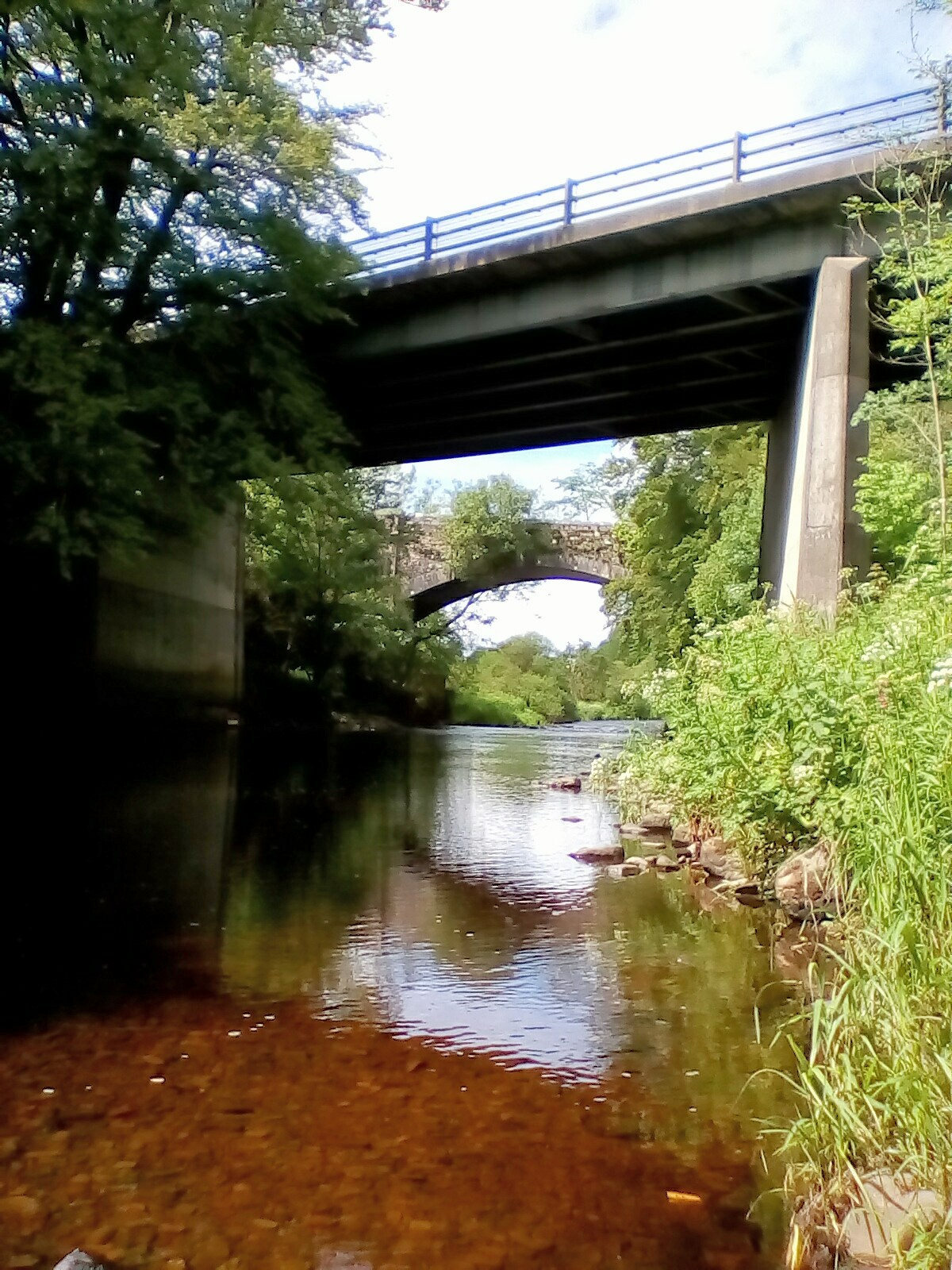
The River Urr as it flows under Old Ramhill Bridge (1798–1800) and New Ramhill Bridge (1972) on the A75 near Castle Douglas in Kirkcudbrightshire.

== Etymology ==
The name 'Urr' is from Cumbric or 'a border, boundary, limit'.

== Gallery ==
Urr Water

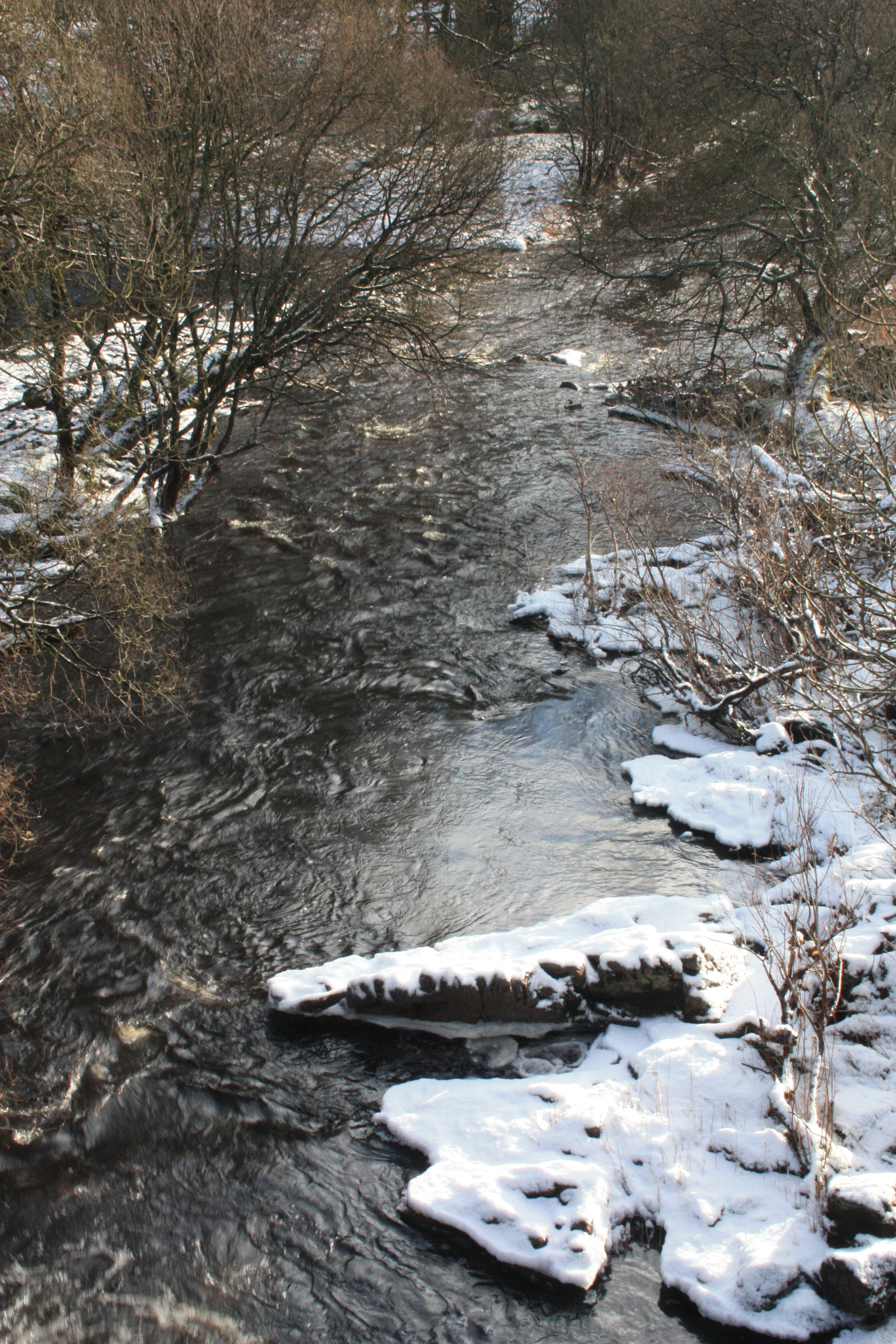
2379+GF Castle Douglas - Looking down from the bridge on a snowy day. See the view on Google maps

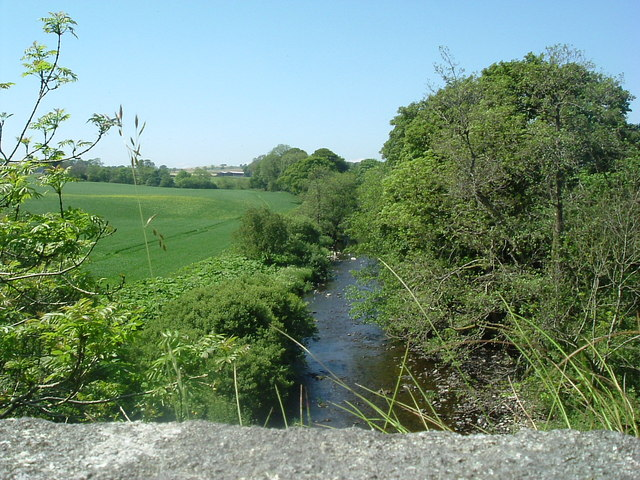
Urr Water upstream, 2007 - View from old Ramhill bridge near Haugh of Urr

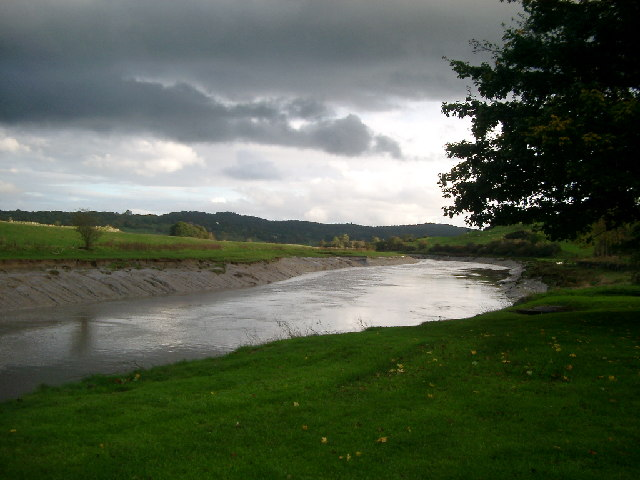
Urr Water near Palnackie, 2005

Urr Estuary

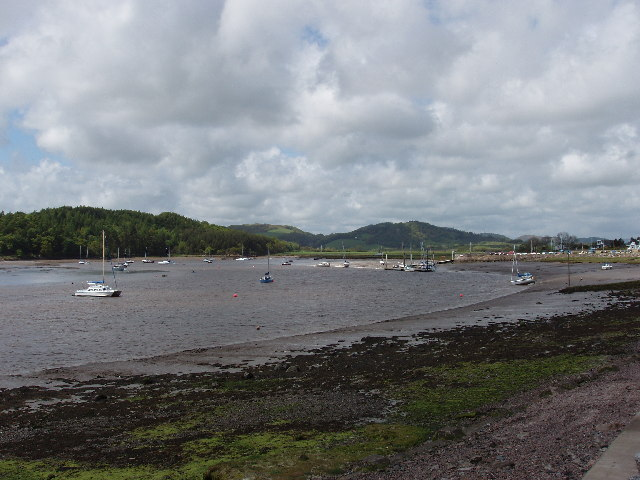
Yachts moored in Urr Water estuary, (Rough Firth, near Kippford), 2005

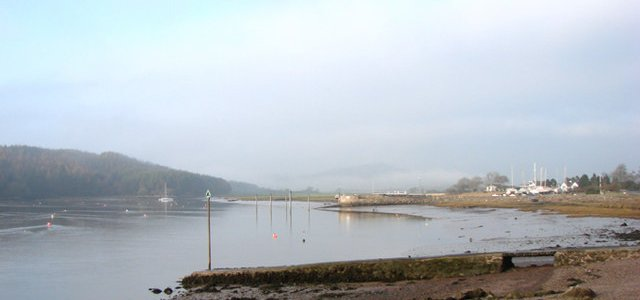
Urr Water estuary, 2006

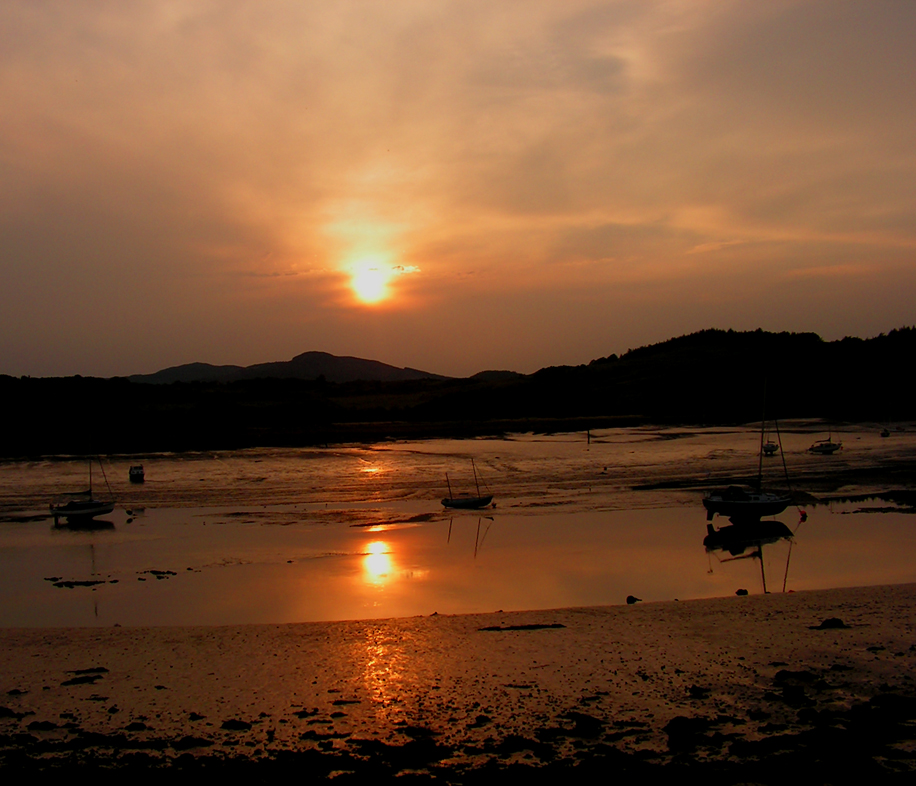
Urr Water estuary, 2006
