= Results of the 2021 Scottish Parliament election =

This is a list of the results of the 2021 Scottish Parliament election.

== National results ==
Party	Constituency					Regional					Total seats	±
Party	Votes	%	±%	Seats	±	Votes	%	±%	Seats	±	Total seats	±
SNP	1,291,204	47.7	▲1.2	62	▲3	1,094,374	40.3	▼1.4	2	▼2	64	▲1
Conservative	592,518	21.9	▼0.1	5	▼2	637,131	23.5	▲0.6	26	▲2	31	Steady
Labour	584,392	21.6	▼1.0	2	▼1	485,819	17.9	▼1.0	20	▼1	22	▼2
Greens	34,990	1.3	▲0.7	0	Steady	220,324	8.1	▲1.5	8	▲2	8	▲2
Liberal Democrats	187,746	6.9	▼0.9	4	Steady	137,151	5.1	▼0.1	0	▼1	4	▼1
Alba						44,913	1.7	New	0	New	0	New
All for Unity						23,299	0.9	New	0	New	0	New
Scottish Family	2,734	0.1	New	0	New	16,085	0.6	New	0	New	0	New
Independent Green Voice						9,756	0.4	New	0	New	0	New
Abolish the Scottish Parliament						7,262	0.3	New	0	New	0	New
Freedom Alliance	1,154	0.0	New	0	New	6,271	0.2	New	0	New	0	New
Reform UK						5,793	0.2	New	0	New	0	New
Libertarian	1,913	0.1	▲0.1	0	Steady	4,988	0.2	▲0.1	0	Steady	0	Steady
UKIP	699	0.0	New	0	New	3,848	0.1	▼1.9	0	Steady	0	Steady
Animal Welfare						2,392	0.1	Steady	0	Steady	0	Steady
Women's Equality						1,896	0.1	▼0.2	0	Steady	0	Steady
TUSC	959	0.0	▼0.1	0	Steady	1,404	0.1	Steady	0	Steady	0	Steady
Restore Scotland	1,192	0.0	Steady	0	New	1,149	0.0	New	0	New	0	New
Communist	194	0.0	Steady	0	Steady	1,142	0.0	Steady	0	Steady	0	Steady
Liberal	102	0.0	New	0	New						0	New
Renew						493	0.0	New	0	New	0	New
Scotia Future	1,032	0.0	New	0	New	451	0.0	New	0	New	0	New
SDP						405	0.0	New	0	New	0	New
Reclaim	114	0.0	New	0	New	174	0.0	New	0	New	0	New
Vanguard	67	0.0	New	0	New	92	0.0	New	0	New	0	New
Independents	5,673	0.2	Steady	0	Steady	6,122	0.2	Steady	0	Steady	0	Steady
Total	2,706,683	100.0		73		2,712,735	100.0		56		129	

== Results by region ==
=== Summary ===
Vote share by region
Region	Turnout	Constituency vote share (%)						Regional vote share (%)					
Region	Turnout	SNP	Con	Lab	Grn	LD	Other	SNP	Con	Lab	Grn	LD	Other
Central Scotland	62.0							45.3	18.3	23.7	6.0	1.9	4.8
Glasgow	57.0							43.9	12.1	24.3	11.8	2.0	5.9
Highlands and Islands	66.0							40.4	25.4	9.5	7.4	11.2	6.1
Lothian	64.0							35.9	19.9	19.4	12.7	7.2	4.9
Mid Scotland and Fife	65.0							39.8	25.0	15.3	8.3	7.4	4.2
North East Scotland	61.0							40.9	30.6	11.4	6.3	5.0	5.8
South Scotland	65.0							37.6	33.5	15.7	5.2	3.4	4.6
West Scotland	67.0							40.4	21.9	22.2	7.1	3.6	4.8
Total								40.3	23.5	17.9	8.1	5.1	5.1

Seats by region
Region	Constituency seats				Regional seats					Total seats				
Region	SNP	Con	Lab	LD	SNP	Con	Lab	Grn	LD	SNP	Con	Lab	Grn	LD
Central Scotland	9	0	0	0	0	3	3	1	0	9	3	3	1	0
Glasgow	9	0	0	0	0	2	4	1	0	9	2	4	1	0
Highlands and Islands	6	0	0	2	1	4	1	1	0	7	4	1	1	2
Lothian	7	0	1	1	0	3	2	2	0	7	3	3	2	1
Mid Scotland and Fife	8	0	0	1	0	4	2	1	0	8	4	2	1	1
North East Scotland	9	1	0	0	0	4	2	1	0	9	5	2	1	0
South Scotland	6	3	0	0	1	3	3	0	0	7	6	3	0	0
West Scotland	8	1	1	0	0	3	3	1	0	8	4	4	1	0
Total	62	5	2	4	2	26	20	8	0	64	31	22	8	4

=== Central Scotland ===
Results
Party	Constituency					Regional					Total seats	±
Party	Votes	%	±%	Seats	±	Votes	%	±%	Seats	±	Total seats	±
SNP				9	Steady	148,399	45.3	▼2.4	0	Steady	9	Steady
Labour				0	Steady	77,623	23.7	▼1.1	3	▼1	3	▼1
Conservative				0	Steady	59,896	18.3	▲2.2	3	Steady	3	Steady
Greens				0	Steady	19,512	6.0	▲1.3	1	▲1	1	▲1
Liberal Democrats				0	Steady	6,337	1.9	▲0.1	0	Steady	0	Steady
Alba				0	New	5,345	1.6	New	0	New	0	New
All for Unity				0	New	2,712	0.8	New	0	New	0	New
Scottish Family Party				0	New	2,105	0.6	New	0	New	0	New
Independent Green Voice				0	New	1,854	0.6	New	0	New	0	New
Abolish the Scottish Parliament				0	New	841	0.3	New	0	New	0	New
Reform UK				0	New	650	0.2	New	0	New	0	New
Libertarian				0	New	626	0.2	New	0	New	0	New
Freedom Alliance				0	New	619	0.2	New	0	New	0	New
Independent				0	Steady	488	0.1	Steady	0	Steady	0	Steady
UKIP				0	Steady	485	0.1	Steady	0	Steady	0	Steady
Total		100.0		9		328,039	100.0		7		16	

Elected MSPs
Seat	Party	MSP
1	Labour	Richard Leonard
2	Conservative	Stephen Kerr
3	Labour	Monica Lennon
4	Conservative	Graham Simpson
5	Labour	Mark Griffin
6	Conservative	Meghan Gallacher
7	Greens	Gillian Mackay

=== Glasgow ===
Results
Party	Constituency					Regional					Total seats	±
Party	Votes	%	±%	Seats	±	Votes	%	±%	Seats	±	Total seats	±
SNP				9	Steady	133,917	43.9	▼0.9	0	Steady	9	Steady
Labour				0	Steady	74,088	24.3	▲0.5	4	Steady	4	Steady
Conservative				0	Steady	37,027	12.1	▲0.2	2	Steady	2	Steady
Greens	13,094			0	Steady	36,114	11.8	▲2.4	1	Steady	1	Steady
Liberal Democrats				0	Steady	6,079	2.0	▼0.4	0	Steady	0	Steady
Alba						5,408	1.8	New	0	New	0	New
All for Unity						2,562	0.8	New	0	New	0	New
Independent Green Voice						2,210	0.7	New	0	New	0	New
Scottish Family Party						1,728	0.6	New	0	New	0	New
Women's Equality Party						772	0.3	▼0.5	0	Steady	0	Steady
Freedom Alliance	204		New	0	New	759	0.2	New	0	New	0	New
Abolish the Scottish Parliament						702	0.2	New	0	New	0	New
Libertarian	157		New	0	New	680	0.2	New	0	New	0	New
Trade Unionist and Socialist Coalition						645	0.2	New	0	New	0	New
Communist Party of Britain						544	0.2	New	0	New	0	New
Reform UK						543	0.2	New	0	New	0	New
UKIP	185		New	0	New	447	0.1	▼1.9	0	Steady	0	Steady
SDP						178	0.1	New	0	New	0	New
Reclaim	114		New	0	New	174	0.1	New	0	New	0	New
Renew						100	0.0	New	0	New	0	New
Liberal	102		New	0	New							
Independents	287		New	0	New	367	0.1	Steady	0	Steady	0	Steady
Total												

Elected MSPs
Seat	Party	MSP
1	Labour	Pauline McNeill
2	Labour	Anas Sarwar
3	Conservative	Annie Wells
4	Greens	Patrick Harvie
5	Labour	Paul Sweeney
6	Labour	Pam Duncan-Glancy
7	Conservative	Sandesh Gulhane

=== Highlands and Islands ===
Results
Party	Constituency					Regional					Total seats	±
Party	Votes	%	±%	Seats	±	Votes	%	±%	Seats	±	Total seats	±
SNP				6	Steady	96,413	40.4	▲0.6	1	Steady	7	Steady
Conservative				0	Steady	60,779	25.4	▲3.7	4	▲1	4	▲1
Liberal Democrats				2	Steady	26,771	11.2	▼2.1	0	Steady	2	Steady
Labour				0	Steady	22,713	9.5	▼1.6	1	▼1	1	▼1
Greens	2,636			0	New	17,729	7.4	▲0.2	1	Steady	1	Steady
Alba						3,828	1.6	New	0	New	0	New
Scottish Family Party						1,976	0.8	New	0	New	0	New
All for Unity						1,540	0.6	New	0	New	0	New
Abolish the Scottish Parliament						686	0.3	New	0	New	0	New
Freedom Alliance	289	0.8	New	0	New	671	0.3	New	0	New	0	New
Libertarian	222	0.6	New	0	New	488	0.2	New	0	New	0	New
UKIP	188		New	0	New	457	0.2	▼2.4	0	Steady	0	Steady
Restore Scotland	451		New	0	New	437	0.2	New	0	New	0	New
Trade Unionist and Socialist Coalition						280	0.1	New	0	New	0	New
Independents	687		New	0	New	3,367	1.4	New	0	New	0	New
Total												

Elected MSPs
Seat	Party	MSP
1	Conservative	Douglas Ross
2	Conservative	Edward Mountain
3	Labour	Rhoda Grant
4	Conservative	Donald Cameron
5	Scottish Greens	Ariane Burgess
6	Conservative	Jamie Halcro Johnston
7	SNP	Emma Roddick

=== Lothian ===
Results
Party	Constituency					Regional					Total seats	±
Party	Votes	%	±%	Seats	±	Votes	%	±%	Seats	±	Total seats	±
SNP				7	▲1	141,478	35.9	▼0.4	0	Steady	7	▲1
Conservative				0	▼1	78,595	19.9	▼3.0	3	Steady	3	▼1
Labour				1	Steady	76,689	19.4	▼1.3	2	Steady	3	Steady
Greens	10,037			0		49,984	12.7	▲2.1	2	Steady	2	Steady
Liberal Democrats				1	Steady	28,433	7.2	▲1.6	0	Steady	1	Steady
Alba						6,141	1.6	New	0	New	0	New
All for Unity						2,423	0.6	New	0	New	0	New
Animal Welfare Party						2,392	0.6	New	0	New	0	New
Scottish Family Party	779		New	0	New	2,041	0.5	New	0	New	0	New
Women's Equality Party						1,124	0.3	▼0.9	0	Steady	0	Steady
Freedom Alliance	314		New	0	New	922	0.2	New	0	New	0	New
Abolish the Scottish Parliament						828	0.2	New	0	New	0	New
Reform UK						810	0.2	New	0	New	0	New
Libertarian	338		New	0	New	689	0.2	New	0	New	0	New
Communist Party of Britain						598	0.2	New	0	New	0	New
UKIP	78		New	0	New	420	0.1	▼1.7	0	Steady	0	Steady
SDP						227	0.1	New	0	New	0	New
Renew						102	0.0	New	0	New	0	New
Independents	363		Steady	0	Steady	430	0.1	Steady	0	Steady	0	Steady
Total												

Elected MSPs
Seat	Party	MSP
1	Conservative	Miles Briggs
2	Greens	Alison Johnstone
3	Conservative	Sue Webber
4	Labour	Sarah Boyack
5	Conservative	Jeremy Balfour
6	Labour	Foysol Choudhury
7	Greens	Lorna Slater

=== Mid Scotland and Fife ===
Results
Party	Constituency					Regional					Total seats	±
Party	Votes	%	±%	Seats	±	Votes	%	±%	Seats	±	Total seats	±
SNP				8	Steady	136,825	39.8	▼1.5	0	Steady	8	Steady
Conservative				0	Steady	85,909	25.0	▼0.2	4	Steady	4	Steady
Labour				0	Steady	52,626	15.3	▼2.3	2	Steady	2	Steady
Greens				0	Steady	28,654	8.3	▲2.2	1	Steady	1	Steady
Liberal Democrats				1	Steady	25,489	7.4	▲0.4	0	Steady	1	Steady
Alba						5,893	1.7	New	0	New	0	New
All for Unity						2,578	0.7	New	0	New	0	New
Abolish the Scottish Parliament								New	0	New	0	New
Freedom Alliance								New	0	New	0	New
Reform UK									0		0	
Renew									0		0	
Scottish Family Party									0		0	
Libertarian	269		New	0	New	818	0.2	New	0	New	0	New
UKIP									0		0	
Independents					Steady				0		0	
Total												

Elected MSPs
Seat	Party	MSP
1	Conservative	Murdo Fraser
2	Conservative	Liz Smith
3	Labour	Claire Baker
4	Greens	Mark Ruskell
5	Conservative	Dean Lockhart
6	Labour	Alex Rowley
7	Conservative	Alexander Stewart

=== North East Scotland ===
Results
Party	Constituency					Regional					Total seats	±
Party	Votes	%	±%	Seats	±	Votes	%	±%	Seats	±	Total seats	±
SNP				9	Steady	147,910	40.9	▼3.7	0	Steady	9	Steady
Conservative				1	Steady	110,555	30.6	▲2.6	4	Steady	5	Steady
Labour				0	Steady	41,062	11.4	▼1.3	2	Steady	2	Steady
Greens				0	Steady	22,735	6.3	▲1.4	1	▲1	1	▲1
Liberal Democrats				0	Steady	18,050	5.0	▼1.0	0	▼1	0	▼1
Alba						8,269	2.3	New	0	New	0	New
All for Unity						2,561	0.7	New	0	New	0	New
Abolish the Scottish Parliament								New	0	New	0	New
Freedom Alliance								New	0	New	0	New
Independent Green Voice									0		0	
Reform UK									0		0	
Renew									0		0	
Restore Scotland									0		0	
Scottish Family Party									0		0	
Libertarian									0		0	
Trade Unionist and Socialist Coalition									0		0	
UKIP									0		0	
Independents					Steady				0	Steady	0	Steady
Total												

Elected MSPs
Seat	Party	MSP
1	Conservative	Liam Kerr
2	Labour	Michael Marra
3	Conservative	Douglas Lumsden
4	Conservative	Maurice Golden
5	Greens	Maggie Chapman
6	Conservative	Tess White
7	Labour	Mercedes Villalba

=== South Scotland ===
Results
Party	Constituency					Regional					Total seats	±
Party	Votes	%	±%	Seats	±	Votes	%	±%	Seats	±	Total seats	±
SNP				6	▲2	136,741	37.6	▼0.7	1	Steady	7	▲2
Conservative				3	▼1	121,730	33.5	▲1.4	3	Steady	6	▼1
Labour				0	▼1	57,236	15.7	▼2.1	3	Steady	3	▼1
Greens				0	Steady	18,964	5.2	▲0.5	0	Steady	0	Steady
Liberal Democrats				0	Steady	12,422	3.4	▼0.3	0	Steady	0	Steady
All for Unity				0	New	5,521	1.5	New	0	New	0	New
Alba				0	New	3,896	1.1	New	0	New	0	New
Abolish the Scottish Parliament				0	New			New	0	New	0	New
Freedom Alliance				0	New			New	0	New	0	New
Independent Green Voice				0					0		0	
Reform UK				0					0		0	
Scotia Future				0					0		0	
Scottish Family Party				0					0		0	
Libertarian				0					0		0	
UKIP				0					0		0	
Vanguard Party				0					0		0	
Independents				0	Steady				0	Steady	0	Steady
Total												

Elected MSPs
Seat	Party	MSP
1	Labour	Colin Smyth
2	Conservative	Craig Hoy
3	Labour	Carol Mochan
4	Conservative	Brian Whittle
5	Conservative	Sharon Dowey
6	SNP	Emma Harper
7	Labour	Martin Whitfield

=== West Scotland ===
Results
Party	Constituency					Regional					Total seats	±
Party	Votes	%	±%	Seats	±	Votes	%	±%	Seats	±	Total seats	±
SNP				8	Steady	152,671	40.4	▼1.8	0	Steady	8	Steady
Labour				1	Steady	83,775	22.2	▼0.3	3	Steady	4	Steady
Conservative				1	Steady	82,650	21.9	▼0.3	3	Steady	4	Steady
Greens				0	Steady	26,632	7.1	▲1.7	1	Steady	1	Steady
Liberal Democrats				0	Steady	13,570	3.6	▼0.2	0	Steady	0	Steady
Alba				0	New	6,133	1.6	New	0	New	0	New
All for Unity				0	New	3,372	0.9	New	0	New	0	New
Abolish the Scottish Parliament				0	New			New	0	New	0	New
Freedom Alliance				0	New			New	0	New	0	New
Independent Green Voice				0					0		0	
Reform UK				0					0		0	
Renew Party				0					0		0	
Scotia Future				0					0		0	
Scottish Family Party				0					0		0	
Libertarian				0					0		0	
Trade Unionist and Socialist Coalition				0					0		0	
UKIP				0					0		0	
Independents				0	Steady			Steady	0	Steady	0	Steady
Total												

Elected MSPs
Seat	Party	MSP
1	Labour	Neil Bibby
2	Conservative	Russell Findlay
3	Labour	Katy Clark
4	Conservative	Jamie Greene
5	Greens	Ross Greer
6	Labour	Paul O'Kane
7	Conservative	Pam Gosal

== Results by constituency ==
Constituency	Region	2016 winner	2021 result				Constituency vote share (%)						Regional vote share (%)					
Constituency	Region	2016 winner	Party	MSP	Majority	Turnout (%)	SNP	Con	Lab	LD	Grn	Other	SNP	Con	Lab	LD	Grn	Other
Aberdeen Central	North East	SNP	SNP	Kevin Stewart	6,594	56.0	44.9	24.1	19.9	4.5	6.6	-	39.0	24.2	16.5	4.9	9.9	5.6
Aberdeen Donside	North East	SNP	SNP	Jackie Dunbar	9,026	58.0	51.6	26.4	15.3	6.0	-	0.7	45.2	24.6	14.7	4.8	4.9	5.8
Aberdeen South and North Kincardine	North East	SNP	SNP	Audrey Nicoll	1,671	64.0	42.3	38.0	11.5	7.4	-	0.7	36.2	34.8	12.2	6.0	5.7	5.0
Aberdeenshire East	North East	SNP	SNP	Gillian Martin	1,889	64.0	44.6	40.0	7.1	8.3	-	-	36.2	36.8	7.5	7.3	5.7	6.5
Aberdeenshire West	North East	Con	Con	Alexander Burnett	3,390	70.0	39.1	47.2	5.7	8.1	-	-	32.0	42.4	6.8	8.1	6.1	4.6
Airdrie and Shotts	Central	SNP	SNP	Neil Gray	5,468	59.0	50.6	13.9	33.4	1.8	-	0.4	44.6	20.4	24.9	1.5	4.3	4.2
Almond Valley	Lothian	SNP	SNP	Angela Constance	12,130	61.0	54.3	16.6	25.2	3.8	-	-	45.2	18.8	20.2	2.9	7.3	5.6
Angus North and Mearns	North East	SNP	SNP	Mairi Gougeon	3,509	64.0	48.6	38.7	7.6	5.1	-	-	40.6	35.2	8.2	4.5	6.1	5.4
Angus South	North East	SNP	SNP	Graeme Dey	6,117	65.0	50.7	34.8	9.4	5.1	-	-	42.7	32.4	9.6	4.0	5.9	5.4
Argyll and Bute	Highlands	SNP	SNP	Jenni Minto	8,963	68.0	49.5	22.8	7.3	20.5	-	-	41.5	25.5	8.4	10.9	7.9	5.8
Ayr	South	Con	SNP	Siobhian Brown	170	68.0	43.5	43.1	11.0	1.9	-	0.6	38.7	36.2	13.8	2.0	4.7	4.6
Banffshire and Buchan Coast	North East	SNP	SNP	Karen Adam	772	56.0	45.2	42.9	6.6	3.2	-	2.1	39.2	39.8	6.7	2.8	3.5	8.0
Caithness, Sutherland and Ross	Highlands	SNP	SNP	Maree Todd	2,591	65.0	43.1	14.0	5.5	36.1	-	1.4	38.5	21.4	7.4	21.2	5.6	6.0
Carrick, Cumnock and Doon Valley	South	SNP	SNP	Elena Whitham	4,337	59.0	42.8	30.6	24.2	2.5	-	-	39.1	30.3	20.1	1.8	3.4	5.3
Clackmannanshire and Dunblane	Mid and Fife	SNP	SNP	Keith Brown	7,551	66.0	47.2	25.6	23.7	3.4	-	-	37.4	26.5	18.6	3.4	9.4	4.7
Clydebank and Milngavie	West	SNP	SNP	Marie McNair	5,274	68.0	47.2	11.0	33.2	7.9	-	0.6	40.1	17.6	23.5	5.8	8.7	4.4
Clydesdale	South	SNP	SNP	Màiri McAllan	4,578	67.0	43.2	32.0	22.0	2.8	-	-	36.9	29.9	20.2	2.8	5.5	4.7
Coatbridge and Chryston	Central	SNP	SNP	Fulton MacGregor	9,437	63.0	57.5	8.5	31.1	1.7	-	1.1	50.8	12.7	24.3	1.5	5.9	4.8
Cowdenbeath	Mid and Fife	SNP	SNP	Annabelle Ewing	6,013	61.0	48.3	13.9	30.7	3.2	3.9	-	44.0	17.2	24.3	3.9	6.5	4.5
Cumbernauld and Kilsyth	Central	SNP	SNP	Jamie Hepburn	9,841	65.0	58.6	10.1	29.2	2.0	-	-	49.5	13.9	23.2	1.7	6.7	4.9
Cunninghame North	West	SNP	SNP	Kenneth Gibson	7,776	64.0	49.0	28.1	20.3	2.6	-	-	41.6	26.3	17.2	2.2	6.6	6.0
Cunninghame South	West	SNP	SNP	Ruth Maguire	7,952	58.0	50.5	22.0	24.1	2.4	-	1.1	46.0	21.9	21.0	1.9	4.1	5.1
Dumbarton	West	Lab	Lab	Jackie Baillie	1,483	68.0	42.5	8.3	46.3	1.8	-	1.0	38.4	21.1	26.6	2.6	6.4	5.1
Dumfriesshire	South	Con	Con	Oliver Mundell	4,066	66.0	37.7	47.7	11.4	3.2	-	-	34.9	42.9	11.8	2.5	3.4	4.5
Dunfermline	Mid and Fife	SNP	SNP	Shirley-Anne Somerville	8,664	66.0	49.0	15.4	27.8	7.8	-	-	40.5	19.2	20.6	7.2	8.4	4.2
Dundee City East	North East	SNP	SNP	Shona Robison	13,337	58.0	59.2	17.3	18.1	4.4	-	0.9	50.4	17.5	16.0	3.3	7.0	5.9
Dundee City West	North East	SNP	SNP	Joe FitzPatrick	12,919	57.0	61.6	10.3	21.5	3.9	-	2.6	52.1	11.8	18.0	2.8	8.9	6.4
East Kilbride	Central	SNP	SNP	Collette Stevenson	8,672	66.0	51.9	14.5	30.6	3.0	-	-	44.8	17.4	23.5	2.3	7.1	4.9
East Lothian	South	Lab	SNP	Paul McLennan	1,179	69.0	39.2	20.7	36.7	3.4	-	-	33.8	25.9	24.4	3.5	8.3	4.1
Eastwood	West	Con	Con	Jackson Carlaw	2,216	76.0	36.8	41.9	15.8	2.1	-	3.4	29.0	35.9	19.7	2.9	8.2	4.3
Edinburgh Central	Lothian	Con	SNP	Angus Robertson	4,732	63.0	39.0	27.7	16.4	6.1	9.4	1.4	29.9	23.4	16.4	7.4	18.2	4.8
Edinburgh Eastern	Lothian	SNP	SNP	Ash Denham	10,117	61.0	52.4	13.8	29.0	4.7	-	-	39.6	15.8	21.0	3.6	14.5	5.6
Edinburgh Northern and Leith	Lothian	SNP	SNP	Ben Macpherson	11,569	63.0	47.9	10.8	23.2	4.3	13.1	0.7	38.7	13.4	18.6	4.6	19.7	4.9
Edinburgh Pentlands	Lothian	SNP	SNP	Gordon MacDonald	3,897	65.0	42.4	32.3	18.3	5.8	-	1.2	33.7	28.3	18.0	5.6	9.7	4.7
Edinburgh Southern	Lothian	Lab	Lab	Daniel Johnson	4,022	71.0	37.0	11.6	45.9	4.8	-	0.7	24.3	20.6	24.5	7.4	18.9	4.2
Edinburgh Western	Lothian	LD	LD	Alex Cole-Hamilton	9,885	71.0	33.5	6.0	5.4	54.7	-	0.4	30.8	20.0	11.0	25.5	8.8	4.1
Ettrick, Roxburgh and Berwickshire	South	Con	Con	Rachael Hamilton	6,863	64.0	32.5	51.5	5.7	6.5	3.0	0.8	30.1	47.4	6.8	6.7	4.6	4.4
Falkirk East	Central	SNP	SNP	Michelle Thomson	7,585	63.0	47.4	19.6	27.9	2.6	-	2.5	42.2	22.6	21.9	2.3	6.0	4.9
Falkirk West	Central	SNP	SNP	Michael Matheson	11,839	62.0	54.3	18.5	24.4	2.8	-	-	45.4	20.5	19.7	2.4	7.1	5.0
Galloway and West Dumfries	South	Con	Con	Finlay Carson	2,635	65.0	39.9	47.0	7.9	2.5	2.6	-	36.8	42.0	9.4	2.7	4.3	4.9
Glasgow Anniesland	Glasgow	SNP	SNP	Bill Kidd	6,588	58.0	52.8	11.1	32.9	3.2	-	-	41.7	13.9	24.5	2.7	11.1	6.1
Glasgow Cathcart	Glasgow	SNP	SNP	James Dornan	10,396	62.0	57.0	10.6	29.7	2.8	-	-	40.8	12.5	23.3	2.1	15.9	5.4
Glasgow Kelvin	Glasgow	SNP	SNP	Kaukab Stewart	5,458	54.0	40.3	7.9	23.9	2.7	25.2	-	39.4	10.8	20.2	2.9	21.0	5.7
Glasgow Maryhill and Springburn	Glasgow	SNP	SNP	Bob Doris	7,924	52.0	59.0	8.0	30.5	2.5	-	-	47.1	10.7	24.8	1.8	10.2	6.2
Glasgow Pollok	Glasgow	SNP	SNP	Humza Yousaf	7,105	54.0	53.7	5.5	32.7	1.5	4.9	1.6	49.1	11.3	26.3	1.3	5.8	6.1
Glasgow Provan	Glasgow	SNP	SNP	Ivan McKee	7,230	52.0	52.9	8.9	28.9	1.4	7.9	-	49.5	10.7	24.6	1.2	5.6	5.6
Glasgow Shettleston	Glasgow	SNP	SNP	John Mason	8,025	53.0	54.4	13.8	29.4	2.4	-	-	45.8	15.0	24.6	1.3	7.6	5.7
Glasgow Southside	Glasgow	SNP	SNP	Nicola Sturgeon	9,456	59.0	60.2	5.5	31.3	1.5	-	1.4	41.6	8.8	23.5	1.7	18.4	5.9
Greenock and Inverclyde	West	SNP	SNP	Stuart McMillan	8,174	63.0	54.2	9.1	31.7	2.8	-	2.1	48.3	14.3	23.5	2.6	6.3	4.9
Hamilton, Larkhall and Stonehouse	Central	SNP	SNP	Christina McKelvie	4,582	61.0	46.2	17.5	33.6	2.8	-	-	41.0	21.5	25.2	2.2	5.2	4.5
Inverness and Nairn	Highlands	SNP	SNP	Fergus Ewing	9,114	64.0	47.7	27.7	11.7	6.3	5.8	0.8	43.0	26.3	11.2	6.2	7.4	6.0
Kilmarnock and Irvine Valley	South	SNP	SNP	Willie Coffey	11,681	61.0	52.7	20.4	24.0	2.3	-	0.6	45.8	21.6	20.1	2.1	5.0	5.4
Kirkcaldy	Mid and Fife	SNP	SNP	David Torrance	7,831	58.0	52.4	13.9	30.1	2.9	-	0.8	44.6	17.4	23.1	2.9	7.1	5.0
Linlithgow	Lothian	SNP	SNP	Fiona Hyslop	10,105	62.0	48.4	20.2	26.9	4.5	-	-	39.8	22.4	21.6	3.3	7.6	5.3
Mid Fife and Glenrothes	Mid and Fife	SNP	SNP	Jenny Gilruth	10,234	60.0	55.4	13.8	24.1	5.5	-	1.2	48.5	17.3	19.3	4.8	5.5	4.6
Midlothian North and Musselburgh	Lothian	SNP	SNP	Colin Beattie	7,906	61.0	49.7	15.3	31.1	3.8	-	-	41.2	18.1	23.9	3.2	8.9	4.8
Midlothian South, Tweeddale and Lauderdale	South	SNP	SNP	Christine Grahame	6,826	66.0	46.0	30.2	12.6	6.1	5.0	0.2	41.5	28.0	13.2	6.6	7.0	3.8
Moray	Highlands	SNP	SNP	Richard Lochhead	3,164	65.0	48.6	40.9	7.2	2.8	-	0.5	40.3	38.6	7.8	2.8	6.1	4.4
Motherwell and Wishaw	Central	SNP	SNP	Clare Adamson	7,813	59.0	53.2	13.1	30.3	1.6	-	1.8	45.9	17.3	24.7	1.5	5.7	4.9
Na h-Eileanan an Iar	Highlands	SNP	SNP	Alasdair Allan	3,441	66.0	51.4	14.6	27.7	2.4	-	3.9	43.1	17.8	21.3	2.2	5.8	9.7
North East Fife	Mid and Fife	LD	LD	Willie Rennie	7,448	69.0	36.6	5.8	2.6	55.1	-	-	30.9	20.1	6.0	29.1	10.1	3.8
Orkney	Highlands	LD	LD	Liam McArthur	3,869	65.0	29.1	6.0	2.5	62.4	-	-	29.2	19.0	6.3	31.2	9.5	4.8
Paisley	West	SNP	SNP	George Adam	6,075	62.0	50.0	9.6	32.7	3.2	4.5	-	46.0	14.1	25.1	2.6	7.3	5.0
Perthshire North	Mid and Fife	SNP	SNP	John Swinney	4,053	70.0	49.5	39.4	5.8	4.5	-	0.8	40.1	36.5	7.1	4.3	8.1	4.0
Perthshire South and Kinross-shire	Mid and Fife	SNP	SNP	Jim Fairlie	1,948	70.0	45.7	41.2	6.7	6.4	-	-	36.4	36.9	8.1	6.1	8.6	3.9
Renfrewshire North and West	West	SNP	SNP	Natalie Don	7,307	68.0	46.4	22.9	27.2	2.4	-	1.1	39.2	24.5	22.6	2.6	6.5	4.6
Renfrewshire South	West	SNP	SNP	Tom Arthur	7,106	66.0	50.5	14.8	30.0	2.4	-	2.2	43.4	18.2	23.9	2.3	7.0	5.2
Rutherglen	Glasgow	SNP	SNP	Clare Haughey	5,166	63.0	50.5	9.1	37.6	2.8	-	-	42.3	14.7	27.4	2.5	7.2	5.9
Shetland	Highlands	LD	LD	Beatrice Wishart	806	66.0	41.9	4.2	3.6	48.6	-	1.8	34.5	15.7	8.4	26.5	9.7	5.2
Skye, Lochaber and Badenoch	Highlands	SNP	SNP	Kate Forbes	15,861	68.0	56.1	19.3	8.9	15.7	-	-	42.0	22.4	9.2	9.8	9.2	7.4
Stirling	Mid and Fife	SNP	SNP	Evelyn Tweed	6,895	69.0	48.6	31.8	16.0	3.6	-	-	38.5	29.2	14.7	3.4	10.5	3.8
Strathkelvin and Bearsden	West	SNP	SNP	Rona Mackay	11,484	72.0	45.5	20.7	18.4	14.4	-	0.9	36.7	22.0	19.6	8.8	8.3	4.4
Uddingston and Bellshill	Central	SNP	SNP	Stephanie Callaghan	5,306	61.0	49.9	12.7	35.1	2.3	-	-	44.3	17.3	26.5	1.6	5.2	5.0
Total						63.0	47.7	21.9	21.6	6.9	1.3	0.2	40.3	23.5	17.9	5.1	8.1	5.1
