= Committees of the Scottish Parliament =

Scottish Parliament committees (Scottish Gaelic: Comataidhean Pàrlamaid na h-Alba) are small groups of Members of the Scottish Parliament (MSPs) who meet on a regular basis to scrutinise the work of the Scottish Government, conduct inquiries into subjects within their remit and examine legislation. Much of the everyday work of the Scottish Parliament is done by these committees.

Committees play a more prominent role in the functioning of the Scottish Parliament than in many other comparable parliamentary systems. Partly this is intended to curb executive dominance, partly to empower backbench members as they carry out the work of scrutinising government, partly to encourage public and expert involvement, and partly due to the unicameral nature of the Scottish Parliament, meaning there is no revising chamber.

Some key committees, known as Mandatory committees, are required by the Scottish Parliament's Standing Orders and are established at the beginning of each session and their remits determined by parliamentary rules. Subject committees deal with a particular subject or area. Many of these Subject committees have been in place in one form or another since the formation of the Scottish Parliament, while others are quickly created and disbanded as circumstances require. A third type of committee may also be established to consider particular issues or pieces of legislation, especially private bills that have been submitted to parliament.

Committees usually have between five and ten MSPs as members, who are selected to reflect the balance of the political parties in parliament as a whole. Committee meetings are held in the committee rooms of the Scottish Parliament Building when parliament is sitting. Committees may also choose to meet at other locations throughout Scotland.

== Conveners Group ==
Composition of Conveners Group by party, excluding the chair

The Conveners Group is not a committee in the ordinary sense, but is a forum where committee conveners meet to discuss the operation of committees and to liaise with other parliamentary bodies. The Conveners Group makes recommendations regarding the scheduling of committee business in the debating chamber and has the authority to allow committee meetings to take place in locations other than the Scottish Parliament Building. The chair of the Conveners Group is formally the Presiding Officer, although in practice they delegate this responsibility to one of their deputies without transferring membership, which the Presiding Officer maintains. The Conveners Group typically meets in private, monthly, unless they are taking evidence from the First Minister. Decisions by the group require consensus from every member that is present, rather than through voting as is the case in ordinary committees.

== Current committees ==
=== Mandatory ===
Mandatory committees are set up under the Scottish Parliament's Standing Orders, which govern their remits and proceedings. Mandatory committees are established at the beginning of each parliamentary session. There are currently seven Mandatory committees.

- Delegated Powers and Law Reform
The role of the Delegated Powers and Law Reform Committee is to decide whether or not to grant powers to Scottish ministers to make secondary legislation. If that power is granted, it is then the job of the Delegated Powers and Law Reform Committee and any relevant Subject committee to examine and report on the secondary legislation as it is issued. The committee is convened by Calum Kerr and the deputy convener is Q Manivannan. The other committee members are Colm Merrick, Amanda Lindsay and Paul Sweeney.
- Equalities, Human Rights and Civil Justice
The Equalities, Human Rights and Civil Justice Committee considers and reports on matters relating to equal opportunities. It also considers human rights matters and the prevention, elimination or regulation of discrimination between persons on the grounds of protected characteristics. The committee convener is Katie Hagmann and Meghan Gallacher is the deputy convener. The other committee members are Collette Stevenson, Fulton MacGregor, Holly Bruce, Amanda Lindsay and Carol Mochan.
- Europe, External Affairs and Culture
The Europe, External Affairs and Culture Committee examines issues relating to culture in Scotland, and scrutinises the Scottish Government's work in this area. The committee's remit includes issues relating to Scotland's links with countries and territories in the European Union and elsewhere. Issues relating to the impact on Scotland of the United Kingdom's withdrawal from the European Union are also considered. Patrick Harvie is the committee convener and Senga Beresford is the deputy convener. The other committee members are Colin Beattie, Keith Brown, Pauline Stafford, Jenny Young and David Green.
- Finance and Public Administration
The Finance and Public Administration Committee scrutinises the Scottish Government's taxation, spending and borrowing plans. It undertakes analysis of tax revenue forecasts and receipts, the impact of any newly devolved financial powers and the estimated costs of proposed legislation. The committee convener is Clare Haughey and Alan Brown is deputy convener. The other committee members Pauline Stafford, Michael Marra, Kim Schmulian, Liam Kerr and Liam McArthur.
- Public Audit
The remit of the Public Audit Committee is to consider and report on any accounts laid before parliament, any report made to parliament by the Auditor General for Scotland, or any other document concerning financial control, accounting and auditing in relation to public expenditure. The committee is convened by Neil Bibby and the deputy convener is Dawn Black. The other committee members are Alan Brown, Miles Briggs and David Kirkwood.
- Public Petitions
The Scottish Parliament’s public petitions process allows members of the public to raise awareness of issues that may not otherwise be debated in parliament. The Public Petitions Committee considers all petitions that meet stipulated guidelines. In addition, the committee aims to improve the way in which the public petitions system functions and also seeks feedback from petitioners about their experiences of petitioning the Scottish Parliament. The committee convener is Paul Sweeney and David Torrance is the deputy convener. The other committee members are Marie McNair, Julie MacDougall and Cara McKee.
- Standards, Procedures and Public Appointments
The Standards, Procedures and Public Appointments Committee examines the rules and procedures that determine how the Scottish Parliament operates. It considers the rules on how MSPs should behave, including what interests they should register, and determines whether MSPs have followed these rules. Other duties include updating the code of conduct for MSPs, scrutinising appointments to public bodies, regulation of lobbying and the operation of elections to the Scottish Parliament. Jenny Minto is the committee convener and Tim Eagle is the deputy convener. The other committee members are David Linden, Mark Simpson and Jackie Baillie.

=== Subject ===
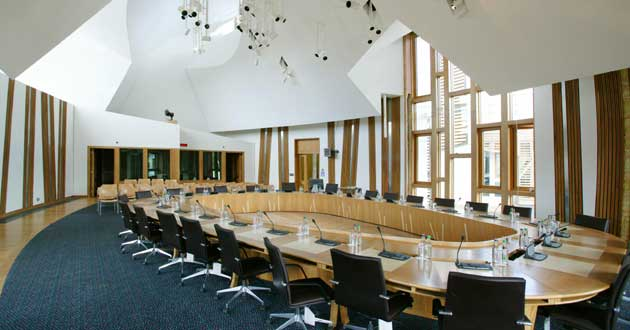
There are six committee rooms in the Scottish Parliament Building

Subject committees are formed at the beginning of each parliamentary session. There are currently nine Subject committees. These committees typically correspond with one (or more) of the directorates or ministries of the Scottish Government. Additional Subject committees can be created as the need arises, such as the COVID-19 Recovery Committee established in 2020 to examine the Scottish Government's response to the COVID-19 pandemic in Scotland.

- Climate Action
The Climate Action Committee considers and reports on matters within the responsibility of the Cabinet Secretary for Climate Action and Rural Affairs, with the exception of rural affairs. The committee is convened by Stuart McMillan and the deputy convener is Ariane Burgess. The other committee members are David Barratt, Martyn Day, Claire Baker, Sanne Dijkstra-Downie and James Adams.
- Criminal Justice
The Criminal Justice Committee considers and reports on matters relating to criminal justice falling within the responsibility of the Cabinet Secretary for Justice, and functions of the Lord Advocate other than as head of the systems of criminal prosecution and investigation of deaths in Scotland. David Linden is the committee convener. The other committee members are Marie McNair, Maggie Chapman, Pauline McNeill, Amanda Bland, Ben Macpherson and Stephen Kerr.
- Economy, Tourism and Energy
The Economy, Tourism and Energy Committee considers and reports on matters relating to the Scottish economy falling within the responsibility of the Cabinet Secretary for Economy, Tourism and Transport, with the exception of transport, on matters relating to public infrastructure, civil contingencies and resilience, and on matters relating to energy and energy consents. The committee is convened by Duncan Massey and the deputy convener is Daniel Johnson. The other committee members are Kate Campbell, Gary Bouse, Martyn Day, Kristopher Leask and Rachael Hamilton.
- Education and Gaelic
The Education and Gaelic Committee considers and reports on matters falling within the responsibility of the Cabinet Secretary for Education, Culture and Gaelic, with the exception of culture, and on matters relating to the Historical Abuse Inquiry, redress and languages. The committee convener is Karen Adam and Katherine Sangster is the deputy convener. The other committee members are George Adam, Patricia Gibson, Duncan Dunlop and Angela Ross.
- Health, Care and Sport
The Health, Care and Sport Committee considers and reports on matters falling within the responsibility of the Cabinet Secretary for Health and Care, and on matters relating to sport. The committee is convened by Helen McDade and the deputy convener is Jack Middleton. The other committee members are Paul McLennan, Heather Anderson, Joe Long, Adam Harley and Kayleigh Kinross-O'Neill.
- Public Service Reform
The Public Service Reform Committee considers and reports on matters within the responsibility of the Cabinet Secretary for Public Service Reform. The committee convener is Bob Doris and the deputy convener is Michelle Campbell. The other committee members are Alex Kerr, Max Bannerman, Lorna Slater, Joe Fagan and Murdo Fraser.
- Rural Affairs
The Rural Affairs Committee considers and reports on matters within the responsibility of the Cabinet Secretary for Climate Action and Rural Affairs, with the exception of climate action. The committee convener is Mark Ruskell and the deputy convener is Andrew Baxter. The other committee members are Laura Mitchell, Emma Roddick, Dawn Black, Jamie Langan and Finlay Carson.
- Social Justice, Housing and Local Government
The Social Justice, Housing and Local Government Committee considers and reports on matters falling within the responsibility of the Cabinet Secretary for Social Justice, Housing and Local Government, and on matters relating to local government within the responsibility of the Cabinet Secretary for Finance and Local Government. Craig Hoy is the committee convener and Thomas Kerr is the deputy convener. The other committee members are Steven Bonnar, Kate Campbell, Gary Bouse, Mark Griffin and Morven-May MacCallum.
- Transport
The Transport Committee considers and reports on matters relating to transport within the responsibility of the Cabinet Secretary for Economy, Tourism and Transport. The committee is convened by Willie Rennie and the deputy convener is Lloyd Melville. The other committee members are Zen Ghani, Collette Stevenson, Iris Duane, Donald MacKinnon and Graham Simpson.

=== Other ===
Issues not within the scope of the Mandatory or Subject committees, especially the examination of private bills, are considered by separate committees created solely for that purpose. Private bills typically relate to bills where the private interests of a person, group or organisation are the main focus of the bill (as opposed to being generally applicable across Scotland).

Such Private bills have been used to legislate for large-scale development projects such as infrastructure projects that require the use of land or property. Such committees have in the past been set up to consider legislation and issues relating to the development of the Edinburgh Trams, the Glasgow Airport rail link, the Airdrie–Bathgate rail link and extensions to the Scottish National Gallery.

Separate committees have also been established to consider Hybrid bills. These are bill that have both a general application in law across Scotland, but also majorly affect the private interests of a specific person, group or organisation.

== Previous committees ==
=== First session ===
- Audit
- Commissioner for Children and Young People (Scotland) Bill
- Education, Culture and Sport
- Enterprise and Lifelong Learning
- Equal Opportunities
- European
- European and External Relations
- Finance
- Health and Community Care
- Justice and Home Affairs
- Justice 1
- Justice 2
- Local Government
- National Galleries of Scotland Bill
- Procedures
- Public Petitions
- Robin Rigg Offshore Wind Farm (Navigation and Fishing) (Scotland) Bill
- Rural Affairs
- Rural Development
- Salmon and Freshwater Fisheries (Consolidation) (Scotland) Bill
- Scottish Parliamentary Standards Commissioner Bill
- Social Inclusion, Housing and Voluntary Sector
- Social Justice
- Standards
- Subordinate Legislation
- Transport and the Environment

=== Second session ===
- Adhoc Standards
- Airdrie-Bathgate Railway and Linked Improvements Bill
- Audit
- Baird Trust Reorganisation Bill
- Communities
- Edinburgh Airport Rail Link Bill
- Edinburgh Tram (Line One) Bill
- Edinburgh Tram (Line Two) Bill
- Education
- Enterprise and Culture
- Environment and Rural Development
- Equal Opportunities
- European and External Relations
- Finance
- Glasgow Airport Rail Link Bill
- Health
- Interests of Members of the Scottish Parliament Bill
- Justice 1
- Justice 2
- Justice 2 Sub
- Local Government and Transport
- Procedures
- Public Petitions
- Standards
- Standards and Public Appointments
- Stirling - Alloa - Kincardine Railway and Linked Improvements Bill
- Subordinate Legislation
- Waverley Railway (Scotland) Bill

=== Third session ===
- Audit
- Economy, Energy and Tourism
- Education, Lifelong Learning and Culture
- End of Life Assistance (Scotland) Bill
- Equal Opportunities
- European and External Relations
- Finance
- Forth Crossing Bill
- Health and Sport
- Justice
- Local Government and Communities
- Procedures
- Public Audit
- Public Petitions
- Review of SPCB Supported Bodies
- Rural Affairs and Environment
- Scotland Bill
- Scottish Parliamentary Pension Bill
- Scottish Parliamentary Pension Scheme
- Standards and Public Appointments
- Standards, Procedures and Public Appointments
- Subordinate Legislation
- Transport, Infrastructure and Climate Change
- Ure Elder Fund Transfer and Dissolution Bill
- William Simpson's Home (Transfer of Property etc.) (Scotland) Bill

=== Fourth session ===
- Burrell Collection (Lending and Borrowing) (Scotland) Bill
- City of Edinburgh Council (Leith Links and Surplus Fire Fund) Bill
- City of Edinburgh Council (Portobello Park) Bill
- Delegated Powers and Law Reform
- Devolution (Further Powers)
- Economy, Energy and Tourism
- Education and Culture
- Equal Opportunities
- European and External Relations
- Finance
- Health and Sport
- Infrastructure and Capital Investment
- Interests of Members of the Scottish Parliament (Amendment) Bill
- Justice
- Justice Sub-Committee on Policing
- Local Government and Regeneration
- National Galleries of Scotland Bill
- National Trust for Scotland (Governance etc.) Bill
- Pentland Hills Regional Park Boundary Bill
- Public Audit
- Public Petitions
- Referendum (Scotland) Bill
- Rural Affairs, Climate Change and Environment
- Scotland Bill
- Standards, Procedures and Public Appointments
- Subordinate Legislation
- Welfare Reform

=== Fifth session ===
- COVID-19
- Scottish Government Handling of Harassment Complaints
- Culture, Tourism, Europe and External Relations
- Delegated Powers and Law Reform
- Economy, Jobs and Fair Work
- Edinburgh Bakers' Widows' Fund Bill
- Education and Skills
- Environment, Climate Change and Land Reform
- Equalities and Human Rights
- Finance and Constitution
- Health and Sport
- Hutchesons' Hospital Transfer and Dissolution (Scotland) Bill
- Justice
- Justice Sub-Committee on Policing
- Local Government and Communities
- Pow of Inchaffray Drainage Commission (Scotland) Bill
- Public Audit and Post-legislative Scrutiny
- Public Petitions
- Rural Economy and Connectivity
- Social Security
- Solicitors in the Supreme Courts of Scotland (Amendment) Bill
- Standards, Procedures and Public Appointments
- Writers to the Signet Dependants' Annuity Fund Amendment (Scotland) Bill

=== Sixth Session ===
The 6th Scottish Parliament had 7 Mandatory committees (M) and 11 Subject committees (S).

- Citizen Participation and Public Petitions Committee (M)
- Constitution, Europe, External Affairs and Culture Committee (M)
- COVID-19 Recovery Committee (S) from 15th June 2021 to 14th July 2023
- Criminal Justice Committee (S)
- Delegated Powers and Law Reform Committee (M)
- Economy and Fair Work Committee (S)
- Education, Children and Young People Committee (S)
- Equalities, Human Rights and Civil Justice Committee (M)
- Finance and Public Administration Committee (M)
- Health, Social Care and Sport Committee (S)
- Local Government, Housing and Planning Committee (S)
- Net Zero, Energy and Transport Committee (S)
- Public Audit Committee (M)
- Rural Affairs and Islands Committee (S) after 1st February 2023
- Rural Affairs, Islands and Natural Environment Committee (S) before 1st February 2023
- Social Justice and Social Security Committee (S)
- SPCB Supported Bodies Landscape Review Committee (S) from 5th December 2024 to 30th September 2025
- Standards, Procedures and Public Appointments Committee (M)

== See also ==
- Scottish Government
- Scottish Parliament
- Member of the Scottish Parliament
