= South Scotland (Scottish Parliament electoral region) =

Region or constituency of the Scottish Parliament

- electoral region for the Scottish Parliament
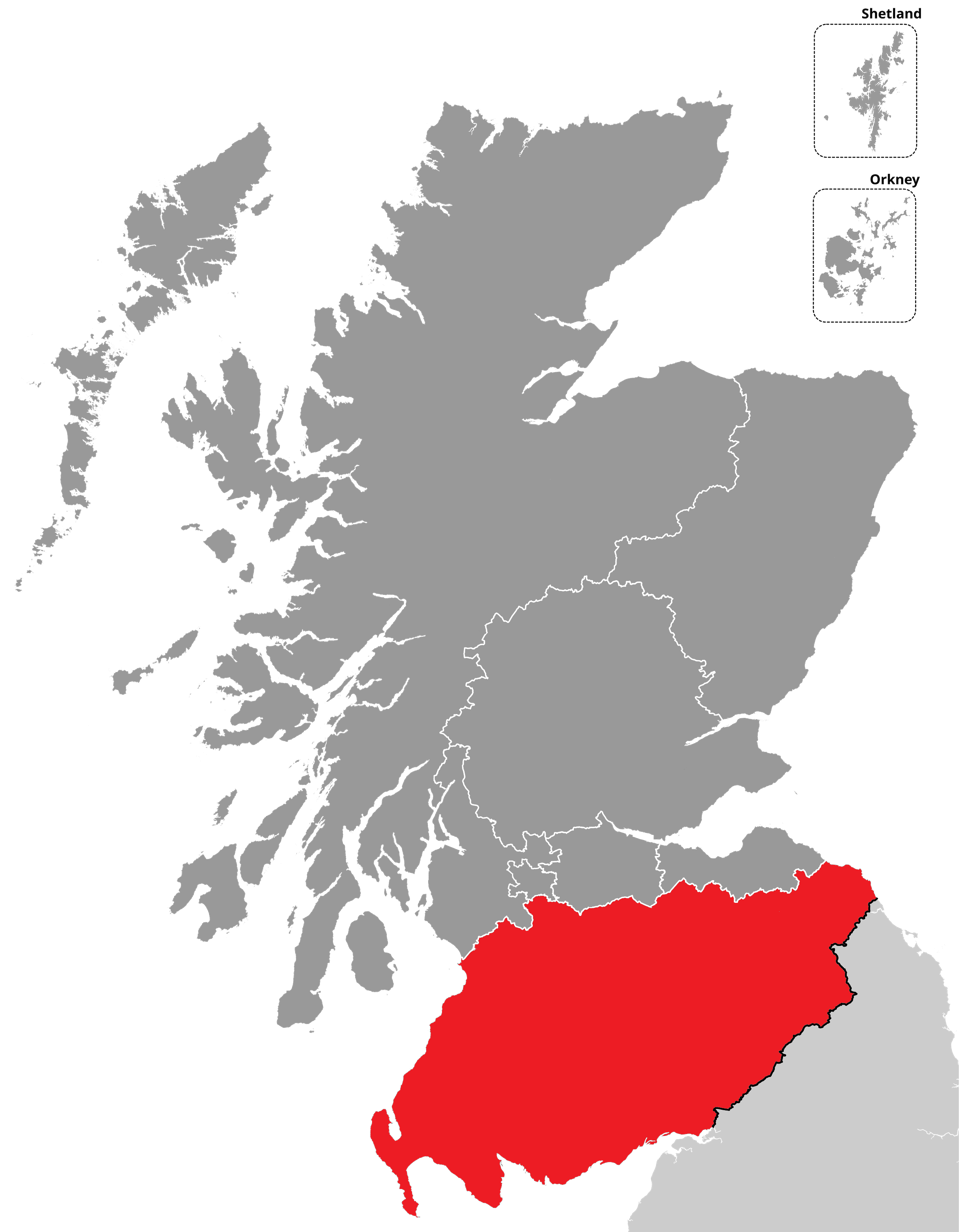
- South Scotland shown within Scotland
- Electorate: 594,925 (2022)

Current electoral region
- Created: 2011
- MSPs: Scottish National Party 7 Conservatives 3 Reform 3 Labour 2 Green 1 Liberal Democrat 1
- Council areas: Dumfries and Galloway; East Ayrshire (part); Midlothian (part); Scottish Borders; South Ayrshire; South Lanarkshire (part)
- Constituencies: Ayr; Carrick, Cumnock and Doon Valley; Clydesdale; Dumfriesshire; East Kilbride; Ettrick, Roxburgh and Berwickshire; Galloway and West Dumfries; Hamilton, Larkhall and Stonehouse; Kilmarnock and Irvine Valley; Midlothian South, Tweeddale and Lauderdale

South Scotland is one of the eight electoral regions of the Scottish Parliament. Ten of the parliament's 73 first past the post constituencies are sub-divisions of the region. Under the additional-member electoral system used for elections to the Scottish Parliament, the region elects seven regional Members of the Scottish Parliament (MSPs), in addition to the ten constituency MSPs, to produce a form of proportional representation for the region as a whole, which thus elects a total of 17 MSPs.

The region was created as a result of the First Periodic Review of Scottish Parliament Boundaries in 2011, and largely replaced the South of Scotland region. As defined at the 2011 review, the South Scotland region covered the Dumfries and Galloway, East Ayrshire, Scottish Borders and South Ayrshire council areas in full and parts of the East Lothian, Midlothian and South Lanarkshire council areas, and covered nine constituencies. Following the second periodic review of Scottish Parliament boundaries in 2025, the boundaries of the region were altered, and it now covers ten constituencies. The region now covers the whole of the council areas of Dumfries and Galloway, Scottish Borders, and South Ayrshire; and parts of the council areas of East Ayrshire, Midlothian, and South Lanarkshire. By population it is now the largest of Scotland's eight electoral regions.

== Constituencies and local government areas ==
=== 2026–present ===
As a result of the Second Periodic Review in 2025, the boundaries for the region and constituencies were redrawn for the 2026 Scottish Parliament election. South Scotland underwent considerable changes, with East Lothian being transferred to the new Edinburgh and Lothians East region, and the region gaining the East Kilbride and Hamilton, Larkhall and Stonehouse constituencies from the former Central Scotland region. Additionally, the region lost a small portion of the East Ayrshire council area to the West Scotland region due to a boundary changes of the Kilmarnock and Irvine Valley constituency.

Region	Constituencies from 2026
	1. Ayr; 2. Carrick, Cumnock and Doon Valley; 3. Clydesdale; 4. Dumfriesshire; 5. East Kilbride; 6. Ettrick, Roxburgh and Berwickshire; 7. Galloway and West Dumfries; 8. Hamilton, Larkhall and Stonehouse; 9. Kilmarnock and Irvine Valley; 10. Midlothian South, Tweeddale and Lauderdale

=== 2011–2026 ===
Map of boundaries from 2011

As a result of the First Periodic Review of Scottish Parliament Boundaries the boundaries for the region and constituencies were redrawn for the 2011 Scottish Parliament election.

Region	Constituencies
	1. Ayr; 2. Carrick, Cumnock and Doon Valley; 3. Clydesdale; 4. Kilmarnock and Irvine Valley; 5. Dumfriesshire; 6. East Lothian; 7. Galloway and West Dumfries; 8. Ettrick, Roxburgh and Berwickshire; 9. Midlothian South, Tweeddale and Lauderdale

=== 1999–2011 ===
Prior to the First Periodic Review of Scottish Parliament Boundaries, the area which previously encompassed much of the South Scotland electoral region was known as the 'South of Scotland' electoral region. The constituencies were created in 1999 with the names and boundaries of Westminster constituencies, as existing in at that time.

The First Past the Post constituencies can be found below:

Region	Constituencies
	1. Ayr; 2. Carrick, Cumnock and Doon Valley; 3. Clydesdale; 4. Cunninghame South; 5. Dumfries; 6. East Lothian; 7. Galloway and Upper Nithsdale; 8. Roxburgh and Berwickshire; 9. Tweeddale, Ettrick and Lauderdale

The region covered the following local government areas: In full:

- Scottish Borders
- South Ayrshire
- Dumfries and Galloway

In part:

- East Ayrshire
- East Lothian
- Midlothian
- North Ayrshire
- South Lanarkshire

== Members of the Scottish Parliament ==
=== Constituency MSPs ===
as South of Scotland
Term	Election	Ayr	Carrick, Cumnock and Doon Valley	Clydesdale	Galloway and Upper Nithsdale	Dumfries	Roxburgh and Berwickshire	Tweeddale, Ettrick and Lauderdale	East Lothian	area formerly within the Central Scotland Region prior to 2011	Cunninghame South
1st	1999	Ian Welsh (Labour)	Cathy Jamieson (Labour)	Karen Gillon (Labour)	Alasdair Morgan (SNP)	Elaine Murray (Labour)	Euan Robson (Lib Dem)	Ian Jenkins (Lib Dem)	John Home Robertson (Labour)	area formerly within the Central Scotland Region prior to 2011	Irene Oldfather (Labour)
1st	2000 by	John Scott (Conservative)	Cathy Jamieson (Labour)	Karen Gillon (Labour)	Alasdair Morgan (SNP)	Elaine Murray (Labour)	Euan Robson (Lib Dem)	Ian Jenkins (Lib Dem)	John Home Robertson (Labour)	area formerly within the Central Scotland Region prior to 2011	Irene Oldfather (Labour)
2nd	2003	John Scott (Conservative)	Cathy Jamieson (Labour)	Karen Gillon (Labour)	Alex Fergusson (Conservative)	Elaine Murray (Labour)	Euan Robson (Lib Dem)	Jeremy Purvis (LD)	John Home Robertson (Labour)	area formerly within the Central Scotland Region prior to 2011	Irene Oldfather (Labour)
3rd	2007	John Scott (Conservative)	Cathy Jamieson (Labour)	Karen Gillon (Labour)	Alex Fergusson (Conservative)	Elaine Murray (Labour)	John Lamont (Conservative)	Jeremy Purvis (LD)	Iain Gray (Labour)	area formerly within the Central Scotland Region prior to 2011	Irene Oldfather (Labour)
as South Scotland
Term	Election	Ayr	Carrick, Cumnock and Doon Valley	Clydesdale	Galloway and West Dumfries	Dumfriesshire	Ettrick, Roxburgh and Berwickshire	Midlothian South, Tweeddale and Lauderdale	East Lothian	Kilmarnock and Irvine Valley	area covered by former constituency moved to the West Scotland Region from 2011
4th	2011	John Scott (Conservative)	Adam Ingram (SNP)	Aileen Campbell (SNP)	Alex Fergusson (Conservative)	Elaine Murray (Labour)	John Lamont (Conservative)	Christine Grahame (SNP)	Iain Gray (Labour)	Willie Coffey (SNP)	area covered by former constituency moved to the West Scotland Region from 2011
5th	2016	John Scott (Conservative)	Jeane Freeman (SNP)	Aileen Campbell (SNP)	Finlay Carson (Conservative)	Oliver Mundell (Conservative)	John Lamont (Conservative)	Christine Grahame (SNP)	Iain Gray (Labour)	Willie Coffey (SNP)	area covered by former constituency moved to the West Scotland Region from 2011
5th	2017 by	John Scott (Conservative)	Jeane Freeman (SNP)	Aileen Campbell (SNP)	Finlay Carson (Conservative)	Oliver Mundell (Conservative)	Rachael Hamilton (Conservative)	Christine Grahame (SNP)	Iain Gray (Labour)	Willie Coffey (SNP)	area covered by former constituency moved to the West Scotland Region from 2011
6th	2021	Siobhian Brown (SNP)	Elena Whitham (SNP)	Màiri McAllan (SNP)	Finlay Carson (Conservative)	Oliver Mundell (Conservative)	Rachael Hamilton (Conservative)	Christine Grahame (SNP)	Paul McLennan (SNP)	Willie Coffey (SNP)	area covered by former constituency moved to the West Scotland Region from 2011
Term	Election	Ayr	Carrick, Cumnock and Doon Valley	Clydesdale	Galloway and West Dumfries	Dumfriesshire	Ettrick, Roxburgh and Berwickshire	Midlothian South, Tweeddale and Lauderdale	East Kilbride	Kilmarnock and Irvine Valley	Hamilton, Larkhall and Stonehouse
7th	2026	Siobhian Brown (SNP)	Katie Hagmann (SNP)	Màiri McAllan (SNP)	Finlay Carson (Conservative)	Craig Hoy (Conservative)	Rachael Hamilton (Conservative)	Calum Kerr (SNP)	Collette Stevenson (SNP)	Alan Brown (SNP)	Alex Kerr (SNP)

=== Regional List MSPs ===
N.B. This table is for presentation purposes only

Parliament	MSP	MSP	MSP	MSP	MSP	MSP	MSP
as South of Scotland
1st (1999–2003)	Christine Grahame (SNP)	Adam Ingram (SNP)	Michael Russell (SNP)	Murray Tosh (Conservative)	Alex Fergusson (Conservative)	David Mundell (Conservative)	Phil Gallie (Conservative)
2nd (2003–07)	Christine Grahame (SNP)	Adam Ingram (SNP)	Alasdair Morgan (SNP)	Rosemary Byrne (Socialist later Solidarity)	Chris Ballance (Green)	David Mundell (Conservative)	Phil Gallie (Conservative)
2nd (2003–07)	Christine Grahame (SNP)	Adam Ingram (SNP)	Alasdair Morgan (SNP)	Rosemary Byrne (Socialist later Solidarity)	Chris Ballance (Green)	Derek Brownlee (Conservative)	Phil Gallie (Conservative)
3rd (2007–11)	Christine Grahame (SNP)	Adam Ingram (SNP)	Alasdair Morgan (SNP)	Michael Russell (SNP)	Aileen Campbell (SNP)	Derek Brownlee (Conservative)	Jim Hume (Lib Dem)
as South Scotland
4th (2011–16)	Aileen McLeod (SNP)	Joan McAlpine (SNP)	Paul Wheelhouse (SNP)	Chic Brodie (SNP)	Claudia Beamish (Labour)	Graeme Pearson (Labour)	Jim Hume (Lib Dem)
5th (2016–2021)	Emma Harper (SNP)	Joan McAlpine (SNP)	Paul Wheelhouse (SNP)	Rachael Hamilton (Conservative)	Claudia Beamish (Labour)	Colin Smyth (Labour)	Brian Whittle (Conservative)
5th (2016–2021)	Emma Harper (SNP)	Joan McAlpine (SNP)	Paul Wheelhouse (SNP)	Michelle Ballantyne (Conservative, then Reform)	Claudia Beamish (Labour)	Colin Smyth (Labour)	Brian Whittle (Conservative)
6th (2021–2026)	Emma Harper (SNP)	Martin Whitfield (Labour)	Sharon Dowey (Conservative)	Craig Hoy (Conservative)	Carol Mochan (Labour)	Colin Smyth (Labour)	Brian Whittle (Conservative)
7th (2026–)	Laura Moodie (Green)	Jamie Langan (Reform)	David Kirkwood (Reform)	Senga Beresford (Reform)	Carol Mochan (Labour)	Joe Fagan (Labour)	Duncan Dunlop (Lib Dem)

== Election results ==
=== 2026 Scottish Parliament election ===
==== Constituency results ====
2026 Scottish Parliament election: South Scotland
Constituency	Elected member	Result
Ayr	Siobhian Brown	SNP hold
Carrick, Cumnock and Doon Valley	Katie Hagmann	SNP hold
Clydesdale	Màiri McAllan	SNP hold
Dumfriesshire	Craig Hoy	Conservative hold
East Kilbride	Collette Stevenson	SNP hold
Ettrick, Roxburgh and Berwickshire	Rachael Hamilton	Conservative hold
Galloway and West Dumfries	Finlay Carson	Conservative hold
Hamilton, Larkhall and Stonehouse	Alex Kerr	SNP gain from Labour
Kilmarnock and Irvine Valley	Alan Brown	SNP hold
Midlothian South, Tweeddale and Lauderdale	Calum Kerr	SNP hold

==== Additional Member results ====
2026 Scottish Parliament election: South Scotland
List	Candidates	Votes	Of total (%)	± from prev.
SNP	Màiri McAllan, Alan Brown, Emma Harper, Siobhian Brown, Katie Hagmann, John Redpath, Collette Stevenson, Stephen Thompson, Alex Kerr, Allan Dorans, Kirsty Campbell, Ross Clark	86,446	26.8	−12.3
Reform	Jamie Langan, David Kirkwood, Senga Beresford, Dr Tim Kelly, Carolyn Grant, Dan Clarke, John McNamee, Andrew Fleming Russell, Andrew Scott, Anne Millar	61,346	19.0	+18.8
Conservative	Rachael Hamilton, Craig Hoy, Finlay Carson, Sharon Dowey, Brian Whittle, Keith Cockburn, Julie Pirone, James Adams, Tracey Clark	60,726	18.8	−12.9
Labour	Carol Mochan, Joe Fagan, Linda Dorward, Ewan MacPhee, Lynsey Hamilton, Daniel Coleman, Kaymarie Hughes, Davy Russell, Brian McGinley, Jack McConnel	52,314	16.2	−0.1
Green	Laura Moodie, Ann McGuinness, Dominic Ashmole, Neil Mackinnon, Barbra Harvie, Cameron Garrett, Tim Clancey, Tom Kerr, Korin Matthew Vallance	31,170	9.7	+4.6
Liberal Democrats	Duncan Dunlop, Ray Georgeson, Aisha Mir, Richard John Brodie, Charlotte Sureyya Sayre Olcay, Michael Gregori, Tracey Warman	17,999	5.6	+2.4
Independent Green Voice	Maxwell Morrison Dunbar	2,908	0.9	+0.4
AtLS	Terry Howson, Gary Campbell McClay, Yvonne Lazenbury, Maureen Johnston, Marjorie Ellis Thompson	2,766	0.9	N/A
Scottish Family	Gareth Kirk, Hamish Neil Goldie-Scot, Laura Jane Shell, Josh-Lee James Witherspoon	2,400	0.7	+0.2
Scottish Socialist	Mark Sands, Zoë Greenan, Alex Creel	928	0.3	N/A
Independent	Denise Sommerville	903	0.3	N/A
Independent	Sean Davis	603	0.2	N/A
UKIP	Janice Mackay, Laurie James Steele, Robert Bilcliff, Gail Bilcliff, Colin Sullivan	486	0.2	±0.0
Heritage	David Philip Griffiths, Gisele Skinner, Elspeth Margaret Lindsay Griffiths, Charles David McEwan	471	0.1	N/A
Alliance for Democracy and Freedom	David Ballantine, Glen Maney	448	0.1	N/A
Scottish Common Party	Paul Adkins, Muhammad Tufail	370	0.1	N/A
Scottish Libertarian	Daniel Fraser	278	0.1	N/A

=== 2021 Scottish Parliament election ===
In the 2021 Scottish Parliament election the region elected MSPs as follows:

- 7 Scottish National Party MSPs (6 constituency members and 1 additional member)
- 3 Labour MSPs (additional members)
- 6 Conservative MSPs (3 constituency members and 3 additional member)

==== Constituency results ====
2021 Scottish Parliament election: South Scotland
Constituency	Elected member	Result
Ayr	Siobhian Brown	SNP gain from Conservative
Carrick, Cumnock and Doon Valley	Elena Whitham	SNP hold
Clydesdale	Màiri McAllan	SNP hold
Dumfriesshire	Oliver Mundell	Conservative hold
East Lothian	Paul McLennan	SNP gain from Labour
Ettrick, Roxburgh and Berwickshire	Rachael Hamilton	Conservative hold
Galloway and West Dumfries	Finlay Carson	Conservative hold
Kilmarnock and Irvine Valley	Willie Coffey	SNP hold
Midlothian South, Tweeddale and Lauderdale	Christine Grahame	SNP hold

==== Additional Member results ====
2021 Scottish Parliament election: South Scotland
List	Candidates	Votes	Of total (%)	± from prev.
SNP	Emma Harper, Joan McAlpine, Paul Wheelhouse, Màiri McAllan, Richard Walker, Heather Anderson, Siobhian Brown, Stacy Bradley, Paul McLennan, Ali Salamati, Stephen Thompson, Laura Brennan-Whitefield	136,741	37.6	▼0.7
Conservative	Oliver Mundell, Rachael Hamilton, Craig Hoy, Brian Whittle, Sharon Dowey, Shona Haslam, Finlay Carson, Scott Hamilton, Alex Allison, Eric Holford, Alexandra Herdman, John Denerley	121,730	33.5	▲1.4
Labour	Colin Smyth, Carol Mochan, Martin Whitfield, Claudia Beamish, Kevin McGregor, Katherine Sangster, Ian Davidson	57,236	15.7	▼2.1
Green	Laura Moodie, Barbra Harvie, Dominic Ashmole, Katherine Malone, Charles Strang, Ciara Campbell, Peter Barlow, James Puchowski, Tristan Gray	18,964	5.2	▲0.5
Liberal Democrats	Catriona Bhatia, Jenny Marr	12,422	3.4	▼0.3
All for Unity	George Galloway, Jamie Blackett, Dr Bruce Halliday, Jim Grindlay, Kirsteen Michell, Elspeth Grindlay, Malcolm MacDonald	5,521	1.5	▲1.5
Alba	Cynthia Guthrie, Corri Wilson, Suzanne Blackley, Laurie Flynn	3,896	1.1	▲1.1
Independent Green Voice	Maxwell Dunbar	1,690	0.5	▲0.5
Scottish Family	Charles McEwan, Dorothy Yost, Sophie Hendry, Theresa Gavin, Elizabeth Fabisiak	1,659	0.5	▲0.5
Abolish the Scottish Parliament	John Ferguson, Simon Bellord	1,126	0.3	▲0.3
Reform	Michelle Ballantyne, David Kirkwood, James Corbett, William Luke	779	0.2	▲0.2
Freedom Alliance	Mandy Blackman, Amanda McConechy, Gillian Jamieson, Joy Rivett-Gill	686	0.2	▲0.2
UKIP	Richard Elvin, Julia Searle, Patricia Mountain, Patricia Bryant, Nick Hollis, David Blaymires	578	0.2	▼2.0
Scottish Libertarian	Stef Johnstone	534	0.1	▲0.1
Scotia Future	Chic Brodie	194	0.1	▲0.1
Vanguard	Michael Banks	92	0.0	0.0

=== 2016 Scottish Parliament election ===
In the 2016 Scottish Parliament election the region elected MSPs as follows:

- 7 Scottish National Party MSPs (four constituency members and three additional members)
- 6 Conservative MSPs (four constituency members and two additional members)
- 3 Labour MSPs (one constituency member and two additional members)

==== Constituency results ====
2016 Scottish Parliament election: South Scotland
Constituency	Elected member	Result
Ayr	John Scott	Conservative hold
Carrick, Cumnock and Doon Valley	Jeane Freeman	SNP hold
Clydesdale	Aileen Campbell	SNP hold
Dumfriesshire	Oliver Mundell	Conservative gain from Labour
East Lothian	Iain Gray	Labour hold
Ettrick, Roxburgh and Berwickshire	John Lamont	Conservative hold
Galloway and West Dumfries	Finlay Carson	Conservative hold
Kilmarnock and Irvine Valley	Willie Coffey	SNP hold
Midlothian South, Tweeddale and Lauderdale	Christine Grahame	SNP hold

==== Additional member results ====
2016 Scottish Parliament election: South Scotland
Party	Elected candidates	Seats	+/−	Votes	%	+/−%
SNP	Joan McAlpine; Paul Wheelhouse; Emma Harper	3	-1	120,217	38.3	-2.7
Conservative	Rachael Hamilton; Brian Whittle	2	+2	100,753	32.1	+12.6
Labour	Claudia Beamish; Colin Smyth	2	±0	56,072	17.8	-7.5
Green		0	±0	14,773	4.7	+1.6
Liberal Democrats		0	-1	11,775	3.7	-1.7
UKIP		0	±0	6,726	2.1	+1.0
Clydesdale and South Scotland Independent		0	±0	1,485	0.5	N/A
Solidarity		0	±0	1,294	0.4	+0.1
RISE		0	±0	1,097	0.3	N/A

=== 2011 Scottish Parliament election ===
In the 2011 Scottish Parliament election the region elected MSPs as follows:

- 8 Scottish National Party MSPs (four constituency members and four additional members)
- 4 Labour MSPs (two constituency members and two additional members)
- 3 Conservative MSPs (all constituency members)
- 1 Liberal Democrat MSP (additional member)

==== Constituency results ====
2011 Scottish Parliament election: South Scotland
Constituency	Elected member	Result
Ayr	John Scott	Conservative hold
Carrick, Cumnock and Doon Valley	Adam Ingram	SNP gain from Labour
Clydesdale	Aileen Campbell	SNP gain from Labour
Dumfriesshire	Elaine Murray	Labour gain from Conservative
East Lothian	Iain Gray	Labour hold
Ettrick, Roxburgh and Berwickshire	John Lamont	Conservative hold
Galloway and West Dumfries	Alex Fergusson	Conservative hold
Kilmarnock and Irvine Valley	Willie Coffey	SNP hold
Midlothian South, Tweeddale and Lauderdale	Christine Grahame	SNP hold

==== Additional member results ====
2011 Scottish Parliament election: South Scotland
Party	Elected candidates	Seats	+/−	Votes	%	+/−%
SNP	Joan McAlpine; Aileen McLeod; Paul Wheelhouse; Chic Brodie	4	-1	114,270	41.0	+12.4
Labour	Claudia Beamish; Graeme Pearson	2	+2	70,596	25.3	-3.5
Conservative		0	-1	54,352	19.5	-2.8
Liberal Democrats	Jim Hume	1	±0	15,096	5.4	-4.5
Green		0	±0	8,656	3.1	-0.3
Scottish Senior Citizens		0	±0	4,418	1.6	-0.4
UKIP		0	±0	3,343	1.2	+0.6
Socialist Labour		0	±0	2,906	1.0	+0.5
BNP		0	±0	2,017	0.7	-0.4
Scottish Christian		0	±0	1,924	0.7	-0.1
Solidarity		0	±0	813	0.3	-0.7
Scottish Socialist		0	±0	697	0.2	-0.2
