= Twynholm =

Coordinates: 54°51′53″N 4°05′00″W

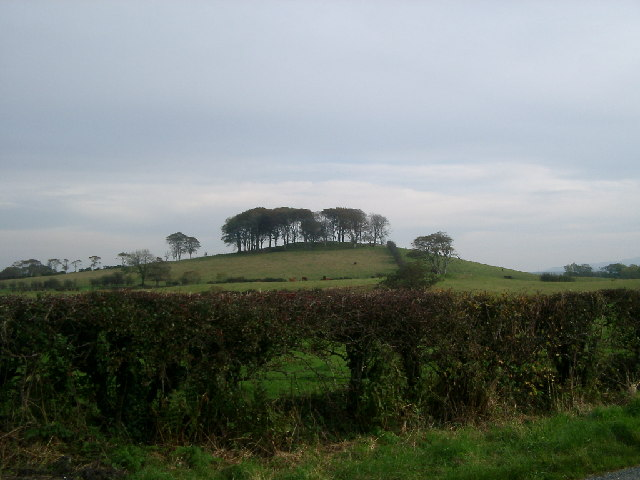
- A hill fort west of Twynholm

- Location within Dumfries and Galloway
- Population: 119 (2001 Census)
- OS grid reference: NX6654
- Council area: Dumfries and Galloway
- Lieutenancy area: Kirkcudbrightshire
- Country: Scotland
- Sovereign state: United Kingdom
- Post town: Kirkcudbright
- Postcode district: DG6
- Dialling code: 01557
- Police: Scotland
- Fire: Scottish
- Ambulance: Scottish
- UK Parliament: Dumfries and Galloway
- Scottish Parliament: Galloway and West Dumfries

Twynholm (/ˈtwaɪnəm/) is a village in Scotland. It is located 2 1/4 miles (3.6 km) north-northwest of Kirkcudbright and 4 1/2 miles (7.2 km) east of Gatehouse of Fleet on the main A75 trunk road. It is in the historic county of Kirkcudbrightshire , Dumfries and Galloway.

The etymology of the name is uncertain. It may be from the British twyn (a bank or hillock) and the West Germanic hame meaning home, or be of Scots derivation and mean "between the river banks".

== History ==
The village was founded in the 16th century when two mills were set up on the burn which passes through the village centre. In the 18th century, the first school was built in the village, with the current primary school built in 1911. Twynholm was a parish from medieval times until 1975, including the neighbouring parish of Kirkchrist from 1654.

In 1887, John Bartholomew's Gazetteer of the British Isles described Twynholm like this:

Twynholm, par. and vil., Kirkcudbrightshire - par., 10,484 ac., pop. 681; vil., 3 miles NW. of Kirkcudbright; P.O.

— John Bartholomew, Gazetteer of the British Isles (1887)

There are a variety of listed buildings in the vicinity including the ruins of the 16th century Cumstoun Castle, and the parish church. The church was constructed in 1818 and was restored and the roof replaced in 1914. In 1963, a church porch was added.

== Notable residents ==
- Finlay Carson (born 1967), Member of the Scottish Parliament (MSP) for the Galloway and West Dumfries constituency since the 2016 Scottish Parliament election, born, raised and lives in Twynholm
- David Coulthard (born 1971), former Formula One racing driver, is from Twynholm.
- Thomas Johnstone Carlyle Gifford (14 January 1881 – 24 January 1975)
- Sara Maitland, born 1950, daughter of Adam Maitland of Cumstoun House. (a descendant of the judge Thomas Maitland, Lord Dundrennan ). She is a British writer of religious fantasy. A novelist, she is also known for her short stories. Her work has a magic realist tendency.

== See also ==
- List of places in Dumfries and Galloway
