= Senga Beresford =

Scottish politician

Senga Beresford MSP
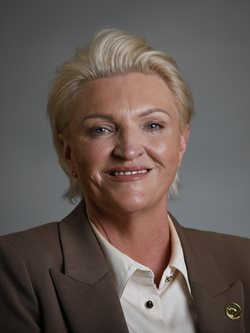
- Official portrait, 2026

Member of the Scottish Parliament for South Scotland (1 of 7 Regional MSPs)
- Incumbent
- Assumed office 7 May 2026

Personal details
- Party: Reform UK

Senga Beresford is a Reform UK Scotland politician who has served as a Member of the Scottish Parliament (MSP) for the South Scotland region since May 2026.

== Political career ==
=== Member of the Scottish Parliament ===
At the 2026 Scottish Parliament election, Beresford stood as Reform UK's constituency candidate for Galloway and West Dumfries, as well as being placed third on the party list for the South Scotland region. On the constituency vote, Beresford received 4,674 votes (15.6%), and finished third behind Finlay Carson and Emma Harper. She was instead elected as one of the seven regional MSPs for South Scotland.

=== Controversies ===
During the 2026 election campaign, ITV Border reported that Beresford had made public posts on X in 2024, including replies to content about deporting Muslims from the United Kingdom and posts concerning Tommy Robinson and Enoch Powell. A Reform UK source told ITV Border that the party did not believe Beresford still held those views, while Reform UK Scotland leader Malcolm Offord said the comments had been made before she joined the party and described them as "intemperate language".
