= List of listed buildings in Twynholm, Dumfries and Galloway =

This is a list of listed buildings in the civil parish of Twynholm in Dumfries and Galloway, Scotland.

== List ==
Name	Location	Date Listed	Grid Ref. (Note: Sometimes known as OSGB36, the grid reference (where provided) is based on the British national grid reference system used by the Ordnance Survey. • "Guide to National Grid". Ordnance Survey. • "Get-a-map". Ordnance Survey.)	Geo-coordinates	Notes	LB Number (Note: Historic Environment Scotland assign a unique alphanumeric identifier to each designated site in Scotland, for listed buildings this always begins with "LB", for example "LB12345".)	Image
Kempleton Farmhouse				54°52′02″N 4°03′25″W	Category C(S)	16985	Upload Photo
Cumstoun Lodge And Gatepiers				54°51′49″N 4°03′07″W	Category C(S)	16984	Upload Photo
Twynholm Village, Kirkburn				54°51′58″N 4°04′53″W	Category B	16987	Upload Photo
Barwhinnock House				54°52′18″N 4°05′41″W	Category A	16989	Upload Photo
Cumstoun House				54°51′26″N 4°03′10″W	Category A	16993	Upload Photo
Twynholm Parish Church, (Church Of Scotland), And Graveyard				54°51′53″N 4°04′58″W	Category B	16986	Upload Photo
Cumstoun Castle				54°51′24″N 4°03′16″W	Category C(S)	16992	Upload Photo
Barwhinnock Lodge, And Gatepiers				54°52′06″N 4°05′41″W	Category B	16990	Upload Photo
Cumstoun Dovecot				54°51′29″N 4°03′20″W	Category B	16988	Upload Photo
Cumstoun, Garden House And Walled Garden				54°51′34″N 4°03′05″W	Category B	16983	Upload Photo
Barwhinnock Walled Garden				54°52′11″N 4°05′44″W	Category B	16991	Upload Photo

== Key ==
The scheme for classifying buildings in Scotland is:

- Category A: "buildings of national or international importance, either architectural or historic; or fine, little-altered examples of some particular period, style or building type."
- Category B: "buildings of regional or more than local importance; or major examples of some particular period, style or building type, which may have been altered."
- Category C: "buildings of local importance; lesser examples of any period, style, or building type, as originally constructed or moderately altered; and simple traditional buildings which group well with other listed buildings."

In March 2016 there were 47,288 listed buildings in Scotland. Of these, 8% were Category A, and 50% were Category B, with the remaining 42% being Category C.
