= Aileen McLeod =

Scottish politician (born 1971)

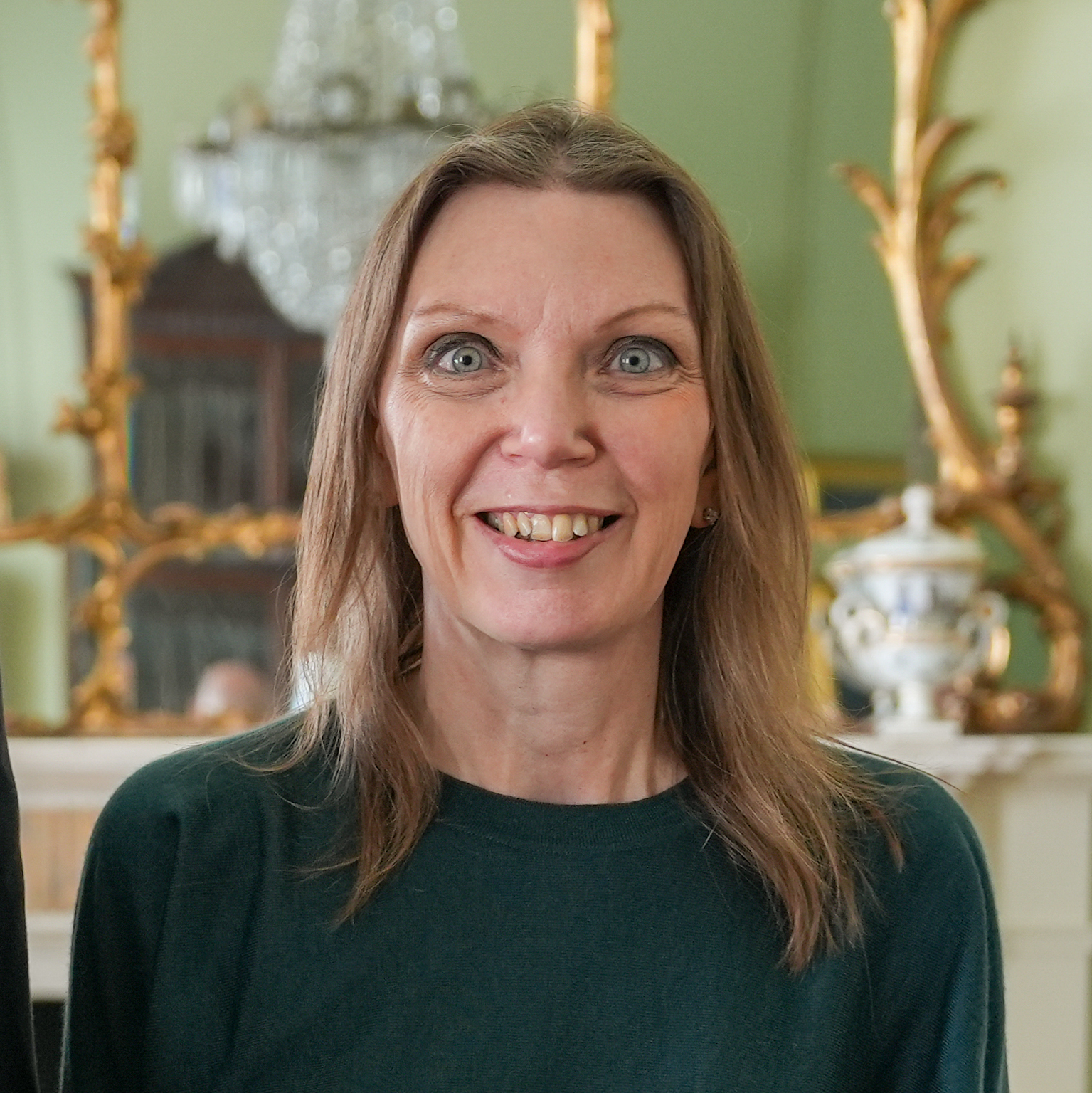
- McLeod in 2025

Member of the European Parliament for Scotland
- In office 2 July 2019 – 31 January 2020
- Preceded by: David Martin
- Succeeded by: Constituency abolished

Minister for Environment, Climate Change and Land Reform
- In office 21 November 2014 – 18 May 2016
- First Minister: Nicola Sturgeon
- Preceded by: Paul Wheelhouse
- Succeeded by: Roseanna Cunningham

Member of the Scottish Parliament for South Scotland (1 of 7 Regional MSPs)
- In office 5 May 2011 – 24 March 2016

Personal details
- Born: 24 August 1971 (age 54) East Kilbride, South Lanarkshire, Scotland
- Party: Scottish National Party
- Education: University of Edinburgh; University of Central Lancashire

Aileen McLeod (born 24 August 1971) is a Scottish National Party (SNP) politician. She is a former Member of the European Parliament (MEP) for the Scotland constituency, having been elected in the 2019 European Parliament election. She served as MEP until the 31 January 2020 when the Brexit process was completed.

She was also formerly a Member of the Scottish Parliament (MSP) for the South Scotland region 2011−2016 and was the Minister for Environment, Climate Change and Land Reform 2014−2016.

== Early life and education ==
McLeod was born on 24 August 1971 in East Kilbride, Scotland. She attended Claremont High School going on to study at the University of Edinburgh, graduating in 1993 with a degree in German and European Community studies. In 2004 she graduated with a PhD from the University of Central Lancashire.

== Political career ==
McLeod joined the SNP in 2004 after leaving her restricted post in the Scottish Parliament. After spending five years living in Brussels and working as Head of Policy for Alyn Smith MEP, McLeod returned to Scotland in 2009 to stand as an SNP candidate in the European Parliamentary elections. From 2009 to 2011 McLeod was Parliamentary Assistant to Michael Russell MSP.

In 2011 McLeod was elected to the Scottish Parliament via the South Scotland regional list after losing in the constituency of Galloway and West Dumfries to Alex Fergusson.

On 21 November 2014, she was appointed Minister for Environment, Climate Change and Land Reform, succeeding Paul Wheelhouse who was moved to another ministerial brief. She attended the 2015 United Nations Climate Change Conference in Paris. She had looked at issues relating to land ownership, with some efforts made to increase transparency of this.

In the 2016 Scottish Parliament election she again stood as a candidate in the Galloway and West Dumfries constituency where she finished second behind Finlay Carson (who had a majority of 1,514 votes) and was not returned to the Parliament as a result. She was succeeded as Cabinet Secretary for Environment, Climate Change and Land Reform by Roseanna Cunningham.

=== European Parliament ===
McLeod was elected as a Member of the European Parliament for the Scotland constituency in the 2019 European Parliament election. In September 2019 McLeod was a member of the European Parliament's delegation to the 2019 UN Climate Action Summit She served as MEP until 31 January 2020, when the Brexit process was completed.

== Post Brexit ==
In 2021 she and Ricardo Borges de Castro joined the European Policy Centre. She was to work for Fabian Zuleeg looking particularly at health. ropean Policy Centre as associate directors.

In 2024 she took a temporary job leading a charity called Wellbeing Economy Alliance Scotland for six months replacing Jimmy Paul. In August 2025 she was still with that charity.
