= Laura Moodie =

Scottish politician

Laura Moodie MSP
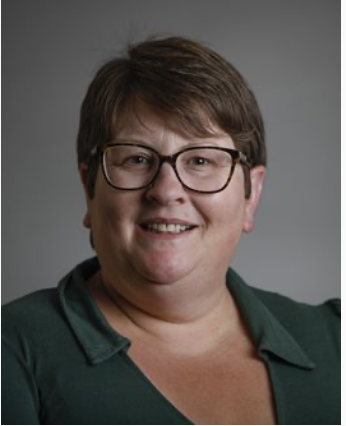
- Official portrait, 2026

Member of the Scottish Parliament for South Scotland (1 of 7 Regional MSPs)
- Incumbent
- Assumed office 7 May 2026

Scottish Green Shadow portfolios
- 2026-: Education

Personal details
- Born: Laura Elizabeth Jones; 27 July 1978 (age 48) Bradford, West Yorkshire, England
- Party: Scottish Greens
- Spouse: Matthew Moodie
- Children: 4
- Education: University of Edinburgh (MA)
- Website: greens.scot/team/laura-moodie

Laura Moodie (born 1978) is a Scottish Greens politician who has served as a Member of the Scottish Parliament (MSP) for South Scotland since May 2026.

== Background ==
Laura Moodie was born in Bradford, West Yorkshire, England in 1978. She was born to a father from Flintshire in Wales and a mother from Yorkshire in England. She later moved to Scotland to study History at the University of Edinburgh. She worked as a features editor at the University's student newspaper, The Student.

After university, Moodie moved to Strathbungo, Glasgow where she became involved in the Strathbungo Society and the Glasgow Civic Forum. She then settled in Dumfries and Galloway, living in Borgue, near Kirkcudbright.

Moodie was involved in setting up Dumfries-based refugee charity Massive Outpouring of Love (now known as the Depot), as well as a community organisation supporting Kirkcudbright Skatepark. She has professional experience in publishing, social enterprise and broadcasting, including working as a television subtitler. She was a member of the Borgue Community Council. Until May 2026, Moodie worked as the Communications and Operations Manager for Ariane Burgess.

== Political career ==
At the 2016 Scottish Parliament election, Moodie was the fifth-placed candidate on the Scottish Greens list for the South Scotland region.

Moodie was a candidate in the Dee and Glenkens ward for Dumfries and Galloway Council in the 2017 council election, polling 292 votes. She later stood in the 2018 by-election, taking 342 first preferences, and was eliminated on the second count.

Moodie was the constituency candidate for Galloway and West Dumfries in the 2021 Scottish Parliament election, finishing fourth with 970 votes (2.6%). On the regional ballot for South Scotland, she headed the Scottish Greens' list of candidates. The party received 18,964 list votes (5.2%), narrowly missing out on winning a seat in the region.

At the 2022 Dumfries and Galloway Council election, Moodie stood again in Dee and Glenkens, receiving 508 votes.

Moodie was the Green candidate in Dumfries and Galloway in the 2024 United Kingdom general election, where she finished seventh with 1,249 votes (2.7%).

=== Member of the Scottish Parliament ===
Moodie was again the top Green candidate, on the South Scotland list, at the 2026 Scottish Parliament election. The party polled 31,170 list votes (9.7%), entitling them to one seat. Moodie became the second ever Scottish Greens representative for the South Scotland region, after Chris Ballance. She is currently the Scottish Green's spokesperson for Education.

== Personal life ==
Moodie lives with her four children and husband.
