= Joan McAlpine =

Scottish journalist and politician (born 1962)

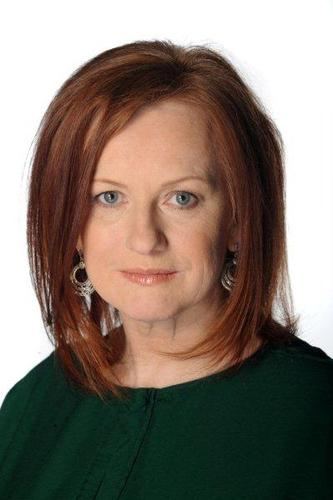
- McAlpine in 2013

Parliamentary Liaison Officer to the First Minister of Scotland
- In office 25 May 2011 – 4 September 2015 Serving with Humza Yousaf
- First Minister: Alex Salmond; Nicola Sturgeon
- Preceded by: Alasdair Allan
- Succeeded by: Jim Eadie, Kevin Stewart

Member of the Scottish Parliament for South Scotland 1 of 7 Regional MSPs
- In office 5 May 2011 – 5 May 2021

Personal details
- Born: 28 January 1962 (age 64) Gourock, Renfrewshire, Scotland
- Party: Scottish National Party
- Spouse: Pat Kane (divorced)
- Children: 2 daughters (Grace, Eleanor)
- Education: University of Glasgow; City University London
- Website: www.joanmcalpine.com

Joan McAlpine (born 28 January 1962) is a former Scottish journalist and Scottish National Party (SNP) politician. She was a Member of the Scottish Parliament (MSP) for the South Scotland region from 2011 to 2021. McAlpine is known for her opposition to the provisions of the legislation which sought to reform the Gender Recognition Act and for her views on sex and gender.

== Background ==
McAlpine was born in Gourock, Renfrewshire, and attended St Ninian's Primary School in Gourock and St Columba's High School in Greenock. She has an MA (Hons) in Scottish History and Economic History from University of Glasgow. She also has a Postgraduate Diploma in newspaper journalism from City University in London. McAlpine was formerly married to the writer and musician Pat Kane, with whom she has two daughters.

McAlpine began her career at the Greenock Telegraph in 1987. She went on to work for The Scotsman and The Sunday Times, where she won the Scottish Journalist of the Year award in 1999. In 2000 she was appointed editor of The Sunday Times Scotland and the following year became deputy editor of The Herald; the first woman to hold the post, although not the first Scottish female newspaper editor. She also wrote a weekly column for The Scotsman and the Daily record. In an online vote, her blog, Go Lassie Go, was voted the Scotblog Awards' top mainstream media blog in 2010. Go Lassie Go has not been updated since 2011.

In 1994 McAlpine co-authored a book on the history of the anti-poll tax campaign, A Time to Rage, with the political activist Tommy Sheridan. In 1999 a programme Border Television written and presented by McAlpine, Crossing the Border, received a commendation but no award at the New York Television Festival.

== Member of the Scottish Parliament ==
McAlpine was elected as a list MSP for the South of Scotland region in the 2011 Scottish Parliament election. She has been a media adviser for the SNP. McAlpine wrote speeches for the then First Minister of Scotland, Alex Salmond, and served as his Parliamentary Liaison Officer.

In November 2011 a member of McAlpine's staff, Gail Lythgoe, then married to Humza Yousaf, was found to have emailed a women's equality group, alleging that the Labour politician Ian Davidson has a history of bullying women and called on them to demonstrate against him whilst asking them not to reveal SNP involvement in the demonstration's instigation. The email was later leaked and Lythgoe publicly apologised for making unsubstantiated allegations, with the Labour Party stating that this was a result of an SNP "dirty tricks campaign" against Davidson and calling for an investigation.

In January 2012 as MSPs debated plans on the timing of an independence referendum, McAlpine told the Scottish Parliament that: "I absolutely make no apology for saying that the Liberals, the Labour Party and the Tories are anti-Scottish", provoking widespread condemnation from other political parties. Scottish Labour's then Deputy Leader Anas Sarwar said: "What is being questioned here is my commitment and my love of my country. The country in which I was born and brought up, the country to which my grandfather came in 1939 with nothing and made a life for himself. This is really serious."

In March 2012, McAlpine compared Scotland's place in the United Kingdom with a woman in an abusive marriage with a domineering man and stated that rival political parties were behaving in a sexist and misogynistic manner. Labour MP Margaret Curran said: "Comparing the United Kingdom to an abusive marriage is absurd and offensive to men or women genuinely trapped in that kind of relationship."

In May 2012, McAlpine was reprimanded by the Presiding Officer of the Scottish Parliament for failure to appear for Ministerial Questions to be asked a question which she had tabled in the Scottish Parliament. At the time she was to ask, she was eating dinner in a restaurant.

In February 2014 McAlpine referred herself to the Scottish Parliament's Presiding Officer after concerns were raised that she had broken Parliamentary rules while claiming expenses. McAlpine had invoiced the taxpayer for £1750 after she employed landscape photographer Jane McLachlan for ten days to take shots for her constituency publications. However, prior to her election McAlpine had had an affair with McLachlan's husband, Mark. McLachlan claimed that the photography work had never been carried out and McAlpine repaid the money in 2012. She was later cleared of any wrongdoing and Derek Croll, head of financial resources at Holyrood, concluded: "The Scottish Parliamentary Corporate Body considered a report on the matter at its meeting this morning. I am writing to inform you [Joan McAlpine] that, on the basis of the report and annexes presented to the corporate body, the SPCB determined that there was no evidence that a breach of the rules of the scheme has taken place."

McAlpine ran as the SNP candidate for Dumfriesshire at the 2016 Scottish Parliament election, finishing second to the Conservatives' Oliver Mundell with 12,306 votes (33.9%). She was returned on the South Scotland list.

At the 2021 Scottish Parliament election, McAlpine stood again in Dumfriesshire, where she increased her share of the vote to 37.7%, retaining second place. The SNP won a further two constituencies in the election, entitling them to one regional member this time. As a result, McAlpine, who had been placed second on the list, lost her seat.

=== Views on sex and gender ===
In February 2019, McAlpine tweeted explaining her belief that the Scottish census should record biological sex in order to monitor sex discrimination, and questioning the influence of key stakeholders in the Scottish government's consultation process. This led to her receiving online abuse including threats from some claiming to be SNP members that they would attempt to deselect her as a MSP, despite the fact that no deselection mechanism exists within the SNP. Her claims about the funding and role of several women's organisations led to the publication of an open-letter rebuking her claims, signed by organisations including Engender Scotland, Equate Scotland and Close the Gap. In May 2019, McAlpine's invitation for gender critical feminist Meghan Murphy to speak at Holyrood caused further controversy as a result of Murphy's perceived trans-exclusionary views. Writing in The Spectator, Stephen Daisley described McAlpine as "gender critical" and described the negative reaction she had received for her stance.

In 2019, the Scottish Parliament debated the Census (Amendment) (Scotland) Bill regarding a proposal from National Records of Scotland (NRS) to include a non-binary sex option on the 2021 UK census in Scotland. Prior to the debate, the Culture, Tourism, Europe and External Relations Committee, of which McAlpine was the convenor, published a "highly critical" report, decrying the lack of consultation with women's groups and stating that this had led the NRS to conflate sex and gender identity. Speaking during the Stage 3 debate of the Census (Amendment) (Scotland) Bill, McAlpine quoted Simone de Beauvoir, criticising the fact that "Stonewall's trans umbrella includes people with no medical treatment who refute the contention that they have a psychological condition" and stated that she "reject[s] the concept of innate gender identity". Following the debate, McAlpine wrote an article published in The Times newspaper, stating that she believed women would be erased "as a biological sex class" if a non-binary sex option were to be included. McAlpine did, however, vote in favour of the bill, which was passed unanimously.

In November 2019, it was announced that McAlpine and Labour MSP Jenny Marra would be hosting an event on behalf of the "Women's Human Rights Campaign", an international campaign that launched in New York in March 2019. The campaign states that its focus is on "the importance of keeping the current sex based definition of woman". The announcement was met with criticism from some feminist and LGBT groups, including Engender, The Equality Network and the Scottish Trans Alliance, who expressed their concerns that the Campaign's aims would breach Human Rights law, and in particular the rights of transgender people. A spokeswoman for the Campaign responded that their aim was to "re-affirm women's sex-based rights, as set out in international human rights documents".
