= Emma Harper =

Scottish National Party politician

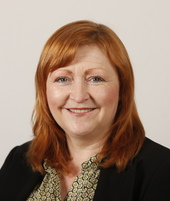
- Harper in 2016

Member of the Scottish Parliament for South Scotland (1 of 7 Regional MSPs)
- In office 5 May 2016 – 9 April 2026

Personal details
- Born: Emma Mary Harper; 1967 (age 58–59) Stranraer, Scotland
- Party: Scottish National Party
- Education: Dumfries and Galloway College of Nursing and Midwifery

Emma Harper is a Scottish National Party (SNP) politician. She was a Member of the Scottish Parliament (MSP) for the South Scotland region from the 2016 Scottish Parliament election until the 2026 Scottish Parliament election, where she lost her seat on the list.

== Early life ==
Harper was born and raised on a farm near Stranraer where her father was a dairyman. She attended Stranraer Academy. In 1978, the family moved to a farm near Annan and she attended Annan Academy prior to her nurse training in Dumfries at the Royal College of Nursing and Midwifery. After qualifying, she worked at the Dumfries and Galloway Royal Infirmary.

Harper has worked in hospitals in NHS Scotland and NHS England, and at Cedars-Sinai Medical Center in Los Angeles, California, United States. Her work included: transplant and trauma surgery, before going on to lead nursing surgical teams and provide specialist clinical education.

Harper is a degree-registered nurse and a member of the Royal College of Nursing and the Association for Perioperative Practice.

As a keen Burnsian, Harper is past president of Dumfries Ladies Burns Club Number 1.

== Political career ==
Harper joined the SNP in 2010. In 2015 she stood for the UK Parliament as SNP candidate for Dumfriesshire, Clydesdale & Tweeddale. She finished second and achieved a huge swing of +27.5% of the vote for the SNP, narrowly losing the seat by only 798 votes.

=== Member of the Scottish Parliament ===
In 2016 she was elected MSP to the Scottish Parliament for South Scotland (region), and was deputy convenor to the Health and Sport Committee and member of the Rural Economy and Connectivity Committee.

In 2019 she downplayed the issues around creating a new currency in an independent Scotland to a BBC audience, remarking that her recent holiday to Mexico demonstrated that, "plastic translates anywhere where you are"; she then claimed Scottish issued bank notes were currently being exchanged for more than English ones on the foreign exchange markets, which indicated that (in the future) "Our Scottish pounds have the propensity to be really really strong".

She was the top SNP candidate on the regional list in South Scotland at the 2021 Scottish Parliament election.

During the campaign she courted controversy when she told ITV that a hard border between an independent Scotland and England would bring opportunities, insisting: "We can show that a border will work, there are issues that have been brought to my attention that show that jobs can be created if a border is created." Her party leader, Nicola Sturgeon, disavowed the remarks and claimed: "I've not seen Emma's comments directly but nobody in the SNP wants to see a border between Scotland and England." In an opinion piece for The Scotsman, former Labour MP Brian Wilson remarked of the controversy: "First, in the real world, Scotland does more trade with Yorkshire than with China. Second, Ms Harper is a star in the SNP firmament, placed top of their regional list and a racing cert to return to Holyrood. Ye gods."

Harper was re-elected to the Scottish Parliament in the 2021 Scottish Parliament election.

In the 2026 Scottish Parliament election, Harper stood in Galloway and West Dumfries. She finished in second place behind Conservative Finlay Carson. She was not re-elected as the third SNP candidate on the South Scotland list.
