= Sharon Dowey =

Scottish Conservative politician

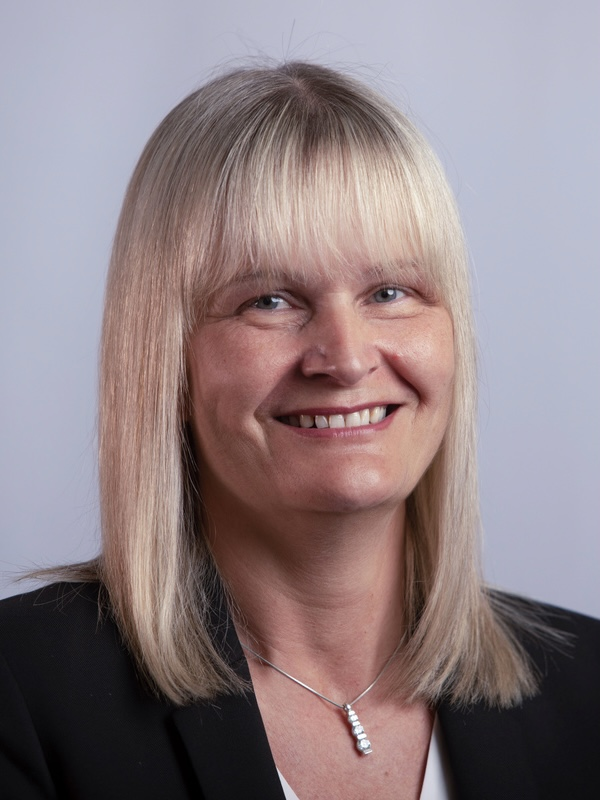

Member of the Scottish Parliament for South Scotland (1 of 7 Regional MSPs)
- In office 6 May 2021 – 9 April 2026

Personal details
- Born: 1969 or 1970 (age 55–56) Girvan, Ayrshire, Scotland
- Party: Scottish Conservatives
- Children: 3

Sharon Dowey (born 1969/1970) is a Scottish Conservative Party politician. She was a Member of the Scottish Parliament (MSP) for the South Scotland region from May 2021 until the 2026 election.

== Early life ==
Dowey was born in Girvan and brought up in Maybole. She has lived and worked in Ayrshire all her life.

Before her election to the Parliament, Dowey was a senior manager at the Morrisons supermarket chain, where she had worked since she was 16.

== Political career ==
=== Member of the Scottish Parliament ===
At the 2021 Scottish Parliament election. Dowey stood in the Carrick, Cumnock and Doon Valley constituency, where she came second to Elena Whitham of the Scottish National Party (SNP). She achieved 30.6% of the vote, a 6.4% increase for the Scottish Conservative Party from the previous Scottish Parliament Election in 2016. She was subsequently elected on the South Scotland regional list.

On 12 January 2022, Dowey called for Boris Johnson to resign as Conservative party leader and Prime Minister over the Westminster lockdown parties controversy along with a majority of Scottish Conservative MSPs.

Dowey is a member of 15 Cross-Party Groups (CPGs) in the Scottish Parliament, and serves as Depute Convener of the CPG on Wood Panel Industry.

In the 2026 Scottish Parliament election, she unsuccessfully stood for the Ayr constituency and was fourth candidate on the party list of the Scottish Conservatives for South Scotland.

== Personal life ==
Dowey is married to Martin, a former police officer and the former Leader of South Ayrshire Council. They have three children.
