= Katie Hagmann =

Scottish politician

Katie Hagmann MSP
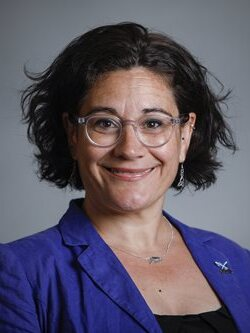
- Official Portrait 2026

Member of the Scottish Parliament for Carrick, Cumnock and Doon Valley
- Incumbent
- Assumed office 7 May 2026
- Preceded by: Elena Whitham
- Majority: 2,622 (9.1%)

Convener of the Equalities, Human Rights and Civil Justice Committee
- Incumbent
- Assumed office 10 June 2026

Personal details
- Born: Katie Elise Hagmann; April 1979 (age 47)
- Party: Scottish National Party

Katie Elise Hagmann (born April 1979) is a Scottish politician who was elected to the Scottish Parliament in the 2026 parliamentary election. She represents Carrick, Cumnock and Doon Valley as a member of the Scottish National Party. Hagmann is currently the convener of the Equalities, Human Rights and Civil Justice Committee.

Prior to her election as MSP, Hagmann was an SNP councillor for Mid Galloway and Wigtown West ward, having been elected in both the 2017 and the 2022 Dumfries and Galloway Council elections.

Scottish Parliament
Preceded by Elena Whitham	Member of the Scottish Parliament for Carrick, Cumnock and Doon Valley; 2026–present	Incumbent
