= Galloway and West Dumfries =

Region or constituency of the Scottish Parliament

- County constituency for the Scottish Parliament
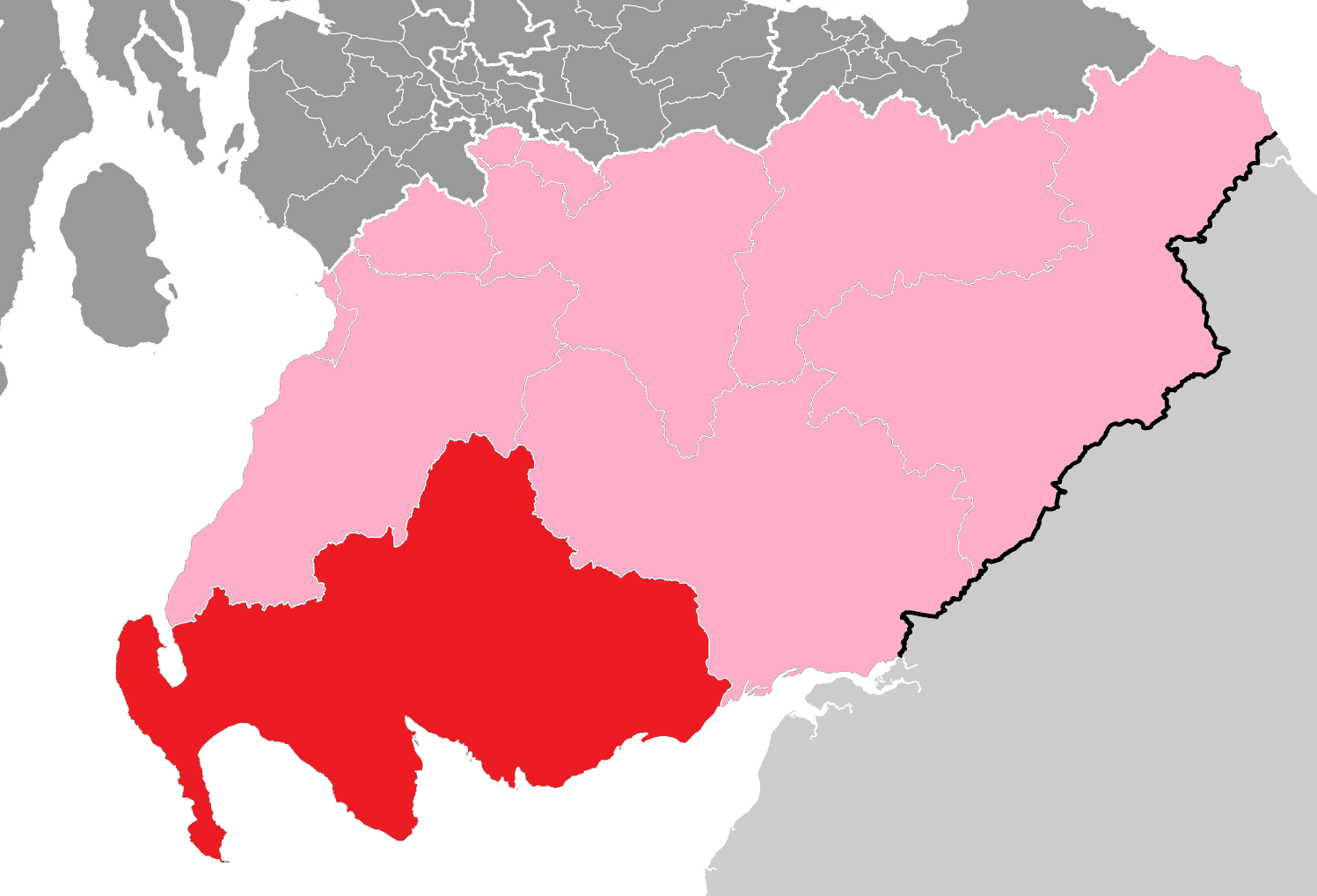

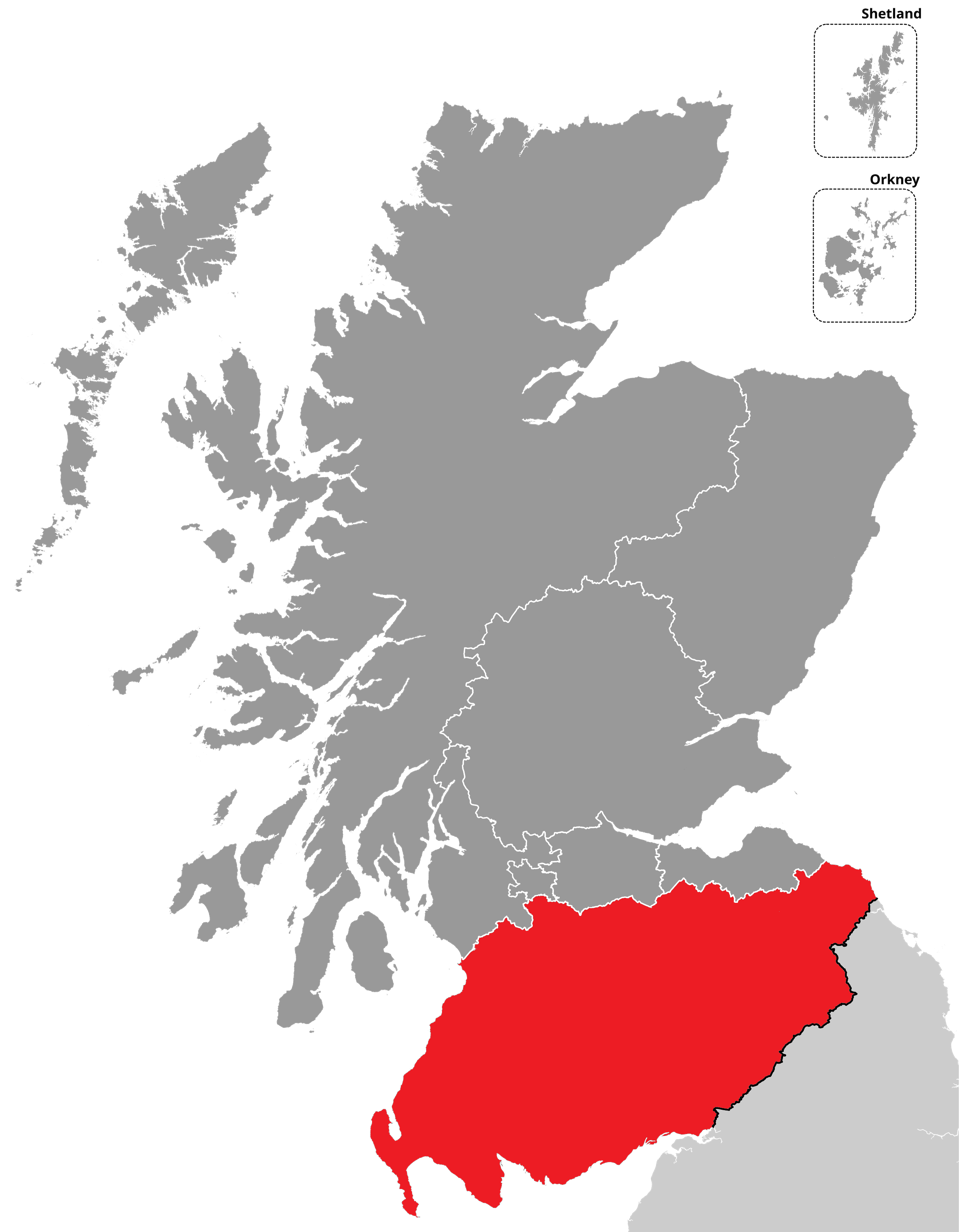
- Galloway and West Dumfries shown within the South Scotland electoral region, and the region shown within Scotland
- Electoral region: South Scotland
- Electorate: 58,051 (2026)

Current constituency
- Created: 2011
- Party: Conservative
- MSP: Finlay Carson
- Council area: Dumfries and Galloway
- Created from: Dumfries, Galloway and Upper Nithsdale

Galloway and West Dumfries (Gaelic: Gall-Ghaidhealaibh agus Dùn Phrìs an Iar) is a county constituency of the Scottish Parliament covering part of the council area of Dumfries and Galloway. Under the additional-member electoral system used for elections to the Scottish Parliament, it elects one Member of the Scottish Parliament (MSP) by the first past the post method of election. It is also one of ten constituencies in the South Scotland electoral region, which elects seven additional members, in addition to the ten constituency MSPs, to produce a form of proportional representation for the region as a whole.

Created for the 2011 Scottish Parliament election, it comprises areas that were previously part of the old Dumfries and Galloway and Upper Nithsdale constituencies, which were abolished. The seat is largely identical to the historic counties of Kirkcudbrightshire and Wigtownshire.

The seat has been held by Finlay Carson of the Conservatives since the 2016 Scottish Parliament election.

== Electoral region ==
Following the second periodic review of Scottish Parliament boundaries in 2025, the other nine constituencies of the South Scotland region are: Ayr; Carrick, Cumnock and Doon Valley; Clydesdale; Dumfriesshire; East Kilbride; Ettrick, Roxburgh and Berwickshire; Hamilton, Larkhall and Stonehouse; Kilmarnock and Irvine Valley; and Midlothian South, Tweeddale and Lauderdale. The region covers the whole of the council areas of Dumfries and Galloway, Scottish Borders, and South Ayrshire council areas; and parts of the council areas of East Ayrshire, Midlothian, and South Lanarkshire. By population it is now the largest of Scotland's eight electoral regions.

Prior to the 2025 review, there were nine constituencies in the South Scotland region. Besides Galloway and West Dumfries, the other eight constituencies were: Ayr; Carrick, Cumnock and Doon Valley; Clydesdale; Dumfriesshire; East Lothian; Ettrick, Roxburgh and Berwickshire; Kilmarnock and Irvine Valley; and Midlothian South, Tweeddale and Lauderdale. The region covered the Dumfries and Galloway, East Ayrshire, Scottish Borders and South Ayrshire council areas in full and parts of the East Lothian, Midlothian and South Lanarkshire council areas.

== Constituency boundaries and council area ==
Wards of the Galloway and West Dumfries Scottish Parliament constituency as of 2011

Dumfries and Galloway is represented in the Scottish Parliament by two constituencies: Dumfriesshire and Galloway and West Dumfries. Galloway and West Dumfries covers the western part of the council area. The town of Dumfries is divided between the two constituencies.

The seat remained largely unchanged following the Second Periodic Review of Scottish Parliament Boundaries undertaken by Boundaries Scotland ahead of the 2026 Scottish Parliament election, although there was a minor amendment to alter the section of the boundary with Dumfriesshire that follows the River Nith: previously this had followed the riverbank, the review moved this to the centre of the river to align with ward boundaries. The electoral wards of Dumfries and Galloway Council used in the current creation of Clydesdale are:

- Stranraer and the Rhins
- Mid Galloway and Wigtown West
- Dee and Glenkens
- Castle Douglas and Crocketford
- Abbey
- North West Dumfries

== Constituency profile and voting patterns ==
=== Constituency profile ===
The Galloway and West Dumfries constituency covers a large, diverse stretch of land between the Rhins of Galloway in the extreme south-west of Scotland and the River Nith and Cluden Water in eastern Dumfries and Galloway. It covers a set of rugged pastoral plains and forests across the region of Galloway, taking in rural towns such as Castle Douglas, Newton Stewart, Kirkcudbright and St John's Town of Dalry. To the west of the constituency is the portly town of Stranraer, situated at the base of Loch Ryan, whilst in the east the constituency takes in patches of Dumfries, administrative centre of the Dumfries and Galloway Council area.

=== Voting patterns ===
Galloway and West Dumfries has a dynamic mix of political traditions. It covers most of the former Galloway and Upper Nithsdale constituency, a seat which has a long-standing tradition of being marginally contested between the Conservatives and the Scottish National Party, in addition to patches of the former safe Labour constituency of Dumfries. This dynamic was represented within local council politics with Wigtownshire traditionally voting SNP, Kirkcudbrightshire voting Conservative and Dumfries voting Labour.

At Westminster the Galloway and Upper Nithsdale constituency was represented by Conservative Ian Lang from its creation at the 1983 UK general election until 1997. It became the only Conservative constituency in the UK Parliament in Scotland in 2001. The Conservatives have represented the area in the Scottish Parliament since 2003.

In the 2022 council election, the Conservative secured the largest number of first preference votes in 5 out of the 6 wards in Galloway and West Dumfries, this representing all of the Galloway wards. In the final ward in the seat, North West Dumfries, the SNP secured the largest number of first preference votes.

== Member of the Scottish Parliament ==
Election	Member	Party
2011	Alex Fergusson	Conservative
2016	Finlay Carson	Conservative

== Election results ==
=== 2020s ===
2026 Scottish Parliament election: Galloway and West Dumfries
Party	Candidate	Constituency			Regional		
Party	Candidate	Votes	%	±%	Votes	%	±%
Conservative	Finlay Carson (Note: Incumbent member for this constituency)	11,502	38.3	▼8.7	9,482	31.5	▼10.5
SNP	Emma Harper (Note: Incumbent member on the party list, or for another constituency)	9,903	33.0	▼6.9	7,512	24.9	▼11.9
Reform	Senga Beresford (Note: Elected on the party list)	4,674	15.6	▲15.6	5,418	18.0	▲17.8
Green					2,732	9.1	▲4.8
Labour	Jack McConnel	2,544	8.5	▲0.6	2,699	9.0	▼0.4
Liberal Democrats	Tracey Warman	1,380	4.6	▲2.1	1,394	4.6	▲1.9
Independent Green Voice					215	0.7	▲0.3
Scottish Family					195	0.6	▲0.1
AtLS					171	0.6	New
Scottish Socialist					88	0.3	New
Heritage					54	0.2	New
Independent	Denise Sommerville				53	0.2	New
UKIP					34	0.1	▼0.1
Independent	Sean Davies				33	0.1	New
ADF					28	0.1	New
Scottish Libertarian					19	0.1	Steady
Scottish Common Party					17	0.1	New
Majority		1,599	3.3	▼3.8			
Valid votes		30,003			30,144		
Invalid votes		102			70		
Turnout		30,105	51.9	▼13.0	30,214	52.0	
Conservative hold		Swing					
Notes

2021 Scottish Parliament election: Galloway and West Dumfries
Party	Candidate	Constituency			Regional		
Party	Candidate	Votes	%	±%	Votes	%	±%
Conservative	Finlay Carson (Note: Incumbent member for this constituency)	17,486	47.0	▲3.5	15,610	42.01	▲2.63
SNP	Emma Harper (Note: Incumbent member on the party list, or for another constituency)	14,851	39.9	▲0.9	13,683	36.82	▲0.82
Labour	Archie Dryburgh	2,932	7.9	▼6.7	3,483	9.37	▼4.95
Green	Laura Moodie	970	2.6	New	1,583	4.26	▼0.02
Liberal Democrats	Iain McDonald	948	2.5	▼0.3	985	2.65	▲0.19
All for Unity					725	1.95	New
Alba					259	0.70	New
Scottish Family					202	0.54	New
Abolish the Scottish Parliament					165	0.44	New
Independent Green Voice					138	0.37	New
UKIP					91	0.24	▼2.30
Reform					83	0.22	New
Freedom Alliance (UK)					73	0.20	New
Scottish Libertarian					51	0.14	New
Scotia Future					21	0.06	New
Vanguard					9	0.02	New
Majority		2,635	7.1	▲2.6			
Valid votes		37,187			37,161		
Invalid votes		81					
Turnout		37,268	64.9	▲5.5			
Conservative hold		Swing		▲2.3			

=== 2010s ===
2016 Scottish Parliament election: Galloway and West Dumfries
Party	Candidate	Constituency			Regional		
Party	Candidate	Votes	%	±%	Votes	%	±%
Conservative	Finlay Carson	14,527	43.5	▲6.6	13,162	39.4	▲12.5
SNP	Aileen McLeod (Note: Incumbent member on the party list, or for another constituency)	13,013	39.0	▲5.0	12,033	36.0	▼2.3
Labour	Fiona O'Donnell	4,876	14.6	▼11.9	4,789	14.3	▼8.1
Green					1,431	4.3	▲1.3
Liberal Democrats	Andrew Metcalf	947	2.8	▲0.3	824	2.4	▼0.4
UKIP					852	2.5	▲0.7
RISE					91	0.3	New
Clydesdale and South Scotland Independent					133	0.4	New
Solidarity					112	0.3	▲0.3
Majority		1,514	4.5	▲1.7			
Valid votes		33,363			33,427		
Invalid votes		95			57		
Turnout		33,458	59.4	▲6.2	33,484	59.5	▲6.4
Conservative hold		Swing		▲0.8			
Notes

2011 Scottish Parliament election: Galloway and West Dumfries
Party	Candidate	Constituency			Regional		
Party	Candidate	Votes	%	±%	Votes	%	±%
Conservative	Alex Fergusson (Note: Incumbent member for the Galloway and Upper Nithsdale constituency)	11,071	36.9	N/A	8,049	26.9	N/A
SNP	Aileen McLeod (Note: Elected on the party list)	10,209	34.0	N/A	11,470	38.3	N/A
Labour	Willie Scobie	7,954	26.5	N/A	6,711	22.4	N/A
Green					897	3.0	N/A
Liberal Democrats	Joe Rosiejak	763	2.5	N/A	844	2.8	N/A
UKIP					550	1.8	N/A
All-Scotland Pensioners Party					509	1.7	N/A
Socialist Labour					402	1.3	N/A
BNP					241	0.8	N/A
Scottish Christian					218	0.7	N/A
Scottish Socialist					57	0.2	N/A
Solidarity					25	0.1	N/A
Majority		862	2.9	N/A			
Valid votes		29,997			29,973		
Invalid votes		123			88		
Turnout		30,120	53.2	N/A	30,061	53.1	N/A
Conservative win (new seat)							
