= David Kirkwood (Reform politician) =

Scottish politician

David Kirkwood MSP
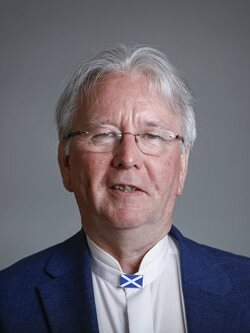
- Official Portrait, 2026

Member of the Scottish Parliament for South Scotland (1 of 7 Regional MSPs)
- Incumbent
- Assumed office 7 May 2026

Personal details
- Party: Reform Party Scotland

David Kirkwood is a Scottish Reform UK politician and engineer who has served as a Member of the Scottish Parliament for South Scotland since May 2026.

== Biography ==
Kirkwood has an MSc in Engineering Technology and Management from University of Strathclyde, and graduated in 1981, according to his LinkedIn.

== Political career ==
Kirkwood voted for Scottish Independence in the 2014 independence referendum.

Kirkwood was the second-placed Reform UK candidate on the South Scotland regional list at the 2021 Scottish Parliament election, but was not elected.

Kirkwood was Reform's candidate for the Dumfriesshire, Clydesdale and Tweeddale constituency in the 2024 United Kingdom general election, coming in 4th place with 3,822 votes (8.6%).

=== Member of the Scottish Parliament ===
At the 2026 Scottish Parliament election, Kirkwood stood in the Dumfriesshire constituency, finishing third with 17.7% of the vote. On the regional ballot, Kirkwood was placed second, and was one of three Reform candidates to be elected as list MSPs for South Scotland.

== Personal life ==
Kirkwood lives in Moffat, Dumfries and Galloway, and was on the Moffat and District Community Council from 27 February 2024, to 9 May 2026.
