= Scotia Future =

Political party in Scotland

- Leader: Chic Brodie
- Founded: September 2020
- Registered: PP12489
- Dissolved: March 2023
- Headquarters: 23 Maybole Road; Ayr; KA7 2PZ
- Ideology: Scottish independence Euroscepticism
- Colours: Purple

Website
- www.scotia-future.scot

Scotia Future was a political party in Scotland which supported Scottish independence. The party was in favour of what it considered "Real Independence and a Scotland of Equals" outside both the United Kingdom and the European Union with a Swiss-style relationship within EFTA. On social and economic issues, the Party looked to an older radical nationalist tradition in Scotland than the Scottish National Party (SNP), such as to the economic radicalism of the Scots National League, the Co-operative Movement, and the Highland Land League. Its colours were purple and white, and its logo was a triquetra superimposed on a map of Scotland.

Following a discussion with its members, its Nominating Officer, Cllr Andy Doig, dissolved the Party in March 2023. The Party Leader and Treasurer, Chic Brodie, former MSP, having died in September 2022. The remaining party funds were donated to the pro-independence campaign group, Salvo Scotland, in April 2023.

== History ==
Scotia Future was founded on 9 September 2020 by former SNP MSP Chic Brodie. It was registered by the Electoral Commission the same day.

On 22 October 2020, Cllr Andy Doig became Scotia Future's first elected representative when he defected to the party while sitting on Renfrewshire Council for the Johnstone North, Kilbarchan, Howwood and Lochwinnoch ward, having been elected as an independent. He had been both an SNP representative and an independent, but the party to date has decided not to contest elections to either Westminster or local government, but only to contest Holyrood elections, so Cllr Doig retains his Independent status on Renfrewshire Council. In February 2021 Chic Brodie announced his candidacy on behalf of Scotia Future to stand in Ayr constituency at that year's Scottish elections, and Cllr Doig announced his candidacy on behalf of Scotia Future to stand in Renfrewshire South constituency also.

Brodie died on 24 September 2022 following a short illness, and the party was dissolved six months later, with their remaining funds being donated to Salvo Scotland.

== Manifesto launch and policies ==
Scotia Future launched its Holyrood manifesto on 4 April 2021. It stated that the focus of the election should be on "policies not personalities", which may have been an oblique reference to the very personal contest at that election between the SNP led by Nicola Sturgeon and the newly created Alba Party led by Alex Salmond. The Manifesto called for a programme of more residential rehab centres to treat alcoholism, a strategy to repopulate the Highlands and Islands, a post-independence referendum on the monarchy, a second revising Scottish Senate based in Edinburgh and a House of Representatives based in Glasgow, the introduction of single transferable voting to Holyrood, the decentralisation of local government, and a commitment to repatriating all employment law to Holyrood and the introduction of employee votes and shareholding in every company above a certain size, as in Germany.

== Electoral performance ==
=== Scottish Parliament ===
Year	Regional Vote			Constituency Vote			Overall Seats	Change
2021	451 votes	0.0%	0 / 56	1,032 votes	0.0%	0 / 73	0 / 129	New Party
