= Finlay Carson =

Scottish Conservative politician

Finlay Carson MSP
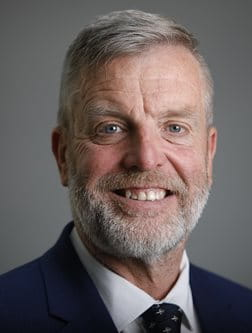
- Official parliamentary portrait, 2026

Convener of the Rural Affairs, Islands and Natural Environment Committee
- In office 22 June 2021 – 8 April 2026
- Deputy: Beatrice Wishart
- Preceded by: Gillian Martin
- Succeeded by: Mark Ruskell

Member of the Scottish Parliament for Galloway and West Dumfries
- Incumbent
- Assumed office 5 May 2016
- Preceded by: Alex Fergusson
- Majority: 1,599 (3.3%)

Scottish Conservative Shadow portfolios
- 2026–: Shadow Cabinet Secretary for Rural Affairs and Environment

Personal details
- Born: Finlay Hamilton Carson; 18 October 1967 (age 58) Twynholm, Kirkcudbrightshire, Scotland
- Party: Scottish Conservative Party
- Spouse(s): Jackie Carson (m. 2020) Charlotte Carson (divorced)
- Children: 4
- Education: University of Aberdeen

Finlay Hamilton Carson (born 18 October 1967) is a Scottish Conservative Party politician who served as Convener of the Rural Affairs, Islands and Natural Environment Committee from 2021 to 2026. He has been the Member of the Scottish Parliament (MSP) for the Galloway and West Dumfries since 2016.

== Early life and education ==
Carson was born in Twynholm on 18 October 1967. He attended Twynholm Primary School and later Kirkcudbright Academy. Carson then went to study at the University of Aberdeen where he graduated with a BSc Agriculture. Carson and his brother ran an IT business together. Carson lives with wife Jackie and has 4 children.

== Political career ==
Carson, from 2012, was a councillor for Castle Douglas and Glenkens. He succeeded Peter Duncan who was the former MP for Galloway and Upper Nithsdale.

In 2015 he stood for the UK Parliament as the Conservative candidate for the Dumfries and Galloway constituency where he was unsuccessful and came second to the SNP's Richard Arkless by 11.5% of the vote.

In 2016 he stood for the Scottish Parliament in Galloway and West Dumfries, in place of the retiring Conservative MSP Alex Fergusson. He successfully held the seat for the Conservatives and had a majority of 1,514 votes (4.5%) over his SNP rival Aileen McLeod with a swing of 0.8% from the SNP to the Conservatives.

Carson is the convener of the Scottish Parliament's Rural Affairs and Islands Committee.

On 12 January 2022, Carson called for Boris Johnson to resign as Conservative party leader and Prime Minister over the Westminster lockdown parties controversy along with a majority of Scottish Conservative MSPs.

Scottish Parliament
Preceded by Alex Fergusson	Member of the Scottish Parliament for Galloway and West Dumfries; 2016–present	Incumbent
