= List of Labour members of the Scottish Parliament =

This is a list of Scottish Labour MSPs. It includes all members of the Scottish Parliament (MSPs) who represented Scottish Labour in the Scottish Parliament.

== List of MSPs ==
Name	Constituency or region	Type	Start year	End year	Reason
Irshad Ahmed	Edinburgh and Lothians East	Region	2026		Serving
Wendy Alexander	Paisley North	Constituency	1999	2011	Retired
Jackie Baillie	Dumbarton	Constituency	1999		Serving
Claire Baker	Mid Scotland and Fife	Region	2007		Serving
Richard Baker	North East Scotland	Region	2003	2016 (Note: Richard Baker resigned as MSP in January 2016. His replacement was Lesley Brennan, as she had been next on Labour's North East Scotland regional list. Brennan was defeated at the May 2016 Scottish Parliament election.)	Resigned
Scott Barrie	Dunfermline West	Constituency	1999	2011	Defeated
Jayne Baxter	Mid Scotland and Fife	Region	2012 (Note: On 7 December 2012, John Park resigned as list MSP for the Mid Scotland and Fife region. He was succeeded by Jayne Baxter.)	2016	Retired
Claudia Beamish	South Scotland	Region	2011	2021	Defeated
Neil Bibby	West Scotland	Region	2011		Serving
Sarah Boyack	Edinburgh Central	Constituency	1999	2011 (Note: Sarah Boyack was defeated in her Edinburgh Central constituency seat in 2011, but was elected in the same election as an Additional Member for the Lothian region. At the 2016 election, she was defeated in Lothian, but on 15 July 2019 Kezia Dugdale resigned as a Lothian MP, and as the next-placed member of the Labour list for Lothian, Boyack was deemed elected to replace her.)	Defeated
Sarah Boyack	Lothian	Region	2011	2016	Defeated
Sarah Boyack	Lothian	Region	2019	2026	Retired
Rhona Brankin	Midlothian	Constituency	1999	2011	Retired
Lesley Brennan	North East Scotland	Region	2016	2016	Defeated
Bill Butler	Glasgow Anniesland	Constituency	2000	2011	Defeated
Malcolm Chisholm	Edinburgh North and Leith	Constituency	1999	2011	Constituency abolished
Malcolm Chisholm	Edinburgh Northern and Leith	Constituency	2011	2016	Retired
Foysol Choudhury	Lothian	Region	2021	2026	Retired
Katy Clark	West Scotland	Region	2021		Serving
Cathie Craigie	Cumbernauld and Kilsyth	Constituency	1999	2011	Defeated
Margaret Curran	Glasgow Baillieston	Constituency	1999	2011	Retired
Susan Deacon	Edinburgh East and Musselburgh	Constituency	1999	2007	Retired
Donald Dewar	Glasgow Anniesland	Constituency	1999	2000	Died
Kezia Dugdale	Lothian	Region	2011	2019 (Note: On 15 July 2019 Kezia Dugdale resigned as MSP for Lothian region. As the next-placed member of the Labour list for Lothian, Sarah Boyack was deemed elected to replace her.)	Resigned
Pam Duncan-Glancy	Glasgow	Region	2021	2026	Retired
Helen Eadie	Dunfermline East	Constituency	1999	2011	Constituency abolished
Helen Eadie	Cowdenbeath	Constituency	2011	2013	Died
Joe Fagan	South Scotland	Region	2026		Serving
Mary Fee	West of Scotland	Region	2011	2021	Retired
Patricia Ferguson	Glasgow Maryhill	Constituency	1999	2011	Constituency abolished
Patricia Ferguson	Glasgow Maryhill and Springburn	Constituency	2011	2016	Defeated
Neil Findlay	Lothian	Region	2011	2021	Retired
Brian Fitzpatrick	Strathkelvin and Bearsden	Constituency	2001	2003	Defeated
Sam Galbraith	Strathkelvin and Bearsden	Constituency	1999	2001	Resigned
Karen Gillon	Clydesdale	Constituency	1999	2011	Defeated
Marlyn Glen	North East Scotland	Region	2003	2011	Retired
Trish Godman	West Renfrewshire	Constituency	1999	2011	Constituency abolished
Charlie Gordon	Glasgow Cathcart	Constituency	2005	2011	Defeated
Rhoda Grant	Highlands and Islands	Region	2007	2026	Retired
Iain Gray	Edinburgh Pentlands	Constituency	1999	2003	Defeated
Iain Gray	East Lothian	Constituency	2007	2021	Retired
Mark Griffin	Central Scotland	Region	2011		Serving
Hugh Henry	Paisley South	Constituency	1999	2011	Constituency abolished
Hugh Henry	Renfrewshire South	Constituency	2011	2016	Retired
Cara Hilton	Dunfermline	Constituency	2013	2016	Defeated
John Home Robertson	East Lothian	Constituency	1999	2007	Retired
Janis Hughes	Glasgow Rutherglen	Constituency	1999	2007	Retired
Gordon Jackson	Glasgow Govan	Constituency	1999	2007	Defeated
Sylvia Jackson	Stirling	Constituency	1999	2007	Defeated
Cathy Jamieson	Carrick, Cumnock and Doon Valley	Constituency	1999	2011	Retired
Margaret Jamieson	Kilmarnock and Loudoun	Constituency	1999	2007	Defeated
Daniel Johnson	Edinburgh Southern	Constituency	2016		Serving
James Kelly	Glasgow Rutherglen	Constituency	2007	2011	Constituency abolished
James Kelly	Rutherglen	Constituency	2011	2016	Defeated
James Kelly	Glasgow	Region	2016	2021	Defeated
Andy Kerr	East Kilbride	Constituency	1999	2011	Defeated
Johann Lamont	Glasgow Pollok	Constituency	1999	2016	Defeated (Note: Johann Lamont was defeated for her constituency seat in 2016, but was elected as a Regional Member in 2016.)
Johann Lamont	Glasgow	Region	2016	2021	Retired
Monica Lennon	Central Scotland	Region	2016	2026	Defeated
Monica Lennon	Glasgow	Region	2026		Serving
Richard Leonard	Central Scotland	Region	2016	2026	Retired
Marilyn Livingstone	Kirkcaldy	Constituency	1999	2011	Defeated
Joe Long	Mid Scotland and Fife	Region	2026		Serving
Lewis Macdonald	Aberdeen Central	Constituency	1999	2011	Defeated
Lewis Macdonald	North East Scotland	Region	2011	2021	Retired
Ken Macintosh (Note: Ken Macintosh served as Presiding Officer of the Scottish Parliament from 2016 to 2021. As is customary, he suspended his Scottish Labour party membership for that period.)	Eastwood	Constituency	1999	2016	Defeated
Ken Macintosh	West Scotland	Region	2016	2021	Retired
Angus MacKay	Edinburgh South	Constituency	1999	2003	Defeated
Donald MacKinnon	Na h-Eileanan an Iar	Constituency	2026		Serving
Kate Maclean	Dundee West	Constituency	1999	2007	Defeated
Maureen Macmillan	Highlands and Islands	Region	1999	2007	Defeated
Hanzala Malik	Glasgow	Region	2011	2016	Defeated
Jenny Marra	North East Scotland	Region	2011	2021	Retired
Michael Marra	North East Scotland	Region	2021		Serving
Paul Martin	Glasgow Springburn	Constituency	1999	2011	Constituency abolished
Paul Martin	Glasgow Provan	Constituency	2011	2016	Defeated
Christine May	Central Fife	Constituency	2003	2007	Defeated
John McAllion	Dundee East	Constituency	1999	2003	Defeated
Frank McAveety	Glasgow Shettleston	Constituency	1999	2011	Defeated
Tom McCabe	Hamilton South	Constituency	1999	2011	Defeated
Jack McConnell	Motherwell and Wishaw	Constituency	1999	2011	Retired
Margaret McCulloch	Central Scotland	Region	2011	2016	Defeated
Margaret McDougall	West Scotland	Region	2011	2016	Retired
Henry McLeish	Central Fife	Constituency	1999	2003	Retired
Michael McMahon	Hamilton North and Bellshill	Constituency	1999	2011	Constituency abolished
Michael McMahon	Uddingston and Bellshill	Constituency	2011	2016	Defeated
Siobhan McMahon	Central Scotland	Region	2011	2016	Defeated
Duncan McNeil	Greenock and Inverclyde	Constituency	1999	2016	Retired
Pauline McNeill	Glasgow Kelvin	Constituency	1999	2011	Defeated
Pauline McNeill	Glasgow	Region	2016		Serving
Des McNulty	Clydebank and Milngavie	Constituency	1999	2011	Defeated
Anne McTaggart	Glasgow	Region	2011	2016	Defeated
Carol Mochan	South Scotland	Region	2021		Serving
Alasdair Morrison	Western Isles	Constituency	1999	2007	Defeated
Bristow Muldoon	Livingston	Constituency	1999	2007	Defeated
Mary Mulligan	Linlithgow	Constituency	1999	2011	Defeated
Elaine Murray	Dumfries	Constituency	1999	2011	Constituency abolished
Elaine Murray	Dumfriesshire	Constituency	2011	2016	Defeated
Paul O'Kane	West Scotland	Region	2021	2026	Defeated
Irene Oldfather	Cunninghame South	Constituency	1999	2011	Defeated
John Park	Mid Scotland and Fife	Region	2007	2012	Resigned
Peter Peacock	Highlands and Islands	Region	1999	2011	Retired
Graeme Pearson	South Scotland	Region	2011	2016	Retired
Cathy Peattie	Falkirk East	Constituency	1999	2011	Defeated
John Pentland	Motherwell and Wishaw	Constituency	2011	2016	Defeated
Alex Rowley	Cowdenbeath	Constituency	2014	2016	Defeated
Alex Rowley	Mid Scotland and Fife	Region	2016	2026	Retired
Katherine Sangster	Edinburgh and Lothians East	Region	2026		Serving
Anas Sarwar	Glasgow	Region	2016	2026	Resigned
Richard Simpson	Ochil	Constituency	1999	2003	Defeated
Richard Simpson	Mid Scotland and Fife	Region	2007	2016	Retired
Davy Russell	Hamilton, Larkhall and Stonehouse	Constituency	2025	2026	Defeated
Drew Smith	Glasgow	Region	2011	2016	Retired
Elaine Smith	Coatbridge and Chryston	Constituency	1999	2016	Defeated (Note: At the 2016 Scottish Parliament election, Elaine Smith was defeated in her constituency, but was elected as a Regional Member for the Central Scotland region.)
Elaine Smith	Central Scotland	Region	2016	2021	Retired
Colin Smyth	South Scotland	Region	2016	2026	Retired
David Stewart	Highlands and Islands	Region	2007	2021	Retired
Paul Sweeney	Glasgow	Region	2021		Serving
Elaine Thomson	Aberdeen North	Constituency	1999	2003	Defeated
Mercedes Villalba	North East Scotland	Region	2021	2026	Retired
Mike Watson	Glasgow Cathcart	Constituency	1999	2005	Resigned
Ian Welsh	Ayr	Constituency	1999	1999	Resigned
Karen Whitefield	Airdrie and Shotts	Constituency	1999	2011	Defeated
Martin Whitfield	South Scotland	Region	2021	2026	Defeated
David Whitton	Strathkelvin and Bearsden	Constituency	2007	2011	Defeated
Allan Wilson	Cunninghame North	Constituency	1999	2007	Defeated
Jenny Young	Central Scotland and Lothians West	Region	2026		Serving
