= Marriage and Civil Partnership (Scotland) Act 2014 =

Act of the Scottish Parliament

Marriage and Civil Partnership (Scotland) Act 2014 (Note: Section 37.)
- Act of the Scottish Parliament
- Scottish Parliament
- Long title: An Act of the Scottish Parliament to make provision for the marriage of persons of the same sex; to make further provision as to the persons who may solemnise marriage and as to marriage procedure and the places at which civil marriages may be solemnised; to make provision for the registration of civil partnerships by celebrants of religious or belief bodies; to make provision about gender change by married persons and civil partners; to make a minor correction in relation to registration information; and for connected purposes.
- Citation: 2014 asp 5
- Introduced by: Alex Neil
- Territorial extent: Scotland

Dates
- Royal assent: 12 March 2014
- Commencement: 13 March 2014 (sections 34–37); various (rest of act); (Note: Section 36.)
Other legislation
Amends	Registration of Births, Deaths and Marriages (Scotland) Act 1965; Domicile and Matrimonial Proceedings Act 1973; Divorce (Scotland) Act 1976; Marriage (Scotland) Act 1977; Presumption of Death (Scotland) Act 1977
Amended by	Qualifying Civil Partnership Modification (Scotland) Order 2015; Civil Partnership (Scotland) Act 2020
Relates to	Marriage (Scotland) Act 1977; Civil Partnership Act 2004

Status: Amended

History of passage through the Parliament

Text of statute as originally enacted

Revised text of statute as amended

Text of the Marriage and Civil Partnership (Scotland) Act 2014 as in force today (including any amendments) within the United Kingdom, from legislation.gov.uk.

The Marriage and Civil Partnership (Scotland) Act 2014 (Note: Scottish Gaelic: Achd Pòsaidh is Com-pàirteachasan Sìobhalta (Alba) 2014, pronounced [axk ˈpʰɔːs̪əɣ ɪs̪ kʰɔmˈpʰaːrˠʃt̪əxəs̪ən ˈʃiːvəl̪ˠt̪ə ˈal̪ˠapə]; Scots: Mairiage and Ceevil Pairtnery (Scotland) Act 2014, pronounced [ˈmeːrɪdʒ an(d) ˈsiːvɪl ˈpeːrtnəri ˈskotlən(d) ˈak(t)].) (asp 5) is an act of the Scottish Parliament which allows same-sex couples to marry in Scotland since 16 December 2014.

The bill was introduced to the Scottish Parliament on 26 June 2013 by Alex Neil MSP, the Cabinet Secretary for Health and Wellbeing. The bill passed Stage 3 on 4 February 2014. It received Royal Assent on 12 March 2014.

The act does not contain provisions to allow existing civil partnerships registered in Scotland to be converted into marriage, but includes provision for its later introduction into law; it permitted those already in civil partnership with one another to marry without first dissolving the mutual civil partnership.

== Background ==
As marriage is not reserved to the Parliament of the United Kingdom, the Scottish Parliament has legislative competence to make changes to marriage law.

On 17 March 2009, the Petitions Committee unanimously agreed to question the Scottish Government on whether and when it planned to amend the Marriage (Scotland) Act 1977 to allow same sex marriages. They also requested that a reason be provided if an amendment could not be considered.

In March 2009, shortly before submission of the LGBT Network's petition to the Scottish Parliament, NUS Scotland established an Equal Marriage Campaign, launching a similar petition to the Scottish Parliament and calling for the amendment of legislation to allow same-sex marriage and mixed-sex civil partnerships in Scotland, although the petition itself did not distinguish between civil and religious marriage. This campaign attracted the support of a number of MSPs and MEPs, as well as activist organisations and individuals. The petition closed on 1 September 2009, having gathered 1,317 signatures. On 8 September the Petitions Committee convened after a summer recess, and agreed to contact the Government seeking responses to specific points raised in both petitions and the discussion.

On 1 December 2009, the Petitions Committee decided to seek a meeting between a government minister and the petitioners, as well as enquire as to whether the Government might consider setting up an advisory committee of interested parties. The Government rejected the petition, as legalising same-sex marriage in Scotland only would require changes in non-devolved matters such as the areas of immigration, pensions and inheritance law all of which would have to be done at national level. The head of the government's equality unit Hilary Third said that although from an equalities point of view "equal marriage is where we want to be" it would be a "difficult situation" if same-sex marriage was legal in Scotland but not England. In 2011 Her Majesty's Government announced a consultation on the legalising of same-sex marriage in England and Wales would be held, and it began in March 2012.

== Consultation ==
From September – December 2011 the Scottish Government held a consultation on the issue. The consultation offered consideration on both removing religious prohibitions for civil partnerships and also legalising same-sex marriage within that country. In the foreword to the consultation document, Deputy First Minister, Nicola Sturgeon stated

"The Scottish Government is choosing to make its initial views clear at the outset of this consultation. We tend towards the view that religious ceremonies for civil partnerships should no longer be prohibited and that same sex marriage should be introduced so that same sex couples have the option of getting married if that is how they wish to demonstrate their commitment to each other. We also believe that no religious body or its celebrants should be required to carry out same sex marriages or civil partnership ceremonies."

Unlike the English and Welsh Consultation, the one for Scotland dealt with the issue of same-sex marriage in a religious context. On 10 December 2011, The Scotsman newspaper reported that some 50,000 responses had been received from within Scotland. In reality, when counting was finished, the total stood at 77,508. The Government presented the results and analysis of the consultation in July 2012. Respondents who opposed the introduction of same sex marriage were in the majority, with 67%.

== Passage through Parliament ==
On 25 July 2012 the Scottish Government announced it would bring forward legislation to legalise both civil and religious same-sex marriage in Scotland. The Government reiterated its intention to ensure that no religious group or individual member of the clergy would be forced to conduct such ceremonies; it also stated its intention to work with Westminster to make necessary changes to the Equality Act to ensure that this would be guaranteed.

On 27 June 2013, the Scottish Government introduced the Marriage and Civil Partnerships (Scotland) Bill in the Scottish Parliament. LGBT rights campaigners, celebrating outside the UK parliament on 15 July 2013 for the clearance of the Marriage (Same Sex Couples) Bill in the House of Lords, declared that they would continue the campaign to extend same-sex marriage rights to both Scotland and Northern Ireland.

The majority of the members of the Scottish Parliament have declared their support for same-sex marriage, including the leader of each party in Parliament: Alex Salmond (SNP; First Minister of Scotland), Johann Lamont (Labour), Ruth Davidson (Conservative), Willie Rennie (Liberal Democrats) and Patrick Harvie (Green).

The bill was fast-tracked through the Scottish Parliament with the aim of achieving Royal Assent for the legislation by March 2014. The Equal Opportunities Committee considered the bill from 5 September to 7 November, with a report published on 8 November. On 20 November, the bill passed Stage 1 with a 98 to 15 vote and 5 abstentions. Of the 98 MSPs that voted "yes" on the bill, 52 were members of the Scottish National Party, 31 were members of the Labour Party, 7 were members of the Conservative Party, 4 were members of the Liberal Democrats Party, 2 were members of the Green Party, and 2 were Independents. Of the 15 MSPs that voted "no" on the bill, 6 were members of the Scottish National Party, 8 were members of the Conservative Party, and 1 was a member of the Labour Party. Of the 5 MSPs that abstained, 2 were members of the Scottish National Party, and 3 were members of the Labour Party.

Marriage and Civil Partnership (Scotland) Bill – Stage 1 (20 November 2013)
Party	In favour	Against	Abstentions
SNP	52: George Adam; Clare Adamson; Christian Allard; Colin Beattie; Marco Biagi; Keith Brown; Margaret Burgess; Aileen Campbell; Roderick Campbell; Willie Coffey; Angela Constance; Bruce Crawford; Graeme Dey; Bob Doris; James Dornan; Jim Eadie; Annabelle Ewing; Linda Fabiani; Joe FitzPatrick; Kenneth Gibson; Rob Gibson; Christine Grahame; Jamie Hepburn; Adam Ingram; Colin Keir; Bill Kidd; Richard Lochhead; Kenny MacAskill; Derek Mackay; Mike MacKenzie; Michael Matheson; Joan McAlpine; Mark McDonald; Christina McKelvie; Aileen McLeod; Fiona McLeod; Stuart McMillan; Alex Neil; Gil Paterson; Dennis Robertson; Shona Robison; Michael Russell; Alex Salmond; Stewart Stevenson; Kevin Stewart; Nicola Sturgeon; John Swinney; David Torrance; Maureen Watt; Sandra White; John Wilson; Humza Yousaf	6: Alasdair Allan; Roseanna Cunningham; Nigel Don; Fergus Ewing; Richard Lyle; John Mason	2: Chic Brodie; Angus MacDonald
Labour	31: Jackie Baillie; Claire Baker; Richard Baker; Jayne Baxter; Claudia Beamish; Neil Bibby; Sarah Boyack; Malcolm Chisholm; Kezia Dugdale; Mary Fee; Neil Findlay; Rhoda Grant; Iain Gray; Mark Griffin; Hugh Henry; Cara Hilton; James Kelly; Johann Lamont; Lewis Macdonald; Ken Macintosh; Jenny Marra; Paul Martin; Margaret McCulloch; Margaret McDougall; Duncan McNeil; Anne McTaggart; Elaine Murray; Graeme Pearson; John Pentland; Drew Smith; David Stewart	1: Elaine Smith	3: Hanzala Malik; Michael McMahon; Siobhan McMahon
Conservative	7: Cameron Buchanan; Jackson Carlaw; Ruth Davidson; Annabel Goldie; John Lamont; Mary Scanlon; John Scott	8: Gavin Brown; Alex Fergusson; Murdo Fraser; Alex Johnstone; Jamie McGrigor; Nanette Milne; Margaret Mitchell; Liz Smith	–
Liberal Democrats	4: Jim Hume; Liam McArthur; Alison McInnes; Willie Rennie	–	–
Green	2: Patrick Harvie; Alison Johnstone	–	–
Independents	2: John Finnie; Jean Urquhart	–	–
Total	98	15	5

The bill returned to the Equal Opportunities Committee for Stage 2. The Committee considered the bill on 19 December 2013, rejecting several amendments proposed by opponents of the legislation. The Committee continued Stage 2 on 16 January 2014. The final Stage 3 debate and vote was held on 4 February 2014. The bill was approved with 105 MSPs in favour and 18 opposed, with no abstentions. The bill received Royal Assent on 12 March 2014 and the first same-sex marriages occurred on 16 December 2014, for partners in a civil partnership who converted into marriage.

Marriage and Civil Partnership (Scotland) Bill – Stage 3 (4 February 2014)
Party	In favour	Against	Absent (Didn't Vote)
SNP	56: George Adam; Clare Adamson; Christian Allard; Colin Beattie; Marco Biagi; Chic Brodie; Keith Brown; Margaret Burgess; Aileen Campbell; Roderick Campbell; Willie Coffey; Angela Constance; Bruce Crawford; Graeme Dey; Nigel Don; Bob Doris; James Dornan; Jim Eadie; Annabelle Ewing; Linda Fabiani; Joe FitzPatrick; Kenneth Gibson; Rob Gibson; Jamie Hepburn; Fiona Hyslop; Adam Ingram; Colin Keir; Bill Kidd; Richard Lochhead; Kenny MacAskill; Gordon MacDonald; Derek Mackay; Mike MacKenzie; Michael Matheson; Stewart Maxwell; Joan McAlpine; Mark McDonald; Christina McKelvie; Aileen McLeod; Fiona McLeod; Stuart McMillan; Alex Neil; Gil Paterson; Dennis Robertson; Shona Robison; Michael Russell; Alex Salmond; Stewart Stevenson; Kevin Stewart; Nicola Sturgeon; John Swinney; David Torrance; Maureen Watt; Paul Wheelhouse; Sandra White; John Wilson	7: Alasdair Allan; Roseanna Cunningham; Fergus Ewing; Richard Lyle; Angus MacDonald; John Mason; Dave Thompson	2: Christine Grahame; Humza Yousaf
Labour	33: Jackie Baillie; Claire Baker; Richard Baker; Jayne Baxter; Claudia Beamish; Neil Bibby; Sarah Boyack; Malcolm Chisholm; Kezia Dugdale; Mary Fee; Patricia Ferguson; Neil Findlay; Rhoda Grant; Iain Gray; Mark Griffin; Hugh Henry; Cara Hilton; James Kelly; Johann Lamont; Lewis Macdonald; Ken Macintosh; Hanzala Malik; Jenny Marra; Paul Martin; Margaret McCulloch; Duncan McNeil; Anne McTaggart; Elaine Murray; Graeme Pearson; John Pentland; Alex Rowley; Drew Smith; David Stewart	3: Elaine Smith; Michael McMahon; Siobhan McMahon	1: Margaret McDougall
Conservative	7: Cameron Buchanan; Jackson Carlaw; Ruth Davidson; Annabel Goldie; John Lamont; Mary Scanlon; John Scott	8: Gavin Brown; Alex Fergusson; Murdo Fraser; Alex Johnstone; Jamie McGrigor; Nanette Milne; Margaret Mitchell; Liz Smith	–
Liberal Democrats	5: Jim Hume; Liam McArthur; Alison McInnes; Willie Rennie; Tavish Scott	–	–
Green	2: Patrick Harvie; Alison Johnstone	–	–
Independents	2: John Finnie; Jean Urquhart	–	–
Total	105	18	3

== See also ==
- Same-sex marriage in Scotland
- Marriage (Same Sex Couples) Act 2013
