= 2011 Scottish Labour leadership election =

Scottish Labour leadership election

2011 Scottish Labour Party leadership election
- 29 October 2011 – 17 December 2011
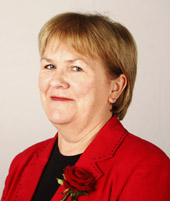

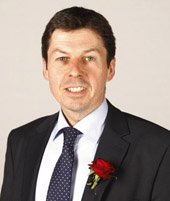

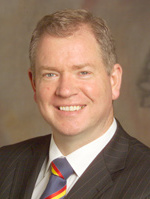
Candidate	Johann Lamont	Ken Macintosh	Tom Harris
Overall Result	51.8%	40.3%	8.0%
Affiliated Unions	65.4%	26.4%	8.2%
Party members	36.5%	53.1%	10.3%
MPs, MSPs & MEPs	53.3%	41.3%	5.3%
Leader before election
Iain Gray
Elected Leader
Johann Lamont

The 2011 Scottish Labour Party leadership election was an internal party election to choose a new leader of the Scottish Labour Party. The election followed the announcement by Iain Gray that he would stand down as leader in the autumn of 2011 following the party's heavy defeat to the Scottish National Party in May's Scottish Parliament general election. Gray won the previous contest in September 2008.

It was the third Scottish Labour leadership election in four years, the first being caused by the resignation of Jack McConnell following the party's defeat in the 2007 Scottish Parliament election, and the second by Wendy Alexander's resignation.

Running concurrently was a deputy leadership election, triggered by Johann Lamont's decision to run in the leadership election.

The leader of the Keep Scotland in Britain campaign was to be decided once the outcome of the Scottish Labour leadership election was known.

Johann Lamont was elected as leader, and Anas Sarwar as deputy leader.

== Timetable ==
- 6 May: Iain Gray announces his postponed resignation as Scottish Labour leader following the party's defeat in the previous day's elections.
- 11 May: Ed Miliband orders a review into the full workings of Scottish Labour, led by Jim Murphy and Sarah Boyack.
- 10 September: The Murphy/Boyack review is published, proposing major changes to Scottish Labour's structures, including the creation of a full Scottish Labour leader to replace the previous post of 'Leader of the Labour Party in the Scottish Parliament'.
- 29 October: A special party conference is held at the Strathclyde Suite in the Glasgow Royal Concert Hall where the changes proposed by the Murphy/Boyack review are officially adopted by the party. The conference also marks the official start of the leadership election.
- 4 November: Nominations from parliamentarians closed.
- 17 December: The result of the elections are due to be announced.

== Candidates and nominations ==
Any Scottish Labour MP (Member of Parliament), MSP (Member of the Scottish Parliament) or MEP (Member of the European Parliament) may stand for election as either leader or deputy leader. Successful nomination requires the support of 12.5% of the total number of Scottish Labour's parliamentarians in the Scottish Parliament, the House of Commons, and the European Parliament, with any candidate needing at least one nomination from two of these three institutions. At the opening of formal nominations at the Scottish Labour conference on 29 October, the party had a total of 80 such parliamentarians, meaning a total of 10 nominations was required.

Once the nomination process by parliamentarians is complete, supporting nominations made be made for each candidate by Scottish Constituency Labour Parties (CLPs), trade unions that are affiliated to the Labour Party, affiliated socialist societies, Scottish Young Labour, and individual local councillors.

This will be the first leadership elections that use this nomination procedure, which was devised by the Review of the Labour Party in Scotland, conducted by Jim Murphy MP and Sarah Boyack MSP following the party's heavy defeat to the Scottish National Party in the Scottish Parliament election held in May 2011.

=== Leadership - nominated candidates ===
At the close of nominations, three candidates had secured the required level of parliamentary nominations to secure a position on the ballot paper.

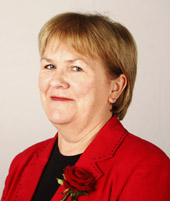
Johann Lamont, Deputy leader and MSP for Glasgow Pollok

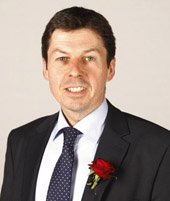
Ken Macintosh, MSP for Eastwood

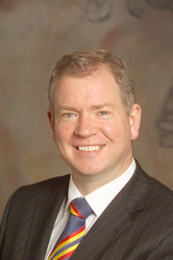
Tom Harris, MP for Glasgow South

==== Tom Harris MP ====
Profile - MP for the Glasgow South constituency since 2001 (Glasgow Cathcart from 2001–2005). Former minister at the Department for Transport.

Candidacy announced - 10 September

Policies - Opposes the Scottish Government's policy on alcohol pricing.

Parliamentary nominations - MPs: Douglas Alexander, Anne Begg, Sheila Gilmore, Tom Greatrex, Tom Harris, Eric Joyce, Michael McCann, Ann McKechin, Iain McKenzie, Ian Murray, Pamela Nash, John Robertson. MEPs: David Martin.

==== Johann Lamont MSP ====
Profile - MSP for the Glasgow Pollok constituency since 1999, Scottish Labour deputy leader since 2008.

Candidacy announced - 3 September

Policies - Opposes the Scottish Government's policy on alcohol pricing.

Parliamentary nominations - MSPs: Jackie Baillie, Richard Baker, Claudia Beamish, Sarah Boyack, Malcolm Chisholm, Helen Eadie, Patricia Ferguson, Neil Findlay, James Kelly, Johann Lamont, Hanzala Malik, Paul Martin, Siobhan McMahon, Duncan McNeil, Anne McTaggart, Elaine Murray, John Pentland, Drew Smith, Elaine Smith, David Stewart. MPs: Katy Clark, Michael Connarty, Cathy Jamieson, Jim McGovern, Sandra Osborne, Fiona O'Donnell, Jim Sheridan.

==== Ken Macintosh MSP ====
Profile - MSP for the Eastwood constituency since 1999.

Candidacy announced - 12 September

Policies - Opposes the Scottish Government's policy on alcohol pricing, return First ScotRail and the Scottish bus network back into public ownership.

Parliamentary nominations - MSPs: Claire Baker, Neil Bibby, Kezia Dugdale, Mary Fee, Mark Griffin, Ken Macintosh, Margaret McCulloch, Margaret McDougall, Jenny Marra, Michael McMahon, John Park, Graeme Pearson, Richard Simpson. MPs: Willie Bain, Gordon Banks, Alistair Darling, Russell Brown, Thomas Docherty, Brian Donohoe, Frank Doran, Gemma Doyle, Mark Lazarowicz, Anne McGuire, Jim Murphy, Frank Roy. MEPs: Catherine Stihler.

=== Deputy leadership - nominated candidates ===
At the close of nominations, three candidates had secured the required parliamentary nominations to achieve a place on the ballot paper.

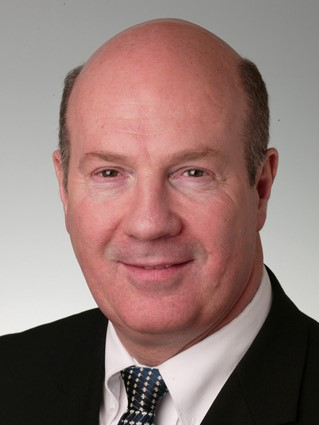
Ian Davidson, MP for Glasgow South West

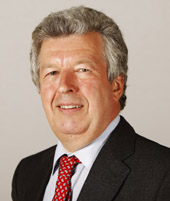
Lewis Macdonald, MSP for North East Scotland

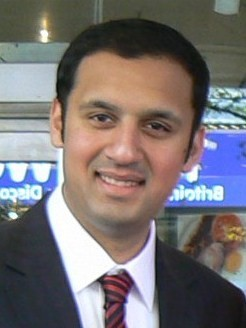
Anas Sarwar, MP for Glasgow Central

==== Ian Davidson MP ====
Profile - MP for the Glasgow South West constituency since 1992, (Glasgow Govan 1992-1997, Glasgow Pollok 1997-2005). Chairman of the Scottish Affairs Select Committee since 2010.

Parliamentary nominations - MSPs: Neil Findlay, Elaine Smith. MPs: Katy Clark, Michael Connarty, Ian Davidson, Brian Donohoe, Jim McGovern, Sandra Osborne, John Robertson, Jim Sheridan. MEPs: David Martin.

==== Lewis Macdonald MSP ====
Profile - MSP for the Aberdeen Central constituency, 1999-2011. MSP for the North East Scotland region since 2011.

Parliamentary nominations - MSPs: Richard Baker, Malcolm Chisholm, Helen Eadie, Mary Fee, Lewis Macdonald, Margaret McCulloch, Margaret McDougall, Elaine Murray, Richard Simpson, David Stewart. MPs: Anne Begg, Frank Doran, Tom Harris.

==== Anas Sarwar MP ====
Profile - MP for the Glasgow Central constituency since 2010.

Parliamentary nominations - MSPs: Jackie Baillie, Claire Baker, Claudia Beamish, Neil Bibby, Kezia Dugdale, Patricia Ferguson, Mark Griffin, James Kelly, Hanzala Malik, Jenny Marra, Paul Martin, Michael McMahon, Siobhan McMahon, Duncan McNeil, Anne McTaggart, John Park, Graeme Pearson, John Pentland, Drew Smith. MPs: Douglas Alexander, Willie Bain, Gordon Banks, Russell Brown, Tom Clarke, Alistair Darling, Thomas Docherty, Gemma Doyle, Sheila Gilmore, Tom Greatrex, Jim Hood, Cathy Jamieson, Eric Joyce, Mark Lazarowicz, Michael McCann, Gregg McClymont, Anne McGuire, Iain McKenzie, Jim Murphy, Ian Murray, Pamela Nash, Fiona O'Donnell, Frank Roy, Anas Sarwar. MEPs: Catherine Stihler.

=== Deputy leadership - unsuccessful candidates ===
Dumfriesshire MSP Elaine Murray sought nomination for the deputy leadership, and had acquired 4 nominations before withdrawing from the contest on 3 November. Following her withdrawal, Murray nominated Lewis Macdonald.

== Hustings ==
In the run up to the opening of the ballot, Scottish Labour will host a series of hustings events across Scotland.

Date	Title	Location	Information/Highlights
Friday 18 November, 19:00	Ethnic Minority Hustings	Glasgow	
Saturday 19 November, 11:00	Youth & Student Hustings	Glasgow	
Sunday 20 November, 14:30	Aberdeen Hustings	Aberdeen	
Tuesday 22 November, 19:00	Edinburgh Hustings	Edinburgh	
Friday 25 November, 19:00	Inverness Hustings	Inverness	
Sunday 27 November, 19:00	Dunfermline Hustings	Dunfermline	
Monday 28 November, 19:00	Glasgow Hustings	Glasgow	
Thursday 1 December, 19:00	Dundee Hustings	Dundee	
Sunday 4 December, 14:30	Stirling Hustings	Stirling	
Tuesday 6 December, 14:30	Ayr Hustings	Ayr	
Thursday 8 December, 19:00	Women's Hustings	Motherwell	

== Result ==
The election was conducted through a postal ballot, and counted using the alternative vote method in an electoral college, with a third of the votes allocated to Labour's MSPs, Scottish MPs and Scottish MEPs, a third to individual members of the Scottish Labour Party, and a third to individual members of affiliated organisations, mainly trade unions and socialist societies. Under the alternative vote, the candidate with the fewest votes is eliminated at each round until one candidate has a majority of votes (i.e., one more than half).

=== Leadership ===
Candidate	Affiliated members (33.3%)	Individual members (33.3%)	Elected members (33.3%)	Total
Johann Lamont MSP	65.4%	36.5%	53.3%	51.8%
Ken Macintosh MSP	26.4%	53.1%	41.3%	40.3%
Tom Harris MP	8.2%	10.3%	5.3%	8.0%

=== Deputy Leadership ===
Candidate	Affiliated members (33.3%)	Individual members (33.3%)	Elected members (33.3%)	Total
Anas Sarwar MP	25.6%	61.0%	66.7%	51.1%
Ian Davidson MP	61.1%	25.4%	13.3%	33.3%
Lewis MacDonald MSP	13.3%	13.6%	20.0%	15.6%

== See also ==
- 2011 Scottish Conservatives leadership election
- 2011 Scottish Liberal Democrats leadership election
- 2008 Scottish Labour leadership election
- 2008 Scottish Labour deputy leadership election
