= 2015 Scottish Labour leadership election =

Scottish Labour leadership election

2015 Scottish Labour Party leadership election
- 21 July 2015 – 15 August 2015
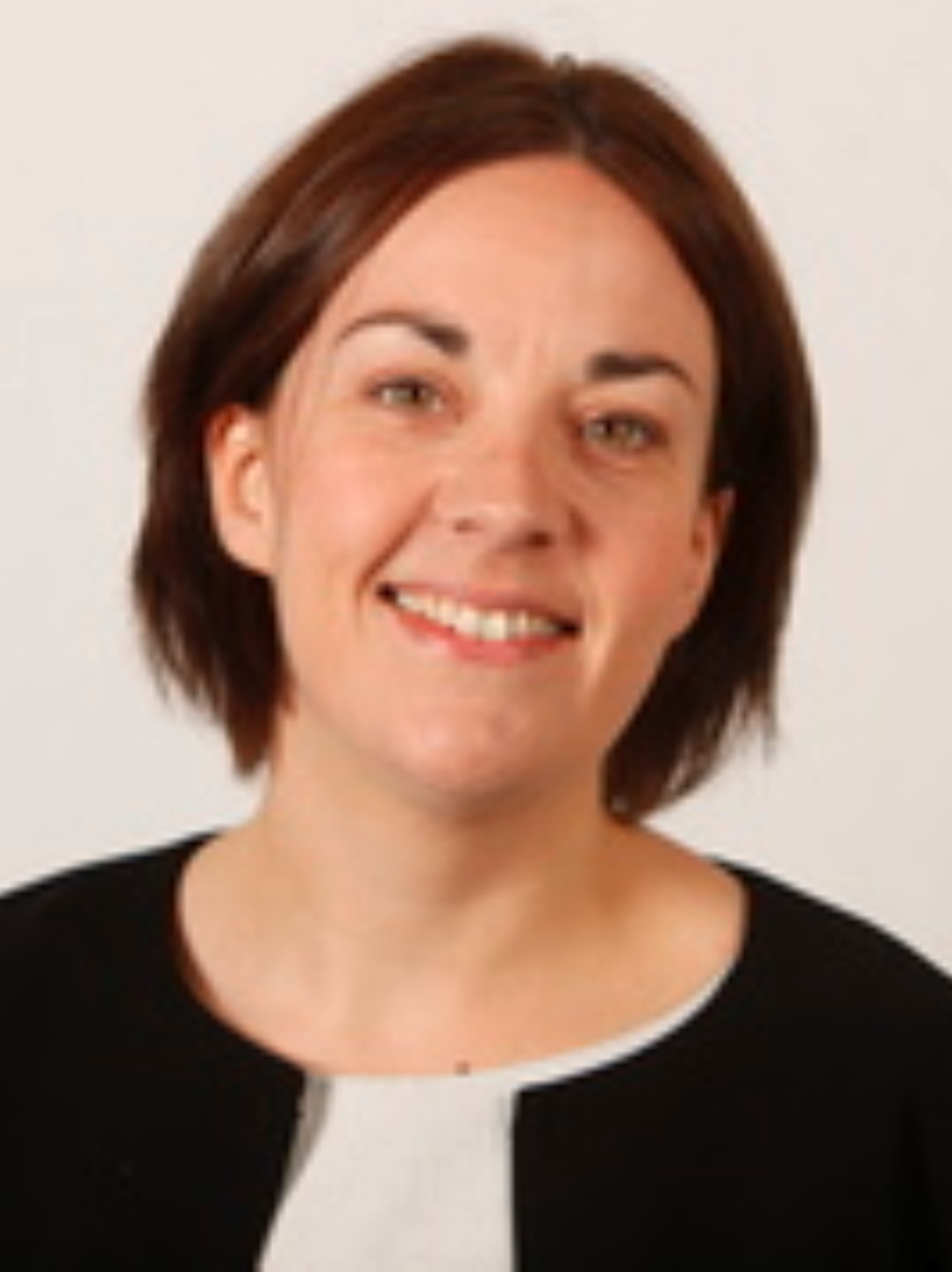

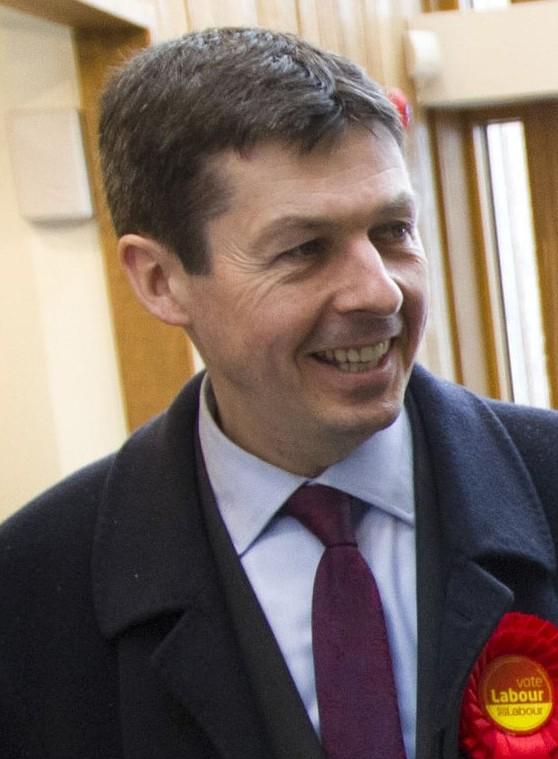
Candidate	Kezia Dugdale	Ken Macintosh
First preferences	72.1%	27.9%
Leader before election
Iain Gray (acting); previously Jim Murphy
Elected Leader
Kezia Dugdale

The 2015 Scottish Labour Party leadership election was formally triggered on 16 May 2015 by the resignation of Jim Murphy as Leader of the Scottish Labour Party, which took effect on 13 June 2015, following the party's defeat at the 2015 general election. A new leader and deputy leader would be chosen following the resignations of Jim Murphy and Kezia Dugdale. In the meantime, former Scottish Labour leader Iain Gray took over as acting leader. On 15 August, Dugdale was elected to lead the party, while Alex Rowley was chosen to become her deputy.

== Background ==
Jim Murphy announced his decision to resign on 16 May 2015 after narrowly surviving a vote of no confidence (17-14) at a meeting of the Scottish Labour party's Scottish Executive Committee (SEC) in Glasgow.

Murphy had faced calls to resign from several MSPs, trade unions and former MPs in the wake of his party's near wipeout at the general election. Murphy lost his seat in the 2015 general election as the Scottish National Party won 56 of the 59 Scottish seats, leaving Labour with a single member of parliament in Scotland. His deputy, Kezia Dugdale MSP, would normally become acting leader until a permanent successor is found, but as she resigned the Deputy Leadership in order to run for the Leadership, former Scottish Labour Leader Iain Gray became acting leader.

== Procedure ==
Former Scottish Labour Leader Iain Gray took over as acting leader, as deputy leader Kezia Dugdale handed in her resignation as deputy leader in order to stand in the race to replace Murphy.

Nominations opened at 5 pm on Monday 15 June; the close of nominations happened at 12 pm on Friday 19 June. Supporting Nominations open at 5 pm on Friday 19 June. Every CLP, Councillor and Affiliated Organisation has a right to cast a supporting nomination for their preferred candidate. The Scottish Labour Party moved to the One Person, One Vote system that is used to elect the UK Labour Party Leader. Candidates for Leader must be already elected as either an MP, MSP or MEP. Candidates for Deputy Leader must be already elected as either an MP, MSP, MEP or Councillor. Leadership nominees must achieve 15% of support of MSPs, MPs and MEPs. Deputy Leadership nominees must also achieve 15% support of MSPs, MPs and MEPs or 15% of Councillors. The previous requirement to have at least one nomination from two of the three Parliamentary groups no longer applies.

Unlike previous leadership elections, this election was held on a one-person-one-vote basis. There are three sets of people who can vote:

- Labour Party members
- Affiliated supporters (people who've signed up as a Labour Party supporter through one of Scottish Labour's affiliated organisations or unions)
- Registered supporters (people who've registered that they support the Labour Party by signing up online and paying a one-off minimum fee of £3)

On 15 August, Dugdale was elected to lead the party, while Alex Rowley was chosen to become her deputy.

=== Proposal for change ===
On 27 May 2015, Macintosh wrote to the outgoing leader Jim Murphy, the Chair of the Scottish Executive Committee, and to the General Secretary of the Scottish Labour Party to ask for changes to be made to the way a new party leader is elected. In the open letter, Macintosh asked that Scottish Labour Party elect its new leader by using a One Member One Vote system and that they move to a system of open primaries. He proposed that Scottish Labour offers people who aren't members an opportunity to join the party as a supporter, so that they are eligible to vote in the leadership election. He also asked that they have the contest before the summer, which would be different from the leadership elections for the national Labour Party. He also argued that the problems facing Scottish Labour won't just be remedied by electing a new leader but that the party needed radical change to repair its relationship with the people in Scotland.

On 13 June 2015, alongside Murphy's resignation as Leader taking effect, the Scottish Executive Committee agreed to adopt the One Member One Vote system that the UK-wide contest is using, moving away from the electoral college system that was used up until December 2014's contest.

=== Timetable ===
The leader and deputy leader contests took place simultaneously. Here is the timetable:

- Monday 15 June 2015 - Nominations open for Leader and Deputy Leader
- Friday 19 June 2015 (12:00) - Nominations (Leader and Deputy Leader) Close. Validly nominated candidates for Leadership to be published.
- Friday 19 June 2015 (17:00) - Supporting nominations open
- Monday 22 June 2015 - Hustings period opens
- Monday 13 July 2015 (17:00) - Last date to join as member, affiliated supporter, or registered supporter, in order to vote in the Leadership ballot.
- Friday 17 July 2015 (12:00) - Supporting nominations close
- Monday 20 July 2015 - Ballot opens
- Friday 14 August 2015 - Ballot closes
- Saturday 15 August 2015 - Result announced

== Candidates ==
=== Leadership ===
On 18 May 2015, the day after the Jim Murphy's resignation speech, the Irish bookmaker Paddy Power gave the following odds for next Scottish Labour leader: 1/2 Kezia Dugdale; 2/1 Neil Findlay; 5/1 Ken Macintosh; 10/1 Jackie Baillie; 16/1 Anas Sarwar; 20/1 Jenny Marra; 20/1 Sarah Boyack; 20/1 Gordon Brown; 25/1 Ian Murray; 25/1 Douglas Alexander; and 100/1 Ian Smart.

The number of MSPs next to the leadership candidate's name below includes the actual candidate too, as they can count as one of the MSPs needed.

Candidates must be MSPs, MPs, or MEPs. A candidate needs 15% of the support of MSPs, MPs, and MEPs (7 MSPs, MPs, or MEPs), in order to be nominated. There are also "Supporting Nominations" from Constituency Labour Parties, Councillors, or Supporting Affiliates. These are an indication of how widely spread throughout the party a candidate's support is.

==== Declared ====
Map of CLP endorsements.

- Kezia Dugdale, former Deputy Leader of the Scottish Labour Party and MSP for the Lothian Region
  - MSP nominations (29): Jackie Baillie, Claire Baker, Richard Baker, Jayne Baxter, Claudia Beamish, Neil Bibby, Sarah Boyack, Malcolm Chisholm, Mary Fee, Patricia Ferguson, Neil Findlay, Rhoda Grant, Iain Gray (incumbent Acting Leader of the Scottish Labour Party; former Leader of the Labour Group in the Scottish Parliament from 2008–2011), Mark Griffin, Cara Hilton, James Kelly, Johann Lamont (former Leader of the Scottish Labour Party from 2011 to 2014), Lewis Macdonald, Hanzala Malik, Jenny Marra, Paul Martin, Duncan McNeil, Elaine Murray, Alex Rowley, Richard Simpson, Drew Smith, Elaine Smith, David Stewart
  - MP nominations (1): Ian Murray
  - MEP nominations (1): Catherine Stihler
  - CLP supporting endorsements (47): Aberdeen Central, Aberdeen South and North Kincardone, Airdrie and Shorts, Almond Valley, Angus North and Mearns, Angus South, Argyll and Bute, Ayr, Banffshire and Buchan Coast, Carrick, Cumnock and Doon Valley, Clydesdale, Cowdenbeath, Cumbernauld and Kilsyth, Cunninghame South, Dumbarton, Dumfriesshire, Dundee City East, Dundee City West, Dunfermline, Edinburgh Central, Edinburgh Eastern, Edinburgh Northern and Leith, Edinburgh Western, Ettrick, Roxburgh and Berwickshire, Glasgow Anniesland, Glasgow Cathcart, Glasgow Kelvin, Glasgow Maryhill and Springburn, Glasgow Pollok, Glasgow Provan, Glasgow Shettleston, Glasgow Southside, Greenock and Inverclyde, Hamilton, Larkhall and Stonehouse, Inverness and Nairn, Kilmarnock and Irvine Valley, Linlithgow, Midlothian South, Tweeddale and Lauderdale, Na h-Eileanan an Iar, North East Fife, Paisley, Perthshire North, Perthshire South and Kinross-shire, Renfrewshire South, Rutherglen, Strathkelvin and Bearsden, Uddingston and Bellshill
  - Councillor supporting endorsements (78): James Adams, Shamin Akhtar, Norma Austin Hart, Ralph Barker, Alex Bennett, Martin Brennan, Walter Brogan, Jackie Burns, Bill Butler, John Cairney, Scott Carle, Andrew Carmichael, Gail Casey, Maureen Child, Pamela Clearie, Russell Clearie, Gerry Convery, Joseph Cullinane, Malcolm Cunning, Stephen Curran, Kirsty Darwent, Maureen Devlin, Jim Docherty, Archie Dryburgh, Alison Evison, Judith Fisher, Andy Forrest, Marie Garrity, Rhondda Geekie, Linda Gow, David Graham, Stephanie Griffin, Gary Guichan, Lynsey Hamilton, Lesley Hinds, Mark Hood, Christopher Kelly, Paul Kelly, Matt Kerr, Gerard Killen, Yvonne Kucuk, Jenny Laing, Lesley Laird, Monica Lennon, Gerald Leonard, Sam Love, Joe Lowe, Mark Macmillan, Sean Marshall, Edward McAvoy, Jim McCabe, Brian McCaig, Catherine McClymont, Lesley McDonald, Janice McGinlay, Michelle McGinty, Alex McInnes, Brian McKenna, Denis McKenna, Helen McKenna, David McLachlan, Frank McNally, John McNamee, Heather McVey, Rita Miller, Alice Marie Mitchell, Alan Moir, Jim Muirhead, Ian Perry, Keith Robson, Colin Smyth, Helen Stephen, Angela Taylor, Bert Thomson, Frank Toner, Brian Wallace, Tommy Williams, Willie Young
  - Supporting affiliate endorsements (10): Community Union, CWU, NUM, Scottish Labour Students, Scottish Young Labour, Socialist Health Association, TSSA, UCATT, UNISON, USDAW
- Ken Macintosh, Shadow Cabinet Secretary for Social Justice, Communities and Pensioners' Rights and MSP for Eastwood
  - MSP nominations (8): Margaret McCulloch, Margaret McDougall, Michael McMahon, Siobhan McMahon, Anne McTaggart, Graeme Pearson, John Pentland
  - CLP supporting endorsements (5): Clackmannanshire and Dunblane, Eastwood, Kirkcaldy, Midlothian North and Musselburgh, Moray
  - Councillor supporting endorsements (19): Kay Carrington, Betty Cunningham, Jim Fletcher, Elaine Green, Kenny Hay, Alan Lafferty, Kathleen Martin, Stephen McCabe, Maureen McKay, Eric Milligan, Mary Montague, Jim Montgomerie, Sean Morton, George Redmond, Philip Saxton, Jim Sharkey, Derek Stewart, Graeme Tait, Richard Tullett
  - Supporting affiliate endorsements (1): Scottish Co-Operative Party

==== Declined ====
- Neil Findlay, MSP for the Lothian Region and leadership candidate in 2014 (endorsed Kezia Dugdale)

=== Deputy Leadership ===
The number of MSPs next to the Baker's and Rowley's names and the number of Councillors next to Matheson's name below includes the actual candidate too, as they can count as one of the MSPs/Councillors needed.

Candidates must be MSPs, MPs, MEPs, or Councillors. A candidate needs 15% of the support of MSPs, MPs, and MEPs (7 MSPs, MPs, or MEPs) or 15% of the support of Councillors (60 Councillors), in order to be nominated. There are also "Supporting Nominations" from Constituency Labour Parties or Supporting Affiliates. These are an indication of how widely spread throughout the party a candidate's support is.

==== Declared ====
- Richard Baker, MSP for North East Scotland
  - MSP nominations (12): Jackie Baillie, Claire Baker, Mary Fee, Iain Gray, James Kelly, Paul Martin, Michael McMahon, Siobhan McMahon, Elaine Murray, Graeme Pearson, David Stewart
  - MP nominations (1): Ian Murray
  - MEP nominations (1): Catherine Stihler
  - Councillor nominations (30): Yvonne Allan, Angela Blacklock, Scott Carle, Maureen Child, Stuart Clark, Neil Cooney, Karen Doran, Alison Evison, Gordon Graham, Ross Grant, George Greenshields, Paul Godzik, Norma Austin Hart, Ricky Henderson, Len Ironside, Karen Keil, Jenny Laing, Graeme Lawrence, Elaine McDougall, Martin McElroy, Norma McGovern, Eric Milligan, Ramsay Milne, Jean Morrison, Jim Muirhead, Peter Nolan, Ian Perry, Keith Robson, Angela Taylor, Gavin Yates
  - CLP supporting endorsements (22): Aberdeen Central, Aberdeen Donside, Aberdeen South and North Kincardine, Aberdeenshire East, Aberdeenshire West, Angus North and Mearns, Banffshire and Buchan Coast, Clackmannanshire and Dunblane, Cumbernauld and Kilsyth, Cunninghame South, Dumbarton, Eastwood, Edinburgh Central, Edinburgh Eastern, Glasgow Provan, Midlothian South, Tweeddale and Lauderdale, Moray, Na h-Eileanan an Iar, North East Fife, Renfrewshire South, Rutherglen, Uddingston and Bellshill
- Gordon Matheson, Leader of the Glasgow City Council since May 2010
  - MSP nominations (2): John Pentland, Richard Simpson
  - Councillor nominations (108): George Adam, James Adams, Johanna Boyd, Philip Braat, Martin Brennan, Maureen Burke, Jackie Burns, Andrew Burns, John Caldwell, Liz Cameron, Paul Carey, Andrew Carmichael, Pamela Clearie, Russell Clearie, Jim Clocherty, James Coleman, Gerry Convery, Margaret Cooper, James Coyle, William Crawford, Gordon Cree, Barney Crockett, Malcolm Cunning, Stephen Curran, Gilbert Davidson, Margaret Devine, Eddie Devine, Elaine Dinwoodie, Frank Docherty, Jim Docherty, Gerry Dorrian, Archie Dryburgh, Alan Falconer, Jonathan Findlay, Judith Fisher, Marie Garrity, Rhondda Geekie, Emma Gillan, Eddie Grady, Archie Graham (husband of Johann Lamont), Anne Hall, Lynsey Hamilton, Maureen Henry, Mike Holmes, John Hood, Rashid Hussain, Lillian Jones, John Kane, Christopher Kelly, John Kelly, Matt Kerr, Gerard Killen, John Knapp, Jeff Leaver, Terry Loughran, Joe Lowe, Mark Macmillan, George Mair, Sean Marshall, John Martin, Edward McAvoy, Jim McCabe, Stephen McCabe, Brian McCaig, Catherine McClymont, Lesley McDonald, John McDowall, John McGhee, Neil McGhee, Janice McGinlay, Alex McInnes, Maureen McKay, Pauline McKeever, Joe Mcllwee, John McNamee, William Menzies, Alan Moir, Robert Moran, Sam Mullin, Alex Murrin, Martin Neill, Ronnie Nicholson, Michael O'Donnell, Paul O'Kane, Lawrence O'Neill, Martin Rhodes, Russell Robertson, Paul Rooney, Martin Rooney, James Scanlon, Maureen Sharkey, Manjinder Shergill, Christine Simpson, Anne Simpson, James Smith, Colin Smyth (former General Secretary of the Scottish Labour Party), Helen Stephen, Allan Stewart, David Stitt, Graeme Tait, Fariha Thomas, Ted Thompson, Bert Thomson, Richard Tullett, Una Walker, Willie Young, Kenny Young
  - CLP supporting endorsements (12): Argyll and Bute, Dumfriesshire, Glasgow Anniesland, Glasgow Cathcart, Glasgow Kelvin, Glasgow Southside, Greenock and Inverclyde, Hamilton, Larkhall and Stonehouse, Inverness and Nairn, Kilmarnock and Irvine Valley, Perthshire North, Perthshire South and Kinross-shire
  - Supporting affiliate endorsements (3): Community Union, Scottish Labour Students, Scottish Young Labour
- Alex Rowley, MSP for Cowdenbeath
  - MSP nominations (10): Jayne Baxter, Claudia Beamish, Malcolm Chisholm, Neil Findlay, Cara Hilton, Hanzala Malik, Margaret McCulloch, Anne McTaggart, Elaine Smith
  - Councillor nominations (74): Tom Adams, John Bell, Alex Bennett, Allyson Black, Tony Boyle, Lesley Brennan, Margaret Brisley, Lawrence Brown, Pat Callaghan, Alex Campbell, William Campbell, Kay Carrington, Harry Cartmill, Gail Casey, Bob Chadha, Alan Clinch, Aileen Colleran, Altany Craik, Neil Crooks, Joseph Cullinane, David Dodds, Kenny Earle, Linda Erskine, Peter George, Callum Gillies, David Graham, Stephanie Griffin, Gary Guichan, Charles Haffey, Judy Hamilton, Jim Harte, John Hendry, William Hogg, Mark Hood, Dave King, Yvonne Kucuk, Lesley Laird, Helen Law, Jim Leishman, Peter Lockhart, Sam Love, Archie Maclellan, Craig R. Martin, Frank McAveety, Corrie McChord, Brian McGinley, Jim Montgomerie, Angela Moohan, Kay Morrison, Nathan Morrison, Jock Munro, Gordon Munro, Rosemary Murray, David O'Neill, Pat O'Rorke, Billy Pollock, Bryan Pottinger, Hanif Raja, George Redmond, David Ross, Margot Russell, Philip Saxton, Kenneth Selbie, Jim Sharkey, Mike Shirkie, Ian Sloan, Peter Sullivan, Brian Thomson, Frank Toner, Alistair Watson, Tommy Williams, John Wincott, Bob Young, Jim Young
  - CLP supporting endorsements (19): Almond Valley, Angus South (Scottish Parliament constituency), Ayr, Carrick, Cumnock and Doon Valley, Clydesdale, Cowdenbeath, Dundee City East, Dundee City West, Dunfermline, Edinburgh Western, Ettrick, Roxburgh and Berwickshire, Glasgow Maryhill and Springburn, Glasgow Pollok, Glasgow Shettleston, Kirkcaldy, Linlithgow, Midlothian North and Musselburgh, Paisley, Strathkelvin and Bearsden
  - Supporting affiliate endorsements (8): ASLEF, CWU, NUM, Scottish Co-Operative Party, Socialist Health Association, TSSA, UCATT, UNISON

== Results ==
=== Leadership ===
Candidate	Total
Candidate	%
Kezia Dugdale	72.1%
Ken Macintosh	27.9%

=== Deputy Leadership ===
==== First round ====
Candidate	Total
Candidate	%
Alex Rowley	37.4%
Gordon Matheson	32.2%
Richard Baker	30.4%

==== Second round ====
Candidate	Total
Candidate	%
Alex Rowley	55.5%
Gordon Matheson	44.5%

== See also ==
- 2015 Labour Party leadership election (UK)
- 2015 Labour Party deputy leadership election
