= Organisation of Scottish Labour =

UK Labour Party body established 1917

The Organisation of Scottish Labour is a body established under the national rules of the UK Labour Party.

== Timeline ==
Origins and evolution of Scottish Labour

- In August 1888, after contesting the Mid Lanarkshire by-election, Keir Hardie co-founded with Liberal MP Robert Cunninghame-Graham the Scottish Labour Party (1888) with the support of the Scottish Miners' Federation, local trade unions, the Dundee Radical Association, the Scottish Home Rule Association, Crofters Party MPs, and the Scottish Land Restoration League.
- In December 1888, the Scottish Socialist Federation (SSF) was formed by members of the Social Democratic Federation.
- In August 1891, the Scottish United Trades Councils Labour Party (SUTCLP) was formed.
- In July 1892 general election, the SUTCLP gained support from the SSF.
- In January 1893, Keir Hardie and others formed the Independent Labour Party (ILP).
- In March 1893, the SUTCLP dissolved, advising members to join the ILP.
- In 1893, the Scottish Socialist Federation affiliated with the ILP.
- In 1894, the Scottish Labour Party of 1888 had by then made little impact and dissolved itself into the ILP.
- In March 1897, the Scottish Trades Union Congress (STUC) was formed in Glasgow, as a result of a political dispute with the TUC regarding political representation for the Labour movement.
- In 1899, the STUC with the ILP's Scottish branch formed the parliamentary campaign group Scottish Workers' Representation Committee (SWRC)
- In 1900, the ILP played a central role in the formation of the Labour Representation Committee (LRC) which was created by ILP Chairman Hardie's motion to create a single Labour parliamentary body that was passed at a special conference organised by the TUC. ILP nominee Ramsay MacDonald was elected as Secretary of the LRC.
- In 1906, the LRC is renamed the Labour Party, with the ILP becoming a Labour party affiliate and providing much of its activist base.
- In 1909, the SWRC was dissolved and merged with the Labour Party.
- In 1915, a subordinate Scottish Advisory Council (SAC) was formed by the Labour Party.
- In 1918, Scotland was formalised a "region" in the Labour party constitution and the SAC was renamed as the Scottish Council of the Labour Party
- In 1994, the Scottish Council of the Labour Party was renamed the Scottish Labour Party.
- In 2011, the Scottish Labour Party carried out a review of its organisation and elected its first ever overall leader (Johann Lamont).

== Structure ==
- UK Labour Party Head Office, London
  - UK Labour Leader's Office
- UK National Executive Committee
  - Scottish Labour Party Head Office, Glasgow
    - Scottish Labour Leader's Office
    - Scottish Executive Committee
      - Affiliated STUC trade unions, socialist societies and the Co-operative Party
      - Scottish Policy Forum
        - Policy commissions & local policy forums
      - Scottish Labour Conference
    - Scottish Labour Press Office
    - Labour Support Unit, Scottish Parliament
  - Constituency Labour Parties (CLP)
    - Branch Labour Parties (BLP)

== Scottish Executive Committee ==
The Scottish Executive Committee is the governing body of the Scottish Labour Party, responsible for administrative matters and strategic policy direction. The SEC officially meets every second month, with much of day-to-day party business and operations undertaken in groups and commissions. The SEC has three different membership sections – Constituency Labour Party (CLP) members, elected members and trade unions and affiliates. It is further split into the local government sub-committee and the constitution, fundraising and campaigns working groups.

Membership as of 2021:

Office Bearers

- Cara Hilton – Chair of the Scottish Labour Party
- Karen Whitefield – Vice-chair
- Cathy Peattie – Treasurer

Elected Members

- Anas Sarwar – Leader of the Scottish Labour Party
- Jackie Baillie – Deputy Leader of the Scottish Labour Party
- Ian Murray – Shadow Secretary of State for Scotland
- Maureen Devlin – Local Government
- David Ross – Local Government
- Meta Ramsay – Parliamentary Labour Party (PLP) Group Representative
- Jenny Marra – Scottish Parliament Group Representative
- Mark Griffin – Scottish Parliament Group Representative

Constituency Labour Party members

- Johanna Baxter – West of Scotland/Mid Scotland & Fife
- Cara Hilton – West of Scotland/Mid Scotland & Fife
- Lina Nass – North East Scotland/Highlands & Islands
- Marion Sporing – North East Scotland/Highlands & Islands
- Suzan King – Central Scotland/Glasgow
- James Adams – Central Scotland/Glasgow
- Scott Arthur – Lothians/South of Scotland
- Ann Henderson – Lothians/South of Scotland

Trade Union Section

- Drew Smith – GMB
- Cathy Murphy GMB
- Jackson Cullinane – Unite
- Siobhan McCready – Unite
- Simon Macfarlane – Unison
- Maggie Cook – Unison
- Jacqueline Martin – USDAW
- Karen Whitefield – USDAW
- Cathy Peattie – CWU
- John McCue – ASLEF

Scottish Labour Women's Committee

- Lorna Robertson
- Monique McAdams

Co-operative Party & Socialist Societies

- Ben Procter
- Katherine Sangster

Scottish Young Labour

- Coll Mcail
- Lauren Harper

== Chairs of Scottish Labour ==
	Chair	Vice-chair
1917	Robert Stewart	
1918–1923		
1924	William Shaw	
1925–1928
1929	Joseph Waugh	H. Pilkington
1930		
1931	A. W. Brady	
1932–1936
1937	Mary Auld	
1938	James McInnes	
1939–1944		
1945	John Lang	Jean Mann
1946	John Ross	Sinclair Shaw
1947	R. A. Raffan	
1948–1950		
1951	Margaret Hyde	
1952	Tom Hollywood	
1953	John Lang	
1954	Eustace Willis	Magnus Fairnie
1955	M. McNeill	Robert Young
1956	Robert Young	John Cullion
1957		
1958	Jean Saggar	
1959	John D. Pollock	
1960		
1961	Jenny Auld	
1962	W. J. Fraser	
1963	R. Irvine	
1964	Richard Stewart	
1965	David Lambie	
1966	M. Lonsdale	
1967	A. Bell	
1968	A. Mackie	
1969	J. Reid	
1970	C. Donnett	
1971	John D. Pollock	
1972	P. Talbot	
1973	Allan Campbell McLean	F. Gromill
1974	F. Gromill	Tom Fulton
1975	Tom Fulton	E. McKenzie
1976	Charlotte Haddow	George Robertson
1977	George Robertson	Janey Buchan
1978	Janey Buchan	Sam Gooding
1979	Sam Gooding	Donald Macgregor
1980	Donald Macgregor	
1981	George Galloway	James McCafferty
1982	James McCafferty	Gordon Brown
1983	Gordon Brown	
1984	Doug Henderson	John Walker
1985–1986		
1987	Bill Speirs	
1988		
1989	Mark Lazarowicz	
1990–1994		
1995	Rhona Brankin	
1996–2001
2002	Carol Wright	Richard Leonard
2003	Richard Leonard	Pat Devine
2004	Pat Devine	Sandra Macdonald
2005	Sandra Macdonald	Karie Murphy
2006	Karie Murphy	Stuart Clark
2007	Stuart Clark	Dave Watson
2008	Dave Watson	Claudia Beamish
2009	Claudia Beamish	Philomena Muggins
2010	Philomena Muggins	Victoria Jamieson
2011–12	Victoria Jamieson	Jackson Cullinane
2013	Jackson Cullinane	Jamie Glackin
2014–16	Jamie Glackin	Jacqueline Martin
2017	Linda Stewart	Kevin Lindsay
2018	Linda Stewart	Cathy Peattie
2019	Cathy Peattie	Cara Hilton
2020	Cara Hilton	Ian Miller
2021	Cara Hilton	Karen Whitefield
2022	Karen Whitefield	Scott Arthur

== Scottish Policy Forum ==
The Scottish Policy Forum (SPF) is a body of the Scottish Labour Party responsible for developing a rolling policy programme on devolved matters. The Scottish Annual Conference approves policies of the SPF programme every year with the Scottish Executive Committee (in conjunction with a committee from the Scottish Parliament Labour Group) deciding which items of the programme are to be incorporated in Labour's manifesto for the Scottish Parliament elections. The SPF policy-making process is led by the 80 members elected from all sections of the party. The SPF establishes policy commissions to draw together policy discussion documents for consultation over three stages. The SPF is subordinate and feeds reports to the National Policy Forum.

== General Secretary of the Scottish Labour Party ==
The General Secretary of the Scottish Labour Party, subordinate to the General Secretary of the Labour Party, is the administrative head and the most senior permanent staff member of the Scottish Labour Party. The General Secretary is responsible for running the party's organisation: legal affairs, staff management, campaigns, conferences, and liaising with the UK party. They also act as the Registered Treasurer, responsible for the party's financial accounts.

	General Secretary	Notes
1914–1931	Ben Shaw	
1932–1939	Arthur Woodburn	
1939–1951	John Taylor	
1951–1971	Willie Marshall	
1977–1988	Helen Liddell	
1988–1992	Murray Elder	
1992–1998	Jack McConnell	Left role in 1998 to work for 9 months at lobbying firm Public Affairs Europe Ltd, owned by Beattie Media and Maclay Murray & Spens; In 1999, elected as Motherwell and Wishaw MSP and became First Minister of Scotland in 2001; Elevated to House of Lords as Baron McConnell of Glenscorrodale in 2010
1998–1999	Alex Rowley	Sacked as general secretary after setting out proposals for giving Scottish Labour more freedom from London control Went on to become a Fife councillor, Leader of Fife Council, and MSP for Cowdenbeath; Elected Scottish Labour deputy leader in 2014 however stood down in 2017 following allegations of misconduct from a former partner
1999–2008	Lesley Quinn	Joined the Labour Party as a 16-year-old junior shorthand typist As assistant general secretary, became acting general secretary in June 1999 to coordinate 1999 European election campaign Formally appointed as general secretary in November 1999; Stood down at 2008 Scottish Labour conference in Aviemore in March
2008–2012	Colin Smyth	Dumfries and Galloway councillor for Nith Ward; Elected as a regional member for South Scotland at the 2016 Scottish Parliament election
2012–2013	Brian Roy (acting)	
2013–2014	Ian Price	
2014	Fiona Stanton (acting)	
2014–2019	Brian Roy	
2019–2020	Lorna Finlayson (interim)	
2020	Michael Sharpe	
2021	Drew Smith (Acting)	
2021-2023	James Kelly	
2023-2024	John Paul McHugh	
2024-Present	Kate Watson	

== Staff ==
- Press Office
  - Media Monitoring Unit
  - Rebuttal Unit
  - Regional press teams
- Research Unit (policy and constitutional issues)
- Administrative support
- Scottish Parliamentary Labour Support Unit (formerly SPLP Resource Unit)

	Director of Communications	Notes
1998	Paul McKinney	April 1998 to 21 May 1998; Headhunted by Donald Dewar and Gordon Brown; Ran Labour's Scottish press campaign in the 1992 general election Four years as an aide/researcher to Gordon Brown, alongside Pat McFadden and David Miliband; Head of STV news production until April 1998 Returned to STV from 1998 until 2004; Worked for Oxfam from 2004 until 2006, when he joined Al Jazeera
1998–1999	Lorraine Davidson	July 1998 to July 1999
2000–2002	John Scott	From February 2000
2001–2005	Colin Edgar	
2006–2007	Steven Lawther	
2007	Brian Lironi	
2007	Matthew Marr	
2007	Gavin Yates	
2007–2008	Tony McElroy	
2008	Rami Okasha	
2019	Conrad Landin	

	Secretary of State for Scotland	Under-Secretary of State for Scotland
1997–1999	Donald Dewar	Henry McLeish; Brian Wilson; Helen Liddell
1999–2001	Dr John Reid	Brian Wilson
2001–2003	Helen Liddell	George Foulkes; Anne McGuire
2003–2006	Alistair Darling	Anne McGuire; David Cairns
2006–2007	Douglas Alexander	David Cairns
2007–2008	Des Browne	David Cairns
2008–2010	Jim Murphy	Ann McKechin

Special Advisers to Donald Dewar

As Secretary of State for Scotland (1997–1999):

- Wendy Alexander
- Murray Elder
- David Whitton

As First Minister (1999–2000):

- John Rafferty – Chief of staff
- Philip Chalmers – Head of the Scottish Executive's strategic communications unit (previously director of polling and marketing for the Scottish Labour Party)
- David Whitton
- Brian Fitzpatrick
- John MacLaren
- Professor Donald Maclennan
- Neil Gillam
- Chris Winslow

== Scottish Parliament elections ==
1999

- Matthew Taylor – Election strategist
- Douglas Alexander – Election coordinator
- Donald Dewar – Secretary of State for Scotland
- Gordon Brown – Chancellor of the Exchequer
- Brian Wilson – Minister of State for Scotland
- John Reid – Minister of State for Transport
- Alex Rowley – General Secretary
- Lesley Quinn – Assistant General Secretary
- Paul McKinney – Head of communications
- David Whitton – Media adviser to Donald Dewar
- Pat McFadden – Policy adviser to Donald Dewar
- John Rowan – Scottish Telephone Bank Organiser
- Hilary Perrin – Tours
- Bridget Sweeny – Visits
- Ian Austin – Deputy director of communications
- Ed Miliband – Rebuttal
- John Rafferty – Chief of staff to Donald Dewar
- Ann-Marie Whyte – Administration and office manager
- Kevin Reid and Suzanne Hilliard – Media monitoring
- Chris Winslow – Campaigner and parliamentary researcher to John Maxton MP
- Willie Sullivan – Development officer

2003

- Jack McConnell – Leader and First Minister of Scotland
- Jonathan Ashworth – Labour Party economics and welfare policy officer
- Gordon Brown – Chancellor of the Exchequer
- Lesley Quinn – General Secretary

2007

- Jack McConnell – Leader and First Minister of Scotland
- John McTernan – Campaign coordinator
- George Foulkes, Baron Foulkes of Cumnock – Campaign vice-chair
- Tony Blair – Prime Minister
- Gordon Brown – Chancellor of the Exchequer
- Douglas Alexander – Secretary of State for Scotland
- Lesley Quinn – General Secretary

2011

- Iain Gray MSP – Leader
- Simon Pia – Spokesperson
- Michael Marra – Speechwriter
- John Park MSP – Campaign coordinator
- Tom Greatrex MP – Campaign strategist
- Kenny Young – Press Officer
- Colin Smyth – General Secretary
- Rami Okasha – Head of communications
- Sarah Metcalfe – Head of research
- Adele Black – Diary secretary
- Pat Gordon – Assistant and election agent

2016

- Kezia Dugdale MSP – Leader
- Alex Rowley MSP – Deputy leader
- James Kelly MSP – Campaign coordinator
- Brian Roy – General Secretary

2021

- Anas Sarwar MSP – Leader
- Jackie Baillie MSP – Deputy leader
- Kate Watson – Campaign coordinator
- Drew Smith – Acting General Secretary

== Party finance ==
Donors

- Brian Dempsey
- Willie Haughey
- John Milligan

2010 general election expenditure: £968,000

Year	Income	Expenditure
2010	706,738	599,951
2009	387,722	307,925
2008	396,159	455,699
2007	1,029,358	940,851
2006	396,777	471,698
2005	523,523	437,219
2004	318,609	305,120
2003	858,547	920,233
2002	353,342	320,669

== Books ==
- Hassan, Gerry (2004) (ed.) The Scottish Labour Party. Edinburgh University Press.
