= Siobhan McMahon =

British politician (born 1984)

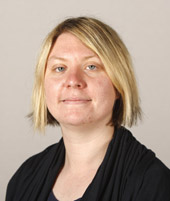
- McMahon in 2011

Member of the Scottish Parliament for Central Scotland (1 of 7 Regional MSPs)
- In office 5 May 2011 – 24 March 2016

Personal details
- Born: Siobhan Marie McMahon; 4 July 1984 (age 42) Lanarkshire, Scotland
- Party: Scottish Labour
- Spouse: John Wright
- Children: 1 daughter
- Education: Glasgow Caledonian University

Siobhan Marie McMahon (born 4 July 1984) is a Scottish Labour Party politician who served as a regional list Member of the Scottish Parliament (MSP) for the Central Scotland region from 2011 to 2016.

== Education and early career ==
McMahon graduated from Glasgow Caledonian University in 2006 with a 2.1 BA Honours degree in Politics with History and Sociology. She worked as a paid researcher for her father, the serving Hamilton North and Bellshill MSP Michael McMahon, who also employed her mother as a paid assistant.

== Member of the Scottish Parliament ==
In the 2011 Scottish Parliament election, McMahon was elected as a regional list MSP, and her father and herself became the first father-and-daughter pair to serve in the Scottish Parliament.

McMahon was involved in Johann Lamont's successful campaign in the 2011 Scottish Labour Party leadership election. Following Lamont's victory, McMahon became her Parliamentary Private Secretary (PPS), with the right to attend meetings of the Scottish Labour Shadow Cabinet.

McMahon was one of three Labour MSPs that voted against the Marriage and Civil Partnership (Scotland) Act 2014, which legislated on civil and religious same-sex marriage.

Following Johann Lamont's resignation as leader following the 2014 Scottish independence referendum, McMahon supported Jim Murphy in the 2014 Scottish Labour Party leadership election, and afterwards he gave her a junior role as Shadow Minister for Youth and Women's Employment, reporting to Shadow Cabinet Secretary for Fair Work, Skills and Training Neil Findlay.

McMahon endorsed Richard Baker, then subsequently Ken Macintosh in the 2015 Scottish Labour Party leadership election. After Macintosh ultimately lost to Kezia Dugdale, McMahon lost her frontbench post in Dugdale's first reshuffle.

In the 2016 Scottish Parliament election, McMahon was succeeded as first on the Central Scotland regional list by Richard Leonard, who became Leader of the Scottish Labour Party following the 2017 Scottish Labour Party leadership election. McMahon was ranked tenth by Labour Party members onto the Labour regional list; as only seven MSPs are elected from the list it was impossible for her to be elected again.

In the 2016 election, McMahon's father lost his Uddingston and Bellshill seat after serving as an MSP since 1999 and she criticised Kezia Dugdale for failing to send condolences to defeated MSPs like her father. In response, Dugdale invited all non-returning, including regional list, MSPs to a dinner she would be hosting the following week.

== Personal life ==
McMahon is married to John Wright, with whom she has one daughter, Anna. McMahon now works in civil society. She has a disability called hemiplegia, a neuromuscular condition which causes weakness along the right-hand side of her body. She is a Christian.
