= Lawther =

Lawther is a surname, and may refer to:

- Alex Lawther (born 1995), English actor
- Anna B. Lawther (1872–1957), American suffragist
- Cameron Lawther (born 1990), English film producer
- Chas Lawther, British-Canadian actor, comedian and writer
- Derek Lawther, British-American soccer coach and businessman.
- Ian Lawther (1939–2010), Northern Irish footballer
- Joe E. Lawther (1876–1943), American banker and mayor of Dallas
- John Lawther, American college basketball coach and professor
- Steven Lawther, former Head of Communications for the Scottish Labour Party
- Will Lawther (1889–1976), British politician and trade union leader
