= Ken Macintosh =

Scottish politician (born 1962)

The Right Honourable The Lord Macintosh of Eastwood PC
- Official portrait, 2026

Presiding Officer of the Scottish Parliament
- In office 12 May 2016 – 13 May 2021
- Monarch: Elizabeth II
- Deputy: Linda Fabiani; Christine Grahame; Lewis Macdonald (interim)
- Preceded by: Tricia Marwick
- Succeeded by: Alison Johnstone
Parliamentary offices
Member of the House of Lords
Lord Temporal
Life peerage 19 August 2026
Member of the Scottish Parliament for West Scotland (1 of 7 Regional MSPs)
In office 5 May 2016 – 5 May 2021
Member of the Scottish Parliament for Eastwood
In office 6 May 1999 – 24 March 2016
Preceded by	Constituency established
Succeeded by	Jackson Carlaw

Personal details
- Born: Kenneth Donald Macintosh; 15 January 1962 (age 64) Inverness, Scotland
- Party: Scottish Labour Co-operative (until 2016, since 2026)
- Other political affiliations: Independent (2016-2026) (Note: Party membership suspended while Presiding Officer)
- Spouse: Claire
- Children: 6
- Education: University of Edinburgh
- Occupation: Television journalist, producer (1987–1999)
- Other offices: 2014–2016: Scottish Labour Spokesperson for Community (Note: Social Justice, Communities and Pensioners' Rights (2014–15))

Kenneth Donald Macintosh, Baron Macintosh of Eastwood (born 15 January 1962) is a Scottish politician who served as the Presiding Officer of the Scottish Parliament from 2016 to 2021. Elected as a member of Labour Co-op, he suspended his party membership on becoming Presiding Officer. Macintosh was a Member of the Scottish Parliament (MSP) from 1999 to 2021, representing the Eastwood constituency from 1999 to 2016, and then the West Scotland region from 2016 to 2021.

Born in Inverness, Macintosh was employed between 1987 and 1999 as a television producer for the BBC, working on its news broadcasts and election coverage. He was first elected in the 1999 Scottish Parliament election as a Scottish Labour and Co-operative Party candidate, and retained his seat of Eastwood in the 2003, 2007 and the 2011 elections, but lost it in the 2016 election. In that election, he was returned on the regional list.

== Early life ==
=== Family background and education ===
Kenneth Donald Macintosh was born on 15 January 1962 in Inverness. Macintosh was educated at the Portree and Oban primary schools before attending the state comprehensive Royal High School, Edinburgh. Both his parents were headteachers. His father, Dr Farquhar Macintosh CBE, was a Gaelic speaker from the Isle of Skye, a leading intellectual in Scottish education, rector of Royal High School and chair of the Scottish Examination Board. His mother, Margaret Macintosh, came from Peebles and was head of Drummond Community High and assistant head of Wester Hailes Education Centre.

=== Early career ===
After graduating from the University of Edinburgh with a History MA (Hons) in 1984, Macintosh became a television producer in 1987 for the BBC News Network. He also worked on Breakfast with Frost, Breakfast News, and the Nine O'Clock News. In addition, he also worked as a researcher on election programmes for both David Dimbleby and Jonathan Dimbleby.

== Political career ==
=== Early parliamentary career ===
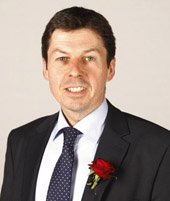
Official parliamentary portrait, 2011

At the 1999 Scottish Parliament election, Macintosh won the Eastwood constituency with a majority of 2,125 votes.

In February 2002, Macintosh was appointed as a ministerial parliamentary aide to Minister for Education and Young People, Cathy Jamieson. He resigned from this role in September 2002 when he voted against the Labour–Liberal Democrat Coalition Scottish Executive over the closure of the A&E department at the Glasgow Victoria Infirmary.

Macintosh became Deputy Convenor on the Standards Committee but had to resign from this position in 2005 after it was revealed he had failed to declare £330 of hospitality from McDonald's within the required time.

In 2006 and 2007 Macintosh has proposed a Member's Bill to the Scottish Parliament providing for the tougher regulation of sunbed parlours, which passed successfully. Since his election in 1999 has been a member of the cross-party group on cancer. From February 2007 to April 2007, he was a ministerial parliamentary aide to First Minister Jack McConnell.

Macintosh was re-elected as MSP for Eastwood at the 2007 election with a narrow majority of 913, where he fought off a strong challenge from the Conservative Party's Jackson Carlaw. After the election, Macintosh was appointed Shadow Minister for Schools and Skills. He considered running for the 2008 Scottish Labour leadership election but pulled out and instead backed Andy Kerr's candidacy.

At the 2011 parliamentary election he once again defeated Jackson Carlaw with an increased majority of 2,012. The swing was 8.7% from Conservative to Labour. Macintosh had feared losing the constituency following boundary changes (with the removal of Barrhead, Neilston and Uplawmoor) which gave a notional Conservative majority of almost 3,500. After the party's loss to the SNP, Macintosh was made Shadow Culture and External Affairs Secretary. Only a week later, however, he took over the Shadow Education portfolio after MSP Malcolm Chisholm resigned over an internal party disagreement.

=== 2011 and 2015 Scottish Labour Party leadership elections ===
Macintosh announced his candidacy in 2011 Scottish Labour leadership election. During a September 2011 BBC Scotland TV interview, Labour leader Ed Miliband was unable to recall Macintosh's name. After the interview, Miliband telephoned to apologise for his mistake and Macintosh tried to downplay the incident saying "I don't think anyone should read anything into it – half the time I can't even remember the names of my own kids." Macintosh officially launched his campaign at Cumbernauld College on 28 October. He described the 2011 election result as a "disaster" and said the party had been too negative: "We need to unite as a party and to start talking positively about our values, what Labour stands for and not just what we are against." He later also said he was a devolutionist, not a unionist. Despite lacking ministerial experience, he was widely seen as a frontrunner. Colleagues who endorsed his bid included his campaign manager Michael McMahon, Claire Baker, Mary Fee, Neil Bibby, Mark Griffin, Kezia Dugdale, Jenny Marra and East Renfrewshire MP Jim Murphy, with whom Macintosh shared his constituency office in Clarkston, East Renfrewshire. In the ensuing leadership election, Macintosh came second to MSP Johann Lamont.

Following Scottish Labour's near wipeout at the 2015 general election, Macintosh decided to stand again for the Scottish Labour leadership, triggered by the resignation of Jim Murphy. Macintosh faced a straight two-way contest with previous deputy leader Kezia Dugdale, who won the leadership.

=== Presiding Officer of the Scottish Parliament ===
At the 2016 Scottish Parliament election, Macintosh lost the Eastwood constituency, being pushed into third place behind the Conservatives' Jackson Carlaw and the Scottish National Party's Stewart Maxwell. However, Macintosh was returned as an additional member on Scottish Labour's West Scotland regional list.

On 12 May 2016, Macintosh was elected as Presiding Officer of the Scottish Parliament with 71 votes on the third round of voting by MSPs. He defeated Murdo Fraser, Johann Lamont, John Scott and Elaine Smith. He suspended his Scottish Labour Co-operative membership upon taking office, per the tradition of the presiding officer being strictly non-partisan.

In early November 2018, Macintosh created controversy when an MSP was sent out of the Holyrood chamber for wearing a rainbow tie in support of LGBTI rights and liberation. Alex Cole-Hamilton, Scottish Liberal Democrat MSP for Edinburgh Western, was told to change the garment by Macintosh during a debate on LGBTI-inclusive education in schools. Macintosh said it flouted rules against "ostentatious campaign material" in the chamber.

In September 2020, Macintosh announced that he would not stand for re-election at the 2021 Scottish Parliament election. In a letter to his constituents, he said: "After much reflection, I have decided not to seek re-election to the Scottish Parliament in May next year. It has been an honour to represent the people of East Renfrewshire and the West of Scotland for the last two decades and I would thank you for the trust you have placed in me."

=== House of Lords ===
Macintosh was given a peerage in the July 2026 political peerages; he was created as Baron Macintosh of Eastwood, of Eastwood in the County of Renfrewshire on 19 August 2026.

== Personal life ==
Macintosh and his wife Claire live in Busby, East Renfrewshire with their six children.

== Notes ==
Political offices
Preceded by Tricia Marwick	Presiding Officer of the Scottish Parliament; 2016–2021	Succeeded by Alison Johnstone
Scottish Parliament
New constituency	Member of the Scottish Parliament for Eastwood; 1999–2016	Succeeded by Jackson Carlaw
Party political offices
Preceded by Sarah Boyack	Scottish Labour Spokesperson for Community; 2014–2016	Succeeded by Alex Rowley
