= Review of the Labour Party in Scotland =

The Murphy and Boyack review was a report compiled by Jim Murphy and Sarah Boyack on the future structure of the Labour Party in Scotland, in response to the landslide victory by the Scottish National Party in the 2011 Scottish Parliament election. The report was presented to party leader Ed Miliband in the autumn of 2011, and was subject to approval by the British Labour Party Conference.

The stated aim of the root and branch review was "to achieve an effective, modern Scottish Labour Party, better able to earn the trust of, and deliver for, the people of Scotland."

CLPs had until 9 September to submit final submissions to the review.

In August 2011 Tom Harris expressed an interest in standing in the election to be the next leader of the Scottish Labour Party, subject to the findings of the Murphy and Boyack review allowing MPs to stand.

== Recommendations ==
- Create, for the first time, an elected Leader of the Scottish Labour Party
- Open that position to all Labour parliamentarians elected in Scotland, provided they commit to seek election as an MSP and First Minister
- Fully devolve the Scottish Labour Party in all Scottish matters, including the rules for the Scottish Leadership election, local government processes and selections, and Scottish Parliament selections
- Begin the process of restructuring local parties in Scotland on the basis of Scottish Parliament seats, not Westminster seats
- Establish a political strategy board, meeting weekly, to develop and co-ordinate political strategy with the Leader, Shadow Secretary of State, the leader of the COSLA Labour Group, a representative of the MEPs, the party chair, and the Scottish General Secretary
- Establish a new political base in Edinburgh
