= Steven Lawther =

Steven Lawther is a sportswriter and former political consultant. He is the author of Unthinkable - Raith Rovers' improbable journey from the bottom of the top of Scottish football published by Pitch Publishing in 2014. The book tells the story of Raith Rovers 1994 League Cup win and was listed on The Scotsman's best Scottish sport reads of 2014. His second book, Arrival - How Scotland's women took their place on the world stage and inspired a generation was published by Pitch Publishing in 2021 and documents the history of the Scotland National Women's Team and their journey to the 2019 World Cup. His third book, We Led in Munich - the unlikely adventures of Raith Rovers in Europe was published by Pitch Publishing in 2025.

Lawther is a former head of communications for the Scottish Labour Party. He came to prominence when he resigned from his post three months before the Scottish Parliament election campaign in 2007. Labour went by on to lose the election to the Scottish National Party. In 2007, Lawther established a research and communications agency called Red Circle Communications. He also conducted opinion polling for the Office of the First Minister and Deputy First Minister of Northern Ireland in relation to the devolution of policing and justice powers in 2010.
