= Neil Bibby =

Scottish Labour Co-op politician

Neil Bibby MSP
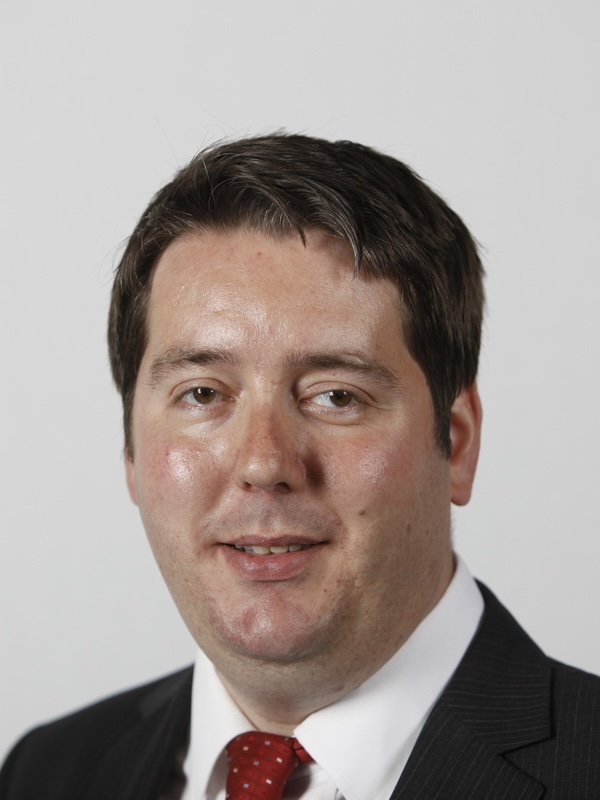
- Bibby in 2021

Member of the Scottish Parliament for West Scotland (1 of 7 Regional MSPs)
- Incumbent
- Assumed office 5 May 2011

Convener of the Public Audit Committee
- Incumbent
- Assumed office 10 June 2026

Scottish Labour portfolios
- 2014–2016: Chief Whip of the Scottish Labour Party
- 2021–present: Shadow Cabinet Secretary for Transport

Personal details
- Born: Neil James Bibby; 6 September 1983 (age 42) Paisley, Renfrewshire, Scotland
- Party: Scottish Labour Co-operative
- Education: Gryffe High School, University of Glasgow

Neil James Bibby (born 6 September 1983) is a Scottish Labour co-operative politician who has served as a Member of the Scottish Parliament (MSP) for the West Scotland region since 2011. He is the current convener for the Public Audit Committee.

== Early life and career ==
Born in Paisley, Bibby grew up in Renfrewshire and went to the University of Glasgow. He had been Chair of Young Labour UK and Chair of Scottish Labour Students. In 2007 he was elected to Renfrewshire Council in the Johnstone North, Kilbarchan and Lochwinnoch ward. Before becoming elected to the Scottish Parliament he worked for Jim Murphy MP and Ken Macintosh MSP.

== Member of the Scottish Parliament ==
Bibby was elected to the Scottish Parliament at the 2011 election to represent the West Scotland region, as the Labour Party returned three members from its regional list. He did not contest the 2012 Renfrewshire Council election, with one of the seats in the ward won for Labour by his father Derek.

Bibby was previously the Scottish Labour Chief Whip and also served in the Shadow Cabinet as Shadow Minister for Education and Young People, Deputy Minister for Education and Shadow Minister for Transport and Town Centres.

Bibby has been a member of the Finance and Constitution Committee as well as a substitute member of the Delegated Powers and Law Reform Committee. Bibby is a member of a number of Cross-Party Groups and is the Deputy Convener of the Cross-Party Group on Visual Impairment, the Cross-Party Group on Towns and Town Centres and the Cross-Party Group on Scottish Horseracing and Bloodstock Industries.

Bibby stood for the Paisley seat in the 2016 Scottish Parliament election. He was defeated by the incumbent SNP MSP George Adam, but was re-elected on the West Scotland regional list.

Bibby nominated Anas Sarwar in the 2021 Scottish Labour leadership election. He is currently Labour's Shadow Cabinet Secretary for Constitution, External Affairs and Culture in the Scottish Parliament.

In February 2018 Bibby received 150 bottles of beer worth approximately £450 from Tennent Caledonian Breweries to promote his proposed Tied Pubs (Code and Adjudicator) (Scotland) Bill.

Bibby backed the UK Government’s decision to introduce means-testing for the Winter Fuel Payment, voting in the Scottish Parliament against calls to reverse the decision.

He was re-elected list MSP in the 2026 Scottish Parliament election.
