= Iain Gray =

Scottish Labour politician

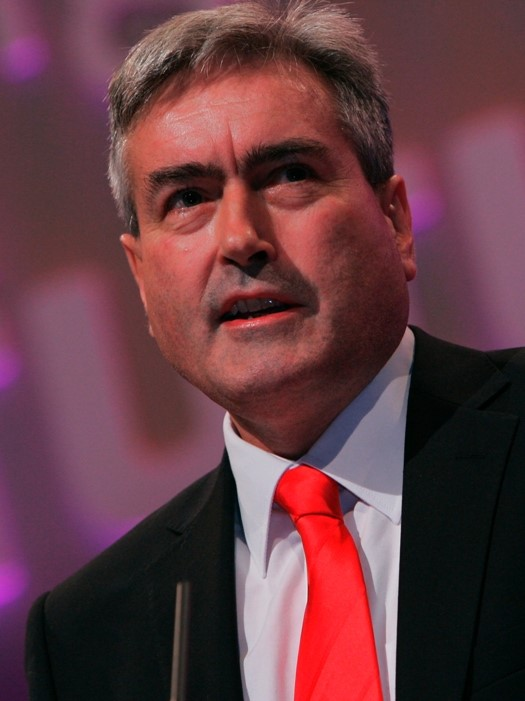
- Gray in 2008

Leader of the Scottish Labour Party (Note: As Leader of the Labour Party in the Scottish Parliament from 2008-2011.)
- Acting; 13 June 2015 – 15 August 2015
- UK party leader: Harriet Harman (acting)
- Preceded by: Jim Murphy
- Succeeded by: Kezia Dugdale
- In office 13 September 2008 – 17 December 2011
- Deputy: Johann Lamont
- UK party leader: Gordon Brown; Harriet Harman (acting); Ed Miliband
- Preceded by: Wendy Alexander (Note: Cathy Jamieson acted from 28 June 2008 to 13 September 2008)
- Succeeded by: Johann Lamont
Ministerial offices
Minister for Enterprise, Transport and Lifelong Learning
In office 3 May 2002 – 21 May 2003
First Minister	Jack McConnell
Preceded by	Wendy Alexander
Succeeded by	Jim Wallace
Minister for Social Justice
In office 22 November 2001 – 3 May 2002
First Minister	Jack McConnell
Preceded by	Jackie Baillie
Succeeded by	Margaret Curran
Parliamentary offices
Member of the Scottish Parliament for East Lothian
In office 3 May 2007 – 5 May 2021
Preceded by	John Home Robertson
Succeeded by	Paul McLennan
Member of the Scottish Parliament for Edinburgh Pentlands
In office 6 May 1999 – 31 March 2003
Preceded by	Constituency established
Succeeded by	David McLetchie
Scottish Labour portfolios
2014–2021	Shadow Cabinet Secretary for Education and Skills (Note: Education and Lifelong Learning (2014–15); Opportunity (2015–16))
2007–2008	Shadow Minister for Enterprise, Energy and Tourism

Personal details
- Born: 7 June 1957 (age 69) Edinburgh, Scotland
- Party: Scottish Labour
- Spouse: Gillianne McCormack
- Education: University of Edinburgh

Iain Cumming Gray (born 7 June 1957) is a Scottish politician who served as Leader of the Scottish Labour Party from 2008 to 2011. He was the Member of the Scottish Parliament (MSP) for the East Lothian constituency from 2007 to 2021, having previously represented Edinburgh Pentlands from 1999 to 2003. A former aid worker and teacher of mathematics and physics, Gray was first elected to the Scottish Parliament in 1999 as MSP for the Edinburgh Pentlands constituency, which he lost to Leader of the Scottish Conservative Party David McLetchie in 2003. Gray was returned to Holyrood in 2007 as MSP for East Lothian. Following Wendy Alexander's resignation as Leader of the Scottish Labour Party in 2008, Gray stood at the subsequent leadership election, and was elected with a 57.8% share of the vote in the second round.

Initially, Gray oversaw some electoral successes for Scottish Labour, such as repelling SNP challenges at the Glenrothes (2008) and Glasgow North East (2009) by-elections, as well as seeing Scottish Labour retain all their 41 seats in the House of Commons at the 2010 general election; despite the election overall resulting in the first UK hung parliament in 36 years, and the Labour Party being defeated after thirteen years in government. The 2011 Scottish Parliament election proved disastrous for the party, which lost 20 constituencies (7 seats overall) as the SNP won an outright majority of seats. Gray himself was only re-elected as MSP for East Lothian with a narrow majority of 151 votes. Gray announced his resignation the day after the result, but remained in post as leader until his successor, Johann Lamont, took over on 17 December 2011.

Due to his experience, Gray was appointed as Acting Leader of the Scottish Labour Party while a leadership and a deputy leadership election were being simultaneously held, on account of deputy leader Kezia Dugdale resigning to run for the leadership and the resignation of previous leader Jim Murphy following Scottish Labour's landslide defeat at the 2015 general election.

== Early life and career ==
Gray was educated at the state comprehensive Inverness Royal Academy and briefly privately at George Watson's College, Edinburgh. He studied physics at the University of Edinburgh before training as a teacher at Moray House College of Education. After graduation, he worked as a mathematics and physics teacher at Gracemount High School in Edinburgh before a teaching stint in Mozambique. He then spent twelve years as the campaigns director for the Scottish arm of the aid charity Oxfam.

== Early political career ==
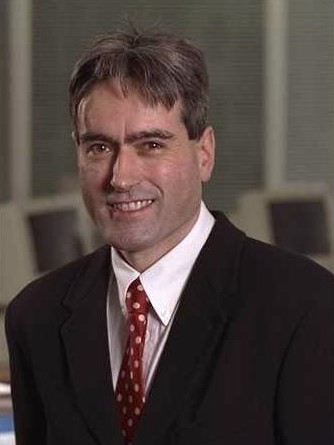
Gray as a government minister

Having previously stood as a candidate in Lothian Regional Council elections, Gray was first elected to the devolved Scottish Parliament at the 1999 Scottish Parliament election. Immediately after his election to Holyrood, he was made a deputy minister in the first Scottish Executive under Donald Dewar.

Following Jack McConnell becoming First Minister in 2001, Gray was promoted to Minister for Social Justice. Following the sudden resignation of Wendy Alexander (following disagreements with McConnell) in 2002, Gray took over her role as Minister for Enterprise, Transport and Lifelong Learning, where he was responsible for overseeing changes to Scottish higher education.

At the 2003 Scottish Parliament election, Gray was defeated by Scottish Conservative leader David McLetchie, who he had stood against in 1999. Leaving Holyrood, he went to work in London as a special adviser to Alistair Darling, who was Secretary of State for Scotland, and initially announced that he would not be seeking re-election.

Having subsequently a change of mind, he was selected as the official Labour candidate for East Lothian for the 2007 election and subsequently won. Gray was appointed as Scottish Labour's Shadow spokesman for enterprise, energy and tourism upon his return to Holyrood.

== Leader of the Scottish Labour Party ==
Following the resignation of Wendy Alexander over a foreign donation scandal, Gray announced in July 2008 that he would stand in the contest to find the next Leader of the Labour group in the Scottish Parliament, and was elected to this post in September 2008.

In December 2010, Iain Gray sparked a diplomatic row when he appeared to claim in parliament that Montenegro had been involved in ethnic cleansing and war crimes during the 1990s Balkans Conflict.

On 7 April 2011, whilst campaigning at Glasgow Central station for the Scottish Parliament election, Gray was forced to cancel an event due to disruption by a group protesting against public spending cuts led by Sean Clerkin. He quickly left the station and ran into a nearby Subway outlet to escape the protesters, who followed him into the shop and continued to heckle him. Gray later stated that he had not been unsettled by the incident as "I spent two years working in the civil war in Mozambique, I've been to Rwanda two months after the genocide, I walked the killing fields in Cambodia and I was in Chile three days after Pinochet was demitted from office".

At the 2011 election, Labour suffered a net loss of seven seats, with many of their leading figures being defeated. Labour took a particularly severe beating in its Central Belt heartland, having to rely on regional lists in many cases. It was Labour's worst electoral performance in Scotland in eighty years. Gray himself was re-elected as MSP for East Lothian by the narrowest margin of his political career; with just 151 votes over the SNP candidate, making the Holyrood seat for the first time ever a Labour–SNP marginal. He announced on 6 May that he would stand down as party leader in the autumn.

== Later political career ==
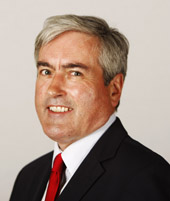
Official parliamentary portrait, 2011

Gray was reappointed to the post of Shadow Cabinet Secretary for Finance in the Scottish Labour Shadow Cabinet on 29 June 2013. Following the 2014 leadership election, he was made Shadow Cabinet Secretary for Education and Lifelong Learning.

On 13 June 2015, Gray was appointed Acting Leader of the Scottish Labour Party whilst a leadership and a deputy leadership election were simultaneously held, on account of deputy leader Kezia Dugdale resigning to run for the leadership. At the 2016 Scottish Parliament election, while several Labour MSPs lost their seats, Gray retained his seat with an increased majority compared to 2011.

Gray announced that he would be standing down at the 2021 Scottish Parliament election in June 2020, in order to spend more time with his family.

Gray nominated Anas Sarwar in the 2021 Scottish Labour leadership election.

== Personal life ==
Gray has been married twice. He is a lifelong fan of Edinburgh football club Hibernian, and enjoys reading, music and hill walking. He is a member of the Church of Scotland.

== Notes ==
Scottish Parliament
New parliament Scotland Act 1998	Member of the Scottish Parliament for Edinburgh Pentlands; 1999–2003	Succeeded by David McLetchie
Preceded by John Home Robertson	Member of the Scottish Parliament for East Lothian; 2007–present	Incumbent
Political offices
Preceded by Wendy Alexander	Minister for Enterprise, Transport and Lifelong Learning; 2002–2003	Succeeded by Jim Wallace
Preceded by Jackie Baillie	Minister for Social Justice; 2001–2002	Succeeded by Margaret Curran
Preceded by Angus MacKay	Deputy Minister for Justice; 2000–2001	Succeeded by Richard Simpson
New office Scotland Act 1998	Deputy Minister for Health and Community Care; 1999–2000	Succeeded by Malcolm Chisholm
Party political offices
Preceded by Wendy Alexander	Leader of the Scottish Labour Party; 2008–2011	Succeeded by Johann Lamont
Preceded by Jim Murphy	Leader of the Scottish Labour Party; Acting; 2015	Succeeded by Kezia Dugdale
