= Mary Fee =

Scottish Labour politician

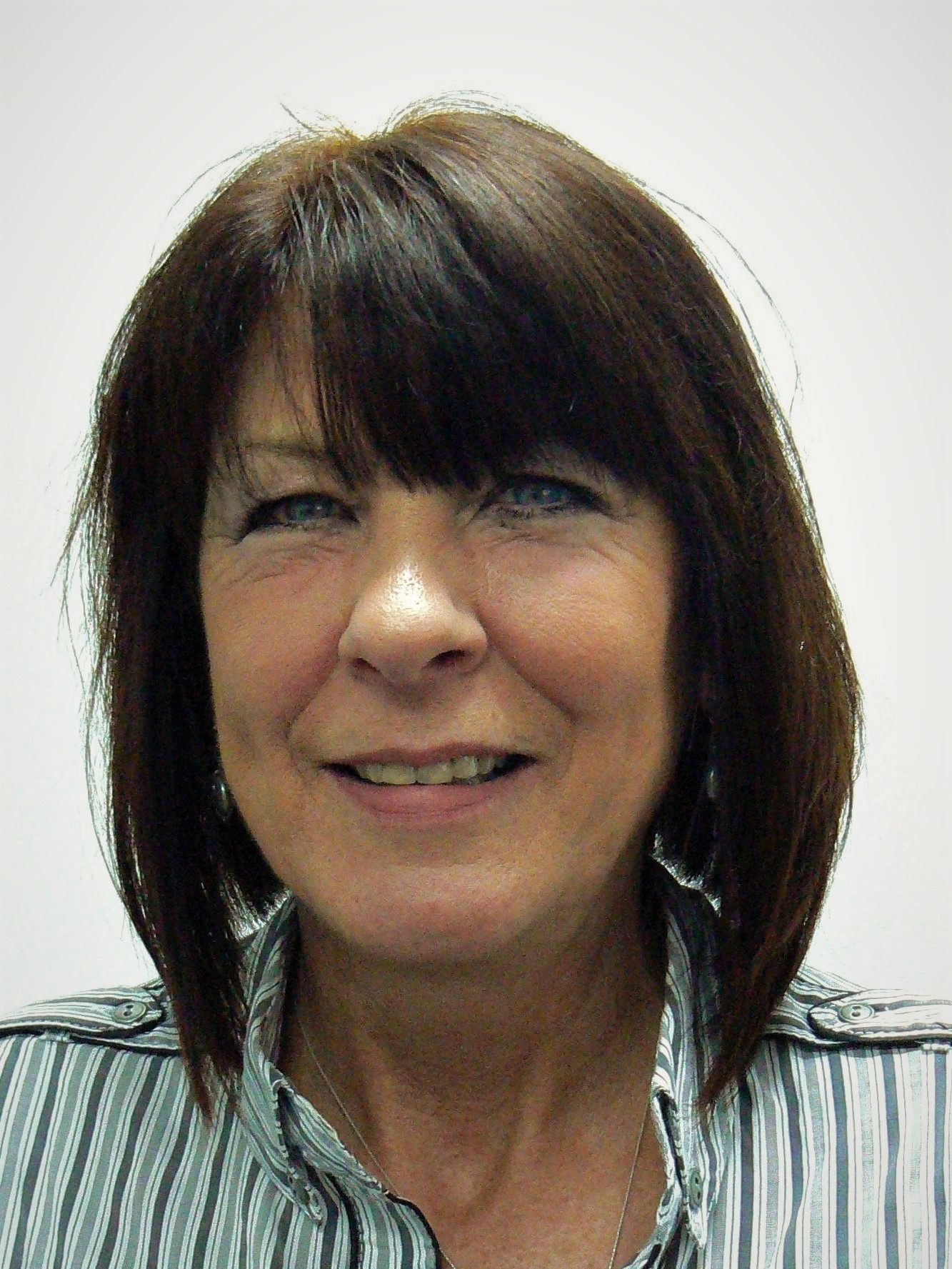
- Official portrait, 2011

Member of the Scottish Parliament for West Scotland (1 of 7 Regional MSPs)
- In office 5 May 2011 – 5 May 2021

Scottish Labour portfolios
- 2014–2015: Shadow Cabinet Secretary for Infrastructure, Investment and Cities
- 2015–2016: Shadow Cabinet Secretary for Reform
- 2016–2017: Shadow Minister for Equalities

Personal details
- Born: Mary Christina Fee; 23 March 1954 (age 71) Edinburgh, Scotland
- Party: Scottish Labour

Mary Christina Fee (born 23 March 1954) is a Scottish politician who was a Member of the Scottish Parliament (MSP) for the West Scotland region from 2011 to 2021. A member of the Scottish Labour Party, she was its deputy spokesperson for a number of portfolios from 2017 to 2019.

== Early life and career ==
Fee was born in Edinburgh on 23 March 1954. She was educated first at Leith Walk Primary and later at Broughton Secondary, both in Edinburgh.

After leaving education, she entered employment with the Bank of Scotland where she stayed for two years (1972–1974). She then left the company to work for British Telecom, where she remained for over ten years (1974–1984). Having married in 1977, Fee transferred within British Telecom to their Glasgow offices.

In 1990, Fee began working for Tesco in their Renfrew store. She became involved in the trade union, Usdaw, of which she is still a member, and became a shop steward in 1990. Mary was elected onto the Usdaw Executive in 2000 and later became a member of the STUC General Council. Fee served as a member of the Employment Tribunals during this time as resigned from the Tribunals as of February 2011.

== Political career ==
Fee was elected to Renfrewshire Council in the 2007 Scottish local elections, having been elected on first preference votes in the first round to the Renfrew South and Gallowhill Ward of Renfrewshire council.

For the 2011 Scottish Parliament election, Labour had placed Fee as the candidate at the top of their West Scotland list and she was elected on 5 May. She stepped down as a councillor for the Renfrew South and Gallowhill Ward at the 2012 Scottish Local elections. During the fourth Scottish Parliament, Fee had various spokesperson posts for Scottish Labour. Under the leadership of Johann Lamont, Fee was Scottish Labour's Shadow Housing Minister; then under Jim Murphy, Fee was promoted to the position of, Spokesperson for Infrastructure, Investment and Cities before later taking on the position of Spokesperson for Reform, after Kezia Dugdale was elected as the party's new leader in August 2015.

In September 2015, Fee's amendment to the Criminal Justice (Scotland) Bill was passed after receiving cross-party support. The amendment aimed to increase support to children with a parent in prison through the introduction of Child and Family Impact Assessments when an adult with dependent children is sent to prison.

Among Fee's other notable parliament work was the important role she played in campaigning for the passage of the Marriage and Civil Partnership (Scotland) Act 2014 which legalised same-sex marriage in Scotland.

At the 2016 Scottish Parliament election, Fee stood for the Renfrewshire North and West constituency where she was placed third, although she was again returned to the Scottish Parliament on Labour's West of Scotland list. During the fifth Parliament, Fee is a member of the Equal Opportunities Committee and the Justice Committee in the Scottish Parliament. She is also a substitute member of the Public Petitions Committee.

Fee established the Cross-Party Group on Families Affected by Imprisonment and was the Convener for this group.

Fee nominated Anas Sarwar in the 2021 Scottish Labour leadership election.

== Personal life ==
Fee lives in Renfrewshire with her husband, Brian, with whom she has two sons. She suffers from lupus.
