= Margaret McDougall =

Scottish Labour Party politician (born 1949)

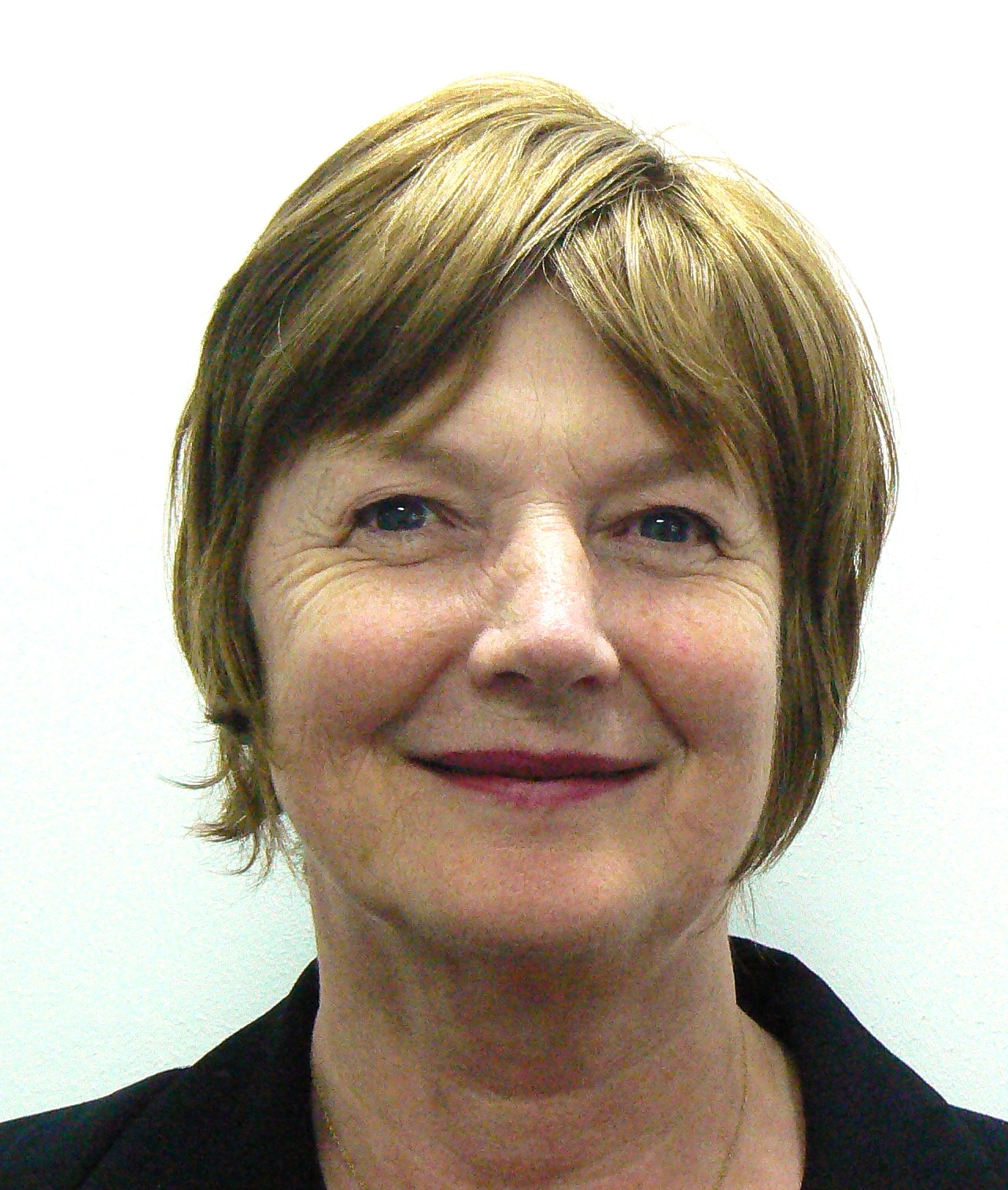

Member of the Scottish Parliament for the West Scotland region
- In office 5 May 2011 – 24 March 2016

Personal details
- Born: 23 January 1949 (age 77)
- Party: Labour

Margaret McDougall is a former Scottish Labour Party politician. She was a Member of the Scottish Parliament (MSP) for the West Scotland region from 2011 to 2016.

She previously represented the Kilwinning South ward on North Ayrshire Council and stood for election to the Scottish Parliament on the Labour list for the South of Scotland region in the 2007 election.

McDougall was elected to the Scottish Parliament in 2011 to represent the West of Scotland region, as the Labour Party returned three members from the list. She did not seek re-election in 2016.

McDougall was the victim of a robbery in Irvine, North Ayrshire in January 2014 in which she suffered broken fingers on both hands.
