= Graeme Pearson =

Scottish politician

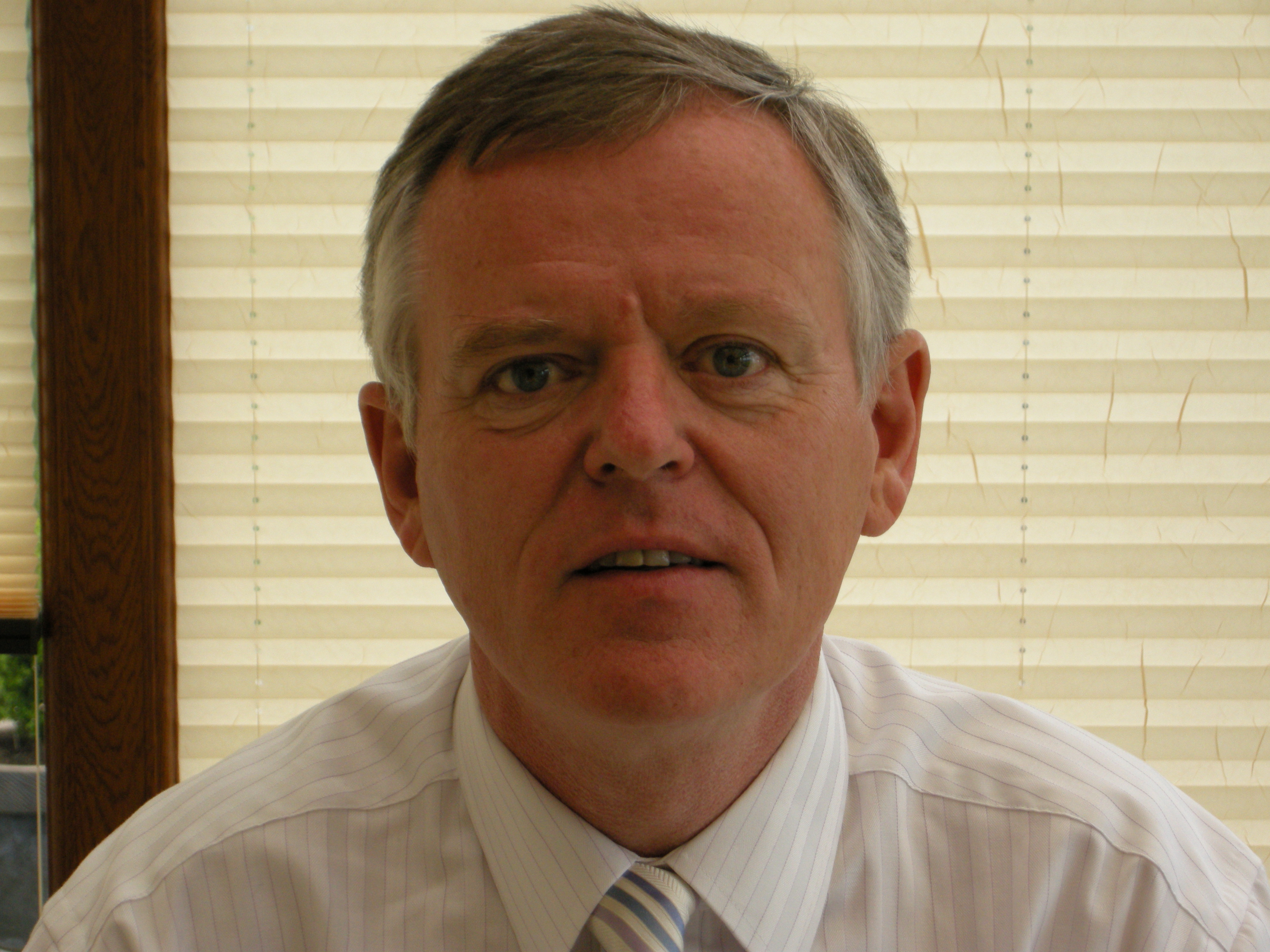
- Pearson in 2008

Scottish Labour Spokesperson for Justice
- In office 19 August 2015 – 5 May 2016
- Leader: Kezia Dugdale
- Preceded by: Hugh Henry
- Succeeded by: Claire Baker

Member of the Scottish Parliament for South Scotland (1 of 7 Regional MSPs)
- In office 5 May 2011 – 24 March 2016

Personal details
- Born: 1 April 1950 (age 76)
- Party: Scottish Labour
- Occupation: Member of the Scottish Parliament
- Profession: Police Officer, Politician

Graeme James Pearson (born 1 April 1950) is a former Scottish police officer and politician who served as a Member of the Scottish Parliament (MSP) for the South Scotland region from 2011 to 2016. A member of the Scottish Labour Party, he was Shadow Cabinet Secretary for Justice from 2015 to 2016.

He is a former police officer and Director General of the Scottish Crime and Drug Enforcement Agency. After being elected at the 2011 Scottish Parliament election, he was appointed to the position of Shadow Cabinet Secretary for Justice in the Scottish Labour frontbench team by Johann Lamont in June 2013.

On 12 June 2015, Pearson announced that he would not seek re-election at the 2016 Scottish Parliament election.

Pearson was appointed as the Chief Executive of Scotland in Union in January 2017, in succession to Alastair Cameron, founder of the pressure group. He was succeeded in the post at the organisation (now known as Scotland in the Union) the following August by the former Labour MP Pamela Nash.
