= Drew Smith (politician) =

Scottish Labour politician

Member of the Scottish Parliament for Glasgow (1 of 7 Regional MSPs)
- In office 6 May 2011 – 24 March 2016

Personal details
- Party: Scottish Labour
- Education: Aberdeen University, Glasgow University and The Open University
- Committees: Health and Sport Committee, previously Welfare Reform, Public Audit and Subordinate Legislation Committees
- Website: www.drewsmith.org.uk

Drew Smith is a Scottish Labour politician. He was Member of the Scottish Parliament (MSP) for the Glasgow region from 2011 to 2016, serving as Scottish Labour's frontbench spokesperson on social justice, the constitution and equalities and as Chair of the Trades Union Group of Labour MSPs.

== Political career ==
He was first elected in 2011 and is a former Chair of Scottish Young Labour (2005–06) and former member of the Scottish TUC General Council (2007–10).

Drew Smith was Chair of the Young Workers Committee of the Scottish TUC in 2008–2009, and was awarded the Jimmy Waugh Memorial Prize for Services to Young Workers in 2011. On three occasions when elected Drew Smith refused to cross picket lines to attend debates at Holyrood. On 20 March 2013 he spoke at a rally of public sector workers led by the Public and Commercial Services Union and the Scottish TUC in Glasgow's St Enoch Square instead of attending a parliamentary debate on the dispute and advocated a boycott of Labour MSPs from attending Parliament.

In 2013, Smith declared his support for a "soft opt-out" system of organ donation in Scotland, akin to that endorsed by Welsh Labour. He said such a scheme "will save lives" while ensuring that "the wishes of individuals are paramount".

He became Scottish Labour’s Shadow Cabinet Secretary for the Constitution in 2012 until the end of 2014. He announced his intention in 2015 to leave the Scottish Parliament at the 2016 Scottish General Election.

After retiring as an MSP, Smith worked for the GMB trade union. In December 2020, Scottish Labour announced that Smith would be appointed as an acting General Secretary of the party, to serve until the 2021 Scottish Parliament election.

== See also ==
- Scottish Labour Party
