= Claudia Beamish =

Scottish Labour Co-op politician

The Honourable Claudia Beamish
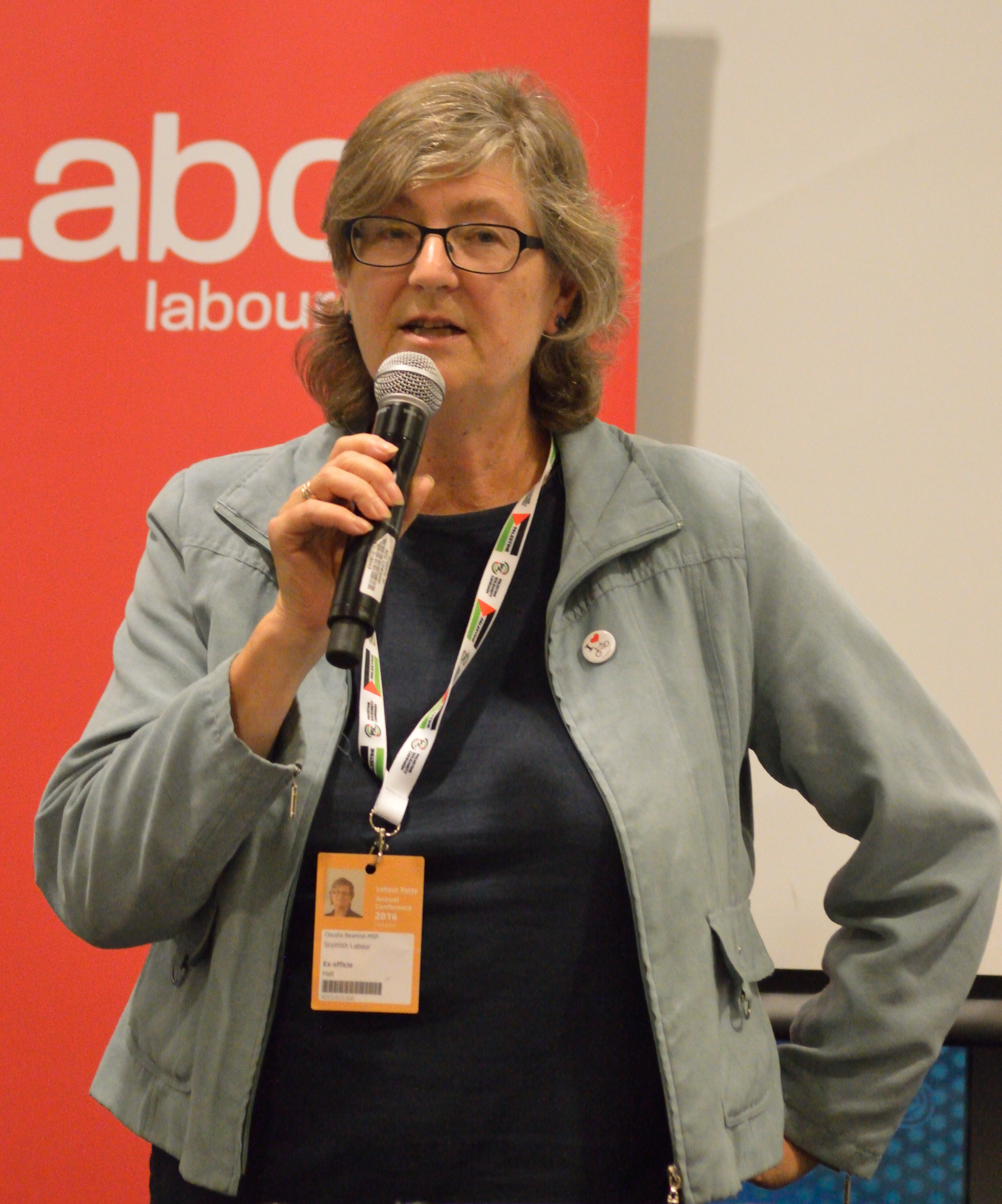
- Beamish in 2016

Member of the Scottish Parliament for South Scotland (1 of 7 Regional MSPs)
- In office 5 May 2011 – 5 May 2021

Scottish Labour portfolios
- 2016–2021: Shadow Cabinet Secretary for Environment, Climate Change and Land Reform

Personal details
- Born: Claudia Hamilton Beamish; 9 August 1952 (age 73) London, England
- Party: Scottish Labour Co-operative
- Domestic partner: Michael Derrington
- Parent: Tufton Beamish (father)
- Website: Official Website

Claudia Hamilton Beamish (born 9 August 1952) is a Scottish Labour Co-operative politician who served as Member of the Scottish Parliament (MSP) for the South Scotland region from 2011 to 2021.

== Early life ==
Claudia Hamilton Beamish is the daughter of the Conservative life peer Tufton Victor Hamilton Beamish, Baron Chelwood and his first wife Janet McMillan Stevenson. Prior to entering politics, she worked as a primary school teacher.

== Political career ==
Beamish was placed at the top of Labour's list for the South of Scotland in the 2003 and 2007 Scottish Parliament elections.

Beamish was the Labour Co-operative candidate for Dumfriesshire, Clydesdale and Tweeddale at the 2010 general election, finishing second with 13,263 votes (28.9%).

=== Member of the Scottish Parliament ===
Beamish was the Convener of the Equal Opportunities Committee in the Scottish Parliament in the second half of 2011. Following the election of Johann Lamont as Labour leader, Beamish was appointed as Labour's Shadow Minister for Environment and Climate Change. She served as a member of the Parliament's Rural Affairs, Climate Change and Environment (RACCE) Committee during its scrutiny of the Land Reform Bill 2015. She is a member of various Cross-Party Groups; Deputy Convenor of the Cross-Party Group on Dyslexia; Deputy Convenor of the Cross-Party Group on Men's Violence Against Women and Children; and Co-convenor of the Cross-Party Group on Carers.

At the 2016 Scottish Parliament election, Beamish ran in the Clydesdale constituency, finishing in third place with 6,995 votes (20.7%). Though not elected, she was returned on the regional list.

Beamish nominated Anas Sarwar in the 2021 Scottish Labour leadership election.

Beamish stood again in Clydesdale at the 2021 Scottish Parliament election, and was the fourth Labour candidate on the South Scotland list. She increased her previous share in the constituency, by 1.3% to 8,960 votes (22.0%), retaining third place. On the regional list, Labour elected three of their candidates, with Beamish being among the incumbent MSPs to lose their seat in that election.

== Personal life ==
Beamish's partner is actor Michael Derrington. They brought up their children in Pettinain, South Lanarkshire. While an MSP, she rented a flat in Shandon, Edinburgh which is owned by former Education minister Peter Peacock.
