= Jim Murphy =

Scottish politician (born 1967)

The Right Honourable Jim Murphy
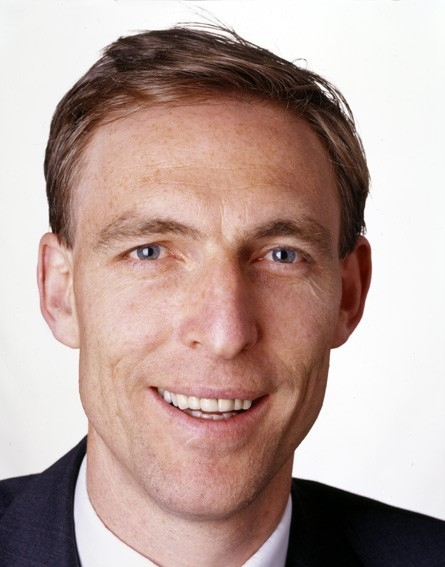
- Official portrait, c. 2008

Leader of the Scottish Labour Party
- In office 13 December 2014 – 13 June 2015
- Deputy: Kezia Dugdale
- UK party leader: Ed Miliband; Harriet Harman (Acting)
- Holyrood leader: Kezia Dugdale
- Preceded by: Johann Lamont (Note: Anas Sarwar acted from 24 October 2014 to 13 December 2014)
- Succeeded by: Kezia Dugdale (Note: Iain Gray acted from 13 June 2015 to 15 August 2015)

Secretary of State for Scotland
- In office 3 October 2008 – 11 May 2010
- Prime Minister: Gordon Brown
- Preceded by: Des Browne
- Succeeded by: Danny Alexander
Shadow cabinet posts
Shadow Secretary of State for International Development
In office 7 October 2013 – 2 November 2014
Leader	Ed Miliband
Preceded by	Ivan Lewis
Succeeded by	Mary Creagh
Shadow Secretary of State for Defence
In office 8 October 2010 – 7 October 2013
Leader	Ed Miliband
Preceded by	Bob Ainsworth
Succeeded by	Vernon Coaker
Shadow Secretary of State for Scotland
In office 11 May 2010 – 8 October 2010
Leader	Harriet Harman (Acting)
Preceded by	David Mundell
Succeeded by	Ann McKechin
Junior ministerial offices
Minister of State for Europe
In office 28 June 2007 – 3 October 2008
Prime Minister	Gordon Brown
Preceded by	Geoff Hoon
Succeeded by	Caroline Flint
Minister of State for Employment and Welfare Reform
In office 5 May 2006 – 28 June 2007
Prime Minister	Tony Blair
Preceded by	Jane Kennedy
Succeeded by	Caroline Flint
Minister for the Cabinet Office Chancellor of the Duchy of Lancaster
Acting; 2 November 2005 – 5 May 2006
Prime Minister	Tony Blair
Preceded by	John Hutton
Succeeded by	Hilary Armstrong
Parliamentary Secretary for the Cabinet Office
In office 10 May 2005 – 5 May 2006
Prime Minister	Tony Blair
Preceded by	Office established
Succeeded by	Pat McFadden
Lord Commissioner of the Treasury
In office 13 June 2003 – 10 May 2005
Prime Minister	Tony Blair
Preceded by	Ian Pearson
Succeeded by	Vernon Coaker
Further offices held
Member of Parliament for East Renfrewshire Eastwood (1997–2005)
In office 1 May 1997 – 30 March 2015
Preceded by	Allan Stewart
Succeeded by	Kirsten Oswald
46th President of the National Union of Students
In office 1994–1996
Preceded by	Lorna Fitzsimons
Succeeded by	Douglas Trainer

Personal details
- Born: James Francis Murphy; 23 August 1967 (age 59) Glasgow, Scotland
- Party: Labour
- Spouse: Claire Murphy
- Children: 3

James Francis Murphy (born 23 August 1967) is a Scottish former politician who served as Leader of the Scottish Labour Party from 2014 to 2015 and Secretary of State for Scotland from 2008 to 2010. He was Member of Parliament (MP) for East Renfrewshire, formerly Eastwood, from 1997 to 2015. He identifies as a social democrat and has expressed support for a foreign policy of Western interventionism. He has been described as being on the political right of the Labour Party.

Born in Glasgow, Murphy's family moved to South Africa in 1980. After returning to Scotland, he became involved in student politics and became Scotland's youngest MP at the age of 29. Murphy served in the New Labour governments of Tony Blair and Gordon Brown as Parliamentary Secretary for the Cabinet Office from 2005 to 2006, Minister of State for Employment and Welfare Reform from 2006 to 2007 and Minister of State for Europe from 2007 to 2008. From 2008 to 2010, Murphy served in the Cabinet as Secretary of State for Scotland. After Labour lost the 2010 general election, Murphy served in Ed Miliband's Shadow cabinet as Shadow Secretary of State for Defence and Shadow Secretary of State for International Development.

Following Johann Lamont's resignation, Murphy was elected Leader of the Scottish Labour Party in the 2014 leadership election. He led Scottish Labour into the 2015 general election, promising not to lose a single seat to the SNP (Scottish National Party). Labour went on to lose 40 of its 41 seats in a landslide victory for the SNP, who won 56 of the 59 seats in Scotland. After surviving a vote of no confidence, Murphy announced in May 2015 he would step down as leader that June. The subsequent leadership contest was won by his deputy leader Kezia Dugdale.

== Early life and career ==
Murphy was born in Glasgow and raised in a flat in Arden. He was educated at St Louise's Primary School, followed by Bellarmine Secondary School in Glasgow until 1980, when, after his father became unemployed, he and his family emigrated to Cape Town, South Africa. In Cape Town, he attended Milnerton High School.

In 1985, Murphy returned to Scotland aged 17 to avoid service in the South African Defence Force. He studied Politics and European Law at the University of Strathclyde in Glasgow but failed to graduate. During sabbaticals from his studies, he held the posts of President of both NUS Scotland and NUS. He dropped out of university to become the youngest Scottish MP at the age of 29.

During his time at university, Murphy was elected President of the Scottish National Union of Students, one of the "special region" organisations within the NUS, serving from 1992 until 1994. Murphy then took a further sabbatical from university in 1994 to serve as the President of the National Union of Students, an office which he held from 1994 to 1996, during which time he was a member of Labour Students. As NUS President, he also served, ex officio, as a Director of Endsleigh Insurance from 1994 to 1996.

In 1995, the NUS dropped its opposition to the abolition of the student grant. Murphy was condemned by a House of Commons early day motion, introduced by Ken Livingstone and signed by 13 other Labour MPs, for "intolerant and dictatorial behaviour" regarding Clive Lewis' suspension. He was elected for a second term as NUS President, serving until 1996. He then became special projects manager of the Scottish Labour Party.

== Early parliamentary career ==
Murphy was selected to stand as the Labour Party candidate in the seat of Eastwood at the 1997 general election. He was elected as MP for Eastwood on 1 May 1997, winning the formerly safe Conservative seat with a majority of 3,236 as Scotland's youngest MP.

From 1999 to 2001, Murphy was a member of the Public Accounts Select Committee, which oversees public expenditure. In February 2001, he was appointed as the Parliamentary Private Secretary (PPS) to Helen Liddell, the Secretary of State for Scotland, after the resignation of Frank Roy over the Carfin Grotto fiasco. Upon becoming a PPS, he stood down from his previous other roles as the Vice Chair of the Labour Party's Treasury, Northern Ireland and Culture, Media and Sport Committees.

At the 2001 general election he was re-elected as MP for Eastwood, with an increased majority of 9,141. In late 2001 he suggested bombing the poppy fields of Afghanistan to try to destroy the opium crop. In June 2002, he was appointed as a government whip, with responsibility for the Scotland Office and the Northern Ireland Office. His responsibilities were expanded in November 2002 to include the Department of Trade and Industry, and again in June 2003 to cover the Foreign and Commonwealth Office and the Department for International Development. He was the Chair of the Labour Friends of Israel from 2001 to 2002.

== In government ==
=== Junior government minister ===
For the 2005 general election, the Eastwood constituency was renamed East Renfrewshire, although the boundaries were unchanged. Murphy was re-elected with a majority of 6,657 and subsequently promoted to ministerial rank as the Parliamentary Secretary for the Cabinet Office. His responsibilities in that role included the promotion of e-government, better regulation and modernising public services, during this time he also served as acting Chancellor of the Duchy of Lancaster and Minister for the Cabinet Office. In January 2006, he was the government minister responsible for introducing the Legislative and Regulatory Reform Act 2006 in the House of Commons. The act was controversial because of a perception it was an enabling act substantially removing the ancient British constitutional restriction on the executive introducing and altering laws without assent or scrutiny by Parliament. The bill proved unpopular with MPs and the Green Party but received royal assent on 8 November 2006.

Murphy was promoted in May 2006 to become Minister of State for Employment and Welfare Reform. He oversaw the Welfare Reform Act 2007 and told a conference in Edinburgh the housing benefit changes and employment and support allowance would help single parents and older citizens back into work. The act was criticised over the involvement of private insurers in its drafting and as being part of a wider move towards workfare and a disability policy based around Work Capability Assessment. His reforms helped lay the foundations for the policies of subsequent Conservative governments, which saw thousands of people with health conditions and disabilities dying within six weeks of being declared fit for work.

Murphy was promoted to Minister of State for Europe in June 2007. He helped to ratify the Treaty of Lisbon, which was confirmed on 16 July 2007. The stated aim of the treaty was to "complete the process started by the Treaty of Amsterdam [1997] and by the Treaty of Nice [2001] with a view to enhancing the efficiency and democratic legitimacy of the Union and to improving the coherence of its action." He was commended for his commission of the "Engagement: Public Diplomacy in a Globalised World" collection of essays, organised with the Foreign and Commonwealth Office.

=== Secretary of State for Scotland ===
In October 2008, Prime Minister Gordon Brown appointed Murphy to the Cabinet as Secretary of State for Scotland, with additional responsibility for retaining Scottish seats at the next general election. He was also appointed to the Privy Council. In 2009, he apologised "on behalf of all politicians" for the expenses scandal. He was also the cabinet minister responsible for co-ordinating Pope Benedict's visit to the UK in 2010 – which was the first ever state visit by a Pope to the UK.

== Shadow Cabinet ==
=== Shadow Secretary of State for Defence ===
At the 2010 general election, the Labour Party held every seat they had won in Scotland in 2005, although they lost the election overall. Murphy was subsequently one of the two campaign managers for David Miliband's failed bid for the leadership of the Labour Party, along with Douglas Alexander. Following the election of Ed Miliband, Murphy was appointed Shadow Secretary of State for Defence on 8 October 2010. Also in 2010, The Herald awarded him with the title of "Best Scot at Westminster" for a second year in a row, having given him the title for the first time in 2009.

In 2011, The Daily Telegraph published leaked US diplomatic cables stating that throughout 2009, Murphy had a leading role in organising the support of opposition parties in promoting the implementation of the Commission on Scottish Devolution's recommendations. The aim was to "block an independence referendum" in Scotland.

As Shadow Defence Secretary, Murphy criticised moves to boycott Israel, stating that the Labour Party's policy was to avoid participation in boycotts. He praised the "vital" role of NATO during the military intervention in the 2011 Libyan crisis resolution, stating that Libya had been set "on a path to censure, democratic and peaceful future". He also criticised the scrapping of the Rolls-Royce Nimrod, stating it was "probably the most expensive technically capable aircraft in our history" and it had been treated "like second hand car sent to scrap" despite its usefulness in defence.

Murphy co-chaired the review of the Labour Party in Scotland with Sarah Boyack, commissioned by Ed Miliband in May 2011 in response to the landslide victory by the Scottish National Party in the 2011 Scottish Parliament election, which reported in August of that year.

On 3 July 2013, Murphy criticised the Unite trade union for "bullying" and "overstepping the mark" for allegedly interfering with the selection of a candidate in Falkirk. A Labour Party investigation later cleared Unite of any wrongdoing.

Murphy voted against the restriction of housing benefit for those in social housing deemed to have excess bedrooms, otherwise known as the "Bedroom Tax", in favour of allowing same sex marriage and against capping discretionary working age benefits, allowing them to rise in line with prices.

=== Shadow Secretary of State for International Development ===
In 2013, Murphy was moved to the post of Shadow Secretary of State for International Development in a "purge of Blairites" by Ed Miliband. His unease with the Labour leader's decision to oppose military action in Syria may have contributed to the move. He stated he had agreed to take a more prominent role in the Better Together campaign to keep Scotland in the UK. Murphy told a radio show in October 2013 that female soldiers should be able to serve in combat roles. In March 2014, Murphy criticised FIFA for the management of the 2022 World Cup in Qatar, citing the "sub-human working conditions" he saw when visiting the worker camps for the Qatar stadiums.

=== Expenses ===
A 2010 commission chaired by Thomas Legg demanded Murphy repay £577.46 in expenses which he had overclaimed. He did not appeal, and repaid the money in full. Expenses documents made available showed he also claimed over £1 million between 2001 and 2012. In 2007/8 he claimed £3,900 for food, £2,284 for petty cash and £4,884 for a new bathroom. He claimed £249 for a TV set and a further £99 for a TV stand; £1762.50 of taxpayers money paid for Murphy's website whilst further claims included Labour party adverts in the local press. He claimed almost £2000 of public cash to pay private accountants to handle his tax returns.

In 2012, Murphy was among a group of 27 MPs named as benefiting from up to £20,000 per year expenses to rent accommodation in London, at the same time as letting out property they owned in the city. Although the practice did not break rules, it has been characterised as a "loophole" that allows politicians to profit from Commons allowances. He also designated his constituency home in Glasgow as his second home for which he claimed £780 a month in mortgage interest payments in 2007/2008.

== Scottish independence referendum campaign ==
During the 2014 Scottish independence referendum, Murphy gained prominence in the media for his role in the "No" campaign, due to his "100 Streets in 100 Days" tour. He briefly suspended the tour on 28 August 2014, after an egg was thrown at him by a member of the public in Kirkcaldy. Video evidence showed members of the public wearing 'Yes' campaign insignias berating him as he spoke. He claimed this was the result of an orchestrated attack by mobs of protesters organised by the Yes Scotland campaign in a deliberate attempt to intimidate him. The man responsible was a local resident who was a supporter of Scottish independence, who alleged that Jim Murphy had not answered a question asked of him. Pleading guilty to assault, he apologised for 'bringing the Yes campaign into disrepute unintentionally'.

Murphy was awarded The Spectator's Campaigner of the Year prize for his role in the 'No' campaign during the independence debate.

== Leader of the Scottish Labour Party ==
=== Election to leadership and early activities ===
Following Johann Lamont's resignation as Leader of the Scottish Labour Party, Murphy announced that he would be a candidate in the election to replace her, alongside Neil Findlay MSP and Sarah Boyack MSP. He resigned from the Labour Party Shadow Cabinet in November 2014 to focus on his campaign. The Guardian's Kevin McKenna argued Murphy's tour during the 2014 referendum campaign "wasn't really about his new-found enthusiasm for the union... [but] was, instead, a three-month job interview for the post of leader of the Labour party in Scotland". In announcing his candidacy, Murphy stated he would end the electoral losing streak of Labour in Scotland, creating a revival similar to Tony Blair's return to power in 1997 in the UK. On 13 December 2014, Murphy was elected as Leader of the Scottish Labour Party, having secured 56% of the vote under the party's electoral college system.

In December 2014, Murphy stated he was in favour for alcohol ban at Scottish football matches to be overturned on a trial basis. Mhari McGowan, representing Assist, a domestic violence support organisation, called the proposal "absolutely crazy". Ruth Davidson of the Conservative Party had previously called for a review of the policy in 2013.

In February 2015, Murphy claimed that four times as many NHS operations were being cancelled in Scotland as in England. When it emerged that the claim was based on a misreading of the statistics, Murphy had to delete a YouTube video and a message on social media he had made capitalising on the false claim.

In March 2015, citing figures from The Guardian on the low rate of Scotland's poorest pupils going to university, Murphy confirmed that higher education tuition would remain free for Scottish students.

=== 2015 general election ===
Upon his election as party leader Murphy said he was determined under his leadership Labour would not lose any MPs to the SNP at the 2015 UK general election. On 27 February 2015, Murphy announced that he would again stand for the East Renfrewshire seat at the general election. In the run-up to the 2015 general election, Murphy predicted that a late swing would save Labour in spite of unfavourable polls. During his campaign, the SNP suspended two members of their party after it emerged that they had disrupted Murphy's speeches with fellow campaigner Eddie Izzard.

During Murphy's time as leader, he took part in a debate at Glasgow University with Nicola Sturgeon, Ruth Davidson and Willie Rennie. During the debate the panel were asked about their stance on drugs, mainly if drug laws should be devolved to the Scottish Parliament and what their individual experiences with drugs were. When the panel were questioned if they had ever tried cannabis, Jim Murphy stated that "in the housing scheme where I grew up, glue sniffing was the thing".

On 7 May 2015, the Scottish National Party won 56 of the 59 Scottish seats at Westminster and Scottish Labour lost 40 of the 41 seats it was defending. Murphy lost his own East Renfrewshire seat to the SNP's Kirsten Oswald, leading to calls for his resignation.

Murphy, his chief of staff John McTernan and strategy head Blair McDougall were criticised for their role in Labour's defeat. Criticism was made of Labour party resources in Scotland being assigned to favoured candidates such as Alexander and Curran. Murphy stated that the loss was due to "an absence of ideas" rather than a "lack of passion", and referenced Labour's additional defeats in England as another factor affecting the party's success. Following his defeat, he said he would remain Leader of Scottish Labour, despite calls for his resignation.

In spite of surviving a vote of no confidence by 17 votes to 14 at a party meeting in Glasgow, Murphy announced on 16 May 2015 that he intended to step down as Leader of the Scottish Labour Party in June. At the same press conference Murphy also stated that he wanted to have a successor as leader in place by the summer, and confirmed he would not be standing for a seat at the Scottish Parliament at the 2016 election. He added that Scottish Labour was the "least modernised part of the Labour movement", and commented that problem with the Labour Party lay not with the trade unionists, but with Len McCluskey, leader of Unite, whose behaviour he described as "destructive".

Murphy's resignation took effect on 1 June 2015. While Kezia Dugdale, as Deputy Leader of Scottish Labour, would normally have acted as leader until a permanent leader was elected, former Scottish Labour Leader Iain Gray became acting leader as Dugdale resigned the Deputy Leadership in order to run for the Leadership vacated by Murphy.

== Political positions and views ==
Murphy identifies as a social democrat and has expressed sympathy for democratic socialism but has been described as being on the political right of the Labour Party. He has frequently been referred to as a Blairite but has claimed the term is outdated.

Murphy is on the Political Council of the Henry Jackson Society, whose outlook has been described variously as neoliberal and as neoconservative. The Society is also known for its reports related to Islamic and far-right extremism. The Society is named after the American politician Henry M. Jackson. As Shadow Secretary of State for Defence, he gave a speech at an HJS event entitled 'A New Model for Intervention: How the UK Responds to Extremism in North and West Africa and Beyond’, arguing for the UK to remain engaged in defence policy beyond its borders, while learning lessons from past experiences.

In January 2015, the Scottish National Party (SNP) and Scottish Greens called on Murphy to resign from the Henry Jackson Society. In response the Henry Jackson Society reaffirmed its cross-partisan nature, saying "we believe ... the broadest possible coalition of politicians – of which Jim Murphy is just one of 15 Labour parliamentarians to do so through our political advisory council – should engage with such ideas [of foreign policy]."

== Post-parliament career ==
=== Arden Strategies ===
Following the disastrous results for Scottish Labour at the 2015 general election, Murphy established Arden Strategies, a political lobbying firm. Murphy and Arden Strategies have been described as "leading power players" in the current Labour government, organising business events and sponsoring fundraising dinners for nearly a tenth of successful Labour candidates in the run up to the 2024 general election.

Arden Strategies ran a six-month campaign in the run-up to the 2024 United States presidential election, named Freedom at Home and Abroad, to promote giving more military support to Ukraine, running adverts targeting senior U.S. Republicans and the Biden administration. This included likening vice-presidential candidate JD Vance to a "Russian doll". Almost $1 million was transferred to a newly created U.S. non-profit organisation from foreign individuals to fund the campaign.

In 2024, BBC News reported that Murphy's firm, Arden Strategies, was lobbying the new Labour government on behalf of arms manufacturers and large energy companies. Arden Strategies was not a member of the Public Relations and Communications Association which requires more detailed disclosure of lobbying activities of members. In April 2025, Murphy ceased to be Arden Strategies' chief executive and became executive chair. By 2025, Arden Strategies had 35 employees and as of October 2024 reported assets and bank holdings of £7.5 million, almost entirely made since Starmer became Labour leader in 2020.

In 2026 Murphy was forced to apologise for 'clumsy language' after Arden asked companies for £30,000 to sponsor an event, including a 'photo opportunity' with a minister and access to a 'VIP dinner with top advisers' to Keir Starmer and Rachel Reeves. Promo materials for their 'Future of Tech Summit' claimed attendees would also be able to watch a "fireside chat" with Science Secretary Liz Kendall.

In 2026, Murphy took part in a TV series called The Wargame, hosted by Cathy Newman, in which members of the cast "reflect on the pressures of decision-making at the highest level and explore the wider questions raised from this thrilling documentary series".

=== Other activities ===
In 2015, Murphy became an advisor to the Finnish non-profit Crisis Management Initiative (CMI), advising on "conflict resolution in central Asia".

In November 2016, Murphy took up an employed position as an adviser to former UK Prime Minister Tony Blair.

In August 2018, Murphy paid for a full-page advert in the Jewish Telegraph in which he criticised Jeremy Corbyn for what he claimed was the party's failure to root out antisemitism. The article, which appeared on page three of the paper under the headline "In sorrow and anger - an apology", accused Corbyn and his top team of being "intellectually arrogant, emotionally inept and politically maladroit".

== Personal life ==
Murphy is married with three children – Cara, Matthew and Daniel. He captained the Parliamentary Football Team. He is a practising Catholic. He is also a vegetarian and a teetotaller. He is the author of The Ten Football Matches That Changed The World...And The One That Didn't.

Murphy was passing near to the Clutha Pub in Stockwell Street in Glasgow on the night of 29 November 2013, shortly after a Police Scotland helicopter crashed onto the roof of the pub, killing 10 people and injuring 31 others. He was later interviewed about the aftermath of the accident.

== Sources ==
- "Jim Murphy MP". Guardian Unlimited Politics. London. Archived from the original on 17 May 2001.
- "Jim Murphy MP career". Guardian Unlimited Politics. London. Archived from the original on 7 September 2006.
- "Jim Murphy Profile". BBC News. Archived from the original on 11 November 2006.
- "Jim Murphy Interview". Public Finance. Archived from the original on 21 August 2006.
- "Rt Hon Jim Murphy". Parliament UK.

Non-profit organisation positions
Preceded by Derek Munn	President of the Scottish National Union of Students; 1992–1994	Succeeded by Douglas Trainer
Preceded by Lorna Fitzsimons	President of the National Union of Students; 1994–1996	Succeeded by Douglas Trainer
Parliament of the United Kingdom
Preceded by Allan Stewart	Member of Parliament for Eastwood; 1997–2005	Constituency abolished
New constituency	Member of Parliament for East Renfrewshire; 2005–2015	Succeeded by Kirsten Oswald
Political offices
Preceded by John Hutton	Minister for the Cabinet Office; Acting; 2005–2006	Succeeded by Hilary Armstrong
Preceded by John Hutton	Chancellor of the Duchy of Lancaster; Acting; 2005–2006	Succeeded by Hilary Armstrong
Preceded by Geoff Hoon	Minister of State for Europe; 2007–2008	Succeeded by Caroline Flint
Preceded by Des Browne	Secretary of State for Scotland; 2008–2010	Succeeded by Danny Alexander
Preceded by David Mundell	Shadow Secretary of State for Scotland; 2010	Succeeded by Ann McKechin
Preceded by Bob Ainsworth	Shadow Secretary of State for Defence; 2010–2013	Succeeded by Vernon Coaker
Preceded by Ivan Lewis	Shadow Secretary of State for International Development; 2013–2014	Succeeded by Mary Creagh
Party political offices
Preceded by Johann Lamont	Leader of the Scottish Labour Party; 2014–2015	Succeeded by Kezia Dugdale
