= Opposition parties in the Scottish Parliament =

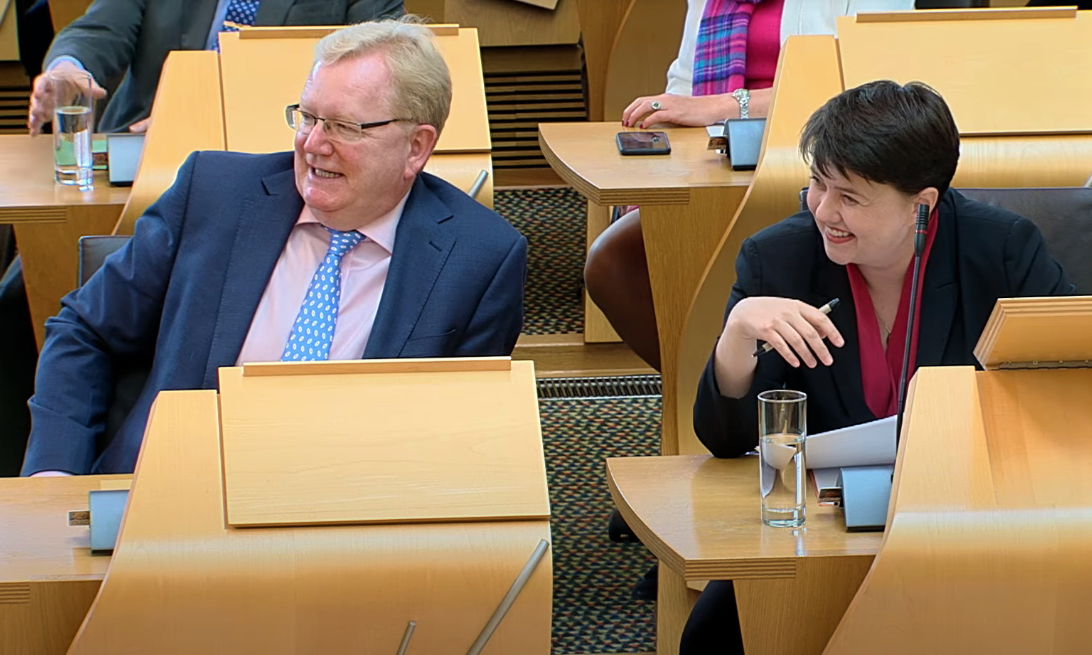
Jackson Carlaw (left) and Ruth Davidson (right) on the Scottish Conservative frontbench in 2018

Unlike in the Parliament of the United Kingdom, where there is a recognised "Official Opposition" to the government of the day, all parties in the Scottish Parliament that are not in government are technically on the same footing as "opposition parties". With the Scottish National Party (SNP) currently in government, the Scottish Conservatives, Scottish Labour, Reform UK Scotland, Scottish Liberal Democrats and the Scottish Greens each form shadow cabinets composed of Members of the Scottish Parliament (MSPs) and prospective parliamentary candidates.

Shadow cabinet ministers have a responsibility to shadow an individual government minister or a specific area of government. Other parties have frontbench teams with spokespersons covering multiple areas of government or which are composed of spokespersons from both within and outside the Scottish Parliament.

== Current Labour shadow cabinet ==
Marra Shadow Cabinet
| Minister Constituency | Portfolio | Shadows | Term |
Shadow Cabinet Secretaries
| Michael Marra; MSP for North East Scotland | Leader | John Swinney | 2026–present |
| Jackie Baillie; MSP for Dumbarton | Deputy Leader | Jenny Gilruth | 2021–present |
| Jackie Baillie; MSP for Dumbarton | Health and Care | Angela Constance | 2021–present |
| Daniel Johnson; MSP for Edinburgh Southern | Economy | Stephen Flynn | 2026–present |
| Joe Fagan; MSP for South Scotland | Finance | Jenny Gilruth | 2026–present |
| Neil Bibby; MSP for West Scotland | Constitution, Europe and External Affairs | Stephen Gethins | 2026–present |
| Katherine Sangster; MSP for Edinburgh and Lothians East | Education, Culture and Gaelic | Màiri McAllan | 2026–present |
| Pauline McNeill; MSP for Glasgow | Justice | Neil Gray | 2021–present |
| Mark Griffin; MSP for Central Scotland | Social Justice and Housing | Shirley-Anne Somerville | 2026–present |
| Paul Sweeney; MSP for Glasgow | Energy, Climate Action and Transport | Stephen Gethins, Gillian Martin and Stephen Flynn | 2026–present |

| Minister Constituency | Portfolio | Shadows | Term |
Junior Spokespersons
| Claire Baker; MSP for Mid Scotland and Fife | Parliamentary Business | Jamie Hepburn | 2026–present |
| Claire Baker; MSP for Mid Scotland and Fife | Equalities and International Development | Simita Kumar | 2026–present |
| Joe Long; MSP for Mid Scotland and Fife | Community Care and Mental Wellbeing | Alison Thewliss and Maree Todd | 2026–present |
| Carol Mochan; MSP for South Scotland | Public Service Reform and Local Government | Ivan McKee and Jenny Gilruth | 2026–present |
| Donald MacKinnon; MSP for Na h-Eileanan an Iar | Rural Affairs, Agriculture, Marine and the Islands | Gillian Martin and Jim Fairlie | 2026–present |
| Jenny Young; MSP for Central Scotland and Lothians West | Innovation, Technology, Skills and Tertiary Education | Alyn Smith | 2026–present |
| Irshad Ahmed; MSP for Edinburgh and Lothians East | Public Health and Sport | Maree Todd | 2026–present |

== Current Reform UK shadow cabinet ==
Offord Shadow Cabinet
| Minister Constituency | Portfolio | Shadows | Term |
Shadow Cabinet Secretaries
| Malcolm Offord; MSP for West Scotland | Leader | John Swinney | 2026–present |
| Thomas Kerr; MSP for Glasgow | Deputy Leader | Jenny Gilruth | 2026–present |
| Thomas Kerr; MSP for Glasgow | Housing, Community Cohesion, Public Safety and Drugs | Shirley-Anne Somerville and Maree Todd | 2026–present |
| Max Bannerman; MSP for Highlands and Islands | Parliamentary Business | Jamie Hepburn | 2026–present |
| Max Bannerman; MSP for Highlands and Islands | Public Service Reform | Ivan McKee | 2026–present |
| Angela Ross; MSP for Edinburgh and Lothians East | Finance and Economy | Jenny Gilruth and Stephen Flynn | 2026–present |
| Amanda Lindsay; MSP for Central Scotland and Lothians West | Education, Women and Girls | Màiri McAllan and Simita Kumar | 2026–present |
| Helen McDade; MSP for Mid Scotland and Fife | Health | Angela Constance | 2026–present |
| Kim Schmulian; MSP for Glasgow | Lord Advocate (Criminal Justice and Victims) | Ruth Charteris and Neil Gray | 2026–present |
| Jamie Langan; MSP for South Scotland | Rural Affairs | Gillian Martin | 2026–present |

Offord Shadow Junior Ministers
| Minister Constituency | Portfolio | Shadows | Term |
Shadow Ministers
| Julie MacDougall | Local Government | Hannah Mary Goodlad | 2026–present |
| David Smith | Veterans and Social Mobility | Jamie Hepburn | 2026–present |
| David Smith | Neurodiversity, Mental and Public Health | Maree Todd | 2026–present |
| Vic Currie | Constitution, Culture and External Affairs | Màiri McAllan and Stephen Gethins | 2026–present |
| Duncan Massey | Energy | Stephen Gethins | 2026–present |
| Mark Simpson | Business and Work | Tom Arthur | 2026–present |
| Graham Simpson | Transport and Tourism | Stephen Flynn | 2026–present |
| Senga Beresford | Children, Young People and Tertiary Education | Siobhian Brown and Alyn Smith | 2026–present |
| David Kirkwood | Innovation and Technology | Ben Macpherson | 2026–present |

== Current Green Shadow Cabinet ==
Second MacKay-Greer Shadow Cabinet
| Minister Constituency | Portfolio | Shadows | Term |
Shadow Cabinet Secretaries
| Gillian Mackay | Co-Leader (First Minister candidate) | John Swinney | 2025–present |
| Gillian Mackay | Constitution, External Affairs, Public Health and Sport | Stephen Gethins Maree Todd | 2026–present |
| Ross Greer | Co-Leader | John Swinney | 2025–present |
| Ross Greer | Finance | Jenny Gilruth | 2021–present |
| Lorna Slater | Public Service Reform | Ivan McKee | 2026–present |
| Lorna Slater | Group Business Manager | Jamie Hepburn | 2026–present |
| Kayleigh Kinross-O'Neill | Health | Angela Constance | 2026–present |
| Laura Moodie | Education | Màiri McAllan | 2026–present |
| Holly Bruce | Social Justice | Shirley-Anne Somerville | 2026–present |
| Mark Ruskell | Climate Action and Nature | Gillian Martin | 2026–present |
| Maggie Chapman | Justice | Neil Gray | 2021–present |
| Patrick Harvie | Economy, Transport and Tourism | Stephen Flynn | 2026–present |

Green Junior Spokespersons
| Ariane Burgess | Rural Affairs, Land Reform and the Marine Environment | 2021–present |
| Kristopher Leask | Energy, Local Government and the Islands | 2026–present |
| Cara McKee | Community Care | 2026–present |
| Q Manivannan | Culture | 2026–present |
| Iris Duane | Tertiary Education and Housing | 2026–present |
| Kate Nevens | Equalities and International Development | 2026–present |

== Current Conservative shadow cabinet ==
Second Findlay Shadow Cabinet
| Shadow Minister Constituency | Portfolio | Term |
Shadow Cabinet Secretaries
| Russell Findlay MSP for West Scotland | Leader of the Scottish Conservatives | 2024–present |
| Rachael Hamilton MSP for Ettrick, Roxburgh and Berwickshire | Deputy Leader Business and Tourism | 2024–present 2026–present |
| Craig Hoy MSP for Dumfriesshire | Finance and Social Security | 2024–present |
| Miles Briggs MSP for Edinburgh and Lothians East | Health and Care | 2026–present |
| Murdo Fraser MSP for Mid Scotland and Fife | Public Service Reform and Culture | 2026–present |
| Liam Kerr MSP for North East Scotland | Energy | 2026–present |
| Meghan Gallacher MSP for Central Scotland | Education and Equalities | 2026–present |
| Tim Eagle MSP for Highlands and Islands | Housing and Transport | 2026–present |
| Stephen Kerr MSP for Mid Scotland and Fife | Justice | 2026–present |
| Finlay Carson MSP for Galloway and West Dumfries | Rural Affairs and Environment | 2026–present |
| Alexander Burnett MSP for Aberdeenshire West | Local Government | 2026–present |

== Liberal Democrat spokespersons ==
Cole-Hamilton Spokespersons
| Photo | Portfolio | Officeholder | Term |
|---|---|---|---|
| | Leader | Alex Cole-Hamilton | 2021–present |
| | Deputy Leader | Wendy Chamberlain (Note: Member of Parliament) | 2021–present |
| | Rural Affairs Spokesperson | Andrew Baxter | 2026–present |
| | Justice Spokesperson | Yi-Pei Chou Turvey | 2026–present |
| | Climate, Environment and Energy Spokesperson | Sanne Dijkstra-Downie | 2026–present |
| | Education, Children and Young People | Duncan Dunlop | 2026–present |
| | Public Service Reform, Europe, External Affairs and Culture Spokesperson | David Green | 2026–present |
| | Health and Care Spokesperson | Adam Harley | 2026–present |
| | Housing, Social Security and Local Government Spokesperson | Morven May-MacCalum | 2026–present |
| | Economy, Finance and Tourism Spokesperson | Liam McArthur | 2026–present |
| | Chief Whip and Transport Spokesperson | Willie Rennie | 2026–present |

== Previous Conservative shadow cabinets ==
Second Davidson Shadow Cabinet (Note: Formed after the Scottish Conservatives came second at the 2016 Scottish Parliament election)
| Portfolio | Officeholder | Term |
|---|---|---|
| Leader | Ruth Davidson | 2016–2020 |
| Deputy Leader | Jackson Carlaw | 2016–2020 |
| Europe and External Affairs | Jackson Carlaw | 2016–2020 |
| Culture and Tourism | Jackson Carlaw | 2016–2017 |
| Culture and Tourism | Rachael Hamilton | 2017–2020 |
| Finance | Murdo Fraser | 2016–2020 |
| Economy, Jobs and Fair Work | Dean Lockhart | 2016–2020 |
| Health and Sport | Donald Cameron | 2016–2017 |
| Health and Sport | Miles Briggs | 2017–2020 |
| Education and Skills | Liz Smith | 2016–2020 |
| Constitution | Adam Tomkins | 2016–2020 |
| Social Security | Adam Tomkins | 2016–2018 |
| Social Security | Michelle Ballantyne | 2018–2020 |
| Justice | Douglas Ross | 2016–2017 |
| Justice | Liam Kerr | 2017–2020 |
| Rural Economy and Connectivity | Peter Chapman | 2016–2020 |
| Environment, Climate Change and Land Reform | Maurice Golden | 2016–2017 |
| Environment, Climate Change and Land Reform | Donald Cameron | 2017–2020 |
| Chief Whip | John Lamont | 2016–2017 |
| Chief Whip | Maurice Golden | 2017–2020 |

Carlaw Shadow Cabinet
| Portfolio | Officeholder | Term |
|---|---|---|
| Leader | Jackson Carlaw | February–August 2020 |
| Deputy Leader | Liam Kerr | February–August 2020 |
| Justice | Liam Kerr | February–August 2020 |
| Deputy Leader | Annie Wells | February–August 2020 |
| Climate Change, Environment and Land Reform | Annie Wells | February–August 2020 |
| Finance | Donald Cameron | February–August 2020 |
| Constitution and External Affairs | Murdo Fraser | February–August 2020 |
| Strategy | Adam Tomkins | February–August 2020 |
| Health | Miles Briggs | February–August 2020 |
| Education | Jamie Greene | February–August 2020 |
| Parliamentary Business Manager | Maurice Golden | February–August 2020 |
| Climate Change, Environment and Land Reform | Maurice Golden | February–August 2020 |
| Economy, Fair Work and Culture | Maurice Golden | February–August 2020 |
| Business, Infrastructure and Transport | Dean Lockhart | February–August 2020 |
| Rural Economy and Tourism | Rachael Hamilton | February–August 2020 |
| Housing, Communities and Social Security | Graham Simpson | February–August 2020 |
| Chief Whip | Liz Smith | February–August 2020 |

Ross–Davidson Shadow Cabinet
| Portfolio | Officeholder | Term |
|---|---|---|
| Leader | Douglas Ross | 2020–present |
| Leader in the Scottish Parliament | Ruth Davidson | 2020–2021 |
| Education and Skills | Jamie Greene | 2020–present |
| Justice | Liam Kerr | 2020–present |
| Health and Sport | Donald Cameron | 2020–present |
| Finance | Murdo Fraser | 2020–present |
| Environment, Climate Change and Land Reform | Liz Smith | 2020–present |
| Rural Economy and Tourism | Jamie Halcro Johnston | 2020–present |
| Constitution, Europe and External Affairs | Dean Lockhart | 2020–present |
| Communities and Local Government | Annie Wells | 2020–present |
| Economy, Fair Work and Culture | Maurice Golden | 2020–present |
| Transport, Infrastructure and Connectivity | Graham Simpson | 2020–present |
| Social Security and Older People | Rachael Hamilton | 2020–present |
| Chief Whip | Miles Briggs | 2020–present |

== Previous Labour shadow cabinets ==
=== Previous shadow cabinets ===
McConnell Shadow Cabinet
| Portfolio | Officeholder | Term |
|---|---|---|
| Leader | Jack McConnell | May–August 2007 |
| Deputy Leader and Parliamentary Business | Cathy Jamieson | May–August 2007 |
| Finance and Sustainable Growth | Wendy Alexander | May–August 2007 |
| Education and Lifelong Learning | Hugh Henry | May–August 2007 |
| Health and Wellbeing | Andy Kerr | May–August 2007 |
| Justice | Margaret Curran | May–August 2007 |
| Rural Affairs and Environment | Rhona Brankin | May–August 2007 |
Junior Opposition posts
| Europe, External Affairs and Culture | Patricia Ferguson | May–August 2007 |
| Enterprise, Energy and Tourism | Iain Gray | May–August 2007 |
| Transport, Infrastructure and Climate Change | Des McNulty | May–August 2007 |
| Schools and Skills | Ken Macintosh | May–August 2007 |
| Children and Early Years | Pauline McNeill | May–August 2007 |
| Public Health | Lewis Macdonald | May–August 2007 |
| Communities and Sport | Johann Lamont | May–August 2007 |
| Community Safety | Paul Martin | May–August 2007 |
| Environment | Sarah Boyack | May–August 2007 |
| Deputy Parliamentary Business | Michael McMahon | May–August 2007 |
| Parliamentary Private Secretary to Jack McConnell | Richard Baker | May–August 2007 |

Alexander Shadow Cabinet
| Portfolio | Officeholder | Term |
|---|---|---|
| Leader | Wendy Alexander | 2007–2008 |
| Deputy Leader | Cathy Jamieson | 2007–2008 |
| Parliamentary Business | Cathy Jamieson | 2007–2008 |
| Finance and Sustainable Growth | Iain Gray | 2007–2008 |
| Health and Wellbeing | Margaret Curran | 2007–2008 |
| Public Services and Local Government | Andy Kerr | 2007–2008 |
| Justice | Pauline McNeil | 2007–2008 |
| Education and Lifelong Learning | Rhona Brankin | 2007–2008 |
| Rural Affairs and Environment | Sarah Boyack | 2007–2008 |
Junior Opposition posts
| Europe and Culture | Patricia Ferguson | 2007–2008 |
| Transport, Infrastructure and Climate Change | Des McNulty | 2007–2008 |
| Schools and Skills | Ken Macintosh | 2007–2008 |
| Public Health | Lewis Macdonald | 2007–2008 |
| Communities and Sport | Johann Lamont | 2007–2008 |
| Community Safety | Paul Martin | 2007–2008 |

Gray Shadow Cabinet
| Portfolio | Officeholder | Term |
|---|---|---|
| Leader | Iain Gray | 2008–2011 |
| Deputy Leader | Johann Lamont | 2008–2011 |
| Parliamentary Business Manager | Michael McMahon | 2008–2011 |
| Chief Whip | David Stewart | 2008–2011 |
| Europe, External Affairs and Culture | Pauline McNeill | 2008–2011 |
| Finance and Sustainable Growth | Andy Kerr | 2008–2011 |
| Economy and Skills | John Park | 2008–2009 |
| Education and Lifelong Learning | Rhona Brankin | 2008–2009 |
| Education and Lifelong Learning | Des McNulty | 2009–2011 |
| Health and Wellbeing | Cathy Jamieson | 2008–2009 |
| Health and Wellbeing | Jackie Baillie | 2009–2011 |
| Justice | Richard Baker | 2008–2011 |
| Rural Affairs and Environment | Sarah Boyack | 2008–2011 |
| Minister without Portfolio | Margaret Curran | 2008–2010 |
| Minister without Portfolio | John Park | 2010–2011 |
| Local Government | Michael McMahon | 2009–2011 |

Lamont Shadow Cabinet
| Portfolio | Officeholder | Term |
|---|---|---|
| Leader | Johann Lamont | 2011–2014 |
| Deputy Leader | Anas Sarwar | 2011–2014 |
| Finance, Employment and Sustainable Growth | Ken Macintosh | 2011–2013 |
| Finance, Employment and Sustainable Growth | Iain Gray | 2013–2014 |
| Education and Lifelong Learning | Hugh Henry | 2011–2013 |
| Education and Lifelong Learning | Kezia Dugdale | 2013–2014 |
| Health and Wellbeing | Jackie Baillie | 2011–2013 |
| Health and Wellbeing | Neil Findlay | 2013–2014 |
| Culture, External Affairs and the Commonwealth Games | Patricia Ferguson | 2011–2014 |
| Justice | Graeme Pearson | 2011–2013 |
| Justice | Lewis Macdonald | 2013–2014 |
| Infrastructure and Capital Investment | Richard Baker | 2011–2013 |
| Infrastructure and Capital Investment | James Kelly | 2013–2014 |
| Local Government and Planning | Sarah Boyack | 2011–2014 |
| Rural Affairs and Environment | Claire Baker | 2011–2014 |
| Constitution | Drew Smith | 2013–2014 |
| Social Justice, Equalities and Welfare | Jackie Baillie | 2013–2014 |
| Parliamentary Business Manager | Paul Martin | 2011–2014 |
| Chief Whip | James Kelly | 2011–2013 |
| Chief Whip | Lewis Macdonald | 2013–2014 |
Also attending shadow cabinet meetings
| Portfolio | Officeholder | Term |
| Youth Employment | Kezia Dugdale | 2011–2013 |
| Youth Employment | Jenny Marra | 2013–2014 |
| Deputy Finance | Jenny Marra | 2013–2014 |
| Parliamentary Private Secretary to Johann Lamont | Siobhan McMahon | 2011–2014 |

Murphy Shadow Cabinet
| Portfolio | Officeholder | Term |
|---|---|---|
| Leader | Jim Murphy | 2014–2015 |
| Deputy Leader | Kezia Dugdale | 2014–2015 |
| Finance, Constitution and Economy | Jackie Baillie | 2014–2015 |
| Infrastructure, Investment and Cities | Mary Fee | 2014–2015 |
| Fair Work, Skills and Training | Neil Findlay | 2014–2015 |
| Education and Lifelong Learning | Iain Gray | 2014–2015 |
| Health, Wellbeing and Sport | Jenny Marra | 2014–2015 |
| Social Justice, Communities and Pensioners' Rights | Ken Macintosh | 2014–2015 |
| Justice | Hugh Henry | 2014–2015 |
| Rural Affairs, Food and Environment | Sarah Boyack | 2014–2015 |
| Culture, Europe and External Affairs | Claire Baker | 2014–2015 |
| Enterprise | Graeme Pearson | 2014–2015 |
| Chief Whip | Neil Bibby | 2014–2015 |
| Parliamentary Business Manager | James Kelly | 2014–2015 |

First Dugdale Shadow Cabinet
| Portfolio | Officeholder | Term |
|---|---|---|
| Leader | Kezia Dugdale | 2015–2016 |
| Deputy Leader | Alex Rowley | 2015–2016 |
| Equality | Jenny Marra | 2015–2016 |
| Opportunity | Iain Gray | 2015–2016 |
| Justice | Graeme Pearson | 2015–2016 |
| Public Services and Wealth Creation | Jackie Baillie | 2015–2016 |
| Community | Ken Macintosh | 2015–2016 |
| Environmental Justice | Sarah Boyack | 2015–2016 |
| Democracy | Claire Baker | 2015–2016 |
| Reform | Mary Fee | 2015–2016 |
| Parliamentary Business Manager | James Kelly | 2015–2016 |
| Chief Whip | Neil Bibby | 2015–2016 |

Second Dugdale Shadow Cabinet (Note: Formed after Scottish Labour came third at the 2016 Scottish Parliament election)
| Portfolio | Officeholder | Term |
|---|---|---|
| Leader | Kezia Dugdale | 2016–2017 |
| Deputy Leader | Alex Rowley | 2016–2017 |
| Economy, Jobs and Fair Work | Jackie Baillie | 2016–2017 |
| Finance | Kezia Dugdale | 2016–2017 |
| Community, Social Security and Equalities | Alex Rowley | 2016–2017 |
| Education, Skills and Science | Iain Gray | 2016–2017 |
| Justice | Claire Baker | 2016–2017 |
| Health and Sport | Anas Sarwar | 2016–2017 |
| Culture, Sport, Tourism and External Affairs | Lewis Macdonald | 2016–2017 |
| Environment, Climate Change and Land Reform | Claudia Beamish | 2016–2017 |
| Rural Economy and Connectivity | Rhoda Grant | 2016–2017 |
| Parliamentary Business Manager | James Kelly | 2016–2017 |

Leonard Shadow Cabinet
| Portfolio | Officeholder | Term |
|---|---|---|
| Leader | Richard Leonard | 2017–2021 |
| Deputy Leader | Lesley Laird | 2017–2019 |
| Deputy Leader | Jackie Baillie | 2020–2021 |
| Economy, Jobs and Fair Work | Jackie Baillie | 2017–2018 |
| Economy, Jobs and Fair Work | Richard Leonard | 2018–2021 |
| Finance | James Kelly | 2017–2019 |
| Finance | Rhoda Grant | 2019–2020 |
| Finance | Jackie Baillie | 2020–2021 |
| Justice | Daniel Johnson | 2017–2019 |
| Justice | James Kelly | 2019–2020 |
| Justice | Rhoda Grant | 2020–2021 |
| Constitution | Neil Findlay | 2017–2019 |
| Constitution | Alex Rowley | 2019–2020 |
| Constitution | Anas Sarwar | 2020–2021 |
| Education, Skills and Science | Iain Gray | 2017–2021 |
| Health and Sport | Anas Sarwar | 2017–2018 |
| Health and Sport | Monica Lennon | 2018–2021 |
| Environment, Climate Change and Land Reform | Claudia Beamish | 2017–2021 |
| Poverty | Elaine Smith | 2017–2019 |
| Poverty | David Stewart | 2019–2020 |
| Poverty | Rhoda Grant | 2020 |
| Poverty | Elaine Smith | 2020–2021 |
| Culture, Tourism and External Affairs | Claire Baker | 2017–2021 |
| Transport, Infrastructure and Connectivity | Colin Smyth | 2017–2021 |
| Communities and Equalities | Monica Lennon | 2017–2018 |
| Communities and Equalities | Alex Rowley | 2018–2019 |
| Communities and Equalities | Pauline McNeill | 2019–2021 |
| Local Government | Sarah Boyack | 2019–2021 |
| Campaigns and Party Engagement | Neil Findlay | 2017–2019 |
| Campaigns and Party Engagement | Joe Cullinane (Note: Leader of North Ayrshire Council, not a Member of the Scottish Parliament) | 2019–2021 |
| Deputy Economy | Alex Rowley | 2020–2021 |
| Parliamentary Business Manager | Rhoda Grant | 2017–2018 |
| Parliamentary Business Manager | Neil Findlay | 2018–2019 |
| Parliamentary Business Manager | Elaine Smith | 2019–2021 |

Sarwar Campaign Cabinet - 2021 Scottish Election
| Portfolio | Officeholder | Term |
|---|---|---|
| Leader | Anas Sarwar | 2021–2026 |
| Deputy Leader | Jackie Baillie | 2021–present |
| Health, Social Care and Equalities | Jackie Baillie | 2021–present |
| Economy, Jobs and Fair Work | Monica Lennon | 2021–2026 |
| Finance | Daniel Johnson | 2021–present |
| Education and Skills | Michael Marra | 2021–present |
| Environment, Climate Change and Land Reform | Sarah Boyack | 2021–present |
| Justice | Neil Bibby | 2021–present |
| Communities, Housing and Local Government | Pauline McNeill | 2021–present |
| Constitution, Europe and External Affairs | Colin Smyth | 2021–present |
| Social Security | Pam Duncan-Glancy | 2021–present |
| Culture | Claire Baker | 2021–present |
| Rural Economy and Tourism | Rhoda Grant | 2021–present |
| Transport, Infrastructure and Connectivity | Alex Rowley | 2021–present |
| Parliamentary Business Manager | James Kelly | 2021–present |
| Community Safety and Drugs Policy | James Kelly | 2021–present |
Also attending Shadow Cabinet
| Shadow Secretary of State for Scotland | Ian Murray | 2021–2024 |
| Chair of the Scottish Parliamentary Labour Party | Mark Griffin | 2021–present |
| Business, Fair Work and Skills | Mark Griffin | 2021–present |
