= 2014 Labour Party leadership election =

Labour Party leadership elections were held in the following countries in 2014:

- 2014 Labour Party leadership election (Ireland)
- 2014 New Zealand Labour Party leadership election
- 2014 Scottish Labour leadership election
- 2014 ACT Labor Party leadership election in Australia

== See also ==
- 2013 Labour Party leadership election
- 2015 Labour Party leadership election
