= 2014 Scottish Labour leadership election =

2014 Scottish Labour Party leadership election

2014 Scottish Labour Party leadership election
- 17 November 2014 – 13 December 2014
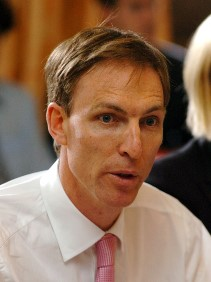

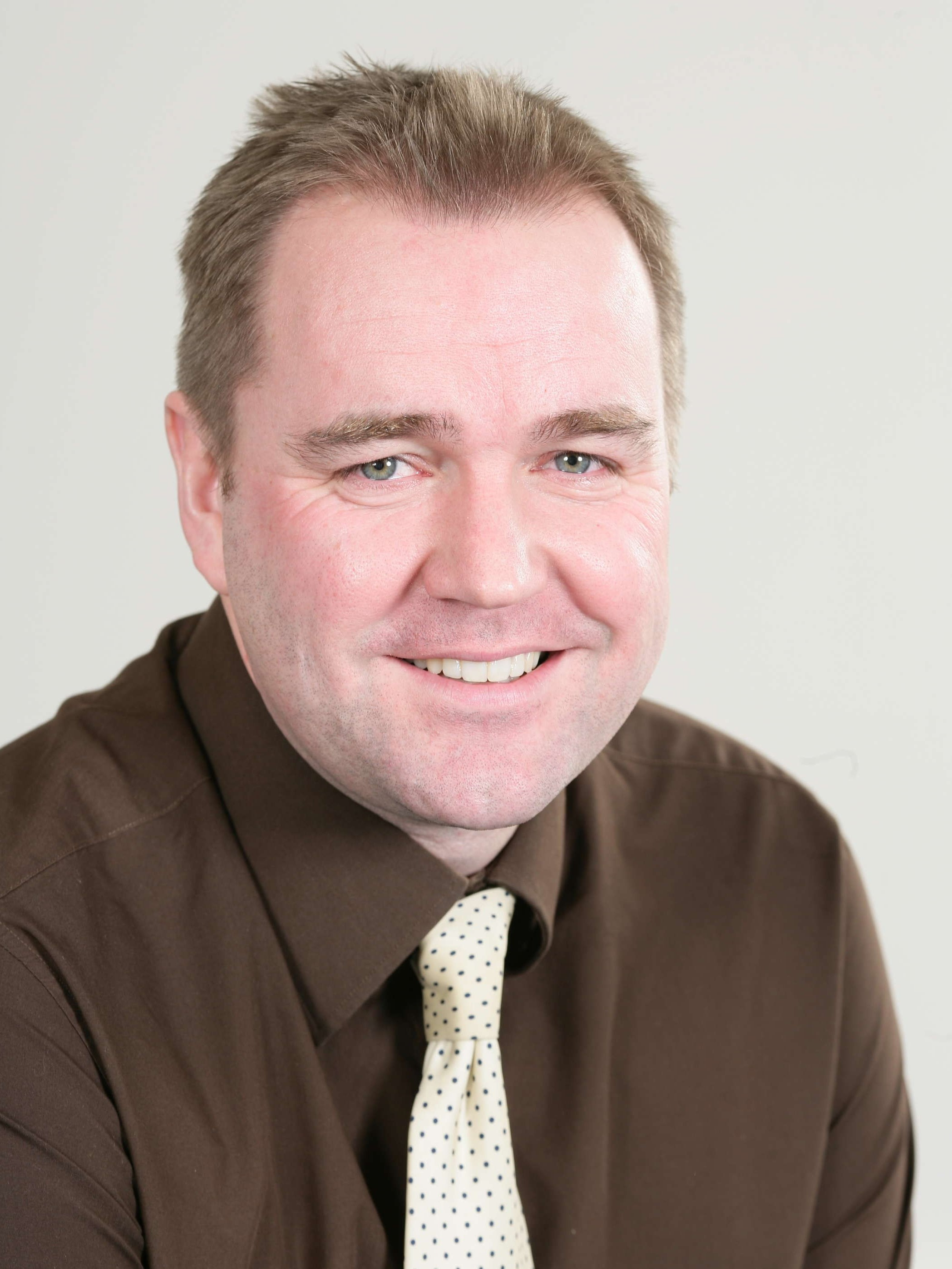

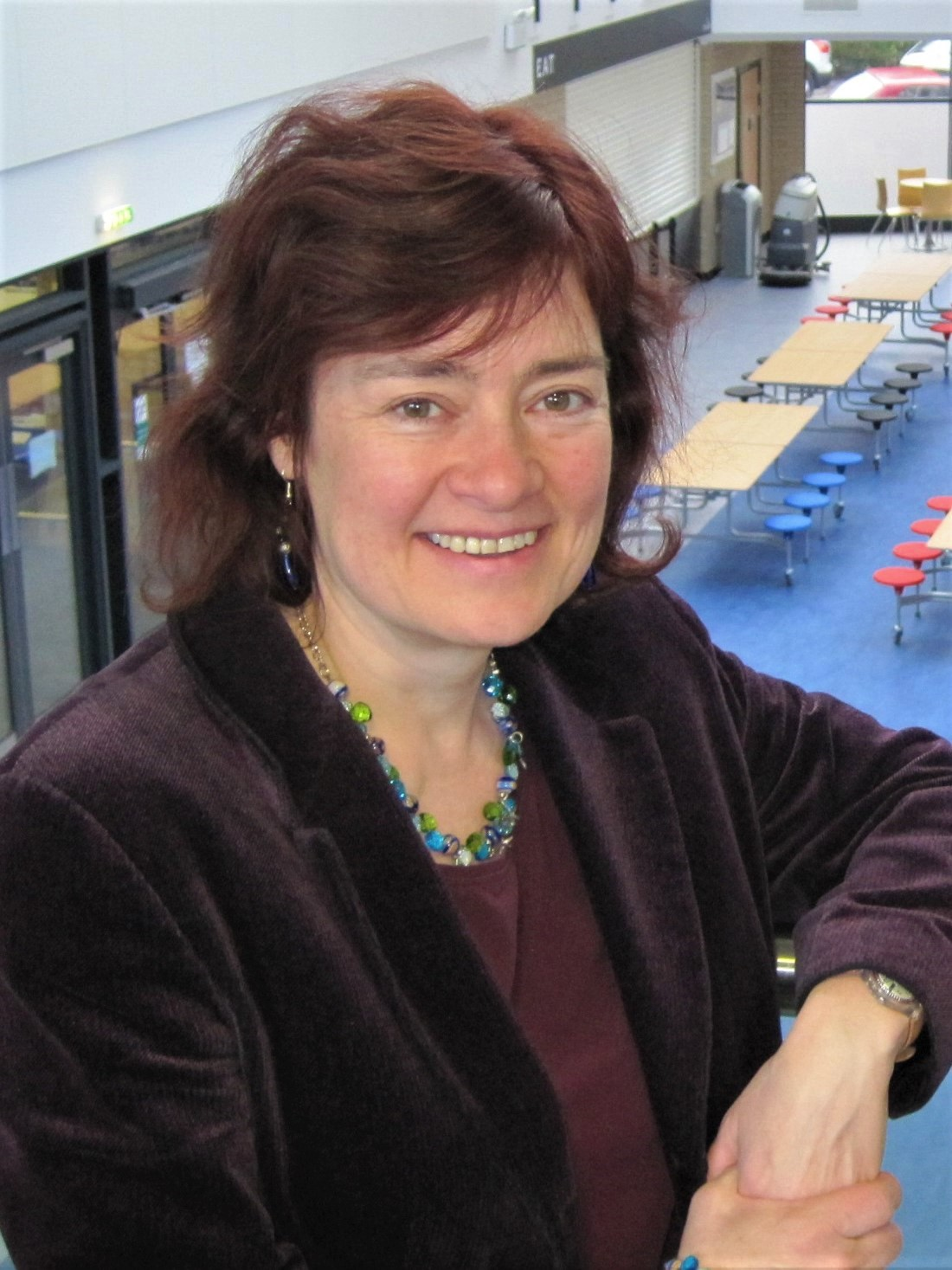
| Candidate | Jim Murphy | Neil Findlay | Sarah Boyack |
| Overall Result | 55.8% | 35.0% | 9.2% |
| Affiliated Unions | 39.8% | 52.0% | 8.2% |
| Party members | 60.4% | 32.7% | 6.9% |
| MPs, MSPs & MEPs | 67.1% | 20.3% | 12.7% |
Leader before election
Anas Sarwar (pro tempore);
previously Johann Lamont
Elected Leader
Jim Murphy

The 2014 Scottish Labour Party leadership election was an internal party election to choose a new leader and deputy leader of the Scottish Labour Party, following the resignations of Johann Lamont as leader and Anas Sarwar as deputy. Lamont announced her decision in an interview with the Daily Record on 24 October, saying that she was stepping down effective immediately because the UK Labour Party treated the Scottish party as a "branch office of London". Lamont, who had won the 2011 leadership contest, thus becoming the first Scottish leader to have authority over Labour's Scottish MPs in the House of Commons as well as in the Scottish Parliament, was the second leader of a Scottish political party to resign in the wake of the 2014 independence referendum. Before her resignation, Alex Salmond announced his intention to relinquish the role of Scottish National Party (SNP) leader and First Minister. Sarwar announced his own resignation on 30 October, saying he felt it was right for the party to elect a new leadership team.

Sarwar became interim leader following Lamont's resignation, and announced plans for the party to hold a leadership contest, with the winner to be announced on 13 December. Sarah Boyack became the first person to confirm that she would be standing as a candidate for party leader; she was subsequently joined by Neil Findlay and Jim Murphy. Katy Clark and Kezia Dugdale entered the deputy leadership race. Findlay was among those to call on former British Prime Minister Gordon Brown to enter the contest, but he ruled out doing so. Other senior Labour figures who decided not to put their names forward included Sarwar, Jackie Baillie, and Jenny Marra.

Voting took place between 17 November and 10 December using the three-tier electoral college system, which gives parliamentarians, individual members, and affiliated bodies such as trade unions an equal say in the outcome. During this time, the candidates toured Scotland for a number of hustings meetings, at which they set out their direction for the party if elected. Policy options raised were centred on issues such as health, education, employment, and the prospect of further devolution to Scotland. The three leadership candidates were from different wings of the party–Murphy from the Labour right, Boyack from the centre, and Findlay from the left. Controversy ensued when the Unite trade union issued a mock ballot paper instructing members on which candidates to elect, and when two prominent Labour figures engaged in an argument about the contest on social media. On 13 December, Murphy was elected to lead the party, while Dugdale was chosen to become his deputy. In his victory speech, Murphy said that his election was a "fresh start" for Scottish Labour.

The 2014 referendum had seen a 55 per cent vote in favour of keeping Scotland in the United Kingdom. However, opinion polls in the weeks following the referendum suggested an increased support for the SNP at Labour's expense, while SNP membership quadrupled. After his election as its leader, Murphy led Labour into the 2015 general election, which saw the party's worst-ever election result in Scotland and a landslide victory for the SNP. Labour lost all but one of its 41 Scottish Westminster seats, including Murphy's own East Renfrewshire constituency, while the SNP won 56 of the 59 seats in Scotland. Although Murphy subsequently said that he wished to remain as Scottish Labour leader, the poor result prompted senior party figures and trade unionists to question the viability of his future in the post. After narrowly surviving a vote of no confidence on 16 May, Murphy announced his intention to relinquish the role, triggering a fresh leadership contest. Dugdale was elected to succeed Murphy on 15 August.

== Background ==
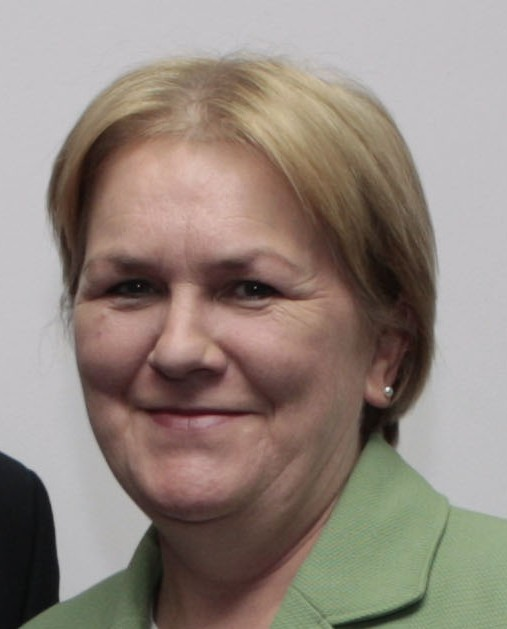
Johann Lamont was elected to lead Scottish Labour in 2011

Lamont was elected to lead the Scottish Labour Party in December 2011 following the resignation of Iain Gray, who stepped down in the wake of the party's second consecutive defeat by Alex Salmond's Scottish National Party in the 2011 Scottish Parliament election. She was the first leader to take charge of the entire Scottish Labour Party, previous leaders having only had responsibility for Labour's MSPs at Holyrood, and she initiated a review of Labour policy on issues such as devolution and the party's commitment to free universal public services. The Scotsman's Euan McColm wrote that although Lamont was given greater autonomy over Labour in Scotland, her Westminster colleagues "restrained" her attempts to develop a devolution policy, and her debate on universal benefits resulted in the SNP portraying her as "a politician dedicated to seizing from the people that which was rightfully theirs". Her leadership was further harmed by a controversy over the 2013 Falkirk candidate selection, in which the trade union Unite allegedly tried to engineer the selection process in the Falkirk constituency; an investigation into the matter was led from London rather than Edinburgh. Lamont also led the party through the 2014 referendum on Scottish independence, during which Labour joined the Conservatives and Liberal Democrats in the Better Together campaign, an alliance of parties that campaigned for a "No" vote. Lamont herself had a relatively low profile during the period prior to the poll, while Labour's association with the Conservatives was viewed as a betrayal among its traditional supporters.

The referendum was held on 18 September 2014, and saw a turnout of 3,619,915, or 85 per cent of those eligible to vote. (Note: The comparable figure was 65 per cent in the 2010 general election.) Scotland rejected independence, with a 55 per cent vote in favour of staying part of the United Kingdom. Salmond announced his resignation as SNP leader and First Minister the day after the referendum. In the subsequent leadership election, the SNP selected Nicola Sturgeon as its leader. Also on 19 September, UK Prime Minister David Cameron established the Smith Commission to look at the prospect of devolving further powers to Scotland. Chaired by Lord Smith of Kelvin, the cross-party Commission published its findings on 27 November. Among its recommendations were proposals to give the Scottish Parliament responsibility for some welfare payments and for setting income tax levels. Although it had previously been opposed to giving Holyrood greater tax powers amid concerns it could diminish the role of Scottish MPs at Westminster and lead to "independence by the back door", Labour confirmed its intention to support income tax devolution shortly before details of the Commission's report were made public.

Although Scotland had voted to remain part of the UK, the independence referendum had returned "Yes" votes in some traditional Labour strongholds, particularly Glasgow and North Lanarkshire, prompting media speculation about Lamont's future as the party's leader. Shortly after the referendum, Shadow International Development Secretary Jim Murphy put himself forward as a candidate for the party leadership; The Herald reported that party delegates concerned about the referendum results had started to view Murphy as a possible successor. Lamont had attempted to quash rumours of a leadership challenge at the 25 September 2014 session of First Minister's Questions, the first of the post-referendum era: "When the First Minister is long gone I will still be doing my job on behalf of the people of Scotland." Her position remained uncertain. The Daily Telegraph's Alan Cochrane wrote that many Labour MPs in Scotland feared losing their seats in the 2015 general election without a change of leadership. In the weeks following the referendum, SNP membership increased fourfold, reaching more than 100,000 by mid-December. Labour's membership over the same period was less clear. Paul Hutcheon noted in the 9 November edition of the Sunday Herald that Labour had "consistently declined" to confirm the number of its members in Scotland, but quoted an "informed source" suggesting the figure was slightly short of 13,500. However, Peter Jones of The Scotsman subsequently quoted a less favourable figure of fewer than 10,000, with "most of the existing constituency membership [comprising] the relatives and friends of councillors/MSPs/MPs [who] would not welcome ... an influx of new members who might try to oust second-rate post-holders in favour of somebody new and better".

In October, two former first ministers voiced their concern about the direction of the party. Jack McConnell expressed fears that Labour would experience increased difficulty in regaining the confidence of Scottish voters following the election of Nicola Sturgeon as SNP leader, and described Labour as "a political machine that is angry about what has happened in Scotland in the recent past". Shortly afterwards, his predecessor, Henry McLeish suggested Labour had ceded "enormous ground to the SNP unnecessarily" because its supporters no longer understood "what the party stands for". Margaret Curran, the Shadow Secretary of State for Scotland, said that although the party was changing, it needed to reconnect with its "socialist principles". Lamont's deputy, Anas Sarwar, later suggested that during the referendum campaign, Labour "had stopped being a movement for change and fell into a trap of being defenders of the past and defenders of the establishment". The New Statesman claimed that Labour had spent "decades treating Scotland as little more than a one-party state" and needed to "[make] itself relevant again for the people whom it was established to represent". Stephen Daisley, political editor of STV News, suggested that Labour had "responded to the Nationalist advance by electing a succession of decent but ineffectual Holyrood leaders who were dominated by the Westminster party machine".

== Resignations ==
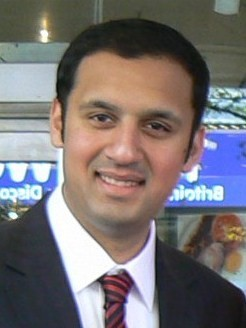
Anas Sarwar, seen here in 2011, became acting leader following Lamont's resignation.

Lamont announced her resignation in an interview with the Daily Record on 24 October 2014, saying that it was her intention to step down immediately. She told the newspaper that she was resigning because Labour's Westminster leadership had undermined her attempts to reform the party in Scotland, and had treated Scottish Labour "like a branch office of London". In her letter of resignation, submitted to Scottish Labour Party Chairman Jamie Glackin, Lamont accused "senior members of the party" of questioning her role and said that she was taking herself "out of the equation" to allow Scottish Labour to have a discussion about the best way forward. Anas Sarwar became Labour's acting leader. On 26 October, following a meeting of the party's executive committee, he outlined the details of the leadership election. It was confirmed the next day that Jackie Baillie would represent Labour in the Scottish Parliament at the following session of First Minister's Questions.

On 30 October, an IPSOS/Mori poll conducted for STV indicated that the SNP had much greater support among Scottish voters than Labour, putting the SNP at 52 per cent, compared to 23 per cent for Labour. On the same day, a YouGov poll conducted for The Times gave the two parties 43 and 27 per cent respectively. The BBC's Mark Mardell later noted that a total of four polls in October and November gave the SNP an average 20-percentage-point lead over Labour, which he suggested could allow the SNP to win as many as 30 Westminster seats from Labour in the next election. Also on 30 October, Anas Sarwar announced his resignation as deputy leader at a Scottish Labour fundraising dinner in Glasgow, triggering a deputy leadership election. Sarwar said that he disagreed with Lamont's assessment of UK Labour, and that he was stepping down because he felt that it was "right that we have a concurrent leadership and deputy leadership election. This will allow a Scottish Labour party, its members and affiliates the opportunity to not only elect a leader, but a new leadership team focused on winning in 2016."

== Election details ==
Anas Sarwar announced details of the timetable for the contest on 26 October 2014, following a meeting of Scottish Labour's executive committee. Potential candidates would be invited to declare their interest from the following day, with nominations open from 31 October to 4 November. Balloting would begin on 17 November, and the announcement of the new leader would occur on 13 December. Sarwar said that voting would be held using the three-tier electoral college, in which three groups – individual party members, parliamentarians, and affiliated bodies such as trade unions – each make up a third of the electorate. Plans to change Scottish Labour's electoral system to a one-person, one-vote ballot like that of the UK Labour Party were under review at the time of the leadership contest, but as forging ahead with these changes before the election of a new Scottish leader would delay the process, the decision was taken to use the existing method instead. Explaining this decision on the day the contest was announced, Sarwar told BBC News, "We have had unanimous agreement to get the balance right between moving quickly to elect a new leader and also allowing a period of time to have an open, frank and honest debate about the future direction of the Scottish Labour party." The deputy leadership contest followed the same timetable after Sarwar relinquished that role.

After nominations closed on 4 November, the candidates took part in a series of hustings meetings at locations around Scotland. Venues for the events were announced on 13 November, with the first set to take place in Dundee on 20 November. This would be followed by meetings in Glasgow, Dumfries, Edinburgh, Inverness, Aberdeen, and Cumbernauld. In addition, the candidates would also address the Scottish Women's Conference, the Youth and Student Conference, and the Councillors' Conference. The candidates also took part in a televised debate on a special edition of BBC Two Scotland's political programme, Scotland 2014, on 18 November. Voting closed at midday on 10 December.

== Declarations ==
Map showing candidates nominated by Scottish Labour's Westminster MP's Sarah Boyack Neil Findlay Jim Murphy Not declared

On 28 October, MSP and Shadow Local Government Minister Sarah Boyack became the first person to announce her candidacy for party leader. MSP and Shadow Health Minister Neil Findlay, and then MP and Shadow Secretary of State for International Development Jim Murphy, were the second and third candidates to declare their candidacies, on 29 October. On 1 November, Katy Clark, the MP for North Ayrshire and Arran, became the first person to join the deputy leadership race. Kezia Dugdale, an MSP for Lothian and Labour's Shadow Education Secretary at Holyrood, announced on 2 November that she would also be a deputy leadership candidate. Each candidate was required to secure ten nominations from among the 80 Scottish Labour members of the House of Commons, Scottish Parliament, and European Parliament. Of those standing in the contest, Murphy received the support of 43 parliamentarians, and Findlay and Boyack secured 12 and 10 nominations, respectively. Dugdale was backed by 51 of her colleagues and Clark had 11 nominations.

Several other prominent Labour figures declined to stand. Neil Findlay and Michael Connarty, the MP for Linlithgow and East Falkirk, both urged former Prime Minister Gordon Brown to enter the race, but he declined. Other potential candidates who decided not to run were Sarwar, who wished to concentrate on plans for the next general election, and Baillie, Holyrood's Shadow Health Secretary, who said she wanted a "supporting role" rather than to be Labour leader. Jenny Marra, Labour's deputy finance and youth employment spokeswoman, also decided not to stand. Marra was subsequently appointed to lead Murphy's campaign alongside James Kelly, MSP for Rutherglen.

== Candidates and campaigns ==
=== Leadership ===
==== Jim Murphy ====
Murphy, a former President of the National Union of Students, was first elected to the House of Commons as the MP for Eastwood in the 1997 general election. Having spent nine years at university without graduating, he worked for the Labour Party before becoming an MP. After serving in junior roles in the post-1997 Labour government, he was appointed as Secretary of State for Scotland in 2008, where he led a Scottish business mission to Shanghai and played a key role in organising the Scotland leg of Pope Benedict XVI's visit to the United Kingdom. He took charge of Labour's Scottish campaign for the 2010 general election, securing a three per cent swing to Labour in Scotland amid a defeat for the party at UK level. He became Shadow Defence Secretary after the election before moving to the post of Shadow International Development Secretary in 2013. In 2011, he co-chaired the Murphy–Boyack review of the structure of the Scottish Labour Party, and was a prominent figure in the Better Together campaign during the 2014 referendum, touring 100 towns in 100 days to campaign for a "No" vote. Commentators, such as the BBC's Aiden James and The Guardian's Severin Carrell, have described Murphy as being from the Blairite right wing of the party. Murphy launched his leadership campaign in Edinburgh on 1 November, and subsequently stepped down from the role of Shadow International Development Secretary in order to concentrate on his campaign. His bid to lead the party was backed by the Community and USDAW trade unions. He was also endorsed by Neil Kinnock, a former leader of the UK Labour Party, who donated an undisclosed sum of money to Murphy's campaign, and by Shadow Scottish Secretary Margaret Curran.

Murphy spoke of uniting Scottish Labour – and Scotland – after the referendum, and said that, if chosen to lead the party, he would stand for election to the Scottish Parliament at the 2016 election, "if not before". He claimed that a "lack of vision" and a failure to listen to Scottish voters had led to voters' deserting Labour. He suggested that it was "compulsory" that an MSP should be his deputy, and expressed support for greater devolution for Scotland. Murphy said that Scottish Labour should take greater responsibility in areas such as policy making, fundraising, and campaigning, and that funds paid to UK Labour by Scottish Labour councillors should be used exclusively for Scotland. Murphy also wanted to spend £5,000 on campaigns in every Labour-held Scottish constituency at Holyrood and Westminster, as well as seats the party planned to target at future elections, and pledged a "radical change" in Labour's campaign strategy.

He promised to introduce gender-equality legislation requiring an equal male/female representation in the Scottish Cabinet and on the boards of Scottish-based companies, and planned to appoint a Cabinet Minister for Women. He announced plans to invite the leaders of Scotland's other political parties to talks aimed at developing a strategy for the provision of services for the elderly, services which were coming under increasing pressure from an aging population. He urged Scottish Labour to support the full devolution of tax-raising powers, stating it was "as important a change for the Scottish Labour Party as the rewriting of Clause Four was for the UK Labour Party". (Note: The rewriting of Clause Four had committed the party to nationalisation.) He further said that he would introduce a 50 per cent top income tax rate for earners above £150,000 and devolve some welfare responsibilities handed to Holyrood by the Smith Commission, such as the Work Programme, to local authorities. On education, he pledged to create a facility to promote good teaching practice, introduce chartered status for teachers, and identify and provide support to secondary schools that were deemed to be failing. Unlike his two opponents, Murphy supported the continuation of the UK Trident programme, due for renewal in 2016.

==== Sarah Boyack ====
Boyack, a former planning officer and lecturer who served as chair of Scottish Labour Students and its UK-wide counterpart, Labour Students, was elected as the MSP for Edinburgh Central at the Scottish Parliament's inaugural election of 1999. She served in both the Dewar and McLeish governments, where she was Environment Minister and later Transport Minister. When McConnell succeeded McLeish in 2001, Boyack lost the Transport brief in a cabinet reshuffle and became a backbencher. After subsequently chairing the Parliament's Environmental and Rural Affairs Committee, she briefly returned to government prior to Labour's defeat in the 2007 election. She lost her Edinburgh seat in 2011 but was elected as a list MSP for the Lothian region in the same election. As well as co-chairing the Murphy–Boyack review, she served as a member of Labour's Devolution Commission in 2013. The Guardian reported that she would stand as a centrist candidate; Lesley Riddoch of The Scotsman suggested that Boyack had "an instinct for co-operation and consensus building". Boyack describes herself as a socialist. Her campaign was launched in Edinburgh on 7 November, supported by the Scottish Co-Operative Party.

Boyack said that she would be a "listening leader" who would tackle funding shortfalls in the National Health Service (NHS) and local government. She also said that she would publish 100 new ideas aimed at improving lives after meeting people during her campaign. Positioning herself as a unifying candidate who would make the party "fit for purpose", she called for "bold and radical" new approaches to policy, which would require Labour to be honest about funding crises in local government and health. (Note: She did not say whether this would require an increase in taxation, claiming the issue was "not just an issue about raising taxes... but about new opportunities as well".) She pledged that, if elected, she would work with the SNP government when she felt it was in the best interest of Scotland to do so, but said Labour would also be an effective opposition, holding the government to account when necessary.

Boyack said that as leader, she would campaign on better funding for healthcare, improvements to childcare, education and youth employment opportunities, and the devolvement of power to local government. She backed the scrapping of the Trident programme. She wanted to reform Council Tax, which had been frozen since the SNP came to power in 2007, and suggested the existing eight tax bands should be redrawn. She would allow local authorities to raise a tourism tax, while environmentally friendly power firms and bus companies would be created to raise public funds. She supported establishing a consensus on whether or not to have full tax devolution, but had "reservations" about the prospect of devolving further taxes to Holyrood. She favoured devolving welfare benefits to Scotland. She told STV's Stephen Daisley that she wished "to make Scottish Labour a force in Scottish politics again". After publishing a list of social justice-themed policies, she announced plans to establish a commission similar to the Social Justice Commission created by UK Labour leader John Smith in 1994, which had helped shape Labour policy in areas such as employment and welfare.

==== Neil Findlay ====
Findlay, a former bricklayer and teacher, was elected to Holyrood as a list MSP for Lothian in 2011, having previously been a councillor in West Lothian. Subsequently, appointed as Shadow Health Minister, he was also a member of the Red Paper Collective, a group of politicians who called on Labour to support the full devolution of income tax powers to Scotland. A BBC profile said that Findlay was "widely described as being on the left wing of his party [and] happy to describe himself as a socialist". His campaign was launched on 8 November at the Miners' Welfare Club in Fauldhouse, West Lothian, his home village, and endorsed by the trade unions ASLEF, CWU, GMB, Musicians' Union, NUM, RMT, TSSA, UCATT, UNISON, and Unite.

Policy options raised by Findlay included increasing the minimum wage, reintroduction of council house building, reduction in the use of the private sector in NHS Scotland, and allowing councils to set their own taxes to help reverse job losses within local government. He described himself as "no machine politician", and called for a return to the "timeless Labour values of community, solidarity, fairness and justice". He said that if elected as leader, his 2016 election campaign would focus on tackling youth unemployment, the introduction of a living wage, and improvements to health and social care. He said that he wanted to make the party more "autonomous" by involving its members and trade unions to create a party that was "more collective and co-operative in nature". He also expressed the desire to establish a public inquiry into the practice of trade union blacklisting. Among his plans for devolution was for Holyrood to have power over employment regulations to enable the creation of a Scottish Health and Safety Executive and the introduction of corporate culpable homicide legislation.

On gender equality, Findlay announced plans for legislation to address the gender pay gap, as well as increasing the number of women MSPs and the number of women on "the bodies that take decisions for our country". He said that he would lobby the UK government to scrap the UK Trident programme if UK Labour leader Ed Miliband became prime minister in the next election and that he wanted to renationalise the railways in Scotland, bring an end to public-private partnerships, and commit the party to full employment. He supported introducing a 50 per cent tax band "to tackle poverty and youth unemployment", but urged caution on tax devolvement to ensure Scotland did not end up "worse off". He said there would be "no privatisation of the NHS under my leadership". If elected he promised to "hit the ground running", and said he would be ready to take on SNP leader Nicola Sturgeon at the next session of First Minister's Questions.

=== Deputy leadership ===
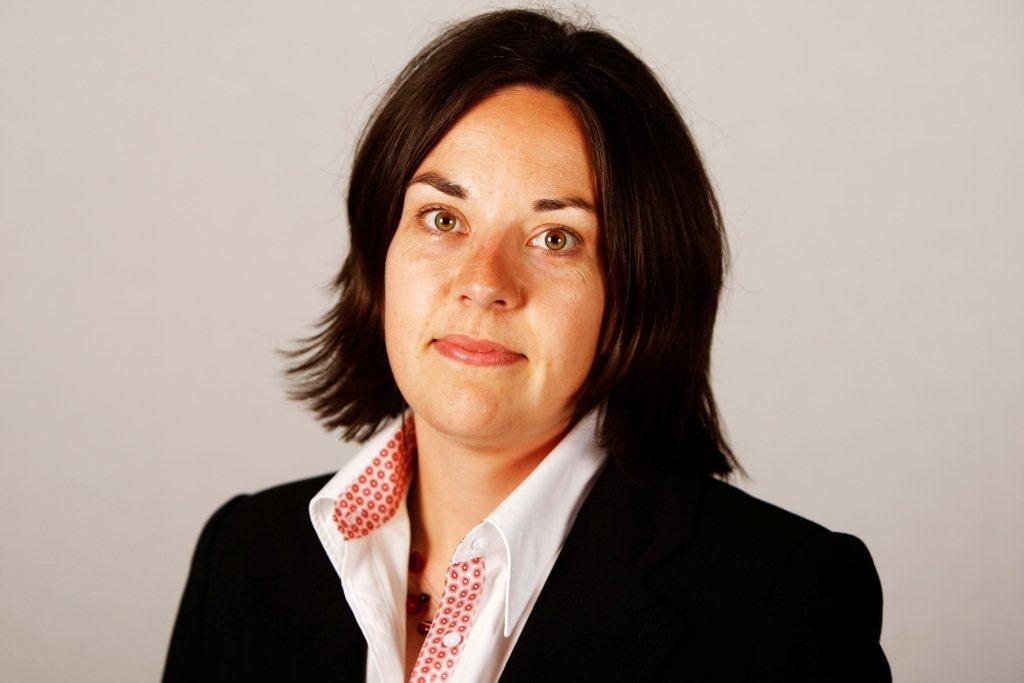
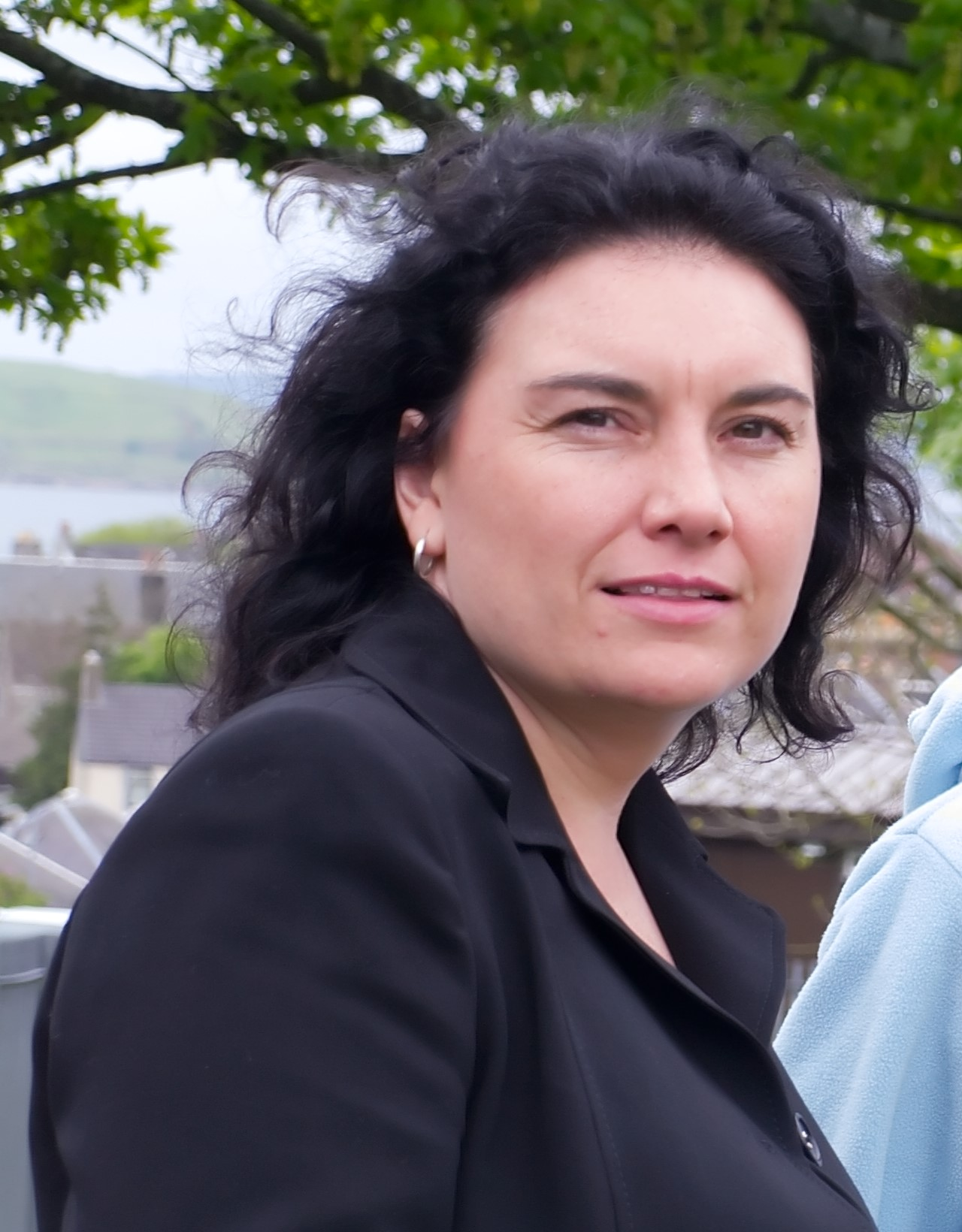
Kezia Dugdale (left) and Katy Clark (right) were the two deputy leadership candidates.

==== Kezia Dugdale ====
Dugdale, who had joined the Labour Party in 2004 after graduating from the University of Aberdeen, was elected as an MSP for the Lothian region in 2011 and later appointed to the Shadow Cabinet as Shadow Health Minister. She quickly ruled herself out of running for the leadership, but told the Edinburgh Evening News that she would consider entering a deputy leadership contest, describing herself as a "sidekick, not a superhero". She also spoke of her intention to serve no more than three terms in Parliament. Like Murphy, she secured the backing of the Community trade union. She was also endorsed by the Scottish Co-Operative Party.

Dugdale talked of improving employment, wages, education, and childcare, saying that she stood for "tomorrow's Scotland – a country free from poverty and injustice, with opportunity for everyone". Many of the parliamentarians who nominated Dugdale for deputy leader also endorsed Murphy's leadership bid, but she ruled out standing with Murphy on a joint ticket. She suggested taxing bankers in order to pay for jobs.

==== Katy Clark ====
Clark, a former solicitor with UNISON, joined the Labour Party at the age of 17. She was elected to the House of Commons as the MP for North Ayrshire and Arran in the 2005 general election. The Ardrossan and Saltcoats Herald reported that as a parliamentarian, she developed a reputation as a party rebel who, at the time of the leadership contest, had most recently voted against British participation in the 2014 military intervention against the Islamic State of Iraq and the Levant. She won the support of UNISON after announcing her intention to enter the deputy leadership contest, and was also backed by the Communication Workers' Union, Unite, the GMB, and the Musicians' Union.

Clark spoke of a need to recognise "that Scottish politics has changed and it can't be business as usual." Policy areas she intended to focus on included improvements in employment, housing, and public services, which she said were "prevented for too many by wealth being held in the hands of a minority." She also spoke of reaching out to people she claimed had "abandoned hope in Labour" or voted for independence, and said that the party needed to "take a new path" because people wanted social and economic change, which previous Labour governments had not delivered. Among the policies she supported were renationalisation of the railways, introducing free childcare for children over the age of twelve months, introducing a living wage, and the abolition of both the Trident programme and student tuition fees. She also claimed that Labour in Scotland had "been taken to the political abyss" by "New Labour and its architects". She claimed that Labour would find it harder to be re-elected unless she was chosen as its deputy leader.

=== Controversy ===
While Labour distributed ballot packs to its members, the trade unions were responsible for sending out literature relating to the contest to their members, leading to concerns from each side about the content of the other's election material. After Labour included only the endorsements of parliamentarians in an information booklet sent to individual members, the Unite union wrote to Iain McNicol, the party's general secretary, to ask why details of support from organisations, such as trade unions, was omitted. Unite said that the decision unfairly favoured Murphy, and the union suggested that it and other unions would make a formal complaint, if necessary. Pat Rafferty, secretary of Unite's Scottish branch, described the incident as "a gross error of judgment". On 30 November, Sunday Herald journalist Paul Hutcheon reported that along with voting packs, Unite had also sent its members a "mock ballot paper" instructing them to vote for Findlay and Clark, while the GMB union had also included material endorsing Findlay and Clark as their preferred candidates. Hutcheon quoted an unnamed senior Labour Party source, who described the actions as "absolutely desperate stuff from Unite".

Following a Sunday Herald article in which the Labour MP Tom Watson suggested Murphy's election would be "disastrous" for the party, he and Ivan Lewis, the Shadow Secretary of State for Northern Ireland, engaged in a heated exchange on Twitter during which Lewis accused Watson of manipulating past UK Labour leadership contests and of wanting to influence the election of the party's next Scottish leader. Watson, who had resigned as a defence minister in 2006 after suggesting that Tony Blair should step down as Prime Minister, rejected claims that he had sought to manipulate previous Labour leadership contests.

On 10 December, David Robertson, the moderator-elect of the Free Church of Scotland, expressed concerns that Murphy had been subject to religious discrimination after Gary Otton, leader of the Scottish Secular Society, posted several threads on Facebook commenting on the leadership candidate's Roman Catholic faith and his support for denominational schools. The posts described Murphy as a "Catholic fanatic" and a "Pope Benedict fan". Robertson said that Murphy "should be judged on his political views and abilities, not what church he belongs to". Otton rejected claims of sectarianism, but said that the Society was concerned that Murphy's beliefs would "influence his political decisions". Murphy described the practice of religious intolerance as "stupid" and "sickening".

== Results ==
=== Leadership ===
| Candidate | Affiliated members (33.3%) | Individual members (33.3%) | Elected members (33.3%) | Overall Result |
|---|---|---|---|---|
| Jim Murphy | 39.8% | 60.4% | 67.1% | 55.8% |
| Neil Findlay | 52.0% | 32.7% | 20.3% | 35.0% |
| Sarah Boyack | 8.2% | 6.9% | 12.7% | 9.2% |

=== Deputy leadership ===
| Candidate | Affiliated members (33.3%) | Individual members (33.3%) | Elected members (33.3%) | Overall Result |
|---|---|---|---|---|
| Kezia Dugdale | 36.4% | 66.4% | 85.9% | 62.9% |
| Katy Clark | 63.6% | 33.6% | 14.1% | 37.1% |

The result of the election was announced on 13 December 2014 at Glasgow's Emirates Arena; Murphy secured an overall majority with 55.8 per cent of the vote in the first round. His closest rival was Findlay with 35.0 per cent, while Boyack was third with 9.2 per cent. Murphy also won majorities in two groups of Labour's three-tier electoral college system, securing the support of parliamentarians and individual members. Findlay was backed by the majority of party affiliates. In the first round of the deputy leadership race, Dugdale secured 62.9 per cent of the vote compared to 37.1 per cent for Clark. Dugdale was also backed by parliamentarians and individual party members, while affiliates gave their majority support to Clark. In his victory speech, Murphy said that his election marked a "fresh start" for Scottish Labour: "Scotland is changing and so too is Scottish Labour. I'm ambitious for our party because I'm ambitious for our country". He also said that he planned to defeat the SNP in 2016, and that he would use the increased powers being devolved to Holyrood to end poverty and inequality. Urging Labour voters who had backed independence to support his vision for the party, he claimed Labour had "so much more in common with [those who] voted 'Yes' in the referendum than we do with many of the political leaders who campaigned for 'No' on the 18th of September". In her speech, Dugdale said that the party's "focus has to be on the future – a Scottish Labour party that's fighting fit and fighting for our future".

== Aftermath ==
Murphy was congratulated on his leadership victory by Miliband, who said he would be "standing shoulder to shoulder with Jim in the campaign to get David Cameron out at the general election." Sturgeon also welcomed his election, and spoke of her hope that they could "find common ground and work together in the best interests of people in Scotland". Scottish Conservative Party leader Ruth Davidson also congratulated Murphy on his election, but claimed he would "have his hands full" when it came to getting Labour elected, and that it would "take more than a 100-town tour to persuade people in Scotland to put Ed Miliband in Downing Street."

Map showing the preferred candidate of each Labour MP Jim Murphy Neil Findlay Sarah Boyack

In what a Scottish Labour spokesman described as a bid to "encourage transparency", the party took the decision to publish details of how its parliamentarians had voted during the ballot, a process that had previously been kept private. Those results showed that the parliamentarians who chose Murphy as their first candidate included Baillie, Brown, Curran, Dugdale, Gray, Kelly, Marra, and Sarwar. The MSPs Claudia Beamish, Rhoda Grant, and Lewis Macdonald were among those to vote for Boyack, while Findlay was backed by Clark, Ian Davidson, and Lamont. In the deputy leadership contest, Baillie, Boyack, Brown, Connarty, Curran, Gray, Kelly, Marra, Murphy, and Sarwar were among those to vote for Dugdale, while Clark's first preference voters included Connarty, Ian Davidson, Findlay, and Lamont. Having chosen Findlay and Boyack as first and second preferences, Lamont did not vote for a third, while Sarwar chose only first preferences in both elections. Murphy and Dugdale also chose no alternative preferences, Murphy voting for himself and Dugdale, and she doing likewise. The full results of the leadership contest were as follows:

=== Party direction and shadow cabinet appointments ===
Speaking to BBC Radio 5 Live following his election, Murphy said that while he disagreed with the "branch office" theory, he would not be consulting London on policy: "[t]he days in which anyone needed permission from the Labour Party anywhere else in the United Kingdom to make a decision about what happens in Scotland are gone and they're gone for good." On the 14 December edition of BBC One's Sunday Politics Scotland, he repeated his pledge to seek election to the Scottish Parliament, and said that he was "determined" to retain every Westminster seat held by Labour. The following day, he announced plans to rewrite Scottish Labour's constitution to give the party greater autonomy over its affairs and bring it "closer to the centre of Scottish life." On 17 December, Murphy announced that he had been given a Holyrood security pass and would be establishing a presence in the Scottish Parliament Building.

On 16 December, Murphy announced the lineup of his Shadow Cabinet, which included posts for the two people who had stood against him in the leadership contest. Findlay was appointed to the Fair Work, Skills and Training portfolio, while Boyack became Shadow Minister for Rural Affairs, Food and Environment. Baillie was handed the post of Shadow Minister for Finance, Constitution and Economy, while Marra took on Health, Wellbeing and Sport. Other appointments to Labour's frontbench team were Mary Fee (Infrastructure, Investment and Cities), Gray (Education and Lifelong Learning), Ken Macintosh (Social Justice, Communities and Pensioners' Rights), Hugh Henry (Justice), Claire Baker (Culture, Europe and External Affairs), Kelly (Parliamentary Business Manager), Neil Bibby (Chief Whip), and Graeme Pearson (Enterprise). It was also announced that Dugdale would speak for Labour at First Minister's Questions. Lamont did not have a place in the new cabinet, but Murphy stated that she had not wanted one: "Johann and I have been in touch with one another; she has wished me well. I'm looking forward to getting together with her, but Johann wasn't looking for a job in today's reshuffle. I think Johann will be a big part of the Scottish Labour Party for years to come".

=== 2015 general election and resignation of Murphy ===
Murphy took the party into the 2015 United Kingdom general election, which saw a majority win for the Conservatives, and Labour's worst-ever election result in Scotland. There was a landslide shift towards the SNP, which took 56 of the 59 Scottish seats at Westminster, while Labour lost 40 of the 41 Westminster seats it was defending. Notable losses included Murphy's constituency of East Renfrewshire and Brown's former constituency of Kirkcaldy and Cowdenbeath, previously Labour's safest seat in Scotland. (Note: Brown had previously held the seat with a 23,000 majority, but did not stand in the 2015 election.) Other high-profile figures such as Sarwar, Clark, Curran, Ian Davidson, and Shadow Foreign Secretary Douglas Alexander also lost their seats. Following his defeat, Murphy spoke of his intention to stand for a Holyrood seat in 2016. However, the result prompted Labour figures and those in the trade union movement to question the future of his leadership. Ian Davidson suggested that it would be difficult for Murphy to remain as Scottish Labour leader without a parliamentary seat and in the wake of such a heavy defeat. Rafferty, and Kevin Lindsay of ASLEF, called for his resignation, while Findlay, and Labour's local government spokesman Alex Rowley, expressed their concerns about the party's future under Murphy's leadership and resigned from his shadow cabinet.

After narrowly surviving a vote of no confidence by 17 votes to 14 at a meeting of the party's Executive Committee in Glasgow on 16 May 2015, Murphy announced that he would step down as Leader of the Scottish Labour Party in June. Stating that he wanted to have a successor in place by the summer, he confirmed that he would no longer be standing for a seat in the Scottish Parliament. Before relinquishing the leadership role, Murphy drew up proposals for a number of party reforms, including the adoption of a one-member, one-vote ballot for future leadership contests. His resignation took effect on 13 June after his reforms had been provisionally accepted by Labour's executive committee. A timetable was also set out that would see a new leader elected on 15 August, while Gray was appointed as acting leader. Dugdale and Macintosh stood in the contest to choose Murphy's successor; Dugdale was subsequently elected as Scottish Labour's new leader with a 72% share of the vote. At the same time, Rowley became her deputy.
