= 2019 Labor Party leadership election =

Labour Party leadership elections were held in the following countries during 2019:

- 2019 Australian Labor Party leadership election
  - 2019 New South Wales Labor Party leadership election
- 2019 Israeli Labor Party leadership election

== See also ==
- 2018 Labour Party leadership election
- 2020 Labour Party leadership election
