= Johann Lamont =

Scottish Labour politician

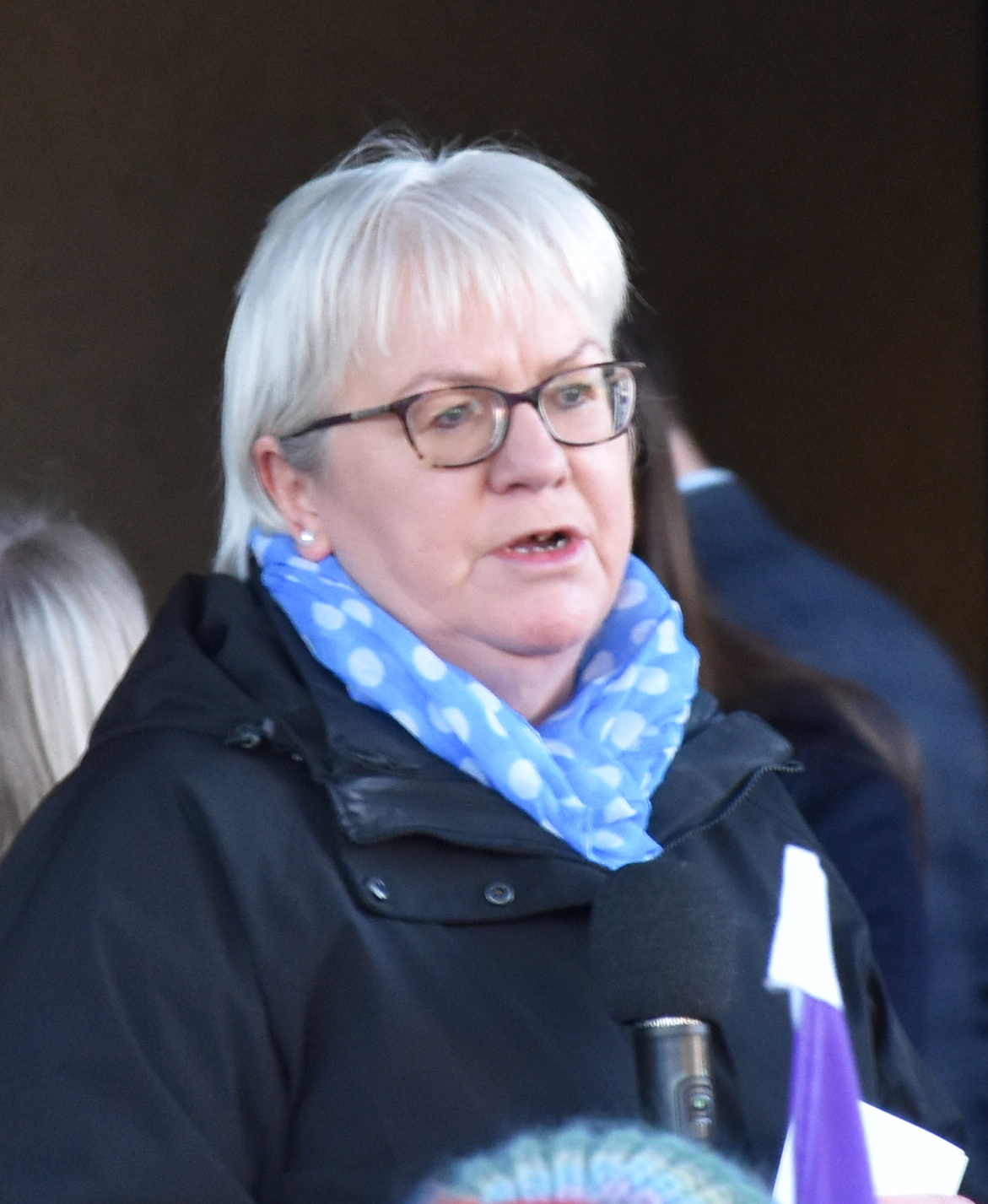
- Lamont in 2022

Leader of the Scottish Labour Party
- In office 17 December 2011 – 24 October 2014
- Deputy: Anas Sarwar
- UK party leader: Ed Miliband
- Preceded by: Iain Gray
- Succeeded by: Jim Murphy (Note: Anas Sarwar acted from 24 October 2014 to 13 December 2014)
Further offices 1999‍–‍2021
Member of the Scottish Parliament for Glasgow (1 of 7 Regional MSPs)
In office 5 May 2016 – 5 May 2021
Deputy Leader of the Scottish Labour Party
In office 13 September 2008 – 17 December 2011
Leader	Iain Gray
Preceded by	Cathy Jamieson
Succeeded by	Anas Sarwar
Deputy Minister for Justice
In office 16 November 2006 – 17 May 2007
First Minister	Jack McConnell
Preceded by	Hugh Henry
Succeeded by	Fergus Ewing
Deputy Minister for Communities
In office 6 October 2004 – 16 November 2006
First Minister	Jack McConnell
Preceded by	Mary Mulligan
Succeeded by	Des McNulty
Member of the Scottish Parliament for Glasgow Pollok
In office 6 May 1999 – 24 March 2016
Preceded by	Constituency established
Succeeded by	Humza Yousaf

Personal details
- Born: Johann MacDougall Lamont; 11 July 1957 (age 69) Glasgow, Scotland
- Party: Scottish Labour Co-operative
- Spouse: Archie Graham
- Children: 2
- Education: Woodside Secondary School
- Alma mater: University of Glasgow; Jordanhill College
- Profession: Teacher, Politician

Johann MacDougall Lamont (/ˈdʒoʊæn læmʌnt/; born 11 July 1957) is a Scottish Labour Co-operative politician who served as Leader of the Scottish Labour Party from 2011 to 2014. She was previously a junior Scottish Executive minister from 2004 to 2007 and Deputy Leader of the Scottish Labour Party from 2008 until her election to the leadership in 2011. In addition to her ministerial and leadership roles, she has been a campaigner on equality issues and violence against women throughout her political career.

Born in Glasgow, Lamont attended Woodside Secondary School and obtained a degree from the University of Glasgow. After studying for teaching qualifications at Jordanhill College, she became a schoolteacher. Active in the Labour Party since she was at university, Lamont served on its Scottish Executive Committee, and chaired it in 1993. With the establishment of a devolved legislature in Scotland, she was elected as the Member of the Scottish Parliament (MSP) for Glasgow Pollok in 1999. Having been appointed convener of the Scottish Parliament's Social Justice Committee in 2001, she obtained her first ministerial role in a Labour–Liberal Democrat coalition in October 2004 and served until its defeat by the Scottish National Party (SNP) in 2007.

Lamont stood for the Scottish Labour leadership following the resignation of Iain Gray in the wake of the party's defeat at the 2011 Scottish Parliament election; its second consecutive defeat. Following a review of how the Labour Party in Scotland would be structured, she became its first overall leader. She stated Labour lost the 2011 election because it had lost direction, and initiated a review of Scottish Labour policy on issues like devolution and the party's commitment to free universal public services. Following the SNP Government's announcement of a referendum on Scottish independence, she was a key figure in the Better Together campaign; a cross-party movement that sought to keep Scotland part of the United Kingdom. She resigned as Scottish Labour leader in October 2014, making the announcement in a Daily Record interview in which she claimed that senior figures within the UK Labour Party had undermined her attempts to reform the Scottish party, and treated it "like a branch office of London". Following a leadership election to replace her, she was succeeded in December 2014 by former Secretary of State for Scotland Jim Murphy.

Lamont's work as Scottish Labour leader won her accolades at the Scottish Politician of the Year Awards, for Political Impact of the Year in 2012 and Debater of the Year in 2013. In parliamentary debates, she was perceived by commentators such as The Scotsman's Andrew Whitaker as being an effective opponent to First Minister Alex Salmond, but others, including Richard Seymour of The Guardian, criticised her for clumsiness during television interviews.

== Early life and teaching career ==
Johann MacDougall Lamont was born in the Anderston district of Glasgow on 11 July 1957. Her parents, Archie and Effie, were both Gaelic speakers from crofting families on the Inner Hebridean island of Tiree, who met after both had moved to Glasgow. Archie was a carpenter employed by the Scottish ferry operator Caledonian MacBrayne, working on the Mallaig to Skye route. He took part in the Seamen's Strike of 1966. The family were Presbyterians, and Lamont's mother was influenced in her faith by the American evangelist Billy Graham. Her first experiences of public speakers was listening to the preachers her mother took her to see as a girl.

Lamont's childhood was divided between Glasgow and her mother's family home on Tiree, where she and her brother David spent their summer holidays. She attended Woodside Secondary School, having declined to take scholarship exams for selective education. Like her parents, she was a Gaelic speaker, but she did not believe she spoke it well enough, and she dropped it at school in favour of French and German. It was also at school that she first developed an interest in politics, once entering a Daily Mirror competition with a politically-themed short story. The tale, whose central character discussed her intention to demand a pay rise and was finally revealed to be the Queen, won Lamont third prize. She studied English and History at the University of Glasgow, graduating with an MA. Joining the Labour Party in 1975, she was active in Glasgow University Labour Club where she was a contemporary of fellow Labour politician Margaret Curran, and was also involved with the women's movement. She trained as a teacher for a year at Jordanhill College, gaining a Postgraduate Certificate in Education, and afterwards joined Rothesay Academy, as a teacher in 1979. She taught at Springburn Academy in Glasgow from 1982 to 1989 and at Castlemilk High School, also in Glasgow, from 1990 to 1999. Lamont taught English and worked with social workers and educational psychologists attempting to tackle instances of school truancy.

Continuing to be active in the Labour Party, Lamont became a prominent campaigner on issues related to social justice, equality and devolution. Although she had voted no in the 1979 referendum that proposed the establishment of a Scottish Assembly, during the 1980s and 1990s she was a representative on the Scottish Constitutional Convention, the body that paved the way for Scottish devolution. Of her 1979 decision, Lamont has said that she "came from the strand on the left which saw the politics of nationalism as a diversion from more central aims [but later] came to see the parliament as a vehicle for democratic change in Scotland." She was a member of the Scottish Executive Committee of the Labour Party, serving as chair in 1993.

== MSP for Glasgow Pollok ==
Although a Labour activist for two decades, Lamont had not sought election to the House of Commons during that time, telling a 2014 BBC interview there were few chances for women to be elected to Westminster: "In 1987 Labour sent down 50 MPs and only one of them was a woman." Instead, her decision to seek political office was influenced by the creation of the Scottish Parliament. Speaking to The Herald in 2011, she said, "It is easy to forget what a great opportunity it was for women and I was determined that women would be represented, would have a strong voice." The parliament was established as a result of the 1997 referendum that saw a 74% vote in favour of devolving legislative powers to Scotland. Lamont was first elected as the Member of the Scottish Parliament (MSP) for Glasgow Pollok in 1999. She held the seat in 2003, when she faced a strong challenge from the Scottish Socialist Party leader Tommy Sheridan, and then again in 2007 and 2011.

During her maiden speech on 17 May 1999, Lamont was the first MSP to use Gaelic at a sitting of the Parliament. She served on a number of the Parliament's committees during her first term in office, including the Equal Opportunities Committee, the Local Government Committee and the Social Justice Committee. She became convener of the Social Justice Committee in 2001. In 2000 she became the first Labour MSP to rebel against the Labour-led administration when she threatened to lead backbenchers in voting against a planned Scottish Executive attempt to block the Abolition of Poindings and Warrant Sales Bill, which had been introduced by Sheridan. The move resulted in the withdrawal of the amendment, and a crucial parliamentary vote in favour of the legislation. At a session of First Minister's Questions in 2002, she narrowly avoided becoming the first MSP to be ejected from the parliament after continuing to speak when Presiding Officer David Steel had told her to sit down. Steel felt her supplementary question about youth crime was too long, but the incident led to a heated parliamentary debate, and accusations from Lamont's colleague, Labour's Helen Eadie that the Presiding Officer was not treating male and female MSPs equally, an allegation he rejected.

== Frontbench politics ==
Lamont was appointed convener of the Communities Committee in 2003. In March 2004 the Committee endorsed a bill aimed at tackling antisocial behaviour, which included plans for parenting orders and the electronic tagging of youths under the age of 16. First Minister Jack McConnell made her Deputy Minister for Communities in the Scottish Executive in October 2004. In that post she was responsible for the launch of a radio and television advertising campaign aimed at tackling domestic abuse that aired over Christmas 2005, and she expressed concerns over the level of discrimination faced by travellers and gypsies after the issue was highlighted in a 2005 Scottish Parliament report.

In November 2006, Lamont was appointed Deputy Minister for Justice and oversaw reforms to Scotland's Lower Courts system. She held the post until Labour was defeated at the 2007 election. McConnell appointed her as Labour's spokesperson for Communities and Sport in his post-election frontbench team, a role she retained in the shadow cabinet formed by his successor, Wendy Alexander, in September 2007. Following Alexander's decision to step down as leader of the Labour MSPs in June 2008, and Cathy Jamieson's subsequent resignation as her deputy, Lamont stood against fellow MSP Bill Butler for the position vacated by Jamieson. She was elected as deputy leader in September 2008 with 60.16 per cent of the vote, against 39.82 per cent for Butler. At the same time, Iain Gray was elected to lead the Labour group at Holyrood.

In addition to her deputy leadership role, Lamont was appointed Chief of Staff with special responsibility for Equalities. While in that post she gave her support to Scottish Government plans to introduce a Bill outlawing forced marriage, which was announced in September 2010. In February 2011, she criticised Scottish Conservative MSP and Justice Committee Convener, Bill Aitken after the Sunday Herald quoted him making a controversial statement about a rape victim, and later welcomed his subsequent resignation. As Gray's deputy Lamont also represented Labour at First Minister's Questions in his absence. At a session of First Minister's Questions in October 2009, she raised the issue of the Scottish Futures Trust with Deputy First Minister Nicola Sturgeon, asking whether the public body planned to spend any money on improving school infrastructure before the 2011 election.

== Leader of the Scottish Labour Party ==
=== Leadership election ===
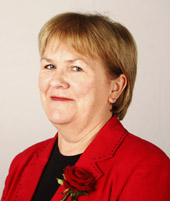
Official parliamentary portrait, 2011

In the wake of Labour's second defeat at the Scottish Parliament election of May 2011, which saw the Scottish National Party (SNP) form its first majority government, Gray announced his intention to step down as leader of the Labour MSPs later that year. A review chaired by Jim Murphy and Sarah Boyack into the party's structure in Scotland subsequently concluded that the next leader should lead the entire Scottish Labour Party rather than just its MSPs, as previous leaders had. Lamont declared her candidacy for the leadership election in September 2011 and launched her campaign on 7 November at Stirling University. She told delegates that Labour needed to reengage with the electorate if it wanted to govern again: "We must listen and learn, show humility and seek again to talk for and to people's ambitions and concerns. Our real challenge is that we in Labour lost our way, lost our confidence and lost Scotland."

Lamont's opponents in the leadership race were the MP Tom Harris, and her fellow MSP Ken Macintosh, both of whom had also expressed a need for Labour to change if it was to win the next election. Harris's campaign centred on the belief that Labour had to "[re-establish] itself as the party of aspiration", or it would risk becoming "an irrelevance". Macintosh felt the party had focused too heavily on its traditional support in the Central Belt while paying less attention to rural communities. He suggested increasing government help to tackle unemployment among young people, and wanted to nationalise rail and bus services.

The result of the election was announced on 17 December 2011 and saw Lamont secure an overall majority with 51.77% of the vote in the first round. Her closest rival was Macintosh with 40.28%, while Harris was third with 7.95%. Lamont also won majorities in two groups of Labour's three-tier electoral college system, securing the support of parliamentarians and affiliated bodies such as trade unions. Macintosh was backed by the majority of individual party members. In her acceptance speech, Lamont told party activists, "Together we will change the Scottish Labour Party and win the chance to serve the people of Scotland again and make Scotland all that we know it can be." On the same day, MP Anas Sarwar was elected to the position of Deputy that Lamont had vacated.

=== Shadow Cabinet ===
Lamont began appointing members of her shadow cabinet on 19 December 2011. Those given positions on her initial frontbench team include Macintosh (Shadow Cabinet Secretary for Finance, Employment and Sustainable Growth), Hugh Henry (Labour spokesman for Education and Lifelong Learning), Lewis Macdonald (Shadow Justice Minister) and Boyack (Local Government and Planning). The post of Shadow Health Minister was given to Jackie Baillie, who had held the position previously. Gray was not included, as he had expressed a wish to take a break from frontline politics.

Lamont announced a major shakeup of the Labour frontbench team on 28 June 2013. Gray returned to replace Macintosh as the party's finance spokesman. Macdonald was appointed chief whip, and his previous role as Shadow Justice Minister was given to Graeme Pearson. Baillie was moved from Health to Social Justice and Welfare. Boyack kept her role in Local Government and Planning. Speaking about the reshuffle, Lamont said, "We have made a great deal of progress in the last 18 months but we have to keep moving forward."

=== First months in office ===
Lamont gave her first post-election interview to The Politics Show Scotland on 18 December 2011, speaking of the "huge challenge" of rebuilding public trust in Scottish Labour after its election defeat of the previous May, and a general decline in support over the preceding decade. Attributing the party's losses to its failure to engage with the electorate, she told the programme that Labour needed to speak up for the interests of the Scottish people, and accept more devolved powers for the Scottish Parliament. Attending her first session of First Minister's Questions as Labour leader on 22 December 2011, she addressed the issue of child neglect following the conviction of a Glasgow woman for the murder of her son and asking what lessons could be learned from the case.

In January 2012, as the SNP Government prepared for a referendum on Scottish independence, she spoke out in defence of Scotland's position in the United Kingdom after First Minister Salmond claimed that the country was not an equal partner in the union. Along with Ruth Davidson and Willie Rennie, the respective leaders of the Scottish Conservatives and the Scottish Liberal Democrats, and Deputy First Minister Sturgeon, Lamont added her signature to a February 2012 letter urging Glasgow City Council to decline an application by the Scottish Defence League to stage a march through the city. The group, an offshoot of the far-right English Defence League, subsequently withdrew their application, and a "static" demonstration was held instead.

Lamont gave her first conference speech as party leader at Scottish Labour's conference in March 2012, setting out an agenda for rebuilding confidence in the party. Later the same month she welcomed the passing of the Scotland Bill, which devolved further powers to Scotland in accordance with the recommendations of the Calman Commission, praising it as "an important development of devolution". In May 2012 she participated in the Scottish Parliament debate paying tribute to Queen Elizabeth as the UK celebrated her Diamond Jubilee. Lamont commented, "60 years in the one job is good going – I've been in this one for just six months and some days, I have to say, it feels like 60 years – so we recognise the scale of the achievement of the particular, very strong woman." Lamont was a guest on the 7 June 2012 edition of the BBC's political debate programme Question Time.

=== Standing in the polls ===
A poll conducted by Ipsos MORI in December 2011 as Lamont took control of Scottish Labour indicated that the party had an approval rating of 26%, almost half that of the Scottish National Party with 51%. A survey by the same organisation in June 2012 showed an improvement for Labour, with 32% against the Nationalists' 45%. The same poll indicated a personal approval rating for Lamont of 9%, compared to 13% for Salmond. A poll conducted by Ipsos MORI on behalf of STV in September 2013 indicated that 37% of respondents were satisfied with Labour's performance compared to 41% for the SNP. That survey found that Lamont had a personal approval rating of +6%, against +8% for Salmond. Another Ipsos MORI poll for STV in December 2013 showed Labour on 34% with 36% for the SNP, while Lamont had overtaken Salmond in terms of personal approval with +9 for her compared to +7 for the First Minister.

A poll on the issue of Scottish independence conducted by TNS-BMRB in December 2013 gave Lamont an approval rating of 6% among women and 8% among men, compared with 22% and 30% respectively for Salmond. 41% of respondents to that survey were unaware of her role as Scottish Labour leader, a figure rising to 62% among those aged 16–34.

=== Local elections and by-elections ===
Lamont launched Labour's 2012 local election campaign in Edinburgh on 17 April 2012, setting out policies for creating employment and training opportunities as well as improvements to education and childcare. Claiming that the SNP Government had passed on 89 per cent of the spending cuts imposed by the UK Government, she compared the Nationalists to the businessman criticised for his role in the financial collapse of Glasgow Rangers Football Club, saying, "Putting the SNP in charge of a council is like putting Craig Whyte in charge of your tax return." Retaining control of Glasgow City Council, where Labour was facing a strong challenge from the SNP, was another of the party's key objectives. After the polls, political academic John Curtice, writing for The Guardian, observed that Lamont "has undoubtedly done enough to dispel doubts about whether she was the right woman for the job".

The 2013 Dunfermline by-election was triggered by the resignation of the SNP's Bill Walker in the wake of his conviction on several accounts of domestic abuse. On the eve of the poll, Alan Cochrane of The Daily Telegraph described it as an election Labour could not afford to lose because, "For [Lamont's] personal prestige, her candidate simply must win." Labour won the seat with a swing of 7 per cent from the SNP and a majority of 2,873. Lamont said that the result reflected "the progress we've made", but Curtice said that if the results were repeated across Scotland, the SNP would still be the majority party at the next election.

Labour also increased their support at other by-elections. At the 2013 Aberdeen Donside by-election in June, held after the death of the SNP's Brian Adam, Labour reduced the SNP majority from 7,789 to 2,025. The 2014 Cowdenbeath by-election was held following the death of Labour MSP Helen Eadie. The campaign was fought on issues such as education, employment and care for the elderly, and saw Labour increase their share of the vote, with an 11.25 per cent swing from the SNP and a majority of 5,488.

=== Scottish independence and enhanced devolution ===
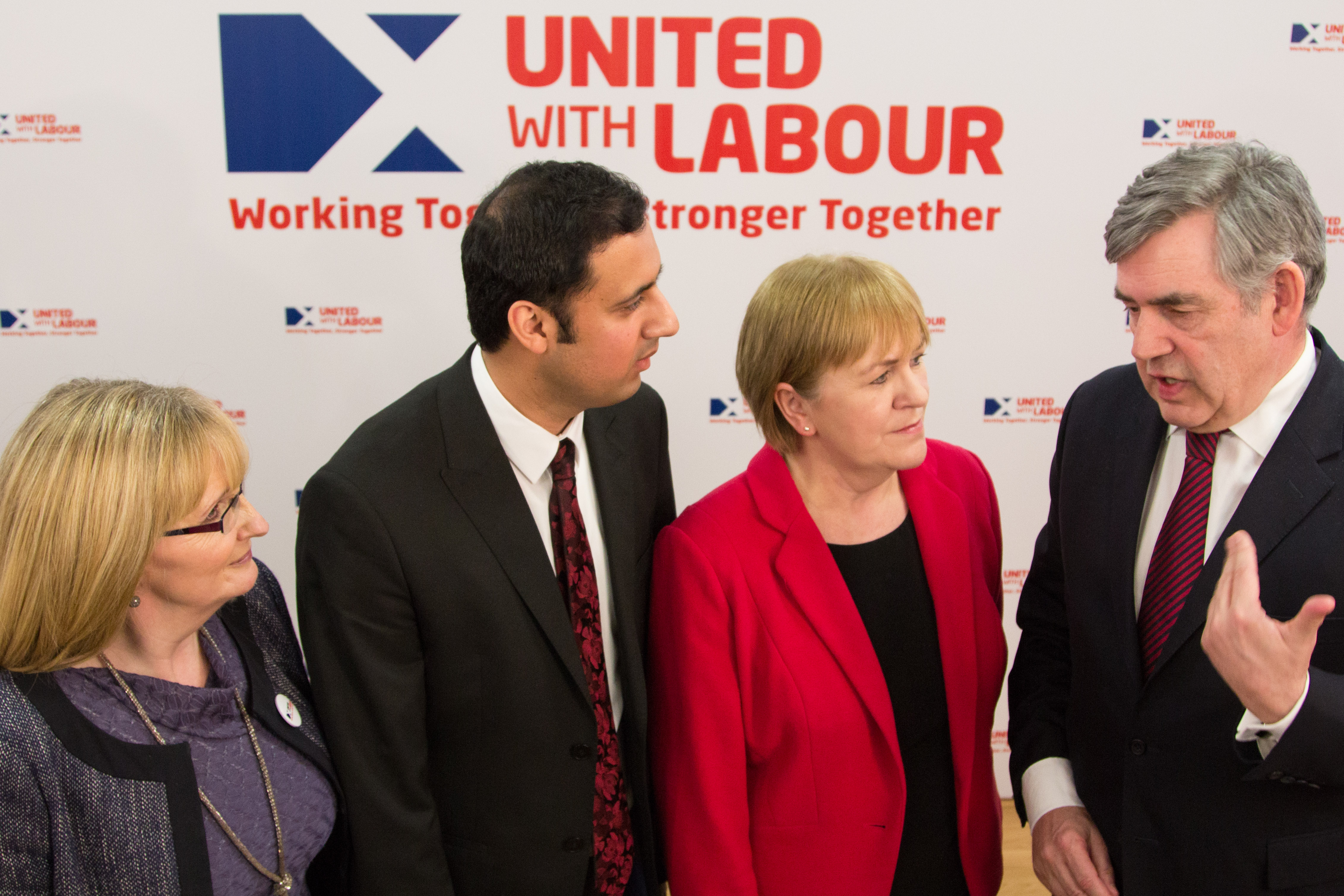
Lamont (second from right) alongside Anas Sarwar, Gordon Brown and Margaret Curran at the launch of United with Labour

Lamont was a prominent figure in the Better Together Campaign, the cross-party political movement founded to keep Scotland as part of the United Kingdom following the SNP's announcement of a referendum on Scottish independence in 2014. She was outspoken in her opposition to Scottish independence, using a keynote speech at UK Labour's 2013 conference in Brighton to accuse the SNP of nurturing hostility between Scotland and the rest of the UK, and describing nationalism as a "virus that has affected so many nations and done so much harm". Lamont is in favour of greater devolved powers for the Scottish Parliament, and established a Commission to look at how this can be achieved.

==== 2014 referendum and Better Together campaign ====
After taking office as Labour leader in December 2011, Lamont urged First Minister Salmond to set a date for the referendum, arguing in her leadership acceptance speech that uncertainty over the referendum's timeline was having a negative impact on Scotland. On 10 January 2012 Salmond announced late 2014 as his preferred time for a referendum. The Scottish Government confirmed the referendum question on 25 January 2012, and announced on 21 March 2013 that the referendum would be held on 18 September 2014. Lamont told Scottish Labour's 2012 annual conference she wanted her party's campaign to be one of "collective leadership" against independence, a strategy which she envisaged would become a cross-party movement arguing the case for keeping Scotland in the UK. At the Scottish Conservative Party conference a few weeks later, party leader Ruth Davidson called for Lamont and her opponents to work together. The Better Together Campaign, fronted by former chancellor of the exchequer Alistair Darling, was launched at an event attended by Lamont and other senior Scottish political figures at Edinburgh's Napier University on 25 June 2012. Along with former British prime minister Gordon Brown and other senior Scottish Labour figures, Lamont launched the party's own pro-union campaign, United with Labour in May 2013. The Scottish Government published Scotland's Future, a white paper setting out its vision for an independent Scotland, on 26 November 2013. Lamont dismissed it as "670 pages of assertion and uncertainty". Addressing the Shadow Cabinet of UK Labour leader Ed Miliband on 28 January 2014, Lamont warned that Scots could vote for independence if they believed Labour was unlikely to win the 2015 UK general election.

Opinion polls showed an increase in support for the Yes campaign as the referendum approached. On 8 September 2014, Gordon Brown set out plans for greater devolved powers for Holyrood in the event of a No vote. Lamont joined Ruth Davidson and Willie Rennie in giving her backing to the proposals the following day, but Salmond dismissed them as "a retreading, a repackaging, a re-timetabling" of previous promises. Prime Minister David Cameron and Opposition leader Ed Miliband cancelled their appearance at Prime Minister's Questions to travel to Scotland to campaign for a No vote. On 18 September, Scotland voted to reject independence with a majority of 2,001,926 to 1,617,989. Salmond announced his intention to resign as First Minister and SNP leader on 19 September, shortly after the result of the referendum was confirmed. Lamont paid tribute to him, describing him as "an immense figure in Scottish political history". Sturgeon was chosen to succeed Salmond as SNP leader on 15 October.

==== Labour's Commission on devolution ====
At the Scottish Labour Party Conference in March 2012, Lamont announced her intention to establish a Commission to examine the prospect of a fully devolved Scottish Parliament. This would give the Scottish Government the power to make decisions on policies relating to issues such as welfare benefits, income tax and corporation tax, effectively making it a fully self-governing region of the United Kingdom. The Commission, chaired by Lamont and including politicians, academics and trade union members, met for the first time in October 2012. It published an interim report in April 2013, recommending that Scotland have autonomy over income tax, but leaving decisions on corporation tax and welfare to the UK Parliament. But party members opposed it, warning that the plans could threaten the Barnett formula, the financial mechanism under which Scotland receives an annual average of £1,600 per head more in UK Government spending than does the rest of the UK. Ian Davidson, chair of the House of Commons Scottish Affairs Select Committee said the proposals could affect spending in poorer areas. Macintosh subsequently warned that devolving responsibility for income tax would reduce the Scottish tax base and result in independence by default, a claim that Guy Lodge and Alan Trench of the Institute for Public Policy Research called "highly disingenuous" because income tax makes up only 23% of the taxes collected by the UK Government.

The Commission's final report, Powers for a Purpose was published on 18 March 2014, setting out recommendations that would be implemented if Scotland voted no in the referendum, and Labour were elected in 2015. The proposals included allowing the Scottish Parliament to raise as much as 40% of its annual revenue, and giving it greater leeway to vary income tax rates from those in the rest of the UK. The plans would build on the powers devolved under the 2012 Scotland Act, which legislated for an increase in responsibility over taxation from 2016, in exchange for a 10% reduction in the grant received from Westminster. The Commission also recommended devolving responsibility in some other fiscal areas, such as the payment of Housing Benefit and the possible levy of a mansion tax in Scotland, but decided against taking charge of other financial matters, including state pensions, National Insurance and tariffs on North Sea oil. Other proposals were to retain the Barnett formula, give Scotland control over its railways, and transfer authority for dissolving parliament and holding elections from Westminster to Holyrood. Lamont described the proposals as "the right balance between fiscal accountability and insuring us against risk". Ben Thomson, chair of the cross-party Devo Plus think tank argued the plans were "just tinkering with the current system" and would allow the SNP to "say that the unionist parties aren't interested in real devolution". Deputy First Minister Sturgeon welcomed the prospect of increased devolution, but said a vote for independence was the only way to ensure greater powers for Scotland as "there [was] no guarantee that any new powers would be delivered in the event of a no vote". The proposals were subsequently endorsed by delegates at Scottish Labour's 2014 party conference.

=== Free public services debate ===
In September 2012, Lamont announced a policy review of Scotland's universal benefits, signalling that a future Labour administration would reverse many of the free services introduced since power was devolved to Scotland. Launching the review at an address to party delegates in Edinburgh, she questioned whether services such as prescriptions and tuition fees—which are free in Scotland—should continue to be available to all, regardless of income, and suggested the situation was unsustainable: "I believe our resources must go to those in greatest need ... Salmond's most cynical trick was to make people believe that more was free, when the poorest are paying for the tax breaks for the rich ... Scotland cannot be the only something-for-nothing country in the world."

The speech was condemned by the SNP, which branded it as "Blairite", while deputy party leader Sturgeon called the strategy "disastrous". The approach was also questioned by Richard Seymour of The Guardian, who suggested it could damage Labour's electoral appeal: "Outside Scotland, this policy would merely be a gift to the Tories, by corroborating their arguments for welfare cuts. In Scotland, it reminds ex-Labour voters why they defected to the SNP: as a defensive shield against such policies." Owen Jones of The Independent suggested it was "a baffling political strategy to outflank the SNP from the right".

Lamont returned to the issue of universal tuition fees again in a speech in Glasgow on 17 December 2012 to mark the first anniversary of her election as Labour leader. She suggested that the Graduate Endowment, a system abolished by the SNP Government, could be reinstated if Labour were re-elected at the next Scottish parliamentary election. Ian Grant, a retired college principal, welcomed her comments as "courageous", but Jamie Kinlochan, a member of the National Union of Students Scotland expressed concerns that students would be discouraged by extra financial costs on top of loans and other expenses.

In January 2014, Lamont and Scottish Labour faced criticism after the party voted against an SNP motion that included the introduction of free school meals for pupils in their first three years of primary education, and a commitment to childcare for pre-school children. The motion also contained measures that would only be implemented in the event of Scottish independence, something Labour said it could not support. Recalling her experience of teaching underprivileged children, Lamont told the parliament that free school meals would not be her priority, and tabled an unsuccessful amendment calling for greater childcare provisions instead. The motion was later passed by a majority of 67–46. In The Daily Telegraph, Cochrane wrote that the strategy had allowed the SNP to claim Labour opposed the principle of free school meals because they "fell for a bit of skulduggery that Ms Lamont and her business managers should have seen coming a mile off".

=== Falkirk candidate selection row and Grangemouth dispute ===
In 2013, Labour and Police Scotland launched separate investigations into claims that officials of the Unite union had signed their members up to Labour to get their preferred candidate adopted to represent the party in the Falkirk constituency. The union officials were later cleared of any wrongdoing. It was later claimed that key evidence thought to have been retracted had not been withdrawn, prompting several Falkirk councillors to urge Miliband to publish details of the party's internal inquiry or to hold a fresh investigation. On the 4 November edition of Good Morning Scotland, Lamont said there was a case for a fresh inquiry, but that Labour does not publish details of its internal investigations. Later the same day, Labour said that it would not be reopening the investigation. Miliband subsequently said that a new investigation was unnecessary. On 8 December the former MSP Karen Whitefield was selected to contest the seat. The report into Labour's inquiry was leaked to the media in February 2014, and concluded there was "no doubt" that Unite had attempted to manipulate the selection process.

In October 2013 Lamont faced criticism for her reaction to an industrial dispute at the Grangemouth Oil Refinery. Ineos, the company that operates the plant, had stated that the refinery was making financial losses, and had proposed a survival plan requiring employees to accept worse employment terms, notably changes in work rules and less generous pensions; this the employees rejected. The company mothballed the plant, threatening to close it if the terms were not accepted. Lamont urged Ineos to withdraw its conditions and for both sides to hold talks, while Salmond tried to negotiate an agreement. Union officials eventually agreed not to call a strike for at least three years, and the plant reopened. The Ineos chairman, Calum MacLean, described Lamont's support for the trade unions during the dispute as "deeply irresponsible", while Salmond claimed she had been silent throughout the disagreement. Writing for the Dunfermline Press, Natalie McGarry suggested that while the Labour leader's silence probably had much to do with the continuing Falkirk selection row, ultimately she was "found wanting".

=== Resignation ===
Scotland voted by a 10% margin against independence, but the referendum returned "Yes" votes in some traditional Labour strongholds, particularly Glasgow and North Lanarkshire, prompting media speculation about Lamont's future as the party's leader. Shortly after the referendum, Shadow International Development Secretary Jim Murphy was discussing taking over from her, while The Herald reported that party delegates concerned about the results had started to view Murphy as a possible successor. Lamont had attempted to quash rumours of a leadership challenge at the 25 September 2014 session of First Minister's Questions, the first of the post-referendum era. "When the First Minister is long gone I will still be doing my job on behalf of the people of Scotland." Her position remained uncertain. Alan Cochrane wrote that many Labour MPs in Scotland feared losing their seats at the 2015 general election without a change of leadership. In October, two former first ministers voiced their concern about the direction of the party. McConnell expressed fears that Labour would experience increased difficulty in regaining the confidence of Scottish voters following the election of Sturgeon as SNP leader, and described the party as "a political machine that is angry about what has happened in Scotland in the recent past". Shortly afterwards, his predecessor, Henry McLeish suggested Labour had ceded "enormous ground to the SNP unnecessarily" because its supporters no longer understood "what the party stands for". Margaret Curran, the Shadow Secretary of State for Scotland, said that although the party was changing, it needed to reconnect with its "socialist principles".

Lamont's resignation as Labour leader was reported by media outlets on the evening of 24 October 2014, following the publication of an interview with the Daily Record in which she announced her intention to step down with immediate effect. She told the newspaper that she was resigning because Labour's Westminster leadership had undermined her attempts to reform the party in Scotland, and treated Scottish Labour "like a branch office of London." She described some London-based colleagues as "dinosaurs" unable to understand that "Scotland has changed forever" following the referendum. Lamont was also angry that she had not been consulted on some matters, such as a decision by the UK leadership to replace Ian Price as Scottish Labour's general secretary. In her letter of resignation, submitted to Scottish Labour Party Chairman Jamie Glackin, Lamont accused "senior members of the party" of questioning her role and said that she was taking herself "out of the equation" to allow Scottish Labour to have a discussion about the best way forward. Anas Sarwar became Labour's acting leader. On 26 October, following a meeting of the party's executive committee, he outlined the details of a leadership election, which would be held using the three-tier electoral college, and conclude with the announcement of a new leader on 13 December. Murphy, Boyack and Neil Findlay stood in the subsequent contest, with Murphy elected as Lamont's successor. Lamont did not vote for Murphy in the election, but instead chose to back his rivals.

Miliband paid tribute to Lamont shortly after she announced that she intended to relinquish the leadership role, saying she had "led the Scottish Labour Party with determination". McLeish and McConnell both indicated that Lamont's sudden departure following weeks of speculation could have implications for Miliband's leadership. McLeish said that Miliband's chance of becoming prime minister could be affected if Labour returned fewer Scottish MPs in 2015, something he called a problem of "historic, epic proportions", while McConnell said that he was "very, very angry" and suggested Miliband had questions to answer about the circumstances surrounding the resignation. Salmond echoed the views of his predecessor, arguing that Miliband "should be answering questions about why Labour in Scotland is run as an extension of his Westminster office, and why he has effectively forced the resignation of a Labour leader in Scotland." Ed Balls, the Shadow Chancellor, rejected Lamont's claims about UK Labour's treatment of its Scottish counterpart. Ian Davidson claimed that supporters of Murphy, who subsequently announced his intention to stand in the leadership contest to succeed Lamont, had conducted a whispering campaign against her. He further suggested that those on the right of the party had resented her election as leader and ignored her, treating her as a "wee lassie".

== Post leadership ==
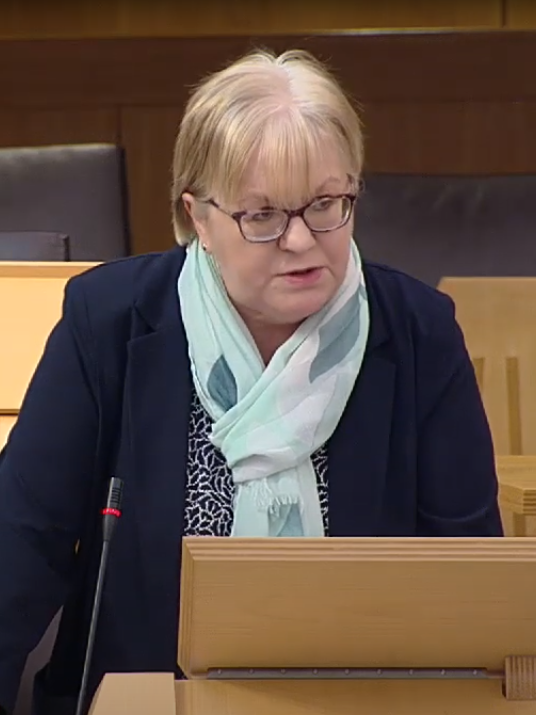
Lamont during General Questions at the Scottish Parliament in March 2020

Labour went on to suffer significant losses, both in the 2015 UK general election, and the 2016 Scottish Parliament election. In Glasgow, where the party had traditionally enjoyed strong support, both elections produced a result in which every Labour held constituency was lost to the SNP, while in 2016 the Conservatives overtook Labour as the second largest party at Holyrood. Lamont lost her Glasgow Pollok seat to the SNP's Humza Yousaf, who secured it with a majority of 6,484, but she was one of four Labour candidates elected to the Glasgow regional list, where she was joined by Sarwar, James Kelly and Pauline McNeill. In response to the results, Lamont suggested Labour needed to understand the reasons behind it, and suggested that the 2014 referendum could be partially responsible. "A bit of it, I think, is still the referendum, the Yes/No is the divide in people’s minds rather than the politics of taxation, investing in public services against a low tax economy and so on."

In November 2016, Lamont was announced as a member of the Commission on Parliamentary Reform, having been nominated to represent Scottish Labour.

In May 2018, Lamont was selected as Scottish Labour's prospective parliamentary candidate (PPC) for the Glasgow South UK Parliament constituency. In the 2017 general election, the constituency had been held by the SNP's Stewart McDonald with a majority of just 2,027. She contested the seat at the snap general election in December 2019 but was defeated by McDonald, whose majority increased to 9,005 over Labour.

Lamont nominated Anas Sarwar in the 2021 Scottish Labour leadership election. She subsequently stood down from Parliament at the 2021 election.

In 2022, Lamont was named as a founding member of the Board of Directors of Beira's Place, a Scotland-based private support service for female victims of sexual violence.

== Politics and views ==
Although she has been criticised by SNP politicians for taking a "Blairite" stance on public services, The Guardian's Peter Hetherington has described Lamont as "rooted to older [Labour] party values, with a deep commitment to fairness". Her politics were heavily influenced by her inner city upbringing and her career in teaching. Her childhood experience was something she addressed in an emotional speech to delegates at the 2013 Scottish Labour Party Conference: "I saw in my upbringing the beauty of our land and felt both the warmth of community and the harshness and brutality at times of trying to make a living here. I had the privilege to grow up in a family of love, but one where my mother always reminded me that what we ate, what we wore, where we lived, was all the product of the sweat of my father's brow earned at sea. And I respected that."

Lamont played a prominent role in the Better Together campaign that successfully persuaded Scots to vote to keep the Union in 2014. Speaking to the Labour party conference in 2013, she said: "The politics of identity is not the politics of justice. It wasn’t Scots, or the English or the Welsh or the Irish who fought for women’s votes, it was women and men who believed in justice... And I believe that Scotland is too big a country to hide behind Hadrian’s Wall and not play our part in fighting injustice in all its forms throughout these islands, and through partnership with our friends and neighbours across the world."

Throughout her career, Lamont has campaigned on issues such as equality and violence against women. Her profile on the Scottish Parliament website lists her political interests as being focussed on tackling poverty, women's rights and disability issues. She credits Curran, and the work of author Erin Pizzey for helping to broaden her understanding of women's issues. On 12 March 2014, she led a Scottish Parliament debate in which she discussed the increased opportunities available for women in Scotland, whilst highlighting issues she felt still needed to be addressed. At First Minister's Questions, she often highlighted personal stories of members of the public, believing them to bring an element of real life into the Parliament. Along with Holyrood's other opposition leaders, Lamont signed the Equality Network's Equal Marriage Pledge in favour of legalising same-sex marriage in January 2012, and voted in favour of the Marriage and Civil Partnership Bill on 4 February 2014. As someone with a Gaelic background, she has spoken of her belief in the importance of providing support for the language, feeling it has an economic benefit for Scotland. On the death of 95-year-old Nelson Mandela in December 2013, Lamont joined other public figures in paying tribute to him, describing the former South African President as "the towering figure of my life since I became politically aware".

Lamont has said that Labour lost the 2011 Scottish Parliament election because the party lost its direction, and that having failed to recognise the 2007 result as a defeat, it picked up the wrong signals from the 2010 general election that saw a strong Scottish Labour vote at Westminster. In February 2012, she told the Times Educational Supplement, "We misread the 2010 (general) election, thinking it was confirmation that Scotland was a Labour country – it was probably confirmation that Scotland was still anti-Tory. There's an issue about rebuilding trust, and our confidence in the values that brought us into politics." She told delegates at the 2012 Scottish Labour Party conference that it was time for them to stop apologising for past mistakes. "We know what happened last May – we looked tired and complacent and we got the kind of beating we deserved. But now, we need to start building the kind of Scottish Labour Party which Scotland deserves and which Scotland needs."

In an interview with Scotland on Sunday in September 2013, Lamont signalled her support for the creation of a land tax as part of reforms to local taxation, suggesting that the council tax freeze introduced by the SNP had resulted in a funding shortfall. At the 2014 Scottish Trades Union Congress annual conference, Lamont outlined plans to establish a Workers' Charter, saying she would work with the SNP government to achieve this.

Lamont is a signatory of the Labour Women’s Declaration, which originated amongst Labour members but is not affiliated with it. The declaration, which has been criticised as transphobic by some Labour members, opposes reform of the Gender Recognition Act which would allow transgender people to obtain a Gender Recognition Certificate on the basis of a statutory declaration, rather than the existing Gender Recognition Panel system. In the Scottish Parliament, the Labour Women’s Group, of which Lamont is a member, opposes protections for trans people being included in the Scottish Government’s Hate Crime bill, saying: "Cross-dressing is at best a fashion statement, and at worst the public enactment of a male fetish to wear women’s clothing, particularly lingerie. We do not think it should be protected in law."

== Media image ==
After her inaugural session of First Minister's Questions on 22 December 2011, the BBC's Brian Taylor called Lamont's performance "confident, direct and salient". Cochrane has suggested that she emerged as the prevailing force at the weekly debates with Salmond, writing in May 2013, "it's been obvious for some time to those of us in the cheap seats that Johann Lamont has more than got his measure." Peter Hetherington of The Guardian quotes an unnamed political observer at Holyrood who said, "She's getting under [Salmond's] skin like no predecessor." Writing for The Scotsman as Scottish Labour gathered for its conference in April 2013, Andrew Whitaker felt that Lamont's tenure as party leader had been successful, citing Labour's local election achievements and her weekly exchanges with Salmond at First Minister's Questions as examples: "Ms Lamont has made Labour at Holyrood respectable again and less of the laughing stock than the ravaged party that emerged from heavy defeat in 2011."

Her media appearances were criticised for their awkwardness. In September 2012, Richard Seymour of The Guardian described how she "fluffed her lines" during an interview with STV reporter Bernard Ponsonby following her announcement of Labour's public service policy review. Peter Ross of The Scotsman cites another interview, in which she was repeatedly questioned about her views on the UK Trident programme. But he describes her in person as "articulate, reflective, self-deprecating and at times very funny. It would be unfair to condemn her for not being a sound-bite politician; she ought to be applauded for it, but the trouble is we live in a sound-bite age." Mandy Rhodes of Holyrood magazine writes, "despite a reputation as being a bit of a fierce one, [Lamont] is actually, really rather entertaining, engaging and wonderfully self-deprecating." The BBC's Marianne Taylor describes Lamont as "Quietly spoken and more humorous in person than she comes across on television".

Ian Swanson of The Scotsman has described her as "dour but passionate". Lamont's low public recognition indicated by the December 2013 TNS BMRB poll led Herald columnist Alison Rowat to label her "the invisible woman of the independence debate", and to suggest she needed to raise her profile. Impressionist Jonathan Watson satirised Lamont in the 2013 edition of BBC Scotland's annual Hogmanay comedy show Only an Excuse?, featuring a sketch in which she debates Scottish independence with Salmond.

== Awards ==
Lamont's decision to question the status quo over the availability of free public services for all earned her the Political Impact of the Year award at the 2012 Herald Scottish Politician of the Year Awards. She was also nominated for Politician of the Year at the same ceremony, but beaten by Deputy First Minister Sturgeon. At the 2013 awards, she was the winner of the Donald Dewar Debater of the Year award for her weekly exchanges with Salmond at First Minister's Questions. In September 2021, after she had stood down from Parliament, she was named MSP of the Year at the 2021 Holyrood Garden Party and Political Awards for her campaigning for the rights of women and girls.

== Personal life ==
Lamont is married to Archie Graham, a member of Glasgow City Council as a Labour councillor for Langside ward. They have two children. Her nephew, Dòmhnall MacLaomainn, is a journalist with BBC Gàidhlig. She is a fan of the television soap Coronation Street and likes to keep fit by walking, jogging and dancing. As a keen runner, she has completed several long distance races.

== Notes ==
Scottish Parliament
New parliament Scotland Act 1998	Member of the Scottish Parliament for Glasgow Pollok; 1999–2016	Succeeded by Humza Yousaf
Party political offices
Preceded by Iain Gray	Leader of the Scottish Labour Party; 2011–2014	Succeeded by Jim Murphy
