= Neil Findlay =

Scottish Labour politician (born 1969)

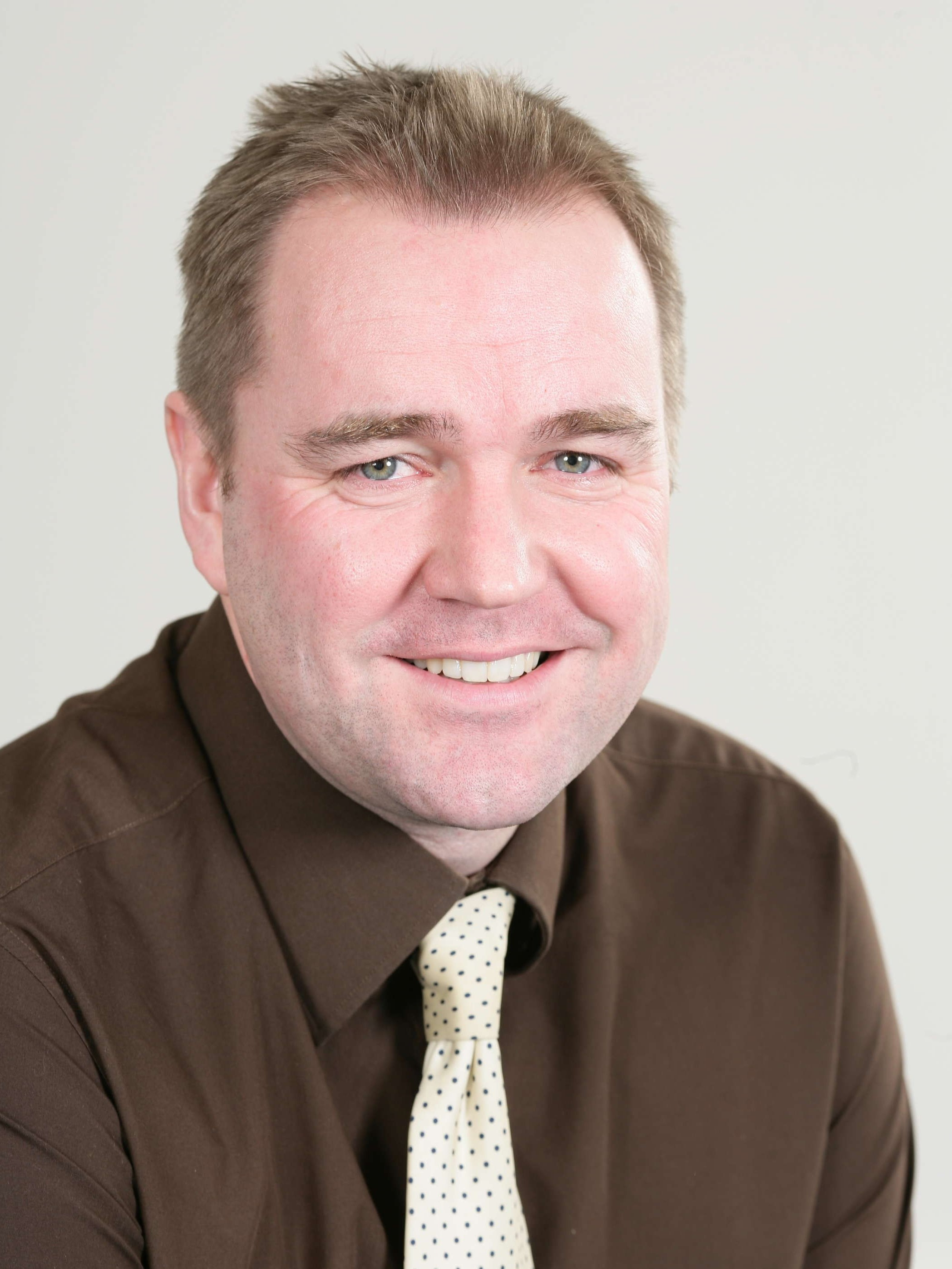
- Findlay in 2011

Convener of the Health and Sport Committee
- In office 12 May 2016 – 19 December 2017
- Preceded by: Duncan McNeil
- Succeeded by: Lewis Macdonald

Member of the Scottish Parliament for Lothian (1 of 7 Regional MSPs)
- In office 5 May 2011 – 5 May 2021

Scottish Labour portfolios
- 2013–2014: Shadow Cabinet Secretary for Health and Wellbeing
- 2014–2015: Shadow Cabinet Secretary for Fair Work, Skills and Training
- 2017–2019: Shadow Minister for Campaigns and Party Engagement
- 2017–2019: Shadow Cabinet Secretary for Brexit and Constitutional Relations
- 2018–2019: Shadow Minister for Parliamentary Business

Personal details
- Born: 6 March 1969 (age 57) Bangour General Hospital, West Lothian, Scotland
- Party: Independent
- Other political affiliations: Labour (until 2025); Campaign for Socialism; Red Paper Collective
- Spouse: Fiona Miller (m. 1998)
- Children: 1
- Education: University of Strathclyde; University of Glasgow
- Profession: Housing Officer, Teacher

Neil Findlay (born 6 March 1969) is a Scottish politician who was a Member of the Scottish Parliament (MSP) for Lothian from 2011 to 2021. Formerly a member of Scottish Labour, he resigned from the party in March 2025.

He was previously a councillor in West Lothian from 2003 to 2012.

== Early life and career ==
Findlay was born in 1969 in Bangour General Hospital, near Broxburn. He was raised in Blackburn, West Lothian and educated at the co-educational, Roman Catholic St Kentigern's Academy.

After leaving school in 1986, he became an apprentice bricklayer in his father's business, and spent ten years working there. During this time, he also studied at the University of Strathclyde, gaining a Bachelor of Arts in Geography and Politics, and going on to become a housing officer in 1996. After working for Almond Housing Association in Livingston for seven years, Findlay completed a PGCE at the University of Glasgow in 2003 and became a teacher in Falkirk for the next eight years.

Findlay describes himself as a socialist and trade unionist, and is on the left of the Labour Party, he's also has a committed Anti-Trident stance and is a member of the Campaign for Nuclear Disarmament and has been heavily critical in the past of his own party's position on Nuclear Weapons.

== Political career ==
In 2003, Findlay was elected onto West Lothian Council as a Scottish Labour councillor for the Fauldhouse and Breich Valley ward. He was re-elected in 2007 and stood down in 2012.

In 2011, Findlay was elected to the Scottish Parliament as one of seven additional members for Lothian list.

In 2012, he was appointed Shadow Minister for Skills and Learning. Leader Johann Lamont appointed him to the frontbench as Shadow Cabinet Secretary for Health and Wellbeing on 29 May 2013. He has also been a member of the Scottish Parliament's Performance Committee, Local Area Committee and the Services for the Community Policy Development and Scrutiny Panel.

Ahead of the 2014 Scottish independence referendum in 2014, Findlay campaigned for a No vote, advocating a "devomax" position, however unlike many of his colleagues within the Scottish Labour, he did not join the official Better Together movement and was a strong critic of his party's involvement due to it being a collaboration with the Conservatives. Instead, Findlay was part of the Red Paper Collective along with other members of the Scottish Labour Left and the Communist Party of Britain, which aimed to promote a left-wing, socialist vision for voting No on 18 September 2014.

On 29 October 2014, Findlay declared he would stand in the upcoming Scottish Labour leadership election. Initially, he wanted Gordon Brown to stand but Brown ruled himself out. Calling for a "clear red water" between Labour and the Scottish National Party, Findlay proposed raising the minimum wage, reintroducing council house building, reducing private sector use in the NHS and allowing councils to set taxes to help reverse job losses within their areas. The trade unions ASLEF, CWU, GMB, Musicians' Union, NUM, RMT, TSSA, UCATT, UNISON and Unite supported his candidature. He came second to Jim Murphy with 34.99% of the vote. In the aftermath of his leadership bid, Findlay was appointed Shadow Cabinet Secretary for Fair Work, Skills and Training on 16 December 2014 by Murphy and remained in the post until being reshuffled out by Murphy's successor, Kezia Dugdale in August 2015.

Findlay was the Scottish campaign chief for Jeremy Corbyn during the 2015 Labour leadership election, and is the convener of Scottish Labour's Campaign for Socialism, succeeding Elaine Smith. From 2016 until 2017, he served as convener of the Scottish Parliament's Health and Sport Committee. In 2017, he published his book Socialism and Hope: A journey through turbulent times, co-authored with biographer and journalist Jeff Holmes.

Findlay was appointed Scottish Labour's Brexit spokesperson by new leader Richard Leonard on 19 November 2017, and then also as Parliamentary Business Manager on 4 October 2018. In early May 2019, Edinburgh South MP Ian Murray accused him of "bullying and harassment" in a complaint to Scottish Labour's General Secretary Brian Roy. In turn, Findlay issued a counter-complaint over "derogatory" WhatsApp messages in which Murray accused the leadership of being "full of thugs and incompetents".

On 28 May 2019, the day after it was confirmed Scottish Labour had finished fifth in Scotland in the European election and lost both its MEPs, Findlay resigned as Brexit spokesperson and Business Manager. He also intimated he would leave the Scottish Parliament after the 2021 election. He indicated he had made this decision in March after months of thought and denied he was resigning due to the election result. He was however critical of "eternal internal fighting within our party and the toxic culture of leaks and briefings that come from some within the Scottish and UK parliamentary groups". Following his resignation, he argued Scottish Labour needed to adopt a "clear and easily understood position on the constitution", having previously argued in favour of a federal United Kingdom.

On 6 September 2019, a consultation launched by Findlay in the January reported there was overwhelming public support for his proposals for a bill to ban MSPs having second jobs, with some exceptions described as "common sense". In the October, former Scottish Conservative leader Ruth Davidson announced she was accepting a public relations role for lobbying firm Tulchan Communications while retaining her job as an MSP and Findlay used her appointment as further justification for his bill, arguing the rules which allowed her to do so were "not fit for purpose".

Along with Monica Lennon, Findlay abstained on an SNP government bill in favour of a second Scottish independence referendum. This was against their party's whip, which was to vote against the bill.

Findlay mocked Richard Leonard's critics in a September 2020 leaked email: "I support Richard 100% - the usual suspects think we just need to wind back to 1997 and then wave a union flag with gusto with Ian Murray and [deputy leader] Jackie Baillie leading and all will be well - delusion doesn't come close to it." He also described Leonard's critics in Labour's Scottish Parliament group in the Morning Star as "a kamikaze squad ... determined to destroy what remains of the party".

Findlay nominated Monica Lennon in the 2021 Scottish Labour leadership election.

Findlay resigned from the Labour Party in March 2025 in response to the government's changes to the benefits system. He later predicted that Anas Sarwar would lead Scottish Labour to its worst ever result at Holyrood.

== Personal life ==
Findlay is married to Fiona Miller, with whom he has one daughter, Chloe. He is a member of the trade unions Unite and Educational Institute of Scotland.
