= Jenny Marra =

Scottish politician (born 1977)

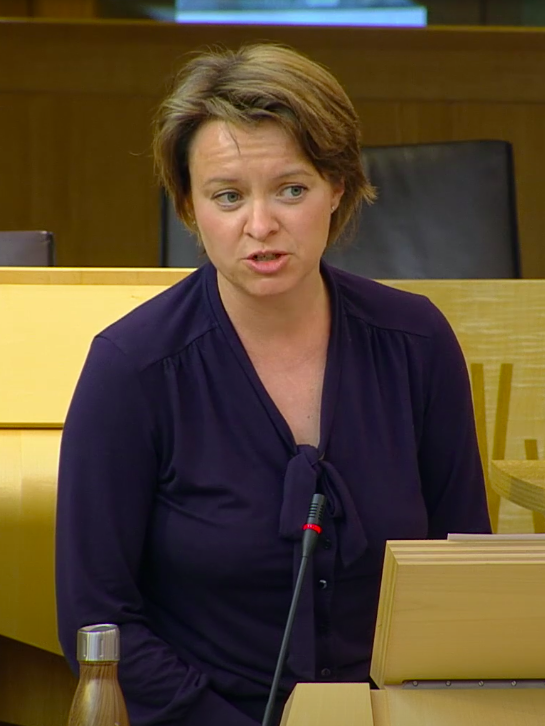
- Marra in 2019

Convener of the Public Audit Committee
- In office 29 September 2016 – 23 June 2021
- Preceded by: Hugh Henry
- Succeeded by: Richard Leonard

Member of the Scottish Parliament for North East Scotland (1 of 7 Regional MSPs)
- In office 5 May 2011 – 5 May 2021

Scottish Labour portfolios
- 2015–2016: Shadow Minister for Equalities

Personal details
- Born: Jennifer Margaret Marra; 6 November 1977 (age 48) Dundee, Scotland
- Party: Scottish Labour
- Spouse: John Thomson (m. 2016)
- Children: 2
- Education: University of St Andrews; Emory University; University of Dundee

Jennifer Margaret Marra (born 6 November 1977) is a Scottish politician who served as convener of the Public Audit Committee. A member of the Scottish Labour Party, she was a Member of the Scottish Parliament (MSP) for the North East Scotland region from 2011 to 2021.

== Early life and education ==
Marra was born on 6 November 1977 in Dundee to Eileen Margaret and Nicholas James Marra. She attended St John's High School in Dundee before going on to study history at the University of St Andrews, graduating in 1999 with an MA in modern history.

She then studied at Emory University in Atlanta, Georgia as a Robert T. Jones Scholar, after which she returned to her home town and spent five years promoting Dundee as a location for students, research and investment as Head of Press at the University of Dundee. In 2008, she graduated from the University of Glasgow with an LLB, and in 2009 received a graduate diploma in law from BPP University in London. In 2010, she graduated with a Diploma in Legal Practice from the University of Dundee.

== Political career ==
After a stint as the Labour MEPs spokesperson in Brussels and Strasbourg, Marra took a Scots law degree and qualified in both Scots and English law and Scottish legal practice. She is member of the GMB, Community and Amnesty International. She was Labour's Shadow Cabinet Secretary for Health, Wellbeing and Sport from 2014 until 2016. In addition to her party posts, Marra was also the Convenor for the Cross Party Group on Deafness.

In the 2014 Scottish Labour Party leadership election, Marra acted as co-chair of Jim Murphy’s campaign.

At the 2016 Scottish Parliament election, Marra stood for Dundee City West constituency and finished behind Joe Fitzpatrick, then she was returned to parliament as a list MSP. In the 5th Scottish Parliament, she served as convener of the Committee for Public Audit and Post-legislative Scrutiny.

Marra argued that the Labour Party should attempt to block Brexit in the House of Commons.

In November 2019, it was announced that Marra and Scottish National Party MSP Joan McAlpine would be hosting an event on behalf of the "Women's Human Rights Campaign", an international campaign that launched in New York in March 2019. The campaign's self-declared focus is on "the importance of keeping the current sex based definition of woman". The announcement was met with criticism from some feminist and LGBT groups, including Engender, The Equality Network and the Scottish Trans Alliance, who expressed their concerns that the Campaign's aims would breach Human Rights law, and in particular the rights of transgender people. However, a spokeswoman for the Campaign reiterated that their aim was to "re-affirm women’s sex-based rights, as set out in international human rights documents".

In September 2020, Marra became the first Labour MSP to call for Richard Leonard to quit as Scottish Labour leader. She said "If we do not change course now we risk catastrophe. The reality is that you only have a short window in political leadership to make an impression on the public. After three years the party’s standing is getting worse rather than better. No one can say that Richard has not had opportunities to turn the situation around. Richard’s leadership was tied from the start to the disaster of Jeremy Corbyn's project. It remains so in the public's view and they simply will not give the party a hearing as things stand."

On 28 November 2020, Marra announced that she would not stand in the 2021 Scottish Parliament election, stating "I have decided that my role as an MSP takes me away from my young children during the week in Edinburgh but also at evening meetings and weekend commitments".

Marra nominated Anas Sarwar in the 2021 Scottish Labour leadership election.

== Personal life ==
Marra is a niece of musician Michael Marra. Her brother is Michael Marra, who replaced his sister as Labour MSP for North East Scotland in 2021.

In May 2016, Marra married John Thomson of the newspaper group DC Thomson; they have two children.

Political offices
Preceded by Hugh Henry	Convener of the Public Audit Committee; 2016–2021	Succeeded by Richard Leonard
Party political offices
Preceded by Office established	Scottish Labour Spokesperson for Equalities; 2015–2016	Succeeded by Mary Fee
