= 2015 Labour Party leadership election =

2015 Labour Party leadership election may refer to:

- 2015 New South Wales Labor Party leadership election
- 2015 Scottish Labour leadership election
  - Endorsements in the 2015 Scottish Labour leadership election
- 2015 Labour Party leadership election (UK)
  - Endorsements in the 2015 Labour Party leadership election (UK)
  - 2015 Labour Party deputy leadership election
- 2015 Social Democratic and Labour Party leadership election

== See also ==
- 2014 Labour Party leadership election
- 2016 Labour Party leadership election
