= 2017 Labour Party leadership election =

Labour Party leadership elections were held in the following countries in 2017:

- 2017 Israeli Labor Party leadership election
- 2017 New Zealand Labour Party leadership election
- 2017 Scottish Labour Party leadership election

== See also ==
- 2016 Labour Party leadership election
- 2018 Labour Party leadership election
