= 2016 Labour Party leadership election =

2016 Labour Party leadership election may refer to:

- 2016 Labour Party leadership election (Ireland)
- 2016 Labour Party leadership election (UK)
  - Endorsements in the 2016 Labour Party leadership election (UK)
- 2016 ACT Labor Party leadership election in Australia
- 2016 Labour Party leadership election (Netherlands)

== See also ==
- 2015 Labour Party leadership election
- 2017 Labour Party leadership election
