= Cabinet Secretary for Public Service Reform =

Cabinet position in the Scottish Government

Scotland Cabinet Secretary for Public Service Reform
- Scottish Gaelic: Rùnaire a' Chaibineit airson Ath-leasachadh na Seirbheis Phoblaich

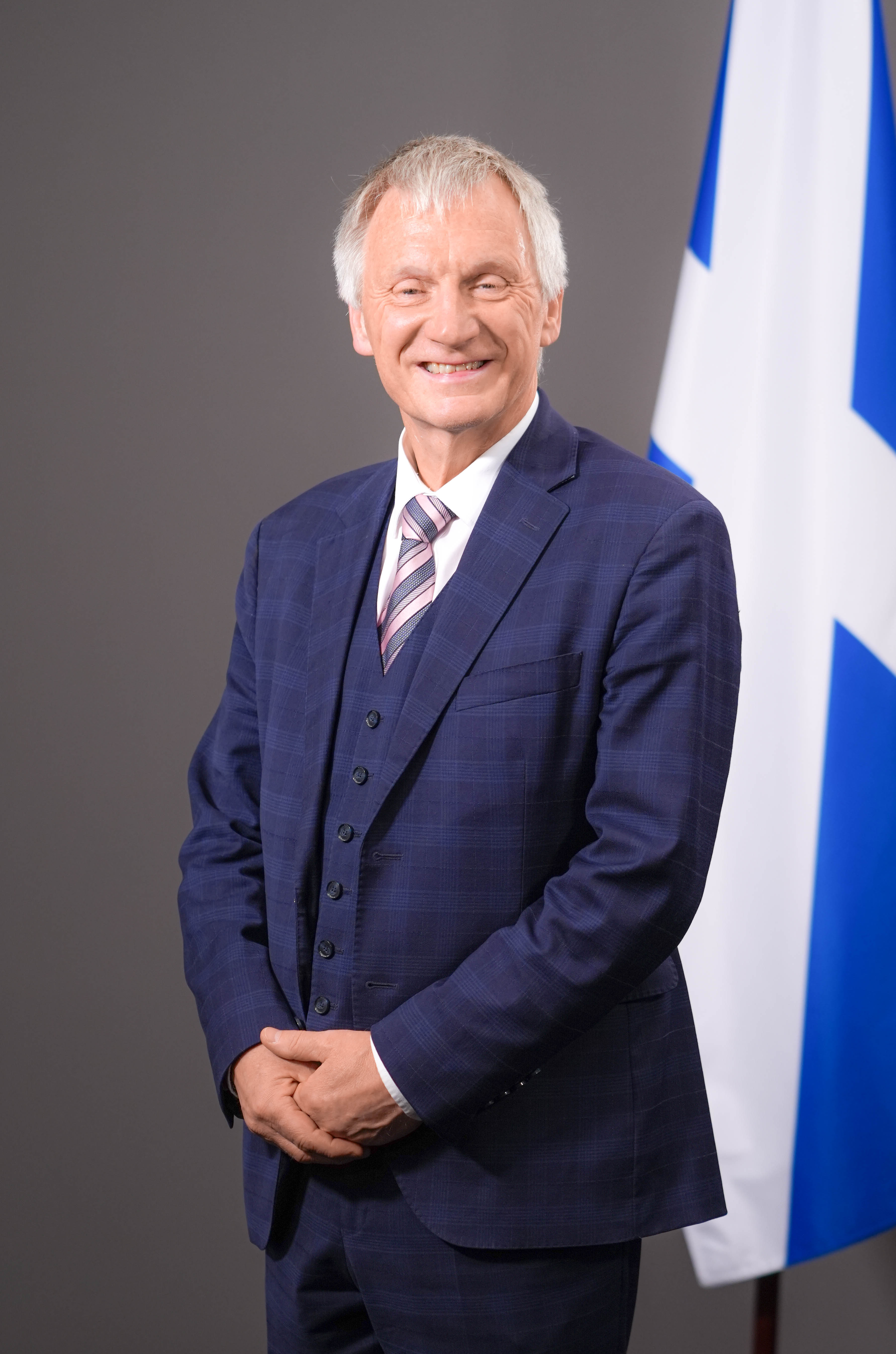
- Incumbent; Ivan McKee since 21 May 2026
- Scottish Government; Scottish Cabinet
- Style: Cabinet Secretary (within parliament); Public Service Reform Secretary (informal); Scottish Public Service Reform Secretary (outwith Scotland)
- Member of: Scottish Parliament; Scottish Cabinet
- Reports to: Scottish Parliament; First Minister
- Seat: Edinburgh
- Appointer: First Minister; (following approval from Scottish Parliament)
- Inaugural holder: Ivan McKee
- Formation: 21 May 2026
- Salary: £126,452 per annum (2024) (including £72,196 MSP salary)
- Website: www.gov.scot

The Cabinet Secretary for the Public Service Reform (Scottish Gaelic: Rùnaire a' Chaibineit airson Ath-leasachadh na Seirbheis Phoblaich), commonly referred to as the Public Service Reform Secretary (Scottish Gaelic: Rùnaire Ath-leasachadh na Seirbheis Poblach), is a cabinet position in the Scottish Government. The incumbent Cabinet Secretary for the Public Service Reform is Ivan McKee, who assumed office in May 2026.

The cabinet secretary is assisted by the Minister for Public Finance, who also supports the Cabinet Secretary for Finance and Local Government.

== History ==
The role is a new one, created at the formation of the Second Swinney government following the 2026 Scottish Parliament election.

== Responsibilities ==
The responsibilities of the Cabinet Secretary for Public Service Reform include:

- Public sector reform policy including civil service operations and efficiency
- Scottish Futures Trust
- Government procurement and shared services
- Public sector and public bodies productivity and efficiency
- Energy consents (including offshore consenting)
- National Performance Framework

== List of office holders ==
=== Cabinet position ===
Cabinet Secretary for Public Service Reform
Ivan McKee	21 May 2026	Incumbent	Scottish National Party	John Swinney

== See also ==
- Scottish Parliament
- Scottish Government
