= Des McNulty =

British politician (born 1952)

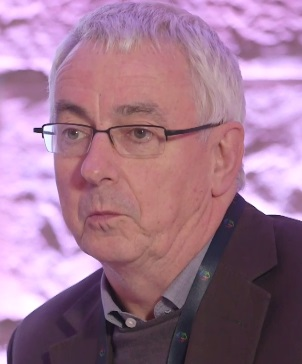
- McNulty in 2016

Member of the Scottish Parliament for Clydebank and Milngavie
- In office 6 May 1999 – 22 March 2011
- Preceded by: Constituency established
- Succeeded by: Gil Paterson

Personal details
- Born: Desmond McNulty; 28 July 1952 (age 74) Stockport, England
- Party: Scottish Labour Party
- Education: University of York

Desmond "Des" McNulty (born 28 July 1952), is a Scottish Labour Party politician, who served as the Member of the Scottish Parliament (MSP) for the Clydebank and Milngavie constituency from 1999 to 2011, serving as Labour's Shadow Cabinet Secretary for Education and Lifelong Learning until he was defeated at the 2011 election.

== Early life and career ==
McNulty studied at St Bede's College, Manchester and graduated from the University of York in social sciences in 1974.

Before entering the Scottish Parliament, he worked at Glasgow Caledonian University as a sociologist, later becoming head of strategic planning.

== Political career ==
McNulty served as Deputy Minister for Social Justice from 2002 to 2003, but was replaced after the 2003 election. He returned to ministerial office in November 2006 as Deputy Communities Minister.

On becoming leader of Labour in the Scottish Parliament in September 2008, Iain Gray appointed McNulty Shadow Minister for Transport, Infrastructure and Climate Change. McNulty also served on the Scottish Parliament Transport, Infrastructure and Climate Change Committee. On 27 October 2009 he was appointed Shadow Cabinet Secretary for Education and Lifelong Learning by Iain Gray.

== Personal life ==
McNulty is married and has two sons.

Scottish Parliament
New parliament Scotland Act 1998	Member of the Scottish Parliament for Clydebank and Milngavie; 1999–2011	Succeeded by Gil Paterson
Political offices
Preceded by Johann Lamont	Deputy Minister for Communities; 2006–2007	Office abolished
Preceded by Margaret Curran	Deputy Minister for Social Justice; 2002–2003	Office abolished
