= 2018 Labour Party leadership election =

Labour Party leadership elections were held in the following countries during 2018:

- 2018 Welsh Labour leadership election
- 2018 New South Wales Labor Party leadership election in Australia
- 2018 Welsh Labour deputy leadership election
- 2018 Scottish Labour deputy leadership election

== See also ==
- 2017 Labour Party leadership election
- 2019 Labour Party leadership election
