= Alan Cochrane =

- Born: Dundee, Scotland
- Education: Grove Academy
- Occupation: Journalist
- Employer: The Daily Telegraph

Alan Cochrane is the Scottish editor of the British broadsheet newspaper The Daily Telegraph.

== Life and career ==
Cochrane was born in Dundee and educated at the city's Grove Academy. He joined DC Thomson as a sub-editor and reporter before moving to the Scottish Daily Express. Between the mid-1970s and the mid-1990s he was based in London, covering political issues for several newspapers.

In 1994 he became editor of the Scottish Daily Express, then deputy editor of Scotland on Sunday. In the late 1990s he became a columnist at The Daily Telegraph before becoming its Scottish editor.
