= Mid Scotland and Fife (Scottish Parliament electoral region) =

- electoral region for the Scottish Parliament
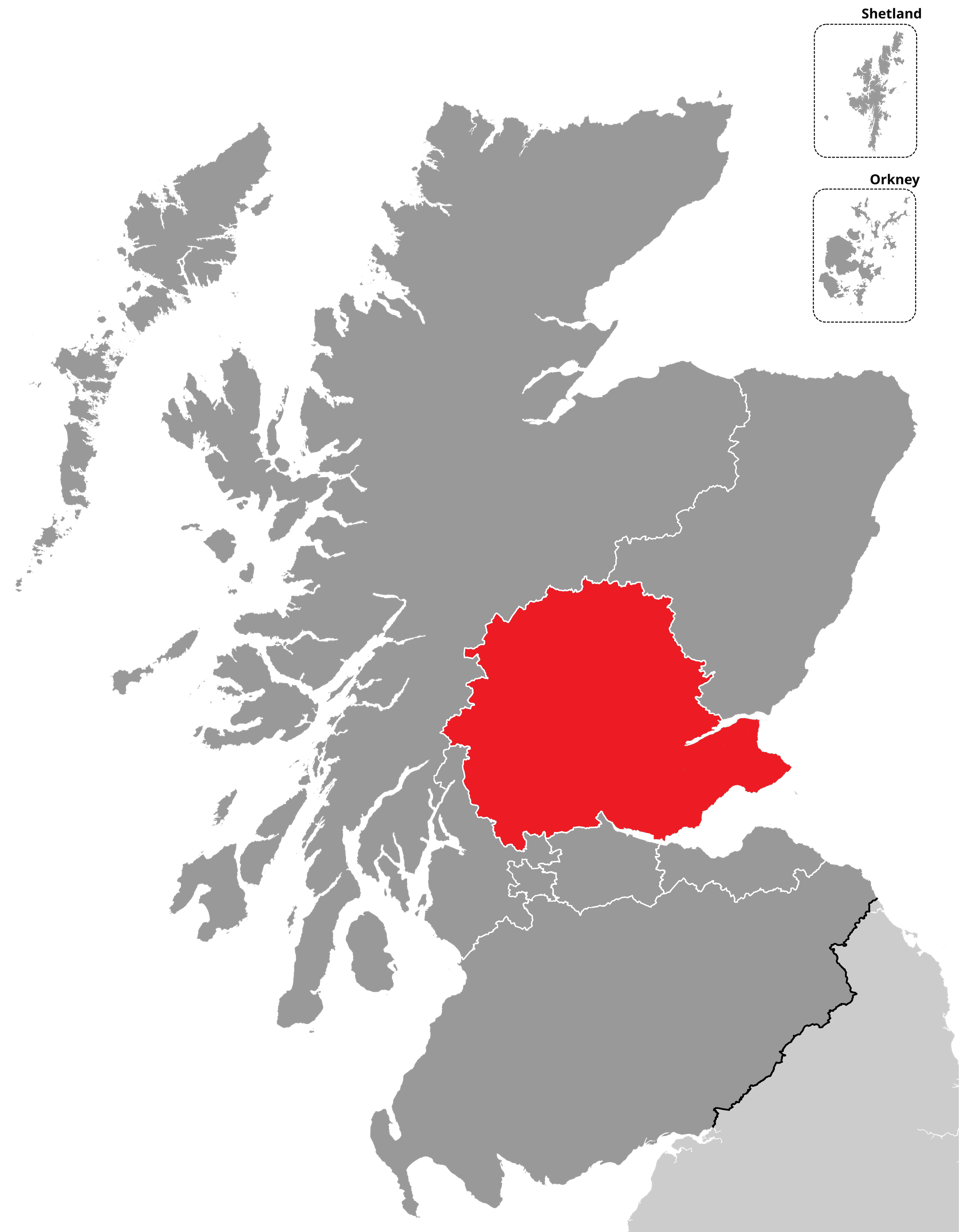
- Mid Scotland and Fife shown within Scotland
- Electorate: 521,460 (2022)

Current electoral region
- Created: 1999
- MSPs: Scottish National Party 8 Reform UK 2 Conservative 2 Labour 2 Liberal Democrats 1 Scottish Greens 1
- Council areas: Clackmannanshire; Fife; Perth and Kinross; Stirling
- Constituencies: Clackmannanshire and Dunblane; Cowdenbeath; Dunfermline; Fife North East; Kirkcaldy; Mid Fife and Glenrothes; Perthshire North; Perthshire South and Kinross-shire; Stirling

Mid Scotland and Fife is one of the eight electoral regions of the Scottish Parliament which were created in 1999. Nine of the parliament's 73 first past the post constituencies are sub-divisions of the region and it elects seven of the 56 additional-member Members of the Scottish Parliament (MSPs). Thus it elects a total of 16 MSPs.

The Mid Scotland and Fife region shares boundaries with the Central Scotland and Lothians West, Highlands and Islands, North East Scotland and West Scotland regions, and is connected with the Edinburgh and Lothians East region by bridges across the Firth of Forth.

== Constituencies and council areas ==
=== 2026–present ===
Following the Second Periodic Review of Scottish Parliament Boundaries, boundaries for Scotland's electoral regions and constituencies were redrawn ahead the 2026 Scottish Parliament election. Mid Scotland and Fife was however left unchanged as result of this review.

Region	Constituencies from 2026
	1. Clackmannanshire and Dunblane; 2. Cowdenbeath; 3. Dunfermline; 4. Fife North East; 5. Kirkcaldy; 6. Mid Fife and Glenrothes; 7. Perthshire North; 8. Perthshire South and Kinross-shire; 9. Stirling

=== 2011–2026 ===
Map of boundaries from 2011

As a result of the First Periodic Review of Scottish Parliament Boundaries the boundaries for the region and constituencies were redrawn for the 2011 Scottish Parliament election.

Map	Constituency
	1. Clackmannanshire and Dunblane; 2. Cowdenbeath; 3. Dunfermline; 4. Kirkcaldy; 5. Mid Fife and Glenrothes; 6. North East Fife; 7. Perthshire North; 8. Perthshire South and Kinross-shire; 9. Stirling

=== 1999–2011 ===
The constituencies were created in 1999 with the names and boundaries of Westminster constituencies, as existing in at that time. The Holyrood constituencies cover all of three council areas, the Clackmannanshire council area, the Fife council area and the Stirling council area, most of the Perth and Kinross council area and part of the Angus council area.

The rest of the Angus council area is within the North East Scotland electoral region.

Map	Constituency
	1. Dunfermline East covers a south-western portion of the Fife council area.; 2. Dunfermline West covers a south-western area of the Fife council area, west of Dunfermline East.; 3. Fife Central covers a central portion of the Fife council area.; 4. Fife North East covers a north-eastern portion of the Fife council area.; 5. Kirkcaldy covers a southern portion of the Fife council area.; 6. North Tayside covers a northern portion of the Perth and Kinross council area, and a northern portion of the Angus council area.; 7. Ochil covers the Clackmannanshire council area, a south-eastern portion of the Perth and Kinross council area, and a south-eastern portion of the Stirling council area.; 8. Perth covers a central portion of the Perth and Kinross council area.; 9. Stirling covers most of the Stirling council area.

== Members of the Scottish Parliament ==
=== Constituency MSPs ===
Term	Election	Dunfermline East	Dunfermline West	Ochil	Fife Central	Kirkcaldy	Fife North East	North Tayside	Perth	Stirling
1st	1999	Helen Eadie (Labour)	Scott Barrie (Labour)	Richard Simpson (Labour)	Henry McLeish (Labour)	Marilyn Livingstone (Labour)	Iain Smith (LD)	John Swinney (SNP)	Roseanna Cunningham (SNP)	Sylvia Jackson (Labour)
2nd	2003	Helen Eadie (Labour)	Scott Barrie (Labour)	George Reid (SNP)	Christine May (SNP)	Marilyn Livingstone (Labour)	Iain Smith (LD)	John Swinney (SNP)	Roseanna Cunningham (SNP)	Sylvia Jackson (Labour)
3rd	2007	Helen Eadie (Labour)	Jim Tolson (Lib Dem)	Keith Brown (SNP)	Tricia Marwick (SNP)	Marilyn Livingstone (Labour)	Iain Smith (LD)	John Swinney (SNP)	Roseanna Cunningham (SNP)	Bruce Crawford (SNP)
Term	Election	Cowdenbeath	Dunfermline	Clackmannanshire and Dunblane	Mid Fife and Glenrothes	Kirkcaldy	Fife North East	Perthshire North	Perthshire South and Kinross-shire	Stirling
4th	2011	Helen Eadie (Labour)	Bill Walker (SNP) (later Independent)	Keith Brown (SNP)	Tricia Marwick (SNP)	David Torrance (SNP)	Roderick Campbell (SNP)	John Swinney (SNP)	Roseanna Cunningham (SNP)	Bruce Crawford (SNP)
4th	2013 by	Helen Eadie (Labour)	Cara Hilton (Labour)	Keith Brown (SNP)	Tricia Marwick (SNP)	David Torrance (SNP)	Roderick Campbell (SNP)	John Swinney (SNP)	Roseanna Cunningham (SNP)	Bruce Crawford (SNP)
4th	2014 by	Alex Rowley (Labour)	Cara Hilton (Labour)	Keith Brown (SNP)	Tricia Marwick (SNP)	David Torrance (SNP)	Roderick Campbell (SNP)	John Swinney (SNP)	Roseanna Cunningham (SNP)	Bruce Crawford (SNP)
5th	2016	Annabelle Ewing (SNP)	Shirley-Anne Somerville (SNP)	Keith Brown (SNP)	Jenny Gilruth (SNP)	David Torrance (SNP)	Willie Rennie (Lib Dem)	John Swinney (SNP)	Roseanna Cunningham (SNP)	Bruce Crawford (SNP)
6th	2021	Annabelle Ewing (SNP)	Shirley-Anne Somerville (SNP)	Keith Brown (SNP)	Jenny Gilruth (SNP)	David Torrance (SNP)	Willie Rennie (Lib Dem)	John Swinney (SNP)	Jim Fairlie (SNP)	Evelyn Tweed (SNP)
7th	2026	David Barratt (SNP)	Shirley-Anne Somerville (SNP)	Keith Brown (SNP)	Jenny Gilruth (SNP)	David Torrance (SNP)	Willie Rennie (Lib Dem)	John Swinney (SNP)	Jim Fairlie (SNP)	Alyn Smith (SNP)

=== Regional List MSPs ===
N.B. This table is for presentation purposes only

Term	Election (Replacement date)	MSP	MSP	MSP	MSP	MSP	MSP	MSP
1st	1999–2003	Bruce Crawford (SNP)	Tricia Marwick (SNP)	George Reid (SNP)	Keith; Raffan (Lib Dem)	Keith; Harding (Conservative)	Nick Johnston (Conservative)	Brian Monteith (Conservative)
1st	2001	Bruce Crawford (SNP)	Tricia Marwick (SNP)	George Reid (SNP)	Keith; Raffan (Lib Dem)	Keith; Harding (Conservative)	Murdo Fraser (Conservative)	Brian Monteith (Conservative)
2nd	2003–07	Bruce Crawford (SNP)	Tricia Marwick (SNP)	Mark Ruskell (Green)	Keith; Raffan (Lib Dem)	Ted Brocklebank (Conservative)	Murdo Fraser (Conservative)	Brian Monteith (Conservative)
2nd	2005	Bruce Crawford (SNP)	Tricia Marwick (SNP)	Mark Ruskell (Green)	Andrew Arbuckle (Lib Dem)	Ted Brocklebank (Conservative)	Murdo Fraser (Conservative)	Brian Monteith (Conservative)
3rd	2007–11	Chris Harvie (SNP)	John Park (Labour)	Claire Brennan-Baker (Labour)	Richard Simpson (Labour)	Ted Brocklebank (Conservative)	Murdo Fraser (Conservative)	Liz Smith (Conservative)
4th	2011–16	Annabelle Ewing (SNP)	John Park (Labour)	Claire Brennan-Baker (Labour)	Richard Simpson (Labour)	Willie Rennie (Lib Dem)	Murdo Fraser (Conservative)	Liz Smith (Conservative)
4th	2011–16	Annabelle Ewing (SNP)	Jayne Baxter (Labour)	Claire Brennan-Baker (Labour)	Richard Simpson (Labour)	Willie Rennie (Lib Dem)	Murdo Fraser (Conservative)	Liz Smith (Conservative)
5th	2016–21	Mark Ruskell (Green)	Alex Rowley (Labour)	Claire Brennan-Baker (Labour)	Dean Lockhart (Conservative)	Alexander Stewart (Conservative)	Murdo Fraser (Conservative)	Liz Smith (Conservative)
6th	2021–2026	Mark Ruskell (Green)	Alex Rowley (Labour)	Claire Brennan-Baker (Labour)	Dean Lockhart (Conservative)	Alexander Stewart (Conservative)	Murdo Fraser (Conservative)	Liz Smith (Conservative)
6th	2022	Mark Ruskell (Green)	Alex Rowley (Labour)	Claire Brennan-Baker (Labour)	Roz McCall (Conservative)	Alexander Stewart (Conservative)	Murdo Fraser (Conservative)	Liz Smith (Conservative)
7th	2026–	Mark Ruskell (Green)	Joe Long (Labour)	Claire Brennan-Baker (Labour)	Helen McDade (Reform)	Julie MacDougall (Reform)	Murdo Fraser (Conservative)	Stephen Kerr (Conservative)

== Election results ==
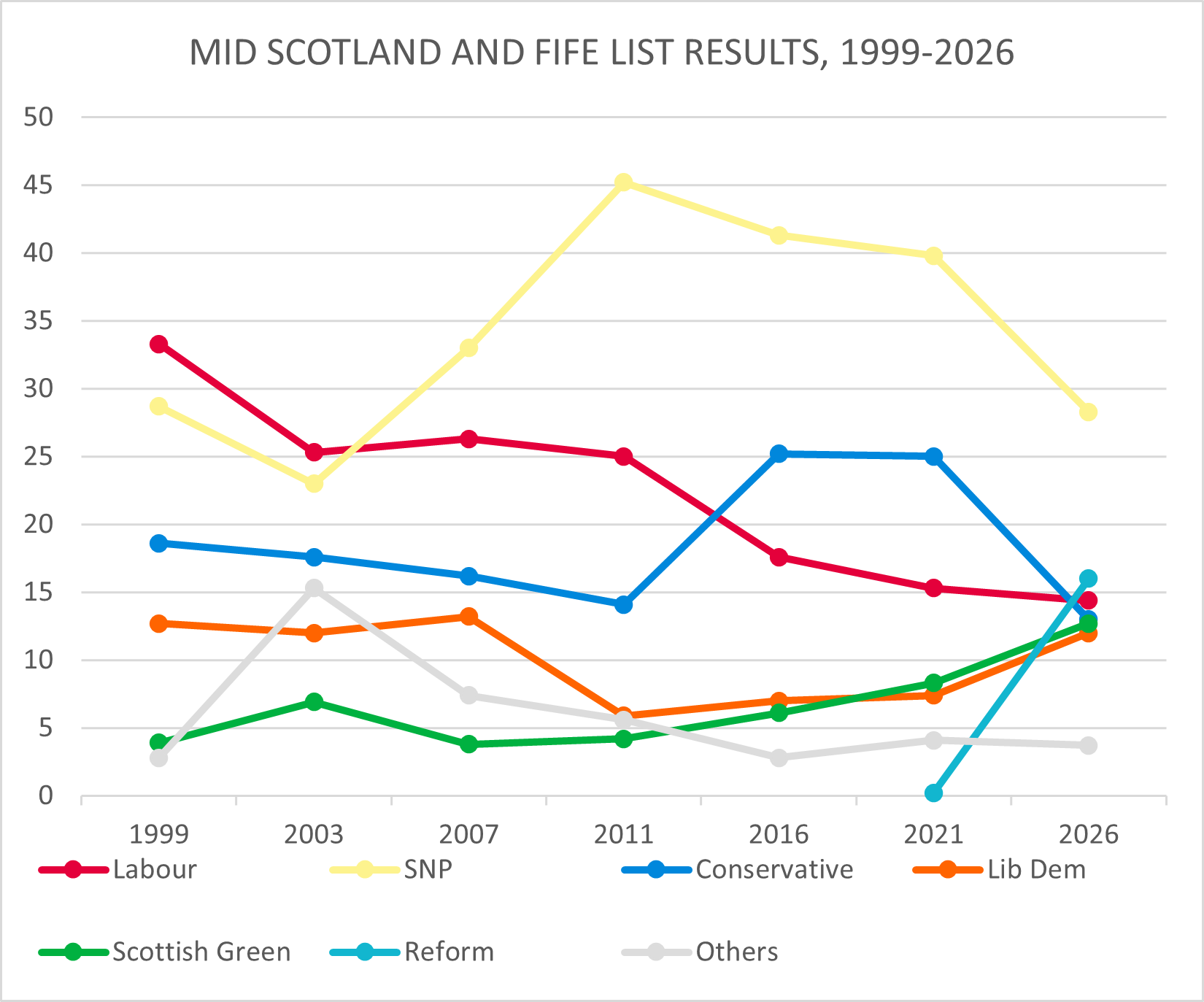
Election results since 1999 (parties who never got >5% counted as others)

=== 2026 Scottish Parliament election ===
==== Constituency results ====
2026 Scottish Parliament election: Mid Scotland and Fife
Constituency	Elected member	Result
Clackmannanshire and Dunblane	Keith Brown	SNP hold
Cowdenbeath	David Barratt	SNP hold
Dunfermline	Shirley-Anne Somerville	SNP hold
Kirkcaldy	David Torrance	SNP hold
Mid Fife and Glenrothes	Jenny Gilruth	SNP hold
North East Fife	Willie Rennie	Liberal Democrats hold
Perthshire North	John Swinney	SNP hold
Perthshire South and Kinross-shire	Jim Fairlie	SNP hold
Stirling	Alyn Smith	SNP hold

==== Additional member results ====
2026 Scottish Parliament election: Mid Scotland and Fife
List	Candidates	Votes	Of total (%)	± from prev.
SNP	John Swinney, Shirley-Anne Somerville, Fiona Law, Alyn Smith, Jim Fairlie, David Torrance, Susan McGill, John Beare, David Mitchell	81,018	28.3	▼12.3
Reform	Helen McDade, Julie MacDougall, Rachael Wright, Mark Davies, Mike Collier, Kenneth Morton, Otto Inglis	45,632	16.0	▲15.7
Labour	Claire Baker, Joe Long, Fiona Sword, Kainde Manji, Suzanne Grahame, Angela Bailey, Elizabeth Carr-Ellis, Afifa Khanam, Luke William Thomson	41,056	14.4	▼0.9
Conservative	Murdo Fraser, Stephen Kerr, Roz McCall, Alexander Stewart, Edward Sheasby, Thomas Heald, Darren Watt, Heather Greig, Niamh Heald	37,155	13.0	▼12.0
Green	Mark Ruskell, Mags Hall, Caitlin Ripley, Ryan Blackadder, Marie Stadtler, Clare Andrews, Andrew Adam, Paul Vallot	36,286	12.7	▲4.4
Liberal Democrats	Claire McLaren, Sally Pattle, Edward Scotcher, Amanda Clark, Lauren Buchanan-Quigley, Jane Ann Liston, Fraser Graham	34,363	12.0	▲4.6
AtLS	Eva Comrie, Laurie Moffat, John Penman, Donal Hurley, Frank Armstrong	2,802	1.0	▲1.0
Independent Green Voice	Alexandra Hardie	2,490	0.9	▲0.9
Scottish Family	Richard Lucas, Daniel Smith, Alan Brown, Marc Surtees	1,780	0.6	▲0.6
ISP	John Forbes	1,732	0.6	▲0.6
Scottish Socialist	Jack Reekie, Paolo Caserta	828	0.3	▲0.3
Advance UK	Hilary Wheater, Reece Lauder	467	0.2	▲0.2
Scottish Libertarian	Calum Paul	409	0.1	▼0.1

=== 2021 Scottish Parliament election ===
==== Constituency results ====
2021 Scottish Parliament election: Mid Scotland and Fife
Constituency	Elected member	Result
Clackmannanshire and Dunblane	Keith Brown	SNP hold
Cowdenbeath	Annabelle Ewing	SNP hold
Dunfermline	Shirley-Anne Somerville	SNP hold
Kirkcaldy	David Torrance	SNP hold
Mid Fife and Glenrothes	Jenny Gilruth	SNP hold
North East Fife	Willie Rennie	Liberal Democrats hold
Perthshire North	John Swinney	SNP hold
Perthshire South and Kinross-shire	Jim Fairlie	SNP hold
Stirling	Evelyn Tweed	SNP hold

==== Additional member results ====
2021 Scottish Parliament election: Mid Scotland and Fife
List	Candidates	Votes	Of total (%)	± from prev.
SNP	Stefan Hoggan-Radu, John Swinney, Keith Brown, Annabelle Ewing, Jim Fairlie, David Torrance, Ross Cunningham, Fiona Sarwar, Moraig Henderson, Lee Robb, Rosemary Hunter	136,825	39.8	▼1.5
Conservative	Murdo Fraser, Liz Smith, Dean Lockhart, Alexander Stewart, Roz McCall, Angus Forbes, Rhona Metcalfe, Darren Watt, Moira Benny, Kathleen Leslie, David MacPhee	85,909	25.0	▼0.2
Labour	Claire Baker, Alex Rowley, Julie MacDougall, Craig Miller, Chris Kane, Ryan Smart, Ewan Dillon	52,626	15.3	▼2.3
Green	Mark Ruskell, Mags Hall, Marion Robertson, Fiona McOwan, Scott Rutherford, Jeroen van Leeuwen, Elspeth MacLachlan, Paul Vallot, Amy Smith, Craig McCutcheon	28,654	8.3	▲2.2
Liberal Democrats	Willie Rennie, Peter Barrett, Aude Boubaker-Calder, Julia Brown, Jane Liston, Fayzan Rehman, Aisha Mir	25,489	7.4	▲0.4
Alba	Eva Comrie, Neale Hanvey, Jim Eadie, Stephanie Reilly	5,893	1.7	▲1.7
All for Unity	Linda Holt, Imam Khan, Brian Henderson, Ian Stewart, James Glen, Graham Dawson, Michael Saint	2,578	0.7	▲0.7
Scottish Family	Donald Marshall, Stephen Saunders, Davina Saunders, Anil Alexander, George Carratt, Linda Mair, Paul Lynch	1,920	0.6	▲0.6
Abolish the Scottish Parliament	Ian Mann, John Duff	945	0.3	▲0.3
Freedom Alliance	Lisa Brackenridge, Eren Sinclair, Stuart Cairns, Kathleen Elliott	837	0.2	▲0.2
Scottish Libertarian	Calum Paul, George Morton	818	0.2	0.0
Reform	Kenneth Morton, Victoria McCann, Otto Inglis, Alexander Black, Guy Addison, Karen Morton	808	0.2	▲0.2
UKIP	Lynda Davis, Douglas Watters, George Cormack, Edward McNally	399	0.1	▼1.7
Independent	Martin James Keatings	230	0.1	▲0.1
Renew	Bruce Henderson, Stefan Diesing	99	0.0	0.0
Independent	Mercy Mugure Kamanja	29	0.0	0.0

=== 2016 Scottish Parliament election ===
In the 2016 Scottish Parliament election the region elected MSPs as follows:

- 8 Scottish National Party MSPs (all constituency members)
- 4 Conservative MSP (all additional members)
- 2 Labour MSPs (all additional members)
- 1 Liberal Democrat MSP (constituency member)
- 1 Scottish Greens MSP (additional member)

==== Constituency results ====
2016 Scottish Parliament election: Mid Scotland and Fife
Constituency	Elected member	Result
Clackmannanshire and Dunblane	Keith Brown	SNP hold
Cowdenbeath	Annabelle Ewing	SNP gain from Labour
Dunfermline	Shirley-Anne Somerville	SNP hold
Kirkcaldy	David Torrance	SNP hold
Mid Fife and Glenrothes	Jenny Gilruth	SNP hold
North East Fife	Willie Rennie	Liberal Democrats gain from SNP
Perthshire North	John Swinney	SNP hold
Perthshire South and Kinross-shire	Roseanna Cunningham	SNP hold
Stirling	Bruce Crawford	SNP hold

==== Additional member results ====
2016 Scottish Parliament election: Mid Scotland and Fife
Party	Elected candidates	Seats	+/−	Votes	%	+/−%
SNP		0	-1	120,128	41.3	-3.9
Conservative	Murdo Fraser; Liz Smith; Alexander Stewart; Dean Lockhart	4	+2	73,293	25.2	+11.0
Labour	Claire Brennan-Baker; Alex Rowley	2	-1	51,373	17.6	-7.4
Liberal Democrats		0	-1	20,401	7.0	+1.2
Green	Mark Ruskell	1	+1	17,860	6.1	+1.9
UKIP		0	0	5,345	1.8	+0.7
RISE		0	0	1,073	0.4	N/A
Solidarity		0	0	1,049	0.4	+0.3
Scottish Libertarian		0	0	650	0.2	N/A

=== 2011 Scottish Parliament election ===
In the 2011 Scottish Parliament election the region elected MSPs as follows:

- 9 Scottish National Party MSPs (eight constituency members and one additional members)
- 4 Labour MSPs (one constituency members and three additional members)
- 2 Conservative MSP (both additional members)
- 1 Liberal Democrat MSPs (additional member)

==== Constituency results ====
2011 Scottish Parliament election: Mid Scotland and Fife
Constituency	Elected member	Result
Clackmannanshire and Dunblane	Keith Brown	SNP hold
Cowdenbeath	Helen Eadie	Labour hold
Dunfermline	Bill Walker	SNP gain from Liberal Democrats
Kirkcaldy	David Torrance	SNP gain from Labour
Mid Fife and Glenrothes	Tricia Marwick	SNP hold
North East Fife	Roderick Campbell	SNP gain from Liberal Democrats
Perthshire North	John Swinney	SNP hold
Perthshire South and Kinross-shire	Roseanna Cunningham	SNP hold
Stirling	Bruce Crawford	SNP gain from Labour

==== Additional member results ====
2011 Scottish Parliament election: Mid Scotland and Fife
Party	Elected candidates	Seats	+/−	Votes	%	+/−%
SNP	Annabelle Ewing	1	±0	116,691	45.2	+12.7
Labour	John Park; Claire Brennan-Baker; Richard Simpson	3	0	64,623	25.0	-2.1
Conservative	Murdo Fraser; Liz Smith	2	-1	36,458	14.1	-1.5
Liberal Democrats	Willie Rennie	1	+1	15,103	5.9	-7.7
Green		0	0	10,914	4.2	+0.5
All Scotland Pensioners Party		0	0	4,113	1.6	-0.4
UKIP		0	0	2,838	1.1	+0.5
Socialist Labour		0	0	1,771	0.7	+0.1
BNP		0	0	1,726	0.7	-0.3
Independent		0	0	1,446	0.6	N/A
Scottish Socialist		0	0	834	0.3	-0.1
Scottish Christian		0	0	786	0.3	-0.3
CPA		0	0	638	0.2	0.0
Solidarity		0	0	202	0.1	-0.8

=== 2007 Scottish Parliament election ===
In the 2007 Scottish Parliament election the region elected MSPs as follows:

- 6 Scottish National Party MSPs (five constituency members and one additional members)
- 5 Labour MSPs (two constituency members and three additional members)
- 3 Conservative MSP (all additional members)
- 2 Liberal Democrat MSPs (both constituency members)

==== Constituency results ====
2007 Scottish Parliament election: Mid Scotland and Fife
Constituency	Elected member	Result
Dunfermline East	Helen Eadie	Labour
Dunfermline West	Jim Tolson	Liberal Democrats gain from Labour
Fife Central	Tricia Marwick	SNP gain from Labour
Fife North East	Iain Smith	Liberal Democrats
Kirkcaldy	Marilyn Livingstone	Labour
North Tayside	John Swinney	SNP
Ochil	Keith Brown	SNP
Perth	Roseanna Cunningham	SNP
Stirling	Bruce Crawford	SNP gain from Labour

==== Additional member results ====
2007 Scottish Parliament election: Mid Scotland and Fife
Party	Elected candidates	Seats	+/−	Votes	%	+/−%
SNP	Chris Harvie	1	-1	90,090	33.0	+10.0
Labour	John Park; Claire Brennan-Baker; Richard Simpson	3	+3	71,922	26.3	+1.0
Conservative	Murdo Fraser; Liz Smith; Ted Brocklebank	3	±0	44,341	16.2	-1.3
Liberal Democrats		0	-1	36,195	13.2	+1.2
Green		0	-1	10,318	3.8	-3.1
Scottish Senior Citizens		0	0	5,523	2.0	N/A
BNP		0	0	2,620	1.0	N/A
Solidarity		0	0	2,468	0.9	N/A
Scottish Christian		0	0	1,698	0.6	N/A
UKIP		0	0	1,587	0.6	-0.4
Socialist Labour		0	0	1,523	0.6	-0.4
Publican Party		0	0	1,309	0.5	N/A
Scottish Socialist		0	0	1,116	0.4	-4.2
Scottish Voice		0	0	919	0.3	N/A
CPA		0	0	790	0.3	N/A
Free Scotland Party		0	0	664	0.2	N/A

=== 2003 Scottish Parliament election ===
In the 2003 Scottish Parliament election the region elected MSPs as follows:

- 5 Labour MSPs (all constituency members)
- 5 Scottish National Party MSPs (3 constituency members and 2 additional members)
- 3 Conservative MSP (all additional members)
- 2 Liberal Democrat MSPs (one constituency member and one additional member)
- 1 Scottish Greens MSP (additional member)

==== Constituency results ====
2003 Scottish Parliament election: Mid Scotland and Fife
Constituency	Elected member	Result
Dunfermline East	Helen Eadie	Labour
Dunfermline West	Scott Barrie	Labour
Fife Central	Christine May	Labour
Fife North East	Iain Smith	Liberal Democrats
Kirkcaldy	Marilyn Livingstone	Labour
North Tayside	John Swinney	SNP
Ochil	George Reid	SNP
Perth	Roseanna Cunningham	SNP
Stirling	Sylvia Jackson	Labour

==== Additional member results ====
2003 Scottish Parliament election: Mid Scotland and Fife
Party	Elected candidates	Seats	+/−	Votes	%	+/−%
Labour		0	0	63,239	25.3	-8.0
SNP	Bruce Crawford; Tricia Marwick	2	−1	57,631	23.0	-5.7
Conservative	Murdo Fraser; Brian Monteith; Ted Brocklebank	3	±0	43,941	17.6	-1.0
Liberal Democrats	Keith Raffan	1	±0	30,112	12.0	-0.7
Green	Mark Ruskell	1	+1	17,147	6.9	+3.0
Scottish Socialist		0	0	11,401	4.6	+3.6
Scottish Pensioners		0	0	8,380	3.4	N/A
Fighting Scottish Hospital Closures		0	0	5,064	2.0	N/A
Save Local Hospitals		0	0	4,622	1.9	N/A
UKIP		0	0	2,355	0.9	N/A
Socialist Labour		0	0	2,273	0.9	-0.5
Scottish People's		0	0	1,191	0.5	N/A
Christian Independent Alliance		0	0	1,064	0.4	N/A
Independent		0	0	996	0.4	N/A
Independent		0	0	637	0.3	N/A

Changes:

- Andrew Arbuckle replaced Keith Raffan. Raffan resigned from the Parliament in January 2005. Arbuckle was next on the Liberal Democrats' list.
- Brian Monteith resigned from the Conservatives in July 2005, and served the remainder of the term as an Independent MSP.

=== 1999 Scottish Parliament election ===
In the 1999 Scottish Parliament election the region elected MSPs as follows:

- 6 Labour MSPs (six constituency members)
- 5 Scottish National Party MSPs (two constituency members three additional members)
- 3 Conservative MSP (three additional members)
- 2 Liberal Democrat MSPs (one constituency member and one additional member)

==== Constituency results ====
1999 Scottish Parliament election: Mid Scotland and Fife
Constituency	Elected member	Result
Dunfermline East	Helen Eadie	Scottish Labour Party win (new seat)
Dunfermline West	Scott Barrie	Scottish Labour Party win (new seat)
Fife Central	Henry McLeish	Scottish Labour Party win (new seat)
Fife North East	Iain Smith	Scottish Liberal Democrats win (new seat)
Kirkaldy	Marilyn Livingstone	Scottish Labour Party win (new seat)
North Tayside	John Swinney	Scottish National Party win (new seat)
Ochil	Richard Simpson	Scottish Labour Party win (new seat)
Perth	Roseanna Cunningham	Scottish National Party win (new seat)
Stirling	Sylvia Jackson	Scottish Labour Party win (new seat)

==== Additional member results ====
1999 Scottish Parliament election: Mid Scotland and Fife
Party	Elected candidates	Seats	+/−	Votes	%	+/−%
Labour		0	N/A	101,964	33.3	N/A
SNP	George Reid; Bruce Crawford; Tricia Marwick	3	N/A	87,659	28.7	N/A
Conservative	Keith Harding; Nick Johnston; Brian Monteith	3	N/A	56,719	18.6	N/A
Liberal Democrats	Keith Raffan	1	N/A	38,896	12.7	N/A
Green		0	N/A	11,821	3.9	N/A
Socialist Labour		0	N/A	4,266	1.4	N/A
Scottish Socialist		0	N/A	3,044	1.0	N/A
ProLife Alliance		0	N/A	735	0.2	N/A
Natural Law		0	N/A	558	0.2	N/A

Changes:

- Murdo Fraser replaced Nick Johnston, who had resigned from the Parliament on 10 August 2001 due to ill health. Fraser was next on the Conservative and Unionist list.
