= Same-sex marriage in Scotland =

Same-sex marriage has been legal in Scotland since 16 December 2014. As family law is not reserved to the Parliament of the United Kingdom, the Scottish Parliament has legislative competence to make changes to the law on marriage. A same-sex marriage law, the Marriage and Civil Partnership (Scotland) Act 2014, was approved by the Scottish Parliament on 4 February 2014 and received royal assent by Queen Elizabeth II on 12 March. It came into effect on 16 December with many civil partners converting their relationships into marriages, while the first same-sex marriage ceremonies occurred on 31 December 2014.

Civil partnerships for same-sex couples have also been legal in Scotland since 2005 following enactment of the Civil Partnership Act 2004.

== Civil partnerships ==
=== Legislative action ===
Civil partnerships have been recognised for same-sex couples in Scotland since 2005 following the enactment of the Civil Partnership Act 2004 (Scottish Gaelic: Achd Com-pàirteachasan Sìobhalta 2004, pronounced [axk kʰomˈpʰaːrˠʃt̪əxəs̪ən ˈʃiːvəl̪ˠt̪ə]; Scots: Ceevil Pairtnery Act 2004, pronounced [ˈsiːvɪl ˈpeːrtnəri ak(t)]). The Act gives same-sex couples most, but not all, of the rights and responsibilities of civil marriage. Civil partners are entitled to the same property rights as married opposite-sex couples, the same exemption as married couples on inheritance tax, social security and pension benefits, and the ability to receive parental responsibility for a partner's children, as well as responsibility for reasonable maintenance of one's partner and their children, tenancy rights, full life insurance recognition, next of kin rights in hospitals, and others. There is a formal process for dissolving partnerships akin to divorce.

The legalisation of same-sex marriage in Scotland has had several notable impacts on legislation relating to Scottish civil partnerships. The Scottish Government has elected to introduce:

- Possible tests for religious and belief bodies to meet when solemnising marriages or registering civil partnerships, in light of increasing concerns over sham and forced marriages.
- Religious and belief ceremonies to register civil partnerships.

Since November 2015, civil partnerships originating from elsewhere in the United Kingdom (including Northern Ireland) can be converted into marriages without the couples being forced to dissolve their civil partnerships. In June 2020, the Scottish Parliament passed legislation opening civil partnerships to different-sex couples.

=== Statistics ===
According to the National Records of Scotland, 6,278 same-sex civil partnerships were registered in Scotland between 2005 and 2024. By Scottish council area, most same-sex partnerships were performed in the City of Edinburgh (1,631), followed by Glasgow City (1,203), Dumfries and Galloway (638), Fife (290), Highland (237), Aberdeen City (205), Argyll and Bute (162), Perth and Kinross (158), Dundee City (148), South Lanarkshire (126), Aberdeenshire (123), Stirling (120), the Scottish Borders (116), North Ayrshire (112), South Ayrshire (104), West Lothian (101), North Lanarkshire (99), East Lothian (94), Falkirk (89), Renfrewshire (74), Moray (64), Midlothian (59), Angus (56), West Dunbartonshire (52), East Dunbartonshire (51), East Ayrshire (46), East Renfrewshire (43), Clackmannanshire (33), Inverclyde (27), the Orkney Islands (7) and the Shetland Islands (7), and Na h-Eileanan Siar (3).

== Same-sex marriage ==
Laws regarding same-sex partnerships in Europe¹ Marriage Civil union Limited domestic recognition (cohabitation) Unrecognized Constitution limits marriage to opposite-sex couples ¹ May include recent laws or court decisions that have not yet entered into effect.

=== Petition ===
In January 2009, a petition was drawn up by Nick Henderson, director of the LGBT Network, to be submitted to the Scottish Parliament. The petition called for a change to the law that disallowed two people of the same sex from getting married, by amending the Marriage (Scotland) Act 1977. The petition also called for allowing same-sex marriage ceremonies to be performed by faith groups, but only if the religious institution agreed. As well as political support from the leader of the Labour Party in the European Parliament, Glenis Willmott, and MEP and veteran gay rights activist Michael Cashman, the petition drew the signatures and support of Celia Kitzinger and Sue Wilkinson and of eight church leaders, both of the Scottish Episcopal Church and the Church of Scotland. The Very Reverend Kelvin Holdsworth, provost of St Mary's Cathedral in Glasgow, has often spoken of his willingness and desire to perform valid same-sex marriages in his church, and was a key supporter of the petition. It also attracted high-profile support from Labour MSP George Foulkes. The petition closed on 6 March, having gathered 1,007 signatures.

On 17 March 2009, the Public Petitions Committee unanimously agreed to question the Scottish Government on whether and when it planned to amend the Marriage (Scotland) Act 1977 to allow same-sex marriages. They also requested that a reason be provided if an amendment could not be considered. In March 2009, shortly before submission of the LGBT Network's petition to the Scottish Parliament, the National Union of Students Scotland established an "Equal Marriage Campaign" (Scottish Gaelic: Iomairt Co-ionannachd Pòsaidh, Scots: Equal Mairiage Campaign), launching a similar petition to the Scottish Parliament and calling for the legalisation of same-sex marriage and mixed-sex civil partnerships in Scotland, although the petition itself did not distinguish between civil and religious marriage. This campaign attracted the support of a number of MSPs and MEPs, as well as activist organisations and individuals. The petition closed on 1 September 2009, having gathered 1,317 signatures. On 8 September, the Public Petitions Committee convened after a summer recess, and agreed to contact the government seeking responses to specific points raised in both petitions and the discussion.

On 1 December 2009, the Public Petitions Committee decided to seek a meeting between a government minister and the petitioners, as well as enquire as to whether the government might consider setting up an advisory committee of interested parties. The government rejected the petition, as legalising same-sex marriage in Scotland only would require changes in non-devolved matters such as the areas of immigration, pensions and inheritance law all of which would have to be done at national level. The head of the government's equality unit, Hilary Third, said that although from an equality point of view "equal marriage is where we want to be" it would be a "difficult situation" if same-sex marriage was legal in Scotland but not in England. In 2011, Her Majesty's Government announced a consultation on the legalisation of same-sex marriage in England and Wales would be held, and it began in March 2012.

=== Consultation ===
From September to December 2011, the Scottish Government held a consultation on the issue after the Scottish Social Attitudes Survey found 60% of Scots to be in favour of legalising same-sex marriages in Scotland. The consultation offered consideration on both removing religious prohibitions for civil partnerships and also legalising same-sex marriage. In the foreword to the consultation document, Deputy First Minister Nicola Sturgeon stated:

The Scottish Government is choosing to make its initial views clear at the outset of this consultation. We tend towards the view that religious ceremonies for civil partnerships should no longer be prohibited and that same-sex marriage should be introduced so that same-sex couples have the option of getting married if that is how they wish to demonstrate their commitment to each other. We also believe that no religious body or its celebrants should be required to carry out same-sex marriages or civil partnership ceremonies.

Unlike the English and Welsh consultation, the one for Scotland dealt with the issue of same-sex marriage in a religious context. On 10 December 2011, The Scotsman newspaper reported that some 50,000 responses had been received from within Scotland. In reality, when counting was finished, the total stood at 77,508. The government presented the results and analysis of the consultation in July 2012. Respondents who opposed the introduction of same-sex marriage were in the majority, with 67%. However, 14,869 (19%) of responses came from outside of Scotland and 26,383 (34%) were submitted by a pre-printed postcard rather than via the proper consultation form.

=== Legislation ===
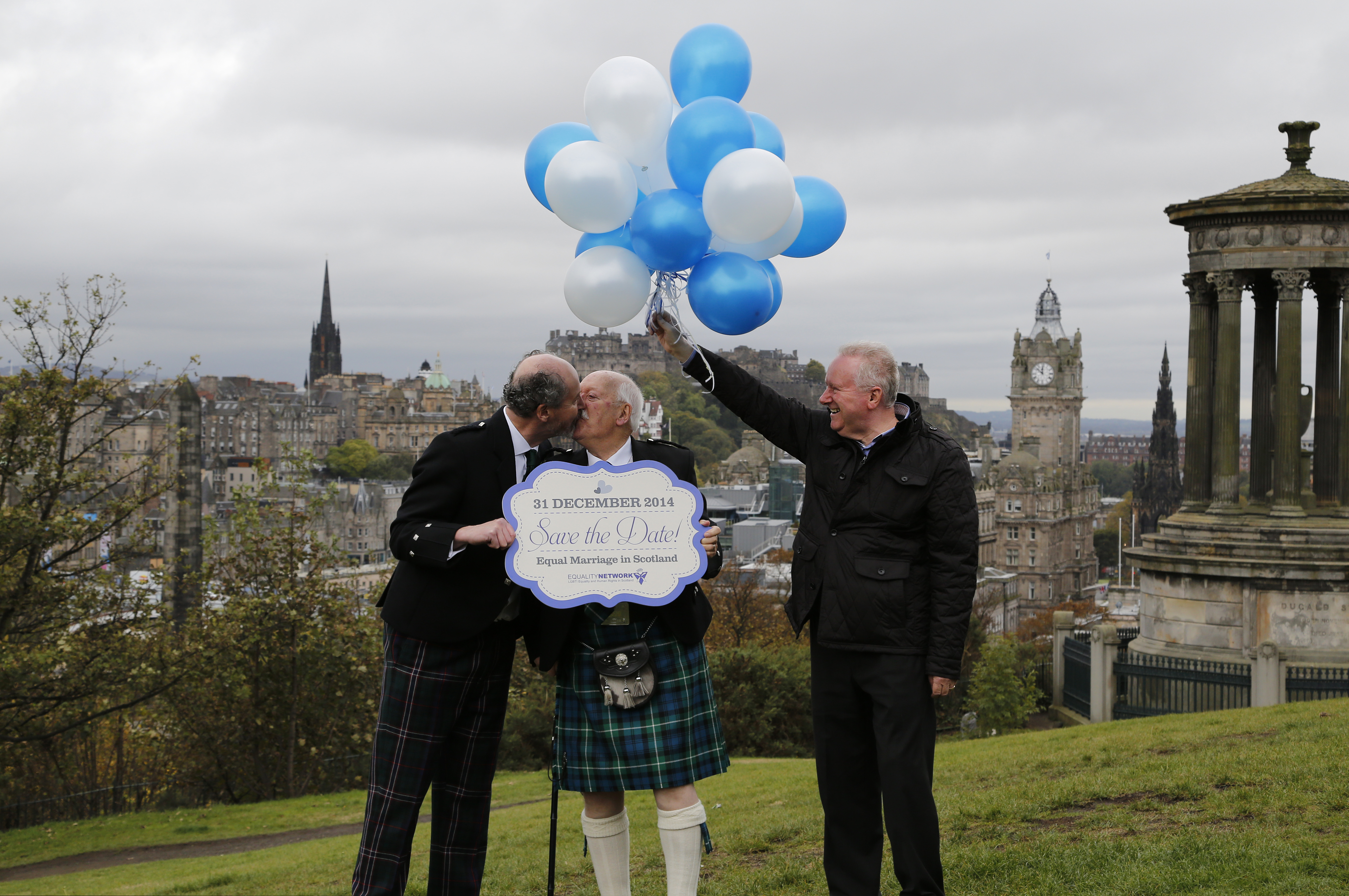
MSP Alex Neil with a same-sex couple in 2014

On 25 July 2012, the Scottish Government announced it would bring forward legislation to legalise both civil and religious same-sex marriage in Scotland. It reiterated its intention to ensure that no religious group or individual member of the clergy would be forced to conduct such ceremonies; it also stated its intention to work with the Parliament of the United Kingdom to make necessary changes to the Equality Act 2010 to ensure that this would be guaranteed. On 27 June 2013, the Scottish Government introduced the Marriage and Civil Partnerships (Scotland) Bill to the Scottish Parliament. LGBT rights campaigners, celebrating outside the UK Parliament on 15 July 2013 for the clearance of the Marriage (Same Sex Couples) Act 2013 in the House of Lords, declared that they would continue the campaign to extend same-sex marriage rights to both Scotland and Northern Ireland. A majority of members of the Scottish Parliament had declared their support for same-sex marriage, including the leaders of each party in Parliament: Alex Salmond (Scottish National Party (SNP); the First Minister of Scotland), Johann Lamont (Labour), Ruth Davidson (Conservative), Willie Rennie (Liberal Democrats) and Patrick Harvie (Green).

The bill was fast-tracked through the Scottish Parliament with the aim of achieving royal assent for the legislation by March 2014. The Equal Opportunities Committee considered the bill from 5 September to 7 November, with a report published on 8 November. On 20 November, the bill passed its first stage with a 98 to 15 vote and five abstentions. Of the 98 MSPs that voted "yes" on the bill, 52 were members of the SNP, 31 were members of the Labour Party, seven were members of the Conservative Party, four were members of the Liberal Democrats, two were members of the Green Party, and two were independents. Of the 15 MSPs that voted "no" on the bill, 6 were members of the Scottish National Party, 8 were members of the Conservative Party, and one was a member of the Labour Party. Of the five MSPs who abstained, two were members of the SNP, and three were members of the Labour Party.

The bill returned to the Equal Opportunities Committee for its second stage. The Committee considered the bill on 19 December 2013, rejecting several amendments proposed by opponents of the legislation. The Committee continued the second stage on 16 January 2014. The final stage debate and vote was held on 4 February. The bill was approved with 105 MSPs in favour and 18 opposed, with no abstentions. It received royal assent by Queen Elizabeth II on 12 March, and came into effect on 16 December. Civil partners began converting their relationships into marriages on that date, and the first same-sex marriages occurred on 31 December 2014. The first same-sex couple to marry in Scotland were Susan and Gerrie Douglas-Scott on 31 December in Glasgow, with sixteen other same-sex couples marrying across Scotland later that same day.

4 February 2014 vote in the Parliament
Party	Voted for	Voted against	Abstained	Absent (Did not vote)
G Scottish National Party	56: George Adam; Clare Adamson; Christian Allard; Colin Beattie; Marco Biagi; Chic Brodie; Keith Brown; Margaret Burgess; Aileen Campbell; Roderick Campbell; Willie Coffey; Angela Constance; Bruce Crawford; Graeme Dey; Nigel Don; Bob Doris; James Dornan; Jim Eadie; Annabelle Ewing; Linda Fabiani; Joe FitzPatrick; Kenneth Gibson; Rob Gibson; Jamie Hepburn; Fiona Hyslop; Adam Ingram; Colin Keir; Bill Kidd; Richard Lochhead; Kenny MacAskill; Gordon MacDonald; Derek Mackay; Mike MacKenzie; Michael Matheson; Stewart Maxwell; Joan McAlpine; Mark McDonald; Christina McKelvie; Aileen McLeod; Fiona McLeod; Stuart McMillan; Alex Neil; Gil Paterson; Dennis Robertson; Shona Robison; Michael Russell; Alex Salmond; Stewart Stevenson; Kevin Stewart; Nicola Sturgeon; John Swinney; David Torrance; Maureen Watt; Paul Wheelhouse; Sandra White; John Wilson	7: Alasdair Allan; Roseanna Cunningham; Fergus Ewing; Richard Lyle; Angus MacDonald; John Mason; Dave Thompson	–	2: Christine Grahame; Humza Yousaf
Scottish Labour	33: Jackie Baillie; Claire Baker; Richard Baker; Jayne Baxter; Claudia Beamish; Neil Bibby; Sarah Boyack; Malcolm Chisholm; Kezia Dugdale; Mary Fee; Patricia Ferguson; Neil Findlay; Rhoda Grant; Iain Gray; Mark Griffin; Hugh Henry; Cara Hilton; James Kelly; Johann Lamont; Lewis Macdonald; Ken Macintosh; Hanzala Malik; Jenny Marra; Paul Martin; Margaret McCulloch; Duncan McNeil; Anne McTaggart; Elaine Murray; Graeme Pearson; John Pentland; Alex Rowley; Drew Smith; David Stewart	3: Michael McMahon; Siobhan McMahon; Elaine Smith	–	2: Margaret McDougall; Richard Simpson
Scottish Conservatives	7: Cameron Buchanan; Jackson Carlaw; Ruth Davidson; Annabel Goldie; John Lamont; Mary Scanlon; John Scott	8: Gavin Brown; Alex Fergusson; Murdo Fraser; Alex Johnstone; Jamie McGrigor; Nanette Milne; Margaret Mitchell; Liz Smith	–	–
Scottish Liberal Democrats	5: Jim Hume; Liam McArthur; Alison McInnes; Willie Rennie; Tavish Scott	–	–	–
Scottish Greens	2: Patrick Harvie; Alison Johnstone	–	–	–
Independent	2: John Finnie; Jean Urquhart	–	–	1: Margo MacDonald
Total (Note: The Scottish Parliament has 128 voting members. The Presiding Officer of the Scottish Parliament, Tricia Marwick, votes only in case of a tied vote.)	105	18	0	5
Total	82.0%	14.1%	0.0%	3.1%

The Marriage and Civil Partnership (Scotland) Act 2014 (Scottish Gaelic: Achd Pòsaidh is Com-pàirteachasan Sìobhalta (Alba) 2014, pronounced [axk ˈpʰɔːs̪əɣ ɪs̪ kʰomˈpʰaːrˠʃt̪əxəs̪ən ˈʃiːvəl̪ˠt̪ə ˈal̪ˠapə]; Scots: Mairiage and Ceevil Pairtnery (Scotland) Act 2014, pronounced [ˈmeːrɪdʒ an(d) ˈsiːvɪl ˈpeːrtnəri ˈskotlən(d) ak(t)]) contains a provision stating:

In the reserved law of Scotland, marriage has the same effect in relation to same sex couples as it has in relation to opposite sex couples.

=== Statistics ===
462 same-sex marriages were performed in Scotland in the first five months after the law came into force, accounting for 12% of all marriages performed during that time. Statistics published by the National Records of Scotland showed that 1,671 same-sex marriages took place in Scotland in 2015. Of these, 935 were conversions from existing civil partnerships and 736 were new marriages. Figures for 2020 are much lower than previous years because of the restrictions in place due to the COVID-19 pandemic. By the end of September 2024, more than 10,000 same-sex couples had married in Scotland.

Number of marriages performed in Scotland
Year	Same-sex marriages	Opposite-sex marriages	Total marriages	% same-sex
2014	367	28,702	29,069	1.26%
2015	1,671	28,020	29,691	5.63%
2016	998	28,231	29,229	3.41%
2017	982	27,458	28,440	3.45%
2018	979	26,546	27,525	3.56%
2019	912	25,095	26,007	3.51%
2020	423	11,563	11,986	3.53%
2021	819	23,465	24,284	3.37%
2022	1,112	28,921	30,033	3.70%
2023	1,040	25,713	26,753	3.89%
2024	1,086	25,869	26,955	4.03%
2025	1,108	26,083	27,191	4.07%

=== Religious performance ===
In June 2016, the Scottish Episcopal Church became the first British province in the Anglican Communion to take steps to allow same-sex marriages to be performed in its churches. The General Synod voted in favour of a motion to begin discussion amongst the seven dioceses to remove the doctrinal clause that marriage was "between a man and a woman". The vote received support from five of seven bishops, 69% of the clergy and 80% of the laity. The General Synod formally approved the change to the doctrinal clause in June 2017, removing language stating that marriages could only be "between a man and a woman" and introducing a new conscience clause allowing clergy to opt out of performing same-sex weddings. On 20 July 2017, it was announced that a same-sex wedding was to be held at St Mary's Cathedral in Glasgow later in the summer. On 1 August 2017, a same-sex marriage, which included the Eucharist as a nuptial mass, was held at the Church of St John the Evangelist in Edinburgh. The Scottish Episcopal Church is estimated to have 100,000 members, and offers same-sex marriage to other Anglicans, including members of churches in England and the United States.

In May 2018, the Church of Scotland voted to draft new laws that would allow ministers to conduct same-sex marriages. The motion was passed by the General Assembly by a vote of 345 to 170. The legal questions committee had two years to draft legislation. In May 2021, the General Assembly voted 319–217 to approve the draft legislation. The law includes safeguards for ministers opposed to performing same-sex marriages. The presbyteries voted 29–12 in support of the legislation in April, and the General Assembly gave its final approval on 23 May 2022 by 274 votes to 136. Reverend Scott Rennie, the Minister of Queen's Cross Church in Aberdeen, welcomed the move, saying, "My marriage to my husband, Dave, nurtures my life and my ministry, and frankly I do not think I could be a minister of this church without his love and support. It is always there in the background. Same-sex marriage is like opposite-sex marriage and it has its joys and sorrows, its glories and its tensions. It’s pretty normal, really."

Some smaller religious organisations also perform or bless same-sex marriages in their places of worship, including the United Reformed Church, the Open Episcopal Church, Quakers, Reform Jews, Liberal Jews, and the Scottish Pagan Federation. The first Pagan same-sex marriages took place in Edinburgh on 18 January 2015. In November 2022, Jennifer Andreacchi and Han Smith were married at the University of St Andrews by Liberal Jewish Rabbi Mark Solomon, marking the first Jewish same-sex marriage in Scotland.

== Public opinion ==
A 2014 opinion poll published by the Scottish Social Attitudes Survey showed that 68% of Scottish people supported same-sex marriage, while 17% opposed. Support was higher among young people (83%) than among people over 65 (44%), higher among women (72%) than men (63%), and higher among atheists or irreligious people (81%) than among Catholics (60%) or Church of Scotland adherents (59%).

== See also ==
- LGBT rights in Scotland
- Same-sex marriage in the United Kingdom
- Recognition of same-sex unions in the British Overseas Territories
- Recognition of same-sex unions in Europe
