= Dunfermline West =

Dunfermline West may mean or refer to:

- Dunfermline West (UK Parliament constituency)
- Dunfermline West (Scottish Parliament constituency)
