= Ted Brocklebank =

Scottish politician (born 1942)

Member of the Scottish Parliament for Mid Scotland and Fife (1 of 7 Regional MSPs)
- In office 1 May 2003 – 22 March 2011

Personal details
- Born: Edward Brocklebank; 24 September 1942 (age 83) St Andrews, Scotland
- Party: Scottish Conservative Party
- Education: Madras College
- Alma mater: University of St Andrews

Edward Brocklebank (born 24 September 1942) is a Scottish Conservative politician. He was a Member of the Scottish Parliament (MSP) for the Mid Scotland and Fife from 2003 to 2011.

== Education ==
Brocklebank was educated at Madras College in St Andrews and after leaving school, he pursued a career in journalism at the Dundee-based DC Thomson & Co. Brocklebank returned to education later in life, and graduated from the University of St Andrews in 2017 with a degree in History and English at the age of 75.

== Career ==
Brocklebank was previously a journalist and a television producer, having been Head of News and Current Affairs at Grampian Television. He stood for the Fife North East constituency in the 1999 Scottish Parliament election, coming second to Liberal Democrat Iain Smith. This was repeated in the 2003 election, although the Conservatives' share of the vote increased. This time however, Brocklebank was elected through the regional list for Mid Scotland and Fife.

Brocklebank was the rural affairs spokesman of the Scottish Conservative and Unionist Party, and a member of the party's Shadow Cabinet. In February 2007 he resigned from the Shadow Cabinet after David Cameron changed the party's stance on fisheries, specifically the threat of withdrawal from the EU's Common Fisheries Policy. Mr Brocklebank did not seek re-election at the 2011 Scottish Parliament election.
