= Dunfermline West (Scottish Parliament constituency) =

Region or constituency of the Scottish Parliament

- Former burgh constituency for the Scottish Parliament
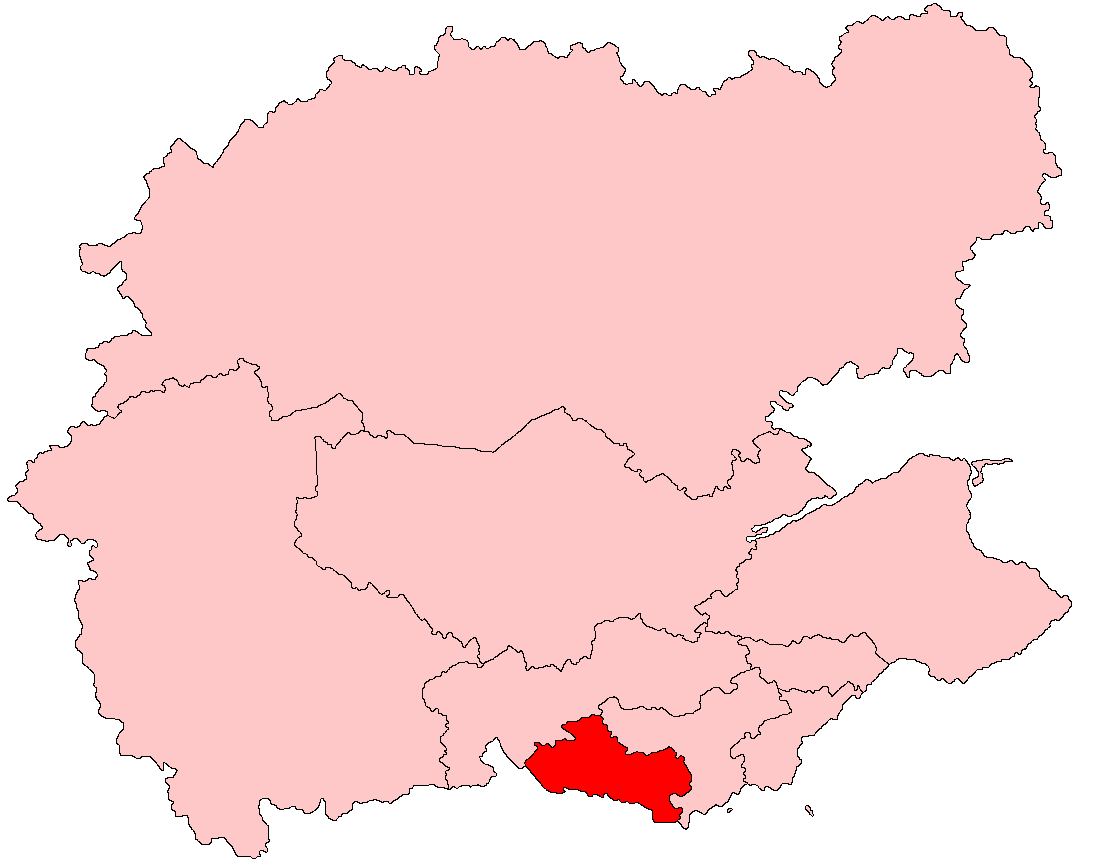

- Dunfermline West shown within the Mid Scotland and Fife electoral region and the region shown within Scotland

Former constituency
- Created: 1999
- Abolished: 2011
- Council area: Fife

Dunfermline West was a constituency of the Scottish Parliament (Holyrood). It elected one Member of the Scottish Parliament (MSP) by the plurality (first past the post) method of election. It was abolised for the 2011 Scottish Parliament election, with parts of the constituency being merged with Dunfermline East to form a single Dunfermline constituency.

== Electoral region ==
The region covered all of the Clackmannanshire council area, all of the Fife council area, all of the Perth and Kinross council area, all of the Stirling council area and parts of the Angus council area.

== Constituency boundaries and council area ==
The constituency was created at the same time as the Scottish Parliament, in 1999, with the name and boundaries of a pre-existing Westminster (House of Commons) constituency. In 2005, however, Scottish Westminster constituencies were mostly replaced with new constituencies. The Dunfermline West Westminster constituency was merged into Dunfermline and West Fife.

The Holyrood constituency of Dunfermline West was one of five Mid Scotland and Fife constituencies covering the Fife council area, the others being Dunfermline East, Fife Central, Fife North East and Kirkcaldy. All were entirely within the council area. Dunfermline West covered a south-western portion of the council area, west of Dunfermline East.

== Description of the constituency ==
The constituency included all of the town of Dunfermline and some land on the north bank of the Firth of Forth. Historically, the town was once Scotland's capital city. Eight kings are buried there, amongst them Robert the Bruce. Today, textiles, engineering and synthetic material manufacturing are the primary industries. The constituency also contains rural areas. Like its neighbour, Dunfermline East, the constituency was one of Labour’s safest seats in Scotland. In Westminster elections voters in the area elected Labour Members of Parliament (MPs) continuously from 1935 until 2006. In a 2006 by-election, however, the Liberal Democrats won the equivalent Westminster seat, and they proceeded to win the Holyrood seat in 2007 as well, calling into question Labour's future as a dominant party in the area.

== Member of the Scottish Parliament ==
Election	Member	Party
1999	Scott Barrie	Labour
2007	Jim Tolson	Liberal Democrats
2011	Constituency abolished; see Dunfermline	

== Election results ==
2007 Scottish Parliament election: Dunfermline West
Party	Candidate	Votes	%	±%
Liberal Democrats	Jim Tolson	9,952	33.7	+19.3
Labour	Scott Barrie	9,476	32.1	−2.2
SNP	Len Woods	7,296	24.7	+7.3
Conservative	Peter Lyburn	2,363	8.0	+0.6
Scottish Voice	Susan Archibald	238	1.5	New
Majority		476	1.6	N/A
Turnout		29,252	51.8	+5.0
Liberal Democrats gain from Labour		Swing	+10.8	

2003 Scottish Parliament election: Dunfermline West
Party	Candidate	Votes	%	±%
Labour	Scott Barrie	8,644	34.3	−9.9
Independent Campaign for Local Hospital Services	David Wishart	4,584	18.2	New
SNP	Brian Goodall	4,372	17.4	−10.4
Liberal Democrats	Jim Tolson	3,636	14.4	−3.8
Conservative	Jim Mackie	1,868	7.4	−2.3
Scottish Socialist	Andy Jackson	923	3.7	New
Independent	Alastair Harper	714	2.8	New
Independent	Damien Quigg	459	1.8	New
Majority		4,080	16.1	−0.3
Turnout		25,240	46.8	
Labour hold		Swing		

1999 Scottish Parliament election: Dunfermline West
Party	Candidate	Votes	%	±%
Labour	Scott Barrie	13,560	44.21	N/A
SNP	Douglas Chapman	8,539	27.84	N/A
Liberal Democrats	Elizabeth Harris	5,591	18.23	N/A
Conservative	James Mackie	2,981	9.72	N/A
Majority		5,021	16.37	N/A
Turnout		30,671		N/A
Labour win (new seat)				

== See also ==
- Dunfermline West (UK Parliament constituency)
