= Brian Monteith =

British politician, public relations consultant and commentator(born 1958)

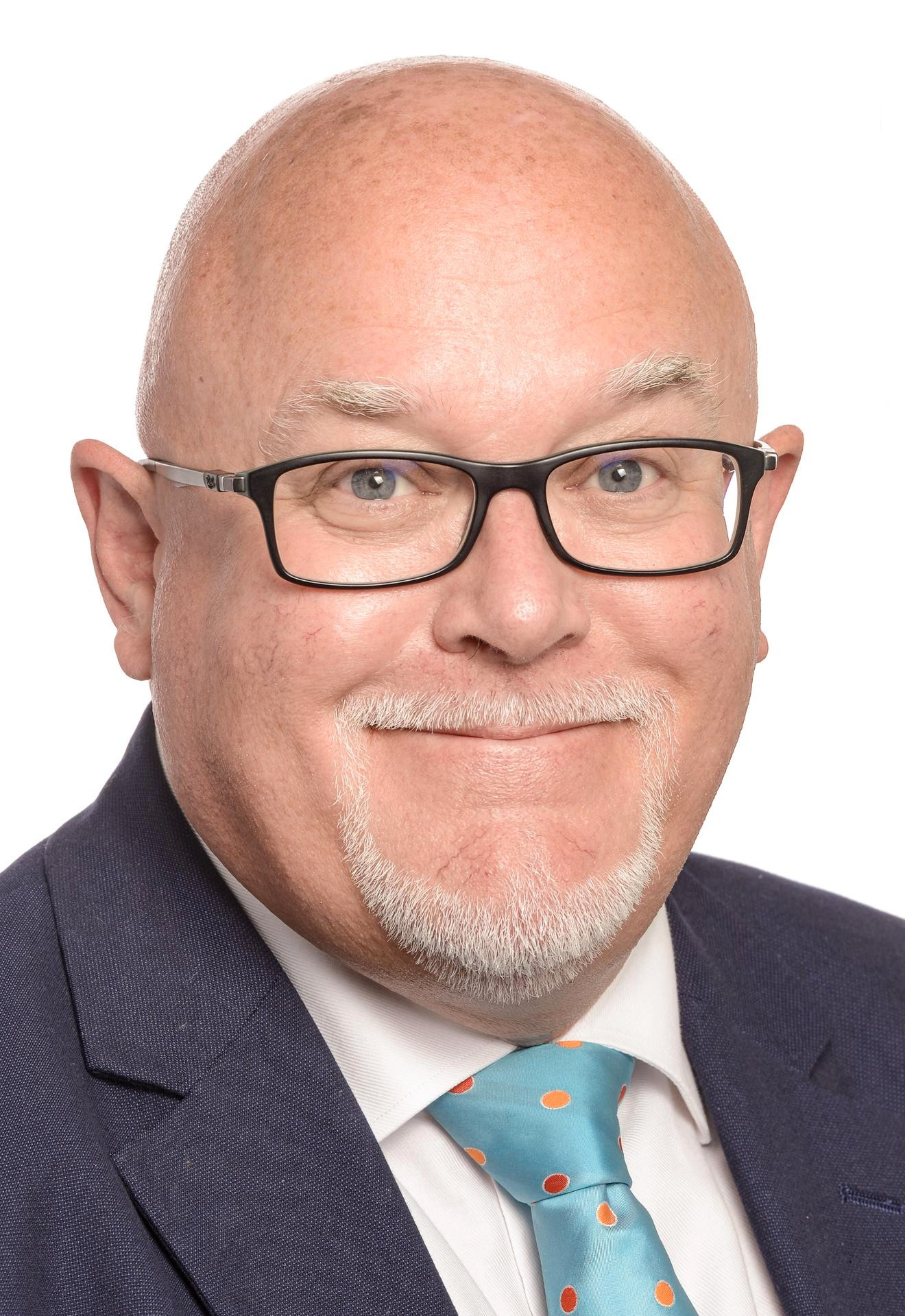
- Official portrait, 2019

Member of the European Parliament for North East England
- In office 2 July 2019 – 31 January 2020
- Preceded by: Jonathan Arnott
- Succeeded by: Constituency abolished

Member of the Scottish Parliament for Mid Scotland and Fife (1 of 7 Regional MSPs)
- In office 6 May 1999 – 2 April 2007

Personal details
- Born: 8 January 1958 (age 68) Edinburgh, Scotland
- Party: Brexit (since 2019)
- Other political affiliations: Conservative (before 2019)
- Education: Portobello High School, Heriot-Watt University

Brian Monteith (born 8 January 1958) is a British politician, public relations consultant and commentator. As a member of the Scottish Conservatives, he was a Member of the Scottish Parliament (MSP) for the Mid Scotland and Fife region from 1999 to 2007. Later a member of the Brexit Party, he was a Member of the European Parliament (MEP) for North East England from 2019 to 2020.

== Early life and education ==
Monteith was born in January 1958 in Edinburgh, Scotland. He was educated at Portobello High School and Heriot-Watt University in Edinburgh. He was a member of the Federation of Conservative Students. He also organised a successful campaign to take Heriot-Watt out of the National Union of Students which they subsequently rejoined.

== Early career ==
Following university Monteith initially worked as a researcher for Thatcherite London-based think tank, the Centre for Policy Studies.

Monteith moved on to work in the public relations arena for Michael Forsyth Associates – Monteith shared a flat in London with his mentor and boss Michael Forsyth. Later Monteith set up Leith Communications public relations company in Edinburgh. The company however went bust in the early 1990s owing over £50,000 to creditors. This crisis forced Monteith to withdraw from standing for the Scottish Conservatives against Labour's John Smith in Monklands East in the 1992 general election.

Monteith went on to be the leader of the unsuccessful Think Twice "No-No" campaign in the 1997 Scottish devolution referendum which opposed the creation of the Scottish Parliament.

== Scottish Parliament ==
Monteith was elected to the Scottish Parliament as a Scottish Conservative and Unionist Party list member for the Mid Scotland and Fife region at the 1999 election. After election to the Scottish parliament Monteith developed a reputation as a Thatcherite disciple of former Scottish Secretary Michael Forsyth. He later argued in favour of giving more financial powers to the Scottish Parliament and wanted to move his party in a different direction ideologically and strategically.

Between 1999 and 2003 Montieth was the Conservative Party's Education, Arts, Culture & Sport spokesperson. In this role, Monteith lodged the first ever confidence motion in the Scottish Parliament in August 2000. This motion was lodged against Education Minister Sam Galbraith over the 2000 SQA exams controversy, where thousands of pupils received inaccurate grades from the examination body. Monteith's motion lacked enough support to be debated. However, a similar motion was later lodged by the Scottish National Party (SNP) MSP Mike Russell, this was defeated by a majority of 14.

In July 2005 Monteith resigned though as the Finance Spokesperson, stating that he wanted the freedom to discuss policy matters that "cut across other policy portfolios". Later that year the Scottish Conservative Party withdrew the whip from Monteith when it emerged that he had been briefing the media against the then Scottish Conservative leader David McLetchie regarding questions over McLetchie's £11,500 of claims for taxi expenses.

In 2006 Monteith announced he would not stand again as an MSP, saying he "would rather return to commerce than be a one-man band swimming against the treacly tide of collectivism in the Scottish Parliament".

== European Parliament ==
Monteith was elected as an MEP for the Brexit Party in the North East England constituency at the 2019 European Parliament election in the United Kingdom. During the election campaign, it was revealed Monteith's candidature listed a French address as his principal place of residence on his nomination papers, a practice allowed in European Parliament elections. He later revealed that he would be relocating to the United Kingdom.

== Other work ==
Monteith is a former chairman of English-Speaking Union Scotland and has had two stints working for the Botswanan government. Monteith is also an acquaintance of indicted American lobbyist Jack Abramoff.

Monteith is also in the course of writing a second book and writes regularly for many newspapers including a regular opinion column for the Edinburgh Evening News. He is also well known for being a supporter of Hibernian. His two sons are presently on the books of Edinburgh City.

Monteith is currently the editor of ThinkScotland.org and communications director of the lobbyists Global Britain. From December 2015 Brian Monteith was seconded to Leave.EU for the duration of the referendum campaign. He lives in the commune of Trevien in the department of Tarn in southern France.

Monteith is currently an advisory council member and shareholder of campaign group Britain Unbound Ltd.
