= Mark Ruskell =

Scottish Green politician

Mark Ruskell MSP
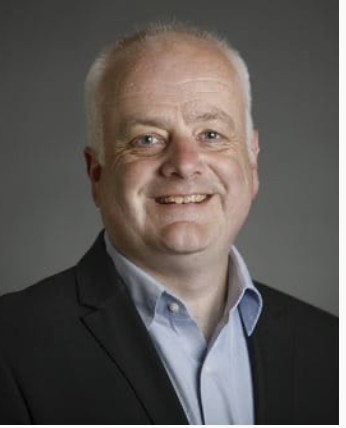

Member of the Scottish Parliament for Mid Scotland and Fife (1 of 7 Regional MSPs)
- Incumbent
- Assumed office 5 May 2016

Convener of the Rural Affairs Committee
- Incumbent
- Assumed office 10 June 2026

Scottish Green portfolios
- 2026–: Climate Action and Nature
- 2024–2026: Transport and Environment
- 2021–2024: Environment, Climate and Transport
- 2016–2021: Scottish Greens Spokesperson for Climate, Energy, Environment, Food and Farming

Personal details
- Born: Mark Christopher Ruskell; 14 May 1972 (age 54)
- Party: Scottish Greens
- Children: 2
- Website: https://greens.scot/team/mark-ruskell-msp

Mark Christopher Ruskell (born 14 May 1972) is a Scottish Green Member of the Scottish Parliament (MSP). He was elected to represent Mid Scotland and Fife from 2003−2007, then elected again in 2016, 2021 and 2026 Scottish Election. In the Scottish Parliament, Ruskell is the convener of the Rural Affairs Committee and the Greens' spokesperson on Climate Action and Nature.

== Early life ==
Mark Ruskell was born on 14 May 1972. He was educated at Stevenson College, Edinburgh, a further education college in the city. He studied environmental science and biology at the University of Stirling, graduating with a Bachelor of Science (BSc) degree, and sustainable agriculture at the Scottish Agricultural College and University of Aberdeen, graduating with a Master of Science (MSc) degree.

== Political career ==
In 2003 he was elected to represent Mid Scotland and Fife. He sat on the Scottish Parliament Environment and Rural Development Committee and served as its Deputy Convenor. He lost his seat in the 2007 elections.

In May 2012 he was elected to represent the Dunblane and Bridge of Allan ward of Stirling Council in the Scottish local elections, the first time the Scottish Green Party has had a representative on the council. He stepped down at the 2017 elections to concentrate on his role as a MSP. His party colleague Alasdair Tollemache replaced him as Councillor for Dunblane and Bridge of Allan at the 2017 poll.

His political career has involved fighting numerous campaigns for the Greens including standing in the 2001, 2010 and 2015 UK Westminster General Elections for Stirling and in every Scottish Parliament election since 1999.

He returned to Holyrood in 2016, representing the Mid-Scotland and Fife region, and was appointed as spokesperson for Climate, Energy, Environment, Food and Farming. He sat as a Member of the Environment, Climate Change and Land Reform Committee during Session 5. He was re-elected to Holyrood in 2021 and during Session 6 has been a member of the Net Zero Energy and Transport Committee and the Constitution Europe and External Affairs Committee. He held responsibility as spokesperson for Environment, Climate and Transport during the Bute House Agreement period when the Scottish Greens were in a power sharing agreement with the Scottish Government. From June 2024 to 2026 he was spokesperson for Transport and the Environment.

Ruskell was re-elected during the 2026 Scottish Election with 36,286 votes (12.7%), as one of seven regional list members in Mid Scotland and Fife. He is currently the Scottish Greens' spokesperson for Climate Action and Nature.
