= Kirkcaldy (Scottish Parliament constituency) =

Constituency of the Scottish Parliament

- Burgh constituency for the Scottish Parliament
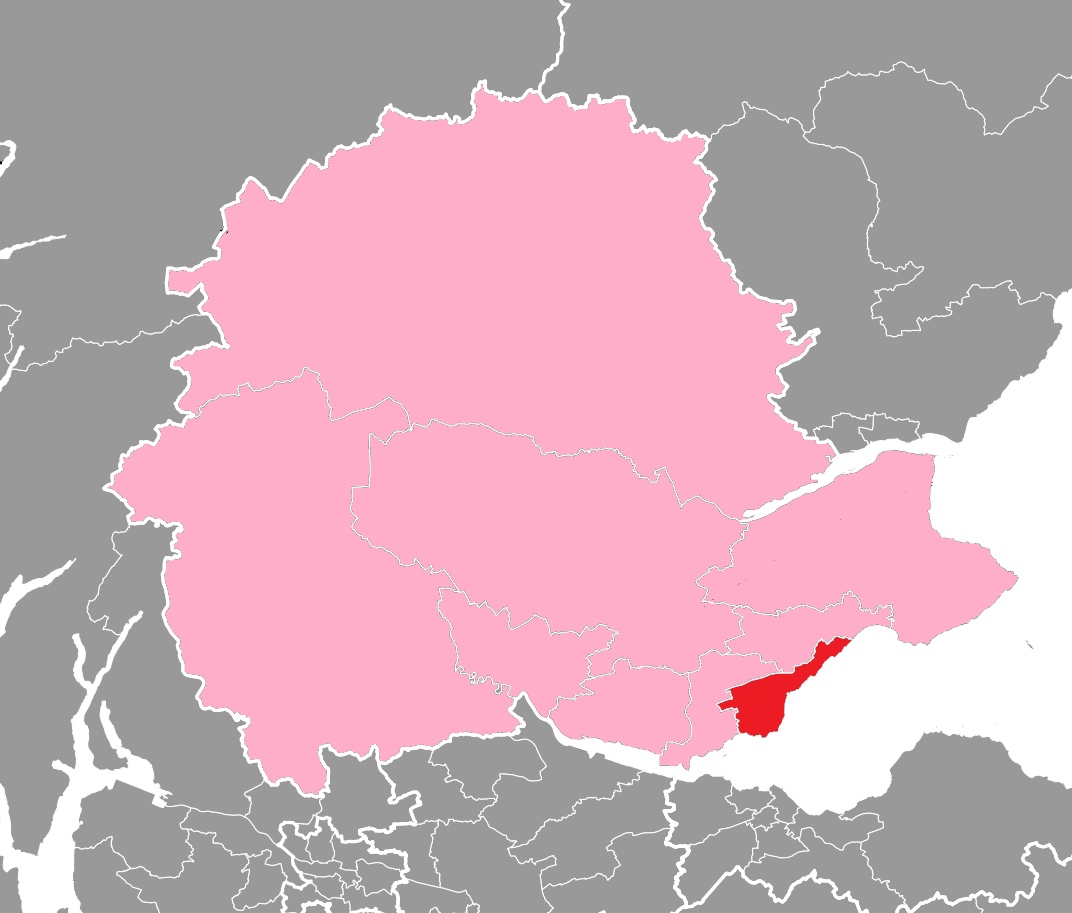

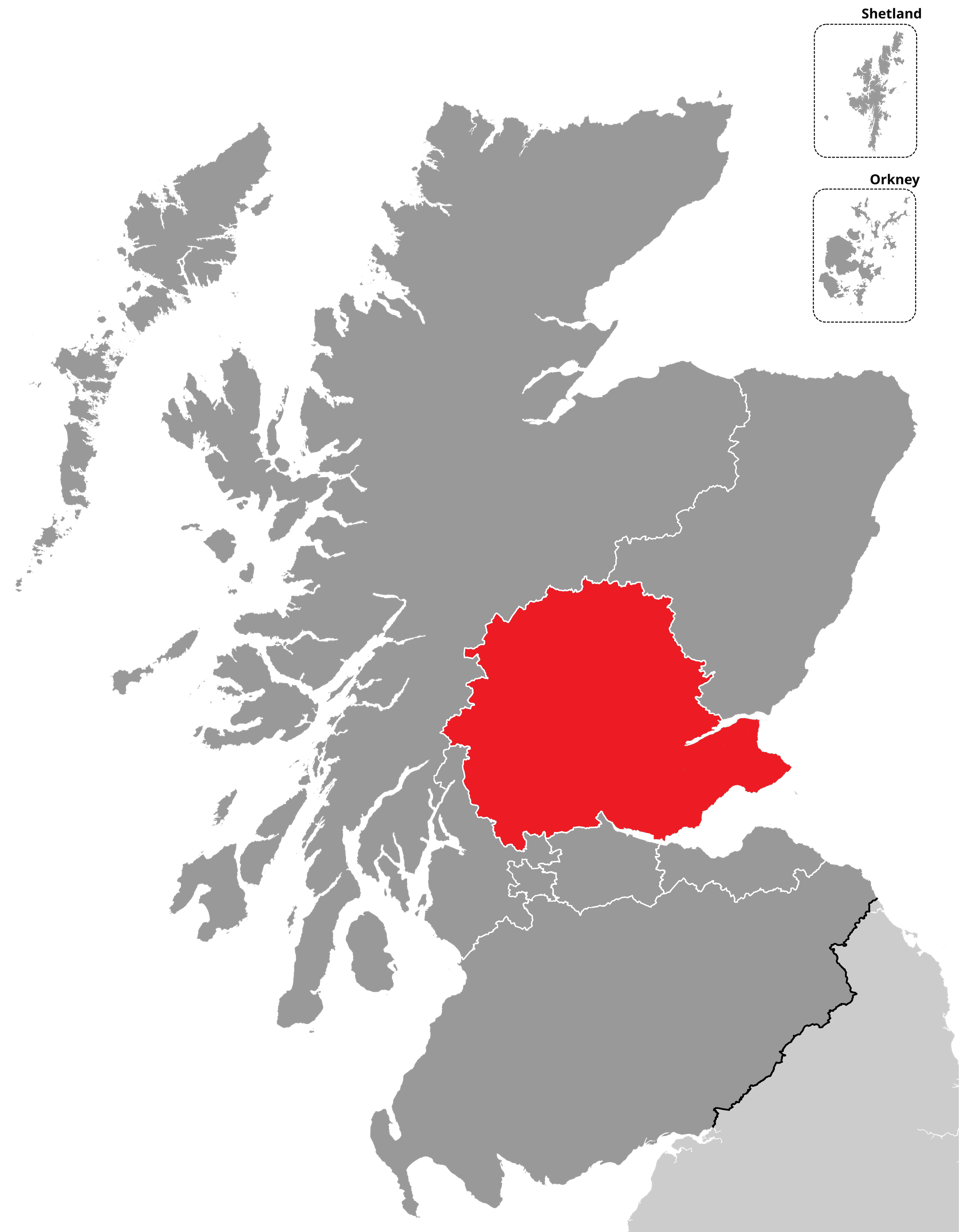
- Kirkcaldy shown within the Mid Scotland and Fife electoral region and the region shown within Scotland
- Electoral region: Mid Scotland and Fife
- Electorate: 62,405 (2026)

Current constituency
- Created: 1999
- Party: Scottish National Party
- MSP: David Torrance
- Council area: Fife

Kirkcaldy is a burgh constituency of the Scottish Parliament covering part of the council area of Fife. Under the additional-member electoral system used for elections to the Scottish Parliament, it elects one Member of the Scottish Parliament (MSP) by the plurality (first past the post) method of election. It also forms one of nine constituencies in the Mid Scotland and Fife electoral region, which elects seven additional members, in addition to nine constituency MSPs, to produce a form of proportional representation for the region as a whole.

The seat has been held by David Torrance of the Scottish National Party since the 2011 Scottish Parliament election.

== Electoral region ==
The other eight constituencies of the Mid Scotland and Fife region are: Clackmannanshire and Dunblane, Cowdenbeath, Dunfermline, Fife North East, Mid Fife and Glenrothes, Perthshire North, Perthshire South and Kinross-shire and Stirling. The region covers all of the Clackmannanshire council area, all of the Fife council area, all of the Perth and Kinross council area and all of the Stirling council area.

== Constituency boundaries and council area ==
Map of boundaries from 2011

Fife is represented in the Scottish Parliament by five constituencies, Cowdenbeath, Dunfermline, Fife North East, Kirkcaldy, and Mid Fife and Glenrothes.

The Kirkcaldy constituency was created at the same time as the Scottish Parliament, for the 1999 Scottish Parliament election, using the name and boundaries of a pre-existing House of Commons constituency. Ahead of the 2005 United Kingdom general election UK and Scottish parliamentary constituencies were separated, and there is no longer any link between the two sets of boundaries. The Kirkcaldy Westminster constituency was divided between Glenrothes and Kirkcaldy and Cowdenbeath.

The boundaries of the seat were reviewed ahead of the 2011 Scottish Parliament election as part of the first periodic review of Scottish Parliament boundaries. The following electoral wards of Fife Council were used to define the constituency of Kirkcaldy:

- Burntisland, Kinghorn and Western Kirkcaldy (entire ward)
- Buckhaven, Methil and Wemyss Villages (entire ward)
- Kirkcaldy Central (entire ward)
- Kirkcaldy East (entire ward)
- Kirkcaldy North (entire ward)

At the second periodic review of Scottish Parliament boundaries in 2025 the seat boundaries were unchanged.

== Member of the Scottish Parliament ==
Election	Member	Party
1999	Marilyn Livingstone	Labour
2011	David Torrance	SNP

== Election results ==
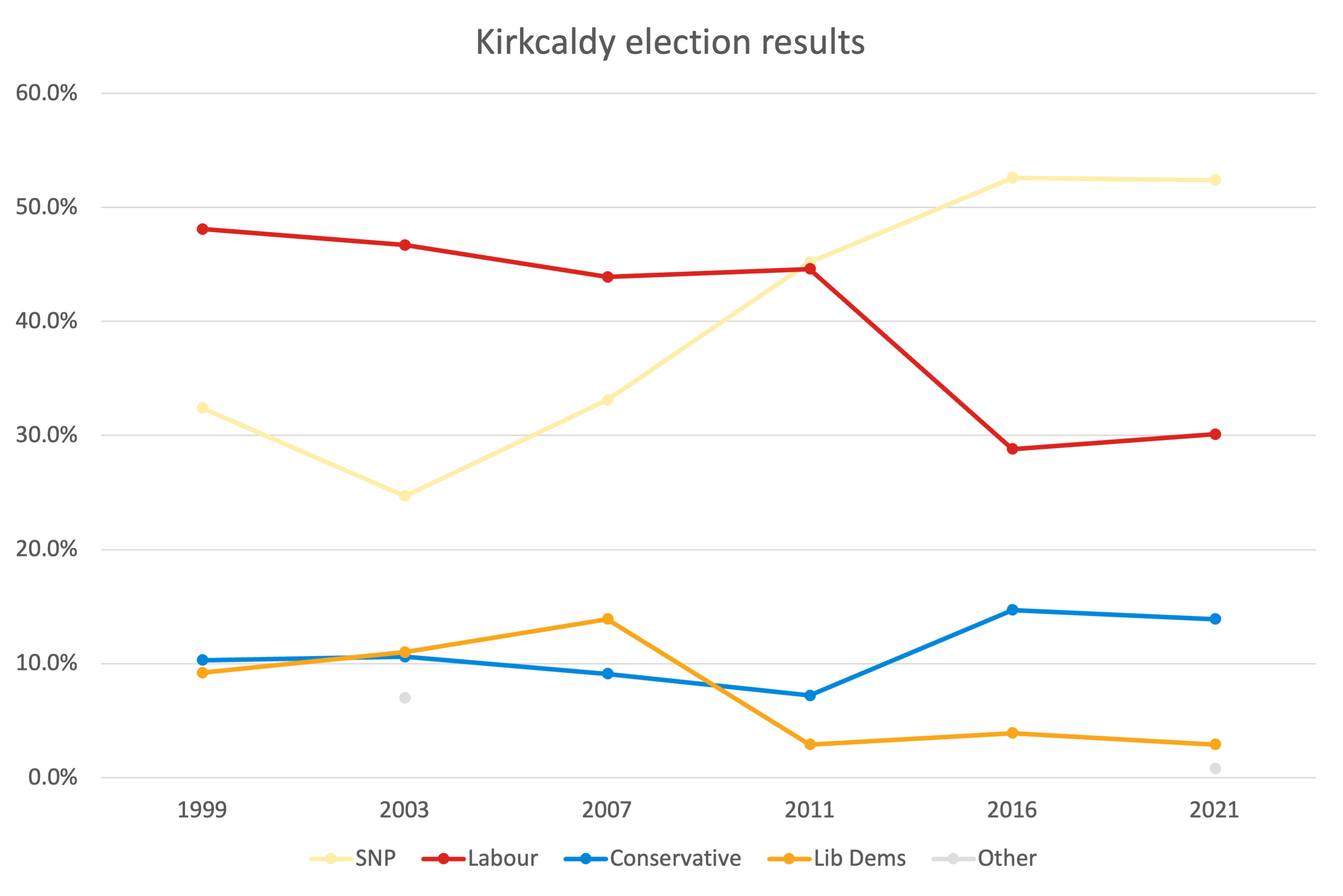
Kirkcaldy election results 1999-2021

=== 2020s ===
2026 Scottish Parliament election: Kirkcaldy
Party	Candidate	Constituency			Regional		
Party	Candidate	Votes	%	±%	Votes	%	±%
SNP	David Torrance (Note: Incumbent member for this constituency)	12,230	43.3	▼9.1	8,885	31.3	▼13.2
Labour Co-op	Claire Baker (Note: Baker is standing on a joint ticket on behalf of Scottish Labour and the Scottish Co-operative Party.) (Note: Incumbent member on the party list, or for another constituency)	7,483	26.5	▼3.6	6,159	21.7	▼1.4
Reform	Julie MacDougall (Note: Elected on the party list)	5,484	19.4	New	5,471	19.3	▲19.1
Green					3,294	11.6	▲4.5
Liberal Democrats	Fraser Graham	1,607	5.7	▲2.8	1,614	5.7	▲2.8
Conservative	Heather Greig	1,445	5.1	▼8.8	1,834	6.5	▼10.9
AtLS					295	1.0	▲1.0
Independent Green Voice					269	0.9	▲0.9
ISP					195	0.7	▲0.7
Scottish Family					171	0.6	▲0.1
Scottish Socialist					104	0.4	▲0.4
Advance UK					74	0.3	▲0.3
Scottish Libertarian					37	0.1	▼0.1
Majority		4,747	16.8	▼5.5			
Valid votes		28,249			28,402		
Invalid votes		142			78		
Turnout		28,391	45.5	▼12.3	28,480	45.6	▼12.2
SNP hold		Swing					
Notes

2021 Scottish Parliament election: Kirkcaldy
Party	Candidate	Constituency			Regional		
Party	Candidate	Votes	%	±%	Votes	%	±%
SNP	David Torrance (Note: Incumbent member for this constituency)	18,417	52.4	▼0.2	15,733	44.5	▼3.3
Labour	Claire Baker (Note: Incumbent member on the party list, or for another constituency)	10,586	30.1	▲1.3	8,145	23.1	▼2.0
Conservative	Kathleen Leslie	4,891	13.9	▼0.8	6,137	17.4	▲1.7
Green					2,488	7.1	▲2.4
Liberal Democrats	Alan Beal	1,015	2.9	▼1.0	1,027	2.9	▼0.3
Alba					689	2.0	New
All for Unity					406	1.1	New
Scottish Family					166	0.5	New
Freedom Alliance (UK)					123	0.3	New
Abolish the Scottish Parliament					114	0.3	New
Scottish Libertarian	Calum Paul	269	0.8	N/A	83	0.2	0.0
Reform					72	0.3	New
UKIP					57	0.2	▼2.0
Independent	Martin Keatings				27	0.1	New
Renew					7	0.0	New
Independent	Mercy Kamanja				4	0.0	New
Majority		7,831	22.3	▼1.5			
Valid votes		35,178			35,278		
Invalid votes		137			74		
Turnout		35,315	57.8	▲5.3	35,352	57.8	▲5.3
SNP hold		Swing					

=== 2010s ===
2016 Scottish Parliament election: Kirkcaldy
Party	Candidate	Constituency			Region		
Party	Candidate	Votes	%	±%	Votes	%	±%
SNP	David Torrance (Note: Incumbent member for this constituency)	16,358	52.6	▲7.4	14,934	47.8	▲3.7
Labour	Claire Baker (Note: Incumbent member on the party list, or for another constituency)	8,963	28.8	▼15.8	7,822	25.1	▼11.0
Conservative	Martin Laidlaw	4,568	14.7	▲7.5	4,914	15.7	▲9.1
Green					1,479	4.7	▲2.1
Liberal Democrats	Lauren Jones	1,219	3.9	▲1.0	1,001	3.2	▲1.0
UKIP					682	2.2	▲1.1
Solidarity					194	0.6	▲0.5
RISE					115	0.4	New
Scottish Libertarian					81	0.3	New
Majority		7,395	23.8	▲23.2			
Valid votes		31,108			31,222		
Invalid votes		159			52		
Turnout		31,267	52.5	▲6.0	31,274	52.5	▲5.9
SNP hold		Swing		▲11.6			
Notes

2011 Scottish Parliament election: Kirkcaldy
Party	Candidate	Constituency			Region		
Party	Candidate	Votes	%	±%	Votes	%	±%
SNP	David Torrance	12,579	45.2	N/A	12,319	44.1	N/A
Labour	Marilyn Livingstone (Note: Incumbent member for this constituency)	12,397	44.6	N/A	10,084	36.1	N/A
Conservative	Ian McFarlane	2,007	7.2	N/A	1,835	6.6	N/A
Independent	Andrew Roger				717	2.6	N/A
Green					713	2.6	N/A
Liberal Democrats	John Mainland	820	2.9	N/A	611	2.2	N/A
All-Scotland Pensioners Party					547	2.0	N/A
UKIP					315	1.1	N/A
BNP					252	0.9	N/A
Socialist Labour					241	0.9	N/A
Scottish Socialist					117	0.4	N/A
Scottish Christian					75	0.3	N/A
CPA					50	0.2	N/A
Solidarity					32	0.1	N/A
Majority		182	0.6	N/A			
Valid votes		27,803			27,908		
Invalid votes		119			94		
Turnout		27,922	46.5	N/A	28,002	46.6	N/A
SNP win (new boundaries)							

=== 2000s ===
2007 Scottish Parliament election: Kirkcaldy
Party	Candidate	Votes	%	±%
Labour	Marilyn Livingstone	10,627	43.9	−2.8
SNP	Chris Harvie	8,005	33.1	+8.4
Liberal Democrats	Alice Soper	3,361	13.9	+2.9
Conservative	David Potts	2,202	9.1	−1.5
Majority		2,622	10.8	−11.2
Turnout		24,195	47.7	+3.5
Labour hold		Swing	-5.6	

2003 Scottish Parliament election: Kirkcaldy
Party	Candidate	Votes	%	±%
Labour	Marilyn Livingstone	10,235	46.7	−1.5
SNP	Colin Welsh	5,411	24.7	−7.6
Liberal Democrats	Alex Cole-Hamilton	2,417	11.0	+1.8
Conservative	Mike Scott-Hayward	2,332	10.6	+0.3
Scottish Socialist	Rudi Vogels	1,544	7.0	New
Majority		4,824	22.0	+4.2
Turnout		21,939	44.2	
Labour hold		Swing	-4.6	

=== 1990s ===
1999 Scottish Parliament election: Kirkcaldy
Party	Candidate	Votes	%	±%
Labour	Marilyn Livingstone	13,645	48.14	N/A
SNP	Stewart Hosie	9,170	32.35	N/A
Conservative	Mike Scott-Hayward	2,907	10.26	N/A
Liberal Democrats	John Mainland	2,620	9.24	N/A
Majority		4,475	15.79	N/A
Turnout		28,342		N/A
Labour win (new seat)				

== Footnotes ==
=== Bibliography ===
- "Second Review of Scottish Parliament Boundaries: Report to Scottish Ministers" (PDF). Boundaries Scotland. April 2025.
