= Marilyn Livingstone =

Scottish politician (born 1952)

Member of the Scottish Parliament for Kirkcaldy
- In office 6 May 1999 – 22 March 2011
- Preceded by: new constituency
- Succeeded by: David Torrance

Personal details
- Born: 30 September 1952 (age 73)
- Party: Labour Co-operative

Marilyn Livingstone (born 30 September 1952) is a Scottish Labour Co-operative politician, who served as the Member of the Scottish Parliament (MSP) for Kirkcaldy constituency from 1999 to 2011.

Before her election in 1999 she was the head of the Business School at Fife College. She was also a councillor on Kirkcaldy District Council and Fife Council. She won re-election from the Kirkcaldy constituency in the 2003 and 2007 elections,

In the 2011 election she was unsuccessful, losing to the Scottish National Party's David Torrance by 182 votes.

== Electoral history ==
2011 Scottish Parliament election: Kirkcaldy
Party	Candidate	Votes	%	±%
SNP	David Torrance	12,579	45.2	+11.9
Labour	Marilyn Livingstone	12,397	44.6	−0.5
Conservative	Ian McFarlane	2,007	7.2	−1.3
Liberal Democrats	John Mainland	820	2.9	−10.1
Majority		182	0.7	
Turnout		27,803	46.0	
SNP gain from Labour		Swing	+6.2	

2007 Scottish Parliament election: Kirkcaldy
Party	Candidate	Votes	%	±%
Labour	Marilyn Livingstone	10,627	43.9	−2.8
SNP	Chris Harvie	8,005	33.1	+8.4
Liberal Democrats	Alice Soper	3,361	13.9	+2.9
Conservative	David Potts	2,202	9.1	−1.5
Majority		2,622	10.8	
Turnout		24,195	47.7	
Labour hold		Swing	-5.6%	

2003 Scottish Parliament election: Kirkcaldy
Party	Candidate	Votes	%	±%
Labour	Marilyn Livingstone	10,235	46.7	−1.5
SNP	Colin Welsh	5,411	24.7	−7.7
Liberal Democrats	Alex Cole-Hamilton	2,417	11.0	+1.8
Conservative	Mike Scott-Hayward	2,332	10.6	+0.4
Scottish Socialist	Rudi Vogels	1,544	7.0	+7.0
Majority		4,824	22.0	N/A
Turnout		21,939	44.2	
Labour hold		Swing	-4.6%	

1999 Scottish Parliament election: Kirkcaldy
Party	Candidate	Votes	%	±%
Labour	Marilyn Livingstone	13,645	48.14	N/A
SNP	Stewart Hosie	9,170	32.35	N/A
Conservative	Mike Scott-Hayward	2,907	10.26	N/A
Liberal Democrats	John Mainland	2,620	9.24	N/A
Majority		4,475	15.79	N/A
Turnout		28,342		
Labour hold		Swing	N/A	

Scottish Parliament
New parliament Scotland Act 1998	Member of the Scottish Parliament for Kirkcaldy; 1999–2011	Succeeded by David Torrance
