= Nick Henderson =

British activist

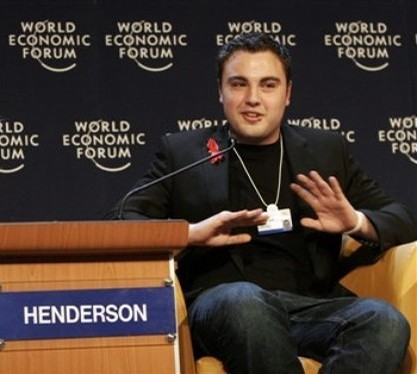
- Henderson at the World Economic Forum in 2008

Nick Henderson is a British LGBT rights activist. He was prominent in the campaign that resulted in the Marriage and Civil Partnership (Scotland) Act 2014, which recognised same-sex marriage in Scotland.

== Advocacy work ==
Henderson has spoken at numerous public forums and events, including as a panellist at the 2008 World Economic Forum in Davos. He has blogged at the Huffington Post and regularly contributes to an LGBT themed blog, OutFrontUK. He has appeared on radio and television to discuss LGBT issues, such as on the controversy surrounding the 2008 comments made by the Pope on gay and transgender people.

In 2009 he was named runner up Scottish Young Thinker of the Year by the Institute of Contemporary Scotland for a paper he presented on the need for open primaries, a directly elected Prime Minister and a written constitution for the UK. Henderson was also appointed as a Youth Commissioner on Alcohol in 2009, which has a mandate from the Scottish Government to investigate and report on the relationship between young people and alcohol in Scotland.

== Same-sex marriage ==
In January 2009, Nick Henderson, as director of the LGBT Network, raised a petition (PE 1239) in the Scottish Parliament that called for the legalisation of civil marriage for same sex couples, and religious marriage where the religious body consents. It was accepted by the Petitions Committee and currently the Committee are considering the issue, along with the evidence submitted by faith groups, advocacy groups and the Scottish Government. It will discuss the petition again on 1 December.

Scottish Nationalist MSP Shirley-Anne Somerville is the strongest supporter of the petition in the Parliament. UK same sex marriage advocates Celia Kitzinger and Sue Wilkinson have also given their backing to the movement in Scotland.

On 14 February 2014, the same-sex marriage bill was passed by the Scottish government over five years after Henderson launched the petition in Parliament.

== See also ==
- Same-sex marriage in the United Kingdom
