= John Park (politician) =

Scottish Labour Party politician (born 1973)

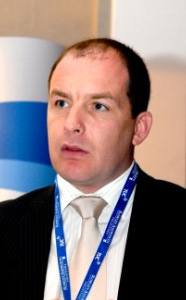
- Park in 2011

Member of the Scottish Parliament for Mid Scotland and Fife (1 of 7 Regional MSPs)
- In office 3 May 2007 – 7 December 2012
- Preceded by: Tricia Marwick
- Succeeded by: Jayne Baxter

Personal details
- Born: 14 September 1973 (age 53) Dunfermline, Scotland
- Party: Scottish Labour Party
- Education: Woodmill High School, Scotland

John William Park (born 14 September 1973) is a former Scottish Labour Party politician. He was elected as a Member of the Scottish Parliament (MSP) for the Mid Scotland and Fife electoral region in May 2007. Park was re-elected in 2011, but resigned his seat with effect from 7 December 2012 and was succeeded by Jayne Baxter. He was educated at Woodmill High School in Dunfermline, Scotland.

== Career ==
Park was formerly a trade union official working for Unite (formerly Amicus and the Amalgamated Engineering and Electrical Union) and the Scottish TUC. He started working in Rosyth Dockyard in 1989 as an electrical apprentice. He became active in the Dockyard's influential trade unions during the Trident refitting campaign in the early 1990s. After becoming a shop steward he was elected the Dockyard's youngest ever full-time trade union convenor in 1998.

After resigning from his seat in the Scottish Parliament on 7 December 2012, he took up the position of Director of Policy and Strategy with Community trade union until 2017, when he joined the Amazon Public Policy team as Head of labour and skills policy in Europe. In 2021, Park was appointed Head of Government Affairs and Public Policy for Google Cloud in the UK & Ireland.

== Member of the Scottish Parliament ==
Park was appointed the Labour Party's Skills spokesperson following the election of Wendy Alexander as leader in September 2007 and quickly established a campaign to increase the number of apprentices in Scotland. He was appointed in September 2008 to Iain Gray's Shadow Cabinet as the Shadow Minister for Economy and Skills. Tipped as a future leader, Park also held other senior roles in the Scottish Labour’s Shadow Cabinet, including leading on campaigns strategy and Chief Whip. Park won the Scottish Politician of the year, “One to Watch" award in 2008 following his campaigning efforts on employment issues and driving an increase in apprenticeship opportunities by the Scottish Government.

Park resigned his seat on 7 December 2012, to take up a position with the Community trades union. He was replaced by the next available Labour candidate from the Mid Scotland and Fife list, Fife Councillor Jayne Baxter (Cowdenbeath).

Trade union offices
New title	Assistant General Secretary of Community; 2013 – July 2017	Incumbent
