= David Torrance (politician) =

Scottish National Party politician

David Torrance MSP
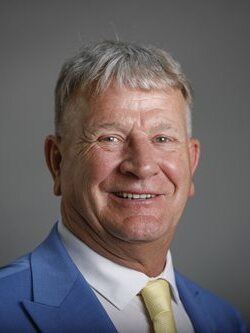
- Official Portrait, 2026

Member of the Scottish Parliament for Kirkcaldy
- Incumbent
- Assumed office 5 May 2011
- Preceded by: Marilyn Livingstone
- Majority: 4,747 (16.8%)

Personal details
- Born: 13 March 1961 (age 65) Kirkcaldy, Fife, Scotland
- Party: Scottish National Party

David Herd Torrance (born 13 March 1961) is a Scottish National Party (SNP) politician. He has been the Member of the Scottish Parliament (MSP) for the Kirkcaldy constituency since 2011.

== Background ==
Born in Kirkcaldy, David Torrance was educated at Balwearie High School and Adam Smith College, where he gained an HND Mechanical Engineering.

Torrance is a member of the Scout Association, and has been Scout Leader since 1979. He is also the Assistant District Commissioner for Kirkcaldy District Scouts.

== Career ==
Torrance joined the Scottish National Party in 1981 and was a Fife local Councillor in Fife Council from 1995 until being elected as an MSP in 2011.

He worked for British Gas, Alcan Chemicals, and Bosch Rexroth before going into politics full-time in 2007, working for Christopher Harvie MSP.

== Electoral history ==
2021 Scottish Parliament election: Kirkcaldy
Party	Candidate	Votes	%	±%
SNP	David Torrance	18,417	52.4	−0.2
Labour	Claire Baker	10,586	30.1	+1.3
Conservative	Kathleen Leslie	4,891	13.9	−0.8
Liberal Democrats	Alan Beal	1,015	2.9	−1.0
Scottish Libertarian	Calum Paul	269	0.8	New
Majority		7,831	22.3	−1.5
Turnout		35,315	57.8	+5.3
SNP hold		Swing		

2016 Scottish Parliament election: Kirkcaldy
Party	Candidate	Votes	%	±%
SNP	David Torrance	16,358	52.6	+7.3
Labour	Claire Baker	8,963	28.8	−15.8
Conservative	Martin Laidlaw	4,568	14.7	+7.5
Liberal Democrats	Lauren Jones	1,219	3.9	+1.0
Majority		7,395	23.8	
Turnout		31,108	52.3	
SNP hold		Swing	+11.6	

2011 Scottish Parliament election: Kirkcaldy
Party	Candidate	Votes	%	±%
SNP	David Torrance	12,579	45.2	+11.9
Labour	Marilyn Livingstone	12,397	44.6	−0.5
Conservative	Ian McFarlane	2,007	7.2	−1.3
Liberal Democrats	John Mainland	820	2.9	−10.1
Majority		182	0.7	
Turnout		27,803	46.0	
SNP gain from Labour		Swing	+6.2	

Scottish Parliament
Preceded by Marilyn Livingstone	Member of the Scottish Parliament for Kirkcaldy; 2011–present	Incumbent
