= Jim Tolson =

Scottish politician

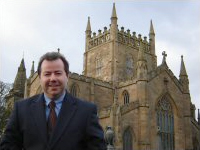
- Tolson in 2007

Member of the Scottish Parliament for Dunfermline West
- In office 3 May 2007 – 22 March 2011
- Preceded by: Scott Barrie
- Succeeded by: Bill Walker

Personal details
- Born: James Tolson; 26 May 1965 (age 60) Kirkcaldy, Scotland
- Party: Scottish Liberal Democrats
- Website: http://www.jimtolson.com

James "Jim" Tolson (born 26 May 1965) is a Scottish Liberal Democrat politician, and a former Member of the Scottish Parliament (MSP) for Dunfermline West from 2007 until 2011.

Prior to his election as an MSP, he was a Fife councillor and employee of Sky Subscriber Services Ltd in Dunfermline. In 2005, Tolson won a case against Sky at an employment tribunal seeking more time off to carry out council duties.

Tolson's seat was abolished in the 2011 Scottish Parliament election and he contested the new Dunfermline constituency but lost to the Scottish National Party's Bill Walker.

Scottish Parliament
Preceded by Scott Barrie	Member of the Scottish Parliament for Dunfermline West; 2007–2011	Succeeded by Bill Walker as MSP for Dunfermline
