= Claire Baker =

Scottish Labour politician (born 1971)

Claire Baker MSP
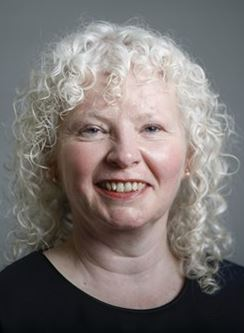
- Official portrait, 2026

Member of the Scottish Parliament for Mid Scotland and Fife (1 of 7 Regional MSPs)
- Incumbent
- Assumed office 3 May 2007

Scottish Labour portfolios
- 2014–2016: Shadow Cabinet Secretary for Culture, Tourism and External Affairs
- 2016–2017: Shadow Cabinet Secretary for Justice
- 2017–2023: Shadow Cabinet Secretary for Culture

Personal details
- Born: Claire Josephine Brennan; 4 March 1971 (age 55) Dunfermline, Scotland
- Party: Scottish Labour Co-operative
- Spouse: Richard Baker

Claire Josephine Baker (née Brennan; born 4 March 1971) is a Scottish Labour and Co-operative politician who has served as a Member of the Scottish Parliament (MSP) for the Mid Scotland and Fife region since 2007.

== Early life and career ==
Claire Baker was born on 4 March 1971 in Dunfermline to Margaret (née Edgar) and James Brennan. She grew up in Kelty, and attended primary and secondary schools in Fife. She studied for an MA (Hons) in English Language and Literature at the University of Edinburgh and in 1997 was awarded a PhD from the University of Glasgow.

== Career ==
Baker worked in a variety of research and policy posts. This included working as a Research Officer for the Scottish Parliamentary Labour Group from 1999 to 2002, Research Officer for the trade union Amicus from 2002 to 2004, and as Research and Information Manager at the Royal College of Nursing, Scotland from 2004 to 2005. Immediately prior to being elected to the Scottish Parliament, she was Policy Manager for the Scottish Council for Voluntary Organisations, the umbrella body for charities and community and voluntary organisations in Scotland.

In May 2007 she was elected for the Mid Scotland and Fife region.

In the 2011 election, Baker contested the seat of Mid Fife and Glenrothes but lost to the SNP's Tricia Marwick, who subsequently resigned from the SNP to become the Scottish Parliament Presiding Officer. However, she was successfully returned to the Scottish Parliament as 2nd on Labour's Mid Scotland and Fife regional list.

In the Holyrood election of 2016, Baker unsuccessfully stood in the Kirkcaldy constituency and was defeated by David Torrance of the Scottish National Party, suffering a swing against Labour of 15.8%. She was subsequently returned to the Scottish Parliament as a member for Mid Scotland and Fife on the regional list as Labour's 2nd place candidate.

At the 2021 Scottish Parliament election Baker was supported as a Labour Co-operative candidate for the first time. She contested the constituency seat of Kirkcaldy but was returned to Parliament as a regional list member for Mid Scotland and Fife again.

In 2011 she was Labour's Shadow Minister for Education in the Scottish Parliament and the Deputy Convener of the Education and Culture Committee. She later served on the Scottish Labour front bench as spokesperson for Rural Affairs and Environment (2011–2014), Culture, Europe and External Affairs (2014–2015), and Democracy (covering "constitution, Europe, culture and power in society") (2015–2016). Having served as Scottish Labour's spokesperson on Justice, Baker is currently Shadow Secretary for Culture, Tourism, Europe and External Affairs.

Baker nominated Anas Sarwar in the 2021 Scottish Labour leadership election.

Baker backed the UK Government’s decision to introduce means-testing for the Winter Fuel Payment, voting in the Scottish Parliament against calls to reverse the decision.

She was re-elected list MSP in the 2026 Scottish Parliament election.

== Personal life ==
In 2004 she married Richard Baker, who was formerly an MSP for North East Scotland. The couple have one daughter. In 1998, Baker published a Critical Guide to the Poetry of Sylvia Plath.
