= Scott Barrie =

Scottish politician (born 1962)

Member of the Scottish Parliament for Dunfermline West
- In office 6 May 1999 – 2 April 2007
- Preceded by: New Parliament
- Succeeded by: Jim Tolson

Personal details
- Born: 10 March 1962 (age 64) St Andrews, Scotland
- Party: Scottish Labour Party
- Education: University of Edinburgh; University of Stirling; University of Dundee

Scott Barrie (born 10 March 1962, St Andrews) is a Scottish Labour Party politician and former social worker. He was the Member of the Scottish Parliament (MSP) for Dunfermline West from 1999 to 2007, where he was a member of the Communities Committees of the Parliament.

Prior to being elected to the Scottish Parliament, Scott was employed by Fife Council in the social work department. He also represented the Dunfermline Central ward on Dunfermline District Council.

Scott is a graduate of the University of Edinburgh (MA), the University of Stirling (CQSW) and the University of Dundee (Diploma in Child Protection Studies).

He was appointed the Chief Whip for the Labour Party group of MSPs at Holyrood after the 2003 election. On 8 February 2007 he resigned from this role in order to vote against the Scottish Executive. Barrie wished to see the abolition of tolls on the Forth Road Bridge and Tay Road Bridge.

Scottish Parliament
New parliament Scotland Act 1998	Member of the Scottish Parliament for Dunfermline West; 1999–2007	Succeeded by Jim Tolson
