= Jayne Baxter =

Scottish politician (born 1955)

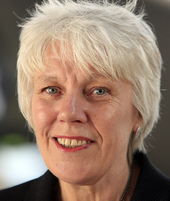
- Baxter in 2012

Member of the Scottish Parliament for Mid Scotland and Fife (1 of 7 Regional MSPs)
- In office 7 December 2012 – 24 March 2016
- Preceded by: John Park

Personal details
- Born: 5 November 1955 (age 70)
- Party: Scottish Labour Party
- Education: Edinburgh Napier University

Jayne Baxter (born 5 November 1955) is a Scottish Labour Party politician. She was a Member of the Scottish Parliament (MSP) for the Mid Scotland and Fife region from 2012 to 2016. She succeeded John Park when he resigned his list seat to take up a position with the Community trades union.

A lifelong resident of Fife, she graduated from Edinburgh Napier University in 1995. She currently serves as constituency agent for Mid Scotland and Fife MSP Alex Rowley.

Baxter was Labour's second candidate on the Scotland constituency list in the 2019 European Parliament election.
