= Fife North East (Scottish Parliament constituency) =

Region or constituency of the Scottish Parliament

- County constituency for the Scottish Parliament
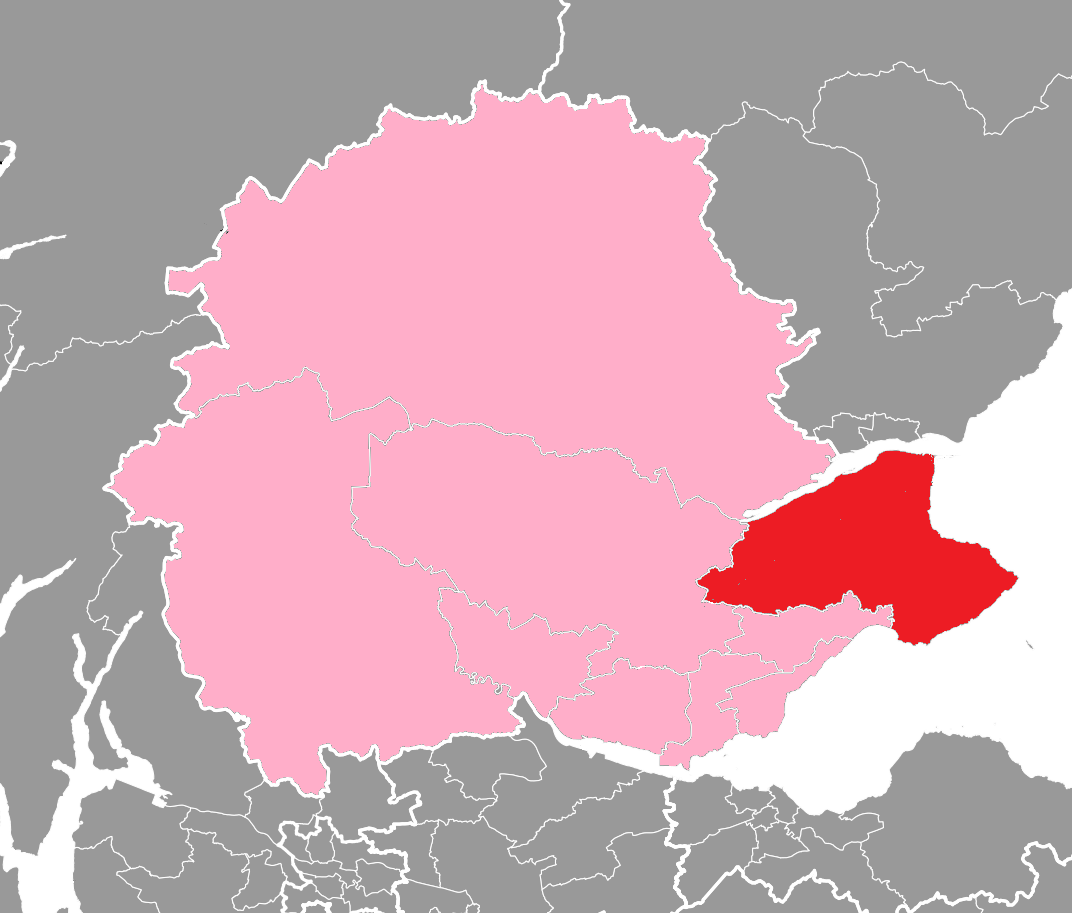

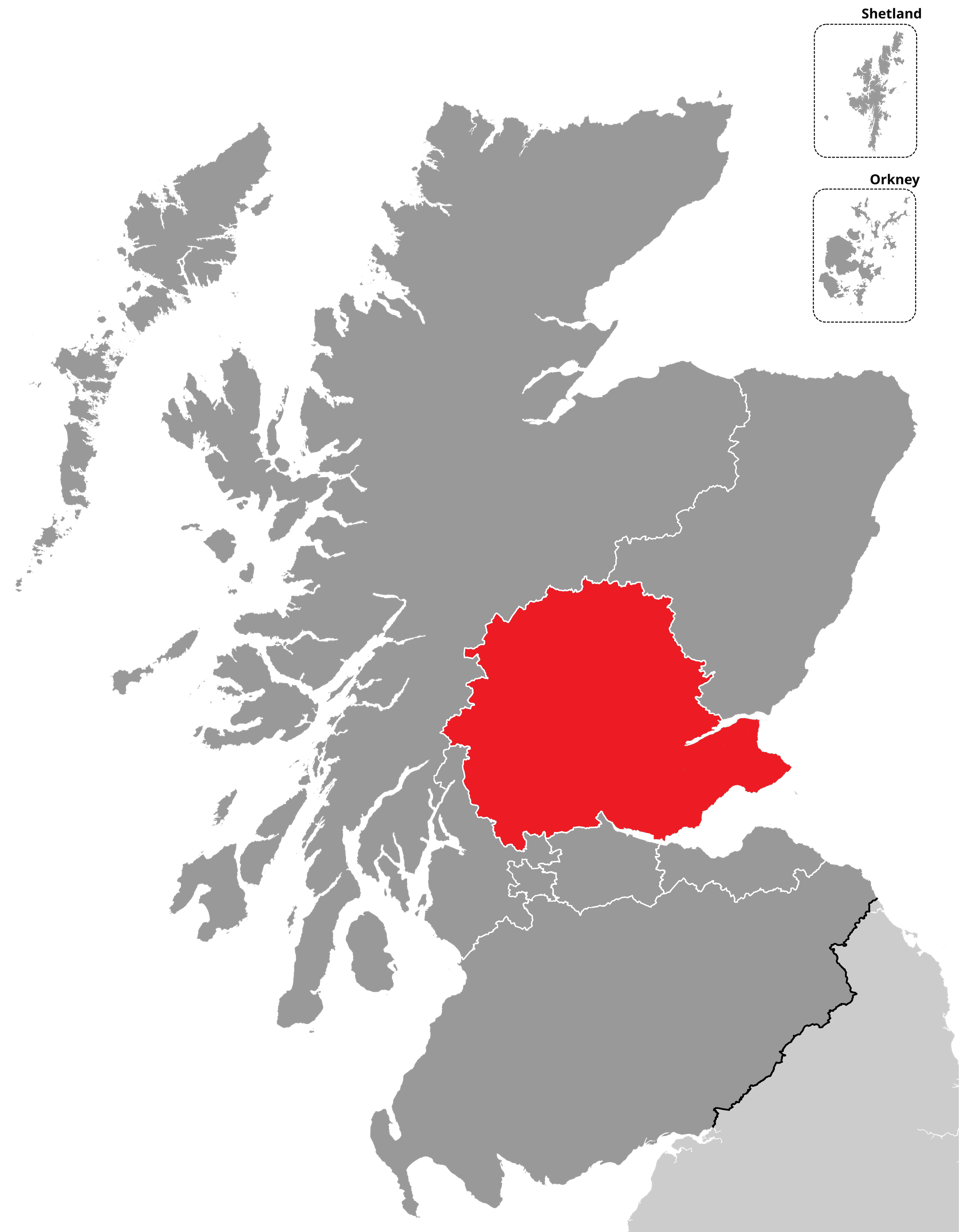
- Fife North East shown within the Mid Scotland and Fife electoral region and the region shown within Scotland
- Electoral region: Mid Scotland and Fife
- Electorate: 57,352 (2026)

Current constituency
- Created: 1999
- Party: Scottish Liberal Democrats
- MSP: Willie Rennie
- Council area: Fife

Fife North East is a county constituency of the Scottish Parliament covering part of the council area of Fife. It elects one Member of the Scottish Parliament (MSP) by the first past the post method of election. Under the additional-member electoral system used for elections to the Scottish Parliament, it is also one of nine constituencies in the Mid Scotland and Fife electoral region, which elects seven additional members, in addition to the nine constituency MSPs, to produce a form of proportional representation for the region as a whole. Prior to the second periodic review of Scottish Parliament boundaries in 2025, the constituency was known as North East Fife; the name was changed to avoid confusion with the North East Fife constituency of the UK Parliament.

The seat has been held since the 2016 Scottish Parliament election by Willie Rennie, the former leader of the Scottish Liberal Democrats.

== Electoral region ==
The other eight constituencies of the Mid Scotland and Fife region are: Clackmannanshire and Dunblane, Dunfermline, Cowdenbeath, Kirkcaldy, Mid Fife and Glenrothes, Perthshire North, Perthshire South and Kinross-shire and Stirling. The region covers all of the Clackmannanshire council area, all of the Fife council area, all of the Perth and Kinross council area and all of the Stirling council area.

== Constituency boundaries and council area ==
Map of boundaries from 2011

The seat is one of five representing Fife in the Scottish Parliament with the other four being Cowdenbeath, Dunfermline, Kirkcaldy, and Mid Fife and Glenrothes.

The constituency was created at the same time as the Scottish Parliament, for the 1999 Scottish Parliament election, using the name and boundaries of the pre-existing North East Fife constituency of the House of Commons constituency. Since the 2005 United Kingdom general election, UK and Scottish parliamentary constituencies have diverged, and there is no longer any link between the two sets of boundaries, although they continued to share a name. The boundaries of the Scottish Parliament seat were themselves reviewed ahead of the 2011 Scottish Parliament election as part of the first periodic review of Scottish Parliament boundaries. The following electoral wards of Fife Council were used to define the North East Fife constituency at this review:

- Cupar
- East Neuk and Landward
- Howe of Fife and Tay Coast
- St Andrews
- Tay Bridgehead

At the second periodic review of Scottish Parliament boundaries in 2025 the seat boundaries were unchanged, however from the 2026 Scottish Parliament election onwards the constituency has been renamed to Fife North East to avoid confusion with the North East Fife constituency of the UK Parliament.

== Member of the Scottish Parliament ==
Election	Member	Party
1999	Iain Smith	Liberal Democrats
2011	Roderick Campbell	SNP
2016	Willie Rennie	Liberal Democrats

== Election results ==
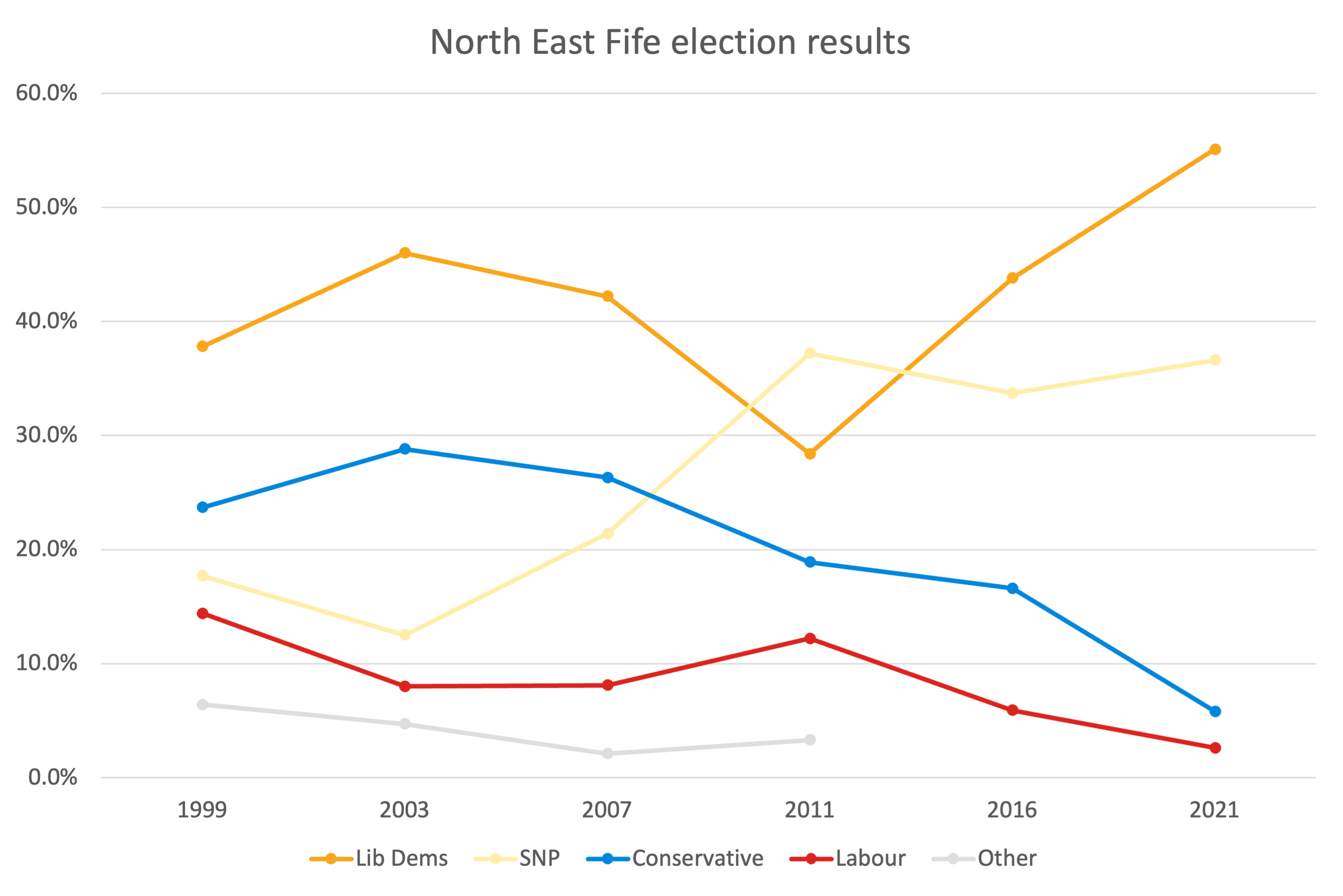
North East Fife election results 1999-2021

=== 2020s ===
2026 Scottish Parliament election: Fife North East
Party	Candidate	Constituency			Regional		
Party	Candidate	Votes	%	±%	Votes	%	±%
Liberal Democrats	Willie Rennie (Note: Incumbent member for this constituency)	21,350	63.7	▲8.6	13,915	41.4	▲12.3
SNP	John Beare	7,876	23.5	▼13.1	6,444	19.2	▼11.7
Green					4,352	13.0	▲2.9
Reform	William Docherty	2,524	7.5	New	3,609	10.7	New
Conservative	Edward Sheasby	936	2.8	▼3.0	2,552	7.6	▼12.5
Labour	Elizabeth Carr-Ellis	818	2.4	▼0.2	1,739	5.2	▼0.8
AtLS					246	0.7	New
Independent Green Voice					204	0.6	New
Scottish Family					199	0.6	▲0.1
ISP					127	0.4	New
Scottish Socialist					83	0.2	New
Scottish Libertarian					80	0.2	▼0.1
Advance UK					38	0.1	New
Majority		13,474	40.2	▲21.7			
Valid votes		33,504			33,588		
Invalid votes		120			61		
Turnout		33,624	58.6	▼10.3	33,649	58.7	▼10.2
Liberal Democrats hold		Swing		▲29.4			
Notes

2021 Scottish Parliament election: North East Fife
Party	Candidate	Constituency			Regional		
Party	Candidate	Votes	%	±%	Votes	%	±%
Liberal Democrats	Willie Rennie (Note: Incumbent member for this constituency)	22,163	55.1	▲11.2	11,728	29.1	▲2.5
SNP	Rhuaraidh Fleming	14,715	36.6	▲2.9	12,484	30.9	▼0.9
Conservative	Rhona Metcalfe	2,323	5.8	▼10.8	8,108	20.1	▼4.1
Green					4,068	10.1	▲2.3
Labour	Wendy Hayes	1,056	2.6	▼3.3	2,425	6.0	▼1.1
Alba					585	1.4	New
All for Unity					303	0.8	New
Scottish Family					214	0.5	New
Scottish Libertarian					111	0.3	▼0.1
Abolish the Scottish Parliament					110	0.3	New
Freedom Alliance (UK)					73	0.2	New
Reform					71	0.2	New
UKIP					35	0.1	▼1.5
Independent	Martin Keatings				32	0.1	New
Renew					11	0.0	New
Independent	Mercy Kamanja				5	0.0	New
Majority		7,448	18.5	▲8.4			
Valid votes		40,257			40,363		
Invalid votes		159			53		
Turnout		40,416	68.9	▲5.7	40,416	68.9	▲5.7
Liberal Democrats hold		Swing		▲7.1			

=== 2010s ===
2016 Scottish Parliament election: North East Fife
Party	Candidate	Constituency			Regional		
Party	Candidate	Votes	%	±%	Votes	%	±%
Liberal Democrats	Willie Rennie (Note: Incumbent member on the party list, or for another constituency)	14,928	43.8	▲15.4	9,054	26.5	▲9.3
SNP	Roderick Campbell (Note: Incumbent member for this constituency)	11,463	33.7	▼3.5	10,860	31.8	▼7.5
Conservative	Huw Bell	5,646	16.6	▼2.3	8,260	24.2	▲5.7
Green					2,665	7.8	▲0.5
Labour	Rosalind Garton	2,026	5.9	▼6.3	2,427	7.1	▼4.7
UKIP					553	1.6	▼1.3
Scottish Libertarian					139	0.4	New
RISE					102	0.3	New
Solidarity					71	0.2	▲0.1
Majority		3,465	10.1	N/A			
Valid votes		34,063			34,131		
Invalid votes		101			48		
Turnout		34,164	63.2	▲12.5	34,179	63.2	▲12.5
Liberal Democrats gain from SNP		Swing		▲8.4			
Notes

2011 Scottish Parliament election: North East Fife
Party	Candidate	Constituency			Region		
Party	Candidate	Votes	%	±%	Votes	%	±%
SNP	Roderick Campbell	11,029	37.2	N/A	11,699	39.3	N/A
Liberal Democrats	Iain Smith (Note: Incumbent member for this constituency)	8,437	28.4	N/A	5,120	17.2	N/A
Conservative	Miles Briggs	5,618	18.9	N/A	5,507	18.5	N/A
Labour	Colin Davidson	3,613	12.2	N/A	3,503	11.8	N/A
Green					2,188	7.4	N/A
UKIP	Mike Scott-Hayward	979	3.3	N/A	565	1.9	N/A
Scottish Senior Citizens					487	1.6	N/A
BNP					166	0.6	N/A
Independent	Andrew Roger				133	0.4	N/A
Socialist Labour					83	0.3	N/A
Scottish Socialist					127	0.4	N/A
CPA					85	0.3	N/A
Scottish Christian					63	0.2	N/A
Solidarity					23	0.1	N/A
Majority		2,592	8.8	N/A			
Valid votes		29,676			29,749		
Invalid votes		156			112		
Turnout		29,835	50.7	N/A	29,861	50.7	N/A
SNP win (new boundaries)							

=== 2000s ===
2007 Scottish Parliament election: North East Fife
Party	Candidate	Votes	%	±%
Liberal Democrats	Iain Smith	13,307	42.2	−3.8
Conservative	Ted Brocklebank	8,291	26.3	−2.5
SNP	Roderick Campbell	6,735	21.4	+8.9
Labour	Kenny Young	2,557	8.1	+0.1
Independent	Tony Campbell	662	2.1	New
Majority		5,016	15.9	−1.3
Turnout		31,552	51.7	+1.8
Liberal Democrats hold		Swing	-0.7	

2003 Scottish Parliament election: North East Fife
Party	Candidate	Votes	%	±%
Liberal Democrats	Iain Smith	13,479	46.0	+7.2
Conservative	Ted Brocklebank	8,424	28.8	+5.1
SNP	Capre Ross-Williams	3,660	12.5	−6.2
Labour	Gregor Poynton	2,353	8.0	−6.4
Scottish Socialist	Carlo Morelli	1,366	4.7	New
Majority		5,055	17.2	+3.1
Turnout		29,282	49.9	−8.5
Liberal Democrats hold		Swing	+6.5	

=== 1990s ===
1999 Scottish Parliament election: North East Fife
Party	Candidate	Votes	%	±%
Liberal Democrats	Iain Smith	13,590	37.8	N/A
Conservative	Ted Brocklebank	8,526	23.7	N/A
SNP	Colin Welsh	6,373	17.7	N/A
Labour	Charles Milne	5,175	14.4	N/A
Independent	Donald MacGregor	1,540	4.3	N/A
Independent	Robert Beveridge	737	2.1	N/A
Majority		5,064	14.1	N/A
Turnout		35,941	58.4	N/A
Liberal Democrats win (new seat)				

== See also ==
- North East Fife (UK Parliament constituency)
