= Iain Smith (Scottish politician) =

British politician (born 1960)

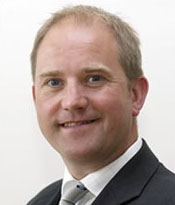

Member of the Scottish Parliament for North East Fife
- In office 6 May 1999 – 22 March 2011
- Preceded by: new constituency
- Succeeded by: Roderick Campbell
- Majority: 5,016 (15.9%)

Personal details
- Born: 1 May 1960 (age 66) Gateside, Scotland
- Party: Scottish Liberal Democrats
- Education: Newcastle University

Iain Smith (born 1 May 1960) is a Scottish Liberal Democrat politician. He was the Member of the Scottish Parliament (MSP) for the North East Fife constituency from 1999 until his defeat at 2011 election by the SNP's Rod Campbell.

== Education ==
Smith was educated at Bell Baxter High School in Cupar, Fife, before reading Politics and Economics at Newcastle University.

== Early career ==
Prior to entering Holyrood, Smith worked for Northumberland County Council, managed an Advice Centre in Dundee and was Constituency Assistant to North East Fife MP, Sir Menzies Campbell. Simultaneously, he was a councillor and leader of the Liberal Democrats on Fife Council from 1986 to 1999.

== In Parliament ==
Smith was elected to the first Scottish Parliament in May 1999 to represent his home constituency of North East Fife and was appointed as Deputy Minister for Parliamentary Business in the government of First Minister Donald Dewar, a post he held until Dewar's death the following year.

He convened the Parliament's Procedures Committee from 2003 to 2005 when he was elected Convener of the Education Committee, a position he held until the 2007 Scottish Parliament election.

After the election Smith was appointed Scottish Liberal Democrat Spokesperson for Europe, External Affairs and Culture and was elected by his colleagues to Chair of the Scottish Liberal Democrat Parliamentary Party. In September 2008 he became Convener of the Scottish Parliament's influential Economy, Energy and Tourism Committee.

Between 2001 and 2011 he represented the Scottish Parliament as a member of the British–Irish Parliamentary Assembly.

== Personal life ==
Smith was one of four openly gay, lesbian or bisexual MSPs in the 2007–2011 Parliament, along with Scottish Green Party leader Patrick Harvie, former MSP Margaret Smith and Joe FitzPatrick.

For the past eight years, Smith has lived with his partner in Ladybank. He has a broad interest in sports; particularly cricket and football. He likes to travel widely and has a keen interest in culture.

Scottish Parliament
New parliament Scotland Act 1998	Member of the Scottish Parliament for North East Fife; 1999–2011	Incumbent
Preceded by Tavish Scott	Convener of the Energy, Economy and Tourism Committee; 2008–2011	Succeeded by ???
Preceded by Robert Brown	Convener of the Education Committee; 2005–2007	Succeeded by Karen Whitefield
Preceded by Murray Tosh	Convener of the Procedures Committee; 2003–2005	Succeeded by Donald Gorrie
Political offices
New office	Deputy Minister for Parliamentary Business; 1999–2000	Succeeded by Tavish Scott
