= Roderick Campbell =

Scottish politician (born 1953)

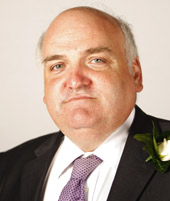

Member of the Scottish Parliament for North East Fife
- In office 5 May 2011 – 24 March 2016
- Preceded by: Iain Smith
- Succeeded by: Willie Rennie

Personal details
- Born: 15 June 1953 (age 73) Edinburgh, Scotland
- Party: Scottish National Party
- Education: Exeter University; University of Strathclyde
- Occupation: Advocate

Roderick Alexander McRobie Campbell (born 15 June 1953) is a retired Scottish National Party politician. He was the Member of the Scottish Parliament (MSP) for the North East Fife constituency from 2011 to 2016.

== Early life ==
Campbell was born on 15 June 1953 in Edinburgh. He was educated at Reading School and graduated from Exeter University with a BA (Hons) in Politics. He received a LL.M in Human Rights Law from the University of Strathclyde.

Campbell first qualified as a solicitor, in both England and Wales and Scotland, and rose to become partner in a multinational firm of lawyers based in London. In 2008, he was called to the bar in Scotland. He is a practising member of the Faculty of Advocates.

== Political career ==
Campbell joined the Scottish National Party in 1995.

Campbell stood for the North East Fife constituency at the 2005 and 2010 general elections, although he was unsuccessful and failed to unseat Menzies Campbell of the Liberal Democrats. Campbell also stood unsuccessfully at the 2007 Scottish Parliament election, where Iain Smith successfully retained the North East Fife seat.

At the 2011 Scottish Parliament election, Campbell beat Smith in the contest, and was elected as the MSP for North East Fife. As a MSP, he was a member of the European and External Relations Committee and the Justice Committee. At the 2016 Campbell finished second to Scottish Liberal Democrat leader Willie Rennie, and was not elected.
