= Christopher Harvie =

Scottish historian and politician (born 1944)

Prof Chris Harvie

Member of the Scottish Parliament for Mid Scotland and Fife
- In office 3 May 2007 – 22 March 2011

Personal details
- Born: 21 September 1944 (age 82) Motherwell, North Lanarkshire, Scotland
- Party: Labour (until 1988); SNP (since 1988)
- Spouse(s): Virginia Mary Roundell, born April 1944, died 26 February 2005
- Children: Alison Margaret Harvie, born August 1982
- Education: University of Edinburgh

Professor Christopher Harvie (born 21 September 1944, Motherwell) is a Scottish historian and a Scottish National Party (SNP) politician. He was a Member of the Scottish Parliament (MSP) for Mid Scotland and Fife from 2007 to 2011. Before his election, he was Professor of British and Irish Studies at the University of Tübingen, Germany.

== Life and career ==
Harvie grew up in the Borders village of St Boswells and was educated in Kelso at Kelso High School and in Edinburgh at Royal High School. He studied at the University of Edinburgh, where he graduated in 1966 with a First Class Honours M.A. in History. He received his PhD from Edinburgh in 1972 for a thesis on university liberalism and democracy, 1860–1886.

As a historian, Harvie was the Shaw-Macfie Lang Fellow and a tutor at Edinburgh University 1966–1969. He joined the Open University in 1969 as a history lecturer, and from 1978 he was a senior lecturer in history. In 1980, Harvie was appointed Professor of British and Irish Studies at the University of Tübingen. He is the author of several books on topics including Scottish history, nationalism, North Sea oil, the British political novel and European regionalisation.

Harvie was formerly a member of the Labour Party. He co-wrote a pamphlet in favour of the Scottish Assembly along with Gordon Brown in 1979, and co-edited a history of Labour politics in Scotland. In 1988 he left the Labour Party for the SNP.

He is Honorary President of the Scottish Association for Public Transport and holds honorary chairs at the University of Wales, Aberystwyth and the University of Strathclyde. He also writes for Guardian Unlimited's online 'comment is free' site, and he is a contributor to the Scottish Review of Books.

He was elected during the 2007 election for the Mid Scotland and Fife region. He served on the Economy, Energy and Tourism Committee.

Harvie won the Free Spirit of the Year award at The Herald newspaper's 2008 Scottish Politician of the Year awards. He retired as an MSP at the 2011 election.

== See also ==
- Government of the 3rd Scottish Parliament

== Bibliography ==
=== Books ===
- The Lights of Liberalism: University Liberals and the Challenge of Democracy, 1860–1886, Allen Lane, 1976
- No Gods and Precious Few Heroes: Twentieth-century Scotland, first published 1981, Edinburgh University Press (4th Edition), 2000
- The Centre of Things: the Political Novel from Disraeli to the Present, Unwin Hyman, 1991
- Cultural Weapons: Scotland in a New Europe, Polygon, 1992
- The Rise of Regional Europe, Routledge, 1993
- Fool's Gold: the Story of North Sea Oil, Hamish Hamilton, 1994, Penguin 1995
- Travelling Scot: Essays on the History, Politics and Future of the Scots, Argyll Publishing, 1999
- Broonland: The Last Days of Gordon Brown, Verso, 2010
- A Floating Commonwealth: Politics, Culture, and Technology on Britain's Atlantic Coast, 1860–1930, Oxford University Press, 2008
- Mending Scotland, Argyll Publishing, 2004
- Scotland: A Short History, Oxford University Press, 2002
- Deep-Fried Hillman Imp: Scotland's Transport, Argyll Publishing, 2001
- The Road to Home Rule, with Peter Jones, Polygon, 2000
- Scotland and Nationalism: Scottish Society and Politics, 1707–1994, first published 1977, Routledge (4th Edition), 2004, ISBN 0-04-941007-5
- A Voter's Guide to the Scottish Assembly, with Gordon Brown, David Watt & Sons, 1979

=== Articles ===
- Labour and Scottish Government: The Age of Tom Johnston, in The Bulletin of Scottish Politics No. 2, Spring 1981, pp. 1 – 20
- Drumtochty Revisited: The Kailyard, in Lindsay, Maurice (ed.), The Scottish Review: Arts and Environment 27, August 1982, pp. 4 – 11, ISSN 0140-0894
- Beyond Bairns' Play: A New Agenda for Scottish Politics, in Hearn, Sheila G. (ed.), Cencrastus No. 10, Autumn 1982, pp. 11 – 14, ISSN 0264-0856
- Drunk Men Looking at Thistles: Two Political Novels, in Parker, Geoff (ed.), Cencrastus No. 19, Winter 1984, pp. 7 – 9, ISSN 0264-0856
- A Memo to the Chairman of the British Council, in Parker, Geoff (ed.), Cencrastus No. 23, Summer 1986, p. 8, ISSN 0264-0856
- Time Now for a New Politics for Scotland, in Lawson, Alan (ed.), Radical Scotland Apr/May '87, pp. 6 & 7, ISSN 0262-6993
- Faith and Scottish Identity, in Lawson, Alan (ed.), Radical Scotland Jun/Jul '88. pp. 11 – 13, ISSN 0262-6993
