= Democratic Left Scotland =

Political organisation

Democratic Left Scotland (DLS) (Scottish Gaelic: Na Deamocrataich Chli na Alba) is a non-party political organisation established in 1998.

DLS is an "associated member" of the Party of the European Left.

Scottish Greens MSP Maggie Chapman is a member of DLS's National Executive.

== History ==
Scottish individuals within the Democratic Left had been active in both the 1997 Scottish devolution referendum, and subsequent creation of the Scottish Parliament. The DL had Democratic Left spun off into its own organisation, which was created in May 1998 and officially approved via conference in June 1998. Democratic Left Scotland's website claims it was created in May 1999. The DLS supported two organisations in the 1999 Scottish Parliament election, that being the Civil Rights Movement and the Highlands and Islands Alliance.

The DLS supported the "Scottish Coalition for Justice Not War" which opposed the 2003 invasion of Iraq.
