= Oliver Mundell =

Scottish Conservative politician

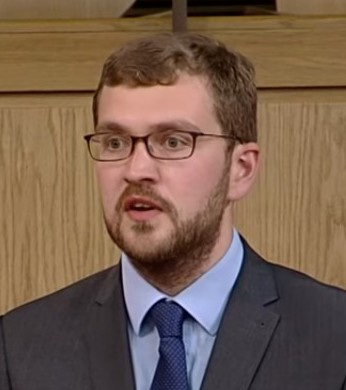
- Mundell in 2016

Member of the Scottish Parliament for Dumfriesshire
- In office 5 May 2016 – 9 April 2026
- Preceded by: Elaine Murray
- Succeeded by: Craig Hoy

Scottish Conservative Shadow portfolios
- 2021–2022: Shadow Cabinet Secretary for Education and Skills
- 2020: Shadow Rural Economy and Tourism

Personal details
- Born: Oliver Gordon Watson Mundell; 1 December 1989 (age 36) Irvine, North Ayrshire, Scotland
- Party: Scottish Conservative
- Spouse: Catherine Easton (m. 2015)
- Relations: David Mundell (father)
- Education: University of Edinburgh

Oliver Gordon Watson Mundell (born 1 December 1989) is a Scottish politician of the Scottish Conservative Party. He served as the Member of the Scottish Parliament (MSP) for the Dumfriesshire constituency from 2016 to 2026. He served as Shadow Cabinet Secretary for Education and Skills from 2021 to September 2022.

== Biography ==
Born in Irvine, North Ayrshire, Mundell was educated at Moffat Academy and graduated with a first-class Bachelor of Laws from the University of Edinburgh. He was first elected in the 2016 Scottish Parliament election and shortly after was made Scottish Conservative spokesperson for community safety. In the 2016 European Union membership referendum, he campaigned to leave the EU, stating he believed Scotland did not receive a good deal from the Common Agricultural Policy. Following the 2021 Scottish Election Oliver Mundell was promoted to Shadow Cabinet Secretary for Education.

On 9 January 2024, Mundell announced he would stand down at the 2026 Scottish Parliament election.

== Personal life ==
Mundell's father is the Conservative MP David Mundell.

Scottish Parliament
Preceded by Elaine Murray	Member of the Scottish Parliament for Dumfriesshire; 2016–present	Incumbent
