= Sandra White =

Scottish politician (born 1951)

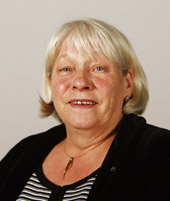

Deputy Convener of the Public Petitions Committee
- In office 14 June 2011 – 25 March 2021
- Preceded by: John Farquhar Munro
- Succeeded by: David Torrance

Member of the Scottish Parliament for Glasgow Kelvin
- In office 5 May 2011 – 5 May 2021
- Preceded by: Pauline McNeill
- Succeeded by: Kaukab Stewart

Member of the Scottish Parliament for Glasgow (1 of 7 Regional MSPs)
- In office 6 May 1999 – 22 March 2011

Personal details
- Born: Sandra Harley; 17 August 1951 (age 74) Glasgow, Scotland
- Party: Scottish National Party

Sandra White (born 17 August 1951) is a retired Scottish National Party (SNP) politician. She was a Member of the Scottish Parliament (MSP) for the Glasgow electoral region from 1999 until 2011, and then the MSP for the Glasgow Kelvin constituency from 2011 until she stood down from the Scottish Parliament at the May 2021 election.

== Political career ==
White served as an SNP councillor in Renfrewshire. She contested Glasgow Kelvin in 1999, where she came second to the Labour Party candidate by 4,408 votes, but was elected to the Scottish Parliament on the Glasgow regional list. She served as an SNP parliamentary group whip in the first parliamentary session. Contesting Glasgow Kelvin in 2003, she came second to Labour by a smaller margin of 3,289 votes. She was re-elected on the regional list, topping the SNP's list of candidates for the Glasgow region, and was given her party's Deputy Social Justice portfolio.

White's campaigns included against closures and downgrading the Royal Hospital for Sick Children, Yorkhill and the Queen Mother's Hospital. She has also campaigned against racism and for improved treatment of asylum seekers, including joining an occupation against dawn raids. Her other campaigns included the successful attempts to save the 7:84 theatre group from threatened loss of funding by the Scottish Arts Council and involvement in Stop the War Coalition events, while high-profile constituency work has included the August 2006 case of an 86-year-old widow who was threatened with court by Glasgow Housing Association.

White was re-elected on the regional list in 2007 and, in the 2011 election, she again contested the Glasgow Kelvin seat, this time defeating the sitting Labour MSP Pauline McNeill by 882 votes. She sat as deputy convener of the Public Petitions Committee and Equal Opportunities Committee.

In November 2015 White retweeted an antisemitic cartoon showing piglets suckling a large pig with the word “Rothschild” written on it and showing a bank with a Star of David. The tweet had originally been sent by a Twitter user who had repeatedly posted antisemitic messages and images. After The Jewish Chronicle brought the tweet to the attention of the SNP, the party's spokesperson said the tweet had been re-tweeted in error, and had since been deleted.

In August 2020, White announced that she would not be standing for re-election at the upcoming Holyrood election.

== Personal life ==
White was born on 17 August 1951 to Elizabeth Rodgers and Henry Harley. She married David White in 1971, and has two sons and one daughter. Her interests outside politics are walking, reading and gardening.

Scottish Parliament
Preceded by Pauline McNeill	Member of the Scottish Parliament for Glasgow Kelvin; 2011–2021	Succeeded by Kaukab Stewart
