= Opinion polling for the 1999 Scottish Parliament election =

In the run-up to the 1999 Scottish Parliament election, various organisations conducted opinion polls to gauge voting intentions. Results of such polls are displayed in this list. Most of the pollsters listed were members of the British Polling Council (BPC) and abided by its disclosure rules.

== Constituency vote ==
View source data.

Pollster	Client	Date(s) conducted	Sample size	Lab	SNP	Con	Lib Dem	Others	Lead
1999 Scottish Parliament election		6 May 1999	2,350,327	38.8%	28.7%	15.6%	14.2%	2.7%	10.1%
Scottish Opinion Ltd	Daily Record	1–4 May 1999	1,108	46.8%	28.3%	12.4%	12.5%	0%	18.5%
ICM Research	The Scotsman	2–3 May 1999	1,005	42%	30%	14%	12%	2%	12%
National Opinion Polls	Daily Express	30 Apr – 2 May 1999	750	46%	31%	13%	8%	2%	15%
ICM Research	Scotland on Sunday	28–29 Apr 1999	1,000	44%	31%	13%	10%	2%	13%
MORI	Sunday Herald	27–29 Apr 1999	1,000	48%	33%	8%	9%	2%	15%
National Opinion Polls	The Sunday Times	N/A	N/A	45%	30%	13%	9%	3%	15%
Scottish Opinion Ltd	Daily Record	26–30 Apr 1999	1,198	45.6%	32.1%	11.6%	10.6%	0.1%	13.5%
System Three	The Herald	22–27 Apr 1999	984	44%	33%	10%	10%	3%	11%
Scottish Opinion Ltd	Daily Record	31 Mar – 27 Apr 1999	4,108	44.5%	25.5%	13.9%	16.1%	0%	19%
ICM Research	The Scotsman	22–23 Apr 1999	1,116	47%	29%	12%	10%	2%	18%
Scottish Opinion Ltd	Daily Record	14–20 Apr 1999	1,006	47.9%	32.4%	12.3%	7.4%	0%	15.5%
System Three	The Herald	16–18 Apr 1999	3,255	45%	26%	11%	13%	5%	19%
National Opinion Polls	Daily Express	16–18 Apr 1999	750	49%	28%	9%	11%	1%	21%
ICM Research	The Scotsman	9–10 Apr 1999	1,006	46%	30%	13%	10%	1%	16%
National Opinion Polls	The Sunday Times	6–8 Apr 1999	1,004	46%	33%	11%	8%	2%	13%
System Three	The Herald	25 Feb – 3 Mar 1999	982	39%	39%	11%	11%	0%	Tied
ICM Research	The Scotsman	28 Feb – 1 Mar 1999	1,005	44%	34%	12%	9%	1%	10%

== Regional vote ==
View source data.

Pollster	Client	Date(s) conducted	Sample size	Lab	SNP	Con	Lib Dem	Others	Lead
1999 Scottish Parliament election		6 May 1999	2,346,182	33.6%	27.3%	15.4%	12.4%	11.3%	6.3%
Scottish Opinion Ltd	Daily Record	1–4 May 1999	1,108	42.2%	30.0%	12.7%	15.1%	0%	12.2%
ICM Research	The Scotsman	2–3 May 1999	1,005	41%	30%	14%	10%	5%	11%
National Opinion Polls	Daily Express	30 Apr – 2 May 1999	750	36%	32%	14%	10%	8%	4%
ICM Research	Scotland on Sunday	28–29 Apr 1999	1,000	40%	31%	11%	14%	4%	9%
MORI	Sunday Herald	27–29 Apr 1999	1,000	44%	33%	9%	10%	4%	11%
National Opinion Polls	The Sunday Times	N/A	N/A	38%	32%	12%	11%	7%	6%
Scottish Opinion Ltd	Daily Record	26–30 Apr 1999	1,198	39.0%	33.9%	11.1%	16.0%	0%	5.1%
System Three	The Herald	22–27 Apr 1999	984	37%	34%	10%	13%	6%	3%
Scottish Opinion Ltd	Daily Record	31 Mar – 27 Apr 1999	4,108	41.3%	29.6%	11.9%	17.2%	0%	11.7%
ICM Research	The Scotsman	22–23 Apr 1999	1,116	46%	28%	12%	11%	3%	18%
Scottish Opinion Ltd	Daily Record	14–20 Apr 1999	1,006	48.1%	31.7%	12.3%	7.9%	0%	16.4%
System Three	The Herald	16–18 Apr 1999	3,255	40%	27%	12%	14%	7%	13%
National Opinion Polls	Daily Express	16–18 Apr 1999	750	44%	32%	9%	10%	5%	12%
ICM Research	The Scotsman	9–10 Apr 1999	1,006	43%	32%	11%	11%	3%	11%
National Opinion Polls	The Sunday Times	6–8 Apr 1999	1,004	42%	33%	12%	11%	2%	9%
System Three	The Herald	25 Mar – 3 Apr 1999	982	40%	36%	10%	12%	2%	4%
ICM Research	The Scotsman	28 Mar – 1 Apr 1999	1,005	41%	33%	13%	11%	2%	8%
