= Elaine Murray =

British politician (born 1954)

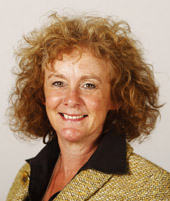
- Official portrait, 2011

Leader of Dumfries and Galloway Council
- In office 23 May 2017 – 5 May 2022
- Deputy: Rob Davidson
- Preceded by: Ronnie Nicholson
- Succeeded by: Stephen Thompson

Councillor for Nith, Dumfries & Galloway
- In office 5 May 2017 – 5 May 2022
- Preceded by: Colin Smyth
- Succeeded by: Keith Walters

Scottish Labour Group Leader, Dumfries & Galloway Council
- In office 15 May 2017 – 5 May 2022
- Preceded by: Ronnie Nicholson
- Succeeded by: Linda Dorward

Member of the Scottish Parliament for Dumfriesshire Dumfries (1999–2011)
- In office 6 May 1999 – 24 March 2016
- Preceded by: Constituency established
- Succeeded by: Oliver Mundell

Personal details
- Born: 22 December 1954 (age 71) Hitchin, Hertfordshire, England
- Party: Labour
- Education: University of Edinburgh, University of Cambridge
- Occupation: Politician

Elaine Kildare Murray (born 22 December 1954) is a retired Scottish Labour politician. She was leader of Dumfries and Galloway Council for the 2017–2022 term. She was also the Member of the Scottish Parliament (MSP) for Dumfries from 1999 to 2011, and then for Dumfriesshire from 2011 to 2016. At the 1999, 2003 and 2007 elections, Murray increased her percentage share of the vote. She was Shadow Minister for the Environment in the Scottish Parliament. She lost her seat in 2016.

In May 2017, Murray was elected one of four councillors in Dumfries and Galloway who represent the Nith ward and was elected the Group Leader of Labour in the council. She did not stand for re-election in 2022.

== Background ==
Murray was born in Hitchin, Hertfordshire, where her Scottish parents lived at the time. She was brought up in Edinburgh, where she was a pupil at The Mary Erskine School, and graduated with an undergraduate degree in chemistry from the University of Edinburgh and a PhD in physical chemistry from the University of Cambridge.

After graduating from Cambridge, Murray first worked in scientific research, and from 1990–93 was an associate lecturer for the Open University. At the same time, she worked for Alex Smith, Member of the European Parliament. In 1994 Murray was elected as a Councillor on Strathclyde Regional Council and in 1995 to South Ayrshire Council, where she was Convenor of Educational Services.

== Member of the Scottish Parliament ==
Murray was elected as Member of the Scottish Parliament (MSP) for the Dumfries constituency following the first Scottish Parliamentary elections in May 1999. She was re-elected in 2003 and then again in 2007, 2011 and 2016.

Murray was appointed Deputy Minister for Tourism, Culture and Sport upon Jack McConnell becoming First Minister in 2001, a post she held until 2003. She has been a member of a number of Committees in the Scottish Parliament, including holding the post of Deputy Convenor of the Finance Committee between 2007 and 2008. Murray was Enterprise Spokesman under Wendy Alexander's leadership and upon election of Iain Gray as Leader of the Labour Group in the Scottish Parliament, she was appointed Shadow Minister for the Environment.

Murray was a member of the Rural Affairs and Environment Committee as well as Convenor of the Cross Party Groups on Science and Technology and Civil Nuclear Energy. She was also Vice-Convenor of the Life Sciences and Animal Welfare Cross Party Groups.

In September 2011, Murray announced her candidacy for the deputy leadership of the Scottish Labour Party. She withdrew in early November after failing to gain enough nominations. She claimed she could have got the sufficient number of nominations but said it was clear the Deputy Leadership role would go to a Westminster MP.

At the 2016 Scottish Parliament election, Murray lost her seat to Oliver Mundell, a Conservative.

== Dumfries and Galloway councillor ==
At the 2017 Scottish local elections, Murray stood for election in the Dumfries and Galloway ward of Nith and was elected as one of four councillors for the ward. She later became leader of the council, but announced her retirement from politics in April 2022, saying: "I want to do other things while I'm still fit and healthy. I have been an elected representative in local or national politics for 27 out of the last 28 years and I feel that's long enough."

Scottish Parliament
New constituency	Member of the Scottish Parliament for Dumfries; 1999–2011	Constituency abolished
New constituency	Member of the Scottish Parliament for Dumfriesshire; 2011–2016	Succeeded by Oliver Mundell
Political offices
New office	Deputy Minister for Tourism, Culture and Sport; 2001–2003	Office abolished
