= Pauline McNeill =

Scottish Labour politician

Pauline McNeill MSP
- Official portrait, 2026

Convener of the Justice Committee
- In office 7 May 2003 – 2 April 2007
- Preceded by: Christine Grahame
- Succeeded by: Bill Aitken

Member of the Scottish Parliament for Glasgow (1 of 7 Regional MSPs)
- Incumbent
- Assumed office 5 May 2016

Member of the Scottish Parliament for Glasgow Kelvin
- In office 6 May 1999 – 22 March 2011
- Preceded by: Constituency established
- Succeeded by: Sandra White

Scottish Labour portfolios
- 2019–2021: Shadow Minister for Equalities
- 2019–2021: Shadow Cabinet Secretary for Communities, Housing and Local Government
- 2021-23: Shadow Cabinet Secretary for Justice

Personal details
- Born: 12 September 1962 (age 64) Paisley, Scotland
- Party: Scottish Labour Co-operative
- Spouse: Joseph Cahill
- Education: Glasgow College of Building and Printing
- Occupation: Trade unionist

Pauline Mary McNeill (born 12 September 1962) is a Scottish Labour and Co-operative Party politician serving as a Member of the Scottish Parliament (MSP) for the Glasgow region. She previously represented the Glasgow Kelvin constituency. Having represented her constituency since the 1999 Scottish Parliament election, she was not re-elected in 2011. However, she returned to the Scottish Parliament on the Glasgow regional list at the following election in 2016.

== Early life and career ==
McNeil was educated at the co-educational, Roman Catholic Our Lady's High School, Cumbernauld before training as a graphic illustrator at Glasgow College of Building and Printing. She was President of the National Union of Students Scotland from 1986 to 1988 and was subsequently an organiser for GMB Scotland, representing NHS, hospitality and factory staff.

An active member of the Labour Party since her time in the student movement, McNeill was also an executive committee member of the Campaign for a Scottish Assembly and a campaigner for devolution throughout the 1980s and 1990s.

During her first term as an MSP, McNeill graduated from Strathclyde Law School after a period combining legislating and night school.

== Political career ==
McNeill was elected Member of the Scottish Parliament for Glasgow Kelvin in the 1999 Scottish Parliament election. In the 1999–2003 Parliament, she served as vice-chair of the Scottish Parliament Labour Group.

McNeill was re-elected as an MSP in 2003 and was appointed convener of the Justice Committee. She led parliamentary consideration of:

- Land Reform (Scotland) Act 2003
- Civil Partnership Act 2004
- Rights of Relatives to Damages (Mesothelioma) (Scotland) Bill
- Scottish Criminal Record Office Inquiry
- Scottish Commission for Human Rights Act 2006
- Family Law (Scotland) Act 2006

McNeill's committee also led consideration of reforms to the High Court amongst many other subjects and convened the first ever inquiry into the Crown and Procurator Fiscal Service, and helped deliver justice for asbestos victims in the Court of Session. In 2005, she was awarded the Equality Network's Friend for Life award for her work on the committee ensuring the Civil Partnership Act 2004 and Gender Recognition Act 2004 legislation passed at the British Government level were compliant with existing Scottish legislation. Later, her committee won Committee of the Year at the 2006 Scottish Politician of the Year Awards.

McNeill, a former band manager, was convener of the Cross Party Group on Contemporary Music. The group worked with key figures in the Scottish live music industry to launch the Scottish Live Music Manifesto and publish a Live Music Code of Conduct and Live Music Agreement, to improve protection for bands and young musicians from unscrupulous venues, agents and promoters.

McNeill was a staunch opponent of the Iraq War and campaigned for the right of protesters to picket the 2003 Scottish Labour Party Conference, which took place at the SECC in her own constituency.

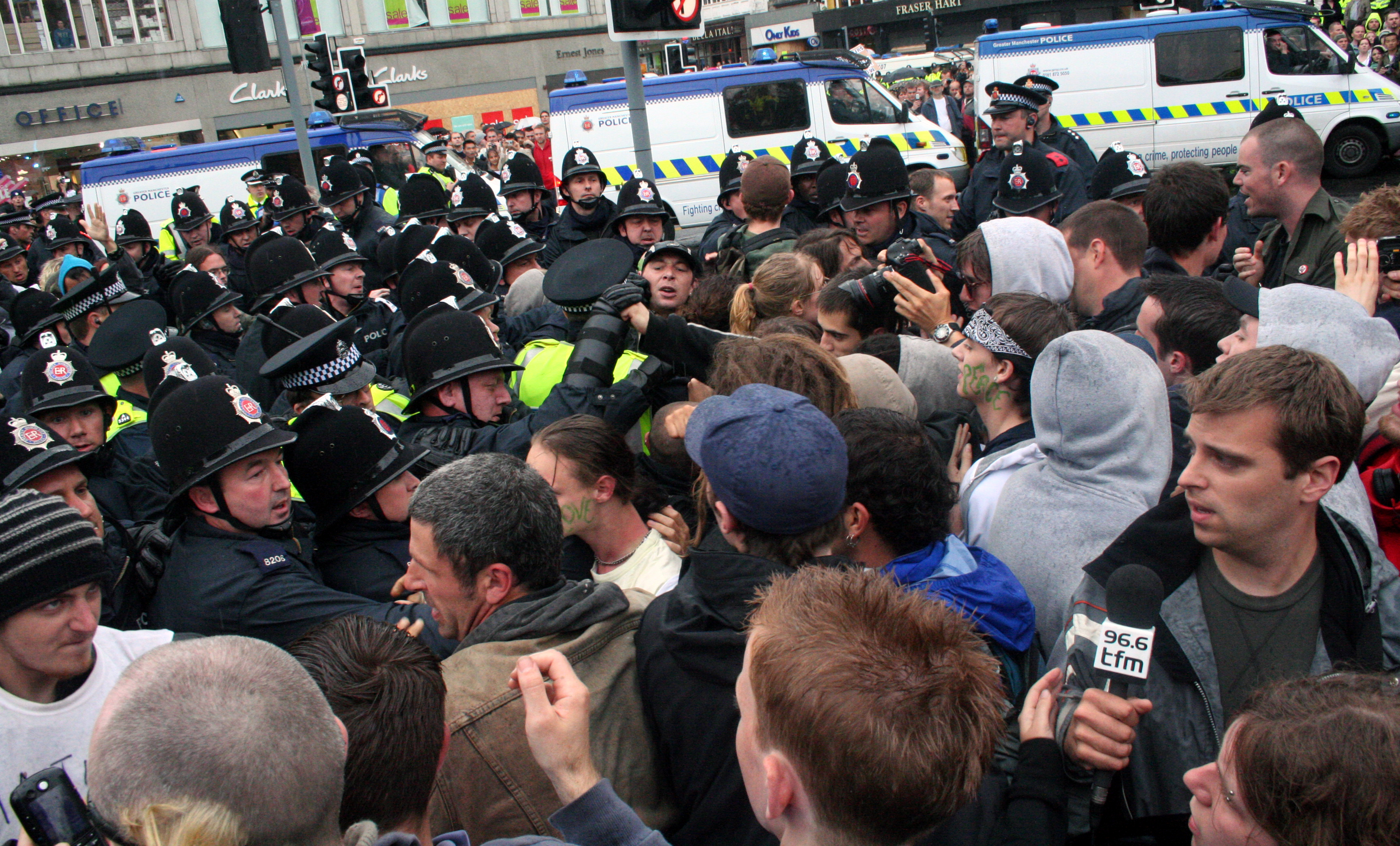
McNeill was a demonstrator at the 2005 G8 protests in Edinburgh

On 2 July 2005, McNeill was a demonstrator in a Make Poverty History march in Edinburgh when the 31st G8 summit met at Gleneagles Hotel in Perthshire.

As Convener of the Cross Party Group on Palestine, she was a United Nations observer at the 2006 Palestinian legislative election. Later in 2006, she visited Lebanon in the aftermath of the war there.

In 2007, McNeill narrowly retained the Glasgow Kelvin seat with a reduced majority in the wake of public opposition to the national Labour government's invasion of Iraq, a policy she opposed. Following the election, she was appointed Scottish Labour Spokesperson for Children and Early Years and subsequently Spokesperson for Europe, External Affairs and Culture.

McNeill lost Glasgow Kelvin in 2011 but was elected on the Glasgow regional list in 2016. She is currently the Shadow Cabinet Secretary for Justice. In addition to this, she is Deputy Convenor of the Social Security Committee, a new committee created in response to the increase in devolved powers given by the Scotland Act 2016. She is also a substitute member for the Delegated Powers and Law Reform Committee and the Local Government and Communities Committee.

McNeill nominated Anas Sarwar in the 2021 Scottish Labour leadership election.

At the 2021 Scottish Parliament election McNeill was supported as a Labour Co-operative candidate for the first time. She contested the constituency seat of Glasgow Shettleston but was returned to Parliament as a Glasgow regional list member again.

McNeill was one of 5 Labour MSPs who was absent for a Scottish Parliament vote calling for the UK Government to reverse its decision to means-test the Winter Fuel Payment.

McNeill was the Labour candidate for Glasgow Baillieston and Shettleston constituency at the 2026 Scottish Parliament election. She was re-elected list MSP in the 2026 Scottish Parliament election.

=== Local campaigning ===
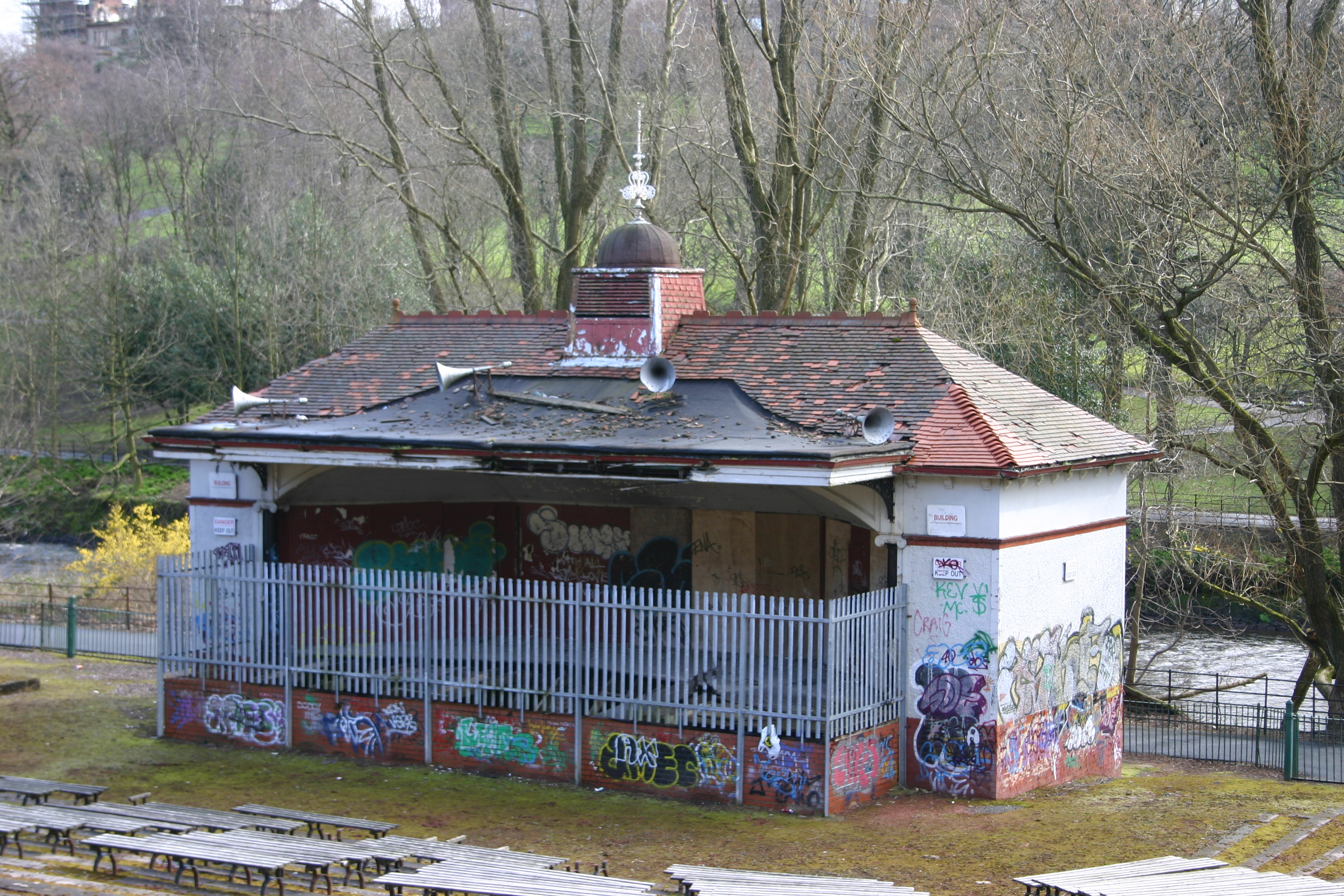
Kelvingrove Park bandstand in 2007

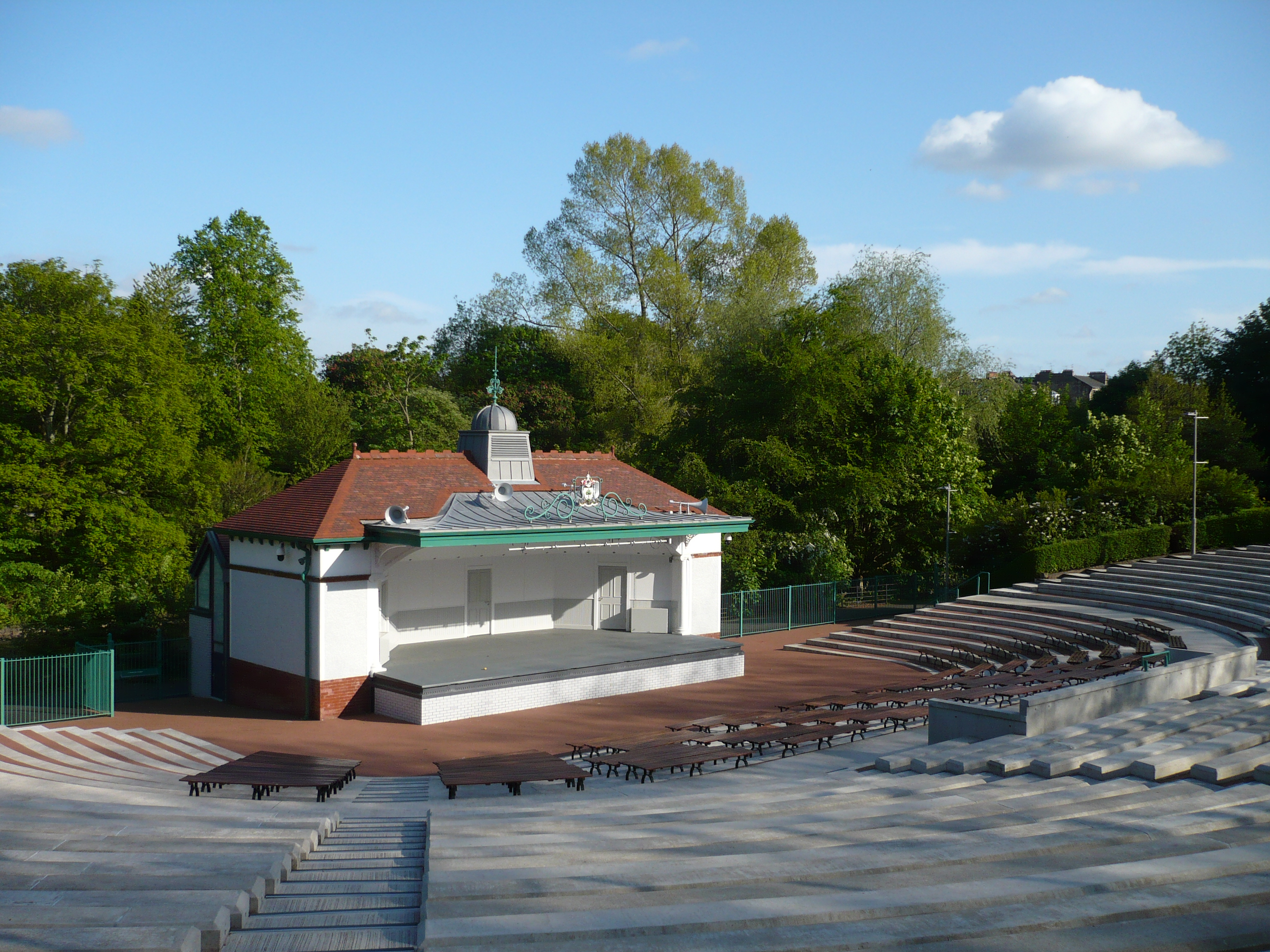
Refurbished Kelvingrove Park bandstand in 2016

From 1999 until 2011, McNeill corresponded with 15,000 constituents by letter or at meetings and surgeries. She has campaigned on the need for more affordable and social housing, and better regulation of housing in multiple occupation.

On the environment, she has campaigned for more effective steps to increase recycling take-up and reduce energy usage.

On transport and planning, McNeill has called for better regulation of the bus industry, improvements to the Glasgow Subway, a more locally accountable planning system and improving local sports facilities. She has supported successful campaigns to grant Fair Trade status to the City of Glasgow and restore the Kelvingrove Park bandstand.

On crime, McNeill has sought better safety in Glasgow's city centre and the extension of community protections to its West End.

McNeill unsuccessfully campaigned against the downgrading of the Royal Hospital for Sick Children, Yorkhill and the Queen Mother's Hospital, including raising a 1,600-signature petition. However, children's services at what became West Glasgow Ambulatory Care Hospital closed in 2015 and their responsibilities were taken up by the Royal Hospital for Children, Glasgow.

=== Political positions and views ===
Since her student days, McNeill has had a strong interest in defence and foreign policy issues. She opposes the replacement of Trident with a new nuclear weapons system, opposes the holding of prisoners at Guantanamo Bay and has spoken out in favour of the rights of asylum seekers and new migrants. She continues to speak out, both in parliament and at public demonstrations, on the need for Middle East peace.

McNeill remains a supporter of many student campaigns, including the successful campaign to elect Israeli dissident Mordechai Vanunu as Rector of Glasgow University and takes a keen interest in the welfare of students across the many further and higher institutions located in Glasgow.

== Personal life ==
In 1999, at the Candlelight Chapel in Las Vegas, McNeill married Joseph Cahill, an advocate, a former police officer and Deputy Procurator Fiscal.

Scottish Parliament
New parliament Scotland Act 1998	Member of the Scottish Parliament for Glasgow Kelvin; 1999–2011	Succeeded by Sandra White
