= Bristow Muldoon =

Scottish politician of the Labour Party

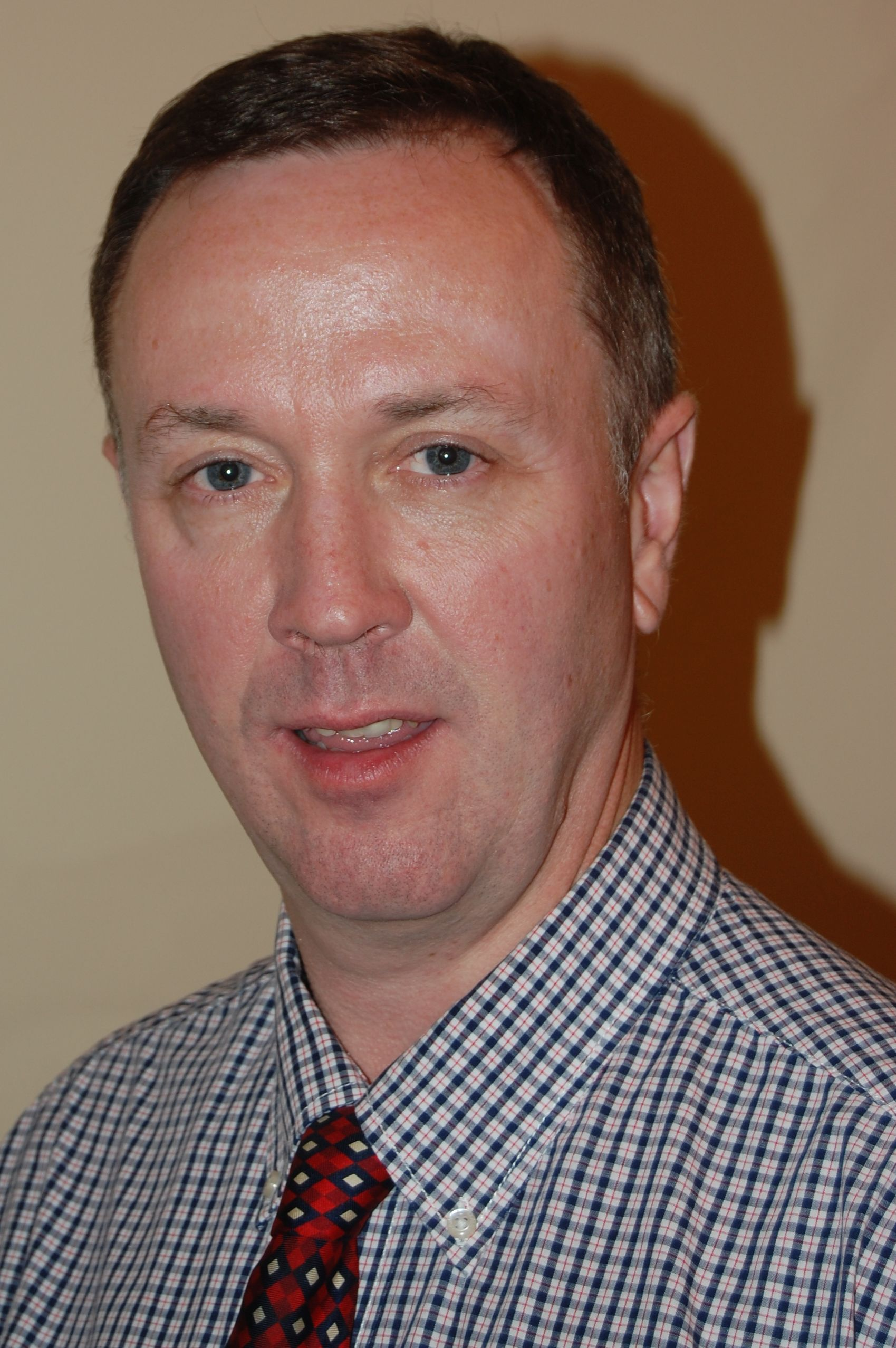
- Muldoon in October 2014

Member of the Scottish Parliament for Livingston
- In office 6 May 1999 – 2 April 2007
- Preceded by: New Parliament
- Succeeded by: Angela Constance

Personal details
- Born: 19 March 1964 (age 62) Glasgow, Scotland
- Party: Scottish Labour Party
- Education: University of Strathclyde; Open University
- Muldoon's voice recorded October 2014

Bristow Muldoon (born 19 March 1964 in Glasgow) is a former Scottish Labour politician.

He was the Member of the Scottish Parliament (MSP) for the Livingston constituency from 1999 to 2007, but then lost the seat to Angela Constance of the SNP. Before this, he was a Councillor at both Lothian Regional Council and West Lothian Council.

Prior to 1999, he worked as a manager in a series of roles for InterCity and then for GNER over a period of 13 years.

On 13 August 2007, it was announced that he had been appointed as the first Scottish Parliamentary Liaison Officer jointly for the Royal Society of Edinburgh and the Royal Society of Chemistry.

He is a graduate of both the University of Strathclyde and the Open University.

He is married to Cllr Catherine Muldoon, Provost of West Lothian and has three sons, Jamie, Andrew and David and one grandson, Leo Jones Muldoon.

Scottish Parliament
| New parliament Scotland Act 1998 | Member of the Scottish Parliament for Livingston; 1999–2007 | Succeeded by Angela Constance |
