= Dumfriesshire (Scottish Parliament constituency) =

Region or constituency of the Scottish Parliament

- County constituency for the Scottish Parliament
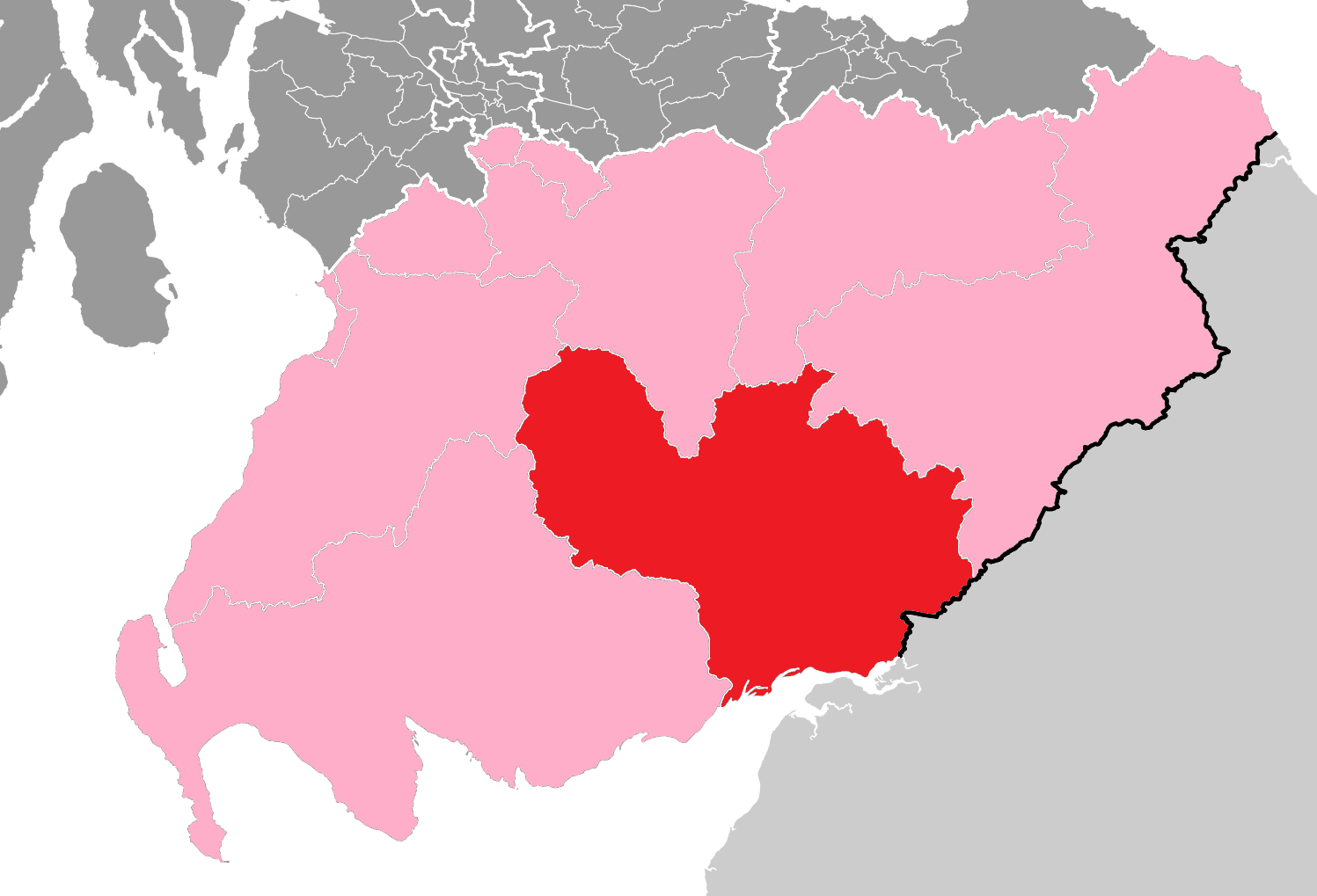

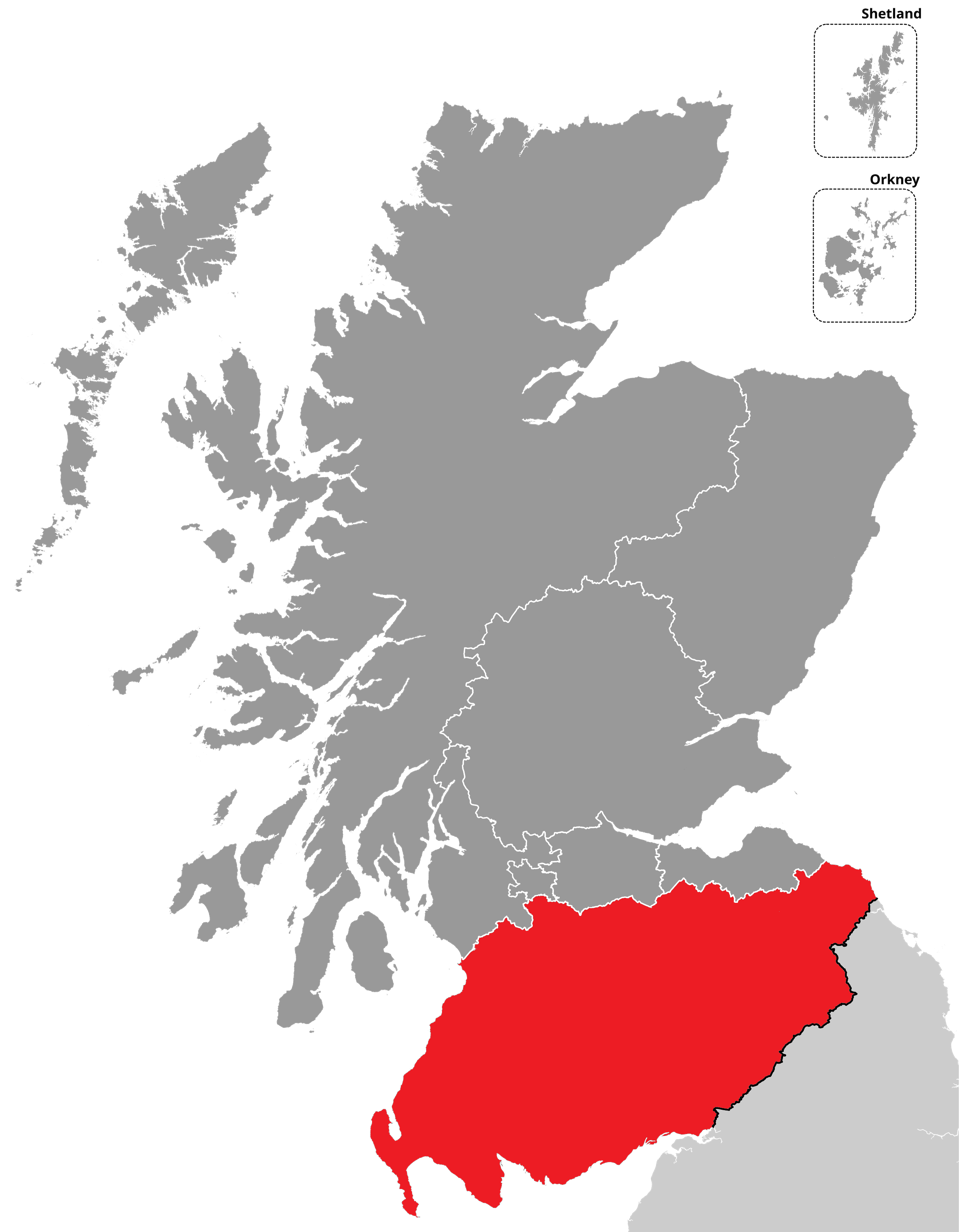
- Dumfriesshire shown within the South Scotland electoral region, and the region shown within Scotland
- Electoral region: South Scotland
- Electorate: 63,310 (2026)

Current constituency
- Created: 2011
- Party: Conservative
- MSP: Craig Hoy
- Council area: Dumfries and Galloway
- Created from: Dumfries, Galloway and Upper Nithsdale

Dumfriesshire (Gaelic: Siorrachd Dhùn Phris) is a county constituency of the Scottish Parliament covering part of the council area of Dumfries and Galloway. Under the additional-member electoral system used for elections to the Scottish Parliament, it elects one Member of the Scottish Parliament (MSP) by the first past the post method of election. It is also one of ten constituencies in the South Scotland electoral region, which elects seven additional members, in addition to the ten constituency MSPs, to produce a form of proportional representation for the region as a whole.

Created for the 2011 Scottish Parliament election, the constituency comprises areas that were previously part of the old Dumfries and Galloway and Upper Nithsdale constituencies, which were abolished and replaced by Dumfriesshire and Galloway and West Dumfries. The seat is largely identical to the historic county of Dumfriesshire.

The seat has been held by Craig Hoy of the Scottish Conservatives since the 2026 Scottish Parliament election.

== Electoral region ==
Following the second periodic review of Scottish Parliament boundaries in 2025, the other nine constituencies of the South Scotland region are: Ayr; Carrick, Cumnock and Doon Valley; Clydesdale; East Kilbride; Ettrick, Roxburgh and Berwickshire; Galloway and West Dumfries; Hamilton, Larkhall and Stonehouse; Kilmarnock and Irvine Valley; and Midlothian South, Tweeddale and Lauderdale. The region covers the whole of the council areas of Dumfries and Galloway, Scottish Borders, and South Ayrshire council areas; and parts of the council areas of East Ayrshire, Midlothian, and South Lanarkshire. By population it is now the largest of Scotland's eight electoral regions.

Prior to the 2025 review, there were nine constituencies in the South Scotland region. Besides Dumfriesshire, the other eight constituencies were: Ayr; Carrick, Cumnock and Doon Valley; Clydesdale; East Lothian; Ettrick, Roxburgh and Berwickshire; Galloway and West Dumfries; Kilmarnock and Irvine Valley; and Midlothian South, Tweeddale and Lauderdale. The region covered the Dumfries and Galloway, East Ayrshire, Scottish Borders and South Ayrshire council areas in full and parts of the East Lothian, Midlothian and South Lanarkshire council areas.

== Constituency boundaries and council area ==
Map of boundaries from 2011

Electoral wards of the Dumfriesshire Scottish Parliament constituency as of 2011

Dumfries and Galloway is represented in the Scottish Parliament by two constituencies: Dumfriesshire and Galloway and West Dumfries. Dumfriesshire covers the eastern part of the council area. The town of Dumfries is divided between the two constituencies.

The seat remained largely unchanged following the Second Periodic Review of Scottish Parliament Boundaries undertaken by Boundaries Scotland ahead of the 2026 Scottish Parliament election, although there was a minor amendment to alter the section of the boundary with Galloway and West Dumfries that follows the River Nith: previously this had followed the riverbank, the review moved this to the centre of the river to align with ward boundaries. The electoral wards of Dumfries and Galloway Council used in the current creation of Clydesdale are:

- Mid and Upper Nithsdale
- Lochar
- Nith
- Annandale South
- Annandale North
- Annandale East and Eskdale

== Member of the Scottish Parliament ==
Election	Member	Party
2011	Elaine Murray	Labour
2016	Oliver Mundell	Conservative
2026	Craig Hoy	Conservative

== Election results ==

=== 2020s ===
2026 Scottish Parliament election: Dumfriesshire
Party	Candidate	Constituency			Regional		
Party	Candidate	Votes	%	±%	Votes	%	±%
Conservative	Craig Hoy (Note: Incumbent member on the party list, or for another constituency)	11,370	34.8	▼12.9	10,114	30.9	▼12.0
SNP	Stephen Thompson	10,262	31.4	▼6.3	8,076	24.7	▼10.2
Reform	David Kirkwood (Note: Elected on the party list)	5,783	17.7	New	6,233	19.1	▲18.9
Labour Co-op	Linda Dorward	3,364	10.3	▼1.1	3,295	10.1	▼1.7
Green					2,434	7.4	▲4.0
Liberal Democrats	Iain McDonald	1,660	5.1	▲1.9	1,594	4.9	▲2.4
Independent Green Voice					238	0.7	▲0.3
Scottish Common Party	Paul Adkins	200	0.6	New	87	0.3	New
Scottish Family					183	0.6	▲0.3
AtLS					169	0.5	New
Scottish Socialist					64	0.2	New
UKIP					46	0.1	▼0.1
Independent	Denise Sommerville				46	0.1	New
ADF					42	0.1	New
Heritage					41	0.1	New
Independent	Sean Davies				34	0.1	New
Scottish Libertarian					23	0.1	Steady
Majority		1,108	3.4	▼6.6			
Valid votes		32,639			32,719		
Invalid votes		112			88		
Turnout		32,751	51.7	▼14.3	32,807	51.8	
Conservative hold		Swing					

2021 Scottish Parliament election: Dumfriesshire
Party	Candidate	Constituency			Regional		
Party	Candidate	Votes	%	±%	Votes	%	±%
Conservative	Oliver Mundell (Note: Incumbent member for this constituency)	19,487	47.7	▲10.4	17,561	42.9	▲5.8
SNP	Joan McAlpine	15,421	37.7	▲3.8	14,301	34.9	▲1.2
Labour Co-op	Colin Smyth	4,671	11.4	▼13.8	4,834	11.8	▼7.5
Green					1,376	3.4	▲0.2
Liberal Democrats	Richard Brodie	1,314	3.2	▼0.3	1,034	2.5	▼0.5
All for Unity					778	1.9	New
Alba					292	0.7	New
Independent Green Voice					163	0.4	New
Abolish the Scottish Parliament					151	0.4	New
Scottish Family					134	0.3	New
Reform					85	0.2	New
UKIP					82	0.2	▼2.5
Freedom Alliance (UK)					76	0.2	New
Scottish Libertarian					44	0.1	New
Scotia Future					15	0.0	New
Vanguard					10	0.0	New
Majority		4,066	10.0	▲6.6			
Valid votes		40,893			40,883		
Invalid votes		111					
Turnout		41,004	66.0	▲6.1			
Conservative hold		Swing					

=== 2010s ===
2016 Scottish Parliament election: Dumfriesshire
Party	Candidate	Constituency			Regional		
Party	Candidate	Votes	%	±%	Votes	%	±%
Conservative	Oliver Mundell	13,536	37.3	▲7.7	13,451	37.1	▲12.5
SNP	Joan McAlpine (Note: Incumbent member on the party list, or for another constituency)	12,306	33.9	▲7.6	12,212	33.7	▲1.2
Labour	Elaine Murray (Note: Incumbent member for this constituency)	9,151	25.2	▼14.3	7,019	19.3	▼11.1
Green					1,178	3.2	▲0.7
Liberal Democrats	Richard Brodie	1,267	3.5	▼1.0	1,080	3.0	▼0.5
UKIP					990	2.7	▲0.9
RISE					131	0.4	New
Clydesdale and South Scotland Independent					126	0.3	New
Solidarity					104	0.3	▲0.1
Majority		1,230	3.4	N/A			
Valid votes		36,260			36,291		
Invalid votes		101			82		
Turnout		36,361	59.9	▲6.3	36,373	59.9	▲6.2
Conservative gain from Labour		Swing		▲11.0			
Notes

2011 Scottish Parliament election: Dumfriesshire
Party	Candidate	Constituency			Regional		
Party	Candidate	Votes	%	±%	Votes	%	±%
Labour	Elaine Murray (Note: Incumbent member for the Dumfries constituency)	12,624	39.6	N/A	9,719	30.4	N/A
Conservative	Gill Dykes	9,468	29.7	N/A	7,841	24.5	N/A
SNP	Aileen Orr	8,384	26.3	N/A	10,373	32.4	N/A
Liberal Democrats	Richard Brodie	1,419	4.4	N/A	1,123	3.5	N/A
Green					822	2.6	N/A
UKIP					587	1.8	N/A
All-Scotland Pensioners Party					566	1.8	N/A
Socialist Labour					388	1.2	N/A
BNP					235	0.7	N/A
Scottish Christian					199	0.6	N/A
Scottish Socialist					72	0.2	N/A
Solidarity					48	0.2	N/A
Majority		3,156	9.9	N/A			
Valid votes		31,895			31,973		
Invalid votes		112			88		
Turnout		32,007	53.6	N/A	32,061	53.7	N/A
Labour win (new seat)							
