= Highlands and Islands Alliance =

Highlands and Islands Alliance Càirdeas
- Leader: Lorraine Mann
- Founded: Autumn 1998
- Dissolved: 24 August 2004
- Headquarters: Midoxgate House; Fearn, Ross-shire; IV20 1RP
- Ideology: Localism; Regionalism; Soft Euroscepticism

The Highlands and Islands Alliance or Càirdeas was a minor Scottish electoral alliance that was active in the late 1990s. Founded in the autumn of 1998 by non-partisan politicians local to the Highlands and Islands, it only contested the inaugural Scottish Parliament election of 1999, where it collected a negligible 1.3% of the regional vote and despite a reasonably publicised campaign, failed to elect any of its candidates. Led by anti-nuclear activist Lorraine Mann, the Alliance was established to better represent marginalised communities in rural Scotland, who they felt had been ignored by government in favour of those in the more densely populated Central Belt. Its policies were near exclusively centred on localism and rural issues, only contesting Scotland's regional additional member system so that electors could vote on nationwide matters through their constituency ballot. After the election, the group remained politically inactive until it was quietly disestablished in August 2004.

Although electorally unimportant, the Alliance's legal campaign to allow political job sharing in the Scottish Parliament attracted considerable media and academic coverage. The dispute has since become the subject of legislative research by both the Northern Ireland Assembly and the British House of Commons, where it informed debate surrounding the Sex Discrimination (Election Candidates) Act 2002.

== History ==
=== Formation and development ===
The Highlands and Islands electoral region shown within Scotland

Overseen by then-Prime Minister Tony Blair's administration, a Scottish Parliament was to be established in accordance with the 1997 Scottish devolution referendum result. In response, the Highlands and Islands Alliance was founded in the autumn of 1998 by local activists who sought to "create a strong, independent voice for the Highlands and Islands" in preparation for the following year's inaugural election. They believed that the Central Belt in the Scottish Lowlands, the most densely populated area in the country, had received a disproportionate amount of attention from the British Government in Westminster and that rural communities were being neglected as a consequence. The group also wanted to redress the fact, that in their opinion, residents in the Highlands and Islands experienced "the lowest incomes and highest taxes in the UK". Alliance members believed that the establishment of a devolved parliament at Holyrood was an opportunity to enhance their region's representation, commenting "[we] have great hopes that Holyrood will not emerge Russian-doll like from Westminster".

Members instrumental in the Alliance's development included playwright Edwin 'Eddie' Stiven, Black Isle Councillor Bryan Beattie and the group's sole leader, anti-nuclear activist Lorraine Mann. Prior to leading the party, Mann campaigned successfully and single-handedly against nuclear reprocessing at the Dounreay Nuclear Power Development Establishment in Caithness, further serving as Convenor of Scotland Against Nuclear Dumping. The Alliance was formerly registered with the Electoral Commission on 25 February 1999, with Beattie acting as nominating officer, as well as treasurer, and Mann as leader. Consisting of about 280 members, the group were headquartered at Midoxgate House, a converted pigsty in the small hamlet of Fearn. Before its official registration, the party steadily built up a respectable profile; this included interviews with The Guardian on 22 and 26 January, in which they declared their intention to stand in the Scottish Parliament election, as well as criticised the disconnection between Highland parliamentarians and the constituencies they represented.

=== Parliamentary campaign ===
The Alliance ran an active parliamentary campaign, sometimes labelling themselves as Càirdeas, a Scottish Gaelic word that "has a meaning incorporating friendship, fellowship, relationship, goodwill and alliance." Their efforts were an object of media attention, becoming the subject of several articles by BBC News, The Economist, The Glasgow Herald, The Guardian, The Independent and other publications. Leader Lorraine Mann also attended a land reform debate at Aberdeen University on 16 April, where she was joined by Iain Haughie of the Scottish Conservatives, Dot Jessiman of the Scottish National Party (SNP), Charles Kennedy of the Scottish Liberal Democrats and Lord Sewel of the Scottish Labour Party. Despite reasonable coverage in public life, the party produced a "disappointing" result at the election, held on 6 May 1999. They captured 2,607 votes, 1.3% of those cast in the Parliament's additional member Highlands and Islands electoral region; the group did not contest the region's individual first-past-the-post constituencies, leaving potential supporters to vote on nationwide issues as they saw fit.

At one time, commentators observed that the Alliance was "on the verge of taking one seat", with the "outside chance of winning one or two seats", though all of the group's candidates were ultimately defeated. Among them was Arthur Cormack, an Alliance candidate otherwise known as a traditional Scottish singer. Following the election, the group remained electorally inactive until it was, without statement, voluntarily deregistered from the Electoral Commission on 24 August 2004.

== Ideology and policies ==
Ideologically, journalist James Cusick of The Independent observed that the Alliance had a "radical edge that harks back to the Highland Land League of a century ago." Although technically non-partisan, it received the formal endorsement of post-communist group Democratic Left Scotland, which "was committed to ... renew radical socialist politics" through the fledgling Scottish Parliament's proportional representation (PR) electoral system.

=== Policy outline ===
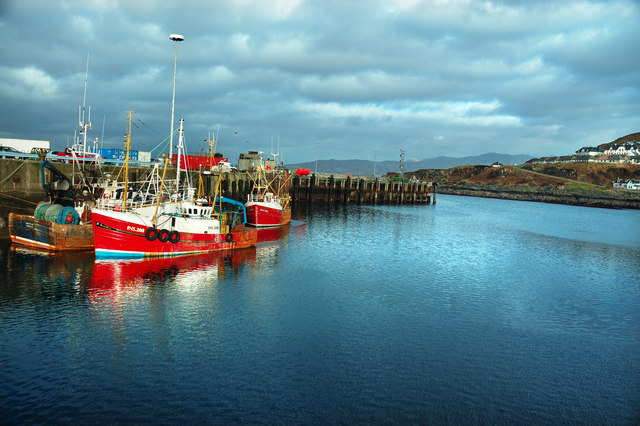
The Alliance favoured community ownership of Scottish fisheries.

Mann suggested that the group were promoting "positions rather than policies", with representatives not bound to act on legislation according to party instruction. They instead proposed that any Member of the Scottish Parliament (MSP) elected from the Alliance would consult their electorate on how to vote through the internet, namely via E-Mail, in what they hailed as a new form of "community democracy". Described by political scientists David Butler and Martin Westlake as "localised", the Alliance nonetheless developed a detailed regional policy platform "on the basis that the distinctive voice of [the Highlands and Islands] should be heard". This included the release of a publication, The Problems, in Fishing, Aquaculture, and the Marine Environment, authored by Edwin Stiven and printed in Glenelg. In it, Stiven recommends that fisheries in the west of Scotland should be free of all European Union (EU) influence and legal restrictions, advocating their complete return to community ownership; he further suggests management by sea trusts, similar to those established for crofts. Otherwise regarding the EU, the Alliance called for more funding to be directed towards "communities which have found themselves on the periphery of investment."

Domestically, the group pushed for the diversification of funding from central government to promote sustainable jobs, including the establishment of a separate, Scottish agricultural policy that prioritised land reform and redistribution initiatives. It further believed that attempted funding strategies in the Highlands and Islands were largely unworkable due to the lack of big business and investment, instead suggesting the formation of a regional Highland bank. Social policy proposals were similarly community-focused, and included support for affordable basic services and the upkeep of rural schools, namely preschools. Connected to this was the Alliance's proposal for a non-legislative assembly in which all of the region's parliamentarians (MPs, MEPs and MSPs) would convene and discuss policy development with their local constituents. The group also endorsed the founding of a watchdog to monitor the Highlands and Islands' quangos and public services.

Suggestions in transport included ending toll collections on the Skye Road Bridge, improving the region's ferry network, slashing fares for local public transport and establishing a community-owned airline; these measures were to be encompassed into the Alliance's "Right to Move" scheme. Nationally, the Alliance supported both the reduction of student tuition fees and the maintenance of British student grants. Regarding the continuation of the United Kingdom, it took a neutral stance, simply stating "a Scotland which is treated fairly is more likely to want to stay within the union." The Alliance are recorded as supporters of the Scottish Gaelic language.

=== Job-sharing platform ===
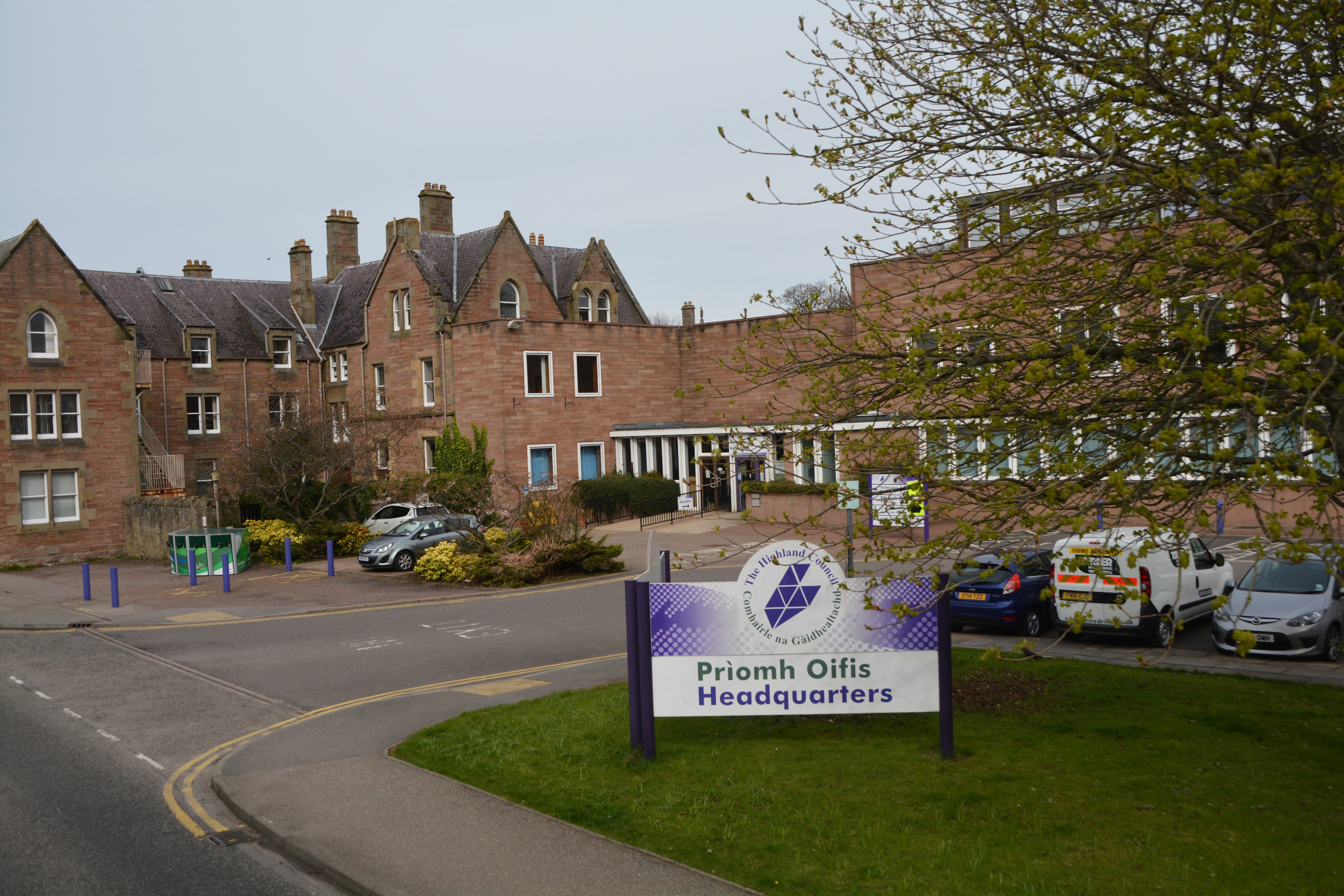
Lorraine Mann was involved in a legal dispute with the Highland Council (offices pictured) over political job-sharing.

The Alliance are perhaps best known for their controversial job-share candidacies. Such a proposal was suggested so that if the group were successful in obtaining a seat, the time a Holyrood representative would spend away from their rural constituents would not exceed a week, as they could interchange with their job-sharing partner. Fielding 20 candidates, the Alliance was the first British political party ever to achieve an absolute gender balance through its election nominations. Although each Alliance seat would be represented by two MSPs, the group insisted that they would share a single salary and expenses record.

Job-share proposals were eventually accepted by the Highland Council's Returning Officer, Arthur McCourt, in April 1999. This followed a four-month dispute between the Alliance and the Highland Council, under the authority of the Scottish Office, over the arrangement. However, it was revealed that McCourt was unaware of the job-share element, and subsequently deemed the nominations invalid. Lorraine Mann successfully took the case to an employment tribunal and the group fought the election on a job-sharing platform; that said, political scientist David Boothroyd speculates that the previously illegal status of their innovation lost them popularity. Legal support for job-sharing candidates was reversed at the Employment Appeal Tribunal in December 2000 as it was ruled the tribunal system had no jurisdiction over electoral law.

Under the advice of pressure group New Ways To Work, Mann then took the disagreement to another tribunal as a sex-discrimination suit under the Sex Discrimination Act 1975 in November 2001, where the council's decision was nonetheless upheld. The case has since been referenced by the parliamentary research papers of both the Northern Ireland Assembly and the British House of Commons, where it informed debate surrounding the Sex Discrimination (Election Candidates) Act 2002.

== Electoral performance ==
=== Scottish Parliament ===
1999 Scottish Parliament election
Electoral region	No. of votes	% of regional vote	% of national vote	Regional position	National position	Outcome
Highlands and Islands	2,607	1.3%	0.1%	8	11	No seats
