= Dumfries (Scottish Parliament constituency) =

Pre-2011 Scottish Parliament constituency

- Former county constituency for the Scottish Parliament
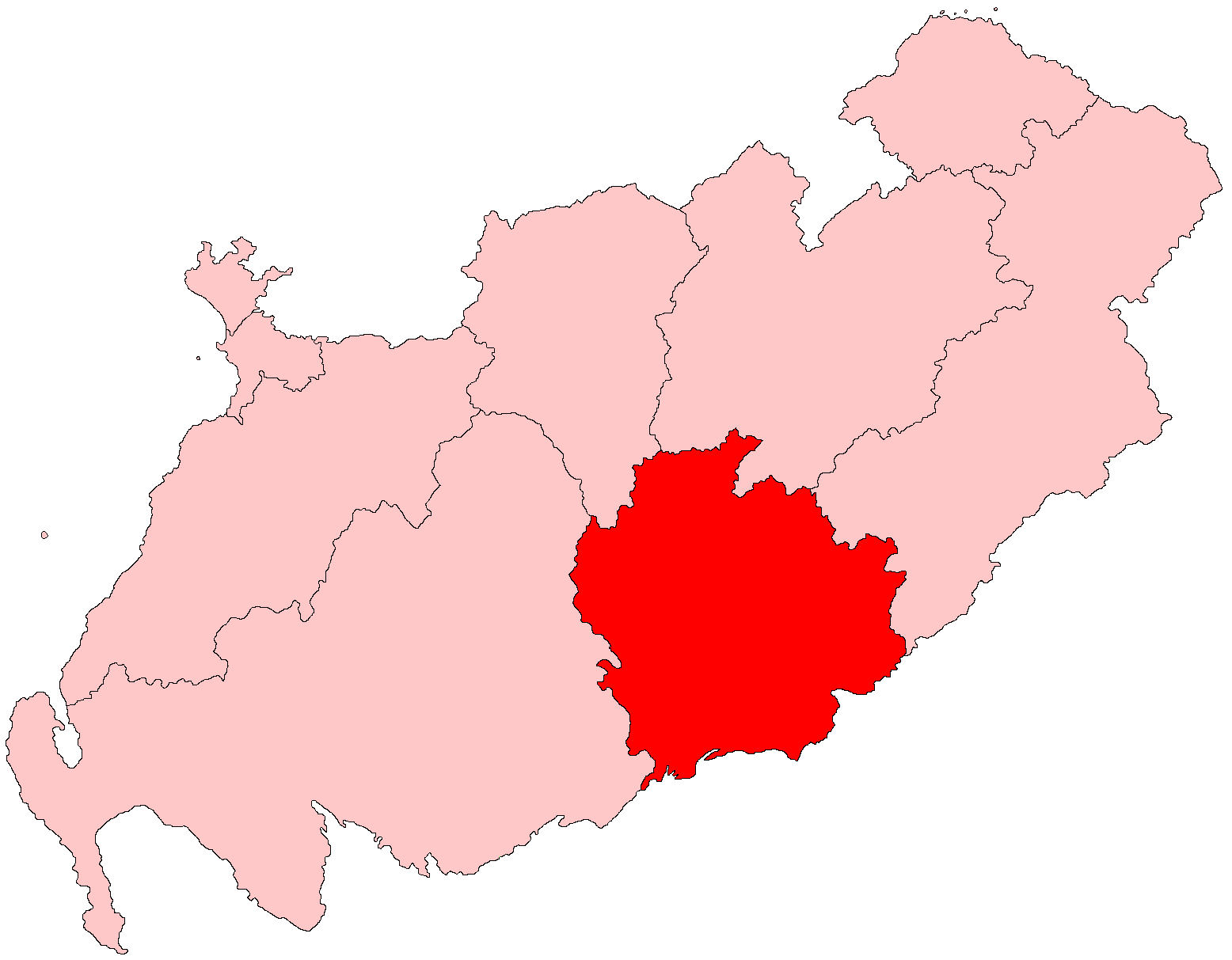

- Dumfries shown within the South of Scotland electoral region and the region shown within Scotland

Former constituency
- Created: 1999
- Abolished: 2011
- Council area: Dumfries and Galloway
- Replaced by: Dumfriesshire, Galloway and West Dumfries

Dumfries (dum-FREESS) was a constituency of the Scottish Parliament (Holyrood). It elected one Member of the Scottish Parliament (MSP) by the plurality (first past the post) method of election. It was also one of nine constituencies in the South of Scotland electoral region, which elects seven additional members, in addition to the nine constituency MSPs, to produce a form of proportional representation for the region as a whole.

From the Scottish Parliament election, 2011, the Dumfries constituency was abolished, with the city being divided between two new constituencies; Dumfriesshire, and Galloway and West Dumfries.

== Electoral region ==
See also South of Scotland (Scottish Parliament electoral region)

== Constituency boundaries and council area ==
The Dumfries constituency was created at the same time as the Scottish Parliament, in 1999, with the name and boundaries of an existing Westminster constituency. In 2005, however, Scottish Westminster constituencies were mostly replaced with new constituencies.

== Member of the Scottish Parliament ==
| Election | Member | Party |
|---|---|---|
| 1999 | Elaine Murray | Labour |
| 2011 | Constituency abolished: see Dumfriesshire and Galloway and West Dumfries | |

== Election results ==
2007 Scottish Parliament election: Dumfries
| Party | Candidate | Votes | % | ±% |
|---|---|---|---|---|
| Labour | Elaine Murray | 13,707 | 41.0 | +1.0 |
| Conservative | Murray Tosh | 10,860 | 32.5 | −4.1 |
| SNP | Michael Russell | 6,306 | 18.9 | +6.6 |
| Liberal Democrats | Lynne Hume | 2,538 | 7.6 | +0.1 |
| Majority | | 2,839 | 8.5 | +5.1 |
| Rejected ballots | | 1,006 | | |
| Turnout | | 33,419 | 53.5 | +1.3 |
| Labour hold | | Swing | +2.6 | |

2003 Scottish Parliament election: Dumfries
| Party | Candidate | Votes | % | ±% |
|---|---|---|---|---|
| Labour | Elaine Murray | 12,834 | 40.0 | +3.3 |
| Conservative | David Mundell | 11,738 | 36.6 | +9.4 |
| SNP | Andrew Wood | 3,931 | 12.3 | −7.5 |
| Liberal Democrats | Clare Humblen | 2394 | 7.5 | −8.7 |
| Scottish Socialist | John Dennis | 1213 | 3.8 | New |
| Majority | | 1,096 | 3.4 | −6.1 |
| Turnout | | 32,110 | 52.2 | |
| Labour hold | | Swing | | |

1999 Scottish Parliament election: Dumfries
| Party | Candidate | Votes | % | ±% |
|---|---|---|---|---|
| Labour | Elaine Murray | 14,101 | 36.7 | N/A |
| Conservative | David Mundell | 10,447 | 27.2 | N/A |
| SNP | Stephen Norris | 7,625 | 19.8 | N/A |
| Liberal Democrats | Iain Haughie | 6,209 | 16.2 | N/A |
| Majority | | 3,654 | 10.5 | N/A |
| Turnout | | 38,382 | | N/A |
| Labour win (new seat) | | | | |
