= Glasgow Kelvin (Scottish Parliament constituency) =

- Former burgh constituency for the Scottish Parliament

- Glasgow Kelvin shown within the Glasgow electoral region and the region shown within Scotland
- Population: 93,212 (2019)

Former constituency
- Created: 1999
- Abolished: 2026
- Council area: Glasgow City
- Replaced by: Glasgow Central, Glasgow Kelvin and Maryhill , Glasgow Anniesland, Glasgow Easterhouse and Springburn

Glasgow Kelvin (Gaelic: Glaschu Ceilbhinn) was a constituency of the Scottish Parliament, being one of eight constituencies within the Glasgow City council area. It elected one Member of the Scottish Parliament (MSP) by the plurality (first past the post) method of election. It was also one of nine constituencies in the Glasgow electoral region, which elects seven additional members, in addition to nine constituency MSPs, to produce a form of proportional representation for the region as a whole.

The seat had been held by Kaukab Stewart of the Scottish National Party from the 2021 Scottish Parliament election until its abolition.

As a result of the second periodic review of Scottish Parliament boundaries in 2025, the constituency was abolished ahead of the 2026 Scottish Parliament election. Most of Glasgow Kelvin became part of the new seats of Glasgow Central and Glasgow Kelvin and Maryhill, with small portions also being transferred to Glasgow Anniesland and Glasgow Easterhouse and Springburn.

== Electoral region ==
During the period Glasgow Kelvin was in existence, the other eight constituencies of the Glasgow region were: Glasgow Anniesland, Glasgow Cathcart, Glasgow Maryhill and Springburn, Glasgow Pollok, Glasgow Provan, Glasgow Shettleston, Glasgow Southside and Rutherglen.

During this period the region covered all of the Glasgow City council area and a north-western portion of the South Lanarkshire council area.

== Constituency boundaries ==
Map of boundaries from 2011

The Glasgow Kelvin constituency was created at the same time as the Scottish Parliament, for the 1999 Scottish Parliament election, using the name and boundaries of the existing Glasgow Kelvin constituency of the UK Parliament. Ahead of the 2005 United Kingdom general election, constituencies for the UK Parliament were altered, whilst the boundaries were initially retained for elections to the Scottish Parliament. There is now no link between the two sets of boundaries.

Following the first periodic review of Scottish Parliament boundaries, the boundaries of Glasgow Kelvin were revised for the 2011 Scottish Parliament election. The following electoral wards of Glasgow City Council were used to define Glasgow Kelvin at this review:

- In full: Anderston/City, Hillhead
- In part: Canal, Partick West

== Constituency profile ==
Glasgow city centre was in this constituency, including Kelvingrove Art Gallery, the cathedral, and the SEC Centre. All three of Glasgow's universities were here as well, making it reputedly the most educated constituency in Scotland; the large student population was an important factor in elections. It was also home to the Merchant City: described as 'yuppie housing', built out of the disused cotton and tobacco warehouses. This area was a symbol of the rebirth of the city, and Kelvin was arguably the most affluent constituency in Glasgow, although it also included more deprived areas.

== History ==
The predecessor to the Westminster constituency seat, Glasgow Hillhead, was the last Conservative seat in the city until Roy Jenkins won it for the Social Democratic Party at a by-election in 1982. He held it in 1983 general election but it was taken by Labour's George Galloway in 1987.

== Member of the Scottish Parliament ==
| Election | Member | Party |
|---|---|---|
| 1999 | Pauline McNeill | Labour |
| 2011 | Sandra White | SNP |
| 2021 | Kaukab Stewart | SNP |

== Election results ==
=== Elections in the 2020s ===
2021 Scottish Parliament election: Glasgow Kelvin
| Party | Candidate | Constituency | | | Regional | | |
| Party | Candidate | Votes | % | ±% | Votes | % | ±% |
|---|---|---|---|---|---|---|---|
| SNP | Kaukab Stewart | 14,535 | 40.3 | ▲1.8 | 14,227 | 39.4 | ▲2.8 |
| Green | Patrick Harvie (Note: Incumbent member on the party list, or for another constituency) | 9,077 | 25.2 | ▲0.9 | 7,568 | 21.0 | ▲0.8 |
| Labour | Pam Duncan-Glancy (Note: Elected on the party list) | 8,605 | 23.9 | ▲2.9 | 7,279 | 20.2 | ▲1.3 |
| Conservative | Grahame Cannell | 2,850 | 7.9 | ▼3.9 | 3,910 | 10.8 | ▼2.2 |
| Liberal Democrats | David McKenzie | 977 | 2.7 | ▼1.0 | 1,049 | 2.9 | ▼0.4 |
| Alba | | | | | 613 | 1.7 | New |
| Independent Green Voice | | | | | 256 | 0.7 | New |
| All for Unity | | | | | 254 | 0.7 | New |
| Scottish Family | | | | | 179 | 0.5 | New |
| Women's Equality | | | | | 145 | 0.4 | ▼1.6 |
| Freedom Alliance (UK) | | | | | 136 | 0.4 | New |
| Communist | | | | | 103 | 0.3 | New |
| Reform | | | | | 78 | 0.2 | New |
| TUSC | | | | | 77 | 0.2 | New |
| Scottish Libertarian | | | | | 57 | 0.2 | New |
| Abolish the Scottish Parliament | | | | | 56 | 0.2 | New |
| Independent | Craig Ross | | | | 26 | 0.1 | New |
| Reclaim | | | | | 25 | 0.1 | New |
| UKIP | | | | | 25 | 0.1 | ▼1.2 |
| SDP | | | | | 21 | 0.1 | New |
| Independent | Daniel Donaldson | | | | 12 | 0.03 | New |
| Renew | | | | | 8 | 0.02 | New |
| Majority | | 5,458 | 15.1 | ▲0.9 | | | |
| Valid votes | | 36,044 | | | 36,104 | | |
| Invalid votes | | 185 | | | 96 | | |
| Turnout | | 36,229 | 54.54 | ▲8.6 | 36,200 | 54.50 | ▲8.6 |
| SNP hold | | Swing | | ▲0.5 | | | |

=== Elections in the 2010s ===
In 2016 the Scottish Greens overtook Scottish Labour to take second place in the Glasgow Kelvin constituency on the constituency element of the vote. This was their best ever first past the post election result, with party co-convenor Patrick Harvie finishing behind the SNP's Sandra White by 14.2% of the vote.

2016 Scottish Parliament election: Glasgow Kelvin
| Party | Candidate | Constituency | | | Regional | | |
| Party | Candidate | Votes | % | ±% | Votes | % | ±% |
|---|---|---|---|---|---|---|---|
| SNP | Sandra White (Note: Incumbent member for this constituency) | 10,964 | 38.5 | ▼4.8 | 10,416 | 36.6 | ▼0.6 |
| Green | Patrick Harvie (Note: Incumbent member on the party list, or for another constituency) | 6,916 | 24.3 | New | 5,760 | 20.2 | ▲4.8 |
| Labour | Michael Shanks | 5,968 | 21.0 | ▼18.8 | 5,373 | 18.9 | ▼8.1 |
| Conservative | Sheila Mechan | 3,346 | 11.8 | ▲4.2 | 3,701 | 13.0 | ▲6.0 |
| Liberal Democrats | Carole Ford | 1,050 | 3.7 | ▼4.0 | 945 | 3.3 | ▼1.6 |
| Independent | Tom Muirhead | 198 | 0.7 | ▼1.0 | | | |
| Women's Equality | | | | | 573 | 2.0 | New |
| RISE | | | | | 506 | 1.8 | New |
| UKIP | | | | | 367 | 1.3 | ▲0.6 |
| Solidarity | | | | | 234 | 0.8 | New |
| Animal Welfare | | | | | 231 | 0.8 | New |
| BUP | | | | | 160 | 0.6 | New |
| Scottish Christian | | | | | 158 | 0.6 | ▼0.1 |
| Independent | Andrew McCullagh | | | | 40 | 0.1 | New |
| Majority | | 4,048 | 14.2 | ▲10.7 | | | |
| Valid votes | | 28,442 | | | 28,464 | | |
| Invalid votes | | 113 | | | 87 | | |
| Turnout | | 28,555 | 45.9 | ▲5.8 | 28,551 | 45.9 | ▲5.8 |
| SNP hold | | Swing | | ▼14.6 | | | |
Notes

2011 Scottish Parliament election: Glasgow Kelvin
| Party | Candidate | Constituency | | | Regional | | |
| Party | Candidate | Votes | % | ±% | Votes | % | ±% |
|---|---|---|---|---|---|---|---|
| SNP | Sandra White (Note: Incumbent member on the party list, or for another constituency) | 10,640 | 43.3 | N/A | 8,867 | 35.9 | N/A |
| Labour | Pauline McNeill (Note: Incumbent member for this constituency) | 9,758 | 39.8 | N/A | 6,662 | 27.0 | N/A |
| Green | | | | | 3,820 | 15.5 | N/A |
| Conservative | Ruth Davidson (Note: Elected on the party list) | 1,845 | 7.5 | N/A | 1,732 | 7.0 | N/A |
| Liberal Democrats | Natalie McKee | 1,900 | 7.7 | N/A | 1,225 | 5.0 | N/A |
| Respect | | | | | 985 | 4.0 | N/A |
| Independent | Tom Muirhead | 405 | 1.6 | N/A | | | |
| Scottish Socialist | | | | | 247 | 1.0 | N/A |
| All-Scotland Pensioners Party | | | | | 204 | 0.8 | N/A |
| Socialist Labour | | | | | 187 | 0.8 | N/A |
| Scottish Christian | | | | | 160 | 0.6 | N/A |
| UKIP | | | | | 160 | 0.6 | N/A |
| BNP | | | | | 157 | 0.6 | N/A |
| Pirate | | | | | 136 | 0.6 | N/A |
| Scottish Unionist | | | | | 74 | 0.3 | N/A |
| Independent | Caroline Johnstone | | | | 34 | 0.1 | N/A |
| Scottish Homeland Party | | | | | 19 | 0.1 | N/A |
| Majority | | 882 | 3.5 | N/A | | | |
| Valid votes | | 24,548 | | | 24,669 | | |
| Invalid votes | | 246 | | | 135 | | |
| Turnout | | 24,794 | 40.1 | N/A | 24,804 | 40.1 | N/A |
| SNP win (new boundaries) | | | | | | | |

=== Elections in the 2000s ===
2007 Scottish Parliament election: Glasgow Kelvin
| Party | Candidate | Votes | % | ±% |
|---|---|---|---|---|
| Labour | Pauline McNeill | 7,875 | 33.5 | −2.2 |
| SNP | Sandra White | 6,668 | 28.4 | +7.6 |
| Green | Martin Bartos | 2,971 | 12.6 | New |
| Liberal Democrats | Katy Gordon | 2,843 | 12.1 | −3.0 |
| Conservative | Brian Cooklin | 1,943 | 8.3 | +0.1 |
| Independent | Niall Walker | 744 | 3.2 | New |
| Scottish Christian | Isobel Macleod | 456 | 1.9 | New |
| Majority | | 1,207 | 5.1 | −9.8 |
| Turnout | | 23,500 | 42.7 | +3.3 |
| Labour hold | | Swing | | |

2003 Scottish Parliament election: Glasgow Kelvin
| Party | Candidate | Votes | % | ±% |
|---|---|---|---|---|
| Labour | Pauline McNeill | 7,880 | 35.7 | −9.1 |
| SNP | Sandra White | 4,591 | 20.8 | −8.5 |
| Liberal Democrats | Douglas Herbison | 3,334 | 15.1 | +2.0 |
| Scottish Socialist | Andy Harvey | 3,159 | 14.3 | +9.5 |
| Conservative | Gawain Towler | 1,816 | 8.2 | +0.3 |
| Independent Green Voice | Alistair McConnachie | 1,300 | 5.9 | New |
| Majority | | 3,289 | 14.9 | −0.6 |
| Turnout | | 22,080 | 39.4 | −6.7 |
| Labour hold | | Swing | | |

=== Elections in the 1990s ===
1999 Scottish Parliament election: Glasgow Kelvin
| Party | Candidate | Votes | % |
|---|---|---|---|
| Labour | Pauline McNeill | 12,711 | 44.8 |
| SNP | Sandra White | 8,303 | 29.3 |
| Liberal Democrats | Moira Craig | 3,720 | 13.1 |
| Conservative | Assad Rasul | 2,253 | 7.9 |
| Scottish Socialist | Heather Ritchie | 1,375 | 4.8 |
| Majority | | 4,408 | 15.5 |
| Turnout | | 28,362 | 46.1 |
| Labour win (new seat) | | | |

== See also ==
- Politics of Glasgow
