= Glasgow Govan (Scottish Parliament constituency) =

Region or constituency of the Scottish Parliament

- Former burgh constituency for the Scottish Parliament

- Glasgow Govan shown within the Glasgow electoral region and the region shown within Scotland

Former constituency
- Created: 1999
- Abolished: 2011
- Council area: Glasgow City (part) Renfrewshire (part)

Glasgow Govan was a constituency of the Scottish Parliament (Holyrood). It elected one Member of the Scottish Parliament (MSP) by the plurality (first past the post) method of election.

For the 2011 election, the constituency was abolished. The Govan electoral ward was divided between Glasgow Pollok and Glasgow Southside.

== Electoral region ==
The region covered the Glasgow City council area and a north-western portion of the South Lanarkshire council area.

== Constituency boundaries and council areas ==
The Glasgow Govan constituency was created at the same time as the Scottish Parliament, in 1999, with the name and boundaries of an existing Westminster constituency. In 2005, however, Scottish Westminster (House of Commons) constituencies were mostly replaced with new constituencies.

The Holyrood constituency covered a western portion of the Glasgow City council and small western portion of Renfrewshire Council.

Glasgow Govan was south of the Kelvin constituency, west of Shettleston and north of Cathcart and Pollok, which were all entirely within the city area.

== Boundary review ==
Following the First Periodic review into constituencies of the Scottish Parliament for the 2011 election, the Boundary Commission for Scotland recommended the abolition of the Glasgow Govan constituency. The seat created is known as Glasgow Southside formed by the combination of Southside Central, and Pollokshields wards with the addition of the eastern half of the Govan division.

== Member of the Scottish Parliament ==
The former First Minister, Nicola Sturgeon, represented the constituency from the 2007 election. She was previously an MSP for the Glasgow regional list from 1999 to 2007, during which time she was Leader of the Opposition at Holyrood from 2004 to 2007.

Election	Member	Party
1999	Gordon Jackson	Labour
2007	Nicola Sturgeon	Scottish National Party
2011	Constituency abolished; see Glasgow Cathcart, Glasgow Pollok and Glasgow Southside	

== Election results ==
2007 Scottish Parliament election: Glasgow Govan
Party	Candidate	Votes	%	±%
SNP	Nicola Sturgeon	9,010	41.9	+10.7
Labour	Gordon Jackson	8,266	38.4	+1.3
Liberal Democrats	Chris Young	1,891	8.8	+0.3
Conservative	Martyn McIntyre	1,680	7.8	−1.1
Independent	Asif Nasir	423	2.0	New
Communist	Elinor McKenzie	251	1.2	New
Majority		744	3.5	N/A
Turnout		22,741	45.4	+1.9
Rejected ballots		1,220	5.36	
SNP gain from Labour		Swing	+4.7	

2003 Scottish Parliament election: Glasgow Govan
Party	Candidate	Votes	%	±%
Labour	Gordon Jackson	7,834	37.06	−6.25
SNP	Nicola Sturgeon	6,599	31.22	−5.43
Scottish Socialist	Jimmy Scott	2,369	11.21	+6.38
Conservative	Faisal Butt	1,878	8.89	+0.01
Liberal Democrats	Paul Graham	1,807	8.55	+2.94
Majority		1,235	5.84	−0.82
Turnout		21,136	43.46	−6.06
Labour hold		Swing		

1999 Scottish Parliament election: Glasgow Govan
Party	Candidate	Votes	%	±%
Labour	Gordon Jackson	11,421	43.31	N/A
SNP	Nicola Sturgeon	9,665	36.65	N/A
Conservative	Tasmina Ahmed-Sheikh	2,343	8.88	N/A
Liberal Democrats	Mohammed Aslam Khan	1,479	5.61	N/A
Scottish Socialist	Charlie McCarthy	1,275	4.83	N/A
Communist	John Foster	190	0.72	N/A
Majority		1,756	6.66	N/A
Turnout		26,373	49.52	N/A
Labour win (new seat)				

== See also ==
- Politics of Scotland

== Footnotes ==
- Rejected ballots for 2007 election, BBC News

Preceded by Aberdeen South	Constituency represented by the Deputy First Minister of Scotland; 2007–2011	Succeeded by Glasgow Southside
