= Gordon Jackson (advocate) =

British politician (born 1948)

Gordon Jackson KC

Member of the Scottish Parliament for Glasgow Govan
- In office 6 May 1999 – 2 April 2007
- Preceded by: Constituency created
- Succeeded by: Nicola Sturgeon

Personal details
- Born: William Gordon Jackson; 5 August 1948 (age 78) Ardrossan, Scotland
- Party: Labour
- Spouse: Anne Stevely (m. 1972)
- Education: University of St Andrews
- Profession: Advocate

William Gordon Jackson KC (born 5 August 1948) is a senior Scottish lawyer who served as Dean of the Faculty of Advocates from 2016 until 2020. From 1999 to 2007, he was a Scottish Labour Party Member of the Scottish Parliament (MSP) for Glasgow Govan.

== Early life ==
Jackson was educated at Ardrossan Academy and studied law at the University of St Andrews. He was admitted to the Faculty of Advocates in 1979 and served as an Advocate Depute from 1987 to 1990. He was called to the Bar of England and Wales (Lincoln's Inn) in 1979, and appointed Queen's Counsel in Scotland in 1990.

== Political career ==
Jackson was elected to the Scottish Parliament in the 1999 election representing Glasgow Govan. While serving as a member, he continued to undertake work at the Bar, provoking criticism in some quarters. He was reputedly nicknamed "Crackerjack", for repeatedly arriving at Parliament just before the 5 pm vote; the name was a reference to the children's programme, Crackerjack, which famously started at 4:55 pm. He was defeated in the 2007 election by then-Scottish National Party Depute Leader Nicola Sturgeon.

== Legal career ==
Jackson continues to practise at the Scottish Bar. At one time he was tipped to become a Senator of the College of Justice by the Sunday Herald.

In 2016, he became Dean of the Faculty of Advocates. He was the lead defence counsel in the trial of Alex Salmond, who was acquitted of all charges. On 3 April 2020, Jackson announced his intention to resign as Dean of Faculty with effect from 30 June 2020 at the latest. This followed reports that Jackson had self-reported himself to the Scottish Legal Complaints Commission after footage of him was published in which he appeared to name two of the women who alleged sexual assaults by Alex Salmond, in contravention of rules that protect the anonymity of complainers. Jackson was found guilty of professional misconduct.

== Personal life ==
He is an Honorary Vice-President of English-Speaking Union Scotland.

Scottish Parliament
New constituency	Member of the Scottish Parliament for Glasgow Govan; 1999–2007	Succeeded by Nicola Sturgeon
