= 1999 Scottish Parliament election =

- 6 May 1999

All 129 seats to the Scottish Parliament 65 seats were needed for a majority
- Opinion polls
- Registered: 4,027,433
- Turnout: Constituency - 58.4% Regional - 58.3%
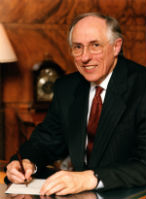

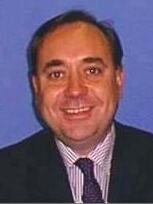

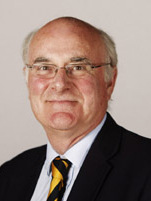

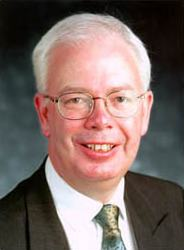

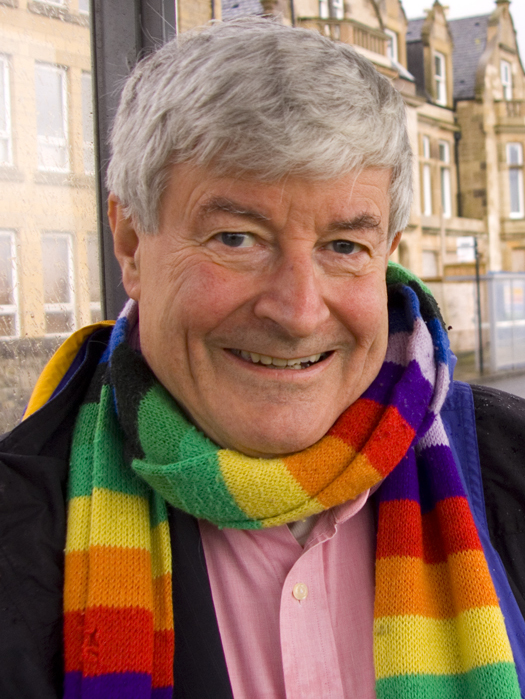

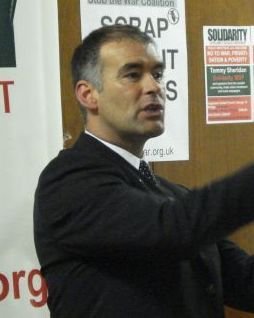
	First party	Second party	Third party
Leader	Donald Dewar	Alex Salmond	David McLetchie
Party	Labour	SNP	Conservative
Leader since	19 September 1998	22 September 1990	6 September 1998
Leader's seat	Glasgow Anniesland	Banff and Buchan	Lothians
Seats won	56 (Note: Includes 9 MSPs sponsored by the Co-operative Party, who are designated Labour and Co-operative.)	35	18
Constituency vote	908,346	672,768	364,425
Percentage	38.8%	28.7%	15.6%
Regional vote	786,818	638,644	359,109
Percentage	33.6%	27.3%	15.4%
	Fourth party	Fifth party	Sixth party
Leader	Jim Wallace	Robin Harper	Tommy Sheridan
Party	Liberal Democrats	Green	Scottish Socialist
Leader since	18 April 1992	1990	1998
Leader's seat	Orkney	Lothians	Glasgow
Seats won	17	1	1
Constituency vote	333,179	Did not contest	23,654
Percentage	14.2%	Did not contest	1.0%
Regional vote	290,760	84,023	46,635
Percentage	12.4%	3.6%	2.0%
- The map shows the election results in single-member constituencies. The additional-member MSPs in the 8 regions are shown around the map.
First Minister and Government after election
Donald Dewar (Labour)
Labour–Liberal Democrats

The first election to the devolved Scottish Parliament, to fill 129 seats, took place on 6 May 1999. Following the election, the Labour Party and the Liberal Democrats formed the Scottish Executive, with Labour Member of the Scottish Parliament (MSP) Donald Dewar becoming First Minister.

The Scottish Parliament was created after a referendum on devolution took place on 11 September 1997 in which 74.3% of those who voted approved the idea. The Scotland Act (1998) was then passed by the UK Parliament which established the devolved Scottish Parliament and Scottish Executive. The parliament was elected using mixed-member proportional representation, combining 73 (First-past-the-post) constituencies (Note: The same constituency boundaries were used as in the 1997 United Kingdom general election with the exception of Orkney and Shetland, which were made into separate constituencies.) and proportional representation with the 73 constituencies being grouped together to make eight regions each electing seven additional members to make a total of 129. This meant that it would be unlikely for any party to gain a majority of seats in the new parliament and either minority or coalition Scottish Executives would have to be formed.

The first general election to the Scottish Parliament overall produced few surprises with the Labour Party still enjoying high popularity following their landslide victory in the 1997 UK general election as widely expected was the largest party winning 56 seats, mostly in their traditional Central Belt heartlands, which was nine seats short of an overall majority. Labour formed a coalition government with the Liberal Democrats, who won 17 seats.

The Scottish National Party (SNP) had done well in opinion polls running up to the election, gaining 40% in some approval ratings, but this level of support was not maintained. The SNP were the second largest party with 35 seats, which still represented their best performance since the October 1974 general election. The Conservative Party, still recovering from their wipeout in the 1997 general election across Scotland, failed to win a single constituency seat but did win 18 seats through the additional-member system.

The Scottish Socialist Party (SSP) and the Greens picked up unexpected additional-member seats. Robin Harper became the first ever elected Green parliamentarian in the history of the United Kingdom. Dennis Canavan, who had failed to become an approved Labour candidate, won the Falkirk West constituency as an independent candidate.

Following the election the new parliament met in the General Assembly Hall of the Church of Scotland in Edinburgh for the first time on Wednesday 12 May 1999, although the actual devolution of powers from Westminster to the Scottish Parliament did not take place until midnight on Thursday 1 July 1999, almost two months later.

For a full list of MSPs elected, see 1st Scottish Parliament. For lists of constituencies and regions, see Scottish Parliament constituencies and electoral regions.

== Results ==
Election result with constituency names labeled

Party	Constituency			Regional			Total seats
Party	Votes	%	Seats	Votes	%	Seats	Total seats
Labour	908,346	38.78	53	786,818	33.64	3	56
Scottish National Party	672,768	28.72	7	638,644	27.31	28	35
Conservatives	364,425	15.56	0	359,109	15.35	18	18
Liberal Democrats	333,179	14.22	12	290,760	12.43	5	17
Green				84,023	3.59	1	1
Scottish Socialist Party	23,654	1.01	0	46,635	1.99	1	1
Socialist Labour Party	5,268	0.22	0	55,232	2.36	0	0
ProLife Alliance				9,784	0.42	0	0
Scottish Unionist Party				7,011	0.30	0	0
Liberal Party				5,534	0.24	0	0
Natural Law Party				4,906	0.21	0	0
Socialist Workers Party	2,757	0.12	0				0
Highlands and Islands Alliance				2,607	0.11	0	0
UK Independence Party				1,502	0.06	0	0
Scottish Families and Pensioners Party	358	0.02	0	1,373	0.06	0	0
Adam Lyal's Witchery Tour Party				1,184	0.05	0	0
Scottish People's Mission				1,151	0.05	0	0
Civil Rights Movement				806	0.03	0	0
Communist Party of Britain	190	0.01	0	521	0.02	0	0
Socialist Party of Great Britain				697	0.03	0	0
Braveheart Party	191	0.01	0	557	0.02	0	0
Humanist Party				447	0.02	0	0
Anti-Drug Party	423	0.02	0				0
Anti-Corruption Party				54	0.00	0	0
Independents	30,929	1.32	1	39,557	1.69	0	1
Total	2,342,488	100.00	73	2,338,912	100.00	56	129
Valid votes	2,342,488	99.67		2,338,912	99.69		
Invalid/blank votes	7,839	0.33		7,268	0.31		
Total votes	2,350,327	100.00		2,346,180	100.00		
Registered voters/turnout	4,027,433	58.36		4,027,433	58.25		
Source: Scottish Parliament, BBC

Popular Vote (Constituency)
Labour	38.77%
SNP	28.72%
Conservative	15.56%
Liberal Democrats	14.22%
Scottish Socialist	1.01%
Other	1.72%

Popular Vote (Regional)
Labour	33.64%
SNP	27.26%
Conservative	15.35%
Liberal Democrats	12.43%
Green	3.59%
Socialist Labour	2.37%
Scottish Socialist	1.99%
Other	3.37%

Parliament seats
Labour	43.41%
SNP	27.13%
Conservative	13.95%
Liberal Democrats	13.18%
Green	0.78%
Scottish Socialist	0.78%
Other	0.78%

== Constituency and regional summary ==
=== Central Scotland ===
1999 Scottish Parliament election: Central Scotland
Constituency	Elected member	Result
Airdrie and Shotts	Karen Whitefield	Scottish Labour win (new seat)
Coatbridge and Chryston	Elaine Smith	Scottish Labour win (new seat)
Cumbernauld and Kilsyth	Cathie Craigie	Scottish Labour win (new seat)
East Kilbride	Andy Kerr	Scottish Labour win (new seat)
Falkirk East	Cathy Peattie	Scottish Labour win (new seat)
Falkirk West	Dennis Canavan	Independent win (new seat)
Hamilton North and Bellshill	Michael McMahon	Scottish Labour win (new seat)
Hamilton South	Tom McCabe	Scottish Labour win (new seat)
Kilmarnock and Loudoun	Margaret Jamieson	Scottish Labour win (new seat)
Motherwell and Wishaw	Jack McConnell	Scottish Labour win (new seat)

1999 Scottish Parliament election: Central Scotland
Party	Elected candidates	Seats	+/−	Votes	%	+/−%
Labour		0	N/A	129,822	39.28	N/A
SNP	Alex Neil; Andrew Wilson; Michael Matheson; Gil Paterson; Linda Fabiani	5	N/A	91,802	27.78	N/A
Conservative	Lyndsay McIntosh	1	N/A	30,243	9.15	N/A
Independent		0	N/A	27,700	8.38	N/A
Liberal Democrats	Donald Gorrie	1	N/A	20,505	6.20	N/A
Socialist Labour		0	N/A	10,956	3.32	N/A
Green		0	N/A	5,926	3.32	N/A
Scottish Socialist		0	N/A	5,739	1.74	N/A
Scottish Unionist Party (modern)		0	N/A	2,888	0.87	N/A
ProLife Alliance		0	N/A	2,567	0.78	N/A
Scottish Families and Pensioners Party		0	N/A	1,373	0.42	N/A
Natural Law		0	N/A	1,373	0.42	N/A
Independent Progressive		0	N/A	248	0.08	N/A

=== Glasgow ===
1999 Scottish Parliament election: Glasgow
Constituency	Elected member	Result
Glasgow Anniesland	Donald Dewar	Scottish Labour win (new seat)
Glasgow Baillieston	Margaret Curran	Scottish Labour win (new seat)
Glasgow Cathcart	Mike Watson	Scottish Labour win (new seat)
Glasgow Govan	Gordon Jackson	Scottish Labour win (new seat)
Glasgow Kelvin	Pauline McNeill	Scottish Labour win (new seat)
Glasgow Maryhill	Patricia Ferguson	Scottish Labour win (new seat)
Glasgow Pollok	Johann Lamont	Scottish Labour win (new seat)
Glasgow Rutherglen	Janis Hughes	Scottish Labour win (new seat)
Glasgow Shettleston	Frank McAveety	Scottish Labour win (new seat)
Glasgow Springburn	Paul Martin	Scottish Labour win (new seat)

1999 Scottish Parliament election: Glasgow
Party	Elected candidates	Seats	+/−	Votes	%	+/−%
Labour		0	N/A	112,588	43.9	N/A
SNP	Nicola Sturgeon; Dorothy-Grace Elder; Kenneth Gibson; Sandra White	4	N/A	65,360	25.5	N/A
Conservative	Bill Aitken	1	N/A	20,239	7.9	N/A
Scottish Socialist	Tommy Sheridan	1	N/A	18,581	7.2	N/A
Liberal Democrats	Robert Brown	1	N/A	18,473	7.2	N/A
Green		0	N/A	10,159	4.0	N/A
Socialist Labour		0	N/A	4,391	1.7	N/A
ProLife Alliance		0	N/A	2,357	0.9	N/A
Scottish Unionist		0	N/A	2,283	0.9	N/A
Communist		0	N/A	521	0.2	N/A
Humanist		0	N/A	447	0.2	N/A
Natural Law		0	N/A	419	0.2	N/A
Socialist (GB)		0	N/A	309	0.1	N/A
People's Choice		0	N/A	221	0.1	N/A

=== Highlands and Islands ===
1999 Scottish Parliament election: Highlands and Islands
Constituency	Elected member	Result
Argyll and Bute	George Lyon	Scottish Liberal Democrats win (new seat)
Caithness, Sutherland and Easter Ross	Jamie Stone	Scottish Liberal Democrats win (new seat)
Inverness East, Nairn and Lochaber	Fergus Ewing	Scottish National Party win (new seat)
Moray	Margaret Ewing	Scottish National Party win (new seat)
Orkney	Jim Wallace	Scottish Liberal Democrats win (new seat)
Ross, Skye and Inverness West	John Farquhar Munro	Scottish Liberal Democrats win (new seat)
Shetland	Tavish Scott	Scottish Liberal Democrats win (new seat)
Western Isles	Alasdair Morrison	Scottish Labour win (new seat)

1999 Scottish Parliament election: Highlands and Islands
Party	Elected candidates	Seats	+/−	Votes	%	+/−%
SNP	Winnie Ewing; Duncan Hamilton	2	N/A	55,593	27.73	N/A
Labour	Peter Peacock; Maureen Macmillan; Rhoda Grant	3	N/A	51,371	25.47	N/A
Liberal Democrats		0	N/A	43,226	21.43	N/A
Conservative	Jamie McGrigor; Mary Scanlon	2	N/A	30,122	14.94	N/A
Green		0	N/A	7,560	3.75	N/A
I Noble (Independent)		0	N/A	3,522	1.75	N/A
Socialist Labour		0	N/A	2,808	1.39	N/A
Highlands and Islands		0	N/A	2,607	1.29	N/A
Scottish Socialist Party		0	N/A	1,770	0.88	N/A
Robbie the Pict (Independent)		0	N/A	1,151	0.57	N/A
Independent		0	N/A	712	0.35	N/A
Natural Law		0	N/A	536	0.27	N/A
Independent		0	N/A	354	0.18	N/A

=== Lothians ===
1999 Scottish Parliament election: Lothians
Constituency	Elected member	Result
Edinburgh Central	Sarah Boyack	Scottish Labour win (new seat)
Edinburgh East and Musselburgh	Susan Deacon	Scottish Labour win (new seat)
Edinburgh North and Leith	Malcolm Chisholm	Scottish Labour win (new seat)
Edinburgh Pentlands	Iain Gray	Scottish Labour win (new seat)
Edinburgh South	Angus Mackay	Scottish Labour win (new seat)
Edinburgh West	Margaret Smith	Scottish Liberal Democrats win (new seat)
Linlithgow	Mary Mulligan	Scottish Labour win (new seat)
Livingston	Bristow Muldoon	Scottish Labour win (new seat)
Midlothian	Rhona Brankin	Scottish Labour win (new seat)

1999 Scottish Parliament election: Lothians
Party	Elected candidates	Seats	+/−	Votes	%	+/−%
Labour		0	N/A	99,098	30.2	N/A
SNP	Margo MacDonald; Kenny MacAskill; Fiona Hyslop	3	N/A	85,085	25.7	N/A
Conservative	David McLetchie; James Douglas-Hamilton	2	N/A	52,067	15.7	N/A
Liberal Democrats	David Steel	1	N/A	47,565	14.4	N/A
Green	Robin Harper	1	N/A	22,848	6.9	N/A
Socialist Labour		0	N/A	10,895	3.3	N/A
Scottish Socialist		0	N/A	5,237	1.6	N/A
Liberal		0	N/A	2,056	0.6	N/A
Witchery Tour Party		0	N/A	1,184	0.4	N/A
ProLife Alliance		0	N/A	898	0.3	N/A
Civil Rights Movement		0	N/A	806	0.2	N/A
Natural Law		0	N/A	564	0.2	N/A
Independent		0	N/A	557	0.2	N/A
Socialist (GB)		0	N/A	388	0.1	N/A
Independent		0	N/A	256	0.1	N/A
Independent		0	N/A	145	0.04	N/A
Independent		0	N/A	54	0.02	N/A

=== Mid Scotland and Fife ===
1999 Scottish Parliament election: Mid Scotland and Fife
Constituency	Elected member	Result
Dunfermline East	Helen Eadie	Scottish Labour win (new seat)
Dunfermline West	Scott Barrie	Scottish Labour win (new seat)
Fife Central	Henry McLeish	Scottish Labour win (new seat)
Fife North East	Iain Smith	Scottish Liberal Democrats win (new seat)
Kirkcaldy	Marilyn Livingstone	Scottish Labour win (new seat)
North Tayside	John Swinney	Scottish National Party win (new seat)
Ochil	Richard Simpson	Scottish Labour win (new seat)
Perth	Roseanna Cunningham	Scottish National Party win (new seat)
Stirling	Sylvia Jackson	Scottish Labour win (new seat)

1999 Scottish Parliament election: Mid Scotland and Fife
Party	Elected candidates	Seats	+/−	Votes	%	+/−%
Labour		0	N/A	101,964	33.3	N/A
SNP	George Reid; Bruce Crawford; Tricia Marwick	3	N/A	87,659	28.7	N/A
Conservative	Keith Harding; Nick Johnston; Brian Monteith	3	N/A	56,719	18.6	N/A
Liberal Democrats	Keith Raffan	1	N/A	38,896	12.7	N/A
Green		0	N/A	11,821	3.9	N/A
Socialist Labour		0	N/A	4,266	1.4	N/A
Scottish Socialist		0	N/A	3,044	1.0	N/A
ProLife Alliance		0	N/A	735	0.2	N/A
Natural Law		0	N/A	558	0.2	N/A

=== North East Scotland ===
1999 Scottish Parliament election: North East Scotland
Constituency	Elected member	Result
Aberdeen Central	Lewis Macdonald	Scottish Labour win (new seat)
Aberdeen North	Elaine Thomson	Scottish Labour win (new seat)
Aberdeen South	Nicol Stephen	Scottish Liberal Democrats win (new seat)
Angus	Andrew Welsh	Scottish National Party win (new seat)
Banff and Buchan	Alex Salmond	Scottish National Party win (new seat)
Dundee East	John McAllion	Scottish Labour win (new seat)
Dundee West	Kate Maclean	Scottish Labour win (new seat)
Gordon	Nora Radcliffe	Scottish Liberal Democrats win (new seat)
West Aberdeenshire and Kincardine	Mike Rumbles	Scottish Liberal Democrats win (new seat)

1999 Scottish Parliament election: North East Scotland
Party	Elected candidates	Seats	+/−	Votes	%	+/−%
SNP	Brian Adam; Richard Lochhead; Shona Robison; Irene McGugan	4	N/A	93,329	32.3	N/A
Labour		0	N/A	72,666	25.5	N/A
Conservative	David Davidson; Ben Wallace; Alex Johnstone	3	N/A	52,149	18.3	N/A
Liberal Democrats		0	N/A	49,843	17.5	N/A
Green		0	N/A	8,067	2.8	N/A
Socialist Labour		0	N/A	3,557	1.2	N/A
Scottish Socialist		0	N/A	3,016	1.1	N/A
Independent		0	N/A	2,303	0.8	N/A
Independent		0	N/A	770	0.3	N/A
Natural Law		0	N/A	746	0.3	N/A

=== South of Scotland ===
1999 Scottish Parliament election: South of Scotland
Constituency	Elected member	Result
Ayr	Ian Welsh	Scottish Labour win (new seat)
Carrick, Cumnock and Doon Valley	Cathy Jamieson	Scottish Labour win (new seat)
Clydesdale	Karen Turnbull	Scottish Labour win (new seat)
Cunninghame South	Irene Oldfather	Scottish Labour win (new seat)
Dumfries	Elaine Murray	Scottish Labour win (new seat)
East Lothian	John Home Robertson	Scottish Labour win (new seat)
Galloway and Upper Nithsdale	Alasdair Morgan	Scottish National Party win (new seat)
Roxburgh and Berwickshire	Euan Robson	Scottish Liberal Democrats win (new seat)
Tweeddale, Ettrick and Lauderdale	Ian Jenkins	Scottish Liberal Democrats win (new seat)

1999 Scottish Parliament election: South of Scotland
Party	Elected candidates	Seats	+/−	Votes	%	+/−%
Labour		0	N/A	98,836	31.0	N/A
SNP	Michael Russell; Adam Ingram; Christine Creech	3	N/A	80,059	25.1	N/A
Conservative	Phil Gallie; Alex Fergusson; Murray Tosh; David Mundell	4	N/A	68,904	21.6	N/A
Liberal Democrats		0	N/A	38,157	12.0	N/A
Socialist Labour		0	N/A	13,887	4.4	N/A
Green		0	N/A	9,467	3.0	N/A
Liberal		0	N/A	3,478	1.1	N/A
Scottish Socialist		0	N/A	3,304	1.0	N/A
UKIP		0	N/A	1,502	0.5	N/A
Natural Law		0	N/A	755	0.2	N/A

=== West of Scotland ===
1999 Scottish Parliament election: West of Scotland
Constituency	Elected member	Result
Clydebank and Milngavie	Des McNulty	Scottish Labour win (new seat)
Cunninghame North	Allan Wilson	Scottish Labour win (new seat)
Dumbarton	Jackie Baillie	Scottish Labour win (new seat)
Eastwood	Kenneth Macintosh	Scottish Labour win (new seat)
Greenock and Inverclyde	Duncan McNeil	Scottish Labour win (new seat)
Paisley North	Wendy Alexander	Scottish Labour win (new seat)
Paisley South	Hugh Henry	Scottish Labour win (new seat)
Strathkelvin and Bearsden	Sam Galbraith	Scottish Labour win (new seat)
West Renfrewshire	Patricia Godman	Scottish Labour win (new seat)

1999 Scottish Parliament election: West of Scotland
Party	Elected candidates	Seats	+/−	Votes	%	+/−%
Labour		0	N/A	119,663	38.5	N/A
SNP	Colin Campbell; Kay Ullrich; Lloyd Quinan; Fiona McLeod	4	N/A	80,417	25.9	N/A
Conservative	Annabel Goldie; John Young	2	N/A	48,666	15.7	N/A
Liberal Democrats	Ross Finnie	1	N/A	34,095	11.0	N/A
Green		0	N/A	8,174	2.6	N/A
Scottish Socialist		0	N/A	5,944	1.9	N/A
Socialist Labour		0	N/A	4,472	1.4	N/A
ProLife Alliance		0	N/A	3,227	1.0	N/A
Independent		0	N/A	2,761	0.9	N/A
Scottish Unionist Party (modern)		0	N/A	1,840	0.6	N/A
Natural Law		0	N/A	589	0.2	N/A
Independent		0	N/A	565	0.2	N/A

=== Party representation ===
- Labour – 56 Members of the Scottish Parliament (MSPs)
- SNP – 35 MSPs
- Conservative – 18 MSPs
- Liberal Democrats – 17 MSPs
- Green – 1 MSP
- SSP – 1 MSP
- Others (Dennis Canavan, Falkirk West) – 1 MSP

== Party leaders in 1999 ==
- Labour – Donald Dewar
- SNP – Alex Salmond
- Conservative – David McLetchie
- Liberal Democrat – Jim Wallace
- SSP – Tommy Sheridan
- Green – Robin Harper

== See also ==
- Executive of the 1st Scottish Parliament
- Members elected to the 1st Scottish Parliament
