= Richard Leonard =

Former Leader of the Scottish Labour Party

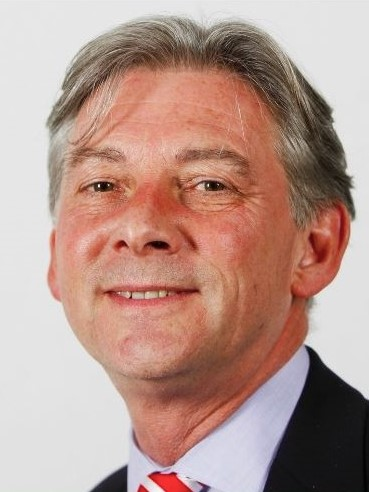
- Official portrait, 2016

Leader of the Scottish Labour Party
- In office 18 November 2017 – 14 January 2021
- Deputy: Alex Rowley; Lesley Laird; Jackie Baillie
- UK party leader: Jeremy Corbyn; Keir Starmer
- Preceded by: Kezia Dugdale (Note: Alex Rowley acted from 29 August 2017 to 15 November 2017 followed by Jackie Baillie from 15 to 18 November 2017)
- Succeeded by: Anas Sarwar (Note: Jackie Baillie acted from 14 January 2021 to 27 February 2021)

Convener of the Public Audit Committee
- In office 23 June 2021 – 8 April 2026
- Preceded by: Jenny Marra
- Succeeded by: Neil Bibby

Member of the Scottish Parliament for Central Scotland (1 of 7 Regional MSPs)
- In office 5 May 2016 – 9 April 2026

Scottish Labour portfolios
- 2016–2017: Shadow Minister for Economy
- 2018–2021: Shadow Cabinet Secretary for Economy, Jobs and Fair Work

Personal details
- Born: January 1962 (age 64) Westow, East Riding of Yorkshire, England
- Party: Scottish Labour
- Spouse: Karen Leonard
- Children: 1 son, 1 stepdaughter
- Education: Pocklington School
- Alma mater: University of Stirling
- Website: Official website

Richard Leonard (born January 1962) is a British politician who served as Leader of the Scottish Labour Party from 2017 to 2021. He served as a Member of the Scottish Parliament (MSP), as one of the additional members for the Central Scotland region, from 2016 to 2026. He ideologically identifies as a socialist, democrat and internationalist.

Born and raised in Yorkshire, Leonard won a scholarship to be educated at Pocklington School. He moved to Scotland in the 1980s to study Politics and Economics at the University of Stirling. Following his graduation, he worked as an aide to Labour politician Alex Falconer before working as a trade unionist for the Scottish Trades Union Congress and GMB Scotland. From 2002 to 2003, he served as Chair of the Scottish Labour Party when he was active in opposing the Iraq War. After unsuccessfully contesting Carrick, Cumnock and Doon Valley in 2011, he was elected at the 2016 Scottish Parliament election on the Central Scotland regional list.

Leonard defeated Anas Sarwar to win the 2017 Scottish Labour leadership election, succeeding Kezia Dugdale, and he later took on the role of Shadow Cabinet Secretary for Economy, Jobs and Fair Work. After replacing Jackie Baillie in a 2018 frontbench reshuffle, Baillie was elected as his new deputy leader in 2020. A supporter of Jeremy Corbyn, Leonard was credited for shifting Scottish Labour leftwards but criticised for poor results at the 2019 European Parliament election and 2019 general election. He faced a motion of no confidence in his leadership in 2020 but the motion failed to gain enough support. He remained as leader until standing down in January 2021 prior to the 2021 Scottish Parliament election.

== Early life and career ==
Leonard was born in January 1962 in Westow, East Riding of Yorkshire and raised in the market town of Malton, North Yorkshire. He is the son of Derek, a tailor and member of the Tailor and Garment Workers Union, and Janet, who looked after him and his two sisters. From the age of 11, he was educated at the independent, fee-paying Pocklington School in the East Riding of Yorkshire, having received a local education authority scholarship. As a young boy, his first job was picking potatoes in Autumn. He was inspired politically in his youth by Arguments for Socialism written by Tony Benn, a leftist Labour Member of Parliament and former cabinet minister. He was further influenced by Farewell to the Working Class and Critique of Economic Reason by Austrian philosopher André Gorz, as well as the works of early socialist novelist William Morris.

Leonard studied Politics and Economics at the University of Stirling, where he was a member of the Labour club and president of the Students' Association. He was a contemporary of future First Minister of Scotland Jack McConnell and they shared a flat together for a time following graduation. While a student, he had a summer job weeding wheat fields in Suffolk, East Anglia, after his family moved south to help his father find work. After university, he went on to spend five years working as an aide to Alex Falconer, Member of the European Parliament for Mid Scotland and Fife. He then spent a further five years as head of economics and assistant secretary for the Scottish Trades Union Congress. He then worked for 20 years as a GMB Scotland industrial organiser, a role in which he represented women, apprentices and young people on low pay.

== Early political career ==
Throughout Leonard's working life, he was active in the Scottish Labour Party, including serving as election agent for Anne McGuire in Stirling at the 1997 general election where they unseated Secretary of State for Scotland Michael Forsyth by 6,411 votes. Leonard served as Chair of the Scottish Labour Party from 2002 to 2003 but opposed the 2003 invasion of Iraq, marching against the war and describing the bombing of Baghdad as "awful".

Leonard stood as the Labour candidate for Carrick, Cumnock and Doon Valley at the 2011 Scottish Parliament election but lost to the Scottish National Party's Adam Ingram. At the 2016 Scottish Parliament election, he contested Airdrie and Shotts. The SNP's Alex Neil held the seat but Leonard was elected as a Member of the Scottish Parliament as one of seven additional members for the Central Scotland region. Shortly after his election as an MSP, he was given a junior role on the Scottish Labour frontbench as Shadow Economy Minister by leader Kezia Dugdale. He supported Jeremy Corbyn in the 2016 UK Labour Party leadership election.

== Leader of the Scottish Labour Party ==
=== 2017 Scottish Labour Party leadership election ===
The 2017 Scottish Labour Party leadership election was triggered by the sudden resignation of Kezia Dugdale in August. During the campaign to decide her successor, BBC News described Leonard as more left-wing than his rival, Anas Sarwar. Leonard received celebrity endorsement from cult comic book scribe Mark Millar, known for Kick-Ass and Kingsman, who said he was "the most exciting thing to happen up here in decades". On 18 November 2017, it was announced he had been elected as Leader of the Scottish Labour Party, receiving 56.7% of the vote on a 62.3% turnout.

Only a few hours after the leadership election result was declared, Kezia Dugdale announced she was set to join reality TV game show I'm a Celebrity...Get Me Out of Here!. This would mean she would be in Australia for several weeks while the Scottish Parliament was still in session. Leonard said he would discuss with Labour MSPs whether she would be suspended for failing to notify the party. It was decided she would not be suspended but, instead, sent a written warning from Scottish Labour Parliamentary Business Manager James Kelly. When she returned from Australia, she met with Leonard and other colleagues and released a statement expressing regret at her announcement overshadowing Leonard's victory. She also donated the earnings from her MSP's salary while absent, as well as part of the money earned from the show, to charity.

=== Early leadership: 2017–2019 ===
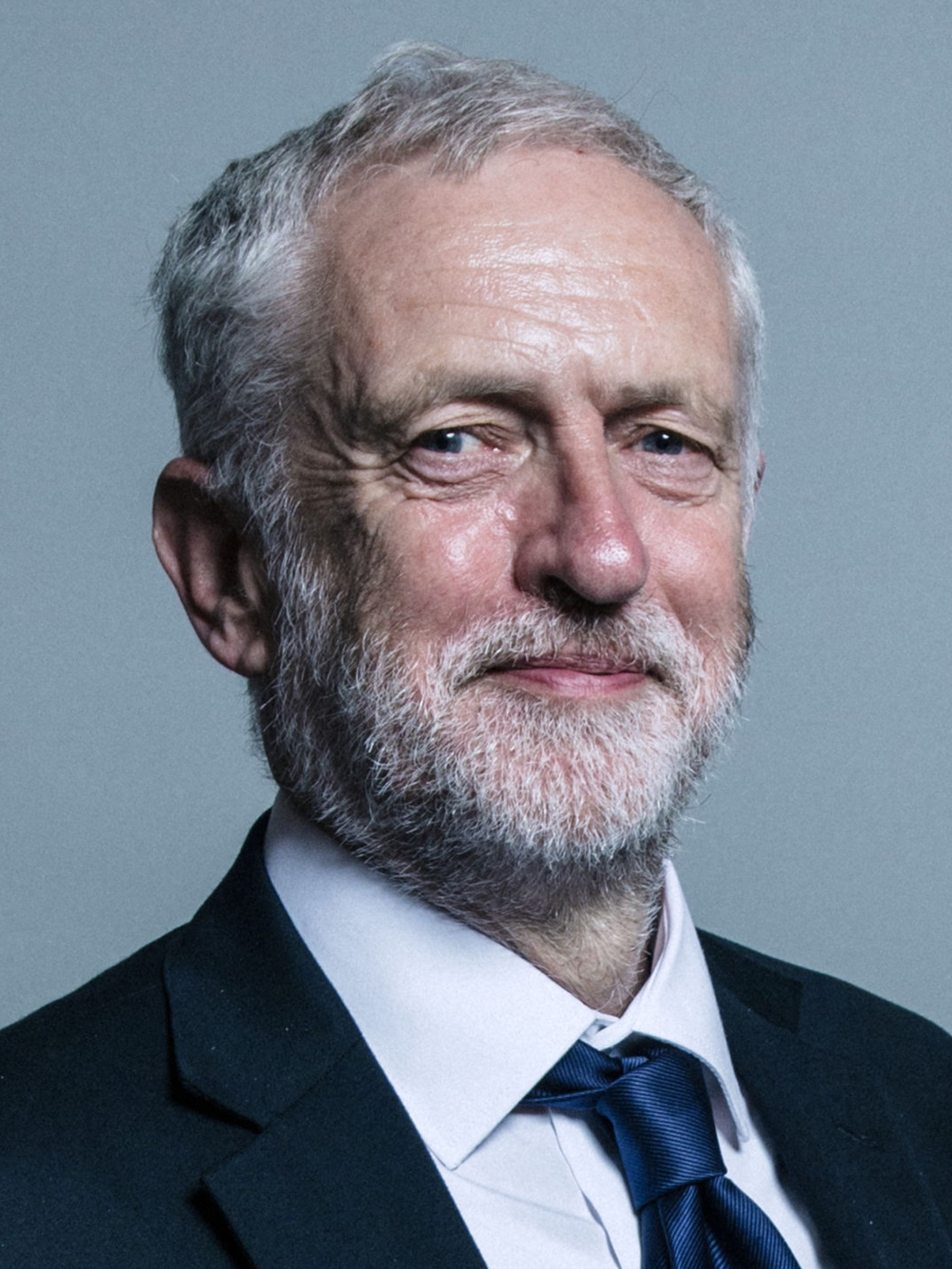
Leonard was an ally of Labour leader Jeremy Corbyn

In December 2017, Leonard announced his new Shadow Cabinet. Jackie Baillie, Scottish Labour's longest-serving constituency MSP, was appointed as Shadow Cabinet Secretary for Economy, Jobs and Fair Work. Leonard's former leadership rival Anas Sarwar was kept as Shadow Health and Sport Secretary. Neil Findlay, a close ally of both Leonard and Jeremy Corbyn, was made Shadow Brexit and Constitutional Relations Secretary. The announcement of Elaine Smith as a shadow equality minister was controversial. A practising Roman Catholic, she had a record of opposing same-sex marriage, likening it to polygamy in 2013. Leonard said he disagreed with her position on same-sex marriage but felt her criticisms of wealth disparity justified her appointment.

Leonard somewhat distanced himself from Jeremy Corbyn in 2017, saying "I'm too long in the tooth to be a Corbynista". However, in his 2018 Labour Party Conference speech, he "confessed" to voting for Corbyn to be leader both in 2015 and 2016 because he believed Scotland would need a radical Corbyn government. Under his leadership, Scottish Labour would also go on to adopt the "For the Many, Not the Few" branding of the UK Labour Party.

President of the United States Donald Trump, whose mother was Scottish, travelled to Scotland during his July 2018 UK state visit. Leonard attended protests in Glasgow and outside the Scottish Parliament opposing the visit because of Trump's attitudes and actions towards women, ethnic minorities and the poor. Trump returned to Scotland while on a June 2019 royal visit and Leonard spoke at a protest rally outside St Giles' Cathedral in Edinburgh.

In September 2018, Scottish Labour cut funding for Kezia Dugdale's defence in a defamation case by video games journalist and nationalist blogger Stuart Campbell. They had previously promised not to do so and there was controversy over whether the decision was encouraged by the UK party. Dugdale subsequently won the case on the grounds of principle of fair comment. In leaked messages, Edinburgh South MP Ian Murray wrote, "Ultimately she won her case and the party lost £80,000 as they would've got their costs had they kept their promise." He also wrote the decision was the "final straw" which caused her to leave Holyrood in 2019 and he angrily derided the Scottish Labour leadership as "full of thugs and incompetents".

Leonard carried out a frontbench reshuffle in October 2018, following a series of negative briefings by MSPs close to Kezia Dugdale. He took on the role of Shadow Economy Secretary, dismissing Jackie Baillie. Anas Sarwar was replaced by Monica Lennon, who was succeeded as Shadow Communities and Local Government Secretary by Alex Rowley. Both Lennon and Rowley had been allies of Leonard, and ally Neil Findlay was given the added role of Parliamentary Business Manager. Critics of Leonard briefed the reshuffle was a purge of moderate MSPs. They also criticised how Baillie and Sarwar found out about their dismissals; Baillie by phone five minutes before it was publicly announced and Sarwar over Twitter while attending a Holyrood chamber debate. Leonard said the reshuffle was necessary to refresh his frontbench and ensure unity among its members. Former government minister Hugh Henry defended Leonard, arguing Baillie and Sarwar had both been disloyal.

Following the resignation of Kezia Dugdale from the Scottish Parliament in 2019, former MSP and Transport Minister Sarah Boyack took her place on the Lothian regional list. In the September, Leonard appointed her Shadow Local Government Secretary. He moved Alex Rowley to cover Brexit and constitutional relations and moved Shadow Finance Secretary James Kelly to cover justice. He also brought on North Ayrshire Council leader Joe Cullinane as head of campaigns and party engagement. Leonard said the additions would strengthen his core team but admitted Scottish Labour would still "need to make a strong case" to win back voters.

In April 2019, Anas Sarwar's case against Rutherglen councillor Davie McLachlan, who allegedly said "Scotland wouldn't vote for a brown Muslim Paki", was dropped by the National Constitutional Committee on a technicality. In public support of Sarwar, Leonard said, "We have doubled the size of the National Constitutional Committee which hears these cases but, as this case shows, clearly more still needs to be done".

At the 2019 Edinburgh Fringe, Shadow Chancellor of the Exchequer John McDonnell insisted a Labour government would not block the holding of a second Scottish independence referendum if the Scottish Parliament voted for one. These remarks met with opposition from Leonard and other Scottish Labour colleagues. This caused Jeremy Corbyn to issue a statement that a Scottish Parliament vote could not be the only requirement for a new mandate, other requirements had yet to be met and, if they were met, a referendum would still not be priority for an incoming government. Both Leonard and McDonnell accepted Corbyn's decision on the matter, which was a compromise between their two positions.

=== 2019 European Parliament election and aftermath: April–September 2019 ===
Leonard led Scottish Labour into the 2019 European Parliament election with the party inheriting, from 2014, two of the six seats in Scotland. David Martin, an MEP since 1984, was first on the party list and former MSP Jayne Baxter succeeded Catherine Stihler as second. The campaign was managed by Neil Findlay. Scottish Labour vowed to pursue a "soft Brexit", consistent with the UK party. This was heavily challenged by the overtly pro-Remain SNP, as well as an insurgent Brexit Party. Brexit compounded an issue already facing Scottish Labour in the wake of the 2014 Scottish independence referendum; its loss of nationalist support to the SNP and unionist support to the Scottish Conservatives.

In leaked WhatsApp messages, the "soft Brexit" position taken by Leonard's campaign was criticised by Shadow Minister for Scotland Paul Sweeney, who wrote, "If it's like this then it's a bad misjudgement and I'm having nothing to do with it... Let's hope the NEC [National Executive Committee] kill this bullshit line." Rutherglen and Hamilton West MP Ged Killen wrote that the stance had given the SNP "a new lease of life" and East Lothian MP Martin Whitfield added that Labour was at risk of being "dead in Scotland". Only Jeremy Corbyn's face was placed on the cover of the Scottish Labour campaign leaflet, which Leonard later admitted was a mistake and a missed opportunity to promote himself as more than Corbyn's "man in Scotland".

The result for Scotland was declared on 27 May 2019. Scottish Labour lost both its seats, receiving 9.3% of the vote and coming fifth behind the SNP, Brexit Party, Scottish Liberal Democrats and Scottish Conservatives respectively. In the aftermath, Leonard accepted responsibility and said he would endorse remaining in the European Union, defying the UK party. Findlay resigned from his frontbench portfolios and promised to resign as an MSP at the 2021 Scottish Parliament election. Shadow Justice Secretary Daniel Johnson also resigned, citing the election result and a lack of clarity on Brexit from Leonard.

In September, Leonard moved Alex Rowley to cover Brexit and constitutional relations and moved Shadow Finance Secretary James Kelly to replace Daniel Johnson as Shadow Justice Secretary. He also brought on North Ayrshire Council leader Joe Cullinane as head of campaigns and party engagement. Following Kezia Dugdale's resignation from the Scottish Parliament, former MSP and Transport Minister Sarah Boyack took Dugdale's place on the Lothian regional list and Leonard appointed her as Shadow Local Government Secretary. Leonard said the additions would strengthen his core team but admitted Scottish Labour would still "need to make a strong case" to win back voters.

=== 2019 general election: November–December 2019 ===
During the 2019 general election, Leonard led the Labour campaign in Scotland. Campaign for Socialism member Lesley Brennan served as his chief of staff, former Morning Star editor Conrad Landin as director of communications and Joe Cullinane as head of campaigns and party engagement. The core campaign pledge made by Leonard and Jeremy Corbyn was to invest an extra £70 billion in Scottish public services. On a two-day trip to Scotland, Jeremy Corbyn was heckled in Glasgow on the first day and Dundee on the second day. In Glasgow, by a church minister over Corbyn's connections to Islamist terrorists. In Dundee, by a Scottish nationalist. The Church of Scotland later suspended the minister for historic Islamophobic and homophobic social media posts.

Scottish Labour saw itself lose the six seats it had gained in the 2017 general election, under Kezia Dugdale. Once again, the party was reduced to holding a single seat. Leonard apologised for the UK party failing to address concerns over Brexit and for the Scottish party not having stopped what he described as the "SNP juggernaut". However, he said he would continue as leader and carry out a listening exercise.

=== Election of Jackie Baillie as deputy leader and resignation: 2020–2021 ===
I think we need to see some new blood in here. One of the things the last few days have taught me is we need to see an injection of new voices, a more diverse profile of people.

— Leonard on his internal Scottish Parliament critics

When Leonard's deputy Lesley Laird lost her seat at the 2019 general election, she resigned from the deputy leadership shortly afterwards. Jackie Baillie then stood in the deputy leadership election to replace Laird and was elected in April 2020, having been critical of the strategy which resulted in the poor general election result.

After Baillie won the deputy leadership, Scottish Labour peer George Foulkes called on Leonard to resign and be replaced by Baillie. Foulkes was joined by James Kelly, Daniel Johnson, Jenny Marra, Mark Griffin and Rachel Reeves. Leonard accused his critics of never supporting his leadership and mounting "an internal war". He also suggested MSPs could face deselection for showing disloyalty, said attempts to oust him as leader were an "act of sabotage" and confirmed he would fight any challenger for the leadership. In an interview with Sky News, Leonard continued to emphasise his mandate from Scottish Labour members and that there had been five Scottish Labour leaders in the previous six years. Kelly and other rebels put forward a motion of no confidence in Leonard's leadership. However, the motion was withdrawn after failing to gain enough support. Leonard later replaced Kelly as Shadow Justice Secretary with Rhoda Grant.

On 14 January 2021, Leonard resigned as Scottish Labour leader with immediate effect. In a statement, he said deciding to step aside prior to the 2021 Scottish Parliament election was "not an easy decision" but the "right one for me and for the party". His Westminster counterpart, Keir Starmer insisted he was "very proud" of Leonard's achievements and said, "I would like to thank Richard for his service to our party and his unwavering commitment to the values he believes in". However, according to The National, potential Labour donors allegedly told Starmer during a Zoom meeting that they would not donate to the Westminster party unless Leonard resigned.

== Later political career ==
Leonard stood as the Scottish Labour candidate in Airdrie and Shotts at the 2021 Scottish Parliament election, taking 10,671 votes (33.4%), finishing second to the SNP's Neil Gray. Leonard was again returned on the Central Scotland regional list.

On 4 March 2025, he announced he would stand down at the 2026 Scottish Parliament election.

== Political positions and views ==
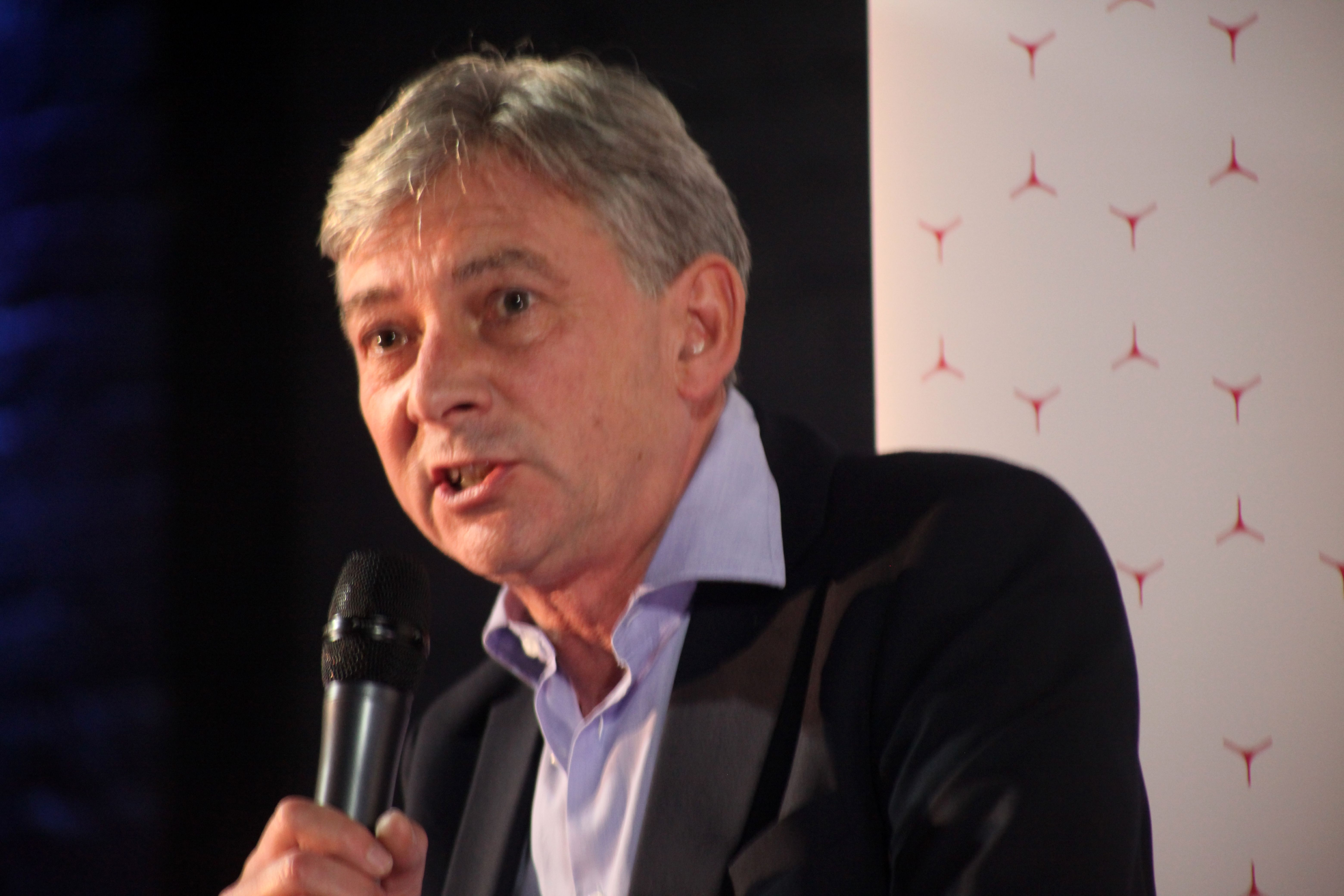
Leonard speaking at the 2018 Labour Party Conference's The World Transformed fringe event

During the 2019 general election campaign, Leonard described himself as a "socialist, democrat and internationalist". He has been described by journalists as being left-wing, on the hard left and hostile to business. His politics have been described by allies as radical, conviction-led and based around representing and helping people. An ally of Jeremy Corbyn, his closeness to Corbyn was criticised as costing Scottish Labour in the polls. He is a long-standing member of the Campaign for Nuclear Disarmament (CND), which opposes the replacement of Trident with a new nuclear weapons system. However, he has stated he would defer to the position of the UK Labour Party, as defence is a non-devolved matter.

Leonard has said he wants to fundamentally change the Scottish economy and has advocated a shift to a more planned, long-term approach to economic management. He is described in Tom Bower's biography Dangerous Hero as "a Marxist". When questioned over this assertion in an interview with Novara Media's Ash Sarkar, Leonard said, despite having read Marx, he would not describe his politics as Marxist but rather a synthesis of "Scottish radicalism" and those of "post-industrial Utopians".

Leonard has stated leaving the United Kingdom would create larger problems for Scotland than the UK leaving the European Union. He is an opponent of a second Scottish independence referendum and has argued the 2014 referendum, in which Scotland voted to stay by 55% to 45%, was a once in a generation event. While the United Kingdom as a whole voted to leave the European Union by 52% to 48% in the 2016 EU referendum, Scotland itself voted to remain by 62% to 38%. Despite this, Leonard was initially in favour of the UK Labour Party's position of pursuing a "soft Brexit". In the aftermath of his party's poor result in the 2019 European Parliament election, he subsequently agreed to shift his pursuit to the UK remaining in the EU.

A former trade unionist, Leonard argues the Scottish Government must recognise trade unions and pay a real living wage on all its public contracts. He has said he would support Scotland's red meat industry by investing more in abattoirs and rural supply chains, and would aim for full employment in the Highlands and Islands. He has also discussed seeing working time as a unit of currency and aiming for a managed reduction in the length of work weeks. He has stated Scottish Labour has "unfinished business" with land reform and should replace council tax with a property and land tax to force tax burden onto those with more wealth and more land. He advocates nationalising Scottish railways, removing Scotrail from private ownership by Abellio, and bus services, with the wider aim of making bus travel free for all.

On 24 September 2024 Leonard attended an emergency demonstration, called by Glasgow Stop the War Coalition, relating to what the organisers described as a "...genocide in Gaza...[by]...Israel...extended to Lebanon". Posting photographs of the demonstration – including the hashtag #ceasefirenow – writing on social media site 'X', Leonard called for "Hands off Lebanon. End the siege of Gaza".

== Notes ==
Political offices
Preceded by Jenny Marra	Convener of the Public Audit Committee; 2021–present	Incumbent
Party political offices
Preceded by Jackie Baillie	Scottish Labour Spokesperson for Economy, Jobs and Fair Work; 2018–2021	Succeeded by Monica Lennon
Preceded by Kezia Dugdale	Leader of the Scottish Labour Party; 2017–2021	Succeeded by Anas Sarwar
