= Deputy Leader of the Scottish Labour Party =

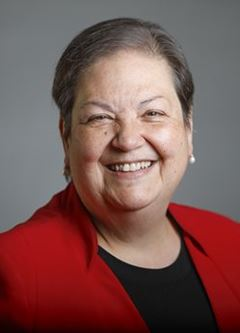
- Incumbent; Jackie Baillie since 3 April 2020
- Member of: Scottish Parliament (since 2000); Parliament of the United Kingdom (since 2011); Local government in Scotland (since 2011)
- Inaugural holder: Cathy Jamieson
- Formation: 21 October 2000

The office of Deputy Leader of the Scottish Labour Party was established in 2000 under the leadership of Donald Dewar. Since the Murphy and Boyack review in 2011, the office has open up to all elected Scottish Labour politicians, including members of the Scottish Parliament, the Parliament of the United Kingdom and local government in Scotland. During leadership elections, the incumbent deputy leader becomes acting Leader of the Scottish Labour Party.

== List ==
No.	Image	Name	Term start	Term end	Source
1		Cathy Jamieson	21 October 2000	28 June 2008	
2		Johann Lamont	13 September 2008	17 December 2011	
3		Anas Sarwar	17 December 2011	13 December 2014	
4		Kezia Dugdale	13 December 2014	13 June 2015	
5		Alex Rowley	15 August 2015	16 December 2017	
Lesley Laird was interim deputy leader during this period
6		Lesley Laird	4 June 2018	16 December 2019	
7		Jackie Baillie	3 April 2020	Incumbent	
