= 2017 Scottish Labour leadership election =

Scottish internal political party contest

2017 Scottish Labour Party leadership election
- 27 October – 18 November 2017
- Turnout: 21,994 (62.3%)
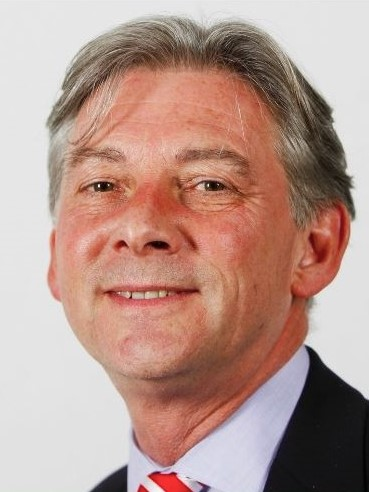

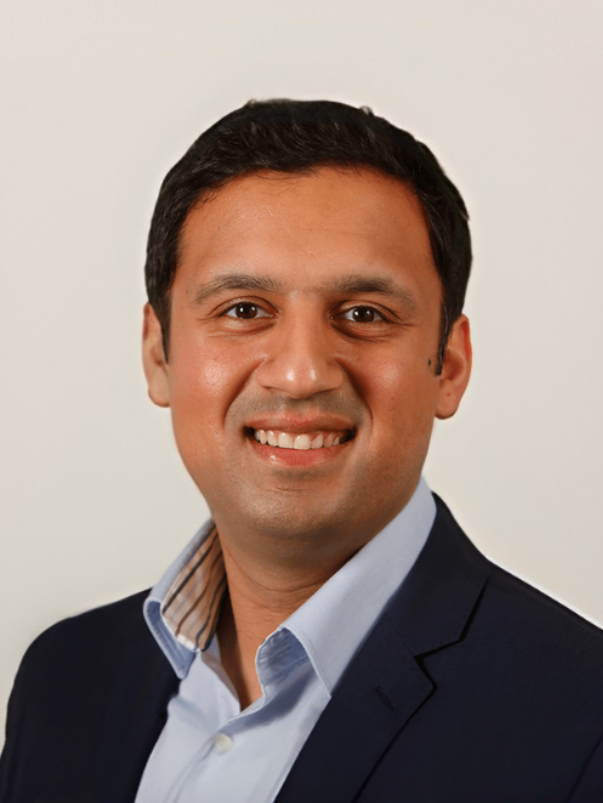
Candidate	Richard Leonard	Anas Sarwar
First preferences	12,469	9,516
Percentage	56.7%	43.3%
Leader before election
Jackie Baillie (Acting)
Previously Kezia Dugdale
and Alex Rowley (Acting)
Elected Leader
Richard Leonard

The 2017 Scottish Labour Party leadership election was triggered on 29 August 2017 by the resignation of Kezia Dugdale as leader of the Scottish Labour Party, having led the party for two years. MSP Jackie Baillie was acting interim leader for the last week of the election after Alex Rowley, the original interim leader, was suspended from the party over allegations of a criminal nature.

Richard Leonard was elected as leader on 18 November 2017, defeating Anas Sarwar.

== Background ==
Kezia Dugdale announced her resignation from the Scottish Labour Party leadership on 29 August 2017, saying that she was leaving the party in a better state than she had found it, but that the best thing for the party would be to "pass the baton on".

Under her leadership, Scottish Labour finished in third place at the 2016 Holyrood election, losing thirteen seats; their worst performance since devolution began in 1999 and were overtaken as the largest opposition party by the Scottish Conservatives.

The party also finished in third place at the 2017 local elections, losing 133 councillors.

Scottish Labour finished in third place at the 2017 snap general election, though it gained seven seats, an increase of six seats from the 2015 general election, before her leadership began and while she was deputy leader. This was the first time Labour had finished in third place at a general election in Scotland since 1918.

== Procedure ==
As with the previous leadership election, the election was held under one-person-one-vote from an electorate of members, affiliated supporters and registered supporters.

Leadership candidates needed to be an MP, MSP or MEP, and need the support of at least 15%, or five, of the thirty-two Scottish Labour MPs, MSPs and MEPs.

During the 'supporting nominations' period, local Labour Party groups (CLPs) across the country were offered the opportunity to hold a symbolic ballot in which their membership could vote for their preferred candidate, so that the winner would be officially endorsed by that CLP. Of the 73 Scottish Parliament constituencies there will only be up to 70 supporting nominations submitted, as three pairs of corresponding CLPs, typically pairs of geographical neighbours, were involved in an arrangement whereby the two CLPs will submit any nomination vote they may decide to cast together as one. On this occasion, the three joint CLPs are Dundee City Labour Party (formed of Dundee East and Dundee West), Perth and Kinross Labour Party (formed of Perthshire North and Perthshire South and Kinross-shire), and Dumfries and Galloway Labour Party (formed of Dumfriesshire and Galloway and West Dumfries).

=== Timetable ===
11 September	Nominations open
16 September	Hustings for Scottish Labour parliamentarians
17 September	Nominations closed
18 September	Supporting nominations open; hustings begin
9 October	Latest date to join in order to vote
13 October	Supporting nominations close
27 October	Voting opens; hustings end
17 November	Voting closes at midday
18 November	Result announced

== Campaign ==
In early September 2017, Richard Leonard and Anas Sarwar announced that they would be running for the leadership. Leonard appointed Danielle Rowley as his campaign chair, whilst Sarwar appointed Pauline McNeill and Martin Whitfield as his campaign co-chairs. They both wrote for the Sunday Mail to pay tribute to outgoing leader Kezia Dugdale and Jeremy Corbyn, praise the party's platform, and decry nationalism. Sarwar was described as a centrist and on the party's centre-left, and describes himself as a Brownite. Leonard is more associated with the left-wing of the party, and emphasised the consistency in his positions and his support for Labour leader Corbyn.

Supporters of Leonard criticised Sarwar as a ″careerist″ for changing his mind about Corbyn, with Sarwar having called for him to consider his position in a letter ahead of the national party's 2016 leadership election. When asked, Leonard did not have a ready answer as to whether he'd changed his view on anything in the last thirty or forty years.

Candidates were required to receive at least five supporting nominations from Scottish Labour parliamentarians across Westminster, Holyrood and the European Parliament. Both easily reached this, with Leonard receiving nine and Sarwar receiving fifteen. Whilst Sarwar received more nominations from Labour MSPs, Leonard received the backing of the majority of Scottish Labour MPs, as well as supporting nominations from six affiliated trade unions by 29 September.

The candidates praised each other's work, and both sought to introduce "progressive taxation" at Holyrood to fund the NHS and education, describing themselves as ″proud socialists″. Sarwar presented himself as a unity candidate, but Leonard accused him of disunity for his prior opposition to Corbyn's leadership.

On policy, Sarwar declared his support for public ownership of railways and tougher laws on employment rights. Leonard pledged tough rent controls and the introduction of workers' right-to-buy, alongside consideration of broader public ownership. Both candidates made clear their ambitions to become Scotland's next First Minister. Following criticism for both candidates and deputy Alex Rowley being men, both candidates made campaign promises relating to women's rights and representation. Leonard pledged to set up a training academy to make Labour's candidates ″as diverse as the electorate″ by supporting female, LGBT, BME and disabled members towards candidacy. Sarwar pledged to create a second deputy leader post to ensure greater gender balance and to ensure at least half of Labour's Holyrood frontbench are women, alongside a commission to tackle the gender pay gap.

Sarwar proposed a tax plan, including raising income tax on high earners further than the party's previous position and reducing income on low earners from 20% to 15%, to raise a further £700 million in tax revenue. He argued that this money could fund a reversal of disability benefit cuts, means-tested child tax credits of £10 a week and public sector pay increases. Leonard subsequently released tax proposals to introduce two new income tax bands for people earning more than £70,000 and £100,000, as well as a 1% windfall tax on Scotland's wealthiest individuals to raise £3.7 billion. The Scottish government confirmed that this windfall tax would not be possible without further powers being given to the Scottish government by the UK government.

Leonard also proposed strengthening the powers of local government, a "massive" housebuilding scheme, higher child benefits and a new national energy company. Sarwar proposed a guaranteed job, training place or place in further education for every school leaver as well as support for the UK to remain a permanent member of the EU single market.

On 24 September, the Huffington Post reported that Unite had signed up 2,700 Unite members to the political levy, allowing them to vote in the leadership contest. This was in addition to 5,000 existing levy-payers. The Huffington Post reported that as a result, Unite members could end up comprising a third of the entire electorate.

After supporting nominations closed on 13 October, it was reported that forty-three Constituency Labour Parties had nominated Leonard (covering forty-five actual constituencies due to two nominations from joint CLPs), sixteen had nominated Sarwar (covering seventeen actual constituencies due to one joint CLP nomination) and eleven had made no supporting nomination. One report estimated that the vote totals in these nomination meetings, in which only full members could vote, came to 58.5% for Leonard and 41.5% for Sarwar.

Much of the early campaign focused on Sarwar's background. Both candidates had attended private schools in their youth, and Sarwar sent his own children to a private school. When asked, Sarwar said that he did so because too many schools ″simply aren't good enough″, but that he was in the Labour Party to change inequality. Sarwar faced criticism from Leonard's supporters and the Scottish National Party for his stake in his family business, with some describing him as ″one of the few″ in Labour's 2017 general election slogan ″for the many, not the few″. Sarwar's family's firm does not recognise trade unions or pay wages at the level advocated by the Labour Party. Sarwar emphasised that he was a minority shareholder who has no role in running the company, though he admitted receiving hundreds of thousands of pounds in dividends from his stake, which is said to be worth £4,800,000. Following this criticism, Sarwar relinquished his shares in the firm, putting them in a trust that his children could access once they reached adulthood.

Leonard would be the first English-born leader of the Scottish Labour Party, leading his opponents to suggest that his Englishness might make it hard to connect with the people the party needs to win over.

Sarwar's campaign received legal advice regarding Unite's sign-up processes, which it described as bringing the leadership contest into "serious question". Whilst Leonard's campaign was concerned that Sarwar might make a legal challenge, Sarwar's campaign ruled this out "in the interests of party unity".

== Candidates ==
Candidate	Political roles	Nominations from MSPs, MPs and MEPs	Supporting nominations from Constituency Labour Parties	Supporting nominations from affiliated Trade Unions, Groups and Socialist Societies	Supporting nominations from Scottish Labour Party councillors	Endorsements
Richard Leonard	MSP for Central Scotland (since 2016) Shadow Economy Minister (since 2016)	9 / 32 28.1% Nominations MSPs (5): Claudia Beamish; Neil Findlay; Rhoda Grant; Elaine Smith; Monica Lennon; Scottish MPs (4): Hugh Gaffney; Gerard Killen; Danielle Rowley; Paul Sweeney	43 / 70 61.4% Nominations: Glasgow Anniesland; Glasgow Kelvin; Glasgow Shettleston; Glasgow Cathcart; Dunfermline; Motherwell and Wishaw; Airdrie and Shotts; Hamilton, Larkhall and Stonehouse; Coatbridge and Chryston; Falkirk East; Falkirk West; Cowdenbeath; Dundee East/ Dundee West (as Dundee City LP)^{††}; Cunninghame South; Cunninghame North; Kilmarnock and Irvine Valley; Carrick, Cumnock and Doon Valley; Ettrick, Roxburgh and Berwickshire; Clydesdale; Midlothian North and Musselburgh; Midlothian South, Tweeddale and Lauderdale; Edinburgh Northern and Leith; Edinburgh Central; Edinburgh Eastern; Edinburgh Southern; Edinburgh Western; Almond Valley; Kirkcaldy; Clackmannanshire and Dunblane; Perthshire North/ Perthshire South and Kinross-shire (as Perth and Kinross LP)^{††}; North East Fife; Angus North and Mearns; Aberdeen Central; Shetland; Orkney; Inverness and Nairn; Aberdeenshire East; Stirling; Glasgow Maryhill and Springburn; Glasgow Rutherglen; Clydebank, Milngavie and Bearsden North; Strathkelvin and Bearsden; Uddingston and Bellshill	14 / 35 40.0% Nominations Groups (1): Scottish Young Labour (SYL); Trade Unions (9): Unite the Union; Unison (trade union) UNISON; Transport Salaried Staffs' Association (TSSA); Associated Society of Locomotive Engineers and Firemen (ASLEF); Union of Shop, Distributive and Allied Workers (USDAW); Bakers, Food and Allied Workers' Union (BFAWU); GMB; National Union of Mineworkers (NUM); Communication Workers Union (CWU); Socialist Societies (4): Scottish Cooperative Party; Socialist Educational Association; Socialist Health Association; Socialist Environment and Resources Association (SERA)	85 / 250 34.0%	Endorsements Unaffiliated organisations: Campaign for Socialism; Durham Miners' Association (DMA); Momentum; Public and Commercial Services Union (PCS); Scottish Labour Young Socialists; Socialist Party Scotland; Individuals: Cara Hilton; Jon Trickett; Cathy Jamieson; Eric Joyce; Drew Smith; Hugh Henry; Laura Pidcock; Mark Millar; Karen Whitefield; Lesley Brennan; Ian Davidson; Angela Rayner; Dennis Skinner; Len McCluskey; Manuel Cortes; Mark Serwotka; Owen Jones; Publications: Morning Star; New Socialist; Red Pepper; Scottish Left Review
Anas Sarwar	MSP for Glasgow (since 2016) Health Spokesperson (since 2016); Acting Leader of the Scottish Labour Party (2014); Deputy Leader of the Scottish Labour Party (2011–2014); MP for Glasgow Central (2010–2015)	15 / 32 46.9% Nominations MSPs (12): Claire Baker; Jackie Baillie; Neil Bibby; Mary Fee; Iain Gray; Mark Griffin; Daniel Johnson; James Kelly; Lewis Macdonald; Pauline McNeill; Colin Smyth; David Stewart; Scottish MPs (2): Ian Murray; Martin Whitfield; MEPs (1): Catherine Stihler	16 / 70 22.9% Nominations Constituency Labour Parties (CLPs): Eastwood; Glasgow Provan; Glasgow Southside; Cumbernauld & Kilsyth; Greenock and Inverclyde; Dumbarton; Renfrewshire South; Glasgow Pollok; Ayr; Paisley; Aberdeenshire West; Renfrewshire North and West; Dumfriesshire/ Galloway and West Dumfries (as Dumfries and Galloway LP); Na h-Eileanan an Iar; East Kilbride; East Lothian	2 / 35 5.7% Nominations Groups (1) Scottish Association of Labour Councillors Trade Unions (1): Community	95 / 250 38.0%	Endorsements Individuals: Margaret Curran; Alistair Darling; Andy Burnham; Alan Johnson

^{†} CLPs not nominating any candidate: Aberdeen South and North Kincardine; Angus South; Edinburgh Pentlands; Aberdeen Donside.

The following seven constituencies remain unaccounted for: Argyll and Bute; Banffshire and Buchan Coast; Caithness, Sutherland and Easter Ross; Linlithgow; Mid Fife and Glenrothes; Moray; Skye, Lochaber and Badenoch.

=== Declined ===
- Jackie Baillie, MSP for Dumbarton (1999 – present)
- Neil Findlay, MSP for Lothian (2011 – present)
- Daniel Johnson, MSP for Edinburgh Southern (2016 – present).
- James Kelly, MSP for Glasgow (2016 – present), MSP for Rutherglen (2011–2016), MSP for Glasgow Rutherglen (2007–2011)
- Monica Lennon, MSP for Central Scotland (2016 – present)
- Jenny Marra, MSP for North East Scotland (2011 – present)
- Pauline McNeill, MSP for Glasgow (2016 – present), MSP for Glasgow Kelvin (1999–2011)
- Alex Rowley, Deputy Leader of the Scottish Labour Party (2015 –2017) and MSP for Mid Scotland and Fife (2016 – present), MSP for Cowdenbeath (2014–2016)
- Elaine Smith, MSP for Central Scotland (2016 – present), MSP for Coatbridge and Chryston (1999–2016)

== Results ==
Candidate	Party members		Registered supporters		Affiliated supporters		Total	
Candidate	Votes	%	Votes	%	Votes	%	Votes	%
Richard Leonard ✓	9,150	51.8%	38	48.1%	3,281	77.3%	12,469	56.7%
Anas Sarwar	8,514	48.2%	41	51.9%	961	22.7%	9,516	43.3%
