= Lesley Laird =

Former Deputy Leader of the Scottish Labour Party

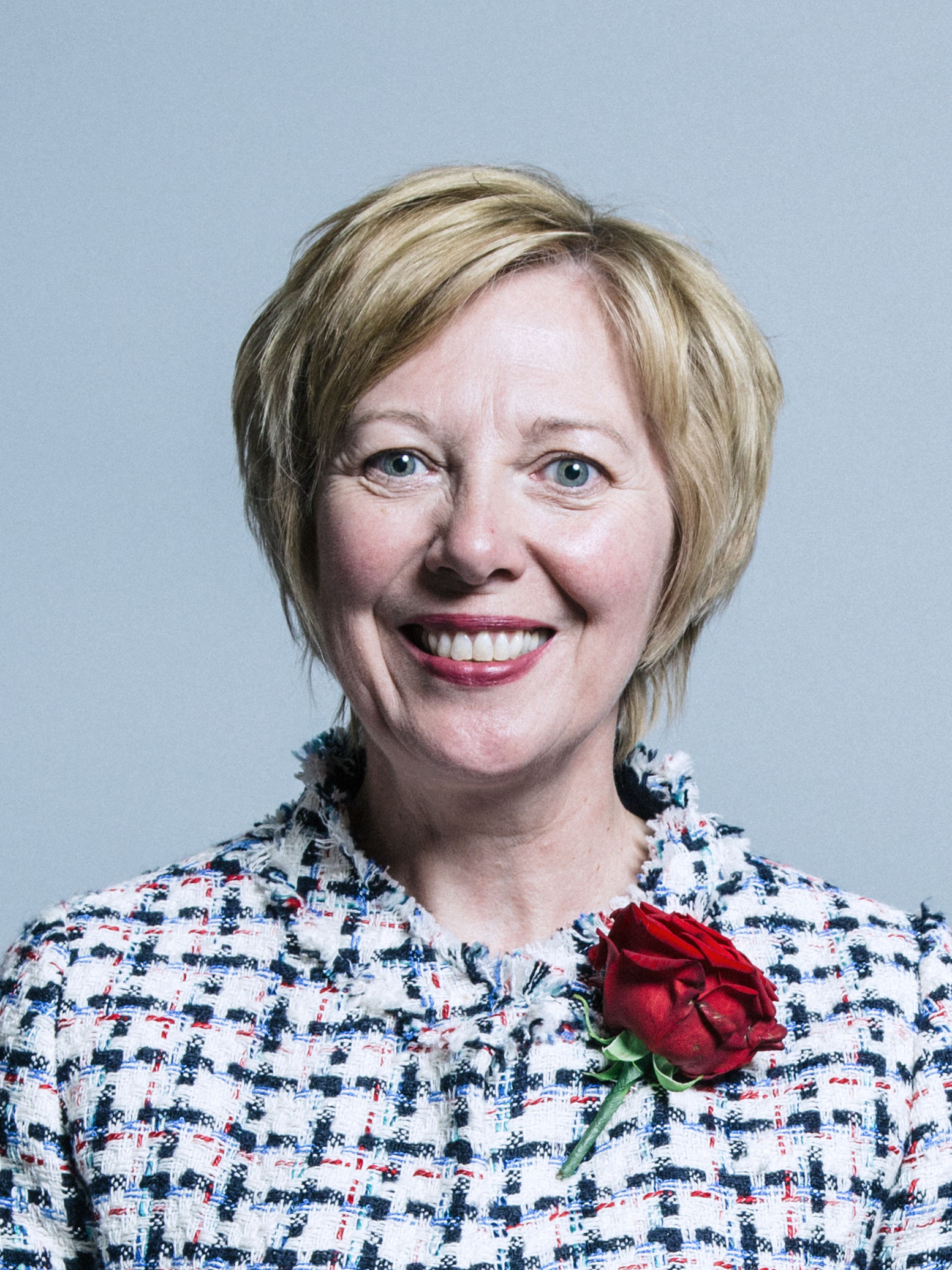
- Official portrait, 2017

Deputy Leader of the Scottish Labour Party
- In office 4 June 2018 – 16 December 2019 (Note: Acting: 16 December 2017 – 4 June 2018)
- Leader: Richard Leonard
- Preceded by: Alex Rowley
- Succeeded by: Jackie Baillie

Shadow Secretary of State for Scotland
- In office 14 June 2017 – 13 December 2019
- Leader: Jeremy Corbyn
- Preceded by: David Anderson
- Succeeded by: Tony Lloyd

Member of Parliament for Kirkcaldy and Cowdenbeath
- In office 8 June 2017 – 6 November 2019
- Preceded by: Roger Mullin
- Succeeded by: Neale Hanvey

Personal details
- Born: Lesley Margaret Langan; 15 November 1958 (age 67) Greenock, Scotland
- Party: Labour
- Education: James Watt College; Glasgow Caledonian; University; Edinburgh Napier University

Lesley Margaret Laird (née Langan; born 15 November 1958) is a Scottish politician who served as Deputy Leader of the Scottish Labour Party from 2017 to 2019. She was Member of Parliament (MP) for Kirkcaldy and Cowdenbeath from 2017 to 2019, and Shadow Secretary of State for Scotland during the same period. Laird was a Member of Fife Council from 2012 to 2018 and served as the Deputy Leader of the Council.

== Early life and career ==
Lesley Margaret Langan was born on 15 November 1958 in Greenock, Scotland. She was educated at James Watt College, Caledonian University and then Edinburgh Napier University. Prior to her election to Parliament, she was employed in senior human resources posts in the electronic, semiconductor and financial service industries.

Laird was first selected by her Constituency Labour Party to contend the 2012 local elections, and was returned alongside her Scottish Labour running mate. She was appointed spokesperson for economy and planning in February 2013 and one year later was elected by her fellow Labour councillors to the post of deputy leader.

Laird spoke on behalf of Fife Council at the Barclay Review looking at non-domestic rates across Scotland and called for reform, saying the current scheme favoured out-of-town retailers. She led the call from Fife Council for a radical overhaul of the Scottish planning system. She also secured regeneration of Fraser Avenue in Inverkeithing, a project which was commended by the Saltire Society.

Laird sought selection for the Scottish Labour regional list for the Mid Scotland and Fife region in the 2016 Scottish Parliament election.

== Parliamentary career ==
For the 2017 snap general election, Laird was selected to stand as the Scottish Labour candidate for the Kirkcaldy and Cowdenbeath constituency; once held by former Prime Minister Gordon Brown. Laird narrowly defeated the sitting MP, Roger Mullin of the SNP, by 259 votes at the 2017 general election, Laird was appointed Shadow Secretary of State for Scotland less than a week later on 14 June 2017.

Laird's maiden speech at the House of Commons focused on poverty in her constituency and quoted Kirkcaldy-born economist Adam Smith, as well as former PM Winston Churchill:

The state must increasingly and earnestly concern itself with the care of the sick, the aged and the young. The state must increasingly assume the position of the reserve employer of labour.

Laird continued to regularly campaign on poverty issues in the constituency, working in partnership with local charities in a bid to overturn the UK government's new flagship welfare policy, Universal Credit.

By enlisting support from Women Against State Pension Inequality (WASPI) campaigners, Unison and Citizens Advice Rights Fife, Laird also hosted a number of public campaign events aimed at 1950s-born women who were affected by age-related eligibility changes.

In response to public concern with ongoing flaring at Fife Ethylene Plant (FEP), Laird established a Mossmorran Working Group, the first to include cross-party elected representatives, community groups, as well as representatives from FEP operators Shell UK, ExxonMobil, the Health and Safety Executive and the Scottish Environment Protection Agency also attended.

Laird held a public meeting with ScotRail director Alex Hynes in Kirkcaldy in February 2019, to discuss franchise operator Abellio's poor performance record in Fife, particularly during that winter, when stop-skipping and train delays were a regular occurrence. Although transport issues were devolved, Laird later lobbied the Scottish Government to use an early break-clause in its Abellio contract. On 18 December 2019, transport minister Michael Matheson announced he would cancel the contract three years early, in 2022.

Laird intervened when local constituents fell victim to automated push payment (APP) fraud. Despite the Santander Bank's insistence that they were not at fault, Laird later succeeded in securing a £278,000 repayment to victims. She also campaigned against bank closures across the constituency.

The MP secured a pledge from the Ministry of Defence to finance work to clean-up radiation at Dalgety Bay – an issue blighted by two decades of inactivity.

Laird called for reform to planning law after residents objected to large-scale development in Aberdour, and campaigned for regeneration of Kirkcaldy town centre, holding talks with Columbia Threadneedle, former owners of the Postings, and LaSalle, former owners of the Mercat. She argued for government intervention for local industry to protect jobs, most notably in the case of Bifab and Babcock at Rosyth shipyard.

In May 2018, Laird faced criticism for neglecting her duties as a councillor, having only attended two meetings after her election as an MP. Critics argued she should have resigned as a councillor when becoming a Member of Parliament. Her party's rules later stated members should only hold one elected position, a policy Laird appeared to have breached, according to The National. Laird resigned the post in June 2018.

Laird lost her seat to Neale Hanvey, the SNP candidate (though he was suspended from the party at the time) at the 2019 general election. She subsequently resigned as Deputy Leader of the Scottish Labour Party, criticising members of her party for undermining the leaderships of Jeremy Corbyn and Richard Leonard.

Laird endorsed Keir Starmer in the 2020 Labour Party leadership election.

== Notes ==
Parliament of the United Kingdom
Preceded by Roger Mullin	Member of Parliament for Kirkcaldy and Cowdenbeath; 2017–2019	Succeeded by Neale Hanvey
Political offices
Preceded by David Anderson	Shadow Secretary of State for Scotland; 2017–2019	Succeeded by Tony Lloyd
Party political offices
Preceded by Alex Rowley	Deputy Leader of the Scottish Labour Party; 2017–2019	Succeeded by Jackie Baillie
