= Windermere School =

Location
- Patterdale Road; Windermere, The Lake District, LA23 1NW; England; 54.394°N 2.9136°W

Information
- Type: Private day and boarding school
- Motto: Latin: Vincit qui se vincit (He conquers who conquers himself)
- Established: 1863; 163 years ago
- Founder: Elizabeth Hall and Catherine Sharpe
- Chairman: Peter Hogan
- Headmaster: Frank Thompson
- Gender: Co-ed
- Age: 3 to 18
- Enrolment: approx. 300
- Houses: Cavendish, Flemyng, Lonsdale and Strickland (red, blue, green, yellow)
- Colours: Navy and cyan
- Alumni: Stannites
- Website: www.windermereschool.co.uk

Windermere School is an independent co-educational boarding and day school in the English Lake District. Founded in 1863, it has approximately 300 pupils between the ages of 3 and 18, around a third of whom are boarders. The School was formally split across three campuses on over fifty acres of land: the junior school at Elleray (former campus); the senior school and sixth form at Browhead; and Hodge Howe, the school's Royal Yachting Association watersports centre on the shores of Lake Windermere.

Windermere was named Sunday Times International Baccalaureate School of the Year for 2017-2018 and is a member of Round Square and the Society of Headmasters & Headmistresses of Independent Schools. The Good Schools Guide describes Windermere as 'a school which revels in a hearty approach to everything from academia to friendships'. In the latest inspection report by the Independent Schools’ Inspectorate (February 2018), Windermere School received the highest grades for the quality of the education provided; it was recognised as ‘Excellent’ for both categories: academic and other achievements, and personal development.

== History ==
The school was founded in 1863 in the Lancashire coastal town of Lytham, by schoolmistresses Elizabeth Hall and Catherine Sharpe. Its first premises were rooms in Hall's parents' house, 'The Coppice', near the Lytham seafront. The school moved into its own house on Agnes Street two years later. It was named 'The School for the Accomplished', and catered for the daughters (and a few sons) of Lancashire industrialists. Hall and Sharpe later moved it to Belgrave House on St Anne's Road West in the new town of St Annes-on-Sea, two miles up the coast. Boy pupils were phased out during this time and the ever-expanding girls' school eventually moved again to a purpose-built house at 40, North Promenade, St Annes, in 1887 as 'St Anne's High School for Girls'.

The most significant move was in 1924, when the school left Lancashire for the Browhead Estate in Windermere, Westmorland. The then vacant house had been acquired by joint headmistresses Helen Leigh and E.M. Morrison, possibly with financial assistance from Leigh's husband. The name was altered to 'St Anne's School, Windermere' and the school has remained, and expanded, at Browhead ever since. The neighbouring estate of Elleray was acquired in 1944 to house the school's preparatory and pre-preparatory departments.

Young boys had been educated at Elleray since the 1970s, and boys were finally admitted to the senior school in 1999. Boys now make up half the school roll across all ages.

The school's name was simplified to 'Windermere School' in 2010.

== Headmistresses and Headmasters ==
- Catherine Sharpe (1863 - 1899)
- Elizabeth Hall (1863 - 1907)
- Helen Leigh (née Fulstow) (1899 - ?)
- E. M. Morrison (1907 - 1944)
- Vera Crampton (1944 - 1972)
- Michael Jenkins (1972 - 1996)
- Ross Hunter (1996 - 1999)
- Wendy Ellis (1999 - 2005)
- Allan Graham (2005 - 2010)
- Ian Lavender (2010 – 2021)
- Tom Hill (2022 – 2023)
- Jenny Davies (Interim, 2023)
- Frank Thompson (2024–Present)

== Curriculum ==
The National Curriculum is followed at all levels. Sixth form students may pursue the International Baccalaureate Diploma and the International Baccalaureate Career-related Programme. Students also have the opportunity to take BTEC courses in the Sixth Form.

== Estates ==
=== Browhead Campus ===
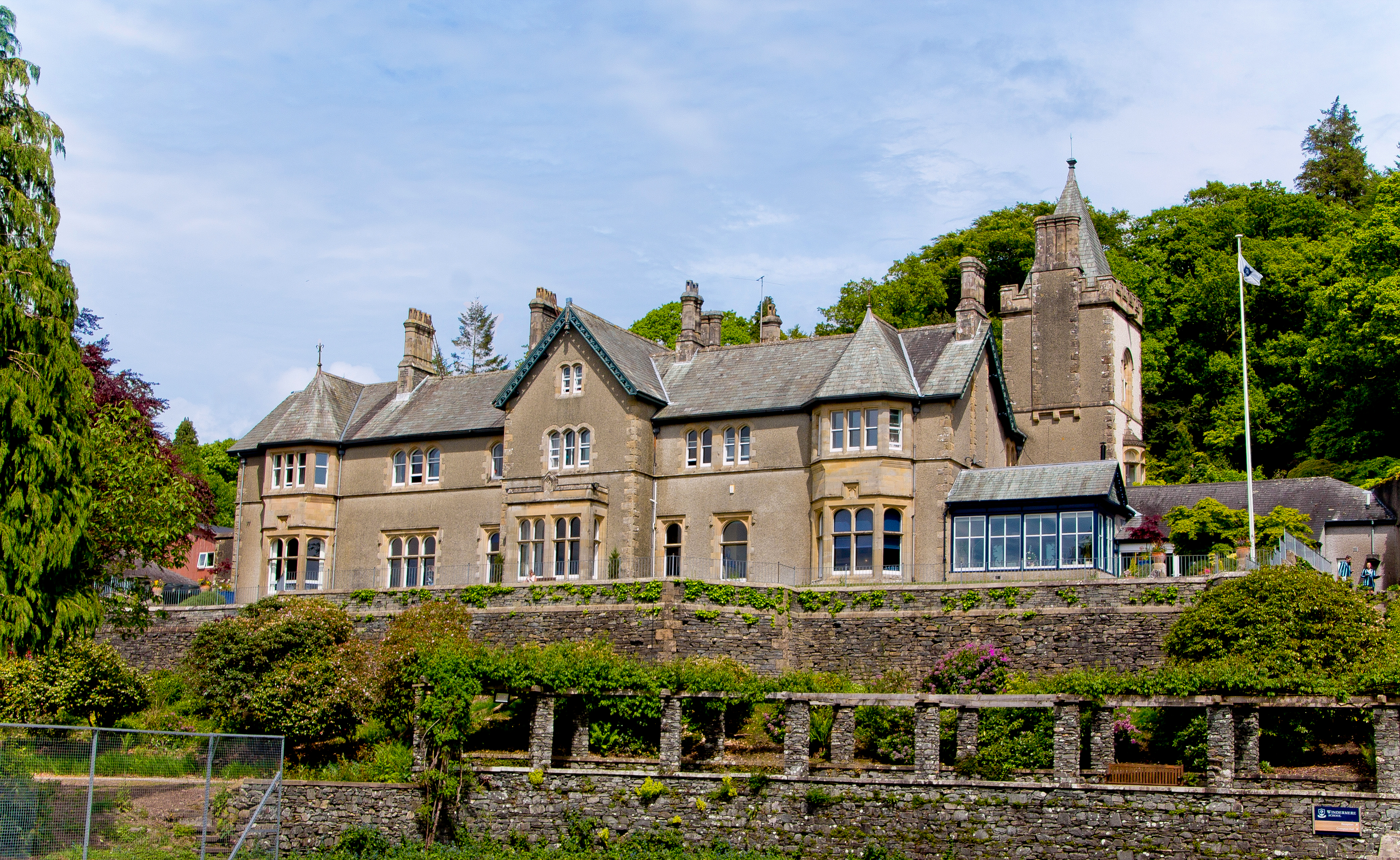
Browhead Campus photographed in Summer 2017

The Senior School is based at Browhead — a wooded, fellside estate, a mile from the village of Windermere. At its heart is a large Victorian house, home to the school's administrative centre, library, and girls' boarding accommodation on the upper floors. Crampton Hall was added in 1967. Other buildings on site include the Westmorland and Langdale boarding houses for Sixth Formers and boys respectively, a science complex, additional classrooms, Jenkins Centre (for the Music, Performing Arts and Languages departments, plus dining hall and kitchens), the Art and Technology department at South Lodge, additional staff accommodation at North Lodge, the Headmaster's house (Brow Wood), the Astroturf hockey pitch, tennis courts, sports hall and sports field. Much of the landscaping and planting date from the nineteenth century, and the estate is home to a variety of rare plants and trees.

=== Elleray Campus ===
Windermere School's former Elleray Campus occupies the neighbouring estate of Elleray, on the outskirts of Windermere. A large Victorian house forms the centre of the school, and more recent extensions house its infant and nursery departments. Elleray has its own sports pitches and tennis court, and the surrounding fields serve as a playground. Three eco-friendly 'pod' classrooms were built in 2009.

=== Hodge Howe Watersports Centre ===
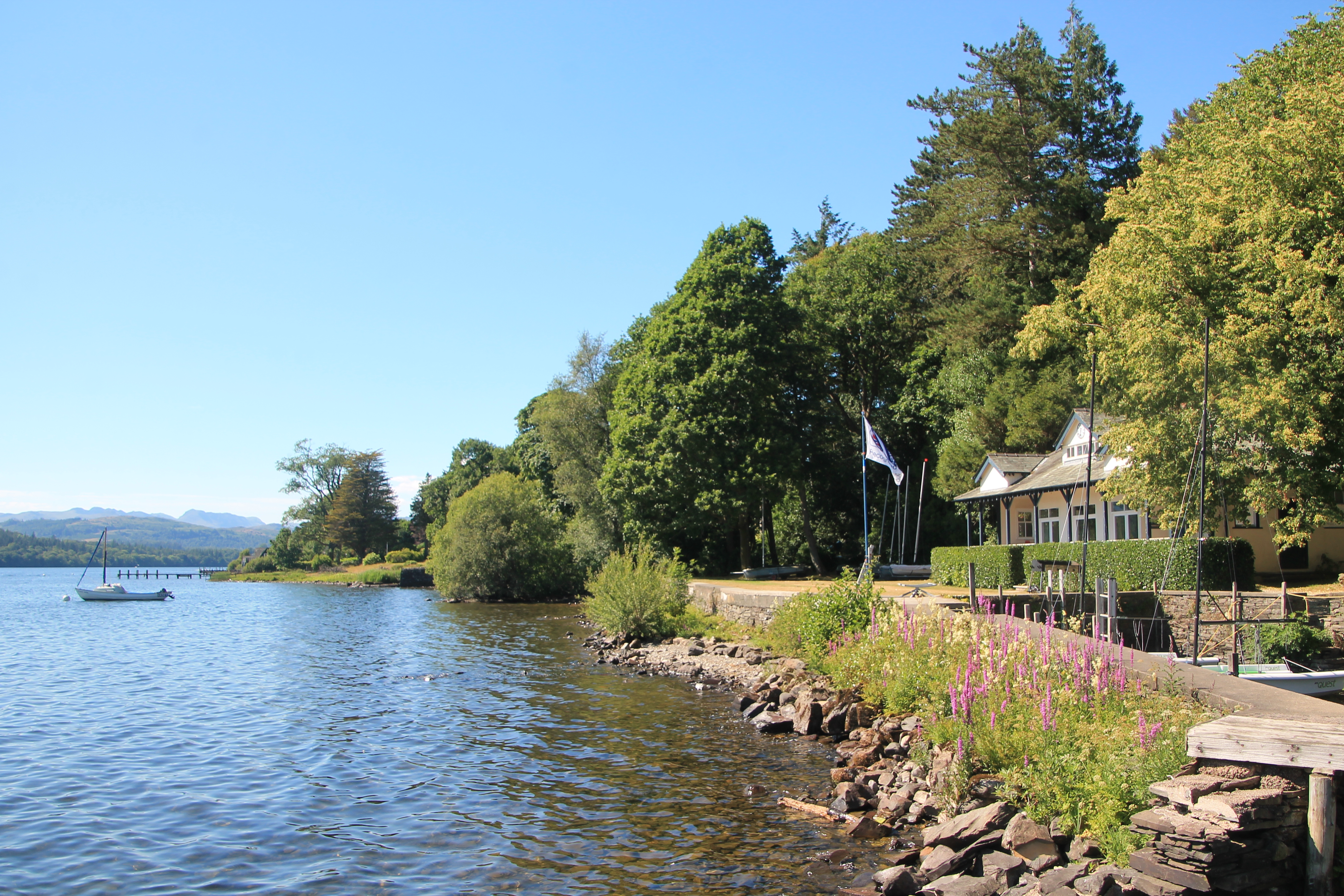
Hodge Howe Watersports Centre on the shores of Lake Windermere. Photographed in July 2018.

The school's third campus is its watersports centre, Hodge Howe, on the shore of Windermere. There is a central pavilion with changing facilities, a boathouse, harbour and extensive wooded grounds. Hodge Howe is an RYA Teaching Centre. In 2018, Hodge Howe became a British Youth Sailing Recognised Club by the RYA for its race training, becoming the first school facility in the UK to earn this status.

== Boarding ==
Boarding has been a central tradition since the school's foundation. Today, boarders account for approximately half the senior school pupils, and there are a small number from the primary school. Boarders live in one of two houses, all at the senior school site:

=== Westmorland House ===
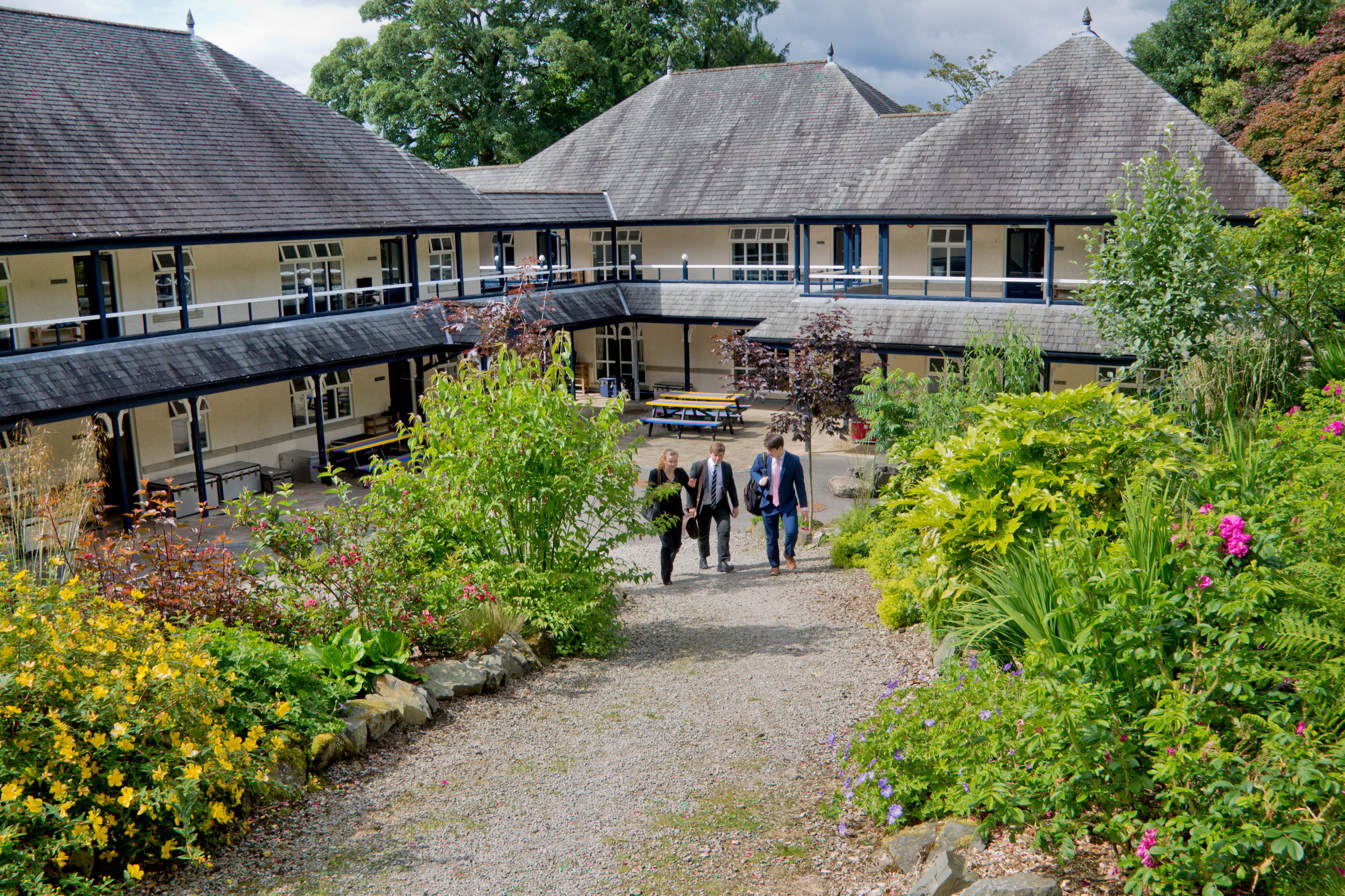
Westmorland Boarding House for students aged 16 to 18.

Westmorland House is the Sixth Form centre, acting as both boarding house and study centre for students aged 16 to 18. Boarders live in single-sex flats of five, complete with kitchenette and a common room. Day students are also assigned to a flat. The Houseparents have their own flat in the building, as do other house staff.

=== Langdale House ===
Langdale houses boy and girl boarders from the ages of eight to 16. Purpose-built in a Scandinavian style in 2001, it operates the same sleeping arrangements as Browhead.

== Houses ==
The school is divided into four houses; Cavendish (Red), Flemyng (Blue), Lonsdale (Green) and Strickland (Yellow). Houses are an essential part of Windermere School, giving students the opportunity to take part in events and competitions. Upon joining the school, students are assigned a house at random, with any siblings being assigned the same house.

== Uniform ==
Girls wear a black skirt and black-jumper worn over a white and navy striped blouse from primary to senior school. In addition, girls still wear the striped 'deckchair' blazer — one of the few reminders of the school's seaside past. Senior boys wear black trousers and a jumper worn over a white shirt with a navy tie. Primary boys wear the striped 'deckchair' blazer and black trouser/shorts alongside the navy tie.

Sixth form students wear formal attire of their own choosing, including a black blazer.

== Stannites ==
Former Windermere pupils are known as 'Stannites', a word derived from the school's original name. The Stannite Association organises annual reunions and other events. Notable Stannites include:

- Jackie Baillie, Labour MSP for Dumbarton
