= Jackie Baillie =

Scottish Labour politician

Dame Jackie Baillie DBE MSP
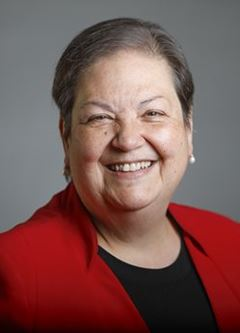
- Official portrait, 2026

Deputy Leader of the Scottish Labour Party
- Incumbent
- Assumed office 3 April 2020
- Leader: Richard Leonard; Herself (Acting); Anas Sarwar; Herself (Acting); Michael Marra
- Preceded by: Lesley Laird

Acting Leader of the Scottish Labour Party
- In office 23 July 2026 – 19 September 2026
- UK party leader: Andy Burnham
- Preceded by: Anas Sarwar
- Succeeded by: Michael Marra
- In office 14 January 2021 – 27 February 2021
- UK party leader: Keir Starmer
- Preceded by: Richard Leonard
- Succeeded by: Anas Sarwar
- In office 15 November 2017 – 18 November 2017
- UK party leader: Jeremy Corbyn
- Preceded by: Alex Rowley (Acting)
- Succeeded by: Richard Leonard

Minister for Social Justice
- In office 27 October 2000 – 8 November 2001
- First Minister: Henry McLeish
- Preceded by: Wendy Alexander
- Succeeded by: Iain Gray

Member of the Scottish Parliament for Dumbarton
- Incumbent
- Assumed office 6 May 1999
- Preceded by: Constituency established
- Majority: 1,786 (5.6%)

Scottish Labour portfolios
- 2023–present: General Election campaign co-coordinator
- 2021–present; 2009–2013: Shadow Cabinet Secretary for NHS Recovery, Health and Social Care and Drugs Policy (Note: Health, Social Care and Equalities (2021–2023); Health and Wellbeing (2009–2013.)
- 2020–2021: Shadow Cabinet Secretary for Finance
- 2014–2018: Shadow Cabinet Secretary for Economy, Jobs and Fair Work (Note: Finance, Constitution and Economy (2014–15); Public Services and Wealth Creation (2015–16))

Personal details
- Born: Jacqueline Marie Barnes; 15 January 1964 (age 62) British Hong Kong
- Party: Labour
- Spouse: Stephen Baillie (m. 1982)
- Children: 1
- Education: New College Lanarkshire; University of Strathclyde; University of Glasgow
- Website: Official website

Dame Jacqueline Marie Baillie DBE MSP (née Barnes; born 15 January 1964) is a Scottish politician who has served as Deputy Leader of the Scottish Labour Party since 2020. She has been Member of the Scottish Parliament (MSP) for the Dumbarton constituency since 1999. She also served as acting Leader of the Scottish Labour Party in 2017, 2021, and in 2026.

Born in British Hong Kong, Baillie was educated at St Anne's School, Windermere before studying at Cumbernauld College and the University of Strathclyde. After working in local government, she was elected at the 1999 Scottish Parliament election and served in the Scottish Executive as Minister for Social Justice under Henry McLeish.

Baillie has been acting Leader of Scottish Labour on three occasions. The first was in 2017, during a period when then acting Leader Alex Rowley was suspended from the party. He had himself been filling the role on a temporary basis following the resignation of Kezia Dugdale. In April 2020, she was elected as Deputy Leader of the Scottish Labour Party. In this role she served as acting Leader for six weeks following Richard Leonard's resignation in January 2021 and between July and September 2026 after Anas Sarwar resigned from Holyrood to become a UK Minister in Andy Burnham's new Government.

== Early life and career ==
Baillie was born on 15 January 1964 in British Hong Kong to Sophie and Frank Barnes. After education at the private St Anne's School, Windermere in the Lake District, she studied at Cumbernauld College and the University of Strathclyde. She went on to work as a resource centre manager at Strathkelvin District Council and a community economic development manager at East Dunbartonshire Council.

== Political career ==
=== Scottish Executive: 1999–2007 ===
Baillie was chair of Scottish Labour in 1997. She was first elected at the inaugural election for the Scottish Parliament in May 1999. A member of the Scottish Executive, she served as Minister for Social Justice when Henry McLeish was First Minister of Scotland, during which time she was involved with the Homelessness Task Force. She was re-elected in 2003 and became a member of the Scottish Parliament's Justice 2 Committee and Public Petitions Committee. She supported the 2003 invasion of Iraq.

=== Opposition: 2007–2020 ===
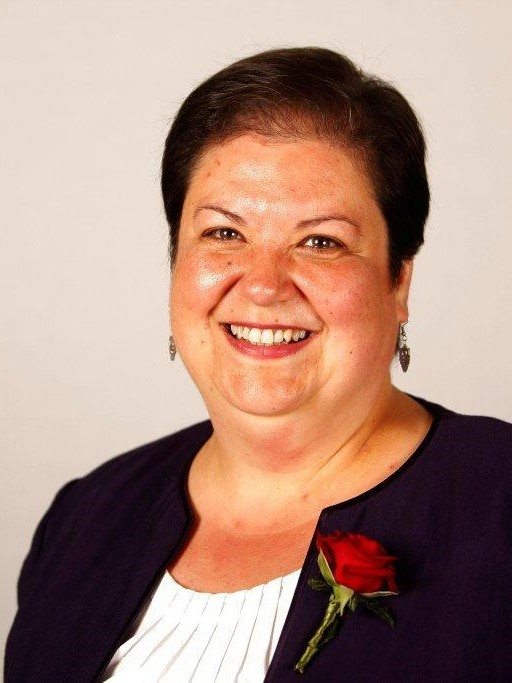
Official parliamentary portrait, 2011

In December 2007, Baillie defended Labour leader Wendy Alexander on Newsnight Scotland, during the controversy regarding alleged illegal donations to Alexander's leadership campaign.

In 2009, Baillie successfully brought into being an act of the Scottish Parliament, with the unanimous support of all MSPs, to allow for greater protection of disabled parking spaces.

Baillie has opposed minimum pricing of alcohol, being unconvinced about the overall benefits. In 2010, she stated it would not be the best way of tackling the country's alcohol-related problems but instead backed a tax-based alternative amongst other measures. The legislation was passed setting a minimum unit pricing floor price for a unit of alcohol of 50 pence per unit.

Baillie held the position of Scottish Labour Spokesperson for Health in the Shadow Cabinet of Iain Gray, retaining the post in December 2011 following the election of Johann Lamont as Gray's successor. When Lamont announced a major shakeup of the Labour frontbench team on 28 June 2013, Baillie was moved from Health to Scottish Labour Spokesperson for Social Justice and Welfare.

On 27 March 2014, Baillie stood in for Johann Lamont at First Minister's Questions while Lamont was attending the funeral of veteran Labour politician Tony Benn. She also stood in at FMQs following Lamont's resignation as Labour leader in October 2014. Baillie ruled herself out of standing in the leadership election that followed Lamont's departure, stating that she wanted a "supporting role" rather than to be Labour leader.

As a backbench MSP, Baillie campaigned for a public inquiry into a lethal outbreak of Clostridioides difficile infections at the Vale of Leven Hospital in her constituency. The inquiry into the outbreak cost £10 million, while the families were offered £1 million, something which prompted Baillie to plead Health Secretary Shona Robison for greater compensation for those affected, during a session of the Scottish Parliament in November 2014.

In December 2017, Baillie was reduced to tears when raising the concern of fire safety following the deaths of two men in the Cameron House Hotel Fire.

After Kezia Dugdale resigned as Scottish Labour leader in August 2017 and interim leader Alex Rowley was suspended, Baillie served as acting leader until Richard Leonard was elected as the new leader following the 2017 Scottish Labour leadership election. Baillie continued to serve as Scottish Labour Spokesperson for Economy, Jobs and Fair Work until October 2018 when she was sacked by Leonard, who also replaced her in the role.

=== Deputy Leader of the Scottish Labour Party: 2020–present ===
In January 2020, Baillie announced that she would be standing as a candidate for the post of Deputy Leader of the Scottish Labour Party. On 3 April, it was announced she had won the contest by 10,311 votes to Matt Kerr's 7,528 votes. After she was elected, Leonard reappointed her to his frontbench as Scottish Labour Spokesperson for Finance. She served as acting Leader of the Scottish Labour Party since after the resignation of Leonard on 14 January 2021 and served until the election of Anas Sarwar as leader.

On 1 March 2021, Baillie was moved from shadowing Finance to Health, Social Care and Equalities.

Between 2020 and 2021, Baillie was a member of Committee on the Scottish Government Handling of Harassment Complaints that concluded that the Scottish Government's handling of harassment complaints against Alex Salmond was "seriously flawed". As a committee member, Baillie quizzed both Salmond and Nicola Sturgeon, asking the latter: "You have described these errors as catastrophic. That's a strong word, tell me why then nobody has resigned? Nobody has taken responsibility of this, because at the heart of this two women have been let down." Former BBC journalist Andrew Neil said of Baillie's questioning, "As a professional interviewer... there were many times when I thought Jackie Baillie was the only one that knew the questions to ask."

On 19 March 2021, the findings of the committee were pre-emptively leaked to the media by an MSP. Baillie backed an inquiry into the leak and said: "The leaks against the women were particularly bad, because they had the bravery to come forward to speak to the committee. It was entirely inappropriate that that information was leaked to the public domain."

In the run up to the 2021 Scottish Parliament election, former SNP Depute Leader Jim Sillars donated £2,000 to her campaign to be re-elected. “I would prefer her in the parliament to a clone on the backbenches," Sillars said. "I don’t think there is any doubt she is an asset to the parliament. My concern, in donating to Jackie Baillie, was to have a very able person in parliament."

Ballie was re-elected in May 2021 with an increased majority of 1,483, with Dumbarton becoming the only seat to have voted Labour for the entirety of the devolved era.

Baillie was appointed Dame Commander of the Order of the British Empire (DBE) in the 2023 Birthday Honours for political and public service.

In the 2026 election, despite Scottish Labour's vote share decreasing, Baillie won her seat of Dumbarton with a majority of 1,786 votes. This meant that Baillie and First Minister John Swinney were the only MSPs elected to the seventh session of the Scottish Parliament to have served continuously since its inaugural election in 1999. In July 2026, she ruled herself out as being a candidate in the 2026 Scottish Labour leadership election.

== Personal life ==
Baillie married Stephen Baillie in 1982. They are now divorced. She lives in Dumbarton with her daughter. During her time as MSP, she studied for a Master of Science degree in Local Economic Development at the University of Glasgow.

== Notes ==
Scottish Parliament
New parliament Scotland Act 1998	Member of the Scottish Parliament for Dumbarton; 1999–present	Incumbent
