= Leader of the Scottish Labour Party =

Head of the Labour Party in Scotland

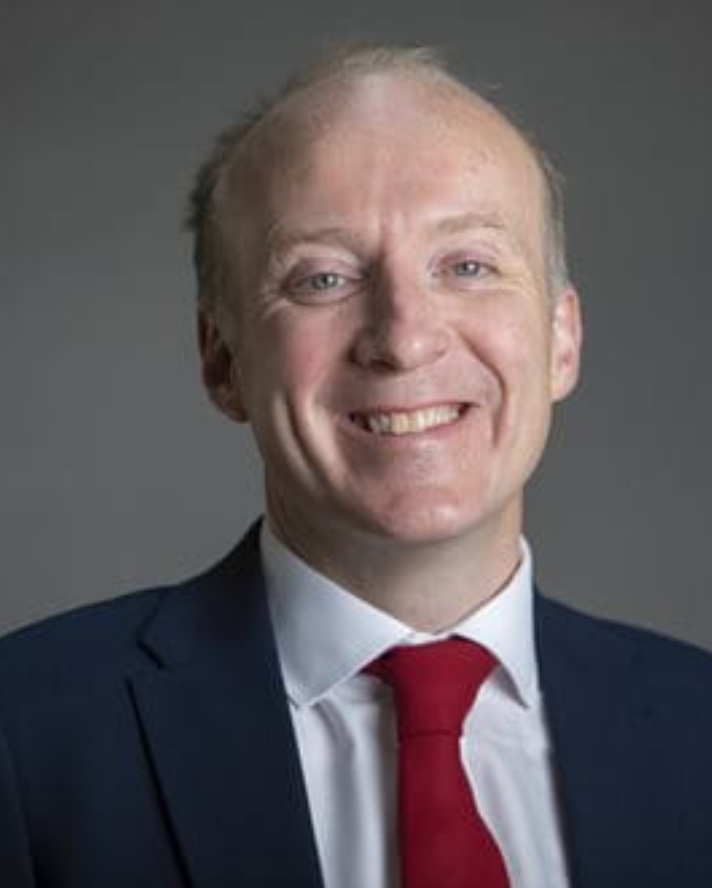
- Incumbent; Michael Marra since 19 September 2026
- Member of: Scottish Parliament (since 1999); Parliament of the United Kingdom (since 2011); Local government in Scotland (since 2011)
- Inaugural holder: Donald Dewar
- Formation: 7 May 1999
- Deputy: Jackie Baillie

The office of Leader of the Labour Party in Scotland was established when the Scottish Parliament was formed in 1998 prior to its inaugural election. Until the Murphy and Boyack review in 2011, the office was Leader of the Labour Party in the Scottish Parliament and restricted to members of the Scottish Parliament. Since the review, the office has been opened up to all elected Scottish Labour politicians, including those involved in the Parliament of the United Kingdom and local government.

== List ==
=== Leader of the Labour Party in the Scottish Parliament ===
No.	Image	Name	Term start	Term end	Tenure	First Minister	Source
1		Donald Dewar	19 September 1998	11 October 2000	2 years, 22 days	Himself	
2		Henry McLeish	27 October 2000 (Note: Acting: 11 October 2000 – 27 October 2000)	8 November 2001	1 year, 12 days	Himself	
―		Cathy Jamieson	8 November 2001	22 November 2001	14 days	Jim Wallace (acting)	
3		Jack McConnell	22 November 2001	15 August 2007	5 years, 266 days	Jim Wallace (acting)	
3		Jack McConnell	22 November 2001	15 August 2007	5 years, 266 days	Himself	
3		Jack McConnell	22 November 2001	15 August 2007	5 years, 266 days	Alex Salmond	
―		Cathy Jamieson	15 August 2007	14 September 2007	30 days	Alex Salmond	
4		Wendy Alexander	14 September 2007	28 June 2008	288 days	Alex Salmond	
―		Cathy Jamieson	28 June 2008	13 September 2008	77 days	Alex Salmond	
5		Iain Gray	13 September 2008	17 December 2011	3 years, 95 days	Alex Salmond	

=== Leader of the Labour Party in Scotland ===
No.	Image	Name	Term start	Term end	Tenure	First Minister	Source
6		Johann Lamont	17 December 2011	24 October 2014	2 years, 311 days	Alex Salmond	
—		Anas Sarwar	24 October 2014	13 December 2014	50 days	Alex Salmond	
—		Anas Sarwar	24 October 2014	13 December 2014	50 days	Nicola Sturgeon	
7		Jim Murphy (as Leader of the Scottish Labour Party)	13 December 2014	13 June 2015	182 days	Nicola Sturgeon	
7		Kezia Dugdale (as Leader of the Labour Party in the Scottish Parliament)	13 December 2014	13 June 2015	182 days	Nicola Sturgeon	
–		Iain Gray	13 June 2015	15 August 2015	63 days	Nicola Sturgeon	
8		Kezia Dugdale	15 August 2015	29 August 2017	2 years, 2 days	Nicola Sturgeon	
―		Alex Rowley	29 August 2017	15 November 2017	78 days	Nicola Sturgeon	
―		Jackie Baillie	15 November 2017	18 November 2017	3 days	Nicola Sturgeon	
9		Richard Leonard	18 November 2017	14 January 2021	3 years, 57 days	Nicola Sturgeon	
–		Jackie Baillie	14 January 2021	27 February 2021	44 days	Nicola Sturgeon	
10		Anas Sarwar	27 February 2021	23 July 2026	5 years, 146 days	Nicola Sturgeon	
10		Anas Sarwar	27 February 2021	23 July 2026	5 years, 146 days	Humza Yousaf	
10		Anas Sarwar	27 February 2021	23 July 2026	5 years, 146 days	John Swinney	
–		Jackie Baillie	23 July 2026	19 September 2026	86 days	John Swinney	
11		Michael Marra	19 September 2026	Incumbent	28 days	John Swinney	
