= Kezia Dugdale =

Scottish politician (born 1981)

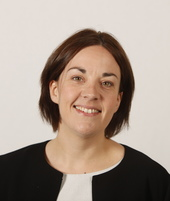
- Official portrait, 2016

Leader of the Scottish Labour Party
- In office 15 August 2015 – 29 August 2017
- Deputy: Alex Rowley
- UK party leader: Harriet Harman (Acting); Jeremy Corbyn
- Preceded by: Jim Murphy (Note: Iain Gray acted from 13 June 2015 to 15 August 2015)
- Succeeded by: Richard Leonard (Note: Alex Rowley acted from 29 August 2017 to 15 November 2017 followed by Jackie Baillie from 15 to 18 November 2017)

Deputy Leader of the Scottish Labour Party
- In office 13 December 2014 – 13 June 2015
- Leader: Jim Murphy
- Preceded by: Anas Sarwar
- Succeeded by: Alex Rowley

Member of the Scottish Parliament for Lothian (1 of 7 Regional MSPs)
- In office 5 May 2011 – 15 July 2019
- Succeeded by: Sarah Boyack (Note: Normally, regional MSPs do not have individual predecessors and successors. However, Dugdale retired her seat during a sitting parliament so was succeeded by Boyack.)

Scottish Labour portfolios
- 2016–2017: Shadow Cabinet Secretary for Finance and the Constitution
- 2013–2014: Shadow Cabinet Secretary for Education and Lifelong Learning

Personal details
- Born: Kezia Alexandra Ross Dugdale; 28 August 1981 (age 45) Aberdeen, Scotland
- Party: Independent (since 2019)
- Other political affiliations: Labour Co-op (until 2019)
- Spouse: Jenny Gilruth (m. 2022)
- Education: University of Aberdeen (LLB); University of Edinburgh (MSc)
- Website: Archived website

Kezia Alexandra Ross Dugdale (born 28 August 1981) is a Scottish former politician who served as Leader of the Scottish Labour Party from 2015 to 2017. A former member of the Scottish Labour Party and Co-operative Party, she was a Member of the Scottish Parliament (MSP) for the Lothian region from 2011 to 2019.

Born in Aberdeen and raised in Dundee, Dugdale studied law at the University of Aberdeen and Policy Studies at the University of Edinburgh, where she was a campaigns and welfare adviser. After leaving university, she worked as an election agent, political researcher and parliamentary officer. She was elected at the 2011 Scottish Parliament election on the Lothian regional list and became Deputy Leader of the Scottish Labour Party in 2014.

Dugdale was elected Leader of the Scottish Labour Party in the 2015 Scottish Labour leadership election. She led the party into the 2016 Scottish Parliament election; where it finished third behind the Scottish National Party (SNP) and Scottish Conservatives; Dugdale failed to be elected to the Edinburgh Eastern constituency, once again being elected on the Lothian regional list. During the 2017 general election, the party held their previously sole seat and gained a further six seats from the SNP. She resigned as leader in August 2017 to "pass on the baton" to a successor who would lead the party into the 2021 Scottish Parliament election.

After leaving frontbench politics, Dugdale worked as a columnist and appeared as a contestant on the seventeenth series of ITV reality show I'm a Celebrity...Get Me Out of Here! in November 2017. She later resigned her seat and Scottish Labour membership in July 2019 and accepted the role of director of the John Smith Centre for Public Service at the University of Glasgow. In 2024 Dugdale became Associate Director of the Centre for Public Policy at the University of Glasgow.

== Early life and education ==
Dugdale was born in Aberdeen on 28 August 1981. She attended secondary school at Harris Academy in Dundee, where she was Head Girl. She studied law at the University of Aberdeen from 1999 until 2003, and completed a master's degree in policy studies from 2004 until 2006 at the University of Edinburgh. Whilst attending university, she worked as campaigns and welfare adviser for Edinburgh University Students' Association and as public affairs officer at the National Union of Students Scotland.

== Early political career ==
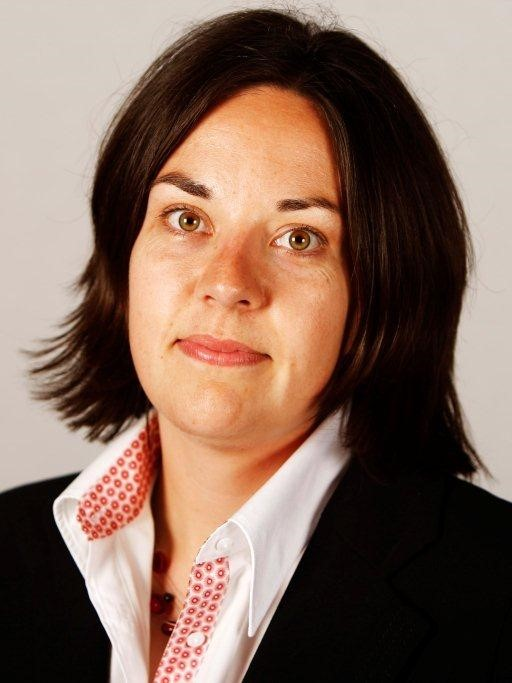
Official parliamentary portrait, 2011

Dugdale sat on Scottish Labour's Policy Forum from 2006 until 2008, as well as serving as an election agent to both Sarah Boyack MSP and Sheila Gilmore MP. She had also volunteered as a researcher in the parliamentary office of Pauline McNeill MSP. She worked from 2007 to 2011 for the Labour Lothian regional MSP George Foulkes, by then also a Labour life peer, as his parliamentary office manager and political adviser.

In the 2011 Scottish Parliament election, Dugdale was elected to the Scottish Parliament as Scottish Labour's second candidate on their list for the Lothian region. She served as a Scottish Labour and Co-operative Party member and sat on the Local Government and Regeneration and Subordinate Legislation Committees. Dugdale was appointed as Scottish Labour's Spokesperson for Education and Lifelong Learning on 29 June 2013.

Dugdale won the 2014 Scottish Labour deputy leadership election, succeeding Anas Sarwar, and defeating Katy Clark. As Scottish Labour leader Jim Murphy did not have a seat in the Scottish Parliament, she stood in for him at First Minister's Questions. On 13 June 2015, she resigned from the deputy leadership in order to contest the 2015 Scottish Labour leadership election. She was succeeded by Alex Rowley after the leadership election.

== Leader of the Scottish Labour Party ==
During the 2015 leadership election campaign, Dugdale said she would want to end the charitable status of private schools in Scotland which gives them tax breaks, a policy in her opinion unfair to state schools. In a July 2015 televised leadership debate, she said it was wrong the vast majority of the 232 Labour MPs abstained on the Conservative government's Welfare Reform and Work Bill in a second reading vote in the House of Commons. Following the resignation of Lord John Sewel on 28 July 2015, she said the House of Lords should no longer be an unelected chamber and should be moved to Glasgow. She won the leadership on 15 August, defeating Ken Macintosh.

During an August 2015 interview with The Guardian, Dugdale refused to publicly say who out of the four candidates in the UK Labour Party leadership election she supported, but did express serious doubts as to whether Jeremy Corbyn could ever become Prime Minister. After Corbyn had been elected as Leader of the Labour Party on 13 September, she revealed for the first time, on BBC Question Time on 30 October, she had voted for Yvette Cooper.

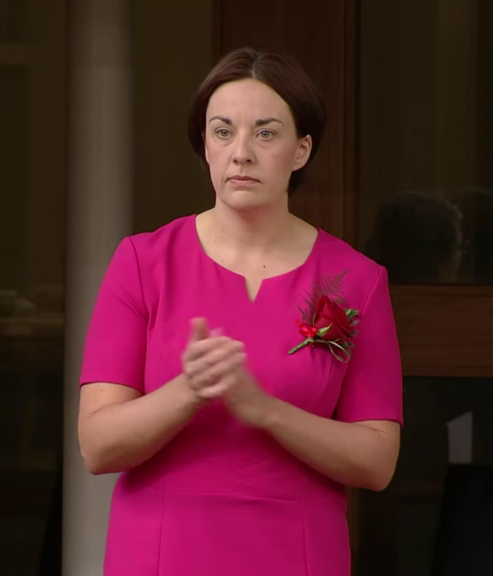
Dugdale back in the Scottish Parliament following her defeat in the 2016 election

Dugdale led Scottish Labour into the 2016 Scottish Parliament election. Dugdale wanted to re-affirm Scottish Labour's core beliefs and convey to the electorate what the party stood for. She focused her campaign on a proposal to increase income tax to tackle underfunding of services by the Scottish National Party government, particularly in education. Meanwhile, the Scottish Conservatives' ambitions were to oppose Scottish independence and push Ruth Davidson as an effective leader opposed to the SNP's governmental agenda. The results put Scottish Labour behind both the SNP and Scottish Conservatives, with the party falling into third place from second. The party made a net loss of 12 constituency seats, gaining only one and holding another two, but retained 21 of its 22 regional seats which assign additional members to address imbalance in constituency results. Dugdale was once again returned as an additional member for the Lothian region, having failed to win the Edinburgh Eastern constituency from the SNP by 5,087 votes.

On 29 June 2016, Dugdale called for Jeremy Corbyn to resign from his position as Leader of the Labour Party, after 174-to-40 Labour MPs voted no-confidence in his leadership. She said when 80% of his own MPs no longer supported him, Corbyn could not properly function as Labour leader or Leader of the Opposition in parliament, nor could he form a potential alternative government. On 22 August, she declared her support for Owen Smith in the 2016 Labour Party leadership election but also said her position would remain tenable were Corbyn to win re-election. After Corbyn won the leadership election, she first said that this made the Labour Party unelectable, then stated the opposite.

Dugdale was Leader of the Scottish Labour Party during the 2017 general election. In the previous general election in 2015, the party lost 40 of its 41 seats in what was a landslide victory for the SNP, who won 56 of the 59 seats in Scotland. Nicola Sturgeon based the 2017 SNP campaign on a promise to seek a second Scottish independence referendum with the aim of keeping an independent Scotland inside the European Union, a referendum Ruth Davidson and the Scottish Conservatives were opposed to. Dugdale again campaigned on what she saw as the need for an income tax increase to tackle education underfunding by the SNP. The results gave Scottish Labour seven seats. In their previously sole seat Edinburgh South, Ian Murray was returned with a super-majority of over 15,000, and the party gained a further six seats from the SNP. However, the party came in third place behind the SNP with 35 seats and Scottish Conservatives with 13.

On 29 August 2017, Dugdale resigned as leader of Scottish Labour with immediate effect, commenting that it was time to "pass on the baton" to someone else. She opined that her successor needed the "space and time" to prepare for the next Scottish Parliament election in 2021.

== Later career ==
In November 2017, ITV announced that Dugdale would appear as a contestant on its reality television series, I'm a Celebrity...Get Me Out of Here! It was subsequently reported that she faced disciplinary action from the Labour Party because she did not notify party managers she would be out of the country on non-work related business while the Scottish Parliament was in session. On 21 November, the party announced she would not be suspended.

Dugdale made her first appearance on I'm a Celebrity...Get Me Out of Here! on 22 November. She became the second person to be eliminated from the show. Speaking about the experience afterwards, she said that she knew her appearance on the programme would be a "political gamble", but that she wanted to "take on the myth that every politician [is] old, white, male, pale and stale" and would return home "with [her] head held high". She expressed regrets of the effect of her appearances on the show during the first weeks of the new Labour leadership in Scotland, and received a written warning for agreeing to take part without approval from the Scottish Labour parliamentary group. She promised to donate her MSP's salary for her absence, and part of her show fees, to charity.

In 2018, Stuart Campbell, a blogger running the pro-independence Wings Over Scotland website, started defamation proceedings against Dugdale about comments she made as a columnist for the Daily Record about his Twitter activity, a case he lost. The judgement said Dugdale was incorrect to imply Campbell had been homophobic but her article was protected under the principle of fair comment.

On 29 April 2019, Dugdale announced she would be resigning as an MSP before the summer recess of the Scottish Parliament in order to take up the role of director of the John Smith Centre for Public Service at the University of Glasgow. On 15 July 2019, Dugdale resigned as a Member of the Scottish Parliament. The following day it was announced she would be succeeded by former transport minister Sarah Boyack, who had been a candidate on the Lothian regional list in 2016. On 10 October 2019, it was revealed she had also resigned from Scottish Labour that July, following disagreement with the party over leaving the European Union. In February 2024, Dugdale revealed that she had voted for the Scottish National Party in the 2019 European Parliament election over Brexit.

In March 2024, she became Associate Director of the Centre for Public Policy at the University of Glasgow.

In April 2026 Dugdale was announced as Chair of LGBTQ+ charity Stonewall.

== Personal life ==
In a 2016 interview with Mary Riddell for the Fabian Review, Dugdale said she was in a relationship with a woman but was disinclined to provide details of her private life. She first appeared in public with her partner Louise Riddell when they voted together in Edinburgh in the 2016 Scottish Parliament election.

In February 2017, Dugdale revealed the couple had separated shortly after the New Year and following nine years together. In July 2017, it was reported Dugdale was in a relationship with Mid Fife and Glenrothes MSP Jenny Gilruth, a member of the SNP, and the two had started dating around four months earlier. In June 2022, Dugdale married Gilruth in a private ceremony.

In September 2017, she was named Politician of the Year at the Icon Awards, an awards ceremony celebrating Scotland's LGBT community. Dugdale's late father was retired teacher Jeff Dugdale, a campaigner for the Scottish independence movement. Her relationship with her father had been left "sad" and "sore" by his public criticisms of her on Twitter and his support for Stuart Campbell in the defamation case against her. Jeff Dugdale died on 10 September 2021.

Dugdale says her interests include the theatre, Scottish crime novels, and the city of Edinburgh. She supports Hibernian F.C., living close to their ground at Easter Road. She has lived in the Lochend, and Meadowbank, area since 2006. She is a member of Unite the Union and the Community trade union. From 2014 until 2018, she published a weekly column in the Daily Record. She has also written for LabourList and Progress.

== Notes ==
Scottish Parliament
Preceded by Fiona Hyslop	Member of the Scottish Parliament for Lothian; 2011–2019	Succeeded by Sarah Boyack
Party political offices
Preceded by Anas Sarwar	Deputy Leader of the Scottish Labour Party; 2014–2015	Succeeded by Alex Rowley
Preceded by Jim Murphy	Leader of the Scottish Labour Party; 2015–2017	Succeeded by Richard Leonard
