= 2018 Scottish Labour deputy leadership election =

- 28 May 2018
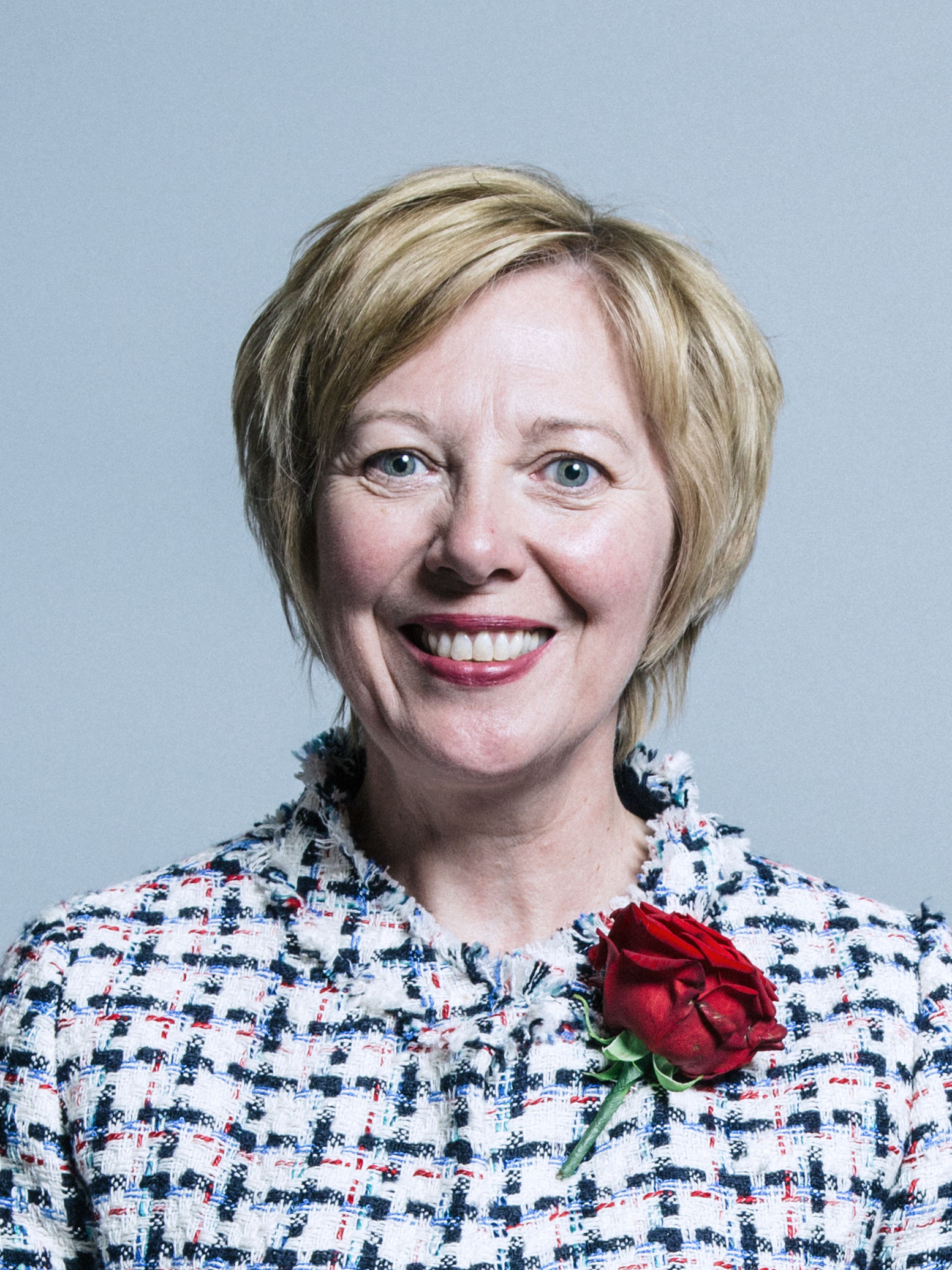
Candidate	Lesley Laird
Popular vote	Unopposed
Deputy leader before election
Alex Rowley
Elected Deputy leader
Lesley Laird

The 2018 Scottish Labour Party deputy leadership election was an internal party election to choose a new deputy leader of the Labour Party in the Scottish Parliament. It was triggered by the resignation on 16 December 2017 of Alex Rowley, who had been suspended from the post on 15 November 2017 following allegations that he had sent abusive text messages to a former partner.

== Result ==
The only candidate nominated was Lesley Laird, who had been the member of parliament (MP) for Kirkcaldy and Cowdenbeath since general election in June 2017. Laird was therefore elected unopposed. She had been acting deputy leader since Rowley's resignation.
