= The Mercat Shopping Centre =

Coordinates: 56.110°N 3.158°W

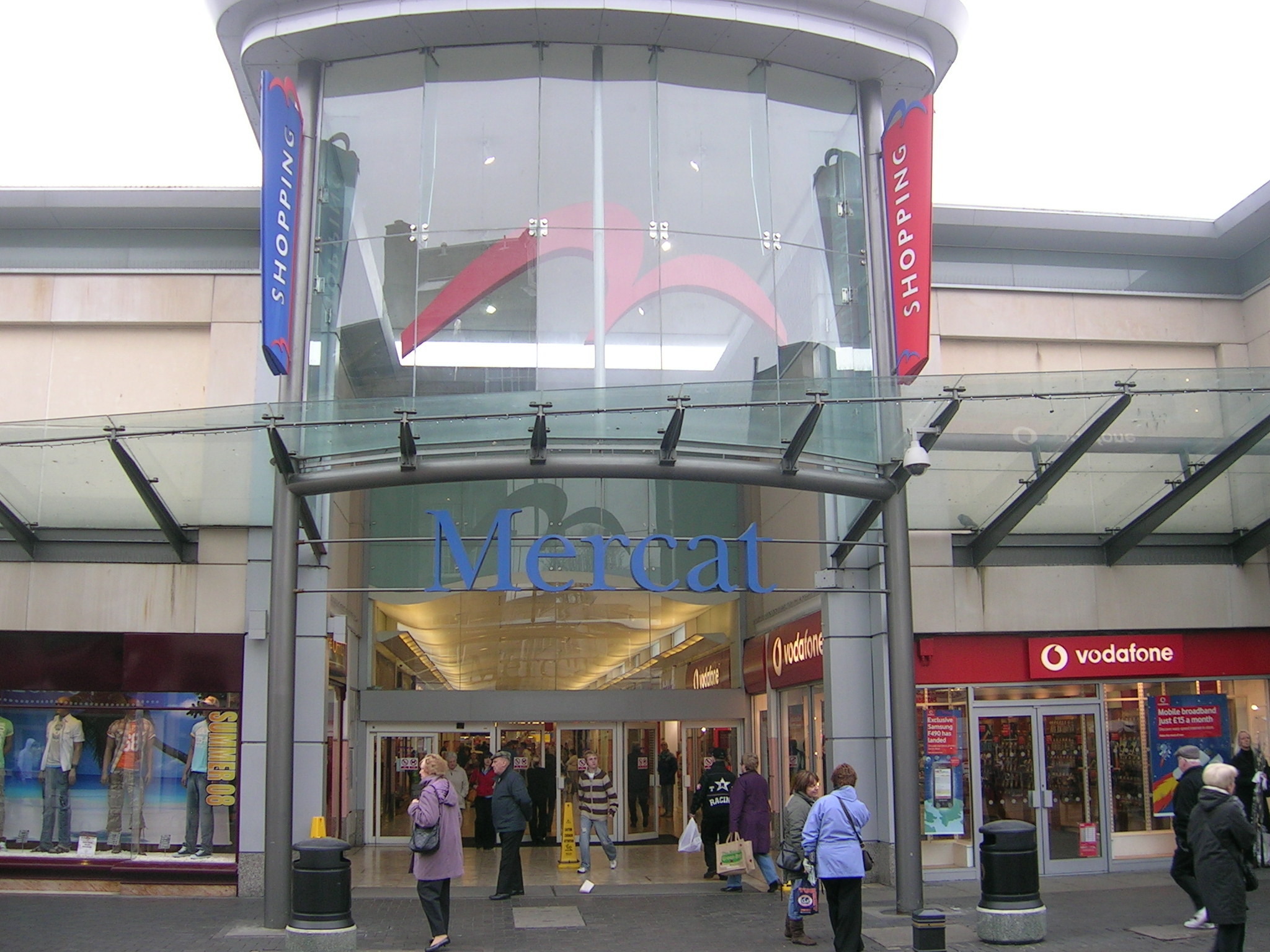
- High Street entrance
- Location: Kirkcaldy, Fife, Scotland, United Kingdom
- Address: Management Offices, High Street
- Opened: 1972; 1983 (extension)
- Developer: Michael Laird & Partners (extension)
- Owner: Mars Pensions Fund
- Num. of stores: 63
- Num. of anchor tenants: 11
- Floor area: 20,000 square metres (230,000 square feet)
- Website: https://mercatshoppingcentre.co.uk/

The Mercat Shopping Centre (/ˈmɛrkət/ MERR-kət, from the Scots meaning "market") is a shopping centre in Kirkcaldy, Fife, Scotland, United Kingdom. The Mercat – including surrounding areas – accounts for at least 30% of all the floorspace in Kirkcaldy town centre, which in total is 46,000-square-metre (500,000 sq ft) and providing as much as 200 shops, making Kirkcaldy the largest shopping area in Fife.

The first phase of the centre was completed in 1972, and the second phase 1981–1983. A refurbishment was completed in 1997. A proposal to extend the shopping centre for a third phase is pending.

The shopping centre is owned by Mars Pension Fund and managed by Lasalle Investment Management.

== History ==
Kirkcaldy Town council considered a controversial redevelopment of Kirkcaldy town centre in January 1964, which was only passed by a narrow margin, after a fiercely contested public inquiry. A plot of land situated between the High Street and the Esplanade was purchased in April 1964 for demolition as the new site of the shopping centre. This would entail building over four streets, which would then disappear - Market Street, Cowan Street, Rose Street and Thistle Street.

=== First phase ===
Construction of the shopping centre was supposed to commence in Autumn 1967, but the project was delayed until the early 1970s. Work finally began on the first phase of The Mercat in 1971 – and buildings numbered from 94–112 in the High Street, including the reputed birthplace of Adam Smith, were demolished. This was to contain initially 29 units, a major department store and one multi-storey car park - for completion in 1972.

=== Second phase ===
The success of the Mercat prompted an extension which was given the green light in 1978. The extension dubbed "Mercat II" was built, alongside a second multi-storey car park, by Michael Laird and Partners between 1981 and 1983. The car park, despite only being two-storey, was known for presenting a deep roof, identical dormers and separated wrought-iron inserts on the wall.
