= Alex Rowley =

Former Deputy Leader of the Scottish Labour Party

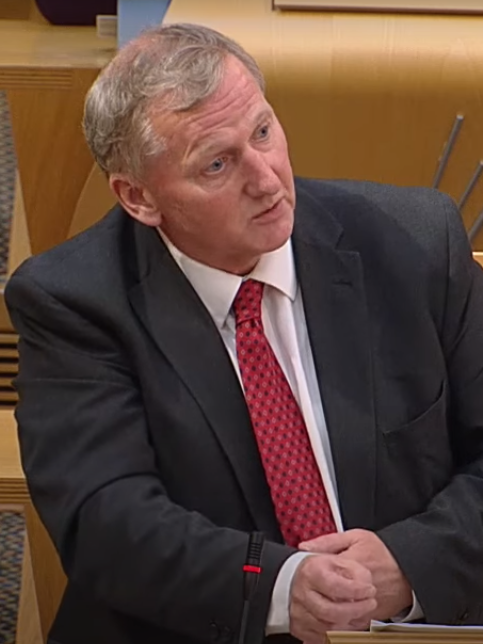
- Rowley in 2020

Leader of the Scottish Labour Party
- Acting; 29 August 2017 – 15 November 2017
- UK party leader: Jeremy Corbyn
- Preceded by: Kezia Dugdale
- Succeeded by: Jackie Baillie (acting)

Deputy Leader of the Scottish Labour Party
- In office 15 August 2015 – 16 December 2017
- Leader: Kezia Dugdale; Richard Leonard
- Preceded by: Kezia Dugdale
- Succeeded by: Lesley Laird

Member of the Scottish Parliament for Mid Scotland and Fife (1 of 7 Regional MSPs)
- In office 6 May 2016 – 9 April 2026

Member of the Scottish Parliament for Cowdenbeath
- In office 23 January 2014 – 23 March 2016
- Preceded by: Helen Eadie
- Succeeded by: Annabelle Ewing

Scottish Labour portfolios
- 2016–2017: Shadow Cabinet Secretary for Community, Social Security and Equalities
- 2018–2019: Shadow Cabinet Secretary for Communities and Local Government
- 2019–2020: Shadow Cabinet Secretary for Brexit and the Constitution
- 2021–present: Shadow Cabinet Secretary for Transport, Infrastructure and Connectivity

Personal details
- Born: Alexander Andrew Penman Rowley; 30 November 1963 (age 62) Dunfermline, Scotland
- Party: Scottish Labour
- Children: 3, including Danielle
- Education: University of Edinburgh
- Website: Official website

Alexander Andrew Penman Rowley (born 30 November 1963) is a Scottish politician who served as Deputy Leader of the Scottish Labour Party from 2015 to 2017 and acting leader of the party from August to November 2017. He served as a Member of the Scottish Parliament (MSP) from 2014, firstly for the Cowdenbeath constituency and the Mid Scotland and Fife region from 2016 to 2026. He has been described as being on the political left of the party.

Born in Dunfermline, Rowley studied community education at the University of Edinburgh before serving as General Secretary of the Scottish Labour Party and on Fife Council. First elected to the Scottish Parliament at a by-election in January 2014, he lost Cowdenbeath to Annabelle Ewing of the SNP at the 2016 election. However, he was returned as an additional member for Mid Scotland and Fife.

Following the resignation of Kezia Dugdale, he served as acting Leader of the Scottish Labour Party during the 2017 Scottish Labour leadership election. He served as Shadow Cabinet Secretary for Communities and Local Government from 2018 to 2019 and Shadow Cabinet Secretary for Brexit and Constitutional Relations from 2019 to 2020. He is currently Shadow Cabinet Secretary for Transport, Infrastructure and Connectivity.

== Early life ==
Born in Dunfermline and raised in Kelty, Rowley was educated at St Columba's High School in Dunfermline. He studied for an MA Honours in sociology and politics at Newbattle Abbey College in Dalkeith and the University of Edinburgh and later for an MSc in community education at Edinburgh.

== Political career ==
Rowley was General Secretary of the Scottish Labour Party for one year, from May 1998 to May 1999. He was first elected to Fife Regional Council in 1990 when he was Chairman of Finance, and he later became the first leader of the new Fife Council, a position he returned to in 2012 until his election to the Scottish Parliament in 2014.

Prior to his election to the Scottish Parliament, Rowley was a Fife Council member (re-elected in 2007) and Labour Council Group Leader. He worked as an education official with the TUC and worked for five years as an assistant, election agent and constituency manager to Gordon Brown, former Prime Minister of the United Kingdom. Despite being on the political left-wing of the party, he was considered Brown's right-hand man and protégé (Brown was one of Tony Blair's key partners during the New Labour era). He stood in the 2011 Scottish Parliament election as a Labour candidate for Dunfermline.

=== Deputy Leader of the Scottish Labour Party ===
Rowley declared his candidacy for the Scottish Labour Party's 2015 deputy leadership election, and was supported in his candidacy by trade unions ASLEF, CWU, NUM, Scottish Co-Operative Party, Socialist Health Association, TSSA, UCATT, and UNISON. He comfortably won the first round preferences of votes from the labour party membership and secured victory with over half the votes in the second round of voting. He was elected on 15 August 2015. Following Kezia Dugdale's resignation, he took over as acting Leader of the Scottish Labour Party, until the new leader was elected.

In September 2017, a leaked recording that was taken without permission and sold to The Scottish Sun, featuring Rowley at the Labour Party Conference in Brighton, led to accusations of a plot to oust Dugdale and replace her with Richard Leonard. Rowley said he backed Leonard to become leader to a member of the public, as well as party member, in a conversation that turned out to be a freelance journalist secretly recording the conversation undercover. Rowley had stated he would remain neutral, but was unaware of being recorded by what turned out to be a journalist trying to sell a story. He apologised for the leaked recording, but strenuously denied being involved in or even aware of any plots within the Labour Party to remove Dugdale.

=== Shadow Cabinet ===
From October 2018 to September 2019, Rowley served as Scottish Labour Spokesperson for Communities and Local Government. During the 2019 Scottish budget process, Rowley was reprimanded by the Scottish Labour leader due to Rowley's personal discussions with the SNP Finance Secretary about supporting the budget in exchange for cuts to local government being substituted for Higher Education cuts in breach of Scottish Labour Party policy and undermining the budget spokesperson James Kelly.

Rowley became Scottish Labour Spokesperson for Brexit and Constitutional Relations in September 2019. In November 2020, he was moved to the role of shadow economy minister. He nominated Monica Lennon in the 2021 Scottish Labour leadership election. After Anas Sarwar won the leadership election, he promoted Rowley to Shadow Cabinet Secretary for Transport, Infrastructure and Connectivity.

On 6 March 2025, he announced he would stand down at the 2026 Scottish Parliament election.

== Personal life ==
Rowley has three adult children, a granddaughter, and a grandson. He is the father of Danielle Rowley, who served as MP for Midlothian from the 2017 general election until the 2019 general election.

On 15 November 2017, Rowley resigned as deputy leader and referred himself to an internal investigation after a former partner took to the Scottish Sun to accuse him of sending her disrespectful text messages four years previously. Former Scottish Labour leader Kezia Dugdale and leadership candidate Anas Sarwar called for Rowley to be suspended from the party while the investigation was carried out. Rowley claimed there was a determined attempt to use the media to damage him and his family for political purposes. The investigation concluded there was no case to answer as the party had not received a formal complaint. A party spokesperson added: "The party was approached by newspapers with unsubstantiated claims, with no evidence shared with the Labour party prior to publication in the Sun newspaper."

Party political offices
Preceded by Jack McConnell	General Secretary of Scottish Labour; 1998–1999	Succeeded by Lesley Quinn
Preceded by Kezia Dugdale	Deputy Leader of Scottish Labour; 2015–2017	Succeeded by Lesley Laird (interim)
Preceded by Kezia Dugdale	Leader of Scottish Labour; Acting; 2017	Succeeded by Richard Leonard
