= Cathy Jamieson =

Scottish politician (born 1956)

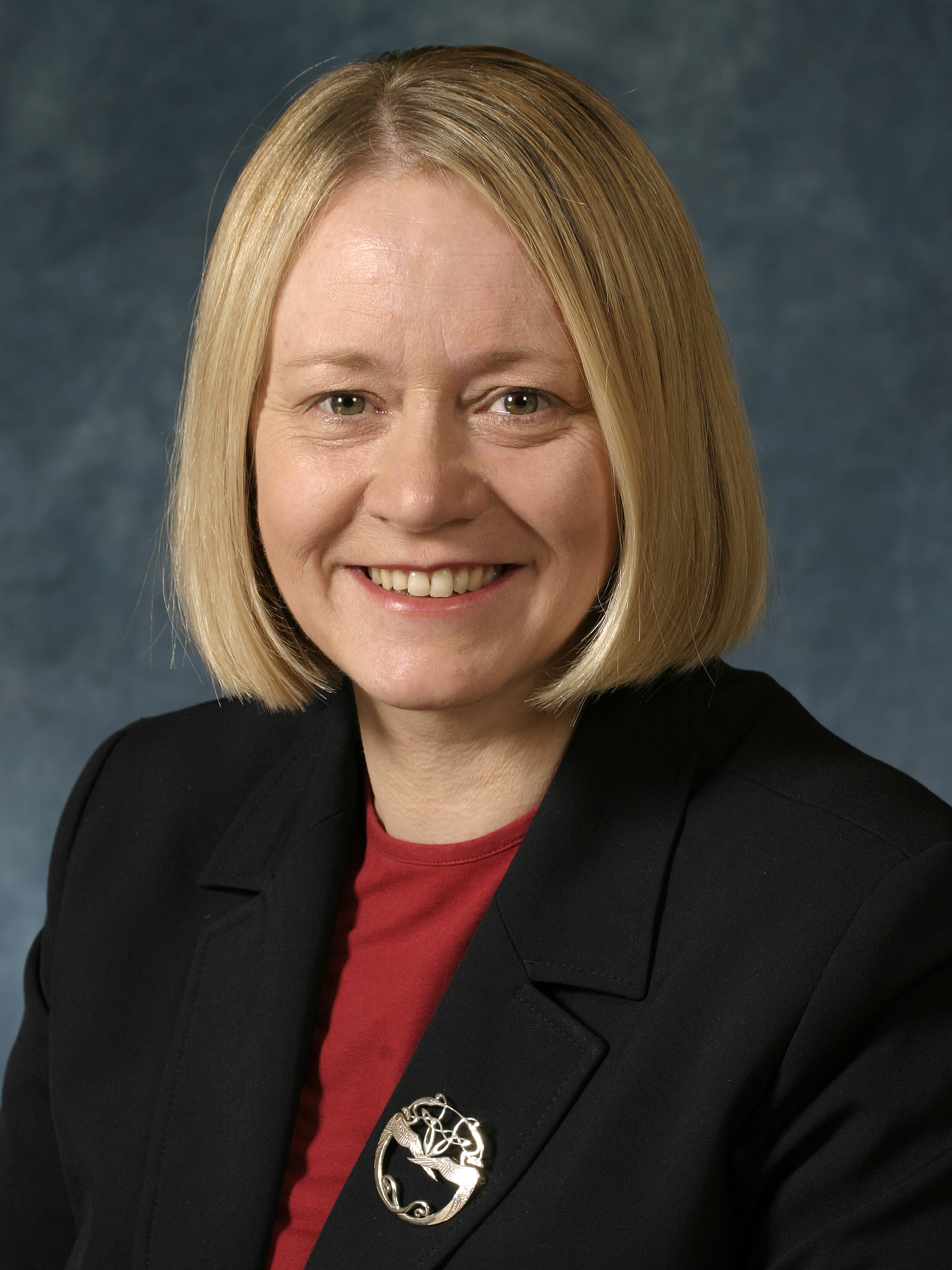
- Official portrait, 2003

Leader of the Labour Party in the Scottish Parliament (Note: The party was known as Leader of the Labour Party in the Scottish Parliament until the 2011 Murphy and Boyack review, when the party changed to Scottish Labour.)
- Acting; 28 June 2008 – 13 September 2008
- UK party leader: Gordon Brown
- Preceded by: Wendy Alexander
- Succeeded by: Iain Gray
- Acting; 15 August 2007 – 14 September 2007
- UK party leader: Gordon Brown
- Preceded by: Jack McConnell
- Succeeded by: Wendy Alexander
- Acting; 8 November 2001 – 22 November 2001
- UK party leader: Tony Blair
- Preceded by: Henry McLeish
- Succeeded by: Jack McConnell

Deputy Leader of the Labour Party in Scotland
- In office 21 October 2000 – 28 June 2008
- Leader: Henry McLeish; Jack McConnell; Wendy Alexander
- Preceded by: Position established
- Succeeded by: Johann Lamont
Ministerial offices
Minister for Justice
In office 21 May 2003 – 17 May 2007
First Minister	Jack McConnell
Preceded by	Jim Wallace
Succeeded by	Kenny MacAskill
Minister for Education and Young People
In office 22 November 2001 – 20 May 2003
First Minister	Jack McConnell
Preceded by	Jack McConnell
Succeeded by	Peter Peacock
Further offices held
Shadow Economic Secretary to the Treasury
In office 8 October 2011 – 8 May 2015
Leader	Ed Miliband
Preceded by	David Hanson
Succeeded by	Richard Burgon
Parliamentary Business Manager of the Scottish Labour Party
In office 18 May 2007 – 18 September 2007
Leader	Jack McConnell; Herself (acting)
Preceded by	Office established
Succeeded by	Paul Martin
Member of Parliament for Kilmarnock and Loudoun
In office 6 May 2010 – 30 March 2015
Preceded by	Des Browne
Succeeded by	Alan Brown
Member of the Scottish Parliament for Carrick, Cumnock and Doon Valley
In office 6 May 1999 – 22 March 2011
Preceded by	Constituency established
Succeeded by	Adam Ingram

Personal details
- Born: Catherine Mary Jamieson; 3 November 1956 (age 69) Kilmarnock, Ayrshire, Scotland
- Party: Scottish Labour and Co-operative Party
- Education: Glasgow School of Art; Goldsmiths College; University of Glasgow; Glasgow Caledonian University
- Website: www.cathyjamieson.com

Catherine Mary Jamieson (born 3 November 1956) is a Scottish business director, currently a director at Kilmarnock Football Club and former politician. She served as the Deputy Leader of the Labour Party in Scotland from 2000 to 2008. She previously served in the Scottish Executive as Minister for Justice from 2003 to 2007 and Minister for Education and Young People from 2001 to 2003. Jamieson was Member of the Scottish Parliament (MSP) for Carrick, Cumnock and Doon Valley from 1999 to 2011 and was a Member of Parliament (MP) for Kilmarnock and Loudoun from 2010 to 2015.

Born in Kilmarnock, Jamieson was educated at James Hamilton Academy and later studied Fine Art at the Glasgow School of Art, before gaining a Higher National Diploma in Art at Goldsmiths College in London. She trained as an art therapist, but decided to take a career in social work. In 1983, Jamieson gained a Certificate of Qualification in Social Work from the University of Glasgow. After graduating, she worked in various posts within the Strathclyde Regional Council and worked for Who Cares? Scotland from 1992 to 1999. Jamieson stood as a Labour candidate in the 1999 election to the 1st Scottish Parliament. After a successful campaign, she was elected to represent the Carrick, Cumnock and Doon Valley constituency. As a backbencher, Jamieson various Scottish Parliament committees and was the deputy convenor of the European Committee. Following the death of Donald Dewar, Henry McLeish was elected Leader of the Labour Party in Scotland and Jamieson was elected unopposed as his deputy leader, the first officeholder. In the aftermath of McLeish's resignation, she served as the acting Leader until Jack McConnell was elected as the new Labour leader.

Following McConnell's appointment as First Minister of Scotland in 2001, Jamieson was appointed to the Scottish Cabinet to serve as the Minister for Education and Young People. As the Education Minister, she conducted a reform of the Scottish Qualifications Authority and successfully passed the Protection from Abuse (Scotland) Act 2001 through the parliament, which sought to set up a list of people unsuitable to work with children, maintained by Disclosure Scotland. In the 2003 Scottish Parliament election, Jamieson was re-elected and was appointed the Minister for Justice in McConnell's second cabinet reshuffle. As the Justice Minister, she took a leading role on anti-social behaviour, tackling violence and sectarianism and commissioned a major review of Scotland's Civil Justice system. Jamieson made attempts to ban Buckfast, a popular drink among underage drinkers, however, she was unsuccessful as the company threatened to take legal action against the Scottish Executive. In early 2005, it was revealed her nephew, Derek Hyslop, tried to blackmail her. In 1999, Jamieson sent £100 to Hyslop following the birth of his son, but he claimed it was sent to help him evade the police while he was on the run.

At the 2007 Scottish Parliament election, the Scottish Labour Party were defeated by the Scottish National Party (SNP), by just a single seat; ending eight years of Labour-Lib Dem devolved governance in Scotland. McConnell announced his resignation as the Leader of Scottish Labour and Jamieson served as acting leader until Wendy Alexander was elected. Jamieson continued to serve as the Deputy Leader until she resigned in June 2008 to stand for election as the Leader of the Labour Party in Scotland following Alexander's resignation. She came second, having been defeated by Iain Gray. Jamieson was appointed by Gray as Shadow Cabinet Secretary for Health and Wellbeing. Jamieson stood down as an MSP in the 2011 election and ran as a candidate at the 2010 UK general election. She was elected to the House of Commons, representing the Kilmarnock and Loudoun constituency. Under Ed Miliband, Jamieson was appointed in 2011 as the Shadow Economic Secretary to the Treasury within the Official Opposition frontbench. At the 2015 general election, she was defeated by the SNP candidate Alan Brown, at what was a landslide defeat for Scottish Labour after 51 years of domination of Scottish politics at Westminster.

Since leaving Parliament, Jamieson became CEO of CareVisions Ltd. In May 2018, she was appointed to the Kilmarnock Football Club board of directors.

== Early life ==
Catherine Mary Jamieson was born on 3 November 1956 in Kilmarnock, East Ayrshire. Jamieson was educated at James Hamilton Academy, before obtaining a BA (Hons) in Fine Art at the Glasgow School of Art and a Higher National Diploma in Art at Goldsmiths College in London. She gained a Management qualification from the Glasgow Caledonian University and later a post graduate Certificate of Qualification in social work from the University of Glasgow.

After training as an art therapist, Jamieson turned to social work, becoming principal officer of an advocacy organisation for young people in care. She was also a member of the Edinburgh inquiry into abuse in residential care and served on the management and advisory committees of several childcare agencies.

== Election to Holyrood ==
Jamieson was elected an MSP in the first 1999 Scottish Parliament election. She was elected Deputy Leader of the Scottish Labour Party in 2000 in leadership elections following the death of First Minister, Donald Dewar. The position of Deputy Leader was a first for the Scottish party, and Jamieson was elected unopposed.

== Labour in government: 2001–2007 ==
=== Minister for Education and Young People: 2001–2003 ===
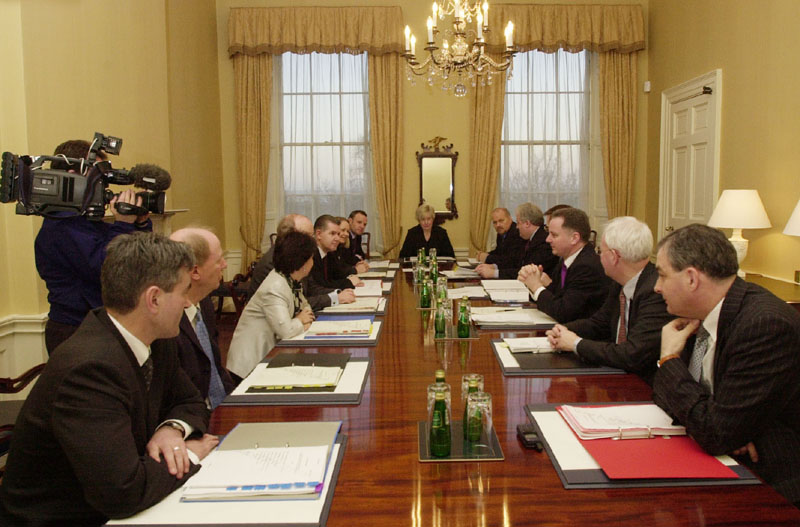
Jamieson was appointed Minister for Education and Young People in the First McConnell government in 2001

In 2001, Jack McConnell became First Minister and Jamieson was appointed Minister for Education and Young People in the subsequent cabinet reshuffle. She successfully shepherded the Protection from Abuse (Scotland) Act 2001 through parliament – legislation which set up a list of people unsuitable to work with children, to be maintained by Disclosure Scotland.

During her tenure as education minister, Jamieson reformed the Scottish Qualifications Authority to reduce bureaucracy, and commenced the largest school building programme seen in Scotland. During the UK-wide fire strike in 2002, Jamieson was criticised for refusing to publicly endorse the Executive's collectively agreed description of the fire strike as "unacceptable", and opposition MSPs called for her to be sacked. However, the First Minister issued a statement of public support for Jamieson and took no action.

=== Minister for Justice: 2003–2007 ===
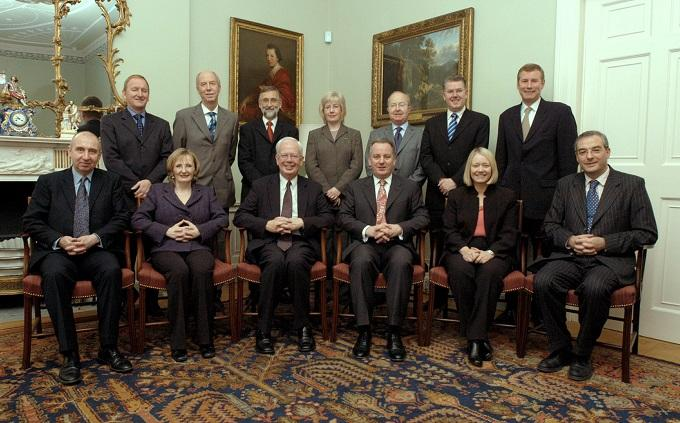
Jamieson (second from right) with the Second McConnell government, where she served as Minister for Justice

Jamieson was appointed Minister for Justice following the 2003 Scottish Parliament election. During her tenure, in addition to taking a substantial justice legislative programme through parliament (14 bills including reform of courts, protections for vulnerable witnesses, measures on the management of offenders, policing, family law, legal aid, the legal profession and the establishment of the Scottish Commission on Human Rights) she took a leading role on anti-social behaviour, tackling violence and sectarianism and commissioned a major review of Scotland's Civil Justice system.

In February 2005, it was revealed that Jamieson's nephew, Derek Hyslop, tried to blackmail her in 2001 while she was Education Minister. Hyslop was serving a jail sentence for manslaughter, and sent her a Christmas card demanding money, threatening to reveal his criminal convictions if she did not pay him. Jamieson had paid £100 into his bank account in 1999, following the birth of his son, and Hyslop tried to claim that she made the payment to help him evade the police while he was on the run.

One of the major crises to face Jamieson during her time as Minister for Justice, was the scandals occurring after the transfer of prisoner escort duties from the police to a private company, Reliance Security Group. Four days following the transfer, Reliance accidentally released a convicted killer at Hamilton Sheriff Court. Jamieson later criticised Reliance and their security methods, but defended the principle of using a private company to transfer prisoners. Opposition parties later called for her to resign, calls that Jamieson rejected, stating "I think the responsibility on a minister is to ensure that problems are solved... Some people in the face of problems might turn away, might walk away from them. I have no intention of doing that and I never did."

One of the more high-profile campaigns launched by Jamieson was a campaign to ban Buckfast, a tonic wine popular with some underage drinkers in parts of Scotland. She campaigned against shops in her Carrick, Cumnock and Doon Valley constituency to limit sales of the drink, claiming it was "linked to anti-social behaviour among young people". The distributors of Buckfast later threatened legal action against the Minister, stating it was harming sales, although the reported effect was that Buckfast sales had actually increased substantially in the months following her comments. On a subsequent visit to Auchinleck, a town within her constituency, she faced an impromptu demonstration by teenagers chanting "Don't ban Buckie". In 2005, she co-introduced the joint Scottish Executive and Home Office consultation on criminalising possession of "extreme pornography", which claimed the intention "to reduce the demand for such material and to send a clear message that it has no place in our society". She referred to such material as "abhorrent". The plans have been opposed by groups such as the umbrella group Backlash.

=== Out of power: 2007 ===
Following the Scottish National Party (SNP) victory at the 2007 Scottish Parliament election, Jamieson was appointed Shadow Minister for Parliamentary Business and was selected as Labour's appointment to the Parliamentary Bureau.

After Jack McConnell's resignation as Scottish Labour Leader on 15 August, Jamieson was acting leader until 14 September 2007, when Wendy Alexander took over the leadership who appointed Jamieson as her deputy but without a portfolio spokesperson's role.

== 2008 Scottish Labour Party leadership election ==
On 29 July 2008, Jamieson announced her intention to stand for the Scottish Labour leadership. After the contest with candidates Iain Gray and Andy Kerr, Jamieson came second to Gray during the election night on 13 September 2008. On 16 September, Gray announced the appointment of Jamieson as Shadow Cabinet Secretary for Health and Wellbeing.

== MP for Kilmarnock and Loudoun: 2010–2015 ==
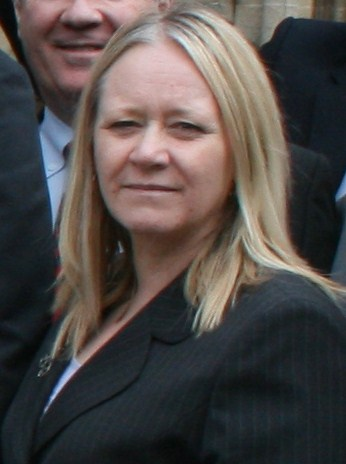
Jamieson in 2011 during her tenure as MP for Kilmarnock and Loudoun

=== Election to parliament ===
Jamieson was elected MP for Kilmarnock and Loudoun in the 2010 general election, after winning with a majority of 12,378 and 52.5% of the vote. An opponent of the Trident nuclear weapons system, Jamieson became secretary of the Westminster Parliamentary CND group. Following her election to the House of Commons, she did not seek re-election for her Scottish Parliament seat in the 2011 election.

=== Johnnie Walker closure ===
Before the 2010 election, Jamieson had faced the announcement from Diageo in 2009 to pull historic links with Kilmarnock, announcing they would be moving the Johnnie Walker company to Fife, ending the 189-year link the brand had with the town. She strongly criticised Alex Salmond's SNP government and its candidate for Kilmarnock and Loudoun after they announced no money would be coming from the SNP to help create new jobs in Kilmarnock. She said the announcement was a "huge blow for the local area" and worked with a local taskforce to put pressure on the SNP.

=== Shadow Economic Secretary to the Treasury ===
Under Ed Miliband, Jamieson was appointed in 2011 as the Shadow Economic Secretary to the Treasury within the Official Opposition frontbench. On being appointed, Jamieson said:

I am pleased to be joining the Shadow Treasury team. Every day we hear more about how people across the country are facing rising costs of living, and the fear of unemployment. We know that the Tory-led Government is cutting too far and too fast, and while their plan is hurting, it simply isn't working. Labour believes there is a better way to deal with the economy, and we've launched our 5 point plan for jobs and growth.

In March 2012, two years after Jamieson became MP, the Johnnie Walker factory in Kilmarnock closed, resulting in the loss of more than 700 jobs. Jamieson described it as an "end of an era in Kilmarnock" and pledged to put pressure on Diageo to honour commitments for the "iconic" site to become a point of regrowth in Kilmarnock.

=== Defeat ===
At the 2015 general election, Kilmarnock and Loudoun was gained by SNP candidate Alan Brown with a majority of 13,638 and 55.7% of the vote, an increase of 29.7%.

== After politics ==
Since leaving public office, Jamieson has been appointed as the CEO of Care Vision Children's Services. She has since committed much of her time to social work, with Care Vision providing residential and foster placements for vulnerable children and young people in Scotland.

Jamieson joined the board of directors at Kilmarnock Football Club as a director following the Kilmarnock Supporters Society Ltd (The Killie Trust) reaching their £100,000 funding target through the Trust in Killie initiative. This funding allowed Jamieson to take up the position of director on the board of management. Jamieson herself is a lifelong fan of the club.

== Personal life ==
Jamieson currently lives in Mauchline with her husband, Ian Sharpe. She has one son and has been a vegan since 1996. After losing her seat, she became CEO of CareVisions Ltd, a residential child care company in Scotland originating in Dumfries and Galloway. In May 2018, she was appointed to the Kilmarnock Football Club board of directors.

== See also ==
- Scottish Labour Party
- Kilmarnock and Loudoun (UK Parliament constituency)

== Notes ==
Scottish Parliament
New parliament Scotland Act 1998	Member of the Scottish Parliament for Carrick, Cumnock & Doon Valley; 1999–2011	Succeeded by Adam Ingram
Parliament of the United Kingdom
Preceded by Des Browne	Member of Parliament for Kilmarnock & Loudoun; 2010–2015	Succeeded by Alan Brown
Political offices
Preceded by Jim Wallace	Minister for Justice; 2003–2007	Succeeded by Kenny MacAskill as Cabinet Secretary for Justice
Preceded by Jack McConnell	Minister for Education and Young People; 2002–2003	Succeeded by Peter Peacock
