= 2020 Scottish Labour deputy leadership election =

- 21 February – 3 April 2020
- Turnout: 50.6%
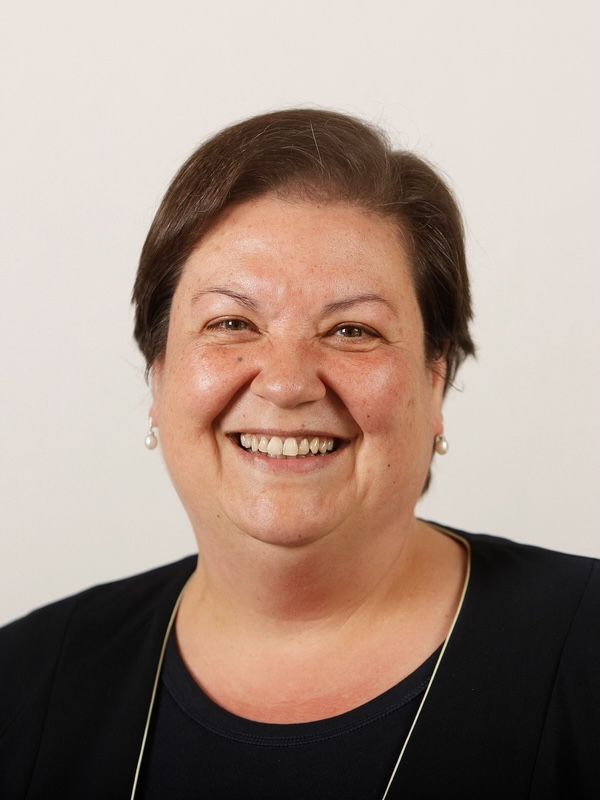

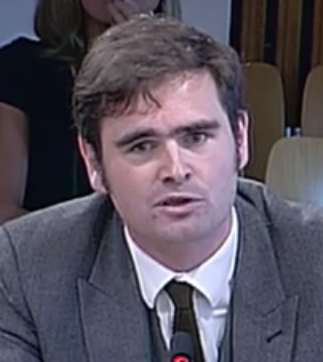
Candidate	Jackie Baillie	Matt Kerr
Popular vote	10,311	7,528
Percentage	57.8	42.19
MP/MSP/Cllr Nominations	60	33
Deputy Leader before election
Lesley Laird
Elected Deputy Leader
Jackie Baillie

The 2020 Scottish Labour deputy leadership election was triggered on 16 December 2019 following the defeat of Lesley Laird as MP for Kirkcaldy and Cowdenbeath in the 2019 general election. The result of the Deputy Leadership Election was announced on Twitter on 3 April 2020.

== Background ==
The 2019 general election saw the Scottish National Party (SNP) regain 13 of the 21 seats they lost in 2017. One of those won was Kirkcaldy and Cowdenbeath, the seat of Scottish Labour Deputy Leader and Shadow Scottish Secretary, Lesley Laird. Despite the seat being a gain for the SNP, the new MP, Neale Hanvey sat as an independent until May 2020 due to an investigation into antisemitic posts online.

== Procedure ==
As with the previous leadership election, the election was held under one-person-one-vote from an electorate of members, affiliated supporters and registered supporters.

Leadership candidates needed to be an MP, MSP or MEP, and need the support of at least 15%, or five, of the thirty-two Scottish Labour MPs, MSPs. They will also need nominations from 5% of local parties or three affiliates, including two trade unions, comprising 5% of affiliated membership, to get on the ballot paper.

=== Timetable ===
13 January	Nominations open
14 January	Registered supporters applications open
16 January	Registered supporters applications close
19 January	Nominations closed
20 January	Opening of CLP and affiliate nominations. Scottish Labour Party hustings period open. Freeze date for membership and supporter eligibility at 5PM
3 February	Last day for affiliates to send over new and updated affiliated supporter lists
14 February	Close of CLP and affiliate nominations and last day for membership to be in full compliance (including full payment of arrears).
21 February	Voting opens
27 February	Last date for postal ballot reissues
30 March	Last date for email ballot reissues
2 April	Ballot closes (12PM)
3 April	Announcement of results

== Campaign ==
Initially Jackie Baillie and fellow MSP Pauline McNeill were planning to run on a platform of job-sharing the role. However, it was found that this would not be possible due to the party's constitution. Pauline McNeill and Baillie subsequently stood separately in the election.

Following the close of nominations on 19 January, Dundee Councillor Michael Marra did not receive sufficient nominations to advance to the next round of the campaign. The same day, McNeill announced that she would also withdraw from the contest, leaving a two way campaign between Baillie and Matt Kerr.

Kerr has been described as left-wing, having strong ties with the trade union movement, and being a supporter of Jeremy Corbyn. Kerr supports the devolution of trade union and employment law, inclusive Constituency Labour Parties (CLP's) that are rooted in communities, open selections, and the creation of an accredited political academy to help develop new political talent.

== Candidates ==
Candidate	Political roles	Nominations from MSPs, MPs and Cllrs	Supporting nominations from Constituency Labour Parties	Supporting nominations from affiliated Trade Unions, Groups and Socialist Societies	Endorsements
Jackie Baillie	MSP for Dumbarton (since 1999)	60 Nominations MSPs (11): Jackie Baillie; Claire Baker; Neil Bibby; Iain Gray; Mark Griffin; Daniel Johnson; James Kelly; Lewis Macdonald; Anas Sarwar; Colin Smyth; David Stewart; Scottish MPs (1): Ian Murray; Councillors (48): Cllr Saqib Ahmed; Cllr Shamin Akhtar; Cllr Scott Arthur; Cllr Derek Bibby; Cllr Jim Blackwood; Cllr Olivia Carson; Cllr Tom Conn; Cllr Carolann Davidson; Cllr Cammy Day; Cllr Gerry Dorrian; Cllr Barry Douglas; Cllr Alison Dowling; Cllr Archie Dryburgh; Cllr Joe Fagan; Cllr Lawrence Fitzpatrick; Cllr Jim Fletcher; Cllr Alex Gallagher; Cllr Mary Gourlay; Cllr Allan Graham; Cllr Joan Griffiths; Cllr Rashid Hussain; Cllr Jean Jones; Cllr Kevin Keenan; Cllr Paul Kelly; Cllr Stewart MacDonald; Cllr Hanzala Malik; Cllr Sean Marshall; Cllr John Martin; Cllr Monique McAdams; Cllr Douglas McAllister; Cllr David McBride; Cllr Frank McNally; Cllr Heather McVey; Cllr John Millar; Cllr Kevin Montgomery; Cllr Elaine Murray; Cllr Paul O'Kane; Cllr Claire Quigley; Cllr Hanif Raja; Cllr Mo Razzaq; Cllr Louise Roarty; Cllr Martin Rooney; Cllr James Scanlon; Cllr Graham Scott; Cllr David Stitt; Cllr Kirsteen Sullivan; Cllr Bert Thomson; Cllr Adam Wilson	40 Nominations Constituency Labour Parties (CLPs): Aberdeen Central CLP; Aberdeen Donside CLP; Aberdeen South & North Kincardine CLP; Aberdeenshire West CLP; Airdrie & Shotts CLP; Angus South CLP; Argyll and Bute CLP; Cumbernauld & Kilsyth CLP; Cunninghame North CLP; Dumbarton CLP; Dunfermline CLP; Dumfriesshire CLP; East Kilbride CLP; East Lothian CLP; Eastwood CLP; Edinburgh East CLP; Edinburgh Pentlands CLP; Edinburgh Southern CLP; Galloway & West Dumfries CLP; Glasgow Anniesland CLP; Glasgow Cathcart CLP; Glasgow Pollok; Glasgow Provan CLP; Glasgow Shettleston CLP; Glasgow Southside CLP; Greenock & Inverclyde CLP; Hamilton, Larkhall & Stonehouse CLP; Inverness, Nairn & Strathspey CLP; Linlithgow CLP; Midlothian South, Tweeddale and Lauderdale CLP; Moray CLP; Motherwell & Wishaw CLP; Na h-Eileanan an lar CLP; Paisley CLP; Renfrewshire North & West CLP; Renfrewshire South CLP; Rutherglen CLP; Skye, Lochaber & Badenoch CLP; Stirling CLP; Strathkelvin & Bearsden CLP	8 Nominations: BAME Labour; Christians on the Left; Community; GMB; Jewish Labour Movement; National Union of Mineworkers (NUM); Scottish Co-operative Party; Union of Shop, Distributive and Allied Workers (Usdaw)	Endorsements
Matt Kerr	Councillor for Cardonald (previously Craigton) (since 2007)	33 Nominations MSPs (1) Neil Findlay Councillors (32): Cllr John Bell; Cllr Robert Bissett; Cllr Philip Braat; Cllr Bill Butler; Cllr Harry Cartmill; Cllr Gail Casey; Cllr Dave Clark; Cllr Joe Cullinane; Cllr Eddie Devine; Cllr David Dodds; Cllr Willie Doolan; Cllr Angela Feeney; Cllr Robert Foster; Cllr Marie Garrity; Cllr Gary Haldane; Cllr Ricky Henderson; Cllr John Hood; Cllr Colin Jackson; Cllr Matt Kerr; Cllr Martin Lennon; Cllr Neil McGhee; Cllr John McGhee; Cllr Andrew McGuire; Cllr Dominic McGuire; Cllr Louise McPhater; Cllr Jim Montgomerie; Cllr Gordon Munro; Cllr Jim Reddin; Cllr Donald Reid; Cllr Jim Sheridan; Cllr Bill Shields; Cllr John Sweeney	26 Nominations Constituency Labour Parties (CLPs): Almond Valley CLP; Angus North and Mearns CLP; Ayr CLP; Caithness, Sutherland & Ross CLP; Carrick, Cumnock & Doon Valley CLP; Clackmannanshire CLP; Clydebank & Milngavie CLP; Coatbridge & Chryston CLP; Cowdenbeath CLP; Cunninghame South CLP; Dundee East CLP; Dundee West CLP; Edinburgh Central CLP; Edinburgh Northern & Leith CLP; Edinburgh Western CLP; Ettrick, Roxburgh & Berwickshire CLP; Falkirk West CLP; Glasgow Kelvin CLP; Glasgow Maryhill & Springburn CLP; Kirkcaldy CLP; Mid Fife & Glenrothes CLP; Midlothian North & Musselburgh CLP; North East Fife CLP; Orkney CLP; Perth & Kinross CLP; Uddingston & Bellshill CLP	8 Nominations Groups (3): Scottish Labour Students; Socialist Educational Association (Scotland branch); Socialist Health Association (Scotland branch); Trade Unions (5): Associated Society of Locomotive Engineers and Firemen (ASLEF); Communication Workers Union (CWU); Transport Salaried Staffs' Association (TSSA); Unison; Unite the Union	Endorsements Individuals: Joe Cullinane; Maria Fyfe

^{†} CLPs not nominating any candidate:

The following seven constituencies remain unaccounted for:

== Results ==
Candidate	Party members		Registered supporters		Affiliated supporters		Total	
Candidate	Votes	%	Votes	%	Votes	%	Votes	%
Jackie Baillie	7,735	58.9%	323	77.6%	2,253	52.5%	10,311	57.8%
Matt Kerr	5,398	41.1%	93	22.4%	2,037	47.5%	7,528	42.2%
