= 2026 Scottish Labour leadership election =

- 3 August – 19 September 2026
- Turnout: 49.43% (▲6.99pp)
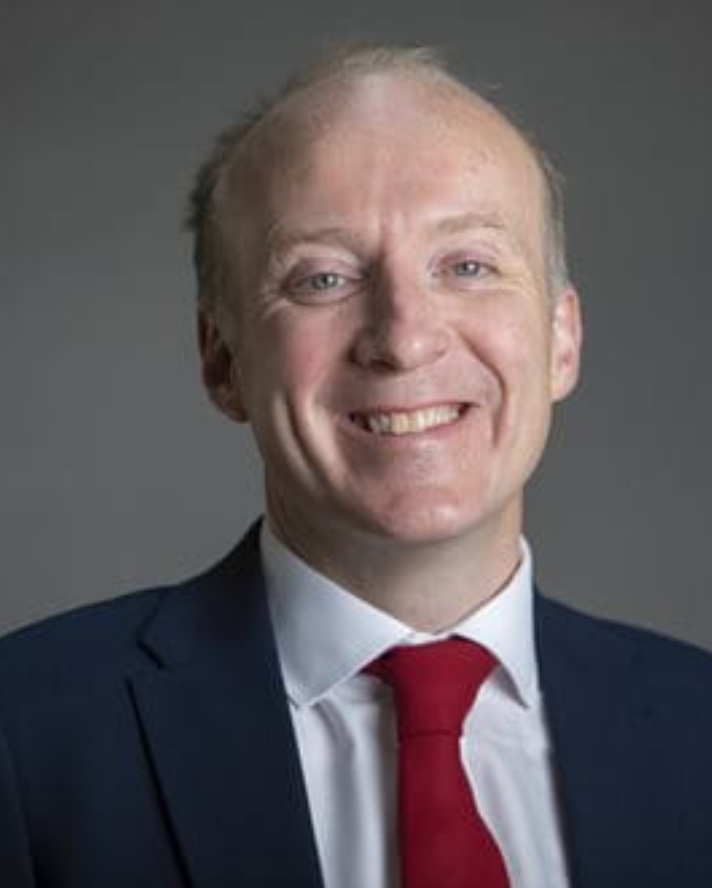

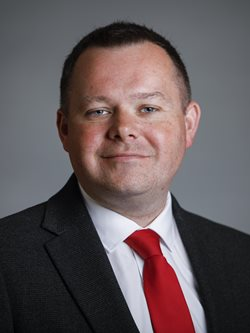
Candidate	Michael Marra	Joe Fagan
Votes	4,266	2,485
Percentage	63.19%	36.81%
Leader before election
Jackie Baillie (acting)
Anas Sarwar
Elected Leader
Michael Marra

The 2026 Scottish Labour leadership election was triggered on 22 July 2026 by the resignation of Anas Sarwar as leader of the Scottish Labour Party, who had led the party since 2021. The results were announced on 19 September, showing Michael Marra had won with 63.19% of the vote, thus becoming the leader of the Scottish Labour Party. 6,751 votes were cast in total by a combination of party members and affiliates.

== Background ==
Anas Sarwar was elected as the leader of the Scottish Labour Party in 2021, replacing Richard Leonard, when he defeated Monica Lennon to win with 57.6% of the vote. The party lost two seats at the 2021 Scottish Parliament election, with Sarwar continuing as party leader. At the 2024 United Kingdom general election, Labour won with a landslide victory, winning 411 seats across the United Kingdom, with Scottish Labour winning 37 of the 57 Scottish seats. Sarwar led his party into the 2026 Scottish Parliament election, which began with him publicly calling for UK Labour leader and Prime Minister Keir Starmer to resign. At the election on 7 May, Sarwar was defeated in Glasgow Cathcart and Pollok by the Scottish National Party, but was subsequently re-elected as a Glasgow regional list MSP. In total, Scottish Labour won 17 seats in the election, 4 fewer than in 2021, leaving them 41 seats behind the SNP.

Prior to the election, Sarwar ruled out accepting a seat in the House of Lords if Labour lost, and after the results said he intended to continue serving as leader. He resigned two months later to take up a role as trade minister in the Burnham ministry, receiving a life peerage to do so.

In May 2027, all 32 Scottish local authorities will be up for election. The next United Kingdom general election will take place in or before 2029, and the next Scottish Parliament election will take place in or before 2031.

== Campaign ==
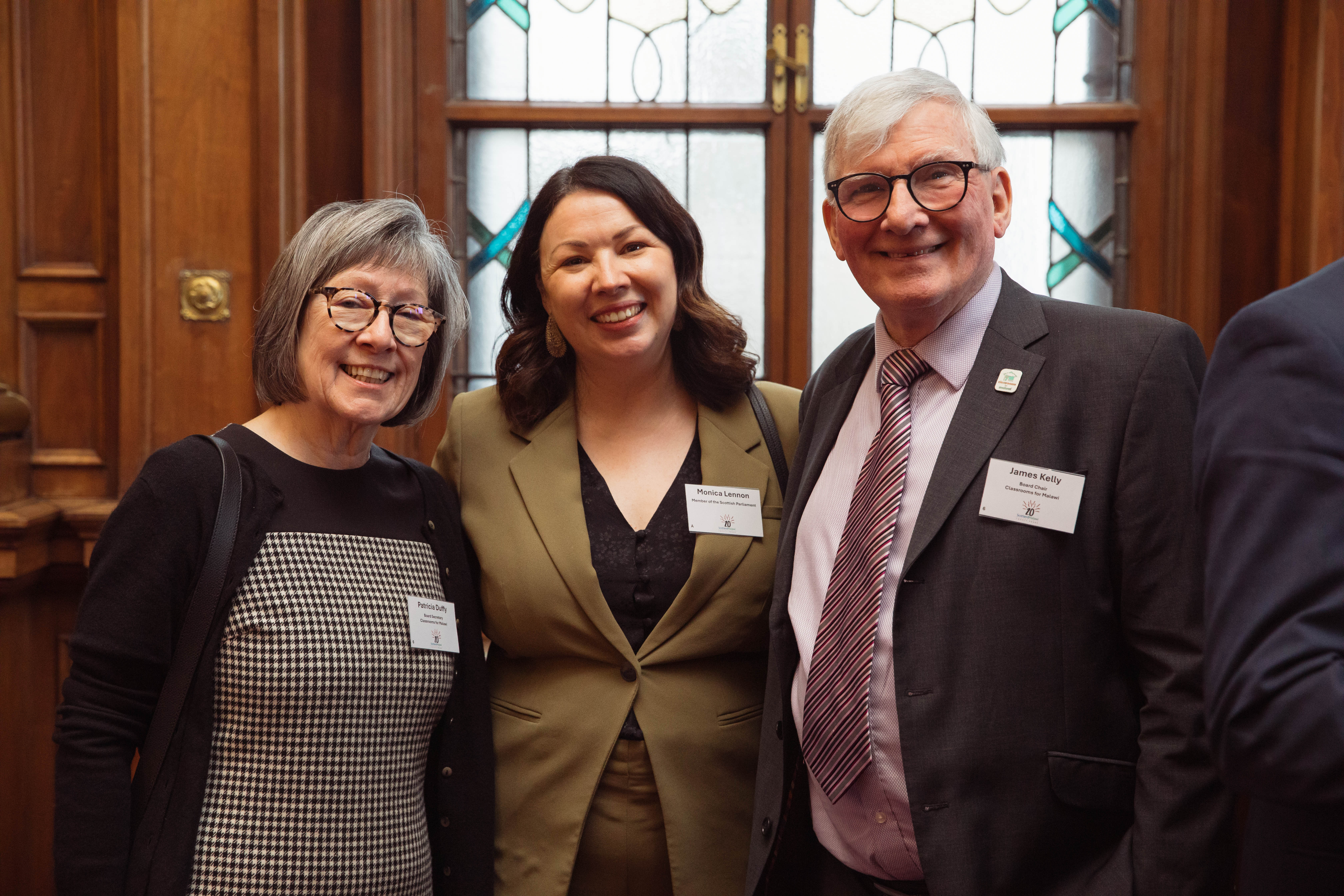
Monica Lennon (centre) at Scotland Malawi Partnership 20th anniversary in Edinburgh

Monica Lennon, who lost her seat as an MSP in 2026, but is returning to parliament due to Sarwar's resignation, announced her leadership bid on 26 July. Lennon lost the 2021 leadership election to outgoing leader Anas Sarwar. Shadow Finance Secretary, Michael Marra, announced his candidacy the following day, on 27 July. Joe Fagan, elected MSP for the first time in 2026, entered the race on 28 July.

Paul Sweeney, also on the soft-left of the party, considered standing but later decided instead to back Joe Fagan's campaign. Katy Clark, on the left of the party, is reported to have been canvassing for support from MPs and MSPs.

Lennon had previously suggested in 2020 that Scottish Labour should split from the UK party. More recently in June 2026, she said a split should "not be ruled out". After announcing her bid in July, she backed down from a formal split from UK Labour.

Both Marra and Fagan have been sceptical about attempts by the Scottish Parliament to make it easier for people to change their legally recognised sex. Lennon accused the party of having "a problem when it comes to trans people", saying it should instead be showing compassion and respect to trans people.

Marra and Fagan both support extracting oil and gas from the Rosebank and Jackdaw fields. Fagan has promised that he "will not stop lobbying" the UK government to approve the controversial oil and gas fields.

== Procedure ==
On 27 July, the Scottish Executive Committee announced the election procedure. It was announced that the election would take six weeks, and prospective candidates would require nominations from at least:

- 3 Scottish Labour MPs;
- 3 Scottish Labour MSPs;
- 3 Scottish Labour affiliates or CLPs (at least 2 of which must be trade union affiliates).

Candidates who receive the requisite nominations will face a ballot of (~11,000) Scottish Labour members and members of affiliate organisations.

=== Election timetable ===
Date	Event
3 August	MP and MSP nominations open
17 August	MP and MSP nominations close
17 August	Affiliate nominations open
24 August	Affiliate nominations close
28 August	Ballot opens
17 September	Ballot closes
19 September	Result announced

== Candidates ==
=== Nominated ===
Candidate	Born	Political office	Announced
Joe Fagan	1987; Lanarkshire, Scotland	MSP for South Scotland (2026–); Shadow Minister for Public Finance and Local Government (2026–); Leader, South Lanarkshire Council (2022–2026)	28 July 2026
Michael Marra	1979; Dundee, Scotland	MSP for North East Scotland (2021–); Shadow Finance Secretary (2023–); Shadow Education and Skills Secretary (2021–2023)	27 July 2026

=== Eliminated ===
The following did not qualify to enter after failing to reach the required nominations:

Candidate	Born	Political office	Announced	Eliminated
Monica Lennon	7 January 1981; Bellshill, Scotland	MSP for Glasgow (2026–); MSP for Central Scotland (2016–2026); Shadow Net Zero, Energy and Transport Secretary (2021); Shadow Health Secretary (2018–2021)	26 July 2026	17 August 2026

=== Declined to run ===
- Jackie Baillie, MSP for Dumbarton (since 1999), Scottish Labour Deputy leader
- Katy Clark, MSP for West of Scotland (since 2021), Deputy Presiding Officer of the Scottish Parliament (nominated Lennon)
- Daniel Johnson, MSP for Edinburgh Southern (since 2016), Shadow Transport Secretary (nominated Marra)
- Carol Mochan, MSP for South Scotland (since 2021), Shadow Equalities and International Development Minister (nominated Lennon)
- Paul Sweeney, MSP for Glasgow (since 2021), former MP for Glasgow North East (nominated Fagan)

== Nominations ==
The first round of nominations, from MPs, MSPs, affiliates, and CLPs, opened on 3 August 2026. Nominations close on 17 August 2026.

Candidate	MPs		MSPs		Affiliates and CLPs	
Candidate	Nominations 3 needed to stand	%	Nominations 3 needed to stand	%	Nominations 3 needed to stand, including 2 unions	%
Joe Fagan	7 / 37	19%	5 / 17	29%	12 / 96	13%
Monica Lennon	2 / 37	5%	3 / 17	18%	10 / 96	10%
Michael Marra	24 / 37	65%	8 / 17	47%	18 / 96	19%

=== Joe Fagan ===
==== MPs ====
1. Frank McNally
2. Katrina Murray
3. Pamela Nash
4. Joani Reid
5. Martin Rhodes
6. Alison Taylor
7. Imogen Walker

==== MSPs ====
1. himself
2. Irshad Ahmed
3. Neil Bibby
4. Donald MacKinnon
5. Paul Sweeney

==== Affiliates and CLPs ====
1. GMB (trade union)
2. USDAW (trade union)
3. Airdrie (CLP)
4. Clydesdale (CLP)
5. Cumbernauld and Kilsyth (CLP)
6. East Kilbride (CLP)
7. Glasgow Baillieston and Shettleston (CLP)
8. Glasgow Central (CLP)
9. Inverness and Nairn (CLP)
10. Moray (CLP)
11. Paisley (CLP)
12. Strathkelvin and Bearsden (CLP)

=== Monica Lennon ===
==== MPs ====
1. Brian Leishman
2. Euan Stainbank

==== MSPs ====
1. herself
2. Katy Clark
3. Carol Mochan

==== Affiliates and CLPs ====
1. CWU (trade union)
2. TSSA (trade union)
3. Unison (trade union)
4. Unite the Union (trade union)
5. Scottish Co-operative Party
6. SERA Scotland (socialist society)
7. Clackmannanshire and Dunblane (CLP)
8. Falkirk West (CLP)
9. Hamilton, Larkhall and Stonehouse (CLP)
10. Orkney Islands (CLP)

=== Michael Marra ===
==== MPs ====
1. Zubir Ahmed
2. Scott Arthur
3. Richard Baker
4. Johanna Baxter
5. Maureen Burke
6. Irene Campbell
7. Torcuil Crichton
8. Graeme Downie
9. Patricia Ferguson
10. Alan Gemmell
11. Tracy Gilbert
12. John Grady
13. Lillian Jones
14. Chris Kane
15. Martin McCluskey
16. Blair McDougall
17. Gordon McKee
18. Kirsty McNeill
19. Chris Murray
20. Ian Murray
21. Michael Shanks
22. Kenneth Stevenson
23. Elaine Stewart
24. Kirsteen Sullivan

==== MSPs ====
1. himself
2. Claire Baker
3. Mark Griffin
4. Daniel Johnson
5. Joe Long
6. Katherine Sangster
7. Jenny Young
8. Pauline McNeill

==== Affiliates and CLPs ====
1. ASLEF (trade union)
2. Community (trade union)
3. NUM (trade union)
4. Labour Movement for Europe (socialist society)
5. Scottish Labour Students
6. Scottish Young Labour
7. Angus South (CLP)
8. Carrick, Cumnock and Doon Valley (CLP)
9. Dundee City East (CLP)
10. Dundee City West (CLP)
11. Dunfermline (CLP)
12. East Lothian Coast and Lammermuirs (CLP)
13. Edinburgh Northern (CLP)
14. Edinburgh Southern (CLP)
15. Glasgow Cathcart and Pollok (CLP)
16. Glasgow Easterhouse and Springburn (CLP)
17. Glasgow Kelvin and Maryhill (CLP)
18. Perth and Kinross (RLP)

== Other endorsements ==
=== Joe Fagan ===
- Rhoda Grant, former MSP for Highlands and Islands
- Gavin Keatt, councillor for Hamilton South, South Lanarkshire Council.
- Paul Kelly, councillor for Motherwell West, North Lanarkshire Council.
- Ben Williams, councillor for Fochabers Lhanbryde, Moray Council
- Linda Mabon, councillor for Ballochmyle, East Ayrshire Council
- Sandy Keith, councillor for Elgin City North, Moray Council
- Janis McDonald, councillor for Paisley Northwest, Renfrewshire Council
- Susan Kerr, councillor for Avondale and Stonehouse

=== Monica Lennon ===
- Pauline Bryan, Baroness Bryan of Partick, former Scottish Labour Peer.
- Ayeshah Khan, councillor for Motherwell North, North Lanarkshire Council, former Labour candidate for Motherwell and Wishaw.
- Nairn Angus-McDonald, Councillor for Irvine East, North Ayrshire Council.
- Barry Douglas, Councillor for Kilmarnock East and Hurlford, East Ayrshire Council
- Judy Hamilton, Councillor for Kirkcaldy, Fife Council
- Monique Equi, Councillor for East Kilbride, South Lanarkshire
- Geraldine Woods, Councillor for Coatbridge South, North Lanarkshire Council
- Davie McLachlan, Councillor for Hamilton North & East, South Lanarkshire Council
- Louise McLaughlan, Councillor for Irvine West, North Ayrshire
- John Sweeney, Councillor for Stevenston and Saltcoats, North Ayrshire

=== Michael Marra ===
- Paul O'Kane, former MSP for West Scotland (2021–2026).
- Heather Doran, councillor for Monifeith and Sidlaw, Angus Council.
- Deena Tissera, councillor for Hilton/Woodside/Stockethill, Aberdeen City Council.
- Maureen Devlin, councillor for Bothwell and Uddingston, South Lanarkshire Council.
- Ross Grant, councillor for Tillydrone, Seaton and Old Aberdeen, Aberdeen City Council.
- Alison Ann-Dowling, councillor for Houston, Crosslee and Linwood, Renfrewshire Council.
