= Campaign for Socialism =

Political organisation in Scotland

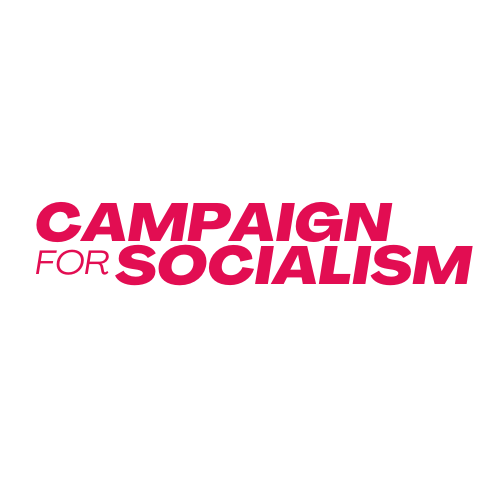
- Abbreviation: CfS
- Secretary: Peter Duffy
- Co-Chair: Mike Cowley; Lauren Harper
- Treasurer: Frieda Park
- Founded: 1994; 32 years ago
- Headquarters: Glasgow
- Newspaper: The Citizen
- Ideology: Democratic socialism
- Political position: Left-wing
- National affiliation: Scottish Labour
- UK affiliate: Momentum
- Endorsed MSPs: 3 / 17
- Endorsed MPs: 1 / 37

Website
- http://www.campaignforsocialism.org.uk/

Campaign for Socialism (CfS) is an autonomous political organisation of Scottish Labour Party members and supporters who campaign for left-wing policies and candidates within the party. In 2016, CfS agreed to a joint membership scheme with Momentum, a UK-wide grassroots movement supportive of Jeremy Corbyn and his leadership of the Labour Party.

== History ==
CfS was originally established in 1994 to campaign against the removal of Clause IV from the Labour Party's constitution. By 2012, it was one of the only remaining ideological-based groupings in the party — but Gerry Hassan and Eric Shaw, writing that year, claimed that CfS "has few members, little organisational presence and has had a negligible influence on the direction of the party".

CfS played a key role in organising Neil Findlay and Katy Clark's leadership bid in the 2014 Scottish Labour leadership election. Though unsuccessful, CfS claims the campaign "built the foundations for Jeremy [Corbyn]'s campaign just a few months later" by "giving many new, young volunteers experience and a network of contacts across the country that would help quickly mobilise an effective campaign".

In 2016, Scottish Labour Young Socialists — founded in 2015 — became CfS's official youth wing.

In 2017, five CfS members won seats on the Scottish Labour Party's national executive. They called for the then Scottish Labour leader, Kezia Dugdale, to pursue a socialist agenda and work more closely with Jeremy Corbyn's team.

CfS endorsed Richard Leonard to be the next leader of Scottish Labour following the resignation of Kezia Dugdale in August 2017. Leonard went on to win the leadership with 56.7% of the vote.

In the 2021 Scottish Labour leadership election the CfS endorsed Monica Lennon to be the next leader of Scottish Labour following Richard Leonard's resignation in January 2021. She lost the election to Anas Sarwar, gaining 42.4% of the vote to his 57.6%.

Notable members of CfS include: former Convenors Elaine Smith MSP and Neil Findlay MSP, former MPs Danielle Rowley and Hugh Gaffney (2017–2019), and Baroness Pauline Bryan.

== Endorsed politicians ==
=== Members of the Scottish Parliament ===
- Katy Clark MSP
- Carol Mochan MSP
- Paul Sweeney MSP

==== Former Member of the Scottish Parliament ====
- Mercedes Villalba, MSP from 6 May 2021 to 9 April 2026

=== Members of the United Kingdom Parliament ===
- Brian Leishman MP
