= Donald MacKinnon (Scottish politician) =

Scottish politician

Donald MacKinnon MSP
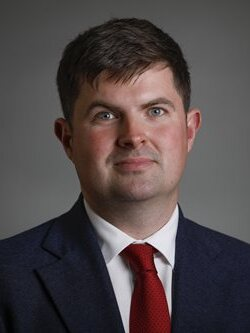
- Official Portrait, 2026

Member of Scottish Parliament for Na h-Eileanan an Iar
- Incumbent
- Assumed office 7 May 2026
- Preceded by: Alasdair Allan
- Majority: 154 (1.2%)

Personal details
- Born: 1995 (age 30–31)
- Party: Scottish Labour

Donald MacKinnon (born 1995) is a Scottish Labour Party politician who has served as Member of the Scottish Parliament (MSP) for Na h-Eileanan an Iar since May 2026.

== Biography ==
MacKinnon is a crofter from the Isle of Lewis. He has worked in agriculture. In 2021, he was appointed chairman of the Scottish Crofting Federation. He is a community development worker. He was a member of the Agricultural Reform Implementation Oversight Board (ARIOB) until his resignation in January 2026.

MacKinnon was a candidate at the 2026 Scottish Parliament election. He was elected MSP for Na h-Eileanan an Iar unseating Alasdair Allan. He won a narrow victory by 154 votes. After the election he was appointed to the Shadow Cabinet by Anas Sarwar and was given the portfolios of agriculture, marine and the islands.

MacKinnon was shortlisted for Speech of the Year in the 2026 Holyrood Awards. After the resignation of Anas Sarwar as party leader he endorsed Joe Fagan in the 2026 Scottish Labour leadership election.

== See also ==
- 7th Scottish Parliament

Scottish Parliament
Preceded by Alasdair Allan	Member of the Scottish Parliament for the Western Isles; 2026–present	Incumbent
