= Michael Marra (politician) =

Scottish Labour politician

Michael Marra MSP
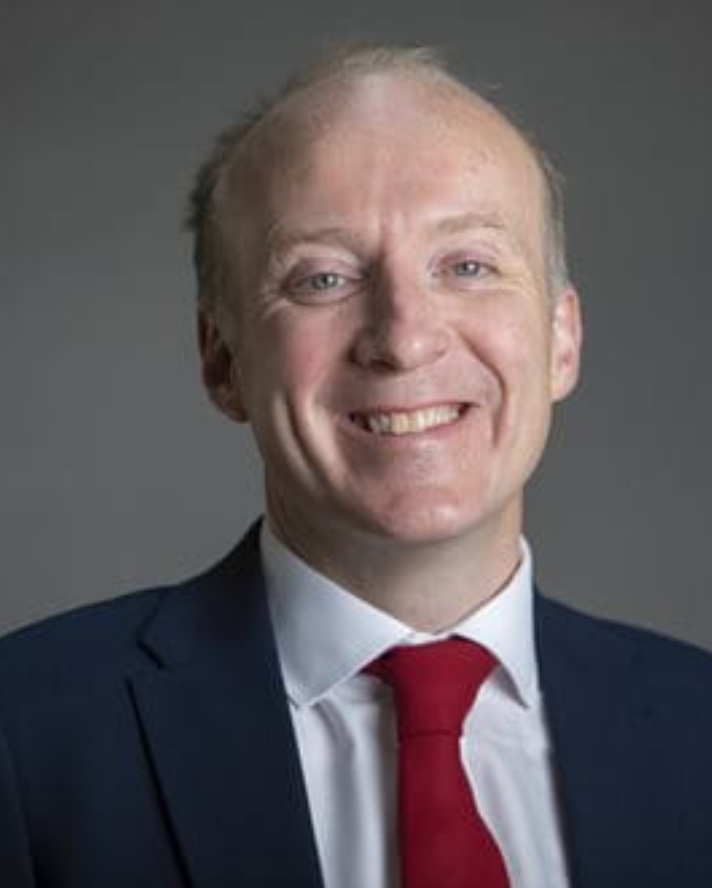
- Official portrait, 2026

Leader of the Scottish Labour Party
- Incumbent
- Assumed office 19 September 2026
- Deputy: Jackie Baillie
- UK party leader: Andy Burnham
- Preceded by: Anas Sarwar (Note: Jackie Baillie acted from 23 July to 19 September 2026)

Member of the Scottish Parliament for North East Scotland (1 of 7 Regional MSPs)
- Incumbent
- Assumed office 6 May 2021

Scottish Labour Portfolios
- 2021–2023: Shadow Cabinet Secretary for Education and Skills
- 2023–2026: Shadow Cabinet Secretary for Finance

Personal details
- Born: Michael James Marra; 1979 (age 46–47) Dundee, Scotland
- Party: Scottish Labour
- Children: 3
- Relatives: Jenny Marra (sister); Michael Marra (uncle)
- Education: University of Glasgow (MA); London School of Economics (MSc)

Michael James Marra (born 1979) is a Scottish politician who has been the Leader of the Scottish Labour Party since September 2026. He has been a Member of the Scottish Parliament (MSP) for North East Scotland since May 2021.

== Early life ==
Michael Marra was born in Dundee in 1979. He joined the Labour Party as a teenager.

Marra was educated at St John's High School, the University of Glasgow and the London School of Economics.

Before becoming an MSP, Marra worked for Oxfam and the Leverhulme Research Centre for Forensic Science at the University of Dundee.

== Early political career ==
Michael Marra was elected as a councillor in Dundee's Lochee ward in 2017. He stood down at the 2022 Scottish local elections.

Marra previously worked for Scottish Labour Leader Iain Gray as an adviser prior to and during the 2011 Scottish Parliamentary election.

In the 2015 United Kingdom general election, he contested Dundee West but lost to Chris Law from the SNP.

== Member of the Scottish Parliament (since 2021) ==
In November 2020, Marra was confirmed as a candidate on Labour's regional list for the North East, seeking to replace his sister Jenny Marra after her then almost decade long stint as an MSP.

On 8 May 2021 Marra was elected as a Member of the Scottish Parliament (MSP) for North East Scotland. He had been appointed as Education and Skills spokesperson in Scottish Labour's campaign cabinet just before the 2021 Scottish Parliament elections. He was retained as Shadow Cabinet Secretary for Education and Skills after the election.

He has described himself as being part of Labour's "soft left".

In 2022 he attempted to amend the Gender Recognition Reform (Scotland) Bill so that a counter-signatory would be required who "has known the applicant for at least 2 years, and (b) is a person of good standing in the community, or (c) works in a recognised profession". He was given special permission not to vote on the bill after his amendments were not accepted, claiming that without amendment the bill had a "lack of safeguards against bad faith actors". Scottish Labour supported the legislation and voting against it would have been incompatible with his front-bench position in the party. He stated "I could not vote for the final bill." Fellow MSPs Claire Baker and Carol Mochan both stepped down from their own spokesperson roles to vote against the bill.

In 2021 Michael Marra won the Holyrood magazine “One For The Watching” award, a newcomer award judged by a panel made up of senior MSPs, journalists, and Scotland’s two top pollsters.

In April 2023 it was announced he would take on the role of Shadow Cabinet Secretary for Finance.

Marra backed the UK Government’s decision to introduce means-testing for the Winter Fuel Payment, voting in the Scottish Parliament against calls to reverse the decision.

He is a member of the Fabian Society's executive committee.

In March 2026, Marra voted against the Assisted Dying for Terminally Ill Adults (Scotland) Bill.

=== Injury Time campaign ===
Since 2021, Marra has been campaigning for Alzheimer's disease in footballers to be classed as an industrial disease. A study carried out for the Football Association and the Professional Footballers’ Association in 2019 discovered that there was a five-fold increase in Alzheimer’s disease among the former players.

Marra had said: “The Scottish Government must recognise that these injuries are a form of industrial disease and allow these players to access the support they need, and deserve.”

=== 2026 Scottish Parliament election ===
Marra was selected as the Scottish Labour candidate for the Dundee City West constituency at the 2026 Scottish Parliament election, having led the party's policy development work and written its 2026 manifesto. At the election on 8 May 2026, he received 6,365 votes (24.56%) in Dundee City West, placing second behind the SNP's Heather Anderson, who received 12,722 votes (49.10%). Marra was subsequently re-elected as a regional list MSP for North East Scotland.

=== Scottish Labour leader ===
Anas Sarwar resigned as Leader of the Scottish Labour party on 23 July 2026 having resigned as an MSP the same day. Sarwar resigned in order to take up post as Minister of State for Trade in the Burnham Ministry.

On 27 July 2026, Marra signalled he would be standing in the 2026 Scottish Labour leadership election.

The Herald reported that allegations were made to it that Marra wanted to sack party staff and put them on short-term contracts after Labour’s performance in the May Scottish Parliament election. The allegations were denied by his campaign and allies.

In the contest, Marra received 4,266 votes from Labour members and affiliates, compared with Joe Fagan's 2,485.

Marra supports extracting oil and gas from the Rosebank and Jackdaw fields. Backing the development of these oil and gas fields was one of his first acts after being elected Scottish Labour leader.

== Personal life ==
Marra is married and has three children. His sister is the former Scottish Labour MSP Jenny Marra, and his uncle is the Dundonian folk singer Michael Marra, who died in 2012.

He is a lifelong Dundee United supporter.

== Notes ==
Party political offices
| Preceded by Anas Sarwar | Leader of the Scottish Labour Party; 2026–present | Incumbent |
