= Baroness Bryan =

Baroness Bryan may refer to:

- Margaret Bryan, Baroness Bryan
- Pauline Bryan, Baroness Bryan of Partick
