= Monica Lennon =

Scottish Labour politician

Monica Lennon MSP
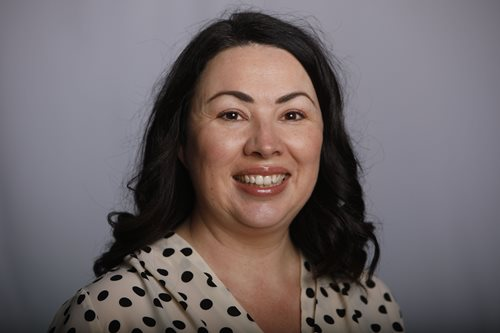
- Official portrait, 2026

Member of the Scottish Parliament (1 of 7 Regional MSPs)
- Incumbent
- Assumed office 29 July 2026
- Preceded by: Anas Sarwar
- Constituency: Glasgow
- In office 5 May 2016 – 9 April 2026
- Constituency: Central Scotland

Scottish Labour portfolios
- 2017–2018: Shadow Cabinet Secretary for Communities and Local Government
- 2019–2021: Shadow Cabinet Secretary for Health and Sport
- Mar–Jun 2021: Shadow Cabinet Secretary for Economy, Jobs and Fair Work
- Jun–Nov 2021: Shadow Cabinet Secretary for Net Zero, Energy and Transport

Personal details
- Born: Monica Ward; 7 January 1981 (age 45) Bellshill, North Lanarkshire, Scotland
- Party: Scottish Labour Co-op
- Spouse: Jim Lennon
- Children: 1
- Education: University of Strathclyde

Monica Lennon (née Ward; born 7 January 1981) is a Scottish politician who has served as a Member of the Scottish Parliament (MSP) for the Glasgow region since July 2026. Lennon was previously an MSP for the Central Scotland region from 2016 to 2026. A member of the Scottish Labour and Co-Operative Party, she has served in various roles on the shadow front bench.

She was previously the Scottish Labour Spokesperson for Health and Sport from 2018 to 2021, Scottish Labour Spokesperson for Economy, Jobs and Fair Work from March 2021 to June 2021 and Scottish Labour Spokesperson for Net Zero, Energy and Transport from June 2021 to November 2021. She was a candidate in the 2021 Scottish Labour leadership election and served on the Scottish Parliament's Net Zero, Energy and Transport Committee. Following Sarwar's resignation as leader of Scottish Labour, Lennon announced her candidacy in the 2026 Scottish Labour leadership election, but failed to secure enough nominations from Scottish Labour MPs.

== Early life and career ==
Lennon was born in Bellshill and raised in Blantyre, South Lanarkshire, the daughter of Gerry Ward, a council health and safety manager, and his wife Helen. She attended the co-educational Roman Catholic John Ogilvie High School in Hamilton. She studied environmental planning at the University of Strathclyde, graduating with a Bachelor of Arts degree in 2001. While studying she lived with her father. Her parents had separated, and later divorced, as a result of her father's drinking which developed into severe alcoholism.

From 2001 to 2007, Lennon worked as a planning officer for South Lanarkshire Council. She married at the age of 24 but felt forced to exclude her father from the wedding because of his alcoholism; he died at the age of 60.

After leaving South Lanarkshire Council, she worked as a surveyor for commercial property consultancy Knight Frank, also freelancing as a planning consultant, until her election in 2012.

== Political career ==
=== Early political career ===
Motivated by the 2008 financial crash and a desire to challenge the incoming Conservative government, Lennon joined the Labour Party during the 2010 election campaign. She had previously helped done leafleting for her uncle, who was a local Labour councillor.

She later transitioned into local politics when she was elected to represent the Hamilton North and East ward in the 2012 South Lanarkshire Council election, a role she held until 2016.

=== Member of the Scottish Parliament (2016–2026) ===
In the 2016 Scottish Parliament election, she was second on Scottish Labour's Central Scotland regional list and was elected as a Member of the Scottish Parliament. Shortly after being elected she was appointed by leader Kezia Dugdale as Shadow Minister for Inequalities, a role in which she campaigned to raise awareness about the need for women to check themselves for signs of breast cancer.

In the 2017 Scottish Labour leadership election, Lennon nominated fellow Central Scotland MSP and left-wing ally Richard Leonard. In December 2017, Leonard announced his new frontbench in which she was promoted to Spokesperson for Communities and Local Government.

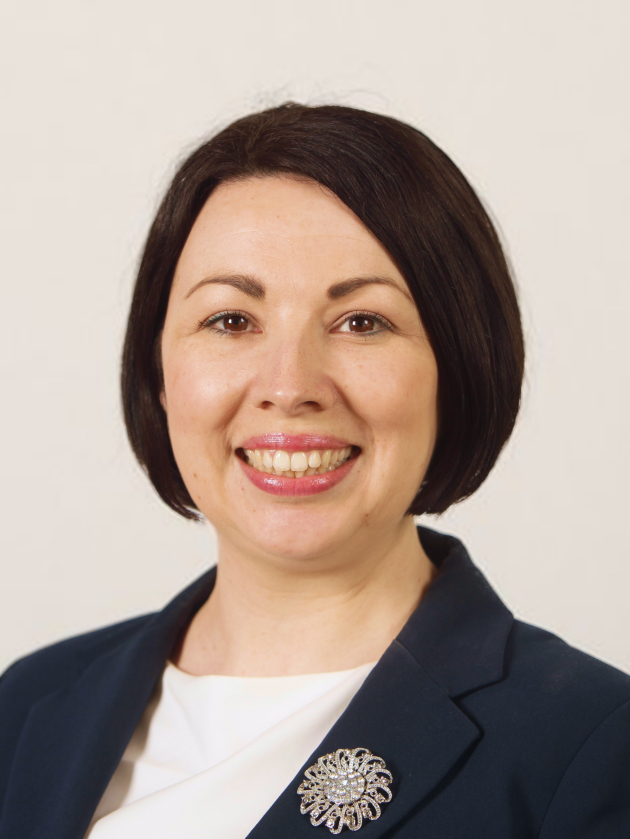
Lennon in 2016

In November 2017, Lennon went public with how she was sexually assaulted by a Labour colleague at a party in 2013, while other colleagues brushed off the incident. Following revelations of similar incidents within the party, she argued that the party and British politics had an institutional problem with sexual assault and harassment.

On 6 September 2018, Lennon made a speech in which she spoke of a constituent who had committed suicide shortly after Christmas 2017. The constituent pleaded with health services for help eight times in the six days directly before he died, but was either turned away or referred elsewhere. Lennon asked Nicola Sturgeon to take urgent action to review suicide prevention procedures in NHS Lanarkshire.

In an October 2018 Shadow Cabinet reshuffle, Lennon was again promoted to Spokesperson for Health and Sport, replacing Richard Leonard's former leadership rival Anas Sarwar. She used the position to campaign for institutions to provide free menstrual hygiene products, to tackle period poverty. The Period Products (Free Provision) (Scotland) Act was enacted in November 2020.

In 2020, Lennon was selected as the Scottish Labour Co-operative candidate in Hamilton, Larkhall and Stonehouse in the 2021 Scottish Parliament election. This was the first time she had stood as a joint Scottish Labour and Co-operative candidate. She was defeated by incumbent Christina McKelvie of the SNP, but was re-elected via the Central region list.

Along with Neil Findlay, Lennon abstained on an SNP government bill in favour of a second Scottish independence referendum. This was against their party's whip, which was to vote against the bill.

Following the resignation of Richard Leonard, Lennon joined the 2021 Scottish Labour leadership election. During the campaign, Lennon said she would not oppose a second Scottish independence referendum although would argue for an alternative Devo Max option. She commented that the war on drugs had failed and drug laws should be devolved to Scotland and drugs decriminalised. She also said people across the UK "deserve a public health approach that meets their needs". She pledged to end the care home "dementia tax" and said Scottish Labour with her as leader would commit to reviewing social care policies to ensure people with advanced dementia receive equal treatment. She has backed Alzheimer Scotland's Fair Dementia Care campaign. She was defeated by her rival Anas Sarwar.

In the wake of anti-abortion protests in Glasgow in the spring of 2022, Lennon called for an emergency summit in Holyrood.

Lennon was one of 5 Labour MSPs who was absent for a Scottish Parliament vote in 2024 calling for the UK Government to reverse its decision to means-test the Winter Fuel Payment.

At the 2026 Scottish Parliament election, Lennon stood as the Scottish Labour candidate for the Rutherglen and Cambuslang constituency. She was defeated by the incumbent SNP MSP Clare Haughey, who received 14,969 votes (44.2%) to Lennon's 9,125 (26.9%). Lennon was placed fourth on the Glasgow regional list, but as Labour won only three seats, she was not returned to the Scottish Parliament.

=== Return to Parliament (2026–) ===
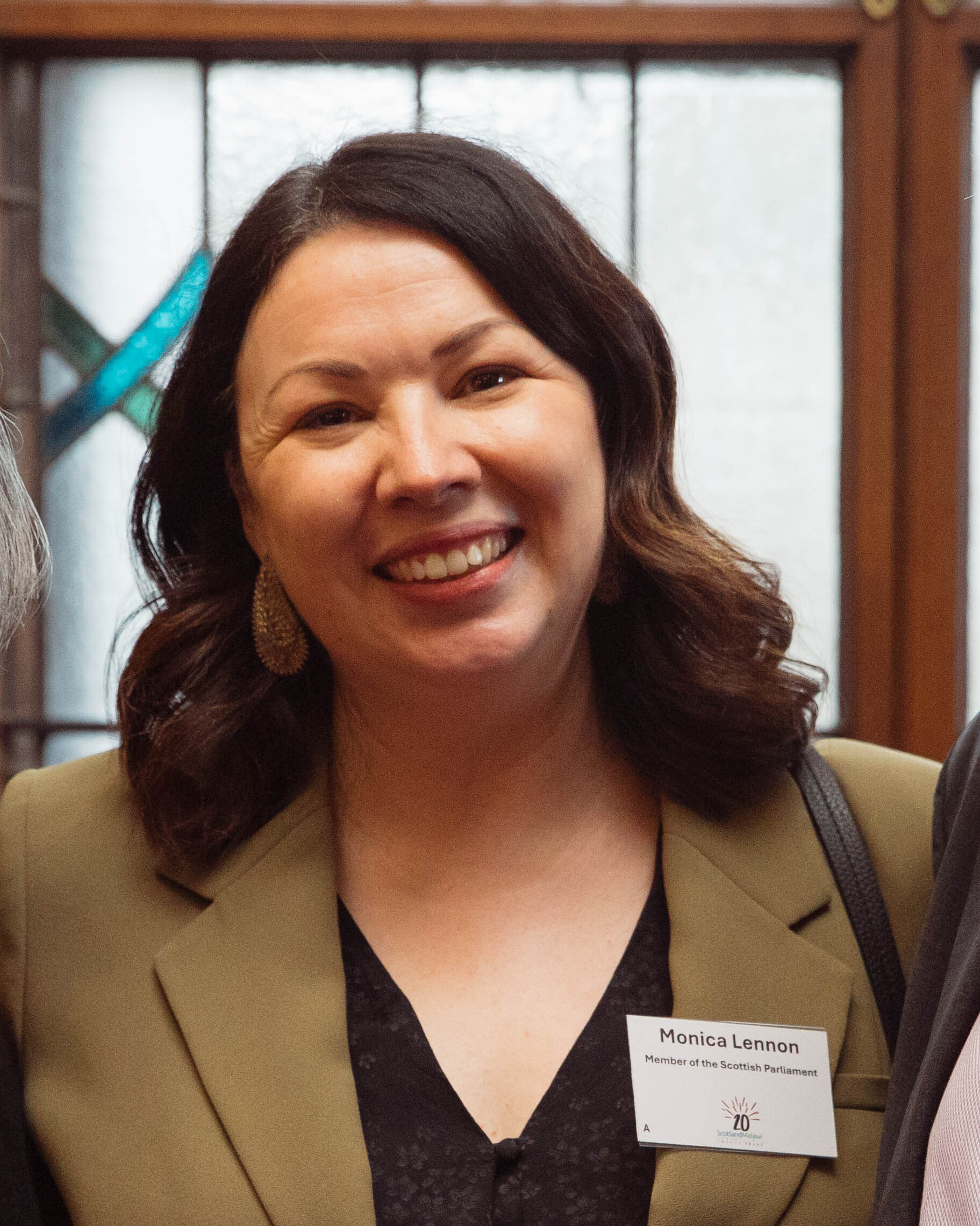
Lennon in January 2026

On 17 March 2026, Lennon voted in favour of the Assisted Dying for Terminally Ill Adults (Scotland) Bill, however, the bill failed to pass.

On 22 July 2026, Anas Sarwar was appointed as Minister of State for Trade by Andy Burnham, and was expected to be given a life peerage in the House of Lords. He then resigned as Leader of the Scottish Labour Party, and as an MSP for the Glasgow region, thus allowing Lennon to take his place as a regional MSP for the Glasgow region, as she was the next candidate on Labour's regional list at the 2026 election. Lennon was subsequently appointed as a regional MSP for Glasgow on 29 July 2026.

On 24 July, she speculated on her potential candidacy to replace Sarwar as leader. On 26 July, Lennon announced her intention to stand in the 2026 Scottish Labour leadership election. She warned the party faces “oblivion” and pledged “radical and fast” change. During the campaign, she said she opposed Scottish Labour separating from the wider UK-wide Labour party. In August 2026, she ultimately failed to secure enough nominations to join Michael Marra and Joe Fagan in the leadership contest. Both Marra and Fagan have expressed scepticism about recent attempts to simplify legal sex recognition. Lennon was an outspoken supporter of transgender rights and said Scottish Labour should show compassion and respect towards trans people.

== Personal life ==
Lennon is married to Jim Lennon and has one daughter, Isabella. She is a feminist and a vegetarian, and suffers from ailurophobia, an irrational fear of cats.
