= Carol Mochan =

Scottish Labour politician

Carol Mochan MSP
- Official portrait, 2026

Member of the Scottish Parliament for South Scotland (1 of 7 Regional MSPs)
- Incumbent
- Assumed office 6 May 2021

Shadow Minister for Mental Wellbeing, Women's Health and Sport
- Incumbent
- Assumed office 31 May 2021

Personal details
- Party: Scottish Labour

Carol Mochan is a Scottish Labour politician. She has been a Member of the Scottish Parliament (MSP) for the South Scotland region since the election in May 2021.

== Background ==
Mochan grew up in Ayrshire where she attended Girvan Primary School and Auchinleck Academy. She worked in the NHS as a dietitian for 17 years before launching a small business providing children's services. She lives in Mauchline, East Ayrshire. Prior to her election to the Scottish Parliament, she was active in many roles within the community: a member of the community council and community association, chair of a parent led toddler group, and part of the school parent council.

== Political career ==
Mochan has served as Chair of the Carrick Cumnock and Doon Valley Constituency Labour Party.

At the 2016 Scottish Parliament election, Mochan was the Labour candidate in Carrick, Cumnock and Doon Valley, taking second place with 8,684 votes (27.4%).

Mochan stood in the 2017 East Ayrshire Council election, as the running mate to incumbent councillor Billy Crawford in the Cumnock and New Cumnock ward. She took 295 first-preference votes (6.6%), being eliminated on the sixth count.

At the 2017 general election, Mochan stood in Ayr, Carrick and Cumnock, where she finished third with 11,024 votes (23.9%).

=== Member of the Scottish Parliament ===
Mochan ran again in Carrick, Cumnock and Doon Valley at the 2021 Scottish Parliament election. During the election campaign, Scottish Labour leader Anas Sarwar appointed Mochan as the party's mental health spokesperson. In the constituency, she finished third with a decreased vote share of 24.2%. Mochan was instead elected as one of the party's three regional MSPs for South Scotland. Shortly after her election, Mochan was appointed to the Shadow Cabinet as Shadow Minister for Mental Wellbeing, Women's Health and Sport.

She was one of only two Labour MSPs to vote against the Gender Recognition Reform (Scotland) Bill.

Mochan was one of 5 Labour MSPs who was absent for a Scottish Parliament vote calling for the UK Government to reverse its decision to means-test the Winter Fuel Payment.

She stood for the constituency of Carrick, Cumnock and Doon Valley during the 2026 Scottish Parliament election but placed third. She was reelected on the regional list for South Scotland.

In July 2026, she was reported as a potential candidate for the 2026 Scottish Labour leadership election.

== Personal life ==
She is married and has two children. Mochan identifies as a socialist and a feminist.
