= 2021 Scottish Labour leadership election =

- 9–27 February 2021
- Turnout: 42.44% (▼19.86pp)
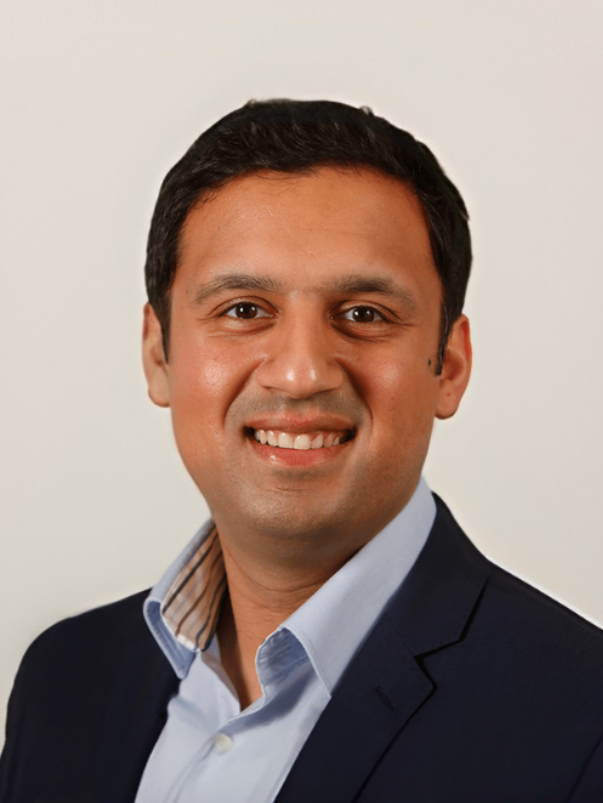

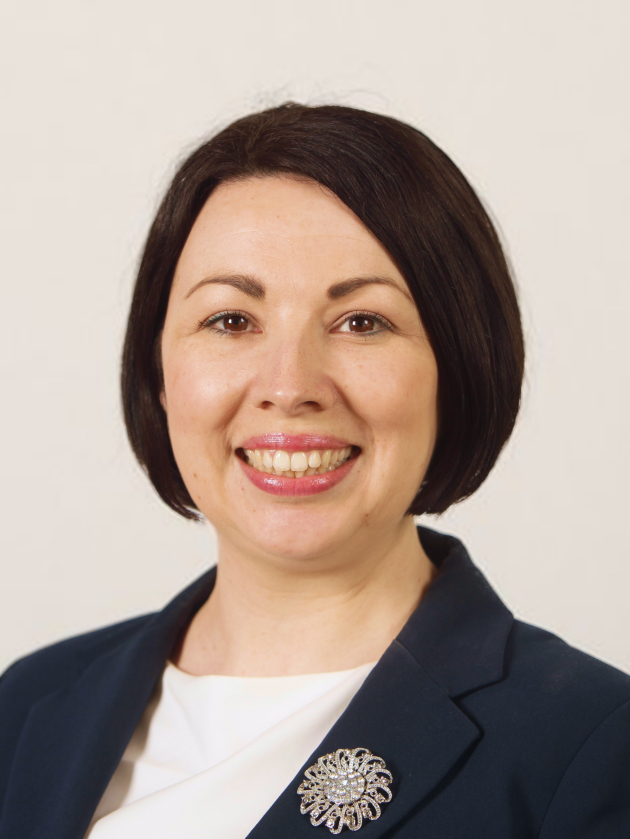
Candidate	Anas Sarwar	Monica Lennon
Percentage	57.6%	42.4%
Leader before election
Jackie Baillie (acting)
Richard Leonard
Elected Leader
Anas Sarwar

The 2021 Scottish Labour leadership election was triggered on 14 January 2021 by the resignation of Richard Leonard as leader of the Scottish Labour Party, who had led the party since 2017. Two candidates were nominated, Anas Sarwar and Monica Lennon.

Ballots opened on 9 February and closed on 26 February. Sarwar was elected as leader on 27 February, winning 57.6% of the vote to Lennon's 42.4%.

== Background ==
Richard Leonard was elected as the leader of the Scottish Labour Party in 2017 when he defeated Anas Sarwar to win with 56.7% of the vote. In the 2019 European Parliament election, the party lost its two seats in European Parliament for the Scotland constituency, and in the 2019 general election, the party lost six of its seven Scottish MPs. Scottish Labour figures including Labour Members of the Scottish Parliament (MSPs) had called for him to resign during 2020 over the party's poor performance in opinion polls. A motion of no confidence in Leonard was proposed at the party's SEC (Scottish Executive Committee) but withdrawn due to a lack of support. Leonard resigned on 14 January 2021, saying that speculation about his leadership was a distraction from the party's message.

== Procedure ==
On 16 January, the Scottish Labour Executive Committee met and approved the procedure and timetable for the leadership election. Candidates needed to declare their intention to run by midnight on 17 January, with nominations opening the following day. To be formally nominated, a candidate needs to be nominated by at least four of the party's 23 MSPs or by the party's only MP, Ian Murray.

=== Timetable ===
Date	Event
18 January	Nominations open
19 January	Supporting nominations open; hustings period opens
20 January	Latest date to join in order to vote
26 January	Supporting nominations close
9 February	Ballot opens
26 February	Ballot closes
27 February	Result announcement

== Campaign ==
On 16 January 2021, Anas Sarwar, the party's constitution spokesperson and a candidate in the 2017 Scottish Labour leadership election, announced in an article in The Guardian that he was standing in the election, saying that the Scottish Government should focus on achieving equality rather than independence. On 18 January, over a quarter of Scottish Labour councillors signed a letter endorsing Sarwar as leader.

Monica Lennon, the party's health spokesperson, announced she was standing on Twitter on 17 January. In 2020, she had called for the Scottish Labour Party to split from the UK-wide Labour Party.

On 19 January, it was announced that both candidates had received the required nominations for them to progress to the next stage.

On the same day as both candidates received the required nominations for the next stage, Lennon told The Herald that she supported Scottish Labour being the party of devo-max and believed that the party should not block a second independence referendum. She did not support a referendum being held at the current time due to the "pandemic and the need for economic recovery."

On 21 January, Sarwar published an article in LabourList establishing his priorities. In the article, he called for modernisation and professionalism in campaigning and set his agenda focusing on "poverty, inequality, schools, health and jobs."

On 2 February, Lennon laid out her vision on ending child poverty within a decade which was published in the Daily Record. She pledged to increase the child payment to £30 a week, provide funding to councils to provide extra support and to provide affordable homes for all.

On 9 February, BBC Scotland hosted a debate between the two candidates. Both candidates discussed their positions on Scottish independence, with Sarwar laying out his opposition to another referendum on independence. Additionally, both candidates suggested that Scottish income taxes should be increased, with Sarwar supporting a 5% increase for the highest tax band and a 2% increase for people earning over £100,000 while Lennon called for a 'national conversation' to look at the wider range of taxes while also supporting an increase for top earners.

On 10 February, Lennon called for increased investment into broadband, claiming that her plan would improve productivity and innovation as well as generating More high skilled jobs. Her proposal was supported by the Communications Workers Union.

On 15 February, Lennon was interviewed by LabourList in which she discussed her support for a 'third option' on any future independence referendum. Additionally she advocated for a 'bottom-up' approach to Labour's plans for devolution compared to the constitution commission established by the Leader of the National Party Keir Starmer.

On 21 February, Lennon pledged to make free universal music tuition in state schools a manifesto pledge if she was elected leader, this policy was welcomed by Stuart Braithwaite.

Lennon wrote an op-ed in Pink News, in which she voiced her support for reforming the Gender Recognition Act and criticised the SNP government for not doing it already. "I have spoken out to condemn the transphobia that so many trans and non-binary people face on a daily basis. I believe that we have a duty to stand by those who are being unfairly marginalised, and I will stand by the trans community now," she said. "Trans people should not have to go through a bureaucratic and dehumanising process to have the law recognise who they already are."

== Hustings ==
Several hustings were organised across late January to February.

Date	Hustings
25 January 2021	North East Scotland/Highlands & Islands
30 January 2021	West Scotland/Mid Scotland & Fife
3 February 2021	Glasgow/Central Scotland
6 February 2021	Lothian/South Scotland
13 February 2021	Scottish Labour Women’s Hustings
16 February 2021	LGBT+ Labour Scotland Hustings
20 February 2021	Scottish Young Labour Hustings

== Candidates ==
Candidate	Born	Political office	Announced
Monica Lennon	7 January 1981; Bellshill, Scotland	Health spokesperson (since 2018); MSP for Central Scotland (since 2016); Communities spokesperson (2017–2018)	17 January 2021
Anas Sarwar	14 March 1983; Glasgow, Scotland	Constitution spokesperson (since 2020); MSP for Glasgow (since 2016); Deputy leader of the Scottish Labour Party (2011–2014); MP for Glasgow Central (2010–2015)	16 January 2021

=== Declined ===
The following people were speculated about as potential candidates but declined to stand.

- Jackie Baillie, deputy leader, finance spokesperson, and MSP for Dumbarton
- James Kelly, former justice spokesperson and MSP for Glasgow (endorsed Sarwar)
- Ian Murray, shadow Scotland secretary and MP for Edinburgh South (endorsed Sarwar)

== Nominations ==
The table below shows the number of nominations achieved by each candidate. Both candidates have received enough nominations to proceed to the next stage.

Candidate	Labour MPs and MSPs	
Candidate	Nominations	%
Anas Sarwar	17 / 24	71%
Monica Lennon	5 / 24	21%

=== List of nominations ===
Below is a list the MPs and MSPs who nominated each candidate. Both candidates also nominated themselves.

==== Monica Lennon ====
- Neil Findlay, MSP for Lothian
- Rhoda Grant, MSP for Highlands and Islands
- Alex Rowley, MSP for Mid Scotland and Fife
- Elaine Smith, MSP for Central Scotland

==== Anas Sarwar ====
- Claire Baker, MSP for Mid Scotland and Fife
- Claudia Beamish, MSP for South Scotland
- Sarah Boyack, MSP for Lothian
- Neil Bibby, MSP for West Scotland
- Mary Fee, MSP for West Scotland
- Iain Gray, MSP for East Lothian
- Mark Griffin, MSP for Central Scotland
- Daniel Johnson, MSP for Edinburgh Southern
- James Kelly, MSP for Glasgow
- Johann Lamont, MSP for Glasgow
- Lewis Macdonald, MSP for North East Scotland
- Jenny Marra, MSP for North East Scotland
- Pauline McNeill, MSP for Glasgow
- Ian Murray, MP for Edinburgh South
- Colin Smyth, MSP for South Scotland
- David Stewart, MSP for Highlands and Islands

== Endorsements and supporting nominations ==
Supporting nominations by CLP

=== Monica Lennon ===
==== Labour politicians ====
- Ged Killen, MP for Rutherglen and Hamilton West from 2017 to 2019

==== Organisations ====
- Unite the Union
- UNISON Scotland Labour Link
- Communication Workers Union (CWU) - Scotland Region
- Scottish Labour Students
- Socialist Health Association Scotland
- Christians on the Left
- Open Labour Scotland
- Socialist Educational Association Scotland
- Transport Salaried Staffs' Association (TSSA)
- Socialist Campaign Group
- Campaign for Socialism

=== Anas Sarwar ===
==== Labour politicians ====
- Jack McConnell, First Minister of Scotland and leader of Scottish Labour from 2001 to 2007
- Frank McAveety, former leader of Glasgow City Council and former minister for tourism, culture and sport
- Gordon Brown, Prime Minister of the United Kingdom and leader of the Labour Party from 2007 to 2010

==== Organisations ====
- Union of Shop, Distributive and Allied Workers (USDAW)
- Labour Movement for Europe
- BAME Labour Scotland
- GMB (trade union)
- Community
- National Union of Mineworkers (NUM)
- Jewish Labour Movement
- Scottish Co-operative Party
- Socialist Environment and Resources Association (SERA)

== Results ==
Results were announced on 27 February 2021.

Candidate	Party members	Affiliated supporters	Total
Candidate	%	%	%
Anas Sarwar	61.21%	49.31%	57.56%
Monica Lennon	38.75%	50.64%	42.44%

== Opinion polls ==
=== Best Leader ===
Pollster	Client	Dates conducted	Sample size	Group	Monica Lennon	Anas Sarwar	Don’t know
Ipsos MORI (Note: Archived 26 February 2021 at the Wayback Machine)	STV News	15–21 Feb 2021	1,031	All voters	25%	28%	44%
Ipsos MORI	STV News	15–21 Feb 2021	142	Labour supporters	35%	40%	25%
Ipsos MORI	STV News	15–21 Feb 2021	209	Conservative supporters	21%	34%	40%
Ipsos MORI	STV News	15–21 Feb 2021	456	SNP supporters	29%	26%	43%
