= Scottish Labour =

Wing of the UK Labour Party in Scotland

Scottish Labour Pàrtaidh Làbarach na h-Alba
- Leader: Michael Marra
- Deputy Leader: Jackie Baillie
- General Secretary: Kate Watson
- Founder: Robert Bontine Cunninghame Graham Keir Hardie
- Founded: 1888 (original form); 1994 (current form)
- Preceded by: Scottish Labour Party (1888)
- Headquarters: Donald Dewar House, 139 Norfolk Street, Tradeston, Glasgow, G5 9EA
- Student wing: Scottish Labour Students
- Youth wing: Scottish Young Labour
- Membership (August 2026): 11,000
- Ideology: Social democracy; British unionism
- Political position: Centre-left
- UK Parliament affiliation: Labour Party (UK)
- Affiliate party: Co-operative Party (Labour and Co-operative Party)
- Colours: Red
- House of Commons: 37 / 57 (Scottish seats)
- Scottish Parliament: 17 / 129
- Local government in Scotland: 262 / 1,226
- Councils led in Scotland: 10 / 32

Election symbol

Website
- scottishlabour.org.uk

Scottish Labour (Scottish Gaelic: Pàrtaidh Làbarach na h-Alba) is the part of the UK Labour Party active in Scotland. Ideologically social democratic and unionist, it holds 17 of 129 seats in the Scottish Parliament and 37 of 57 Scottish seats in the House of Commons. It is represented by 262 of the 1,226 local councillors across Scotland. The Scottish Labour party has no separate Chief Whip at Westminster.

Throughout the later decades of the 20th century and into the first years of the 21st, Labour dominated politics in Scotland, winning the largest share of the vote in Scotland at every UK general election from 1964 to 2010, every European Parliament election from 1984 to 2004 and in the first two elections to the Scottish Parliament in 1999 and 2003. After this period, Scottish Labour formed a coalition with the Scottish Liberal Democrats, forming a majority Scottish Executive. Until recently, especially since the 2014 Scottish independence referendum, the party suffered significant decline, losing ground predominantly to the Scottish National Party, who advocate Scottish independence from the United Kingdom. Scottish Labour experienced one of their worst defeats ever at the 2015 general election. They were left with a sole seat in the House of Commons, Edinburgh South, and lost 40 of its 41 seats to the SNP. This was the first time the party had not dominated in Scotland since the Conservative Party landslide in 1959. At the 2016 Scottish Parliament election, the party lost 13 of its 37 seats, becoming the third-largest party after being surpassed by the Scottish Conservatives.

At the 2017 general election, Scottish Labour improved its fortunes and gained six seats from the SNP, bringing its total seat tally to seven and winning a 27% share of the vote. This was the first time since the 1918 general election, 99 years previously, that Labour had finished in third place at any general election in Scotland. Overall, the 2017 UK general election marked the first time in twenty years that the Labour Party had made net gains in the UK at any general election. The success was short-lived, however, and at the 2019 general election, Labour lost all new seats gained two years earlier, and again were left with Edinburgh South as their only Scottish seat in the House of Commons. Ian Murray has served as the MP for the constituency since 2010, and is currently one of Scotland's longest-serving MPs. The 2019 UK general election was Labour's worst result nationally in 84 years, with their lowest share of the vote recorded in Scotland since the December 1910 general election. The 2021 Scottish Parliament election saw Labour decline even further, continuing the trend of losing seats at each successive election; with 22 MSPs returned to the Scottish Parliament. The 2022 Scottish local elections resulted in Labour gaining 20 seats across Scottish local councils, with a slight increase in their share of the vote. At the 2024 general election, Scottish Labour won 37 seats and became the largest Scottish party in the House of Commons since the 2010 UK general election. However, the 2026 Scottish Parliament election saw the party receive its worst results in history.

== Organisation ==
Scottish Labour is registered with the UK Electoral Commission as a description and Accounting Unit (AU) of the UK Labour Party and is therefore not a registered political party under the terms of the Political Parties, Elections and Referendums Act 2000. It does however have autonomy from the UK Labour Party. As with Welsh Labour, Scottish Labour has its own general secretary which is the administrative head of the party, responsible for the day-to-day running of the organisation, and reports to the UK General Secretary of the Labour Party. The Scottish Labour headquarters is currently at Bath Street, Glasgow. It was formerly co-located with the offices of Unite the Union at John Smith House, 145 West Regent Street. The party holds an annual conference during February/March each year.

=== Scottish Executive Committee ===
Scottish Labour is administered by the Glasgow-based Scottish Executive Committee (SEC), which is responsible to the Labour Party's London-based National Executive Committee (NEC). The Scottish Executive Committee is made up of representatives of party members, elected members and party affiliates, for example, trade unions and socialist societies.

Party Officers:

- Chair: Cara Hilton
- Vice Chair: Karen Whitefield
- Treasurer: Cathy Peattie

=== Membership ===
Scottish Labour membership since 1997
Labour Party full members (excluding affiliates and supporters)

In 2008, Scottish Labour membership was reported as 17,000, down from a peak of approximately 30,000 in the run-up to the 1997 general election. The figures included in the Annual Report presented to the Scottish Party Conference in 2008, also recorded that more than half of all Constituency Labour Parties (CLPs) had less than 300 members, with 14 having less than 200 members.

In September 2010, the party issued 13,135 ballot papers to party members during the Labour Party (UK) leadership election. These did not necessarily equate to 13,135 individual members – due to the party's electoral structure, members can qualify for multiple votes. The party has declined to reveal its membership figures since 2008, and did not publish the number of votes cast in the leadership elections of 2011 or 2014, only percentages.

In November 2014 the party's membership was claimed by an unnamed source reported in the Sunday Herald to be 13,500. Other reports in the media at around this time quoted figures of "as low as 8,000" (the Evening Times) and "less than 10,000" (New Statesman). In December 2014 the newly elected leader Jim Murphy claimed that the figure was "about 20,000" on the TV programme Scotland Tonight.

In late September 2015, following a membership boost resulting from the 2015 Labour leadership election, a total of 29,899 people were associated with the party; 18,824 members, 7,790 people affiliated through trade unions and other groups, and 3,285 registered supporters. In September 2017, it was reported that the party had 21,500 members and 9,500 affiliated through trade unions and other groups, making a total of 31,000 people associated with the party. In January 2018, the total Scottish membership stood at 25,836, however within 12 months it was leaked in January 2019 that this value had fallen by 4,674 to 21,162.

In February 2021, the membership figure was down to 16,467. Leaked figures obtained by the Daily Record in February 2022 showed that nearly one third of Scottish Labour members were in favour of another Scottish independence referendum. Asked whether "in principle" there should be a referendum on independence, 30% agreed and 57% disagreed.

== History ==
=== 1900–1999: Formation and devolution ===
From the formation of the Labour Representation Committee in 1900, it had members in Scotland, but unlike in England and Wales, it made no pact with the Liberal Party and so initially struggled to make an impact. In 1899, the Scottish Trades Union Congress organised the Scottish Workers' Representation Committee, which merged into the Labour Party in 1909, greatly increasing its presence in Scotland. By this time, the party's structure in the nation was complex, with constituency parties, and branches of affiliated parties, but no co-ordination at the national level. To provide this, a Scottish Advisory Council was founded in 1915, its first conference chaired by Keir Hardie. This was later renamed as the Scottish Council of the Labour Party, informally known as the Labour Party in Scotland. In 1994 or 1995, it was renamed as the Scottish Labour Party. Under Kezia Dugdale, it was rebranded as Scottish Labour, though its official name remains the Scottish Labour Party.

In the early years, the Scottish Council had little power, and its conference could only consider motions on Scottish matters until 1972. However, this allowed it to devote significant time to the question of Scottish devolution. The Labour Party campaigned for the creation of a devolved Scottish Parliament as part of its wider policy of a devolved United Kingdom. In the late 1980s and 1990s it and its representatives participated in the Scottish Constitutional Convention with the Scottish Liberal Democrats, Scottish Greens, trades unions and churches, and also campaigned for a "Yes-Yes" vote in the 1997 referendum.

=== 1999–2007: In government ===
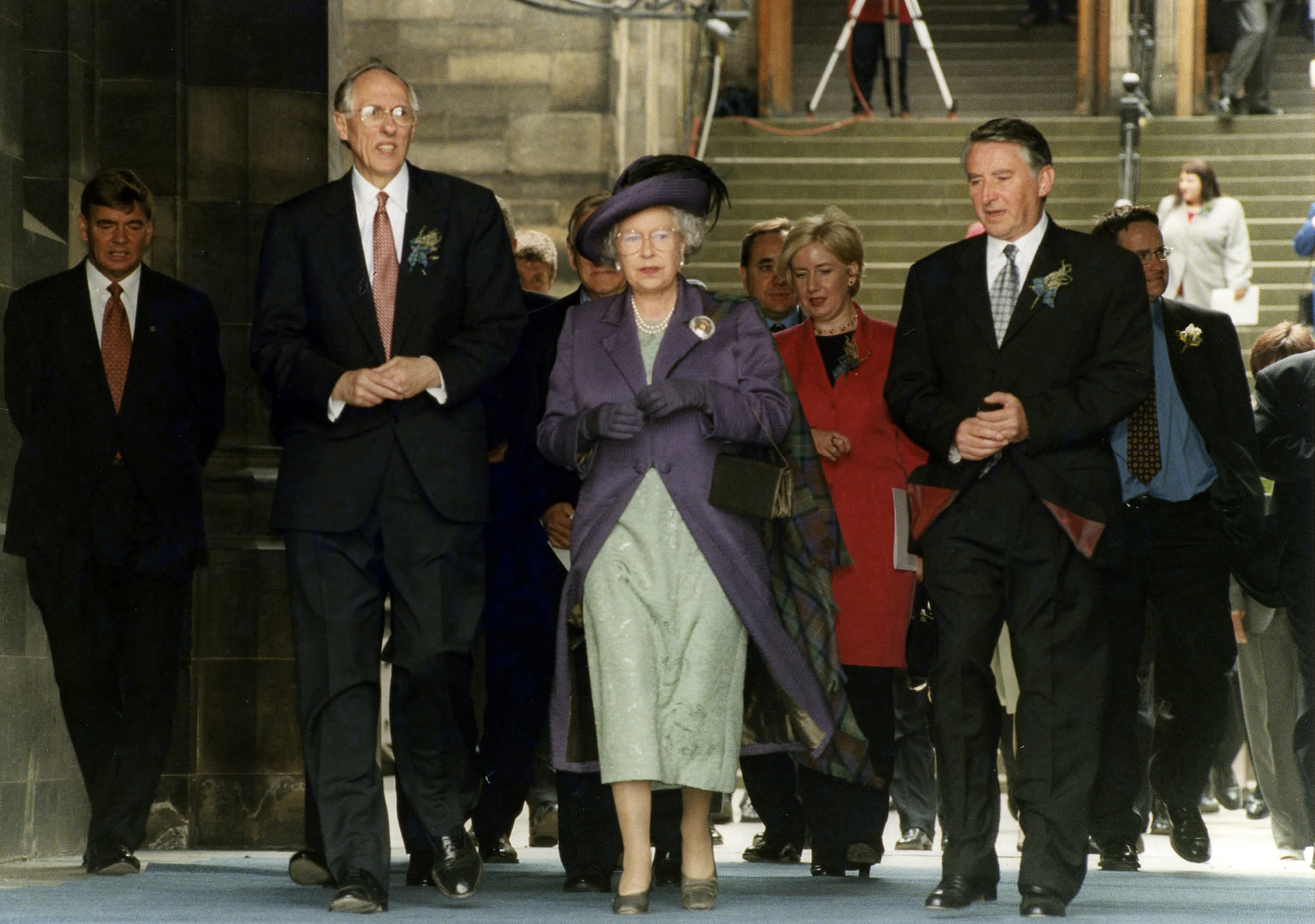
Donald Dewar alongside the Queen at the opening of the 1st Scottish Parliament, 1999

Donald Dewar led Labour's campaign for the first elections to the Scottish Parliament on 6 May 1999. Labour won the most votes and seats, with 56 seats out of 129 (including 53 of the 73 constituency seats), a clear distance ahead of the second-placed Scottish National Party (SNP). Labour entered government by forming a coalition with the Scottish Liberal Democrats, with Dewar agreeing to their demand for the abolition of up-front tuition fees for university students as the price for a coalition deal. Dewar became the inaugural First Minister of Scotland.

Dewar died only a year later on 11 October 2000. A new first minister was elected in a ballot by Scottish Labour's MSPs and national executive members, because there was insufficient time to hold a full leadership election. On 21 October, Henry McLeish was elected to succeed Dewar, defeating rival Jack McConnell. Labour's dominance of Scotland's Westminster seats continued in the 2001 general election, with a small loss of votes but no losses of seats.

McLeish resigned later that year amid a scandal involving allegations that he sub-let part of his tax-subsidised Westminster constituency office without it having been registered in the register of interests kept in the Parliamentary office, an affair which the press called Officegate. Though McLeish could not have personally benefited financially from the oversight, he undertook to repay the £36,000 rental income, and resigned to allow Scottish Labour a clean break to prepare for the 2003 Scottish Parliament election. After McLeish's resignation, McConnell quickly emerged as the only candidate, and was elected First Minister by the Parliament on 22 November 2001.

The coalition between Labour and the Liberal Democrats was narrowly re-elected at the Scottish Parliament election, with Labour losing seven seats and the Liberal Democrats gaining one. The SNP also lost seats, though other pro-independence parties made gains. Labour once again won the majority of seats in Scotland at the 2005 general election. The boundaries in Scotland were redrawn to reduce the number of Westminster constituencies in Scotland from 72 to 59. Labour had a notional loss of 5 seats and an actual loss of 15.

=== 2007–2010: Opposition at Holyrood ===
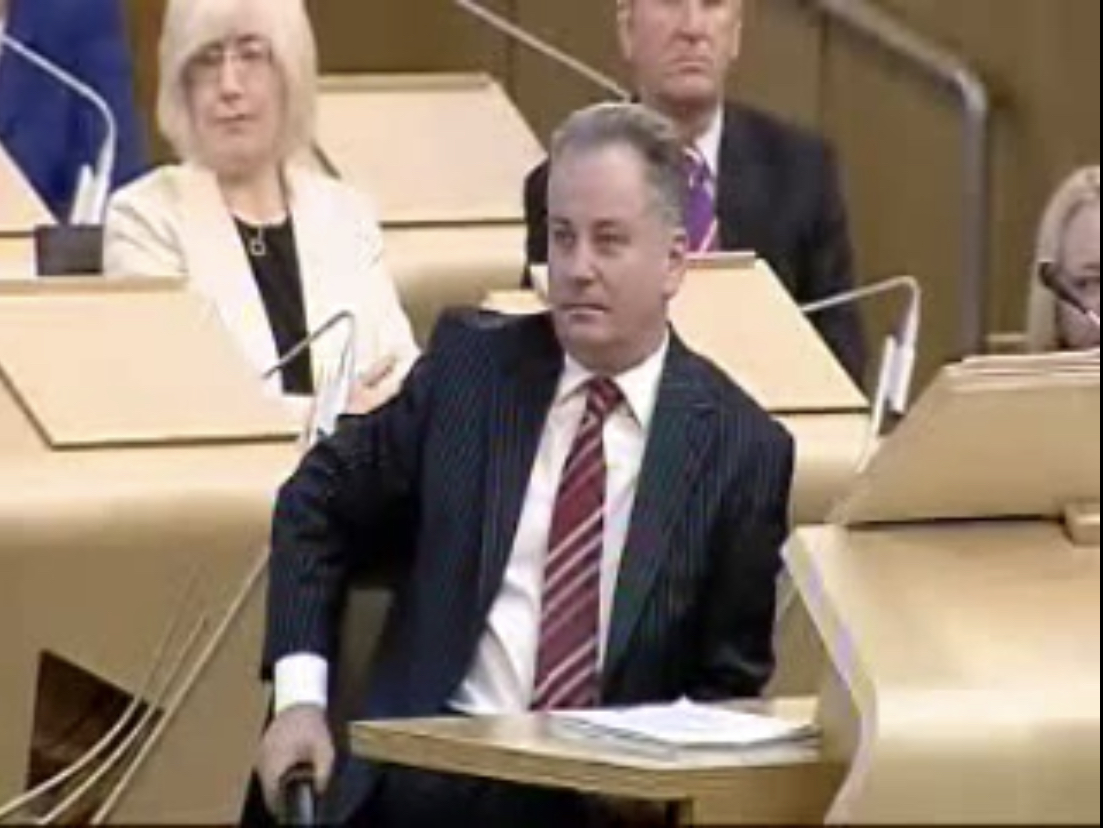
The Scottish Labour leader and former First Minister, Jack McConnell, in opposition following Scottish Labour's electoral defeat in 2007

At the start of the campaign for the 2007 Scottish Parliament election, Labour were behind the SNP in most of the opinion polls. On 10 April, McConnell unveiled Scottish Labour's election manifesto, which included plans to scrap bills for pensioners and reform Council Tax. The manifesto also proposed a large increase in public spending on education, which would allow for the school leaving age to be increased to 18 and reduce average class sizes to 19 pupils.

Labour lost 4 seats and fell narrowly behind the SNP, who won 47 seats to Labour's 46 seats. Labour still won the most constituencies, but the SNP made inroads. Both parties were well short of a majority in the parliament. SNP leader Alex Salmond was elected first minister with support from the Scottish Greens, defeating McConnell 49–46 while the Conservatives and Liberal Democrats abstained. Labour did take the most votes in the local elections on the same day but lost seats due to the introduction of proportional representation for local council elections. On 15 August 2007, McConnell announced his intention to resign as Scottish Labour leader. Wendy Alexander emerged as the only candidate to succeed him, and was installed as leader of the Labour group in the Scottish Parliament on 14 September 2007.

During a TV interview on 4 May 2008, Wendy Alexander performed a major U-turn on previous Scottish Labour policy by seeming to endorse a referendum on Scottish independence, despite previously refusing to support any referendum on the grounds that she did not support independence. During a further TV interview two days later, she reiterated this commitment to a referendum and claimed that she had the full backing of current British prime minister Gordon Brown. The following day, however, Brown denied this was Labour policy and that Alexander had been misrepresented during Prime Minister's Questions in Westminster. Additionally, Brown's spokesman said: "The prime minister has always been confident of the strength of the argument in favour of the Union and believes a referendum on Scottish independence would be defeated." Despite this lack of backing, Alexander once again reiterated her commitment to a referendum during First Minister's Questions in the Scottish Parliament.

On 28 June 2008, Alexander announced her resignation as Leader of Scottish Labour as a result of the pressure on her following the donation scandal. Cathy Jamieson subsequently became interim party leader. A month after, Labour lost a safe Westminster seat to the SNP in the Glasgow East by-election.

The 2008 Labour group leadership election was the first time Labour had elected its Scottish leader with the participation of its members, using a system similar to that used at the time by the UK-wide Labour Party (the system had been adopted in 2007, but no ballot had taken place as Alexander had been unopposed). The contenders were Iain Gray, MSP for East Lothian, a former Enterprise Minister in the previous Labour Executive, Andy Kerr, MSP for East Kilbride and former Health Secretary in the previous administration, and Cathy Jamieson MSP, the acting party leader who had been deputy leader under Jack McConnell. On 13 September 2008, Gray was elected leader and promised a "fresh start" for Labour in Scotland.

A few months later, Labour won the Glenrothes by-election in Fife. The result was considered a surprise, as there was speculation that the SNP could have won an upset similar to Glasgow East. The 2009 European Parliament election was catastrophic for Labour, falling behind the SNP for the first time and producing its worst results since before World War I. However, it easily won the Glasgow North East by-election later that year, which had been triggered by the resignation of House Speaker Michael Martin in the wake of the expenses scandal.

=== 2010–2012: Re-evaluating position ===
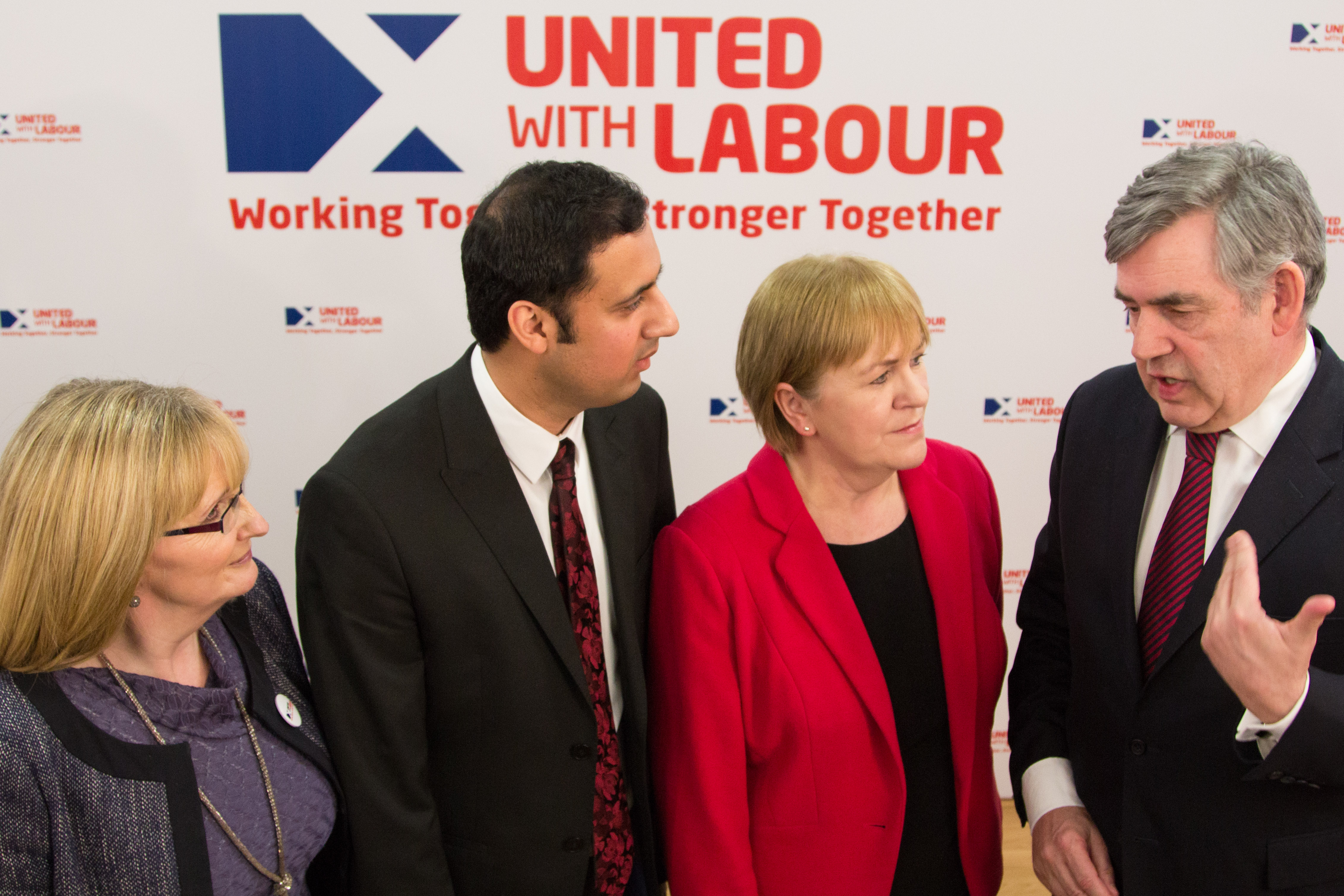
United with Labour launch

At the 2010 general election on 6 May 2010, contrary to polls preceding the election, Labour consolidated their vote in Scotland, losing no seats (despite losing 91 seats across the rest of Britain) and regained Glasgow East from the SNP. This resulted in incumbent Scottish secretary Jim Murphy stating that the result provided an impetus for Scottish Labour to attempt to become "the biggest party in Holyrood" in the 2011 Scottish Parliament elections.

Labour led the SNP in the polls for the 2011 Scottish Parliament election until the campaign began in March, at which point support for the SNP rallied. The SNP went on to win an unprecedented majority in the Scottish Parliament, a result that had been considered impossible under the proportional voting system. Labour had a net loss of 7 seats to the SNP. It also lost most of their constituency seats, although its share of the constituency vote declined by less than 1%. Labour's defeat was attributed to their campaign being directed mostly against the government in Westminster instead of the SNP. Party leader Iain Gray, who held on to his own seat by only 151 votes, announced that he would be resigning with effect from later in the year. Eight weeks later, Labour easily retained a Westminster seat at the Inverclyde by-election, suggesting that Scottish Labour's disappointing performance in the 2011 Scottish Parliament election would not necessarily translate into support for its political opponents in other elections.

Following the 2011 Scottish election, Ed Miliband commissioned the Review of the Labour Party in Scotland of the future structure and operation of the Labour Party in Scotland, co-chaired by Murphy and Sarah Boyack MSP. The review included a recommendation for a new post of Leader of the Scottish Labour Party to be created (previous Scottish Labour leaders had only been the leader of the Labour group in the Scottish Parliament). Others included more autonomy for the Scottish party and the reorganisation of members into branches based on Holyrood constituencies rather than Westminster constituencies. On 17 December 2011, Johann Lamont MSP was elected as leader and Anas Sarwar MP was elected as her deputy. Delivering her victory speech, Lamont said: "I want to change Scotland, but the only way we can change Scotland is by changing the Scottish Labour Party."

In the 2012 Scottish local elections, Labour were outpolled by the SNP. However, it gained votes and council seats and held its majorities on the councils of Glasgow and North Lanarkshire and regained control of Renfrewshire and West Dunbartonshire.

=== 2014 independence referendum and aftermath ===
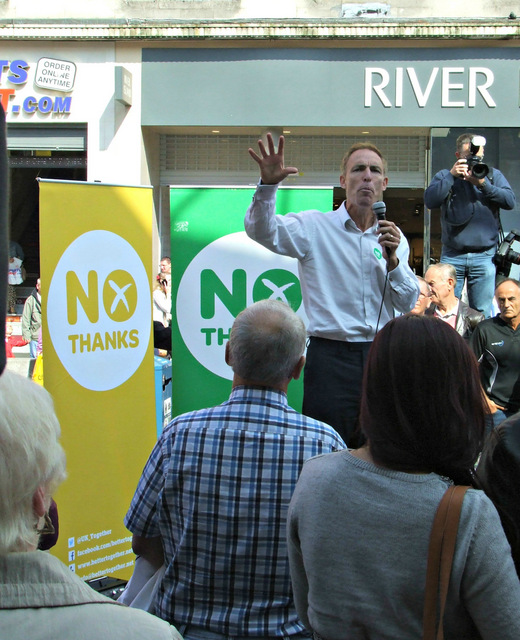
MP Jim Murphy, eventual leader of Scottish Labour, campaigning against Scottish independence, 2014

For the 2014 referendum on Scottish independence, Scottish Labour joined with the Conservatives and the Liberal Democrats to form the pro-union Better Together campaign against Scottish independence. It was led by Alistair Darling, a former Labour minister. In addition, Scottish Labour ran its own pro-UK campaign United with Labour alongside, with the support of former Prime Minister Gordon Brown. Anas Sarwar MP also led an unofficial organisation called the "2014 Truth Team", described by the party as "dedicated to cutting through the noise and delivering [...] facts on independence".

In July 2012, a member of Scottish Labour started Labour for Independence, a rebel group of Labour supporters who back Yes Scotland in the campaign for Scottish independence. The group was dismissed by the Scottish Labour leadership as lacking "real support" from within the party.

The referendum was held on 18 September 2014 and resulted in a 55.3%–44.7% victory for the No side. However, many of Labour's traditional strongholds favoured the Yes side, notably including Glasgow. The SNP had a surge in membership and gained a wide lead over Labour in the opinion polls.

On 24 October 2014, Johann Lamont announced her resignation as leader. She accused Labour's UK-wide leadership of undermining her attempts to reform the Scottish Labour Party and treating it "like a branch office of London." The party's 2014 leadership election was won by Jim Murphy, an MP who had previously served as Secretary of State for Scotland and been a prominent campaigner for the pro-Union side in the referendum. In his victory speech, Murphy said that his election marked a "fresh start" for Scottish Labour: "Scotland is changing and so too is Scottish Labour. I'm ambitious for our party because I'm ambitious for our country". He also said that he planned to defeat the SNP in 2016, and would use the increased powers being devolved to Holyrood to end poverty and inequality. In her speech after being elected deputy leader, Kezia Dugdale said that the party's "focus has to be on the future – a Scottish Labour party that's fighting fit and fighting for our future".

=== 2015–2021: Collapse at Westminster and Holyrood crisis ===
Results of the 2015 United Kingdom general election in Scotland, where Scottish Labour won one seat

Labour's poll ratings in Scotland did not reverse, and the party suffered a landslide defeat in the general election in May 2015, losing 40 of their 41 seats to the SNP. Many senior party figures were unseated, including Murphy himself (East Renfrewshire), Shadow Foreign Secretary Douglas Alexander (Paisley and Renfrewshire South) and Shadow Scotland Secretary Margaret Curran (Glasgow East). Ian Murray (Edinburgh South) was the only MP re-elected. It was the first time since 1959 that the party had not won the most votes in Scotland at a general election. On 16 May 2015, Murphy resigned as leader effective 13 June 2015. Under normal circumstances, Deputy Leader Kezia Dugdale would become acting leader, but former Leader Iain Gray was appointed Acting Leader whilst a leadership and a deputy leadership election are being simultaneously held on account of Dugdale resigning as Deputy Leader to stand for Leader. Dugdale won the 2015 leadership election on 15 August 2015, beating Ken Macintosh. On 1 November 2015, Scottish Labour Party delegates backed a vote to scrap the UK's Trident nuclear missile system. The motion was supported by an overwhelming majority, in which both party members and unions voted 70% in favor of the motion.

In the 2016 Scottish Parliament election, Labour lost a third of its seats, dropping from 37 to 24. Labour got its lowest percentage of the vote in Scotland in 98 years with 23% and fell into 3rd place, a position it last occupied in Scotland in 1910, behind the Conservatives. The party also only won 3 constituency seats: holding onto the Dumbarton and East Lothian constituencies and gaining the Edinburgh Southern constituency from the SNP, whilst losing eleven of its 2011 constituencies to the SNP and two to the Conservatives.

In the 2017 local elections, Labour's share of first preference votes fell from 31.4% to 20.2%, while it lost over 130 seats. This result meant the Party fell to third place in terms of both vote share and number of councillors. Labour also lost control of Glasgow and three other councils where it had a majority. At the beginning of the 2017 general election campaign, Labour's poll ratings fell to a historic low 13%, and were more than 15% behind the Conservatives in Scotland in some polls. However, towards the end of the campaign Labour's polling increased to levels around the 24% which it had received in 2015. On election day itself, the party managed to improve on its 2015 result and received 27% of the Scottish vote in a surprisingly good night for the party nationwide, and picked up 6 seats from the SNP in traditionally Labour areas such as Coatbridge, Glasgow, Kirkcaldy, and Rutherglen, bringing its Scottish number of seats to 7. Despite the positive result for the party, Labour remained in third place in Scotland, behind the Conservatives on 29%, and the SNP on 37%.

On 29 August 2017, Dugdale resigned as leader of the Scottish Labour Party. Her deputy, Alex Rowley, took over as acting leader until 15 November, when he was suspended from Scottish Labour's parliamentary party while a probe into his conduct took place. Jackie Baillie took over as acting leader until the conclusion of the leadership election. The election for a new leader of the Scottish Labour party took place between 11 September 2017 (when nominations opened) and 18 November 2017, when the new leader was announced. Nominations for leadership candidates closed on 17 September. Anyone that wished to vote in the leadership election must have either been a member of the Scottish Labour Party, an 'affiliated supporter' (through being signed up as a Scottish Labour Party supporter through an affiliated organisation or union), or a 'registered supporter' (which requires signing up online and paying a one-off fee of £12) by 9 October. Voting opened on 27 October and closed at midday on 17 November. Richard Leonard won the leadership election with 56.7% of the vote and was elected as the leader of the Scottish Labour Party on 18 November.

On 12 December 2019, Scottish Labour returned to having only one seat in Westminster (Edinburgh South). Leonard apologised for the UK party failing to address concerns over Brexit and for the Scottish party not having stopped what he described as the "SNP juggernaut". However, he said he would continue as leader and carry out a listening exercise.

After surviving previous calls for him to go, Leonard resigned as leader on 14 January 2021, triggering the 2021 Scottish Labour leadership election. Shortly afterwards, it was reported that Leonard had been pressured into resigning by wealthy donors, who told UK Labour leader Keir Starmer that they would not give money to the Westminster party unless Leonard quit.

=== 2021–2026: Anas Sarwar leadership ===
New Scottish Labour logo with a thistle rather than the traditional red rose

On 27 February 2021, former Deputy Leader Anas Sarwar was elected Leader of the Scottish Labour Party, defeating rival Monica Lennon by 57.6% to 42.4% and promised to heal and unite the party. At the 2021 Scottish Parliament election, Labour lost a further two seats including the constituency seat of East Lothian, bringing their number of MSPs to 22, an all-time low. They also recorded their worst performance on both the Constituency and List vote in terms of vote share, however it was better than had been predicted by many polls at the start of Sarwar's tenure as leader, some of which had predicted Labour to potentially fall to fourth place behind the Scottish Greens. Under Sarwar's leadership, Scottish Labour have re-affirmed their constitutional position of unionism which has led to a sometimes controversial selections of candidates. The party has been criticised for fielding a number of candidates affiliated with the Orange Order in local elections.

In February 2022, during an interview on Times Radio, Sarwar said: "[Labour] have got to demonstrate to people the kind of alternative we can have and the difference it would make to people's lives so they positively vote Labour, not just negatively vote against the Tories or the SNP. If I'm honest, I didn't quite grip or grasp how I think hollowed out we were as an organisation, not just in terms of our political message and our political result, as an organisation I hadn't really grasped how hollowed out we were." The party rebranded the following month, changing its traditional red rose logo to a red and purple thistle. A party spokesman said: "Scottish Labour is committed to transforming our party to win back the trust of the people to Scotland. We're on the side of the Scots, and hope they'll join us so we can build the future together. To do that we need new ideas and new thinking. At Scottish Labour conference this week you will hear Anas Sarwar relentlessly focus on the future."

==== 2022 Scottish local elections ====
At the 2022 local elections, Labour made minor gains and overtook the Conservatives into second place by gaining 20 seats and a slight increase in their share of the vote, but still finished far behind the SNP; with 282 seats overall, it was Labour's second worst-worst result since 1977, beaten only by the 262 seats won in 2017. The party was criticised in the aftermath of the elections for pledging to do no deals or partake in coalitions with the SNP or the Greens, instead choosing to work with the Conservatives and Liberal Democrats to form minority administrations in several cases. In Edinburgh, they suspended two councillors for refusing to vote for the deal which gave Conservatives positions within the council.

==== Second independence referendum ====
Results of the 2024 United Kingdom general election in Scotland, where Scottish Labour won 37 seats, becoming the largest Scottish party at Westminster

Sarwar, like Starmer, voiced his opposition to a proposed second Scottish independence referendum, stating that a Labour government would not grant a Section 30 order for one to be held. On 6 October 2023, Labour won the 2023 Rutherglen and Hamilton West by-election with the election of Michael Shanks. Michael Shanks was elected with a 24.1% swing from the SNP who held the seat since 2015.

==== 2024 UK general election ====
At the 2024 general election, across the United Kingdom, the Labour Party won the election with a landslide victory, winning 411 seats across the United Kingdom, with Scottish Labour winning 37 of the 57 Scottish seats contested at the election. The electoral success for Scottish Labour in Scotland at the 2024 UK general election was also considered a landslide, with Scottish Labour returning as the largest political party representing Scotland at the House of Commons. Scottish Labour Party leader, Anas Sarwar, said on the morning of the 5 July following the electoral success of the Scottish Labour Party "this is a historic day for Scotland and for the entire UK. People are waking up to the news that after 14 years of Conservative government, after 14 years of chaos and division, it has come to an end and Scotland and the UK has elected a Labour government". As new Prime Minister of the United Kingdom, Keir Starmer, began to select his new ministry cabinet on 5 July, Scottish Labour MP Ian Murray was subsequently appointed to the cabinet as Secretary of State for Scotland.

==== 2026 Scottish Parliament election ====
Labour's approval ratings both north and south of the border quickly tanked, however, with polls suggesting that Labour would fall behind Reform UK at the 2026 Scottish Parliament election. Sarwar told Starmer not to campaign for Scottish Labour in that election, saying, "I would say the best thing that Keir Starmer and the UK Labour government can do is be behind their doors and in their departments getting things right and changing our outcomes." On 9 February 2026, three months before the election, Sarwar called for Starmer to resign.

At the election, Labour's seat count declined for the sixth time in a row, dropping from 22 to 17 and placing joint second with Reform UK. Following the results, Sarwar said he intended to continue serving as leader, but resigned two months later to take up a ministerial role in the Burnham ministry. He was elevated to the House of Lords with a life peerage.

== Elected representatives (current) ==
=== House of Commons of the Parliament of the United Kingdom ===
MP	Constituency	In constituency since	Majority	Majority (%)	Notes
Zubir Ahmed	Glasgow South West	2024	3,285	9.2	
Douglas Alexander	Lothian East	2024	13,265	27.7	Secretary of State for Scotland 2006–2007, 2025–present; MP for Paisley South 1997–2005, Paisley and Renfrewshire South 2005–2015
Scott Arthur	Edinburgh South West	2024	6,217	13.6	
Richard Baker	Glenrothes and Mid Fife	2024	2,954	3.5	MSP for North East Scotland 2003–2016
Johanna Baxter	Paisley and Renfrewshire South	2024	6,527	15.8	
Maureen Burke	Glasgow North East	2024	4,637	14.6	
Irene Campbell	North Ayrshire and Arran	2024	3,551	8.4	
Torcuil Crichton	Na h-Eileanan an Iar	2024	3,836	28.4	
Graeme Downie	Dunfermline and Dollar	2024	8,241	18.5	
Patricia Ferguson	Glasgow West	2024	6,446	16.2	Chair of the Scottish Affairs Select Committee 2024–present; MSP for Glasgow Maryhill 1999–2011, Glasgow Maryhill and Springburn 2011–2016
Alan Gemmell	Central Ayrshire	2024	6,869	16.6	
Tracy Gilbert	Edinburgh North & Leith	2024	7,268	14.7	
John Grady	Glasgow East	2024	3,784	10.6	
Lillian Jones	Kilmarnock and Loudoun	2024	5,129	12.1	
Chris Kane	Stirling and Strathallan	2024	1,394	2.8	
Brian Leishman	Alloa and Grangemouth	2024	6,122	14.9	
Douglas McAllister	West Dunbartonshire	2024	6,010	15.2	
Martin McCluskey	Inverclyde and Renfrewshire West	2024	6,371	13.8	
Blair McDougall	East Renfrewshire	2024	8,421	16.8	
Gordon McKee	Glasgow South	2024	4,154	9.8	
Frank McNally	Coatbridge and Bellshill	2024	6,344	16.4	
Kirsty McNeill	Midlothian	2024	8,167	18.5	Parliamentary Under-Secretary of State for Scotland 2024–present
Chris Murray	Edinburgh East and Musselburgh	2024	3,715	8.1	
Ian Murray	Edinburgh South	2010	17,251	36.8	Minister of State for Digital Government and Data and Minister of State for Creative Industries, Media and Arts 2025–present; Secretary of State for Scotland 2024–2025; Shadow Secretary of State for Scotland 2015–2016, 2020–2024
Katrina Murray	Cumbernauld and Kirkintilloch	2024	4,144	10.1	
Pamela Nash	Motherwell, Wishaw and Carluke	2024	7,085	18.1	MP for Airdrie and Shotts 2010–2015
Gregor Poynton	Livingston	2024	3,528	7.9	
Joani Reid	East Kilbride and Strathaven	2024	9,057	19.4	Reid suspended her own Labour whip in March 2026 and sits as an independent
Martin Rhodes	Glasgow North	2024	3,539	10.2	
Michael Shanks	Rutherglen	2023	8,767	20.6	Minister of State for Energy 2024–present; MP for Rutherglen and Hamilton West 2023–2024
Euan Stainbank	Falkirk	2024	4,996	11.7	
Kenneth Stevenson	Airdrie and Shotts	2024	7,547	20.7	
Elaine Stewart	Ayr, Carrick and Cumnock	2024	4,154	10.1	
Kirsteen Sullivan	Bathgate and Linlithgow	2024	8,323	19.8	
Alison Taylor	Paisley and Renfrewshire North	2024	6,333	15.2	
Imogen Walker	Hamilton and Clyde Valley	2024	9,472	22.5	
Melanie Ward	Cowdenbeath and Kirkcaldy	2024	7,248	17.7	

=== Holyrood spokespeople ===
As of April 2023

- Anas Sarwar – Leader of the Scottish Labour Party
- Jackie Baillie – Deputy leader of Scottish Labour Party and general election campaign co-coordinator, Shadow Cabinet Secretary for NHS Recovery, Health and Social Care and Drugs Policy
- Ian Murray – Shadow Secretary of State for Scotland and general election campaign co-coordinator
- Neil Bibby – Shadow Cabinet Secretary for Constitution, External Affairs and Culture
- Sarah Boyack – Shadow Cabinet Secretary for Net Zero, Energy, and Just Transition
- Foysol Choudhury – Shadow Minister for Culture, Europe and International Development
- Katy Clark – Shadow Minister for Community Safety
- Pam Duncan-Glancy – Shadow Cabinet Secretary for Education and Skills
- Rhoda Grant – Shadow Cabinet Secretary for Rural Affairs, Land Reform and Islands
- Mark Griffin – Shadow Minister for Local Government and Housing
- Daniel Johnson – Shadow Cabinet Secretary for Economy, Business and Fair Work
- Pauline McNeill – Shadow Cabinet Secretary for Justice
- Michael Marra – Shadow Cabinet Secretary for Finance
- Carol Mochan – Shadow Minister for Public Health and Women's Health
- Paul O'Kane – Shadow Cabinet Secretary for Social Justice and Social Security, and Equalities
- Paul Sweeney – Shadow Minister for Mental Health and Veterans
- Colin Smyth – Shadow Cabinet Secretary for Economic Development and Rural Affairs
- Alex Rowley – Shadow Minister for Transport
- Mercedes Villalba – Shadow Minister for Environment and Biodiversity
- Martin Whitfield – Business Manager and Shadow Minister for Children and Young People

==== Members of the 7th Scottish Parliament (2026–present) ====
Member of the Scottish Parliament	Constituency or Region	First elected	Notes
Irshad Ahmed	Edinburgh and Lothians East	2026	
Jackie Baillie	Dumbarton	1999	Deputy Leader of the Scottish Labour Party 2020–, Acting Leader of Scottish Labour 2014, 2017, 2021, Minister for Social Justice 2000–2001
Claire Baker	Mid Scotland and Fife	2007	
Neil Bibby	West Scotland	2011	Chief Whip of the Scottish Labour Party 2014–2016
Katy Clark	West Scotland	2021	MP for North Ayrshire and Arran 2005–2015
Joe Fagan	South Scotland	2026	
Mark Griffin	Central Scotland and Lothians West	2011	Member for Central Scotland 2011–2026
Daniel Johnson	Edinburgh Southern	2016	
Monica Lennon	Glasgow	2016	Member for Central Scotland 2016–2026
Joe Long	Mid Scotland and Fife	2026	
Donald MacKinnon	Na h-Eileanan an Iar	2026	
Michael Marra	North East Scotland	2021	
Pauline McNeill	Glasgow	1999	Member for Glasgow Kelvin 1999–2011, Glasgow 2016–
Carol Mochan	South Scotland	2021	
Katherine Sangster	Edinburgh and Lothians East	2026	
Paul Sweeney	Glasgow	2021	MP for Glasgow North East 2017–2019
Jenny Young	Central Scotland and Lothians West	2026	

== Appointments ==
=== House of Lords ===
Date ennobled	Name	Title
1987	Derry Irvine	Baron Irvine of Lairg
1994	Helen Liddell	Baroness Liddell of Coatdyke
1996	Meta Ramsay	Baroness Ramsay of Cartvale
1997	Charlie Falconer	Baron Falconer of Thoroton
1997	Helena Kennedy	Baroness Kennedy of The Shaws
1997	Mike Watson	Baron Watson of Invergowrie
1997	Barbara Young	Baroness Young of Old Scone
2000	George Robertson	Baron Robertson of Port Ellen
2005	Irene Adams	Baroness Adams of Craigielea
2005	George Foulkes	Baron Foulkes of Cumnock
2006	Neil Davidson	Baron Davidson of Glen Clova
2010	Des Browne	Baron Browne of Ladyton
2010	Jack McConnell	Baron McConnell of Glenscorrodale
2010	John Reid	Baron Reid of Cardowan
2010	Wilf Stevenson	Baron Stevenson of Balmacara
2013	Willie Haughey	Baron Haughey
2018	Pauline Bryan	Baroness Bryan of Partick
2018	Iain McNicol	Baron McNicol of West Kilbride
2024	Ayesha Hazarika	Baroness Hazarika
2024	Catherine Smith	Baroness Smith of Cluny
2025	Margaret Curran	Baroness Curran
2025	Wendy Alexander	Baroness Alexander of Cleveden

== Electoral performance ==
=== House of Commons ===
Red indicates the seats won by Labour at the 2024 United Kingdom general election in Scotland.

Election	Leader		Scotland					Government
Election	(Scotland)	(United Kingdom)	Votes	%	Seats	+/–	Pos.	Government
Jan 1910		Arthur Henderson	37,852	5.1	2 / 70	Steady	3rd	Opposition
Dec 1910		George Barnes	24,633	3.6	3 / 70	▲1	3rd	Opposition
1918		William Adamson	265,744	22.9	6 / 71	▲3	▼4th	Opposition
1922		J. R. Clynes	501,254	32.2	29 / 71	▲23	▲1st	Opposition
1923		Ramsay MacDonald	532,450	35.9	34 / 71	▲5	1st	Minority
1924		Ramsay MacDonald	697,146	41.1	26 / 71	▼8	▼2nd	Opposition
1929		Ramsay MacDonald	931,432	42.3	36 / 71	▲10	▲1st	Minority
1931		Arthur Henderson	696,248	32.6	7 / 71	▼29	▼4th	Opposition
1935		Clement Attlee	863,789	36.8	20 / 71	▲13	▲2nd	Opposition
1945		Clement Attlee	1,144,310	47.9	37 / 71	▲17	▲1st	Majority
1950		Clement Attlee	1,259,410	46.2	37 / 71	Steady	1st	Majority
1951		Clement Attlee	1,330,244	47.9	35 / 71	▼2	▼2nd	Opposition
1955		Clement Attlee	1,188,058	46.7	34 / 71	▼1	2nd	Opposition
1959		Hugh Gaitskell	1,245,255	46.7	38 / 71	▲4	▲1st	Opposition
1964		Harold Wilson	1,283,667	48.7	43 / 71	▲5	1st	Majority
1966		Harold Wilson	1,273,916	49.8	46 / 71	▲3	1st	Majority
1970		Harold Wilson	1,197,068	44.5	44 / 71	▼2	1st	Opposition
Feb 1974		Harold Wilson	1,057,601	36.6	40 / 71	▼4	1st	Minority
Oct 1974		Harold Wilson	1,000,581	36.3	41 / 71	▲1	1st	Majority
1979		James Callaghan	1,211,455	41.6	44 / 71	▲3	1st	Opposition
1983		Michael Foot	990,654	35.1	41 / 72	▼3	1st	Opposition
1987		Neil Kinnock	1,258,132	42.4	50 / 72	▲9	1st	Opposition
1992		Neil Kinnock	1,142,911	39.0	49 / 72	▼1	1st	Opposition
1997		Tony Blair	1,283,350	45.6	56 / 72	▲7	1st	Majority
2001	Henry McLeish	Tony Blair	1,001,173	43.3	56 / 72	Steady	1st	Majority
2005	Jack McConnell	Tony Blair	922,402	39.5	41 / 59	▼15	1st	Majority
2010	Iain Gray	Gordon Brown	1,035,528	42.0	41 / 59	Steady	1st	Opposition
2015	Jim Murphy	Ed Miliband	707,147	24.3	1 / 59	▼40	▼2nd	Opposition
2017	Kezia Dugdale	Jeremy Corbyn	717,007	27.1	7 / 59	▲6	▼3rd	Opposition
2019	Richard Leonard	Jeremy Corbyn	511,838	18.6	1 / 59	▼6	▼4th	Opposition
2024	Anas Sarwar	Keir Starmer	851,897	35.3	37 / 57	▲36	▲1st	Majority

=== Scottish Parliament ===
Red indicates seats won by Labour at the 2021 Scottish Parliament election.

Election	Leader	Constituency			Regional			Total seats	+/–	Pos.	Government
Election	Leader	Votes	%	Seats	Votes	%	Seats	Total seats	+/–	Pos.	Government
1999	Donald Dewar	908,346	38.8	53 / 73	786,818	33.6	3 / 56	56 / 129	N/A	1st	Lab–LD
2003	Jack McConnell	663,585	34.6	46 / 73	561,375	29.3	4 / 56	50 / 129	▼6	1st	Lab–LD
2007	Jack McConnell	648,374	32.1	37 / 73	595,415	29.2	9 / 56	46 / 129	▼4	▼2nd	Opposition
2011	Iain Gray	630,461	31.7	15 / 73	523,469	26.3	22 / 56	37 / 129	▼9	2nd	Opposition
2016	Kezia Dugdale	514,261	22.6	3 / 73	435,919	19.1	21 / 56	24 / 129	▼13	▼3rd	Opposition
2021	Anas Sarwar	584,392	21.6	2 / 73	485,819	17.9	20 / 56	22 / 129	▼2	3rd	Opposition
2026	Anas Sarwar	440,708	19.2	3 / 73	368,785	16.0	14 / 56	17 / 129	▼5	▲2nd (Note: Joint with Reform UK Scotland)	Opposition

=== Local councils ===
The Local Government (Scotland) Act 1973 established a two-tier system of regions and districts (except in the islands, which were given unitary, all-purpose councils). It replaced the counties, burghs, and districts established by the Local Government (Scotland) Act 1947, which were largely based on units of local government dating from the Middle Ages.

District councils					Regional and island councils				
Election	Votes		Seats	Councils	Election	Votes		Seats	Councils
Election	%	Pos.	Seats	Councils	Election	%	Pos.	Seats	Councils
1974	38.4	1st	428 / 1,158	15 / 53	1974	38.5	1st	172 / 524	3 / 12
1977	31.6	1st	282 / 1,158	6 / 53	1978	39.6	1st	176 / 524	4 / 12
1980	45.4	1st	469 / 1,158	25 / 53	1982	37.6	1st	186 / 524	3 / 12
1984	45.7	1st	545 / 1,158	25 / 53	1986	43.9	1st	223 / 524	4 / 12
1988	42.6	1st	553 / 1,158	23 / 53	1990	44.0	1st	223 / 524	4 / 12
1992	34.0	1st	468 / 1,158	19 / 53	1994	41.8	1st	220 / 453	4 / 12

2022 local election results in Scotland where red represents Labour.

The two-tier system of local government lasted until 1 April 1996 when the Local Government etc. (Scotland) Act 1994 came into effect, abolishing the regions and districts and replacing them with 32 unitary authorities. Elections for the new mainland unitary authorities were first contested in 1995. The Local Governance (Scotland) Act 2004 switched the electoral system for Scottish local elections from first past the post (FPTP) to single transferable vote (STV), beginning in 2007.

Election	Leader	1st Pref Votes		Councillors		Councils		Pos.	
Election	Leader	Votes	%	Seats	+/-	Majorities	+/-	Pos.	
1995 (Note: The three island regional councils (Orkney, Shetland and the Western Isles) were retained from the previous two-tier system of local government. These councils did not take part in the 1995 election, having held local elections in 1994.)		742,557	43.6	613 / 1,155	N/A	21 / 29	N/A	1st	
1999		Donald Dewar	829,921	36.6	550 / 1,222	▼63	16 / 32	▼5	1st
2003		Jack McConnell	611,843	32.6	509 / 1,222	▼41	12 / 32	▼4	1st
2007		Jack McConnell	590,085	28.1	348 / 1,222	▼161	2 / 32	▼10	▼2nd
2012	Johann Lamont	488,703	31.4	394 / 1,223	▲46	4 / 32	▲2	2nd	
2017	Kezia Dugdale	380,957	20.2	262 / 1,227	▼133	0 / 32	▼4	▼3rd	
2022	Anas Sarwar	403,243	21.7	282 / 1,226	▲20	1 / 32	▲1	▲2nd	

=== European Parliament ===
Scottish Labour failed to win a plurality of the votes in any council area at the 2019 European Parliament election in Scotland.

During the United Kingdom's membership of the European Union (1973–2020), Scotland participated in European Parliament elections, held every five years from 1979 until 2019. Elections between 1979 and 1994 were contested under the first past the post (FPTP) electoral system. The European Parliamentary Elections Act 1999 introduced a closed-list party list system method of proportional representation and a single Scotland-wide electoral region, which came into effect in 1999.

Election	Group	Leader		Scotland				
Election	Group	(Scotland)	(United Kingdom)	Votes	%	Seats	+/–	Pos.
1979	PES		James Callaghan	421,968	33.0	2 / 8	N/A	2nd
1984	PES		Neil Kinnock	526,066	41.0	5 / 8	▲3	▲1st
1989	PES		Neil Kinnock	664,263	41.9	7 / 8	▲2	1st
1994	PES		John Smith	635,955	42.5	6 / 8	▼1	1st
1999	PES	Donald Dewar	Tony Blair	283,490	28.7	3 / 8	▼3	1st
2004	PES	Jack McConnell	Tony Blair	310,865	26.4	2 / 7	▼1	1st
2009	S&D	Iain Gray	Gordon Brown	229,853	20.8	2 / 6	Steady	▼2nd
2014	S&D	Johann Lamont	Ed Miliband	348,219	25.9	2 / 6	Steady	2nd
2019	S&D	Richard Leonard	Jeremy Corbyn	146,724	9.3	0 / 6	▼2	▼5th

== See also ==
- Campaign for Socialism
