= Pauline Bryan, Baroness Bryan of Partick =

Scottish socialist

The Right Honourable The Baroness Bryan of Partick
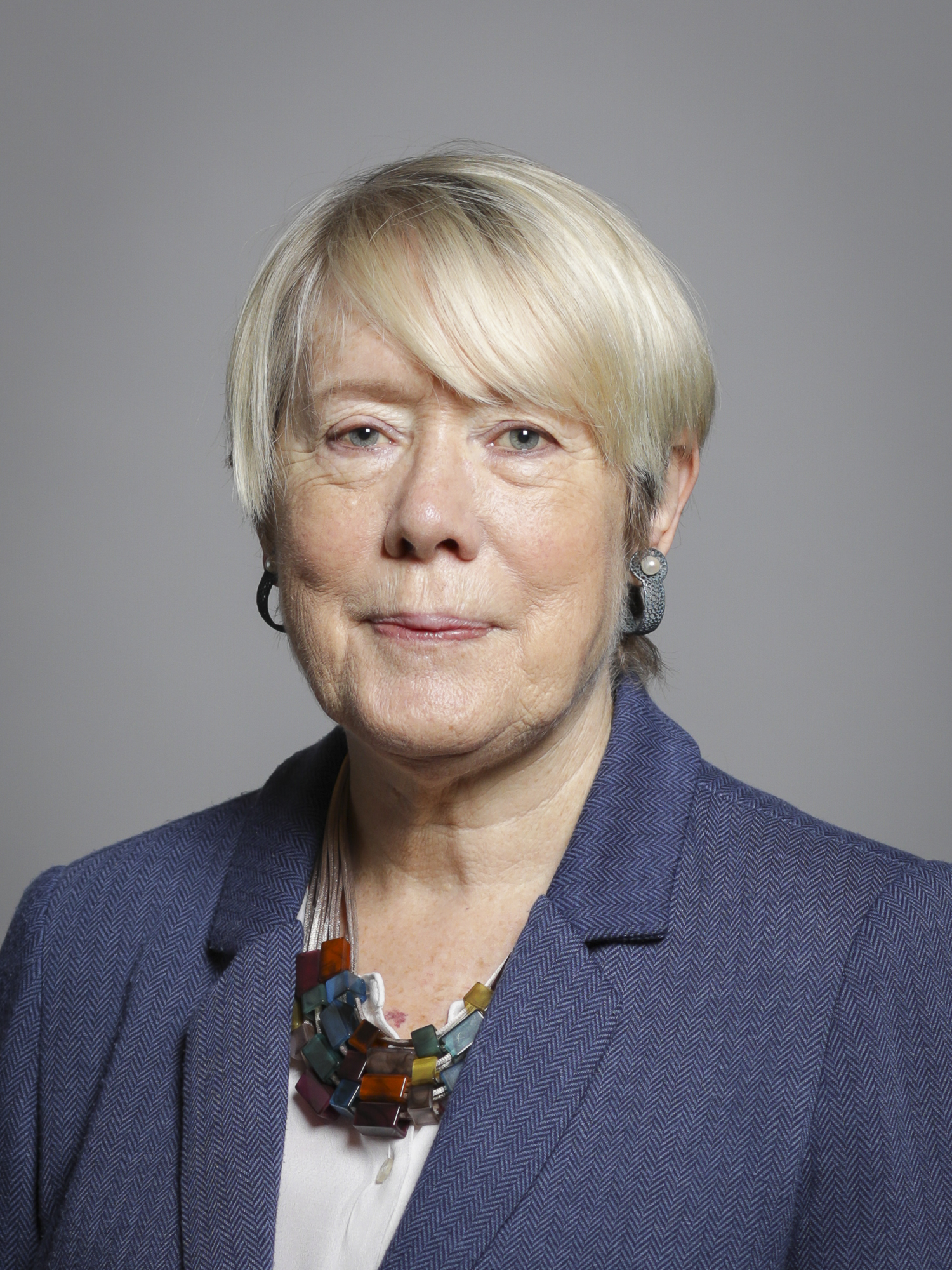
- Bryan in 2019

Member of the House of Lords
- Lord Temporal
- Life peerage 20 June 2018 – 25 July 2025

Personal details
- Born: 3 January 1950 (age 76)
- Party: Labour

Pauline Christina Bryan, Baroness Bryan of Partick (born 3 January 1950) is a Scottish writer and socialist campaigner. She was nominated for a life peerage by the Leader of the Labour Party, Jeremy Corbyn, in May 2018. On 20 June, she was created Baroness Bryan of Partick, of Partick in the City of Glasgow.

== Career ==
Bryan is part of the Red Paper Collective, a group of Labour activists who aim to provide an alternative from the perspective of the Labour movement to the "sterile nationalist v unionist debate" around the Scottish independence referendums. Bryan reviewed Neil Findlay's book about his bid for the leadership of the Scottish Labour Party, Socialism & Hope: A Journey Through Turbulent Times, for the Morning Star in 2017. In her review Bryan wrote that the election of Jeremy Corbyn as leader of the Labour Party "was a lifeline for the left. It rebuilt friendships and enthusiasm. ... By the 2017 election, we saw the beginnings of a renewed Scottish Labour Party and a renewed activist base who, regardless of what their MPs and MSPs thought, were committing themselves to a radical Labour Party".

Bryan is a founding member of the Keir Hardie Society, and was the editor of the 2015 book What Would Keir Hardie Say?. She is also a founding member of the Campaign for Socialism.

In October 2023, Bryan and eight others resigned from the executive board of the Glasgow Kelvin Constituency Labour Party following the comments of Keir Starmer on the Gaza war. The councillors resigned because a motion submitted to the Glasgow Kelvin Labour party was ruled "out of order and should not be debated at party meetings". This was after "Labour Officials" wrote CLP's stating that "any motions" about Gaza would be "out of order and should not be debated at party meetings". The motion called for the cessation of Israeli military action, but made no mention of the cessation of violence action by Hamas, Hezbollah, Islamic Jihad or Israeli settlers.

Bryan retired from the House of Lords on 25 July 2025.
