= Joe Fagan (politician) =

Scottish politician

Joe Fagan MSP
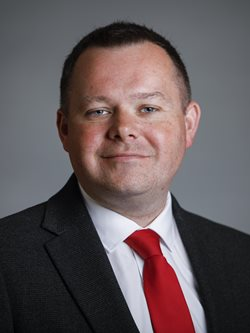
- Official portrait, 2026

Member of the Scottish Parliament for South Scotland (1 of 7 Regional MSPs)
- Incumbent
- Assumed office 7 May 2026
- Preceded by: Multi-member constituency

Leader of South Lanarkshire Council
- In office 18 May 2022 – 27 May 2026
- Preceded by: John Ross
- Succeeded by: Maureen Devlin

Personal details
- Born: 1987 (age 38–39) Lanarkshire, Scotland
- Party: Scottish Labour
- Education: University of Strathclyde

Joe Fagan (born 1987) is a Scottish politician who has served as a Member of the Scottish Parliament for South Scotland since May 2026. He is a member of Scottish Labour. In 2026, Fagan unsuccessfully stood in the contest to replace Anas Sarwar as leader of Scottish Labour.

== Biography ==
Joe was born in Lanarkshire in 1987 and is a lifelong resident of East Kilbride. While growing up in the town, he worked in retail and was a founding member of the East Kilbride Fairtrade Group. He graduated from the University of Strathclyde in 2009 and entered elected politics in 2017 as a local councillor for East Kilbride Central North.

In 2022, Fagan became leader of South Lanarkshire Council. In the 2026 Scottish Parliament election, Fagan stood as the Labour candidate in East Kilbride, placing second. Fagan was elected on the regional ballot in South Scotland. Fagan was succeeded as leader of South Lanarkshire Council by Maureen Devlin.

== Leader of South Lanarkshire Council ==
Following the 2022 local elections, in which no party won a majority, Fagan was elected Leader of South Lanarkshire Council on 18 May 2022, heading the first Labour-led administration of the council since 2017. The administration was formed through a partnership agreement between the Labour and Liberal Democrat groups, with the support of the Independent group, and was approved by 35 votes to 28. Fagan described it as "a new kind of administration, Labour-led but not Labour-only". Independent councillor Margaret Cooper, a former Labour councillor who had left the party in 2017, was elected Provost under the new administration. Liberal Democrat group leader Robert Brown served as chair of the council's Community and Enterprise Resources committee. The partnership administration remained in office for the full council term.

In June 2022, Fagan was criticised by Monique McAdams, a fellow Labour councillor for South Lanarkshire, for placing her on council committees against her will, after which she subsequently took a leave of absence for sickness. Fagan then criticised her for openly questioning his decisions in public.

Fagan's administration allocated funding for a replacement Larkhall Leisure Centre, introduced free public swimming sessions for residents under the age of 16, and oversaw town centre master plans for East Kilbride and Hamilton. Fagan also established South Lanarkshire as a Marmot Places pilot program focused on reducing local health inequalities.

As Leader of South Lanarkshire Council, in August 2023, Fagan was suspended for leaking confidential information relating to the funding of council services.

In June 2023, the Standards Commission for Scotland suspended Fagan as a councillor for two months for breaching the Councillors' Code of Conduct by disclosing to the press, before he became leader, a confidential list of leisure facilities reported to be under threat of closure under the previous SNP administration. The panel found that the disclosure was deliberate and motivated at least in part by political gain, but imposed a reduced sanction citing "extensive mitigation", including his full cooperation, his contribution to public life and the absence of dishonesty or previous breaches. Fagan said his conscience was clear and that he had disclosed the information openly and in good faith. He remained council leader and was subsequently selected as Labour's candidate for East Kilbride at the 2026 Scottish Parliament election.

In September 2023, Fagan was criticised in a letter to the Scottish Labour Leader, Anas Sarwar, by a fellow Labour councillor for South Lanarkshire, Mathew Buchanan, for his authoritarian leadership and presiding over a culture of intimidation.

In December 2025, Fagan said the council had passed a budget increasing investment by £55 million while maintaining the lowest council tax rate in Scotland. In January 2026 he signed the South Lanarkshire Third Sector Partnership Agreement, described by Voluntary Action South Lanarkshire as "a major milestone" for the local voluntary sector.

== Member of the Scottish Parliament ==
At the 2026 Scottish Parliament election, Fagan stood as the Labour candidate in East Kilbride, placed second, and was elected on the regional list for South Scotland. He announced he would step down as council leader while serving out his term as a councillor, and chose to forego the full leader's salary during the transition to his successor.
