= Anas Sarwar =

Scottish politician (born 1983)

The Right Honourable The Lord Sarwar
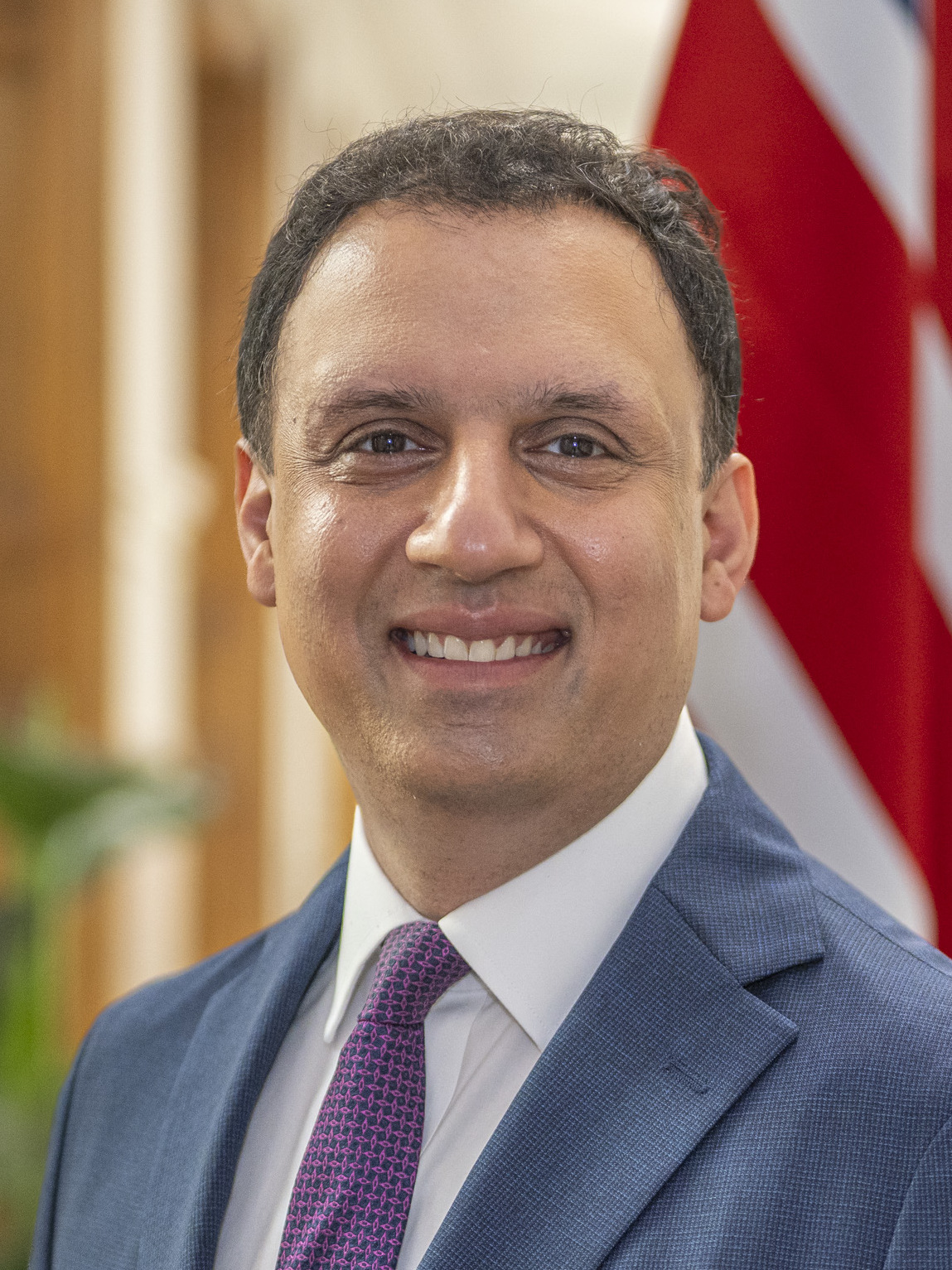
- Official portrait, 2026

Minister of State for Trade
- Incumbent
- Assumed office 22 July 2026
- Prime Minister: Andy Burnham
- Preceded by: Chris Bryant

Shadow Minister for International Development
- In office 5 November 2014 – 8 May 2015
- Leader: Ed Miliband
- Preceded by: Alison McGovern
- Succeeded by: Mike Kane
Party political offices
Leader of the Scottish Labour Party
In office 27 February 2021 – 23 July 2026
Deputy	Jackie Baillie
UK party leader	Keir Starmer; Andy Burnham
Preceded by	Richard Leonard (Note: Jackie Baillie acted from 14 January to 27 February 2021)
Succeeded by	Michael Marra (Note: Jackie Baillie acted from 23 July to 19 September 2026)
Acting; 24 October 2014 – 13 December 2014
UK party leader	Ed Miliband
Preceded by	Johann Lamont
Succeeded by	Jim Murphy
Deputy Leader of the Scottish Labour Party
In office 17 December 2011 – 13 December 2014
Leader	Johann Lamont
Preceded by	Johann Lamont
Succeeded by	Kezia Dugdale
Scottish Labour portfolios
2016–2018	Shadow Cabinet Secretary for Health and Sport
2020–2021	Shadow Cabinet Secretary for the Constitution
Parliamentary offices
Member of the House of Lords
Lord Temporal
Life peerage 24 August 2026
Member of the Scottish Parliament for Glasgow (1 of 7 Regional MSPs)
In office 5 May 2016 – 23 July 2026
Preceded by	Multi-member constituency
Succeeded by	Monica Lennon
Member of Parliament for Glasgow Central
In office 6 May 2010 – 30 March 2015
Preceded by	Mohammad Sarwar
Succeeded by	Alison Thewliss

Personal details
- Born: Anas Sarwar; 14 March 1983 (age 43) Glasgow, Scotland
- Party: Labour Co-op
- Spouse: Furheen Ashrif (m. 2006)
- Children: 3
- Relatives: Mohammad Sarwar (father)
- Education: University of Glasgow (BDS)
- Website: anassarwar.co.uk

Anas Sarwar, Baron Sarwar (born 14 March 1983) is a Scottish Labour and Co-operative politician who has served as Minister of State for Trade since July 2026, having previously served as Leader of the Scottish Labour Party from 2021 to 2026. He was the Member of Parliament (MP) for Glasgow Central from 2010 to 2015, when he lost his seat to the SNP's Alison Thewliss and then a regional Member of the Scottish Parliament (MSP) for Glasgow from 2016 to 2026.

Born in Glasgow to British-Pakistani Muslim parents, Sarwar was privately educated at Hutchesons' Grammar School and studied general dentistry at the University of Glasgow. He worked in Paisley as a dentist until being elected as the MP for Glasgow Central at the 2010 general election when he succeeded his retiring father, Mohammad Sarwar. During his time in the House of Commons he served as Deputy Leader of the Scottish Labour Party from 2011 to 2014.

Sarwar lost his seat to the Scottish National Party (SNP) at the 2015 general election. He was elected at the 2016 Scottish Parliament election on the Glasgow regional list. Having been defeated at the 2017 Scottish Labour leadership election by Richard Leonard, he was elected as Leader of the Scottish Labour Party in the 2021 leadership election. Sarwar led Scottish Labour into the 2021 Scottish Parliament election, which saw Scottish Labour remain in opposition with two fewer Labour MSPs than at the previous election. He was defeated by the incumbent first minister, Nicola Sturgeon, in Glasgow Southside but was returned on the Glasgow regional list.

At the 2024 United Kingdom general election Labour won with a landslide victory, winning 411 seats across the United Kingdom, with Scottish Labour winning 37 of the 57 Scottish seats in what was also considered a landslide. Sarwar led Scottish Labour into the 2026 Scottish Parliament election, standing for the new Glasgow Cathcart and Pollok constituency. He was defeated by the SNP's Zen Ghani, a 24 year-old candidate, but was re-elected as a Glasgow regional list MSP. He stood down as an MSP and Labour leader in July 2026 to serve as Minister of State for Trade in the Burnham ministry.

== Early life and career ==
Anas Sarwar was born on 14 March 1983 in Glasgow, the youngest of four children. His parents were Perveen Sarwar and Chaudhry Sarwar, who himself was a UK and Pakistani politician who represented Glasgow Central in the UK House of Commons from 1997 to 2010 and also served as the 38th and 40th Governor of Punjab, Pakistan, from 2013 to 2015 and from 2018 to 2022. He attended Hutchesons' Grammar School, a private school in Glasgow, before completing a degree in general dentistry at the University of Glasgow from 2000 to 2005. While a student, he joined marches against the Iraq War. He worked as an NHS dentist in Paisley from 2005 until 2009.

== Early political career ==
Sarwar began campaigning for the Labour Party as a child of "nine or ten" and joined the party at the age of fifteen or sixteen. His father was elected as the Labour MP for Glasgow Govan in 1997, becoming the UK's first Muslim MP. In that year, Sarwar received an envelope containing a threat against his mother. Sarwar served as an executive member of Scottish Young Labour and later joined the Co-operative Party, a party which stands candidates jointly with the Labour Party, as well as the Fabian Society, the trades unions Unite and Community, and the pressure group Progress. He served as vice-chair of Progress in 2011.

Sarwar was selected as the lead regional list candidate for the Glasgow Scottish Parliament electoral region for the 2007 election. He was a member of Labour's Scottish Policy Forum which was responsible for drawing-up the Scottish Labour Party manifesto for that election. He was not elected, later saying that standing as a list candidate had been a chance "to prove himself", and that he had had "no chance" of success given his party's success in winning constituency seats under the additional member system.

== Member of Parliament (2010–2015) ==
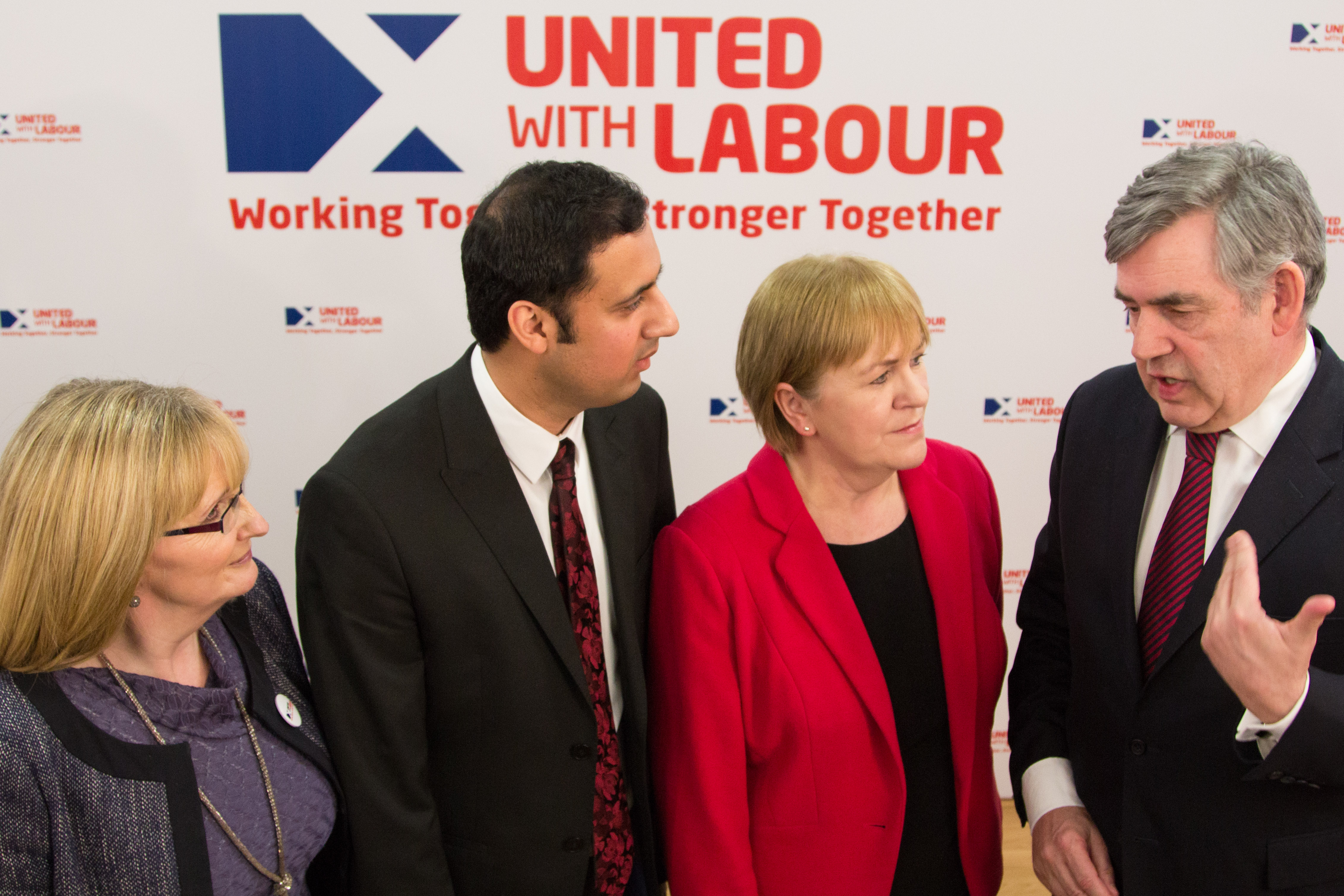
Margaret Curran, Anas Sarwar, Johann Lamont and Gordon Brown at the launch of United with Labour

Sarwar's father announced his retirement as the MP for Glasgow Central in February 2007. Later that year, Sarwar was selected as the Labour candidate for the seat at the 2010 general election. Despite Labour's loss of power at that general election, Anas Sarwar emphasised his independence and differentiated himself from his father's politics. The Guardian described him as positioning himself on the "moderate left" of the Labour Party, supporting electoral reform for the House of Commons, reforming the House of Lords to have a majority of elected seats but with some seats remaining appointed, and reducing the scale of the UK's nuclear deterrent. He opposed privatisation of the NHS but supported the use of private finance initiative schemes to build schools. He won the election with 52.0% of the vote, an increase on the previous vote share and majority.

He was elected by colleagues to serve on the International Development Select Committee. He said that his parliamentary interests included foreign policy and international development, and that he wanted to "use his parliamentary platform to make a difference on" conflicts in Palestine and Kashmir. In December 2011, Sarwar was elected as Deputy Leader of the Scottish Labour Party receiving 51.1% of the vote. In January 2013, he was awarded the Politician of The Year Award at the British Muslim Awards. In 2013, Sarwar took a strong line in attacking both the "bedroom tax" and accused the Scottish Government of failure to mitigate its worst effects. During a vote on its repeal, Sarwar was overseas in Pakistan, giving a speech to students at Hajvery University, and so was paired with a Conservative MP, cancelling out the two votes. He was criticised for his absence by the Scottish National Party. In 2014, Sarwar was criticised by SNP politicians for sending his son to Hutchesons' Grammar School, a private school and the same school that he himself attended, instead of a state school.

From November 2014 until May 2015, Sarwar served as Shadow Minister for International Development. In January 2015, he was awarded the Spirit of Britain Award at that year's British Muslim Awards.

In 2012, he was appointed to co-ordinate Scottish Labour's 2014 Scottish independence referendum campaign. The campaign, alongside Better Together, was successful, with 55% of the electorate of Scotland voting to stay in the United Kingdom. The Leader of the Scottish Labour Party, Johann Lamont, resigned from the position on 25 October 2014, criticising the attitude of the Labour Party as a whole to the Scottish Labour Party and saying that Scottish Labour needed to be more autonomous. The Guardian reported that she felt like she needed to resign after the general secretary of Scottish Labour, Ian Price, was "removed from office without her being consulted". Several Scottish Labour figures echoed her frustrations. Sarwar defended the UK-wide Labour Party, and said that Price "resigned from his position as general secretary and I think we should respect his position". Following the resignation of Johann Lamont on 25 October 2014, Sarwar became acting leader until the new leader, Jim Murphy, was elected. On 30 October, he announced his resignation as deputy leader. At the 2015 general election, Sarwar lost his seat to Alison Thewliss of the SNP. Following that election, in what was a historic defeat for Labour, they were left with a single seat (Edinburgh South) after half a century of political domination of Scottish seats at Westminster.

== Member of the Scottish Parliament (2016–2026) ==
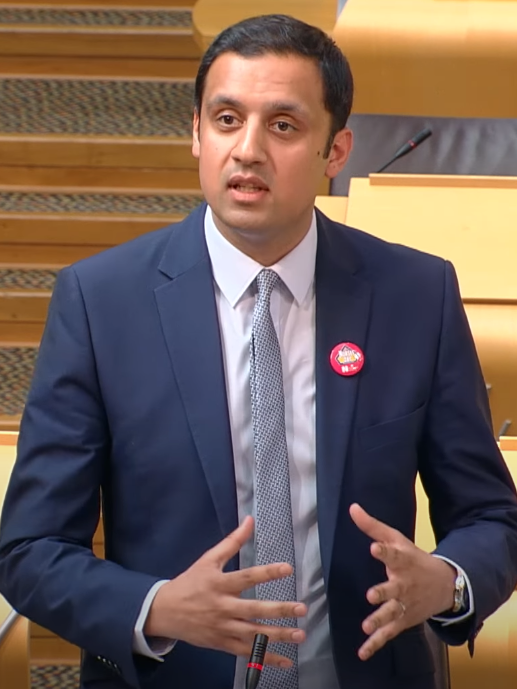
Sarwar in the Scottish Parliament chamber, 2017

Sarwar was elected as an additional member in the 2016 Scottish Parliament election for the Glasgow region. In 2016, he was appointed as Scottish Labour's spokesperson for health and sport. Sarwar was opposed to leaving the European Union and said that the UK needed to stay in the single market in order to counter the Conservatives' austerity policies. However, on BBC Radio 4 in April 2023 Sarwar, while expressing hope that Labour would do well in 2024 in the wake of the SNP's troubles, ruled out any plan to rejoin the EU, or to join its single market, or to join its customs union. He sought advice from the police after creating a working group on Islamophobia.

In September 2017, he announced he would run for the Scottish Labour leadership following the resignation of Kezia Dugdale. He was characterised by opponents as being on the right of the Labour Party and a Blairite, which he repudiated, describing himself as a Brownite. He called the Iraq War "the worst foreign policy decision in my lifetime". He expressed support for UK-wide Labour leader Jeremy Corbyn's policies of "a £10 national living wage, public ownership of the railways, higher taxation for the rich and tougher laws on basic wages and employment rights". He proposed a tax rate of 50p for earnings over £100,000 and cuts to income tax for earnings under £28,000, including a new 15p tax rate for lower earners. His campaign emphasised equality over discussions of independence. He defended sending his children to a private school, saying he and his wife had done what they "thought was best for [their] children". Sarwar was criticised by opponents after it emerged that his family firm was advertising job vacancies with pay below the recommended living wage. His opponent in the election, Richard Leonard, was on the left wing of the Labour Party. Leonard won the election with 56.7% of the vote. During the 2017 leadership election, Rutherglen councillor Davie McLachlan allegedly said "Scotland wouldn't vote for a brown Muslim Paki". In April 2019, Sarwar's case against McLachlan was due to be heard by the National Constitutional Committee but was dropped on a technicality, as Sarwar had not given his case within the required timescale. Leonard acknowledged the process was flawed and the committee would need to be reformed to avoid similar incidents.

Sarwar was replaced as health and sport spokesperson by Monica Lennon in October 2018. He said he had only learnt of the sacking on the social media platform Twitter. In November 2019, Sarwar was given access to a leaked report from 2015 which had considered infection controls at Queen Elizabeth University Hospital to be at "high risk". Ten-year-old patient Milly Main died in the hospital in 2017 from a water infection, while she was there to recover from leukaemia. Sarwar raised the leaked report's findings in a Scottish Parliament debate in which he criticised NHS Greater Glasgow and Clyde for not closing certain hospital wards despite the report's findings. He requested on behalf of Main's mother, a constituent of his, a response from the first minister Nicola Sturgeon. In November 2020, Sarwar was appointed as Scottish Labour's spokesperson for the constitution.

=== Leader of the Labour Party in Scotland ===
==== Campaign and election ====
Following the resignation of Richard Leonard in 2021, Sarwar was elected as leader of the Scottish Labour Party, winning 57.6% of the vote to Monica Lennon's 42.4%. The Guardian described him as a centrist. Despite having criticised Corbyn in the past, Sarwar insisted that his economic plans would be "even more progressive and radical" than those of Corbyn and the former shadow chancellor John McDonnell. Sarwar and some reporters said this made him the first ethnic minority person to lead a major UK political party, although The Spectator pointed to political leaders of Jewish descent such as Benjamin Disraeli, Michael Howard and Ed Miliband whilst acknowledging he was the first Muslim and person of Asian descent.

==== In the Scottish Parliament ====
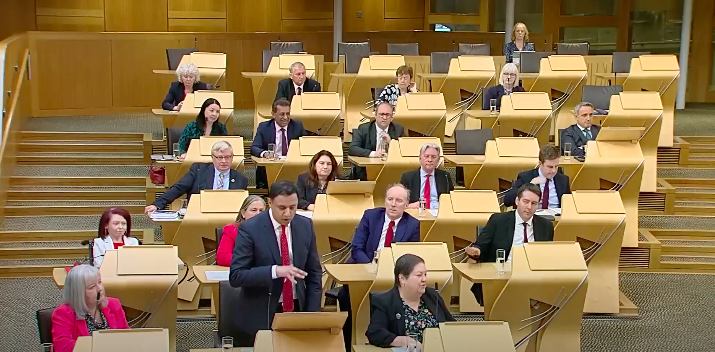
Sarwar during First Minister's Questions as Scottish Labour leader, June 2024

The leader of the Scottish Conservatives, Douglas Ross, proposed a coalition of parties supporting Scotland remaining in the United Kingdom, which Sarwar rejected. Sarwar called the United Kingdom "fundamentally broken", and said that there should be more devolution of power from Westminster to Holyrood, and from Holyrood to communities. He also confirmed Scottish Labour's opposition to renewing the Trident nuclear programme.

As the leader of Scottish Labour in the run-up to the 2021 Scottish Parliament election, Sarwar pledged to reduce poverty and inequality in Scotland as part of his policy solutions to the aftermath of COVID-19 crisis. In the run-up to the election, the Labour Party removed Hollie Cameron, a Labour candidate who said in an interview that Labour would support a second referendum on Scottish independence depending on timing, contrary to the party's policy. Sarwar was criticised for the decision by figures on the left of the Labour Party.

In March 2022, Sarwar announced a policy of providing free residential care and free home care, alongside increasing care workers' wages to a minimum of £15 an hour. Sarwar supports replacing the House of Lords with an elected senate that would represent nations and regions. In November 2022, Declassified UK said that Sarwar was a member of the lobbying group British-American Project. In the same month, in an interview with The Times, he talked about the need for growth in order to deliver policies that improve equality and reduce poverty.

During the Gaza war, Sarwar called for an immediate ceasefire, a policy at odds with that of UK-wide Labour leader Keir Starmer.

==== 2021 Scottish Parliament election ====
Sarwar himself stood as both a list candidate and as constituency candidate for Glasgow Southside, which the First Minister, Nicola Sturgeon, represented. The election saw the worst result for Scottish Labour since devolution, with two fewer Labour MSPs returned than at the previous election. Although he was defeated by the incumbent First Minister, Nicola Sturgeon, in Glasgow Southside, he was re-elected as a list MSP. Sarwar stood as a Scottish Labour and Co-operative candidate for the first time in this election.

Following the election, Scottish Labour became the third largest party in the Scottish Parliament, behind the Scottish National Party who formed the government, and the Scottish Conservatives who became the second largest party in parliament. In the 2021 election, Scottish Labour won 22 out of 129 seats.

==== Labour independence supporters ====
In January 2022, it was reported that the UK-wide Labour leader Keir Starmer was interested in allowing more supporters of independence to stand as Labour candidates. Sarwar said that candidates would need to stand on a platform of Scotland remaining in the UK, and that "when it comes to Scottish Labour, I'm in charge".

==== 2024 UK general election ====
At the 2024 United Kingdom general election, Labour won with a landslide victory, winning 411 seats across the United Kingdom, with Scottish Labour winning 37 of the 57 Scottish seats in what was also considered a landslide. Sarwar said "this is a historic day for Scotland and for the entire UK. People are waking up to the news that after 14 years of Conservative government, after 14 years of chaos and division, it has come to an end and Scotland and the UK has elected a Labour government".

==== 2026 Scottish Parliament election ====
Sarwar led his party into the 2026 Scottish Parliament election, standing as the Scottish Labour candidate for the new Glasgow Cathcart and Pollok constituency. On 9 February 2026, Sarwar held a press conference in Glasgow to publicly call for Starmer to resign. Sarwar stated that "the distraction needs to end and the leadership in Downing Street has to change," citing a series of "mistakes" that he believed were undermining Labour's prospects in the forthcoming elections. Sarwar described Starmer as a "decent man" and a "friend", but argued that his primary loyalty was to Scotland and that Starmer's continued leadership was sabotaging the party's future. Starmer resigned months later in July 2026, and was succeeded by Andy Burnham; Sarwar attended Burnham's first press conference as Labour leader.

In March 2026, Sarwar apologised after laughingly asking photographers whether they had photographed his 'stroke pose' during a press conference. When told the event was still being filmed, he responded, "Oh is it? You're not going to use that Neil, come on." Chest Heart and Stroke Scotland condemned the comments, said they diminished the experiences of stroke survivors and demanded an urgent meeting with Sarwar. During FMQs, Swinney said: “I think people in Scotland will be pretty sceptical about the things that Mr Sarwar says in here and the commitments he gives because we saw the real side of Mr Sarwar in his flippant and disrespectful comments about those who suffer strokes in our society, yesterday. Mr Sarwar should do the decent thing and apologise in his own words.”

At the election on 8 May, Sarwar was defeated in Glasgow Cathcart and Pollok by the SNP's Zen Ghani, who received 14,270 votes (44.3%) to Sarwar's 9,107 (28.3%). Sarwar was subsequently re-elected as a Glasgow regional list MSP.

== Minister for Trade (2026–present) ==
Following the 2026 Scottish Parliament results, Sarwar said he intended to continue serving as leader, but resigned two months later to take up a ministerial role in the Burnham ministry, triggering the 2026 Scottish Labour leadership election. He was appointed Minister of State for Trade on 22 July by Andy Burnham and was given a life peerage. He resigned his seat in the Scottish Parliament on 23 July 2026 and was created as Baron Sarwar, of Maxwell Park in the City of Glasgow on 24 August 2026.. His successor Michael Marra was elected Scottish Labour Leader on 19 September 2026.

== Personal life ==
Sarwar is married to Furheen Sarwar, who works as an NHS dentist. The couple have three children. He owns a quarter share of his family's cash-and-carry wholesale business; his share was valued in 2016 as worth between £2.7 million and £4.8 million. In September 2017, Sarwar transferred his shareholding to a discretionary trust for the benefit of his three children, so that he could not personally access the assets or dividends.

He is the president of the Sarwar Foundation, and is teetotal.

== See also ==
- List of British Pakistanis
- Pakistan–United Kingdom relations

== Notes ==
Parliament of the United Kingdom
Preceded by Mohammad Sarwar	Member of Parliament for Glasgow Central; 2010–2015	Succeeded by Alison Thewliss
Party political offices
Preceded by Johann Lamont	Deputy Leader of the Scottish Labour Party; 2011–2014	Succeeded by Kezia Dugdale
Preceded by Richard Leonard	Leader of the Scottish Labour Party; 2021–2026	Succeeded by Michael Marra
