= Opinion polling for the 2007 Scottish Parliament election =

This is a list of opinion polls for the 2007 Scottish Parliament election. The first figure for each party is for the 1st, first-past-the-post, constituency, vote; the second figure is for the 2nd, proportional representation, regional, vote. The Scottish Greens and the Scottish Socialist Party ran only one constituency candidate each in the 2007 election (the Greens in Glasgow Kelvin and the SSP in Paisley North) so constituency values in polls for those parties have little meaning.

ICM, Ipsos MORI, Populus, YouGov and TNS System Three (a subsidiary of Taylor Nelson Sofres) are all members of the British Polling Council (BPC), and therefore fully disclose the methodology used, and publish tables of the detailed statistical findings. Scottish Opinion (a brand of Progressive Partnership) and mruk are not BPC members.

== Constituency vote ==
View source data.

Pollster/client	Date(s) conducted	Lab	SNP	Con	Lib Dem	SSP	Green	Others
2007 Scottish Parliament election		32.2%	32.9%	16.6%	16.2%	-	-	-
YouGov/The Daily Telegraph	2 May 2007	31%	37%	13%	14%	-	-	5%
ICM/The Guardian/The Scotsman	30 April 2007	32%	34%	13%	16%	-	-	5%
Populus/The Times	30 April 2007	29%	33%	13%	15%	-	-	10%
YouGov/Daily Telegraph	26 April 2007	30%	39%	13%	15%	-	-	4%
YouGov/ESRC	23 April 2007	30%	38%	12%	15%	-	-	-
YouGov/Sunday Times	20 April 2007	30%	37%	14%	15%	-	-	4%
mruk/Herald	19 April 2007	34%	38%	11%	13%	-	-	-
Populus/Times	17 April 2007	30%	34%	13%	18%	-	-	6%
Scottish Opinion/Mail on Sunday	15 April 2007	35%	32%	13%	15%	-	-	-
ICM/Scotsman	3 April 2007	27%	32%	13%	19%	5%	-	4%
TNS System Three/STV	1 April 2007	34%	39%	13%	11%	-	-	3%
YouGov/Daily Telegraph	28 March 2007	29%	35%	13%	14%	-	-	9%
mruk/Herald	27 March 2007	38%	34%	10%	15%	-	-	3%
Scottish Opinion/Daily Mail	26 March 2007	28%	34%	11%	11%	-	9%	-
Populus/Times	25 March 2007	28%	38%	14%	15%	-	-	6%
ICM/Scotsman	26 February 2007	29%	34%	16%	16%	1%	-	-
ICM/Scotsman	29 January 2007	31%	33%	13%	17%	3%	-	3%
YouGov/Sunday Times	12 January 2007	29%	35%	13%	18%	1%	2%	2%
YouGov/Channel 4	8 January 2007	31%	33%	14%	14%	1%	5%	4%
TNS System Three/The Herald	November 2006	35%	32%	11%	14%	4%	3%	2%
ICM/Scotsman	23 November 2006	29%	34%	13%	17%	3%	2%	2%
TNS System Three/The Herald	October 2006	38%	30%	12%	14%	3%	3%	-
ICM/Scotsman	30 October 2006	30%	32%	14%	15%	4%	3%	3%
Scottish Opinion/Sunday Mail	20 October 2006	32%	35%	11%	16%	2%	-	2%
YouGov/Sunday Times	7 September 2006	30%	29%	14%	18%	2%	5%	4%
TNS System Three/Herald (see "SNP blow as poll shows Labour in eight-point lead", 4 September 2006)	29 August 2006	36%	28%	12%	17%	4%	3%	-
TNS System Three/Herald	1 August 2006	37%	29%	13%	14%	3%	2%	-
TNS System Three/Herald	4 July 2006	37%	31%	11%	14%	3%	3%	-
Ipsos MORI	1 July 2006	28%	30%	15%	19%	1%	4%	3%
2003 Scottish Parliament election		34.9%	23.8%	16.5%	15.1%	6.2%	-	3.5%

== Regional vote ==
View source data.

Pollster/client	Date(s) conducted	Lab	SNP	Con	Lib Dem	Green	SSP	Others
2007 Scottish Parliament election		29.2%	31.0%	13.9%	11.3%	4.0%	0.6%	
YouGov/The Daily Telegraph	2 May 2007	27%	32%	13%	10%	9%	-	9%
ICM/The Guardian/The Scotsman	30 April 2007	29%	30%	13%	16%	4%	3%	5%
Populus/The Times	30 April 2007	28%	31%	14%	15%	4%	1%	7%
YouGov/Daily Telegraph	26 April 2007	27%	31%	13%	11%	9%	3%	7%
YouGov/ESRC	23 April 2007	27%	32%	14%	12%	-	-	-
YouGov/The Sunday Times	20 April 2007	28%	35%	13%	13%	-	-	11%
mruk/The Herald	19 April 2007	36%	37%	11%	11%	3%	-	-
Populus/The Times	17 April 2007	27%	34%	14%	18%	3%	1%	3%
Scottish Opinion/Mail on Sunday	15 April 2007	34%	31%	12%	13%	5%	-	-
ICM/Scotsman	3 April 2007	27%	31%	12%	17%	5%	5%	3%
TNS System Three/STV	1 April 2007	25%	36%	11%	13%	6%	3%	7%
YouGov/The Daily Telegraph	28 March 2007	27%	33%	15%	12%	6%	2%	5%
mruk/The Herald	27 March 2007	37%	35%	10%	14%	3%	-	1%
Scottish Opinion/Daily Mail	26 March 2007	28%	32%	10%	11%	10%	-	-
Populus/The Times	25 March 2007	30%	35%	14%	14%	4%	1%	2%
ICM/The Scotsman	26 February 2007	28%	32%	15%	17%	4%	2%	-
ICM/The Scotsman	29 January 2007	27%	33%	14%	17%	5%	3%	2%
YouGov/The Sunday Times	12 January 2007	30%	32%	14%	14%	5%	1%	4%
YouGov/Channel 4	8 January 2007	28%	33%	15%	11%	7%	1%	4%
TNS System Three/The Herald	November 2006	32%	30%	11%	15%	5%	4%	3%
ICM/Scotsman	23 November 2006	26%	31%	12%	19%	6%	4%	2%
TNS System Three/The Herald	October 2006	30%	33%	9%	17%	6%	4%	-
ICM/Scotsman	30 October 2006	28%	28%	14%	17%	6%	4%	3%
Scottish Opinion/Sunday Mail	20 October 2006	25%	28%	11%	26%	4%	5%	1%
YouGov/The Sunday Times	7 September 2006	27%	29%	14%	15%	8%	2%	5%
TNS System Three/The Herald (see "SNP blow as poll shows Labour in eight-point lead", 4 September 2006)	29 August 2006	28%	27%	11%	19%	8%	6%	-
TNS System Three/The Herald	1 August 2006	29%	32%	10%	15%	8%	4%	-
TNS System Three/Herald	4 July 2006	29%	33%	9%	17%	5%	5%	-
Ipsos MORI	1 July 2006	26%	28%	16%	19%	6%	1%	4%
2003 Scottish Parliament election		29.3%	20.9%	15.5%	11.8%	6.9%	6.7%	9.0%

== Seat predictions ==
The Scotsman stated that the findings of their 3 April poll would produce a seat distribution as follows: SNP 44 MSPs (+17), Labour 39 MSPs (-11), Liberal Democrats 24 MSPs (+7), Conservative 15 MSPs (-3).

The Sunday Times (12 January) stated that the findings of their poll would produce a seat distribution as follows: Labour 42 MSPs (-8), SNP 38 MSPs (+11), Liberal Democrats 19 MSPs (+2), Conservative 17 MSPs (-1), Greens 9 MSPs (+2), others 4 MSPs (-6).

== Constitutional issue ==
Several polls were carried out on whether voters would support independence for Scotland, a key issue in this election and a central policy of the SNP. However, the results of such polls have historically been proven to be sensitive to the wording of the question used.

- On 10 September 2006, The Sunday Times Scotland published an opinion poll conducted by YouGov. 1176 respondents were interviewed between 5 September and 7 September 2006. The survey found that 44% were in favour of Scottish independence when asked "If there were a referendum tomorrow on whether Scotland should become an independent country, separate from the rest of the United Kingdom, how would you be inclined to vote?" 42% were against, and 15% did not know. 64% were in favour of giving the Scottish Parliament more powers, with 19% disagreeing.
- A September 2006 poll by the research agency YouGov showed that 44% of respondents said they would back a separate Scotland in an independence referendum compared with 42% who did not.
- A poll by The Scotsman in October 2006 suggested that 51% of Scots would be in favour of independence, with 39% against.
- A Daily Telegraph poll showed that a significant proportion of Britons would accept the breakup of the UK.
- On 1 November 2006, The Scotsman published an opinion poll conducted by ICM. The survey found that 51% were in favour of independence, with 37% against.

When polls give three options, including an option for greater devolution but stopping short of independence, support for full independence is much lower. In a poll by The Times, published on 20 April 2007, given a choice between independence, the status quo, or greater powers for the Scottish Parliament within the United Kingdom, the latter option had majority support (56%) with only 22% supporting full independence. Even among SNP voters, more (47%) supported a more powerful Parliament than full independence (45%).

== Other issues ==
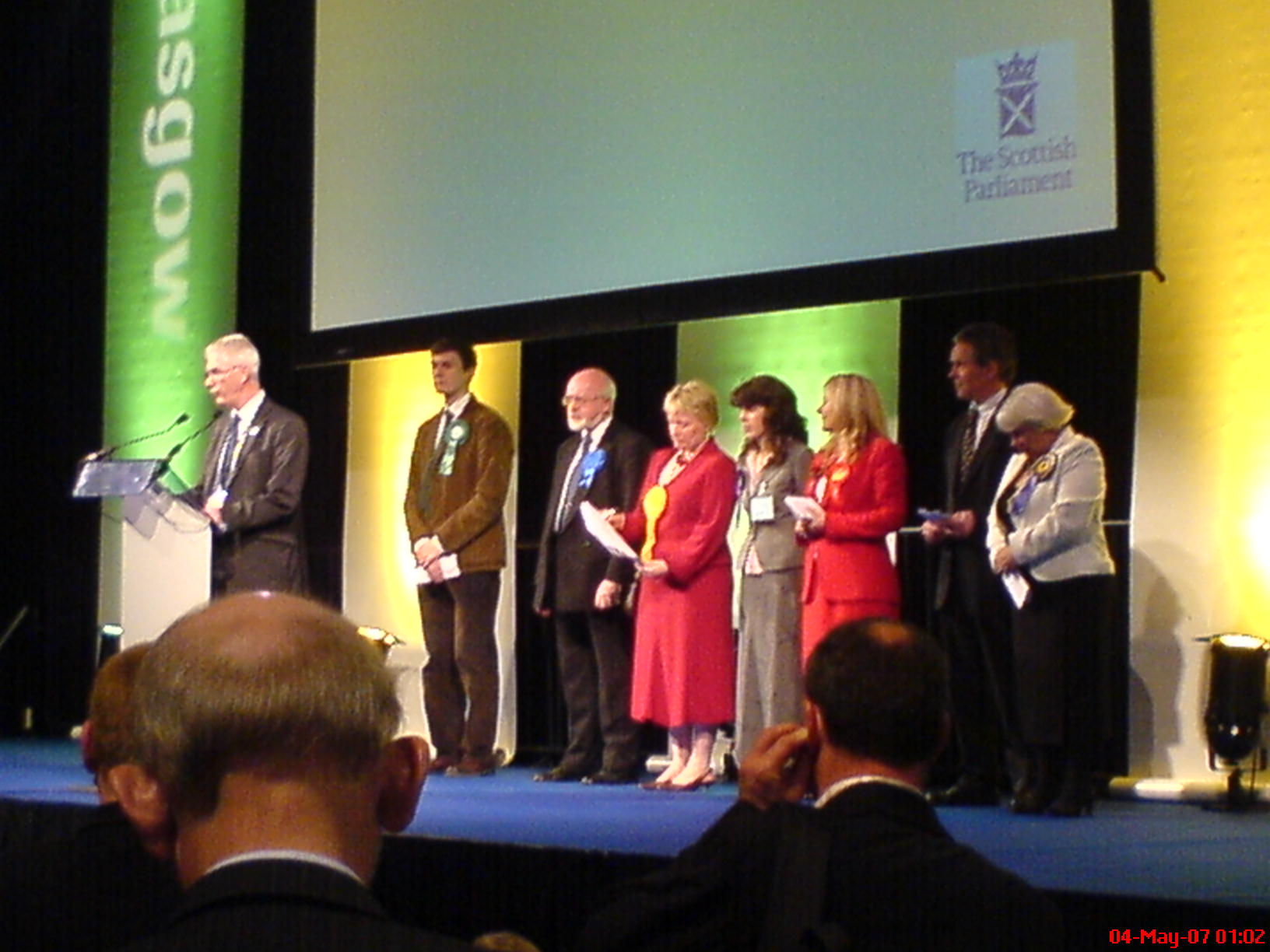
The result for the Kelvin constituency in Glasgow being declared.

On 4 April 2007, the BBC published the findings of a poll it had commissioned from ICM. The 1001 respondents were asked to rank a given list of issues, in the order which they thought "should be the priorities of the new parliament?" The respondents ranked the main issues as follows:

1. Schools/health

2. Police on streets

3. Council tax for 65s+

4. Local hospitals

5. Farming/fishing

6. Young offenders curfew

7. Free school meals

8. Buses/trains (not roads)

9. Scrap tuition fees

10. Community sentences
