= Leadership approval opinion polling for the 2015 United Kingdom general election =

At various dates in the run up to the 2015 general election, various organisations carried out opinion polling to gauge the opinions that voters hold towards political leaders. Results of such polls are displayed in this article. Most of the polling companies listed are members of the British Polling Council (BPC) and abide by its disclosure rules.

The date range for these opinion polls is from the previous general election, held on 6 May 2010, to the 7 May 2015.

== Leadership approval ratings ==
- YouGov: "Is (Insert name here) doing their job well or badly?"
- Ipsos MORI: "Are you satisfied or dissatisfied with the way (Insert name here) is doing his job as Prime Minister/Party leader?"

=== David Cameron ===
The following polls asked about voters' opinions on David Cameron, Leader of the Conservatives and Prime Minister of the United Kingdom.

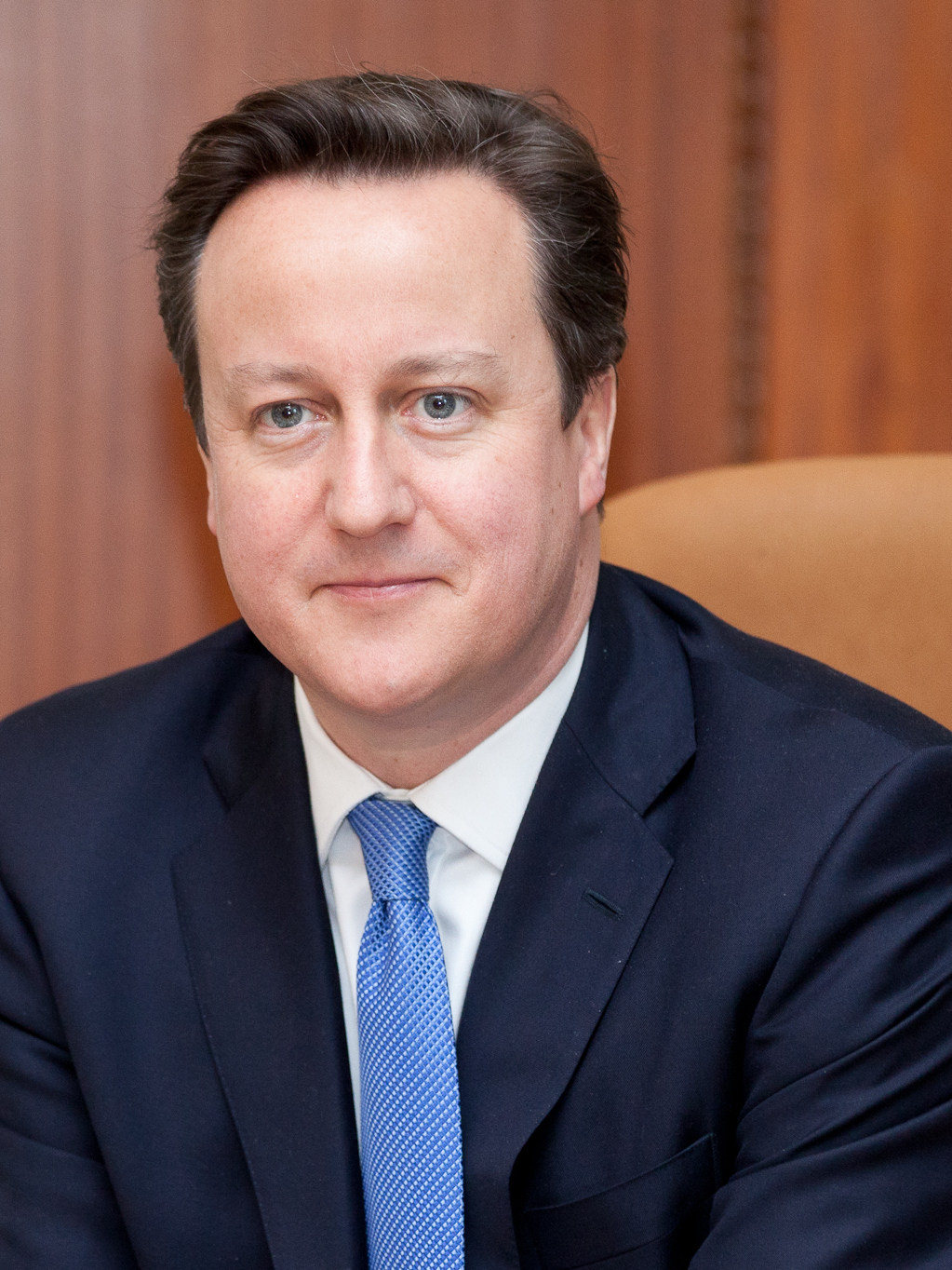
David Cameron, Prime Minister and Leader of the Conservative Party.

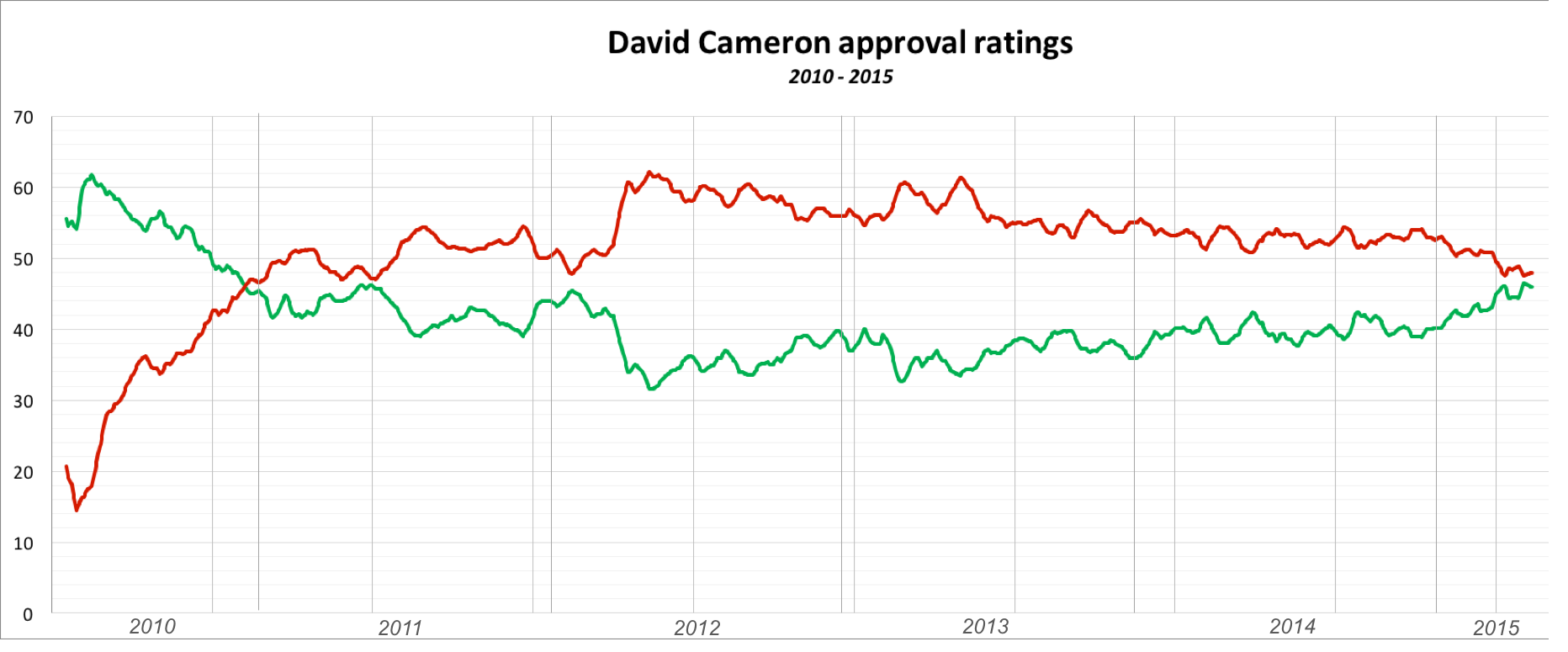
David Cameron's approval ratings from the 2010 general election to the 2015 general election (18-point average).

==== 2015 ====
Date(s) conducted	Polling organisation/client	Question wording	Approve	Disapprove	Neither	Don't know	Net approval
26-29 Apr	Ipsos MORI	Satisfied/Dissatisfied	46%	48%	—N/a	6%	–2%
17-18 Apr	YouGov	Well/Badly	47%	47%	—N/a	6%	0%
12-15 Apr	Ipsos MORI	Satisfied/Dissatisfied	39%	53%	—N/a	8%	–14%
10-11 Apr	YouGov	Well/Badly	45%	48%	—N/a	7%	–3%
3-4 Apr	YouGov	Well/Badly	47%	46%	—N/a	7%	+1%
2 Apr	Seven-way Leaders' Debate on ITV						
27-28 Mar	YouGov	Well/Badly	46%	48%	—N/a	6%	–2%
26 Mar	First TV election interview by Jeremy Paxman with David Cameron and Ed Miliband on Sky and Channel 4						
19-20 Mar	YouGov	Well/Badly	45%	50%	—N/a	5%	–5%
12-13 Mar	YouGov	Well/Badly	44%	50%	—N/a	6%	–6%
8-11 Mar	Ipsos MORI	Satisfied/Dissatisfied	38%	54%	—N/a	8%	–16%
5-6 Mar	YouGov	Well/Badly	44%	50%	—N/a	6%	–5%
26-27 Feb	YouGov	Well/Badly	44%	50%	—N/a	6%	–6%
19-20 Feb	YouGov	Well/Badly	43%	51%	—N/a	6%	–8%
12-13 Feb	YouGov	Well/Badly	42%	51%	—N/a	7%	–9%
10-12 Feb	Ipsos MORI	Satisfied/Dissatisfied	39%	53%	—N/a	8%	–14%
5-6 Feb	YouGov	Well/Badly	42%	51%	—N/a	6%	–9%
29-30 Jan	YouGov	Well/Badly	43%	50%	—N/a	7%	–7%
22-23 Jan	YouGov	Well/Badly	43%	50%	—N/a	7%	–7%
15-16 Jan	YouGov	Well/Badly	40%	54%	—N/a	7%	–14%
11-13 Jan	Ipsos MORI	Satisfied/Dissatisfied	41%	52%	—N/a	7%	–11%
8-9 Jan	YouGov	Well/Badly	40%	52%	—N/a	8%	–12%

==== 2014 ====
Date(s) conducted	Polling organisation/client	Question wording	Approve	Disapprove	Neither	Don't know	Net approval
18-19 Dec	YouGov	Well/Badly	40%	53%	—N/a	8%	–13%
13-15 Dec	Ipsos MORI	Satisfied/Dissatisfied	36%	57%	—N/a	7%	–21%
11-12 Dec	YouGov	Well/Badly	41%	52%	—N/a	7%	–11%
4-5 Dec	YouGov	Well/Badly	40%	53%	—N/a	7%	–13%
27-28 Nov	YouGov	Well/Badly	40%	53%	—N/a	7%	–13%
20-21 Nov	YouGov	Well/Badly	41%	52%	—N/a	7%	–11%
13-14 Nov	YouGov	Well/Badly	39%	54%	—N/a	6%	–15%
8-10 Nov	Ipsos MORI	Satisfied/Dissatisfied	38%	53%	—N/a	9%	–15%
6-7 Nov	YouGov	Well/Badly	41%	51%	—N/a	7%	–10%
30-31 Oct	YouGov	Well/Badly	40%	54%	—N/a	7%	–14%
23-24 Oct	YouGov	Well/Badly	43%	52%	—N/a	6%	–9%
16-17 Oct	YouGov	Well/Badly	42%	51%	—N/a	7%	–9%
11-14 Oct	Ipsos MORI	Satisfied/Dissatisfied	38%	55%	—N/a	7%	–17%
9-10 Oct	YouGov	Well/Badly	42%	52%	—N/a	6%	–10%
2-3 Oct	YouGov	Well/Badly	45%	49%	—N/a	6%	–4%
25-26 Sep	YouGov	Well/Badly	41%	53%	—N/a	6%	–12%
19 Sep	"No" wins the Scottish independence referendum.						
18-19 Sep	YouGov	Well/Badly	39%	55%	—N/a	7%	–16%
11-12 Sep	YouGov	Well/Badly	38%	54%	—N/a	8%	–16%
6-9 Sep	Ipsos MORI	Satisfied/Dissatisfied	39%	54%	—N/a	7%	–15%
4-5 Sep	YouGov	Well/Badly	42%	51%	—N/a	7%	–9%
28-29 Aug	YouGov	Well/Badly	40%	52%	—N/a	8%	–12%
21-22 Aug	YouGov	Well/Badly	41%	52%	—N/a	7%	–11%
14-15 Aug	YouGov	Well/Badly	39%	52%	—N/a	8%	–13%
9-11 Aug	Ipsos MORI	Satisfied/Dissatisfied	38%	54%	—N/a	8%	–16%
7-8 Aug	YouGov	Well/Badly	41%	51%	—N/a	8%	–10%
31 Jul-1 Aug	YouGov	Well/Badly	41%	51%	—N/a	8%	–10%
24-25 Jul	YouGov	Well/Badly	40%	51%	—N/a	8%	–11%
17-18 Jul	YouGov	Well/Badly	37%	54%	—N/a	8%	–17%
12-15 Jul	Ipsos MORI	Satisfied/Dissatisfied	36%	55%	—N/a	9%	–19%
10-11 Jul	YouGov	Well/Badly	40%	51%	—N/a	9%	–11%
3-4 Jul	YouGov	Well/Badly	41%	52%	—N/a	7%	–11%
26-27 Jun	YouGov	Well/Badly	37%	55%	—N/a	8%	–18%
19-20 Jun	YouGov	Well/Badly	40%	53%	—N/a	8%	–13%
14-17 Jun	Ipsos MORI	Satisfied/Dissatisfied	37%	55%	—N/a	8%	–18%
12-13 Jun	YouGov	Well/Badly	43%	50%	—N/a	7%	–7%
5-6 Jun	YouGov	Well/Badly	39%	54%	—N/a	7%	–15%
29–30 May	YouGov	Well/Badly	42%	52%	—N/a	6%	–10%
22 May	2014 United Kingdom local elections.						
22–23 May	YouGov	Well/Badly	42%	51%	—N/a	6%	–9%
15–16 May	YouGov	Well/Badly	43%	50%	—N/a	7%	–7%
10–12 May	Ipsos MORI	Satisfied/Dissatisfied	39%	52%	—N/a	9%	–13%
8–9 May	YouGov	Well/Badly	40%	52%	—N/a	8%	–12%
1–2 May	YouGov	Well/Badly	40%	52%	—N/a	7%	–12%
24-25 Apr	YouGov	Well/Badly	38%	55%	—N/a	8%	–17%
10-11 Apr	YouGov	Well/Badly	38%	54%	—N/a	7%	–16%
5-7 Apr	Ipsos MORI	Satisfied/Dissatisfied	38%	56%	—N/a	6%	–18%
3-4 Apr	YouGov	Well/Badly	41%	51%	—N/a	8%	–10%
27-28 Mar	YouGov	Well/Badly	42%	51%	—N/a	7%	–9%
20-21 Mar	YouGov	Well/Badly	42%	51%	—N/a	7%	–9%
13-14 Mar	YouGov	Well/Badly	39%	53%	—N/a	7%	–14%
8-12 Mar	Ipsos MORI	Satisfied/Dissatisfied	37%	56%	—N/a	7%	–19%
6-7 Mar	YouGov	Well/Badly	42%	52%	—N/a	7%	–10%
27-28 Feb	YouGov	Well/Badly	41%	53%	—N/a	6%	–12%
20-21 Feb	YouGov	Well/Badly	39%	55%	—N/a	6%	–16%
13-14 Feb	YouGov	Well/Badly	41%	52%	—N/a	6%	–11%
9-10 Feb	YouGov	Well/Badly	41%	52%	—N/a	6%	–11%
1-3 Feb	Ipsos MORI	Satisfied/Dissatisfied	37%	55%	—N/a	8%	–18%
30-31 Jan	YouGov	Well/Badly	41%	53%	—N/a	6%	–12%
23-24 Jan	YouGov	Well/Badly	41%	53%	—N/a	5%	–12%
16-17 Jan	YouGov	Well/Badly	39%	54%	—N/a	7%	–15%
11-14 Jan	Ipsos MORI	Satisfied/Dissatisfied	39%	53%	—N/a	8%	–14%
9-10 Jan	YouGov	Well/Badly	37%	57%	—N/a	6%	–20%

==== 2013 ====
Date(s) conducted	Polling organisation/client	Question wording	Approve	Disapprove	Neither	Don't know	Net approval
12-13 Dec	YouGov	Well/Badly	36%	55%	—N/a	8%	–19%
7-9 Dec	Ipsos MORI	Satisfied/Dissatisfied	39%	52%	—N/a	9%	–13%
5-6 Dec	YouGov	Well/Badly	39%	54%	—N/a	8%	–15%
28-29 Nov	YouGov	Well/Badly	37%	55%	—N/a	9%	–18%
21-22 Nov	YouGov	Well/Badly	40%	53%	—N/a	6%	–13%
14-15 Nov	YouGov	Well/Badly	37%	56%	—N/a	6%	–19%
9-11 Nov	Ipsos MORI	Satisfied/Dissatisfied	35%	56%	—N/a	9%	–21%
7-8 Nov	YouGov	Well/Badly	38%	56%	—N/a	7%	–18%
31 Oct-1 Nov	YouGov	Well/Badly	38%	56%	—N/a	7%	–18%
24-25 Oct	YouGov	Well/Badly	36%	58%	—N/a	5%	–22%
17-18 Oct	YouGov	Well/Badly	38%	53%	—N/a	8%	–15%
12-15 Oct	Ipsos MORI	Satisfied/Dissatisfied	39%	53%	—N/a	8%	–14%
10-11 Oct	YouGov	Well/Badly	41%	52%	—N/a	7%	–11%
3-4 Oct	YouGov	Well/Badly	41%	53%	—N/a	6%	–12%
26-27 Sep	YouGov	Well/Badly	38%	57%	—N/a	6%	–19%
19-20 Sep	YouGov	Well/Badly	40%	54%	—N/a	6%	–14%
12-13 Sep	YouGov	Well/Badly	40%	52%	—N/a	9%	–12%
7-9 Sep	Ipsos MORI	Satisfied/Dissatisfied	36%	56%	—N/a	8%	–20%
5-6 Sep	YouGov	Well/Badly	39%	54%	—N/a	8%	–15%
30-31 Aug	YouGov	Well/Badly	36%	55%	—N/a	8%	–19%
22-23 Aug	YouGov	Well/Badly	38%	56%	—N/a	6%	–18%
15-16 Aug	YouGov	Well/Badly	39%	54%	—N/a	7%	–15%
10-12 Aug	Ipsos MORI	Satisfied/Dissatisfied	38%	55%	—N/a	7%	–17%
8-9 Aug	YouGov	Well/Badly	39%	54%	—N/a	7%	–15%
1-2 Aug	YouGov	Well/Badly	39%	56%	—N/a	6%	–17%
25-26 Jul	YouGov	Well/Badly	38%	54%	—N/a	8%	–16%
18-19 Jul	YouGov	Well/Badly	37%	55%	—N/a	8%	–18%
13-15 Jul	Ipsos MORI	Satisfied/Dissatisfied	38%	54%	—N/a	8%	–16%
11-12 Jul	YouGov	Well/Badly	34%	60%	—N/a	5%	–26%
4-5 Jul	YouGov	Well/Badly	36%	56%	—N/a	8%	–20%
27-28 Jun	YouGov	Well/Badly	38%	55%	—N/a	7%	–17%
20-21 Jun	YouGov	Well/Badly	37%	55%	—N/a	8%	–18%
13-14 Jun	YouGov	Well/Badly	34%	59%	—N/a	7%	–25%
8-10 Jun	Ipsos MORI	Satisfied/Dissatisfied	34%	58%	—N/a	8%	–24%
6-7 Jun	YouGov	Well/Badly	34%	61%	—N/a	6%	–27%
30–31 May	YouGov	Well/Badly	35%	61%	—N/a	5%	–26%
23–24 May	YouGov	Well/Badly	34%	61%	—N/a	5%	–27%
16–17 May	YouGov	Well/Badly	32%	62%	—N/a	5%	–30%
11–13 May	Ipsos MORI	Satisfied/Dissatisfied	36%	57%	—N/a	7%	–21%
9–10 May	YouGov	Well/Badly	35%	58%	—N/a	7%	–23%
2 May	2013 United Kingdom local elections.						
2–3 May	YouGov	Well/Badly	35%	58%	—N/a	7%	–23%
25-26 Apr	YouGov	Well/Badly	36%	57%	—N/a	7%	–21%
18-19 Apr	YouGov	Well/Badly	39%	55%	—N/a	6%	–16%
13-15 Apr	Ipsos MORI	Satisfied/Dissatisfied	32%	60%	—N/a	8%	–28%
11-12 Apr	YouGov	Well/Badly	35%	59%	—N/a	5%	–24%
4-5 Apr	YouGov	Well/Badly	36%	59%	—N/a	5%	–23%
21-22 Mar	YouGov	Well/Badly	36%	59%	—N/a	5%	–23%
14-15 Mar	YouGov	Well/Badly	32%	62%	—N/a	7%	–30%
9-11 Mar	Ipsos MORI	Satisfied/Dissatisfied	31%	61%	—N/a	8%	–30%
7-8 Mar	YouGov	Well/Badly	34%	58%	—N/a	8%	–24%
28 Feb-1 Mar	YouGov	Well/Badly	35%	58%	—N/a	6%	–23%
21-22 Feb	YouGov	Well/Badly	40%	55%	—N/a	5%	–15%
14-15 Feb	YouGov	Well/Badly	38%	56%	—N/a	7%	–18%
9-11 Feb	Ipsos MORI	Satisfied/Dissatisfied	34%	58%	—N/a	8%	–24%
7-8 Feb	YouGov	Well/Badly	40%	55%	—N/a	5%	–15%
31 Jan-1 Feb	YouGov	Well/Badly	40%	55%	—N/a	5%	–15%
24-25 Jan	YouGov	Well/Badly	40%	55%	—N/a	5%	–15%
17-18 Jan	YouGov	Well/Badly	40%	54%	—N/a	6%	–14%
12-14 Jan	Ipsos MORI	Satisfied/Dissatisfied	34%	59%	—N/a	7%	–25%
10-11 Jan	YouGov	Well/Badly	38%	56%	—N/a	6%	–18%
3-4 Jan	YouGov	Well/Badly	37%	56%	—N/a	7%	–19%

==== 2012 ====
Date(s) conducted	Polling organisation/client	Question wording	Approve	Disapprove	Neither	Don't know	Net approval
20-21 Dec	YouGov	Well/Badly	40%	56%	—N/a	4%	–16%
13-14 Dec	YouGov	Well/Badly	39%	56%	—N/a	4%	–17%
8-10 Dec	Ipsos MORI	Satisfied/Dissatisfied	37%	56%	—N/a	6%	–19%
6-7 Dec	YouGov	Well/Badly	39%	58%	—N/a	4%	–19%
30 Nov-1 Dec	YouGov	Well/Badly	37%	58%	—N/a	4%	–21%
22-23 Nov	YouGov	Well/Badly	38%	56%	—N/a	5%	–18%
15-16 Nov	YouGov	Well/Badly	39%	56%	—N/a	6%	–17%
10-13 Nov	Ipsos MORI	Satisfied/Dissatisfied	40%	54%	—N/a	6%	–14%
8-9 Nov	YouGov	Well/Badly	39%	55%	—N/a	6%	–16%
1-2 Nov	YouGov	Well/Badly	38%	57%	—N/a	5%	–19%
25-26 Oct	YouGov	Well/Badly	39%	55%	—N/a	6%	–16%
20-24 Oct	Ipsos MORI	Satisfied/Dissatisfied	33%	62%	—N/a	5%	–29%
18-19 Oct	YouGov	Well/Badly	37%	56%	—N/a	7%	–19%
11-12 Oct	YouGov	Well/Badly	37%	57%	—N/a	7%	–20%
4-5 Oct	YouGov	Well/Badly	35%	59%	—N/a	6%	–24%
27-28 Sep	YouGov	Well/Badly	34%	59%	—N/a	6%	–25%
20-21 Sep	YouGov	Well/Badly	37%	58%	—N/a	5%	–21%
15-17 Sep	Ipsos MORI	Satisfied/Dissatisfied	34%	58%	—N/a	8%	–24%
13-14 Sep	YouGov	Well/Badly	34%	60%	—N/a	6%	–26%
6-7 Sep	YouGov	Well/Badly	33%	61%	—N/a	7%	–28%
30-31 Aug	YouGov	Well/Badly	34%	60%	—N/a	6%	–26%
23-24 Aug	YouGov	Well/Badly	34%	60%	—N/a	6%	–26%
16-17 Aug	YouGov	Well/Badly	34%	59%	—N/a	7%	–25%
11-13 Aug	Ipsos MORI	Satisfied/Dissatisfied	39%	55%	—N/a	6%	–16%
9-10 Aug	YouGov	Well/Badly	36%	57%	—N/a	7%	–21%
2-3 Aug	YouGov	Well/Badly	37%	58%	—N/a	5%	–21%
26-27 Jul	YouGov	Well/Badly	35%	60%	—N/a	6%	–25%
19-20 Jul	YouGov	Well/Badly	36%	59%	—N/a	6%	–23%
14-16 Jul	Ipsos MORI	Satisfied/Dissatisfied	33%	60%	—N/a	7%	–27%
12-13 Jul	YouGov	Well/Badly	35%	60%	—N/a	6%	–25%
5-6 Jul	YouGov	Well/Badly	34%	61%	—N/a	6%	–27%
28-29 Jun	YouGov	Well/Badly	35%	59%	—N/a	6%	–24%
21-22 Jun	YouGov	Well/Badly	38%	56%	—N/a	6%	–18%
14-15 Jun	YouGov	Well/Badly	35%	60%	—N/a	5%	–25%
9-11 Jun	Ipsos MORI	Satisfied/Dissatisfied	34%	58%	—N/a	8%	–24%
7-8 Jun	YouGov	Well/Badly	36%	59%	—N/a	6%	–23%
30 May-1 Jun	YouGov	Well/Badly	34%	60%	—N/a	6%	–26%
24–25 May	YouGov	Well/Badly	34%	60%	—N/a	6%	–26%
17–18 May	YouGov	Well/Badly	33%	63%	—N/a	5%	–30%
12–14 May	Ipsos MORI	Satisfied/Dissatisfied	32%	60%	—N/a	8%	–28%
10–11 May	YouGov	Well/Badly	32%	61%	—N/a	7%	–29%
3 May	2012 United Kingdom local elections.						
3–4 May	YouGov	Well/Badly	31%	62%	—N/a	7%	–31%
26-27 Apr	YouGov	Well/Badly	32%	63%	—N/a	5%	–31%
21-23 Apr	Ipsos MORI	Satisfied/Dissatisfied	37%	57%	—N/a	6%	–20%
19-20 Apr	YouGov	Well/Badly	36%	59%	—N/a	5%	–23%
12-13 Apr	YouGov	Well/Badly	34%	60%	—N/a	6%	–26%
30-31 Mar	YouGov	Well/Badly	34%	61%	—N/a	6%	–27%
22-23 Mar	YouGov	Well/Badly	42%	53%	—N/a	5%	–11%
17-29 Mar	Ipsos MORI	Satisfied/Dissatisfied	41%	52%	—N/a	7%	–11%
15-16 Mar	YouGov	Well/Badly	44%	49%	—N/a	7%	–5%
8-9 Mar	YouGov	Well/Badly	42%	51%	—N/a	7%	–9%
1-2 Mar	YouGov	Well/Badly	44%	50%	—N/a	6%	–6%
25-27 Feb	Ipsos MORI	Satisfied/Dissatisfied	40%	51%	—N/a	9%	–9%
23-24 Feb	YouGov	Well/Badly	41%	51%	—N/a	7%	–10%
16-17 Feb	YouGov	Well/Badly	42%	52%	—N/a	6%	–10%
9-10 Feb	YouGov	Well/Badly	45%	49%	—N/a	6%	–4%
2-3 Feb	YouGov	Well/Badly	44%	50%	—N/a	6%	–6%
26-27 Jan	YouGov	Well/Badly	46%	47%	—N/a	7%	–1%
21-23 Jan	Ipsos MORI	Satisfied/Dissatisfied	46%	47%	—N/a	7%	–1%
19-20 Jan	YouGov	Well/Badly	45%	48%	—N/a	7%	–3%
12-13 Jan	YouGov	Well/Badly	42%	52%	—N/a	6%	–10%
5-6 Jan	YouGov	Well/Badly	44%	51%	—N/a	5%	–7%

==== 2011 ====
Date(s) conducted	Polling organisation/client	Question wording	Approve	Disapprove	Neither	Don't know	Net approval
15-16 Dec	YouGov	Well/Badly	44%	50%	—N/a	6%	–6%
10-12 Dec	Ipsos MORI	Satisfied/Dissatisfied	43%	50%	—N/a	7%	–7%
8-9 Dec	YouGov	Well/Badly	42%	52%	—N/a	7%	–10%
1-2 Dec	YouGov	Well/Badly	38%	56%	—N/a	6%	–18%
24-25 Nov	YouGov	Well/Badly	40%	54%	—N/a	6%	–14%
19-21 Nov	Ipsos MORI	Satisfied/Dissatisfied	39%	53%	—N/a	8%	–14%
17-18 Nov	YouGov	Well/Badly	42%	52%	—N/a	6%	–10%
10-11 Nov	YouGov	Well/Badly	40%	52%	—N/a	8%	–12%
3-4 Nov	YouGov	Well/Badly	41%	52%	—N/a	7%	–11%
27-28 Oct	YouGov	Well/Badly	41%	52%	—N/a	7%	–11%
22-24 Oct	Ipsos MORI	Satisfied/Dissatisfied	40%	54%	—N/a	6%	–14%
20-21 Oct	YouGov	Well/Badly	44%	51%	—N/a	5%	–7%
13-14 Oct	YouGov	Well/Badly	43%	51%	—N/a	6%	–8%
6-7 Oct	YouGov	Well/Badly	42%	52%	—N/a	6%	–10%
29-30 Sep	YouGov	Well/Badly	43%	51%	—N/a	6%	–8%
22-23 Sep	YouGov	Well/Badly	43%	51%	—N/a	7%	–8%
15-16 Sep	YouGov	Well/Badly	43%	51%	—N/a	6%	–8%
10-12 Sep	Ipsos MORI	Satisfied/Dissatisfied	39%	52%	—N/a	9%	–13%
8-9 Sep	YouGov	Well/Badly	42%	52%	—N/a	6%	–10%
1-2 Sep	YouGov	Well/Badly	42%	51%	—N/a	7%	–9%
25-26 Aug	YouGov	Well/Badly	42%	52%	—N/a	6%	–10%
20-22 Aug	Ipsos MORI	Satisfied/Dissatisfied	39%	51%	—N/a	10%	–12%
18-19 Aug	YouGov	Well/Badly	42%	53%	—N/a	5%	–11%
11-12 Aug	YouGov	Well/Badly	41%	53%	—N/a	6%	–12%
4-5 Aug	YouGov	Well/Badly	40%	54%	—N/a	6%	–14%
28-29 Jul	YouGov	Well/Badly	40%	54%	—N/a	6%	–14%
21-22 Jul	YouGov	Well/Badly	39%	55%	—N/a	6%	–16%
16-18 Jul	Ipsos MORI	Satisfied/Dissatisfied	38%	53%	—N/a	9%	–15%
14-15 Jul	YouGov	Well/Badly	41%	53%	—N/a	7%	–12%
7-8 Jul	YouGov	Well/Badly	40%	53%	—N/a	7%	–13%
30 Jun-1 Jul	YouGov	Well/Badly	42%	52%	—N/a	6%	–10%
23-24 Jun	YouGov	Well/Badly	42%	52%	—N/a	6%	–10%
17-19 Jun	Ipsos MORI	Satisfied/Dissatisfied	45%	47%	—N/a	8%	–2%
16-17 Jun	YouGov	Well/Badly	44%	48%	—N/a	7%	–4%
9-10 Jun	YouGov	Well/Badly	44%	50%	—N/a	6%	–6%
2-3 Jun	YouGov	Well/Badly	45%	48%	—N/a	7%	–3%
26–27 May	YouGov	Well/Badly	48%	46%	—N/a	6%	+2%
20–24 May	Ipsos MORI	Satisfied/Dissatisfied	44%	47%	—N/a	9%	–3%
19–20 May	YouGov	Well/Badly	46%	50%	—N/a	4%	–4%
12–13 May	YouGov	Well/Badly	47%	48%	—N/a	5%	–1%
5 May	United Kingdom local elections. Also Scottish Parliament election and Welsh Assembly election.						
5–6 May	YouGov	Well/Badly	46%	49%	—N/a	5%	–3%
28-29 Apr	YouGov	Well/Badly	45%	49%	—N/a	6%	–4%
15-17 Apr	Ipsos MORI	Satisfied/Dissatisfied	44%	47%	—N/a	8%	–3%
14-15 Apr	YouGov	Well/Badly	43%	51%	—N/a	6%	–8%
7-8 Apr	YouGov	Well/Badly	43%	52%	—N/a	6%	–9%
31 Mar- 1 Apr	YouGov	Well/Badly	44%	49%	—N/a	7%	–5%
24-25 Mar	YouGov	Well/Badly	47%	47%	—N/a	6%	0%
17-18 Mar	YouGov	Well/Badly	43%	50%	—N/a	7%	–7%
11-13 Mar	Ipsos MORI	Satisfied/Dissatisfied	43%	51%	—N/a	6%	–8%
10-11 Mar	YouGov	Well/Badly	40%	53%	—N/a	7%	–13%
3-4 Mar	YouGov	Well/Badly	41%	52%	—N/a	6%	–11%
24-25 Feb	YouGov	Well/Badly	44%	50%	—N/a	6%	–6%
18-20 Feb	Ipsos MORI	Satisfied/Dissatisfied	39%	52%	—N/a	9%	–13%
17-18 Feb	YouGov	Well/Badly	43%	51%	—N/a	6%	–8%
10-11 Feb	YouGov	Well/Badly	43%	51%	—N/a	6%	–8%
3-4 Feb	YouGov	Well/Badly	46%	49%	—N/a	6%	–3%
27-28 Jan	YouGov	Well/Badly	45%	48%	—N/a	6%	–3%
21-24 Jan	Ipsos MORI	Satisfied/Dissatisfied	38%	52%	—N/a	10%	–12%
20-21 Jan	YouGov	Well/Badly	43%	49%	—N/a	8%	–6%
13-14 Jan	YouGov	Well/Badly	43%	48%	—N/a	7%	–5%
6-7 Jan	YouGov	Well/Badly	46%	46%	—N/a	8%	0%

==== 2010 ====
Date(s) conducted	Polling organisation/client	Question wording	Approve	Disapprove	Neither	Don't know	Net approval
16-17 Dec	YouGov	Well/Badly	45%	47%	—N/a	7%	–2%
10-12 Dec	Ipsos MORI	Satisfied/Dissatisfied	48%	44%	—N/a	8%	+4%
9-10 Dec	YouGov	Well/Badly	47%	46%	—N/a	7%	+1%
2-3 Dec	YouGov	Well/Badly	49%	44%	—N/a	7%	+5%
25-26 Nov	YouGov	Well/Badly	47%	45%	—N/a	8%	+2%
18-19 Nov	YouGov	Well/Badly	51%	39%	—N/a	9%	+12%
12-14 Nov	Ipsos MORI	Satisfied/Dissatisfied	46%	45%	—N/a	9%	+1%
11-12 Nov	YouGov	Well/Badly	50%	42%	—N/a	8%	+8%
4-5 Nov	YouGov	Well/Badly	49%	43%	—N/a	7%	+6%
28-29 Oct	YouGov	Well/Badly	54%	39%	—N/a	7%	+15%
21-22 Oct	YouGov	Well/Badly	49%	41%	—N/a	9%	+8%
15-17 Oct	Ipsos MORI	Satisfied/Dissatisfied	52%	37%	—N/a	15%	+15%
14-15 Oct	YouGov	Well/Badly	52%	41%	—N/a	8%	+11%
7-8 Oct	YouGov	Well/Badly	57%	36%	—N/a	8%	+21%
30 Sep-1 Oct	YouGov	Well/Badly	53%	37%	—N/a	10%	+16%
26-27 Sep	YouGov	Well/Badly	53%	37%	—N/a	10%	+16%
23-24 Sep	YouGov	Well/Badly	54%	35%	—N/a	10%	+19%
16-17 Sep	YouGov	Well/Badly	52%	37%	—N/a	10%	+15%
10-12 Sep	Ipsos MORI	Satisfied/Dissatisfied	57%	33%	—N/a	10%	+24%
9-10 Sep	YouGov	Well/Badly	57%	33%	—N/a	11%	+24%
2-3 Sep	YouGov	Well/Badly	54%	36%	—N/a	10%	+18%
26-27 Aug	YouGov	Well/Badly	59%	32%	—N/a	9%	+27%
19-20 Aug	YouGov	Well/Badly	53%	36%	—N/a	10%	+17%
12-13 Aug	YouGov	Well/Badly	54%	37%	—N/a	8%	+17%
5-6 Aug	YouGov	Well/Badly	55%	35%	—N/a	10%	+20%
29-30 Jul	YouGov	Well/Badly	56%	34%	—N/a	11%	+22%
23-25 Jul	Ipsos MORI	Satisfied/Dissatisfied	55%	32%	—N/a	13%	+23%
22-23 Jul	YouGov	Well/Badly	57%	32%	—N/a	10%	+25%
15-16 Jul	YouGov	Well/Badly	58%	31%	—N/a	11%	+27%
8-9 Jul	YouGov	Well/Badly	59%	28%	—N/a	12%	+31%
1-2 Jul	YouGov	Well/Badly	58%	30%	—N/a	12%	+28%
24-25 Jun	YouGov	Well/Badly	61%	27%	—N/a	11%	+34%
18-20 Jun	Ipsos MORI	Satisfied/Dissatisfied	57%	26%	—N/a	17%	+31%
17-18 Jun	YouGov	Well/Badly	64%	20%	—N/a	16%	+44%
10-11 Jun	YouGov	Well/Badly	60%	19%	—N/a	21%	+41%
3-4 Jun	YouGov	Well/Badly	63%	16%	—N/a	20%	+47%
27–28 May	YouGov	Well/Badly	60%	18%	—N/a	23%	+42%
20–21 May	YouGov	Well/Badly	57%	15%	—N/a	28%	+42%
13–14 May	YouGov	Well/Badly	48%	12%	—N/a	40%	+36%
7–8 May	YouGov	Well/Badly	62%	29%	—N/a	8%	+33%

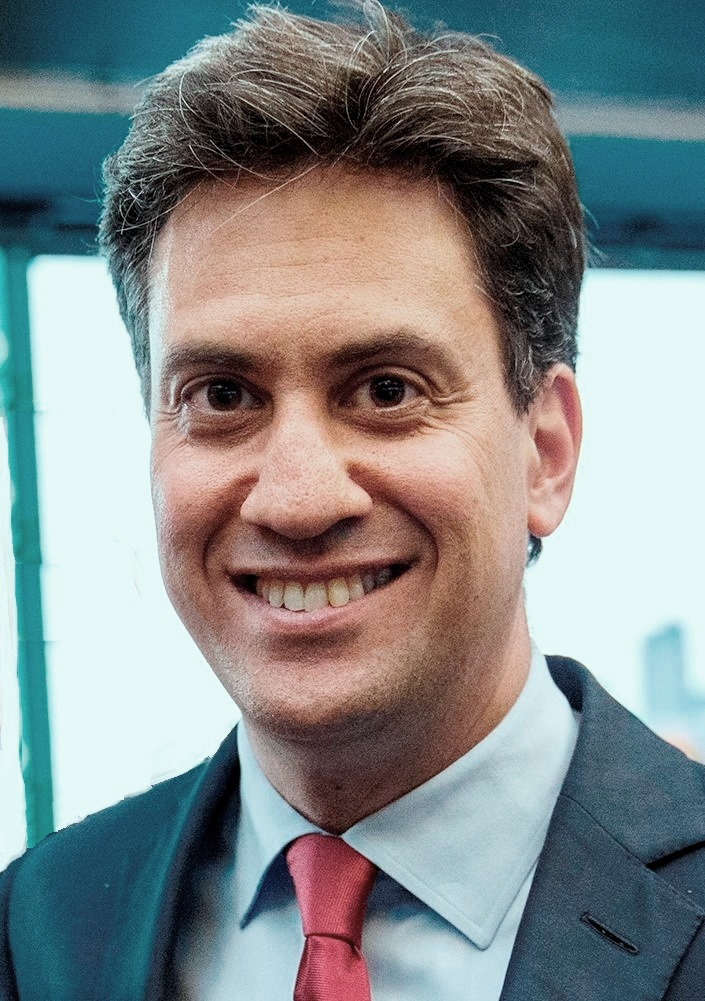
Ed Miliband, Leader of the Labour Party.

=== Ed Miliband ===
The following polls asked about voters' opinions on Ed Miliband, Leader of the Labour Party.

==== 2015 ====
Date(s) conducted	Polling organisation/client	Question wording	Approve	Disapprove	Neither	Don't know	Net approval
26-29 Apr	Ipsos MORI	Satisfied/Dissatisfied	35%	54%	—N/a	11%	–19%
17-18 Apr	YouGov	Well/Badly	36%	54%	—N/a	9%	–18%
12-15 Apr	Ipsos MORI	Satisfied/Dissatisfied	33%	52%	—N/a	15%	–19%
10-11 Apr	YouGov	Well/Badly	32%	57%	—N/a	11%	–25%
3-4 Apr	YouGov	Well/Badly	33%	59%	—N/a	9%	–26%
2 Apr	Seven-way Leaders' Debate on ITV						
27-28 Mar	YouGov	Well/Badly	30%	59%	—N/a	10%	–29%
26 Mar	First TV election interview by Jeremy Paxman with David Cameron and Ed Miliband on Sky and Channel 4						
19-20 Mar	YouGov	Well/Badly	26%	65%	—N/a	9%	–39%
12-13 Mar	YouGov	Well/Badly	24%	66%	—N/a	9%	–42%
8-11 Mar	Ipsos MORI	Satisfied/Dissatisfied	28%	59%	—N/a	13%	–31%
5-6 Mar	YouGov	Well/Badly	21%	69%	—N/a	11%	–48%
26-27 Feb	YouGov	Well/Badly	22%	68%	—N/a	10%	–46%
19-20 Feb	YouGov	Well/Badly	22%	68%	—N/a	9%	–46%
12-13 Feb	YouGov	Well/Badly	22%	69%	—N/a	9%	–47%
10-12 Feb	Ipsos MORI	Satisfied/Dissatisfied	26%	61%	—N/a	13%	–35%
5-6 Feb	YouGov	Well/Badly	19%	69%	—N/a	11%	–50%
29-30 Jan	YouGov	Well/Badly	22%	68%	—N/a	11%	–46%
22-23 Jan	YouGov	Well/Badly	20%	70%	—N/a	10%	–50%
15-16 Jan	YouGov	Well/Badly	22%	68%	—N/a	11%	–46%
11-13 Jan	Ipsos MORI	Satisfied/Dissatisfied	26%	61%	—N/a	13%	–35%
8-9 Jan	YouGov	Well/Badly	18%	70%	—N/a	12%	–52%

==== 2014 ====
Date(s) conducted	Polling organisation/client	Question wording	Approve	Disapprove	Neither	Don't know	Net approval
18-19 Dec	YouGov	Well/Badly	19%	70%	—N/a	10%	–51%
13-15 Dec	Ipsos MORI	Satisfied/Dissatisfied	25%	63%	—N/a	12%	–38%
11-12 Dec	YouGov	Well/Badly	18%	71%	—N/a	11%	–53%
4-5 Dec	YouGov	Well/Badly	18%	72%	—N/a	10%	–54%
27-28 Nov	YouGov	Well/Badly	17%	73%	—N/a	9%	–56%
20-21 Nov	YouGov	Well/Badly	20%	72%	—N/a	9%	–52%
13-14 Nov	YouGov	Well/Badly	18%	74%	—N/a	8%	–56%
8-10 Nov	Ipsos MORI	Satisfied/Dissatisfied	21%	65%	—N/a	14%	–44%
6-7 Nov	YouGov	Well/Badly	18%	74%	—N/a	9%	–56%
30-31 Oct	YouGov	Well/Badly	18%	73%	—N/a	9%	–55%
23-24 Oct	YouGov	Well/Badly	20%	71%	—N/a	9%	–51%
16-17 Oct	YouGov	Well/Badly	21%	69%	—N/a	10%	–48%
11-14 Oct	Ipsos MORI	Satisfied/Dissatisfied	25%	59%	—N/a	16%	–34%
9-10 Oct	YouGov	Well/Badly	21%	69%	—N/a	9%	–48%
2-3 Oct	YouGov	Well/Badly	22%	68%	—N/a	9%	–46%
25-26 Sep	YouGov	Well/Badly	24%	67%	—N/a	9%	–43%
19 Sep	"No" wins the Scottish independence referendum.						
18-19 Sep	YouGov	Well/Badly	21%	68%	—N/a	11%	–47%
11-12 Sep	YouGov	Well/Badly	21%	67%	—N/a	12%	–46%
6-9 Sep	Ipsos MORI	Satisfied/Dissatisfied	29%	58%	—N/a	13%	–29%
4-5 Sep	YouGov	Well/Badly	23%	66%	—N/a	11%	–43%
28-29 Aug	YouGov	Well/Badly	21%	67%	—N/a	12%	–46%
21-22 Aug	YouGov	Well/Badly	24%	64%	—N/a	11%	–40%
14-15 Aug	YouGov	Well/Badly	22%	66%	—N/a	12%	–44%
9-11 Aug	Ipsos MORI	Satisfied/Dissatisfied	29%	58%	—N/a	13%	–29%
7-8 Aug	YouGov	Well/Badly	25%	65%	—N/a	10%	–40%
31 Jul-1 Aug	YouGov	Well/Badly	24%	65%	—N/a	11%	–41%
24-25 Jul	YouGov	Well/Badly	22%	66%	—N/a	12%	–44%
17-18 Jul	YouGov	Well/Badly	23%	66%	—N/a	11%	–43%
12-15 Jul	Ipsos MORI	Satisfied/Dissatisfied	28%	61%	—N/a	11%	–33%
10-11 Jul	YouGov	Well/Badly	22%	65%	—N/a	12%	–43%
3-4 Jul	YouGov	Well/Badly	23%	68%	—N/a	10%	–45%
26-27 Jun	YouGov	Well/Badly	21%	66%	—N/a	13%	–45%
19-20 Jun	YouGov	Well/Badly	23%	66%	—N/a	11%	–43%
14-17 Jun	Ipsos MORI	Satisfied/Dissatisfied	29%	57%	—N/a	14%	–28%
12-13 Jun	YouGov	Well/Badly	23%	67%	—N/a	10%	–44%
5-6 Jun	YouGov	Well/Badly	25%	66%	—N/a	10%	–41%
29–30 May	YouGov	Well/Badly	22%	68%	—N/a	10%	–46%
22 May	2014 United Kingdom local elections.						
22–23 May	YouGov	Well/Badly	24%	65%	—N/a	11%	–41%
15–16 May	YouGov	Well/Badly	24%	66%	—N/a	11%	–42%
10–12 May	Ipsos MORI	Satisfied/Dissatisfied	31%	54%	—N/a	15%	–23%
8–9 May	YouGov	Well/Badly	27%	59%	—N/a	14%	–32%
1–2 May	YouGov	Well/Badly	26%	64%	—N/a	11%	–38%
24-25 Apr	YouGov	Well/Badly	26%	61%	—N/a	12%	–35%
10-11 Apr	YouGov	Well/Badly	26%	62%	—N/a	12%	–36%
5-7 Apr	Ipsos MORI	Satisfied/Dissatisfied	30%	56%	—N/a	14%	–26%
3-4 Apr	YouGov	Well/Badly	27%	61%	—N/a	13%	–34%
27-28 Mar	YouGov	Well/Badly	29%	62%	—N/a	10%	–31%
20-21 Mar	YouGov	Well/Badly	29%	60%	—N/a	12%	–31%
13-14 Mar	YouGov	Well/Badly	28%	60%	—N/a	13%	–32%
8-12 Mar	Ipsos MORI	Satisfied/Dissatisfied	32%	53%	—N/a	15%	–21%
6-7 Mar	YouGov	Well/Badly	31%	59%	—N/a	11%	–28%
27-28 Feb	YouGov	Well/Badly	27%	61%	—N/a	12%	–34%
20-21 Feb	YouGov	Well/Badly	28%	59%	—N/a	12%	–31%
13-14 Feb	YouGov	Well/Badly	30%	58%	—N/a	12%	–28%
9-10 Feb	YouGov	Well/Badly	30%	58%	—N/a	12%	–28%
1-3 Feb	Ipsos MORI	Satisfied/Dissatisfied	31%	52%	—N/a	17%	–21%
30-31 Jan	YouGov	Well/Badly	28%	61%	—N/a	12%	–33%
23-24 Jan	YouGov	Well/Badly	26%	64%	—N/a	11%	–38%
16-17 Jan	YouGov	Well/Badly	28%	63%	—N/a	10%	–35%
11-14 Jan	Ipsos MORI	Satisfied/Dissatisfied	31%	53%	—N/a	16%	–22%
9-10 Jan	YouGov	Well/Badly	28%	60%	—N/a	13%	–32%

==== 2013 ====
Date(s) conducted	Polling organisation/client	Question wording	Approve	Disapprove	Neither	Don't know	Net approval
12-13 Dec	YouGov	Well/Badly	27%	61%	—N/a	13%	–34%
7-9 Dec	Ipsos MORI	Satisfied/Dissatisfied	29%	54%	—N/a	17%	–25%
5-6 Dec	YouGov	Well/Badly	26%	61%	—N/a	13%	–35%
28-29 Nov	YouGov	Well/Badly	27%	60%	—N/a	12%	–33%
21-22 Nov	YouGov	Well/Badly	29%	60%	—N/a	11%	–31%
14-15 Nov	YouGov	Well/Badly	28%	60%	—N/a	12%	–32%
9-11 Nov	Ipsos MORI	Satisfied/Dissatisfied	31%	54%	—N/a	15%	–23%
7-8 Nov	YouGov	Well/Badly	30%	58%	—N/a	12%	–28%
31 Oct-1 Nov	YouGov	Well/Badly	30%	58%	—N/a	12%	–28%
24-25 Oct	YouGov	Well/Badly	29%	60%	—N/a	11%	–31%
17-18 Oct	YouGov	Well/Badly	31%	57%	—N/a	13%	–26%
12-15	Ipsos MORI	Satisfied/Dissatisfied	36%	49%	—N/a	15%	–13%
10-11 Oct	YouGov	Well/Badly	29%	59%	—N/a	11%	–30%
3-4 Oct	YouGov	Well/Badly	29%	60%	—N/a	10%	–31%
26-27 Sep	YouGov	Well/Badly	30%	60%	—N/a	10%	–30%
19-20 Sep	YouGov	Well/Badly	22%	67%	—N/a	11%	–45%
12-13 Sep	YouGov	Well/Badly	21%	67%	—N/a	12%	–46%
7-9 Sep	Ipsos MORI	Satisfied/Dissatisfied	24%	60%	—N/a	16%	–36%
5-6 Sep	YouGov	Well/Badly	21%	67%	—N/a	12%	–46%
30-31 Aug	YouGov	Well/Badly	24%	63%	—N/a	14%	–39%
22-23 Aug	YouGov	Well/Badly	20%	68%	—N/a	12%	–48%
15-16 Aug	YouGov	Well/Badly	23%	65%	—N/a	12%	–42%
10-12 Aug	Ipsos MORI	Satisfied/Dissatisfied	28%	55%	—N/a	17%	–27%
8-9 Aug	YouGov	Well/Badly	25%	61%	—N/a	14%	–36%
1-2 Aug	YouGov	Well/Badly	23%	65%	—N/a	12%	–41%
25-26 Jul	YouGov	Well/Badly	25%	62%	—N/a	13%	–37%
18-19 Jul	YouGov	Well/Badly	26%	61%	—N/a	14%	–35%
13-15 Jul	Ipsos MORI	Satisfied/Dissatisfied	30%	56%	—N/a	14%	–26%
11-12 Jul	YouGov	Well/Badly	27%	62%	—N/a	11%	–35%
4-5 Jul	YouGov	Well/Badly	26%	60%	—N/a	14%	–34%
27-28 Jun	YouGov	Well/Badly	28%	59%	—N/a	12%	–31%
20-21 Jun	YouGov	Well/Badly	26%	59%	—N/a	15%	–33%
13-14 Jun	YouGov	Well/Badly	26%	61%	—N/a	13%	–35%
8-10 Jun	Ipsos MORI	Satisfied/Dissatisfied	31%	52%	—N/a	17%	–21%
6-7 Jun	YouGov	Well/Badly	27%	62%	—N/a	12%	–35%
30–31 May	YouGov	Well/Badly	27%	61%	—N/a	12%	–34%
23–24 May	YouGov	Well/Badly	30%	58%	—N/a	12%	–28%
16–17 May	YouGov	Well/Badly	27%	62%	—N/a	11%	–35%
11–13 May	Ipsos MORI	Satisfied/Dissatisfied	35%	49%	—N/a	16%	–14%
9–10 May	YouGov	Well/Badly	29%	58%	—N/a	12%	–29%
2 May	2013 United Kingdom local elections.						
2–3 May	YouGov	Well/Badly	29%	57%	—N/a	14%	–28%
25-26 Apr	YouGov	Well/Badly	29%	56%	—N/a	14%	–27%
18-19 Apr	YouGov	Well/Badly	29%	58%	—N/a	13%	–29%
13-15 Apr	Ipsos MORI	Satisfied/Dissatisfied	34%	50%	—N/a	16%	–16%
11-12 Apr	YouGov	Well/Badly	31%	56%	—N/a	12%	–25%
4-5 Apr	YouGov	Well/Badly	29%	59%	—N/a	13%	–30%
21-22 Mar	YouGov	Well/Badly	31%	56%	—N/a	12%	–25%
14-15 Mar	YouGov	Well/Badly	30%	55%	—N/a	14%	–25%
9-11 Mar	Ipsos MORI	Satisfied/Dissatisfied	32%	52%	—N/a	16%	–20%
7-8 Mar	YouGov	Well/Badly	27%	59%	—N/a	14%	–32%
28 Feb-1 Mar	YouGov	Well/Badly	28%	58%	—N/a	14%	–31%
21-22 Feb	YouGov	Well/Badly	32%	55%	—N/a	12%	–23%
14-15 Feb	YouGov	Well/Badly	31%	56%	—N/a	14%	–25%
9-11 Feb	Ipsos MORI	Satisfied/Dissatisfied	34%	45%	—N/a	21%	–11%
7-8 Feb	YouGov	Well/Badly	31%	53%	—N/a	14%	–20%
31 Jan-1 Feb	YouGov	Well/Badly	31%	56%	—N/a	13%	–25%
24-25 Jan	YouGov	Well/Badly	32%	58%	—N/a	10%	–26%
17-18 Jan	YouGov	Well/Badly	33%	55%	—N/a	12%	–22%
12-14 Jan	Ipsos MORI	Satisfied/Dissatisfied	36%	48%	—N/a	16%	–12%
10-11 Jan	YouGov	Well/Badly	34%	54%	—N/a	13%	–20%
3-4 Jan	YouGov	Well/Badly	31%	54%	—N/a	15%	–23%

==== 2012 ====
Date(s) conducted	Polling organisation/client	Question wording	Approve	Disapprove	Neither	Don't know	Net approval
20-21 Dec	YouGov	Well/Badly	33%	54%	—N/a	12%	–21%
13-14 Dec	YouGov	Well/Badly	33%	56%	—N/a	12%	–23%
8-10 Dec	Ipsos MORI	Satisfied/Dissatisfied	40%	43%	—N/a	17%	–3%
6-7 Dec	YouGov	Well/Badly	34%	55%	—N/a	11%	–21%
30 Nov-1 Dec	YouGov	Well/Badly	36%	51%	—N/a	13%	–15%
22-23 Nov	YouGov	Well/Badly	34%	54%	—N/a	13%	–20%
15-16 Nov	YouGov	Well/Badly	34%	55%	—N/a	12%	–21%
10-13 Nov	Ipsos MORI	Satisfied/Dissatisfied	40%	43%	—N/a	17%	–3%
8-9 Nov	YouGov	Well/Badly	34%	52%	—N/a	14%	–18%
1-2 Nov	YouGov	Well/Badly	32%	55%	—N/a	13%	–23%
25-26 Oct	YouGov	Well/Badly	36%	52%	—N/a	12%	–16%
20-24 Oct	Ipsos MORI	Satisfied/Dissatisfied	37%	49%	—N/a	14%	–12%
18-19 Oct	YouGov	Well/Badly	33%	51%	—N/a	15%	–18%
11-12 Oct	YouGov	Well/Badly	37%	51%	—N/a	12%	–14%
4-5 Oct	YouGov	Well/Badly	40%	49%	—N/a	12%	–9%
27-28 Sep	YouGov	Well/Badly	28%	57%	—N/a	14%	–29%
20-21 Sep	YouGov	Well/Badly	29%	58%	—N/a	14%	–29%
15-17 Sep	Ipsos MORI	Satisfied/Dissatisfied	38%	47%	—N/a	15%	–9%
13-14 Sep	YouGov	Well/Badly	30%	57%	—N/a	12%	–27%
6-7 Sep	YouGov	Well/Badly	32%	54%	—N/a	15%	–22%
30-31 Aug	YouGov	Well/Badly	29%	58%	—N/a	13%	–29%
23-24 Aug	YouGov	Well/Badly	30%	57%	—N/a	16%	–24%
16-17 Aug	YouGov	Well/Badly	27%	58%	—N/a	14%	–31%
11-13 Aug	Ipsos MORI	Satisfied/Dissatisfied	41%	43%	—N/a	16%	–2%
9-10 Aug	YouGov	Well/Badly	32%	53%	—N/a	15%	–21%
2-3 Aug	YouGov	Well/Badly	33%	54%	—N/a	12%	–21%
26-27 Jul	YouGov	Well/Badly	30%	57%	—N/a	13%	–27%
19-20 Jul	YouGov	Well/Badly	34%	54%	—N/a	13%	–20%
14-16 Jul	Ipsos MORI	Satisfied/Dissatisfied	33%	51%	—N/a	16%	–18%
12-13 Jul	YouGov	Well/Badly	34%	55%	—N/a	11%	–21%
5-6 Jul	YouGov	Well/Badly	32%	56%	—N/a	12%	–24%
28-29 Jun	YouGov	Well/Badly	32%	57%	—N/a	12%	–25%
21-22 Jun	YouGov	Well/Badly	30%	57%	—N/a	13%	–27%
14-15 Jun	YouGov	Well/Badly	31%	56%	—N/a	11%	–25%
9-11 Jun	Ipsos MORI	Satisfied/Dissatisfied	35%	48%	—N/a	17%	–13%
7-8 Jun	YouGov	Well/Badly	31%	57%	—N/a	13%	–26%
30 May-1 Jun	YouGov	Well/Badly	30%	58%	—N/a	12%	–28%
24–25 May	YouGov	Well/Badly	33%	56%	—N/a	12%	–23%
17–18 May	YouGov	Well/Badly	30%	57%	—N/a	13%	–27%
12–14 May	Ipsos MORI	Satisfied/Dissatisfied	34%	50%	—N/a	16%	–16%
10–11 May	YouGov	Well/Badly	32%	55%	—N/a	12%	–23%
3 May	2012 United Kingdom local elections.						
3–4 May	YouGov	Well/Badly	27%	60%	—N/a	13%	–33%
26-27 Apr	YouGov	Well/Badly	27%	65%	—N/a	9%	–38%
21-23 Apr	Ipsos MORI	Satisfied/Dissatisfied	34%	52%	—N/a	14%	–18%
19-20 Apr	YouGov	Well/Badly	21%	67%	—N/a	11%	–46%
12-13 Apr	YouGov	Well/Badly	22%	66%	—N/a	11%	–44%
30-31 Mar	YouGov	Well/Badly	24%	65%	—N/a	11%	–41%
22-23 Mar	YouGov	Well/Badly	25%	62%	—N/a	12%	–37%
17-19 Mar	Ipsos MORI	Satisfied/Dissatisfied	34%	52%	—N/a	14%	–18%
15-16 Mar	YouGov	Well/Badly	22%	67%	—N/a	11%	–45%
8-9 Mar	YouGov	Well/Badly	23%	61%	—N/a	15%	–38%
1-2 Mar	YouGov	Well/Badly	22%	66%	—N/a	12%	–44%
25-27 Feb	Ipsos MORI	Satisfied/Dissatisfied	30%	55%	—N/a	15%	–25%
23-24 Feb	YouGov	Well/Badly	22%	64%	—N/a	13%	–42%
16-17 Feb	YouGov	Well/Badly	23%	65%	—N/a	12%	–42%
9-10 Feb	YouGov	Well/Badly	23%	64%	—N/a	13%	–41%
2-3 Feb	YouGov	Well/Badly	22%	67%	—N/a	11%	–45%
26-27 Jan	YouGov	Well/Badly	20%	68%	—N/a	12%	–48%
21-23 Jan	Ipsos MORI	Satisfied/Dissatisfied	30%	56%	—N/a	14%	–26%
19-20 Jan	YouGov	Well/Badly	18%	71%	—N/a	11%	–53%
12-13 Jan	YouGov	Well/Badly	20%	69%	—N/a	11%	–49%
5-6 Jan	YouGov	Well/Badly	20%	66%	—N/a	13%	–46%

==== 2011 ====
Date(s) conducted	Polling organisation/client	Question wording	Approve	Disapprove	Neither	Don't know	Net approval
15-16 Dec	YouGov	Well/Badly	28%	59%	—N/a	13%	–31%
10-12 Dec	Ipsos MORI	Satisfied/Dissatisfied	34%	50%	—N/a	16%	–16%
8-9 Dec	YouGov	Well/Badly	27%	59%	—N/a	14%	–32%
1-2 Dec	YouGov	Well/Badly	26%	59%	—N/a	15%	–33%
24-25 Nov	YouGov	Well/Badly	26%	61%	—N/a	13%	–35%
19-21 Nov	Ipsos MORI	Satisfied/Dissatisfied	34%	49%	—N/a	17%	–15%
17-18 Nov	YouGov	Well/Badly	26%	60%	—N/a	15%	–34%
10-11 Nov	YouGov	Well/Badly	27%	57%	—N/a	16%	–30%
3-4 Nov	YouGov	Well/Badly	28%	56%	—N/a	16%	–28%
27-28 Oct	YouGov	Well/Badly	27%	59%	—N/a	15%	–32%
22-24 Oct	Ipsos MORI	Satisfied/Dissatisfied	34%	48%	—N/a	18%	–14%
20-21 Oct	YouGov	Well/Badly	27%	61%	—N/a	13%	–34%
13-14 Oct	YouGov	Well/Badly	28%	59%	—N/a	13%	–31%
6-7 Oct	YouGov	Well/Badly	27%	60%	—N/a	13%	–33%
29-30 Sep	YouGov	Well/Badly	28%	60%	—N/a	12%	–32%
22-23 Sep	YouGov	Well/Badly	26%	59%	—N/a	12%	–32%
15-16 Sep	YouGov	Well/Badly	28%	55%	—N/a	16%	–27%
10-12 Sep	Ipsos MORI	Satisfied/Dissatisfied	31%	47%	—N/a	22%	–16%
8-9 Sep	YouGov	Well/Badly	29%	55%	—N/a	15%	–26%
1-2 Sep	YouGov	Well/Badly	30%	54%	—N/a	16%	–24%
25-26 Aug	YouGov	Well/Badly	31%	54%	—N/a	15%	–23%
20-22 Aug	Ipsos MORI	Satisfied/Dissatisfied	36%	43%	—N/a	21%	–6%
18-19 Aug	YouGov	Well/Badly	33%	54%	—N/a	13%	–21%
11-12 Aug	YouGov	Well/Badly	34%	52%	—N/a	15%	–18%
4-5 Aug	YouGov	Well/Badly	32%	54%	—N/a	15%	–22%
28-29 Jul	YouGov	Well/Badly	34%	51%	—N/a	15%	–17%
21-22 Jul	YouGov	Well/Badly	35%	50%	—N/a	15%	–15%
16-18 Jul	Ipsos MORI	Satisfied/Dissatisfied	37%	44%	—N/a	19%	–7%
14-15 Jul	YouGov	Well/Badly	32%	53%	—N/a	15%	–21%
7-8 Jul	YouGov	Well/Badly	27%	55%	—N/a	17%	–28%
30 Jun-1 Jul	YouGov	Well/Badly	26%	60%	—N/a	14%	–34%
23-24 Jun	YouGov	Well/Badly	26%	58%	—N/a	15%	–32%
17-19 Jun	Ipsos MORI	Satisfied/Dissatisfied	34%	48%	—N/a	18%	–14%
16-17 Jun	YouGov	Well/Badly	26%	58%	—N/a	16%	–32%
9-10 Jun	YouGov	Well/Badly	30%	53%	—N/a	17%	–23%
2-3 Jun	YouGov	Well/Badly	32%	51%	—N/a	17%	–19%
26–27 May	YouGov	Well/Badly	31%	50%	—N/a	18%	–19%
20–24 May	Ipsos MORI	Satisfied/Dissatisfied	35%	43%	—N/a	22%	–8%
19–20 May	YouGov	Well/Badly	32%	51%	—N/a	17%	–19%
12–13 May	YouGov	Well/Badly	32%	53%	—N/a	15%	–21%
5 May	United Kingdom local elections. Also Scottish Parliament election and Welsh Assembly election.						
5–6 May	YouGov	Well/Badly	36%	48%	—N/a	16%	–12%
28-29 Apr	YouGov	Well/Badly	33%	49%	—N/a	18%	–16%
15-17 Apr	Ipsos MORI	Satisfied/Dissatisfied	41%	40%	—N/a	19%	+1%
14-15 Apr	YouGov	Well/Badly	31%	50%	—N/a	19%	–19%
7-8 Apr	YouGov	Well/Badly	33%	48%	—N/a	19%	–15%
31 Mar- 1 Apr	YouGov	Well/Badly	35%	48%	—N/a	18%	–13%
24-25 Mar	YouGov	Well/Badly	32%	47%	—N/a	20%	–15%
17-18 Mar	YouGov	Well/Badly	31%	47%	—N/a	19%	–13%
11-13 Mar	Ipsos MORI	Satisfied/Dissatisfied	37%	42%	—N/a	21%	–5%
10-11 Mar	YouGov	Well/Badly	32%	47%	—N/a	21%	–15%
3-4 Mar	YouGov	Well/Badly	33%	47%	—N/a	20%	–14%
24-25 Feb	YouGov	Well/Badly	32%	47%	—N/a	21%	–15%
18-20 Feb	Ipsos MORI	Satisfied/Dissatisfied	34%	43%	—N/a	23%	–9%
17-18 Feb	YouGov	Well/Badly	31%	47%	—N/a	22%	–16%
10-11 Feb	YouGov	Well/Badly	35%	45%	—N/a	19%	–10%
3-4 Feb	YouGov	Well/Badly	34%	45%	—N/a	21%	–11%
27-28 Jan	YouGov	Well/Badly	37%	43%	—N/a	21%	–6%
21-24 Jan	Ipsos MORI	Satisfied/Dissatisfied	37%	37%	—N/a	26%	+0%
20-21 Jan	YouGov	Well/Badly	33%	44%	—N/a	23%	–11%
13-14 Jan	YouGov	Well/Badly	33%	43%	—N/a	24%	–10%
6-7 Jan	YouGov	Well/Badly	28%	49%	—N/a	24%	–21%

==== 2010 ====
Date(s) conducted	Polling organisation/client	Question wording	Approve	Disapprove	Neither	Don't know	Net approval
16-17 Dec	YouGov	Well/Badly	30%	44%	—N/a	26%	–14%
10-12 Dec	Ipsos MORI	Satisfied/Dissatisfied	35%	34%	—N/a	31%	+1%
9-10 Dec	YouGov	Well/Badly	29%	44%	—N/a	28%	–15%
2-3 Dec	YouGov	Well/Badly	30%	44%	—N/a	27%	–14%
25-26 Nov	YouGov	Well/Badly	28%	37%	—N/a	35%	–9%
18-19 Nov	YouGov	Well/Badly	32%	31%	—N/a	37%	+1%
12-14 Nov	Ipsos MORI	Satisfied/Dissatisfied	38%	29%	—N/a	33%	+9%
11-12 Nov	YouGov	Well/Badly	33%	31%	—N/a	35%	+2%
4-5 Nov	YouGov	Well/Badly	35%	31%	—N/a	34%	+4%
28-29 Oct	YouGov	Well/Badly	34%	32%	—N/a	34%	+2%
21-22 Oct	YouGov	Well/Badly	35%	26%	—N/a	38%	+9%
15-17 Oct	Ipsos MORI	Satisfied/Dissatisfied	41%	22%	—N/a	37%	+19%
14-15 Oct	YouGov	Well/Badly	38%	20%	—N/a	42%	+18%
7-8 Oct	YouGov	Well/Badly	30%	22%	—N/a	47%	+8%
30 Sep-1 Oct	YouGov	Well/Badly	32%	20%	—N/a	48%	+12%
26-27 Sep	YouGov	Well/Badly	43%	23%	—N/a	34%	+20%

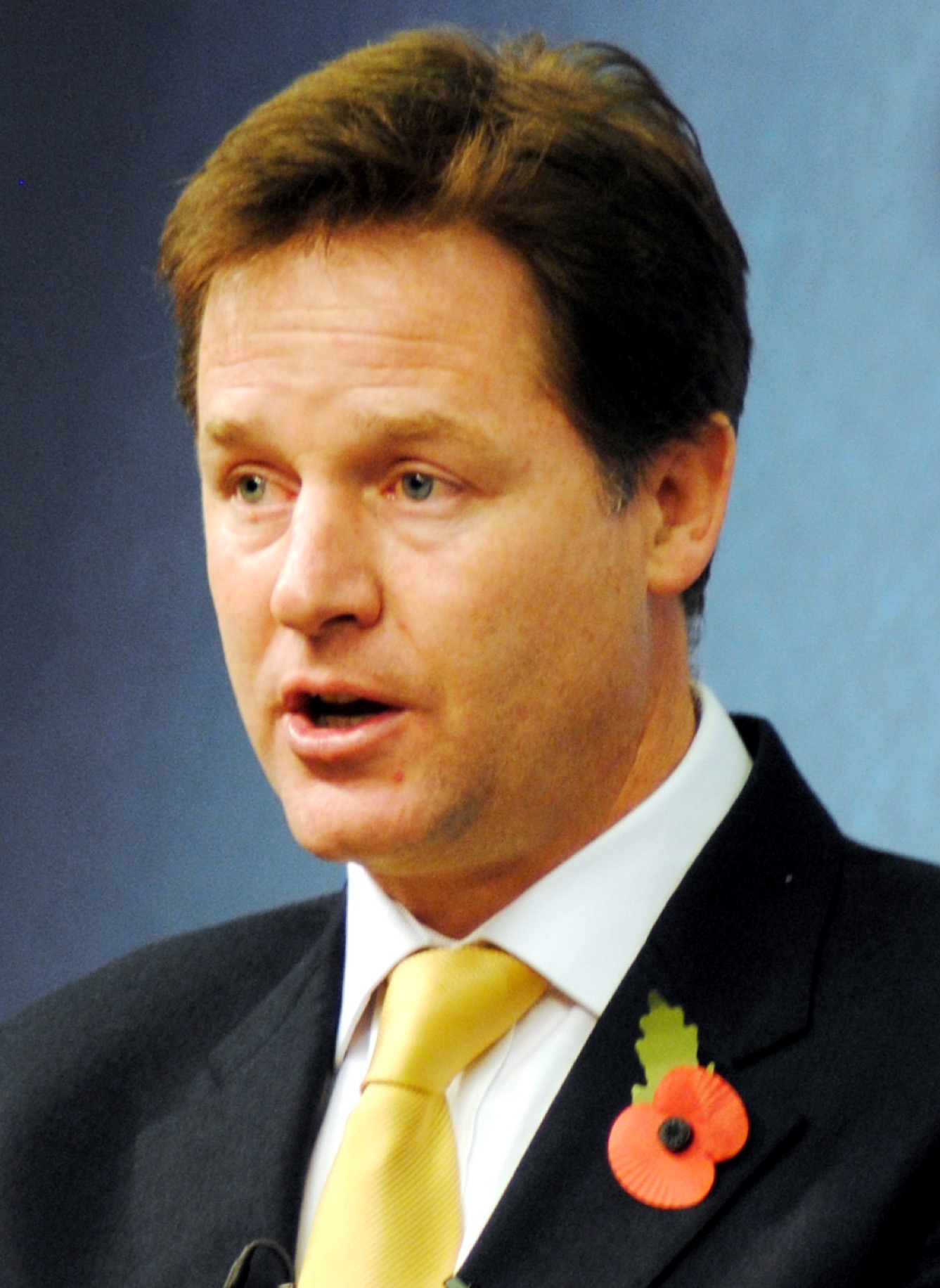
Nick Clegg, Leader of the Liberal Democrats and Deputy Prime Minister.

=== Nick Clegg ===
The following polls asked about voters' opinions on Nick Clegg, Leader of the Liberal Democrats and Deputy Prime Minister of the United Kingdom.

==== 2015 ====
Date(s) conducted	Polling organisation/client	Question wording	Approve	Disapprove	Neither	Don't know	Net approval
26-29 Apr	Ipsos MORI	Satisfied/Dissatisfied	34%	55%	—N/a	11%	–21%
17-18 Apr	YouGov	Well/Badly	27%	63%	—N/a	10%	–36%
12-15 Apr	Ipsos MORI	Satisfied/Dissatisfied	27%	58%	—N/a	15%	–31%
10-11 Apr	YouGov	Well/Badly	26%	63%	—N/a	11%	–37%
3-4 Apr	YouGov	Well/Badly	29%	62%	—N/a	10%	–33%
2 Apr	Seven-way Leaders' Debate on ITV						
27-28 Mar	YouGov	Well/Badly	24%	64%	—N/a	13%	–40%
19-20 Mar	YouGov	Well/Badly	21%	68%	—N/a	11%	–47%
12-13 Mar	YouGov	Well/Badly	18%	70%	—N/a	10%	–52%
8-11 Mar	Ipsos MORI	Satisfied/Dissatisfied	26%	62%	—N/a	12%	–36%
5-6 Mar	YouGov	Well/Badly	19%	71%	—N/a	11%	–52%
26-27 Feb	YouGov	Well/Badly	19%	71%	—N/a	11%	–52%
19-20 Feb	YouGov	Well/Badly	19%	70%	—N/a	11%	–51%
12-13 Feb	YouGov	Well/Badly	19%	71%	—N/a	10%	–52%
10-12 Feb	Ipsos MORI	Satisfied/Dissatisfied	23%	64%	—N/a	13%	–41%
5-6 Feb	YouGov	Well/Badly	16%	73%	—N/a	11%	–57%
29-30 Jan	YouGov	Well/Badly	19%	70%	—N/a	11%	–51%
22-23 Jan	YouGov	Well/Badly	17%	72%	—N/a	11%	–55%
15-16 Jan	YouGov	Well/Badly	18%	72%	—N/a	10%	–54%
11-13 Jan	Ipsos MORI	Satisfied/Dissatisfied	25%	64%	—N/a	11%	–39%
8-9 Jan	YouGov	Well/Badly	17%	72%	—N/a	12%	–55%

==== 2014 ====
Date(s) conducted	Polling organisation/client	Question wording	Approve	Disapprove	Neither	Don't know	Net approval
18-19 Dec	YouGov	Well/Badly	17%	73%	—N/a	11%	–56%
13-15 Dec	Ipsos MORI	Satisfied/Dissatisfied	24%	64%	—N/a	12%	–40%
11-12 Dec	YouGov	Well/Badly	15%	74%	—N/a	11%	–59%
4-5 Dec	YouGov	Well/Badly	15%	74%	—N/a	11%	–59%
27-28 Nov	YouGov	Well/Badly	16%	75%	—N/a	9%	–59%
20-21 Nov	YouGov	Well/Badly	17%	74%	—N/a	9%	–57%
13-14 Nov	YouGov	Well/Badly	16%	74%	—N/a	9%	–58%
8-10 Nov	Ipsos MORI	Satisfied/Dissatisfied	26%	62%	—N/a	12%	–36%
6-7 Nov	YouGov	Well/Badly	15%	75%	—N/a	10%	–60%
30-31 Oct	YouGov	Well/Badly	18%	72%	—N/a	9%	–54%
23-24 Oct	YouGov	Well/Badly	17%	75%	—N/a	8%	–58%
16-17 Oct	YouGov	Well/Badly	17%	74%	—N/a	9%	–57%
11-14 Oct	Ipsos MORI	Satisfied/Dissatisfied	25%	62%	—N/a	13%	–37%
9-10 Oct	YouGov	Well/Badly	19%	73%	—N/a	8%	–54%
2-3 Oct	YouGov	Well/Badly	16%	74%	—N/a	10%	–58%
25-26 Sep	YouGov	Well/Badly	16%	75%	—N/a	10%	–59%
19 Sep	"No" wins the Scottish independence referendum.						
18-19 Sep	YouGov	Well/Badly	16%	75%	—N/a	9%	–59%
11-12 Sep	YouGov	Well/Badly	17%	74%	—N/a	10%	–57%
6-9 Sep	Ipsos MORI	Satisfied/Dissatisfied	21%	66%	—N/a	13%	–45%
4-5 Sep	YouGov	Well/Badly	17%	73%	—N/a	10%	–56%
28-29 Aug	YouGov	Well/Badly	14%	75%	—N/a	10%	–61%
21-22 Aug	YouGov	Well/Badly	17%	73%	—N/a	10%	–56%
14-15 Aug	YouGov	Well/Badly	15%	73%	—N/a	11%	–58%
9-11 Aug	Ipsos MORI	Satisfied/Dissatisfied	26%	64%	—N/a	10%	–38%
7-8 Aug	YouGov	Well/Badly	17%	74%	—N/a	10%	–57%
31 Jul-1 Aug	YouGov	Well/Badly	16%	74%	—N/a	11%	–58%
24-25 Jul	YouGov	Well/Badly	17%	73%	—N/a	10%	–56%
17-18 Jul	YouGov	Well/Badly	15%	75%	—N/a	10%	–60%
12-15 Jul	Ipsos MORI	Satisfied/Dissatisfied	23%	65%	—N/a	12%	–42%
10-11 Jul	YouGov	Well/Badly	15%	74%	—N/a	11%	–59%
3-4 Jul	YouGov	Well/Badly	16%	75%	—N/a	9%	–59%
26-27 Jun	YouGov	Well/Badly	13%	76%	—N/a	10%	–63%
19-20 Jun	YouGov	Well/Badly	13%	76%	—N/a	10%	–63%
14-17 Jun	Ipsos MORI	Satisfied/Dissatisfied	25%	63%	—N/a	12%	–38%
12-13 Jun	YouGov	Well/Badly	16%	77%	—N/a	8%	–61%
5-6 Jun	YouGov	Well/Badly	14%	78%	—N/a	9%	–64%
29–30 May	YouGov	Well/Badly	13%	78%	—N/a	9%	–65%
22 May	2014 United Kingdom local elections.						
22–23 May	YouGov	Well/Badly	18%	74%	—N/a	9%	–56%
15–16 May	YouGov	Well/Badly	18%	73%	—N/a	8%	–55%
10–12 May	Ipsos MORI	Satisfied/Dissatisfied	23%	66%	—N/a	11%	–43%
8–9 May	YouGov	Well/Badly	17%	73%	—N/a	11%	–56%
1–2 May	YouGov	Well/Badly	18%	72%	—N/a	10%	–54%
24-25 Apr	YouGov	Well/Badly	18%	72%	—N/a	10%	–54%
10-11 Apr	YouGov	Well/Badly	19%	70%	—N/a	11%	–51%
5-7 Apr	Ipsos MORI	Satisfied/Dissatisfied	29%	63%	—N/a	8%	–34%
3-4 Apr	YouGov	Well/Badly	19%	70%	—N/a	10%	–51%
27-28 Mar	YouGov	Well/Badly	22%	68%	—N/a	9%	–46%
20-21 Mar	YouGov	Well/Badly	23%	67%	—N/a	11%	–44%
13-14 Mar	YouGov	Well/Badly	18%	71%	—N/a	11%	–53%
8-12 Mar	Ipsos MORI	Satisfied/Dissatisfied	29%	60%	—N/a	11%	–31%
6-7 Mar	YouGov	Well/Badly	20%	71%	—N/a	10%	–51%
27-28 Feb	YouGov	Well/Badly	19%	70%	—N/a	10%	–51%
20-21 Feb	YouGov	Well/Badly	18%	72%	—N/a	10%	–54%
13-14 Feb	YouGov	Well/Badly	19%	72%	—N/a	10%	–53%
9-10 Feb	YouGov	Well/Badly	19%	72%	—N/a	10%	–53%
1-3 Feb	Ipsos MORI	Satisfied/Dissatisfied	25%	64%	—N/a	11%	–39%
30-31 Jan	YouGov	Well/Badly	19%	71%	—N/a	10%	–52%
23-24 Jan	YouGov	Well/Badly	17%	75%	—N/a	7%	–58%
16-17 Jan	YouGov	Well/Badly	20%	71%	—N/a	10%	–51%
11-14 Jan	Ipsos MORI	Satisfied/Dissatisfied	29%	57%	—N/a	14%	–28%
9-10 Jan	YouGov	Well/Badly	19%	70%	—N/a	11%	–51%

==== 2013 ====
Date(s) conducted	Polling organisation/client	Question wording	Approve	Disapprove	Neither	Don't know	Net approval
12-13 Dec	YouGov	Well/Badly	17%	71%	—N/a	11%	–54%
7-9 Dec	Ipsos MORI	Satisfied/Dissatisfied	28%	57%	—N/a	13%	–29%
5-6 Dec	YouGov	Well/Badly	20%	68%	—N/a	11%	–48%
28-29 Nov	YouGov	Well/Badly	19%	69%	—N/a	12%	–50%
21-22 Nov	YouGov	Well/Badly	20%	70%	—N/a	10%	–50%
14-15 Nov	YouGov	Well/Badly	18%	72%	—N/a	10%	–54%
9-11 Nov	Ipsos MORI	Satisfied/Dissatisfied	22%	65%	—N/a	13%	–43%
7-8 Nov	YouGov	Well/Badly	18%	72%	—N/a	10%	–54%
31 Oct-1 Nov	YouGov	Well/Badly	19%	69%	—N/a	12%	–50%
24-25 Oct	YouGov	Well/Badly	19%	71%	—N/a	10%	–52%
17-18 Oct	YouGov	Well/Badly	20%	68%	—N/a	12%	–48%
12-15 Oct	Ipsos MORI	Satisfied/Dissatisfied	31%	57%	—N/a	12%	–26%
10-11 Oct	YouGov	Well/Badly	21%	69%	—N/a	10%	–48%
3-4 Oct	YouGov	Well/Badly	23%	68%	—N/a	9%	–45%
26-27 Sep	YouGov	Well/Badly	21%	69%	—N/a	10%	–48%
19-20 Sep	YouGov	Well/Badly	22%	68%	—N/a	10%	–46%
12-13 Sep	YouGov	Well/Badly	19%	69%	—N/a	12%	–50%
7-9 Sep	Ipsos MORI	Satisfied/Dissatisfied	24%	64%	—N/a	12%	–40%
5-6 Sep	YouGov	Well/Badly	18%	71%	—N/a	11%	–53%
30-31 Aug	YouGov	Well/Badly	20%	67%	—N/a	13%	–47%
22-23 Aug	YouGov	Well/Badly	19%	72%	—N/a	10%	–53%
15-16 Aug	YouGov	Well/Badly	21%	68%	—N/a	11%	–47%
10-12 Aug	Ipsos MORI	Satisfied/Dissatisfied	27%	62%	—N/a	11%	–35%
8-9 Aug	YouGov	Well/Badly	18%	71%	—N/a	11%	–53%
1-2 Aug	YouGov	Well/Badly	19%	72%	—N/a	10%	–53%
25-26 Jul	YouGov	Well/Badly	20%	69%	—N/a	11%	–49%
18-19 Jul	YouGov	Well/Badly	18%	69%	—N/a	12%	–51%
13-15 Aug	Ipsos MORI	Satisfied/Dissatisfied	27%	61%	—N/a	12%	–34%
11-12 Jul	YouGov	Well/Badly	18%	71%	—N/a	11%	–53%
4-5 Jul	YouGov	Well/Badly	19%	70%	—N/a	11%	–51%
27-28 Jun	YouGov	Well/Badly	21%	70%	—N/a	10%	–49%
20-21 Jun	YouGov	Well/Badly	19%	71%	—N/a	11%	–52%
13-14 Jun	YouGov	Well/Badly	19%	71%	—N/a	10%	–52%
8-10 Jun	Ipsos MORI	Satisfied/Dissatisfied	27%	61%	—N/a	12%	–35%
6-7 Jun	YouGov	Well/Badly	19%	72%	—N/a	9%	–53%
30–31 May	YouGov	Well/Badly	17%	74%	—N/a	9%	–57%
23–24 May	YouGov	Well/Badly	16%	75%	—N/a	8%	–59%
16–17 May	YouGov	Well/Badly	16%	77%	—N/a	7%	–61%
11–13 May	Ipsos MORI	Satisfied/Dissatisfied	26%	63%	—N/a	11%	–36%
9–10 May	YouGov	Well/Badly	19%	74%	—N/a	8%	–55%
2 May	2013 United Kingdom local elections.						
2–3 May	YouGov	Well/Badly	18%	72%	—N/a	10%	–54%
25-26 Apr	YouGov	Well/Badly	21%	69%	—N/a	10%	–48%
18-19 Apr	YouGov	Well/Badly	21%	69%	—N/a	11%	–48%
13-15 Apr	Ipsos MORI	Satisfied/Dissatisfied	21%	65%	—N/a	14%	–44%
11-12 Apr	YouGov	Well/Badly	18%	72%	—N/a	9%	–54%
4-5 Apr	YouGov	Well/Badly	19%	73%	—N/a	8%	–54%
21-22 Mar	YouGov	Well/Badly	21%	71%	—N/a	8%	–50%
14-15 Mar	YouGov	Well/Badly	18%	72%	—N/a	10%	–54%
9-11 Mar	Ipsos MORI	Satisfied/Dissatisfied	22%	65%	—N/a	12%	–43%
7-8 Mar	YouGov	Well/Badly	18%	71%	—N/a	11%	–53%
28 Feb-1 Mar	YouGov	Well/Badly	17%	74%	—N/a	9%	–57%
21-22 Feb	YouGov	Well/Badly	19%	72%	—N/a	9%	–53%
14-15 Feb	YouGov	Well/Badly	19%	72%	—N/a	10%	–53%
9-11 Feb	Ipsos MORI	Satisfied/Dissatisfied	24%	64%	—N/a	12%	–40%
7-8 Feb	YouGov	Well/Badly	20%	72%	—N/a	8%	–52%
31 Jan-1 Feb	YouGov	Well/Badly	20%	71%	—N/a	9%	–51%
24-25 Jan	YouGov	Well/Badly	20%	71%	—N/a	9%	–51%
17-18 Jan	YouGov	Well/Badly	22%	69%	—N/a	9%	–47%
12-14 Jan	Ipsos MORI	Satisfied/Dissatisfied	28%	61%	—N/a	11%	–33%
10-11 Jan	YouGov	Well/Badly	23%	68%	—N/a	9%	–45%
3-4 Jan	YouGov	Well/Badly	18%	72%	—N/a	10%	–54%

==== 2012 ====
Date(s) conducted	Polling organisation/client	Question wording	Approve	Disapprove	Neither	Don't know	Net approval
20-21 Dec	YouGov	Well/Badly	18%	74%	—N/a	8%	–56%
13-14 Dec	YouGov	Well/Badly	19%	75%	—N/a	7%	–56%
8-10 Dec	Ipsos MORI	Satisfied/Dissatisfied	27%	60%	—N/a	13%	–33%
6-7 Dec	YouGov	Well/Badly	18%	74%	—N/a	8%	–56%
30 Nov-1 Dec	YouGov	Well/Badly	19%	73%	—N/a	8%	–54%
22-23 Nov	YouGov	Well/Badly	19%	73%	—N/a	8%	–54%
15-16 Nov	YouGov	Well/Badly	18%	73%	—N/a	8%	–55%
10-13 Nov	Ipsos MORI	Satisfied/Dissatisfied	27%	59%	—N/a	14%	–32%
8-9 Nov	YouGov	Well/Badly	18%	73%	—N/a	9%	–55%
1-2 Nov	YouGov	Well/Badly	19%	72%	—N/a	9%	–53%
25-26 Oct	YouGov	Well/Badly	19%	72%	—N/a	9%	–53%
20-24 Oct	Ipsos MORI	Satisfied/Dissatisfied	23%	68%	—N/a	9%	–45%
18-19 Oct	YouGov	Well/Badly	17%	73%	—N/a	10%	–56%
11-12 Oct	YouGov	Well/Badly	17%	75%	—N/a	8%	–58%
4-5 Oct	YouGov	Well/Badly	16%	77%	—N/a	7%	–61%
27-28 Sep	YouGov	Well/Badly	15%	76%	—N/a	8%	–61%
20-21 Sep	YouGov	Well/Badly	15%	78%	—N/a	8%	–63%
15-17 Sep	Ipsos MORI	Satisfied/Dissatisfied	23%	66%	—N/a	11%	–43%
13-14 Sep	YouGov	Well/Badly	15%	76%	—N/a	9%	–61%
6-7 Sep	YouGov	Well/Badly	16%	74%	—N/a	10%	–58%
30-31 Aug	YouGov	Well/Badly	18%	74%	—N/a	8%	–56%
23-24 Aug	YouGov	Well/Badly	17%	74%	—N/a	10%	–57%
16-17 Aug	YouGov	Well/Badly	17%	73%	—N/a	9%	56%
11-17 Sep	Ipsos MORI	Satisfied/Dissatisfied	31%	58%	—N/a	11%	–27%
9-10 Aug	YouGov	Well/Badly	17%	73%	—N/a	10%	–56%
2-3 Aug	YouGov	Well/Badly	18%	73%	—N/a	8%	–55%
26-27 Jul	YouGov	Well/Badly	18%	72%	—N/a	9%	–54%
19-20 Jul	YouGov	Well/Badly	19%	72%	—N/a	9%	–53%
14-16 Jul	Ipsos MORI	Satisfied/Dissatisfied	26%	64%	—N/a	10%	–38%
12-13 Jul	YouGov	Well/Badly	16%	75%	—N/a	8%	–59%
28-29 Jun	YouGov	Well/Badly	18%	72%	—N/a	9%	–54%
21-22 Jun	YouGov	Well/Badly	19%	72%	—N/a	9%	–53%
14-15 Jun	YouGov	Well/Badly	18%	73%	—N/a	9%	–55%
9-11 Jun	Ipsos MORI	Satisfied/Dissatisfied	26%	63%	—N/a	11%	–36%
7-8 Jun	YouGov	Well/Badly	18%	72%	—N/a	9%	–54%
30 May-1 Jun	YouGov	Well/Badly	18%	73%	—N/a	8%	–55%
24–25 May	YouGov	Well/Badly	18%	73%	—N/a	9%	–55%
17–18 May	YouGov	Well/Badly	17%	73%	—N/a	10%	–56%
12–14 May	Ipsos MORI	Satisfied/Dissatisfied	25%	64%	—N/a	11%	–39%
10–11 May	YouGov	Well/Badly	18%	72%	—N/a	9%	–54%
3 May	2012 United Kingdom local elections.						
3–4 May	YouGov	Well/Badly	17%	74%	—N/a	9%	–57%
26-27 Apr	YouGov	Well/Badly	20%	73%	—N/a	7%	–53%
21-23 Apr	Ipsos MORI	Satisfied/Dissatisfied	30%	61%	—N/a	9%	–31%
19-20 Apr	YouGov	Well/Badly	19%	74%	—N/a	8%	–55%
12-13 Apr	YouGov	Well/Badly	19%	73%	—N/a	9%	–54%
30-31 Mar	YouGov	Well/Badly	19%	72%	—N/a	9%	–53%
22-23 Mar	YouGov	Well/Badly	23%	69%	—N/a	8%	–46%
17-19 Mar	Ipsos MORI	Satisfied/Dissatisfied	32%	59%	—N/a	9%	–27%
15-16 Mar	YouGov	Well/Badly	23%	69%	—N/a	8%	–46%
8-9 Mar	YouGov	Well/Badly	23%	67%	—N/a	11%	–44%
1-2 Mar	YouGov	Well/Badly	22%	69%	—N/a	9%	–47%
25-27 Feb	Ipsos MORI	Satisfied/Dissatisfied	28%	60%	—N/a	12%	–32%
23-24 Feb	YouGov	Well/Badly	23%	67%	—N/a	10%	–44%
16-17 Feb	YouGov	Well/Badly	21%	70%	—N/a	9%	–49%
9-10 Feb	YouGov	Well/Badly	24%	67%	—N/a	9%	–43%
2-3 Feb	YouGov	Well/Badly	22%	69%	—N/a	9%	–47%
26-27 Jan	YouGov	Well/Badly	26%	64%	—N/a	10%	–38%
21-23 Jan	Ipsos MORI	Satisfied/Dissatisfied	32%	55%	—N/a	13%	–23%
19-20 Jan	YouGov	Well/Badly	21%	71%	—N/a	9%	–50%
12-13 Jan	YouGov	Well/Badly	19%	73%	—N/a	8%	–54%
5-6 Jan	YouGov	Well/Badly	21%	70%	—N/a	9%	–49%

==== 2011 ====
Date(s) conducted	Polling organisation/client	Question wording	Approve	Disapprove	Neither	Don't know	Net approval
15-16 Dec	YouGov	Satisfied/Dissatisfied	18%	73%	—N/a	8%	–55%
10-12 Dec	Ipsos MORI	Well/Badly	33%	55%	—N/a	12%	–22%
8-9 Dec	YouGov	Well/Badly	25%	65%	—N/a	10%	–40%
1-2 Dec	YouGov	Well/Badly	22%	67%	—N/a	11%	–45%
24-25 Nov	YouGov	Well/Badly	25%	66%	—N/a	9%	–41%
19-21 Nov	Ipsos MORI	Satisfied/Dissatisfied	29%	59%	—N/a	12%	–30%
17-18 Nov	YouGov	Well/Badly	24%	65%	—N/a	11%	–41%
10-11 Nov	YouGov	Well/Badly	20%	69%	—N/a	11%	–49%
3-4 Nov	YouGov	Well/Badly	24%	66%	—N/a	11%	–42%
27-28 Oct	YouGov	Well/Badly	23%	67%	—N/a	11%	–44%
22-24 Oct	Ipsos MORI	Satisfied/Dissatisfied	30%	58%	—N/a	12%	–28%
20-21 Oct	YouGov	Well/Badly	24%	67%	—N/a	9%	–43%
13-14 Oct	YouGov	Well/Badly	22%	68%	—N/a	10%	–46%
6-7 Oct	YouGov	Well/Badly	24%	68%	—N/a	8%	–44%
29-30 Sep	YouGov	Well/Badly	25%	66%	—N/a	9%	–41%
22-23 Sep	YouGov	Well/Badly	25%	65%	—N/a	10%	–40%
15-16 Sep	YouGov	Well/Badly	24%	66%	—N/a	10%	–42%
10-12 Sep	Ipsos MORI	Satisfied/Dissatisfied	31%	59%	—N/a	10%	–28%
8-9 Sep	YouGov	Well/Badly	22%	67%	—N/a	10%	–45%
1-2 Sep	YouGov	Well/Badly	24%	66%	—N/a	10%	–42%
25-26 Aug	YouGov	Well/Badly	23%	68%	—N/a	10%	–45%
20-22 Aug	Ipsos MORI	Satisfied/Dissatisfied	31%	56%	—N/a	13%	–25%
18-19 Aug	YouGov	Well/Badly	22%	69%	—N/a	8%	–47%
11-12 Aug	YouGov	Well/Badly	24%	66%	—N/a	10%	–42%
4-5 Aug	YouGov	Well/Badly	20%	70%	—N/a	10%	–50%
28-29 Jul	YouGov	Well/Badly	24%	66%	—N/a	11%	–42%
21-22 Jul	YouGov	Well/Badly	24%	66%	—N/a	10%	–42%
16-18 Jul	Ipsos MORI	Satisfied/Dissatisfied	31%	56%	—N/a	13%	–25%
14-15 Jul	YouGov	Well/Badly	24%	66%	—N/a	10%	–42%
7-8 Jul	YouGov	Well/Badly	20%	69%	—N/a	10%	–49%
30 Jun-1 Jul	YouGov	Well/Badly	20%	71%	—N/a	9%	–51%
23-24 Jun	YouGov	Well/Badly	20%	71%	—N/a	8%	–51%
17-19 Jun	Ipsos MORI	Satisfied/Dissatisfied	32%	58%	—N/a	10%	–26%
16-17 Jun	YouGov	Well/Badly	22%	68%	—N/a	9%	–46%
9-10 Jun	YouGov	Well/Badly	21%	70%	—N/a	9%	–49%
2-3 Jun	YouGov	Well/Badly	18%	74%	—N/a	8%	–56%
26–27 May	YouGov	Well/Badly	22%	70%	—N/a	8%	–48%
20–24 May	Ipsos MORI	Satisfied/Dissatisfied	29%	61%	—N/a	10%	–32%
19–20 May	YouGov	Well/Badly	19%	75%	—N/a	6%	–56%
12–13 May	YouGov	Well/Badly	21%	73%	—N/a	6%	–52%
5 May	United Kingdom local elections. Also Scottish Parliament election and Welsh Assembly election.						
5–6 May	YouGov	Well/Badly	21%	71%	—N/a	8%	–50%
28-29 Apr	YouGov	Well/Badly	23%	68%	—N/a	8%	–45%
15-17 Apr	Ipsos MORI	Satisfied/Dissatisfied	35%	53%	—N/a	12%	–18%
14-15 Apr	YouGov	Well/Badly	24%	68%	—N/a	9%	–44%
7-8 Apr	YouGov	Well/Badly	26%	65%	—N/a	9%	–39%
31 Mar- 1 Apr	YouGov	Well/Badly	25%	64%	—N/a	11%	–39%
24-25 Mar	YouGov	Well/Badly	28%	63%	—N/a	9%	–35%
17-18 Mar	YouGov	Well/Badly	25%	66%	—N/a	10%	–34%
11-13 Mar	Ipsos MORI	Satisfied/Dissatisfied	34%	56%	—N/a	10%	–22%
10-11 Mar	YouGov	Well/Badly	30%	62%	—N/a	9%	–46%
3-4 Mar	YouGov	Well/Badly	25%	67%	—N/a	9%	–42%
24-25 Feb	YouGov	Well/Badly	28%	62%	—N/a	9%	–34%
18-20 Feb	Ipsos MORI	Satisfied/Dissatisfied	34%	57%	—N/a	9%	–23%
17-18 Feb	YouGov	Well/Badly	28%	62%	—N/a	10%	–34%
10-11 Feb	YouGov	Well/Badly	30%	62%	—N/a	8%	–32%
3-4 Feb	YouGov	Well/Badly	31%	60%	—N/a	9%	–29%
27-28 Jan	YouGov	Well/Badly	34%	57%	—N/a	8%	–23%
21-24 Jan	Ipsos MORI	Satisfied/Dissatisfied	32%	55%	—N/a	13%	–23%
20-21 Jan	YouGov	Well/Badly	28%	62%	—N/a	11%	–34%
13-14 Jan	YouGov	Well/Badly	30%	60%	—N/a	10%	–30%
6-7 Jan	YouGov	Well/Badly	30%	60%	—N/a	9%	–30%

==== 2010 ====
Date(s) conducted	Polling organisation/client	Question wording	Approve	Disapprove	Neither	Don't know	Net approval
16-17 Dec	YouGov	Well/Badly	30%	60%	—N/a	9%	–30%
10-12 Dec	Ipsos MORI	Satisfied/Dissatisfied	38%	50%	—N/a	12%	–12%
9-10 Dec	YouGov	Well/Badly	31%	60%	—N/a	10%	–29%
2-3 Dec	YouGov	Well/Badly	33%	56%	—N/a	11%	–23%
25-26 Nov	YouGov	Well/Badly	32%	56%	—N/a	12%	–24%
18-19 Nov	YouGov	Well/Badly	38%	51%	—N/a	11%	–13%
12-14 Nov	Ipsos MORI	Satisfied/Dissatisfied	38%	49%	—N/a	13%	–11%
11-12 Nov	YouGov	Well/Badly	37%	51%	—N/a	12%	–14%
4-5 Nov	YouGov	Well/Badly	40%	50%	—N/a	10%	–10%
28-29 Oct	YouGov	Well/Badly	43%	46%	—N/a	11%	–3%
21-22 Oct	YouGov	Well/Badly	41%	45%	—N/a	14%	–4%
15-17 Oct	Ipsos MORI	Satisfied/Dissatisfied	45%	40%	—N/a	15%	+5%
14-15 Oct	YouGov	Well/Badly	41%	47%	—N/a	13%	–6%
7-8 Oct	YouGov	Well/Badly	46%	40%	—N/a	14%	+6%
30 Sep-1 Oct	YouGov	Well/Badly	44%	41%	—N/a	14%	+3%
26-27 Sep	YouGov	Well/Badly	46%	41%	—N/a	12%	+5%
23-24 Sep	YouGov	Well/Badly	48%	41%	—N/a	11%	+7%
16-17 Sep	YouGov	Well/Badly	44%	43%	—N/a	13%	+1%
10-12 Sep	Ipsos MORI	Satisfied/Dissatisfied	52%	35%	—N/a	13%	+17%
9-10 Sep	YouGov	Well/Badly	48%	38%	—N/a	14%	+10%
2-3 Sep	YouGov	Well/Badly	45%	43%	—N/a	12%	+2%
26-27 Aug	YouGov	Well/Badly	47%	41%	—N/a	12%	+6%
19-20 Aug	YouGov	Well/Badly	43%	43%	—N/a	12%	0%
12-13 Aug	YouGov	Well/Badly	46%	41%	—N/a	14%	+5%
5-6 Aug	YouGov	Well/Badly	48%	40%	—N/a	12%	+8%
29-30 Jul	YouGov	Well/Badly	46%	38%	—N/a	16%	+8%
23-25 Jul	Ipsos MORI	Satisfied/Dissatisfied	47%	34%	—N/a	19%	+13%
22-23 Jul	YouGov	Well/Badly	47%	38%	—N/a	15%	+9%
15-16 Jul	YouGov	Well/Badly	51%	35%	—N/a	13%	+16%
8-9 Jul	YouGov	Well/Badly	54%	32%	—N/a	14%	+22%
1-2 Jul	YouGov	Well/Badly	54%	33%	—N/a	13%	+21%
24-25 Jun	YouGov	Well/Badly	57%	30%	—N/a	12%	+27%
18-20 Jun	Ipsos MORI	Satisfied/Dissatisfied	53%	27%	—N/a	20%	+26%
17-18 Jun	YouGov	Well/Badly	62%	22%	—N/a	16%	+40%
10-11 Jun	YouGov	Well/Badly	59%	21%	—N/a	21%	+38%
3-4 Jun	YouGov	Well/Badly	61%	20%	—N/a	19%	+41%
27–28 May	YouGov	Well/Badly	62%	19%	—N/a	19%	+43%
20–21 May	YouGov	Well/Badly	61%	17%	—N/a	22%	+44%
13–14 May	YouGov	Well/Badly	46%	14%	—N/a	40%	+32%
7–8 May	YouGov	Well/Badly	72%	19%	—N/a	9%	+53%

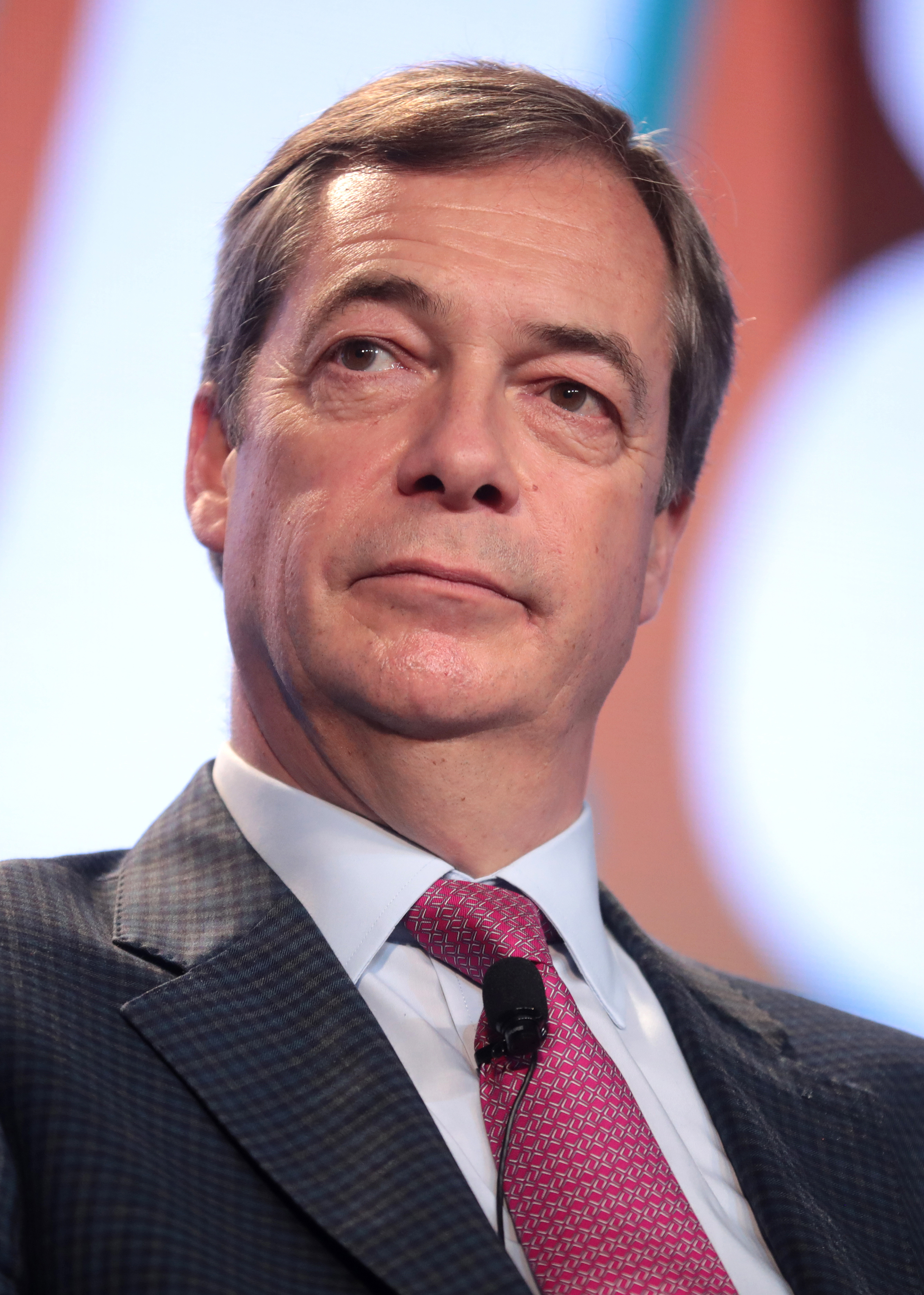
Nigel Farage, Leader of the UK Independence Party.

=== Nigel Farage ===
The following polls asked about voters' opinions on Nigel Farage, Leader of the UKIP. Polls commence mostly from March 2014.

==== 2015 ====
Date(s) conducted	Polling organisation/client	Question wording	Approve	Disapprove	Neither	Don't know	Net approval
26-29 Apr	Ipsos MORI	Satisfied/Dissatisfied	31%	56%	—N/a	13%	–25%
17-18 Apr	YouGov	Well/Badly	47%	41%	—N/a	11%	+6%
12-15 Apr	Ipsos MORI	Satisfied/Dissatisfied	30%	56%	—N/a	14%	–16%
10-11 Apr	YouGov	Well/Badly	47%	41%	—N/a	13%	+6%
3-4 Apr	YouGov	Well/Badly	53%	35%	—N/a	12%	+18%
2 Apr	Seven-way Leaders' Debate on ITV						
8-11 Mar	Ipsos MORI	Satisfied/Dissatisfied	35%	47%	—N/a	18%	–12%
10-12 Feb	Ipsos MORI	Satisfied/Dissatisfied	30%	53%	—N/a	17%	–23%
11-13 Jan	Ipsos MORI	Satisfied/Dissatisfied	35%	48%	—N/a	17%	–13%

==== 2014 ====
Date(s) conducted	Polling organisation/client	Question wording	Approve	Disapprove	Neither	Don't know	Net approval
13-15 Dec	Ipsos MORI	Satisfied/Dissatisfied	33%	53%	—N/a	20%	–20%
8-10 Nov	Ipsos MORI	Satisfied/Dissatisfied	38%	44%	—N/a	18%	–6%
11-14 Oct	Ipsos MORI	Satisfied/Dissatisfied	39%	43%	—N/a	18%	–4%
Oct 9-10	YouGov	Well/Badly	61%	26%	—N/a	13%	+35%
19 Sep	"No" wins the Scottish independence referendum.						
6-9 Sep	Ipsos MORI	Satisfied/Dissatisfied	39%	44%	—N/a	17%	–5%
9-11 Aug	Ipsos MORI	Satisfied/Dissatisfied	39%	43%	—N/a	18%	–4%
10-11 Jul	YouGov	Well/Badly	54%	30%	—N/a	17%	+24%
12-15 Jul	Ipsos MORI	Satisfied/Dissatisfied	38%	45%	—N/a	17%	–7%
14-17 Jun	Ipsos MORI	Satisfied/Dissatisfied	37%	45%	—N/a	18%	–8%
22 May	2014 United Kingdom local elections.						
15–16 May	YouGov	Well/Badly	47%	39%	—N/a	14%	+8%
10–12 May	Ipsos MORI	Satisfied/Dissatisfied	35%	46%	—N/a	19%	–11%
25-26 Apr	YouGov	Well/Badly	44%	20%	—N/a	36%	+24%
5-7 Apr	Ipsos MORI	Satisfied/Dissatisfied	40%	36%	—N/a	24%	+4%
3-4 Apr	YouGov	Well/Badly	53%	28%	—N/a	20%	+25%
27-28 Mar	YouGov	Well/Badly	50%	30%	—N/a	20%	+20%
8-12 Mar	Ipsos MORI	Satisfied/Dissatisfied	31%	41%	—N/a	28%	–10%
1-3 Feb	Ipsos MORI	Satisfied/Dissatisfied	31%	41%	—N/a	28%	–10%
11-14 Jan	Ipsos MORI	Satisfied/Dissatisfied	35%	47%	—N/a	18%	–2%

==== 2013 ====
Date(s) conducted	Polling organisation/client	Question wording	Approve	Disapprove	Neither	Don't know	Net approval
7-9 Dec	Ipsos MORI	Satisfied/Dissatisfied	29%	38%	—N/a	33%	–9%
9-11 Nov	Ipsos MORI	Satisfied/Dissatisfied	31%	41%	—N/a	28%	–10%
12-15 Oct	Ipsos MORI	Satisfied/Dissatisfied	36%	38%	—N/a	26%	–2%
7-9 Sep	Ipsos MORI	Satisfied/Dissatisfied	24%	36%	—N/a	40%	–12%
10-12 Aug	Ipsos MORI	Satisfied/Dissatisfied	28%	38%	—N/a	44%	–10%
13-15 Jul	Ipsos MORI	Satisfied/Dissatisfied	30%	35%	—N/a	35%	–5%
8-10 Jun	Ipsos MORI	Satisfied/Dissatisfied	31%	31%	—N/a	38%	+0%
11–13 May	Ipsos MORI	Satisfied/Dissatisfied	35%	29%	—N/a	36%	+6%
13-15 Apr	Ipsos MORI	Satisfied/Dissatisfied	34%	26%	—N/a	40%	+8%
9-11 Mar	Ipsos MORI	Satisfied/Dissatisfied	32%	26%	—N/a	42%	+6%

== See also ==
- Opinion polling for the 2015 United Kingdom general election
- 2015 United Kingdom general election
