= Jane Green (political scientist) =

Professor of political science

Jane Green FAcSS
- Education: Nuffield College, Oxford
- Scientific career
- Fields: Political science
- Workplaces: University of Manchester; University of Oxford

Jane Green FAcSS is a British political scientist and academic. She is Professor of Political Science and British Politics at the University of Oxford and a professorial fellow of Nuffield College. She is a specialist in public opinion and electoral behaviour, and has co-directed the British Election Study. She is the president of the British Polling Council.

== Academic work ==
Green received her PhD from Nuffield College, Oxford. She then joined the faculty at the University of Manchester, before moving to the University of Oxford.

In 2017, Green coauthored the book The Politics of Competence: Parties, Public Opinion and Voters with political scientist Will Jennings. In The Politics of Competence, Green and Jennings study how voters evaluate the competence of political parties on specific issues. They use data from the United Kingdom, the United States, Canada, Australia, and Germany to study three components of party issue competence: the reputation of parties on particular issues, voters' evaluations of parties on a particular issue, and how well voters think a party is performing overall.

Green was a coauthor, together with the other British Election Study team members, of the 2020 book Electoral Shocks: Understanding the Volatile Voter in a Turbulent World. The book uses data from the British Election Study to examine the state of British politics, and is organised around five shocks to British elections in recent years: the economic crisis, Brexit, immigration following the 2004 enlargement of the European Union, the Conservative–Liberal Democrat coalition agreement and the 2014 Scottish independence referendum.

Green has served on the editorial boards of prominent political science journals including Comparative Political Studies and Political Science Research and Methods. She has been the co-director of the British Election Study, and she was a member of the inquiry established by the British Polling Council and the Market Research Society into the failings of the polling relating to the British 2015 general election.

Green has provided election analysis for ITV News, including as part of their election night coverage. She has also done political analysis on BBC television and radio programs. She received the Research Communicator of the Year award from the Political Studies Association. In 2018, she was elected a Fellow of the Academy of Social Sciences.

== Selected works ==
- The Politics of Competence: Parties, Public Opinion and Voters, with Will Jennings (2017)
- Electoral Shocks: Understanding the Volatile Voter in a Turbulent World, coauthored with the British Election Study team (2020)
