= ICM Research =

ICM Research (now known as Walnut Social Research) is a public opinion research company that was founded in 1989. ICM is a subsidiary of Creston Insight, a marketing services company, and is a member of the British Polling Council under its new name Walnut Unlimited.

== History ==
When ICM was initially established, the initialism represented "Independent Communications and Marketing". However, the full name was never used in practice, with the company simply being known as "ICM". It was founded by three people: Nick Sparrow, who reinvented opinion polling after the 1992 polling miss to common acclaim, Steve Parker who focused on retail research, and Kate Turner, who conducted IT and telecoms research. All founders joined from Marplan, a market research company that ceased to exist just before ICM being set up.

FieldworkUK was set up as a face-to-face interviewing operation in 1999, followed by ICM Direct for telephone (and later, online data collection) in 2001.

ICM was sold to Creston Plc in 2008, after which the three founders left the business.

ICM Research re-branded in November 2014 to ICM Unlimited.

== Research ==
ICM conducted polling research for media publications such as The Guardian, The Scotsman and The Sunday Telegraph. It was credited by the British Polling Council with the most accurate prediction of both the 1997 and 2001 general elections, along with the 2010 general election. Other notable correct predictions include the 2011 AV referendum, which was correct to 1 decimal point, and its published online and telephone polls before the 2016 EU referendum.

Like all other polling companies, its prediction of the 2015 general election was wrong, predicting a 1-point victory for Labour rather than the outcome of a 7-point lead for the Conservatives.

The company has won various awards for its polling work, including both the Innovation in Research Methodology 2013 and the Market Research Society Silver Medal for Best Paper in the International Journal of Market Research (IJMR) 2013, won by Martin Boon" for his paper Predicting Elections - a Wisdom of Crowds Approach"; Nick Sparrow won the silver medal in 2007 for "Developing reliable online polls" and with John Turner in 1995/96 for "Messages from the spiral of silence: developing more accurate marketing information in a more uncertain political climate".

In 2014, research papers cover topics such as business banking, mobile commerce and retirement planning.

ICM was involved with the polling of the Scottish constituency in regard to the independence referendum poll that occurred on 18 September 2014. The BBC published the research conducted by ICM, in addition to other polling firms, as part of its "poll tracker" in the lead-up to the vote which resulted in Scotland remaining part of the UK.
