= Populus Ltd =

UK market research company

- Company type: Market research
- Founded: 2003, United Kingdom
- Headquarters: United Kingdom

Populus is a market research company in the United Kingdom formed in 2003.

Populus co-founded the British Polling Council in 2004 and regularly publishes opinion polls on voting intention and as well as other political and commercial issues. It is also a member of the Market Research Society.

Populus conduct telephone research using random digit dialing.

In 2020 Populus became part of Yonder Consulting.
