= British Polling Council =

Association of market research companies

- Abbreviation: BPC
- Formation: 2004
- Founders: Comres; ICM Research; Ipsos MORI; NOP; ORB International; TNS/System 3; YouGov
- Legal status: Active
- Members: 39
- President: Jane Green
- Website: www.britishpollingcouncil.org

The British Polling Council (BPC) is an association of market research companies whose opinion polls are regularly published or broadcast in media in the United Kingdom. The current President is Jane Green.

The BPC was established in 2004, twelve years after the perceived failure of opinion polls to come close to predicting the actual result of the 1992 general election. BPC members use a range of fieldwork methods (telephone, door-to-door, and internet) and statistical tools.

== Members ==
=== Founding members ===
The following organisations are founding members of the BPC:

- Ipsos (formerly Ipsos MORI)
- ORB International
- Savanta (formerly ComRes)
- Verian (formerly Kantar Public, originally TNS/System 3)
- Walnut Unlimited (formerly ICM Research)
- YouGov

NOP (now GfK) was a founding member, but is no longer a member as of 2018.

Populus (now Yonder Consulting) applied to be a founding member and the Yonder Consulting website claims that it was (e.g.), but its name was omitted from the BPC press release listing of founding members.

=== Other members ===
The following organisations are non-founding members of the BPC:

- 3Gem
- Adam Smith Insights
- Blue State
- BMG Research
- Bradshaw Advisory
- Censuswide
- Convergent Opinion
- Deltapoll
- Electoral Calculus
- Find Out Now
- Focaldata
- Freshwater Strategy
- Good Growth Foundation
- JL Partners
- LucidTalk
- Merlin Strategy
- More in Common
- Mortar Research
- Norstat (formerly Panelbase)
- Obsurvant
- Omnisis / We Think (Note: Omnisis and We Think have polled separately, but are listed together as a single member.)
- OnePoll
- Opinium
- Prolific
- Public First (Note: Public First is a subsidiary of Stonehaven Global Holdings Ltd (SHGH); its sister company Stonehaven also conducts opinion polling, but is not separately listed as a member.)
- Shared Voice
- Stack Data Strategy
- Strand Partners
- Survation
- Techne UK
- Trajectory Partnership
- Whitestone Insight
- Yonder Consulting (formerly Populus)

== See also ==
- Evaluation
- Quantitative research
- Psephology
- Social research
- Statistics
- Statistical survey
- Voodoo poll
- Elections in the United Kingdom
- Politics of the United Kingdom
- Market Research Society
