= Next United Kingdom general election in Scotland =

- On or before 15 August 2029
- All 57 Scottish seats in the House of Commons
Party	Leader	Last election
Labour	Andy Burnham	37
SNP	John Swinney (Note: Dave Doogan leads the SNP in the House of Commons.)	9
Liberal Democrats	Ed Davey	6
Conservative	Kemi Badenoch	5
Incumbent Prime Minister
Andy Burnham; Labour

The next United Kingdom general election must be held no later than 15 August 2029, and all 57 Scottish Westminster seats will be contested. The election will determine the composition of the House of Commons, which in turn determines the government of the United Kingdom.

== Date ==
The Dissolution and Calling of Parliament Act 2022 mandates that any Parliament automatically dissolves five years after it first met, unless it is dissolved earlier at the request of the prime minister. Polling day must occur no more than 25 working days following dissolution.

== Opinion polling ==
All polling companies listed here are members of the British Polling Council (BPC) and abide by its disclosure and sample size rules. The dates for these opinion polls range from the 2024 general election on 4 July 2024 to the present day.

== Target seats ==
Identified potential target seats using calculation of requiring 5% swing or less from winning party at the 2024 general election for the seat to change hands. For those parties with no target seats using this calculation shows the three seats with smallest swing required for that party to win a seat. Each constituency is linked to data about that constituency that includes details about the 2024 general election result.

=== Labour ===
Rank	Constituency	Winning party 2024	Swing required
1	Dundee Central	Scottish National Party	0.87%
2	Arbroath and Broughty Ferry	Scottish National Party	0.97%
3	Moray West, Nairn and Strathspey	Scottish National Party	1.05%
4	Aberdeen North	Scottish National Party	2.09%
5	Aberdeen South	Scottish National Party	4.05%
6	Dumfriesshire, Clydesdale and Tweeddale	Conservative Party	5.49%

=== Scottish National Party ===
Rank	Constituency	Winning party 2024	Swing required
1	Gordon and Buchan	Conservative Party	1.00%
2	Dumfries and Galloway	Conservative Party	1.02%
3	Stirling and Strathallan	Labour Party	1.40%
4	Inverness, Skye and West Ross-shire	Liberal Democrats	2.25%
5	West Aberdeenshire and Kincardine	Conservative Party	3.51%
6	Livingston	Labour Party	3.93%
7	Edinburgh East and Musselburgh	Labour Party	4.08%
8	Glenrothes and Mid Fife	Labour Party	4.09%
9	North Ayrshire and Arran	Labour Party	4.20%
10	Glasgow South West	Labour Party	4.60%
11	Dumfriesshire, Clydesdale and Tweeddale	Conservative Party	4.80%
12	Glasgow South	Labour Party	4.90%
13	Cumbernauld and Kirkintilloch	Labour Party	5.06%
14	Ayr, Carrick and Cumnock	Labour Party	5.07%
15	Glasgow North	Labour Party	5.09%
16	Glasgow East	Labour Party	5.34%
17	Falkirk	Labour Party	5.86%

=== Liberal Democrats ===
Rank	Constituency	Winning party 2024	Swing required
1	Argyll, Bute and South Lochaber	Scottish National Party	9.16%
2	Gordon and Buchan	Conservative Party	14.22%
3	Aberdeenshire West and Kincardine	Conservative Party	15.62%

=== Conservative ===
Rank	Constituency	Winning party 2024	Swing required
1	Moray West, Nairn and Strathspey	Scottish National Party	1.08%
2	Aberdeenshire North and Moray East	Scottish National Party	1.23%
3	Perth and Kinross-shire	Scottish National Party	4.12%
4	Aberdeen South	Scottish National Party	4.22%
5	Angus and Perthshire Glens	Scottish National Party	5.14%

=== Greens ===
Rank	Constituency	Winning party 2024	Swing required
1	Dumfries and Galloway	Conservative Party	13.44%
2	Moray West, Nairn and Strathspey	Scottish National Party	14.25%
3	Glasgow South	Labour Party	14.35%

=== Reform UK ===
Rank	Constituency	Winning party 2024	Swing required
1	Dumfriesshire, Clydesdale and Tweeddale	Conservative Party	15.69%
2	Ayr, Carrick and Cumnock	Labour Party	17.67%
3	Aberdeen South	Scottish National Party	17.81%

== MPs not seeking re-election ==
Members of Parliament not standing for re-election
MP	Constituency	First elected	Affiliation	Date announced	Note

== See also ==
- List of political parties in Scotland
- Next Scottish Parliament election
- Next United Kingdom general election
- Opinion polling in Scotland for the next United Kingdom general election
