= Opinion polling for the next Scottish Parliament election =

In the run-up to the next Scottish Parliament election, various organisations are expected to conduct opinion polls to gauge voting intentions. Results of such polls are displayed in this list. The pollsters listed are generally members of the British Polling Council (BPC) unless noted, all abide by its disclosure rules. The date range for these opinion polls is from the previous Scottish Parliament election, held on 7 May 2026, to the next election, which is due to be held on 1 May 2031. (Note: An extraordinary election on an earlier date is possible under certain circumstances, see next Scottish Parliament election for more information. Note that such an extraordinary election would not replace the scheduled election, unless it were to be held less than six months before the due date of 1 May 2031.)

== Constituency vote ==
Polling for the next Holyrood election - constituency vote

Dates conducted	Pollster	Client	Sample size	SNP	Lab	Ref	Greens	Con	Lib Dems	Others	Lead
20–23 Oct 2026	Norstat	The Sunday Times	1,000	34%	18%	13%	7%	12%	9%	6%	16
9–14 Oct 2026	Survation	Fore Energy Ltd.	1,003	32%	19%	19%	6%	12%	10%	2%	13
9–13 Oct 2026	More in Common		1,035	36%	21%	15%	3%	12%	10%	2%	15
19 Sep 2026	Michael Marra is elected leader of Scottish Labour										
15–18 Sep 2026	Norstat	Believe in Scotland	1,001	37%	16%	13%	9%	14%	10%	1%	21
13–24 Aug 2026	Survation	Diffley Partnership	2,036	37%	19%	18%	5%	11%	10%	5%	19
11–26 Jun 2026	YouGov	Scottish Election Study	2,214	38%	18%	15%	9%	11%	10%	3%	23
7 May 2026	2026 Scottish Parliament election			38.2%	19.2%	15.8%	2.3%	11.8%	11.4%	1.6%	19

== Regional vote ==
Polling for the next Holyrood election - regional vote

Dates conducted	Pollster	Pollsters Analysis	Sample size	SNP	Lab	Ref	Greens	Con	Lib Dems	Others	Lead
20–23 Oct 2026	Norstat	The Sunday Times	1,000	28%	17%	13%	15%	13%	9%	6%	11
9–14 Oct 2026	Survation	Fore Energy Ltd	1,003	26%	19%	19%	12%	12%	9%	3%	7
9–13 Oct 2026	More in Common		1,035	30%	20%	17%	7%	13%	10%	3%	10
19 Sep 2026	Michael Marra is elected leader of Scottish Labour										
15–18 Sep 2026	Norstat	Believe in Scotland	1,001	31%	15%	14%	14%	14%	10%	1%	16
13–24 Aug 2026	Survation	Diffley Partnership	2,036	31%	18%	17%	9%	12%	11%	4%	13
11–26 Jun 2026	YouGov	Scottish Election Study	2,214	28%	16%	12%	19%	12%	9%	4%	9
7 May 2026	2026 Scottish Parliament election			27.2%	16.0%	16.6%	14.0%	11.8%	9.4%	5.0%	10.5

== MRP polls ==
Dates conducted	Pollster	Pollsters Analysis	Sample size	SNP	Lab	Ref	Greens	Con	Lib Dems
7 May 2026	2026 Scottish Parliament election			58	17	17	15	12	10

== See also ==
- List of political parties in Scotland
- Opinion polling in Scotland for the next United Kingdom general election
- Opinion polling on Scottish independence
