= Opinion polling in Scotland for the next United Kingdom general election =

Opinion polling for the next United Kingdom general election is carried out continually by various organisations to gauge voting intention. Politics and polling in Scotland often have a different dynamic to the rest of the UK, and polling companies undertake separate polling in Scotland: results of such polls are displayed in this article. The polling companies listed are all members of the British Polling Council (unless noted) all abide by its disclosure rules. The dates of these opinion polls range from the previous general election on 4 July 2024 to the present.

The next UK general election must be held no later than 15 August 2029 under the Dissolution and Calling of Parliament Act 2022. The act mandates that any Parliament automatically dissolves five years after it first met – unless it is dissolved earlier at the request of the prime minister – and polling day occurs no more than 25 working days later.

== Graphical summary ==
The chart below shows opinion polls conducted specifically in Scotland since the 2024 general election. The trend lines are locally estimated scatterplot smoothing (LOESS) for all polls included in the table below. (Note: As the graph must be manually updated for each new poll, some newer polls may not appear. The dates on which the graph has been updated can be viewed at the file page on Wikimedia Commons.) The bar on the left represents the previous election, and the bar on the right represents the latest possible date of the next election.

A graph showing the results of opinion polling in Scotland for the next United Kingdom general election

== Polls ==
Date(s) conducted	Pollster	Client	Sample size	Lab	SNP	Con	LD	Ref	Grn	Others	Lead
20–23 Oct 2026	Norstat	The Sunday Times	1,000	21%	32%	13%	6%	15%	7%	5%	11
9–14 Oct 2026	Survation	Fore Energy Ltd.	1,003	20%	30%	12%	9%	20%	7%	2%	10
9–13 Oct 2026	More in Common		1,035	24%	30%	13%	8%	16%	3%	6%	6
18 Sep – 12 Oct 2026	Survation	The SNP	2,039	20%	34%	12%	8%	18%	6%	3%	14
8–10 Oct 2026	Public First (Note: Figures manually adjusted to remove 'Refused' & 'Would not Vote' categories.)	Adura	406	23%	32%	9%	6%	20%	8%	2%	9
25 Sep – 2 Oct 2026	Find Out Now	PLMR	557	15%	31%	11%	11%	13%	11%	7%	16
15–18 Sep 2026	Norstat	Belive in Scotland	1,001	18%	32%	13%	9%	15%	8%	6%	14
13–24 Aug 2026	Survation	Diffley Partnership	2,036	19%	34%	11%	8%	18%	5%	4%	16
4–10 Aug 2026	Find Out Now	The National	1,020	18%	29%	10%	10%	17%	10%	6%	11
17–20 Jul 2026	Andy Burnham is elected as leader of the Labour Party and subsequently becomes Prime Minister										
11–26 Jun 2026	YouGov	Scottish Elections Study	2,214	16%	34%	11%	8%	17%	10%	4%	17
27–29 May 2026	Norstat	The Times	1,002	16%	34%	10%	9%	17%	10%	4%	17
7 May 2026	2026 Scottish Parliament election										
27–30 Apr 2026	Norstat	The Sunday Times	1,002	19%	29%	14%	10%	18%	8%	2%	10
14–21 Apr 2026	Survation	Ballot Box Scotland	1,008	19%	31%	10%	8%	21%	7%	2%	10
30 Mar – 1 Apr 2026	Norstat	The Sunday Times	1,006	18%	32%	11%	10%	16%	9%	4%	14
26–31 Mar 2026	Ipsos	STV	1,030	15%	37%	11%	8%	18%	9%	2%	19
26 Mar 2026	The Alba Party deregisters as a political party and dissolves										
20 Feb – 6 Mar 2026	Lord Ashcroft Poll (Note: Pollster is not a member of the British Polling Council.)		2,089	13%	36%	10%	8%	16%	12%	5%	20
19–25 Feb 2026	Ipsos	STV	1,083	19%	33%	10%	10%	18%	8%	2%	14
13–19 Feb 2026	Find Out Now	The National	1,002	14%	31%	8%	10%	23%	10%	3%	8
11–18 Feb 2026	YouGov	Scottish Elections Study	1,477	14%	32%	11%	9%	21%	11%	2%	11
10–13 Feb 2026	Norstat	The Sunday Times	1,001	17%	32%	11%	7%	23%	8%	1%	9
13–16 Jan 2026	Norstat	The Sunday Times	1,016	17%	32%	11%	9%	21%	7%	1%	11
15 Jan 2026	Malcolm Offord is appointed leader of Reform UK in Scotland										
8–12 Jan 2026	Survation	True North	1,003	17%	31%	12%	9%	21%	8%	0%	10
11–19 Dec 2025	Find Out Now	The National	1,000	13%	32%	10%	8%	24%	10%	3%	8
27 Nov – 3 Dec 2025	Ipsos	STV	1061	17%	33%	11%	8%	20%	11%	1%	13
22–25 Sep 2025	Norstat	The Sunday Times	1,010	18%	31%	11%	9%	23%	7%	1%	8
15–21 Sep 2025	Find Out Now	The National	1,282	15%	30%	10%	9%	23%	6%	5%	7
4–16 Sep 2025	Survation	Scotland in Union	2,051	19%	35%	12%	8%	19%	4%	1%	16
21 Aug – 1 Sep 2025	More in Common		1,104	17%	31%	11%	11%	21%	6%	2%	10
29 Aug 2025	Gillian Mackay and Ross Greer are elected co-leaders of the Scottish Greens										
13–19 Jun 2025	YouGov	Scottish Election Study	1,178	19%	29%	10%	11%	22%	7%	1%	7
12–18 Jun 2025	Ipsos	STV	1,066	22%	31%	10%	9%	16%	10%	1%	9
27–30 May 2025	Norstat	The Sunday Times	1,007	20%	31%	12%	8%	21%	7%	1%	10
2–5 May 2025	Survation	True North	1,020	19%	32%	11%	11%	21%	5%		11
16–22 Apr 2025	Survation	Diffley Partnership	1,005	24%	33%	14%	9%	15%	5%		9
25 Feb – 3 Mar 2025	YouGov	Scottish Election Study	1,164	21%	32%	12%	7%	19%	7%	1%	11
15–20 Jan 2025	Find Out Now	Sunday Herald	1,334	18%	32%	12%	9%	17%	6%	5%	14
11–14 Jan 2025	Norstat	The Sunday Times	1,334	18%	32%	13%	11%	17%	6%		14
7–13 Jan 2025	Survation	Holyrood Sources	1,024	24%	33%	14%	9%	15%	4%	1%	9
17–24 Dec 2024	Find Out Now	The National	1,774	20%	34%	13%	9%	15%	6%	2%	14
4–6 Dec 2024	Norstat	The Sunday Times	1,013	20%	31%	14%	9%	15%	6%	1%	11
1–15 Nov 2024	Survation	Progress Scotland	3,016	28%	31%	15%	6%	13%	5%	1%	3
30 Oct – 1 Nov 2024	Norstat	The Sunday Times	1,013	23%	30%	15%	10%	14%	6%	1%	7
27 Sep 2024	Russell Findlay is elected leader of the Scottish Conservatives										
10–13 Sep 2024	Survation	Progress Scotland	2,059	31%	31%	14%	9%	11%	3%		Tie
5–11 Sep 2024	Opinium	The Sunday Times	1,028	25%	32%	14%	8%	11%	7%	2%	7
20–22 Aug 2024	Norstat	The Sunday Times	1,011	32%	29%	12%	8%	12%	5%	1%	3
4 Jul 2024	2024 General Election Result		–	35.3%	30.0%	12.7%	9.7%	7.0%	3.8%	1.6%	5.3

== UK polls with Scottish sub-samples ==
This section captures data from UK-wide polls that have a Scottish sub-sample. The size of such sub-samples is typically small, and results should be viewed with caution as the statistical margin of error will typically be in the region of ±10%. The statistical margin of error for a full poll with a sample size of 1000 is typically ±3%. Additional uncertainty arises from the fact that sub-samples may not be correctly weighted to account for demographic variations (age, gender, previous voting intention etc.).

Where the results of sub-samples consistently report a similar set of results then the statistical significance increases, even with a high margin of error. In contrast, where statistical noise overwhelms the results there would not be an identifiable pattern between polling sub-samples. Therefore, results of polling sub-samples may provide a regular insight into Scottish political opinion when results align or when results are chained together, as demonstrated between 2020 and 2024. As such, they provide an opportunity to measure movements in Scottish political opinion during periods when full 'Scottish only' polling is relatively rare.

=== 2026 ===
Date(s) conducted	Pollster	Client	Sample size	Lab	SNP	Con	LD	Ref	Grn	RB	Others	Lead
18–20 Nov 2026	Opinium	The Observer	145	25%	32%	11%	6%	13%	10%		3%	7
18–19 Nov 2026	Find out Now		148	14%	33%	12%	8%	13%	11%		9%	19
15–16 Nov 2026	YouGov	The Times/Sky News	196	23%	35%	12%	6%	13%	6%	4%	2%	12
13–16 Nov 2026	Deltapoll		247	23%	30%	10%	8%	21%	4%		4%	7
13–15 Nov 2026	More in Common		130	20%	29%	13%	12%	9%	5%	12%		9
11–12 Nov 2026	Find out Now		131	14%	32%	14%	11%	12%	8%		8%	18
11–12 Nov 2026	Survation		143	20%	34%	18%	6%	15%	6%	1%		14
3–12 Nov 2026	Trajectory Partnership		109	18%	34%	13%	4%	14%	10%	8%		16
8–9 Nov 2026	YouGov	The Times/Sky News	212	21%	33%	11%	3%	18%	8%	3%	2	12
6–9 Nov 2026	More in Common		114	21%	30%	15%	8%	11%	2%	13%		9
6–9 Nov 2026	Deltapoll		236	20%	36%	14%	5%	15%	8%		3%	16
4–6 Nov 2026	Opinium	The Observer	137	24%	32%	12%	2%	15%	12%		3%	8
4 Nov 2026	Find out Now		117	15%	27%	13%	15%	16%	7%		7%	11
1–2 Nov 2026	YouGov	The Times/Sky News	205	15%	32%	16%	13%	11%	7%	5%		16
30 Oct – 2 Nov 2026	Deltapoll		295	17%	36%	14%	4%	19%	5%		5%	17
29 Oct – 2 Nov 2026	Lord Ashcroft (Note: Lord Ashcroft is not a member of the British Polling Council)		457	22%	32%	14%	7%	12%	8%		5%	10
28–30 Oct 2026	Opinium	The Observer	133	24%	33%	13%	4%	15%	7%		4%	9
28–29 Oct 2026	BMG Research	iPaper	124	24%	24%	15%	2%	14%	6%	13%	2%	Tie
28–29 Oct 2026	Find out Now		134	22%	31%	11%	9%	15%	7%		11%	9
25–26 Oct 2026	YouGov	The Times/Sky News	198	21%	28%	11%	10%	16%	11%	4%		7
23–26 Oct 2026	More in Common		248	20%	27%	11%	7%	15%	13%	6%		7
21–23 Oct 2026	Opinium	The Observer	132	23%	32%	10%	3%	15%	11%		6%	9
21–22 Oct 2026	Find out Now		103	20%	37%	10%	3%	14%	6%		11%	17
15–22 Oct 2026	IPSOS		63	26%	40%	17%	1%	18%	6%			14
18–19 Oct 2026	YouGov	The Times/Sky News	219	23%	26%	10%	8%	19%	11%	2%		3
16–19 Oct 2026	Deltapoll		226	23%	41%	11%	4%	13%	6%		1%	18
16–19 Oct 2026	More in Common		162	23%	27%	15%	6%	11%	8%	9%		4
14 Oct 2026	Find out Now		117	11%	34%	16%	5%	18%	11%		5%	16
5–14 Oct 2026	Trajectory Partnership		108	20%	26%	12%	7%	18%	9%	5%		6
11–12 Oct 2026	YouGov	The Times/Sky News	208	16%	38%	9%	8%	18%	9%	2%		20
9–12 Oct 2026	More in Common		94	21%	22%	15%	16%	14%	8%	3%	1%	1
9–11 Oct 2026	Freshwater Strategy	City AM	70	16%	24%	12%	12%	12%	15%		10%	8
7–9 Oct 2026	Opinium	The Observer	137	26%	26%	9%	4%	26%	4%		5%	Tie
7 Oct 2026	Find out Now		125	19%	29%	14%	6%	14%	7%		11%	10
4–5 Oct 2026	YouGov	The Times/Sky News	201	22%	28%	11%	11%	15%	8%	3%	1%	6
3–5 Oct 2026	More in Common		123	20%	24%	12%	9%	20%	10%	5%	2%	4
2–5 Oct 2026	Survation		145	21%	29%	14%	7%	19%	5%	4%	1%	8
30 Sep – 2 Oct 2026	Opinium	The Observer	126	25%	26%	12%	2%	18%	11%		5%	1
30 Sep 2026	Find out Now		136	18%	32%	7%	8%	21%	6%		8%	11
29 Sep 2026	Survation		126	29%	29%	13%	6%	12%	5%	3%	3%	Tie
25–29 Sep 2026	More in Common		113	27%	31%	11	14%	7%	7%	4%		4
27–28 Sep 2026	YouGov	The Times/Sky News	201	17%	26%	13%	14%	19%	9%		3%	9
23–25 Sep 2026	Opinium	The Observer	129	26%	34%	7%	6%	15%	2%		10%	8
23–24 Sep 2026	BMG Research	iPaper	128	16%	33%	13%	9%	9%	6%	11%	3%	17
23 Sep 2026	Find out Now		126	16%	27%	11%	11%	14%	11%		11%	11
20–21 Sep 2026	YouGov	The Times/Sky News	199	15%	28%	12%	11%	15%	13%	4%	2%	13
16–18 Sep 2026	Opinium	The Observer	140	20%	34%	9%	7%	16%	9%		5%	14
16 Sep 2026	Find out Now		133	16%	31%	10%	11%	18%	9%		5%	13
7–16 Sep 2026	Trajectory Partnership		128	22%	27%	10%	7%	18%	7%	3%	5%	5
11–15 Sep 2026	More in Common		221	20%	26%	9%	12%	18%	6%	9%		6
13–14 Sep 2026	YouGov	The Times/Sky News	187	18%	35%	9%	7%	19%	8%	3%	1%	16
11–14 Sep 2026	Deltapoll		253	18%	38%	12%	6%	12%	9%		5%	20
9–11 Sep 2026	Opinium	The Observer	132	21%	31%	11%	4%	15%	11%		7%	10
9–10 Sep 2026	Survation		145	20%	29%	18%	7%	21%	3%	1%	1%	8
9 Sep 2026	Find out Now		129	14%	31%	9%	13%	20%	6%		6%	11
6–7 Sep 2026	YouGov	The Times/Sky News	206	18%	35%	14%	10%	14%	6%	1%	1%	17
4–6 Sep 2026	Freshwater Strategy	City AM	64	23%	29%	10%	7%	16%	13%		3%	6
4–6 Sep 2026	More in Common		102	16%	22%	7%	18%	14%	11%	9%	1%	4
2–4 Sep 2026	Opinium	The Observer	139	28%	32%	8%	10%	14%	6%		2%	4
2 Sep 2026	Find out Now		106	15%	29%	16%	11%	17%	8%		4%	12
31 Aug – 1 Sep 2026	YouGov	The Times/Sky News	195	17%	33%	11%	8%	14%	14%		4%	16
28–31 Aug 2026	More in Common		195	21%	34%	14%	12%	10%	5%		4%	13
27 Aug – 1 Sep 2026	Lord Ashcroft		440	20%	30%	14%	6%	11%	14%		6%	10
26–28 Aug 2026	Opinium	The Observer	131	25%	33%	10%	10%	14%	6%		2%	8
26–28 Aug 2026	Survation		142	23%	28%	12%	10%	16%	7%		2%	5
26 Aug 2026	Find out Now		105	16%	35%	8%	14%	17%	5%		5%	18
25–26 Aug 2026	BMG Research	iPaper	139	19%	33%	11%	13%	12%	9%		4%	14
23–24 Aug 2026	YouGov	The Times/Sky News	207	20%	29%	7%	6%	21%	11%		6%	8
21–24 Aug 2026	Deltapoll		234	28%	33%	10%	5%	16%	3%		4%	5
21–23 Aug 2026	More in Common		163	23%	22%	12%	15%	18%	6%		3%	1
19 Aug 2026	Find out Now		108	13%	36%	14%	7%	14%	9%		8%	22
18 Aug 2026	Survation		158	21%	33%	12%	9%	15%	5%		4%	12
16–17 Aug 2026	YouGov	The Times/Sky News	212	18%	35%	7%	13%	19%	6%		2%	16
14–17 Aug 2026	Deltapoll		222	19%	30%	8%	19%	28%	7%		2%	2
14–17 Aug 2026	More in Common		120	22%	25%	7%	20%	14%	5%		1%	3
12–14 Aug 2026	Opinium	The Observer	139	24%	30%	8%	4%	13%	12%		9%	6
10–13 Aug 2026	Survation		158	21%	33%	12%	9%	15%	5%		4%	12
12 Aug 2026	Find out Now		118	17%	36%	15%	4%	19%	8%		2%	17
5–12 Aug 2026	Trajectory Partnership		107	20%	37%	9%	7%	11%	10%		6%	17
9–10 Aug 2026	YouGov	The Times/Sky News	210	18%	28%	13%	6%	18%	14%		3%	10
7–10 Aug 2026	More in Common		99	23%	31%	11%	16%	13%	4%		2%	8
7–10 Aug 2026	Freshwater Strategy	City AM	74	22%	32%	3%	10%	20%	5%		7%	10
5–7 Aug 2026	Opinium	The Observer	120	22%	31%	14%	7%	17%	6%		2%	9
5 Aug 2026	Find out Now		120	19%	32%	9%	14%	16%	7%		3%	13
30 Jul – 4 Aug 2026	IPSOS		65	16%	35%	12%	12%	6%	15%		8%	19
2–3 Aug 2026	YouGov	The Times/Sky News	200	17%	35%	12%	11%	16%	7%		3%	18
1–3 Aug 2026	JL Partners		176	19%	26%	16%	7%	21%	4%		6%	5
30 Jul – 3 Aug 2026	Lord Ashcroft		461	19%	31%	14%	10%	18%	8%		6%	12
31 Jul – 2 Aug 2026	More in Common		193	21%	29%	14%	13%	15%	6%		1%	8
29–31 Jul 2026	Opinium	The Observer	134	21%	35%	8%	6%	15%	11%		5%	14
28–30 Jul 2026	BMG Research		85	19%	34%	12%	19%	5%	9%		2%	15
29 Jul 2026	Find out Now		107	15%	31%	13%	12%	19%	7%		2%	12
26–27 Jul 2026	YouGov	The Times/Sky News	203	21%	28%	10%	11%	15%	11%		5%	7
25–27 Jul 2026	Survation		68	19%	30%	21%	10%	15%	4%		0%	9
24–27 Jul 2026	More in Common		109	36%	20%	20%	14%	10%	1%			16
24–27 Jul 2026	Deltapoll		315	18%	38%	13%	6%	14%	9%		3%	20
22–24 Jul 2026	Survation		65	19%	37%	7%	10%	20%	6%		2%	18
22–23 Jul 2026	YouGov	The Times/Sky News	197	12%	37%	12%	12%	16%	4%		7%	21
22 Jul 2026	Find out Now		111	10%	38%	16%	6%	16%	7%		7%	22
21–22 Jul 2026	More in Common		135	17%	27%	15%	15%	18%	8%		1%	9
19–20 Jul 2026	YouGov	The Times/Sky News	202	17%	33%	19%	8%	13%	8%		3%	14
17–20 Jul 2026	Deltapoll		164	17%	36%	11%	5%	20%	7%		4%	16
15–17 Jul 2026	Opinium	The Observer	133	13%	32%	7%	7%	18%	15%		7%	14
6–16 Jul 2026	Trajectory Partnership		110	18%	35%	10%	8%	8%	10%		8%	17
15 Jul 2026	Find out Now		123	9%	37%	13%	12%	18%	7%		5%	19
10–14 Jul 2026	Survation		172	17%	30%	12%	12%	17%	4%		8%	13
12–13 Jul 2026	YouGov	The Times/Sky News	203	17%	30%	10%	10%	19%	11%		4%	11
10–13 Jul 2026	More in Common		118	16%	23%	21%	13%	21%	6%		1%	2
7–10 Jul 2026	Opinium	The Observer	141	18%	32%	12%	5%	16%	9%		9%	14
8–9 Jul 2026	Find out Now		102	17%	36%	14%	12%	10%	10%		4%	19
5–6 Jul 2026	YouGov	The Times/Sky News	199	13%	33%	9%	13	15%	9%		7%	18
3–6 Jul 2026	More in Common		103	20%	26%	12%	18%	15%	9%		0%	6
3–5 Jul 2026	Freshwater Strategy	City AM	68	9%	30%	11%	5%	26%	11%		2%	4
1–3 Jul 2026	Opinium	The Observer	136	15%	33%	9%	6%	19%	11%		7%	14
1–2 Jul 2026	Find out Now		95	15%	28%	7%	15%	18%	9%		8%	10
25–30 Jun 2026	IPSOS		68	9%	29%	11%	13%	25%	13%		3%	4
28–29 Jun 2026	YouGov	The Times/Sky News	212	12%	36%	11%	8%	16%	11%		2%	20
26–29 Jun 2026	More in Common		126	26%	24%	16%	11%	15%	3%		4%	2
25–29 Jun 2026	Lord Ashcroft		441	15%	34%	12%	7%	16%	10%		6%	18
24–26 Jun 2026	Opinium	The Observer	143	13%	32%	10%	8%	18%	10%		7%	14
24–25 Jun 2026	Find out Now		93	15%	35%	12%	5%	13%	13%		7%	20
23–30 Jun 2026	Find out Now		326	14%	31%	13%	11%	13%	9%		10%	17
23–24 Jun 2026	BMG Research		120	17%	34%	21%	9%	15%	4%		0%	13
21–22 Jun 2026	YouGov	The Times/Sky News	204	13%	31%	15%	15%	14%	6%		6%	16
19–22 Jun 2026	More in Common		153	18%	30%	15%	14%	17%	3%		3%	12
17–19 Jun 2026	Opinium	The Observer	141	14%	31%	10%	6%	22%	9%		7%	9
17–18 Jun 2026	Find out Now		99	10%	38%	13%	11%	17%	9%		1%	21
14–15 Jun 2026	YouGov		201	17%	24%	10%	13%	18%	13%		5%	6
12–15 Jun 2026	More in Common		110	21%	20%	8%	11%	31%	8%		0%	10
12–15 Jun 2026	Deltapoll		168	17%	31%	6%	5%	28%	8%		4%	3
11–15 Jun 2026	Survation		72	15%	31%	12%	10%	15%	16%		0%	15
10–11 Jun 2026	Find out Now		96	15%	29%	9%	14%	21%	7%		5%	8
5–9 Jun 2026	More in Common		113	16%	30%	15%	11%	19%	5%		4%	11
7–8 Jun 2026	YouGov		197	13%	33%	17%	9%	15%	10%		3%	16
31 May – 7 Jun 2026	Good Growth Foundation		348	15%	39%	9%	8%	17%	9%		1%	22
3–5 Jun 2026	Opinium	The Observer	141	15%	34%	11%	4%	19%	13%		3%	15
3–4 Jun 2026	Find out Now		139	12%	34%	10%	7%	18%	9%		10%	16
31 May – 1 Jun 2026	YouGov		204	13%	29%	13%	11%	19%	11%		2%	10
29 May – 1 Jun 2026	More in Common		109	19%	25%	17%	12%	20%	6%		1%	5
26–28 May 2026	BMG Research		105	12%	24%	16%	13%	21%	10%		4%	3
27 May 2026	Find out Now		109	11%	38%	11%	6%	19%	12%		2%	19
25–26 May 2026	YouGov		205	12%	34%	8%	4%	21%	11%		4%	13
21–26 May 2026	Lord Ashcroft		458	12%	33%	15%	11%	14%	11%		3%	18
21–25 May 2026	More in Common		119	20%	25%	9%	10%	24%	11%		1%	1
20–22 May 2026	Opinium	The Observer	144	12%	36%	11%	7%	18%	14%		4%	18
20–21 May 2026	Find out Now		141	21%	35%	10%	10%	14%	7%		2%	14
14–21 May 2026	JL Partners		145	24%	33%	13%	10%	11%	8%		3%	9
15–20 May 2026	IPSOS		74	15%	35%	9%	4%	12%	11%		4%	20
15–19 May 2026	More in Common		121	14%	34%	12%	17%	17%	4%		2%	17
17–18 May 2026	YouGov		205	12%	32%	15%	11%	18%	10%		3%	14
13 May 2026	Find out Now		148	5%	40%	12%	13%	13%	9%		6%	27
9–12 May 2026	More in Common		167	18%	27%	12%	16%	21%	5%		1%	6
10–11 May 2026	YouGov		203	10%	39%	10%	9%	17%	13%		3%	22
9–10 May 2026	Freshwater Strategy	City AM	61	13%	32%	13%	6%	33%	10%		1%	1
6–8 May 2026	Opinium	The Observer	141	15%	37%	12%	4%	21%	6%		4%	16
7 May 2026	2026 Scottish Parliament election											
6 May 2026	Find out Now		91	15%	35%	13%	12%	13%	10%		1%	20
4–5 May 2026	YouGov		207	17%	33%	7%	12%	18%	7%		6%	15
1–4 May 2026	More in Common		103	14%	23%	13%	14%	23%	5%		7%	Tie
26–27 Apr 2026	YouGov		205	17%	27%	13%	7%	17%	13%		6%	10
29 Apr 2026	Find out Now		126	16%	37%	11%	9%	19%	5%		3%	18
22–24 Apr 2026	Opinium	The Observer	130	18%	29%	9%	4%	20%	15%		5%	9
22–23 Apr 2026	Find out Now		138	13%	36%	14%	8%	14%	11%		4%	22
19–20 Apr 2026	YouGov	The Times/Sky News	215	12%	33%	11%	11%	26%	11%		1	7
17–20 Apr 2026	More in Common		105	18%	31%	9%	13%	15%	9%		6%	13
15–17 Apr 2026	Opinium	The Observer	133	19%	27%	12%	8%	18%	11%		5%	8
15–16 Apr 2026	Find Out Now		97	16%	30%	14%	9%	19%	11%		2%	11
15 Apr 2026	Find Out Now		113	9%	29%	13%	12%	15%	12%		2%	14
9–15 Apr 2026	IPSOS		69	13%	24%	6%	16%	25%	16%		5%	1
12–13 Apr 2026	YouGov	The Times/Sky News	206	9%	33%	9%	8%	29%	8%		4%	4
10–13 Apr 2026	More in Common		89	15%	30%	10%	15%	23%	5%		4%	7
10–12 Apr 2026	Freshwater Strategy	City AM	59	17%	24%	14%	13%	15%	9%		7%	7
8–9 Apr 2026	JL Partners		293	19%	30%	11%	10%	18%	8%		3%	11
8 Apr 2026	Find Out Now		150	12%	33%	13%	11%	18%	8%		4%	15
6–7 Apr 2026	YouGov	The Times/Sky News	202	14%	33%	11%	9%	15%	11%		4%	18
2–7 Apr 2026	More in Common		99	25%	27%	7%	14%	22%	4%		1%	2
1–2 Apr 2026	Find Out Now		107	10%	30%	12%	12%	18%	12%		5%	12
27 Mar – 1 Apr 2026	Good Growth Foundation		176	15%	33%	7%	13%	19%	8%		5%	14
29–30 Mar 2026	YouGov	The Times/Sky News	206	17%	37%	12%	7%	16%	7%		3%	20
28–30 Mar 2026	More in Common		97	21%	23%	11%	15%	22%	9%		4%	1
26–27 Mar 2026	Find Out Now		161	14%	34%	11%	11%	20%	9%		2%	14
25 Mar 2026	BMG Now		131	10%	32%	12%	13%	15%	12%		7%	17
22–23 Mar 2026	YouGov	The Times/Sky News	212	16%	42%	5%	14%	15%	8%		1%	26
20–23 Mar 2026	More in Common		121	13%	31%	12%	17%	20%	3%		2%	11
18–20 Mar 2026	Opinium	The Observer	139	18%	28%	11%	12%	18%	10%		2%	14
18 Mar 2026	Find Out Now		124	12%	33%	7%	12%	17%	13%		7%	16
15–16 Mar 2026	YouGov	The Times/Sky News	203	15%	27%	11%	13%	22%	8%		4%	5
13–16 Mar 2026	More in Common		120	22%	25%	14%	14%	21%	5%		0%	3
11 Mar 2026	Find Out Now		131	11%	28%	8%	13%	24%	13%		4%	4
9–10 Mar 2026	YouGov	The Times/Sky News	195	19%	27%	13%	9%	16%	13%		3%	8
6–10 Mar 2026	Focal Data		76	18%	28%	8%	9%	11%	7%		17%	10
6–9 Mar 2026	More in Common		139	19%	20%	15%	12%	28%	4%		%	8
4–6 Mar 2026	Opinium	The Observer	135	16%	30%	11%	8%	18%	11%		6%	12
4–6 Mar 2026	Find Out Now		117	9%	27%	9%	14%	23%	14%		5%	4
5 Mar 2026	Survation		74	15%	25%	8%	13%	30%	11%		0%	5
3–4 Mar 2026	BMG Research	iPaper	107	13%	27%	14%	10%	17%	14%		5%	10
1–2 Mar 2026	YouGov	The Times/Sky News	180	12%	38%	9%	12%	16%	10%		5%	22
27 Feb – 2 Mar 2026	More in Common		120	14%	33%	9%	14%	18%	9%		3%	15
25 Feb 2026	Find Out Now		129	7%	33%	7%	13%	17%	17%		6%	16
22–23 Feb 2026	YouGov	The Times/Sky News	202	13%	36%	10%	12%	21%	4%		4%	15
20–23 Feb 2026	More in Common		118	19%	28%	9%	14%	23%	6%		1%	5
18 Feb 2026	Find Out Now		107	15%	36%	6%	8%	19%	11%		5%	17
13–17 Feb 2026	More in Common		114	16%	33%	10%	11%	19%	7%		4%	14
15–16 Feb 2026	YouGov	The Times/Sky News	207	11%	38%	11%	9%	18%	5%		7%	20
13–16 Feb 2026	GGF Insights		125	22%	36%	10%	11%	14%	6%		0%	14
4–12 Feb 2026	JL Partners		167	20%	31%	10%	9%	20%	9%		2%	11
11 Feb 2026	Find Out Now		124	9%	33%	11%	11%	23%	11%		3%	10
6–10 Feb 2026	More in Common		101	26%	26%	15%	5%	23%	3%		3%	Tie
8–9 Feb 2026	YouGov	The Times/Sky News	212	21%	33%	5%	8%	22%	11%		2%	11
4 Feb 2026	Find Out Now		118	16%	23%	14%	7%	24%	13%		2%	1
1–2 Feb 2026	YouGov	The Times/Sky News	203	13%	35%	9%	11%	23%	7%		2%	12
31 Jan – 2 Feb 2026	More in Common		128	22%	29%	9%	9%	27%	4%		0%	2
30 Jan – 1 Feb 2026	Freshwater Strategy	City AM	55	9%	29%	9%	12%	27%	12%		3%	2
28–29 Jan 2026	BMG Research	iPaper	107	16%	34%	3%	16%	22%	7%		1%	12
28–29 Jan 2026	Survation		78	18%	35%	7%	14%	17%	8%		0%	18
28 Jan 2026	Find Out Now		154	11%	35%	7%	9%	22%	13%		3%	13
25–26 Jan 2026	YouGov		211	13%	35%	8%	13%	16%	15%		1%	19
23–25 Jan 2026	More in Common		111	14%	34%	10%	11%	25%	5%		0%	9
21–23 Jan 2026	Opinium	The Observer	123	20%	31%	8%	6%	25%	7%		3%	6
21 Jan 2026	Find Out Now		122	8%	37%	15%	7%	23%	8%		3%	14
18–19 Jan 2026	YouGov		203	18%	33%	9%	13%	15%	11%		2%	15
16–19 Jan 2026	FocalData		112	29%	32%	3%	9%	24%	4%		0%	3
16–19 Jan 2026	More in Common		131	19%	20%	12%	16%	32%	1%		0%	12
15–19 Jan 2026	Lord Ashcroft		474	16%	29%	11%	10%	18%	13%		3%	11
14 Jan 2026	Find Out Now		142	15%	28%	11%	11%	21%	11%		4%	7
10–14 Jan 2026	Survation		140	23%	29%	10%	9%	25%	3%		0%	4
10–13 Jan 2026	More in Common		171	16%	24%	17%	8%	27%	4%		0%	3
11–12 Jan 2026	YouGov		204	14%	40%	9%	13%	17%	4%		3%	23
9–11 Jan 2026	Freshwater Strategy	City AM	47	21%	31%	9%	16%	27%	4%		1%	5
7–9 Jan 202	Opinium	The Observer	125	16%	27%	10%	6%	31%	10%		1%	4
7–8 Jan 2026	Find Out Now		118	8%	31%	11%	11%	21%	15%		2%	10
4–5 Jan 2026	YouGov		204	11%	40%	10%	11%	18%	8%		3%	22
2–5 Jan 2026	More in Common		120	22%	22%	13%	12%	26%	4%		1%	4

=== 2025 ===
Date(s) conducted	Pollster	Client	Sample size	Lab	SNP	Con	LD	Ref	Grn	Others	Lead
31 Dec 2025	Find Out Now		150	15%	31%	9%	11	16%	11%	6%	15
24 Dec 2025	Find Out Now		136	7%	34%	13%	9%	22%	13%	2%	12
19–23 Dec 2025	More in Common		115	17%	31%	12%	14%	19%	5%	2%	12
21–22 Dec 2025	YouGov		197	12%	37%	13%	9%	19%	8%	3%	18
17 Dec 2025	Find Out Now		91	10%	29%	11%	9%	22%	14%	1%	7
12–16 Dec 2025	More in Common		125	16%	30%	15%	12%	20%	6%	1%	10
14–15 Dec 2025	YouGov		202	10%	40%	8%	5%	29%	7%	0%	11
10–12 Dec 2025	Opinium	The Observer	126	13%	32%	8%	13%	32%	9%	3%	1
10 Dec 2025	Find Out Now		113	6%	29%	13%	12%	22%	12%	7%	7
7–8 Dec 2025	YouGov		200	16%	39%	13%	9%	18%	4%	2%	21
3 Dec 2025	Find Out Now		135	13%	30%	9%	9%	23%	12%	3%	7
30 Nov – 1 Dec 2025	You Gov		206	16%	39%	9%	12%	14%	8%	2%	23
28 Nov – 1 Dec 2025	More in Common		132	19%	24%	12%	16%	20%	9%	0%	4
28–30 Nov 2025	Freshwater Strategy	City AM	79	21%	31%	10%	11%	25%	2%	1%	6
26–28 Nov 2025	FocalData		77	17%	32%	7%	14%	19%	10%	1%	14
26 Nov 2025	Opinium	The Observer	126	18%	32%	11%	7%	22%	9%	1%	10
26 Nov 2025	Find Out Now		134	13%	29%	8%	15%	22%	11%	2%	7
23–24 Nov 2025	YouGov	The Times/Sky News	209	15%	34%	10%	15%	18%	6%	3%	16
22–24 Nov 2025	More in Common		94	9%	34%	12%	12%	27%	3%	2%	7
19–21 Nov 2025	Opinium	The Observer	122	13%	31%	12%	8%	23%	11%	3%	8
18–21 Nov 2025	Focal Data		122	16%	30%	13%	10%	24%	5%	3%	6
19 Nov 2025	Find Out Now		120	18%	30%	4%	17%	17%	12%	3%	12
16–17 Nov 2025	YouGov	Times/Sky News	205	16%	32%	9%	12%	20%	9%	1%	12
14–17 Nov 2025	More in Common		135	14%	27%	9%	9%	38%	2%	0%	11
12 Nov 2025	Find Out Now		120	16%	28%	6%	8%	20%	15%	5%	8
9–10 Nov 2025	YouGov	The Times/Sky News	206	17%	33%	11%	18%	21%	5%	1%	12
7–10 Nov 2025	More In Common		129	22%	22%	11%	18%	20%	6%	1%	Tie
7–9 Nov 2025	Freshwater Strategy	City AM	64	11%	31%	11%	11%	25%	10%	1%	6
5–7 Nov 2025	Opinium		121	14%	32%	11%	4%	27%	10%	1%	5
5–6 Nov 2025	Find Out Now		154	15%	28%	9%	11%	27%	7%	2%	1
5 Nov 2025	IPSOS		70	7%	43%	4%	10%	23%	11%	10%	20
2–3 Nov 2025	YouGov		207	18%	35%	4%	10%	19%	10%	2%	16
15 Oct 2025	Find Out Now		139	14%	30%	8%	14%	27%	4%	2%	3
13–14 Oct 2025	YouGov		202	19%	35%	10%	12%	17%	6%	1%	16
7–8 Sep 2025	YouGov		206	20%	33%	10%	12%	16%	6%	3%	13
3–5 Sep 2025	Opinium	The Observer	133	24%	25%	7%	8%	22%	12%	1%	1
3 Sep 2025	Find Out Now		113	13%	31%	10%	11%	19%	12%	3%	12
28 Aug – 2 Sep 2025	Survation		154	17%	39%	14%	4%	23%	2%	1%	14
31 Aug – 1 Sep 2025	YouGov	The Times/Sky News	220	16%	36%	6%	9%	26%	4%	2%	10
29–31 Aug 2025	Freshwater Strategies	City AM	76	21%	38%	9%	10%	17%	3%	2%	17
22–28 Aug 2025	BMG Research	iPaper	76	16%	26%	20%	14%	19%	5%	1%	7
27 Aug 2025	Find Out Now		120	15%	28%	13%	15%	19%	1%	10%	9
25–26 Aug 2025	YouGov	The Times/Sky News	212	17%	32%	9%	11%	19%	8%	3%	13
20–22 Aug 2025	Opinium	The Observer	139	16%	30%	9%	16%	21%	7%	1%	9
20 Aug 2025	Find Out Now		121	14%	28%	10%	11%	18%	4%	3%	10
17–18 Aug 2025	YouGov	The Times/Sky News	208	16%	38%	10%	10%	19%	3%	3%	19
13–14 Aug 2025	Find Out Now		120	11%	30%	13%	13%	20%	6%	6%	10
10–11 Aug 2025	YouGov	The Times/Sky News	218	11%	37%	11%	13%	19%	4%	5%	18
8–11 Aug 2025	More in Common		127	25%	24%	13%	9%	18%	5%	5%	1
8–11 Aug 2025	Opinium	The Observer	124	14%	39%	10%	9%	24%	4%	1%	15
6 Aug 2025	Find Out Now		124	13%	28%	16%	12%	22%	6%	5%	6
3–4 Aug 2025	YouGov	The Times/Sky News	215	15%	39%	11%	13%	14%	5%	3%	24
1–3 Aug 2025	More in Common		125	15%	29%	17%	8%	24%	7%		5
1–3 Aug 2025	Freshwater Strategies	City AM	57	14%	40%	20%	5%	18%	4%	0%	20
29–31 Jul 2025	BMG Research	iPaper	123	15%	29%	17%	12%	18%	8%	5%	11
30 Jul 2025	Find Out Now		130	17%	26%	11%	10%	21%	5%	5%	5
27–28 Jul 2025	YouGov	The Times/Sky News	192	21%	31%	6%	8%	22%	9%	3%	9
26–28 Jul 2025	More in Common		116	19%	31%	6%	12%	19%	10%	2%	12
23–25 Jul 2025	Opinium	The Observer	127	24%	33%	11%	4%	21%	4%	2%	9
23 Jul 2025	Find Out Now		121	13%	28%	10%	11%	29%	5%	5%	1
20–21 Jul 2025	YouGov	The Times/Sky News	198	17%	34%	11%	9%	21%	6%	2%	13
16 Jul 2025	Find Out Now		119	18%	26%	13%	12%	19%	5%	6%	7
13–14 Jul 2025	YouGov	The Times/Sky News	192	18%	33%	7%	12%	22%	6%	3%	11
11–14 Jul 2025	More in Common		177	20%	31%	10%	15%	20%	3%	1%	11
9–11 Jul 2025	Opinium	The Observer	120	20%	31%	11%	6%	23%	7%	3%	8
9 Jul 2025	Find Out Now		129	17%	24%	12%	11%	25%	8%	2%	1
5–7 Jul 2025	YouGov	The Times/Sky News	219	20%	40%	5%	12%	17%	4%	2%	20
4–7 Jul 2025	More in Common		121	25%	28%	11%	9%	20%	4%	3%	3
4–6 Jul 2025	Freshwater Strategies	City AM	54	23%	30%	14%	10%	19%	3%	1%	7
2 Jul 2025	Find Out Now		128	19%	29%	7%	12%	21%	7%	4%	8
29–30 Jun 2025	YouGov	The Times/Sky News	208	22%	32%	12%	8%	13%	9%	2%	10
27–30 Jun 2025	More in Common		165	17%	30%	12%	8%	20%	7%	6%	10
25–27 Jun 2025	Opinium	The Observer	128	20%	28%	15%	7%	21%	6%	2%	7
25 Jun 2025	Find Out Now		109	14%	37%	9%	11%	16%	8%	5%	21
24–25 Jun 2025	BMG Research	iPaper	73	21%	28%	11%	10%	21%	98	1%	7
22–23 Jun 2025	YouGov	The Times/Sky News	156	17%	39%	6%	10%	19%	6%	2%	20
20–23 Jun 2025	More in Common		107	23%	28%	8%	12%	14%	10%	5%	5
18 Jun 2025	Find Out Now		131	24%	34%	7%	4%	20%	10%	1%	10
15–16 Jun 2025	YouGov	The Times/Sky News	196	23%	41%	7%	10%	13%	5%	0%	18
13–16 Jun 2025	More in Common		83	18%	37%	16%	10%	12%	6%	0%	19
11–13 Jun 2025	Opinium	The Observer	117	20%	31%	9%	6%	25%	4%	4%	6
11 Jun 2025	Find Out Now		128	22%	32%	7%	11%	22%	4%	2%	10
10–11 Jun 2025	Survation		142	21%	30%	11%	13%	20%	2%	2%	9
8–9 Jun 2025	YouGov	The Times/Sky News	191	17%	33%	7%	11%	28%	4%		5
6–9 Jun 2025	More in Common		107	19%	33%	5%	13%	23%	6%	0%	10
4 Jun 2025	Find Out Now		96	14%	31%	13%	6%	25%	8%	2%	6
1–2 Jun 2025	YouGov	The Times/Sky News	144	17%	38%	7%	7%	24%	3%	1%	14
30 May – 2 Jun 2025	More in Common		107	24%	25%	12%	12%	18%	9%		1
30 May – 2 Jun 2025	Survation		76	23%	32%	9%	7%	20%	2%	9%	9
28–29 May 2025	BMG Research	iPaper	80	20%	32%	12%	8%	18%	9%	1%	12
28–30 May 2025	Opinium	The Observer	116	19%	33%	9%	13%	20%	4%	2%	13
28 May 2025	Find Out Now		114	13%	26%	12%	9%	32%	4%	1%	6
26–27 May 2025	YouGov	The Times/Sky News	133	17%	23%	13%	12%	24%	7%	4%	1
23–26 May 2025	More in Common		123	16%	24%	16%	10%	24%	4%	4%	Tie
21 May 2025	Find Out Now		108	13%	28%	6%	19%	20%	10%	4%	8
19 May 2025	YouGov	The Times/Sky News	146	19%	28%	8%	19%	18%	11%	0%	9
16–19 May 2025	More in Common		93	16%	26%	12%	14%	23%	8%	2%	3
14–16 May 2025	Opinium	The Observer	113	21%	31%	12%	8%	16%	9%	3%	10
14 May 2025	Find out Now		118	16%	30%	11%	11%	22%	8%	2%	8
11–12 May 2025	YouGov	The Times/Sky News	201	15%	36%	8%	14%	18%	6%	2%	18
10–12 May 2025	More in Common		89	18%	32%	16%	10%	17%	7%	1%	14
7 May 2025	Find out Now		97	9%	34%	10%	18%	21%	9%	0%	13
6 May 2025	YouGov	The Times/Sky News	151	15%	35%	8%	9%	26%	6%	2%	9
3–4 May 2025	More In Common		113	17%	29%	11%	9%	20%	8%	7%	9
30 Apr – 2 May 2025	Opinium	The Observer	122	17%	35%	15%	9%	18%	5%	2%	17
30 Apr – 2 May 2025	Survation		93	33%	35%	9%	14%	5%	2%	3%	2
30 Apr 2025	FindoutNow		93	15%	31%	17%	11%	17%	9%	0%	14
28 Apr 2025	YouGov	The Times/Sky News	147	20%	35%	8%	12%	17%	8%	1%	15
23–25 Apr 2025	Opinium	The Observer	138	21%	32%	14%	9%	17%	6%	1%	11
23 Apr 2025	FindoutNow		99	16%	33%	10%	14%	17%	5%	5%	16
21–22 Apr 2025	YouGov	The Times/Sky News	175	14%	32%	9%	11%	23%	8%	4%	9
17–21 Apr 2025	More in Common		111	19%	27%	17%	10%	18%	5%	4%	8
16 Apr 2025	FindoutNow		118	22%	33%	13%	7%	13%	7%	5%	11
13–14 Apr 2025	YouGov	The Times/Sky News	209	16%	40%	11%	10%	18%	5%	1%	22
11–14 Apr 2025	Focaldata		80	26%	29%	25%	6%	7%	4%	3%	3
9 Apr 2025	FindoutNow		136	18%	25%	14%	16%	13%	6%	5%	7
6–7 Apr 2025	YouGov	The Times/Sky News	209	16%	31%	17%	14%	14%	7%	1%	14
2–4 Apr 2025	FindoutNow		120	19%	38%	12%	6%	11%	7%	6%	19
30–31 Mar 2025	YouGov	The Times/Sky News	208	17%	29%	12%	14%	20%	5%	3%	9
28–31 Mar 2025	More in Common		116	19%	24%	22%	11%	17%	6%	0%	2
26–28 Mar 2025	Opinium	The Observer	120	14%	38%	12%	7%	21%	2%	4%	17
26–27 Mar 2025	BMG	iPaper	101	23%	36%	15%	9%	11%	3%	2%	13
26 Mar 2025	FindoutNow		126	12%	34%	12%	9%	16%	12%	5%	18
22–24 Mar 2025	More in Common		107	21%	29%	19%	9%	20%	3%	0%	8
23–24 Mar 2025	YouGov	The Times/Sky News	203	15%	32%	11%	11%	13%	9%	6%	17
19–21 Mar 2025	Opinium	The Observer	130	20%	30%	11%	13%	21%	2%	3%	9
16–17 Mar 2025	YouGov	The Times/Sky News	201	23%	30%	13%	11%	15%	7%	1%	7
14–17 Mar 2025	DeltaPoll		171	21%	38%	19%	6%	9%	5%	1%	17
12 Mar 2025	FindoutNow		140	16%	33%	13%	6%	23%	4%	3%	10
9–10 Mar 2025	YouGov	The Times/Sky News	199	16%	31%	17%	12%	15%	7%	2%	14
7–10 Mar 2025	More in Common		119	28%	26%	18%	7%	16%	%	1%	2
5–7 Mar 2025	Opinium	The Observer	125	21%	32%	9%	7%	22%	7%	3%	10
5 Mar 2025	FindoutNow		130	22%	31%	16%	10%	15%	6%	1%	9
2–3 Mar 2025	YouGov	The Times	193	21%	32%	13%	11%	16%	6%		11
28 Feb – 2 Mar 2025	More in Common		193	24%	27%	12%	15%	17%	5%		3
26 Feb 2025	FindoutNow		138	15%	31%	12%	11%	24%	7%	1%	7
23–24 Feb 2025	YouGov	The Times	210	17%	39%	15%	10%	14%	4%	1%	22
21–24 Feb 2025	More in Common		108	17%	29%	18%	11%	19%	7%		10
19–21 Feb 2025	Opinium	The Observer	119	17%	36%	11%	12%	16%	6%	2%	19
19 Feb 2025	FindoutNow		102	26%	30%	8%	14%	10%	8%	5%	4
16–17 Feb 2025	YouGov		212	22%	34%	8%	7%	22%	6%		12
14–18 Feb 2025	More in Common		199	22%	31%	13%	12%	18%	3%		9
11–14 Feb 2025	YouGov	The Times	193	21%	32%	13%	11%	16%	6%		11
9–10 Feb 2025	YouGov		107	23%	27%	14%	10%	22%	3%	1%	3
7–10 Feb 2025	More in Common		107	17%	38%	10%	12%	19%	3%	1%	19
5–7 Feb 2025	Opinium	The Observer	124	15%	36%	12%	6%	23%	5%	3%	13
5–6 Feb 2025	Find Out Now		117	18%	30%	10%	14%	18%	9%	3%	12
2–3 Feb 2025	YouGov	Sky News	215	15%	34%	13%	13%	17%	5%	4%	17
28–29 Jan 2025	BMG		104	27%	35%	10%	8%	12%	5%	3%	8
25 Jan 2025	YouGov		147	21%	34%	11%	13%	17%	4%		13
22–23 Jan 2025	Whitestone Insight		136	22%	32%	11%	12%	11%	9%	2%	10
20 Jan 2025	YouGov		159	16%	36%	14%	13%	16%	5%		20
17–20 Jan 2025	More in Common		124	24%	26%	13%	12%	16%	4%		2
13 Jan 2025	YouGov		147	23%	33%	14%	8%	18%	7%		10
6–8 Jan 2025	More in Common		124	20%	30%	18%	10%	17%	3%		8
8 Jan 2025	Find Out Now		102	18%	35%	10%	12%	15%	7%	1%	17
8–10 Jan 2025	Opinium		125	25%	28%	11%	10%	16%	5%	4%	3
30 Dec – 3 Jan 2025	Deltapoll	Mail on Sunday	104	17%	32%	12%	14%	17%	8%		15
4 Jul 2024	2024 General Election Result		–	35.3%	30.0%	12.7%	9.7%	7.0%	3.8%	2.1%	5.3

== MRP polls showing results for Scotland ==
This table shows the number of MPs predicted to be returned from in Scotland using MRP polling,

Date(s) conducted	Pollster	Client	Lab	SNP	Con	LD	Ref	Grn
25 Sep – 2 Oct 2026	Find out Now	PLMR	9	38	4	6		
21–21 Sep 2026	More in Common		18	27	6	5	1	
23 Aug – 18 Sep 2026	YouGov		7	40	3	5	2	
4–11 Sep 2026	Find Out Now	Electoral Calculus	14	31	6	6		
23 Aug – 4 Sep 2026	Survation	38 Degrees	4	45	3	4	1	
25–30 Jul 2026	Convergent Opinion		12	31	2	6	4	2
23–30 Jun 2026	Find Out Now	Electoral Calculus	6	39	6	6	0	0
27 Mar – 7 Apr 2026	Find Out Now	Electoral Calculus	0	45	5	6	0	1
1–30 Mar 2026	More in Common	The Times	8	26	6	6	11	
27 Nov – 16 Dec 2025	More in Common	The Times	1	40	1	6	9	
1–8 Dec 2025	Find Out Now	Electoral Calculus	2	44	4	6	1	
31 Aug – 24 Sep 2025	YouGov		9	37	1	5	5	
8–15 Sep 2025	More in Common	The Times	4	34	1	5	13	
16 Jul – 3 Aug 2025	Stack Data Strategy		8	37	0	5	7	
13–30 Jun 2025	More in Common	The Times	8	42	2	5	0	
25 May – 18 Jun 2025	YouGov		9	38	2	5	3	
10–17 Jun 2025	Find Out Now	Electoral Calculus	22	26	3	6	0	
14 Mar – 1 Apr 2025	More in Common	The Times	15	35	1	6	0	
21–28 Mar 2025	Find Out Now	Electoral Calculus	18	30	3	6	0	
22–25 Jan 2025	Find Out Now	Electoral Calculus	12	37	3	5	0	
30 Dec – 5 Jan 2025	Focaldata	Hope Not Hate	23	22	7	5	0	
30 Nov – 16 Dec 2024	More in Common	The Times	11	37	4	5	0	
4 Jul 2024	2024 General Election Result		37	9	5	6	0	

== See also ==
- List of political parties in Scotland
- Next United Kingdom general election in Scotland
- Opinion polling on Scottish independence
- Opinion polling for the next Scottish Parliament election
- Opinion polling for the next United Kingdom general election
