= Next Scottish Parliament election =

- On or before 1 May 2031

All 129 seats to the Scottish Parliament 65 seats needed for a majority
- Opinion polls
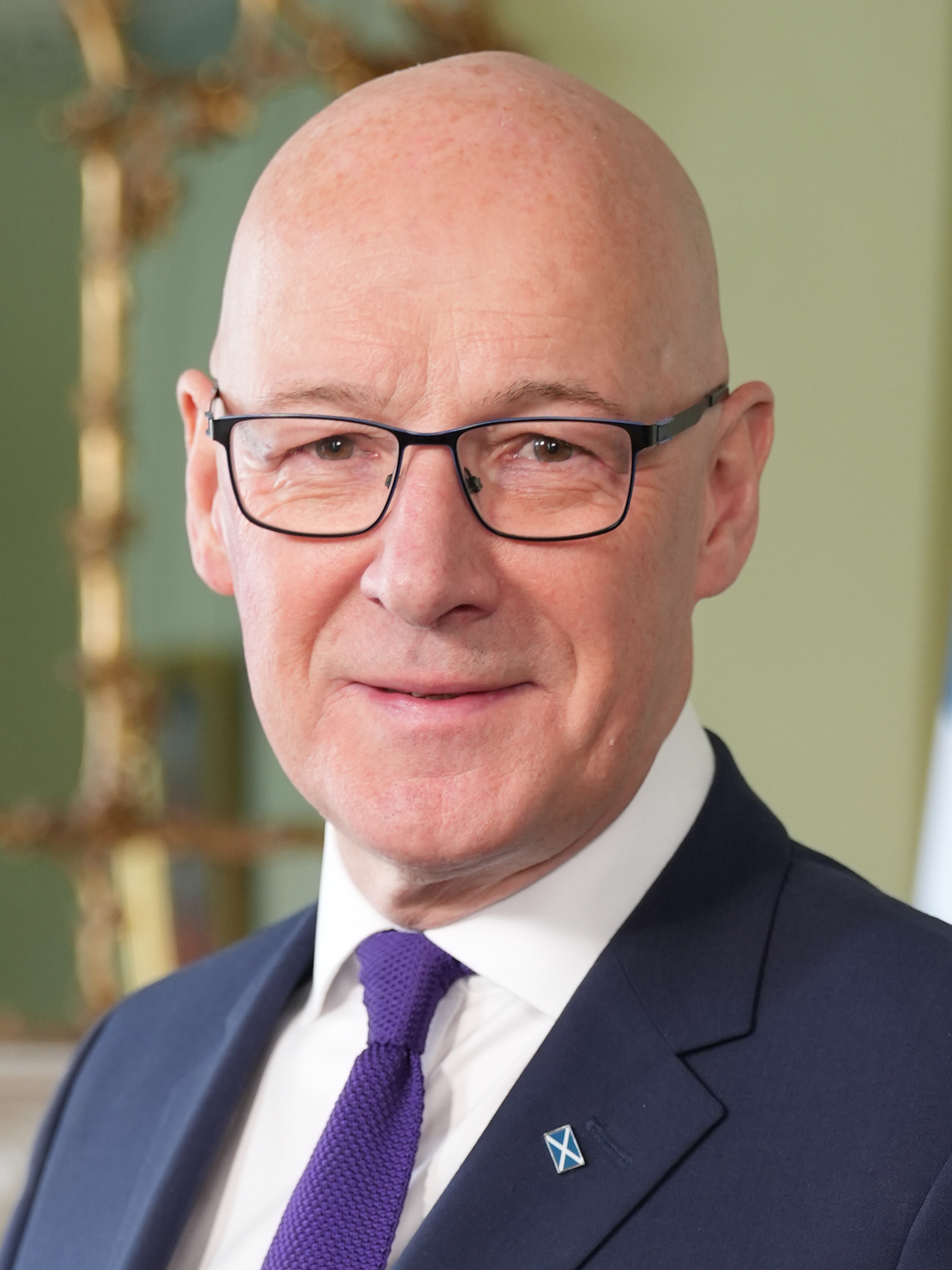

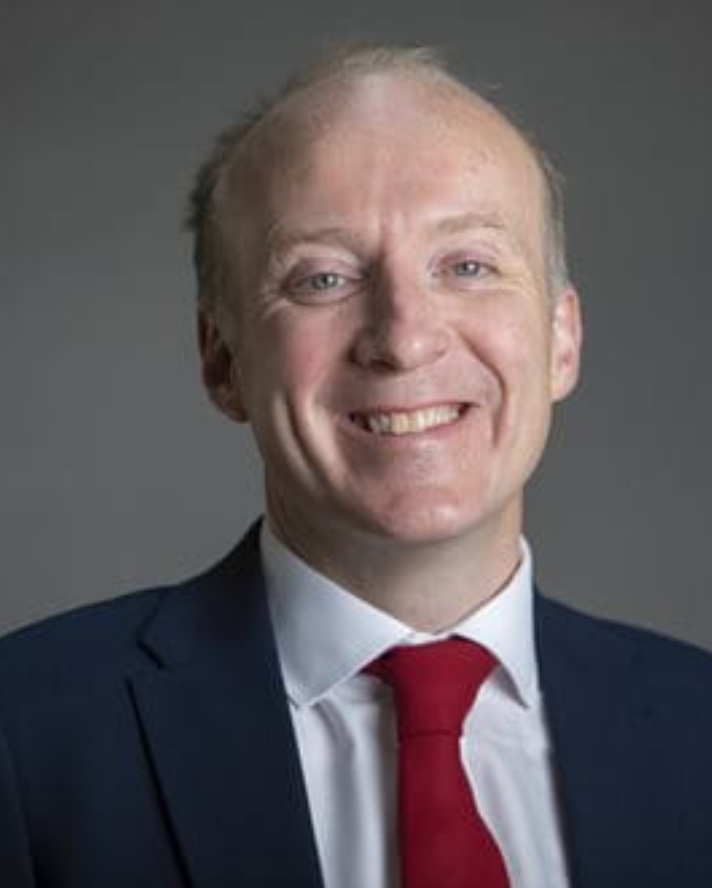

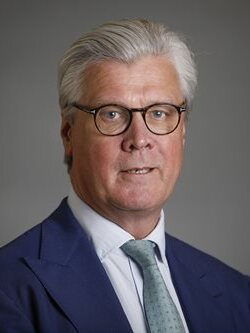

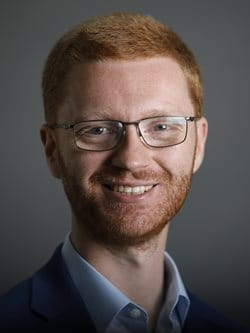

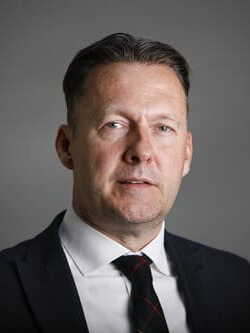

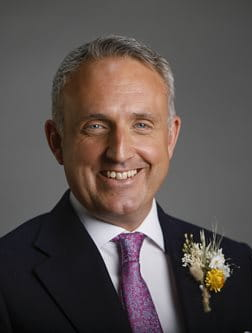
Leader	John Swinney	Michael Marra	Malcolm Offord
Party	SNP	Labour	Reform
Leader since	6 May 2024	19 September 2026	15 January 2026
Leader's seat	Perthshire North	North East Scotland	West Scotland
Last election	58 seats	17 seats	17 seats
Current seats	57	17	16
Seats needed	▲8	▲48	▲49
Leader	Ross Greer / Gillian Mackay	Russell Findlay	Alex Cole-Hamilton
Party	Green	Conservative	Liberal Democrats
Leader since	29 August 2025	27 September 2024	20 August 2021
Leader's seat	West Scotland / Central Scotland and Lothians West	West Scotland	Edinburgh North Western
Last election	15 seats	12 seats	10 seats
Current seats	15	12	10
Seats needed	▲50	▲53	▲55
Incumbent First Minister
John Swinney
SNP

The next Scottish Parliament election is due to be held on the 1 May 2031, although under certain circumstances an extraordinary general election may be held earlier than this. The election will elect the 129 members of the Scottish Parliament, and will be the eighth general election since the devolved parliament was established in 1999.

== Date ==
Under the Scottish Elections (Reform) Act 2020, ordinary general elections to the Scottish Parliament take place every five years, being held on the first Thursday in May. As the most recent election was the 2026 election in May, the next election is therefore scheduled to be held on 1 May 2031. This date can be brought forwards by up to 4 weeks or delayed by up to 8 weeks on the proposal of the Presiding Officer. As of 2026, this power to alter the date of an ordinary election has not been used.

An earlier election, termed an extraordinary general election, is possible if Parliament is dissolved. The Parliament may itself resolve that this should happen: this would require at least two-thirds of the members (i.e. 86 members) to vote in favour, following which the Presiding Officer would propose a date for an extraordinary general election and the Parliament would be dissolved by the monarch by royal proclamation. It does not necessarily require a two-thirds majority to precipitate an extraordinary general election, because under the Scotland Act Parliament is also dissolved if it fails to nominate one of its members to be First Minister within certain time limits, irrespective of whether this occurs at the beginning or in the middle of a parliamentary term. Therefore, if the First Minister resigned, Parliament would have 28 days to elect a successor. If no new First Minister were elected then the Presiding Officer would ask for Parliament to be dissolved. This process could also be triggered if the First Minister lost a vote of confidence by a simple majority (i.e. more than 50%), as they must then resign. An extraordinary general election would be in addition to ordinary general election, unless held less than six months before its due date, in which case it would supplant it. The following ordinary election reverts to the next scheduled date (i.e. the first Thursday in May in the next year ending in 1 or 6). As of 2026, no extraordinary election have been held to date.

== Background ==
=== Electoral events ===
==== 2026 Scottish Parliament election ====
The 2026 Scottish Parliament election was held on 7 May 2026. The governing Scottish National Party (SNP) secured a fifth consecutive term as they emerged as the largest party with 58 MSPs, despite losing six seats and falling seven short of a majority. Reform and Labour both won 17 seats, followed by the Greens on 15, the Conservatives on 12, and the Liberal Democrats on 10. It was the worst performance at a Scottish Parliament election for both Labour and Conservatives, with the former's seat share decreasing for the sixth consecutive election. Conversely, the Greens had their best-ever result, going into double figures for the first time and winning their first constituency seats. Reform enjoyed a rise in support, although they were the only party represented in Parliament not to win constituency seats.

Following the election Kenneth Gibson of the SNP was elected as the new Presiding Officer. As Presiding Officer Gibson renounced his party membership for the duration of his term, reducing the SNP to 57 members in the chamber.

==== 2026 Labour leadership election ====
Although Scottish Labour suffered its worst ever result in a Scottish Parliament election, leader Anas Sarwar initially said he intended to continue serving as leader. He subsequently resigned two months later to take up a role as trade minister in the Burnham government, receiving a life peerage to do so. This triggered the 2026 Scottish Labour leadership election that was won by Michael Marra.

== Opinion polling ==
Graph of opinion poll results prior to the next Scottish Parliament election. Trendlines are 30-day moving averages.

Key

SNP – Scottish National Party
Labour – Scottish Labour
Reform – Reform UK
Green – Scottish Greens
Conservative – Scottish Conservatives
Lib Dem – Scottish Liberal Democrats

== Target seats ==
Below are listed all the constituencies which required a swing of less than 5% from the 2026 result to change hands. Shetland is also included due to its small electorate size.

=== SNP targets ===
Rank	Constituency	Winning party in 2026	Swing to gain %	SNP's place in 2026
1	Na h-Eileanan an Iar	Labour	0.60	2nd
2	Skye, Lochaber and Badenoch	Liberal Democrats	1.25	2nd
3	Dumfriesshire	Conservative	1.70	2nd
4	Dumbarton	Labour	2.80	2nd
5	Galloway and West Dumfries	Conservative	2.65	2nd
6	Strathkelvin and Bearsden	Liberal Democrats	3.25	2nd
7	Edinburgh Northern	Liberal Democrats	3.35	2nd
8	Glasgow Southside	Green	4.05	2nd

=== Labour targets ===
Rank	Constituency	Winning party in 2026	Swing to gain %	Labour's place in 2026
1	East Lothian Coast and Lammermuirs	SNP	0.55	2nd
2	Midlothian North	SNP	4.30	2nd
3	Hamilton, Larkhall and Stonehouse	SNP	4.30	2nd
4	Renfrewshire West and Levern Valley	SNP	4.70	2nd
5	Paisley	SNP	4.90	2nd

=== Reform UK targets ===
Rank	Constituency	Winning party in 2026	Swing to gain %	Reform's place in 2026
1	Banffshire and Buchan Coast	SNP	0.65	2nd
2	Carrick, Cumnock and Doon Valley	SNP	4.55	2nd

=== Green targets ===
Rank	Constituency	Winning party in 2026	Swing to gain %	Greens's place in 2026
1	Glasgow Kelvin and Maryhill	SNP	3.29	2nd
2	Edinburgh North Eastern and Leith	SNP	4.00	2nd

=== Conservative targets ===
Rank	Constituency	Winning party in 2026	Swing to gain %	Conservatives' place in 2026
1	Eastwood	SNP	0.95	2nd
2	Aberdeenshire East	SNP	1.35	2nd
3	Aberdeen Deeside and North Kincardine	SNP	1.80	2nd
4	Moray	SNP	4.05	2nd

=== Liberal Democrat targets ===
Rank	Constituency	Winning party in 2026	Swing to gain %	Liberal Democrats' place in 2026
1	Inverness and Nairn	SNP	0.60	2nd
2	Argyll and Bute	SNP	4.65	2nd
3	Shetland	SNP	6.60	2nd
